= History of Belgium =

For most of its history, what is today Belgium was either a part of a larger territory, such as the medieval Carolingian Empire, or was divided into a number of smaller states. For much of the Middle Ages, the territory of present-day Belgium was fragmented into several feudal principalities, including the Duchy of Brabant, the County of Flanders, the Prince-Bishopric of Liège, the County of Namur, the County of Hainaut and the County of Luxembourg. Belgium's modern shape can be traced back at least as far as the Spanish Netherlands during the Eighty Years' War (1568–1648), which is when the Dutch Republic in the north split from the Southern Netherlands from which Belgium and Luxembourg developed. The area briefly came under Bourbon control during the War of the Spanish Succession. The resulting Peace of Utrecht transferred the area back to Habsburg control, creating the Austrian Netherlands. The French Revolutionary wars led to Belgium becoming part of France in 1795. After the defeat of the French in 1814, the Congress of Vienna created two new states, the United Kingdom of the Netherlands and the Grand Duchy of Luxembourg, which were placed in dynastic union under the House of Orange-Nassau. The Southern Netherlands rebelled during the 1830 Belgian Revolution, establishing the modern Belgian state, officially recognized at the London Conference of 1830. The first King of Belgium, Leopold I, assumed the throne in 1831.

The first half of the twentieth century was tumultuous. Its historic neutrality was violated in each of the World Wars. During World War I, frustrated German invaders launched the Rape of Belgium. During the 1940 invasion, the quick surrender by Leopold III of Belgium to German forces drove a wedge between the King and his people. The King's attempt to return led to a constitutional crisis in 1950, which led to his abdication in favor of his son Baudouin. Belgium entered the second half of the twentieth century showing an unprecedented era of economic growth, as Belgium took an active role in the formation of the Benelux customs union with its neighbors. Ultimately, the Benelux union would serve as a model for the European Economic Community, a precursor to the European Union; to this day Brussels serves as the seat of many of the European Union institutions.

Domestically, the country has faced divisions over differences of language and unequal economic development. This ongoing antagonism has caused far-reaching reforms since the 1970s. It is now divided into three regions: Dutch-speaking Flanders in the north, French-speaking Wallonia in the south, and bilingual Brussels in the middle. Since the 1990s, Belgium has become involved in several international conflicts, under the aegis of various United Nations peacekeeping forces, including the Rwandan Civil War, the ongoing civil wars in Somalia, the Kosovo War, and several others. Environmental concerns came to a head in the Dioxin affair, bringing down the Belgian government of Jean-Luc Dehaene's premiership. Since then, the Belgian political landscape has become increasingly politically fragmented; after the 2010 Belgian federal election, it took nearly a year to form a government, and in more recent elections a growing right-wing Flemish nationalist movement has had a strong influence over domestic politics.

== Names ==
Belgium and Flanders were the first two common names used for the Burgundian Netherlands which was the predecessor of the Austrian Netherlands, the predecessor of Belgium. The County of Flanders was the original foothold of the Burgundian dukes in the region, to which other territories were later attached.

"Belgium" is originally a Latin term used by Julius Caesar, referring to an area now mostly in Northern France, where the tribes ruling the military alliance of the Belgae lived. Under Roman rule, this region was the equivalent of the province of Belgica Secunda, which stretched into the coastal Flemish part of modern Belgium.

In late Roman and medieval times, the term Belgium tended to be used to refer to Roman Belgica Prima, and its successor Upper Lotharingia, in the Moselle region of Germany, Luxembourg and France. Only slowly did the old term start to be used for the area which is now the Netherlands and Belgium. A key turning point, when it was used specifically to refer to the southern part of the Netherlands, was during the Brabant Revolution in 1790. This terminology was revived after the better known revolution of 1830, when modern Belgium broke out of the post-Waterloo United Kingdom of the Netherlands.

== Prehistory ==
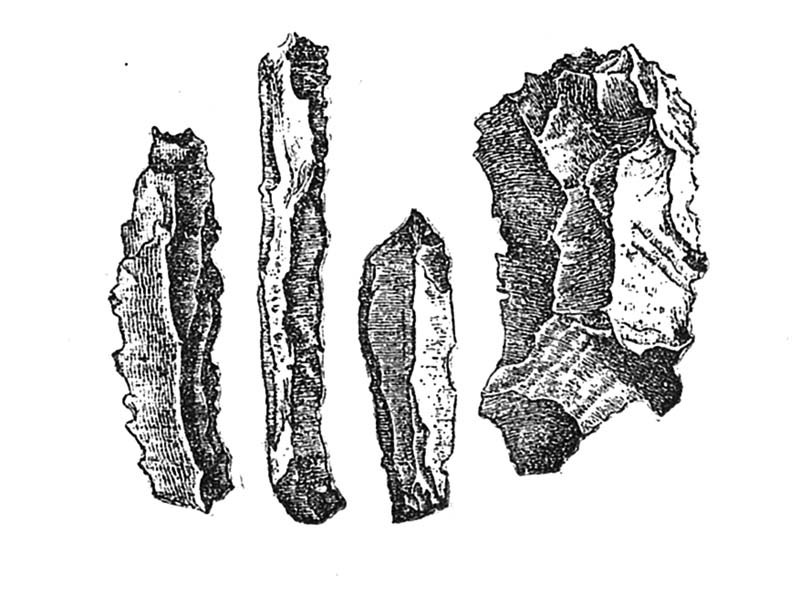
Flint knives discovered in Belgian caves

On Belgian territory Neanderthal fossils were discovered at Engis in 1829–30 and elsewhere, some dating back to at least 100,000 BC.

The earliest Neolithic farming technology of northern Europe, the so-called LBK culture, reached the east of Belgium at its furthest northwesterly stretch from its origins in southeast Europe. Its expansion stopped in the Hesbaye region of eastern Belgium around 5000 BC. The Belgian LBK is notable for its use of defensive walls around villages.

"Limburg pottery" and "La Hoguette pottery" are styles which stretch into northwestern France and the Netherlands, but it has sometimes been argued that these technologies are the result of pottery technology spreading beyond the original LBK farming population and being made by hunter gatherers. A slightly later-starting Neolithic culture found in central Wallonia is the so-called "Groupe de Blicquy", which may represent an offshoot of the LBK settlers. One notable archaeological site in this region is the Neolithic flint mines of Spiennes.

Farming in Belgium failed to take permanent hold at first. The LBK and Blicquy cultures disappeared and there is a long gap before a new farming culture, the Michelsberg culture, appeared and became widespread. Hunter gatherers of the Swifterbant culture apparently remained in the sandy north of Belgium, but apparently became more and more influenced by farming and pottery technology.

In the third and late fourth millennia BC, the whole of Flanders shows relatively little evidence of human habitation. The Seine-Oise-Marne culture spread into the Ardennes, and is associated with megalithic sites there (for example Wéris), but did not disperse over all of Belgium. To the north and east, in the Netherlands, a semi-sedentary culture group has been proposed to have existed, the so-called Vlaardingen-Wartburg-Stein complex, which possibly developed from the above-mentioned Swifterbant and Michelsburg cultures. The same pattern continues into the late Neolithic and early Bronze Age. In the last part of the Neolithic, evidence is found for the Corded Ware and Bell Beaker cultures in the south of the Netherlands.

The population of Belgium started to increase permanently with the late Bronze Age from around 1750 BC. Three possibly related European cultures arrived in sequence. First the Urnfield culture arrived, then, coming into the Iron Age, the Hallstatt culture, and the La Tène culture. All three of these are associated with Indo-European languages. From 500 BC Celtic tribes settled in the region and traded with the Mediterranean world. From c. 150 BC, the first coins came into use.

== Celtic and Roman periods ==
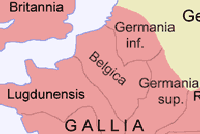
The Roman province of Gallia Belgica in around 120 AD

When Julius Caesar arrived in the region, as recorded in his De Bello Gallico, the inhabitants of Belgium, northwestern France, and the German Rhineland were known as the Belgae, and they were considered to be the northern part of Gaul. The region of Luxembourg, including the part of the Belgian province of Luxembourg around Arlon, was inhabited by the Treveri.

The exact nature of the distinction between the Belgae to the North and the Celts to the south, and the Germani across the Rhine, is disputed. Caesar said that the Belgae were separated from the rest of Gaul by language, law and custom, and he also said they had Germanic ancestry. On the other hand, linguists have proposed that there is evidence that the northern part of the Belgic population had previously spoken an Indo-European language related to, but distinct from, Celtic and Germanic (see Belgian language and Nordwestblock).

The leaders of the Belgic alliance which Caesar confronted were in modern France, the Suessiones, Viromandui and Ambiani and perhaps some of their neighbours, in an area that he appears to distinguish as the true "Belgium" of classical times. Concerning the territory of modern Belgium, he reported that the more northerly allies of the Belgae, from west to east the Menapii, Nervii, and Germani cisrhenani, were less economically developed and more warlike, similar to the Germani east of the Rhine river. The Menapii and northern Germani lived among low thorny forests, islands and swamps, and the central Belgian Nervii lands were deliberately planted with thick hedges to be impenetrable to cavalry. There is also less archaeological evidence of large settlements and trade in the area.

Modern linguists use the word "germanic" to refer to languages but it is not known for sure whether even the Belgian Germani spoke a Germanic language, and their tribal and personal names are clearly Celtic. Archaeologists have also had difficulty finding evidence of the exact migrations from east of the Rhine which Caesar reports and more generally there has been skepticism about using him in this way due to the political motives of his commentaries. But the archaeological record gives the impression that the classical Belgian Germani were a relatively stable population going back to Urnfield times, with a more recently immigrated elite class.

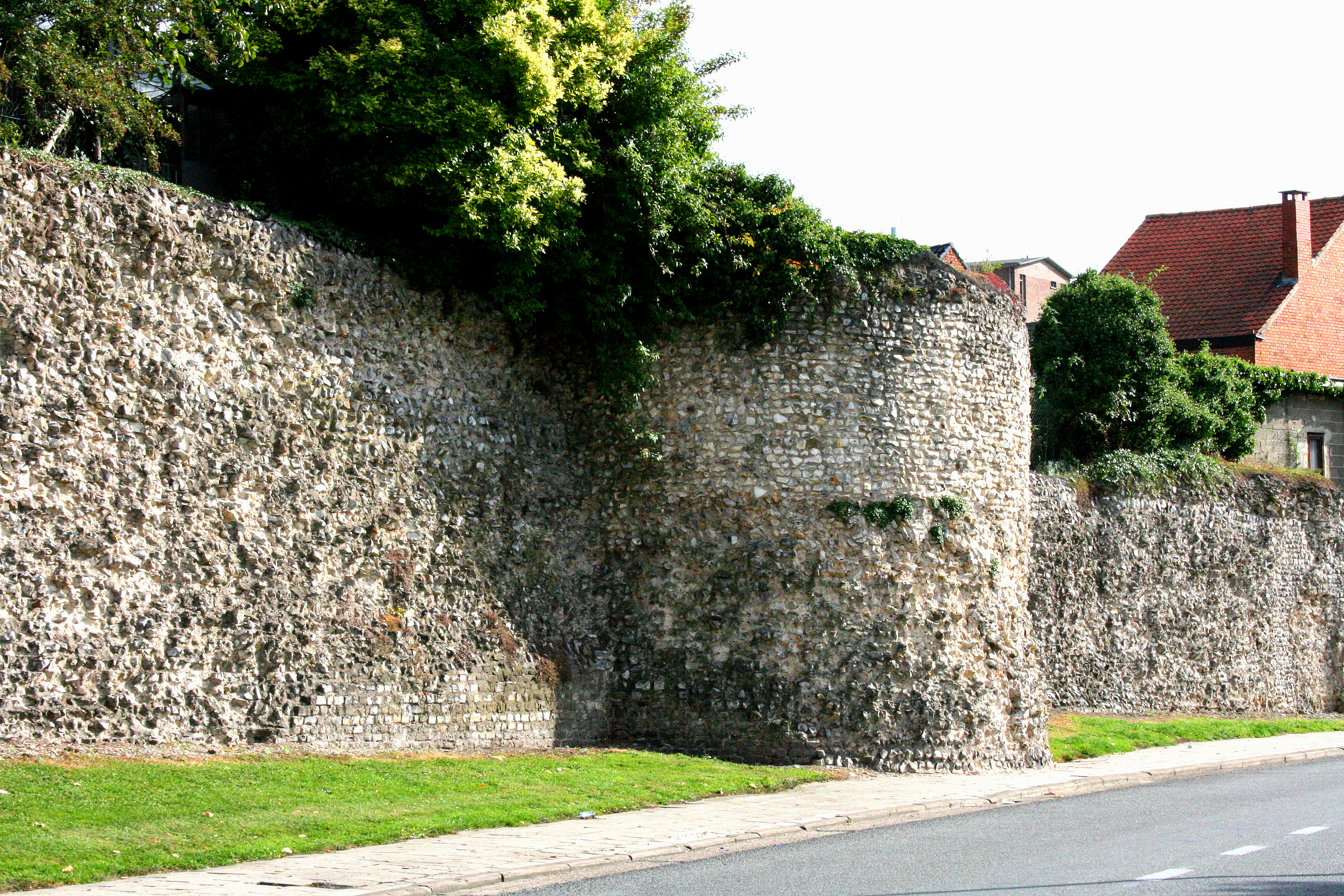
Surviving Roman city walls in Tongeren, the former city of Atuatuca Tongrorum

The Menapii and Nervii flourished within the Roman province of Gallia Belgica, along with the southern Belgae and the Treveri. These Roman provinces were broken into civitates, each with a capital city, and each representing one of the major tribal groups named by Caesar. At first, only one, Tongeren capital of the Tungri, was in modern Belgium. Later, the capital of the Menapii was moved from Cassel in modern France to Tournai in Belgium. The Nervian capital was in the south of the territory in modern France, at Bavay, and later moved to Cambrai. Trier, the capital of the Treveri, is today in Germany.

The northeastern corner of this province, including Tongeren and the area of the earlier Germani, was united with the militarized Rhine border to form a newer province known as Germania Inferior, with capital Colonia Agrippina (Cologne in Germany). Emperor Diocletian restructured the provinces around 300, and split the remaining Belgica into two provinces: Belgica Prima and Belgica Secunda. Belgica Prima was the eastern part and had Trier as its main city, and included part of the Belgian province of Luxembourg. It became one of the most important Roman cities in Western Europe in the 3rd century.

Christianity was introduced to Belgium during the late-Roman period, and the first known bishop in the region Servatius taught in the middle of the Fourth century in Tongeren.

== Early Middle Ages ==
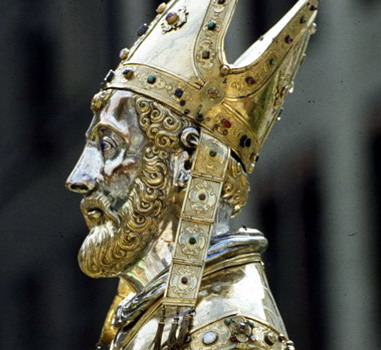
Saint Servatius, bishop of Tongeren and one of the first known Christian figures in the region. 16th century reliquary.

In the Middle Ages, the old Roman civitates became the basis of Christian dioceses, and the row of dioceses which form the core of modern Belgium (Tournai, Cambrai, and Liège) were the most northerly continental areas to retain a Romanized culture. The modern Belgian language boundary derives from this period, as the area was a contact point of Frankish and Romanized populations.

As the Western Roman Empire lost power, Germanic tribes came to dominate the military, and then form kingdoms. Coastal Flanders, the old territory of the Menapii, became part of the "Saxon Shore". In inland northern Belgium, Franks from the Roman frontier in the Rhine delta were allowed to re-settle in Toxandria in the 4th century. Wallonia remained more heavily Romanized, although it eventually became subject to Franks in the 5th century. Franks remained important in the Roman military, and the Romanized Frankish Merovingian Dynasty eventually took over northern France. Clovis I, the best-known king of this dynasty, first conquered Romanized northern France, later called Neustria, then turned north to the Frankish lands later referred to as Austrasia, which included all or most of Belgium. Christian missionaries preached to the populace and started a wave of conversion.

Southern part of the Low Countries with bishopry towns and abbeys c. 7th century. Abbeys were the onset to larger villages and even some towns to reshape the landscape.

The Merovingian dynasty was succeeded by the Carolingian dynasty, whose family power base was in and around the eastern part of modern Belgium. After Charles Martel countered the Moorish invasion from Spain (732 — Poitiers), King Charlemagne brought a huge part of Europe under his rule and was crowned the "Emperor of the new Holy Roman Empire" by the Pope Leo III in 800.

The Vikings raided widely throughout this period, but a major settlement that had caused problems in the area of Belgium was defeated in 891 by Arnulf of Carinthia in the battle of Leuven.

The Frankish lands were divided and reunified several times under the Merovingian and Carolingian dynasties, but eventually were firmly divided into France and the Holy Roman Empire. The parts of the County of Flanders west of the river Scheldt became part of France during the Middle Ages, but the remainders of the County of Flanders and the Low Countries were part of the Holy Roman Empire, specifically the stem duchy of Lower Lotharingia, which had a period as an independent kingdom.

Through the early Middle Ages, the northern part of present-day Belgium (Flanders) was a Germanic language-speaking area, whereas in the southern part people had continued to be Romanized and spoke derivatives of Vulgar Latin.

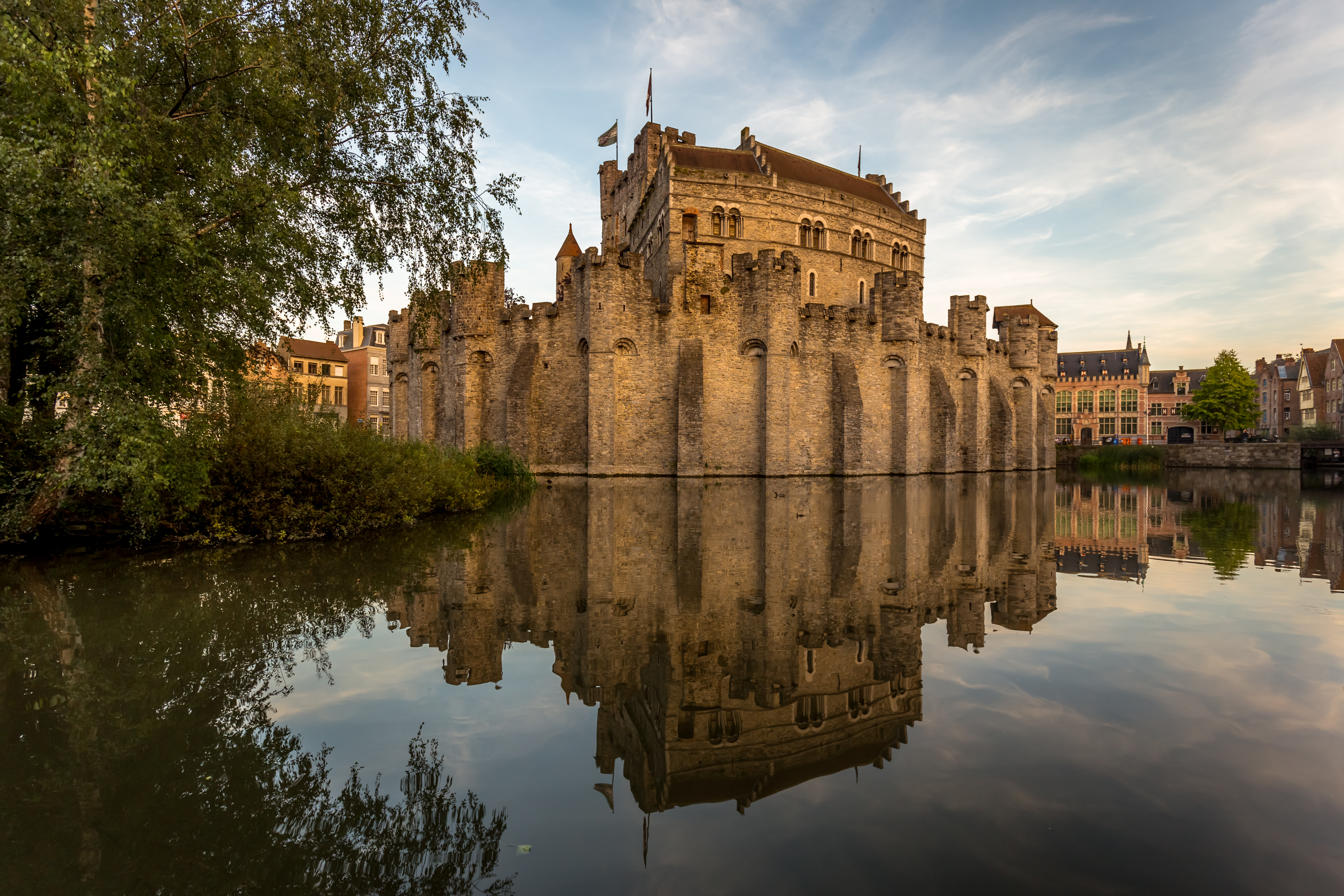
The Gravensteen in Ghent, whose current buildings date to 1180, was the castle of the Counts of Flanders.

As the Holy Roman emperors and French kings lost effective control of their domains in the 11th and 12th centuries, the territory more or less corresponding to the present Belgium was divided into relatively independent feudal states, including:

- The County of Flanders
- The Marquisate of Namur
- The Duchy of Brabant (see also Duke of Brabant)
- The County of Hainaut
- The Duchy of Limburg
- The County of Luxembourg
- The Prince-Bishopric of Liège (the territory over which the bishop ruled as a lord, which was smaller than the diocese)

The coastal county of Flanders was one of the wealthiest parts of Europe in the late Middle Ages, from trading with England, France and Germany, and it became culturally important. During the 11th and 12th centuries, the Rheno-Mosan or Mosan art movement flourished in the region moving its centre from Cologne and Trier to Liège, Maastricht and Aachen.

== Late Middle Ages and Renaissance ==
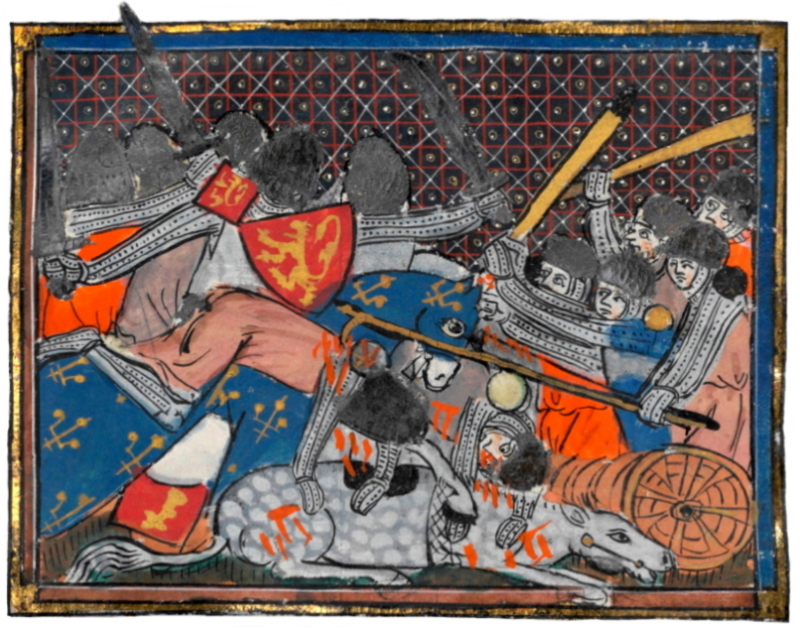
14th-century illustration of the Battle of the Golden Spurs in 1302 where forces from the County of Flanders defeated their nominal overlords of the Kingdom of France.

In this period, many cities, including Ypres, Bruges and Ghent, obtained their city charter. The Hanseatic League stimulated trade in the region, and the period saw the erection of many Gothic cathedrals and city halls. With the decline of the Holy Roman emperors' power starting in the 13th century, the Low Countries were largely left to their own devices. The lack of imperial protection also meant that the French and English began vying for influence.

In 1214, King Philip II of France defeated the Count of Flanders in the Battle of Bouvines and forced his submission to the French crown. Through the remainder of the 13th century, French control over Flanders steadily increased until 1302 when an attempt at total annexation by Philip IV met a stunning defeat when Count Guy humiliated the French knights at the Battle of the Golden Spurs. Philip launched a new campaign that ended with the inconclusive Battle of Mons-en-Pévèle in 1304. The king imposed harsh peace terms on Flanders, which included ceding the important textile-making centers of Lille and Douai.

Thereafter, Flanders remained a French tributary until the start of the Hundred Years' War in 1337. Paris's influence in the Low Countries was counterbalanced by England, which maintained important ties to the coastal ports and came to dominate the wool-shipping business. Flemish cloth remained a highly valued product, highly dependent on English wool. Any interruption in the supply of that invariably resulted in riots and violence from the weavers' guilds. Flanders received imports from other areas of Europe, but itself purchased little abroad except wine from Spain and France. Bruges became a great commercial center after the Hanseatic League set up business there. From early on, the Low Countries began to develop as a commercial and manufacturing center. Merchants became the dominant class in the towns, with the nobility largely limited to countryside estates.

History of the Low Countries (schematic)
Frisii		Germanic tribes		Belgae & Celts			
Frisii	Cana– nefates (Note: Roman foederati)	Chamavi, Tubantes (Note: The Chamavi merged into the confederation of the Franks; the Tubantes merged into the confederation of the Saxons.)		Gallia Belgica (55 BC–c. 5th century AD); Germania Inferior (83–c. 5th century)			
Frisii	Cana– nefates	Salian Franks		Batavi			
unpopulated (4th –c. 5th centuries)		Saxons	Salian Franks (4th–c. 5th centuries)				
Frisian Kingdom (c. 6th century – 734)		Saxons	Frankish Kingdom (481–843)—Carolingian Empire (800–843)				
Frisian Kingdom (c. 6th century – 734)		Austrasia (511–687)					
Middle Francia (843–855)				West; Francia (from 843)	Middle Francia (843–855)		
Kingdom of Lotharingia (Note: Part of East Francia after 939, divided in Upper Lorraine (as part of West Francia) and Lower Lorraine (as part of East Francia) in 959.) (855–959); Duchy of Lower Lorraine (Note: Lower Lorraine—also referred to as Lothier—disintegrated into several smaller independent territories and only the title of a "Duke of Lothier" remained, held by Brabant.) (from 959)			Kingdom of Lotharingia (855–959); Duchy of Lower Lorraine (from 959)	West; Francia (from 843)	Kingdom of Lotharingia (855–959); Duchy of Lower Lorraine (from 959)		
Frisia			Kingdom of Lotharingia (855–959); Duchy of Lower Lorraine (from 959)	County of Flanders (Note: Including County of Artois (part of Flanders until 1237) and Tournaisis.) (862–1384)	Kingdom of Lotharingia (855–959); Duchy of Lower Lorraine (from 959)		
Frisian; Freedom (Note: Lordship of Frisia and Lordship of Groningen (including the Ommelanden) after 1524 and 1536 respectively.) (11th–16th centuries)	County of Holland (Note: Including County of Zeeland, that was ruled by neighboring County of Holland and County of Flanders (until 1432).) (880–1432)	Bishopric of Utrecht (Note: Utrecht included Lordship of Overijssel (until 1528), County of Drenthe (until 1528) and County of Zutphen (until 1182).) (695–1456)	Duchy of Brabant (Note: Duchy of Brabant included since 1288 also the Duchy of Limburg (now part of Belgium's Liège Province) and the "Overmaas" lands Dalhem, Valkenburg and Herzogenrath (now part of the Dutch Province of Limburg).) (1183–1430) Duchy of Guelders (Note: The county, later duchy, of Guelders consisted of four quarters, as they were separated by rivers: situated upstream Upper Quarter (the present day northern half of the Dutch province of Limburg), spatially separated from the three downstream Lower Quarters: County of Zutphen (after 1182), Veluwe Quarter and Nijmegen Quarter. The three lower quarters emerged from the historic gau Hamaland (named after the Chamavi tribe), and formed the present day province of Gelderland. Guelders did not include the Cleves enclave Huissen and the independent counties of Buren and Culemborg, that were much later seceded to the province of Gelderland.) (1046–1543)	County of Flanders (862–1384)	County of Hainaut (1071–1432) County of Namur (981–1421)	Prince- Bishopric of Liège (Note: Throughout the Middle Ages, the bishopric was further expanded with the Duchy of Bouillon in 1096 (ceded to France in 1678), the acquisition of the county of Loon in 1366 and the county of Horne in 1568. The Lordship of Mechelen was also part of the Prince-Bishopric of Liège.)(980–1791)	Duchy of Luxembourg (1059–1443)
Frisian; Freedom (11th–16th centuries)	Burgundian Netherlands (1384–1482)					Prince- Bishopric of Liège (980–1791)	Burgundian Netherlands (1384–1482)
Habsburg Netherlands (1482–1795) (Seventeen Provinces after 1543) (Note: The name Seventeen Provinces came in use after the Habsburg emperor Charles V had re-acquired the Duchy of Guelders, and an continuous territory arose.)						Prince- Bishopric of Liège (980–1791)	Habsburg Netherlands (1482–1795) (Seventeen Provinces after 1543)
Dutch Republic (1581–1795)				Spanish Netherlands (1556–1714)		Prince- Bishopric of Liège (980–1791)	Spanish Netherlands (1556–1714)
Dutch Republic (1581–1795)				Austrian Netherlands (1714–1795)		Prince- Bishopric of Liège (980–1791)	Austrian Netherlands (1714–1795)
Dutch Republic (1581–1795)				United States of Belgium (1790)		Republic of Liège (1789–'91)	United States of Belgium (1790)
Dutch Republic (1581–1795)				Austrian Netherlands (1795–1797)		P.-Bish. of Liège (1791–1794)	Austrian Netherlands (1795–1797)
Batavian Republic (1795–1806); Kingdom of Holland (1806–1810)			associated with French First Republic (1795–1804) part of First French Empire (1804–1815)				
part of First French Empire (1810–1813)			associated with French First Republic (1795–1804) part of First French Empire (1804–1815)				
Sovereign Principality of the Netherlands (1813–1815)			associated with French First Republic (1795–1804) part of First French Empire (1804–1815)				
United Kingdom of the Netherlands (1815–1830)							Grand Duchy of Luxembourg (from 1815)
Kingdom of the Netherlands (from 1839)				Kingdom of Belgium (from 1830)			Grand Duchy of Luxembourg (from 1815)
Kingdom of the Netherlands (from 1839)				Kingdom of Belgium (from 1830)			Grand Duchy of Luxembourg (from 1890)

By 1433 most of the Belgian and Luxembourgish territory became part of Burgundy under Philip the Good. When Mary of Burgundy, granddaughter of Philip the Good married Maximilian I, the Low Countries became Habsburg territory. The Holy Roman Empire was unified with Spain under the Habsburg Dynasty after Charles V inherited several domains.

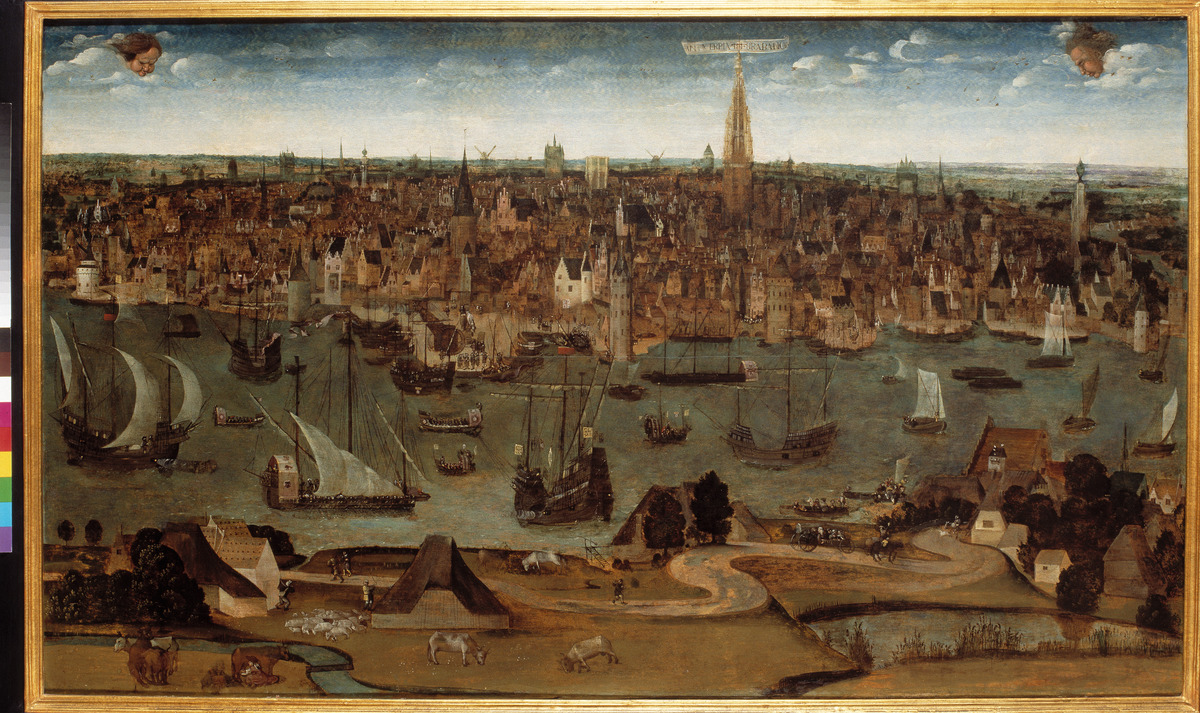
View of Antwerp painted c.1540.

Map illustrating the formation of the Habsburg Netherlands 1482–1543

Especially during the Burgundy period (the 15th and 16th centuries), Tournai, Bruges, Ypres, Ghent, Brussels, and Antwerp took turns at being major European centers for commerce, industry (especially textiles) and art. Bruges had a strategic location at the crossroads of the northern Hanseatic League trade and the southern trade routes. Bruges was already included in the circuit of the Flemish and French cloth fairs at the beginning of the 13th century, but when the old system of fairs broke down the entrepreneurs of Bruges innovated. They developed, or borrowed from Italy, new forms of merchant capitalism. They employed new forms of economic exchange, including bills of exchange (i.e. promissory notes) and letters of credit. Antwerp eagerly welcomed foreign traders, most notably the Portuguese pepper and spice traders.

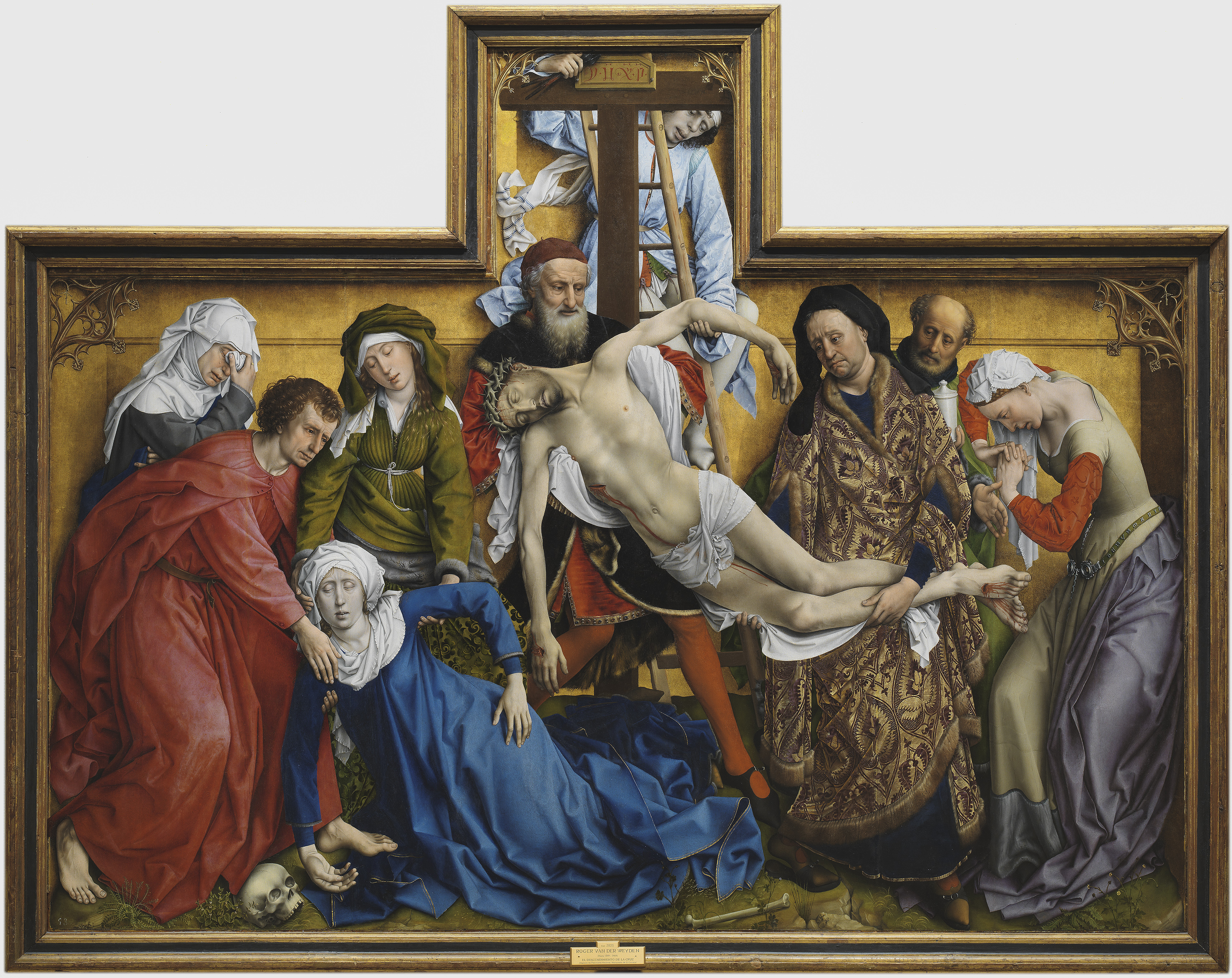
An altarpiece by the Brabantian painter Rogier van der Weyden (1399-1464) who was at the forefront of the Northern Renaissance

In art the Renaissance was represented by the Flemish Primitives, a group of painters active primarily in the Southern Netherlands in the 15th and early 16th centuries, and the Franco-Flemish composers. Flemish tapestries and, in the 16th and 17th centuries, Brussels tapestry hung on the walls of castles throughout Europe. The Burgundian princes enhanced their political prestige with economic growth and artistic splendour. These "Great Dukes of the West" were effectively sovereigns, with domains extending from the Zuiderzee to the Somme. The urban and other textile industries, which had developed in the Belgian territories since the 12th century, became the economic center of northwestern Europe.

The Pragmatic Sanction of 1549, issued by Holy Roman Emperor Charles V, established the so-called Seventeen Provinces, as an entity on its own, apart from the Empire and from France. This comprised all of Belgium, present-day northeastern France, present-day Luxembourg, and present-day Netherlands, except for the lands of the Prince-Bishop of Liège. In Brussels on 25 October 1555, Charles V abdicated Belgica Regia to his son, who in January 1556 assumed the throne of Spain as Philip II.

== Dutch Revolt and 80 Years' War ==
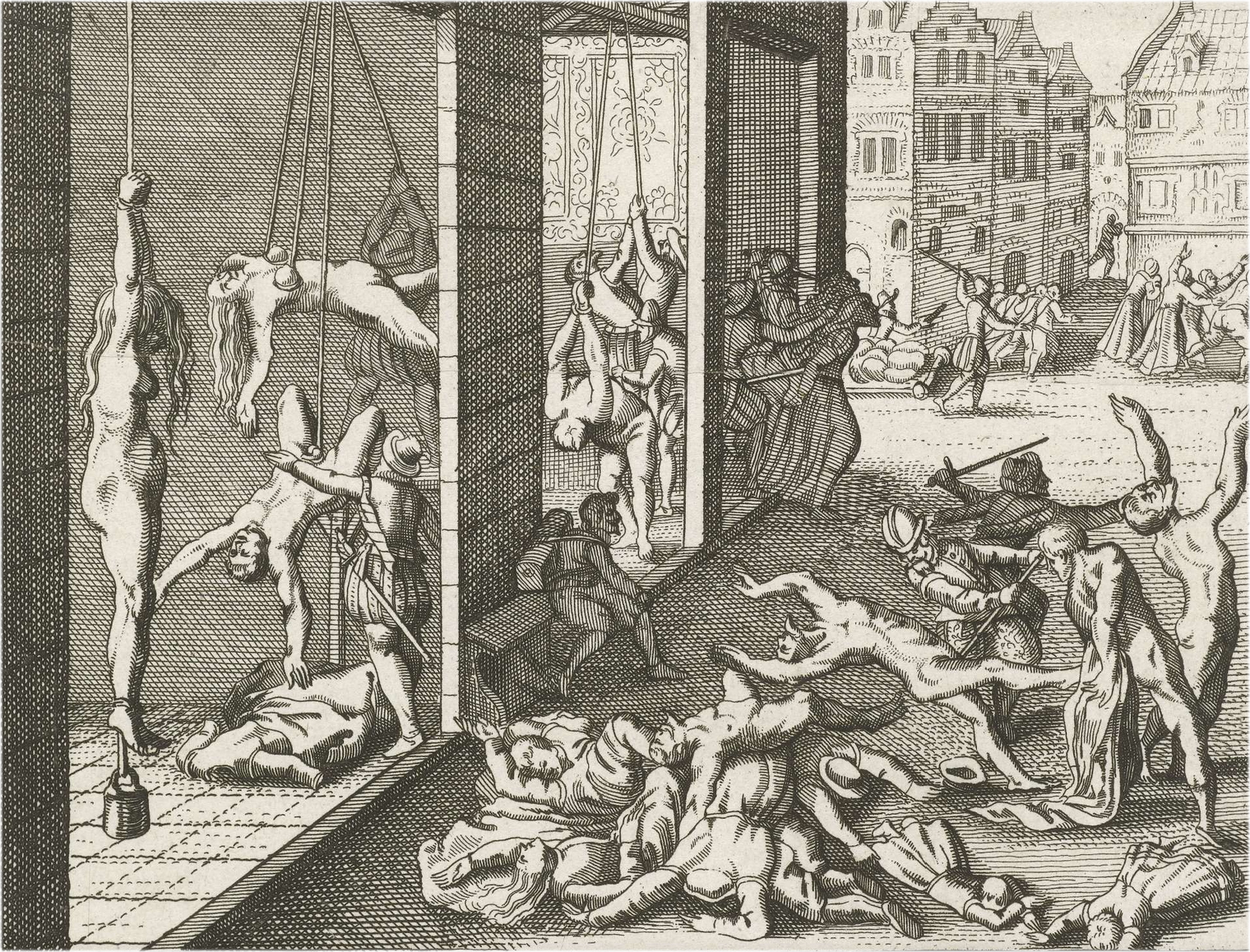
The Sack of Antwerp in 1576, in which 17,000 people died.

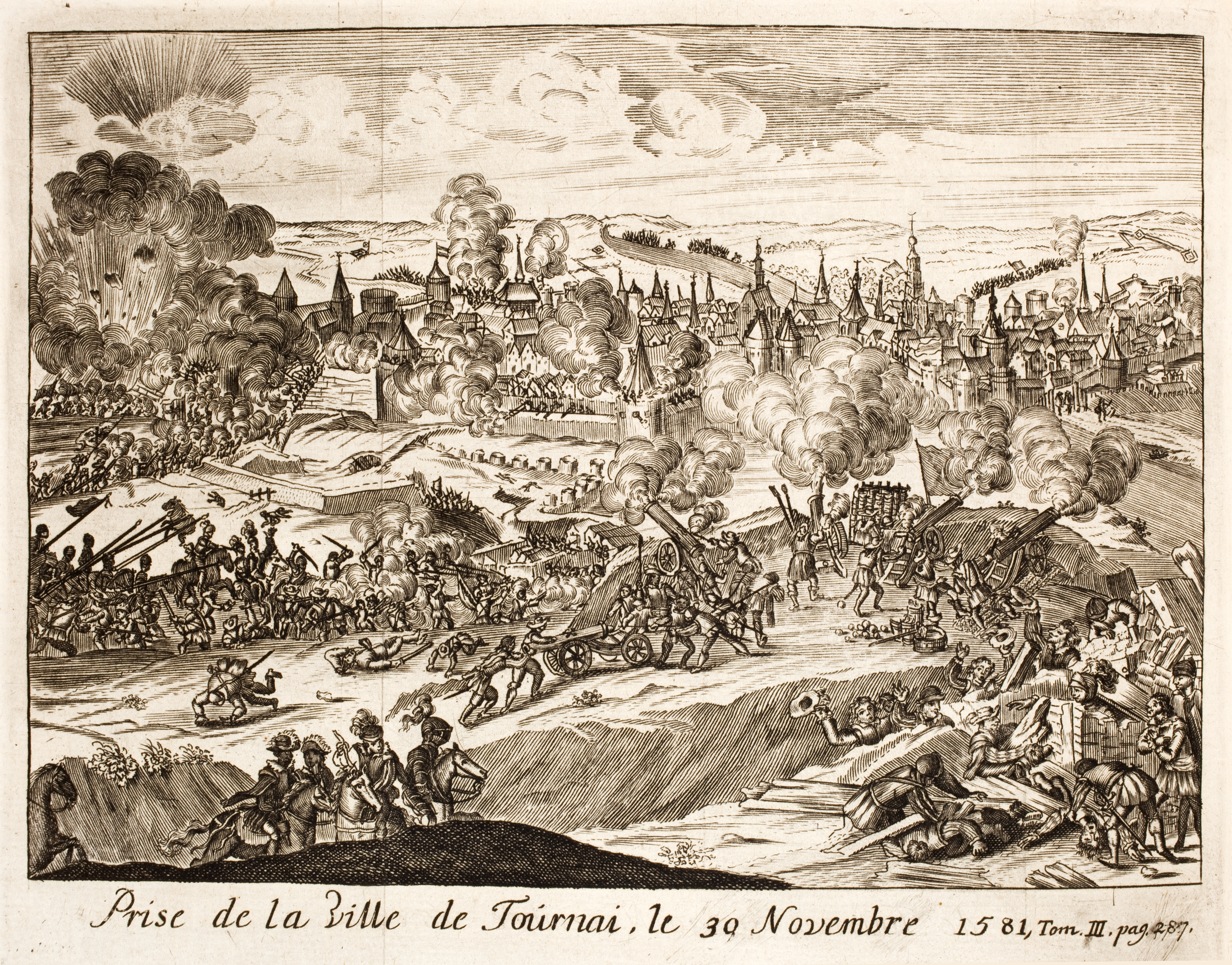
Siege and capture of Tournai, 1581

The northern part of Belgica Regia, comprising seven provinces and eventually forming the Dutch Republic, became increasingly Protestant (specifically, Calvinist), while the larger part comprising the ten southern provinces remained primarily Catholic. This schism, and other cultural differences which had been present since ancient times, launched the Union of Atrecht in the Belgian regions, later followed by the Union of Utrecht in the northern regions. When Philip II ascended the Spanish throne he tried to abolish all Protestantism. Portions of Belgica Regia revolted, eventually resulting in the Eighty Years' War (1568–1648) between Spain and the Dutch Republic. The horrors of this war—massacres, religious violence, mutinies—were precursors to the Thirty Years' War (1618–1648) with which it would merge.

After the Iconoclastic Fury of 1566, Spanish authorities were able to largely gain control of the Low Countries. The most notable event of this period was the Battle of Oosterweel, in which Spanish forces destroyed an army of Dutch Calvinists. King Philip II sent in Fernando Álvarez de Toledo, 3rd Duke of Alba, as Governor-General of the Spanish Netherlands from 1567 to 1573. Alba established a special court called the Council of Troubles (nicknamed the "Council of Blood"). The Blood Council's reign of terror saw it condemn thousands of people to death without due process and drive the nobles into exile while seizing their property. Alba boasted that he had burned or executed 18,600 persons in the Netherlands, in addition to the far greater number he massacred during the war, many of them women and children; 8,000 persons were burned or hanged in one year, and Alba's Flemish victims totalled at least 50,000.

The Dutch Revolt spread to the south in the mid-1570s after the Army of Flanders mutinied for lack of pay and went on the rampage in several cities. At the Battle of Gembloux, on January 31, 1578, the Dutch were followed by Don Juan of Austria, who sent forward a picked force that attacked the rearguard and dispersed it, and then, falling suddenly upon the main body, utterly routed it, killing at least 10,000 rebels. Don Juan of Austria died on October 1, 1578, and was succeeded by Alexander Farnese, Duke of Parma.

With the arrival of large numbers of troops from Spain, Farnese began a campaign of reconquest in the south. He took advantage of the divisions in the ranks of his opponents between the Dutch-speaking Flemish and the Walloon-speaking south to foment growing discord. By doing so he was able to bring back the Walloon provinces to an allegiance to the king. By the treaty of Arras in 1579, he secured the support of the "Malcontents", as the Catholic nobles of the south were styled. The seven northern provinces, controlled by Calvinists, responded with the Union of Utrecht, where they resolved to stick together to fight Spain. Farnese secured his base in Hainaut and Artois, then moved against Brabant and Flanders. He captured many rebel towns in the south: Maastricht (1579), Tournai (1581), Oudenaarde (1582), Dunkirk (1583), Bruges (1584), and Ghent (1584).

On August 17, 1585, Farnese laid siege to Antwerp. Antwerp was one of the richest cities in northern Europe and a rebel stronghold ever since Spanish and Walloon troops sacked it in 1576. The city was open to the sea, strongly fortified, and well defended under the leadership of Marnix van St. Aldegonde. Engineer Sebastian Baroccio cut off all access to the sea by constructing a bridge of boats across the Scheldt. The Dutch sailed fireships, called Hellburners, (Note: Hellburners were a special type of fireship designed by an Italian engineer, Federigo Giambelli.) against the bridge and blew up a 200-foot-long span and killed 800 Spaniards. The besiegers repaired the damage, however, and pressed the investment. The city surrendered in 1585 as 60,000 Antwerp citizens (60% of the pre-siege population) fled north. Brussels, Mechelen and Geertruidenberg fell the same year. Farnese's strategy was to offer generous terms for surrender: there would be no massacres or looting; historic urban privileges were retained; there was a full pardon and amnesty; return to the Catholic Church would be gradual. Catholic refugees from the North regrouped in Cologne and Douai and developed a more militant, tridentine identity. They became the mobilising forces of a popular Counter-Reformation in the South, thereby facilitating the eventual emergence of the state of Belgium.

In 1601, the Spanish besieged Ostend, producing more than 100,000 casualties before Ostend finally fell in 1604. While the former northern part of Belgica Regia, the Seven United Provinces, gained independence, Southern Belgica Regia remained under the rule of Spain (1556–1713). The southern part spoke various romance languages and the northern part used Dutch, yet court accounts were kept in Spanish.

== 17th and 18th centuries ==
During the 17th century, Antwerp continued to be blockaded by the Dutch but became a major European center for industry and art. The Brueghels, Peter Paul Rubens and Van Dyck's baroque paintings were created during this period.

=== Wars between France and the Dutch Republic ===
After the Franco-Spanish War (1635–1659), Spain shifted most of its troops out of Belgium to Iberia. From 1659, Madrid increasingly relied on the aid of allied armies to restrain French ambitions to annex the Spanish Netherlands. Under Louis XIV (1643–1715), France pursued an expansionist policy. France frequently held control of territories in the Southern Netherlands, confronted by various opponents including the Netherlands and Austria. There was the War of Devolution (1667–1668), the Franco-Dutch War (1672–1678), the War of the Reunions (1683–1684), and the Nine Years' War (1688–1697). These were then followed by the War of the Spanish Succession (1701–1714), much of which was fought on Belgian soil. After the victory of Austria and its allies, under the 1714 Treaty of Rastatt, the Belgian and present-day Luxembourg territories (except the lands under the lordship of the Prince-Bishop of Liège) were transferred to the Austrian Habsburgs, thus forming the Austrian Netherlands (1714–1797).

=== Brabant Revolution ===
The Brabant Revolution of 1789–1790 (also known as the Belgian Revolution of 1789–1790) overlapped with the French Revolution, and called for independence from Austrian rule. Brabant rebels, under the command of Jean-André van der Mersch, defeated the Austrians at the Battle of Turnhout and founded the United States of Belgium together with the Prince Bishopric of Liège. The new state was beset by factionalism between the radical "Vonckists", led by Jan Frans Vonck and the more conservative "Statists" of Henri Van der Noot. Businessmen with widescale operations generally supported the Statists, while the Vonckists attracted small business and members of the trade guilds. They called for independence from Austria but were conservative in social and religious questions. By November 1790, the revolt had been crushed and the Habsburg monarchy had returned to power.

=== French control ===
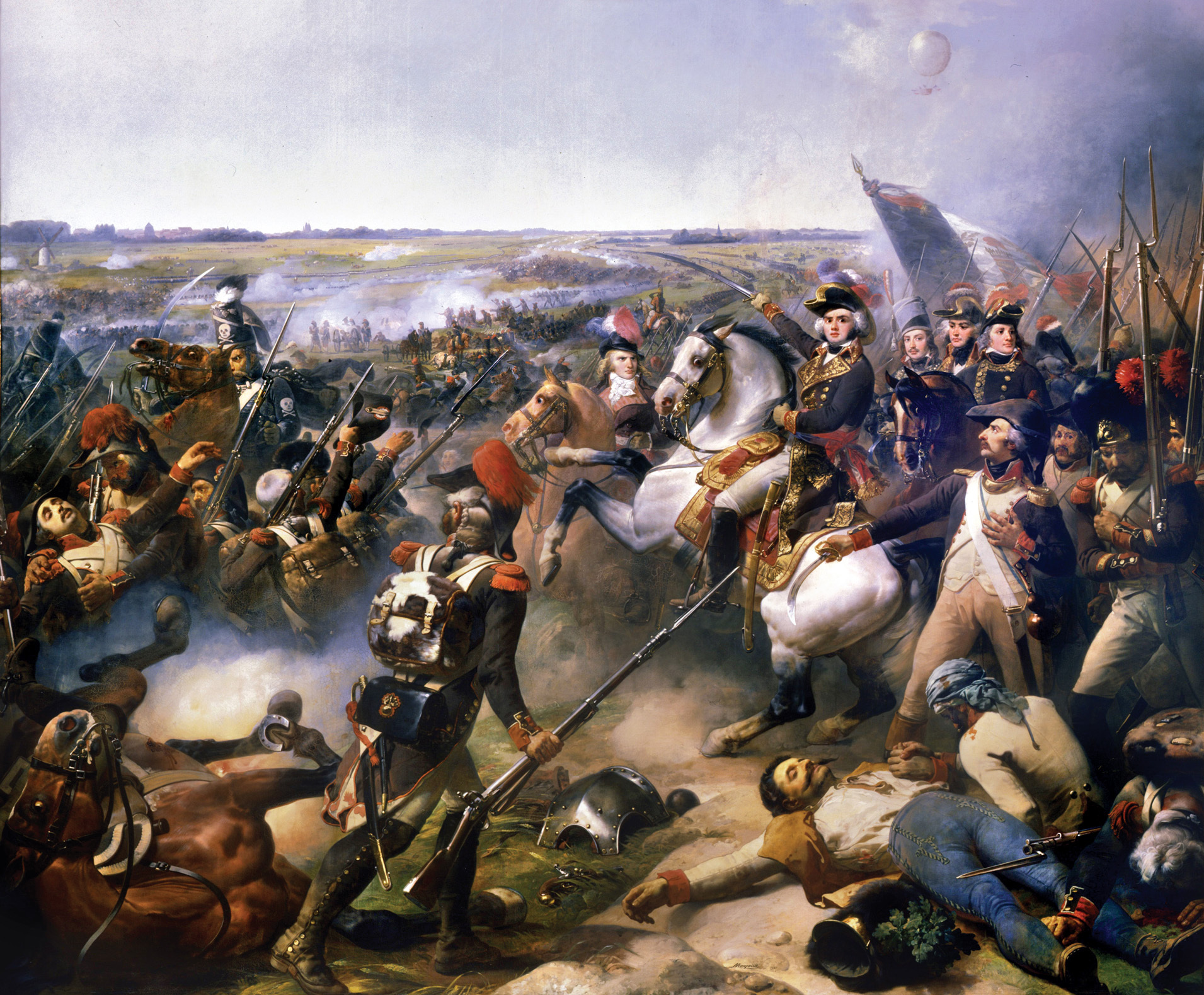
The Battle of Fleurus, which led to the French conquest of the Austrian Netherlands

Following the Campaigns of 1794 of the French Revolutionary Wars, Belgium Austriacum was invaded and annexed by France in 1795, ending Habsburg rule. Southern Netherlands and the territory of Liège was divided into nine united départements and became an integral part of France. The Prince-Bishopric of Liège was dissolved and divided over the départements Meuse-Inférieure and Ourte. The Holy Roman Emperor confirmed the loss of Southern Netherlands, by the Treaty of Campo Formio, in 1797.

New rulers were sent in by Paris. Belgian men were drafted into the French wars and heavily taxed. Resistance was strong in every sector, as Belgian nationalism emerged to oppose French rule. The French legal system, however, was adopted, with its equal legal rights, and abolition of class distinctions. Belgium now had a government bureaucracy selected by merit, but it was not at all popular. Until the establishment of the Consulate in 1799, Catholics were heavily repressed by the French. The first University of Leuven was closed in 1797 and churches were plundered.

During this early period of the French rule, the Belgian economy was completely paralyzed as taxes had to be paid in gold and silver coin while goods bought by the French were paid for with worthless assignats. During this period of systematic exploitation, about 800,000 Belgians fled the Southern Netherlands. The French occupation of Belgium led to further suppression of the Dutch language across the country: French became the only accepted language in public life as well as in economic, political, and social affairs. The measures of the successive French governments and in particular the 1798 massive conscription into the French army were unpopular everywhere, especially in Flemish regions, where it sparked the Peasants' War. The brutal suppression of the Peasants' War marks the starting point of the modern Flemish movement.

France promoted commerce and capitalism, paving the way for the ascent of the bourgeoisie and the rapid growth of manufacturing and mining. In economics, therefore, the nobility declined while the middle class Belgian entrepreneurs flourished because of their inclusion in a large market, paving the way for Belgium's leadership role after 1815 in the Industrial Revolution. Godechot finds that after the annexation, Belgium's business community supported the new regime, unlike the peasants, who remained hostile. Annexation opened new markets in France for wool and other goods from Belgium. Bankers and merchants helped finance and supply the French army. France ended the prohibition against seaborne trade on the Scheldt that had been enforced by the Netherlands. Antwerp quickly became a major French port with a world trade, and Brussels grew as well. In 1814, the Allies drove out Napoleon and ended French rule. The plan was to join Belgium and the Netherlands, under Dutch control. Napoleon returned to power briefly during the Hundred Days in 1815, but on his way to recapturing Brussels as his intended power base, was finally defeated at the Battle of Waterloo, 12 miles (19 km) south of that city.

== United Kingdom of the Netherlands ==
After Napoleon's defeat at Waterloo in 1815, the major victorious powers (Britain, Austria, Prussia, and Russia) agreed at the Congress of Vienna on uniting the former Austrian Netherlands (Belgium Austriacum) and the former Seven United Provinces, creating the United Kingdom of the Netherlands as a buffer state against any future French invasions. This was under the rule of a Protestant king, William I. Most of the small and ecclesiastical states in the Holy Roman Empire were given to larger states at this time, and this included the Prince-Bishopric of Liège which now became formally part of the United Kingdom of the Netherlands.

The enlightened despot William I, who reigned from 1815 to 1840, had almost unlimited constitutional power, the constitution having been written by a number of notable people chosen by him. As despot, he had no difficulty in accepting some of the changes resulting from the social transformation of the previous 25 years, including equality of all before the law. However, he resurrected the estates as a political class and elevated a large number of people to the nobility. Voting rights were still limited, and only the nobility were eligible for seats in the upper house.

William I was a Calvinist and intolerant of the Roman Catholic majority in the southern parts of his newly created kingdom. He promulgated the "Fundamental Law of Holland", with some modifications. This suppressed the clergy, abolished the privileges of the Roman Catholic Church, and guaranteed equal protection to every religious creed and the same civil and political rights to every subject. It reflected the spirit of the French Revolution and in so doing displeased the bishops in the south.

William I actively promoted economic modernization. His authority was shared with a legislature partly chosen by himself and partly elected by the more prosperous citizens under the constitution. Government was in the hands of national ministries of state, and the old provinces were reestablished in name only. The government was now fundamentally unitary, and all authority flowed from the center. The first fifteen years of the Kingdom showed progress and prosperity, as industrialization proceeded rapidly in the south, where the Industrial Revolution allowed entrepreneurs and labor to combine in a new textile industry, powered by local coal mines. There was little industry in the northern provinces, but most of the former Dutch overseas colonies were restored, and highly profitable trade resumed after a 25-year hiatus. Economic liberalism combined with moderate monarchical authoritarianism to accelerate the adaptation of the Netherlands to the new conditions of the 19th century.

=== Unrest in the southern provinces ===
Protestants controlled the new country, although they formed only a quarter of the population. (Note: For a religion map see http://www.quirksmode.org/politics/kuyper.html) In theory, Roman Catholics had full legal equality; in practice few held high state or military offices. The king insisted that schools in the South end their traditional teaching of Roman Catholic doctrine, even though almost everyone there was of that faith. Socially, the French-speaking Walloons strongly resented the king's policy to make Dutch the language of government. There was also growing outrage at the king's insensitivity to social differences. According to Schama, there was growing hostility to the Dutch government.

Political liberals in the south had their own grievances, especially regarding the king's authoritarian style; he seemed uncaring about the issue of regionalism, flatly vetoing a proposal for a French-language teacher-training college in francophone Liège. Finally, all factions in the South complained of unfair representation in the national legislature. The south was industrializing faster and was more prosperous than the north, leading to resentment of northern arrogance and political domination.

The outbreak of revolution in France in 1830 was used as a signal for revolt. The demand at first was Home Rule for "Belgium", as the southern provinces were now being called, rather than separation. Eventually, revolutionaries began demanding total independence.

== Belgian revolution ==
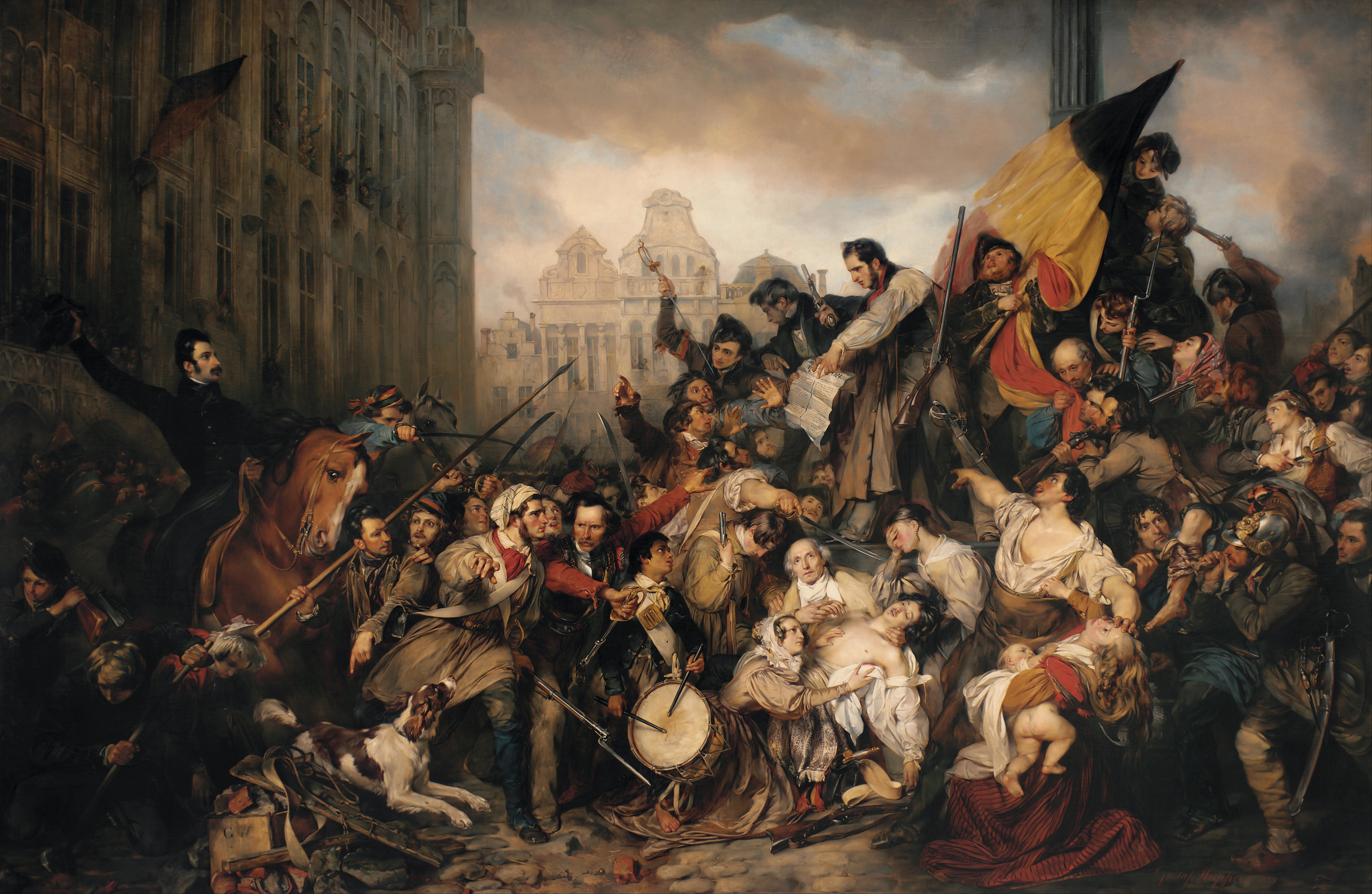
Episode of the Belgian Revolution of 1830, Egide Charles Gustave Wappers (1834), in the Musée d'Art Ancien, Brussels

The Belgian Revolution broke out in August 1830 when crowds, stirred by a performance of Auber's La Muette de Portici at the Brussels opera house of La Monnaie, spilled out onto the streets singing patriotic songs. Violent street fighting soon broke out. The liberal bourgeoisie, who had initially been at the forefront of the burgeoning revolution, were appalled by the violence and became willing to accept a compromise with the Dutch.

On a political level, the Belgians felt significantly under-represented in the Netherlands' elected Lower Assembly and disliked the unpopular Prince of Orange, the future William II who was the representative of King William I in Brussels. The French-speaking Walloons also felt ostracised in a majority Dutch-speaking country. There were also significant religious grievances felt by the majority Catholic Belgians.

The king assumed the protest would blow over. He announced an amnesty for all revolutionaries, except foreigners and the leaders. When this did not succeed he sent in the army. Dutch forces were able to penetrate the Schaerbeek Gate into Brussels, but the advance was stalled in the Parc de Bruxelles under sniper fire. Royal troops elsewhere met determined resistance from revolutionaries at makeshift barricades. It is estimated that there were no more than 1,700 revolutionaries (described by the French Ambassador as an "undisciplined rabble") in Brussels at the time, faced with over 6,000 Dutch troops. However, faced with strong opposition, Dutch troops were ordered out of the capital on the night of 26 September. There were also battles around the country as revolutionaries clashed with Dutch forces. Eight Dutch warships bombarded Antwerp following its capture by revolutionary forces.

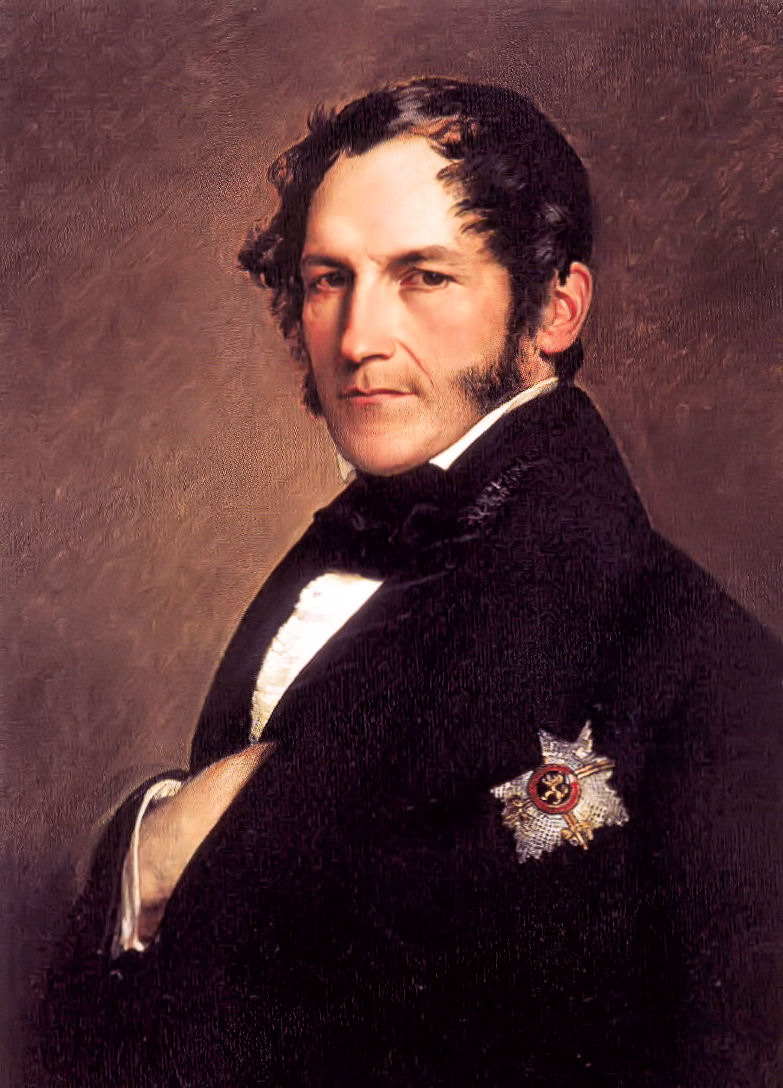
Portrait of Leopold I who became the first King of the Belgians in 1831

Belgian independence was not allowed by the 1815 Congress of Vienna; nevertheless the revolutionaries were regarded sympathetically by the major powers of Europe. In November 1830, the London Conference of 1830 or "Belgian Congress" (comprising delegates from Great Britain, France, Russia, Prussia and Austria) ordered an armistice on November 4. At the end of November Britain and France proposed no military intervention and the establishment of an independent kingdom of Belgium, which was accepted by the other three more conservative participants, who had favored a military intervention. A protocol signed on 20 January 1831 stated that Belgium would be formed of the regions that did not belong to the North in 1790. The new kingdom would be obliged to remain neutral in foreign affairs. The British foreign secretary Lord Palmerston strongly backed the Prince of Orange as the new king. The Prince proved to be unacceptable to William I, his father, as well as to the French. Finally, Palmerston came up with his second choice, Leopold I of Saxe-Coburg, who was accepted by all. On July 21, 1831, the first "King of the Belgians" was inaugurated. The date of his acceptance of the constitution – 21 July 1831 – is marked a national holiday.

The liberal bourgeoisie hastily formed a provisional government under Charles Rogier to negotiate with the Dutch, officially declaring Belgian independence on 4 October 1830. The Belgian National Congress was formed to draw up a constitution. Under the new constitution, Belgium became a sovereign, independent state with a constitutional monarchy. However, the constitution severely limited voting rights to the French-speaking haute-bourgeoisie and the clergy, in a country where French was not the majority language. The Catholic church was afforded a good deal of freedom from state intervention.

The state of conflict (but not open warfare) with the Netherlands lasted another eight years, but in 1839, the Treaty of London was signed between the two countries and the five great powers of Europe (Austria, France, Prussia, Russia, and the United Kingdom). By the treaty of 1839, the eastern part of Luxembourg did not join Belgium, but remained a possession of the Netherlands until different inheritance laws caused it to separate as an independent Grand Duchy (the western, French-speaking part of Luxembourg became the Belgian province of that name). Belgium lost Eastern Limburg, Zeelandic Flanders, French Flanders and Eupen. The Netherlands retained the former two while French Flanders remained in French possession. Eupen remained within the German Confederation. The five great powers pledged to protect Belgium's neutrality in the future. In 1914, the violation of Belgium's neutrality would be the stated Casus belli of Britain's entry into World War I.

== Independence to World War I ==
=== Industrial Revolution ===
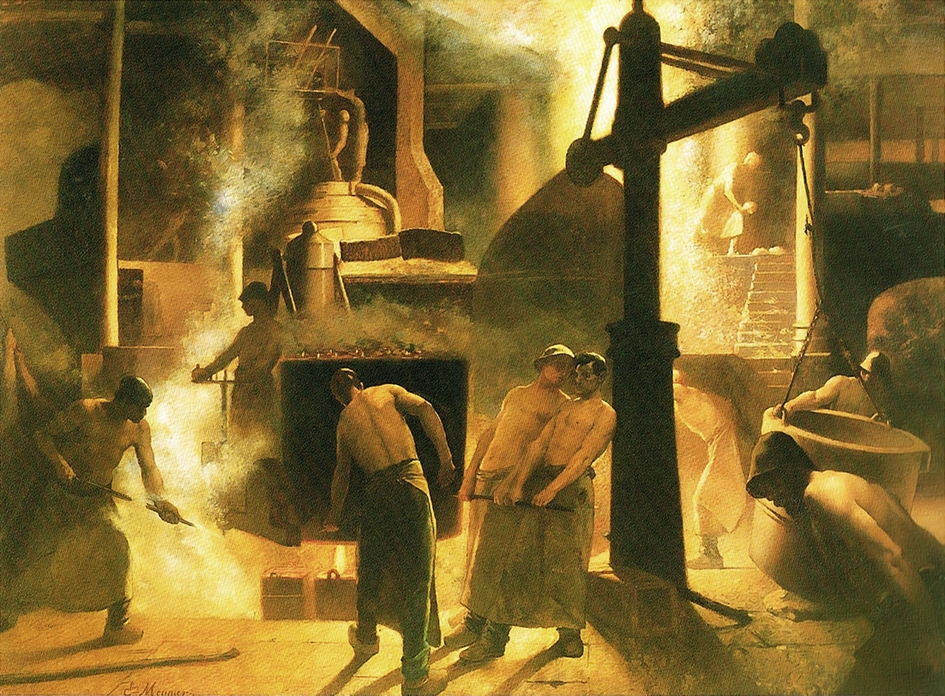
Painting of steel production in Ougrée by Constantin Meunier (1885)

Most of society was highly traditional, especially in rural areas, and the quality of education was low. Nevertheless, Belgium was the second country, after Britain, in which the industrial revolution took place. It developed into an open economy focused on industrial exports with strong ties between the banking sector and industry. Industrialization took place in Wallonia starting in the mid-1820s, and especially after 1830. The availability of cheap coal was a main factor that attracted entrepreneurs. Coke blast furnaces as well as puddling and rolling mills were built in the coal mining areas around Liège and Charleroi. The leader was a transplanted Englishman, John Cockerill. His factories at Seraing integrated all stages of production, from engineering to the supply of raw materials, as early as 1825.

Industry spread through the Sillon industriel ("industrial district"), Haine, Sambre and Meuse valleys. By 1830 when iron became important the Belgian coal industry had been long-established, and used steam engines for pumping. Coal was sold to local mills and railways as well as to France and Prussia. The textile industry, based on cotton and flax, employed about half of the industrial workforce for much of the industrial period. Ghent was the premier industrial city in Belgium until the 1880s, when the center of growth moved to Liège, with its steel industry.

Wallonia had rich coalfields over much of its area. Deep mines were not required at first so there were a large number of small operations. There was a complex legal system for concessions; often multiple layers had different owners. Entrepreneurs started going deeper and deeper (thanks to the innovation of steam pumping). In 1790, the maximum depth of mines was 220 meters. By 1856, the average depth in the area west of Mons was 361, and in 1866, some pits had reached down 700 and 900 meters; one was 1,065 meters deep, probably the deepest coal mine in Europe at this time. Gas explosions were a serious problem, and Belgium had high fatality rates. By the late 19th century the seams were becoming exhausted and the steel industry was importing some coal from the Ruhr.

Cheap and readily available coal attracted firms producing metals and glass, both of which required considerable amounts of coal, and so regions around coal fields became highly industrialised. The Sillon industriel, and in particular the Pays Noir around Charleroi, were the centre of the steel industry until the Second World War.

==== Railways ====
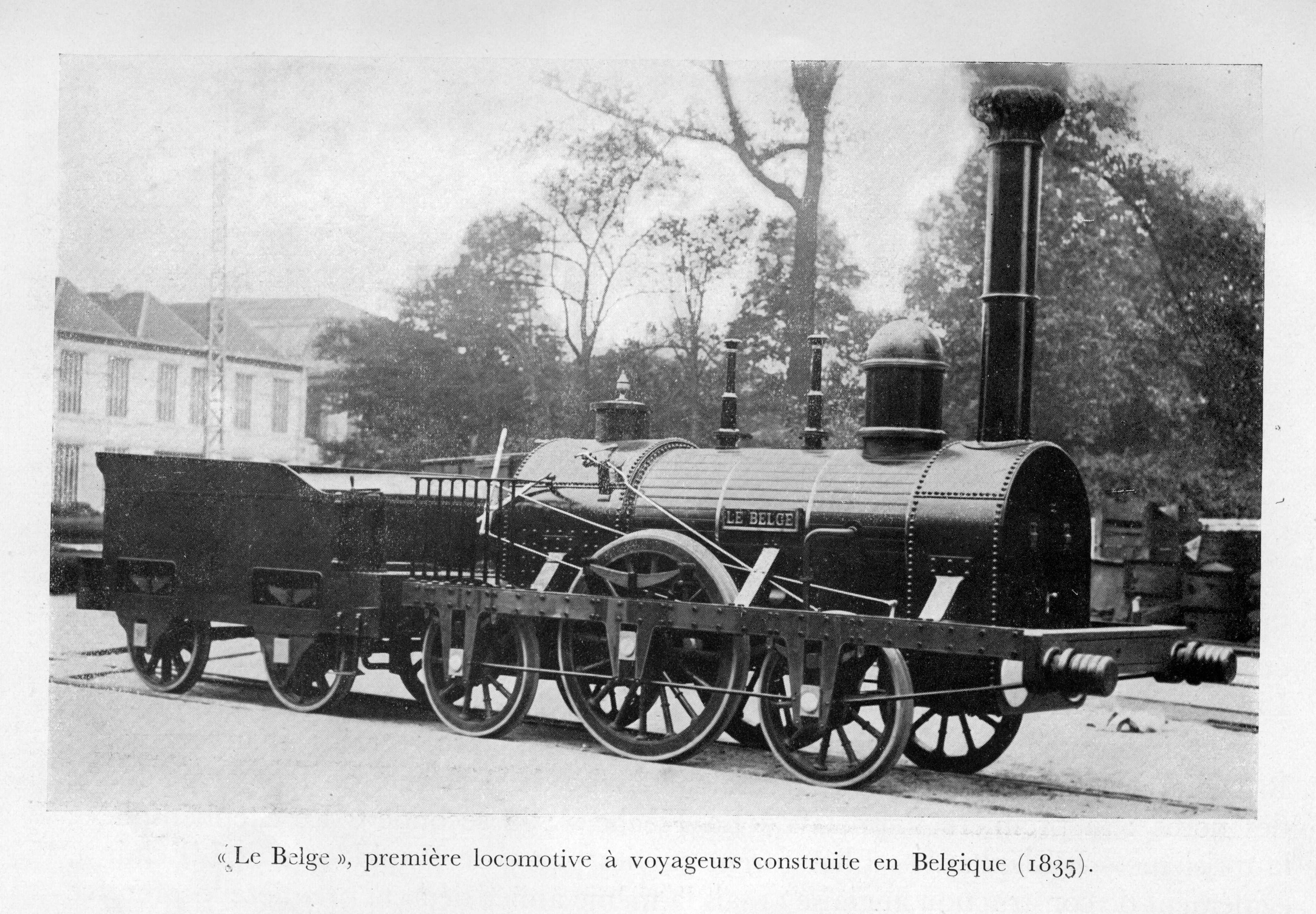
The first Belgian-produced steam locomotive, "The Belgian" ("Le Belge") built in 1835

The nation provided an ideal model for showing the value of the railways for speeding the Industrial Revolution. After 1830, the new nation decided to stimulate industry. It funded a simple cross-shaped system that connected the major cities, ports and mining areas, and linked to neighboring countries. Belgium thus became the railway center of the region. The system was very soundly built along British lines, so that profits and wages were low but the infrastructure necessary for rapid industrial growth was put in place. Léopold I went on to build the first railway in continental Europe in 1835, between Brussels and Mechelen. The development of smaller railways in Belgium, notably the Liège–Jemappes line, was launched by tendering contracts to private companies which "became the model for the extension of small local railways all over the low countries."

By the 1900s, Belgium was a major exporter of trams and other rail components, exporting vast quantities of railway materials. In South America, 3,800 kilometers of track were owned by Belgian firms, with a further 1,500 kilometers in China. One Belgian entrepreneur, Édouard Empain, known as the "Tramway King", built many public transport systems across the world, including the Paris Métro.

Other important businesses included Cockerill-Sambre (steel), the chemical factories of Ernest Solvay, and the firearms maker Fabrique Nationale de Herstal.

=== Liberalism and Catholicism ===
Before the arrival of the socialists in the 1890s, the nation was polarised between the conservative Catholic Party and the secular Liberal Party. The Liberals were anticlerical and wanted to reduce the power of the Church. The conflict came to a head during the "First School War" of 1879–1884 as Liberal attempts to introduce a greater level of secularism in primary education were beaten back by outraged Catholics. The School War ushered in a period of Catholic Party dominance in Belgian politics that lasted (almost unbroken) until 1917.

Religious conflict also extended to university education, where secular universities like the Free University of Brussels competed with Catholic universities like the Catholic University of Leuven.

=== Linguistic conflict ===
The majority of those in the north of the country spoke Dutch and other Low Franconian languages while those in the south spoke Langues d'oïl such as French, Walloon and Picard. French became the official language of government after the separation from the Netherlands in 1830 and Belgian cultural life was especially dominated by the French influence, reinforced by economic domination of the industrial south. Flemish was "reduced to the tongue of a second-class culture." Parts of the Flemish population reacted against this. This was partly due to a sense of growing Flemish identity. Flemish victories, like the Battle of the Golden Spurs in 1302 were celebrated and a Flemish cultural movement, led by figures like Hendrik Conscience was born. About the same time a Walloon Movement emerged, led by Jules Destrée and based on loyalty to the French language. Universal suffrage meant the Francophones were a political minority, so the Walloon Movement concentrated on protecting French where it had a majority, and did not contest the expanded use of Dutch in Flemish areas.

The Flemish goal of linguistic equality (especially in schools and courts) was finally achieved by a series of laws in the 1920s and 1930s. Dutch became the language of government, education, and the courts in the northern provinces of East and West Flanders, Antwerp, Limburg, and eastern Brabant. French remained the official language in Wallonia; Brussels, which had seen a major language shift to French, became an officially bilingual region. Meanwhile, a small separatist Flemish movement had emerged; the Germans had supported it during the war, and in the 1930s it turned fascist. In the Second World War it collaborated with the Nazis.

=== Foreign relations and military policy ===
In the mid-1860s during the "Mexican Adventure", around 1,500 Belgian soldiers joined the "Belgian Expeditionary Corps", better known as the "Belgian Legion" to fight for Emperor Maximilian I, whose wife Charlotte was the daughter of Leopold I of Belgium.

Belgium was not a belligerent in the Franco-Prussian War 1870–71, but the proximity of the war led to the mobilisation of the army. After the conflict, there was talk of modernising the military. The system of Remplacement (whereby wealthy Belgians conscripted into the military could pay for a "replacement") was abolished and an improved system of conscription implemented. These reforms, led by d'Anethan under pressure from Leopold II, divided Belgian politics. The Catholics united with the Liberals under Frère-Orban to oppose them, and the reforms were finally defeated when d'Anethan's government fell during an unrelated scandal. Eventually, the military was reformed. The 1909 System instituted compulsory military service of eight years on active duty and five years in the reserves. This swelled the size of the Belgian army to over 100,000 well-trained men. Construction of a chain of forts along the border was intensified, and let to a series of very modern fortifications, including the so-called "National redoubt" at Antwerp, at the fortified positions of Liège and Namur, many of them designed by the Belgian fortress architect, Henri Alexis Brialmont.

=== Rise of the Socialist Party and the trade unions ===
The economy was stagnant during the long depression of 1873–1895, as prices and wages fell and labour unrest grew. The Belgian Workers' Party was founded in 1885 in Brussels. It issued the Charter of Quaregnon in 1894 calling for an end to capitalism and a thorough reorganization of society. During the late 19th century, general strikes became an established aspect of the political process. Between 1892 and 1961, there were 20 major strikes, including 7 general strikes. Many of these had overtly political motives, like the 1893 General Strike that helped achieve universal male suffrage.

On several occasions, Belgian general strikes escalated into violence. In 1893, soldiers fired on the striking crowd, killing several. Karl Marx wrote, "There exists but one country in the civilised world where every strike is eagerly and joyously turned into a pretext for the official massacre of the Working Class. That country of single blessedness is Belgium!"

Nevertheless, Belgium created a welfare net particularly early, thanks in part to the trade unions. Sickness compensation was established in 1894, voluntary old-age insurance in 1900 and unemployment insurance in 1907, achieving good coverage nationwide much more quickly than its neighbours. Belgium also witnessed a rise in the number of co-operatives, with 1200 in existence by 1910 with nearly 200,000 members.

=== Catholic governments and social policy ===
Various reforms were introduced under the Catholic governments that led Belgium from the late nineteenth century onwards. In 1887, the system of paying workers in kind and in pubs was outlawed, and joint industrial and labour councils were established. In 1889, labour law councils were reformed, "with employers facing increasing working class representation." That same year, legislation on social housing and women's and child labour was reformed. In 1900, the first law on old-age pensions was approved, while a 1903 law on industrial accidents "stipulated it was no longer up to the worker to prove his innocence." From 1900 onwards, Catholic governments began subsidising unemployment funds, health services and savings banks. Mandatory Sunday rest was approved in 1905, while other reforms were carried out such as reduced working hours for miners, the outlawing of night work for women, and pensions for the military and civil service. Under a law that came into effect in 1892, the employment of women and children under the age of 21 was prohibited. In 1890, a fund of providence and relief for victims of industrial accidents was introduced by law. In 1894, state subsidies were established for sickness funds.

Following the elections of 1894 and 1896, according to one study, "The Catholics continued steadily carrying out their programme of social reforms, and various Acts were passed for the welfare of the working-classes-old-age pensions, workmen's dwellings, employers liability, subsidies to savings banks and mutual societies for the encouragement of thrift." An 1896 law made workshop regulations compulsory for all companies employing at least 10 workers (which changed to 5 workers in 1900), while other social policy measures included employers' industrial accident funds in 1903 and small state subsidies to voluntary unemployment funds in 1907. In 1914, compulsory education was introduced for children between 6 and 14. A National Crisis Fund as set up at the end of 1920 which, according to one study, "marked an important step towards general compensation for involuntary unemployment." Healthcare subsidising by the national government was expanded, as characterised by disability funds in 1912, general medical care (expenses for general practitioner and pharmacist) in 1920, an anti-tuberculosis fund in 1921, basic treatment in 1927, expansion from general to particular medical care (surgery, hospitalisation, preventive medicine); cancer in 1931, and insurance for women and families (marriage premium and premium for death of spouse); death benefits in 1936. In 1919 a scheme for the war-injured was introduced and for the victims of occupational diseases in 1927. From 1928 onwards, means-tested allowances were provided to physically disabled persons. In August 1930, a law was passed making family allowances compulsory in private industry. In 1921, an Act was passed providing for an 8-hour day and 48-hour working week, and in 1936 annual paid holidays were introduced in most industries.

=== Voting rights ===
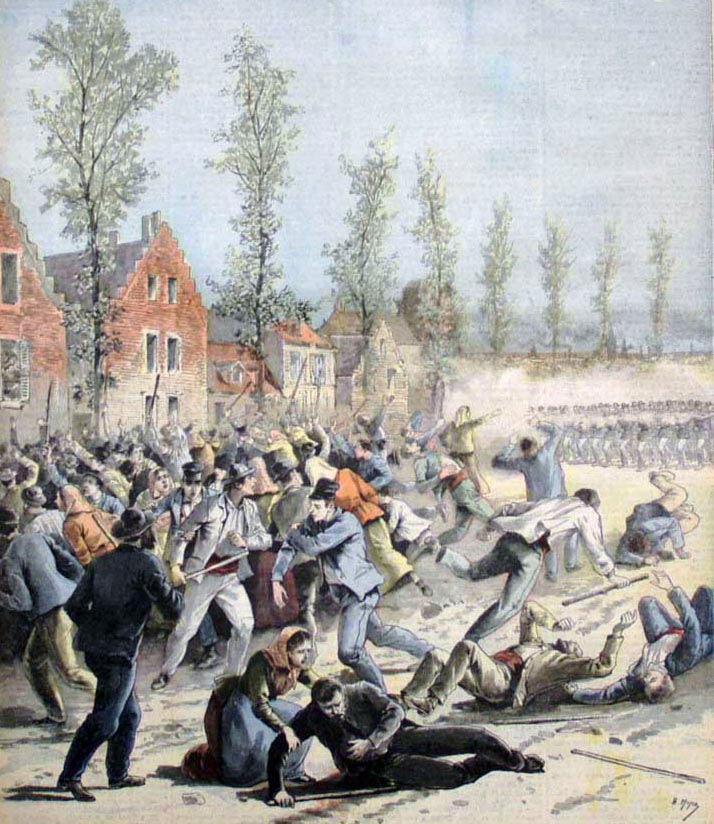
The "Fusilade of Mons" during the 1893 strike as the Borains are fired on by the Garde Civique during the protests for universal suffrage.

In 1893, the government rejected a proposal for universal male suffrage. Outraged, the Belgian Labour Party called a General Strike; by April 17, there were more than 50,000 strikers. Violent confrontations broke out with the Garde Civique (the Civil Guard or militia) around the country. The government soon backed down, and passed male universal suffrage but reduced its impact by creating plural votes based on wealth, education and age. The Catholic conservatives, with 68% of the seats, remained in power.

Again, in 1902 and 1913, there were general strikes aimed at forcing electoral reform and ending the system of plural voting. After the 1913 strike, a commission was created and was expected to remove plural voting, but implementation was delayed by the 1914 German invasion. In 1918, King Albert forged a post-war "Government of National Union" and brought about one man, one vote universal male suffrage. The last restrictions on women's voting were lifted in 1948.

=== Culture ===
Artistic and literary culture in Belgium began a revival towards the late 19th century. A core element of Belgian nationalism was the scientific study of its national history. The movement was led by Godefroid Kurth, a student of the German historian Ranke. Kurth taught modern historical methods to his students at the University of Liège. The most prominent Belgian historian was Henri Pirenne, who was influenced by this method during his period as a student of Kurth.

==== Architecture and Art Nouveau ====
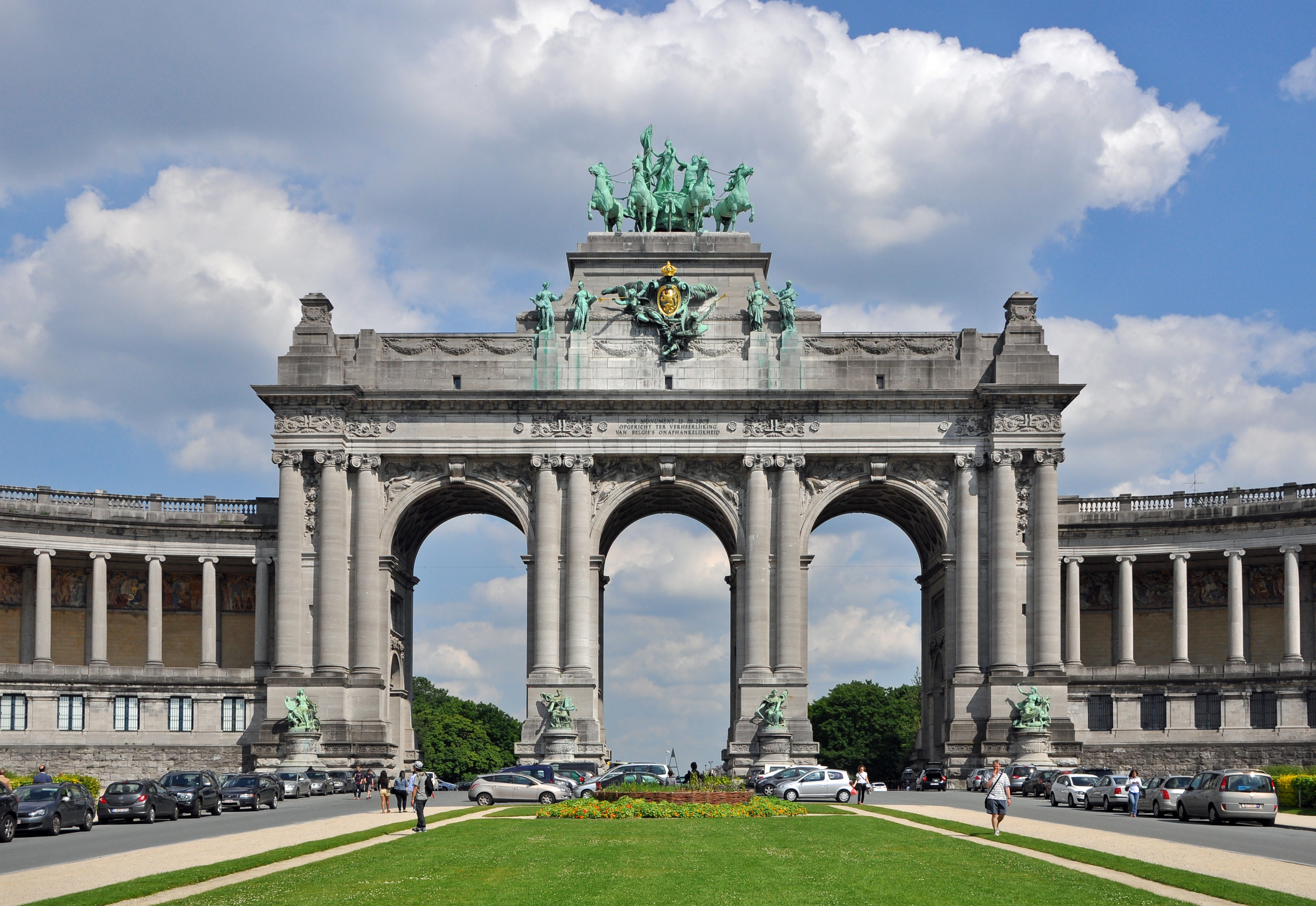
The Cinquantenaire/Jubelpark memorial arcade, built in 1905

At the end of the 19th century and the beginning of the 20th century, monumental Historicism and Neoclassicism dominated the urban Belgian landscape, particularly in government buildings. Championed in part by King Leopold II, the style can be seen in the Palais de Justice (designed by Joseph Poelaert) and the Cinquantenaire.

Nevertheless, Brussels became one of the major European cities for the development of the Art Nouveau style in the late 1890s. The architects Victor Horta, Paul Hankar, and Henry van de Velde became particularly famous for their designs, many of which survive today in Brussels. Four buildings designed by Horta are listed by UNESCO World Heritage Sites. Horta's largest work, the Maison du Peuple was demolished in 1960.

== Empire ==
Stanard rejects the widely held notion that Belgians were "reluctant imperialists". He argues that "ordinary people came to understand and support the colony. Belgians not only sustained the empire in significant ways, but many became convinced imperialists, evidenced by the widespread, enduring and eagerly embraced propaganda in favor of the Congo."

=== Congo Free State and Belgian Congo ===
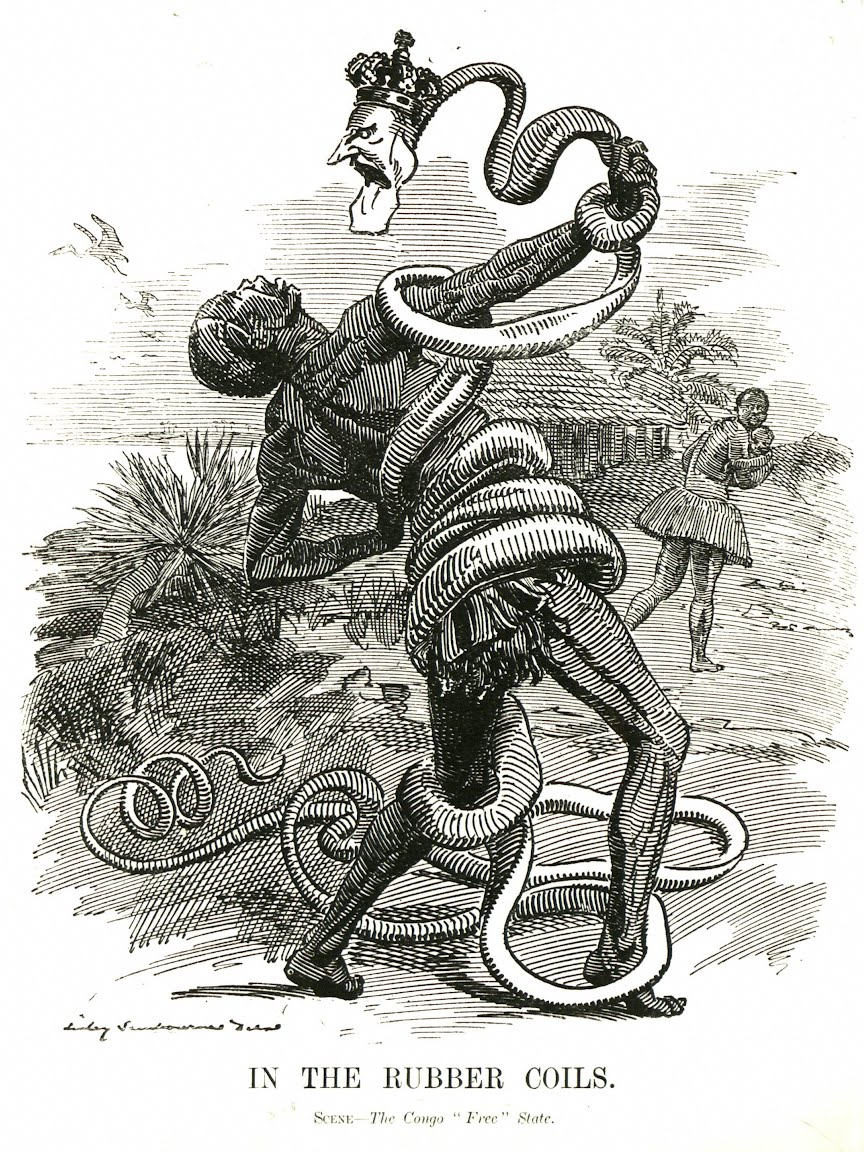
A 1906 British Punch cartoon depicting Leopold II as a rubber vine entangling a Congolese man

King Leopold II of Belgium had been the principal shareholder in the Belgian trading company which established trading stations on the lower Congo between 1879 and 1884. At the Berlin Conference of 1884–1885 the future Congo was personally assigned to Leopold, who named the territory the Congo Free State. It was originally intended to be an international Free Trade zone, open to all European traders. The area included in this territory was just under 1 million square miles (2.590.000 square kilometers), almost 80 times the size of Belgium. The first infrastructure projects took place during the Free State period, such as a railway that ran from the Léopoldville to the coast which took several years to complete.

The era of the Congo Free State is most infamous for the large number of atrocities committed under it. Since it was, in effect, a business venture, run by a private company headed by Leopold himself, it aimed to gain as much money as possible from primary exports. Leopold's personal fortune was greatly increased through the proceeds of selling Congolese rubber, which had never previously been mass-produced in such quantities, to the growing market for tyres. Between 1885 and 1908, as many as eight million Congolese died of exploitation and disease while the birth rate dropped. These are only rough estimates, as no figures are available for the period.

To enforce the rubber quotas, the Force Publique (FP) was created. While the Force Publique was nominally a military force – it would later fight during both the First and Second World Wars) – during the Congo Free State period its primary duties involved enforcing rubber quotas via imprisonment, rape, abduction, forced labor, or summary executions. Severing of limbs was sometimes used. A Belgian captain, Leon Rom, ornamented his flowerbeds with the heads of 21 natives.

Following reports from missionaries, there was growing moral outrage, particularly in Britain and the United States. The Congo Reform Association, led by Edmund Dene Morel, was particularly important in this campaign, and published numerous best-selling tracts and pamphlets (including Red Rubber) which reached a vast public. King Leopold appointed and financed his own commission to put these accusations to rest, but it too confirmed the atrocities.

Equestrian Statue of Leopold II, Place du Trône/Troonplein, Brussels

The Belgian parliament long refused to take over the colony, which was considered a financial burden. In 1908, the Belgian parliament responded to the international pressure, annexing the Free State. After World War II, Belgium was criticized by the United Nations for making no progress on the political front. Despite propaganda campaigns within Belgium, few Belgians showed much interest in the colony. Also, the government limited the possibility of Congolese settling in Belgium.

Political rights were not granted to the Africans until 1956 when the growing middle class (the so-called Évolué) received the franchise, and the economy remained relatively undeveloped despite the mineral wealth of Katanga. At the Round Table Talks on independence, Belgium requested a process of gradual independence over four years, but following a series of riots in 1959, the decision was made to bring forward independence in matter of months. The chaos in which Belgium departed the Congo caused the secession of rich Western-backed province Katanga and the prolonged civil war known as the Congo Crisis.

=== China 1902–1931 ===
The Belgian Tianjin Concession in China was established in 1902. There was little investment and no settlement. However it led to a contract to supply an electric light and trolley system. In 1906, Tianjin became the first city in China with a modern public transportation system. The supply of electricity and lighting and the trolley business were profitable ventures. All the rolling stock was supplied by Belgian industries and by 1914, the network also reached nearby Austrian, French, Italian, Japanese and Russian concessions.

=== Ruanda-Urundi 1917–1961 ===
After the defeat of Germany in World War I, Belgium inherited League of Nations mandates over Ruanda-Urundi.

The colony was administered in a similar way as by the former German administrators, continuing policies such as ethnic identity cards. In 1959, moves towards independence could be seen in the territory and agitation by PARMEHUTU, a Hutu political party, was evident. In 1960, the Rwandan Revolution occurred and Belgium changed the appointments of chiefs and vice-chiefs to promote Hutus.

Ruanda-Urundi gained independence in 1962 and its two regions, Rwanda and Burundi, separated.

== World War I ==
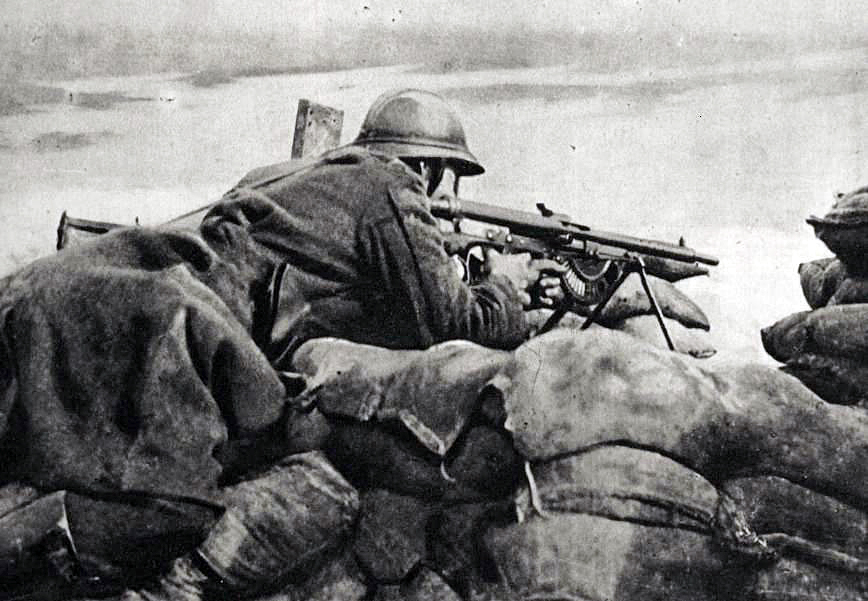
A Belgian machine gunner at the front lines in 1918, firing a Chauchat machine gun.

When World War I began, Germany invaded neutral Belgium and Luxembourg as part of the Schlieffen Plan, trying to take Paris quickly. The threat to France caused Britain to enter the war, using the 1839 agreement as justification. The Belgian army is remembered for their stubborn resistance during the early days of the war, with the army – around a tenth the size of the Germany Army – holding up the German offensive for nearly a month, giving the French and British forces time to prepare for the Marne counteroffensive. The German invaders treated any resistance—such as sabotaging rail lines—as illegal and subversive, and shot the offenders and burned buildings in retaliation.

Belgium had a prosperous economy at the start of the war but after four years of occupation, it emerged in a poor state, although Belgium itself had suffered few deaths. The Germans had "brutally and efficiently stripped the country bare. Machinery, spare parts, whole factories including the roofs, had disappeared eastward. In 1919, 80 percent of its workforce was unemployed."

=== Military role ===
Belgian soldiers fought delaying actions in 1914 during the initial invasion. They succeeded in throwing the elaborate German invasion plan off schedule and helped sabotage the Schlieffen Plan that Berlin had counted on for a quick victory over France. At the Battle of Liège, the town's fortifications were able to hold off the invaders for over a week. The German "Race to the Sea" was held off by Belgian forces at the Battle of the Yser. King Albert I stayed in the Yser as commander of the military to lead the army while Broqueville's government withdrew to nearby Le Havre in France. Belgian units continued to serve on the front until 1918.

Forces from the Belgian Congo played a major role in the African Campaign and a small unit of Belgian soldiers served on the Eastern Front.

=== Occupation 1914–1918 ===
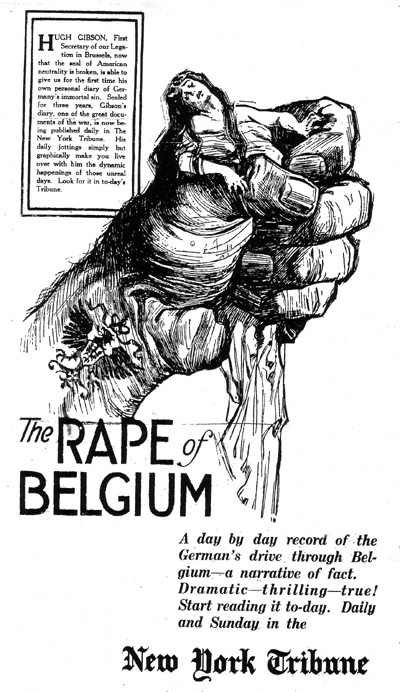
Cartoon of "The Rape of Belgium" showing giant hairy fist with Prussian eagle grasping maiden in flowing robes.

The Germans governed the occupied areas of Belgium through a General Governorate of Belgium, while a small area of the country remained unoccupied.

The whole country was ruled under martial law. On the advice of the government, civil servants remained in their posts for the duration.

The German army executed between 5,500 and 6,500 French and Belgian civilians between August and November 1914, usually in near-random large-scale shootings ordered by junior German officers. Individuals suspected of partisan activities were summarily shot. Several important Belgian figures, including politician Adolphe Max and historian Henri Pirenne, were deported to Germany.

The German occupying authorities viewed the Flemish as an oppressed people and had taken several Flemish-friendly measures, known as Flamenpolitik. This included introducing Dutch as the language of instruction of all state-supported schools in Flanders in 1918. This prompted a renewed Flemish movement in the years following the war. The Flemish Frontbeweging (Soldiers' Movement) was formed from Flemish soldiers in the Belgian army to campaign for greater use of Dutch language in education and government, though not separatist.

The Germans left Belgium stripped and barren. Over a 1.4 million refugees fled to France or to neutral Netherlands. After the systematic atrocities by the German army in the first few weeks of the war, German civil servants took control and were generally correct, albeit strict and severe. There was never a violent resistance movement, but there was a large-scale spontaneous passive resistance of refusal to work for the benefit of German victory. Belgium was heavily industrialized; while farms operated and small shops stayed open most large establishments shut down or drastically reduced their output. The faculty closed the universities; many publishers shut down their newspapers. In 1916 Germany shipped 120,000 men and boys to work in Germany; this set off a storm of protest from neutral countries and they were returned. Germany then stripped the factories of all useful machinery, and used the rest as scrap iron for its steel mills.

=== International relief ===
Belgium faced a food crisis, and an international response was organized by the American engineer Herbert Hoover. It was unprecedented in world history. Hoover's Commission for Relief in Belgium (CRB) had the permission of Germany and the Allies. As chairman of the CRB, Hoover worked with the leader of the Belgian Comité National de Secours et d'Alimentation (CNSA), Émile Francqui, to feed the entire nation for the duration of the war. The CRB imported millions of tons of foodstuffs for the CN to distribute, and watched over the CN to make sure the German army did not appropriate the food. The CRB became a veritable independent republic of relief, with its own flag, navy, factories, mills, and railroads. Private donations and government grants (78%) supplied an $11-million-a-month budget.

At its peak, the American arm, the ARA fed 10.5 million people daily. Britain grew reluctant to support the CRB, preferring instead to emphasize Germany's obligation to supply the relief; Winston Churchill led a military faction that considered the Belgian relief effort "a positive military disaster".

== Interwar period ==
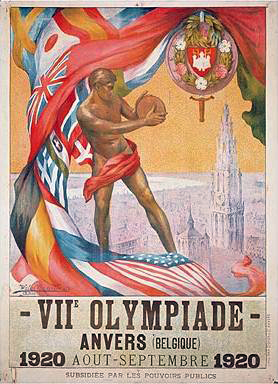
Poster for the 1920 Summer Olympics, held at Antwerp

King Albert returned as a war hero. In contrast, the government and the exiles came back discreetly. Belgium had been devastated—not so much by combat, but rather by German seizure of valuable machinery. Only 81 operable locomotives remained, out of the 3,470 available in 1914. 46 of 51 steel mills were damaged, with 26 destroyed totally. More than 100,000 houses had been destroyed, as well as more than 120,000 hectares (300,000 acres) of farmland.

Waves of popular violence accompanied liberation in November and December 1918 and the government responded through the judicial punishment of collaboration with the enemy conducted between 1919 and 1921. Shop windows were broken and houses sacked, men were harassed, and women's heads were shaved. Journalists who had boycotted and stopped writing called for harsh treatment of the newspapers that submitted to German censorship. Many people stigmatized profiteers and demanded justice. Thus in 1918, Belgium was already confronted with the problems associated with occupation that most European countries only discovered at the end of World War II.

However, despite the status quo, Belgium recovered surprisingly quickly. The first postwar Olympic Games were held in Antwerp in 1920. In 1921, Luxembourg formed a customs union with Belgium.

=== Reparations ===
German reparations to Belgium for damage incurred during the First World War was set at £12.5 billion pounds sterling. In 1919 under the Treaty of Versailles the area of Eupen-Malmedy, along with Moresnet was transferred to Belgium. "Neutral Moresnet" was transferred to Belgium, as well as the Vennbahn railway. An opportunity was given to the population to "oppose" against the transfer by signing a petition, which gathered few signatures, in large part thanks to intimidation by local authorities, and all regions remain part of Belgium today.

Belgian requests to annex territory considered as historically theirs from the Dutch, who were perceived as collaborators, was denied.

Between January 1923 and August 1925, Belgian and French soldiers were sent to the Ruhr in Germany to force the German government to agree to continue reparation payments. The Occupation of the Ruhr led to the Dawes Plan which allowed the German government more leniency in paying reparations.

The League of Nations in 1925 made Belgium the trustee for the former German East Africa which bordered the Belgian Congo to the east. It became Rwanda-Urundi (or "Ruanda-Urundi") (modern day Rwanda and Burundi). Although promising the League it would promote education, Belgium left the task to subsidised Catholic missions and unsubsidised Protestant missions. As late as 1962, fewer than 100 natives had gone beyond secondary school. The policy was one of low-cost paternalism, as explained by Belgium's special representative to the Trusteeship Council: "The real work is to change the African in his essence, to transform his soul, [and] to do that one must love him and enjoy having daily contact with him. He must be cured of his thoughtlessness, he must accustom himself to living in society, he must overcome his inertia."

=== Art and culture ===
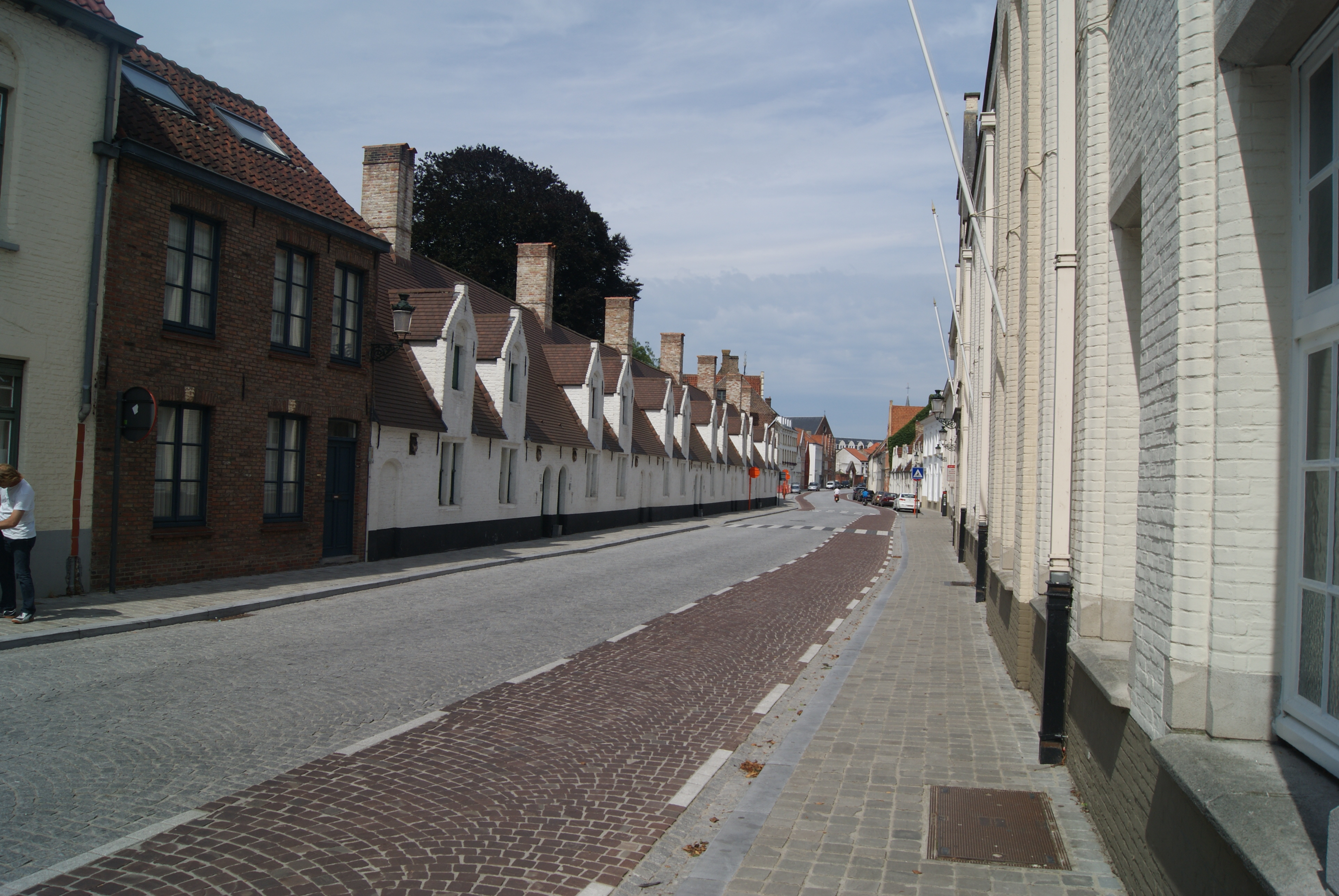
A historic street in Belgium

The Expressionism painting movement found a distinctive form in Flanders under artists like James Ensor, Constant Permeke and Léon Spilliaert. Belgian Surrealist art grew during the inter-war period, including works by René Magritte and Paul Delvaux.

Comic strips became extremely popular in Belgium during the 1930s. One of the most popular comics of the 20th century, Hergé's The Adventures of Tintin first appeared in 1929.

Belgian comics are a distinct subgroup in the comics history, and played a major role in the development of European comics, alongside France with whom they share a long common history. While the comics in the two major language groups and regions of Belgium (Flanders with the Dutch language and Wallonia with French) each have clearly distinct characteristics, they are constantly influencing one another, and meeting each other in Brussels and in the bilingual publication tradition of the major editors. As one of the few arts where Belgium has had an international and enduring impact in the 20th century, comics are known to be "an integral part of Belgian culture". Major contributors include Hergé with The Adventures of Tintin, Dupuis with Spirou, Willy Vandersteen with Suske en Wiske, Bessy, De Rode Ridder, Robert en Bertrand and many others, Marc Sleen with The Adventures of Nero, Peyo with The Smurfs, Jef Nys with Jommeke, and so many more.

Sales of comic books make up 14% of all book sales in Belgium's northern region of Flanders.

Belgium has played a major role in the development of the 9th art. In fact, even the designation of comics as the 9th Art is due to a Belgian. Morris introduced the term in 1964 when he started a series about the history of comics in Spirou. Belgium's comic-strip culture has been called by Time magazine "Europe's richest", while the Calgary Sun calls Belgium "the home of the comic strip". Belgium has several museums dedicated to comic books, comic book heroes and their authors.

The growth of comic strips was also accompanied by a popular art movement, exemplified by Edgar P. Jacobs, Jijé, Willy Vandersteen and André Franquin.

== World War II ==
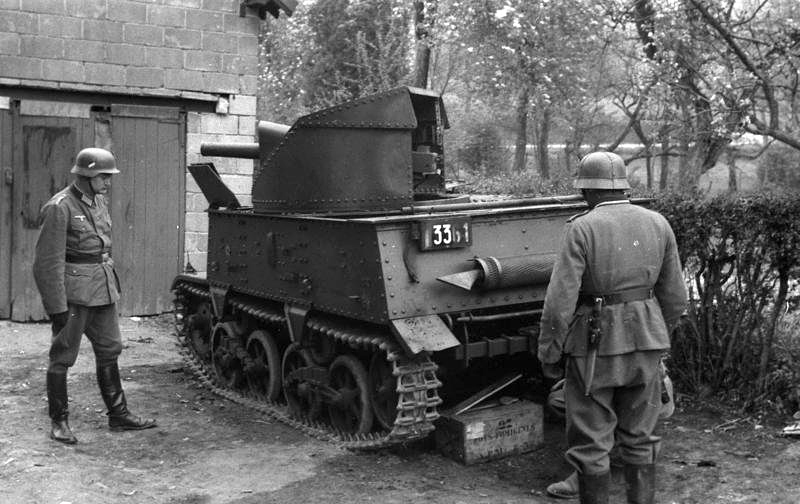
German soldiers examine an abandoned Belgian T13 Tank, 1940

Belgium tried to pursue a policy of unaligned neutrality before the war, but on May 10, 1940, the country was invaded by German forces. In the initial attacks, the fortifications which had been constructed to protect the borders like Fort Eben-Emael and the K-W Line were captured or bypassed by German forces. On May 28, after 18 days of fighting, Belgian forces (including the commander in chief, King Leopold III) surrendered. The elected government, under Hubert Pierlot, escaped to form a government in exile.

=== Belgian Army in the United Kingdom ===
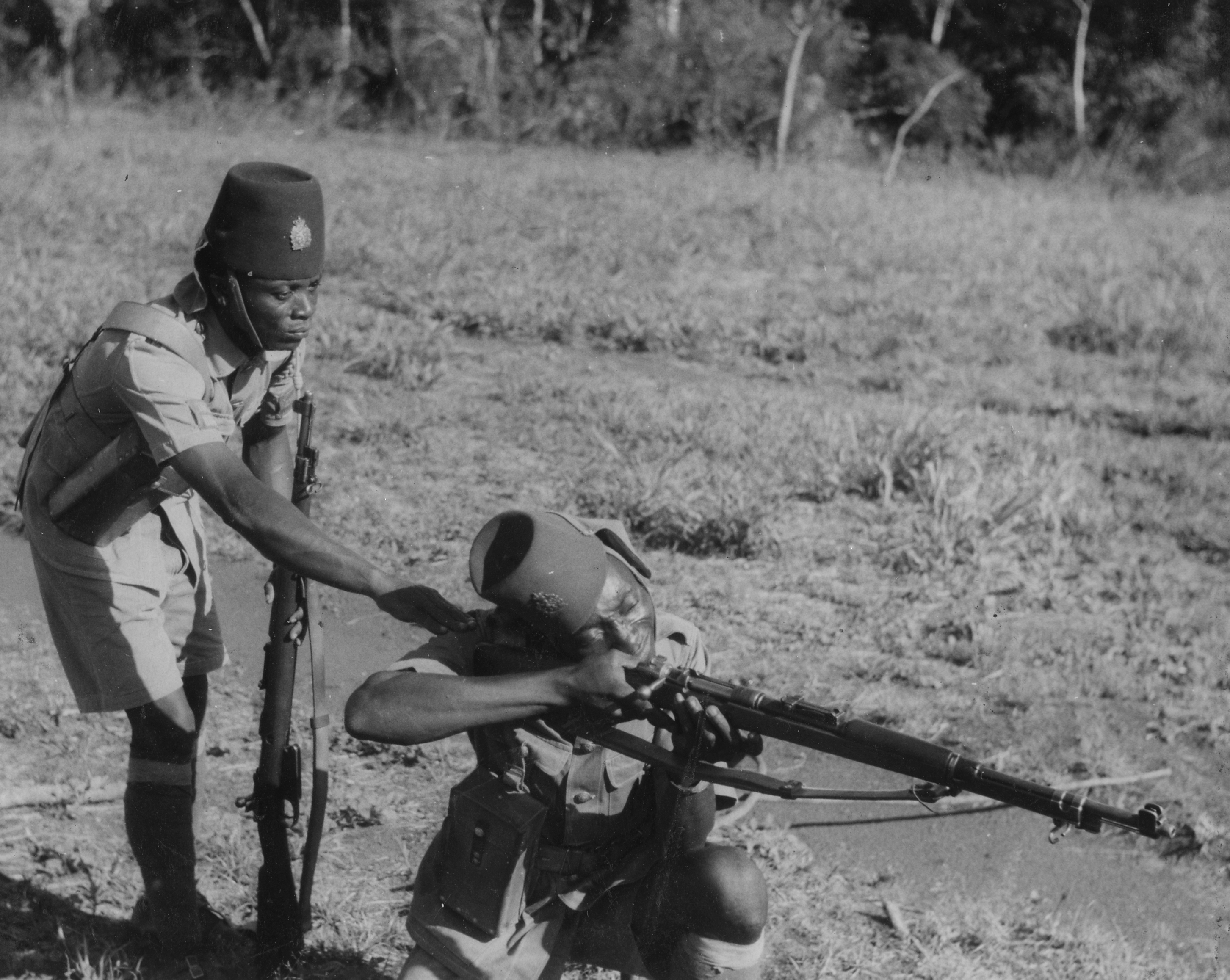
Two Force Publique soldiers in 1943

After the defeat in 1940, significant numbers of Belgian soldiers and civilians managed to escape to Britain to join the Belgian army in Exile. Belgian soldiers formed the 1st Belgian Infantry Brigade, which also included a battery of soldiers from Luxembourg, more often known as the Brigade Piron after its commanding officer, Jean-Baptiste Piron. The Brigade Piron was involved in the Normandy Invasion and the battles in France and the Netherlands until liberation. Belgians also served in British special forces units during the war, forming a troop of No.10 Commando which was heavily involved in the Italian Campaign and Landings on Walcheren. The 5th Special Air Service (SAS) was entirely made up of Belgians.

Two Belgian squadrons, amounting to over 400 pilots, served in the Royal Air Force during the war, both 349 and 350 Squadrons, which claimed over 50 'kills'. Two Corvettes and a group of Minesweepers were also operated by the Belgians during the Battle of the Atlantic, comprising some 350 men in 1943. Congolese soldiers of the Force Publique were involved in the East African Campaign, as well as in the Middle East and Burma. The Congo was also a vitally important economic asset to the allied powers, particularly through its exports of rubber and uranium; in fact the uranium used during the Manhattan Project – including that used for the atomic bombs dropped on Hiroshima and Nagasaki was supplied by the Belgian firm Union Minière du Haut Katanga from Katanga Province.

=== Occupation 1940–1944 ===
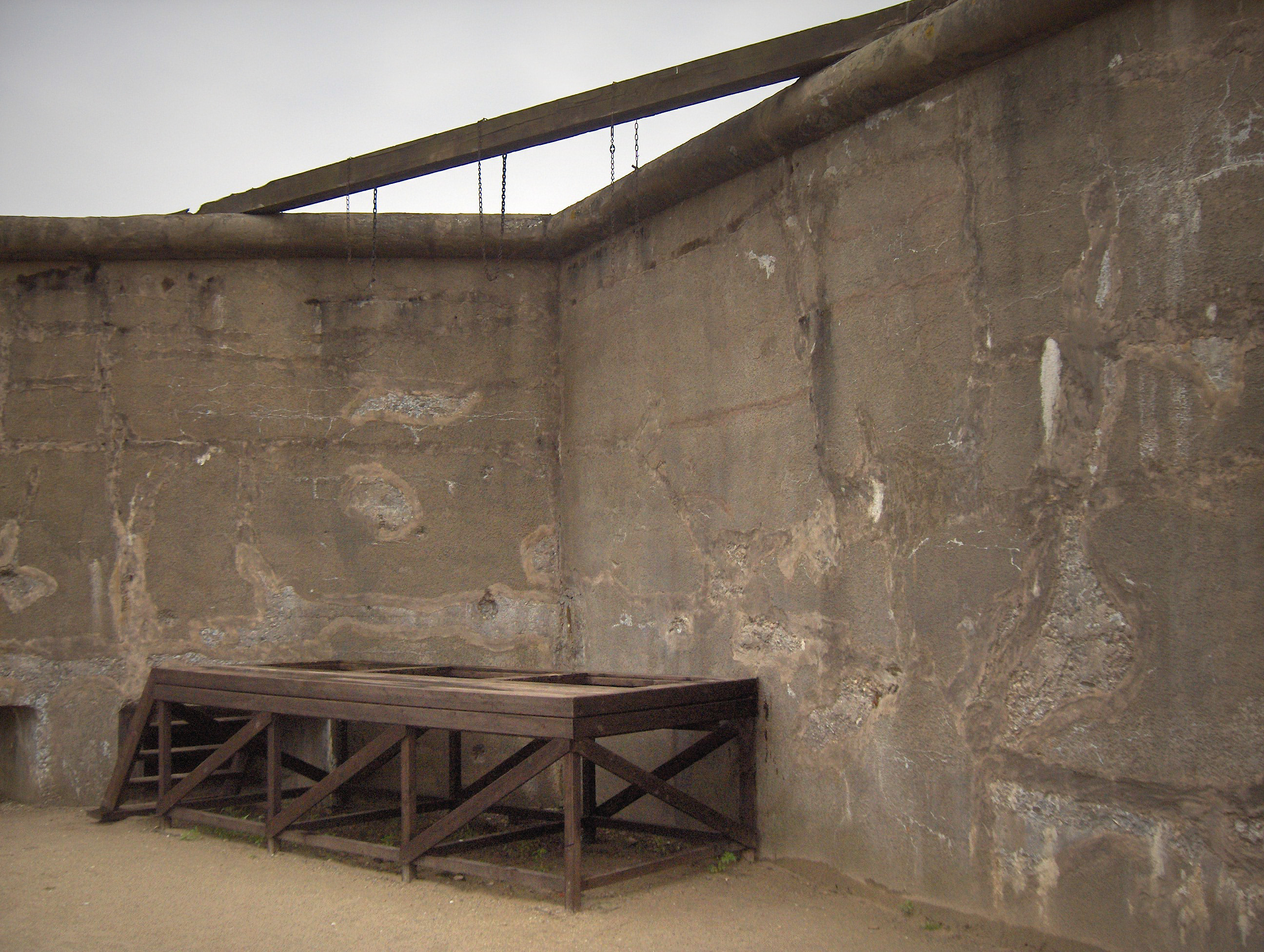
The gallows at Breendonk Concentration Camp, near Mechelen

Belgium was run by a Germany military government between its surrender and liberation in September 1944.

The former fort at Breendonk, near Mechelen was requisitioned by the Nazis and used for detainment and interrogation of Jews, political prisoners and captured members of the resistance. Of the 3,500 incarcerated in Breendonk between 1940 and 1944, 1,733 died. About 300 people were killed in the camp itself, with at least 98 dying from deprivation or torture.

In 1940, nearly 70,000 Jews were living in Belgium. Of these, 46 percent were deported from the Mechelen transit camp, while a further 5,034 people were deported via the Drancy internment camp. From the summer of 1942 until 1944, twenty-eight transports left Belgium carrying 25,257 Jews and 351 Roma to eastern Europe, often to Auschwitz. A total of 25,257 Jews were transported (including 5,093 children) and 352 Roma over the Mechelen-Leuven railway to concentration camps. Only 1,205 returned home alive.

=== Resistance ===
Resistance against the German occupiers can be seen at all levels, but was highly fragmented. Some organisations were very left-wing, like the Communist Front de l'Indépendance, but there was also a far-right resistance movement, the Légion Belge which comprised dissident Rexists, and other groups like Groupe G had no obvious political affiliation.

Resistance to the occupiers chiefly came in the form of helping allied airmen escape, and numerous lines were set up to organise this, for instance the Comet line which evacuated an estimated 14,000 allied airmen to Gibraltar. Sabotage was also used, and Group G's activities alone are estimated to have cost the Nazis 20 million man-hours of labor to repair damages. The resistance were also instrumental in saving Jews and Roma from deportation, for instance the attack on the Twentieth convoy. There was also significant low-level resistance, for instance in June 1941, the City Council of Brussels refused to distribute Stars of David badges. Many Belgians also hid Jews and political dissidents during the occupation, with one estimate putting the number at 20,000. (Note: The Kazerne Dossin Memorial, Museum and Documentation Centre (Museum van Deportatie en Verzet) puts the number at 20,000 Jews, including 3,000 children. Fogelman supplies a figure of 20,000 adults and 8,000 children in hiding.)

=== Collaboration ===
The flag of the francophone pro-Nazi Rexist party

During Nazi occupation, some Belgians collaborated with their occupiers. There were pro-Nazi political organizations in both Flemish and Walloon communities before and during the war. The most significant were the Flemish DeVlag and Vlaamsch Nationaal Verbond (VNV) as well as the Catholic Walloon Rexist movement. These organisations were also fundamental to encouraging Belgians to enlist in the German army. Two divisions of the Waffen SS, the Flemish 27th SS "Langemarck" Division and the Walloon 28th SS "Wallonien" Division. Some organisations, like Verdinaso appealed directly to Flemish separatist ideologies, though they did not become very popular.

After the war, many of those who had collaborated – including many of the guards at Fort Breendonk – were tried, imprisoned or shot.

=== Allied liberation 1944–1945 ===
Belgium was liberated late in 1944 by Allied forces. On 3 September 1944 the Welsh Guards liberated Brussels. The British Second Army seized Antwerp on 4 of September 1944, and the First Canadian Army began conducting combat operations around the port that same month. Antwerp became a highly prized and heavily fought-over objective because its deep-water port was necessary to keep the Allied armies supplied. The Battle of the Scheldt in October 1944 was fought primarily on Dutch soil, but with the objective of opening the way for boats to Antwerp. The port city was also the ultimate objective of German armies during the Ardennes Offensive which resulted in heavy fighting on Belgian soil during the winter of 1944–1945.

Following liberation, 10,000 Belgians who had remained in the country during the occupation were mobilised into the Belgian army in 57 "Fusilier Battalions".

== WWII to present ==
=== "Royal Question" ===
Immediately after the war, Léopold III, who had surrendered to the German army in 1940, was released; however, the issue of whether he had betrayed his country by surrendering, while most government ministers had escaped to the United Kingdom, presented a constitutional dilemma. The Belgian public was concerned that he might be a collaborator with the Nazis. He had met Hitler in Berchtesgaden on November 19, 1940, and had even remarried (to Lilian Baels) during the war. Many Belgians, especially the Socialists, strongly opposed his return to power. He was kept in exile in Switzerland until 1950, while his brother Prince Charles presided as regent.

A 1950 referendum produced a very close result. In Flanders, the electorate voted 70% in favour of his return but Wallonia voted 58% against. Brussels also returned a 51% "No" vote. Although the referendum narrowly produced a favourable result for Léopold (about 57.68% in the country as a whole), the militant socialist movement in Liège, Hainaut and other urban centres incited major protests and even called a General Strike against his return. Léopold III abdicated on July 16, 1951, in favour of his son Baudouin.

=== Occupation of Germany, Korean War and EDC ===
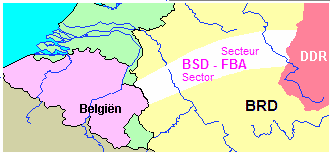
Map showing the area of West Germany occupied by Belgian forces after the Second World War, known as FBA-BSD

Belgian soldiers were assigned to occupy a section of West Germany, known as Belgian Forces in Germany or FBA-BSD. The last Belgian soldiers left Germany in 2002.

In 1950, a unit of volunteers from the Belgian army was sent to fight for the United Nations in the Korean War. The Belgian United Nations Command (or BUNC) arrived in Korea in early 1951, and fought at several key engagements of the conflict, including at the Battle of the Imjin River, Haktang-ni and Chatkol. Over 300 Belgians were killed in action. The last Belgian soldiers returned from Korea in 1955.

=== Benelux and Europe ===
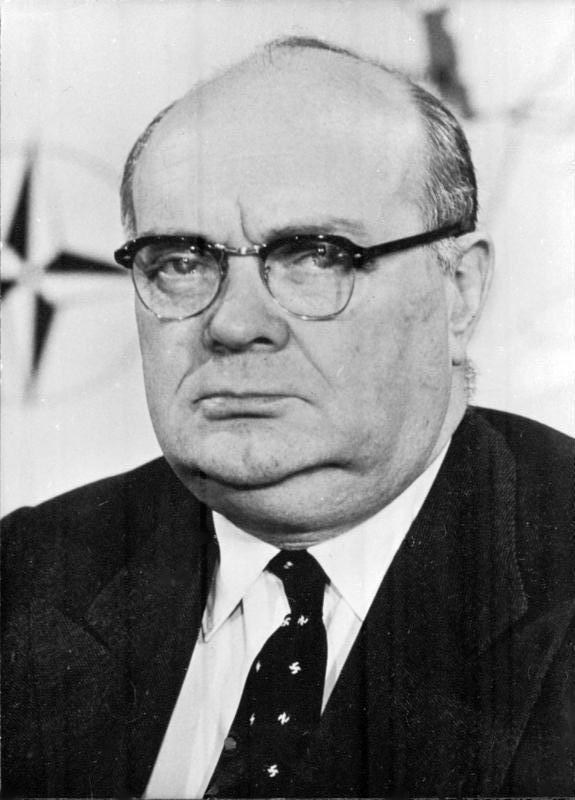
Paul-Henri Spaak, three-times Prime Minister and author of the Spaak Report, was a staunch believer in international bodies, including the ECSC and EEC

On September 5, 1944, the Benelux Customs Union was created. It entered into force in 1948, and ceased to exist on 1 November 1960, when it was replaced by the Benelux Economic Union after a treaty signed in The Hague on February 3, 1958. The Benelux Parliament was created in 1955.

The Treaty of Brussels, signed on 17 March 1948 by Belgium, the Netherlands, Luxembourg, France, and the United Kingdom, is considered the precursor to the NATO agreement, which Belgium became an official member of on April 4, 1949. The headquarters of NATO are located in Brussels, and the headquarters of SHAPE near Mons.

Belgium was also one of the original founding members of the European Coal and Steel Community (ECSC) in July 1952 and of the European Economic Community formed by the Treaty of Rome on March 25, 1957. Belgium has been a member of the Schengen area since 1985.

=== Belgian "Economic Miracle" ===
==== Marshall Plan ====
The American Marshall Plan gave Belgium $559 million in grants from 1948 to 1951. A central goal of the ERP was to promote the growth of productivity along the lines of American management and labor practices. The interest among some Belgian employers in increasing rates of productivity per worker was motivated by the rise in wage levels. But the Americans also intended to inject a new "spirit of productivity" in Belgian industries, which implied, among other measures, a reinforcement of structures of corporatist negotiation. After the belated establishment of the Belgian Office for the Increase of Productivity in 1952, the political character of the program became apparent. The "policy of productivity" was successful for a time because it matched the evolution of social reforms. This policy success, however, was rendered impotent by the failure of the economic dimension of the productivity campaigns. The Americans had in effect failed to recognize the structural importance of the major financial groups which dominated heavy industry in Belgium. By not carrying out any large-scale programs of innovation and investment in the key sectors that they controlled in the aftermath of the war, these holding companies greatly restricted the scope for American influence. Consequently, it was by other means, such as the training of managers, that American paradigms entered Belgian economic culture.

==== Growth and poverty ====
After the war, the government cancelled Belgium's debts. It was during this period that the well-known Belgian highways were built. In addition, both the economy and the average standard of living rose significantly. As noted by Robert Gildea, "Social and economic policy was designed to restore liberal capitalism tempered by social reform, as prepared for during the war. Trade unions were also involved in a price and wage policy to cut inflation and this, together with the Allied use of Antwerp as the main entry point for war supplies, produced the so-called Belgian miracle of high economic growth combined with high wages." According to one study, Belgian workers by 1961 earned wages "second only to those of the French in the Common Market area", and earned 40% more than their Dutch counterparts. The rising prosperity of the post-war years was demonstrated by the growth in household possession of a number of different consumer goods. In 1977, for example, 69.3% of households had a car, 75% a washing machine, 87% a vacuum cleaner, 79% a food processor, 92% a television, 51% a cassette recorder, 86% a transistor radio, and 72% a still camera, while in 1976 12% of households had a radio recorder, 60% a tape recorder, and 38% a record player.

Despite post-war affluence, however, many Belgians continued to live in poverty. An organisation of several poverty action groups, known as the National Action for Security of Subsistence, claimed that more than 900,000 Belgians (about 10% of the population) lived in poverty in 1967, while in the early 1970s, a group of social scientists called the Working Group on Alternative Economics estimated that about 14.5% of the Belgian population lived in poverty.

Because Flanders had been widely devastated during the war and had been largely agricultural since the Belgian uprising, it benefited most from the Marshall Plan. Its standing as an economically backward agricultural region meant that it obtained support from Belgium's membership of the European Union and its predecessors. At the same time, Wallonia experienced a slow relative decline as the products of its mines and mills came to be less in demand. The economic balance between the two parts of the country has remained less in favour of Wallonia than it was before 1939.

=== Second "School War" 1950–1959 ===
After victory in the 1950 elections, a Christian Social Party (PSC-CVP) government came to power. The new education minister, Pierre Harmel, increased the wages of teachers in private (Catholic) schools and introduced laws linking the subsidies for private schools to the number of pupils. These measures were perceived by the anti-clerical Liberals and Socialists as a "declaration of war".

When the 1954 elections brought to power a coalition of Socialists and Liberals, the new Education Minister, Leo Collard, immediately set out to reverse the measures taken by his predecessor, founding a large number of secular schools and only permitting teachers with a diploma, forcing many priests out of the profession. These measures sparked mass protests from the Catholic bloc. A compromise was eventually found by the next government (a Catholic minority led by Gaston Eyskens), and the "Schools War" was concluded by the November 6, 1958 "School Pact".

=== Congolese independence and the Congo Crisis ===
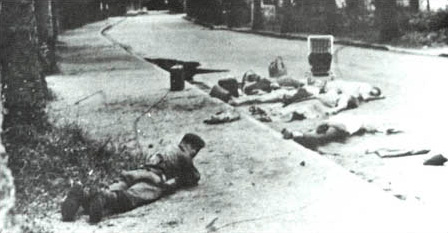
Belgian soldier taking cover by the corpses of dead hostages, November 1964 in Stanleyville during Operation Dragon Rouge

After riots in the Congo in 1959, the scheduled gradual transition to independence was sped up dramatically. In June 1960, the Belgian Congo was replaced by the short-lived First Republic of Congo, led by the democratically elected Congolese statesman Patrice Lumumba. Belgian forces withdrew, leaving the military Force Publique under Congo's control. Order broke down as mutinying soldiers attacked whites who remained in the country. Belgians forces were briefly sent to evacuate Belgian nationals and army officers.

In July 1960, the southern state of Katanga Province declared its independence, forming the State of Katanga. Katanga's bid for sovereignty was supported by Belgian mining companies and soldiers, who had considerable assets in the area. Later that month, United Nations peacekeepers were deployed to the country. During this period of anarchy, the region of South Kasai also declared independence. Western powers including Belgium supported Joseph Mobutu, who installed a right-wing regime in the Congo. Lumumba was murdered and civil war ensued. Belgian paratroopers were again deployed, this time to rescue civilian hostages captured in Stanleyville during an operation known as Dragon Rouge. At the end Mobutu emerged as the ruler of the re-unified country, which he named Zaire.

=== General Strike of 1960–61 ===
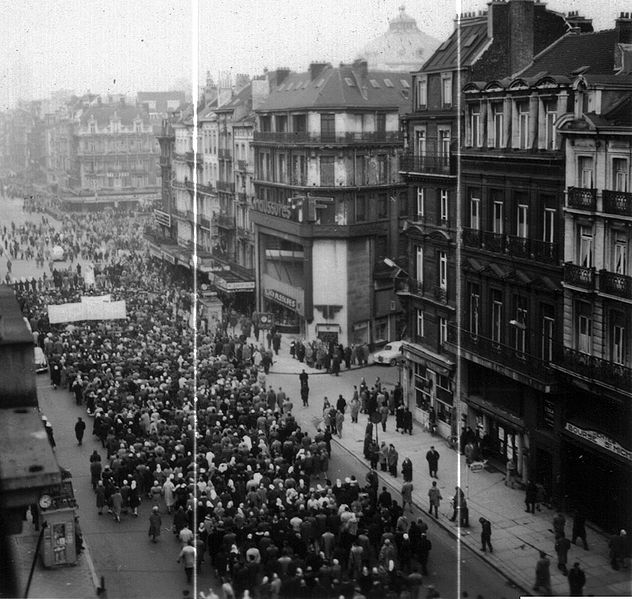
Walloon workers demonstration in Brussels in the winter of 1960

In December 1960, Wallonia was gripped by a general strike in response to the general decline of Wallonian manufacturing in a period of turbulence in the aftermath of the Second Schools War. The Wallonian workers demanded federalism, in addition to structural reforms. Even though the strike had been intended to be nationwide, Flemish workers appeared reluctant to support it.

The Strike was led by André Renard, the founder of "Renardism" which combined militant socialism with Walloon nationalism. The historian Renée Fox described Wallonia's alienation:

At the beginning of the 1960s (...), a major reversal in the relationship between Flanders and Wallonia was taking place. Flanders had entered a vigorous, post–World War II period of industrialization, and a significant percentage of the foreign capital (particularly from the United States, coming into Belgium to support new industries, was being invested in Flanders. In contrast, Wallonia's coal mines and time-worn steel plants and factories were in crisis. The region had lost thousands of jobs and much investment capital. A new Dutch-speaking, upwardly mobile "populist bourgeoisie" was not only becoming visible and vocal in Flemish movements but also in both the local and national policy... [The strike of December 1960 against the austerity law of Gaston Eyskens ] was replaced by a collective expression of the frustrations, anxieties, and grievances that Wallonia was experiencing in response to its altered situation, and by the demands of the newly formed Walloon Popular Movement for...regional autonomy for Wallonia...

Nationwide the economy was generally healthy with an annual growth rate of 5% in the 1960s. However old inefficient factories were being shut down in textiles and leather goods. Coal miners were angered by the closure of used-up mines. Limburg miners at the Zwartberg mine rioted in 1966 to protest its closure. Two miners were killed by police and ten were injured, while nineteen policemen were hurt. In 1973 a series of worldwide crises adversely affected the Belgian economy.

=== "Linguistic Wars" ===
This Flemish resurgence has been accompanied by a corresponding shift of political power to the Flemish, who constituted the majority of the population of around 60%. An official Dutch translation of the constitution was only accepted in 1967.

The linguistic wars reached a climax in 1968 with the splitting of the Catholic University of Leuven along linguistic lines into the Katholieke Universiteit Leuven and Université Catholique de Louvain. The government of Paul Vanden Boeynants fell over the issue in 1968.

=== Rise of the federal state ===
The flag of Flanders incorporating the Flemish lion, also used by the Flemish Movement.

The successive linguistic disputes made the successive Belgian governments very unstable. The three major parties all split in two according to their French- or Dutch-speaking electorate. A language border was determined by the first Gilson Act of November 8, 1962. The boundaries of certain provinces, arrondissements and municipalities were modified and facilities for linguistic minorities were introduced in 25 municipalities. On August 2, 1963, the second Gilson Act entered into force, fixing the division of Belgium into four language areas: a Dutch, a French and a German language area, with Brussels as a bilingual area.

In 1970, there was a first state reform, which resulted in the establishment of three cultural communities: Dutch, French and German. This reform was a response to the Flemish demand for cultural autonomy. The constitutional revision of 1970 also laid the foundations for the establishment of three Regions, which was a response to the demand of the Walloons and the French-speaking inhabitants of Brussels for economic autonomy. On February 18, 1970, Prime Minister Gaston Eyskens announced the end of "La Belgique de papa".

The second state reform took place in 1980, when the cultural communities became Communities. The Communities assumed the competencies of the cultural communities with regard to cultural matters, and became responsible for the 'matters relating to the person', such as health and youth policy. From then on, these three Communities were known as the Flemish Community, the French Community and the German-speaking Community. Two Regions were established as well in 1980: the Flemish Region and the Walloon Region. However, in Flanders it was decided in 1980 to immediately merge the institutions of the Community and the Region. Although the creation of a Brussels Region was provided for in 1970, the Brussels-Capital Region was not established until the third state reform.

During the third state reform in 1988 and 1989, under Prime Minister Wilfried Martens, the Brussels-Capital Region was established with its own regional institutions, as well as Dutch and French institutions for community matters. The Brussels-Capital Region remained limited to 19 municipalities. Other changes included that the competencies of the Communities and Regions were expanded. One notable responsibility that was transferred to the Communities during the third state reform was education.

Map showing the division of Brabant into Flemish Brabant (yellow), Walloon Brabant (red) and the Brussels-Capital Region (orange) in 1995

The fourth state reform, which took place in 1993 under Prime Minister Jean-Luc Dehaene, consolidated the previous state reforms and turned Belgium into a fully-fledged federal state. The first article of the Belgian Constitution was amended to read, "Belgium is a Federal State which consists of Communities and Regions". During the fourth state reform, the responsibilities of the Communities and the Regions were expanded, their resources were increased and they were given more fiscal responsibilities. Other major changes included the direct election of the parliaments of the Communities and the Regions, the splitting up of the Province of Brabant into Flemish Brabant and Walloon Brabant, and the reformation of the Federal Parliament's bicameral system and the relations between the Federal Parliament and the Federal Government. The first direct elections for the parliaments of the Communities and the Regions took place on May 21, 1995.

In 2001, a fifth state reform took place, under Prime Minister Guy Verhofstadt, with the Lambermont and the Lombard Accords. More powers were transferred to the Communities and the Regions, with regard to agriculture, fisheries, foreign trade, development cooperation, auditing of electoral expenses and the supplementary financing of the political parties. The Regions became responsible for twelve regional taxes, and local and provincial government became a matter for the Regions. The first municipal and provincial elections under the supervision of the Regions were in 2006. The functioning of the Brussels institutions was also amended during the fifth state reform, which resulted among other things in a guaranteed representation of the Flemish inhabitants in the Parliament of the Brussels-Capital Region.

At the end of 2011, following the longest political crisis in Belgium's contemporary history, a constitutional accord between the four main political families (socialists, liberals, social-Christians, ecologists), but excluding the Flemish nationalists, ushered in the sixth state reform which provided for major institutional changes and additional transfers of competences from the federal level to the Communities and the Regions. Among other changes, the Senate ceased to be directly elected to become an assembly of regional parliaments, the Brussels-Capital Region was granted constitutive autonomy, and the Regions received economic, employment and family welfare competences as well as greater fiscal autonomy.

Belgium was one of the founders of the European Common Market. Between 1999 and 2002, the Euro gradually replaced the Belgian franc (the currency of Belgium since 1830) at the rate of 1 EUR=40.3399 BEF Belgian Euro coins usually depict King Albert II on the obverse.

=== Political parties ===
From the 1960s, most political parties, which had previously stood in elections in both Flemish and Walloon areas, split down linguistic divides. The Catholic party split in 1968 while the Belgian Socialist Party split in 1978 into the French-speaking Parti Socialiste and Flemish Socialistische Partij. The Liberals also split on regional lines in 1992.

"Green" politics in Belgium became quite successful in the aftermath of the Marc Dutroux Scandal and the "Dioxin Affair".

=== Marc Dutroux scandal ===
In 1996, confidence in the political and criminal justice systems was shaken by the news that Marc Dutroux and his accomplices had kidnapped, tortured, and murdered young girls. Parliamentary inquiries found the police forces were incompetent and bureaucratic, and the judicial system suffered from bureaucracy, very poor communication with, and support for, the victims, slow procedures and many loopholes for criminals. On October 26, 1996, about 300,000 Belgians joined the "White March" in Brussels in protest.

=== Belgian military intervention since 1990 ===
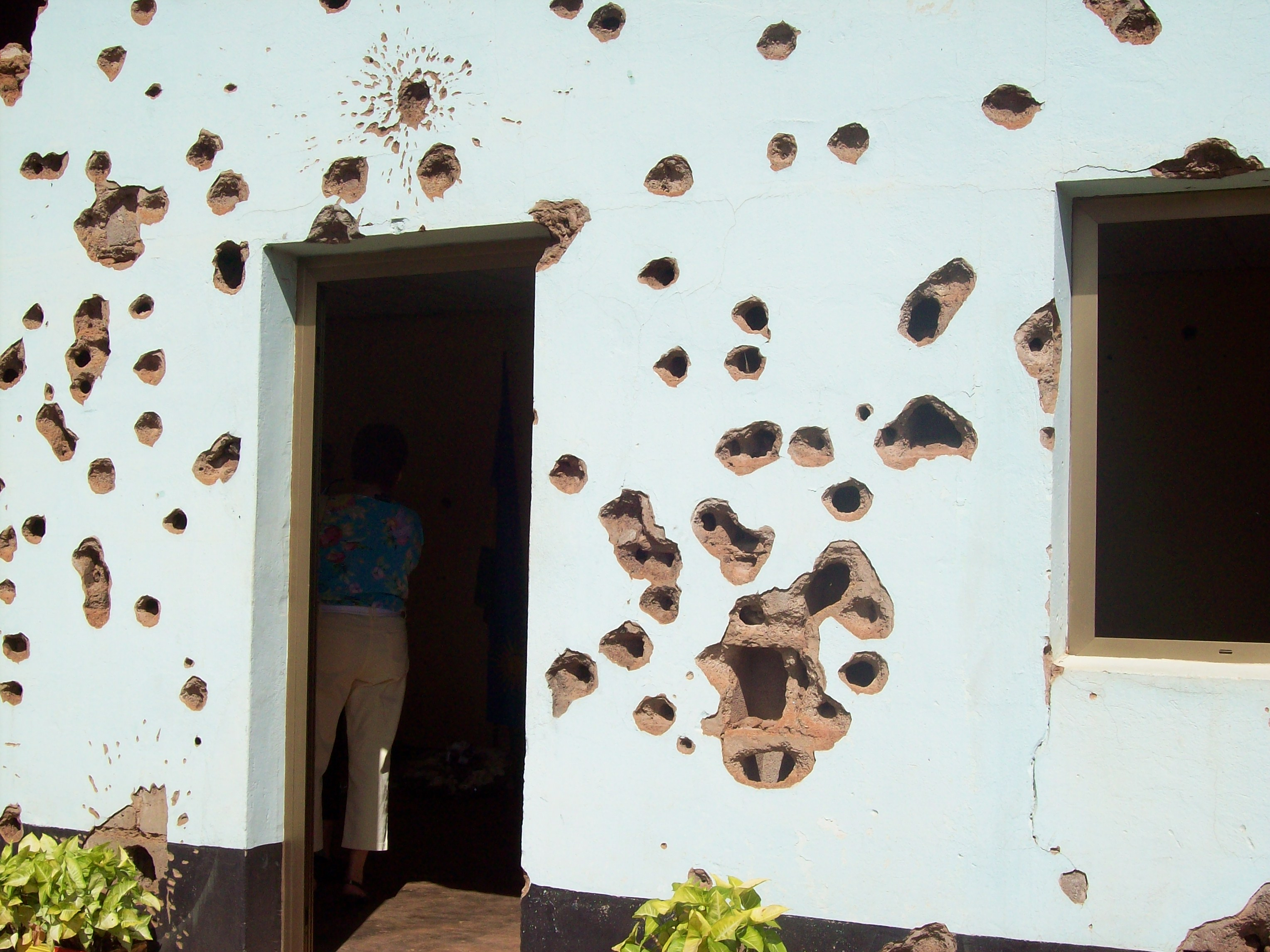
Site of the massacre of Belgian UN personnel in Kigali, Rwanda.

The United Nations mission in Rwanda during the Rwandan Civil War, known as UNAMIR, involved a significant Belgian contingent under the command of Roméo Dallaire. Belgium, as the former colonial power in the country, sent the largest force of around 400 soldiers from the 2nd Commando Battalion.

After the downing of the Rwandan and Burundian presidential plane 10 Belgian peacekeepers were murdered by the Hutu-dominated government army. In response, Belgium withdrew all of its peacekeepers, blaming UNAMIR for failing to rescue their men. The Belgians had represented the largest and most capable element in the UNAMIR mission, leaving it incapacitated and unable to cope with the events of the Rwandan genocide.

Belgian paratroopers were deployed to Somalia during Operation Restore Hope as part of UNOSOM tasked with securing aid deliveries and peacekeeping. Several Belgian soldiers were killed during the deployment.

During the Kosovo crisis of 1999, 600 Belgian paratroopers participated in Operation Allied Harbour, a NATO operation to protect and provide assistance to the huge number of ethnic Albanian refugees in Albania and Macedonia. That same year, 1,100 Belgian soldiers participated in the Kosovo Force (KFOR), a NATO-led peacekeeping force.

Belgian soldiers have served in Lebanon, under the United Nations Interim Force in Lebanon (UNIFIL). Approximately 394 Belgians have served in Lebanon, in demining and medical operations, and a frigate is also present.

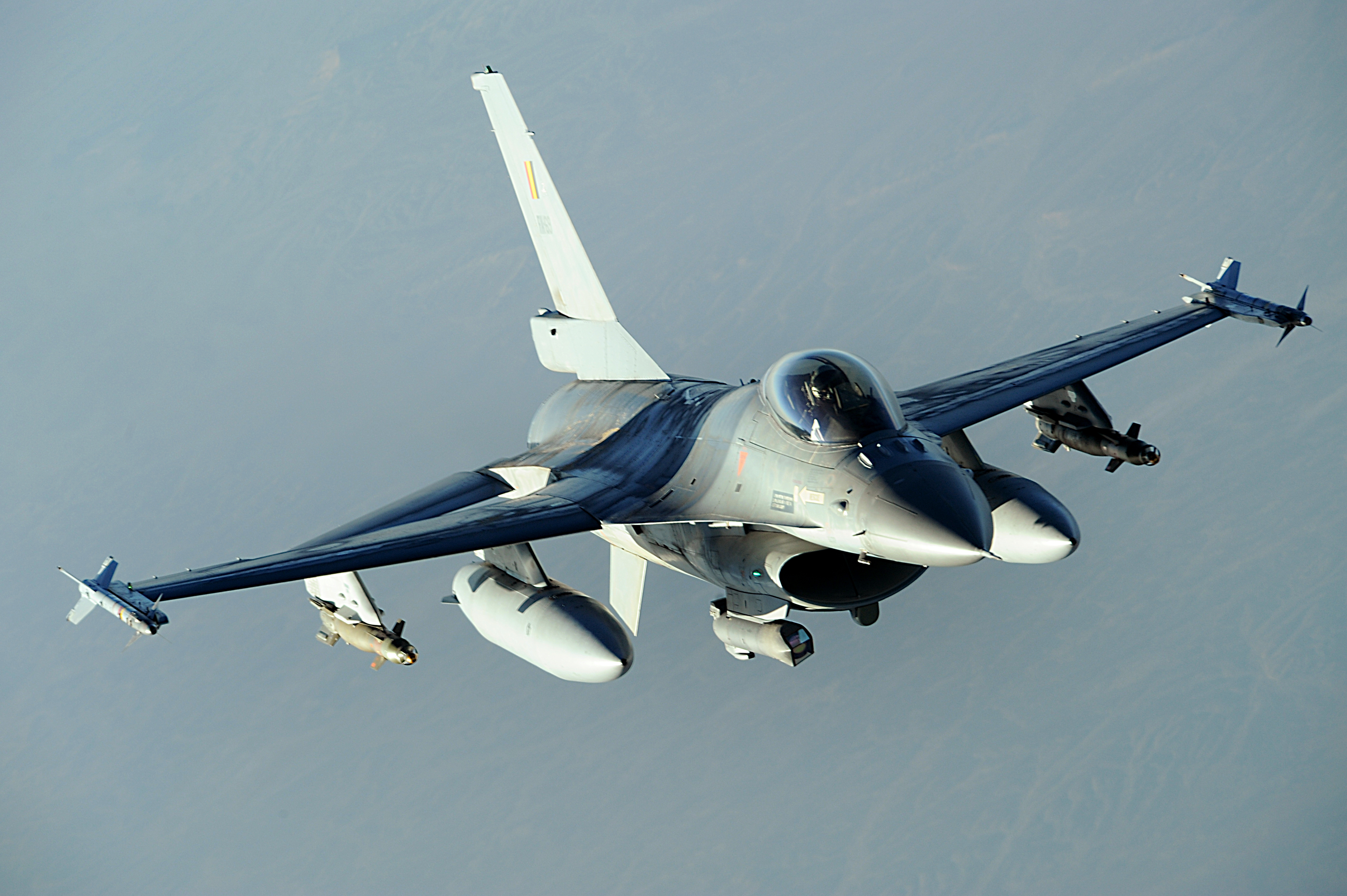
Belgian F-16 conducts a combat patrol over Afghanistan, 2008

In the 2011, the Belgian Air Force deployed six fighter jets in support of the NATO intervention in the Libyan Civil War in accordance with United Nations Security Council Resolution 1973. Belgian aircraft were involved in airstrikes on pro-Ghadaffi forces.

Belgium was part of the ISAF mission in Afghanistan, joint with soldiers from Luxembourg. The main objective was providing security at Kabul International Airport, while detachments assisted in the northern PRTs of Kunduz and Mazar-i-Sharif. In September 2008, four F‑16 jets with about 140 support personnel were deployed.

=== Debt and economic slowdown ===
Belgium created huge debts during times when rates were low and generated new debts to service the initial debt. Its debts amounted to about 130% of the GDP in 1992 and were decreased to about 108,2% in 2001. This drastic economic policy resulted in deep budget spending cuts, such as cuts to scientific research.

=== Internal politics ===
In the 1999 Belgian federal election, the traditional government parties suffered a significant defeat due to the so-called "Dioxin Affair", leading to the fall of Jean-Luc Dehaene's government after eight years in office. Guy Verhofstadt formed a government of Liberals, Socialists and Greens.

In July 1999, a government of Greens and Flemish Liberals and Democrats announced a gradual phase-out of Belgium's seven nuclear reactors after 40 years of operation. Though it was speculated that the next government without Greens would immediately revoke this legislation. after the 2003 elections there was still no sign of a policy reversal, particularly in the aftermath of the incident at Tihange reactor in 2002.

The Belgian government was strongly opposed to the Iraq War during the Iraq crisis of 2003. The Verhofstadt government proposed a diplomatic solution regarding WMD.

On January 30, 2003, Belgium became the second country in the world to legally recognize same-sex marriage. A 2005 proposal allowed adoption by same-sex partners.

=== Political crisis 2010–11 ===
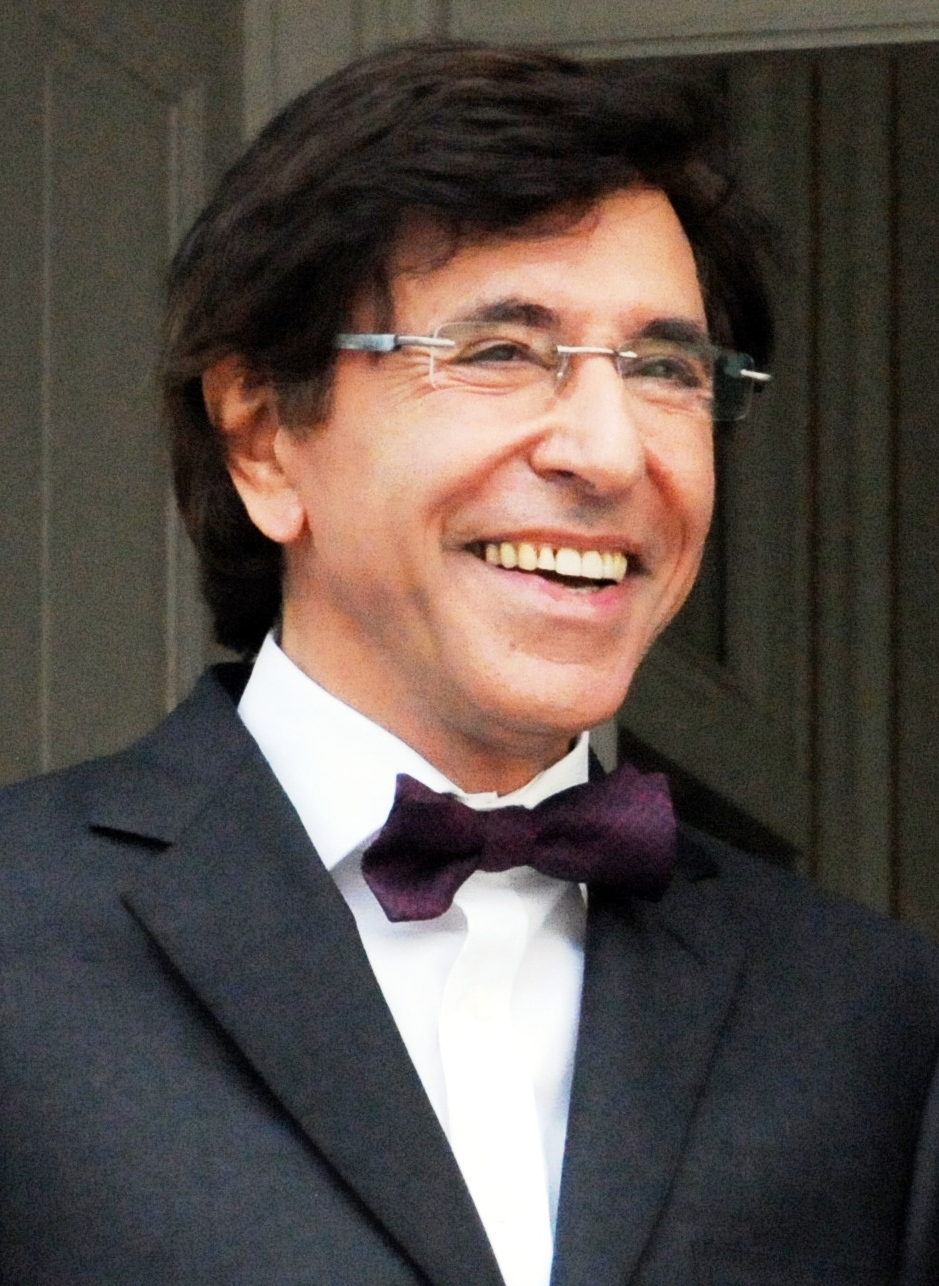
Elio Di Rupo, the Prime Minister of Belgium from 2011 until 2014

The 2010 Belgian federal election produced a highly fragmented political landscape, with 11 parties elected to the Chamber of Representatives, none of which had more than 20% of the seats. The separatist New Flemish Alliance (N-VA), the largest party in Flanders and the country as a whole, controlled 27 of 150 seats in the lower chamber. Belgium beat the world record for time taken to form a new democratic government after an election, at 353 days. Finally a government coalition was sworn in on 6 December 2011, with Socialist Elio Di Rupo becoming prime minister.

=== 2014–present ===
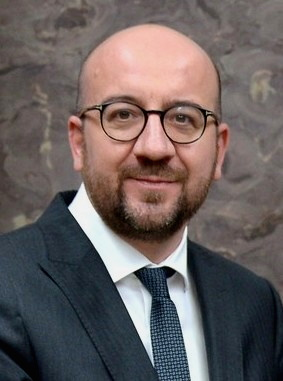
Charles Michel, the Prime Minister of Belgium from 2014 until 2019

The 2014 election resulted in a further electoral gain for the Flemish nationalist N-VA, although the incumbent coalition maintained a solid majority. On 22 July 2014, King Philippe nominated Charles Michel (MR) and Kris Peeters (CD&V) to lead the formation of a new coalition federal cabinet.

In July 2019 prime minister Charles Michel was selected as President of the European Council. His successor Sophie Wilmès was Belgium's first female prime minister. Alexander De Croo became prime minister in October 2020. On 9 June 2024, federal elections were held in Belgium on the same day as the regional and European elections. Prime Minister Alexander De Croo resigned after the heavy defeat of his party, the Open Flemish Liberals and Democrats, in federal and regional elections.

On 3 February 2025, Bart De Wever, leader of the New Flemish Alliance, became the new prime minister. He is the first Flemish nationalist to be named Belgian premier.

== See also ==
- BELvue Museum – a Brussels museum tracing the history of Belgium from 1830 until the present.
- History of Flanders
- History of the Jews in Belgium
- History of Wallonia
- List of Belgian monarchs
  - Family tree of Belgian monarchs
- List of World Heritage Sites in Belgium
- Politics of Belgium
  - Politics of Flanders
  - Politics of Wallonia
- Timeline of Belgian history

== Bibliography ==
=== Reference and surveys ===
- Arblaster, Paul. A History of the Low Countries. (2006). 298 pp. online
- Blom, J. C. H. and E. Lamberts, eds. History of the Low Countries (2006) excerpt and text search
- Cammaerts, Émile. A History of Belgium from the Roman Invasion to the Present Day (1921) 357 pages; complete text online
- Goris, Jan-Albert, ed. Belgium (1945); a broad survey of history and culture online
- Humes, Samuel. Belgium: Long United, Long Divided (2014) comprehensive scholarly history; 330 pp
- Israel, Jonathan. The Dutch Republic: Its Rise, Greatness, and Fall, 1477–1806 (1995) contain a great deal on Belgium; excerpt and text search
- Kossmann, E.H. (1978). The Low Countries: 1780–1940. Oxford University Press. ISBN 978-0-1982-2108-1. OL 12384667W.
- Milward, Alan S. and S. B. Saul. The Development of the Economies of Continental Europe: 1850–1914 (1977) pp. 142–214
- Milward, Alan S. and S. B. Saul. The Economic Development of Continental Europe 1780–1870 (2nd ed. 1979)
- Omond, George W. T. Belgium. London: A. & C. Black (1908), Colour Books series, illustrated by Amédée Forestier
- Pirenne, H. Histoire de Belgique vol2 (1903) online; full text of vol 3 (1907)online; vol 5 (1920) online
- Stallaerts, Robert. The A to Z of Belgium (2010), a historical encyclopedia
- State, Paul F. (2004). Historical Dictionary of Brussels. Scarecrow Press. ISBN 978-0-8108-6555-6.
- Witte, Els; Craeybeckx, Jan; Meynen, Alain (2009). Political History of Belgium: From 1830 Onwards. ASP (Academic & Scientific Publishers) / Vubpress / Upa. ISBN 978-9-0548-7517-8.

=== Political history ===
- Ascherson, Neal (1999). The King incorporated: Leopold the Second and the Congo (New ed.). London: Granta. ISBN 978-1-8620-7290-9.
- Carlier, Julie. "Forgotten Transnational Connections and National Contexts: an 'entangled history' of the political transfers that shaped Belgian feminism, 1890–1914", Women's History Review (2010) 19#4 pp. 503–522.
- Conway, Martin. The Sorrows of Belgium: Liberation and Political Reconstruction, 1944–1947 (Oxford University Press, 2012). online review
- Cook, Bernard A. (2004). Belgium : a history. New York: Peter Lang. ISBN 978-0-8204-5824-3.
- Deprez, Kas; Vos, Louis, eds. (1998). Nationalism in Belgium: Shifting Identities, 1780–1995.
- Fishman, J. S. Diplomacy and Revolution. The London Conference of 1830 and the Belgian Revolt (Amsterdam 1988).
- Lorwin, Val R. "Belgium: Religion, class and language in national politics", in Robert Dahl, ed. Political Oppositions in Western Democracies (1966) pp. 147–187.
- Mansel, Philip. "Nation Building: the Foundation of Belgium." History Today 2006 56(5): 21–27.
- Pirenne, Henri. Early democracies in the Low Countries; urban society and political conflict in the Middle Ages and the Renaissance (1963) online
- Pirenne, Henri. Belgian Democracy Its Early History (1915) online
- Pirenne, Henri. "The Formation and Constitution of the Burgundian State (Fifteenth and Sixteenth Centuries)." The American Historical Review. 14#32 p 477+, April 1909 in JSTOR
- Polansky, Janet L. Revolution in Brussels 1787–1793 (1987)
- Strikwerda, C. J. Mass Politics and the Origin of Pluralism: Catholicism, Socialism and Flemish Nationalism in Nineteenth-Century Belgium (Lanham, MD and Leuven, 1997)
- Strikwerda, C. J. Urban Structure, Religion and Language: Belgian Workers (1880–1914) (Ann Arbor, 1986)
- VanYpersele, Laurence and Rousseaux, Xavier. "Leaving the War: Popular Violence and Judicial Repression of 'Unpatriotic' Behaviour in Belgium (1918–1921)", European Review of History 2005 12(1): 3–22. ISSN 1350-7486 Fulltext: Ebsco

=== Economic, cultural and social history ===
- Blomme, J. The Economic Development of Belgian Agriculture, 1880–1980 (Leuven, 1992)
- Clark, Samuel. "Nobility, Bourgeoisie and the Industrial Revolution in Belgium", Past & Present (1984) # 105 pp. 140–175; in JSTOR
- Clough, Shepard B. A history of the Flemish Movement in Belgium: A study in nationalism (1930)
- de Vries, Johan. "Benelux, 1920–1970", in C. M. Cipolla, ed. The Fontana Economic History of Europe: Contemporary Economics Part One (1976) pp. 1–71
- Deschouwer, Kris. "Ethnic structure, inequality and governance of the public sector in Belgium." Ethnic Inequalities and Public Sector Governance I UNRISD/Palgrave Macmillan, Basingstoke, 2006). online
- Dhondt, Jan, and Marinette Bruwier in Carlo Cipolla, The Emergence of Industrial Societies-1 (Fontana, 1970) pp. 329–355
- Houtte, J. A. van. "Economic Development of Belgium and the Netherlands from the Beginning of the Modern Era", Journal of European Economic History 1 (1972), pp. 100–120
- Lijphart, Arend. Conflict and coexistence in Belgium: the dynamics of a culturally divided society (1981).
- Milward, A. S. and S. B. Saul. The Economic Development of Continental Europe, 1780–1870 (1973), pp. 292–296, 432–453. online
- Mokyr, Joel. "The Industrial Revolution in the Low Countries in the First Half of the Nineteenth Century: A Comparative Case Study", Journal of Economic History (1974) 34#2 pp. 365–399 JSTOR 2116987
- Mokyr, J. Industrialization in the Low Countries, 1795–1850 (New Haven, 1976).
- Mommens, A. The Belgian Economy in the Twentieth Century (London, 1994)
- Silverman, Debora. "'Modernité Sans Frontières:' Culture, Politics, and the Boundaries of the Avant-Garde in King Leopold's Belgium, 1885–1910." American Imago (2011) 68#4 pp. 707–797. online
- Zolberg, Aristide R. "The Making of Flemings and Walloons: Belgium: 1830–1914", Journal of Interdisciplinary History (1974) 5#2 pp. 179–235 in JSTOR

=== Historiography and memory ===
- Beyen, Marnix, and Benoît Majerus. "Weak and strong nations in the Low Countries: National historiography and its 'Others' in Belgium, Luxembourg, and the Netherlands in the nineteenth and twentieth centuries." in The contested nation: ethnicity, class, religion and gender in national histories (2008): 283–310.
- Christiaens, Kim. "From the East to the South, and back? International solidarity movements in Belgium and new histories of the Cold War, 1950s–1970s." Dutch Crossing 39.3 (2015): 187–203.
- Lagrou, Pieter. "Victims of genocide and national memory: Belgium, France and the Netherlands 1945-1965." Past & present 154 (1997): 181–222. online
- Marnef, Guido. "Belgian and Dutch Post-war Historiography on the Protestant and Catholic Reformation in the Netherlands." Archiv für Reformationsgeschichte 100.1 (2009): 271–292.
- Pasture, Patrick. "Views from Abroad. Foreign Historians on a Small State by the North Sea. With Reflections on Historical Writing in Belgium and Elsewhere." Revue Belge de Philologie et d'Histoire 35 (2005): 4+ online
- Silverman, Debora L. "Diasporas of art: history, the Tervuren Royal museum for Central Africa, and the politics of memory in Belgium, 1885–2014." Journal of Modern History 87.3 (2015): 615–667. online
- Stanard, Matthew G. "Selling the Empire Between the Wars: Colonial Expositions in Belgium, 1920–1940." French Colonial History (2005) 6: 159–178. in JSTOR
- Stanard, Matthew G. (2012). Selling the Congo: A history of European pro-empire propaganda and the making of Belgian imperialism. University of Nebraska Press.
- Stanard, Matthew G. "Belgium, the Congo, and Imperial Immobility: A Singular Empire and the Historiography of the Single Analytic Field", French Colonial History (2014) 15 pp. 87–109.
- Tollebeek, Jo. "Historical representation and the Nation-State in romantic Belgium (1830–1850)." Journal of the History of Ideas 59.2 (1998): 329–353. online
- Tollebeek, Jo. "An Era of Grandeur. The Middle Ages in Belgian National Historiography, 1830–1914." in The Uses of the Middle Ages in Modern European States (Palgrave Macmillan, London, 2011) pp. 113–135.
- Van Den Bossche, G. M. H. "Historians as advisers to revolution? Imagining the Belgian nation." History of European ideas 24.3 (1998): 213–238.
- Van den Braembussche, Antoon. "The silence of Belgium: Taboo and trauma in Belgian memory." Yale French Studies 102 (2002): 35–52. online
- Van den Eeckhout, Patricia. "The quest for social history in Belgium (1948–1998)." Archiv für Sozialgeschichte 40 (2000): 321–336. online
- Vanthemsche, Guy (2012). Belgium and the Congo, 1885–1980. Cambridge University Press. ISBN 978-0-5211-9421-1.
- Verschaffel, Tom. "The modernization of historiography in 18th-century Belgium." History of European ideas 31.2 (2005): 135–146. online
- Vos, Louis. "Reconstructions of the past in Belgium and Flanders." in Secession, history and the social sciences (2002): 179–206. online Archived 2021-07-31 at the Wayback Machine
- Warland, Geneviève, ed. Experience and memory of the first World War in Belgium: Comparative and interdisciplinary insights (Waxmann Verlag, 2019) excerpt.
- Wouters, Nico. "Historiography 1918-Today (Belgium)." International Encyclopedia of the First World War (2015): 1–11. online
