= Eulenspiegel =

Eulenspiegel (Ulenspiegel, Ulenspegel, Uilenspiegel) or Till Eulenspiegel (Dyl Ulenspiegel and variants) may refer to:

- Till Eulenspiegel, a prankster in German folklore

== Literature ==
- Eulenspiegel (magazine) - a satirical magazine in Germany, formerly in East Germany
- Ulenspiegel (magazine), a defunct satirical magazine in postwar Germany, published December 1945–1950
- Eulenspiegel, a light novel by Tow Ubukata
- Thyl Ulenspiegel (The Legend of Thyl Ulenspiegel and Lamme Goedzak), (1868), by Charles De Coster

== Music ==
- Ulenspiegel (opera), by Walter Braunfels
- Till Eulenspiegel (Karetnikov)
- Till Eulenspiegel's Merry Pranks, a tone poem by Richard Strauss
- Wie Till Eulenspiegel lebte, by Emil von Reznicek (1860-1945)
- Uilenspiegel, de geus ballet Op.67 (1976) by Willem Kersters
- Thyl Uilenspiegel, symphonic poem (1927) by Flor Alpaerts

== See also ==
- The Eulenspiegel Society - a BDSM support group in New York City
