= Lamme Goedzak =

Character in The Legend of Thyl Ulenspiegel and Lamme Goedzak

- The Legend of Thyl Ulenspiegel and Lamme Goedzak character
- Drawing of Lamme Goedzak by Auguste Oleffe
- Created by: Charles De Coster
- Portrayed by: Lucien Van Obbergh; Jean Carmet; Anton Peters; Rudi Falkenhagen; Yevgeny Leonov

In-universe information
- Gender: Male
- Occupation: Ship's cook (for the Sea Beggars)
- Spouse: Calleken Huybrechts
- Religion: Protestantism
- Nationality: Spanish Netherlands (Flemish)

Lamme Goedzak is a character in Charles De Coster's novel The Legend of Thyl Ulenspiegel and Lamme Goedzak (1867). He is the best friend of Thyl Ulenspiegel. While Ulenspiegel himself is derived from Dutch-German-Flemish folklore, Lamme Goedzak is entirely created by De Coster. Despite this, he has become one of the most recognizable Flemish folklore characters since.

Camille Huysmans, in his commentary on De Coster, considered Lamme Goedzak to be modeled on Sancho Panza, Don Quixote's loyal companion in the novel by Miguel de Cervantes.

== Character ==
Lamme Goedzak's name literally translates as "lazy kind soul", which already hints at his personality. Lamme is a jolly, good-natured, if somewhat naïve, man. He functions as a sidekick to Ulenspiegel, with whom he shares his knack for fooling other people, especially clergymen and the Spanish invaders. While sometimes slow-witted, Lamme is nevertheless Tijl's most loyal friend.

Lamme is also known for being a Bruegelian bon vivant who enjoys eating and drinking. When depicted on book illustrations, he is usually carrying food and wine.

In the novel, some information about Lamme's background history is provided. As a child, he ran away from home because his younger sister taunted him and he wasn't assertive enough to do something about it. Although married, he has lost track of his wife, Calleken Huybrechts, and desperately seeks her while resisting the temptation of other women. Eventually, it turns out that the wife - a staunch Catholic while Goedzak himself is a Protestant - has been misled by an unscrupulous monk into taking a vow of abstinence.

While searching for her, Goedzak, along with Ulenspiegel, is drawn into the Dutch Revolt against Spanish rule, and, despite his fatness and indolence, manages to prove his mettle in various perilous situations. Finally, he finds an ideal slot as a ship's cook on one of the vessels of the Sea Beggars, the famed rebel/pirate fleet harassing the Spanish; it is commonly agreed that he could take as many extra helpings as he wants from his own excellent dishes. Eventually, after a long and hard search, Goedzak finds his wife, proves to her the hypocrisy of the monk, and they are happily reunited.

== Cultural status ==
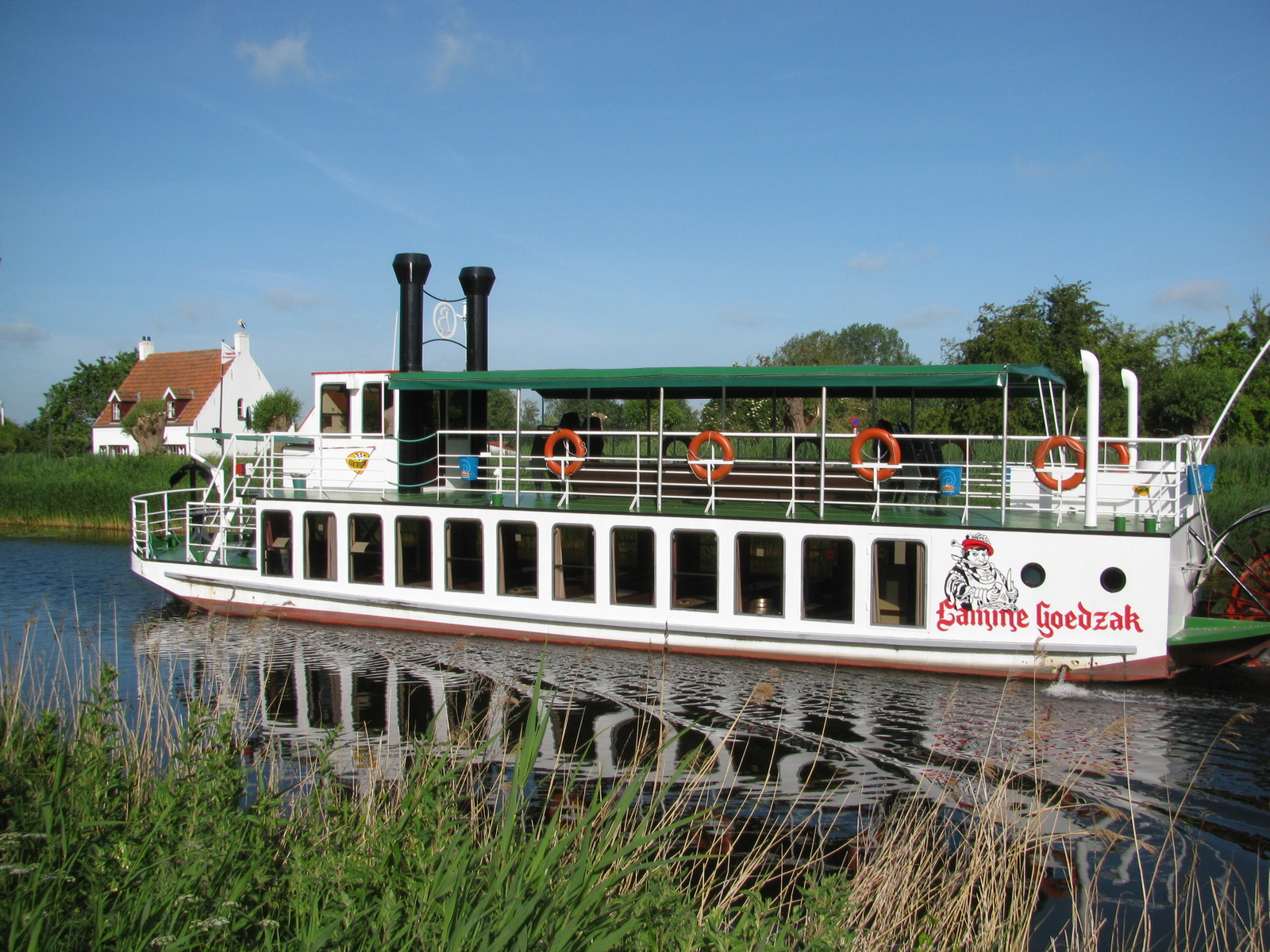
The boat trip Lamme Goedzak on the Damse Vaart

The expression "lamme goedzak" has become an eponym in the Dutch language, referring to a "good, loveable, but naïve person, prone to being taken advantage of." The term is also used for obese, jolly people who enjoying eating and drinking. Certain Flemish comics characters, like Lambik and Nero, have also been compared with Lamme Goedzak in terms of character.

A boat trip from Bruges to Damme has been named after him, a theater company in Bruges, a local history organization in Ruddervoorde and a beer brand. Various restaurants and cafés in Lebbeek, Breda, Belsele, Zoersel, Noordwijk, and Bonn.

Jean Carmet played Lamme in the 1956 film adaptation of the story, Les Aventures de Till L'Espiègle.

In the Flemish TV series "Tijl Uilenspiegel" (1961) Anton Peters played the part of Lamme.

Ray Goossens had a 1945 comic strip based on Tijl Uilenspiegel, where Tijl and Lamme Goedzak were portrayed as a comedic duo. The series was sometimes called Tijl en Lamme too.

Willy Vandersteen used Lamme Goedzak in his 1952-1954 comic book adaptation of "Tijl Uilenspiegel". In Vandersteen's final comics series, De Geuzen (1985-1990), which is set in the 16th century, the central character is a young intelligent man named Hannes. His sidekick is an obese man who enjoys eating and drinking and who is clearly an expy of Lamme Goedzak, down to his name "Tamme".
