= De Geuzen =

Belgian comics series

- Cover to album 5, Soetkin, de waanzinnige
- Author: Willy Vandersteen
- Current status/schedule: Discontinued
- Launch date: 1985
- End date: 1990
- Publisher: Standaard Uitgeverij
- Genre(s): Historical comics, adventure, humor
- Original language: Dutch

De Geuzen ("The Geuzen") was a Belgian comics series, drawn by Willy Vandersteen from 1985 until his death in 1990. It was his final project before he died.

== Setting ==
De Geuzen is set in Flanders in the 16th century and follows the adventures of Hannes, a young brave man, and his friends Nele and Tamme, who fight the Spanish oppressors on the side of the Geuzen. Similar in theme to the thirty years older Tijl Uilenspiegel, the comic combined many of Vandersteen's passions, including the art of Pieter Brueghel the Elder and the novel The Legend of Thyl Ulenspiegel and Lamme Goedzak by Charles de Coster. The characters are very similar to the protagonists of De Coster's novel. At the end of every album a graphic drawing of Breughel was reproduced, most of his Seven Sins and Seven Virtues series.

Vandersteen originally made a synopsis for the series in 1972, but apart from ten preliminary sketches the concept didn't go anywhere. Instead he drew the series "Robert en Bertrand". In 1985 he passed this series on to his assistants and finally made work of "De Geuzen". Originally the tone was more comedic, including anachronistic jokes and references, such as the villains Johan Rattenbol, "aka J.R." and Alexis Kollebie. From the third album on the stories and artwork became more realistic and serious. Overall the series was also notably more adult in its subject matter, compared to Vandersteen's older family friendly series. The comics were not prepublished and were mostly created by Vandersteen alone, though he did receive some minor assistance of Eric de Rop, Eugeen Goossens and Rita Bernaers. The lack of deadlines ensured the quality but also decreased the publication rhythm. Only ten albums were published and Vandersteen made it clear in his testament that nobody else was allowed to continue the series after his death.

== Characters ==
Main characters Veerle, Hannes & Tamme

- Hannes: A young, strong, handsome and brave troubadour. He is very similar to Till Eulenspiegel.
- Veerle: A farmer's daughter who is Hannes' girlfriend. She is similar to Nele, Till Eulenspiegel's girlfriend in The Legend of Thyl Ulenspiegel and Lamme Goedzak.
- Carolus and Boelkin: Veerle's parents, who are both farmers. They are obviously inspired by Claes and Soetkin, the parents of Thyl Eulenspiegel in The Legend of Thyl Ulenspiegel and Lamme Goedzak.
- Tamme: A servant of Carolus and friend of Hannes who adores eating and drinking. He is obviously inspired by Lamme Goedzak.
- Witte Weerlicht: Veerle's white horse.
- Dostranamus: A bearded alchemist and magician, whose name is a pun on Nostradamus.
- Alwina: Dostranamus' wife.
- Maldor: A hermit, alchemist and scientist.

== Albums ==
1. "De zeven jagers" (1985)
2. "De ekster op de galg" (1986)
3. "Flodderbes, de heks" (1986)
4. "De rattenvanger" (1987)
5. "Soetkin, de waanzinnige" (1987)
6. "Onheil boven Damme" (1988)
7. "Strijd om slot Loevestein" (1989)
8. "Verraad in Duindijke" (1989)
9. "De nacht van de satanszoon" (1989)
10. "De wildeman van Gaasbeek" (1990)

== See also ==
• Belgian comics • Franco-Belgian comics • Ligne claire
