= Till Eulenspiegel =

Fictional character from German folklore

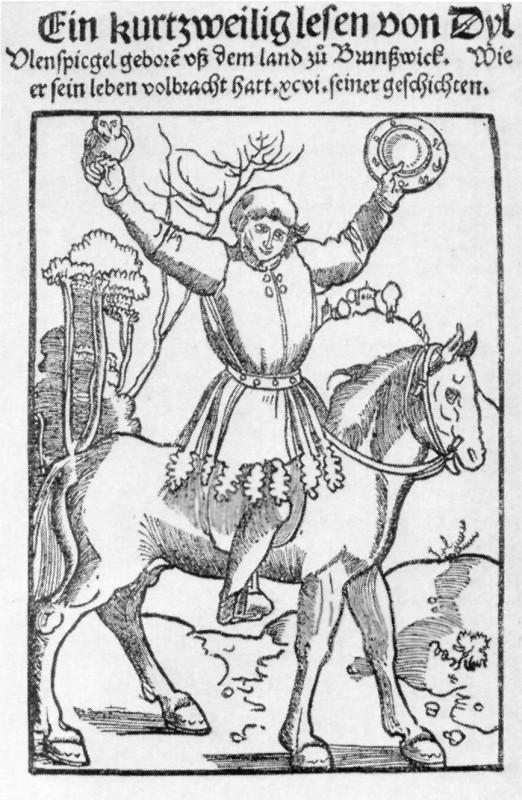
The prankster Till Eulenspiegel, depicted with owl and mirror (title page of the Strasbourg edition of 1515)

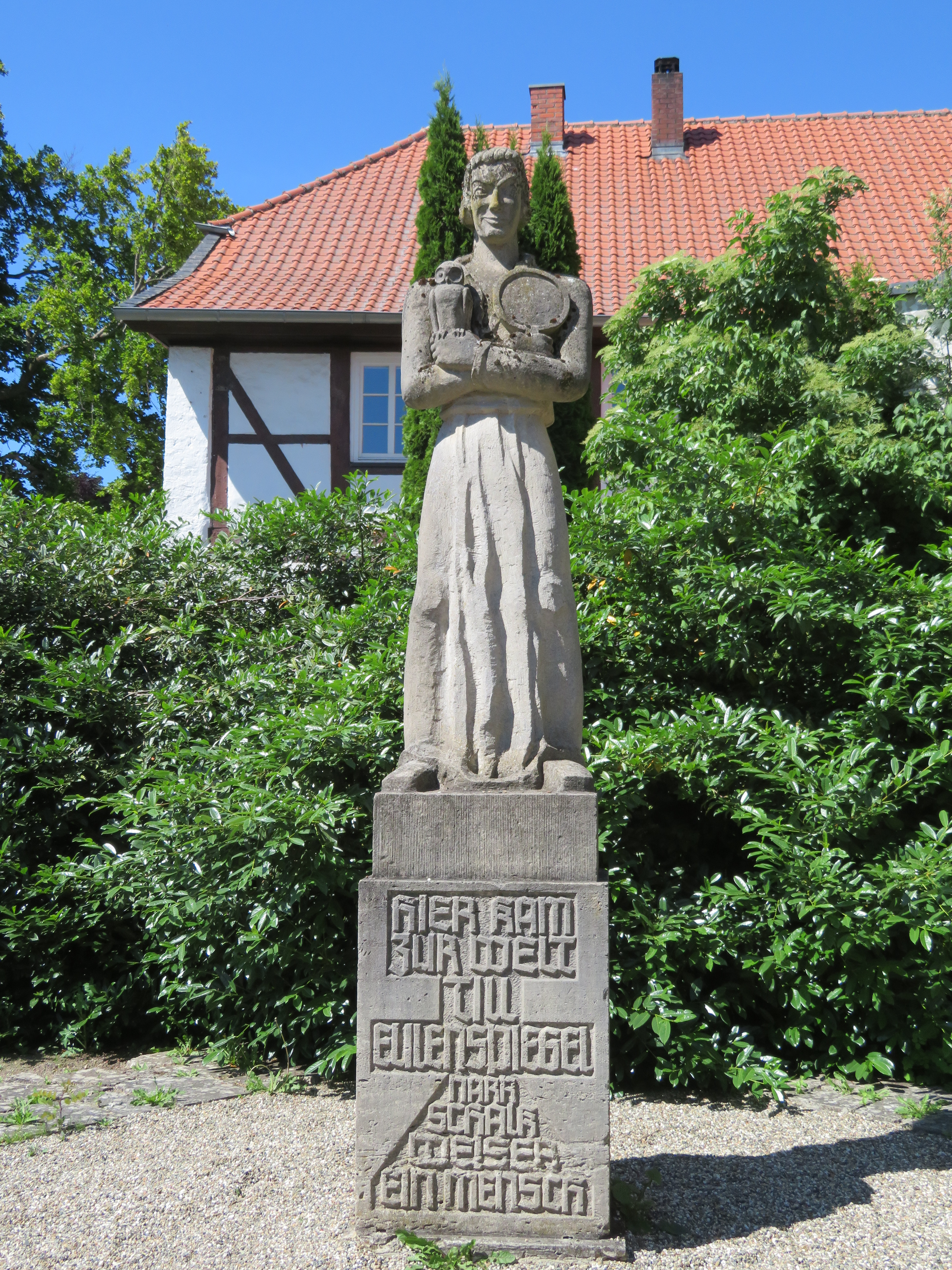
Eulenspiegel Memorial in Kneitlingen

Till Eulenspiegel (German pronunciation: [tɪl ˈʔɔʏlənˌʃpiːɡəl]; Low German: Dyl Ulenspegel [dɪl ˈʔuːlnˌspeɪɡl̩]) is the protagonist of a European narrative tradition. A German chapbook published around 1510 is the oldest known extant publication about the folk hero (a first edition of c. 1510/12 is preserved fragmentarily), but a background in earlier Middle Low German folklore is likely. The character may have been based on a historical person.

Eulenspiegel is a native of the Duchy of Brunswick-Lüneburg whose picaresque career takes him to many places throughout the Holy Roman Empire. He plays practical jokes on his contemporaries, at every turn exposing vices. His life is set in the first half of the 14th century, and the final chapters of the chapbook describe his death from the plague of 1350.

Eulenspiegel's surname translates to "owl-mirror"; and the frontispiece of the 1515 chapbook, as well as his alleged tombstone in Mölln, Schleswig-Holstein, render it as a rebus comprising an owl and a hand mirror. It has been suggested that the name is in fact a pun on a Low German phrase that translates as "wipe-arse".

Modern retellings of the Eulenspiegel story have been published since the latter 19th century. The Legend of Thyl Ulenspiegel and Lamme Goedzak, by Charles De Coster (1867), transfers the character to the period of the Reformation and the Dutch Revolt; the novel's Ulenspiegel (in modern Dutch, Tijl Uilenspiegel) was adopted as a symbol by the Flemish Movement.

== Origin and historicity ==
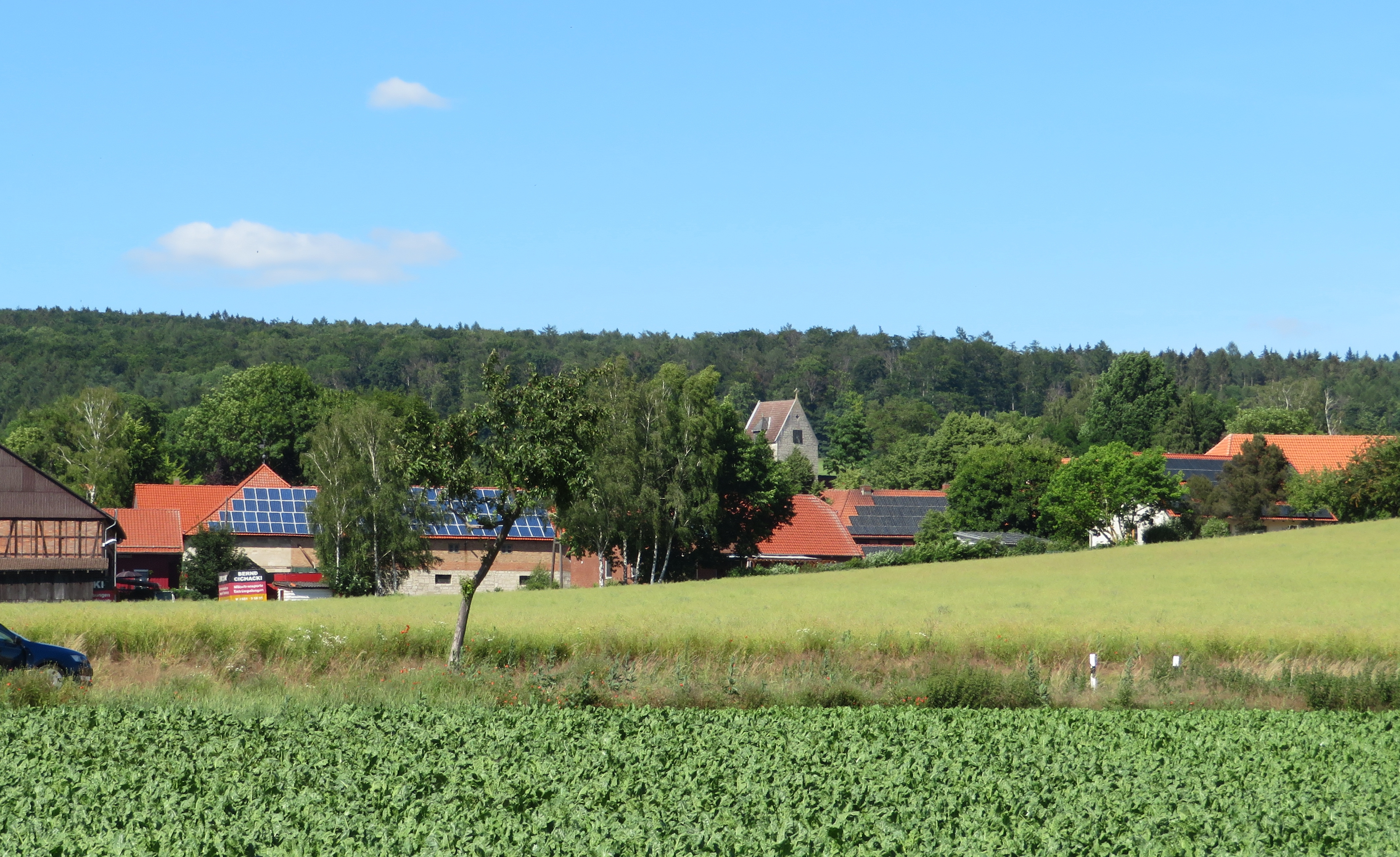
Kneitlingen, the place of birth of Till Eulenspiegel

According to the chapbook, Eulenspiegel was born in Kneitlingen in Lower Saxony near Brunswick around 1300. As a vagrant (Landfahrer), he travelled through the Holy Roman Empire, especially Northern Germany, but also the Low Countries, Bohemia, and Italy. He is said to have died in Mölln, Schleswig-Holstein, near Lübeck and Hamburg, of the Black Death in 1350.

The first known chapbook on Eulenspiegel was printed in c. 1510–1512 in Strasbourg. It is reasonable to place the folkloristic origins of the tradition in the 15th century, although, in spite of suggestions to the effect "that the name 'Eulenspiegel' was used in tales of rogues and liars in Lower Saxony as early as 1400", 15th-century references to a Till Eulenspiegel turn out to be surprisingly elusive. The text of the first extant edition, printed by Johannes Grüninger, is in the High German language. There has been a debate surrounding the possible existence of an older Low German edition, now lost. This version has been attributed to Hans Dorn, the only known printer active in Brunswick at the beginning of the 16th century (active from at least 1502). Sodmann (1980) in support of this hypothesis adduced the woodcut of a fool on horseback holding a hand mirror used by Dorn in later prints, as the title illustration of his Liber Vagatorum and Grobianus, which may originally have served as the title illustration of the lost Eulenspiegel edition.

There are several suggestions as to the author of the 1510 chapbook, none of which has gained mainstream acceptance. Candidates include Thomas Murner, Hermann Bote, Hieronymus Brunschwig, or an author collective surrounding Johannes Grüninger, including Thomas Murner, Johannes Adelphus, Tilemann Conradi and Hermannus Buschius. The author of the 1515 edition in a short preface identifies himself only as "N". He gives the year 1500 as the date when he originally began to collect the tales, stressing the difficulty of the project and how he wanted to abandon it several times, saying that he is now publishing it after all to "lighten the mood in hard times". The preface also announces the inclusion of material from Pfaff Amis and Pfaff vom Kahlenberg, but no such material is present in the 1515 edition.

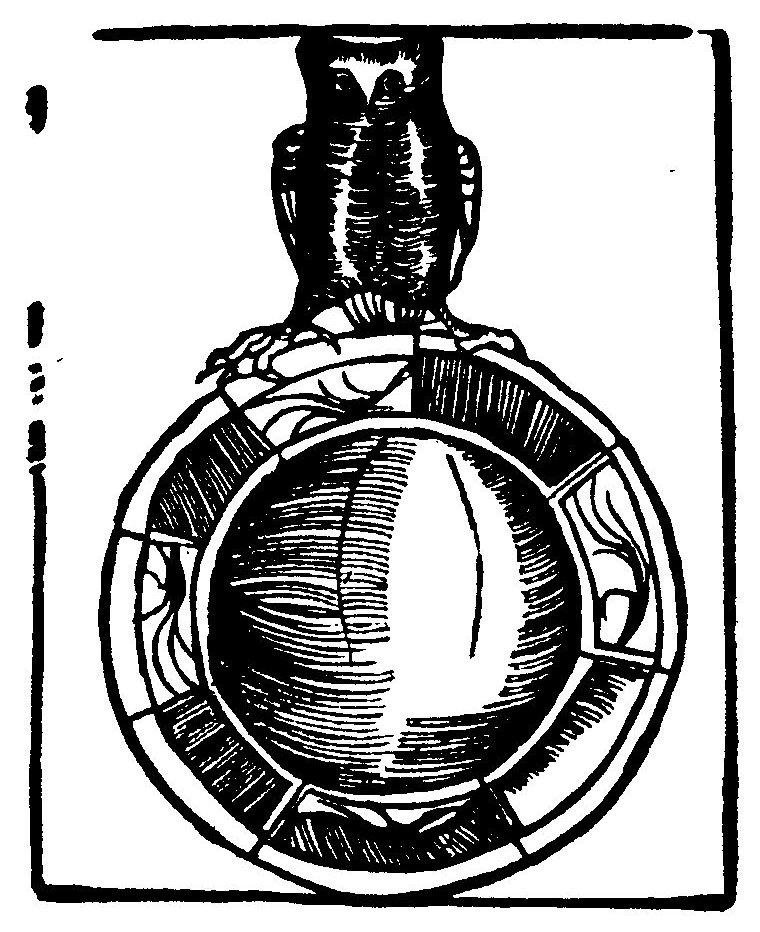
Owl-and-mirror rebus from the depiction of Eulenspiegel's tombstone and epitaph in the 1515 edition (fol. 130)

The literal translation of the High German name "Eulenspiegel" is "owl-mirror" (hence owle-glasse). It is both innocuous and indicative of his character and has been explained as a garbled form of an expression for "wipe-the-arse".

Many of Till's pranks are scatological in nature, and involve tricking people into touching, smelling, or even eating Till's excrement. Scatological stories abound, beginning with Till's early childhood (in which he rides behind his father and exposes his rear-end to the townspeople) and persisting until his death bed (where he tricks a priest into soiling his hands with feces).

In modern scholarship, there have been some attempts to find evidence for the historicity of Till Eulenspiegel's person. Hucker (1980) mentions that according to a contemporary legal register of the city of Brunswick one Till van Cletlinge ('Till from/of Kneitlingen') was incarcerated there in the year 1339, along with four of his accomplices, for highway robbery.

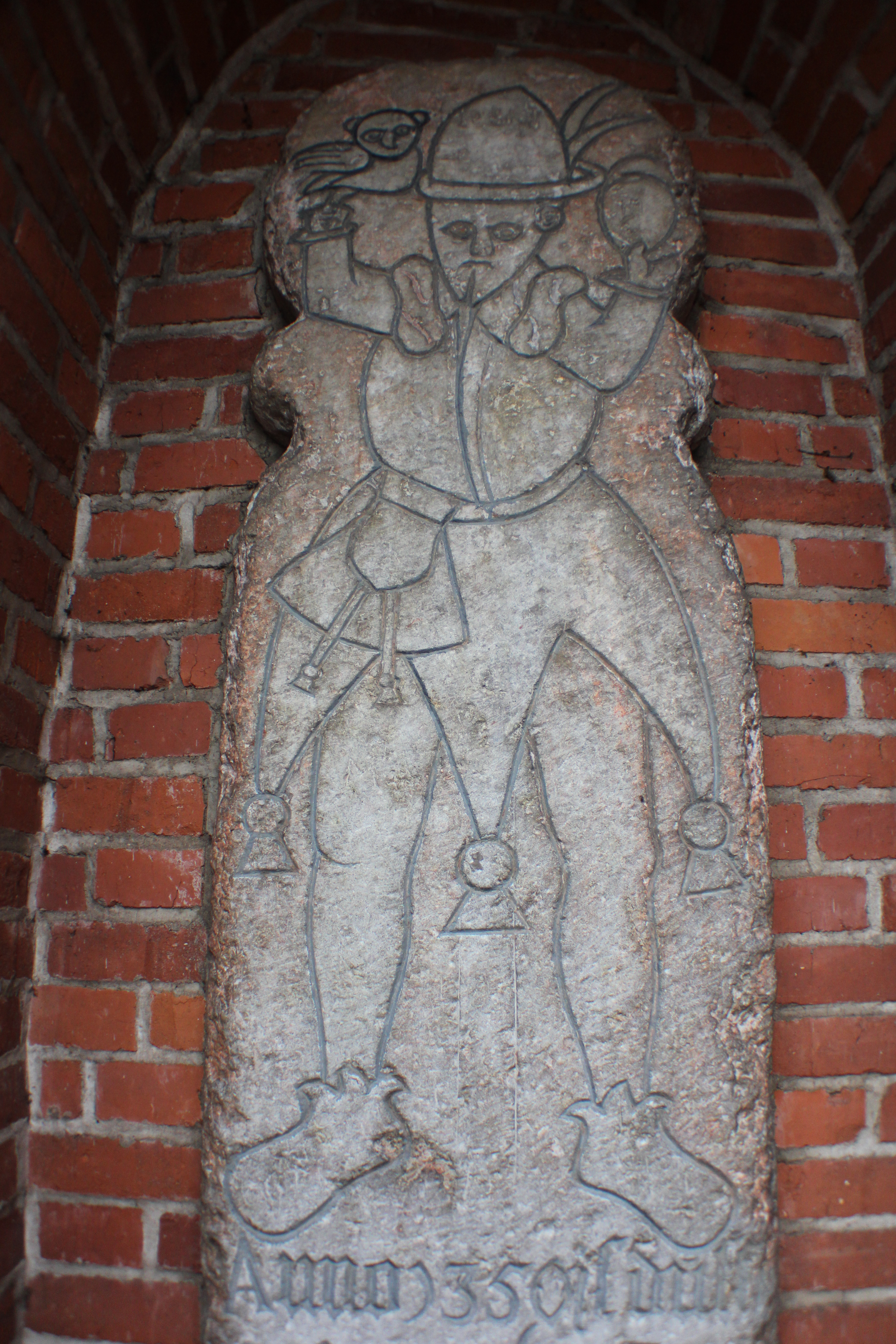
Upper half of "Eulenspiegel's tombstone" in Mölln, Schleswig-Holstein

In Mölln, the reported site of Eulenspiegel's death and burial in the plague year of 1350, a memorial stone was commissioned by the town council in 1544, now on display in an alcove on the outside wall of the tower of St. Nicolai church. The stone is inscribed in Low German, as follows:

Anno 1350 is dusse / steen upgehaven und / Tyle ulen spegel lenet / hier under begraven. / Marcket wol und / dencket dran. wat / ick gwest si up eren. / All de hir vor aver / gan. moten mi / glick weren.

Translation:

This stone was carved in 1350, and Tyl Ulenspegel lies buried underneath. Note well and remember what I have been on Earth. All those who pass here will become as I am now.

The inscription (including the date of 1350) was allegedly copied from an older tombstone, now lost. This older tombstone is referred to in the chapbook of 1515, and it is mentioned as still being extant in 1536. The 1544 stone is mentioned by Fynes Moryson in his Itinerary of 1591. Moryson also reports that in his time, the citizens of Mölln held a yearly festival in Eulenspiegel's honour, on which occasion they would present the clothes worn by Eulenspiegel when he died.

== Chapbook tradition ==
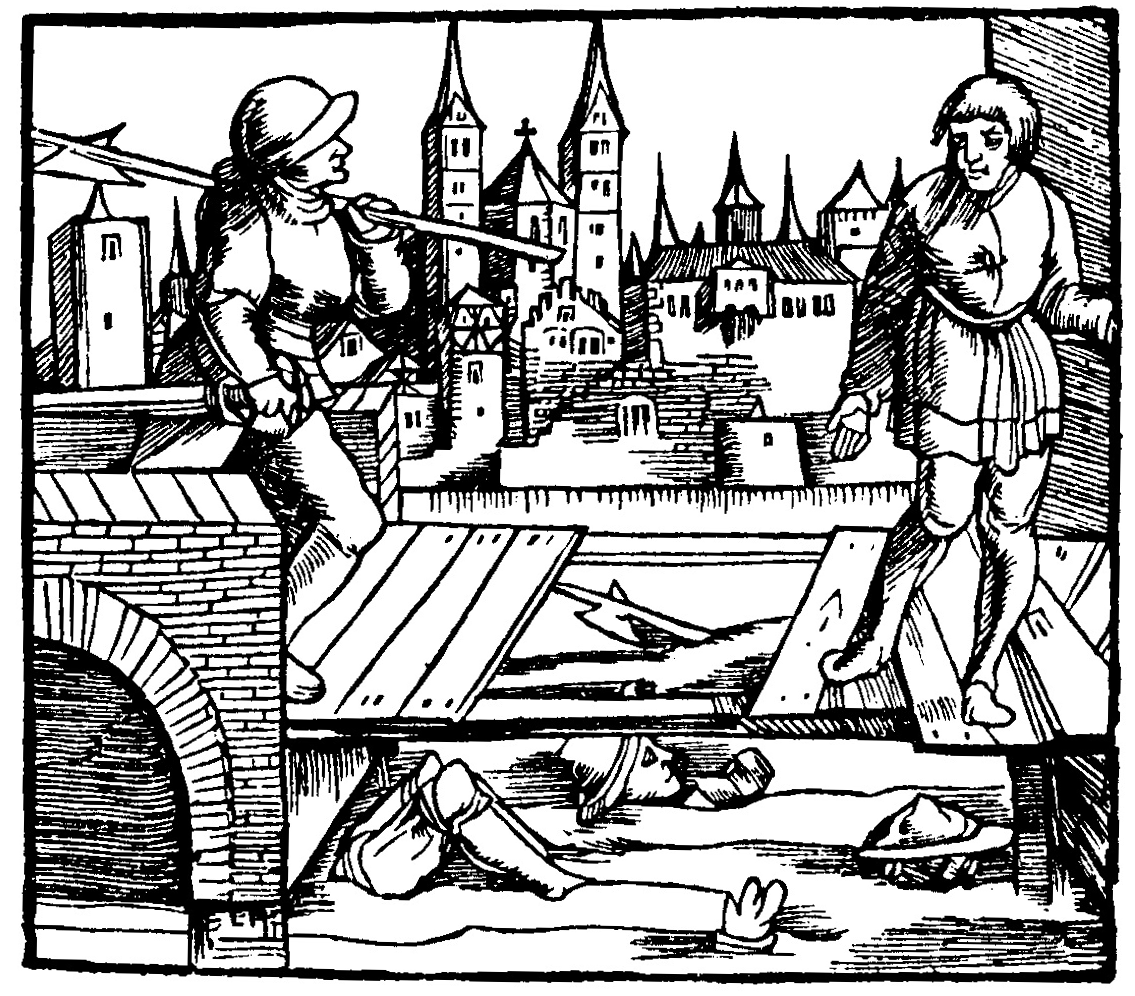
Woodcut for the 32nd chapter in the 1515 edition: Eulenspiegel is pursued by Nuremberg guards, he leads them across a broken bridge and they fall into the moat.

The two earliest printed editions, in Early New High German, were printed by Johannes Grüninger in Strasbourg. The first edition was unknown before sixteen folia of printing proofs were discovered in 1971 in the binding of a Latin edition of Reynard. Peter Honegger dated these pages to 1510/11 based on the type used, but this date has since been called into question. Only a single specimen of the first edition has been preserved, discovered in 1975. Thirty folia are missing, including the title page. A previous owner has replaced the missing pages by pages torn from an Eulenspiegel edition of c. 1700. It was most likely published in 1512. The sixteen folia discovered by Honegger are likely printing proofs for this edition. It consists of 100 folia with 66 woodcuts of high quality.

The 1515 edition was also printed by Grüninger in Strasbourg. Its full title reads:

Ein kurtzweilig Lesen von Dyl Ulenspiegel, geboren uß dem Land zu Brunßwick, wie er sein leben volbracht hatt, xcvi seiner geschichten.

Translation:

A diverting read of Dyl Ulenspiegel, born in the land of Brunswick, how he spent his life; 96 of his stories.

The text is divided into 95 chapters (numbered to 96 as chapter number 42 is missing). The 1515 edition is missing many of the illustrations of the older edition, and showing signs of careless copying of the text. It is uncertain how many of these chapters were present in the earlier edition of 1510/12, although some of the chapters appear to be later additions. The initials of the final six chapters form the acrostic ERMANB, which has been taken as a hidden reference to the book's author. The first chapters are dedicated to Till's childhood. In chapter nine, Till leaves his mother and begins his life as a vagrant. He takes up diverse occupations, but each chapter ends with his moving on to another place. The final seven chapters are dedicated to his death and burial.

In the chapbooks, Eulenspiegel is presented as a trickster who plays practical jokes on his contemporaries, exposing vices at every turn, greed and folly, hypocrisy and foolishness. As Peter Carels notes, "The fulcrum of his wit in a large number of the tales is his literal interpretation of figurative language." (Previously, Goethe made a similar observation.) Although craftsmen are featured as the principal victims of his pranks, neither the nobility nor the pope is exempt from being affected by him.

A third Strasbourg edition, of 1519, is better yet and is usually used in modern editions to provide the sections that are missing in the surviving 1510/12 copy.

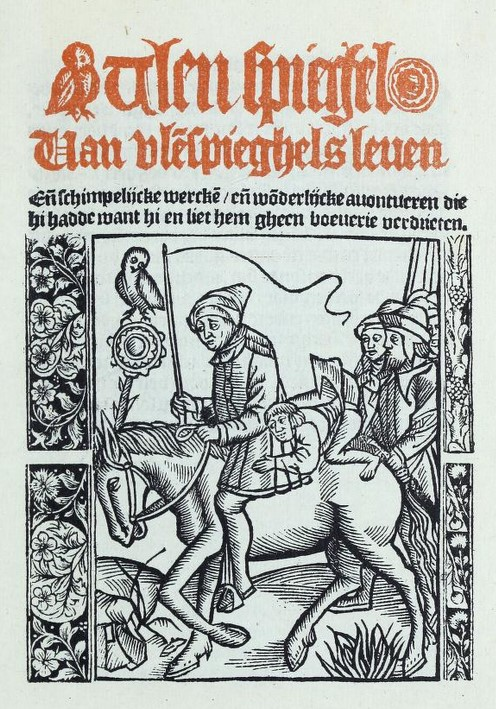
Frontispiece of first Dutch-language Ulenspieghel, printed by Michiel Hillen van Hoochstraten, 1525–1546

The 'Antwerp group' of Eulenspiegel editions comprises a number of Flemish, French and English publications. The dating of these publications is still an issue of contention. The Antwerp printer Michiel Hillen van Hoochstraten is believed to have printed the first Dutch-language version of the Till Eulenspiegel story. In the past, the Hillen edition was dated to 1512 or 1519, but recent scholarship places it in the period between 1525 and 1546. Michiel Hillen van Hoochstraten appears to have used for his translation a German text, in manuscript or printed, that is now lost, which antedated the Grüninger edition. Jan van Doesborch is believed to have printed the first English translation in Antwerp possibly as early as 1520. In this edition the name Ulenspiegel is rendered Howleglas (as it were "owl-glass"). Later English editions, derived from the Antwerp group, were printed by William Copland in London, in 1547 and 1568.

Owleglasse is mentioned in Henry Porter's The Two Angry Women of Abington (1599) and again in Ben Jonson's comedic play The Alchemist (1610).

The first modern edition of the chapbook of 1519 is by Lappenberg (1854). Lappenberg was not yet aware of the existence of the 1515 edition. The 1515 and 1519 editions were published in facsimile by Insel-Ferlag in 1911 and 1979, respectively. An English translation by Paul Oppenheimer was published in 1972.

Editions of Eulenspiegel in German, Dutch, Flemish, French and English remained popular throughout the early modern period. By the late 17th century, Eulenspiegel and his pranks had become proverbial, with the French adjective espiègle "impish, mischievous" derived from his name. The German noun Eulenspiegelei (as it were "owlglassery") is recorded in the early 19th century.

== Modern reception ==
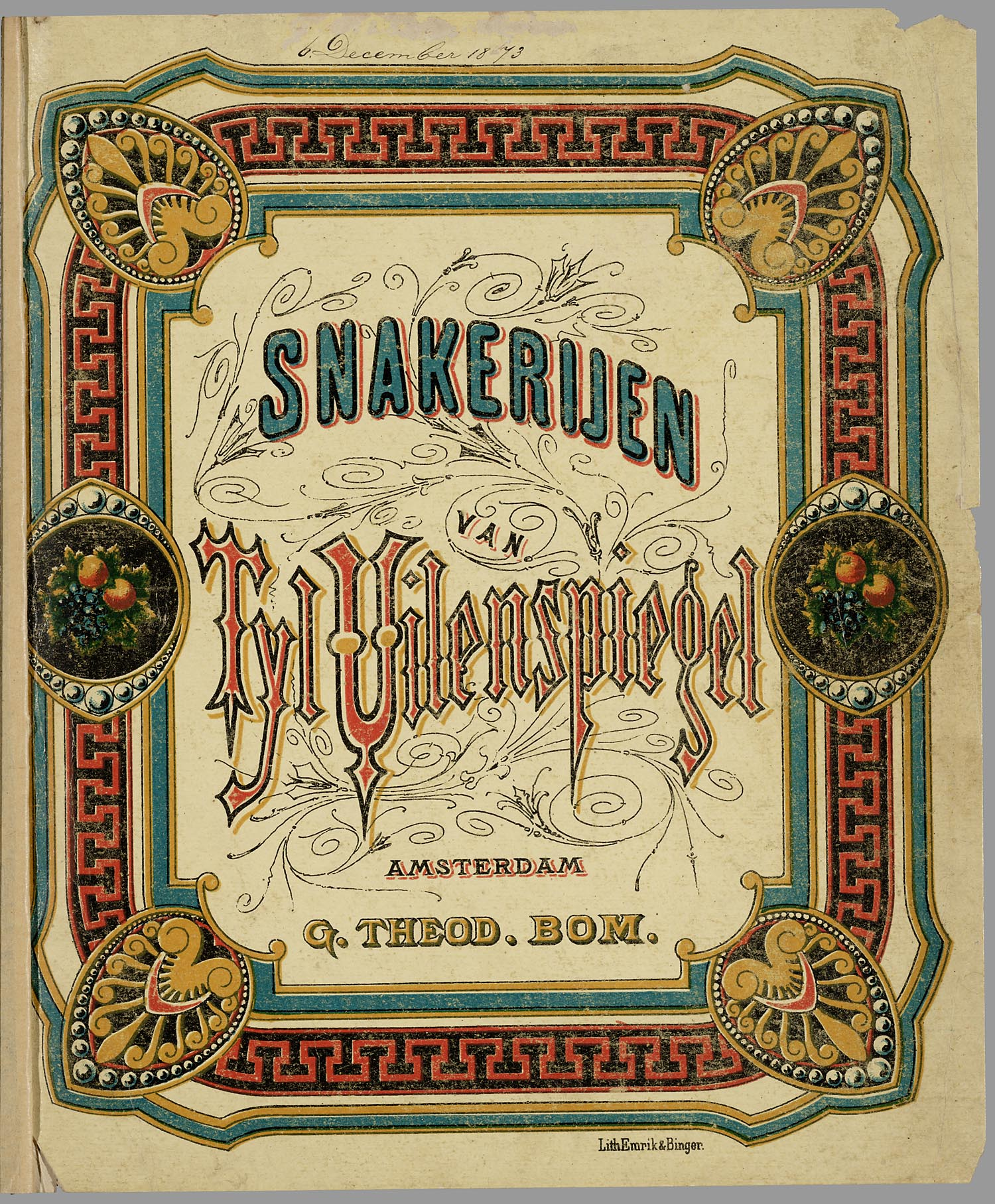
Snakerijen van Tijl Uilenspiegel (Pranks of Till Eulenspiegel), Dutch children's picture book, c. 1873

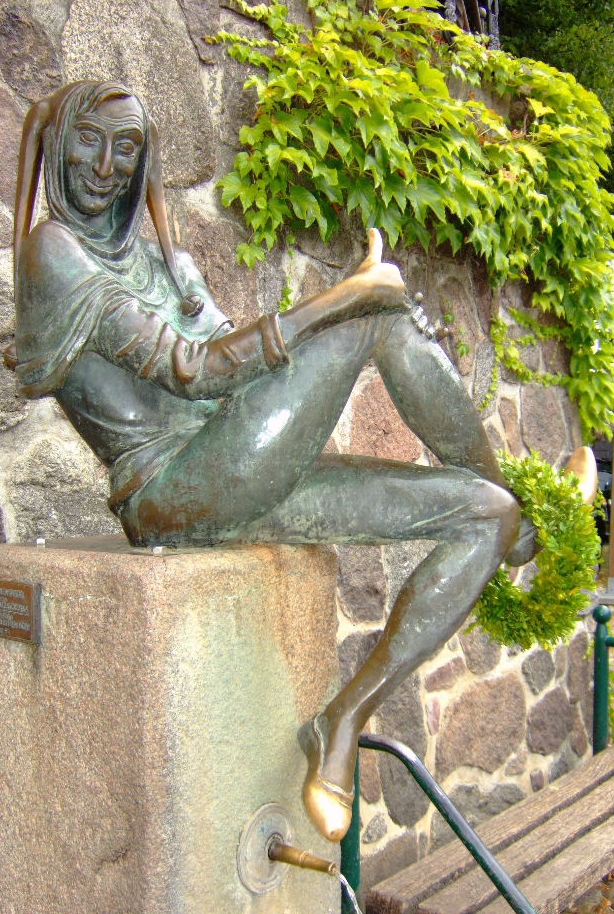
Till Eulenspiegel fountain in Mölln (1951)

=== Literature ===
Hans Sachs (1494–1576), the renowned Meistersinger of Nuremberg, drew material from the Volksbuch for 46 of his comic tales (Schwänke) and Carnival plays (Fastnachtspiele). Thirty of the Schwänke were set to Meistersinger melodies (Töne). Fellow Nuremberger Jacob Ayrer (1544–1605) also produced an Eulenspiegel Carnival play.

In the eighteenth century, German satirists adopted episodes for social satire, and in the nineteenth and early twentieth century versions of the tales were bowdlerized to render them fit for children, who had come to be considered their chief natural audience, by expurgating their many scatological references.

The Legend of Thyl Ulenspiegel and Lamme Goedzak, an 1867 novel by Belgian author Charles De Coster, has been translated, often in mutilated versions, into many languages. It was De Coster who first transferred Ulenspiegel from his original late medieval surroundings to the Protestant Reformation. In this version, Ulenspiegel was born in Damme, West Flanders and became a Protestant hero of the Dutch Revolt. The author gives him a father, Claes, and mother, Soetkin, as well as a girlfriend, Nele, and a best friend, Lamme Goedzak. In the course of the story Claes is taken prisoner by the Spanish oppressors and burned at the stake, while Soetkin goes insane as a result. This tempts Thyl to start resistance against the Spanish oppressors. Thanks to the 1867 novel, Ulenspiegel has become a symbol of Flemish nationalism, with a statue dedicated to him in Damme.

Alfred Jarry, author of Gestes et opinions du Docteur Faustroll, pataphysicien (1911), mentions Ulenspiegel's unruly behaviour in the Appendix chapter entitled Les poteaux de la morale: "Till Ulenspiegel, on s'en souvient, ne coordonnait point autrement ses opérations mentales : se dirigeant vers un faîte, il se réjouissait du dévalement futur." ("Till Ulenspiegel, we recall, did not coordinate his mental operations differently: heading toward a cliff, he rejoiced in future downfall.")

A French edition, Les Aventures de Til Ulespiègle, was published by Constantin Castéra in 1910. In 1927, Gerhart Hauptmann wrote the verse Till Eulenspiegel.

Ulenspiegel was mentioned in Mikhail Bulgakov's The Master and Margarita as a possible prototype for the black cat character Behemoth.

Michael Rosen adapted the story into a 1989 children's novel, illustrated by Fritz Wegner: The Wicked Tricks of Till Owlyglass, ISBN 978-0744513462.

Daniel Kehlmann in his novel Tyll (2017) places Tyll Ulenspiegel in the context of the Thirty Years' War.

The Italian civil law professor Francesco Gazzoni uses the name Till Eulenspiegel as a pseudonym for himself in his book Favole quasi giuridiche (Semi-juridical Fables).

Thomas Mann uses Till Eulenspiegel in dialogue by the young Hans Castorp in the novel The Magic Mountain (Der Zauberberg) as a metaphor for trickery in speaking of the apparent lag between Earth's astronomical procession around the Sun and the experienced weather—that the declared start and renewal of spring does not start after the winter solstice when the days begin to lengthen, and similarly that autumn should seemingly begin after the summer solstice and yet that is when summer is declared to start.

=== Comics ===
Ray Goossens had a 1945 comic strip based on Tijl Uilenspiegel, where Tijl and Lamme Goedzak were portrayed as a comedic duo. The series was sometimes called Tijl en Lamme too.

Willy Vandersteen drew two comic book albums about Uilenspiegel, "De Opstand der Geuzen" ("The Rebellion of the Geuzen") and "Fort Oranje" ("Fort Orange"), both drawn in a realistic, serious style and pre-published in the Belgian comics magazine Tintin between 1952 and 1954. They were published in comic book album format in 1954 and 1955. The stories were drawn in a realistic style and in some instances followed the original novel very closely, but sometimes followed his own imagination more.

Belgian comics artist George van Raemdonck adapted the novel into a comic strip in 1964.

Between 1985 and 1990, Willy Vandersteen drew a comics series named De Geuzen of whom the three main characters are Hannes, his girlfriend Veerle and Tamme, Hannes' best friend. All are obviously inspired by Tijl Uilenspiegel, Nele and Lamme Goedzak.

=== Theatre ===
Kibbutz theatre director and producer Shulamit Bat-Dori created an open-air production of Till Eulenspiegel at Mishmar HaEmek, Israel, in 1955 that drew 10,000 viewers.

In Moscow in 1974, Grigoriy Gorin adapted De Coster's novel as a play originally entitled The Passion of Tyl. A Two-Part Farcical Comedy (The Passion of had to be removed later) which alluded to the state of the Soviet Union. Performed at the Lenkom Theatre with music by Gennady Gladkov it had elements of rock opera. In 2019, the original libretto was restored and official soundtrack released.

Clive Barker incorporated elements of the Till Eulenspiegel story in his 1982 play Crazyface.

=== Music ===
In 1894–1895, Richard Strauss composed the tone poem, Till Eulenspiegels lustige Streiche, Op. 28.

In 1902, Emil von Reznicek adapted the story as an opera, Till Eulenspiegel.

In 1913, Walter Braunfels adapted the story as an opera, Ulenspiegel.

In 1916, the Ballets Russes adapted the story as a ballet, later re-adapted by George Balanchine for Jerome Robbins at the New York City Ballet.

In the late 1930s or early 1940s, the Russian composer Wladimir Vogel wrote a drama-oratorio, Thyl Claes, derived from De Coster's book.

In 1983, the Soviet composer Nikolai Karetnikov and his librettist, filmmaker Pavel Lungin, released a samizdat opera, Till Eulenspiegel, which received its official release in 1990.

The Polish poet Jacek Kaczmarski wrote an epitaph to Eulenspiegel in 1981 "Epitafium dla Sowizdrzała".

=== Magazines ===
Between 1945 and 1950, a German satirical magazine was called Ulenspiegel. The satirical magazine Eulenspiegel was published from 1954 in Berlin, East Germany.

=== Dance ===
In 1916, choreographer Vaslav Nijinsky created the ballet Till Eulenspiegel set to Till Eulenspiegels lustige Streiche, Op. 28. by Richard Strauss. The libretto was by Vaslav Nijinsky, after Charles De Coster and the costumes were by Robert Edmond Jones. The work premiered on 23 October 1916 at the Manhattan Opera House in New York City.

=== Films ===
In 1956, the film Les Aventures de Till L'Espiègle was made by Gérard Philipe and Joris Ivens, which adapted De Coster's novel. (English title: "Bold Adventure"). The film was a French-East German co-production.

In 1965, the Belgian animated short Chomophobia, made by Raoul Servais, features Eulenspiegel.

In 1973, Walter van der Kamp directed Uilenspiegel, a Dutch film.

Rainer Simon directed Till Eulenspiegel in 1975, which was an East German production made for State Television. Due to nudity, it was not suitable for children as State Television banned airing the film before 7pm.

Ulenspiegel (Legenda o Tile), was a 1976 Soviet film, based on De Coster's novel, and directed by Aleksandr Alov and Vladimir Naumov, "The Legend of Till Ullenspiegel" (1976).

In 2003, Eberhard Junkersdorf adapted the story into a feature-length animated film.

In 2014, Christian Theede directed the film Till Eulenspiegel.

=== Television ===
In 1961, the BRT (nowadays the VRT) made a children's TV series, Tijl Uilenspiegel.

=== Museums ===
There are three museums in Germany featuring Till Eulenspiegel. One is located in the town of Schöppenstedt in Lower Saxony, which is nearby his assumed birthplace Kneitlingen. The second is located in the supposed place of his death, the city of Mölln in Schleswig-Holstein, and the third in Bernburg (Saale), Sachsen-Anhalt. In the town of Damme, Belgium, there is also a museum honoring him, and there is a fountain and statue featuring Till Eulenspiegel in the Marktplatz of Magdeburg, capital city of Sachsen-Anhalt.

=== Hospitality ===
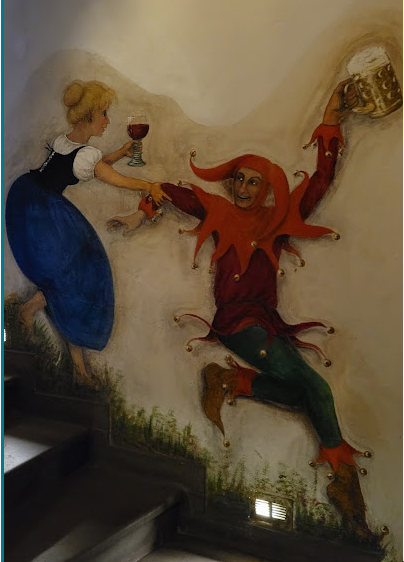
Mural leading down to the beer cellar of the Till Eulenspiegel Hotel, Würzburg.

The Till Eulenspiegel Hotel in Würzburg also operates a beer cellar and wine bar. There are many paintings, murals, and other things attributed to Eulenspiegel throughout the hotel and cellar.

The Zum Eulenspiegel is bar and restaurant located in Salzburg near the Stadtorr and Altes Rathaus.

=== Other ===
TES, the first BDSM organization founded in the United States, formerly known as The Eulenspiegel Society, took its original name from Till Eulenspiegel. TES was founded in 1971 and had the name "The Eulenspiegel Society" until it formally changed its name to "TES" in 2002. The original name was inspired by a passage from Austrian psychoanalyst Theodor Reik's Masochism in Modern Man (1941), in which he argues that patients who engage in self-punishing or provocative behavior do so in order to demonstrate their emotional fortitude, induce guilt in others, and achieve a sense of "victory through defeat". Reik describes Till Eulenspiegel's "peculiar" behavior—he enjoys walking uphill, and feels "dejected" walking downhill—and compares it to a "paradox reminiscent of masochism", because Till Eulenspiegel "gladly submits to discomfort, enjoys it, even transforms it into pleasure".

== See also ==
- Hershele Ostropoler
- Nasreddin
- Sly Peter
- Akhu Tönpa
- Reynard the Fox
- Petrica Kerempuh, a similar character in Croatian literature
- Charles De Coster, (1827 – 1879) one of the authors who rewrote some of the Till Eulenspiegel stories.
  - "The Legend of Thyl Ulenspiegel and Lamme Goedzak" by Charles De Coster
- Erich Kästner (1899–1974), another of the authors who rewrote some of the Till Eulenspiegel stories.
