= Les Aventures de Till L'Espiègle =

1956 film

- Directed by: Gérard Philipe; Joris Ivens
- Starring: Gérard Philipe; Nicole Berger
- Release date: 1956
- Running time: 102 minutes
- Countries: GDR, France
- Language: French
- Box office: 2,304,114 admissions (France)

Les Aventures de Till L'Espiègle is a French-East German film, based on The Legend of Thyl Ulenspiegel and Lamme Goedzak. It was released in 1956.

== Cast ==
- Gérard Philipe: Till Eulenspiegel
- Jean Vilar: The Duke of Alva
- Fernand Ledoux: Claes
- Nicole Berger: Nele
- Jean Carmet: Lamme Goedzak
- Jean Debucourt: The cardinal.
- Erwin Geschonneck: Bras d'Acier
- Wilhelm Koch-Hooge: William the Silent
- Elfriede Florin: Soetkin
