= Till Eulenspiegel (Karetnikov) =

Till Eulenspiegel (Russian: Тиль Уленшпигель) is a Russian-language opera (composed 1983, premiere 1993) by the Soviet composer Nikolai Karetnikov. The libretto is by film director Pavel Lungin, based on Charles De Coster's French novel The Legend of Thyl Ulenspiegel and Lamme Goedzak.

== History ==
With no opportunity for performance, the opera was built up from samizdat tape recording sessions, and received its premiere in Germany (Bielefeld Opera, 1993) after the end of the Soviet Union.

== Composition ==
The opera is a twelve-tone composition. The Till Eulenspiegel story had previously been set by several composers, including a Flemish setting by J. De Winter, and a German-language opera by Emil von Reznicek.
