= Symphony No. 4 (Karetnikov) =

1963 composition by Nikolai Karetnikov

The Symphony No. 4, Op. 17 was the fourth of six symphonies by Russian composer Nikolai Karetnikov. It was composed in 1963 at the age of 33, and premiered in Brno in 1967 during the Prague Spring International Music Festival. It received its Western premiere on 29 March 1994, 7 months before Karetnikov's death, in London's Barbican Hall by the BBC Symphony Orchestra conducted by Alexander Lazarev.

One of the most adventurous Soviet symphonic works in the 1960s, it is a bleak single-movement dodecaphonic symphony structured into five continuous sections lasting for c. 25 minutes, and it has been compared with the music of Roberto Gerhard and Roger Sessions. Karetnikov said the symphony was written under the impression of his personal tragedy and the end of Khrushchev thaw. He spoke of an internal programme derived from Sophocles' tragedy Oedipus Rex.
