= Robert en Bertrand =

Belgian comics series (1972-1993)

- Cover to album 14, De Spookhond
- Author(s): Willy Vandersteen, Marck Meul, Jacques Bakker
- Illustrator(s): Willy Vandersteen, Ron Van Riet
- Current status/schedule: Discontinued
- Launch date: 1972
- End date: 1993
- Publisher: Standaard Uitgeverij
- Genre(s): Adventure, Historical comics
- Original language: Dutch

Robert en Bertrand ("Robert and Bertrand") is a Flemish comic strip series set during the 19th century, in the Low Countries and France. The comic series was created by cartoonist Willy Vandersteen, known for the Suske en Wiske (Spike and Suzy) series.

Vandersteen drew inspiration from the main characters in a 19th-century play written by Benjamin Antier and Fréderick Lémaître and from the novels of the same name by Koen Ravestein.

== Setting ==
Title characters, Bertrand (l) and Robert (r)

The main characters are two vagrants, but later evolve into useful crooks. They are often chased by a cop/detective ("Number 17") who tries to charge them with vagrancy. Other characters include Joeki and Evelyne. During their wanderings, the sympathetic vagrants always help anyone who needs them, even the occasional Number 17 when needed for safety.

The series, which did not shy away from fantasy and a humorous note, remained realistic and socially critical. During the late 1980s, early 1990s, with illustrator Ronald van Riet and scriptwriter Marck Meul, Robert and Bertrand were back in their country of origin: France, with drawings in an Art Nouveau style. New characters made their appearance.

=== Anachronisms ===
Although Robert and Bertrand's stories are mainly set in the 19th century, no specific period is mentioned. Thus, the album Secret Document may involve the duo in the Franco-German War of 1870–1871, and the later album The Hell of Solferino in the Battle of Solferino in 1859. The album The Icarii refers to the first aeroplanes, making this story set in the early 20th century.

Although the historical events in the stories are fairly correctly depicted - as mentioned, the Battle of Solferino - elements do pop up that do not belong in the chosen era. For instance, cars appear in the aforementioned albums when they did not yet exist.

Other anachronisms aim for a humorous effect - a cameo by a young Eddy Merckx or the reference to the book Bartje, which "has yet to be written".

== Publication history ==
Willy Vandersteen produced sixty-five albums from 1972. Vandersteen also wrote the screenplay and pencil drawings for the 66th story. From 1985 Vandersteen concentrated more on "De Geuzen", and illustrator Ron Van Riet took over the series, with scripts by Marck Meul (with the exception of album 72 and 74 by author Jacques Bakker). The drawing style became less caricatural and semi-realistic.

The series was pre-published in De Standaard from 30 November 1972 to 6 July 1992, publishing an average of four albums a year. The small but enthusiastic fan base could not stop the series being discontinued in 1993. Zilvertand was the last album. 47 titles were translated in French.

From 2021, the stories were bundled in a series of omnibus editions, released in Belgium and the Netherlands

== Albums ==
- 1. Mysterie op Rozendael, 1973
- 2. Het opgejaagde weeskind, 1973
- 3. De nabjar van Poenjab, 1974
- 4. De levende brug, 1974
- 5. De rode herberg, 1974
- 6. Het zwarte land, 1974
- 7. De toverlantaarn, 1974
- 8. De weerwolf, 1975
- 9. Het zilveren raadsel, 1975
- 10. De kwade hand, 1975
- 11. De groene draak, 1975
- 12. Zwarte Mie de orgeldraaister, 1975
- 13. Geheim document, 1976
- 14. De spookhond, 1975
- 15. De stakingbreker, 1976
- 16. Het geheim van Flodderzee, 1976
- 17. Avontuur in Moldavië, 1976
- 18. De rode kaproen, 1977
- 19. De duistere machten, 1977
- 20. Jacht op de sperwer, 1977
- 21. De ramp van Corvilain, 1977
- 22. Spoken in het Zwin, 1977
- 23. Het spookhuis, 1978
- 24. De gouden kinkhoorn, 1978
- 25. Vreemde bezoekers, 1978
- 26. De zwarte kat, 1978
- 27. De laatste bokkerijder, 1979
- 28. Het duel, 1979
- 29. De wolvenhoeve, 1979
- 30. De verdwenen fotografe, 1979
- 31. De schat van de tempeliers, 1980
- 32. De elfenjager, 1980
- 33. De geheime sekte, 1980
- 34. Het wrekende vuur, 1980
- 35. De hel van Solferino, 1980
- 36. Het raadsel Zarata, 1980
- 37. De geheimen van de Mont Blanc, 1980
- 38. De Titanen, 1980
- 39. Fantoom op spoor zeven, 1981
- 40. De vliegende Hollander, 1981
- 41. De dochters van de zon, 1981
- 42. De demon van Paracelse, 1981
- 43. Het stervende huis, 1981
- 44. De witte wolf, 1982
- 45. Drama in de Orient-Express, 1982
- 46. De helderziende, 1982
- 47. De ijzeren helm, 1982
- 48. Als de raven sterven, 1982
- 49. De gouden hand, 1983
- 50. De wraak van Zabor, 1983
- 51. Verschijningen, 1983
- 52. De eenhoorn, 1983
- 53. Het grote raadsel 1, 1983
- 54. Het grote raadsel II, 1983
- 55. Vlucht naar Rochamps, 1984
- 56. Het spiegelbeeld, 1984
- 57. De vloek van Hyavar, 1984
- 58. De magische handen, 1984
- 59. Gevaarlijke mummies, 1984
- 60. De Doodsbode, 1984
- 61. Offers voor Drosera 1, 1985
- 62. Offers voor Drosera 2, 1985
- 63. De Vondeling, 1985
- 64. Paniek in Saltshire, 1985
- 65. De Hotelrat, 1985
- 66. De Vleermuis, 1985
- 67. Jacht op nr 17, 1985
- 68. De Apache, 1985
- 69. Madame Sarah, 1986
- 70. De hel van Montparnasse, 1986
- 71. Het Spiegelgenootschap, 1986
- 72. De Friese Elfstedentocht, 1986
- 73. De komeet en het beest, 1987
- 74. Een toren voor Parijs, 1987
- 75. Vogelvrij, 1987
- 76. Leonardo, 1987
- 77. Tranen voor een clown, 1987
- 78. De Icarii, 1988
- 79. Mannen van ijzer, 1988
- 80. De drie neuzen, 1988
- 81. De Witte ruiters, 1988
- 82. De scharlaken dood, 1989
- 83. De klauw van de mol, 1989
- 84. De plaggenstekers, 1989
- 85. Palingoproer, 1989
- 86. Het laaiend vuur, 1990
- 87. Leer om leer, 1990
- 88. Het Congocontract, 1990
- 89. De terugkeer van Leonardo, 1991
- 90. De val van de Feniks, 1991
- 91. De monsterman, 1991
- 92. Prins Joeki, 1991
- 93. De gouden poort, 1992
- 94. Het holle huis, 1992
- 95. Het wolvejong, 1992
- 96. De tinnen soldaatjes, 1992
- 97. Ster nummer 17, 1993
- 98. Zilvertand, 1993

== See also ==
• Ligne claire

• Belgian comics

• Franco-Belgian comics
