= Bessy (comics) =

Belgian comic series

- Cover of album nr. 16, Het Teken van de Grote Geest
- Author(s): Willy Vandersteen, Karel Verschuere
- Current status/schedule: Discontinued
- Launch date: 24 December 1952.
- End date: 1997
- Syndicate(s): Standaard Uitgeverij
- Genre(s): Action, Adventure, Western

Bessy was a long-running Belgian comics series created by Willy Vandersteen and Karel Verschuere in 1952. Together with Suske en Wiske and De Rode Ridder it was once one of his most popular and best-selling series, with successful translations in Dutch, French, German and Swedish. It was terminated in 1997.

== Concept ==
Inspired by the success of Lassie, Willy Vandersteen and Karel Verschuere decided to make a comic strip series about a female collie. Contrary to the original Lassie series, though, it did not feature any child characters and was set in the Wild West rather than the present time. Bessy was given an owner, Andy Cayoon, with whom she had many adventures involving cowboys and Native Americans.

== Publication history ==
Bessy was first published in the French-language Belgian newspaper La Libre Belgique on December 24, 1952, and translated into Dutch a year later, when the comics were published in De Standaard and De Katholieke Illustratie. The series were also a tremendous success in Germany, where they were published in the youth magazines Pony and Felix. So much in fact, that Vandersteen's studio had a separate team drawing new titles, many of which were never published in Dutch. With 992 different titles, reissues included, Bessy has the most album titles of all of Vandersteen's series. 164 albums of these were Dutch, 151 were French. The German "Bessy" series counted 992 issues. The series was also published in Sweden under the name Bessie, which spawned 92 albums.

The high production unfortunately also had an effect on the quality of the stories and drawings. As a result, the German editions were discontinued by 1985. One of Vandersteen's assistants, Jeff Broeckx, then created a reboot Bessy Natuurkommando ("Bessy Nature Commando") (1984-1992), where Andy and Bessy were reimagined as present-day conservators of animals and nature. Andy received a love interest, Aneka, and a little street boy named Kid, who travelled along with them on their missions. The scripts were written by Marck Meul. Twenty-three albums were drawn before the series was terminated in 1992. Broeckx tried a new reboot and redrew the first seven stories of the original series, as well as the twelfth story from the first series. By 1997 the series came to a definite halt.

== Albums ==
=== Original series ===
1. Het geheim van Rainy Lake (1954)
2. De laatste diligence (1954)
3. Het geheimzinnige spoor (1954)
4. De pioniers (1954)
5. Het stalen ros (1955)
6. De schrik van Robson Rockies (1955)
7. Wapiti Canyon (1955)
8. De angst van Bessy (1955)
9. Het gevaarlijke konvooi (1955)
10. De spookhengst (1956)
11. De zwarte prins (1956)
12. De zwijgende getuige (1956)
13. De klopjacht (1956)
14. De gevangene der Witchinoks (1956)
15. De wraak der Tecontas (1957)
16. Het teken van de Grote Geest (1957)
17. De verboden jacht (1957)
18. De weerwraak (1957)
19. De koning van de nacht (1957)
20. De hongersnood (1957)
21. Het laatste hertejong (1957)
22. De gouden vlinders (1957)
23. De weddenschap (1958)
24. De geheime lading (1958)
25. De spookstad (1958)
26. De verborgen buit (1958)
27. Het dodende dal (1958)
28. De onbekenden (1959)
29. Onrust in Redskin City (1959)
30. De witte bever (1959)
31. De huilende rotsen (1959)
32. De vluchteling (1960)
33. De voorspelling (1960)
34. De strijdbijl (1960)
35. De drie pijlen (1960)
36. De verdwaalden (1961)
37. De hinderlaag (1961)
38. De vuurproef (1961)
39. De noodlottige tocht (1961)
40. De dans der slangen (1962)
41. De Pony Express (1962)
42. De hut der geesten (1962)
43. Rex, de wilde hond (1962)
44. Barry, de ontembare (1962)
45. De gijzelaars (1962)
46. Witte Bliksem (1963)
47. De grijze wagen (1963)
48. De heilige vlam (1963)
49. De reddende boodschap (1963)
50. De zwarte horde (1963)
51. Paniek in Watona (1964)
52. De kluizenaar (1964)
53. De vlucht (1964)
54. Moh-Wapi de gids (1964)
55. Het zilverspoor (1964)
56. De rode grot (1965)
57. De dorre vlakte (1965)
58. Op erewoord (1965)
59. De vallei der eekhoorns (1965)
60. De zwarte scalp (1965)
61. De vuurdans (1966)
62. De vallei der geesten (1966)
63. Het losgeld (1966)
64. De ongewensten (1966)
65. De bizondoder (1966)
66. Het zingende zand (1966)
67. De verlaten ranch (1966)
68. De duivenjagers (1966)
69. Ponca-Ponca, de hondengod (1968)
70. Het heilige paard (1968)
71. De verdwijning van Edelhert (1968)
72. De grote trek (1968)
73. De muiters (1969)
74. Het onzichtbare wapen (1969)
75. Bessy's vreemde vriend (1969)
76. Ajax, de dobberman (1969)
77. De ongenode gast (1969)
78. Offer aan de nacht (1969)
79. De wreker (1969)
80. Het hol van Krotax (1970)
81. Het wagengeweer (1970)
82. Sheriff in nood (1970)
83. De hel in het drijfzand (1970)
84. Het geheim van Rhawik (1970)
85. Drie vlechten (1971)
86. De Californio (1971)
87. De adem der geesten (1971)
88. De bron (1971)
89. De overstroming (1971)
90. De ontvoering van Tali-Ya (1971)
91. Corvo de raaf (1972)
92. De hertenjagers (1972)
93. De eenzame bizon (1972)
94. Het verborgen wapen (1972)
95. De vakman (1972)
96. Kwang, de bergbever (1972)
97. De Pratt-school (1972)
98. De degen der vrede (1972)
99. De squatters (1972)
100. Vogelvrij (1972)
101. Diamond-R (1973)
102. Kid, de Apache (1973)
103. De ramp van Miles City (1973)
104. Mike Defflings goud (1973)
105. De beverdam (1973)
106. Klinga van de Lynxen (1973)
107. De blanke Sjamaan (1973)
108. Het fantoom van de Duivelsmesa (1973)
109. De schoolmeester (1974)
110. Murphi, de reus (1974)
111. De vossenfarm (1974)
112. De Papagokalender (1974)
113. Bij de ivoorjagers (1974)
114. De opgejaagden (1975)
115. De hagedisseneters (1975)
116. De berglopers (1975)
117. De grote blanke vader (1975)
118. De Greenhorns (1976)
119. Edelherts eer (1976)
120. Het brandende water (1976)
121. De Texaan (1976)
122. De spooktrein (1977)
123. Lobo en Blanca (1977)
124. De uittocht (1977)
125. Zarak, de rode poema (1977)
126. Barry, de kleine wolf (1977)
127. Ondergang in de grot (1978)
128. De ontsnapte (1978)
129. De wereld van de duisternis (1978)
130. Wie is mijn moordenaar (1978)
131. De verdwaalden (1978)
132. De wraak der woestijn (1979)
133. De keuze (1979)
134. De gouden rots (1979)
135. Het gebied van de Orscha (1979)
136. Tragedie van de kustindianen (1979)
137. In het spoor van de eland (1980)
138. Otterstaart en zijn vriend de otter (1980)
139. De karavaan (1980)
140. Muiterij (1980)
141. Vlucht door de hel (1980)
142. De getuige (1981)
143. De duivelsdans (1981)
144. De verdwenen kudde (1981)
145. De ongewenste spoorlijn (1981)
146. De gevangene van Fort North Point (1981)
147. Bestorming over Red River Town (1982)
148. Het vreemde S.O.S.-bericht (1982)
149. De wraak van de poema (1982)
150. Vlucht van Kleine Eenhoorn (1982)
151. Golo (1982)
152. De alligator-poel (1983)
153. Ontmoeting met Kleine Bever (1983)
154. Pioniers voor Picket-City (1983)
155. De gemaskerde ruiter met het flitsende paard (1983)
156. Het geheim van het reizende circus (1983)
157. Illegale paardenhandel (1984)
158. Het gekwetste paard (1984)
159. De talisman (1984)
160. De zeehonden (1984)
161. De snelle ruiter (1984)
162. Raaf, een moedige Cayuse-jongen (1985)
163. Edelherts visioen (1985)
164. Voor de redding van de sachem (1985)

=== Bessy Natuurcommando ===
1. De rubberjagers (1985)
2. Het verboden eiland(1986)
3. De nacht van de schildpad (1986)
4. Digit (1986)
5. Dian (1987)
6. Club caribbean (1987)
7. Gebroken pijl (1987)
8. Water (1987)
9. De wilde jager (1987)
10. Olie op de golven (1988)
11. Bij nacht en ontij (1988)
12. De nacht van de ooievaar (1988)
13. El condor pasa (1988)
14. De gevleugelde plaag (1989)
15. De loonslaven (1989)
16. Doodsgoud (1989)
17. Sporen in de sneeuw (1989)
18. De heren van het woud (1990)
19. Met huid en haar (1990)
20. Apsara (1990)
21. Het wolvendorp (1991)
22. De jungle van Manhattan (1991)
23. De mijn (1992)

=== N series ===
1. De pioniers (1991)
2. Het geheim van Rainy Lake (1992)
3. De laatste diligence (1992)
4. Het geheimzinnige spoor (1993)
5. Het stalen ros (1994)
6. De schrik van Robson Rockies (1994)
7. Wapiti Canyon (1995)
8. De zwijgende getuige (1997)

== See also ==
• Ligne claire
