= Hermann Bote =

Hermann Bote (also Hermen Bote, c. 1450 – c. 1520) was a Middle Low German author and chronicler.

== Life ==
A native of Braunschweig, he served as a city scribe for octroi (tariffs) in that city from 1488. In that year, in the context of a popular rebellion in Braunschweig, he composed a number of satirical poems against city councillor Ludeke Hollant. After a period of exile, he appears as the keeper of the city wine cellar during 1493–1496, and in 1497 was re-introduced to his former function of city scribe. Renewed political unrest in 1513 resulted in his losing his office once again and being arrested. He was condemned to death, but the sentence was converted to house arrest at the last minute. In 1516 he is recorded as manager of the city brickyard.

== Literary production ==
Bote is the author of Boek van veleme rade (1491), a description of the feudal order of the day. His chronicle, known as the Braunschweiger Weltchronik, covers the period from 1444 to 1516. Reynke de vos, a Low German adaptation of the older "Reynard" material printed in Lübeck in 1498, is sometimes attributed to Bote. In 1503, he published a Zollbuch, dealing with tariffs. In 1514, he published Schichtbuch (Schicht being the local term for revolt or civil unrest), including both earlier revolts and the revolt of 1487–1489 he had himself been involved in. Attached to the chronicle is a brief description of the churches, monasteries and chapels in Braunschweig and a Wappenbuch. In 1517, Bote published a collections of aphorisms under the title De Köker. In 1518, he published a revised chronicle, known as the Hannoversche Weltchronik. His latest known publication is a satirical poem on the Hildesheim Diocesan Feud, written in 1519.

Bote has also been suggested as the author of the first printed chapbook on Till Eulenspiegel, printed in 1510 under the title of Ein kurtzweilig Lesen von Dil Ulenspiegel geboren uß dem Land zu Brunßwick. This publication, extremely successful in the course of the 16th century, was signed by its author only with "N." Authorship of Bote was suggested due to the acrostic ERMAN B being formed by the initials of chapters 90 to 95.
