= 't Prinske =

Flemish comic strip

De avonturen van ‘t Prinske
- Cover of album 3, released in 1996

Publication information
- Publisher: De Dageraad, Standaard Uitgeverij
- Genre: Gag cartoon

Creative team
- Created by: Willy Vandersteen
- Written by: Willy Vandersteen

't Prinske is a Flemish comic book series created and drawn by Willy Vandersteen. It is Vandersteen's second gag series.

The strip appeared in the Tintin weekly from December 1953 to October 1959. A total of 14 front plates, 10 stories, and many gags were published. These were all released as comic books.

The comic revolves around the adventures of a young prince and his butler.

== Albums ==
Two albums were published by publisher De Dageraad in the Magnum collection.

1. 't Prinske (1978)
2. 't Prinske 2nd series (1980)

Later four more albums were published by Standaard Uitgeverij.

1. Part 1 (1994)
2. Part 2 (1995)
3. Part 3 (1996)
4. Part 4 (1997)
