= The Legend of Thyl Ulenspiegel and Lamme Goedzak =

1867 novel by Charles De Coster

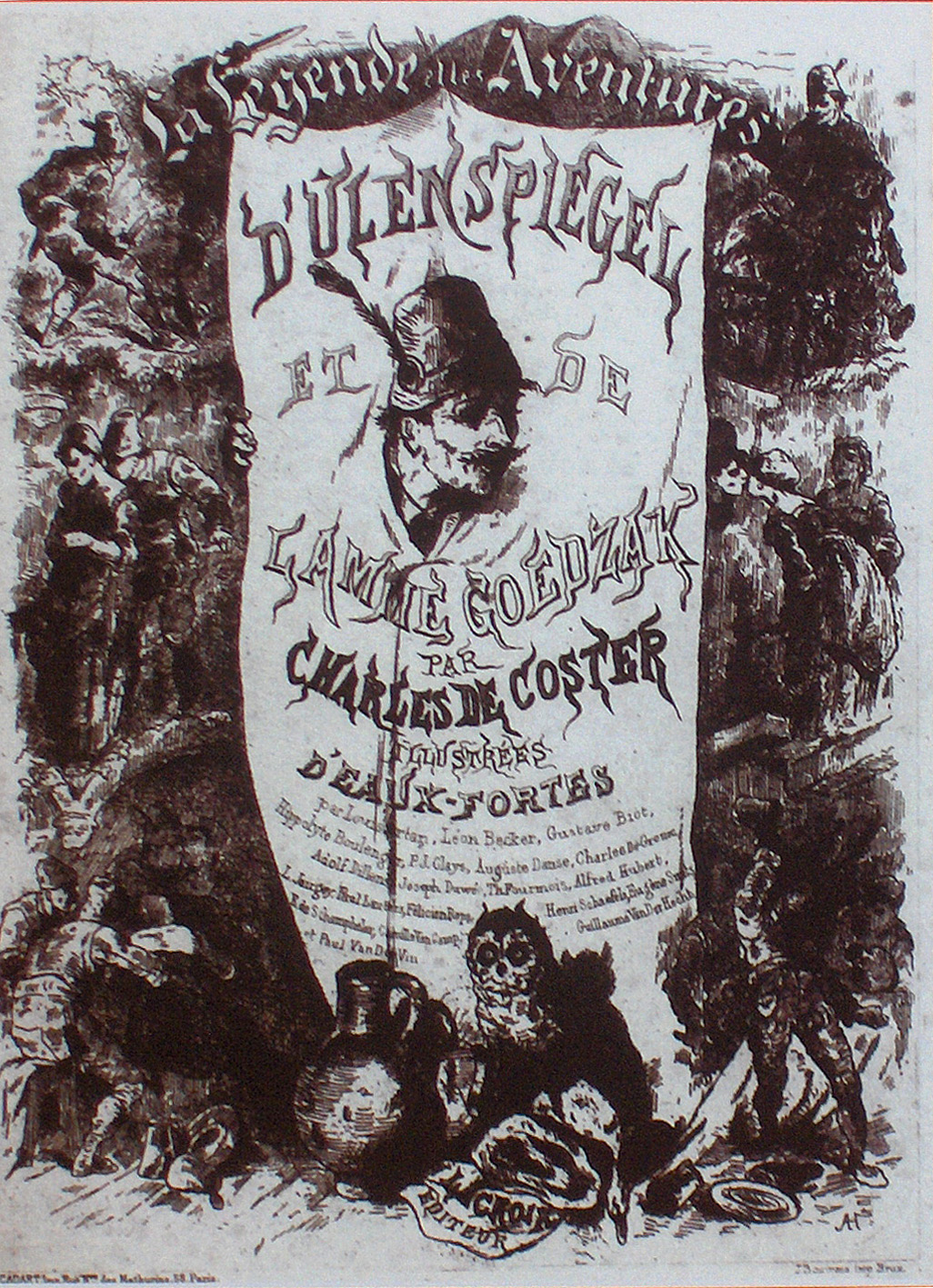
- Frontispiece of 1869 edition
- Author: Charles De Coster
- Original title: La Légende et les Aventures héroïques, joyeuses et glorieuses d'Ulenspiegel et de Lamme Goedzak au pays de Flandres et ailleurs
- Translator: Geoffrey Whitworth; F. M. Atkinson; John Hero Lepper
- Illustrator: Albert Delstanche; Frans Masereel
- Language: French
- Genre: historical fiction
- Set in: Spanish Netherlands, 16th century
- Published: December 1867
- Publisher: Librairie Internationale
- Publication place: Belgium
- Media type: Print: hardback
- Pages: 480
- Dewey Decimal: 848.8
- LC Class: PQ2211.C4 L345
- Original text: La Légende et les Aventures héroïques, joyeuses et glorieuses d'Ulenspiegel et de Lamme Goedzak au pays de Flandres et ailleurs at French Wikisource

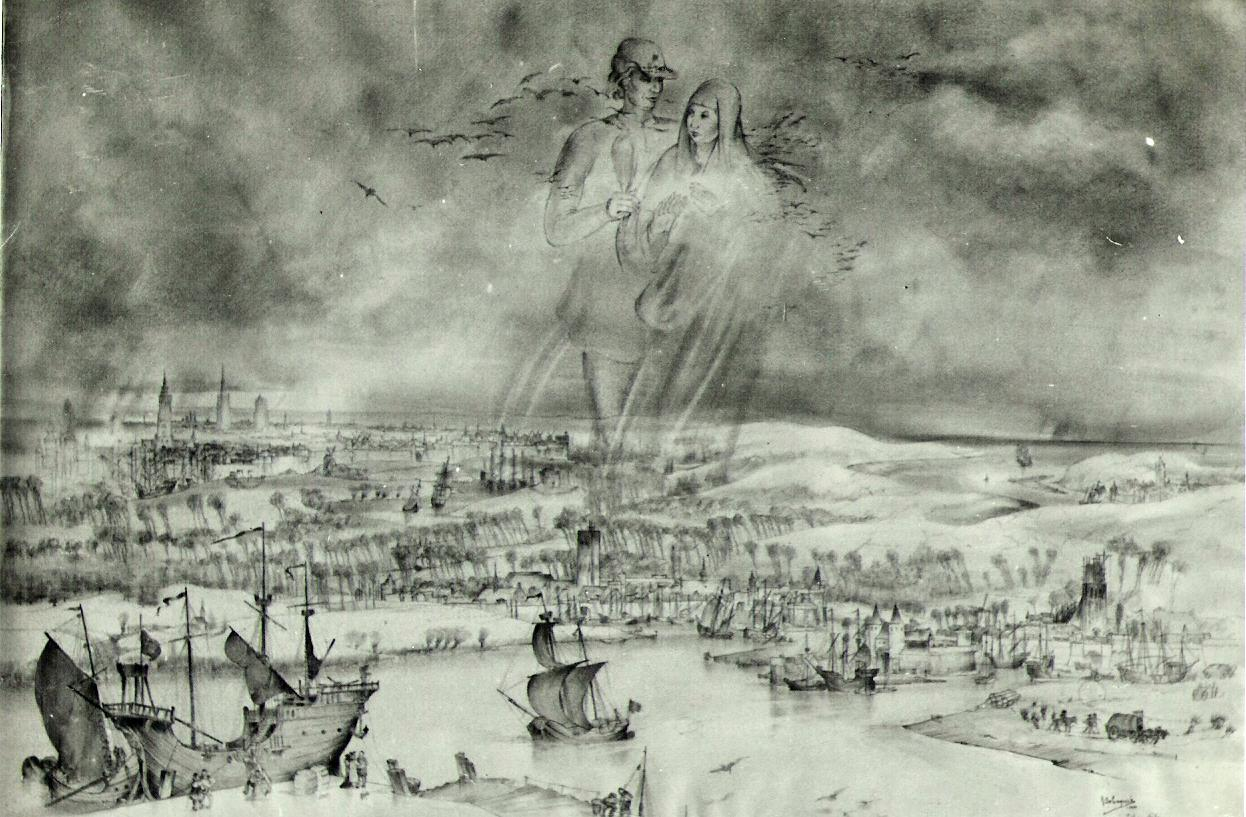
"Thyl Ulenspiegel and Nele in Flanders" pen drawing by the Belgian artist René De Coninck (1907–1978)

The Legend of Thyl Ulenspiegel and Lamme Goedzak (French: La Légende et les Aventures héroïques, joyeuses et glorieuses d'Ulenspiegel et de Lamme Goedzak au pays de Flandres et ailleurs, "The Legend and the Heroic, Joyous and Glorious Adventures of Ulenspiegel and Lamme Goedzak in the land of Flanders and elsewhere") is an 1867 French-language novel by Belgian author Charles De Coster. Based on the Low German literary figure Till Eulenspiegel, Coster's novel recounts the allegorical adventures as those of a Flemish prankster, Thyl Ulenspiegel, directly before and during the Dutch Revolt against Spanish rule in the Netherlands.

== Background history ==
De Coster was one of many 19th-century nationalist writers who made use of – and considerably adapted and changed – pre-existing folk tales. (Prominent others of this kind include the German Grimm Brothers and the Finnish Elias Lönnrot). In this case, Thyl Ulenspiegel — whose adventures were first written of in 1510 and were set in 14th-century Lower Saxony — is moved westwards in space and forward in time, and made into a Protestant hero of the time of the Dutch War of Independence.

De Coster incorporated in his book many of the original amusing Ulenspiegel tales, side by side with far from funny material - for example, graphic depictions of tortures by the inquisition and auto de fe. As depicted by De Coster, Ulenspiegel carries in a locket around his neck the ashes of his father, burned at the stake outside of the walls of the city on charges of heresy – a feature never hinted at in any of the original folk tales. This experience begins Ulenspiegel's transformation from idle prankster to hero of the Dutch Revolt.

The novel was later illustrated with a series of linocuts by Frans Masereel, the foremost Belgian modernist painter and engraver.

== Plot ==
De Coster gives Thyl a girlfriend, Nele, and a best friend, Lamme Goedzak, who functions as a comedic sidekick - both of whom are not attested in the original folktales (Lamme Goedzak is clearly modeled on Sancho Panza, Don Quixote's companion). The novel follows many historic events in the Eighty Years' War.

Thyl Uilenspiegel is born in Damme, Flanders as son of the charcoal burner Claes and his wife Soetkin. He is brought into this world on the same birthday as Philip II of Spain. As a child Thyl already exhibits the naughty behaviour he will become infamous for as an adult. As a youth, he is several times apprenticed to various craftsmen, but never remains long with any of them - especially due to his habit of taking commands literally, with hilarious and sometimes disastrous results. In all, he does not take up any regular profession, but rather spends his time playing tricks and practical jokes, particularly on especially corrupt Catholic priests.

Meanwhile, Uilenspiegel's Flanders suffers increasing oppression as Emperor Charles V launches an intensive campaign to root out the Protestant "heresy". Uilenspiegel himself is caught out, having incautiously expressed in public the opinion that masses said for the dead benefit no one but the clergy paid for saying them. Due to his youth he gets off with a relatively light punishment - he is sentenced to three years' exile and must get a pardon from the Pope in Rome. Thereupon, he embarks on a meandering route through the Low Countries and the German Holy Roman Empire, perpetrating his tricks and practical jokes wherever he goes. Sometimes he indulges in elaborate confidence tricks, for example getting Jewish and Gentile merchants in Hamburg to pay him considerable sums for supposed magical amulets which are in fact made of animal excrement. Uilenspiegel's love for his sweetheart Nele, whom he left behind, does not prevent him from dallying with every attractive woman he meets. One of his fleeting sexual encounters is mentioned as resulting in the birth of a German bastard, who would be named Ulenspiegel and whose own tricks would in later times be confused with those of his sire. In many places along the way, Uilenspiegel manages to gain free board and lodging by the simple expedient of shamelessly flattering the beauty of female innkeepers. Eventually, he gets to Rome and obtains the required Papal pardon, through a combination of an Uilenspiegel trick played on the Pope in person and a bribe paid into the Catholic Church's coffers.

Thereupon, Uilenspiegel returns from exile - to find a grim and tragic situation at home. His father Claes had been arrested for his Lutheran sympathies, having been turned in by the family's odious neighbor - a fishmonger, who hoped to gain part of his victim's property under the Spanish policy of rewarding informers. Uilenspiegel's tricks are of no avail against the humorless and relentless Inquisition, and his father is duly declared a heretic and burned at the stake. Afterwards, Uilenspiegel himself and his mother, Soetkin, are arrested and tortured horribly in each other's presence, to make them reveal the location of Claes' hoard of coins - which is now legally the Emperor's property. They stand the torture, being determined to deny the fishmonger his "share" of the money - but soon afterwards the heartbroken Soetkin dies. Thyl collects his father's ashes and puts them in a bag he wears on his chest. From that moment on he is destined to fight back against the Spanish oppression.

Uilenspiegel does not entirely change his way of life. He still wanders the Low Countries, playing various tricks and practical jokes, and frequents the inns, low joints and brothels of cosmopolitan Antwerp - but now there is a grim purpose behind it all. Uilenspiegel has become an utterly devoted spy and agitator in the service of the growing Dutch Revolt. He attaches himself to William the Silent, the rebel leader, and performs for him many dangerous missions behind enemy lines, in the Spanish-occupied land. Traveling on the back of a donkey, or on boats and barges with rebel-minded crews ranging the country's canals and rivers, Uilenspiegel carries secret messages and letters. He provides funds and instructions to the underground network of hidden rebels, who conduct secret Protestant preaching at night, publish and disseminate Protestant Bibles and revolutionary tracts, and produce arms and ammunition for the rebels. In secret gatherings, Uilenspiegel sings songs he had composed himself, calling the people to arms against the cruel Spanish governor, The Duke of Alva.

With the revolt having been blocked on land, Uilenspiegel and his companions turn to the sea and join the rebel fleet of the Sea Beggars (Geuzen), where Uilenspiegel is eventually promoted to become the captain of a ship. He exults with the growing success of the revolt, following the Capture of Brielle in 1572. Despite his bitter grudge against the Catholic Church, he is strongly opposed to the summary execution of nineteen captured Catholic clergy and makes a great effort to save them - which nearly results in his being hanged himself by an irritable rebel commander. Uilenspiegel is saved by the loyal Nele, whose willingness to marry him there and then under the gallows secures his pardon under an ancient law. Thereafter, Thyl and Nele sail together in the rebel fleet, and he seems to be completely faithful to her.

Eventually, the Dutch Republic emerges effectively free from the oppressive Spanish rule - but the Eighty Years War would drag on long past Uilenspiegel's lifetime. Moreover, Uilenspiegel's own beloved Flanders is doomed to remain under Spanish rule and Catholic Church dominance for centuries to come. Uilenspiegel rails against the half-hearted - or altogether traitorous - Flemish aristocrats, who in his view brought about this sad result. No longer young, Thyl and Nele are assigned a guard tower on what has become the border with the Spanish-occupied land, from there to sound an alarm should they see enemy troops approaching.

At the book's conclusion, Thyl and Nele experience at night a magical vision, with mythical beings uttering to them a prophecy about a future time of reconciliation between North and South (i.e. what would become The Netherlands and Belgium). In the aftermath, Uilenspiegel lies cold and unmoving, as if dead. The grieving Nele gets him buried, and a Catholic priest gloats "Uilenspiegel, the Great Geuze, is dead!" when suddenly the sandy grave is heaving, and Uilenspiegel emerges alive and hale. The priest flees in panic, while Thyl and Nele depart singing to yet further adventures.

== Fantasy elements ==
While most of the book is laid against the concrete historical background of 16th Century society - often depicted in its most earthy and ribald aspects - the plot includes some aspects of fantasy. In babyhood Thyl needs a wet nurse, since his mother is unable to feed him. This service is provided by a neighbor who happens to be a witch with actual, manifest magic powers - a white witch who never uses her powers to harm others. The witch' daughter Nelle, Thyl's contemporary who would grow up to be his beloved and eventually his wife, shares in her mother's powers. The main magical operation depicted in the book is the ability to engage in Astral journeys far and wide. Nelle is able to magically eavesdrop on a very private conversation between Emperor Charles V and his son and heir Philip II; she is able to go up to Heaven and see judgement passed on the souls of Thyl's father Claes, burned by the Inquisition, and of the same Emperor Charles who on the same day died of overeating; and later Nelle gets Thyl to accompany her on voyages to magical realms where they see various fantastic beings and have allegorical visions (which actually convey De Coster's political ideas).

It is noteworthy that in the Heaven depicted in the book, the Virgin Mary has a major role - seated at the side of her son Jesus as he passes judgement on the souls of recently deceased people, and trying to temper his severity with her pity and compassion. That accords with the role given to Mary in Catholic theology, while Protestants have tended to greatly diminish her importance. Yet, ironically, in this "Catholic" Heaven the Protestant heretic Claes is welcomed and goes to Paradise, while the staunchly Catholic Emperor is condemned to Hell - his punishment being that whenever a victim is tortured by the Inquisition, the Emperor in his afterlife will feel the pain.

== The Werewolf Murders ==
Embedded in the book are several chapters constituting, in effect, a Murder Mystery - a literary form not yet recognized as a distinct genre at the time of writing. Damme, Thyl Ulenspiegel's hometown, is terrorized by what seems a rampaging werewolf. People going abroad in the night - especially young women, but also others of all ages and genders - are discovered in the morning with their necks broken, bearing the clear mark of the bite of wolf's fangs. Even in their homes, people are not completely safe.

Hearing the news, Ulenspiegel takes a break from his struggle against the Spanish occupiers, determined to rid Damme of this dire peril. With little of his normal joking manner, he goes about, deadly serious, visiting crime scenes and gathering evidence. In fact anticipating some of the methods which would be used by Sherlock Holmes some decades later, Ulenspiegel quickly solves the mystery. While in other parts of the book supernatural beings are real and manifest, here the werewolf story turns out to be simply a red herring planted by a completely mundane perpetrator - a respectable baker by day who becomes a deranged serial killer by night. He had managed to transform an ordinary biscuit-making instrument into a vicious murder weapon by inserting two rows of vicious metal teeth, to emulate wolf's fangs.

The solution of this dark affair precipitates a delving into older unsolved mysteries - among them, that surrounding the birth of Nelle, Ulenspiegel's beloved. Since her mother never disclosed the identity of the father, and since the mother was widely reputed to be witch, malicious gossips often believed the poor Nelle to have been fathered by a demon. Here, too, the true story turns out to be completely mundane - and rather sordid.

== Adaptations ==
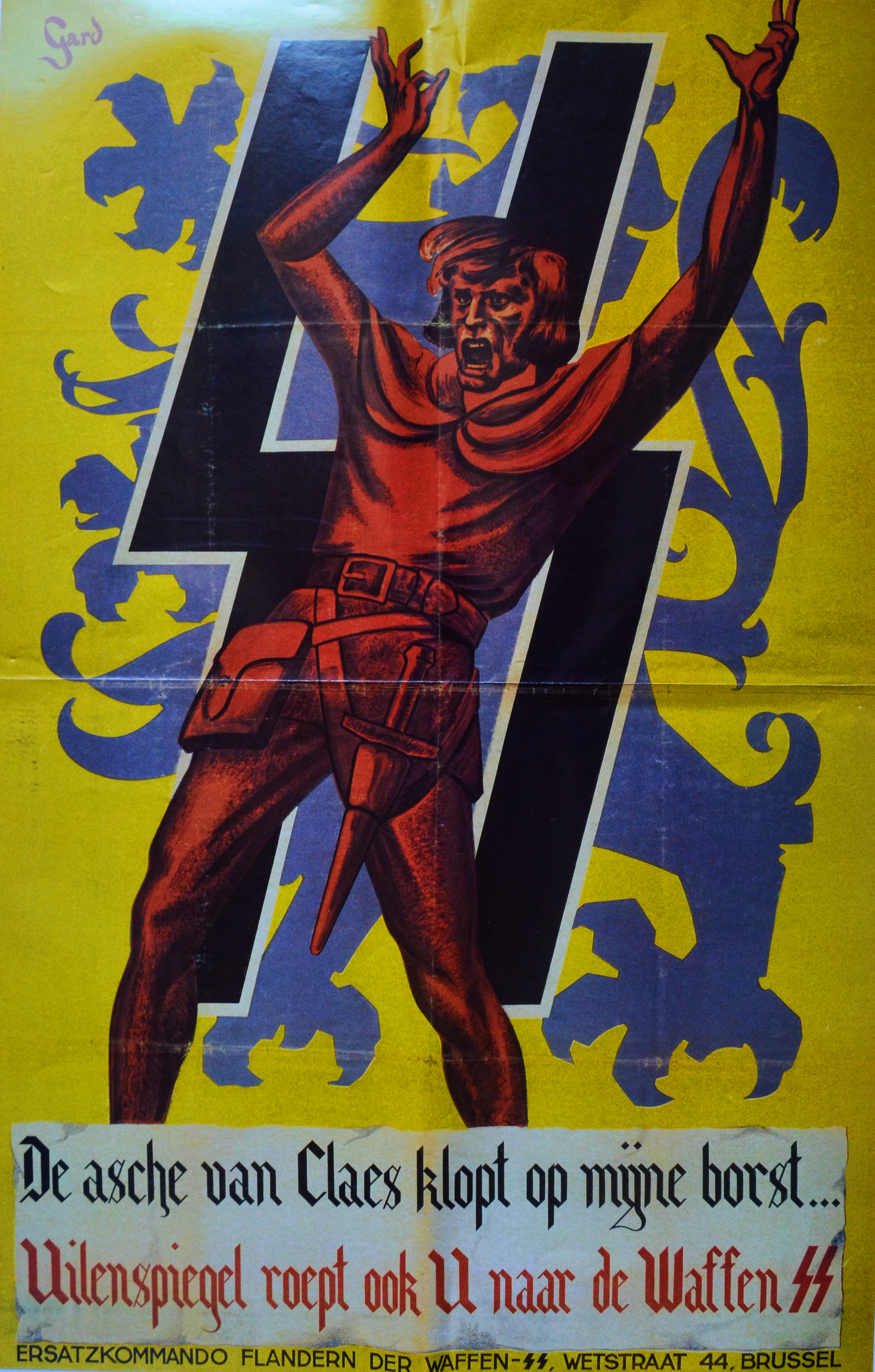
Propaganda poster of the 27th SS Volunteer Division Langemarck: "The ashes of Claes beat on my chest ... Ulenspiegel also calls you to the Waffen-SS!"

=== Comic book adaptations ===
In the 1940s Ray Goossens made a gag-a-day comic about Uilenspiegel and Lamme Goedzak. Willy Vandersteen drew two comic book albums about Uilenspiegel, "De Opstand der Geuzen" ("The Rebellion of the Geuzen") and "Fort Oranje" ("Fort Orange"), both drawn in a realistic, serious style and pre-published in the Belgian comics magazine Tintin between 1952 and 1954. They were published in comic book album format in 1954 and 1955. The stories were drawn in a realistic style and in some instances followed the original novel very closely, but sometimes followed his own imagination more. Dutch comics artist George van Raemdonck adapted the novel into a comic strip in 1964.

=== Film adaptations ===
A film based on the novel was filmed in 1956 with Gerard Philipe, directed by Joris Ivens and Gerard Philipe Les Aventures de Till L'Espiègle (English title: "Bold Adventure"). The film was a French-East German co-production.

A film based on the novel was filmed in the USSR by Aleksandr Alov and Vladimir Naumov, The Legend of Till Ullenspiegel (1976).

=== Literary adaptations ===
Ulenspiegel was mentioned in Mikhail Bulgakov's The Master and Margarita as a possible prototype for the black cat character Behemoth.

=== Musical adaptations ===
The German composer Walter Braunfels adapted De Coster's novel in 1910 for his second opera, the full-length Wagnerian epic Ulenspiegel, first performed at Stuttgart on 4 November 1913, revived in 2011 (Gera, Thuringia) and 2014 (EntArteOpera, Zürich - a production released on DVD in 2017 by the Capriccio record company).

Wladimir Vogel was a Russian composer who wrote a drama-oratorio Thyl Claes in the late 30s or early 40s, derived from De Coster's book.

The Soviet composer Nikolai Karetnikov and his librettist filmmaker Pavel Lungin adapted De Coster's novel as the samizdat opera Till Eulenspiegel (1983), which had to be recorded piece-by-piece in secret and received its premiere (1993) only after the Soviet Union collapsed.

Luigi Dallapiccola drew on the novel as one source for his opera Il Prigioniero.

== See also ==
- Cultural depictions of Philip II of Spain
