= Ulenspiegel (opera) =

1913 German opera by Walter Braunfels

- Opera by Walter Braunfels
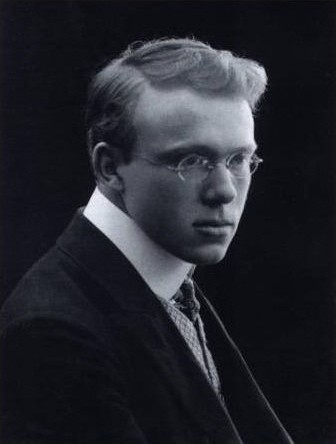
- Walter Braunfels in 1902
- Librettist: Braunfels
- Language: German
- Based on: The Legend of Thyl Ulenspiegel and Lamme Goedzak by Charles De Coster
- Premiere: 4 November 1913; Stuttgart Court Theatre

Ulenspiegel, Op. 23, is a German-language opera in three acts by Walter Braunfels to a libretto by the composer after Charles De Coster's The Legend of Thyl Ulenspiegel and Lamme Goedzak. It premiered in Stuttgart's Hoftheater on 4 November 1913.

Braunfels' work was considered degenerate music and banned during the Nazi era, and the first revival of Ulenspiegel took place 28 January 2011 in Gera. The scenery for this production was designed by architect Stephan Braunfels, the grandson of Walter Braunfels.

== Recording ==
- 2014: DVD – Marc Horus, Christa Ratzenböck, Joachim Goltz, Hans-Peter Scheidegger, Andreas Jankowitsch, Tomas Kovacic, Martin Summer, Saeyoung Park, Dimitrij Leonov, Neven Crnic, Mario Lerchenberger, Laszlo Kiss; EntArteOpera Choir, Israel Chamber Orchestra, Martin Sieghart; Roland Schwab (stage director); Capriccio C9006
