= Nikolai Karetnikov =

Russian composer

Nikolai Nikolayevich Karetnikov (Russian: Никола́й Николáeвич Карéтников; 28 June 1930 in Moscow – 9 October 1994 in Moscow) was a Russian composer of the so-called Underground – alternative or nonconformist group in Soviet music.

== Biography ==
Karetnikov studied at the Central Musical School (1942–1948) and the Moscow Conservatory (1948–1953) where his teachers were Vissarion Shebalin (composition), Tatiana Nikolayeva (piano), Igor Sposobin and Viktor Tsukkerman (theory). He also studied privately with Philip Herschkowitz, a pupil of Berg and Webern. He was influenced by music of the New Viennese school and was a firm supporter of twelve-tone technique. His ballets Vanina Vannini and The Geologists were performed at the Bolshoi Theatre with choreography by Natalia Kasatkina and Vladimir Vasiliev. However, the authorities found the music unacceptable. It was criticized, and then banned from the performances in the Soviet Union for decades.

His Symphony No. 4 (1963) received its first performance in 1968 in Prague, just before the Soviet army invasion to suppress the Prague Spring. His third ballet Little Zaches Called Zinnober was performed at the Hanover Opera House (1971) in the composer's absence, because he was not given permission to travel abroad. His main activity at that time was writing incidental music for theatre, film and television.

He continued to compose and publish his serious works in secrecy. He wrote two large scale operas Till Eulenspiegel (1965–1985) and The Mystery of Apostle Paul, (1970–1987). Having no opportunity to perform these works in public, he persuaded the Moscow Cinema Orchestra to make the recording for him privately, section by section over the years. When the tape was ready, the vocal parts were added. This was, perhaps, the only examples of a samizdat (underground) opera. Finally, Till Eulenspiegel was premiered by the Bielefeld Opera in Germany conducted by Geoffrey Moull in 1993, and The Mystery of Apostle Paul was premiered in concert on August 4, 1995, Hanover after the composer's death.

Karetnikov was also the author of a collection of autobiographical stories called Темы с вариациями (Themes with Variations), published in Russia in 1990 (A French translation was published in the same year by Editions Horay).

== Works ==
Opera

- Till Eulenspiegel (Тиль Уленшпигель), opera in two acts (1965–1985) performed in 1993, Bielefeld, Germany
- The Mystery of The Apostle Paul, oratorio-opera in one act (1970–1987), premiered in concert August 4, 1995, Hanover, Germany

Ballet

- Vanina Vanini, ballet in one act after Stendhal (1960, performed 1962, Moscow)
- Little Zaches, Called Zinober, ballet in three acts after E.T.A. Hoffmann (1964–1967) performed 1971, Hanover, Germany

Choir

- Восемь духовных песнопений для мужского хора. Памяти Бориса Пастернака, 'Eight Sacred Chants for men’s choir. To the memory of Boris Pasternak.' Op. 24 (1969–1989).
  - Originally comprised five pieces composed between 1969 (1–4) and 1970 (5) and published by Universal Edition as Five Chorals in 1970 (plate number UE15115). Pieces six through eight were composed in 1989.
- Six Spiritual Songs for male chorus (1992)

Orchestral works

- Symphony No. 3 (1959)
- Symphony No. 4 (1963)
- Concerto for thirty-two wind instruments (1965)
- Chamber Symphony for 19 instruments (1968)
- Concerto for string orchestra (1992)
- Chamber symphony No. 2 (1994) posthumous

Chamber Music

- 10 Pieces for piano written in school years (1943–1946)
- Lento-Variations for piano (1960)
- Sonata for violin and piano (1961)
- String Quartet(1963)
- Little Night Music, quartet for flute, clarinet, violin and cello (1969)
- Concert Piece for piano (1970)
- Two Pieces for piano (1974)
- From Sholom Aleichem, concert suite for chamber orchestra (1985)
- Piano Quintet (1991)

Soundtracks

- Incidental music for theatre: about 40 including "King Lear", "A Man for All Seasons", "Macbeth", etc.
- Film scores: about 60 including "Run", "A Rotten Tale", "First Russians", etc.
- Radio & TV music

== Recordings ==
- Melodia C10 29949 000. (LP) Recorded: 1988. Nikolai Karetnikov: Тиль Уленшпигель [Til’ Eulenspiegel] (1985). Soviet State Cinema Orchestra; Conductors: Emin Khachaturian and Valery Poliansky.
- Le Chant du Monde LDC 288029/30. Nikolai Karetnikov: Till Eulenspiegel (Opera in 2 Acts) 2 CDs. Soviet State Cinema Orchestra; Conductors: Emin Khatchaturian/Valery Poliansky
- Le Chant du Monde, Russian Season LDC288070, Released: February 1994. Audio CD DDD. Karetnikov, Nikolai: Chamber Music. Performers: Oleg Kagan, Vladimir Skanavi, Vladimir Loukianov, Konstantin Komissarov, Alexander Petrov, Alexander Gothelf, and Yury Slessarev.

- 1. Sonata for Violin and Piano
- 2. Two Pieces for Piano
- 3. Concert Piece
- 4. String Quartet
- 5. Quintet for Piano and Strings.

== Bibliography ==
- Mikhail Tarakanov: A drama of non-recognition: a profile of Nikolai Karetnikov's life and work, List of Nikolai Karetnikov's principal works; in "Ex oriente...II", Nine Composers from the former USSR: Andrei Volkonsky, Sergei Slonimsky, Alemdar Karamanov, Valentin Silvestrov, Nikolai Karetnikov, Roman Ledenyov, Faraj Karaev, Victor Ekimovsky, Vladimir Tarnopolsky. Edited by Valeria Tsenova English Edition (studia slavica musicologica, Bd. 30), 245 pp. ISBN 3-928864-91-2
- Nikolai Karetnikov: Two Novellas, Translated by Rosamund Bartlett in Tempo. A Quarterly Review of Modern Music, Soviet issue, 173 (1990), pp. 44–47
- Karetnikov, Nikolay by David Fanning, in 'The New Grove Dictionary of Opera', ed. Stanley Sadie (London, 1992) ISBN 0-333-73432-7
