= Willy Vandersteen =

Flemish comics author (1913–1990)

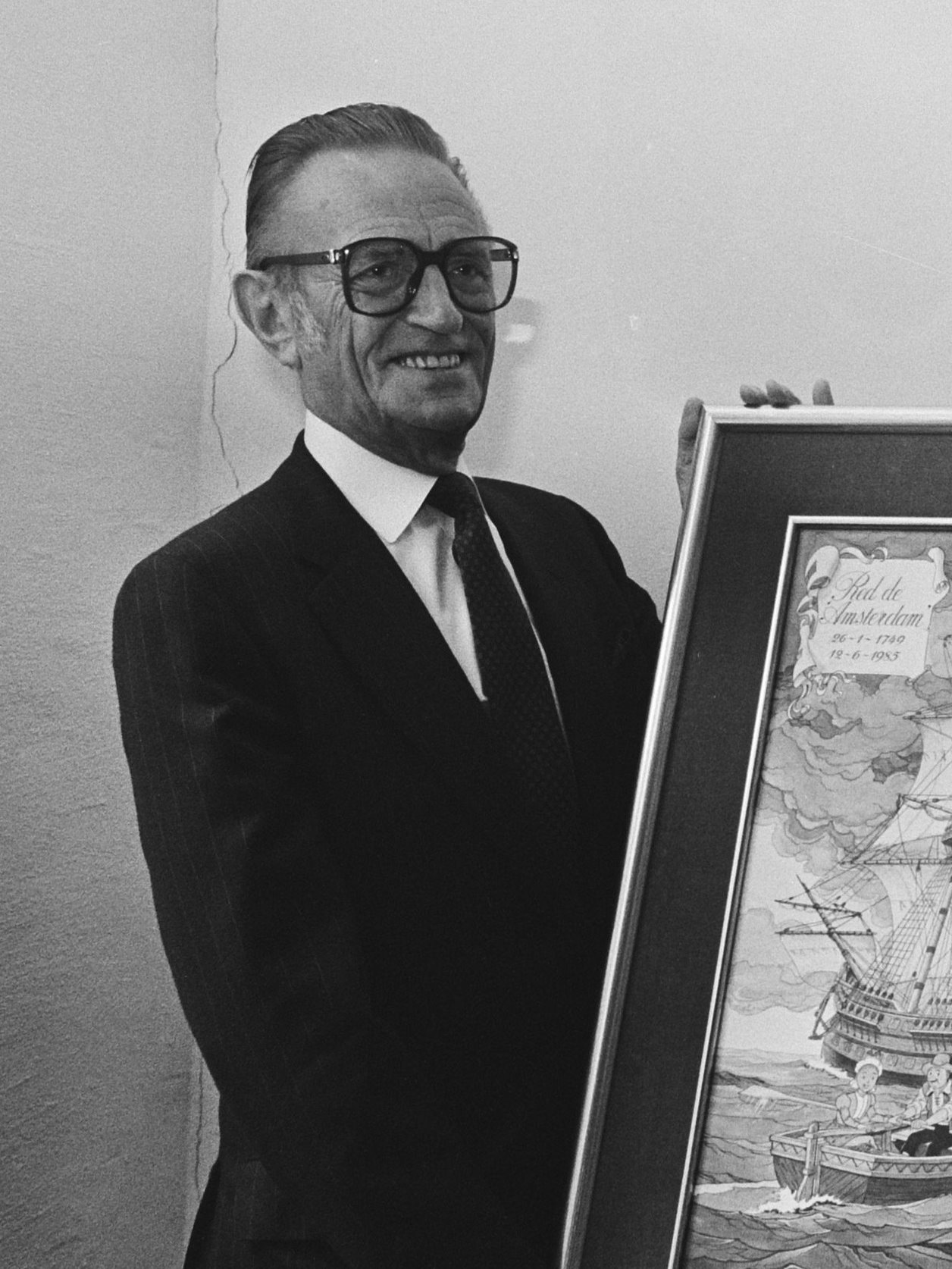
- Vandersteen in June 1985
- Born: Willebrord Jan Frans Maria Vandersteen; 15 February 1913 Antwerp, Belgium
- Died: 28 August 1990 (aged 77) Antwerp, Belgium
- Areas: Writer, Artist
- Pseudonyms: Kaproen, Wil, Wirel
- Notable works: Suske en Wiske; De Rode Ridder; Robert en Bertrand
- Awards: full list

Willebrord Jan Frans Maria "Willy" Vandersteen (15 February 1913 – 28 August 1990) was a Belgian creator of comic books. In a career spanning 50 years, he created a large studio and published more than 1,000 comic albums in over 25 series, selling more than 200 million copies worldwide.

Considered together with Marc Sleen the founding father of Flemish comics, he is mainly popular in Belgium, the Netherlands and Germany. Hergé called him "The Brueghel of the comic strip", while the creation of his own studio and the mass production and commercialization of his work turned him into "the Walt Disney of the Low Countries".

Vandersteen is best known for Suske en Wiske (published in English as Spike and Suzy, Luke and Lucy, Willy and Wanda or Bob and Bobette), which in 2008 sold 3.5 million books. His other major series are De Rode Ridder with over 200 albums and Bessy with almost 1,000 albums published in Germany.

== Biography ==
=== 1913–1939 ===
Willebrord Jan Frans Maria Vandersteen was born in Antwerp on 15 February 1913 to Franciscus 'Sus' Vandersteen and Anna Genard. His family lived in the Seefhoek, a poor quarter of the city, where his father worked as a decorator and wood sculptor. His studio was next to a printer that produced De Kindervriend, one of the first weekly youth magazines in Flanders. Willy Vandersteen, only four years old, read the new magazine there every week, including Blutske, an early comic strip. His mother was interested in ballet and singing. One of her favourites, Wieske Ghijs, may well have been the inspiration for the name "Wiske" he gave to one of the main characters in his main series "Suske & Wiske".

Vandersteen was creatively active from his youth. He drew pictures with chalk on sidewalks, and invented stories for his friends about knights and legends. He even convinced his young friends to buy him chalk so he could depict the local cycling championship. At school he was more interested in telling stories and learning about art than anything else. His best memory of these schooldays is of a teacher who introduced him to the works of Pieter Brueghel. Outside school, he spent most of his time with comic magazines and adventure books by Jules Verne or books about Nick Carter and Buffalo Bill. At 13, he enrolled at the Academie voor Schone Kunsten in Antwerp to study sculpture, and two years later he started working as sculptor and decorator, just like his father.

The same year, the family moved to Deurne, a suburb of Antwerp, where he came in contact with nature and with scouting, which both had a profound impact on his character and his later work. With the scouts, he became the troop reporter, writing down heavily illustrated reports on their outings and adventures, in a similar vein as what Hergé did in his scouting period. Through the scouts, he also came into contact with Le Boy-Scout Belge, the Walloon scouting magazine where Hergé made Totor, his first published comic. Vandersteen made a few sequels to these adventures for his friends as amusement, which are the earliest preserved comics he made. He continued to follow the work of Hergé later on. Meanwhile, Vandersteen combined his studies at the academy with his work in his father's workshop until 1935, when the market for stone decorations for houses collapsed.

In between some odd jobs, Vandersteen became an avid sportsman, from gymnastics to cycling to wrestling. His chances improved in 1936 when he was hired as a decorator for the shop and the display windows of L'Innovation, a Belgian chain of warehouses. In the same year, he met Paula Van Den Branden, whom he married on 9 October 1937. After living in Antwerp for two years and having a daughter, Helena, in 1938, the first of their four children, the couple moved to the more rural Schilde in 1939.

While doing research for his decorations, he read in an American magazine the article Comics in your Life. Fascinated, Vandersteen searched for more information on the subject. He rediscovered Hergé with The Adventures of Tintin in Le Petit Vingtième, and also the realistic work of Hal Foster in Prince Valiant. It would took a few more years before this fascination translated into steady publication of his own comics. Meanwhile, his first published drawings appeared in Entre Nous, the internal magazine of L'Innovation.

=== 1940–1944 ===
In March 1940, two months before the start of World War II in Belgium, Bob, his second child, was born. When the first tribulations of the war were over, Vandersteen could restart his work at L'Innovation. From November 1940 until August 1942, he created his first published comic, Kitty Inno, for the company, consisting of short, simple gags. When the German occupier forbade the publication of American and British comics in the Belgian newspapers and magazines, opportunities arose for local people. On 19 March 1941, the first comic strip of Tor de holbewoner (Tor the troglodyte) appeared in the newspaper De Dag. It continued until January 1942. Already on 26 March 1941 it was joined by De lollige avonturen van Pudifar (The funny adventures of Pudifar), a weekly comic strip about a cat. This was in May of the same year replaced by Barabitje, another comic about a cat, which ended in October 1941.

In 1942, Vandersteen quit his job at L'Innovation and started working at the Landbouw- en Voedingscorporatie (a government organisation for the agricultural sector), where he illustrated some magazines. In those years, the family Vandersteen moved, this time to Wilrijk, another suburb of Antwerp.

That same year, he illustrated the pro-occupation book Zóó zag Brussel de Dietsche Militanten under the pen name Kaproen. In the 1970s Willy denied rumors, based on drawing style, that he had been the real artist behind Kaproen. In 2010 these allegations were confirmed after an investigation demanded by his own family. Unlike his partners, Vandersteen was later not persecuted for his part in publishing the antisemitic drawings, which were considered collaboration with the Nazis.

At the Corporatie, Vandersteen met a colleague whose wife worked at Bravo, a weekly Flemish comics magazine that appeared since 1936 and had a French-language version since 1940. Due to the war conditions, they were desperately in need of local artists to replace the American comics they used to publish. Led by established Walloon illustrator Jean Dratz, a young team was gathered, with artists like Edgar P. Jacobs and Jacques Laudy. Vandersteen joined in 1943, and here his comics career really took off. First he created Tori, a reprise of the prehistoric Tor, and a few weeks later his new comic Simbat de Zeerover (Simbat the Sailor) was published on the cover and in colour, a first for Vandersteen.

For the Antwerp publisher Ons Volk, he created three comics, published as books without a prepublication in a newspaper or magazine. Piwo, about the adventures of a wooden horse, became his first comic album in 1943, and was followed by two sequels in 1944 and 1946. Those comics were also published in French. For the same editor, he illustrated 11 children books. In the same years, he also created the cover illustration for a number of novels from other publishers. In 1944, he also started working for two more magazines, De Rakker and De Illustratie, where he created some comics and made numerous illustrations. To help him with all this work, his wife Paula inked many of his pencil drawings in these years.

=== 1944–1949 ===
After the liberation of Belgium in September 1944, there was a boom of new magazines for the youth, both in French and Dutch. Many of those tried to mix American comics with local artists. Vandersteen worked in these early years for countless publications. He continued publishing in Bravo, with the medieval gags of Lancelot. Having moved to the suburbs of Brussels to avoid the bombardments of Antwerp, he came into contact with some French language editors. French language magazines he contributed to included Franc Jeu, Perce-Neige, and Le Petit Monde. Two of the comics he created for Franc Jeu were also published in albums. By 1947, all these magazines had disappeared.

Defining for his career was the invitation he got in 1944 from the people of Standaard Boekhandel, a chain of bookstores who were also active as publishers. They were interested in his work and wanted to publish some books. Vandersteen presented them with the first designs for a daily comic strip, but they put that on hold and first ordered four juvenile books from Vandersteen. These were published in 1945 and 1946 in Dutch and French (by Casterman).

On 30 March 1945, the daily comic strip Rikki en Wiske started to appear in the newspaper De Nieuwe Standaard, after a positive review by the young illustrator Marc Sleen. It was an immediate success, and the first story ran uninterrupted until 15 December 1945. Vandersteen though was disappointed to see the editor had renamed the strip Rikki en Wiske instead of his suggestion Suske en Wiske, and also felt that Rikki too closely resembled Tintin.

The next story, Rikki disappeared, and the long series of adventures of Suske en Wiske began with the story Op het eiland Amoras, achieving success beyond the author's expectations. The first album appeared in 1946. This story introduced most of the recurring figures and means of transport through space and time, and set the framework for the complete series. Already in 1946, it was also published in the Dutch newspaper De Stem.

On 22 December 1945, three days after the start of Suske en Wiske op het eiland Amoras, appeared the first page of De Familie Snoek (The Family Snoek), a weekly series of gags revolving around a contemporary Flemish family. It lasted for 11 albums.

Apart from these two long lasting newspaper comic strips, Vandersteen made a number of other comics in these years. Most important was his work for Ons Volkske, the youth supplement of the weekly magazine Ons Volk, which from the end of 1945 on became an independent comic magazine. Marc Sleen was editor-in-chief and filled most pages together with Vandersteen. Vandersteen created a number of realistic stories of about 20 pages each, where he developed his own style after starting very much as a follower of Harold Foster. In his usual more caricatural style, he created in August 1946 the recurring gagstrip De Vrolijke Bengels (The Happy Rascals). More adult comics appeared in the magazine Ons Volk.

In 1947, two publishers started a legal battle for the right to the names of the newspapers and magazines. Vandersteen, caught in the middle, worked a while for both, and eventually switched to the new owners of De Standaard. He continued to work for Ons Volkske, which was now renamed 't Kapoentje for a few more months. The publishers of De Standaard also continued the album series of Suske en Wiske, which started modestly with one album in 1946 and one in 1947. By 1947, seven albums were available, and the first ones were already reprinted. The first albums of De Familie Snoek had also appeared by then. Supported by large publicity campaigns, they sold very well: the first Snoek album was in its third impression by 1948. The popularity of Vandersteen, and the impact comics had in Flanders, is attested by the 25,000 readers who switched to the Standaard at the same time as Vandersteen did.

Vandersteen worked the rest of his life for De Standaard, and contributed also to the other publications of the publisher: Ons Volkske, a new newspaper supplement continuing the name of the older magazine, and Het Nieuwsblad, the more popular newspaper of the group. Vandersteen made illustrations and comics when needed. For Ons Volk, which also reappeared, he made realistic stories until 1951.

Vandersteen was now at the height of his productivity as a solo artist. Apart from his work for De Standaard and Het Nieuwsblad, he contributed to Ons Volk and Ons Volkske, he made a special Suske en Wiske story for het Parochieblad (a weekly Christian newspaper), and he started to contribute to Kuifje journal (Tintin magazine) that published Hergé. The magazine was very popular in Wallonia, and struggled in Flanders, where The Adventures of Tintin was not yet as well known. A popular Flemish author would give the sales a boost, while it could mean the breakthrough on the French language market for Vandersteen. However, Hergé, as editor-in-chief, set a very high quality standard for his magazine, and Vandersteen had to improve and stylize his drawings, and had to remove the more Flemish, popular aspects of his comics. Vandersteen obliged, and the stories of Suske en Wiske he created for Kuifje are now considered the best of his career, with the first one, Het Spaanse Spook (The Spanish Ghost), which started on 16 September 1948, as his masterpiece. It was because of his work for Kuifje that Hergé nicknamed Vandersteen "The Brueghel of the Comic Strip".

=== 1950s ===
Vandersteen could no longer handle the work load on his own. In 1949, he hired his first collaborator, François-Joseph Herman. Herman stayed with Vandersteen only three years. This short tenure was the start of the large Studio Vandersteen, which has continued the series. He was followed by Karel Boumans in 1952, who was an anonymous contributor until 1959. He worked mainly for De grappen van Lambik, a Suske en Wiske spin-off Vandersteen created for the weekly newspaper De Bond, which ran from 24 January 1954 on. He also inked many Suske en Wiske comics, including those in Tintin. Vandersteen devoted himself more and more towards the storytelling and the initial pencil drawing, which he considered the artistic process, while the inking was more of a craft.

The years from 1949 to 1953 are often considered the highlight of Vandersteen's career, when he combined large production with consistent high quality in his stories, the jokes, the many characters, and the graphical aspects, in which the charming quirkiness of the early years was balanced with the more rigorous ligne claire of Hergé. Many of these stories were loosely based on popular classics, ranging from Alexandre Dumas over Buffalo Bill to Richard Wagner's Der Ring des Nibelungen, with as culmination his comic in two parts of the legend of Till Eulenspiegel, made for Kuifje.

Vandersteen spent a lot more time at documentation from this point on. While the early comics were mostly filled by his imagination and visited imaginary countries or stayed close to home, he now started travelling to visit locations for new comics. Visits to Bruges, Monaco and Venice were the inspiration for three stories in Kuifje

In 1953, when Tijl Uilenspiegel was finished, Vandersteen created a new comical strip for Kuifje. 't Prinske told the humorous adventures of a young prince in a fictional country. It lasted until 1959 and ran for some 300 comics.

In 1951, Vandersteen encountered Karel Verschuere, a young unemployed artist. Vandersteen hired him, and Verschuere soon became his main artist for the realistic series. His first series was Judi, a retelling of the Old Testament in four albums, which first appeared in Ons Volkske. The series was not very successful, and Verschuere later finished a fifth part on his own. Verschuere also contributed to the second part of Tijl Uilenspiegel, just like Bob de Moor and Tibet did, but his main contribution to the output of Vandersteen was his work on Bessy, a Western series inspired by the success of Lassie, which started in 1952 in the Walloon newspaper La Libre Belgique. The series appeared under the pseudonym WiRel, a combination of Willy and Karel, indicating the importance of Verschueren's work. He continued working with Vandersteen until 1967, helping with many of the realistic series Vandersteen created in these years, including Karl May, Biggles and especially De Rode Ridder.

The success of Bessy, which from 1953 on also appeared in Dutch, led to the creation of the Studio Vandersteen, acknowledging, albeit mostly anonymously, that many of the comics were no longer made by Willy Vandersteen on his own. Together with the publications in Kuifje, it made Vandersteen a popular artist in Wallonia as well, and all Bessy and Suske en Wiske comics were published by Erasme in French.

=== 1960s ===
In 1966, Vandersteen finally moved back from Brussels, where he had lived at different locations since World War II, towards Antwerp, and more precisely Kalmthout, a rural village to the north of Antwerp. There, next to his villa, he created the location for his main Studio.

The Bessy comics were also published in Felix, a German comic magazine by Bastei Verlag. From 1965 on, they wanted to publish a complete new story every month, a rhythm they increased to twice a month in 1966. Unable to produce so fast, Vandersteen had to expand his Studio considerably. Led by Karel Verschuere, a team of some ten young artists mass-produced the comics, which were of considerable lower quality. The most important of these artists were Frank Sels and Edgar Gastmans, while many stories were produced by Daniël Janssens. When in late 1967 Verschuere quit, and at the same time Bastei increased the rhythm again, now to one complete comic a week, the Studio was disbanded and Sels and Gastmans started to work on a freelance basis. The next year, they decided to go behind Vandersteen's back and to sell directly to the Germans. Vandersteen then had to reorganize the Bessy Studio and hired Jeff Broeckx. The Studio continued until 1985, with artists like Patrick van Lierde, Ronald Van Riet, Eugeen Goossens, and Walter Laureyssens. It produced more than 900 Bessy-comics.

Bastei Verlag, enamoured by the success of Bessy, asked Vandersteen to provide a second weekly series. With the popularity of superheroes, especially Batman, in Belgium and Germpany in these years, Vandersteen proposed a spinoff series of Suske en Wiske, based on Jerom, the strongman of the series. Called Wastl in German, 173 stories were produced between 1968 and 1972, with a publication that reached 150,000 copies at its summit. The best of these stories were published in Dutch as well, just like it was done with the later Bessy's. The weakness of the stories ended the series after only four years.

The main artists in the Studio Vandersteen in the 1960s and later were Karel Verschuere, Frank Sels, Eduard De Rop, Eugeen Goossens, Karel Biddeloo and Paul Geerts. Eduard De Rop joined the Studio in 1959, after Karel Boumans departed, and stayed for over thirty years. He worked mostly on minor series like Jerom and Pats, and contributed to almost all series, including Suske en Wiske. One of his main contributions was the early adventures of De Rode Ridder. De Rode Ridder was in 1946 created by writer Leopold Vermeiren, and published in books since 1954, with illustrations by Karel Verschuere. The success led to the creation of a comics series as well, with as main contributors Verschuere, Eduard De Rop, and Vandersteen's son Bob. De Rode Ridder became the third main success story of Vandersteen, and is now the longest running series behind Suske en Wiske. Karel Verschuere was replaced by Frank Sels in 1963.

Karel Verschuere also started the series Karl May, based on the famous books, in 1962. The contributions of Vandersteen to this and similar series like Biggles was minimal and consisted mainly of supervision and some first sketches. Frank Sels continued the series between 1963 and 1966.

Vandersteen had to deliver a number of pages each week for the newspaper supplement Pats, increased to 16 pages in 1965. Eduard De Rop revived De Familie Snoek with a new series of gags for a few years, and other series like Karl May were published here as well. The place of Karl May in the main newspaper was taken by Biggles, yet another realistic series started by Verschuere in 1965.

When Frank Sels left the Studio in 1967, Karel Biddeloo took over most of the realistic series of Vandersteen. He made Karl May from 1967 until 1969, when the Bessy-studio took over the job. He also took over Biggles, which ended in 1969, when it was replaced by the jungle series Safari, inspired by Daktari. At the start of the series, Vandersteen did most of the creative work. After a few albums he left most of the work to Biddeloo. The series ended in 1974. Biddeloo then devoted most of his time to De Rode Ridder, where he started inking the stories by Vandersteen in 1967 and took completely over in 1969, when Vandersteen lost his interest. He continued working on it until his death in 2004.

=== 1970s ===
Paul Geerts joined the Studio in 1968, where he at first worked as an artist on the German Jerom comics. Already in 1969, he replaced De Rop as the main inker for Suske en Wiske. Geerts also drew Vandersteens attention when he proposed a few scenario's for Jerom, and in 1971 he made his first story for Suske en Wiske. From 1972 on, he became the main creator of the flagship series Suske en Wiske, which he continued until the late 1990s. De Rop and Goossens again became the main inkers, with Geerts responsible for the stories and the pencil art. In these years, Suske en Wiske reached its peak popularity, and the older stories now were republished in colours in the main series. In 1975 and 1976, the Dutch television broadcast six puppet movies with new Suske en Wiske stories. They were very successful and sales of new albums reached over 200,000 copies. The merchandising business boomed as well, and commercial comics were one of the main new jobs for the Studio.

The Studio was mainly established with the artists that joined in the 1960s. Two new artists were Erik De Rop and Robert Merhottein, who became the only artist to leave Studio Vandersteen and start his own successful series.

Vandersteen, liberated of the work on the daily comic, started on a comic series based on one of the novels he had read as a youth: Robert en Bertrand, the story of two Flemish tramps at the fin de siècle. The series debuted in De Standaard in 1972. The series was the first in a long time to renew the enthusiasm of Vandersteen, and the graphical quality and the stories were a lot better than most of the Studio production of the time.

For the newspaper supplement Pats, he also created the title series in 1974. He left most of the work to Merhottein. The series changed its name to Tits in 1977 after a lawsuit, and disappeared in 1986.

In 1976, Vandersteen's wife Paula died. He remarried on 25 June 1977 with Anne-Marie Vankerkhoven. Vandersteen, now a celebrated artist with complete TV shows made about him, both in the Netherlands and in Belgium, continued to work on his comics. The same year 1977 gave him a coveted Alfred award from the Angoulême International Comics Festival for the best scenario, for the Robert en Bertrand story De stakingbreker (The Strike Breaker), while in 1978 a Suske en Wiske statue was unveiled in the Antwerp Zoo.

=== 1980s ===
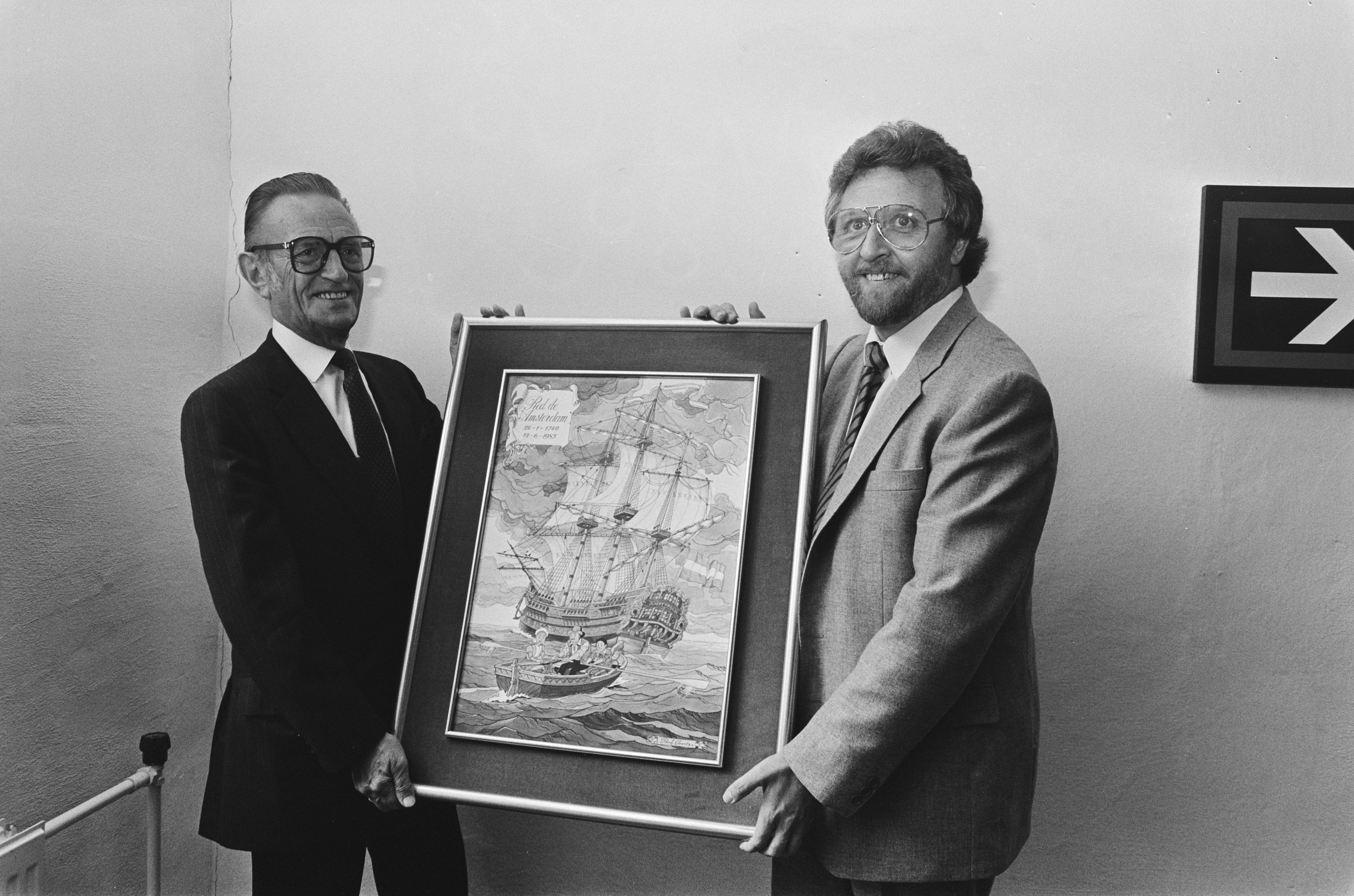
Vandersteen & Geerts (1985)

The next decade was one of mixed successes. Some of the minor or less successful series ended: Robert en Bertrand, a critical and never a commercial success, folded in 1993, 8 years after Vandersteen had stopped writing the stories. Jerom and Bessy both were restyled and disappeared a few years later in 1988 and 1993. Pats, later renamed Tits, already disappeared in 1986.

Suske en Wiske meanwhile was a steady success, and although the sales have dropped from the peaks of the 1970s continues to be one of the most popular Flemish comics.

Willy Vandersteen created one last new series in 1985: De Geuzen, a historical, humoristic comic set in Flanders in the sixteenth century. Similar in theme to the thirty years older Tijl Uilenspiegel, the comic combined many of Vandersteen's passions, including the art of Pieter Brueghel the Elder. It contained his most mature, developed characters, compared to the often one-dimensional characters of his earlier series, and reached a graphical level that approached his work for Kuifje. The comics were not prepublished and were mostly created by Vandersteen alone, which ensured the quality and also decreased the publication rhythm. Only ten albums appeared, and the series ended with the death of Vandersteen.

=== Death ===
Willy Vandersteen died on 28 August 1990, weakened by a lung disease. He continued working until shortly before his death, and his Studio still continues, with Suske en Wiske and De Rode Ridder as main series.

== Themes and influences in the work of Vandersteen ==
Willy Vandersteen used a wild variety of themes and influences in his work from early on. He made fairytales, historic series, westerns, but also science fiction and many contemporary comics. While some series like De Familie Snoek and Bessy stuck very close to their origin (an everyday Flemish contemporary family for the former, and a pioneer family in the American Old West in the latter), others were more loose. De Rode Ridder, the story of a medieval knight, wandered from Arthurian tales over the crusades until the explorations of the fifteenth and sixteenth century, thereby spanning some ten centuries, and later (when Vandersteen was less involved in the series) brought in many elements of sword and sorcery and fantasy.

Suske and Wiske is a contemporary series, but many stories used the plot device of time travelling, either by a machine or by some poetic device. This enabled stories to evolve in a myriad of periods, often again in the Middle Ages though. Furthermore, did Vandersteen use local legends of Antwerp and Limburg, parodies of American superhero series like Batman, science fiction, and popular TV series. Vandersteen also got inspiration from the different long journeys he made, like his long trip to the Far East in 1959. Some of the earliest realistic comics of Willy Vandersteen also clearly show the strong influence he has had from American comics like Prince Valiant and Tarzan, but he later developed his own distinctive style.

== International success ==
Vandersteen always strived to have success beyond Flanders, and reduced the typically Flemish character of his comics soon after his debut. He already worked and published in French during the War, and already in the 1940s he expanded the reach of Suske en Wiske to the Netherlands with some newspaper publications, and to Wallonia and France through the publication in Tintin magazine. All Suske en Wiske albums, and many albums of other series like De Familie Snoek, were also published in French by Erasme. Bessy was even first created for a Walloon newspaper, before being translated in Dutch. By 1978, an estimated 80 million Suske en Wiske albums had been sold in Dutch.

Other countries and languages followed soon. The first German translations appeared in 1954, and in the 1960s Bessy and to a lesser extent Jerom were an enormous success, with combined over 1000 weekly comics with a circulation of some 200,000 copies. Later in the 1950s followed publications in Chile and Portugal, and Spain followed in the 1960s. In the following years, Vandersteen's comics and especially Suske en Wiske were published in dozens of languages, but in most cases only one or a few albums are translated. More 9 albums were published in the United States, and in Sweden 69 albums were published, accompanied by merchandising. The Finnish series experienced success as well.

== Merchandising ==
In the 1950s started the merchandising around Suske en Wiske. Vandersteen, always a businessman as well as an artist, was enthusiastic when he got the proposal to make a puppet show of the series. Already in 1947, the first puppets were for sale. They were followed by a series of 5 hand puppets in 1957 and a Jerom-game in 1960. In 1955, two years after the start of television in Flanders, an animated adventure of Suske en Wiske was broadcast every Saturday afternoon. Other merchandising ranged from Suske en Wiske drinking glasses in 1954 to 5 large handpainted ceramic statues of the main heroes in 1952. Coloring books, calendars, puzzles, ... followed soon. Two records were released by Decca in 1956. Vandersteen also created a number of commercial comics with Suske en Wiske, starting with a touristic comic for the province of Antwerp in 1957.

== Awards and recognition ==
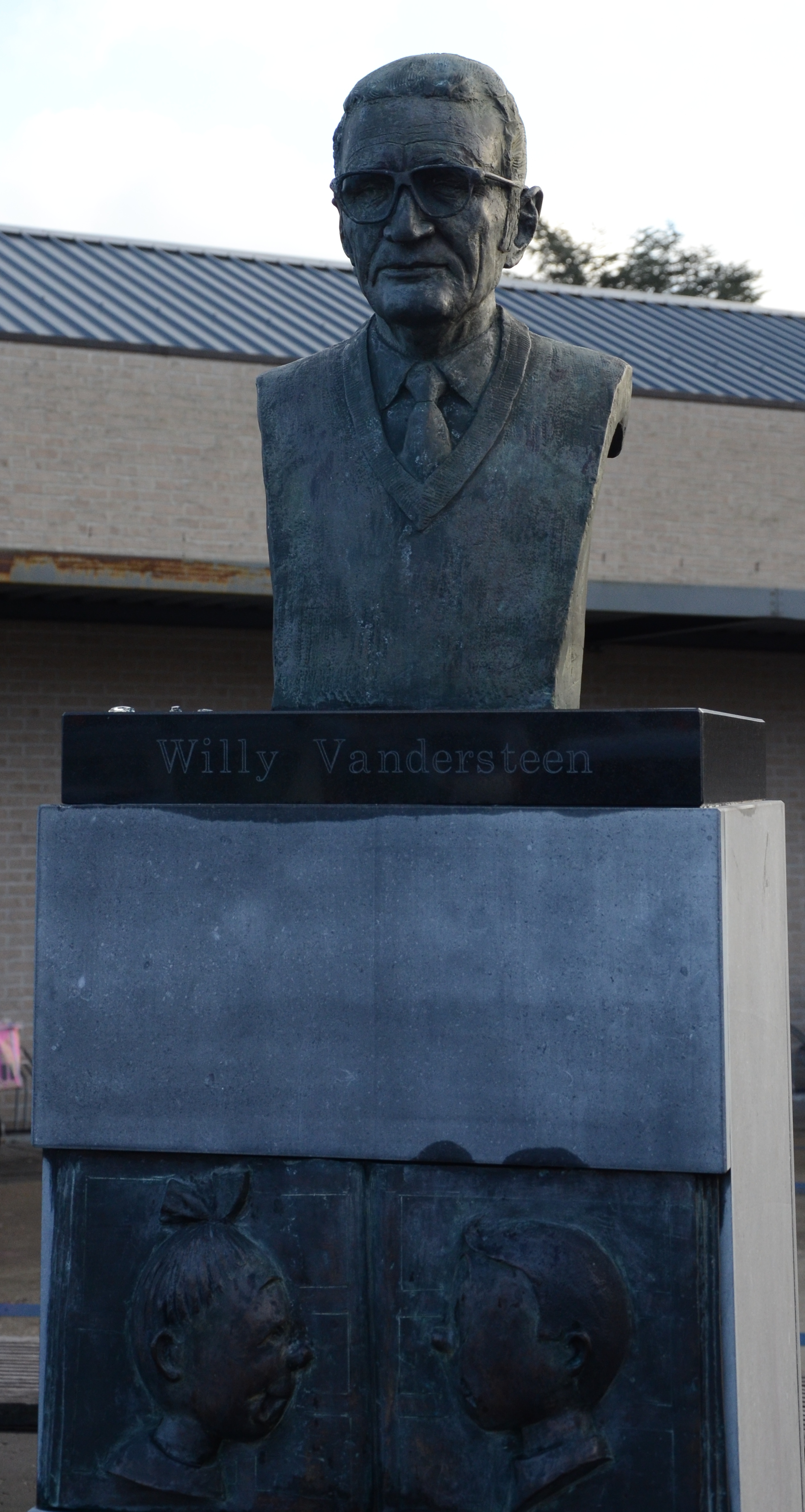
Bust of Vandersteen in Kalmthout

- 1959: Honorary citizen of the community Deurne near Antwerp
- 1974: Honorary citizen of Kalmthout.
- 1977: Angoulême International Comics Festival prize for Best Foreign Author, France
- 1988: A statue of Vandensteen, with Suske en Wiske was erected in Hasselt.
- 1997: The Suske en Wiske Museum was opened in Kalmthout.
- 2006: A bust of Vandersteen was erected on Willy Vandersteen Square, Kalmthout.
- 2007: Prestige award at the Prix Saint-Michel in Brussels
- From 2010, the Willy Vandersteenprijs is organized, a Flemish-Dutch comics album prize.
- 2013: A playground in Antwerp, Willy Vandersteenplein, was renovated.
- 2023: A Willy Vandersteen-day was organized in Kalmthout on 20 May.
- Books about Vandersteen, including De Bruegel van het Cartoon (1994), De interviews-De Foto's 1945-1990 (2005) and Willy Vandersteen: een leven in Kalmthout (2007).

According to UNESCO's Index Translationum, Vandersteen is the sixth most often translated Dutch language author, after Anne Frank, Dick Bruna, Cees Nooteboom, Guido van Genechten, and Phil Bosmans and before famous authors as Janwillem van de Wetering, Harry Mulisch, Hugo Claus, and Johan Huizinga.

== Bibliography ==
All series were originally published in Dutch and by the publisher Standaard Uitgeverij, unless noted otherwise. Commercial editions and other non-regular albums are not included.

Series	From	Until	Volumes	Volumes in French	Remarks
Piwo	1943	1946	3	3	First albums by Vandersteen, published by Ons Volk
Suske en Wiske	1946	Present	300+	300+	Numbering restarted at #67, and is as of December 2023 at #371: continued since 1972 by Paul Geerts and later by Marc Verhaegen, the series is now continued by Peter van Gucht and Luc Morjeau. Some albums are translated in dozens of other languages.
Snoek	1946	1969	18	5	No publications from 1955 to 1965
Judi / Rudi	1952	1955	4		Published by Sheed & Ward
Bessy	1954	1985	164	151	First 68 signed "Wirel", other Studio Vandersteen: more than 900 volumes appeared in German
Tijl Uilenspiegel	1954	1955	2	2	
De grappen van Lambik	1955	2006	7 and 4	3	Spin-off from Suske en Wiske: the second series contains reprints from the first, and new gags. No publications from 1963 to 2003.
De pantoscaaf	1956	1956	1		Published by the KSA, a Flemish Catholic youth organization
Het plezante cirkus	1958	1959	3	3	
De vrolijke bengels	1958	1959	2	2	
De Rode Ridder	1959	Present	280+	19	Continued by Karel Biddeloo and others: as of June 2023, 280 albums have been published.
Jerom	1962	1982	95	93	Spin-off from Suske en Wiske, more than 150 albums appeared in German
Karl May	1962	1985	87		Loosely based on the novels by Karl May
Biggles	1965	1969	20		Based on the figure created by W. E. Johns
Met Kil en Fil op het Kiliaanpad	1970	1970	1		Published by Louis Hellemans as promotion for the CVP party at the 1970 local elections
Safari	1970	1974	24	21	
Ciso editions	1972	1980	7		Ciso reprinted a number of classic Flemish magazine comics, including these realistic Vandersteen comics from the 1940s and 1950s
Robert en Bertrand	1973	1993	98	47	
Pats	1975	1977	7		Continued (and reprinted) as Tits
Tits	1979	1986	28		Sequel to Pats. The name Tits is the local Antwerp name for a boater straw hat fashionable in the old days.
De wonderbare reizen van Jerom	1982	1991	36	13	Continuation of Jerom.
Bessy natuurkommando	1985	1992	23		Sequel to Bessy, mainly by Jeff Broeckx
De Geuzen	1985	1990	10		Last series started by Vandersteen
Schanulleke	1986	1993	3		Spin-off from Suske en Wiske
't Prinske	1994	1997	4	4	Gags originally published in the 1950s but only edited as albums in the 1990s
Klein Suske en Wiske	2002	2010	16		Only created after the death of Vandersteen, but bears his name on the cover. Spin-off from Suske en Wiske, followed by Junior Suske en Wiske and Suske en Wiske Junior
Junior Suske en Wiske	2010	2015	11		
Suske en Wiske Junior	2020	Present	9		
