= Charles De Coster =

Belgian novelist

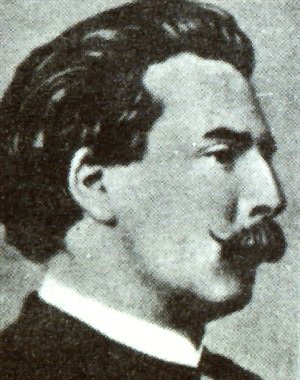
- Born: Charles-Theodore-Henri De Coster; 20 August 1827; Munich, Germany
- Died: 7 May 1879 (aged 51); Ixelles, Belgium
- Occupation: novelist

Charles-Theodore-Henri De Coster (20 August 1827 – 7 May 1879) was a Belgian novelist whose efforts laid the basis for a native Belgian literature.

== Early life and education ==
He was born in Munich; his father, Augustin De Coster, was a native of Liège, who was attached to the household of the Apostolic Nuncio to Bavaria in Munich, but soon returned to Belgium. Charles was placed in a Brussels bank, but in 1850 he entered the Free University of Brussels, where he completed his studies in 1855. He was one of the founders of the Société des Joyeux, a small literary club, more than one member of which was to achieve literary distinction.

De Coster made his debut as a poet in the Revue trimestrielle, founded in 1854, and his first efforts in prose were contributed to a periodical entitled Uylenspiegel (founded 1856). A correspondence covering the years 1850 to 1858, his Lettres à Elisa, were edited by Charles Potvin in 1894.

He was a keen student of François Rabelais and Michel de Montaigne, and familiarized himself with 16th-century French. He said that Flemish manners and speech could not be rendered faithfully in modern French, and accordingly wrote his best works in the old tongue. The success of his Légendes flamandes (1856) was increased by the illustrations of Félicien Rops and other friends. In 1861 he published his Contes brabançons, in modern French.

== Career ==
His masterpiece, The Legend of Thyl Ulenspiegel and Lamme Goedzak (1867), a romance set in the 16th century, was barely read in Belgium because it did not meet up to the conventional standard of Belgian nationalism, but became popular in the rest of the world. In preparation for this prose epic of the Gueux he spent some ten years. The character Uylenspiegel (Eulenspiegel) has been compared to Don Quixote, and even to Panurge. He is the type of the 16th-century Fleming, and the history of his resurrection from the grave itself was accepted as an allegory of the destiny of the race. His exploits and his friend's form the thread of a semihistorical narrative, full of racy humour, in spite of the barbarities that find a place in it. This book was illustrated by Félicien Rops and by others.

In 1876 De Coster introduced Xavier Mellery to the island of Marken, asking him to deliver drawings for the Tour du Monde magazine.

In 1870 De Coster became professor of general history and of French literature at the Belgian Royal Military Academy. His works however were not financially profitable; in spite of his government employment he was always in difficulties; and he died, much discouraged, in May 1878 at Ixelles, Brussels and was interred there in the Ixelles Cemetery.

The expensive form in which Uylenspiegel was produced made it open only to a limited class of readers, and when a new and cheap edition in modern French appeared in 1893 it was received practically as a new book in France and in Belgium.

De Coster was a freemason, and a member of the lodge Les Vrais Amis de l'Union et du Progrès Réunis of the Grand Orient of Belgium, where he was initiated on 7 January 1858.

Nicolas Eekman produced illustrations for The Legend of Thyl Ulenspiegel and Lamme Goedzak in 1946.

== Bibliography ==
- Style et archaïsme dans 'La Légende d'Ulenspiegel' de Charles De Coster, Jeeeen-Marie Klinkenberg, Bruxelles, Palais des Académies, 1973.
- Charles De Coster, Jean-Marie Klinkenberg, Bruxelles, Labor, 1985
