= Andreas K. W. Meyer =

German dramaturge (1958–2023)

- Born: 2 June 1958; Bielefeld, North Rhine-Westphalia, West Germany
- Died: 8 April 2023 (aged 64)
- Education: University of Münster
- Occupations: Dramaturge; journalist; opera manager
- Organizations: Opernhaus Kiel; Deutsche Oper Berlin; Oper Bonn

Andreas K. W. Meyer (2 June 1958 – 8 April 2023) was a German dramaturge, journalist, librettist and opera manager. He directed the Oper Bonn from the 2013–14 season. Meyer was focused on the revival of forgotten operas, especially from the early 20th century, such as Szenen aus dem Leben der Heiligen Johanna by Walter Braunfels.

== Life and career ==
Meyer was born in Bielefeld on 2 June 1958. After his Abitur passed at the Hans-Ehrenberg-Schule in his home town, and private composition studies with Rudolf Mors, he studied at the University of Münster from 1981, musicology with Klaus Hortschansky, among others, art history and German studies.

=== Journalist ===
In 1987, he began working as a freelance critic, among others for the Frankfurter Rundschau and various broadcasters including WDR and Bayerischer Rundfunk. He dealt in particular with the work of Carl Orff and Allan Pettersson.

=== Dramaturge ===
From 1993 to 2003, Meyer worked as music dramaturge at the Opernhaus Kiel, initially under the direction of general director Peter Dannenberg. He was promoted to chief music dramaturge in 1995, and additionally to deputy opera manager in 2002 when Kirsten Harms directed the opera. From 2004 to 2012, he was chief dramaturge at the Deutsche Oper Berlin, following Harms.

His particular focus as a dramaturge was the revival of unjustly forgotten operas, primarily from the early 20th century, which helped the Oper Kiel to considerable nationwide interest. He initiated an exemplary cycle of works by Franz Schreker, the reinterpretation of Gian Francesco Malipiero's I capricci di Callot, Franco Alfano's Cyrano de Bergerac and Die Liebe der Danae by Richard Strauss. His discoveries for the Deutsche Oper Berlin included Alberto Franchetti's Germania and Zemlinsky's Der Traumgörge, which met with less than unanimous approval. In the 2007/08 season, when he programmed Vittorio Gnecchi's Cassandra and the scenic premiere of Szenen aus dem Leben der Heiligen Johanna by Walter Braunfels, appreciation increased among audiences and press alike. The Braunfels opera was named Rediscovery of the Year in the critics' poll of Opernwelt magazine.

Meyer collaborated with stage directors including Katja Czellnik, Marco Arturo Marelli and Johannes Schaaf. In Kiel in 2000, he first directed operas, a double bill of Fennimore and Gerda by Delius and Bartók's Herzog Blaubarts Burg, stage design by Anna Kirschstein.

He wrote the libretto of Wilfried Hiller's 1998 opera Der Schimmelreiter after Storm's novella.

=== Opera manager ===
At the start of the 2013–14 season, he became manager of the Oper Bonn. He initiated revivals such as Der Traum ein Leben by Braunfels, Reznicek's Holofernes and Waltershausen's Oberst Chabert. In a series, FOKUS '33, he explored the reasons for the disappearance of operas from the repertoire under the Nazi regime. It presented revivals of Rolf Liebermann's Leonore 40/45, Meyerbeer's Ein Feldlager in Schlesien and Alberto Franchetti's Asrael. He programmed Clemens von Franckenstein's 1920 opera Li Tai Pe in 2022. At the time of his death, he prepared the first revival of Schreker's complete Der singende Teufel.

During his tenure, the Opera was awarded the distinction of opera house of the year in North Rhine-Westphalia by Die Welt, and his series FOKUS '33 was recognised as rediscovery of the year by the jury of the OPER! awards.

=== Death ===
Meyer died of heart failure on 8 April 2023, at age 64.

== Publications ==
- Meyer, Andreas K. W.; Munk, Christoph; Thode, Joachim (2001). Richard Wagner, Der Ring des Nibelungen : eine Dokumentation der Kieler Inszenierung 1997–2000 (in German). Kiel: Ludwig. ISBN 3-933598-46-X. OCLC 51574157.
- Meyer, Andreas K. W.; Thode, Joachim (2003). Wie man die Geschichte erzählt : die Oper Kiel von 1995 bis 2003 (in German). Kiel: Ludwig. ISBN 3-933598-80-X. OCLC 62749012.
- Deutsche Oper Berlin; Meyer, Andreas K. W. (2011). Deutsche Oper Berlin - Siebenjahrbuch 2004 - 2011; Chronik, Bilanz, Dokumentation (in German). Berlin: Nicolaische Verlagsbuchhandlung GmbH. ISBN 978-3-89479-669-3. OCLC 766107043.
- Hiller, Wilfried; Meyer, Andreas K. W. (1998). Der Schimmelreiter : zweiundzwanzig Szenen und ein Zwischengesang nach Theodor Storm : Textbuch (in German). Mainz: Schott. ISBN 3-7957-3384-7. OCLC 55000981.

Essays in various publications, including:

- Frederick Delius: Music, Art, and Literature. ed. Lionel Carley. Aldershot 1998, ISBN 1-85928-222-9.
- Franz Schreker, Grenzgänge – Grenzklänge [Medienkombination]. Zur Ausstellung "Franz Schreker: Grenzgänge – Grenzklänge" des Jüdischen Museums der Stadt Wien vom 15. Dezember – 24. April 2004. Inkl. 2 CDs. Editor Michael Haas and Christopher Hailey im Auftrag des Jüdischen Museums. Vienna 2004, ISBN 3-85476-133-3.

Meyer contributed to the Bayerische Staatsoper yearbook, the Allan Pettersson yearbook and the Bertelsmann Concert Guide.
