= Genoveva =

Opera by Robert Schumann

- Opera by Robert Schumann
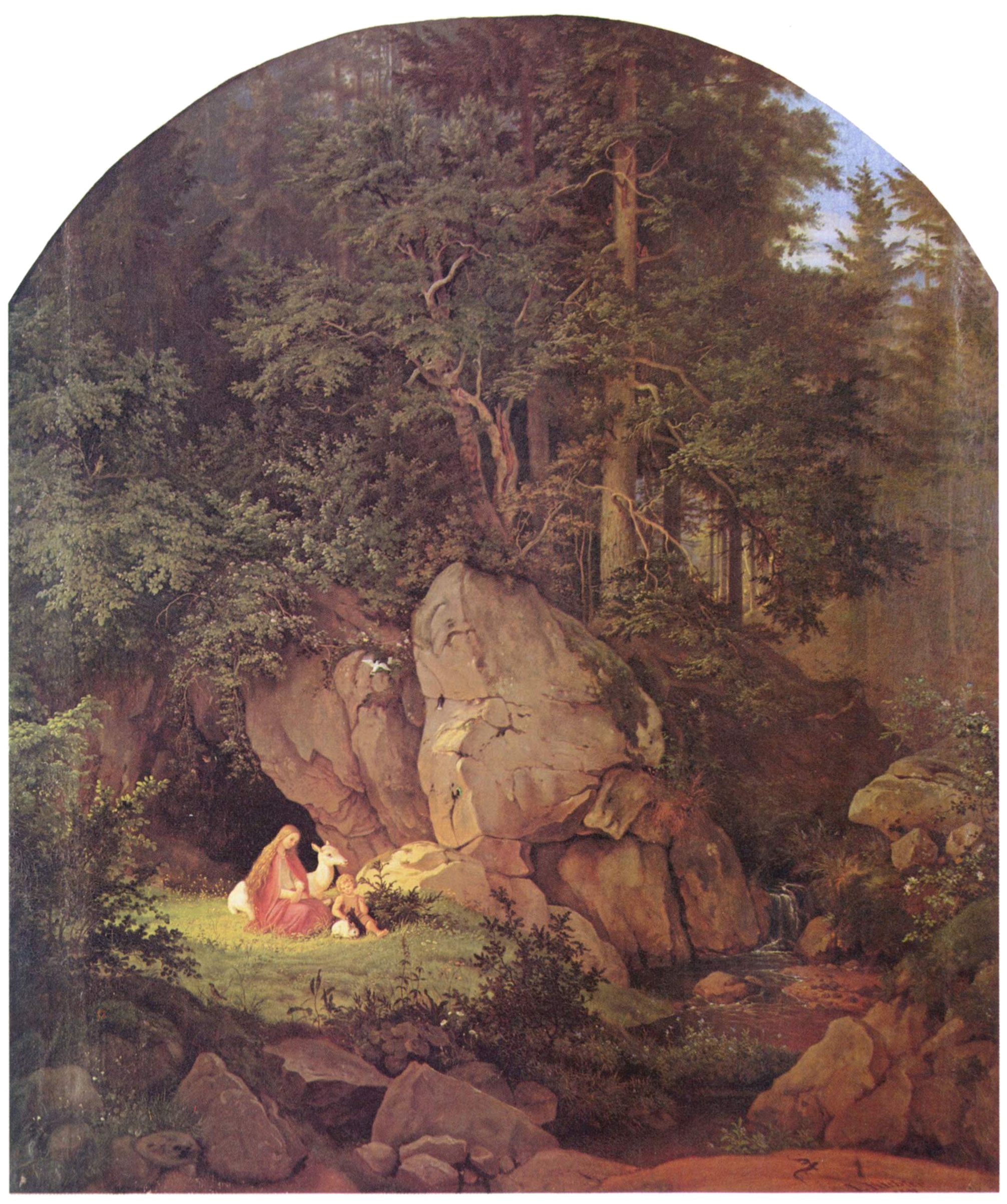
- Genoveva in the Forest Seclusion, by Ludwig Richter (1841)
- Librettist: Robert Reinick; Robert Schumann
- Language: German
- Based on: Genevieve of Brabant
- Premiere: 25 June 1850; Stadttheater, Leipzig

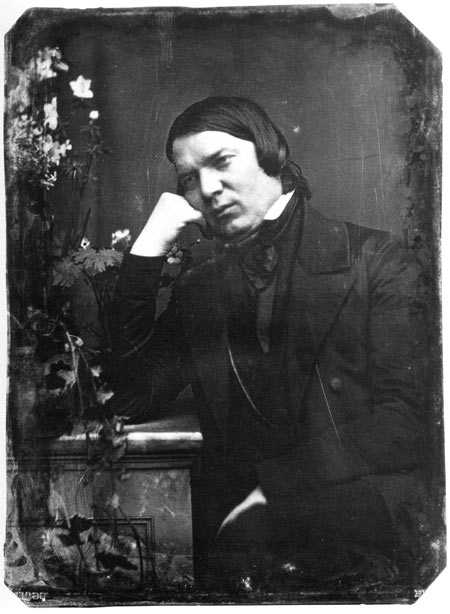
The composer in an 1850 daguerreotype

Genoveva, Op. 81, is an opera in four acts by Robert Schumann in the genre of German Romanticism with a libretto by Robert Reinick and the composer. The only opera Schumann ever wrote, it received its first performance on 25 June 1850 at the Stadttheater in Leipzig, with the composer conducting. It received only three performances during the premiere, and the negative criticism it received in the press played a decisive role in Schumann's decision to not write a second opera.

Genoveva is based on the story of Genevieve of Brabant, a medieval legend set in the 8th century that is reputedly based on the 13th century life of Marie of Brabant, wife of Louis II, Duke of Bavaria. The story gained in popularity during the first half of the 19th century, primarily in Germany through various theatrical settings. Two of the settings from this period, Ludwig Tieck's play Leben und Tod der heiligen Genoveva (Life and Death of Saint Genoveva) and Christian Friedrich Hebbel's play Genoveva, served as the basis for the opera's libretto.

The plot of the opera has several similarities with Wagner's Lohengrin, which was composed during the same period as Schumann was writing Genoveva.

Genoveva has never won a large popular audience, but it continues to be revived at regular intervals throughout the world and has been recorded several times.

== Composition history ==
Schumann expressed the desire to write an opera as early as 1842, and was fascinated by the possibilities of operas based on traditional German legends. His notebooks from this period show that, among others, Schumann considered the stories of the Nibelungen, Lohengrin and Till Eulenspiegel to be good candidates for settings in German opera.

Schumann began work on Genoveva toward the end of a period of intense depression. In the early 1840s, discouraged both by the greater public esteem enjoyed by his wife, Clara Schumann, a leading pianist as well as a composer with a high-profile career as a touring virtuoso, and by the fact that he was not offered the directorship of the Leipzig Gewandhaus, Schumann's depression intensified. In 1844, he and Clara moved to Dresden, where his depression eventually moderated and he began work on a number of compositions, including Genoveva.

While in Dresden, Schumann encountered Richard Wagner, whose discouraging comments on Schumann's libretto for Genoveva strained relations between the two composers. For his part, however, Schumann came to admire the dramatic impact of Wagner's operas, and the influence of Wagner's music worked its way into the score for Genoveva. Indeed, some of the musical techniques used in the opera, such as the fluid through-composed music (i.e. there are no recitatives) and lack of purely virtuosic vocal moments, are Schumann's personal interpretations and adaptations of Wagner's compositional methods.

Although the then recently constructed Dresden Semperoper house declined to stage Genoveva, much to Schumann's fury, he eventually secured a staging in Leipzig.

== Performance history ==
The Bielefeld Opera rediscovered Genoveva in 1995 in the first staged production worldwide in over 70 years. Conducted by Geoffrey Moull and directed by Katja Czellnik, the opera was given eight notable performances. Opera magazine of London wrote that

it is possible to say from the impression created by Geoffrey Moull's vigorous conducting that Schumann's theatre music is more plausible, more tense and more exciting than has so far been conceded.

The North American premiere was given in a concert performance at Emmanuel Church in Boston on 2 April 2005.

The opera was presented by the Zürich Opera in February 2008, and again by University College Opera, London, in March 2010.

== Roles ==
Roles, voice types, premiere cast
Role	Voice type	Premiere cast, 25 June 1850 Conductor: Robert Schumann
Genoveva, Siegfried's wife	soprano	Karoline Mayer
Golo, Siegfried's head servant	tenor	Theodor Wiedemann
Siegfried, Count of Brabante	baritone	Louis Brassin
Hidulfus, Bishop of Trier	baritone	Wilcke
Margaretha, Golo's nurse	soprano	Caroline Günther-Bachmann
Drago, an old steward	bass	Heinrich Salomon
Balthasar, Siegfried's servant	bass	Heinrich Stürmer
Caspar, a hunter	baritone	Meissner
Angelo	baritone	Zeimer
Conrad, Siegfried's farmhand	baritone	
Chorus: Ladies, knights, soldiers

== Synopsis ==
Act 1
The opera begins with Hidulfus, Bishop of Trier, summoning Brabant's Christian knights to join Charles Martel's crusade against a feared Saracen conquest of Europe. Siegfried, Count of Brabante, answers the call. In preparing to leave for war, he entrusts his wife, Genoveva, to his young servant, Golo. Margaretha, Golo's nurse, wants revenge for being banished by Siegfried for her involvement in black magic. She fuels Golo's desire and offers him her help.

Act 2
Despite Golo's overwhelming desire for her, Genoveva persistently rejects his advances. Infuriated by these rejections, Golo seeks revenge against Genoveva by staging a trap to discredit her. One night, Golo sneaks Drago, an old steward, into Genoveva's bedroom to fake an adulterous affair that is then witnessed by other servants, brought to the scene by Golo. In their rage, the servants kill Drago and Genoveva is imprisoned for adultery.

Act 3
Word of this alleged infidelity reaches Siegfried, who then commands Golo to put Genoveva to death. Drago's ghost appears in front of Margaretha and tells her that if she does not reveal the truth, she will die.

Act 4
As two armed men are dispatched to kill Genoveva, her life is saved through the intervention of a mute, deaf boy. Siegfried then discovers Golo's treachery and restores his wife's honour.

== Music ==
Genoveva is scored for 2 flutes, 2 oboes, 2 clarinets, 2 bassoons, 4 horns, 2 trumpets, 3 trombones, tuba, timpani and strings.

Schumann had an eager interest in the tradition of German-language opera, by his time having a well-established pedigree in the works of Mozart and Weber. He had an interest in the music of contemporary exponents of opera in Germany, such as Marschner and Wagner, and knew the music of Beethoven's Fidelio.

Schumann was eager to integrate into Genoveva the new approach to opera which Wagner's operas exhibited: he wrote for a brass-heavier orchestra than called for by classical models such as The Magic Flute or even Fidelio. He also omitted recitative, a recent innovation on Wagner's part which shared the burden of expounding an opera's plot more evenly between libretto and music. The Romantic themes of the opera are kin with not only Lohengrin, with which its plot has many similarities, but with much of Wagner's output. Wagner, like Schumann, had an eager interest in the art and culture of the middle ages which was due in part to Romantic revivalists like Schiller and Eichendorff.

After Wagner, but also in keeping with Schumann's own longstanding penchant for ciphers and coded messages in music, Genoveva makes use of leitmotifs; for instance, Golo is represented by a descending fifth then a dotted rhythm rising stepwise through a minor third. The whole of the opera sees the recurrence of this leitmotif, associated also with Genoveva's torment. The famous chorale theme which initiates the opera's action is built upon a related motif, which returns to characterise instances or mentions of religious piety and chivalry throughout the opera.

Linda Siegel writes of the opera that 'Schumann's preoccupation with the interplay between his characters, incidentally, led him to adopt a system of musical imagery amazingly advanced for the time: the highly complex web of musical symbols in Genoveva cannot be found in Wagner until Tristan'.

== Recordings ==
There have been three complete recordings made of the opera; one in the studio and three recorded live:

- 1977 – Siegfried Lorenz (Hidulfus), Dietrich Fischer-Dieskau (Siegfried), Edda Moser (Genoveva), Peter Schreier (Golo), Gisela Schröter (Margaretha), Siegfried Vogel (Drago), Karl-Heinz Stryczek (Balthasar), Wolfgang Hellmich (Caspar) – Rundfunkchor Berlin, Gewandhausorchester Leipzig, conducted by Kurt Masur (EMI 3 LPs, reissued 1992 on Berlin Classics 2 CDs).
- 1992 – Harald Stamm (Hidulfus), Alan Titus (Siegfried), Julia Faulkner (Genoveva), Keith Lewis (Golo), Renate Behle (Margaretha), Carl Schultz (Drago), Johann Tilli (Balthasar), Harald Stamm (Caspar) – Chor der Hamburgischen Staatsoper, Philharmonisches Staatsorchester Hamburg, conducted by Gerd Albrecht (Orfeo 2 CDs; live recording).
- 1997 – Rodney Gilfry (Hidulfus), Oliver Widmer (Siegfried), Ruth Ziesak (Genoveva), Deon van der Walt (Golo), Marjana Lipovšek (Margaretha), Thomas Quasthoff (Drago), Hiroyuki Ijichi (Balthasar), Josef Krenmair (Caspar) – Arnold Schoenberg Chor, Chamber Orchestra of Europe, conducted by Nikolaus Harnoncourt (Teldec 2 CDs; live recording from the Stefaniensaal, 27–30 June 1996).
- 2016 – Thomas de Vries (Hidulfus), Morten Frank Larsen (Siegfried), Annette Dasch (Genoveva), Michael König (Golo), Andrea Baker (Margaretha), Christoph Stephinger (Drago), Axel Wagner (Balthasar), Olaf Franz (Caspar) – Opernchor des Hessischen Staatstheaters Wiesbaden, Hessisches Staatsorchester Wiesbaden, conducted by Marc Piollet (Acousence Classics 2 CDs; live recording of a concert performance marking the 2006 Schumann Year).

Several notable conductors have made recordings of the opera's overture:

Year	Conductor	Orchestra	Label
1962	Franz Konwitschny	Gewandhausorchester Leipzig	Eterna
1964	Rafael Kubelík	Berliner Philharmoniker	Deutsche Grammophon
1964	Leonard Bernstein	New York Philharmonic	Columbia
1969	Otto Klemperer	New Philharmonia Orchestra	EMI
1972	David Josefowitz	Orchestre National de l'Opéra de Monte-Carlo	Concert Hall
1974	Tamas Breitner	Pécs Philharmonic Orchestra	Hungaroton
1981	Zubin Mehta	Wiener Philharmoniker	Decca
1985	Bernard Haitink	Royal Concertgebouw Orchestra	Philips Classics
1988	Neeme Järvi	London Symphony Orchestra	Chandos
1992	Raymond Leppard	Indianapolis Symphony Orchestra	Koss Classics
1993	Johannes Wildner	Polish National Radio Symphony Orchestra	Naxos
1999	Christian Thielemann	Philharmonia Orchestra	Deutsche Grammophon
2001	Lior Shambadal	Berliner Symphoniker	Arte Nova
2001	Walter Weller	BBC National Orchestra of Wales	BBC Music
2007	Thomas Dausgaard	Swedish Chamber Orchestra	BIS
2007	Riccardo Chailly	Gewandhausorchester Leipzig	Decca
2012	Paavo Järvi	Deutsche Kammerphilharmonie Bremen	RCA Red Seal
2013	Claudio Abbado	Orchestra Mozart	Deutsche Grammophon
2016	Heinz Holliger	WDR Sinfonieorchester Köln	Audite
2019	John Eliot Gardiner	London Symphony Orchestra	LSO Live
