= Kirsten Harms =

German theatre and opera manager (born 1956)

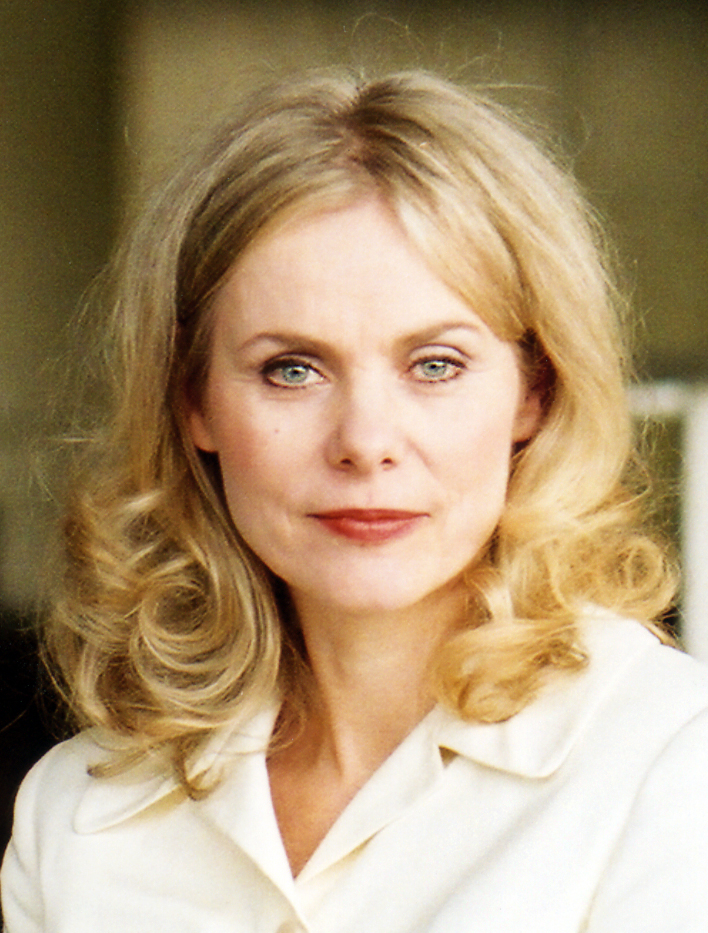
Harms in 2004

Kirsten Harms (born 25 June 1956) is a German theatre director and manager.

== Life ==
Harms was born in Hamburg. After she passed her Abitur in 1976, she studied flute and musicology at the University of Hamburg, then music theatre direction at the Hochschule für Musik und Theater Hamburg until 1982.

In 1983, she co-founded the independent theatre group "Mimesis". The group experimented with the genre "acting with music". At the Theater Dortmund, Harms was assistant director from 1985 to 1988. There she brought out her first own productions.

Afterwards, she worked as a freelance director, among others at the theatres in Bremen, Hanover, Kiel, Saarländisches Staatstheater, Darmstadt, Innsbruck and Mainz.

In 1992, she returned to the Hamburg University of Music and Performing Arts, now as a university lecturer with a teaching position in the musical theatre directing course.

In 1995, Harms became artistic director of the Opernhaus Kiel. Under her leadership, the Kiel house became one of the most successful medium-sized houses in the German-speaking world, resulting, for example, in over twenty mentions in a wide variety of areas in the nominations in the critics' polls of the magazine Opernwelt. With her Ring production, she also became nationally and internationally known. She also attracted attention with world premieres as well as productions of the excavations of rarely performed works initiated by her long-time chief dramaturge Andreas K. W. Meyer.

At the Deutsche Oper Berlin, Harms made her debut in 2003 as director of Gioacchino Rossini's Semiramide. From 2004 to 2011, she was artistic director of this largest opera house in the German capital.

At the end of September 2006, Harms came under public criticism for a unique act in the history of the opera world: due to a warning from the Berlin State Criminal Police Office as well as the Berlin Interior Ministry, Harms had two performances of Mozart's Idomeneo in the production by Hans Neuenfels temporarily removed from the programme. The reason was an epilogue that the director added to the opera: The final scene shows the severed heads of Poseidon, Buddha, Christ and Mohammed.

The Deutsche Oper, which she directs, was awarded the title of "Rediscovery of the Year" in the 2008 yearbook of Opernwelt for the scenic world premiere of Walter Braunfels' Szenen aus dem Leben der Heiligen Johanna (staging after Christoph Schlingensief), and in the same year the house's choir was awarded the title of "Choir of the Year".

In the 2004–2011 seasons, 38 productions of the Deutsche Oper Berlin were recorded for release on CD, DVD or broadcast on television and radio. These include the complete recordings of L'amico Fritz (Mascagni), Oberst Chabert (v. Waltershausen), Marie Victoire (Respighi), as well as DVDs of Germania (Franchetti), Rienzi (Wagner), The Cunning Little Vixen (Janáček), Szenen aus dem Leben der Heiligen Johanna (Braunfels) and Die Liebe der Danae (Strauss). This means that almost every fourth recording in the DOB's complete discography, which in 2011 consisted of around 130 CDs and DVDs of recordings from over 80 years, came from the last seven years of Harms' directorship.

The following directorial works by Harms have also been produced as CDs or DVDs: Das Spielwerk und die Prinzessin DE (Schreker) CD 1999, Christophorus premiere (Schreker) CD 2001, Die Liebe der Danae (Strauss) CD, NDR 2003 (from Kiel), Germania (Franchetti) DVD 2006, Semiramide (Rossini) CD, Radio France 2007 (from Montpellier), Die Liebe der Danae (Strauss) DVD, Hörfunk- u. Fernsehübertragung 2011 (from Berlin), Vom Ende der Unschuld (Pfeiffer) NDR 2013 (from Hamburg), Die Königin von Saba (Goldmark) CD, SWR 2015 (from Freiburg), I gioielli della Madonna (Wolf-Ferrari) CD, SWR 2016 (from Freiburg).

Under Harms, the Big Band of the Deutsche Oper Berlin (2006), the Children's Choir of the Deutsche Oper Berlin with 200 children (2008), the Youth Club of the Deutsche Oper Berlin e.V. and the Young Patrons in the Friends of the Deutsche Oper Berlin e.V. were founded. (both 2009). International guest performances took the Deutsche Oper to Turkey (Aspendos) in 2006, to France (Montpellier) in 2007, to China (Beijing) in 2008 and again to Turkey (Istanbul) in 2010. In 2006–2008, the Deutsche Oper restaurant and the Götz-Friedrich-Platz with its open staircase, fountain and outdoor catering facilities were built. In 2009–2010, it commissioned a new lighting concept to illuminate the foyers and the outer opera building. The entire stage technology with upper and lower machinery as well as the stage lighting system was renovated from the ground up.

In 2011, Harms' seven-year directorship came to an end. She was judged by the trade press to have been extraordinarily efficient artistically, financially and organisationally. In particular, a refined dramaturgy of the programme and the rediscovery of unknown great operas, mainly by ostracised or persecuted composers, became her trademark. Audiences responded with a 21.6% increase in occupancy, and Deutsche Oper managed to double its income.

Since 2016, Harms has been vice-president of the International Women's Forum Germany.

Harms is married to the set designer Bernd Damovsky and has a son, Julian Gregor Damovsky.

== Important productions ==
- Giacomo Puccini: Madama Butterfly; 1990; Darmstadt
- Richard Wagner: Lohengrin; 1992; Kiel
- Gaetano Donizetti: L'elisir d'amore; 1993; Bremen
- Ambroise Thomas: Mignon; 1993; Saarbrücken
- Vincenzo Bellini: La sonnambula; 1994; Innsbruck
- Giacomo Puccini: Turandot; 1995; Kiel
- Richard Strauss: Die Frau ohne Schatten; 1996; Kiel
- Richard Wagner: Das Rheingold; 1997; Kiel
- Frederick Delius: The Magic Fountain [premiere]; 1997; Kiel
- Richard Wagner: Die Walküre; 1998; Kiel
- Wilfried Hiller: Der Schimmelreiter [premiere]; 1998; Kiel
- Richard Wagner: Siegfried; 1999; Kiel
- Richard Wagner: Götterdämmerung; 2000; Kiel
- Richard Strauss: Die Liebe der Danae; 2001; Kiel
- Richard Strauss: Die schweigsame Frau; 2001; Kiel
- Franz Schreker: Christophorus oder „Die Vision einer Oper“; 2002; Kiel
- Franz Schreker: Das Spielwerk und die Prinzessin; 2003; Kiel
- Gioachino Rossini: Semiramide; 2003; Berlin
- Jerry Bock: Fiddler on the Roof; 2003; Bonn
- William Shakespeare: Romeo und Julia; 2004; Dresden
- Alberto Franchetti: Germania; 2006; Berlin
- Vittorio Gnecchi: Cassandra / Richard Strauss: Elektra; 2007; Berlin
- Richard Wagner: Tannhäuser; 2008; Berlin
- Richard Strauss: Die Frau ohne Schatten; 2009; Berlin
- Giacomo Puccini: La fanciulla del West; 2010; Puccini Festival Torre del Lago
- Richard Strauss: Die Liebe der Danae; 2011; Berlin
- Stephan Pfeiffer: Vom Ende der Unschuld; 2013; Hamburg; ev. Kirchentag
- Giacomo Puccini: Madama Butterfly; 2014; Stockholm
- Karl Goldmark: Die Königin von Saba; 2015; Freiburg
- Ermanno Wolf-Ferrari: I gioielli della Madonna; 2016; Freiburg

== Dismissal of Idomeneo 2006 ==
See 2006 Idomeneo controversy by Deutsche Oper Berlin.
