= Denise Djokic =

Canadian cellist (born 1980)

Denise Djokic (born 13 November 1980) is a Canadian cellist from Halifax, Nova Scotia. The Strad magazine has called her instantly recognizable for her "arrestingly beautiful tone colour".

== Career ==
Djokic is a native of Halifax. She grew up in a large musical family and first began to learn the cello with her uncle, Pierre Djokic. Her parents, Lynn and Philippe, are both musicians, as is her brother, Marc.

A soloist with many orchestras, she has appeared with the Toronto Symphony, North Carolina Symphony, National Arts Centre Orchestra, Portland Symphony, Buffalo Philharmonic, Thunder Bay Symphony Orchestra, Windsor Symphony Orchestra and Mexico City's Orquesta Filharmonica UNAM, as well as the symphony orchestras of Vancouver, Omaha, Montreal, Winnipeg, Syracuse, Santa Cruz, Brazil's Amazonas Philharmonic, and many others across the continent. She has collaborated with conductors Andrew Litton, Geoffrey Moull, Grant Llewellyn, Yannick Nezet-Seguin, Bernhard Gueller, Kazuyoshi Akiyama, Avi Ostrovsky, and Kenneth Schermerhorn.

As a recitalist, Djokic performs with her long-time musical partner, pianist David Jalbert. They have performed together in Washington, D.C. at the Phillips Collection and Museum of Women in the Arts, in San Francisco, Cologne, Mexico City, Vancouver, at Chicago's Dame Myra Hess series and New York's Bargemusic, as well as many other cities throughout North America. Djokic and Jalbert also tour with Piano Plus, an organization which brings performances to rural communities in Canada. Djokic's love of chamber music brings her to many festivals each year, including the Ottawa Chamber Music Festival, Caramoor, Park City, Ravinia, San Miguel de Allende, and the Vancouver Chamber Music Festival. She performs with New York's Omega Ensemble and the Jupiter Chamber Players.

Immediately following the release of her debut recording on the Sony Classical label, Djokic was a featured performer at the 2002 Grammy Awards. The self-titled CD won great critical acclaim and received a 2002 East Coast Music Award. Her following recording, Folklore (Allegro/Endeavor), received a JUNO nomination as well as an ECMA, and hit the Billboard chart's top 15 classical CDs. Folklore was also featured on NPR's All Things Considered. Djokic has recently recorded the complete Britten Solo Suites for the ATMA label.

Djokic was the subject of a BRAVO! TV documentary entitled Seven Days, Seven Nights, which followed her through a week-long recital tour. She has been a speaker at IdeaCity in Toronto, and was a keynote speaker at the Queen's Women In Leadership Conference. She was named by Maclean's magazine as one of the top "25 Canadians who are Changing our World", and by ELLE magazine as one of "Canada's Most Powerful Women".
