= Arthur Post =

American conductor (born 1959)

Arthur Post (born September 13, 1959) is an American conductor. He was music director of the Thunder Bay Symphony Orchestra (from 2010 to 2017) and the San Juan Symphony (from 2002 to 2015).

== Biography ==
Arthur Post was raised in Norwalk, Connecticut. He attended public schools, began studying the double bass at the age of nine, and graduated as valedictorian of his high school class. During high school Post performed in both symphony orchestras and jazz ensembles, and was awarded prizes for his performances at Boston University, Tanglewood Institute and the Berklee Jazz Festival.

Post attended Yale College and graduated with a BA, summa cum laude, with distinction in Music. While at Yale, he began studying conducting with Robert Kapilow, and was appointed conductor of the Yale Bach Society. He earned a master's degree in conducting from The Juilliard School, studying with Jorge Mester, then studied opera conducting with Klauspeter Seibel at the Hamburg Hochschule für Musik. He attended summer conducting programs at the Tanglewood Music Center, Salzburg Mozarteum, Schleswig-Holstein Musik Festival and Los Angeles Philharmonic Institute, and conducted in masterclasses with Leonard Bernstein, Erich Leinsdorf, and Simon Rattle.

In 1994 Arthur was hired as assistant conductor of the Pittsburgh Symphony Orchestra under Lorin Maazel, Associate Conductor of the Israel Philharmonic under Zubin Mehta, and Resident Conductor of the New World Symphony under Michael Tilson Thomas. In 1999 Post conducted members of the Chicago Symphony Orchestra in two concerts with singer James Taylor.

In 2002 he was appointed music director of the San Juan Symphony, a regional orchestra serving the Four Corners area of Colorado and New Mexico. He led the orchestra for twelve years, leaving in 2015.

In 2010 he was appointed music director of the Thunder Bay Symphony Orchestra in Ontario, Canada.

As a guest conductor Post has led the symphonies of Monterey County, Columbus, Detroit, Grand Rapids, Houston, New Jersey, North Carolina, and Virginia in the United States, and the Barcelona Symphony and Catalonia National Orchestra (OBC), Helsinki Philharmonic, Jerusalem Symphony, London Mozart Players, Orchestre National de Lille, Orchestre National de Toulouse, Rundfunk-Sinfonieorchester Berlin, Rundfunk-Sinfonieorchester Saarbrücken, and Symphonieorchester des Bayerischen Rundfunks in Europe.

== Personal ==
Arthur Post is married to the Catalan mezzo-soprano, Gemma Coma-Alabert, with whom he has two children. He is an avid outdoorsman.

== Positions held ==
Preceded by	Office	Succeeded by
Bernard Rubenstein	Music Director, San Juan Symphony, 2002–15	Thomas Heuser
Geoffrey Moull	Music Director, Thunder Bay Symphony Orchestra, 2010–17	Paul Haas
