= Luc Versteylen =

Belgian priest and politician (1927–2021)

Luc Benoît Valérie Jean Laurent Marie Versteylen (Borgerhout, Antwerp, 11 September 1927 – 10 February 2021) was a Flemish Jesuit priest and founder of the environmental movement Agalev.

In his youth, Luc Versteylen was a member of Verdinaso. In his own words, as a 15-year-old volunteer aid worker, he received his priestly calling when he witnessed the havoc and human tragedy caused by the American air raid on Mortsel in April 1943. Versteylen was ordained a priest in 1959 and in 1960 became a teacher at Xaverius College in Borgerhout, where he had himself studied during the Second World War.

Luc Versteylen spent the last years of his life in the WZC Wommelgheem care home near Selsaete castle in Wommelgem, where he died as a result of COVID-19 on 10 February 2021, at age 93, during the COVID-19 pandemic in Belgium.
