= Alphonse De Cuyper =

Belgian sculptor and painter

Olympic medal record

Art competitions
Bronze medal – third place	1920 Antwerp	Sculpture

Alphonse Josef De Cuyper (1887–1950) was a Belgian sculptor and painter from Heverlee, Leuven.

In 1920, De Cuyper won a bronze medal in the art competitions of the Olympic Games for his Lanceur de Poids and for Coureur ("Shot Putter" and "Runner"). He also participated at the art competitions at the Games of 1928 and 1936.
