= Xaverius College =

Location
- collegelaan Borgerhout, Belgium

Information
- Type: Coeducational
- Established: 1935; 91 years ago
- Principal: Alex Peeters
- Grades: 1-12
- Enrollment: 800
- Affiliation: Jesuit (Roman Catholic)
- Website: Xaverius

Xaverius College, in Borgerhout, near Antwerp, Belgium, is affiliated with the Jesuits in Flanders, the northern and western part of Belgium where Dutch is spoken.

== History ==
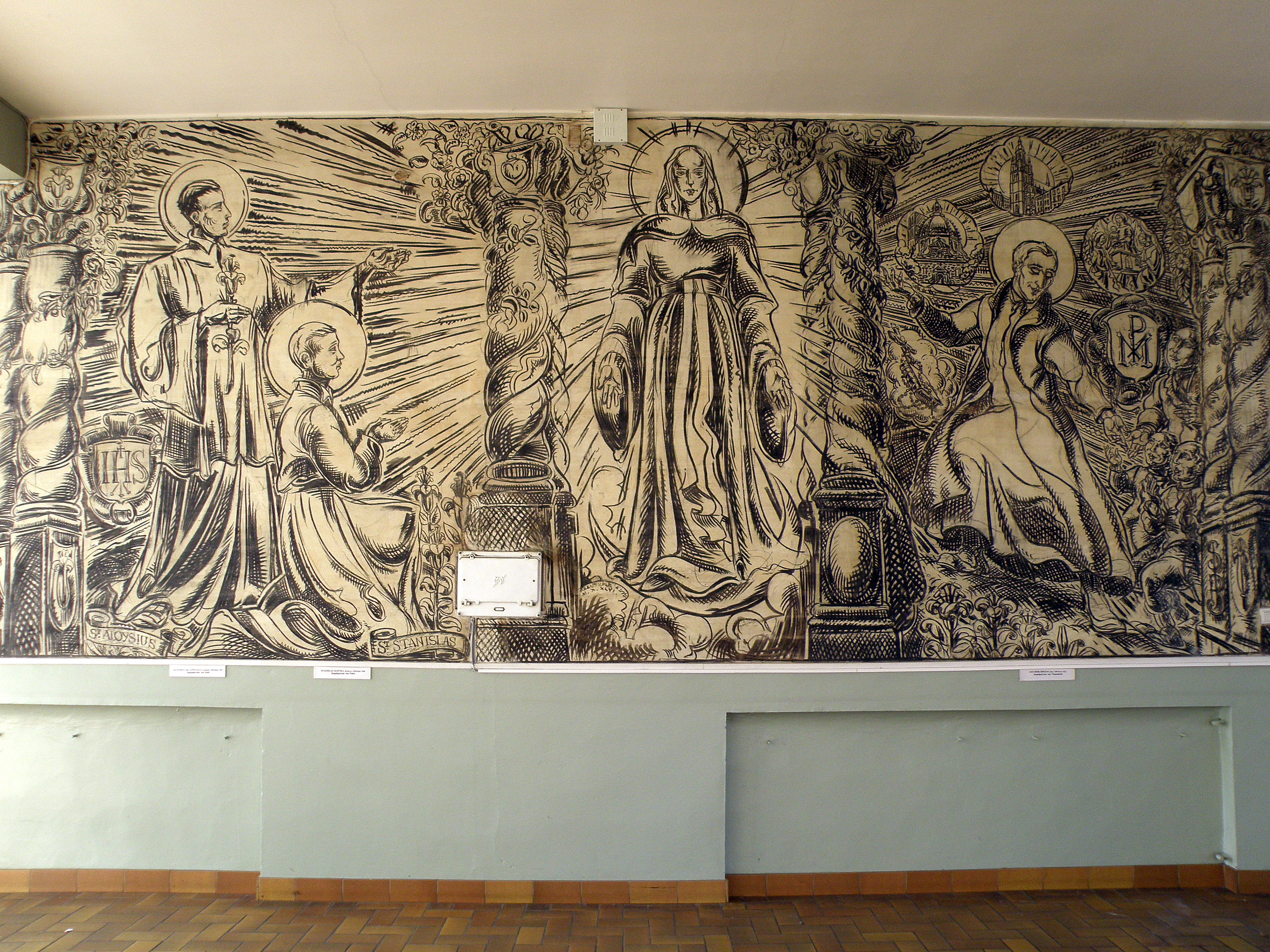

Xaverius College enrolls about 900 students, girls and boys, between 6 and 18 years old. It is a mix of old and new buildings around the recreation areas and the monastery garden. A group of Jesuits live nearby but they no longer teach as they used to. The long corridors on the monastery's ground floor are lined with the masterpieces of Alfred Ost, a well known Flemish artist. During his lifetime he was a poor man. He would visit and eat with the Jesuits in the community. Instead of paying them with money, he drew big scenes on the white walls.

In 2014 the school installed an up-to-date, integrated internet system.

In 2016 Xaverius responded to the need for a head start before first grade, and bought several buildings in the area along with an interior space for a playground, to accommodate 220 kindergarten students and free up space for some of the primary classrooms.

== Programs ==
Classes are small and include English, French, German, Latin, Dutch, Mathematics, Physics, Chemistry, Biology, Religion, History, Geology, plastic arts, and sports. The school day begins at 8:20 and ends at 4:10. Wednesday is half day – 4 hours.

Xaverius College has also been attended by some Americans under the auspices of The American Field Service.

Every year each class makes a trip during the Easter vacation. Eleventh year students visit Paris, and 12th year students visit Italy. To sensitize students to global citizenship, Xaverius has a partner school and immersion program with Ntemo College, Kasongo Lunda, DRC Congo. The school has lent its support to the Antwerp fair trade agreement.

== Notable alumni ==
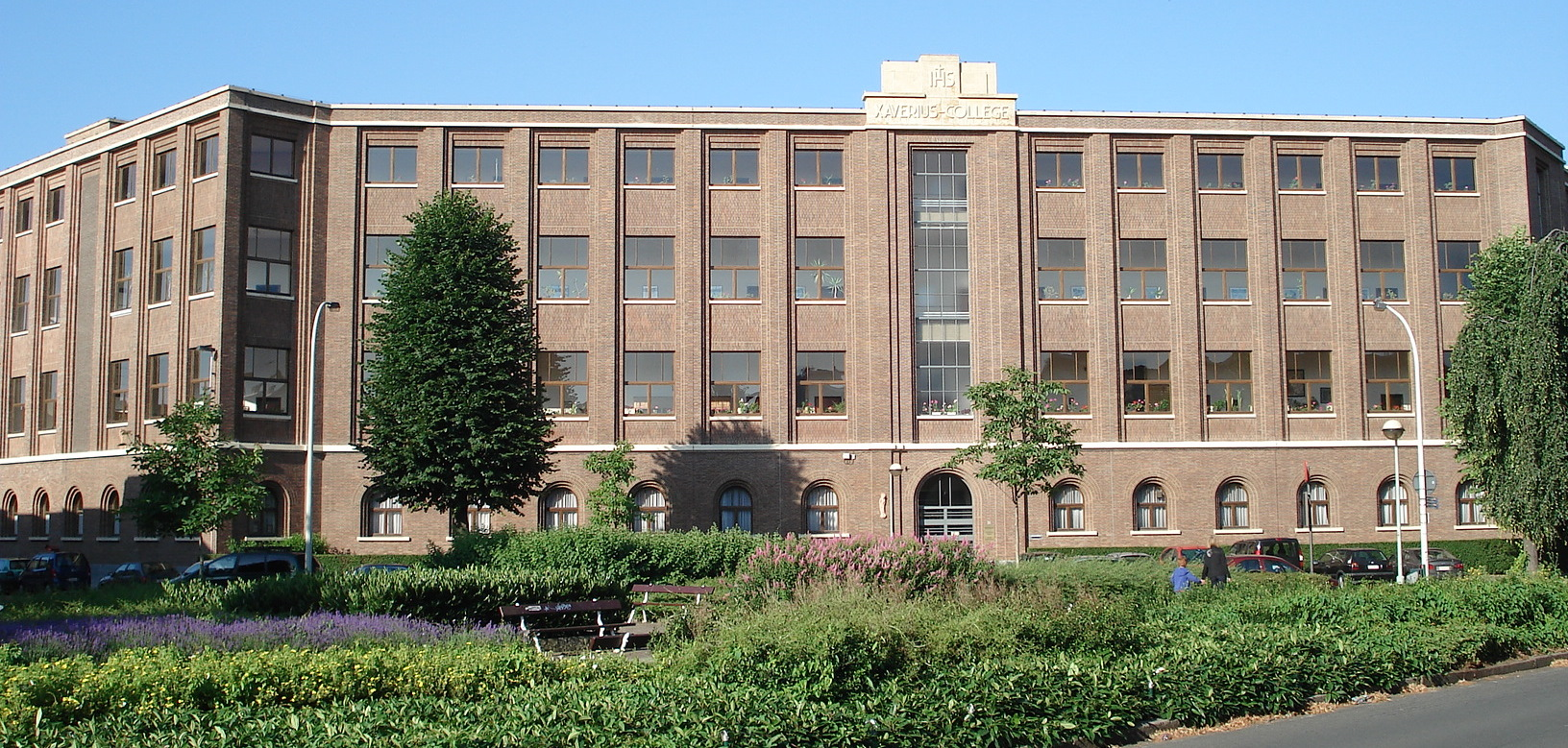
1940 building, a national monument

- Ludo Abicht, philosopher, publicist, poet
- Bart Brinckman, journalist
- Ludo Dierickx, politician
- Marieke Dilles, theater and film actress
- Tom Lenaerts, television producer
- Johan Petit, actor and cabaret performer
- Herman Portocarero, diplomat and author
- Hugo de Ridder, journalist, essayist, publicist
- Hugo Schiltz, lawyer and politician
- Siska Schoeters, television host
- Johan Terryn, actor and scenario writer
- Luc Versteylen, Jesuit priest, founder of Agalev Green Party

== See also ==
- List of Jesuit sites in Belgium
- Diocese of Antwerp
