= Theodore Andrea Cook =

British writer and critic

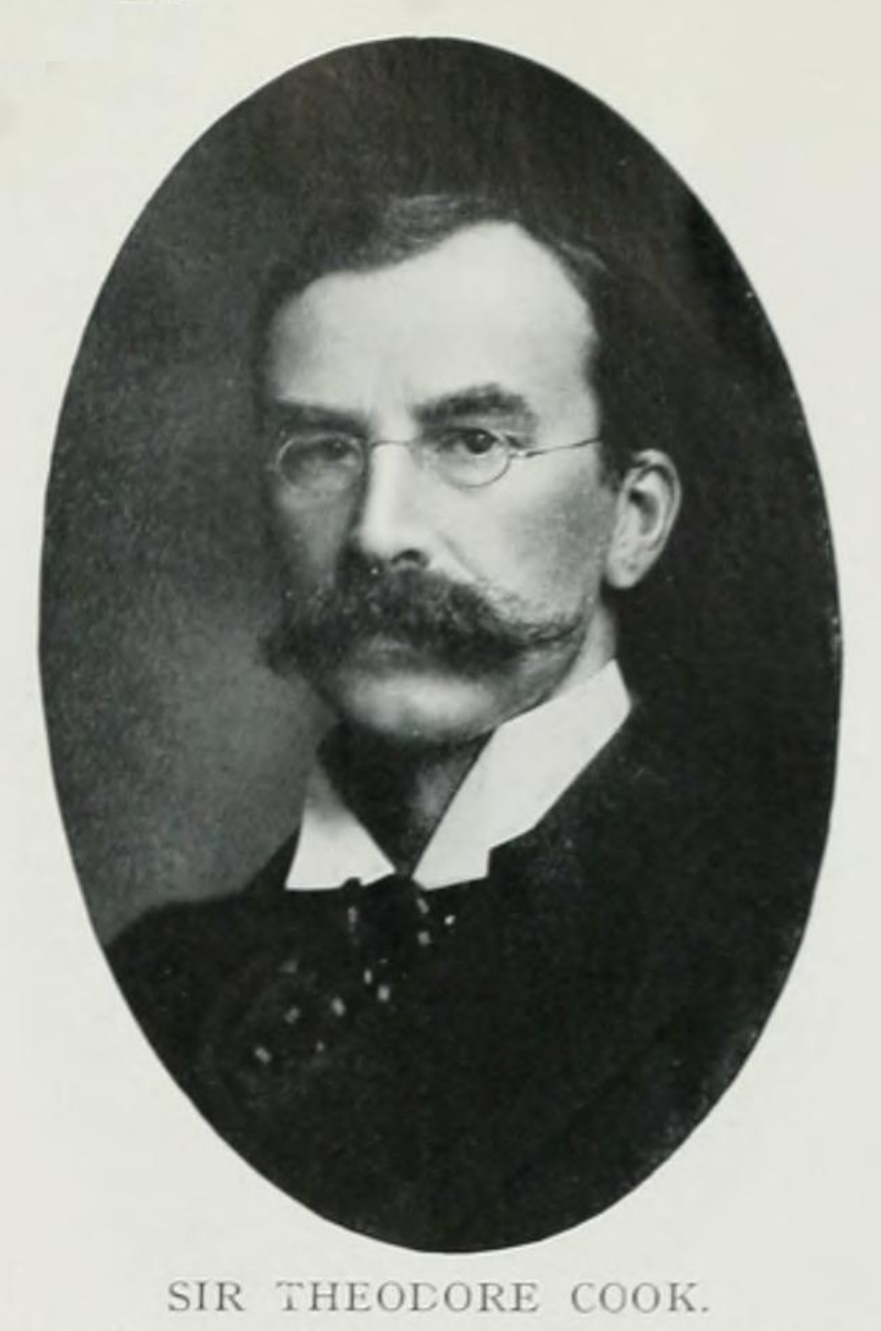
- Theodore Cook, photographed in about 1922.
- Born: 28 March 1867; Wantage, United Kingdom
- Died: 16 September 1928 (aged 61)
- Occupations: Writer and art critic
- Parent(s): Henry Cook (father); Jane Elizabeth Cook (mother)

Olympic medal record

Art competitions
Silver medal – second place	1920 Antwerp	Literature

Sir Theodore Andrea Cook (28 March 1867 – 16 September 1928) was a British art critic and writer.

== Sporting activities ==
Theodore Cook spent his early years in Wantage after his father, Henry Cook, became the headmaster of King Alfred's School in 1868, a year after his eldest son was born. He subsequently studied at Radley College, where he also pursued sporting activities becoming captain of the football and boating teams. He continued his studies in Classics, at Wadham College, Oxford where he was a member of the boat club, and participated for Oxford in the 1889 Boat Race. He stayed in Oxford after graduation and in 1891 founded the "University Fencing Club". He continued being interested in fencing and was captain of the English Fencing Team in the 1903 championships in Paris and the 1906 championships in Athens. He was involved in the arrangements for the Olympic Games of 1908 in London, being one of the three British representatives on the International Olympic Committee.

He won a silver medal in the art competitions at the 1920 Olympic Games for his "Olympic Games of Antwerp".

== Activity as writer and publisher ==
Theodore Cook's legacy from his artist mother was an early introduction to the world of paintings, sculpture and architecture. This inspired him to travel particularly in Europe and to publish authoritative works on Old Provence, 25 Great Houses of France, Leonardo da Vinci, and sculpture, among many others, some of which were illustrated by his mother.

This led Cook into journalism. He was for some years editor of the St. James Gazette, the paper edited "for gentlemen by gentlemen". As a freelance he wrote for the old Standard and contributed to the Daily Telegraph articles on rowing by "An Old Blue".

In 1910, he became editor of The Field, the County Gentleman's Newspaper, a position he still held at the time of his death in 1928.

His knighthood in 1916 was, in his opinion, a recognition of the work for the war effort by his magazine rather than of his own individual contribution. He died of a heart attack on 16 September 1928, aged 61.

== Books ==
- Notes on tobogganing at St. Moritz, New York, 1894
- A History of the English Turf- London, 1901
- An Anthology of Humorous Verse – London, 1902
- Spirals in Nature and Art – London, 1903
- The Water-Colour Drawings of J.M.W.TURNER, in the National Gallery, London, 1904.
- Twenty-five Great Houses of France
- Eclipse-1775, Persommon-1906 – London, 1907
- The Official Report of the Olympic Games of 1908 – London, 1908
- Cook, Theodore Andrea; Nickalls, Guy (1908). Thomas Doggett Deceased. London: Archibald Constable.
- The Story of the Rouen – London, 1911
- Old Touraine. The Life and History of the Famous Chateaux of France 2 volumes ISBN 0-7103-0989-9
- Old Provence. 2 volumes – London 1905
- The Curves of Life – London, 1914 ISBN 978-0-486-23701-5
- The Sunlit Hours – London, 1926
- Character and Sportsmanship – London 1926
- International Sport - London 1909

== Sources ==
- Margaret Prentice – Sir Theodore Andrea Cook, sometime of Wantage
- Obituary – The Times, 18 September 1928
- Obituary – The Field, 20 September 1928
