= Henriette Brossin de Polanska =

French painter

Medal record

Art competitions

Representing France

Olympic Games
Silver medal – second place	1920 Antwerp	Painting

Ève Henriette Brossin de Mère de Polanska (Blanska) (1878–1954) was a French/Swiss painter.

She was born on July 14, 1878, in Kharkiv, Ukraine. A naturalized Swiss citizen, she died in 1954 in Zurich, Switzerland.

In 1920 Brossin represented France in the art competitions of the Olympic Games winning a silver medal for work "L'élan" ("The Jump"). (That year, art competitions were held as part of the 1920 Summer Olympics in Antwerp, Belgium. Medals were awarded in five categories (architecture, literature, music, painting, and sculpture), for works inspired by sport-related themes.)
