= Geoffrey Moull =

Canadian professional conductor

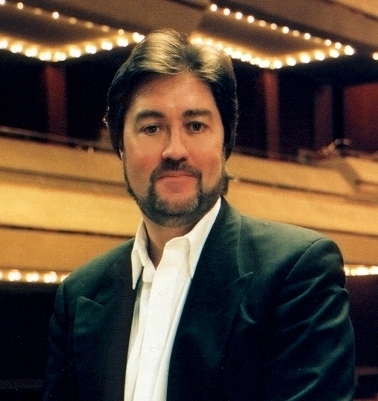

Geoffrey Moull is a Canadian professional conductor. He was principal conductor of the Bielefeld Philharmonic Orchestra and music director of the Thunder Bay Symphony Orchestra.

== Education ==
Geoffrey Moull was born in London, Ontario, Canada and studied conducting with Kirill Kondrashin, Sergiu Celibidache and Martin Stephani. He holds a Bachelor of Music degree in performance from McGill University and post-graduate degrees in conducting and piano from the Hochschule für Musik Detmold in Germany.

== Career ==
Moull was Principal Conductor and coach of the Trier Opera and Symphony Orchestra in Germany from 1986 to 1989, conducting both opera and concert performances, and was additionally responsible for the development of music education programs and school concerts. He was Associate Conductor of the Münster Symphony Orchestra and Opera from 1989 to 1992. The opera magazine Opernwelt presented Moull with their 'Production of the Year' award in 1992 for Francesco Cavalli's "La Calisto".

With his appointment as Principal Conductor of the Bielefeld Philharmonic Orchestra and Bielefeld Opera in Germany in 1992, Moull became a part of the 'Bielefelder Opernwunder'. He initiated and conducted new productions of works of Wolfgang Amadeus Mozart, Giuseppe Verdi, Giacomo Puccini, Richard Wagner and Richard Strauss. Moull was responsible for the reintroduction of a number of operatic pieces, including Robert Schumann's "Genoveva", Bohuslav Martinů's "Julietta" and Gustav Mahler's completion of Carl Maria von Weber's "Die drei Pintos". He also conducted works of 20th-century composers Kurt Weill, Franz Schreker and Ernst Krenek, and first performances of contemporaries Shulamit Ran, Nikolai Karetnikov and Michael Hirsch.

Moull worked with stage directors John Dew, Jonathan Eaton, Hellmut Matiasek, Gabriele Rech and Katja Czellnik. With the Bielefeld Philharmonic Orchestra Moull led concert performances of Ludwig van Beethoven and Johannes Brahms, introducing the Bielefeld concert audience to symphonic works of composers Bohuslav Martinů and Hugo Alfvén, and designing and conducting many family concert programs.

From 2000 to 2009, Moull was music director of the Thunder Bay Symphony Orchestra. During his tenure, the TBSO expanded its artistic activities and was financially stable, eventually performing about 50 concerts per season with an annual budget of $1.5 million. Moull was responsible for programming and conducting five concert series (Masterworks, Classical Plus, Pops, Cabaret, Family), including complete cycles of the works of Bach, Mozart, Beethoven, Schubert, Dvorak, Brahms and Tchaikovsky.

Moull was also music director of the Thunder Bay Symphony Chorus, performing oratorios from Bach to Orff. Each year since 2001, the TBSO was recorded and broadcast nationally on CBC Radio Two. Those broadcasts included performances of Ludwig van Beethoven's Symphony No. 7, Robert Schumann's Violin Concerto with James Ehnes, Dmitri Shostakovich's Piano Concerto No. 1 with Marc-André Hamelin, Franz Schubert's Symphony No. 6, Igor Stravinsky's Pulcinella, Samuel Barber's Cello Concerto with Denise Djokic and Harry Freedman's Manipulating Mario. The Thunder Bay Regional Arts Council presented its Award to Education in May 2003 to Moull and the TBSO for innovative educational and outreach programs ("Community Bridges", "Side-by-Side", "Music in the Classroom" and "Stars of the Future") that attracted thousands of new audience members each year. Each season Moull took the orchestra on a tour of Northwestern Ontario, bringing symphonic music to Kenora, Dryden, Fort Frances, Sioux Lookout, Red Lake, Marathon, Manitouwadge and Wawa. In 2008, Moull and the TBSO collaborated with the Minnesota Ballet, performing Tchaikovsky's The Nutcracker. On the occasion of Moull's final concert with the TBSO as music director in 2009, Moull's vision and the orchestra's accomplishments were lauded in an article in the Lake Superior News.

== Recordings ==
In 1993 Moull recorded the world premiere of Nikolai Karetnikov's Till Eulenspiegel. In 1994 Moull recorded Louis Spohr's Faust for CPO with the Bielefeld Opera. This world-premiere recording attracted international attention and was released to critical acclaim.

Moull recorded Theo Loevendie's opera "Esmeé" for Donemus with the Bielefeld Opera in 1998. Loevendie composed the work for the Holland Festival; Moull and the Bielefeld Opera were the first to perform the opera outside of the Netherlands, and the first to record it.

In 2004, Moull initiated a plan to produce a CD-recording with the Thunder Bay Symphony Orchestra. The resulting disc, "Variations on a Memory", features five contemporary compositions (works of John Estacio, Jeffrey Ryan, Regent Levasseur, Alexina Louie and Aris Carastathis) that have played a role in the development of the orchestra. In 2005, the CD was awarded an international distribution to radio broadcasters by the SOCAN Foundation and a Juno Award nomination for Jeffrey Ryan's Pangaea. The Canadian Music Centre announced that "Variations on a Memory" was their top seller for 2005, and the recording was praised by Gramophone magazine.

== Guest conducting ==
Geoffrey Moull is a frequent guest conductor of orchestras and opera companies in Europe and North America, including the Radio Filharmonisch Orkest of the Netherlands, the Komische Oper Berlin, the Calgary Philharmonic Orchestra, the Staatsoper Hannover, the Meininger Hofkapelle, the CBC Radio Orchestra, the Orchestre National des Pays de la Loire, the Edmonton Symphony Orchestra, the Winnipeg Symphony Orchestra, Opéra-Théâtre de Metz, Deutsche Oper am Rhein, the Orchestra of the Southern Finger Lakes, Grand Théâtre de la Ville de Luxembourg, the Kitchener-Waterloo Symphony, Orchestra London, Symphony Nova Scotia, the San Remo Symphony, the Springfield Symphony Orchestra, the Szombathely Symphony and the Internationale Maifestspiele Wiesbaden.

== Teaching positions ==
From 1985 to 1994 he was the director of a series of conducting seminars given by the Bavarian Music Council in Hof and Markt Oberdorf, Germany. From 1990 to 1992 Moull was music director of the Musikhochschule Münster Symphony Orchestra at the University of Münster. In 1998, he gave master classes in operatic conducting, coaching and singing at the University of Southern California, and was guest conductor of the McGill Symphony Orchestra in 2000. From 2008 to 2009 Moull was Mentor, Coach and Pianist of the Opera Program at Wilfrid Laurier University and in 2010 he was appointed visiting professor of the Hochschule für Musik Detmold. From 2010 to 2012 Moull was Visiting Professor and Director of Orchestras at The University of Western Ontario. His responsibilities included conducting the UWO Symphony Orchestra, the UWO Chamber Orchestra, UWO Opera productions and teaching conducting and piano.
