= Oreste Riva =

Italian composer

Olympic medal record

Art competitions
Silver medal – second place	1920 Antwerp	Music

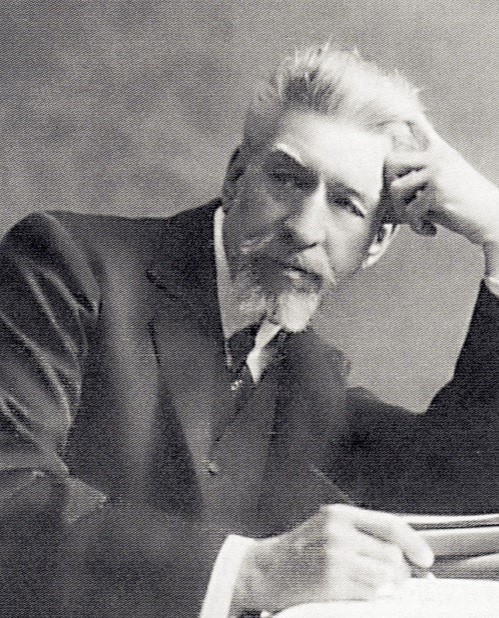
Picture of Oreste Riva

Oreste Riva (21 July 1860 – 31 December 1936) was an Italian composer. In 1920 he won a silver medal in the art competitions of the Olympic Games for his "Marcia trionfale" ("Triumphal March").

== Bibliography ==
- Marino Anesa: Dizionario della musica italian per banda - Biografie dei compositori e catalogo delle opere dal 1800 al 1945, 1993, 514 pp.
- Paul E. Bierley, William H. Rehrig: The heritage encyclopedia of band music: composers and their music, Westerville, Ohio: Integrity Press, 1991 ISBN 0918048087
- Carlo Schmidl: Dizionario universale dei musicisti: Supplemento, Milan: Sonzogno, 1938, 806 pp.
- Franz Stieger: Opernlexikon - Teil II: Komponisten. 1, Band A-F, Tutzing: Hans Schneider, 1975–1983, 371 pp. ISBN 3795202035
- Franz Stieger: Opernlexikon - Teil II: Komponisten. 2, Band G-M, Tutzing: Hans Schneider, 1975–1983, 373-772 pp. ISBN 3795202280
- Wolfgang Suppan, Armin Suppan: Das Neue Lexikon des Blasmusikwesens, 4th edn., Freiburg-Tiengen, Blasmusikverlag Schulz GmbH, 1994 ISBN 3923058071
