= Simon Goossens =

Belgian sculptor (1893–1964)

Olympic medal record[

Art competitions
Silver medal – second place	1920 Antwerp	Sculpture

Simon Goossens (15 June 1893 – 10 October 1964) was a Belgian sculptor. In 1920 he won a silver medal in the art competitions of the Antwerp Olympic Games for his "Les Patineurs" ("Skaters").
