= Maurice Bladel =

Belgian writer (1886–1968)

- Born: 12 February 1886; Belgium
- Died: 14 February 1968 (aged 82)
- Occupation: Writer

Olympic medal record

Art competitions
Bronze medal – third place	1920 Antwerp	Literature

Maurice Bladel (12 February 1886 – 14 February 1968) was a Belgian writer. He won a bronze medal at the 1920 Summer Olympics in the mixed literature section of the art competitions.
