= Georges Monier =

Belgian composer (1892–1974)

Olympic medal record

Art competitions
Gold medal – first place	1920 Antwerp	Music

Georges Monier (18 February 1892 – 1974) was a Belgian composer. He won a gold medal in the art competitions of the 1920 Olympic Games for his "Olympique" ("Olympic").

He was a co-founder of arts weekly-journal 7 Arts and led its musical section.
