= Alfred Ost =

Belgian artist and illustrator (1884–1945)

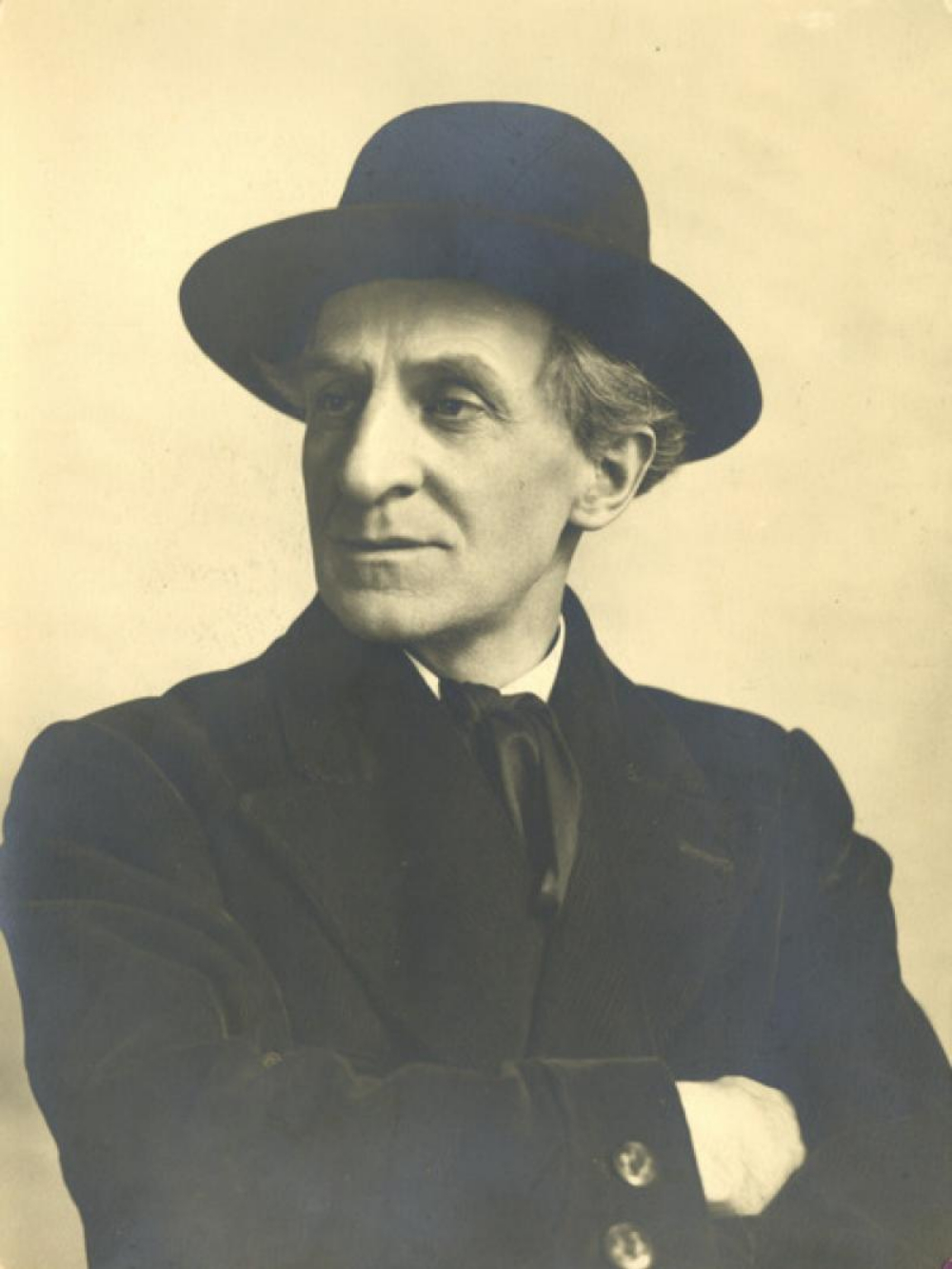
- Portrait of Alfred Ost with hatt, 1930s
- Born: 14 February 1884; Zwijndrecht
- Died: 9 October 1945 (aged 61); Antwerp
- Known for: Painting, drawing, illustration, poster
- Notable work: Murals in Xaverius College, Borgerhout, Antwerp.
- Awards: Bronze Medal 1920 Antwerp Olympics Art Competition

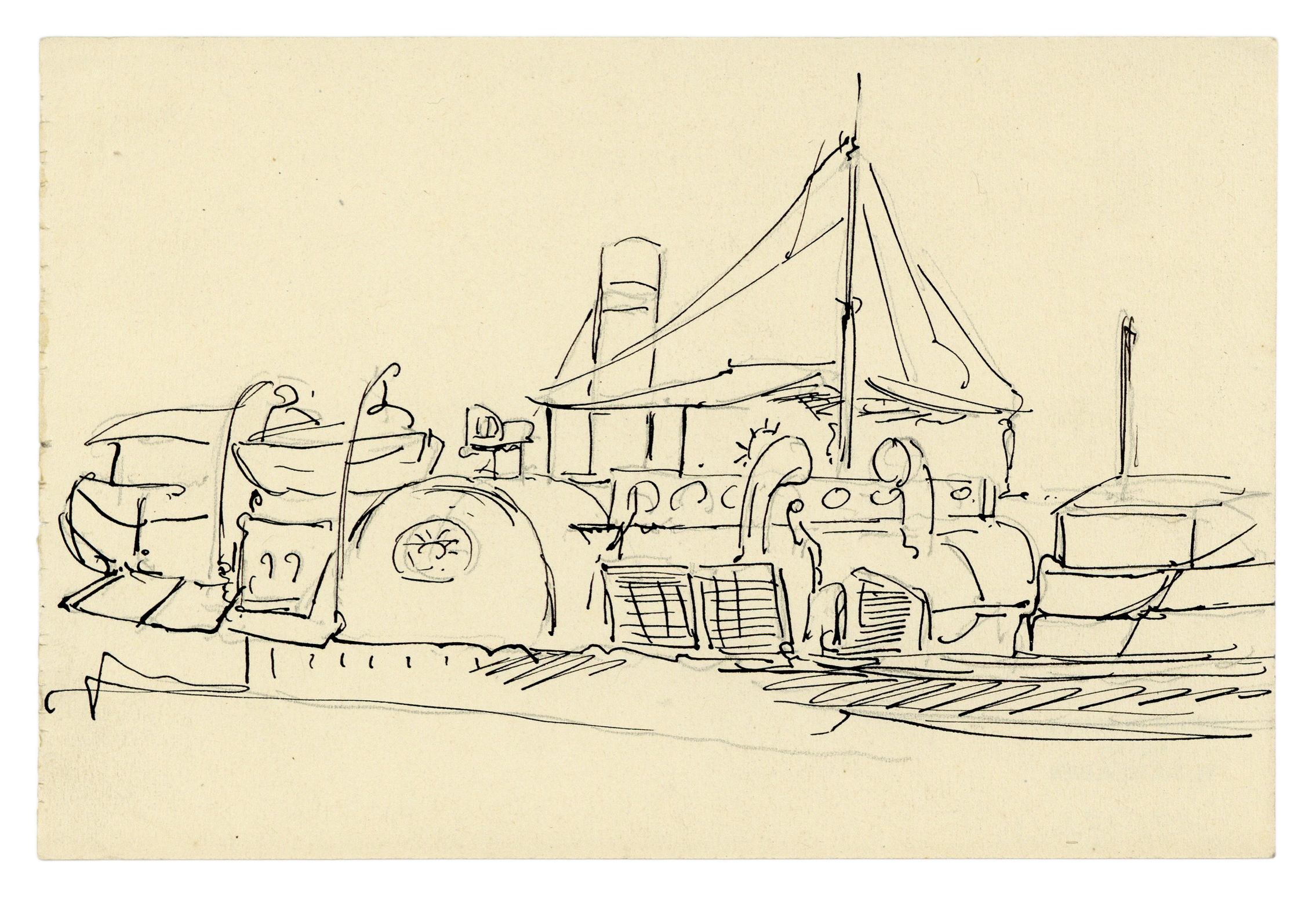
Ink drawing of a ship (1925)

Alfred Ost (14 February 1884, Zwijndrecht – 9 October 1945, Antwerp) was a Belgian designer, watercolorist, illustrator, painter, draftsman and political cartoonist. After his first drawings, of a descriptive realism of animals and genre scenes, he addressed religious themes transposed into a contemporary popular context. He became known as an animal painter and poster designer. His war experiences, intensified by his bipolar disorder, caused a dark colouring and pessimistic themes to be introduced into his art works. During World War I (1914 to 1918) he lived in Amsterdam, where he was influenced by new avant-garde movements. He developed a personal style, first informed by his social engagement, and later by mystical themes.

== Life ==
Ost was born in Zwijndrecht near Antwerp, the son of Isidoor Ost (Mechelen, 1847), a coal merchant and Barbara Hamendt (Rupelmonde, 1846). He was the fourth in a family of five children. His family often moved residence. In 1892 the family was registered in Willebroek. Alfred attended there for three years (from 1892 to 1894) the municipal boys' school. In 1895, he left with his brother Urbain for the boarding school 'Institut Saint Berthuin' in Malonne near Namur. Here he would learn French.

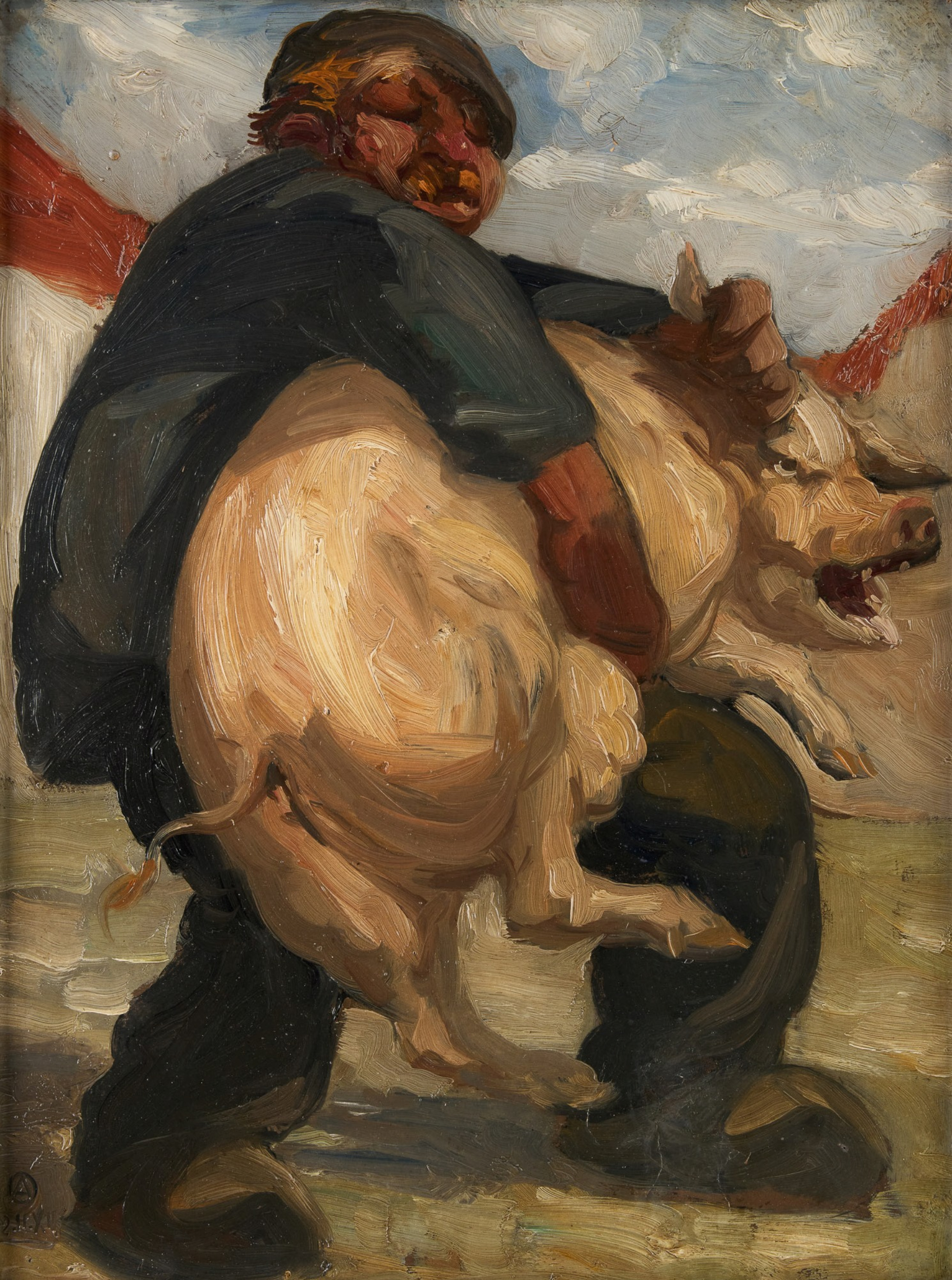
The pig seller

From 1898 to 1901 Ost studied at the Minor Seminary in Hoogstraten. His humanities studies did not suit him as he wished to go to the art academy to become an artist. He was permitted to attend drawing classes at the Antwerp Academy in 1901. The following summer, in 1902, the Ost family left for Mechelen, from which the children had a better train connection to the cities in which they studied.

In 1920 he won a bronze medal at the art competition of the Antwerp Olympic Games for his poster Soccer player.

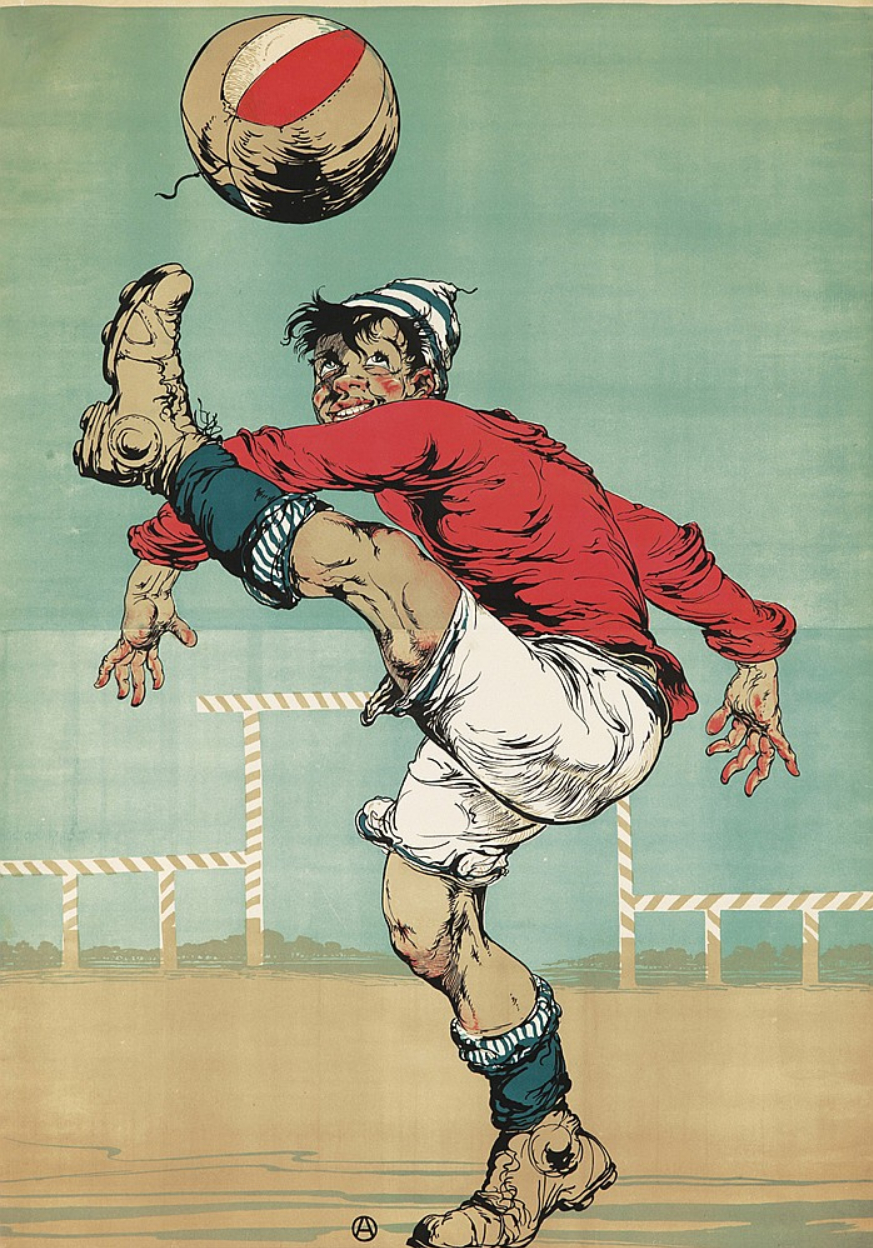
Soccer player, awarded bronze medal at 1920 Olympic art competition

During the Second World War he found it difficult to adapt to rationing, often losing his ration coupons for food and other necessities. He found shelter, food, and help exchanging his coupons with the Jesuit priests running Xaverius College in Borgerhout, Antwerp. In exchange for the help, he offered a piece of work of a religious nature. The Jesuits liked the work and ordered another, this time for above the entrance of one of the doors leading to a chapel. As there were many positive reactions and a lot of fascination with the style, power, and dynamism of his art, he was asked to make murals throughout the college. The artwork depicts the life of Francis Xavier, the patron saint of the college, and Jesuits active in the college. Because of the war, there was no paint available, so his murals were made with charcoal and woodcoal sticks. Much later, a protective layer was added and today the paintings are still kept at the college.

== Bibliography ==
- M. Bafcop, Mechelen in het oeuvre van A. Ost, Mechelen, 1980
- Paul van Crombruggen, Bloemen uit den Besloten Hof, with plates by Alfred Ost, Pierredirix, Antwerpen, 1940(?)
- Pol De Mont, De schilderkunst in België van 1830 tot 1921, 's-Gravenhage, 1921
- A. De Neef, Een rondleiding langs de muurtekeningen van Alfred Ost in het Xaveriuscollege te Borgerhout, 1971
- Léopold Godenne, Les Processions Cortèges - Calvalcades De Malines, Willy Godenne, Bruxelles, 48 pp, 1938
- H. J. Haverkate, Alfred Ost - het Vlaamse genie, Ons Amsterdam 41, pp 166–186, 1989
- Bart Huysmans, Alfred Ost, Amssoms Wilrijk, 40 pp, 1991
- Jan Mercelis, Lithographie: tentoonstelling plakkaten, Hoogstraten, 1984
- Jan Mercelis and R. Raymaekers, Alfred Ost 1884-1945, Brussel, 1988
- Jan Mercelis (conservator Stedelijk Museum te Hoogstraten), Ost-info, quarterly publication 1984–2006, 82 issues
- Frans Mertens, Alfred Ost, verheerlijken en beveiliger van het Mechelse Stede- en Monumentenschoon, Handelingen van de Kon. Kring voor Oudheidkunde, Letteren en Kunst van Mechelen 66, pp. 157–176, 1962
- Frans Mertens, Alfred Ost, Uitgeverij De Vroente, Kasterlee, 1971, 336 pp.
- Frans Mertens, Geïllustreerde inventaris van tekeningen, aquarellen en plakkaten, Alfred Ostzaal, Koninklijke Maatschappij voor Dierkunde van Antwerpen, 1971
- Frans Mertens, De legendarische Ost, Liber Amicorum Jozef Lauwerys, Hoogstraten, 88 pp., 1973 (with 40 illustrations in colour)
- R. van Passen, Kunstschilder Alfred Ost, Leuven, 1947
- J. Philippen, De bedevaartvaantjes van Alfred Ost, quarterly publication De Brabantse Folklore, March 1983, nr 237, pp. 20–54 (9 black and white illustrations including a photo of Alfred Ost)
- G. Prieels, De vrouw in het oeuvre van A. Ost, Gent 1981
- K. Scheldeman, A. Ost in Borgerhout, elf herinneringen, Heemkundig handboekje voor de Antwerpse regio, 1985
- René Turkry, Het religieuze werk van A. Ost, Mechelen, 1984
- René Turkry, Beeld van de Kempen. 100 jaar Alfred Ost, Mechelen, 1984
- René Turkry, Floralia. Bloemen-planten door Alfred Ost, Brussel, 1990
- Karl Scheerlinck, De affiches van Alfred Ost - Een voorsmaakje, Verstraelen, Borgerhout, 32 pp., 1995
- Karl Scheerlinck, Alfred Ost 1884-1945 - Oeuvrecatalogus affiches/posters, publ. Pandora/Snoeck Ducaju & Zoon, 1997
- Karl Scheerlinck, Prentbriefkaarten Alfred Ost - Oeuvrecatalogus, publ. Plakkaat & Co Antwerpen, 272 pp. (over 400 illustrations), 2020
