= Art competitions at the 1920 Summer Olympics =

Art competitions at the Olympics

Art competitions at the Games of the VII Olympiad
- Art competitions pictogram
- Venue: Antwerp
- Dates: 23 April – 12 September 1920
- No. of events: 5
- Competitors: 11 from 5 nations

Art competitions were held as part of the 1920 Summer Olympics in Antwerp, Belgium. Medals were awarded in five categories (architecture, literature, music, painting, and sculpture), for works inspired by sport-related themes.

Art competitions were part of the Olympic program from 1912 to 1948, but were discontinued due to concerns about amateurism and professionalism. Since 1952, a non-competitive art and cultural festival has been associated with each Games.

== Medal summary ==
Category	Gold	Silver	Bronze
Architecture	none awarded	Holger Sinding-Larsen (NOR); Project for a gymnastics school	none awarded
Literature	Raniero Nicolai (ITA) "Canzoni Olimpioniche"	Theodore Andrea Cook (GBR) "Olympic Games of Antwerp"	Maurice Bladel (BEL) "La Louange des Dieux"
Music	Georges Monier (BEL) "Olympique"	Oreste Riva (ITA) "Marcia trionfale"	none awarded
Painting	none awarded	Henriette Brossin de Polanska (FRA) "L'élan"	Alfred Ost (BEL) "Joueur de Football"
Sculpture	Albéric Collin (BEL) "La Force"	Simon Goossens (BEL) "Les Patineurs"	Alphons De Cuyper (BEL) "Lanceur de Poids" and "Coureur"

== Medal table ==
At the time, medals were awarded to these artists, but art competitions are no longer regarded as official Olympic events by the International Olympic Committee. These events do not appear in the IOC medal database, and these totals are not included in the IOC's medal table for the 1920 Games.

Rank	Nation	Gold	Silver	Bronze	Total
1	Belgium (BEL)	2	1	3	6
2	Italy (ITA)	1	1	0	2
3	France (FRA)	0	1	0	1
3	Great Britain (GBR)	0	1	0	1
3	Norway (NOR)	0	1	0	1
Totals (5 entries)		3	5	3	11

== Events summary ==
=== Architecture ===
The following architects took part:

Rank	Name	Country
1	not awarded	
2	Holger Sinding-Larsen	Norway

=== Literature ===
The following writers took part:

Rank	Name	Country
1	Raniero Nicolai	Italy
2	Theodore Andrea Cook	Great Britain
3	Maurice Bladel	Belgium

=== Music ===
The following composers took part:

Rank	Name	Country
1	Georges Monier	Belgium
2	Oreste Riva	Italy

=== Painting ===
The following painters took part:

Rank	Name	Country
1	not awarded	
2	Henriette Brossin de Mère-de Polanska	France
3	Alfred Ost	Belgium

=== Sculpture ===
The following sculptors took part:

Rank	Name	Country
1	Albéric Collin	Belgium
2	Simon Goossens	Belgium
3	Alphonse De Cuyper	Belgium

== Sources ==
- Olympic Games Antwerp 1920 — Official Report (PDF) (in French). Belgian Olympic Committee. 1957. p. 80. Archived (PDF) from the original on 8 April 2008.
- Wagner, Juergen. "Olympic Art Competition 1920". Olympic Games Museum. Archived from the original on 1 May 2008.
- Kramer, Bernhard (May 2004). "In Search of the Lost Champions of the Olympic Art Contests" (PDF). Journal of Olympic History. 12 (2): 29–34. Archived (PDF) from the original on 10 April 2008.
