= Albéric Collin =

Belgian sculptor (1886–1962

Olympic medal record

Art competitions
Gold medal – first place	1920 Antwerp	Sculpture

Albéric Collin (6 April 1886 – 27 February 1962) was a Belgian animalier sculptor and pastel artist.

== Biography ==
Collin was born in Antwerp and was educated there, training in the Royal Academy of Fine Arts in Antwerp, where among his teachers was Josuë Dupon. He was a member of the Antwerp Group. He was a close friend of the Italian animalier Rembrandt Bugatti, who was based in Antwerp for several years before World War I. Like Bugatti, Collin frequented Antwerp Zoo, which was for him an inexhaustible source of inspiration.

== Work ==
Collin's oeuvre, except for his youngest years, consisted exclusively of prolific sculpted animals, both wild and domestic. His statuettes were often cast in bronze by the lost wax process.

His most visible works are the 12 elephants created for a bridge in Antwerp in 1930 and his Éléphant monté par des Noirs ("Elephant mounted by blacks"), a monumental sculpture in concrete, created on the occasion of the Brussels International Exposition (1935) and exhibited in front of the pavilion of the Belgian Congo designed by René Schoentjes. The figures of the black Africans represent members of the Mangbetu people. After the end of the exhibition the sculpture was set up opposite the Royal Museum for Central Africa at Tervuren.

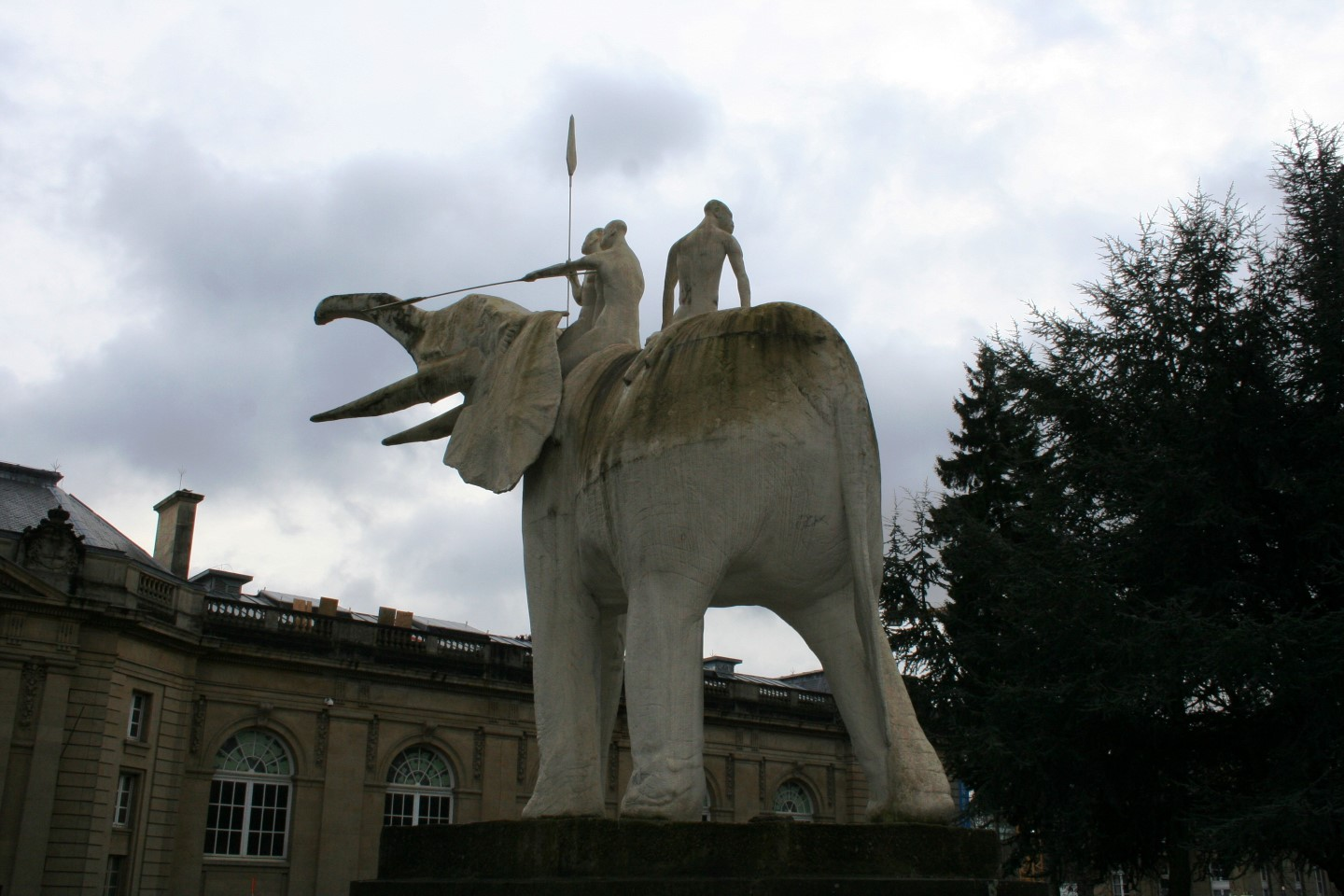
Elephant in front of the museum at Tervuren

== Prizes ==
=== Salons ===
- 1921: gold medal at the Salon des Indépendants, Paris
- 1922: bronze medal at the Salon des artistes français, Paris

=== Olympics ===
In 1920 Collin won a gold medal in the art competition of the Olympic Games held in Antwerp for his sculpture "La Force" ("Strength").
