= Hans Neuenfels =

German writer and opera director (1941–2022)

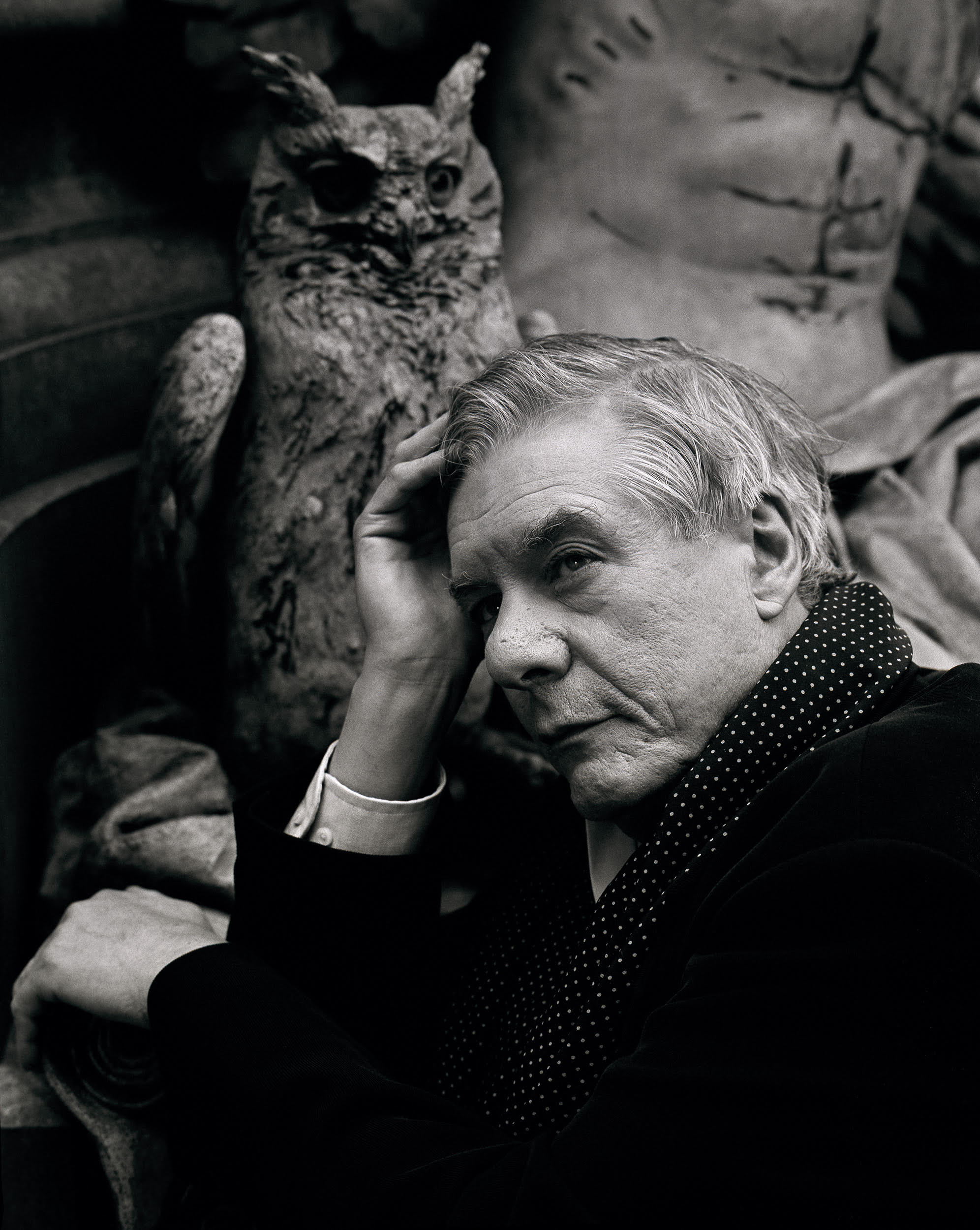
- Hans Neuenfels in 2006
- Born: 31 May 1941; Krefeld, Rhineland, Prussia, Nazi Germany
- Died: 6 February 2022 (aged 80); Berlin, Germany
- Education: Folkwang Hochschule; Max Reinhardt Seminar
- Occupations: Theatre director; Opera director; Theatre manager; Film producer; Writer
- Organizations: Volksbühne
- Spouse: Elisabeth Trissenaar
- Awards: Director of the Year; Der Faust

Hans Neuenfels (German pronunciation: [hans ˈnɔʏənfɛls]; 31 May 1941 – 6 February 2022) was a German writer, poet, film producer, librettist, theatre director, opera director and theatre manager. As a director, he first focused on drama, staged at prominent houses such as the Vienna Burgtheater, and became a leading exponent of German Regietheater. From 1974, he turned to opera, looking for "the subliminal of the music and the interlinear of the texts", for "surprisingly new, sometimes even disturbingly ambivalent perspectives on the works".

Some of his opera productions caused controversies, such as Verdi's Aida at the Oper Frankfurt in 1980 where he staged the title character as a contemporary cleaning lady. In Mozart's Idomeneo at the Deutsche Oper Berlin in 2006, he was accused of offending Islam, and in Wagner's Lohengrin at the Bayreuth Festival in 2010, he dressed the choir as laboratory rats. He received the Der Faust award for his life's achievements in 2016, and is regarded as one of the most inventive directors of his generation.

== Life and career ==
Born in Krefeld, Neuenfels published prose and poetry already as a young man. He was influenced by meeting Max Ernst, for whom he served as secretary.

He studied drama and directing at the Folkwang Hochschule in Essen from 1961 to 1964, and at the Max Reinhardt Seminar in Vienna in the 1960s, where he met his future wife, actress Elisabeth Trissenaar. He worked in Heidelberg, Darmstadt, Basel, Cologne, and from 1972 at the Schauspiel Frankfurt, where he shaped the company's theatre in codetermination (Mitbestimmungstheater) together with intendant Peter Palitzsch.

In the 1970s he established himself as a leading exponent of German Regietheater. Being invited to prominent venues, such as the Burgtheater, his productions were often controversially received. He worked with well-known actors including Klaus Maria Brandauer and Anne Bennent, directing Kleists Penthesilea at the Schillertheater in Berlin, with Trissenaar in the title role, and Shakespeare's Ein Sommernachtstraum with Bernhard Minetti also there. At the Burgtheater, he directed Kleist's Das Käthchen von Heilbronn, and at the Schauspielhaus Zürich Wedekind's Lulu. From 1986 to 1990, Neuenfels was general manager at the Volksbühne Berlin.

=== Opera ===
In 1974, the first opera directed by Neuenfels was Verdi's Il trovatore at the Staatstheater Nürnberg. It showed already his specific view on works of the standard repertoire: "tracing the subliminal of the music and the interlinear of the texts and thus often opening surprisingly new, sometimes even disturbingly ambivalent perspectives" ("... die dem Unterschwelligen der Musik und dem Zwischenzeiligen der Texte nachspürte und so oft überraschend neue, ja zuweilen verstörend ambivalente Perspektiven auf die Werke eröffnete"). His opera productions were often accompanied by heated discussions and scandals. When Schreker's Die Gezeichneten was revived at the Oper Frankfurt, conducted by Michael Gielen, he staged it as "drug intoxication, with heroin syringe in the station toilet" ("Drogenrausch mit Heroinspritze auf der Bahnhofstoilette"). In Verdi's Aida there in 1980, he portrayed the Ethiopian slave as a cleaning woman in a contemporary setting, going for what he called an archaeology of the unconscious ("Archäologie des Unbewussten"). His 1998 production of Mozart's Die Entführung aus dem Serail at the Staatsoper Stuttgart was awarded the Bavarian Theatre Prize.

Neuenfels directed at the Salzburg Festival first in 2000, Mozart's Così fan tutte. The soprano Karita Mattila, portraying Fiordiligi, criticised him for sexually explicit interpretation and too little focus on the singers: in a prologue, huge insects and background videos, some of them erotic, distracted attention from the singers, and during Fiordiligi's aria "Come scoglio", Mattila arrived onstage walking two men, in leather and chains, as if they were dogs. She called that the worst experience and said she believed Neuenfels had crossed the line.

When he returned to the festival for Die Fledermaus by Johann Strauss the following year, he provoked again angry reactions and resentment.

In December 2003, his production of Mozart's Idomeneo at the Deutsche Oper Berlin included a scene in which the title character staggers on stage carrying the severed heads of Neptune, Jesus and Buddha. When the production was planned to be repeated in September 2006, then adding the head of Muhammad, the police warned that it might present a security risk, and the opera house cancelled the performances. Following protests that the opera house was engaging in self-censorship, its manager, Kirsten Harms, rescheduled those performances for December that year.

Neuenfels directed at the Bayreuth Festival first in 2010 with Wagner's Lohengrin, conducted by Andris Nelsons. This production set the opera in a laboratory and featured chorus members costumed as lab rats. The audience reaction at the premiere ranged from enthusiastic applause to irate booing. According to Der Spiegel, Neuenfels merely smiled and shrugged after taking his curtain calls. The same year, he directed Simon Mayr's Medea, a neglected opera.

On 31 January 2016, he directed the world premiere of Miroslav Srnka's South Pole commissioned by the Bavarian State Opera in Munich, conducted by Kirill Petrenko.

=== Personal life and death ===
While studying in Vienna, Neuenfels and Elisabeth Trissenaar met, and married. Their son, Benedict Neuenfels, is a cinematographer. They lived in Berlin and owned a summer residence in Altaussee, Austria. Neuenfels wrote a novel, Isaakaros, published in 1991. A collection of his essays, Wie viel Musik braucht der Mensch? was published in 2009, and an autobiography, Das Bastardbuch, in 2011.

Neuenfels died from COVID-19 in Berlin on 6 February 2022, at the age of 80.

== Awards ==
- 1994 Kainz Medal of Vienna
- 2003 Cicero Speaker Prize
- 2005 Opera Director of the Year, Opernwelt magazine
- 2008 Opera Director of the Year
- 2012 Niederrheinischer Literaturpreis (Lower Rhine literature prize) of Krefeld, for Das Bastardbuch
- 2015 Opera Director of the Year
- 2016 German theatre prize Der Faust, Lifetime Achievement Prize

Since 2006, Neuenfels was a member of the Academy of Arts, Berlin, performing arts section.

== Writings ==
- Poems (1960)
- Mundmündig (1963) OCLC 54257933
- Isaakaros (1991) ISBN 978-3-7017-0718-8, OCLC 25970222
- Neapel oder die Reise nach Stuttgart (2001) ISBN 978-3-902144-15-7, OCLC 48212836
- Das Bastardbuch. Autobiografische Stationen (in German). München: Bertelsmann. 2011. ISBN 978-3-570-58028-8. OCLC 750687081.

== Filmography ==
- 1983: Penthesilea OCLC 865065490
- 1983: Die Familie oder Schroffenstein ISBN 978-3-941540-67-5, OCLC 868363551
- 1984: Die Schwärmer ISBN 978-3-499-15534-5, OCLC 12676646
- 1988: Europa und der zweite Apfel (TV) ISBN 978-3-926175-50-2, OCLC 24561816
- 1990: Das Blinde Ohr der Oper OCLC 604879830
- 1999: Die Entführung aus dem Serail (TV) OCLC 870715227
- 2001: Die Fledermaus (TV) OCLC 315561912
