= Harald Stamm =

German opera singer and voice teacher (born 1938)

- Born: April 29, 1938 (age 88); Frankfurt, Germany
- Occupations: Opera singer; Voice teacher
- Years active: 1968–2009
- Awards: Kammersänger

Harald Stamm (born 29 April 1938) is a German opera singer (bass) and voice teacher.

== Life and career ==
Born in Frankfurt, Stamm grew up in Bingen am Rhein. After the Abitur at the local Stefan-George-Gymnasium and subsequent sport studies, he worked as a teacher and took private singing lessons with Franz Fehringer.

After his graduation Stamm had engagements on the stages of Gelsenkirchen (1968), Kassel and Cologne. In 1973 he became a permanent member of the ensemble of the Hamburgische Staatsoper.

In 1979 he achieved his international breakthrough with Sarastro from The Magic Flute, his signature role, at the Metropolitan Opera. In 1987 he made his debut in Covent Garden as Raimondo in Lucia di Lammermoor.

In 1988 Stamm was appointed Kammersänger by the Senate of the Hanseatic City of Hamburg.

From 1993 to 2003 Stamm was Professor of Singing at the Berlin University of the Arts. Stamm gave his farewell performance at the Hamburg State Opera on 1 June 2009 as Veit Pogner in Wagner's Die Meistersinger von Nürnberg and since then has only been active as a teacher.

== Publications ==
Kraftvoll entspanntes Singen: Anleitung zur Technik nebst einigen Ratschlägen für junge Opern- und Konzertsänger., Taschenbuch, Thiasos Musikverlag, October 2002, ISBN 978-3-98052-446-9
