= 2006 Idomeneo controversy =

Cancellation of performances of an opera featuring the severed head of Muhammad

On 26 September 2006 the Deutsche Oper Berlin announced the cancellation of four performances of Mozart's opera Idomeneo, re di Creta, planned for November 2006, citing concerns that the production's depictions of the severed head of the Islamic prophet Muhammad raised an "incalculable security risk". "To avoid endangering its audience and employees, the management has decided against repeating Idomeneo in November 2006", the opera house said in a press release.

The cancelled performances were revivals of a 2003 Idomeneo production, directed by Hans Neuenfels, which added a final scene in which King Idomeneo staggering on stage carrying a bag of the severed heads of Neptune, Jesus, and Buddha and placing each on chairs; a departure from the libretto, in which the action is set in the aftermath of the Trojan War and only Neptune features in the plot. For the 2006 performances director Neuenfels pointedly added the head of Muhammad. The scene was intended to symbolize the people's release into freedom without gods or idols.

The announcement came in the wake of controversy around Pope Benedict XVI's Regensburg lecture delivered on 12 September 2006. According to the BBC, the German press agency DPA said Berlin police had not so far recorded any direct threat to the opera house. However, The New York Times reported that there was an anonymous threat in August against the theatre.

The cancellation sparked a great deal of debate in Europe on the issue of self-censorship and the nature of free speech in a multicultural community that includes potentially violent Muslims. On 27 September 2006, Germany's Chancellor Angela Merkel stated: "I think the cancellation was a mistake. I think self-censorship does not help us against people who want to practise violence in the name of Islam ... It makes no sense to retreat." Interior Minister Wolfgang Schäuble, after a government-sponsored conference with Muslim representatives held independently of the incident, told reporters that "[t]o send a signal, we could all go to the performance together", and the Muslim representatives agreed that the performance should not be cancelled.

On 18 December 2006, the Berlin Opera staged Mozart's work with the newly added controversial ending scene amid mixed reactions, but no incidents (with a small security force and large foreign media contingent). Demonstrators were present outside, as well, including supporters of religious tolerance and Christian protesters (presumably relating to the inclusion of the severed head of Jesus). Various members of German government attended with German Muslim groups, with the notable exception of the central Muslim Council's general secretary, Aiman Mazyek, who was quoted by Al Jazeera English as saying, "It's part of the concept of freedom of opinion and thought that you also have the right to say you are not going.".
