= Rudolf Mors =

German composer

Rudolf Mors (16 July 1920 – 24 September 1988) was a German composer.

== Life ==
Born in Munich, the son of the composer Richard Mors (1874-1946), a representative of the Munich School around Ludwig Thuille, Mors began his training during the Second World War with Gustav Geierhaas and continued it after his return from Soviet captivity with Joseph Haas and Karl Höller. His graduation from the Munich Academy of Music was honoured with the Richard Strauss Prize of the city of Munich, of which Mors was the first recipient.

In 1951, he became Kapellmeister and composer for the Schauspiel in Ingolstadt, followed by an engagement as First Kapellmeister at the Theater Ulm, where he wrote and premiered the two musical parodies Freiheit in Krähwinkel and Der Weiberstreik in collaboration with the cabaret artist Hanns Dieter Hüsch., also broadcast by ZDF in the sixties, is still occasionally found on playbills today. In 1963, Mors changed to the position of a drama composer at the Bielefeld Theatre, where he could devote himself more to the composition of free works.

In 1983, Mors was awarded the Hans-Werner-Henze-Preis of the Landschaftsverband Westfalen-Lippe for his complete works.

Mors died in Eisingen at the age of 68.

== Work ==
The compositions by Mors include:

=== Instrumental music ===
Orchestral pieces

- The Little Match Girl (Symphonic Fairy Tale Poem after Hans Christian Andersen), WV 1 (1935/36) ca.9', 1993 (Kiel)
- 1. Symphony for Orchestra, WV 4 (burnt by the effects of war; sketches complete and parts partially preserved).
- 2nd Symphony for Orchestra, WV 14 (1953–55) ca.30', 1955 (Ulm)

Concertante

- Lyrische Suite for flute and strings, WV 11a (1950/86) ca.9', 1986 (Bielefeld)
- Concerto for piano and orchestra, WV 24 (1976) ca.30', 1977 (Regensburg)

Chamber music

- Quintet
  - Quintet for horn and string quartet, WV 21 (1972) ca.16', 1973 (Bielefeld)
- Quartets
  - String Quartet in E minor, WV 5 (1939–44) ca.18', 1964 (Bielefeld)
  - 5 Bagatelles for 4 recorders or flute, oboe, clarinet and bassoon, WV 16 (1957) ca.5', 1957 (Lindau)
  - Variations on "Es ist ein Schnitter" for 2 trumpets and 2 trombones, WV 23 (1974) c.8', 1974 (Trebgast)
  - Variations on an own theme for 4 cellos, WV 39 (1987) ca.7', 1987 (Würzburg)
- Duos
  - Sonatine A-Dur für Violine und Klavier, WV 2 (1937) ca.9', 1943 (Munich)
  - Sonate für Violine und Klavier, WV 8 (1949) ca.14', 1950 (Munich)
  - Lyrische Suite für Flöte und Klavier, WV 11 (1950) ca.9', 1950 (Munich)
  - 12 Miniaturen für Violine und Cello, WV 20 (1971) ca.7', 1974 (Bielefeld)
  - Fantasie für Flöte und Akkordeon, WV 28 (1983) ca.3', 1984 (Stuttgart)
  - Sonate für Oboe und Klavier, WV 43 (1984-?) (Fragment) daraus: Adagio für Oboe und Klavier, WV 33 (1984) ca.5', 1989 (Bielefeld) auch als: Adagio für Oboe und Orgel, WV 33, 1985 (Bielefeld)
  - Sonate für Cello und Klavier, WV 37 (1986) ca.6', 1986 (Bielefeld)
  - Sonate für Viola und Klavier, WV 37a (1986/88) ca.6' (Neufassung der Sonate für Cello und Klavier, WV 37), 1988 (Bielefeld)
- Solo
  - Kleine Suite für Alt-Blockflöte, WV 36 (1986) ca.3', 1986 (Bielefeld)

Piano

- Sonate für Klavier zu 4 Händen, WV 13 (1950) ca.12', 1950 (Munich)
- Steinigung, Fantasie für Klavier, WV 26a (1982) ca.11' (Konzertante Fassung des Balletts WV 26), 1983 (Bielefeld)
- Sonate für Klavier, WV 42 (198?) (Fragment) (1. Satz vollendet; ca.3'), 1989 (Bielefeld)

Organ

- Orgel-Fantasie on H-C-A-B, WV 34 (1985) ca.6', 1986 (Bielefeld)
- Kleine Orgi-Suite for Organ, WV 38 (1987) ca.7', 1987 (Bielefeld)

=== Vocal music ===
Choir with Orchestra

- Symphonic Cantata after serious words by Christian Morgenstern for soprano and baritone solo, large choir and orchestra, WV 10 (1950) ca.25; first performed in 1963 by the Oratorienchor Ulm under the conduct of Hans Jakob Haller.
- Pater noster for mezzo-soprano solo, four- to six-part choir and orchestra, WV 27 (1983) ca.6'
- Die Versuchung Jesu, cantata for alto and bass solo, mixed choir and instruments, WV 35 (1985) ca.16', 1989 (Brilon)
- Oratorio based on texts from the Bible, Christian Morgenstern, the Sioux Indians (in the transcription by Jörg Zink), the composer and Jörg Zink for solo voices (soprano, alto, tenor, bass), four- to six-part choir and orchestra, WV 44 (198?-88) (fragment; I.part completed, in II.part the composition breaks off) ca.46', 1992 (Bielefeld)

Choir a cappella

- Morgenstern-Zyklus für großen Chor, WV 9 (1948) ca.11'
- Lieder an den Wind after poems by Christian Morgenstern for soprano solo and three to five-part children's choir (Knaben-, Frauenchor), WV 40 (1987) ca.10'
- Wiegenlied after a text by Clemens Brentano for three to four-part boys', children's or women's choir, WV 41 (1988) ca.3'

Solo singing with orchestra

- Vier Sommerlieder after poems by Hermann Hesse for soprano and orchestra, WV 17a (1960/63) ca.12', 1963 (Ulm)
- Die Flamme, Elementarphantasie after Christian Morgenstern for soprano and large orchestra, WV 19 (1968–70) ca.12', 1971 (Bielefeld).
- Klänge aus dem Orient, Four Lieder after poems by Annette von Droste-Hülshoff for soprano and Orchestra, WV 32a (1984/85) ca.8', 1986 (Göttingen)

Solo singing with several instruments

- Holde Mutter mit dem Kind, text: Martin Knapp, Christmas cantata for flute, violin, voice and piano, WV 7 (1948) ca.8', 1969 (Bielefeld)

Solo singing with piano

- Vier frühe Lieder für Sopran und Klavier, WV 3 (1937-1948) ca.8', 1983 (Bielefeld)
- Drei Lieder aus dem „Totentanz“ nach Gedichten von Christian Morgenstern für dramatischen Alt oder Bariton und Klavier, WV 12 (1950) ca.8', 1950 (Munich)
- Drei Lieder der Nacht nach Gedichten von Christian Morgenstern für Singstimme und Klavier, WV 15 (1953–55) ca.7', 1955 (Ulm)
- Vier Sommerlieder nach Gedichten von Hermann Hesse für Sopran und Klavier, WV 17 (1960) ca.12', 1964 (Regensburg)
- Vom Abend zum Morgen, 4 Lieder nach Gedichten von Christian Morgenstern für Singstimme und Klavier, WV 22 (1973) ca.11', 1974 (Bielefeld)
- Four sacred songs for solo singing in worship with organ accompaniment (also possible with piano), WV 29 (1978–84) ca.7', 1983/84 (Bielefeld)
- Six Lieder after poems by Li Tai-Pe in the transcription by Klabund for lower voice and piano, WV 30 (1983) ca.11', 1984 (Münster)
- Three Lieder after Chinese poems in the German transcription by Klabund for lower voice and piano, WV 31 (1983–84) ca.11', 1984 (Münster)
- Klänge aus dem Orient, Four songs after poems by Annette von Droste-Hülshoff for soprano and piano, WV 32a (1984) ca.8', 1984 (Münster)

Melodramas

- Das kleine Mädchen mit den Schwefelhölzern, arrangement of the Symphonic Fairy Tale Poem from 1935/36 for speaker and piano, WV 1a (1985) ca.9'
- Melodeclamation on Goethe's elegy Ein zärtlich jugendlicher Kummer for speaker and piano or orchestra, WV 6 (1946; Orchestral version 1979) ca.5'

=== Stage work ===
Operas

- Vineta, Opera according to own libretto, WV 18 (1960–67), 1968 (Bielefeld)
- Der Kreidekreis, Opera in four acts based on the play of the same name by Klabund; text arrangement by the composer, WV 25 (1977–82), 1983 (Bielefeld)

Musicals

- Freiheit in Krähwinkel, A free musical by Hanns Dieter Hüsch. Music by Rudolf Mors. Adapted in freedom from a farce by Johann Nestroy, 1957 (Ulm)
- Der Weiber Streik (Lysistrata), A pentatonic musical after Aristophanes by Hanns Dieter Hüsch, 1959 (Ulm)
- Das tapfere Schneiderlein, A fairytale musical by Karlheinz Komm (text), 1972 (Bielefeld)

Ballet

- Steinigung, ballet for chamber danse by Gisa Werkowska, WV 26 (1982) ca.11', 1983 (Bielefeld)

Incidental music

- Der Froschkönig by Friedrich Foster, 1950 (Ingolstadt)
- The Comedy of Errors by William Shakespeare, 1951 (Ingolstadt)
- Othello by William Shakespeare, 1952 (Ulm)
- Leonce und Lena by Georg Büchner, 1953 (Ulm)
- Die kluge Närrin by Lope de Vega, 1954 (Ulm)
- The State of Siege by Albert Camus, 1955 (Ulm)
- Lysistrata by Aristophanes, 1956 (Ulm)
- The Long Christmas Dinner by Thornton Wilder, 1957 (Ulm)
- Bunbury by Oscar Wilde, 1958 (Ulm)
- Antigone by Sophocles, 1959 (Ulm)
- The Maid of Orleans by Friedrich Schiller, 1960 (Ulm)
- Die Geisel by Brendan Behan, 1961 (Ulm)
- Das Käthchen von Heilbronn by Heinrich von Kleist, 1962 (Ulm)
- Die neue Mandragora by Jean Vauthier, 1963 (Ulm)
- Der Besuch der alten Dame by Friedrich Dürrenmatt, 1964 (Bielefeld)
- Don Carlos by Friedrich Schiller, 1965 (Bielefeld)
- Cristinas Heimreise by Hugo von Hofmannsthal, 1966 (Bielefeld)
- The Enchanted by Jean Giraudoux, 1967 (Bielefeld)
- Der gestiefelte Kater by Hermann Stelter, 1968 (Regensburg)
- Halb auf dem Baum by Peter Ustinov, 1969 (Bielefeld)
- August, August by Pavel Kohout, 1970 (Bielefeld)
- The Frogs by Aristophanes, 1971 (Göttingen)
- Die Benachrichtigung. by Václav Havel, 1972 (Bielefeld)
- Der Damenschneider by Georges Feydeau, 1973 (Bielefeld)
- Bremer Freiheit by Rainer Werner Fassbinder, 1974 (Bielefeld)
- Cinderellla by Alexander Gruber, 1975 (Bielefeld)
- The Fire Raisers by Max Frisch, 1976 (Göttingen)
- Ein besserer Herr by Walter Hasenclever, 1977 (Bielefeld)
- The Miser by Molière, 1978 (Bielefeld)
- Henkersnachtmahl by Harald Mueller, 1979 (Bielefeld)
- Arsen und Spitzenhäubchen by Joseph Kesselring, 1980 (Bielefeld)
- Twelfth Night by William Shakespeare, 1981 (Bielefeld)
- Three Sisters, Anton Chekhov, 1982 (Bielefeld)
- Der Bürger will vornehm sein by Molière, 1983 (Bielefeld)
- Totenfloß by Harald Mueller, 1987 (Bielefeld)

not datable:

- Hippolytos by Euripides
- Der gestiefelte Kater by Wolf Dieter Pahlke

Film music In the period from 1954 to 1960, music was composed for agricultural and industrial films for the director Georg Munck. Since an exact order can no longer be reconstructed, the films are listed alphabetically in the following overview.

- Aktuelle Landwirtschaftliche Filmschau, 10.–14. Folge
- Ein Dorf spielt mit. Kulturfilm
- Gesunde Landschaft – Unser Schicksal. Kulturfilm
- Handwerk – Industrie – Film
- Immer hungrig, immer frisch
- In den Himmel gehoben (Bosch in der Landwirtschaft). Industriefilm
- Papiersack
- Pappelzucht
- Und überall Strom. Kulturfilm
- Wachsen Bäume in den Himmel
- Worauf es ankommt. Kulturfilm
- Bielefeld, die freundliche Stadt am Teutoburger Wald. Tonbildschau, Regie: Hans J. Sramek
- Westfalen – Biographie einer Reiselandschaft. Tonbildschau, Regie: Hans J. Sramek
