= Vittorio Gnecchi =

Italian composer (1876–1954)

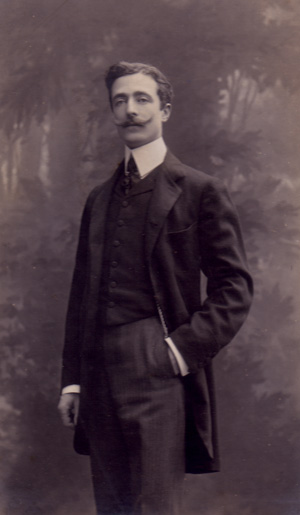
Vittorio Gnecchi

Vittorio Gnecchi (17 July 1876 – 5 February 1954) was an Italian composer.

== Life ==
Vittorio Gnecchi Ruscone was the son of a wealthy industrialist. Thanks to his solid financial position, he was able to take private lessons, and had among his teachers Michele Saladino (who was also the teacher of Pietro Mascagni and Victor de Sabata), Tullio Serafin, Gaetano Coronaro and Carlo Gatti.

As soon as he was nineteen years old, he achieved success with the pastoral action Virtù d'amore, which allowed him to publish his work with the prestigious publisher Ricordi. The next work was the opera Cassandra, whose libretto, taken from Oresteia by Aeschylus, was first set by Gnecchi himself, then entrusted to the librettist Luigi Illica. Cassandra was completed in 1903 and premiered on 5 December 1905 at the Teatro Comunale di Bologna under the direction of Arturo Toscanini with Solomiya Krushelnytska and Giuseppe Borgatti.

Shortly after the first performance of Elektra by Richard Strauss (25 January 1909), an article appeared in Italy by musicologist Giovanni Tebaldini, entitled "Telepatia Musicale". In this article, Cassandra and Elektra were compared, and the author concluded that Strauss must have known Gnecchi's work, and may possibly have plagiarised it. Strauss denied plagiarism and, although there appear to be established correspondence about the work between him and Gnecchi, critics are inclined to believe that the similarities are coincidental. Gnecchi never commented on the case, but his name was linked to it throughout his life. The uproar caused by the article curbed the circulation of Cassandra in Italy, while abroad there were several performances until 1933 (including at the Vienna Volksoper, in Philadelphia and in numerous German theatres). In more recent times, the opera was revived in Montpellier on 13 July 2000 in a concert that resulted in a recording. It then arrived in 2011 at the Teatro Massimo Bellini, with performers Giovanna Casolla (Clytemnestra), John Treleaven (Agamemnon) and Maria Pentcheva (Cassandra) and conductor Donato Renzetti.

Gnecchi's next opera was La Rosiera in 1927, which was followed by the ballet Atlanta (1929). The composer, whose style is characterised by the use of post-wagnerian chromatic harmonies within classical forms, came late to the honours of the Salzburg Festival, in which some of his works were performed, including the Missa Salisburgensis (1933), the Cantata Biblica (1934) and the opera Giuditta (1953), also as Cassandra with a libretto by Illica, the composition of which had begun almost forty years earlier, in 1914.

Gnecchi died in Milan, where he was born, aged 77.

== Compositions ==
=== Operas ===
- Virtù d'amore, pastoral action in two acts, libretto by Maria Rossi Borzotti (private performance at Villa Gnecchi, Verderio di Brianza, Como, 7 October 1896).
- Cassandra, tragedy for music in a prologue and two parts, libretto by Luigi Illica (Teatro Comunale di Bologna, 5 December 1905)
  - Revision: Ferrara 29 February 1909
- La Rosiera, tragic idyll in three acts, libretto by Carlo Zangarini (Preussisches Theater, Gera, 12 February 1927). From On ne badine pas avec l'amour by Alfred de Musset.

The work, after achieving good success abroad (Vienna, Berlin, Prague, Philadelphia, Stockholm), arrived in Italy at the Teatro Lirico Giuseppe Verdi in Trieste on 25 January 1931 and was also seen in Ravenna the following year. The opera, "rich in colour, very elegant in the development of the themes and in the harmonisation" is set at the end of the 18th century and tells the story of the love of two sisters for the same man, Baron Perdicano. Camilla loves Perdicano but rejects him so as not to reveal her feelings; Perdicano then falls in love with Rosetta; Camilla manages to win Perdicano back but Rosetta commits suicide out of despair on the same day as the wedding.

- Giuditta, tragedy (oratorio) in three acts, libretto by Luigi Illica (Salzburg, 1953)

=== Instrumental, orchestral and vocal music ===
- Atalanta, Symphonic ballet of Greek dances (Teatro Lirico Milan, 1929)
- Adagio for cello and piano (Paris, 1929)
- Adagio cantabile, sacred piece for string instruments and organ (Salzburg, 1931)
- Poema eroico (Notte nel campo di Oloferne), for orchestra (Teatro alla Scala, Milan, 6 June 1932)
- Salve, Regina!, motet for soprano solo, choir and orchestra (Milan, 1932)
- O sacrum convivium, motet for soprano, choir and orchestra (Milan, 1932)
- Missa Salisburgensis, for soprano, baritone, choir and large orchestra (Salzburg, 4 August 1933)
- Cantata biblica, three preludes and three parts for voice and piano (Salzburg, 1934)
- Dances and Greek rites, for violin, cello and piano (1939)
- Pavane for piano
- Preghiera, sacred piece for string instruments and organ
- Ave Maria, for three voices and organ
- Tempo di sinfonia in D flat

=== Songs wih piano ===
- Invocazione italica: coro di popolo, text by Giovanni Borelli (Milan, 1915)
- Preghiera del soldato, text by F. Pastonchi (Milan, 1917)
- Dormi, tesoro, own text (Milan, 1932)
- Die kleine Mutter, text by Manfred Hausmann (Milan, 1933)
- Sorride ella, from a text by Rabindranath Tagore (Rome, 1934)
- Non partire, from a text by Rabindranath Tagore (Rome, 1934)
- The Secret, from a text by Rabindranath Tagore (Rome, 1934)
- La lampada, text by Raniero Nicolai (1934)
- Tristezza d'una notte di primavera, text by Gabriele D'Annunzio
- Nozze rosee, text by Maria Rossi Borzotti
- Birdy song, text by J. Madden

== Recordings ==
- Cassandra – Denia Mazzola (Clitennestra), Alberto Cupido (Agamennone), Arnold Kocharyan (Egisto), Tea Demurishvili (Cassandra), Pierre Lebon (Oreste), Andzella Kirse (Una Coèfora), Jean Marc Ivaldi (Il Fazionario del Porto), Jean Marc Ivaldi (Il Navarca), Nikola Mijailovic (Il Prologo); conductor: Enrique Diemecke, Orchestre National de Montpellier Languedoc-Roussillon, Latvian Radio Chorus. Live recording 2000, Agorà Musica AG 260.2
