= Thunder Bay Symphony Orchestra =

Symphony orchestra in Thunder Bay, Ontario

- Orchestra
- Former name: Lakehead Symphony Orchestra
- Founded: 1960
- Location: Thunder Bay, Ontario
- Website: www.tbso.ca

The Thunder Bay Symphony Orchestra (TBSO) is a Canadian professional orchestra based in Thunder Bay, Ontario.

== History ==
Founded on 29 November 1960, the Lakehead Symphony Orchestra made its debut at the Lakeview High School auditorium. Its first conductor was Rene Charrier, who was on his way to Calgary with Doug Dahlgren when they wrecked their car and became stranded in Port Arthur. Saul Laskin, then mayor of Port Arthur, was impressed by their talent and convinced them to stay.

When Port Arthur and Fort William amalgamated in 1970, the orchestra changed its name to the Thunder Bay Symphony Orchestra. Boris Brott was the music director and conductor from 1967 to 1972. The Princeton String Quartet formed the core of the ensemble during the 1960s and early 1970s. The members of the quartet travelled from Minneapolis where many were members of the Minnesota Orchestra. Numerous musicians from the Minnesota Orchestra and Saint Paul Chamber Orchestra were hired to supplement the orchestra during that time. Dwight Bennett was engaged as Music Director from 1974 to 1989. (American child-prodigy conductor James Touchi-Peters served as associate music director under Bennett for one season, 1977–78.) The Thunder Bay Symphony Chorus was formed in 1974 to enable the performance of major choral works and the orchestra became one of the foremost community orchestras in Ontario. Until 1985, the TBSO performed in the Selkirk Auditorium of the former Selkirk High school (present day Saint Patrick High school), Lakehead Exhibition Centre, local schools, and churches. The orchestra moved its larger concerts to the new Thunder Bay Community Auditorium when it opened in 1985.

Glen Mossop took over as Music Director from 1989 to 1994, and Stephane Laforest from 1995 to 1999. During the 1995 season, the orchestra met with significant financial difficulties with the accumulated deficit rising to $140,000. By the summer of 1999, that deficit had increased to $450,000 due to a number of factors: a dispute over musician's pay led to a large retroactive tax bill and the orchestra lost its charitable lottery license. In July 1999, the TBSO laid off staff and filed for bankruptcy. Revenue Canada accepted its second proposed repayment plan, allowing it to continue to operations.

With the appointment of Geoffrey Moull as Music Director in 2000 the TBSO was able to proceed on more secure footing. In 2003 the Thunder Bay Regional Arts Council presented its Award to Education to Moull and the TBSO for innovative educational and outreach programs. By 2004, it offered 25 main concerts and the position of Conductor-in-Residence was added (Richard Lee 2003–2005, Jason Caslor 2005–2007, Stéphane Potvin 2008–2011, Daniel Bartholomew-Poyser 2011–2014, Simon Rivard 2014–2017, Maria Fuller 2017–2019). CBC Radio 2 recorded and annually broadcast the TBSO nationally starting in 2001. A self-produced CD recording titled Variations on a Memory became the best-selling album of the Canadian Music Centre in 2005. A second CD recording with blues artist Rita Chiarelli titled Uptown goes Downtown was nominated for two Canadian Folk Music Awards. Moull completed his tenure as Music Director of the TBSO in 2009.

American conductor Arthur Post was appointed as Music Director in 2010. Post brought a new vision and energy to programming and audience engagement. He led the commissioning of seven major works and recorded three CDs, including a 50th anniversary commemorative album designed to broaden the orchestra's presence in the community. His Analekta recording of the music of composer Jordan Pal, "Into the Wonder", with the Gryphon Trio playing with the TBSO was nominated for Canada's JUNO award for Best Classical Album of 2019, alongside entries from the Toronto, Detroit, Seattle and BBC symphonies. Innovative and diverse programming and collaborations with local musicians were hallmarks of his tenure.

In 2017, Paul Haas was named music director. Haas, who has previously served as the head of the New York Youth Symphony and is music director of the Symphony of Northwest Arkansas, officially took over July 1 of that year. Haas extended the range and diversity of programming to include a focus on the orchestra's isolated Canadian location and its unique cultural dynamics. An annual Indigenous concert, Noondaagotoon ("Play it!" in Ojibwa) has been added to the regular season, as have Nordic, Outsider's, Women's and Earth Day concerts.

The TBSO presents two Mainstage series at the Thunder Bay Community Auditorium: Masters and Pops, and three Second Stage series in smaller venues: House, Family and Northern Lights, performing 23 regular season concerts, and over 50 concerts in total annually. The orchestra annually reaches some 29,000 concert-goers including 10,000 students and tour audiences across Northwestern Ontario, which depending on the season, include Kenora, Dryden, Fort Frances, Red Lake, Nipigon, Terrace Bay, Marathon, Manitouwadge, Wawa, Geraldton, Hearst, Timmins and Sioux Lookout.

The TBSO now employs 31 full-time musicians over a 29-week concert season and additionally hires up to 30 per-service musicians for many concerts. An administrative office staff of two full-time, four part-time people, and six part-time musician-staff people, supports the musical activities of the organization. As of 2020, its annual budget is just over $2 million, making the TBSO an important contributor to Thunder Bay's arts economy. Over the past few seasons, the orchestra has benefitted from careful management and donor largesse. Its current (2020) operating deficit is lower than it has been in over 25 years.

The TBSO is a member of Orchestras Canada. The TBSO is the only fully professional symphony orchestra between Toronto and Winnipeg, and Thunder Bay is the smallest city in Canada to have a fully professional classical orchestra.

== Nominations ==
In 2019, the TBSO received a Juno nomination for its album Into the Wonder, a collection of compositions by Toronto-based Canadian composer, Jordan Pal.

== Music Directors ==
- Rene Charrier (1960)
- C.H. Bateman (1964)
- Boris Brott (1967)
- Manuel Suarez (1972)
- Dwight Bennett (1974)
- Glenn Mossop (1989)
- Stéphane Laforest (1995)
- David Bowser (1999)
- Geoffrey Moull (2000)
- Arthur Post (2010)
- Paul Haas (2017)
- Evan Mitchell (Interim) (2023)

== Directors ==
- Andrea Sears, President
- Robert Perrier, Vice President
- Nancy Campbell, Secretary
- Ted Davis, Treasurer
- Shy-Anne Hovorka, Director
- Carol Pollard, Director
- Ryleigh Dupuis, Executive Director/General Manager (staff)
