= Raniero Nicolai =

Italian poet

Olympic medal record

Art competitions
Gold medal – first place	1920 Antwerp	Literature

Raniero Nicolai (October 5, 1893 – April 2, 1958) was an Italian poet. He won a gold medal in the art competitions at the 1920 Olympic Games for his "Canzoni Olimpioniche" ("Olympic Songs").
