= Katja Czellnik =

German woman opera director

Katja Czellnik (born 6 August 1966) is a German music theatre director and lecturer at the Universität der Künste Berlin.

== Life ==
Born in Hamburg, Czellnik studied musical theatre directing at the Hochschule für Musik und Theater Hamburg under the conduct of Götz Friedrich from 1986 to 1990. She completed her studies with Wolfgang Rihm's Jakob Lenz at the Opera Stabile of the Hamburg State Opera. Parallel to her studies in directing, she also studied acting.

In 1990, Czellnik became assistant director and evening director for musical theatre at the Staatstheater Braunschweig. So far, she has directed productions at the following theatres: Staatstheater Braunschweig, Oldenburgisches Staatstheater, Theater Bielefeld, Theater Dortmund, Staatsoper Hannover, Staatstheater Nürnberg, Theater Basel, Vienna Volksoper, and Staatstheater Darmstadt.

During the directorship of Kirsten Harms at the Kiel Opera, Czellnik was part of the regular cast of directors. With her six works shown here, she attracted considerable national interest: Der Rattenfänger (Wilfried Hiller), Cristoforo Colombo (Alberto Franchetti), Edipo Re and Pagliacci (Ruggero Leoncavallo), I capricci di Callot (Gian Francesco Malipiero), María de Buenos Aires (Astor Piazzolla) and Eduard auf dem Seil (Wilfried Hiller). These productions contributed significantly to the character of the Kiel Opera until 2003.

At the Bregenz Festival, Czellnik staged Bohuslav Martinů's Giulietta; she is now a member of the directing staff at the Komische Oper Berlin, where her interpretations of Peter Grimes, María de Buenos Aires and Paul Dessau's Die Verurteilung des Lukullus have been seen to date.

Czellnik is a lecturer at the Berlin University of the Arts, teaching Analysis of Contemporary Drama Texts / Stage Design Concepts. She regularly supervises scenic works in changing collaborations with the Berlin University of the Arts, the Ernst Busch School, the Hans Eissler School and the Hamburg Institute for Direction.

Since 2009, she has also been working in the field of video performance.

== Publications ==
- Maria de Buenos Aires : (program leaflet)
- Eugen Onegin : (program leaflet)
- La Traviata : (program leaflet)
- Jenufa : (program leaflet)
- Woher Wohin : (program leaflet)

== Honours ==
- 1997: Dr. Otto Kasten Stiftung
