= Szenen aus dem Leben der Heiligen Johanna =

- Opera by Walter Braunfels
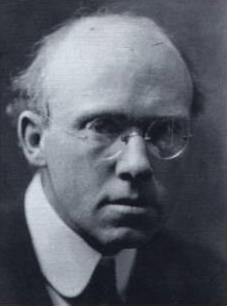
- Walter Braunfels in 1920
- Librettist: Braunfels
- Language: German

Szenen aus dem Leben der Heiligen Johanna (Jeanne D'Arc) is an opera in three acts by Walter Braunfels to a libretto by the composer.

== Composition history ==
Braunfels began the composition after attending the premiere of Hindemith's Mathis der Maler in May 1938, and he had completed the opera by 1943. The libretto, written by the composer, is based on the actual French and Latin documents of the trial of Joan of Arc in their German translation (1935), there are also a few references to the play Saint Joan by George Bernard Shaw and other 20th-century interpretations of Joan of Arc. The libretto produces many of Joan's naive statements verbatim from the trial documents.

== Performance history ==
Despite Braunfels' intense affection for the opera, as an expression of his Roman Catholic belief, he was unable to obtain a performance after the war. His student Fritzjof Haas recorded that Braunfels, six months before his death in 1953, expressed as his biggest disappointment of all his unheard compositions that he had never heard Szenen aus dem Leben der Heiligen Johanna performed. Following the reawakening in interest in Braunfels' work after Decca's recording of The Birds in 1996, the opera was finally first performed in Stockholm under the baton of Manfred Honeck in 2001. The performance was recorded by Sveriges Radio and in 2010 licensed to Decca and released on CD.

== Roles ==
Role	Voice type	Premiere Cast 2001 (Conductor: Manfred Honeck)
Joan of Arc	soprano	Juliane Banse
Gilles de Rais	baritone	Terje Stensvold
Georges de la Trémoille	baritone	Günter Missenhardt
Charles VII of France	tenor	Gunnar Guðbjörnsson
Archangel Michael	tenor	Robert Künzli

== Recordings ==
- Swedish Radio, 2001 licensed to Decca Classics 2010.
