= Guillaume Cop =

- Born: Around 1460s Basel (Episcopal Principality of Basel)
- Died: 2 December 1532; Paris
- Education: University of Basel Faculty of Medicine of Paris
- Title: Doctor

Guillaume Cop (in German Wilhelm Kopp, in Latin Gulielmus Copus), born in Basel in the 1460s, died in Paris on 2 December 1532, was a Renaissance physician and humanist.

== Biography ==
He matriculated as a student of the University of Basel in the winter of 1478/79. His tutor was Johannes Heberling of Schwäbisch Gmünd, an enthusiastic listener of Johannes Reuchlin (who taught in Basel in 1477). In his native town he received his license, master of arts, and devoted himself for three years to the study of medicine. After no doubt staying in other cities, he reached Paris around 1488 and enrolled in the faculty of medicine. He received a bachelor's degree in medicine on 19 March 1492, dismissed on 13 April 1496 (first on the candidate presentation list), then doctor on the following 17 May. At that date he was already married to Étiennette Turgis, with whom he had four sons (Nicolas Cop, born around 1501, was the third).

He began learning Greek with Janus Lascaris (who arrived in France in 1494). Around 1497, he met Erasmus, then in Paris : that year and three years later, he treated him for bouts of fever.

The two men became friends, and when Erasmus really became fluent in Greek from 1500 onwards, he enjoyed it. He also attended the classes of Jérôme Aléandre, who came to teach in Paris in 1508 and dedicated his edition of De divinatione of Cicero in 1510 . He was also a close friend of Jacques Lefèvre d'Étaples (whose insomnia problems he treated in 1505) and of Guillaume Budé (with whom he campaigned for the foundation in Paris of a college for the teaching of ancient languages). In 1512 he was appointed personal physician to King Louis XII. He followed him in his war in Flanders and was present at the Battle of Guinegatte on 16 August 1513. In 1514, he took up the defense of Johannes Reuchlin, whom the faculty of theology in Paris had condemned. He was also the first physician to King Francis I, at the latest in 1523 and until his death . He was commissioned in 1517, with Guillaume Budé, to transmit to Erasmus the king's proposals intended to attract him to Paris, and it was to him that Erasmus addressed the letter by which he dodged the invitation.

== Written works ==
Guillaume Cop composed a Tractatus astrologicus ex variis antiquis desumptus. Otherwise, he translated from Greek into Latin, and edited, ancient medical works:

- The healthful precepts of Paul Aegineta, Paris, Henri Asbury, 1510, and Strasbourg, Mathias Schurer, 1511
- Hippocrates Coi's Presagiorum and the same on rationing of diet in acute diseases, Paris, 1511, and Henri Estienne, 1512.
- Galen's knowledge of the affective places in six books, Paris, Henri Estienne, 1513.
- Galen, On the causes and differences of diseases and symptoms, Paris, Josse Bade, 1523.
- Paul Æginetae, Strasbourg, Georges Ulricher, 1531.

== Bibliography ==
- Ernest Wickersheimer, Biographical Dictionary of Doctors in France in the Middle Ages, Paris, E. Droz, 1936 (then 1979), t. I, p. 235–238.
- Peter Gerard Bietenholz, article « Guillaume Cop », Contemporaries of Erasmus : A Biographical Register of the Renaissance and Reformation, University of Toronto Press, 1986, p. 336-337.
