= Lorenz Fries =

German Physician

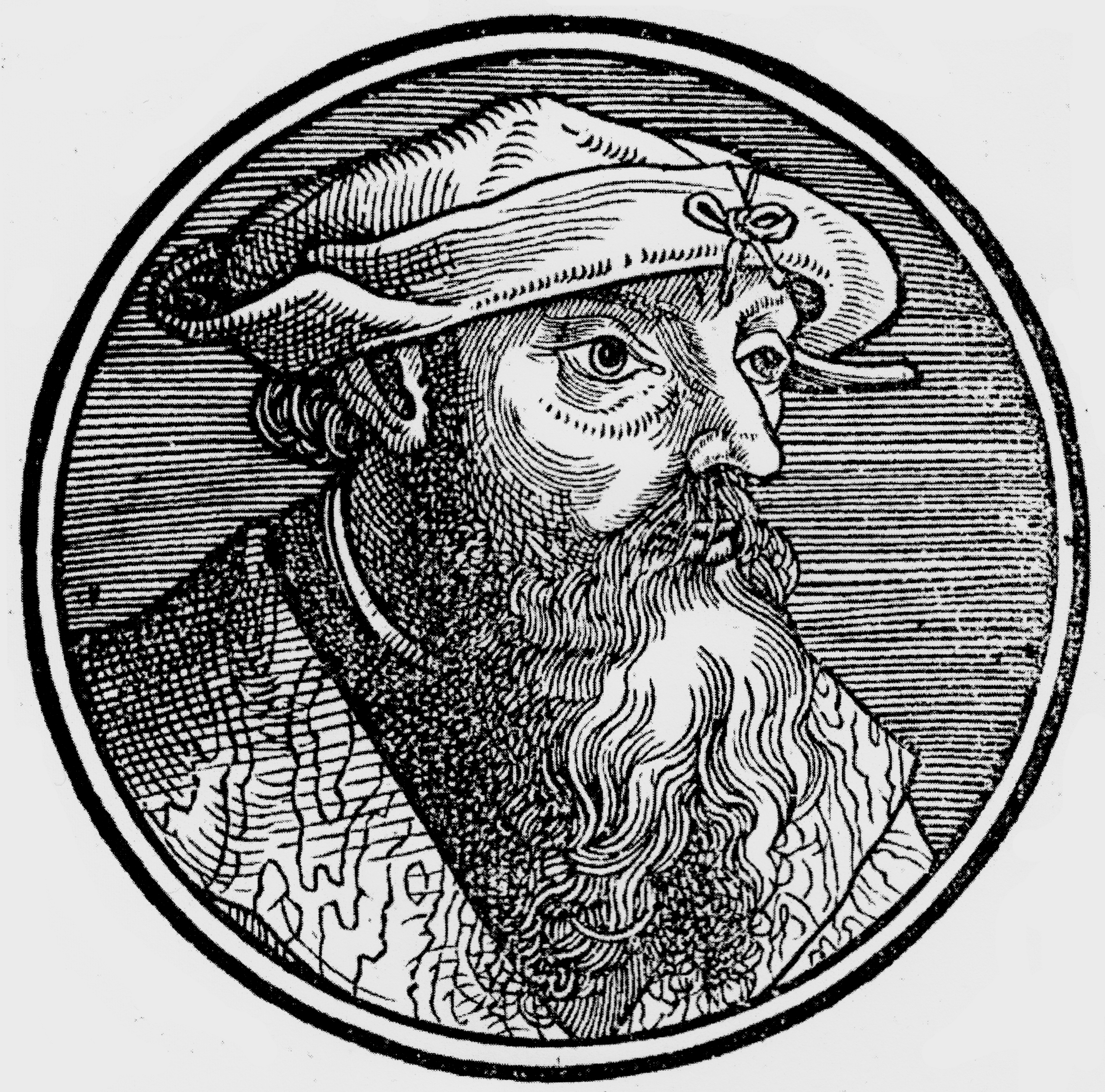
Lorenz Fries. 1523.

Lorenz Fries, also called Lorenz Phryes, Latinized Laurentius Frisius or Phrisius (born c. 1490; died 1531/32 in Metz) was a German physician, astrologer and cartographer, who worked mainly in Alsace. His most famous work is the “Spiegel der Arznei” (Mirror of Medicine) (twelve editions 1518–1557), one of the earliest works on medicine in the German language. His cartographic work continued that of Martin Waldseemüller in assimilating recent discoveries in the New World and Asia into the classical Ptolemaic framework.

== Life and work ==
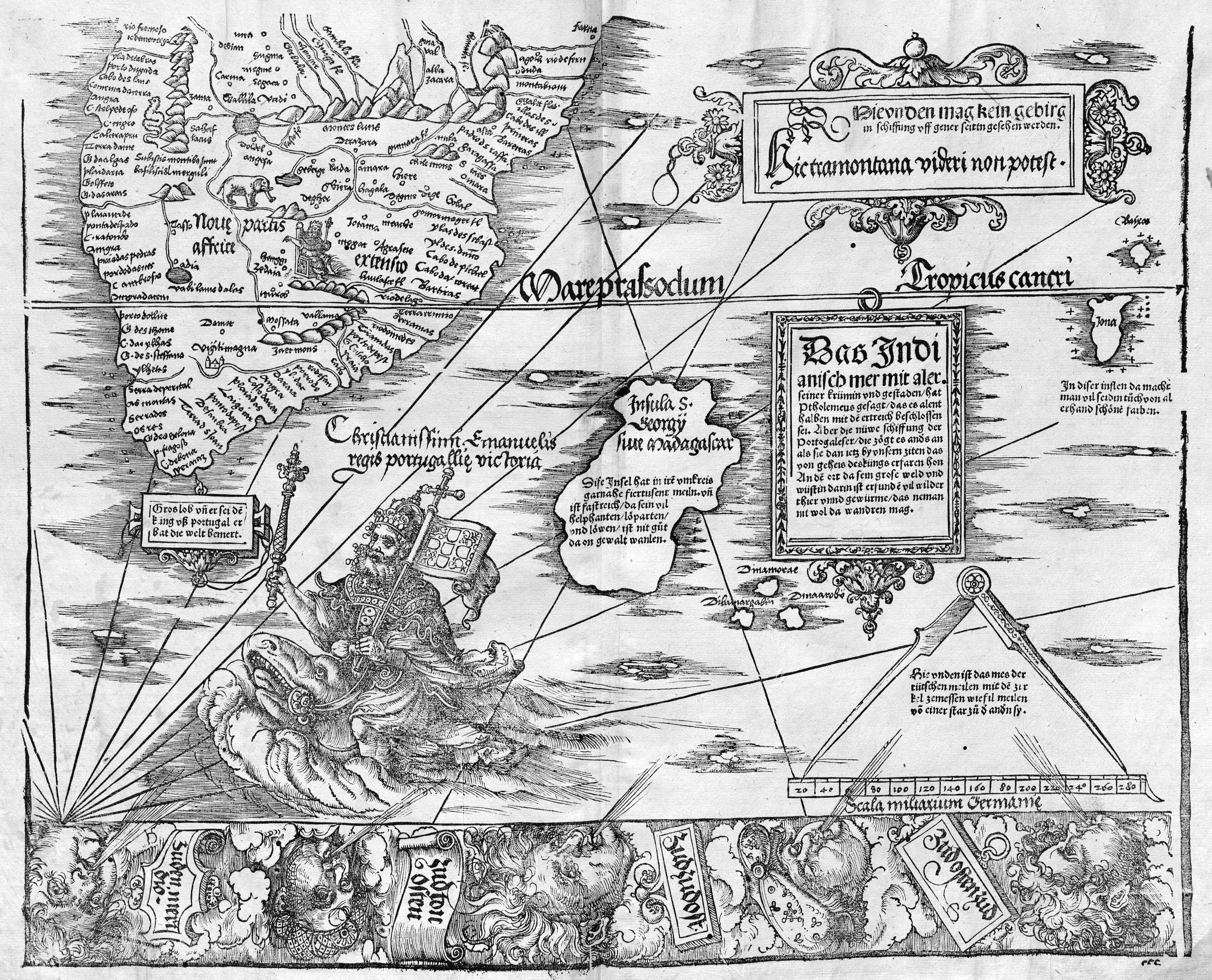
Carta Marina Navigatoria 1530. Indian Ocean

The date and place of birth of Lorenz Fries cannot be determined with certainty. Possible birth dates discussed include: “around 1485”, 10 August 1489 or “after 1490” Possible places of birth were given as: Mulhouse or Colmar, Metz, Swabia (Markgröningen). Sudhoff (1904) and Öhlschlägel (1985) have suggested that Fries studied in Padua, Piacenza, Montpellier and Vienna, where he probably completed his studies. There is no direct evidence for this.

Fries’ name first appeared in 1513 on a Nuremberg broadsheet describing a monstrous birth near Rome. At the end of 1518 he lived in the Augustinian monastery in Colmar. He practiced medicine in Colmar until about 1519-1519. On the title page of the first edition of the “Spiegel der Arznei” in 1518 he called himself “from Colmar / Doctor of Philopsophy and Medicine”. He dedicated this work to Johann Dingler, the Schlettstadt (Sélestat) guild master of the fishermen.

In March 1519, Fries moved to Strasbourg. In July of the same year, he accepted a call to Freiburg im Üechtland, where he held the office of city physician for 8 months and where he met Agrippa von Nettesheim. In the middle of 1520, he returned to Strasbourg and married Barbara Thun, the daughter of the deceased Strasbourg master glazier Ambrosius Thun. Fries thus became a citizen of Strasbourg. He also became a member of the guild "Zur Steltz" (goldsmiths and printers). While in Strasbourg, he re-worked a number of the maps of Martin Waldseemüller, and prepared a revised edition of Ptolemy's Geography. In May 1525, Fries gave up his Strasbourg citizenship and left the city, moving to Metz. This was probably because Strasbourg was increasingly a Protestant city, and Fries remained an adherent of the Roman Church.

Until the winter of 1528, he stayed in Trier, where he worked as a doctor. On February 28, 1528, Paracelsus, who had fled from Basel, wrote to Bonifacius Amerbach: "Phrusius de Colmaria optime valet, sumque optimus familiae et totam civitatem". ("Fries von Colmar is in the best of health, and I have been well received by his family and the whole city.") In July 1528, Fries wrote a "Prognostication" for the year 1529 in Diedenhofen (Thionville). In Metz he created a French-language "Prognostication" for the year 1529 in October 1528 and on November 14, 1528, a birth horoscope for his friend Nicolas de Heu (1494–1547), the mayor of Metz. In the 1532 edition of "Spiegel der Arznei" printed by Balthasar Beck in Strasbourg, a foreword by Lorenz Fries was printed, which he had written on July 23, 1530, in Metz. In it he noted in passing: "... Let me, God, live for a short time ..." Another foreword in the same edition was written on May 14, 1532, by Otto Brunfels. It said: “... therefore the author of this book, the highly renowned doctor Laurentius Fries, was commissioned to correct this before his death...” From these statements it was concluded that Fries died between July 1530 and May 1532.

There was a "long-standing friendship" between Fries and the Strasbourg printer and publisher Johannes Grüninger, who published the majority of his works.

== Writings ==
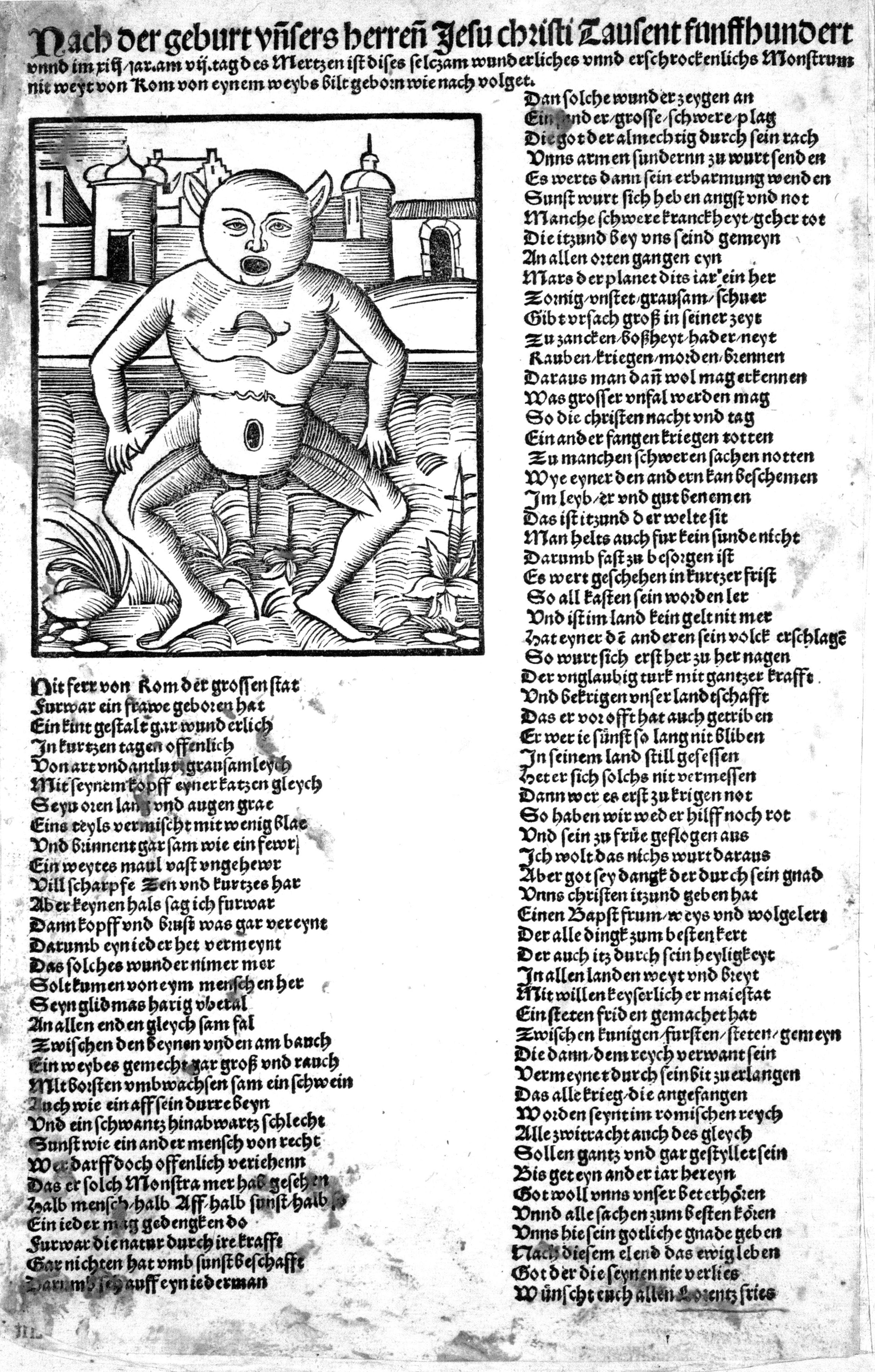
Single-sheet print. Nuremberg 1513

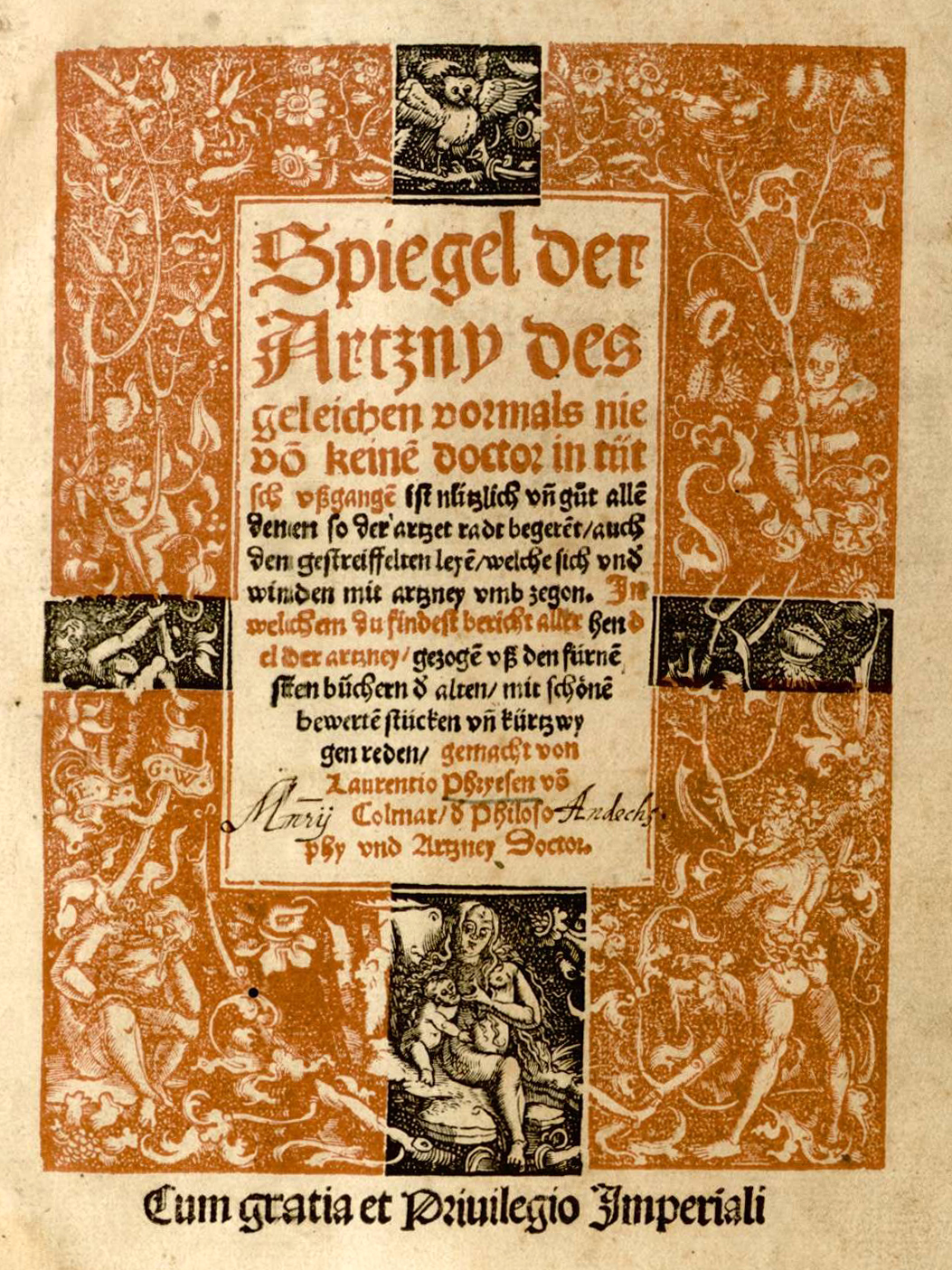
Spiegel der Arznei. Edition 1518 Grüninger

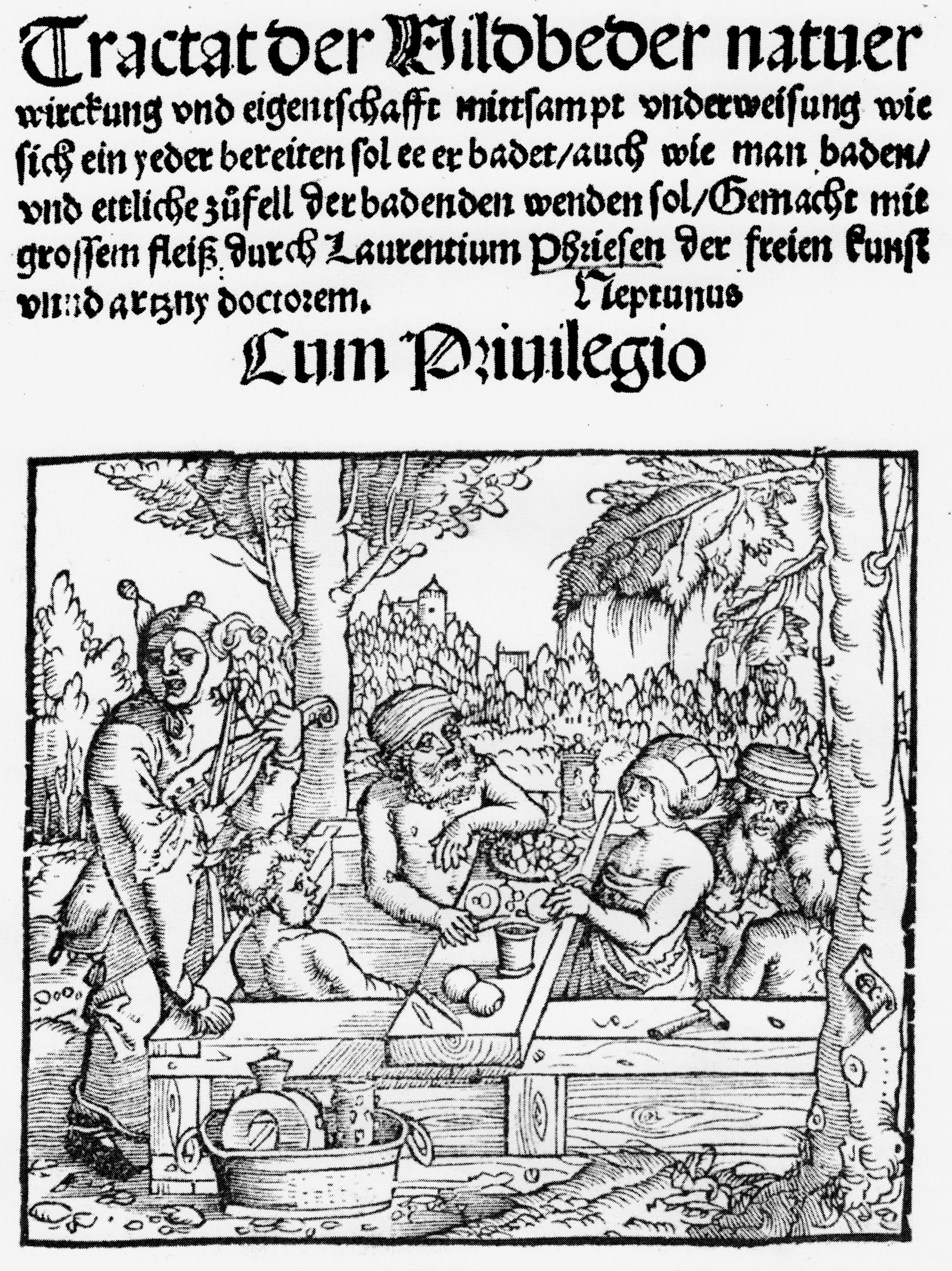
Traktat der Wildbäder Natur. 1519

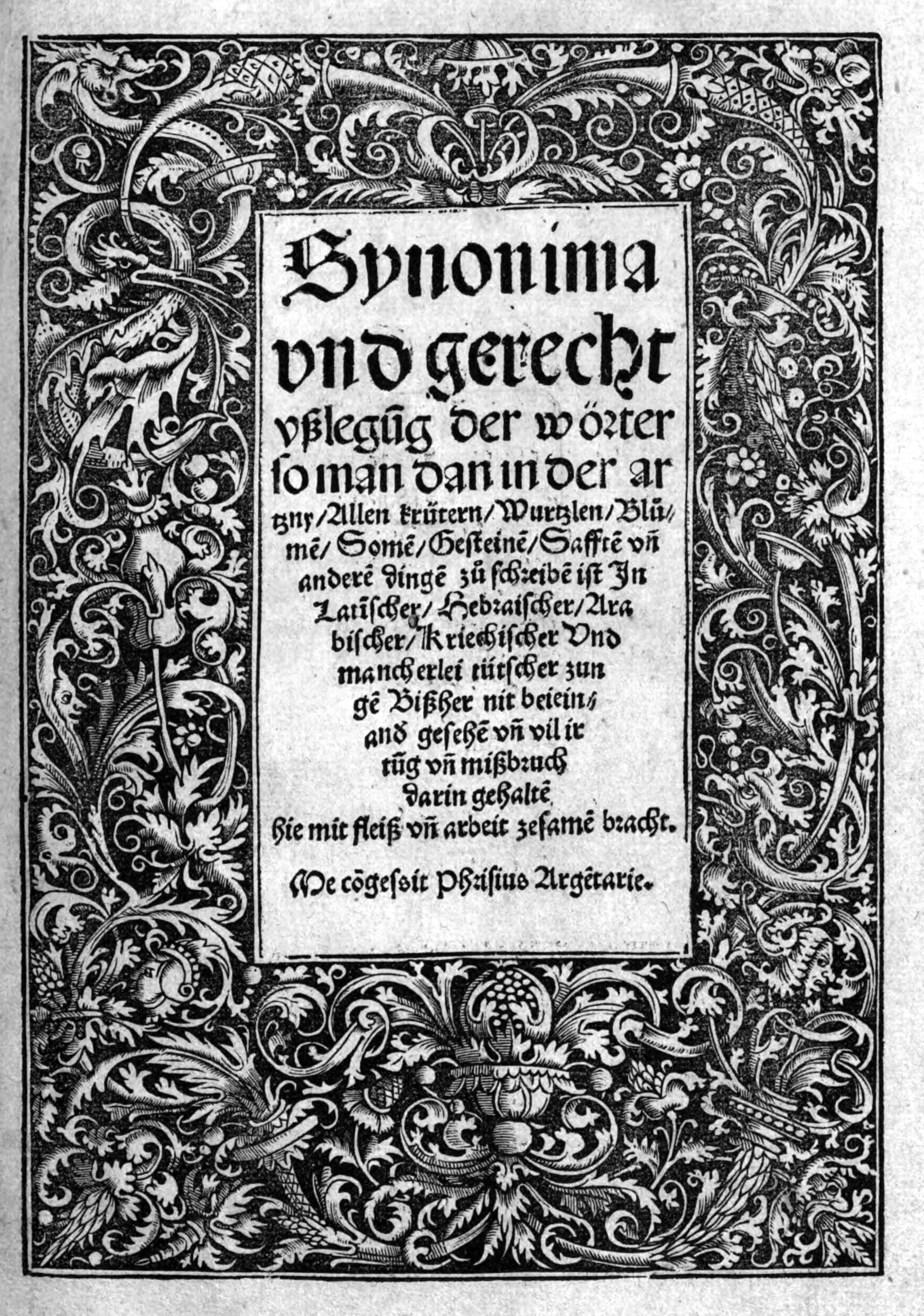
Synonymenregister. 1519

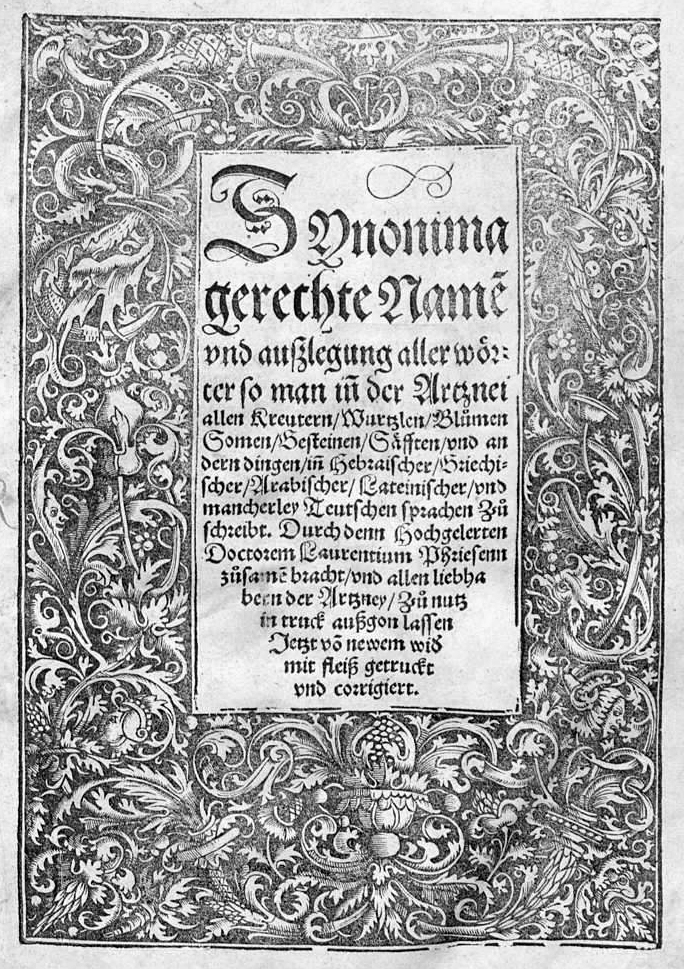
Synonymenregister. 1535

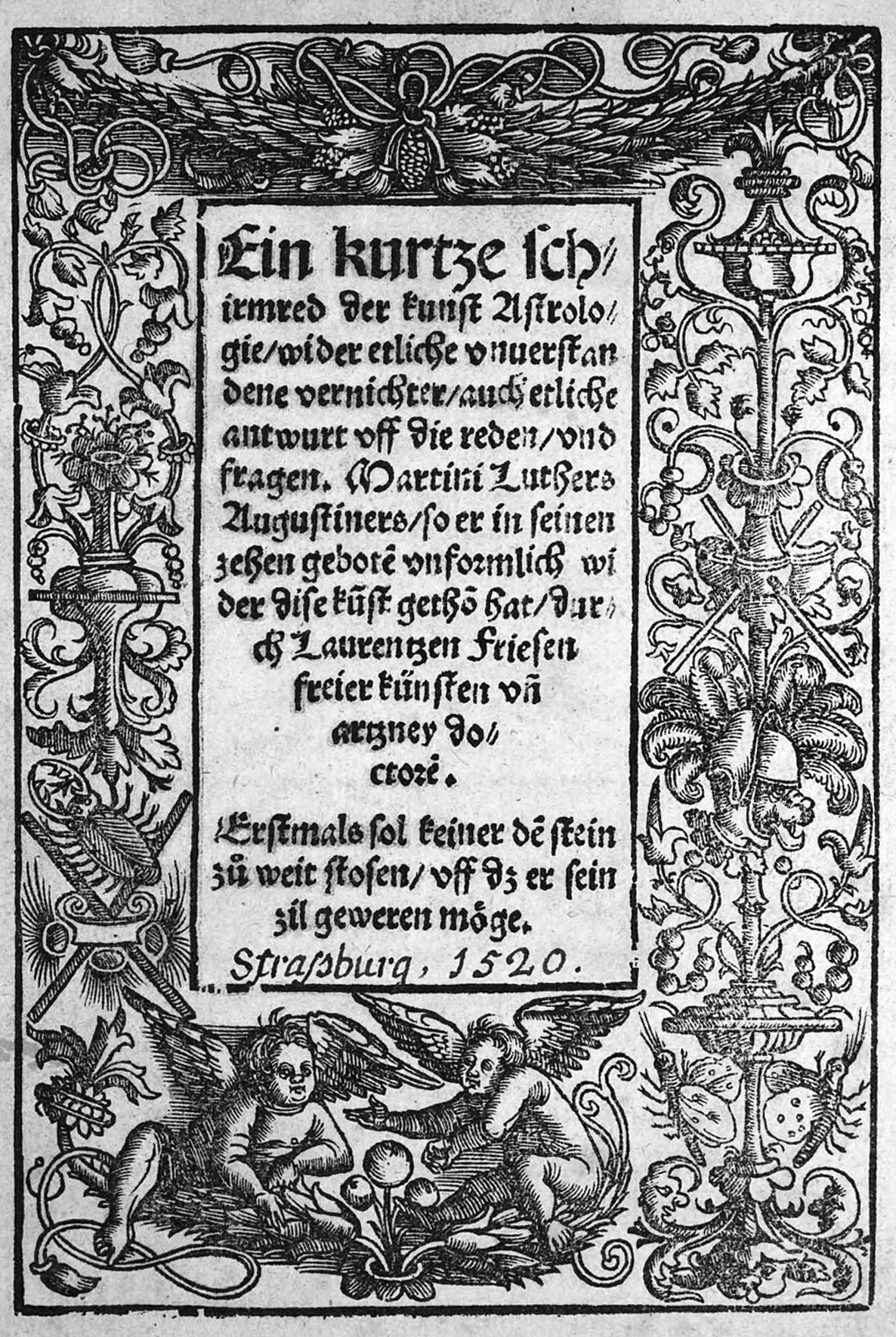
Schirmred der Kunst Astrologie. 1520

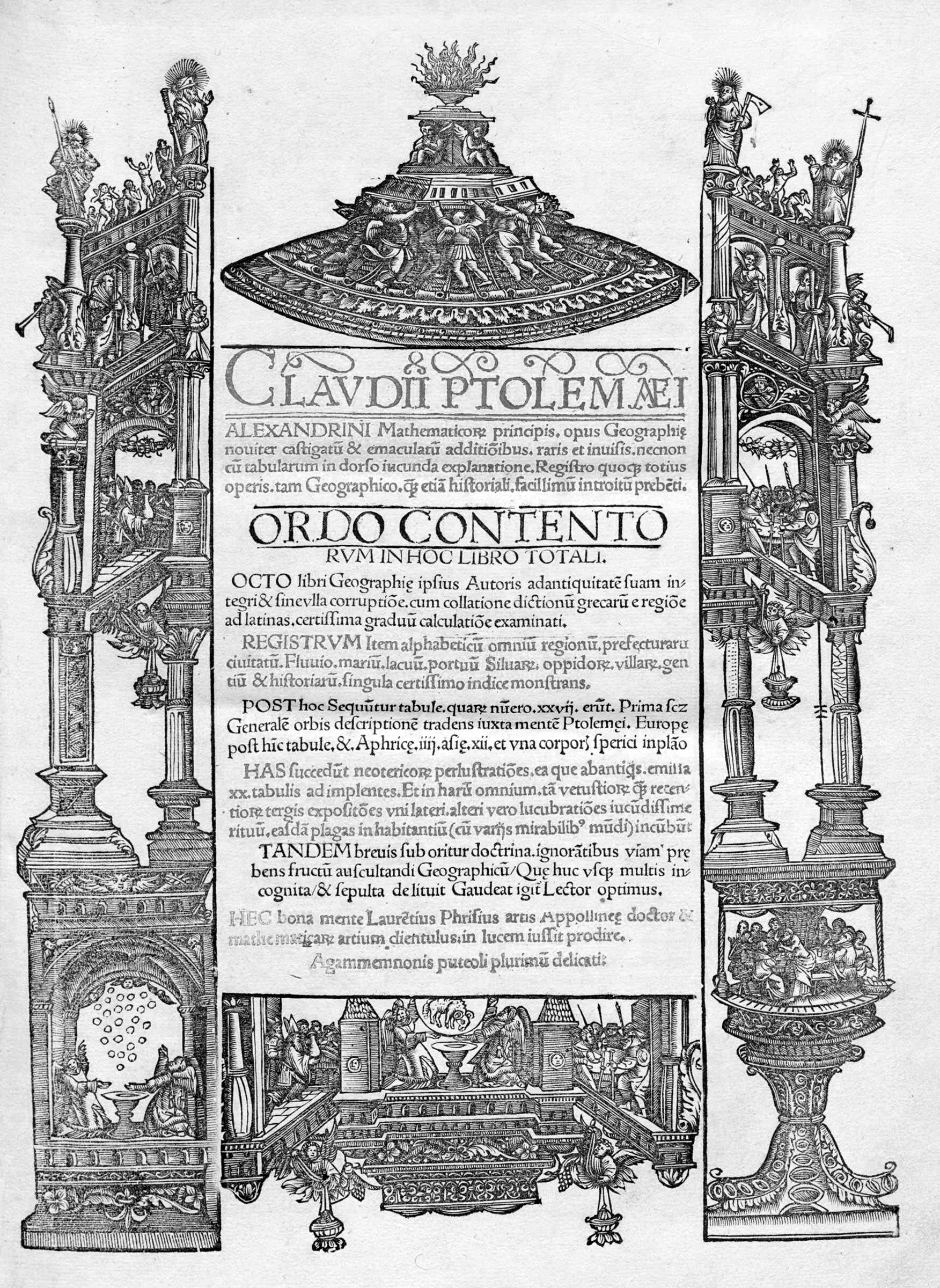
Claudii Ptolemei opus Geographie. 1522

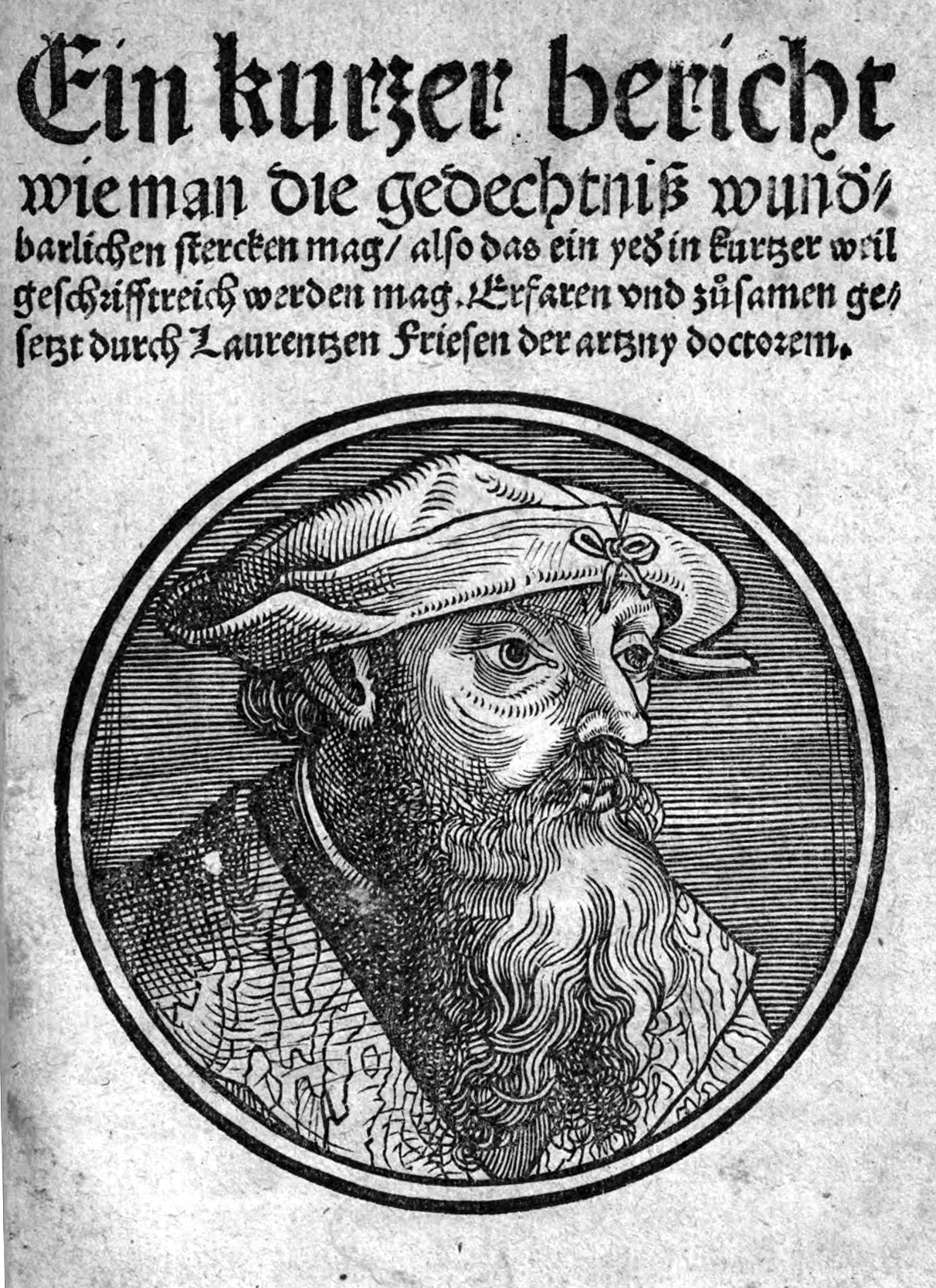
Ars memorativa. 1523

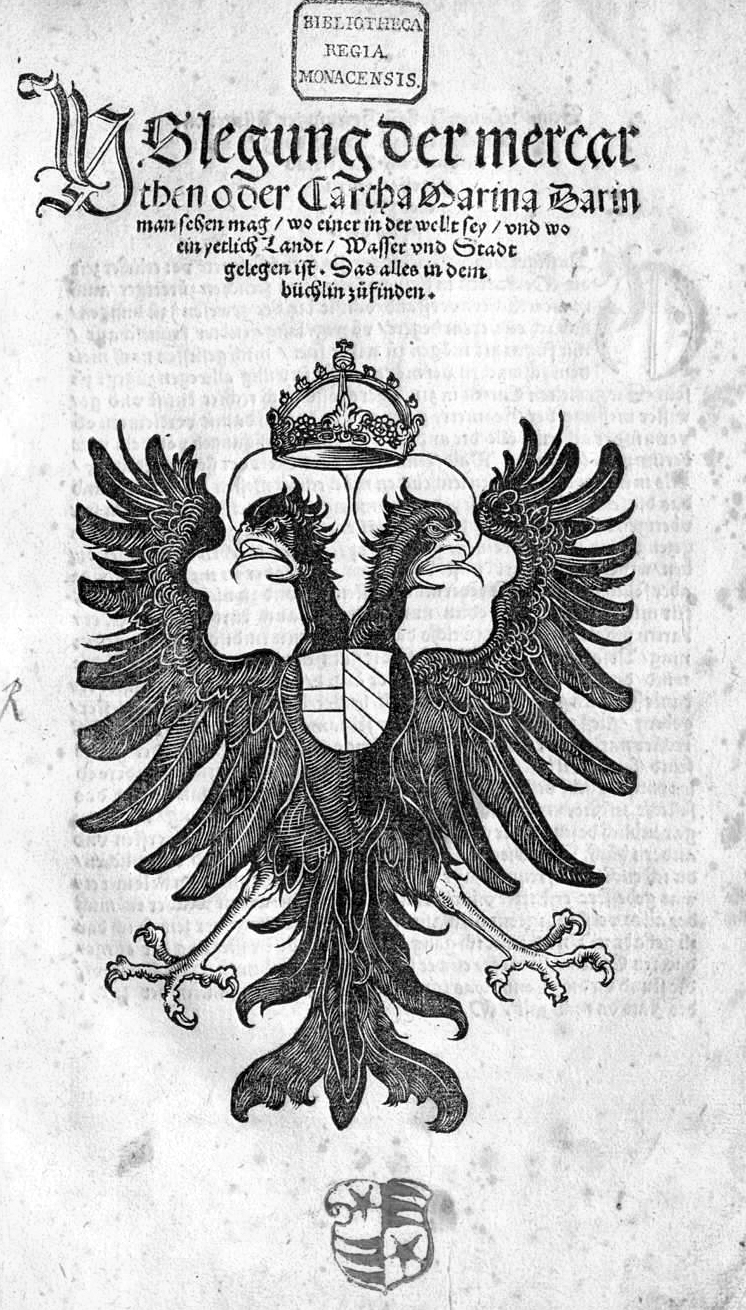
Uslegung der mercarthen oder Cartha Marina. 1527

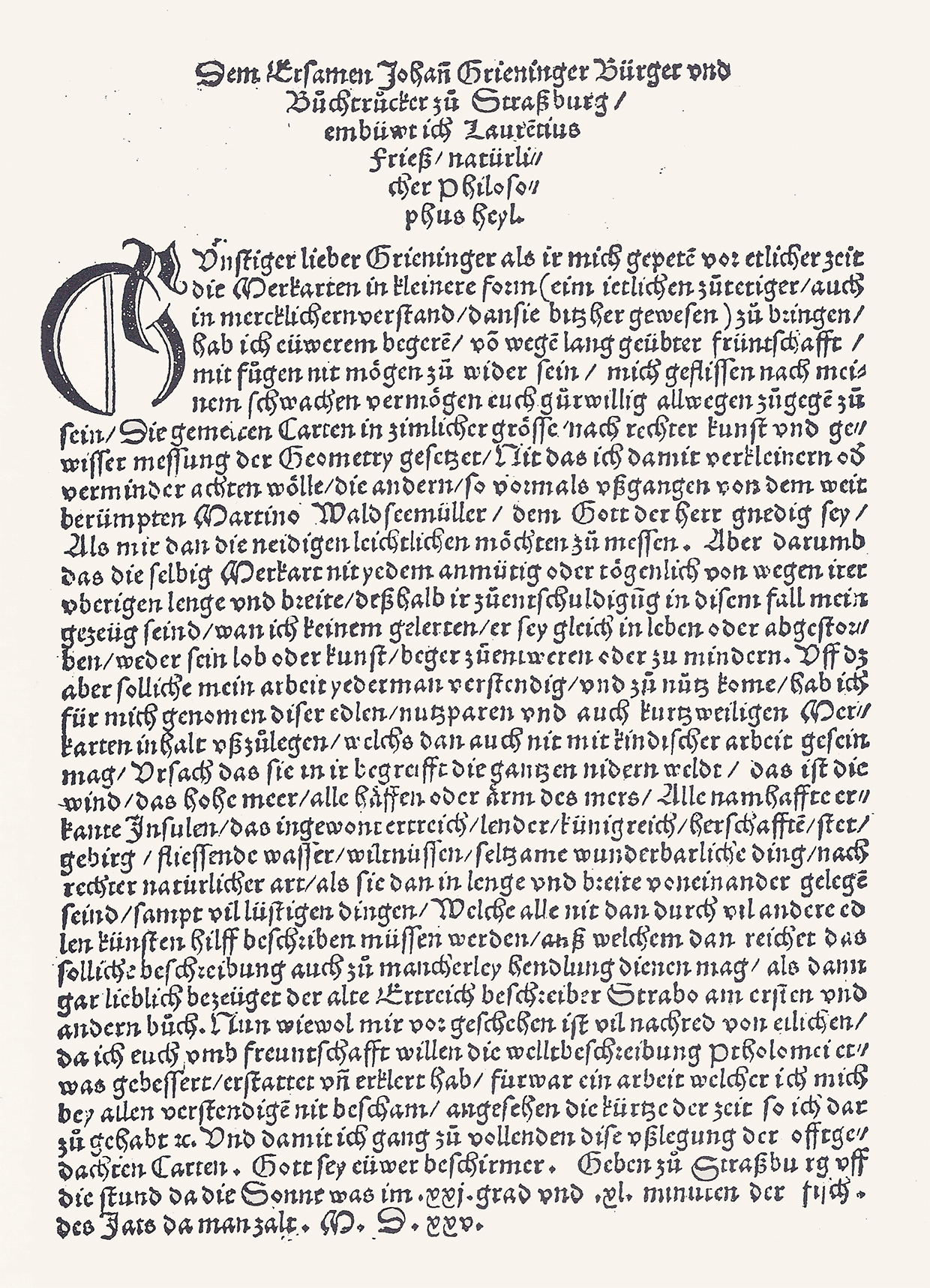
Preface from 1525 in Uslegung der mercarthen oder Cartha Marina. 1527

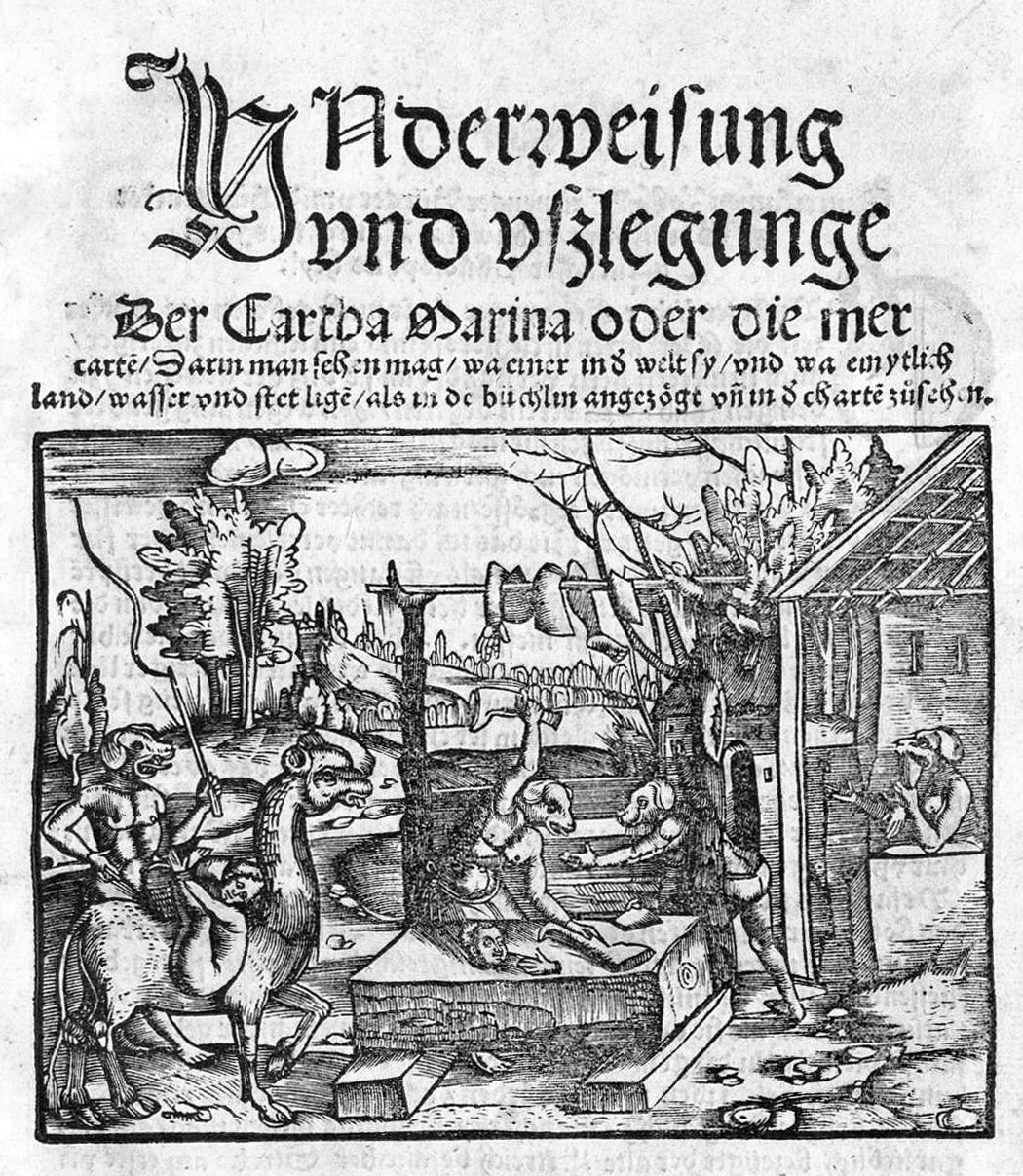
Underweisung und ußlegunge der Cartha Marina oder die mercarten. 1530

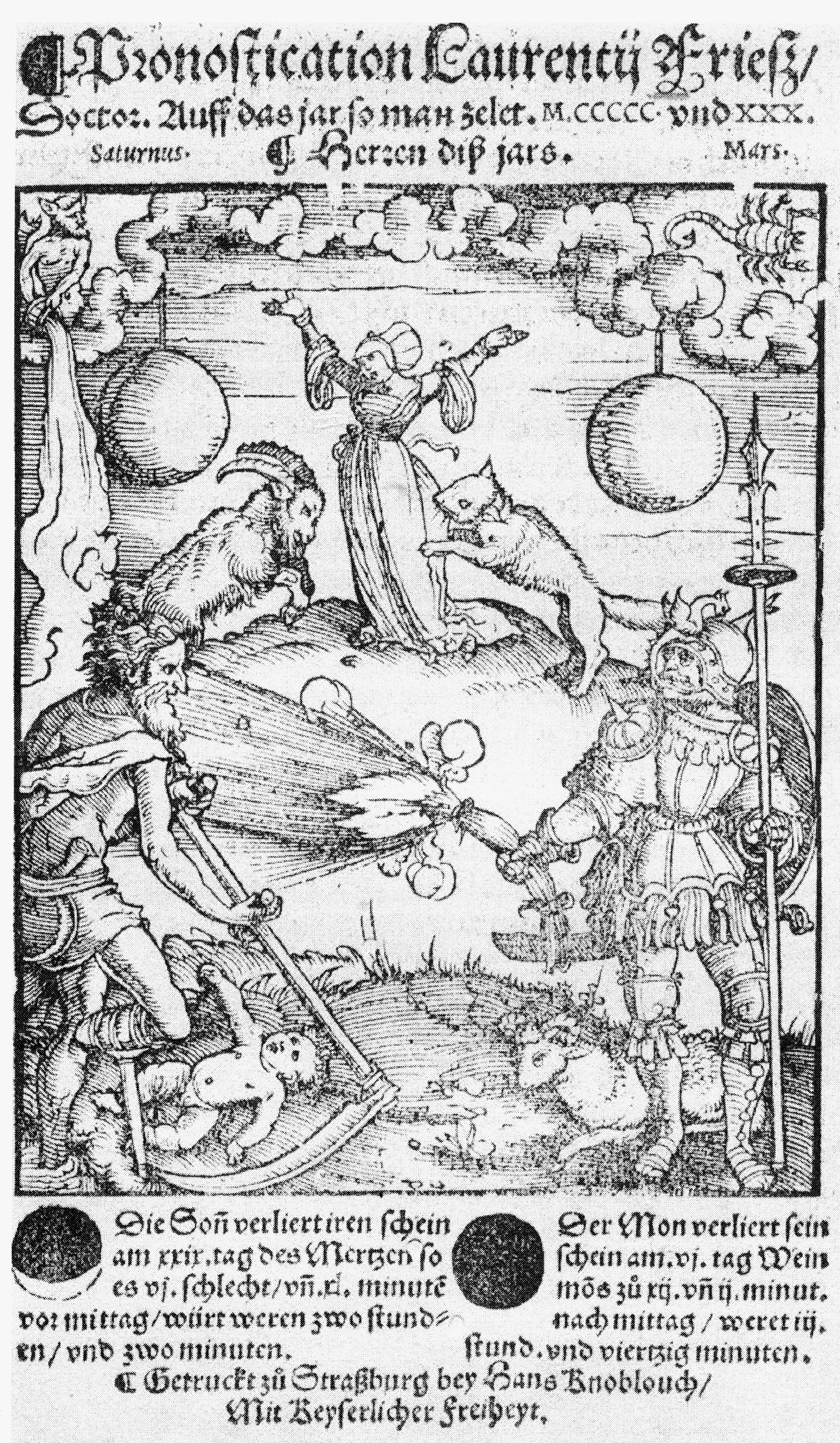
Prognostication auf das Jahr 1530.

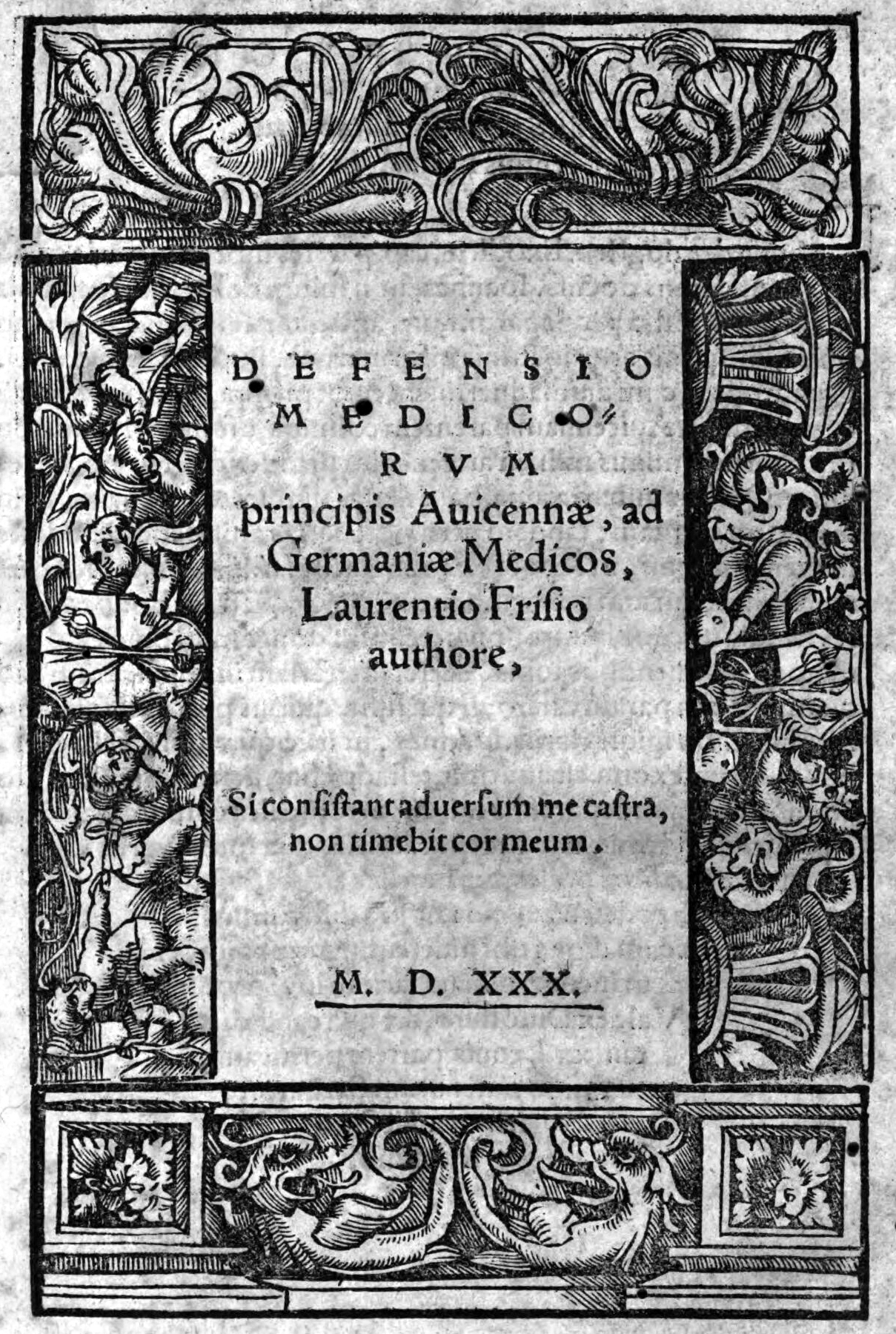
Defensio medicorum principis Avicennae. 1530

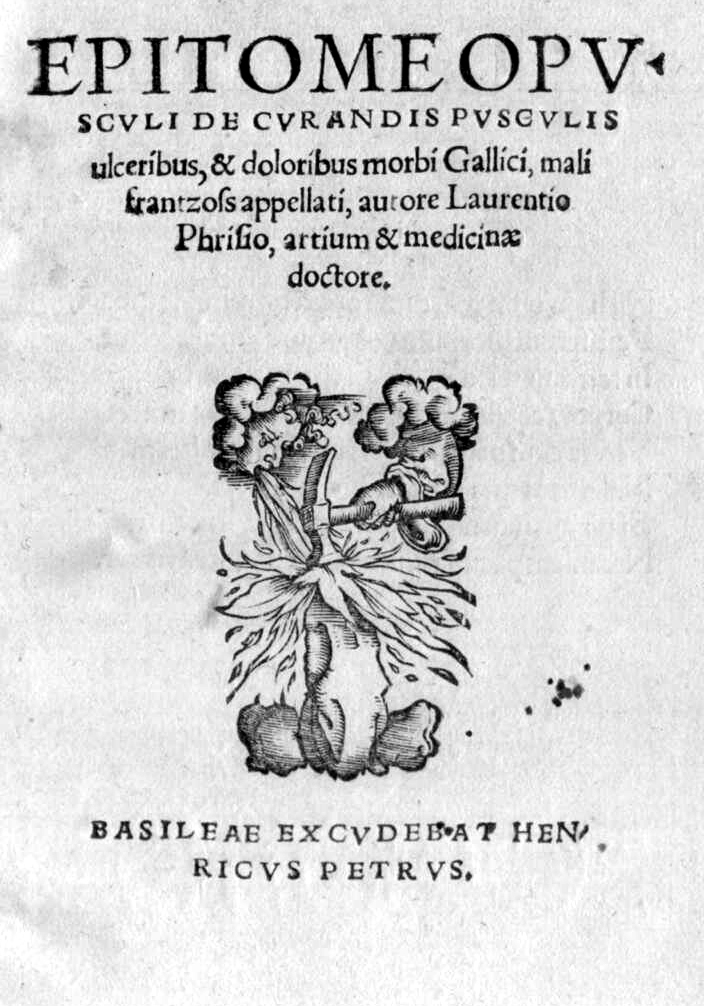
Epitome opusculi de curandis pusculis. 1532
- Wundergeburt zu Rom vom 7. March 1513. (Miraculous Birth in Rome on March 7, 1513). Einblattdruck (single sheet print). Johann Weissenburger, Nürnberg 1513
- Spiegel der Artzny […] (Mirror of Medicine). Printed in twelve editions by various publishers from 1518 to 1557 and edited from 1529 by the humanist Otto Brunfels.
- Traktat der Wildbäder Natur. Joh. Grüninger, Strasbourg 24. July 1519; Bartholomäus Grüninger, Strasbourg 1538.
- Synonyma und gerecht ußlegung der wörter so man in der artzny, allen Krütern, Wurtzlen, Bluomen, Somen, Gesteinen, Safften und anderen Dingen zuo schreiben ist […]. Joh. Grüninger, Strasbourg 29. November 1519; Barth. Grüninger, Strasbourg 1535. synonym index of simple medicines in Latin, Hebrew, Greek, Arabic and German based on the Mainz Gart der Gesundheit from 1485 and the Kleines Destillierbuch.
- Kurze Schirmred der Kunst der Astrologiae (Brief defence of the art of astrology). Joh. Grüninger, Strasbourg 28. November 1520
- Claudii Ptolemaei / Alexandrini Mathematicor. principis. Opus Geographie. Joh. Grüninger, Strasbourg 12. March 1522, 30. März 1525.
- Auslegung und Gebrauch des Astrolabs (Interpretation and Use of the Astrolabe). Joh. Grüninger, Strasbourg 23. June 1522. – Expositio et usus astrolabii. Joh. Grüninger, Strasbourg 7. September 1522.
- Prognostikationen: 1523, 1524, 1525 (Judenpractica), 1526, 1529, 1530, 1531
- Ars memorativa. Joh. Grüninger, Strasbourg 7. März 1523. – Ein kurzzer Bericht wie man die Gedechtnisz […] stercken mag. Joh. Grüninger, Strasbourg 12. März 1523.
- Wie man alte Schäden mit dem Holz Guaiaco heilen soll. Joh. Grüninger, Strasbourg 7. January 1525; Johann Prüss, Strasbourg 1530 und 1539.
  - Niederländische Übersetzung: Een grondelike bestendighe heylsame cure der grousamigher Pocken. Symon Cock, Antwerpen 1548 und Peter Warnerson, Kampen 1566.

The 1525 and 1530 editions are anonymous. Only the 1539 edition names Fries as the author. Karl Sudhoff (1904, p. 771) assumed that Fries wrote all these syphilis writings – the physician, librarian and medical historian Ernest Wickersheimer (1880–1965) doubted Fries' authorship of all editions.

- Auslegung der Meerkarten (von Martin Waldseemüller). Joh. Grüninger, Strasbourg 2. März 1525, 3. Juni 1527, Carta Marina Navigatoria 22. April 1530. Around 1525, Fries was probably the first to coin the German term “Karte”.
- Carta Marina Navigatoria Portugalien Navigationes : atque tocius cogniti orbis terrae marisque formae naturam situm et terminos noviter recognitos et ab antiquorum traditione differentes hec generaliter monstrat, 1525 Joh. Grüninger, Strasbourg 1530 (digitized copy)
- Zusammen mit Johannes Nidepontanus (Metz): Sudor anglicus. Joh. Knobloch d. J., Strasbourg 1529. Fries reported, among other things, about an epidemic in Freiburg im Üechtland in 1519, which he interpreted as an outbreak of the Sudor anglicus.
- Defensio medicorum Principis Avicennae ad Germaniae medicos. Johann Knobloch. d. J., Strasbourg 24. August 1530
- Epitome opusculi de curandis pusculis. Henricus Petrus, Basel 1532
  - Liber De Morbo Gallico : In Qvo Diuersi celeberrimi in tali materia scribentes, medicine contine[n]tur auctores videlicet. Nicolavs Leonicenus Vicentinus. Vlrichvs De Hvtten Germanus. Petrvs Andreas Mattheolo Senensis. Lavrentivs Phrisius. Ioannis Almenar Hispanus... Cremer, Venedig 1535 (digitized copy)

== Spiegel der Arznei ==
Fries' main work, the Mirror of Medicine, was printed in twelve editions by three publishers from 1518 to 1557 and edited from 1529 by the humanist Otto Brunfels. The first print appeared on September 1, 1518.

=== The editions ===
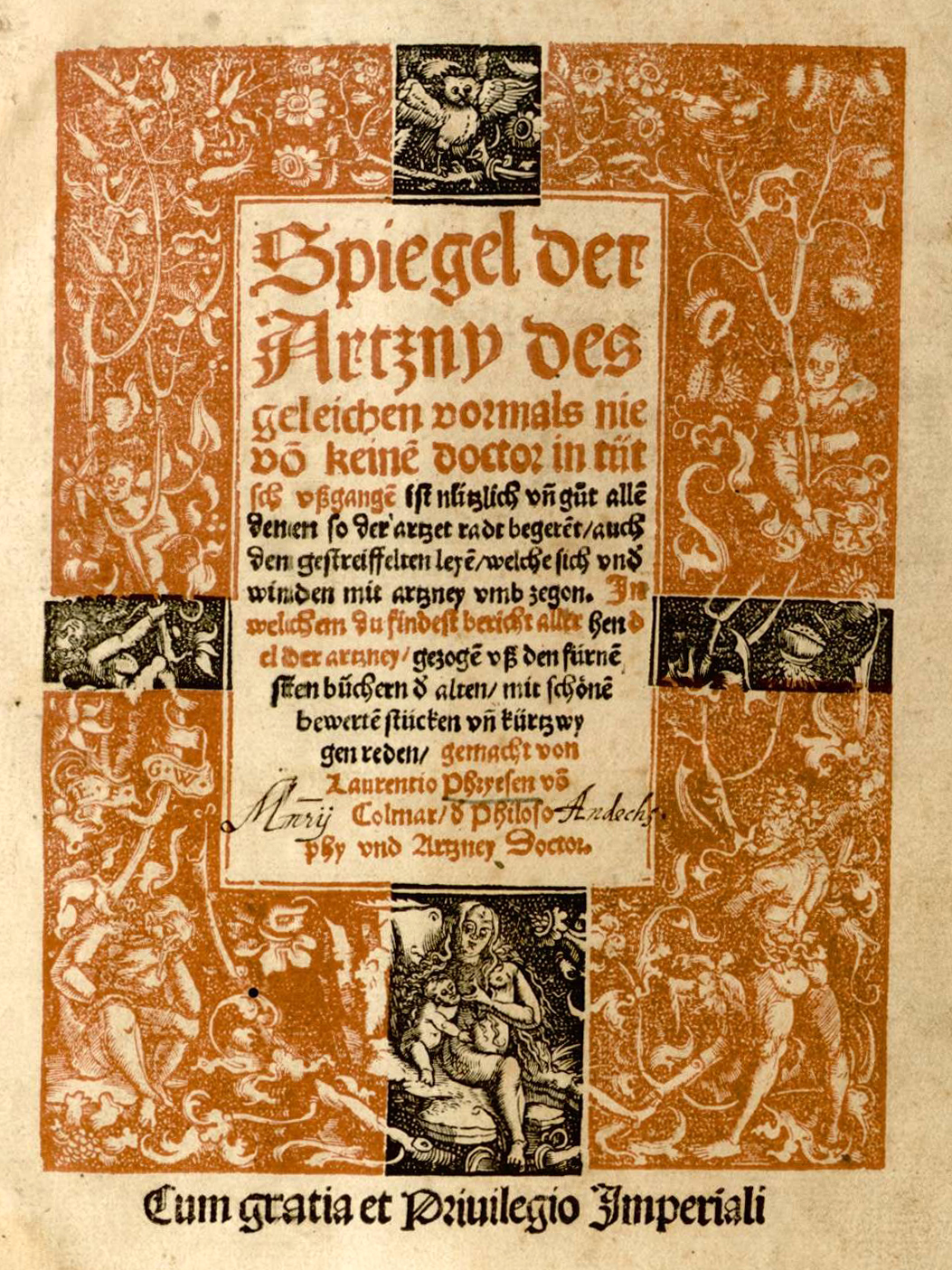
1518 edition, Grüninger

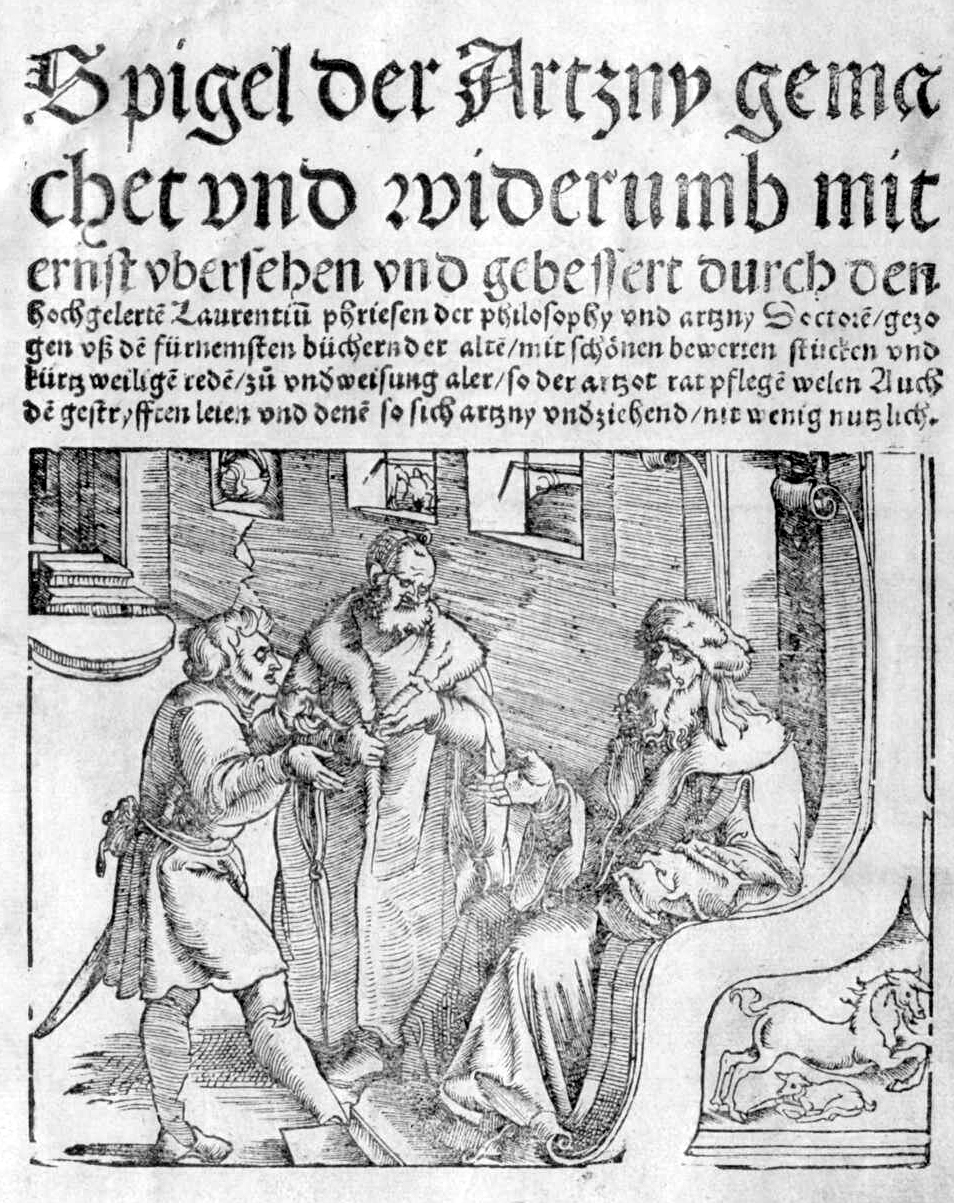
1529 edition, Grüninger

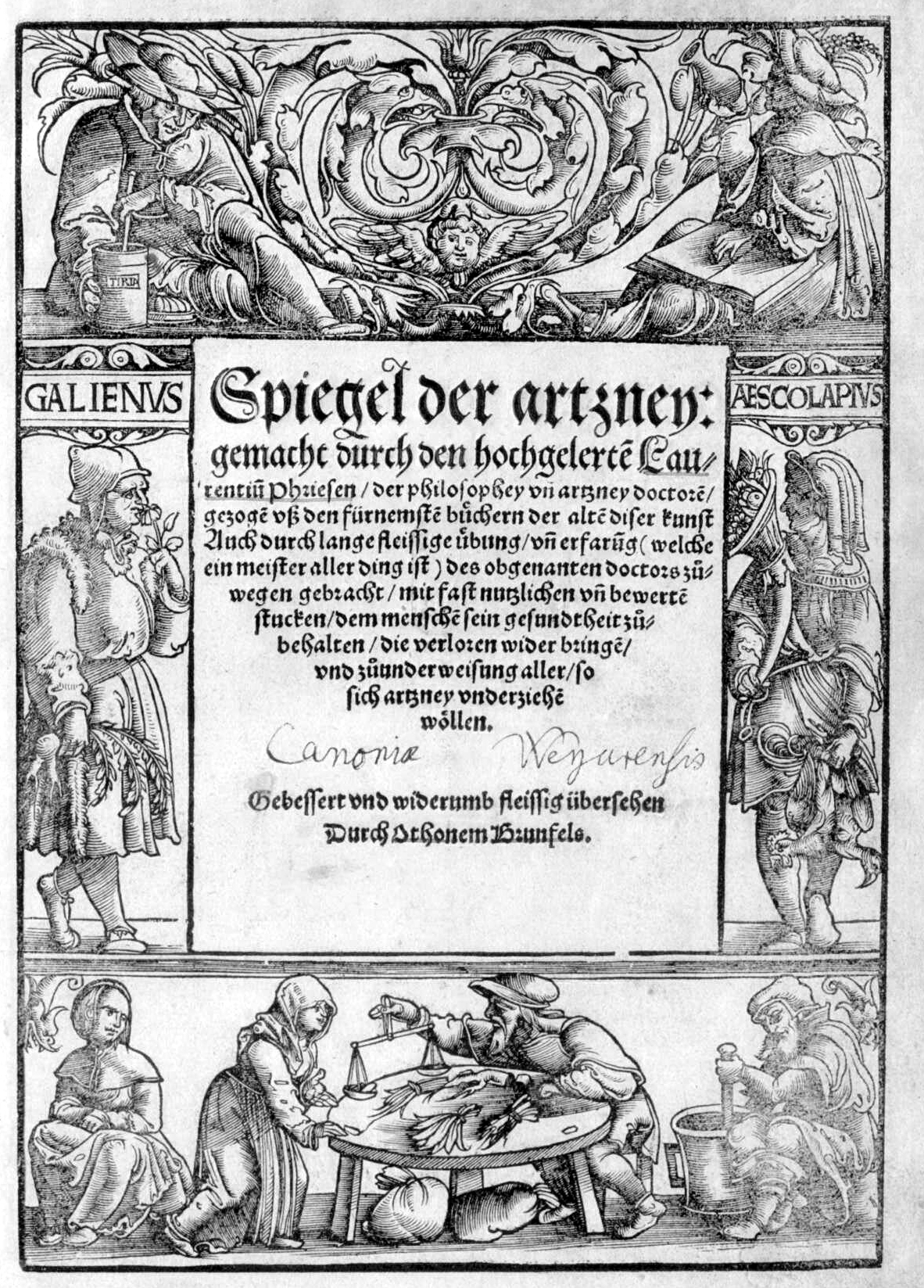
1529 edition, Beck

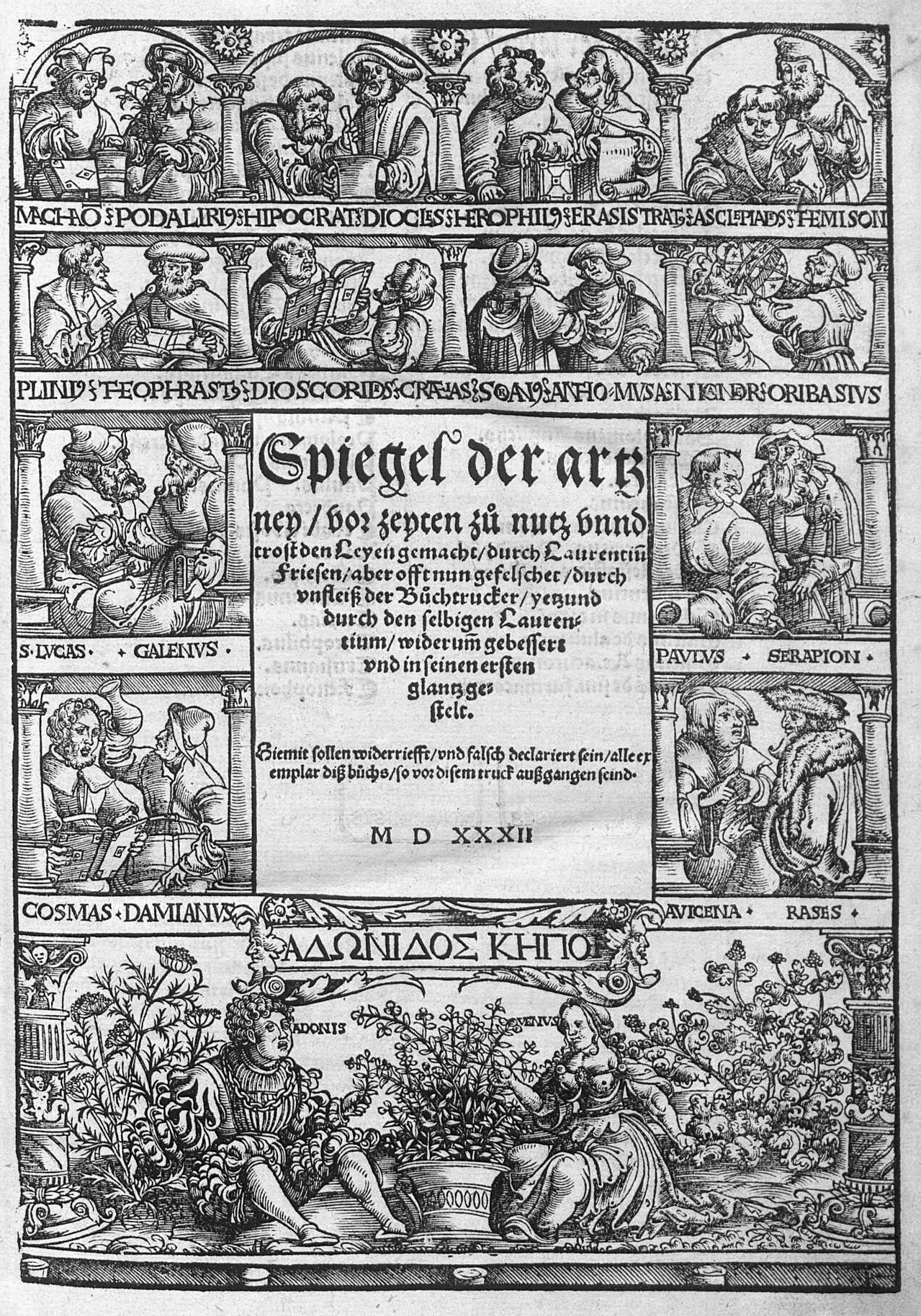
1532 edition, Beck

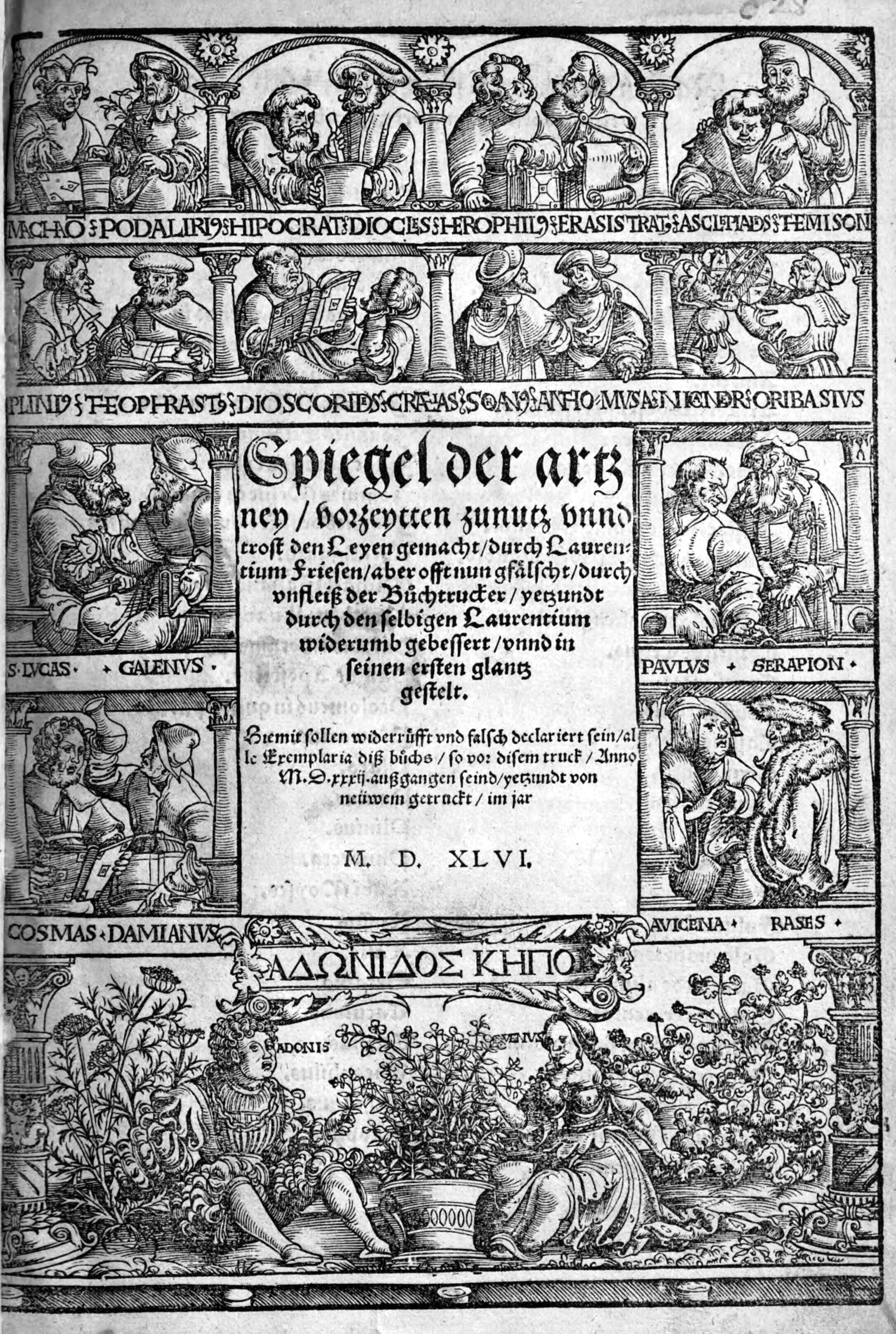
1546 edition, Beck
- Three editions published by Johannes Grüninger, Strasbourg: 1. September 1518; 1. September 1519; 17. March 1529
- In 1529 the publisher Balthasar Beck had the Spiegel der Arzney edited by Otto Brunfels in Strasbourg. Three editions of this version were printed: August 18, 1529, March 14, 1532 and 1546.
- In 1542, Johann Dryander prepared a new edition of Fries's Spiegel, added a short anatomy section and published it under the title Der ganzen Arznei gemeiner Inhalt with the publisher Christian Egenolph in Frankfurt. In 1547, Dryander added a section on surgery. For this, he used the German translation of the Kleine Wundarznei by Lanfranc of Milan, which had been prepared in 1528 by Otto Brunfels and printed by Christian Egenolph. Two further editions of the Mirror appeared in this form: 1547 and 1557.

The library of the Zürcher Medizinhistorischen Instituts (Zurich Institute of the History of Medicine) has two double folios in which the Spiegel der Arznei and the Kreuterbuch by Eucharius Rösslin have been bound together since the 16th century:

- 1st double folio: Spiegel der Arznei 1532 and Kreuterbuch 1533.
- 2nd double folio: Spiegel der Arznei 1546 and Kreuterbuch 1550.

=== The sources ===
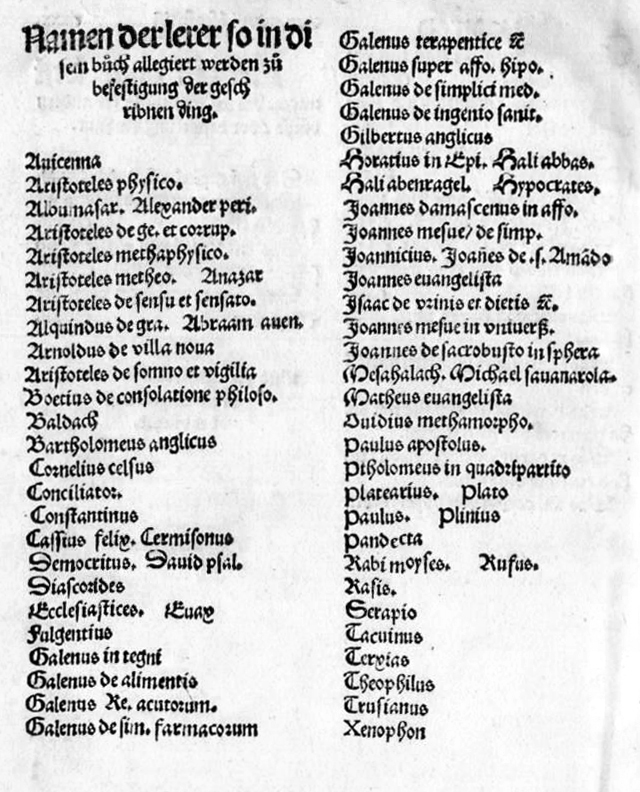
Sources of the Spiegel der Arznei 1518

Following the introduction, Fries lists his sources. It is hardly possible and no attempt has yet been made to list all of these sources in the Spiegel. The main source can be assumed to be Avicenna's Canon of Medicine, which - based in particular on Galen - gives a general overview of what we today call "internal medicine".

=== Target audience and German-Latin language dispute ===
The Mirror was a popular representation of the whole of "internal medicine". The title page of the first edition in 1518 claimed to be the first work on medicine in the German language. However, Der Spiegel was not the first work in German with medical content. The Arzneibuch by the Würzburg surgeon Ortolf von Baierland (1477) is worth mentioning, also the Gart der Gesundheit of the Frankfurt city doctor Johann Wonnecke von Kaub (1485), the Buch der Cirurgia (1497), and the Kleines Destillierbuch (1500) and the Großes Destillierbuch (1512) of the Strasbourg surgeon Hieronymus Brunschwig. Like Fries in his Spiegel der Arznei, Hieronymus Brunschwig also emphasized in his Kleines Destillierbuch that he had written his work to educate the sick and the "common paople". But the printed books were expensive and their use presupposed that the buyers could read. The Mirror of Medicine can be classified in the category of household literature. However, his writings in the vernacular and rejection of the tradition of medical writing in Latin brought Fries bitter opposition from the "learned doctors":

[this work] for which I have suffered much, is greatly hated and persecuted by the learned doctors, because I have revealed the content of this art to German tongues.

=== Images ===
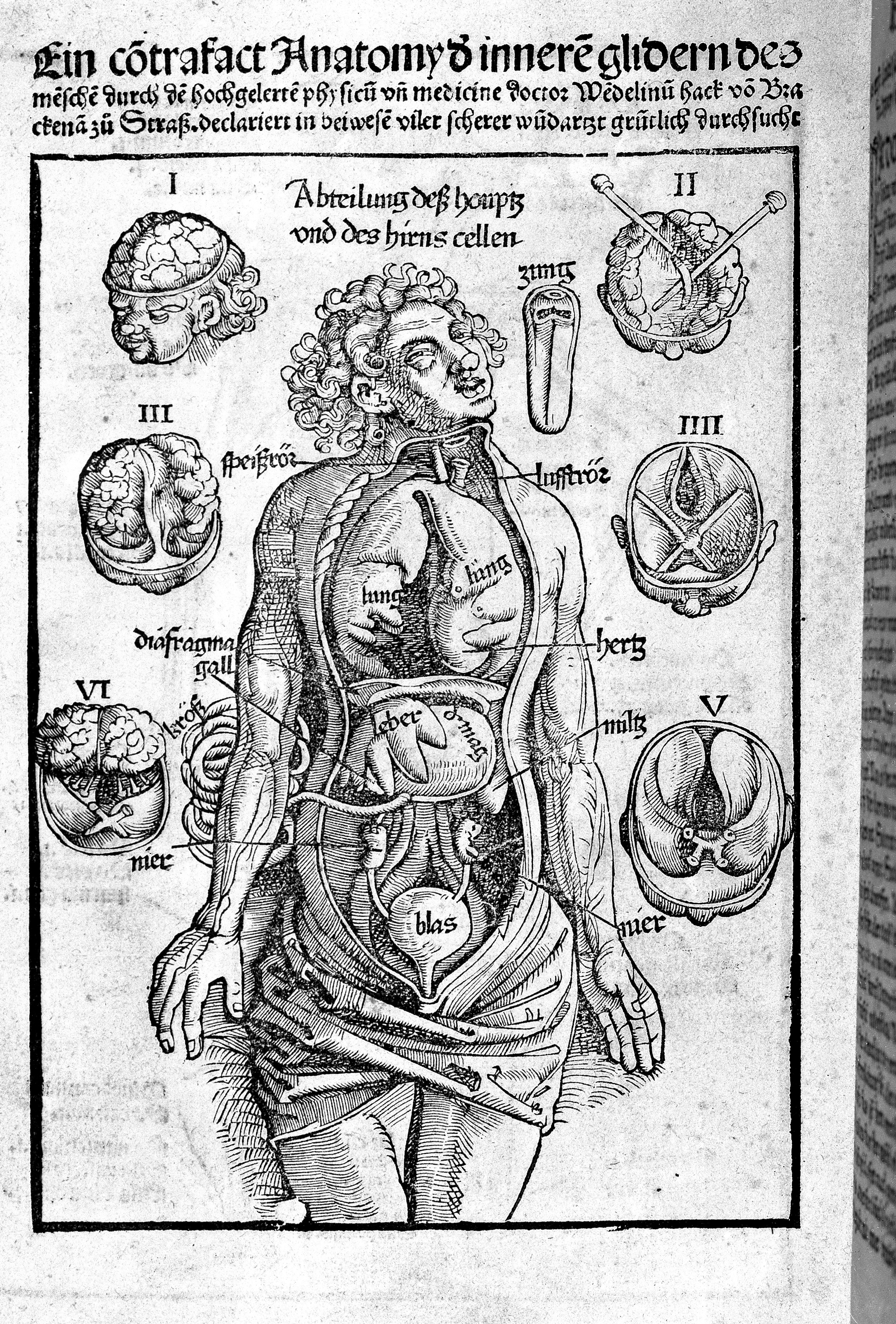
Anatomical Diagram from Spiegel der Artzny

The Mirror included a number of illustrations. The most important of these is an anatomical diagram of a public dissection in Strasbourg in 1517. The dissection, of a hanged man, was carried out by Dr. Wendelin Hock von Brackenau. The woodcut was not made specifically for the Mirror, but was a fugitive sheet, initially produced as a single broadsheet, and then published in the Feldtbuch der Wundartzney by Hans von Gersdorff in the same year. The illustration shows the body down to the knees, with the thoracic and abdominal cavities cut open. Surrounding this are six smaller figures showing the anatomy of the brain, and one of the tongue. This may well be the first published illustration of an actual dissection, and the images of the brain are the earliest realistic anatomical diagrams of that organ.

== Dispute with Martin Luther ==
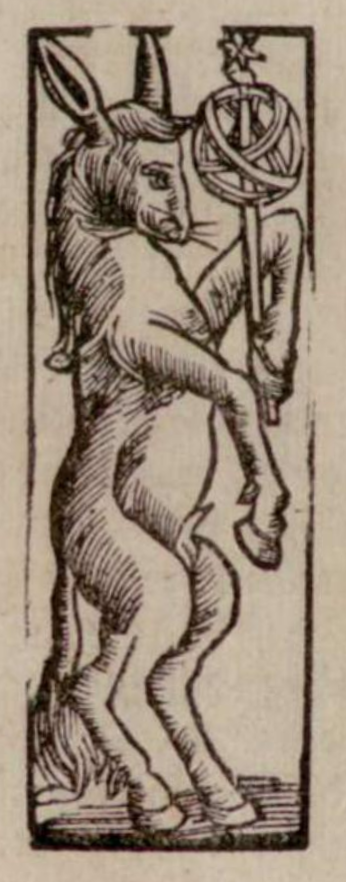
The Astronomer (Fries) as Ass. From Gouchmat and Practica

In 1518, Martin Luther published a sermon on the Ten Commandments, in which he denounced astrology as idolatrous superstition. Luther regarded such superstitions as representing "a lack of faith in divine providence". He particularly objected to electional astrology, the identification of propitious days for particular events to occur. A popular form of this was Egyptian days, particular days thought to have been identified by Egyptian astrologers, that were unlucky for commencing a work, or for blood-letting.

Fries responded to Luther in his Schirmrede of 1520. He argued that Luther was ignorant in not understanding the difference between folk-beliefs, and the astrologers' rigorous study of planetary motions and the phases of the moon, and he asserted that such knowledge was essential for many human activities, including the practice of medicine. He denied that astrology required any kind of spiritual intermediary - something that Luther identified as forbidden by the first commandment - but looked only to God and his works.

The Basel printer and writer Pamphilus Gengenbach also contributed to the argument in a very different way. In his Carnival play Gouchmat (fools for love) he casts Fries as the foolish doctor and astrologer, and ridicules some of his predictions. More seriously, in his Practica of 1523, he challenged what he saw as Fries's blasphemy in payng more attention to the stars than to the bible. Such arguments - which continued long after Fries left reformed Strasbourg - concerned an issue of much wider importance to the reformers than astrology, the value of scriptural as opposed to other potential sources of truth.

== Defence of Avicenna ==
The 14th- to 16th-century movement later known as humanism sought a return to the culture of ancient Greece and Rome, both by recovering and translating original source texts, and by establishing a curriculum of study based on that culture. In medicine, the works of classical authors such as Galen were known, but often through translations into Latin from Arabic texts. As well as studying these works, Islamic scholars had considerably extended medical knowledge, and the most notable of these, the Persian physician Ibn Sīnā, known in the west as Avicenna, had compiled an encyclopedia, The Canon of Medicine that had been one of the main sources of medical education in Europe for several centuries. During this period there was a great increase in the knowledge of the Greek language in Western Europe, many original texts by classical authors were discovered, and techniques for critical analysis were developed, leading to a much better understanding of classical learning. At the same time there was a widespread disparagement of Arabic and Islamic culture, language and scholarship, leading to the removal of texts such as the Canon from medical teaching, and attempts to eliminate medical terms of Arabic origin.

Fries published his defence of Avicenna in 1530, at the height of this controversy. He regarded the preference for Greek over Islamic writings as based on an emotional attachment to classical languages rather than on evidence. He refers to "the deceptive eloquence of Greek and Latin" and quotes Celsus as saying "Diseases are cured not by eloquence but by remedies". He attacked the idea that experience is more important than reason, epitomised by Paracelsus publicly burning the works of Avicenna and Galen in 1527, and argued for the importance of a sound theoretical background to inform the practice of medicine. But also Avicenna provided detailed accounts both of ailments and remedies, based on his theoretical understanding. Fries's defence did not stem the tide of anti-Arabism. Leonhart Fuchs wrote in 1555: "It is best to reject the Arabs completely and just to abandon them, the barbarians of a bygone age... "; and his University, Tübingen wrote opposition to the teaching of Arab authors into its statutes after he became rector in 1535. But Avicenna and other Islamic authorities remained important in western European medical teaching for at least another century.

== Cartography ==
During his period in Strasbourg, Fries became involved in map production through his connection with Johann Grüninger, the publisher of Spiegel der Artzny. Fries's first map, published in 1520, was a collaboration with Peter Apian on a much reduced version of the Waldseemüller world map of 1507.

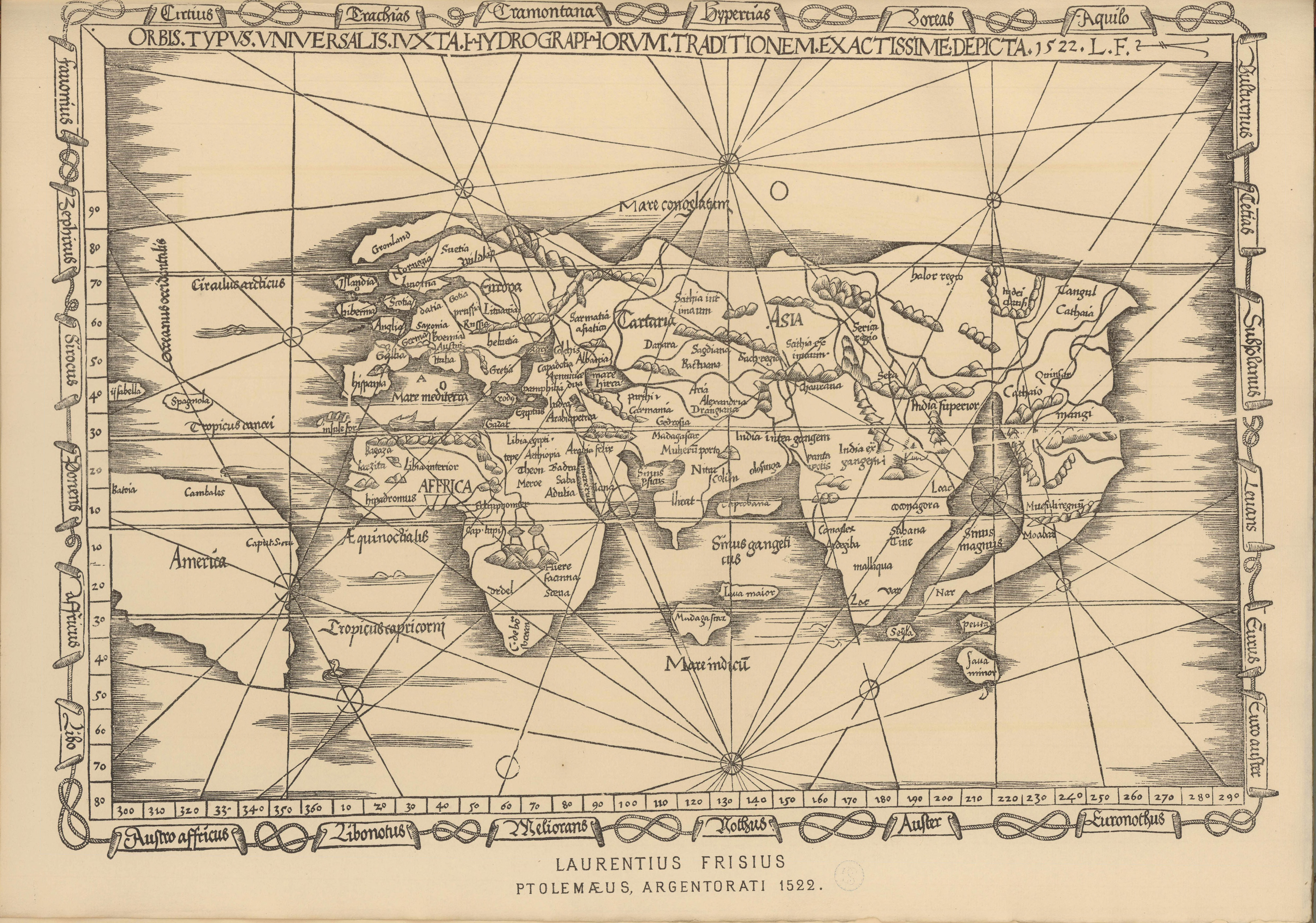
Fries 1522 World map

Fries prepared a new edition of Ptolemy's Geography, which was published by Grüninger in 1522. It includes 27 maps based on Ptolemy's original descriptions, and 20 new maps, including a map of the world by Fries which is the first map to name America in an edition of Ptolemy. A further edition was published in 1525, with a new translation by Willibald Pirckheimer, which used most of the same maps as the 1522 edition, as well as additional woodcut illustrations.

Fries's final project for Grüninger was a reduction of Waldseemüller's Carta Marina Navigatoria, a Portolan style world map, with text in German rather than Latin. This was published in 1525, though the earliest surviving copy is from 1530.

Later writers have severely criticised the quality of Fries's cartographic work. Nordenskiöld (1889) describes the 1522 world map as "bad beyond all criticism". Fischer and von Wieser (1903) describe the Carta Marina as "crudely drawn and swarms with the most fantastic errors and misconceptions". And Taylor (1928) judges his cartographic skills to be "very inferior to that of Waldseemüller". But Fries's contributions were important in continuing the work of Martin Waldseemüller and in producing two editions of Ptolemy.

== Works cited ==
- Gerhard Baader: Medizinisches Reformdenken und Arabismus im Deutschland des 16. Jahrhunderts. … Lorenz Fries, der Verteidiger des Arabismus. In: Sudhoffs Archiv. Volume 63, Issue 3, 1979, pp. 287–289.
- Karl Baas: Studien zur Geschichte des mittelalterlichen Medizinalwesens in Colmar. In: Zeitschrift für die Geschichte des Oberrheins. Volume 61, 1907 (New Series, Volume 22), pp. 217–246, cited section: pp. 230–234.
- Josef Benzing: Bibliographie der Schriften des Colmarer Arztes Lorenz Fries. In: Philobiblon. Neue Folge. Volume 6, 1962, pp. 120–140.
- Karl Bittel: Lorenz Fries und andere Elsässer Ärzte um 1500. In: Straßburger Monatshefte. Volume 7, 1943, pp. 467–472.
- Karl Bittel: Die Elsässer Zeit des Paracelsus, Hohenheims Wirken in Straßburg und Kolmar, sowie seine Beziehungen zu Lorenz Fries. In: Elsaß-Lothringisches Jahrbuch. Volume 21, 1943, pp. 157–186.
- Jean Michel Friedrich. Laurent Fries, médecin, astrologue et géographe de la Renaissance à Colmar, Strasbourg et Metz. Medizinische Dissertation Straßburg 1980.
- Werner E. Gerabek: Fries [Friesz, Frisius, Frise, Phries, Phryes, Phrisius], Lorenz. In: Werner E. Gerabek, Bernhard D. Haage, Gundolf Keil, Wolfgang Wegner (Hrsg.): Enzyklopädie Medizingeschichte. De Gruyter, Berlin / New York 2005, ISBN 3-11-015714-4, pp. 441.
- Rudolf Christian Ludwig Öhlschlegel: Studien zu Lorenz Fries und seinem „Spiegel der Arznei“. Medizinische Dissertation Tübingen 1985.
- Charles Schmidt: Laurent Fries de Colmar, médecin, astrologue, géographe à Strasbourg et à Metz. In: Annales de l’est. Revue trimestrielle publiée sous la direction de la Faculté des Lettres de Nancy. 4, 1890, pp. 523–575 (digitized copy).
- Karl Sudhoff: Ein Kapitel aus der Geschichte der Setzerwillkür im XVI. Jahrhundert. In: Zeitschrift für Bücherfreunde. 6, 1902/1903, pp. 79–81 (digitized copy), und in: Sudhoffs Archiv. Volume 21, 1929, pp. 117–120.
- Karl Sudhoff (1904). "Fries, Lorenz" . Allgemeine Deutsche Biographie (in German). Vol. 49. Leipzig: Duncker & Humblot. pp. 770–775.
- Joachim Telle: Wissenschaft und Öffentlichkeit im Spiegel der deutschen Arzneibuchliteratur. Zum deutsch-lateinischen Sprachenstreit in der Medizin des 16. und 17. Jahrhunderts. In: Medizinhistorisches Journal. Volume 14, 1979, pp. 32–52
- Joachim Telle: Arzneikunst und der „gemeine Mann“. Zum deutsch-lateinischen Sprachenstreit in der frühneuzeitlichen Medizin. In: Pharmazie und der gemeine Mann. Hausarznei und Apotheke in den deutschen Schriften der frühen Neuzeit. Wolfenbüttel 1982, ISBN 3-88373-032-7, pp. 43–48.
- Ernest Wickersheimer: Deux régimes de santé: Laurent Fries et Simon Reichwein à Robert de Monreal, abbé d'Echternach de 1506 à 1539. In: Hémecht. Zeitschrift für Luxemburger Geschichte. Revue d'histoire luxembourgeoise. 10/1, 1957, pp. 59–71. (Separatdruck: Saint-Paul, Luxemburg 1957).
