= Simon de Phares =

French astrologer (fl. 1450–1499)

Simon de Phares (fl. 1444–1499) was a French astrologer and natural philosopher who is known from his works and the manuscripts that he collected. He served in the court of Duke John II of Bourbon. He is known only by his work Recueil des plus célèbres astrologues et quelques hommes doctes written to appeal against allegations of sorcery made against him.

Simon was born possibly in Meung-sur-Loire and little is known about his early life. He studied law in Orleans and studied at Paris before working under Mathieu de Nanterre and afterwards under John II of Bourbon. He studied under Conrad Heingarter, travelled to England, Scotland and Ireland before returning to France. He also travelled to Italy, Egypt and Switzerland. After 1488 he settled in Lyons where he raised a family and established a large library and continued to provide astrological services. King Charles VIII sought him in 1490 but shortly after, he was accused of sorcery and his library was confiscated. He then moved to Paris and wrote a work justifying astrology and to appeal against the actions made against him.

This work contains an early history of the understanding of astronomy from the period and claims on the art of divination. These include notes on the comet of 1402 that he called Verru, the teaching of medicine and astrology in France and numerous other aspects of the period.

Editions of the work were published in 1929 by Ernest Wickersheimer and in 1997/1999 by Jean-Patrice Boudet.
