= Johann Grüninger =

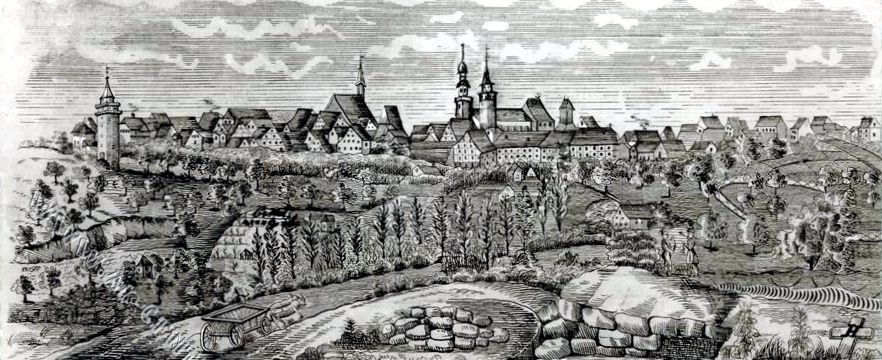
Ink drawing of Markgröningen by Jakob Gottfried

Johannes (Hans) Grüninger (1455–1533) was a German printer whose career spanned from 1482 to 1533 and produced up to 500 publications. Grüninger was one of the single most prolific printers of Strasbourg, printing up to 80 books a year. While a great deal of his publications were Catholic, he managed to print a great variety of works ranging from humanist to scientific texts. His work was fairly equally representative of both Latin and the vernacular; about 39% of his works were printed in Latin and the remaining 61% in German.

Grüninger was born as Johannes Reinhart in 1455 in the town of Markgröningen, Württemberg (from which he took his name "Grüninger"). He learned about the printing trade in Basel before he moved to Strasbourg which was experiencing a boom in the printing industry. Between 1508 and 1528 about 70 printers had established themselves in Strasbourg. Grüninger had a head start on this competition and in 1481 he moved to Strasbourg. A year later bought his print shop and in August 1483, he printed his first book, Petrus Comestor's Historia Scholastica. Some of his notable publications include a German-language Bible, and illustrated editions of Horace's Opera, and Virgil's Aeneid. Grüninger died in 1532 and was succeeded by his sons Wolfgang and Bartholomew (primarily Bartholomew, who was also a printer albeit on a smaller scale than his father). As was common, his sons promptly sold the business to Peter Schöffer the younger in 1533 after being unable to maintain past production rates.

== Notable publications ==
Religious Texts

Grüninger was responsible for printing many Breviaries for dioceses across the Holy Roman Empire, especially in the first decade of his career. In fact, he was one of the chief printers of breviaries within the Empire. He also printed many missals that were transported across Europe. His largest contribution to the printed religious text is his German family Bible which was the tenth Bible printed in the German language and the first "handy-sized" Bible. Grüninger's Bible was printed in two volumes, each containing about 460 leaves and was illustrated with 109 woodcuts. At 28 x 20 cm this Bible was almost half the size of the average printed Bible at the time. In 1522 Grüninger found himself in trouble with the Strasbourg authorities after publishing an anti-Lutheran book by Thomas Murner titled Von dem Grössen Lutherischen Narren." At the time, the reformation had a strong presence in Strasbourg and in response, Strasbourg officials confiscated Grüninger's prints of Murner's book.

Classics

Despite printing primarily religious texts, Grüninger printed three major Classical texts in his career. In 1496 he printed Terence's Comidiae, in 1498 he printed Horace's Opera, and in 1502 he printed Virgil's Aeneid.

Horace's Opera (1498)

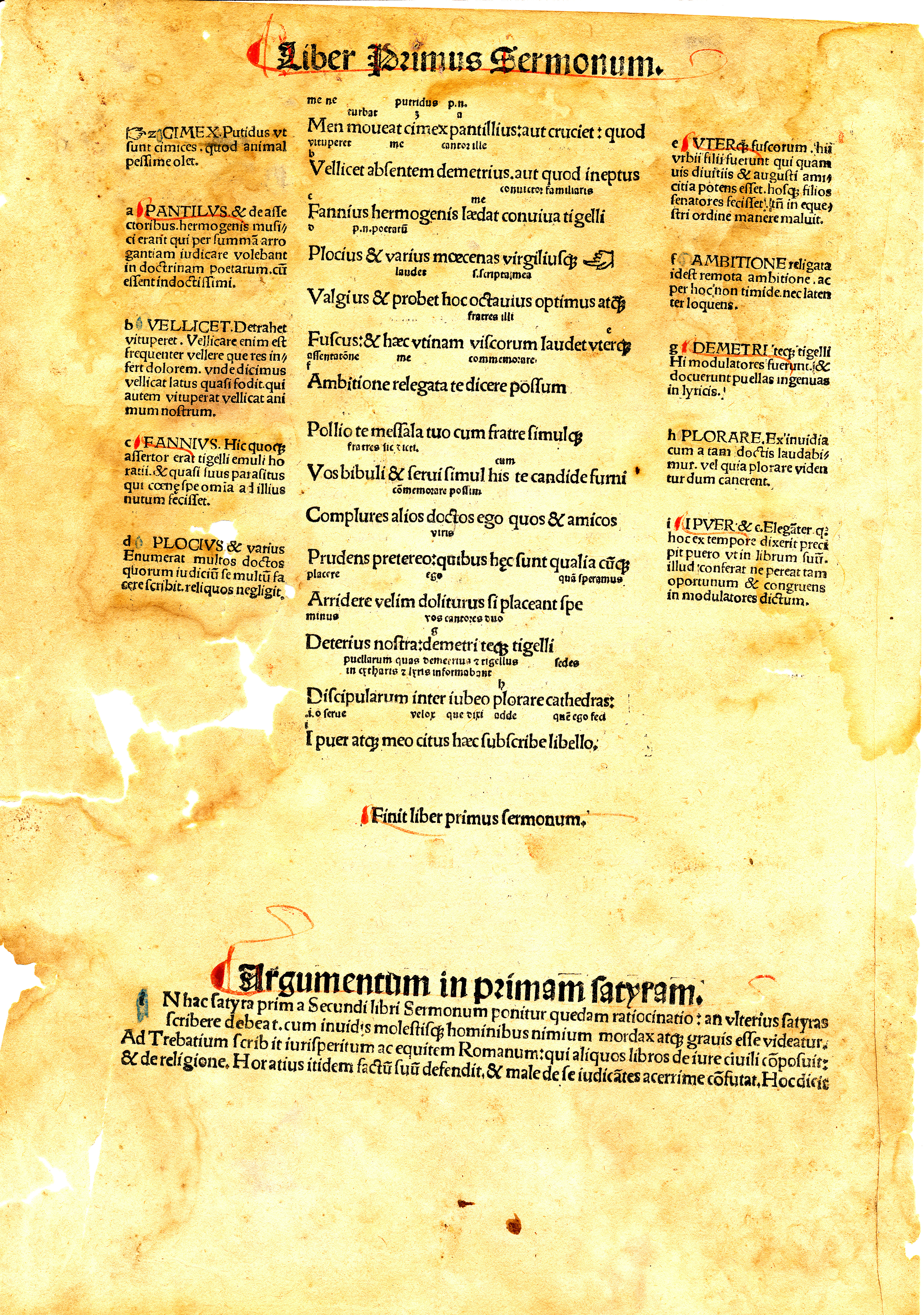
Leaf from Grüninger's publication of Horace's Opera printed in 1498. This particular leaf is from the last fifteen lines of satire 1.10.

In 1498, Grüninger printed the first illustrated edition of Horace's Opera with commentary by Jakob Locher. This is the only printing of Horace before 1500 to contain commentary. It has been argued that this printing of Horace was intended for pedagogical purposes rather than merely entertainment. Locher was a humanist and stated in an epigram that Horace was not for the consumption of ordinary people, but for the educated. He probably intended this book to be for those either learning Latin and Horace or already learned in these topics which could explain this text's unique use of marginal commentaries which are in keeping with medieval pedagogical tradition (except that they seem to provide more background information on the poetry than directions on how to morally read the text). In between the lines of the text itself can be seen explanatory words that clarify abbreviations and names thus helping the reader follow along while at the same time learning some Latin conventions. Given that there seem to be a decent number of surviving copies, this (and Grüninger's prints of Comidiae by Terence (1496) and Vergil's Aeneid (1502)) book seems to have been a success when released.

Virgil's Aeneid (1502)

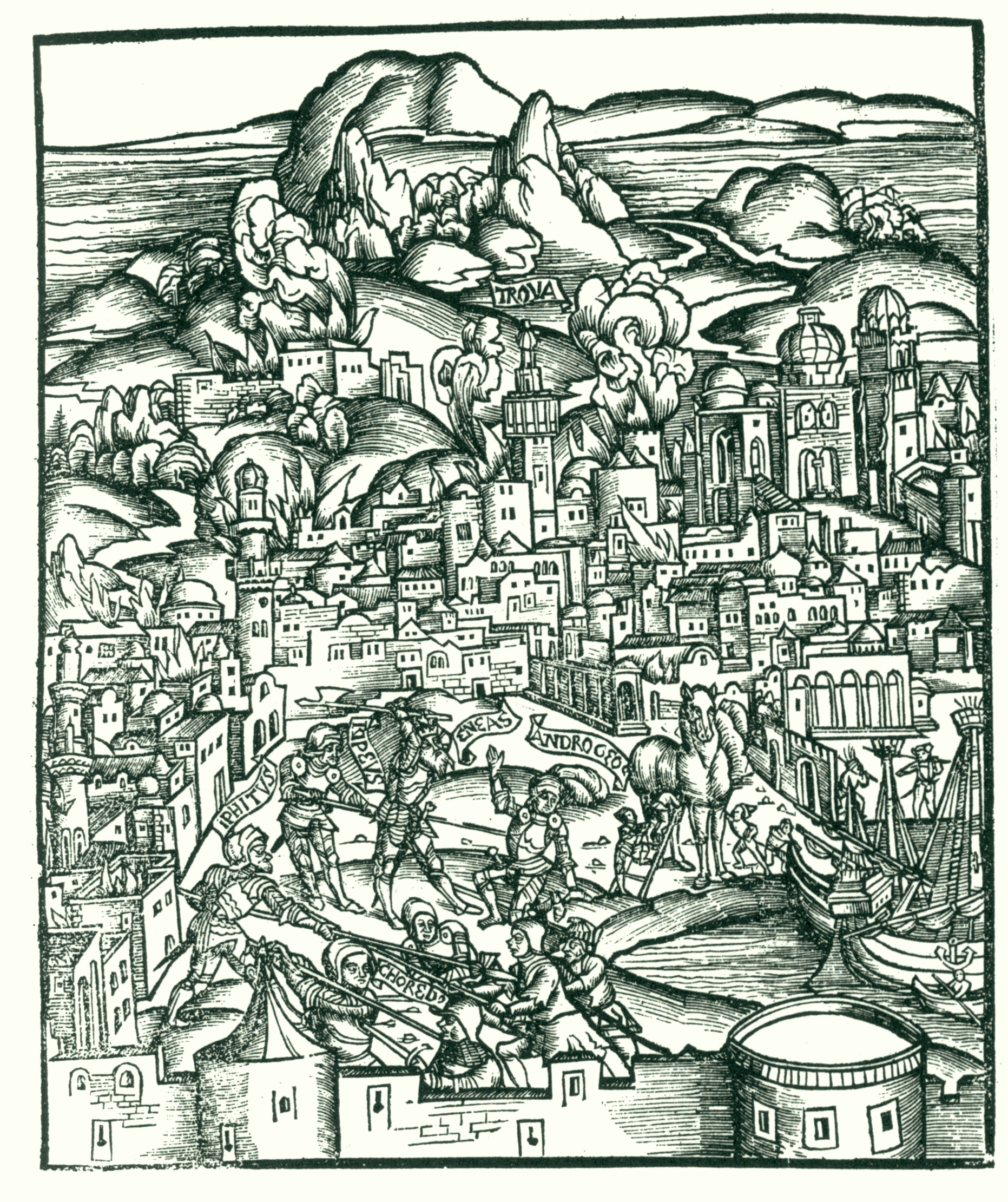
Woodcut from Brant's Aeneid printed by Grüninger in September 1502

Grüninger's 1502 publication of the Aeneid was edited by Sebastian Brant, who also wrote the well known Ship of Fools in 1494. The woodcuts in the Aeneid are notable in that they depict characters and architecture in contemporary clothing and style.

Geography

Grüninger printed nearly 100,000 woodcut maps between 1510 and 1530. He was the most prolific printer of wall maps in the entire Holy Roman Empire of his time. The main geographic works that came out of Grüninger's press were an edition of Ptolemy's Geography prepared by Lorenz Fries (1521), another edition of the Geography in 1525, and a reduced version of Martin Waldseemüller's Carta Marina, also prepared by Fries in 1525.
