= Ernest Wickersheimer =

French physician, librarian and historian of medicine

Charles Adolphe Ernest Wickersheimer
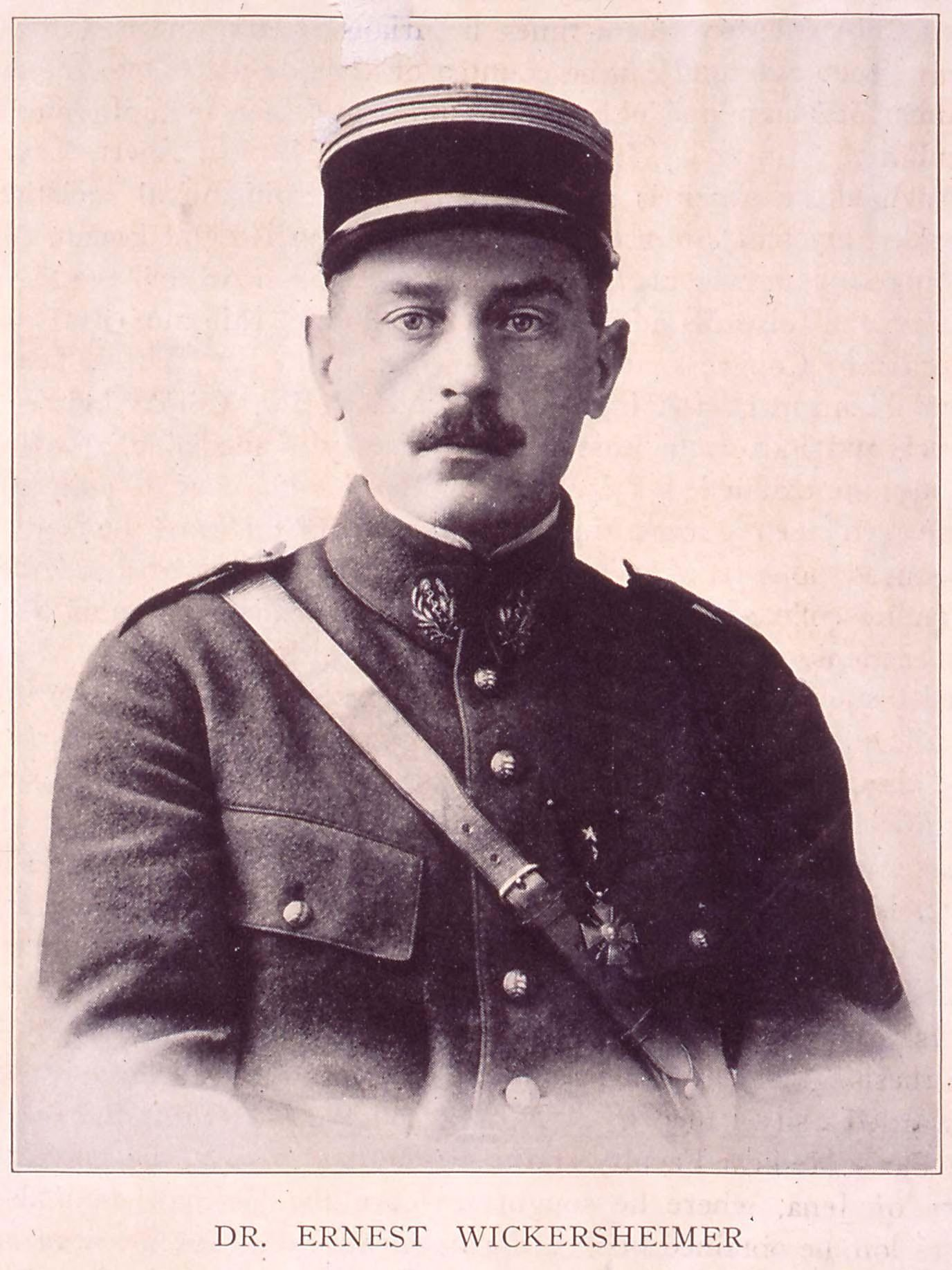
- Wickersheimer in military uniform, 1922
- Born: July 12, 1880; Bar-le-Duc, France
- Died: August 6, 1965 (aged 85); Strasbourg, France
- Education: University of Paris
- Occupations: Physician, Librarian, Historian of Medicine
- Known for: Dictionnaire biographique des médecins en France au Moyen-Âge; Edition of Simon de Phares' manuscript
- Awards: Croix de Guerre, Officer of the Legion of Honour
- Medical career
- Profession: Medicine, Library Science, History
- Field: History of Medicine
- Institutions: Library of the Medical Department of the University of Paris, Académie de Médecine, University of Jena, University of Leipzig, Strasbourg Library, Bibliothèque Nationale et Universitaire de Strasbourg, Académie Internationale d’Histoire des Sciences

Charles Adolphe Ernest Wickersheimer (12 July 1880 – 6 August 1965) was a French physician, librarian, and historian of medicine. He worked as a librarian at the Académie de Médecine.

Wickersheimer was born in Bar-le-Duc where his father was a military doctor from Alsace. His mother Emma Sophie Madeleine Stahl was the sister of the botanist Christian Ernst Stahl. He grew up speaking both French and German. He studied medicine at the Paris Faculty of Medicine and received a doctor of medicine in 1905 for a dissertation La médecine et les médecins en France à l'épogue de la Renaissance ("Medicine and physicians in France during the Renaissance"). He then trained as a librarian at the University of Jena and worked at the library of the medical department of the University of Paris. He also interned at the University of Jena and worked with Karl Sudhoff at the University of Leipzig examining German sources on the history of medicine. In 1909 he became a librarian at the Sorbonne and in 1910 he succeeded Léon Laloy as librarian at the Académie de Médecine. He served in the war as Medecin-aide-major during World War I and received a Croix de Guerre medal. He became a director of the Strasbourg library after the war. In 1926 he published Anatomies de Mondino dei Luzzi et de Guido de Vigevano. He published the landmark two-volume dictionary of medical biography Dictionnaire biographique des médecins en France au Moyen-Ãge (1936). He also produced an edition of Simon de Phares' manuscript in 1929 which enabled a study of medieval astrology. He lost his position during German occupation and returned only after World War II to rebuild the library and retired in 1950. He was made officer of the Legion of Honour in 1948. He died in Strasbourg as the honorary administrator of the Bibliothèque Nationale et Universitaire de Strasbourg. He was a long time editor of the Bulletin de la Societe Francaise d'Histoire de la Medecine. He was the fifth president of the International Society for the History of Medicine from 1953 to 1964 and he also served as the permanent secretary of the Académie Internationale d’Histoire des Sciences.

Wickersheimer married Edith Rudolph of Indiana outlived her husband and lived in Schiltigheim. She edited his last work which was published posthumously, "Les manuscrits latins de médecine du haut Moyen Âge dans les bibliothèques de France." She was also a scholar of French literature and attended the medical history conferences with her husband. She died on 2 May 1970.
