= Fach =

Method of classifying singers

The German Fach system (German pronunciation: [fax]; literally "compartment" or "subject of study", here in the sense of "vocal specialization") is a method of classifying singers, primarily opera singers, according to the range, weight, and color of their voices. Although the year of origin is not exactly known, it is approximated to have been created in the mid-to-late 19th century. It is used worldwide, but primarily in Europe, especially in German-speaking countries and by repertory opera houses.

The Fach system is a convenience for singers and opera houses. It prevents singers from being asked to sing roles which they are incapable of performing, or roles for which their vocal timbre is dramatically unsuited. Opera companies keep lists of available singers by Fach so that when they are casting roles for an upcoming production, they do not inadvertently contact performers who would be inappropriate for the part.

Below is a list of Fächer (German pronunciation: [ˈfɛçɐ]), their ranges as written on sheet music, and roles generally considered appropriate to each. When two names for the Fach are given, the first is in more common use today. Where possible, an English and/or Italian equivalent of each Fach is listed; however, not all Fächer have ready English or Italian equivalents.

Note that some roles can be sung by more than one Fach and that many singers do not easily fit into a Fach: for instance some sopranos may sing both Koloratursopran and Dramatischer Koloratursopran roles. In addition, roles traditionally more difficult to cast may be given to a voice other than the traditional Fach. For instance, the "Queen of the Night" and "Violetta" are more traditionally dramatic coloratura roles, but it is difficult to find a dramatic coloratura to sing it (particularly given the extreme range). Therefore, these roles are often sung by a lyric coloratura.

== Soprano Fächer ==
=== Lyrischer Koloratursopran / Koloratursoubrette ===

- English equivalent: coloratura soprano or lyric coloratura soprano
- Range: From about middle C (C_{4}) to the F two-and-a-half octaves above middle C (F_{6})
- Description: Usually (but not always) a light soprano who has a high voice. Can often have small voices lacking the richness and resonance of a dramatic soprano. Must be able to do fast acrobatics with easy high notes. Many have extremely high ranges (with notes above the F of the "Queen of the Night"), but there are also singers in this Fach who do not regularly sing higher than the high E♭_{6}.
- Roles:
  - Adina, L'elisir d'amore (Gaetano Donizetti)
  - Aminta, Die schweigsame Frau (Richard Strauss)
  - Blonde, Die Entführung aus dem Serail (Wolfgang Amadeus Mozart)
  - Cunegonde, Candide (Leonard Bernstein)
  - Frasquita, Carmen (Bizet)
  - Juliette, Roméo et Juliette (Gounod)
  - Marie, La fille du régiment (Gaetano Donizetti)
  - Olympia, Les contes d'Hoffman (Jacques Offenbach)
  - Oscar, Un ballo in maschera (Giuseppe Verdi)
  - Zerbinetta, Ariadne auf Naxos (Richard Strauss)
  - The woodbird, Siegfried (Richard Wagner)

=== Dramatischer Koloratursopran ===

- English equivalent: Dramatic coloratura soprano
- Range: From about middle C (C_{4}) to the F two and a half octaves above middle C (F_{6})
- Description: The same as above, only with a more dramatic, rich voice. Often heavier and more lyrical than a coloratura soprano. Must also be able to do fast vocal acrobatics and reach high notes, such as the F_{6} of the "Queen of the Night". One must not mistake the Mozartian dramatic coloratura soprano with the Italian dramatic coloratura soprano. A singer that sings Konstanze, Donna Anna or Fiordiligi can not necessarily sing the Italian dramatic coloratura parts, due to other vocal demands. Imogene, Leonora and Violetta require a dramatic soprano voice and are most often sung by dramatic sopranos with an agile voice that can easily produce coloratura and high notes. Roles like Norma, Lady Macbeth, Odabella or Abigaille are good examples of Italian roles that are not necessarily a coloratura soprano (even though the score calls for coloratura singing), but a full bodied dramatic soprano with a voice that can handle extreme dramatic singing and that is flexible enough to sing coloratura. Giuseppe Verdi wrote many parts like this in his early years.
- Roles:
  - Abigalle, Nabucco (Giuseppe Verdi)
  - Donna Anna, Don Giovanni (Wolfgang Amadeus Mozart)
  - Elvira, I puritani (Vincenzo Bellini)
  - Fiordiligi, Così fan tutte (Wolfgang Amadeus Mozart)
  - Gilda, Rigoletto (Giuseppe Verdi)
  - Konstanze, Die Entführung aus dem Serail (Wolfgang Amadeus Mozart)
  - Leonora, Il trovatore (Giuseppe Verdi)
  - Norma, Norma (Vincenzo Bellini)
  - Odabella, Attila (Giuseppe Verdi)
  - The Queen of the Night, Die Zauberflöte (Wolfgang Amadeus Mozart)
  - Violetta, La traviata (Giuseppe Verdi)

=== Deutsche Soubrette / Charaktersopran ===

- English equivalent: Soubrette
- Range: From about middle C (C_{4}) to the C two octaves above middle C (C_{6})
- Description: A beautiful, sweet light lyric voice usually capable of executing florid passages similarly to that of a coloratura. The range is usually intermediate between that of a coloratura and lyric soprano. Most sopranos start out as soubrettes, changing fach as the voice matures.
- Roles:
  - Adele, Die Fledermaus (J. Strauss II)
  - Barbarina, Le nozze di Figaro (Wolfgang Amadeus Mozart)
  - Clotilde, Norma (Vincenzo Bellini)
  - Despina, Così fan tutte (Wolfgang Amadeus Mozart)
  - Echo, Ariadne auf Naxos (Richard Strauss)
  - Musetta, La Boheme (Giacomo Puccini)
  - Papagena, Die Zauberflöte (Wolfgang Amadeus Mozart)
  - Servilia, La clemenza di Tito (Wolfgang Amadeus Mozart)
  - Sophie, Der Rosenkavalier (Richard Strauss)
  - Susanna, Le nozze di Figaro (Wolfgang Amadeus Mozart)
  - Zerlina, Don Giovanni (Wolfgang Amadeus Mozart)

=== Lyrischer Sopran ===

- English equivalent: lyric soprano
- Range: From about B below middle C (B_{3}) to the C two octaves above middle C (C_{6})
- Description: A more supple soprano, capable of legato, portamento, and some agility; generally has a more soulful and sensuous quality than a soubrette, who tends to be largely flirtatious and somewhat tweety. The voice is very common; thus the purity and character of the basic timbre is essential. It is the "basic" soprano voice which is at neither extremes of the soprano range of voices; it is not known for having particular vocal attributes such as power, stamina, technical prowess, or agility. However, there are several lyric sopranos that possess a quantity of many of these vocal attributes, thus allowing them to sing a broader variety of roles. Nevertheless, the core of the true fundamentally lyric voice does not encompass such traits. Innocence, vulnerability and pathos are usually conveyed in the music written for the characters portrayed by the lyric soprano because of this endearing simplicity. This fach is also famous because the voices usually remain especially fresh until advanced age.
- Roles:
  - Antonia, Les contes d'Hoffman (Jacques Offenbach)
  - Gretel, Hänsel und Gretel (Engelbert Humperdinck)
  - Lauretta, Gianni Schicchi (Giacomo Puccini)
  - Liù, Turandot (Giacomo Puccini)
  - Micaëla, Carmen (Georges Bizet)
  - Pamina, Die Zauberflöte (Wolfgang Amadeus Mozart)
  - Rusalka, Rusalka (Antonín Dvořák)
  - Sophie, Werther (Jules Massenet)
  - Susanna, Le nozze di Figaro (Wolfgang Amadeus Mozart)
  - Mimi, La bohème (Giacomo Puccini)

=== Jugendlich dramatischer Sopran ===

- English equivalent: spinto soprano
- Range: From about A below middle C (A_{3}) to the C two octaves above middle C (C_{6})
- Description: The Italian version of this fach is the spinto, which literally translated means pushed. However this is not accurate in terms of these singers' vocal production. A lyric dramatic soprano has a lyric instrument that can also create big sounds, cutting through an orchestral or choral climax. This voice is sometimes referred to as a "young" or "youthful" dramatic soprano although this term doesn't necessarily refer to the singer's age but rather to the tonal quality of the voice. This fach is more clearly delineated in the German system than in the American system. Depending on the singer, however, this voice type can be versatile, as it lies at neither extreme of the soprano spectrum. Spintos are occasionally able to take on lighter mezzo roles or conversely, lyric and even coloratura roles.
- Roles:
  - Agathe, Der Freischütz (Carl Maria von Weber)
  - Amelia, Un ballo in maschera (Giuseppe Verdi)
  - Chrysothemis, Elektra (Richard Strauss)
  - Cio-Cio San, Madama Butterfly (Giacomo Puccini)
  - Donna Elvira, Don Giovanni (Wolfgang Amadeus Mozart)
  - Elisabeth, Tannhäuser (Richard Wagner)
  - Elsa, Lohengrin (Richard Wagner)
  - Maddalena, Andrea Chénier (Umberto Giordano)
  - Magda Sorel, The Consul (Gian Carlo Menotti)
  - Marie, Wozzeck (Alban Berg)
  - Marie/Marietta, Die tote Stadt (Erich Wolfgang Korngold)
  - Suor Angelica, Suor Angelica (Giacomo Puccini)
  - Eva, Die Meistersinger von Nürnberg (Richard Wagner)
  - Liza, The Queen of Spades (Pyotr Ilyich Tchaikovsky)
  - Marschallin, Der Rosenkavalier (Richard Strauss)
  - Desdemona, Otello (Giuseppe Verdi)
  - Giulietta, Les contes d'Hoffman (Jacques Offenbach)
  - Salome, Salome (Richard Strauss)

=== Dramatischer Sopran ===

- English equivalent: full dramatic soprano
- Range: From about the A below middle C (A_{3}) to the C two octaves above middle C (C_{6})
- Description: Characterized by their rich, full sounding voices, dramatic sopranos are expected to project across large orchestras, a feat that requires a powerful sound. Dramatic sopranos are not expected to have the vocal flexibility of the lighter Fächer. Although most dramatic sopranos have a darker, more robust quality to the voice, there are some that possess a lighter lyrical tone. In these instances, however, the substantial amount of volume and endurance normally associated with the dramatic soprano voice is still present. The darker voiced dramatic soprano may even make a foray into the dramatic mezzo-soprano territory with great success.
- Roles:
  - Ariadne, Ariadne auf Naxos (Richard Strauss)
  - Cassandre, Les Troyens (Hector Berlioz)
  - La Gioconda, La Gioconda (Amilcare Ponchielli)
  - Leonore, Fidelio (Ludwig van Beethoven)
  - Minnie, La fanciulla del West (Giacomo Puccini)
  - Santuzza, Cavalleria rusticana (Pietro Mascagni)
  - Sieglinde, Die Walküre (Wagner)
  - Tosca, Tosca (Giacomo Puccini)

=== Hochdramatischer Sopran ===

- English equivalent: High dramatic soprano
- Range: From about the F below middle C (F_{3}) to the C two octaves above middle C (C_{6})
- Description: A voice capable of answering the demands of operas of Wagner's maturity. The voice is substantial, very powerful, and even throughout the registers. It is immense, stentorian and even larger than the voice of the "normal" dramatic soprano. Although the two voices are comparable and are sometimes hard to distinguish between, this voice has even greater stamina, endurance and volume than the former. The top register is very strong, clarion and bright. Successful hochdramatische are rare.
- Roles:
  - Isolde, Tristan und Isolde (Richard Wagner)
  - Brünnhilde, Der Ring des Nibelungen (Richard Wagner)
  - Turandot, Turandot (Giacomo Puccini)
  - Senta, Der fliegende Holländer (Richard Wagner)
  - Elektra, Elektra (Richard Strauss)

== Mezzo-soprano Fächer ==
=== Koloratur-Mezzosopran ===

- English equivalent: coloratura mezzo-soprano
- Range: From about the G below middle C (G_{3}) to the B two octaves above middle C (B_{5})
- Description: Found especially in Rossini's operas, these roles were written originally for altos with agility and secure top notes. Today they are often played by mezzo-sopranos and sometimes even by sopranos. At times a lyric or full lyric soprano with a flexible voice will assume the roles as written while a true coloratura soprano will sing the same music transposed to a higher key.
- Roles:
  - Angelina, La Cenerentola (Gioachino Rossini)
  - Griselda, Griselda (Vivaldi)
  - Isabella, L'italiana in Algeri (Gioachino Rossini)
  - Isolier, Le comte Ory (Rossini)
  - Julius Caesar, Giulio Cesare (Handel)
  - Orsini, Lucrezia Borgia (Donizetti)
  - Romeo, I Capuleti e i Montecchi (Vincenzo Bellini)
  - Ruggiero, Alcina (Handel)
  - Rosina, Il barbiere di Siviglia (Gioachino Rossini)
  - Tancredi, Tancredi (Gioacchino Rossini)

=== Lyrischer Mezzosopran / Spielalt ===

- Range: From about the G below middle C (G_{3}) to the B two octaves above middle C (B_{5})
- English equivalent: lyric mezzo-soprano
- Description: A lyric soprano's instrument in a lower range; the resulting sound is less piercing, more lachrymose and rather sensitive. The voices are similar, giving rise to the term 'short soprano' i.e. a soprano without the highest notes. In fact, many lyric mezzos with strong extensions to their upper vocal registers make the transition to singing as sopranos at some point in their careers.
- Roles:
  - Charlotte, Werther (Massenet)
  - Cherubino, Le nozze di Figaro (Wolfgang Amadeus Mozart)
  - Dorabella, Così fan tutte (Wolfgang Amadeus Mozart)
  - Hänsel, Hänsel und Gretel (Engelbert Humperdinck)
  - Marguerite, La damnation de Faust (Berlioz)
  - Meg, Little Women (Mark Adamo)
  - Mignon, Mignon (Ambroise Thomas)
  - Nicklausse, Les contes d'Hoffman (Offenbach)
  - Mother, Amahl and the Night Visitors (Menotti)
  - Suzuki, Madama Butterfly (Giacomo Puccini)

=== Dramatischer Mezzosopran ===

- English equivalent: dramatic mezzo-soprano
- Range: From about the G below middle C (G_{3}) to the B two octaves above middle C (B_{5})
- Description: Dramatic mezzo-sopranos have ranges very similar to a dramatic soprano. The main difference is the endurance and ease in which the two voice-types sing – a mezzo will concentrate singing most of the time in her middle and low registers and will go up to notes like high B-flat only at the dramatic climax. Consequently, many dramatic mezzo-sopranos have success in singing some dramatic soprano roles that are written with a lower tessitura.
- Roles:
  - Amneris, Aida (Giuseppe Verdi)
  - Carmen, Carmen (Bizet)
  - Dido, Les Troyens (Hector Berlioz)
  - The Composer, Ariadne auf Naxos (Richard Strauss)
  - Dalila, Samson et Dalila (Camille Saint-Saëns)
  - Eboli, Don Carlo (Giuseppe Verdi)
  - Fricka, Das Rheingold, Die Walküre (Richard Wagner)
  - Gertrud, Hänsel und Gretel (Engelbert Humperdinck)
  - Klytaemnestra, Elektra (Richard Strauss)
  - Octavian, Der Rosenkavalier (Richard Strauss)
  - Ortrud, Lohengrin (Richard Wagner)

== Alto Fächer ==
200pxl

=== Dramatischer Alt ===
- English equivalent: dramatic contralto
- Range: From about the F below middle C (F_{3}) to the A two octaves above (A_{5})
- Description: Stylistically similar to the dramatic mezzo, just lower. Sings usually around the break between the chest voice and middle voice. Many mezzos tried their luck in these roles, yet real altos fare better. A deep, penetrating low female voice. This is a very rare voice type with a darker, richer sound than that of a typical alto.
- Roles:
  - Azucena, Il trovatore (Verdi)
  - La Cieca, La Gioconda (Ponchielli)
  - Dryade, Ariadne auf Naxos (Richard Strauss)
  - Erda, Das Rheingold, Siegfried (Wagner)
  - Maddalena, Rigoletto (Verdi)
  - A norn, Götterdämmerung (Wagner)
  - Polina, The Queen of Spades (Tchaikovsky)
  - Schwertleite, Die Walküre (Wagner)
  - Ulrica, Un ballo in maschera (Verdi)

=== Tiefer Alt ===
- English equivalent: deep contralto
- Range: From about low C (C_{3}) to the E two octaves above (E_{5})
- Description: A low female voice.
- Roles:
  - Anna, Les Troyens (Hector Berlioz)
  - Annina, Der Rosenkavalier (Richard Strauss)
  - Antonia's mother, Tales of Hoffmann (Jacques Offenbach)
  - Bradamante, Alcina (Handel)
  - Didone, Egisto (Cavalli)
  - Gaea, Daphne (Richard Strauss)
  - Geneviève, Pelléas et Mélisande (Claude Debussy)
  - Hippolyta, A Midsummer Night's Dream (Britten)
  - Marthe, Faust (Charles Gounod)
  - Zita, Gianni Schicchi (Giacomo Puccini)

== Tenor Fächer ==
=== Lyrischer Tenor ===

- English equivalent: lyric tenor
- Range: From about low C (C_{3}) to the C an octave above middle C (C_{5})
- Roles:
  - Alfredo, La traviata (Giuseppe Verdi)
  - Almaviva, Il barbiere di Siviglia (Gioachino Rossini)
  - Belmonte, Die Entführung aus dem Serail (Wolfgang Amadeus Mozart)
  - Don Ottavio, Don Giovanni (Wolfgang Amadeus Mozart)
  - Il Duca, Rigoletto (Giuseppe Verdi)
  - Lindoro, L'italiana in Algeri (Gioachino Rossini)
  - Nemorino, L'elisir d'amore (Gaetano Donizetti)
  - Ramiro, La Cenerentola (Gioachino Rossini)
  - Tamino, Die Zauberflöte (Wolfgang Amadeus Mozart)

=== Jugendlicher Heldentenor ===

- English equivalent: lyric dramatic tenor also known as Spinto
- Range: From about low C (C_{3}) to the C an octave above middle C (C_{5})
- Description: A tenor with a dramatic extended upper range with the necessary brightness to come through the orchestra's texture.
- Roles:
  - Calaf, Turandot (Giacomo Puccini)
  - Canio, Pagliacci (Ruggero Leoncavallo)
  - Cavaradossi, Tosca (Giacomo Puccini)
  - Dick Johnson, La fanciulla del West (Giacomo Puccini)
  - Don Alvaro, La forza del destino (Giuseppe Verdi)
  - Don José, Carmen (Georges Bizet)
  - Florestan, Fidelio (Ludwig van Beethoven)
  - Idomeneo, Idomeneo (Wolfgang Amadeus Mozart)
  - Lohengrin, Lohengrin (Richard Wagner)
  - Manrico, Il trovatore (Giuseppe Verdi)
  - Max, Der Freischütz (Carl Maria von Weber)
  - Radamès, Aida (Giuseppe Verdi)
  - Siegmund, Die Walküre (Richard Wagner)

=== Charaktertenor ===

- English equivalent: character tenor; must have good acting abilities.
- Range: From about the B below low C (B_{2}) to the C an octave above middle C (C_{5})
- Roles
  - Monostatos, Die Zauberflöte (Wolfgang Amadeus Mozart)

=== Heldentenor ===

- English equivalent: heroic tenor or dramatic tenor
- Range: From about the B below low C (B_{2}) to the C above middle C (C_{5})
- Description: A full dramatic tenor with baritonal facility in the middle range and the brightness necessary to pierce a thick orchestral texture.
- Roles:
  - Otello, Otello (Giuseppe Verdi)
  - Siegfried, Der Ring des Nibelungen (Richard Wagner)
  - Tristan, Tristan und Isolde (Richard Wagner)
  - Tannhäuser, Tannhäuser (Richard Wagner)
  - Walther von Stolzing, Die Meistersinger (Richard Wagner)

=== Spieltenor / Tenor buffo ===

- English equivalent: (lyric) comic tenor
- It is quite possible for a young Spieltenor to eventually work into the lighter lyrischer Tenor category; the deciding factor will be the beauty of voice.
- Range: From about the B below low C (B_{2}) to the B an octave above middle C (B_{4})
- Roles:
  - Pedrillo, Die Entführung aus dem Serail (Wolfgang Amadeus Mozart)
  - Mime, Das Rheingold, Siegfried (Richard Wagner)

== Baritone Fächer ==
=== Bariton / Baryton-Martin ===
- Italian: baritono leggero
- French: Baryton-Martin
- English equivalent: light baritone
- Range: From the B below low C (B_{2}) to the B above middle C (B_{4})
- Description: The Baryton-Martin, named after Jean-Blaise Martin (sometimes referred to as Light Baritone) lacks the lower G_{2}–A_{2} range a heavier baritone is capable of, and has a lighter, almost tenor-like quality.
- Roles:
  - Gabriel von Eisenstein, Die Fledermaus (J. Strauss II)

=== Lyrischer Bariton / Spielbariton ===
- Italian: baritono lirico
- English equivalent: lyric baritone
- Range: From about the A below low C (A_{2}) to the A above middle C (A_{4})
- Description: A sweet, mild sounding baritone voice, lacking harshness. Many lyric baritone roles call for some fioritura and coloratura, a beautiful line, as well as a charismatic presence.
- Roles:
  - Albert, Werther (Jules Massenet)
  - Belcore, L'elisir d'amore (Gaetano Donizetti)
  - Billy Budd, Billy Budd (Benjamin Britten)
  - Dottore Malatesta, Don Pasquale (Gaetano Donizetti)
  - Figaro, Il barbiere di Siviglia (Gioachino Rossini)
  - Guglielmo, Così fan tutte (Wolfgang Amadeus Mozart)
  - Papageno, Die Zauberflöte (Wolfgang Amadeus Mozart)

=== Kavalierbariton ===

- Italian: baritono cantabile
- English equivalent: cavalier baritone
- Range: From about the A below low C (A_{2}) to the G♯ above middle C (G♯_{4})
- Description: A metallic voice, that can sing both lyric and dramatic phrases, a manly noble baritonal color; most on-stage roles in this Fach call for good looks. Not quite as vocally powerful as the Verdi baritone or Charakterbariton, who is expected to have a powerful, perhaps muscular or physically large, appearance on stage and has a harsher, more pronounced than the lyric baritone or Spielbariton.
- Roles:
  - Conte Almaviva, Le nozze di Figaro (Wolfgang Amadeus Mozart)
  - Count, Capriccio (Richard Strauss)
  - Don Giovanni, Don Giovanni (Wolfgang Amadeus Mozart)
  - Escamillo, Carmen (Georges Bizet)
  - Ford, Falstaff (Giuseppe Verdi)
  - Lescaut, Manon Lescaut (Giacomo Puccini)
  - Lord Enrico Ashton, Lucia di Lammermoor (Gaetano Donizetti)
  - Marcello, La bohème (Giacomo Puccini)
  - Onegin, Eugene Onegin (Pyotr Ilyich Tchaikovsky)
  - Rodrigo de Posa, Don Carlo (Giuseppe Verdi)
  - Sharpless, Madama Butterfly (Giacomo Puccini)
  - Valentin, Faust (Charles Gounod)
  - Wolfram von Eschenbach, Tannhäuser (Richard Wagner)

=== Charakterbariton ===

- Italian: baritono verdiano
- English equivalent: Verdi baritone
- Range: From about the A below low C (A_{2}) to the G♯ above middle C (G♯_{4})
- Description: A voice particularly effective with passages in its higher reaches. A high tessitura vis-a-vis the range extremes. A Verdi baritone refers to a voice capable of singing consistently and with ease in the highest part of the baritone range, sometimes extending up to the C above middle C (C_{5} or high C). The Verdi baritone will generally have a lot of squillo, or "ping"
- Roles:
  - Rigoletto (title role) (Giuseppe Verdi)
  - Scarpia, Tosca (Giacomo Puccini)
  - Wozzeck (title role) (Alban Berg)

=== Heldenbariton ===

- Italian: baritono drammatico
- English equivalent: dramatic baritone
- Range: From about the G below low C (G_{2}) to the F♯ above middle C (F♯_{4})
- Description: Means 'heroic baritone'. In the German opera houses a true Heldenbariton is a prized possession: a singer with exciting power and an authoritative mature sound and production.
- Roles:
  - Alfio, Cavalleria rusticana (Pietro Mascagni)
  - Amonasro, Aida (Giuseppe Verdi)
  - Dr Schön / Jack the Ripper, Lulu (Alban Berg)
  - Ezio, Attila (Giuseppe Verdi)
  - Gérard, Andrea Chénier (Umberto Giordano)
  - Iago, Otello (Giuseppe Verdi)
  - Jack Rance, La fanciulla del West (Giacomo Puccini)
  - Jochanaan, Salome (Richard Strauss)
  - Macbeth (title role) (Giuseppe Verdi)
  - Michele, Il tabarro (Giacomo Puccini)
  - Don Pizarro, Fidelio (Ludwig van Beethoven)
  - Simon Boccanegra (title role) (Giuseppe Verdi)
  - Telramund, Lohengrin (Richard Wagner)
  - Tonio, Pagliacci (Ruggero Leoncavallo)

=== Lyrischer Bassbariton / Low lyric baritone ===

- English equivalent: lyric bass-baritone
- Range: From about the F below low C (F_{2}) to the F♯ above middle C (F♯_{4})
- Description: The bass-baritone's required range can vary tremendously based on the role, with some less demanding than others. Some bass-baritones are baritones, while others are basses.

== Bass Fächer ==
=== Hoher Bass / Dramatic bass-baritone / High dramatic bass ===

- English equivalent: dramatic bass-baritone
- Range: From about the E below low C (E_{2}) to the F above middle C (F_{4})
- Roles:
  - Wotan, Die Walküre (Wagner)

=== Jugendlicher Bass ===

- English equivalent: young bass
- Range: From about the E below low C (E_{2}) to the F above middle C (F_{4})
- Description: A young man (regardless of the age of the singer).
- Roles:
  - Masetto, Don Giovanni (Wolfgang Amadeus Mozart)
  - Colline, La bohème (Giacomo Puccini)

=== Spielbass / Bassbuffo / Lyric buffo ===

- English equivalent: lyric comic bass
- Range: From the E half an octave below low C (E_{2}) to the F above middle C (F_{4})
- Roles:
  - Don Alfonso, Così fan tutte (Wolfgang Amadeus Mozart)
  - Don Pasquale, Don Pasquale (Gaetano Donizetti)
  - Dottor Dulcamara, L'elisir d'amore (Gaetano Donizetti)
  - Dottor Bartolo, Il barbiere di Siviglia (Gioachino Rossini)
  - Don Magnifico, La Cenerentola (Gioachino Rossini)
  - Leporello, Don Giovanni (Wolfgang Amadeus Mozart)
  - The Sacristan, Tosca (Giacomo Puccini)

=== Schwerer Spielbass / Dramatic buffo ===

- English equivalent: dramatic comic bass
- Range: From about the C two octaves below middle C (C_{2}) to the F above middle C (F_{4})
- Roles:
  - Baron Ochs auf Lerchenau, Der Rosenkavalier (Richard Strauss)
  - Daland, Der fliegende Holländer (Richard Wagner)
  - Méphistophélès, Faust (Charles Gounod)

=== Lyrischer seriöser Bass ===

- English equivalent: low bass. Italian: basso profondo.
- Range: From about the C two octaves below middle C (C_{2}) to the F above middle C (F_{4})
- Basso profondo is the lowest bass voice type. According to J. B. Steane in Voices, Singers, and Critics, the basso profondo voice "derives from a method of tone-production that eliminates the more Italian quick vibrato. In its place is a kind of tonal solidity, a wall-like front, which may nevertheless prove susceptible to the other kind of vibrato, the slow beat or dreaded wobble."
- Roles:
  - Don Bartolo, Le nozze di Figaro (Wolfgang Amadeus Mozart)
  - Fiesco, Simon Boccanegra (Giuseppe Verdi)
  - Padre Guardiano, La forza del destino (Giuseppe Verdi)
  - Pimen, Boris Godunov (Modest Mussorgsky)
  - Rocco, Fidelio (Ludwig van Beethoven)
  - Sarastro, Die Zauberflöte (Wolfgang Amadeus Mozart)
  - Sir Morosus, Die schweigsame Frau (Richard Strauss)
  - Sparafucile, Rigoletto (Giuseppe Verdi)

=== Dramatischer seriöser Bass ===

- English equivalent: dramatic low bass. Dramatic basso profundo is a powerful basso profundo voice.
- Range: From about the C (C_{2}) to the F above middle C (F_{4})
- Roles:
  - Il Commendatore, Don Giovanni (Wolfgang Amadeus Mozart)
  - Fafner, Das Rheingold, Siegfried (Richard Wagner)
  - The Grand Inquisitor, Don Carlos (Giuseppe Verdi)
  - Gurnemanz, Titurel, Parsifal (Richard Wagner)
  - Heinrich, Lohengrin (Richard Wagner)
  - Marke, Tristan und Isolde (Richard Wagner)

== Bibliography ==
- Kloiber, Rudolf; Konold, Wulf; Maschka, Robert (2002). Handbuch der Oper (9th ed.). Kassel: Bärenreiter. ISBN 978-3-7618-1605-9.
- McGinnis, Pearl Yeadon (2010). Willis, Marith McGinnis (ed.). The opera singer's career guide: understanding the European Fach system. Scarecrow Press. ISBN 978-0-8108-6915-8.
- Midgette, Anne (2007-05-06). "Home in the Range? Who Can Sing What". The New York Times.
- Steane, J. B. (1992). "Fach". In Sadie, Stanley (ed.). The New Grove Dictionary of Opera. London: Macmillan Reference. ISBN 978-0-333-73432-2.
