= List of crossings of the Atlantic Ocean =

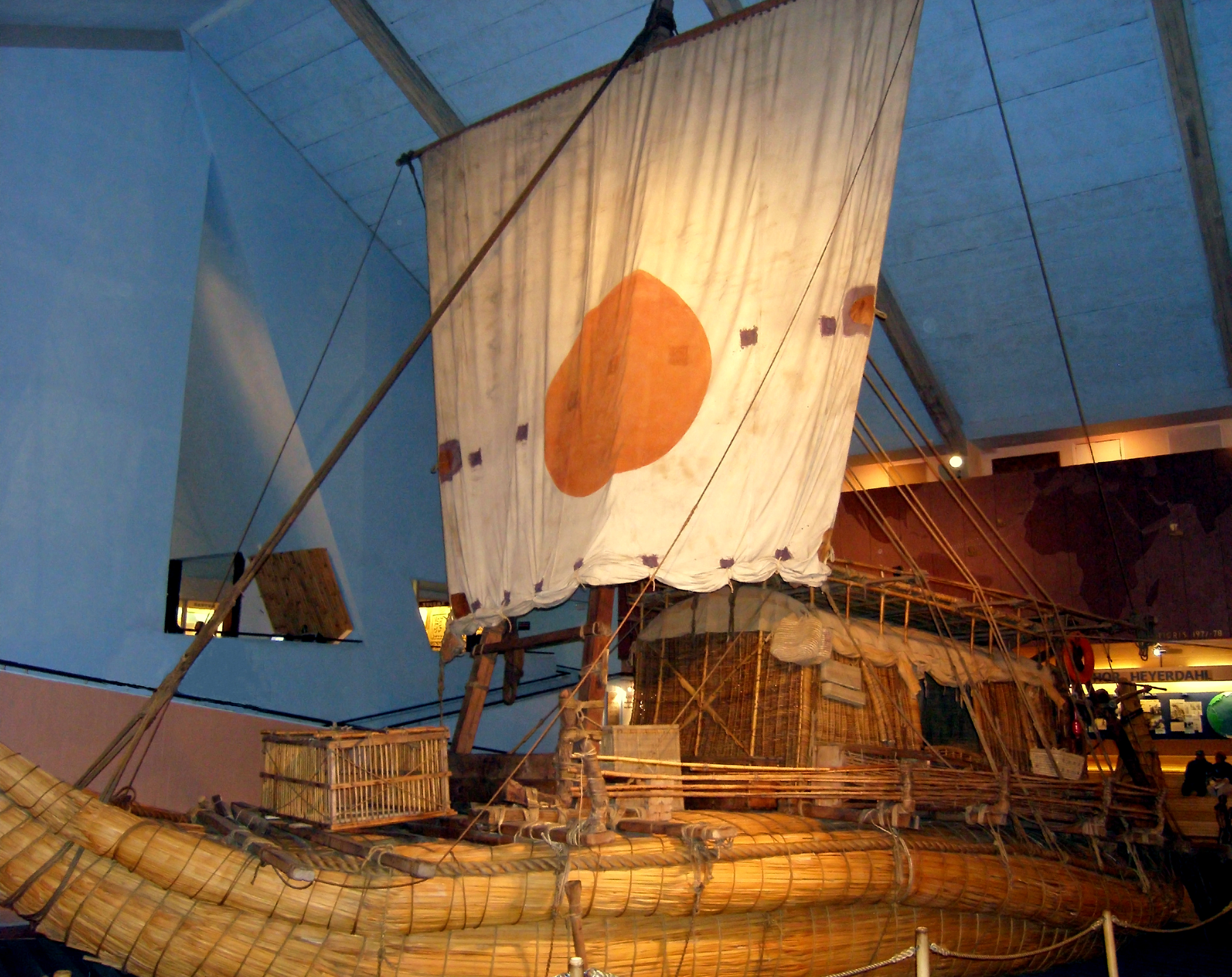
Ra II, a ship built from papyrus, was successfully sailed across the Atlantic by Thor Heyerdahl proving that it was possible to cross the Atlantic from Africa using such boats in early epochs of history.

Transatlantic crossings are passages of passengers and cargo across the Atlantic Ocean between the Americas, the Caribbean, or other nearby islands; and Europe, Iceland, Africa, or nearby islands. Only notable crossings or attempted crossings are listed here.

== Sail and human-powered voyages ==
=== Pre-1492 ===
Maritime explorations by Norse peoples from Scandinavia during the late 10th century led to the Norse colonization of Greenland and a base camp L'Anse aux Meadows in Newfoundland, which preceded Columbus's arrival in the Americas by about 500 years. According to the Vinland sagas, this includes journeys by:

- Unnamed Norse explorers to Greenland
- Erik the Red to Greenland
- Bjarni Herjólfsson to Newfoundland, Labrador, and Baffin Island
- Leif Erikson to Newfoundland (Vinland)
- Spouses Thorfinn Karlsefni and Gudrid Thorbjarnardóttir led an expedition to Vinland where they begat their son Snorri Thorfinnsson, the first European born in the Americas outside of Greenland.

Other pre-Columbian transoceanic contact theories involving transatlantic travel have not been supported by enough evidence to be widely accepted, such as the travels of Prince Madoc of Gwynedd, Wales in 1170.

=== 15th to 16th centuries ===
- Voyages of Christopher Columbus: 1492-1493, 1493-1496, 1498-1500, and 1502-1504. Departing from various ports in Spain, Columbus led exploration and attempted conquest of the Caribbean coast from Honduras to Venezuela and numerous Caribbean islands. Word of these voyages led to widespread European exploration and colonization of the Americas, and a period of Columbian Exchange that permanently altered human cultures and the environment on both sides of the Atlantic.
- Bartholomew Columbus traveled from Spain to the Antilles in 1494 and 1509, in addition to occasionally accompanying his brother Christopher and nephew Diego.
- From 1496 to 1498 John Cabot made two or three voyages to North America from Bristol, landing in Newfoundland, or possibly the Canadian Maritimes. He sailed from England in service of King Henry VII, surveying what he believed to be the coast of Asia.
- In 1498, João Fernandes Lavrador discovered the North American land named after him.
- In 1500, Pedro Álvares Cabral reached Brazil, the first European to do so.
- Gonçalo Coelho mapped Brazil in 1501–02 and 1503–04 voyages
- Sebastian Cabot returned to England from a 1504 expedition with North American fish. In 1508–09, his second expedition searched for the Northwest Passage around North America to the Pacific.
- In 1519 Ferdinand Magellan sailed from Spain to the South Atlantic, navigating the straits named after him and entering the Pacific Ocean.
- In 1524, Florentine explorer Giovanni da Verrazzano, in the service of the King Francis I of France, explored the Atlantic coast of North America from Florida to New Brunswick.
- In 1534, Jacques Cartier entered the Gulf of St. Lawrence and reached the mouth of the St. Lawrence River.
- In 1560, the Portuguese carrack São Paulo, captained by Ruy de Mello da Camera, sailed from Recife (Brazil) around the Cape of Good Hope to Sumatra, in whose South coast she was wrecked; actually crossing both the Atlantic and Indian oceans in one non-stop sailing.
- In April 1563, Nicolas Barre and 20 other stranded Huguenots were the first to build a (crude) boat in the Americas and sail across the Atlantic. They sailed from Charlesfort, South Carolina to just off the coast of England where they were rescued by an English ship. Though they resorted to cannibalism, seven men survived the voyage, including Barre.
- In 1566, the first trade route across the Atlantic was inaugurated by Spain with the establishment of the West Indies fleets, a convoy system which regularly linked its territories in the Americas with Spain for over two centuries.
- English soldier and courtier Sir Humphrey Gilbert sailed across the Atlantic in 1583, landing in what is now St. John's, Canada and claiming the land for England. His ship sank somewhere off the Azores during the return voyage and he drowned.
- The first group attempting to found Roanoke Colony crossed in 1585, led by Ralph Lane. The second group crossed in 1587, led by John White. The 1590 resupply crossing found the colony mysteriously abandoned.

=== 17th to 18th centuries ===
- In 1609, the Mary and John, captained by Samuel Argall, crossed the Atlantic in less than ten weeks (about 70 days), a new record.
- In 1619, the Treasurer, captained by Samuel Argall, crossed the Atlantic in 57 days.
- On 16 September 1620 (New Style), the sailing ship Mayflower, carrying English and Dutch Pilgrims on board, set sail from England to North America, reaching New England on 21 November (New Style) the same year, founding the Plymouth Colony.
- Over the summer of 1630, the Winthrop Fleet carried hundreds of Puritans from England to found the Massachusetts Bay Colony.
- In November 1732 the ship Ann crossed the Atlantic, from London to Georgia, carrying British soldier, Member of Parliament, and philanthropist James Oglethorpe. The journey took 88 days, arriving in Savannah in February 1733. Oglethorpe would found the colony of Georgia, of which he was the governor.
- In 1764, William Harrison (the son of John Harrison) sailed aboard HMS Tartar, with the H-4 time piece. The voyage became the basis for the invention of the global system of longitude.

=== 19th century ===
- In 1870, the small City of Ragusa of Liverpool became the first small lifeboat to cross the Atlantic from Queenstown, County Cork to Boston with two crew, John Charles Buckley and Nikola Primorac (di Costa).
- In 1896, Frank Samuelsen and George Harbo from Norway became the first people known to ever row across the Atlantic Ocean.

=== 20th century ===
- In 1952, Ann Davison was the first woman to single-handedly sail the Atlantic Ocean.
- In 1956, the sail-equipped raft L'Égaré II crossed from Newfoundland to England, after the failure of L'Égaré I.
- In 1965, Robert Manry crossed the Atlantic from the U.S. to England non-stop in a 4.1-metre (13-foot) sailboat named Tinkerbelle. Several others also crossed the Atlantic in very small sailboats in the 1960s, none of them non-stop, though.
- In 1969 and 1970 Thor Heyerdahl launched expeditions to cross the Atlantic in boats built from papyrus. He succeeded in crossing the Atlantic from Morocco to Barbados after a two-month voyage of 6,100 km (3,800 mi) with Ra II in 1970, thus conclusively proving that boats such as the Ra could have sailed with the Canary Current across the Atlantic in prehistoric times.
- In 1980, Gérard d'Aboville was the first man to cross the Atlantic Ocean rowing solo.
- In 1984, Amyr Klink crossed the South Atlantic rowing solo from Namibia to Brazil in 100 days.
- In 1984, five Argentines sail in a 10-metre-long (33 ft) raft made from tree trunks named Atlantis from Canary Islands and after 52 days 4,800 kilometres (3,000 mi) journey arrived to Venezuela in an attempt to prove travellers from Africa may have crossed the Atlantic before Christopher Columbus.
- In 1985, American boatbuilder, Al Grovers, Sr., made the first outboard crossing of the Atlantic.
- In 1994, Guy Delage was the first man to allegedly swim across the Atlantic Ocean (with the help of a kick board, from Cape Verde to Barbados). Controversy followed because of lack of supervision and the time spent drifting on a support vessel.
- In 1997-98, the Floating Neutrinos sailed a vessel made from recycled materials across the North Atlantic from Maine to Ireland by way of Nova Scotia & Newfoundland.
- In 1998, Benoît Lecomte was the first man to swim across the northern Atlantic Ocean without a kick board, stopping for only one week in the Azores. The accomplishment was questioned due to the time spent drifting on a support vehicle.
- In 1999, after rowing for 81 days and 4,767 kilometres (2,962 miles), Tori Murden became the first woman to cross the Atlantic Ocean by rowboat alone when she reached Guadeloupe from the Canary Islands.

=== 21st century ===
- In August 2019, the Swedish climate activist Greta Thunberg, her father and three crew members made a crossing of the Atlantic from Plymouth to New York in 15 days on board the Malizia II. The voyage generated all of its power during the crossing using solar power and an under-water turbine.

== Powered sea vessels ==
- In 1819, SS Savannah became the first steamship to cross the Atlantic Ocean.
- In 1858, Cyrus West Field laid the first transatlantic telegraph cable from Ireland to Newfoundland (it quickly failed).
- In 1865, Isambard Kingdom Brunel's ship the SS Great Eastern laid the first successful transatlantic telegraph cable.
- On 15 April 1912, the RMS Titanic sank after hitting an iceberg with a loss of more than 1,500 lives.
- On 7 May 1915, the RMS Lusitania was torpedoed en route to Queenstown, Ireland, with a loss of 1,193 people.
- 1914–1918, during the Atlantic U-boat campaign of World War I, more than 2,100 ships were sunk and 153 U-boats destroyed.
- 1939–1945, during World War II, when transatlantic shipping became vital to UK wartime success, the Battle of the Atlantic resulted in nearly 3,700 ships sunk and 783 U-boats destroyed.
- In 2003, Alan Priddy and three crew members made a record crossing of the North Atlantic in a rigid inflatable boat (RIB) from Newfoundland to Scotland, via Greenland and Iceland, in 103 hours.

== Aircraft ==
- In 1919, the American NC-4 became the first seaplane to cross the Atlantic (though it made a couple of landings on islands and the sea along the way, and taxied several hundred kilometers).
- Later in 1919, a British aeroplane piloted by Alcock and Brown made the first non-stop transatlantic flight, from Newfoundland to Ireland.
- Later still in 1919, the British were the first to cross the North Atlantic in an airship with the R34, starting at RAF East Fortune in Scotland and landing in Mineola, New York.
- In 1922, Portuguese aviators Sacadura Cabral and Gago Coutinho were the First aerial crossing of the South Atlantic on a seaplane connecting Lisbon to Rio de Janeiro.
- In May 1927, Charles Nungesser and François Coli in their aircraft L'Oiseau Blanc (The White Bird) mysteriously disappeared in an attempt to make the first non-stop transatlantic flight from Paris to New York.
- In 1927, Charles Lindbergh made the first solo non-stop transatlantic flight in an aircraft (between New York City and Paris).
- In 1931, Bert Hinkler made the first solo non-stop transatlantic flight across the South Atlantic in an aircraft.
- In 1932, Amelia Earhart became the first female to make a solo flight across the Atlantic from Harbour Grace, Newfoundland to Derry, Northern Ireland.
- In 2019, Aarohi Pandit became the first woman pilot to fly solo across the Atlantic Ocean in a light-sport aircraft, Pipistrel Sinus 912.

== See also ==
- Portuguese India Armadas (with occasional stops in Brazil)
- History of Antarctica (Southern Ocean crossings)
- List of explorers
