= Spinto =

Soprano or tenor operatic voice weight between lyric and dramatic

Spinto (Italian for "pushed") is a vocal term used to characterize a soprano or tenor voice of a weight between lyric and dramatic that is capable of handling large musical climaxes in opera at moderate intervals. (Sometimes the terms lirico-spinto or jugendlich-dramatisch are used to denote this category of voice.)

The spinto voice type is recognisable by its tonal "slice" or squillo. This enables the singer to cut through the wall of sound produced by a full Romantic orchestra in a wide variety of roles, excluding only the most taxing ones written by the likes of Richard Wagner (such as Brünhilde, Isolde, Tristan and Siegfried), Giacomo Meyerbeer (John of Leyden), Verdi (Otello), Puccini (Turandot, Calaf) and Richard Strauss (Elektra).

- Spinto soprano: A fundamentally lyric soprano with a fair amount of extra "pulp" in her tone and a distinct thrust in her vocal attack. As they possess both a lyric and a dramatic quality, spinto sopranos are suitable for a broad spectrum of roles, ranging from genuine lyric parts such as Micaela in Carmen and Mimì in La bohème through to histrionically demanding Verdi heroines such as Leonora (in Il trovatore and La forza del destino) and Aida, not to mention Puccini's Madama Butterfly and Tosca. Lighter Wagnerian roles such as Elsa in Lohengrin or Elisabeth in Tannhäuser also fall within their domain. Elisabeth Rethberg is a famous example of a soprano who sang exactly this kind of mixed Italian and German repertoire.
- Tenore spinto: The tenor equivalent of the above. He can convincingly sing roles as lyrical as Rodolfo in La bohème, the Duke in Rigoletto and Alfredo in La traviata, yet still excel in parts as heavy as Cavaradossi in Tosca, Don Jose in Carmen and Radames in Aïda. Canio, in Pagliacci, and Lohengrin are other well-known examples of spinto tenor roles.

== See also ==
- Fach
