= Lirico =

Lyrico (Italian "lyric") can designate the following voice parts:

- Soprano lirico (lyric soprano)
- Lirico spinto (spinto soprano)
- Tenore lirico (lyric tenor)
