= Margherita Roberti =

American operatic soprano (1925–2021)

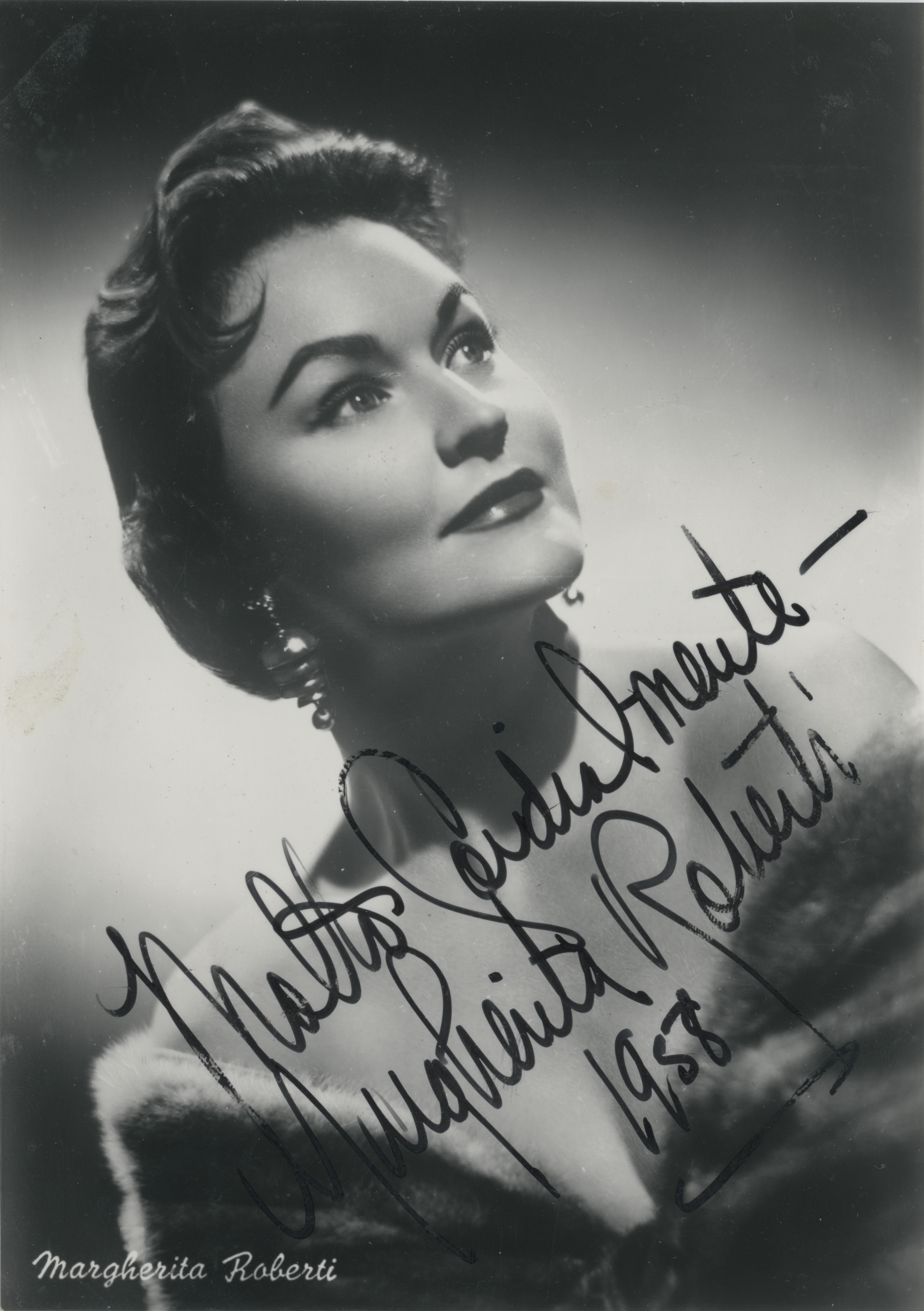
- Margherita Roberti (photo with 1958 dedication)
- Born: Margaret Jean Roberts
- Occupation: opera soprano singer
- Years active: 1948-1988

Margherita Roberti, born Margaret Jean Roberts (1925 – January 23, 2021) was an American operatic soprano who had an active international career that spanned from 1948 to 1988. Although she performed throughout the world, Roberti achieved her greatest success and popularity in Italy. A dramatic soprano, Roberti drew particular acclaim for her portrayals of Verdi heroines. Among her signature roles are Amelia in Un ballo in maschera, Elisabetta in Don Carlos, Elena in I vespri siciliani, Odabella in Attila, and the title role in Luisa Miller. In 1970 she was awarded of the Order of Merit of the Italian Republic.

== Biography ==
Margaret Jean Roberts was born to F.J. and Ethel Roberts in Wayne County, Iowa. Her father was a breeder of Angus cattle and she grew up on his farm in Atlantic, Iowa. Her family sold the farm when she was 12 and moved to Muscatine, Iowa. The following year Roberti began taking voice lessons with Herald Stark at the University of Iowa. In 1943 she graduated from Muscatine High School after which she studied voice at Hunter College. While at Hunter she met her husband Thomas Nobis, an engineer recently returning from duty in the United States Navy. The couple married in 1949 and in 1952 their daughter, athlete Jennifer Figge, was born.

In 1948 Roberti made her professional opera debut with the Saint Louis Opera. That same year (1948) she was also a soloist with the Naumburg Orchestral Concerts, in the Naumburg Bandshell, Central Park, in the summer series. In 1951, she began performing regularly on the Chicago radio program Chicago Theater of the Air. She would commute weekly from her home in Davenport, Iowa to the Windy City for performances.

Roberti was advised to establish herself as an opera singer in Europe if she wanted to have a major opera career in the United States. So in 1956, she moved to Italy and began a rigorous course of study in opera with Antonio Narducci among other teachers. She made her European debut the following year at the Teatro Alfieri in Turin as Leonore in Giuseppe Verdi's Il trovatore to a warm reception. It was at this time that she adopted the "italianized" version of her name that she used for the rest of her career.

After her European debut, invitations from major opera houses throughout Europe came pouring in to Roberti. In 1958 she sang Abigaille in Verdi's Nabucco for her La Scala debut. She was a regular performer at that house for the next ten seasons. In 1958 she portrayed the title role in Puccini's Tosca for her first performance at the Royal Opera at Covent Garden. That same year she made her first appearance at the Arena di Verona Festival and made her debut at the Lyric Opera of Chicago as Amelia Grimaldi in Verdi's Simon Boccanegra opposite Tito Gobbi in the title role and Richard Tucker as Gabriele Adorno. Other international appearances included performances in Buenos Aires, New Orleans, San Francisco, Mexico City, and Israel.

Roberti made her debut at the Metropolitan Opera in 1962 as Tosca to the Cavardossi of Franco Corelli. That same year she sang Tosca with Corelli for her debut with the Philadelphia Lyric Opera Company. Roberti also sang the title role in Verdi's Aida in New York and Philadelphia that year. In 1963 she sang the title role in Verdi's Luisa Miller at the Edinburgh Festival. She was also a repeat performer at the Vienna State Opera from 1959 to 1964. She remained busy in opera houses in Italy for the rest of her career.

In 1970, Roberti was awarded with Order of the Merit by the Italian Republic president Giuseppe Saragat for artistic achievement. Her final performance was a farewell concert given in the Quad Cities in 1988.

She died on January 23, 2021, at the age of 95.

== Recordings ==
Year	Title	Role	Cast	Conductor Orchestra	Live / Studio	Label
1959	Verdi: I vespri siciliani	Duchessa Elena d'Austria	Pier Miranda Ferraro, Aldo Protti, Plinio Clabassi, Margherita Roberti, et al.	Antonino Votto; Teatro Verdi di Trieste Chorus and Orchestra	Live	Bongiovanni
1960	Verdi: Don Carlo	Elisabetta di Valois	Boris Christoff, Richard Tucker, Tito Gobbi, Margherita Roberti, Giulietta Simionato, et al.	Antonino Votto; Lyric Opera of Chicago Chorus and Orchestra	Live	Living Stage
	Verdi: Ernani	Elvira	Mario Del Monaco, Ettore Bastianini, Nicola Rossi-Lemeni	Fernando Previtali - Teatro di San Carlo, Napoli	Live	Andromeda.
1962	Verdi: Attila	Odabella	Boris Christoff, Margherita Roberti, Giangiacomo Guelfi, Gastone Limarilli, Mario Frosini, et al.	Bruno Bartoletti; Teatro Comunale di Firenze Chorus and Orchestra	Live	Opera D'Oro
1969	Cilea: Gloria	Gloria	Margherita Roberti, Flaviano Labò, Lorenzo Testi, Ferruccio Mazzoli, Anna Maria Rota, et al.	Ferdinando Previtali; Orchestra Sinfonica di Torino della RAI Radiotelevisione	Live	Bongiovanni
