= Jennifer Figge =

American athlete from Aspen, Colorado

Personal information
- Nationality: American
- Born: November 12, 1952 (age 72); Davenport, Iowa
- Education: University of Denver, 1973

Jennifer Figge (born November 12, 1952) is an American athlete from Aspen, Colorado, who in 2009 attempted to swim several portions of the Atlantic from Africa to South America, starting on January 12, 2009, at the Cape Verde Islands, and ending in North America in Trinidad and Tobago on February 5. Newspaper accounts reported she covered a distance of roughly 2000 miles.

Born in Davenport, Iowa, Figge is the daughter of Margaret Nobis who as an opera singer took the name Margherita Roberti, and was a leader in society circles. Her father Tom Nobis, a board President for the Davenport School System, pushed for the expansion of the Davenport School System in the 1960's and was President of the Symphony board and City Chamber of Commerce.

She attended Davenport Central High School, graduating in 1970, and was a 1973 graduate of the University of Denver.

In early 2009 for 24 days ending on February 5 she swam several sections of the Atlantic Ocean from the Cape Verde Islands off Africa to Chacachacare Island in Trinidad off Venezuela (a total of roughly 2,160 mi (3,480 km)), spending much of the time in a shark cage while swimming up to 8 hours a day, battling strong winds and waves up to 30 feet. Most accounts of her swim put her total distance close to 2000 miles. She had originally planned to swim to the Bahamas, but was blown 1,000 miles (1,600 km) off course.

Figge was a veteran marathon runner, but very knowledgeable about the effects of cold water and had trained extensively for the crossing with long swims, having previously attempted an 83 Km three day haul from Cay Sal Bank, Bahamas, to Marathon, Florida. She swam around nineteen of the twenty-four days she had scheduled to swim, on occasion cancelling a day of swimming due to weather. Lynne Cox, a veteran cold water swimmer felt Figge had an advantage swimming in a shark cage which may have increased her speed as much as 30%, but understood her need to use the cage. Another media source reports she swam 3400 kilometers, or roughly 2112 miles, very close to the distance previously cited. Though the exact distance varied, several media sources put the distance between 1000–2000 miles, with several reporting 2000 miles.

Several major media outlets initially erroneously reported she swam the entire distance across the ocean. The claim was challenged by several sources, as mathematically impossible, as Figge would have had to swim over 90 miles (140 km) a day at about ten miles per hour – a physical impossibility. In an interview with the Associated Press, Figge said she "never intended to swim the Atlantic." On February 9, she reported she planned to continue her swim from Trinidad on to the British Virgin Islands. She ate roughly 8000 calories a day, and her longest swim was 8 hours.

== See also ==
- Guy Delage, who made an unverified claim to have swum across the Atlantic with the help of a kick board
- Benoît Lecomte, the first person to swim stages across the Atlantic without a kick board
- List of female adventurers
