= Helene Jung =

German opera singer (1887–1975)

Helene Jung (14 June 1887, Weimar – 3 October 1975, Gosheim) was a German operatic mezzo-soprano and contralto. She premiered three roles in operas written by Richard Strauss: the omniscient seashell in Die ägyptische Helena, the housekeeper in Die schweigsame Frau, and Gaea in Daphne.
