= Elisabeth Rethberg =

German opera singer

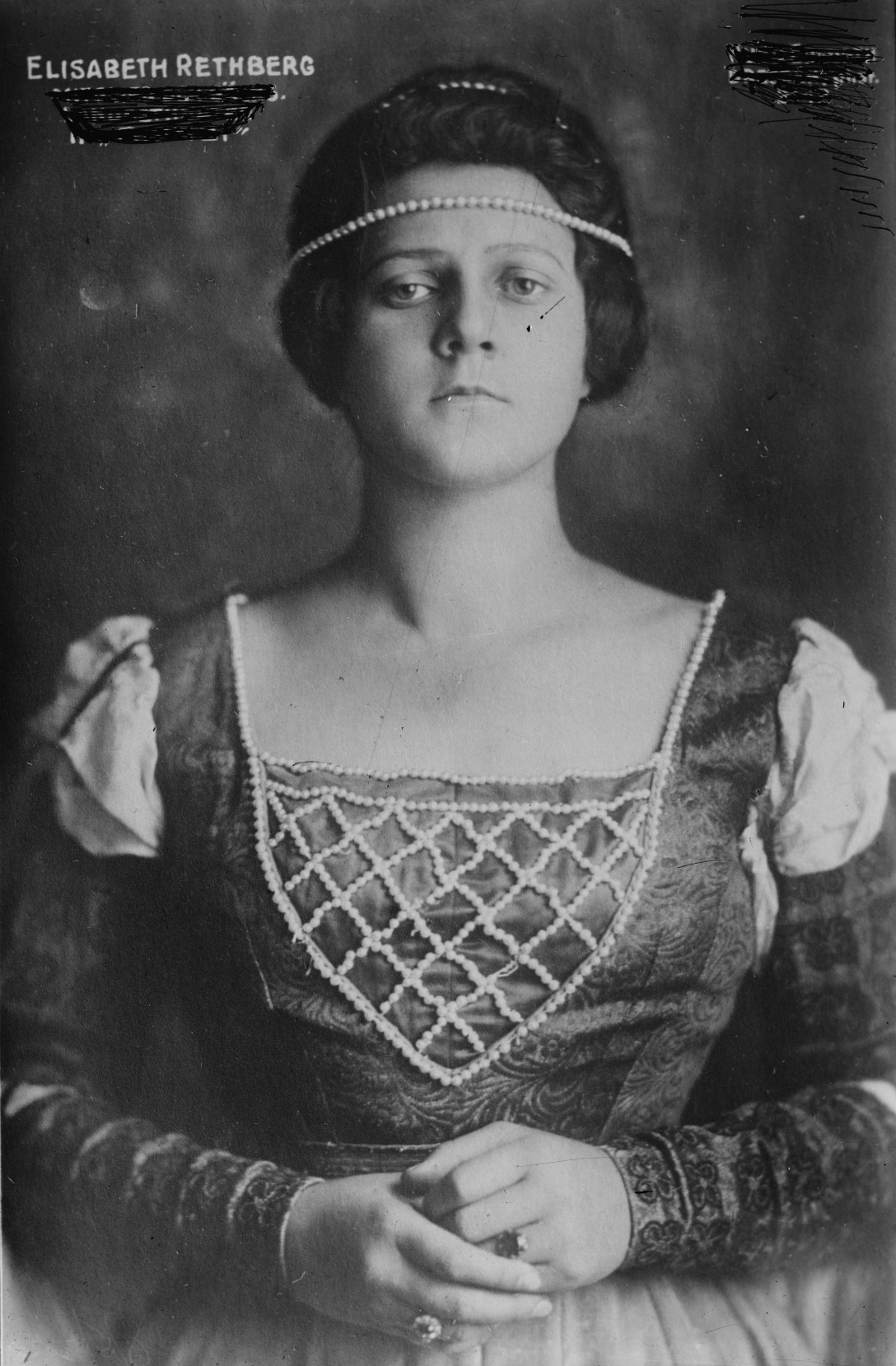
- Born: Lisbeth Sättler; 22 September 1894; Schwarzenberg, Germany
- Died: 6 June 1976 (aged 81); Yorktown Heights, New York, US
- Occupation: operatic spinto soprano
- Organizations: Dresden Opera; Metropolitan Opera

Elisabeth Rethberg (née Lisbeth Sättler; 22 September 1894 – 6 June 1976) was a German operatic spinto soprano singer who was active from the period of the First World War through the early 1940s. After Richard Strauss assigned the role of the Empress in his Die Frau ohne Schatten to her at the Dresden Opera in 1919, she went on to perform as Verdi's Aida at the Metropolitan Opera in New York City and La Scala in Milan, among others. She returned to Dresden often, including to appear in title role of Die ägyptische Helena in the world premiere.

== Life and career ==
=== Early years ===
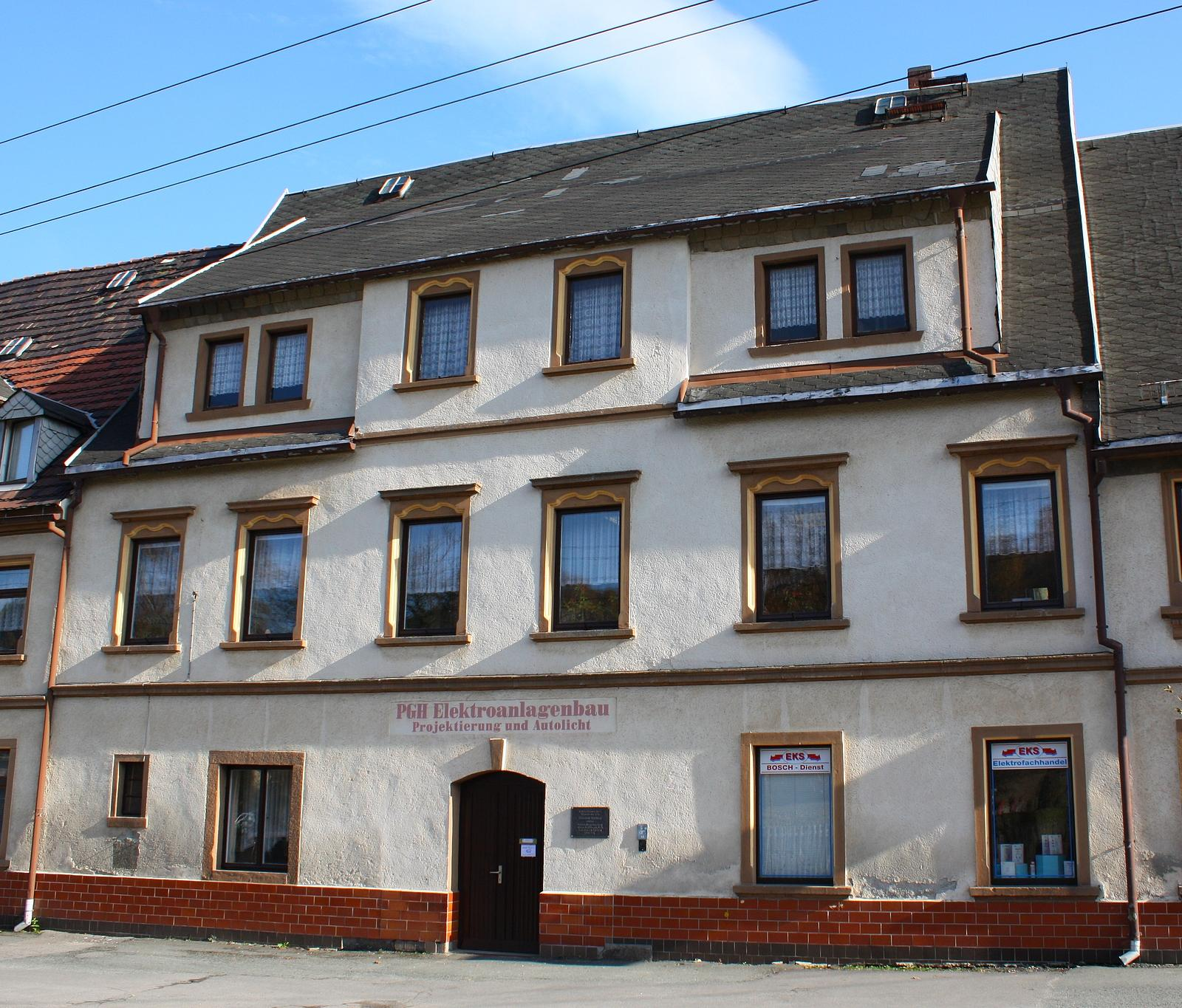
Rethberg's birthplace in Schwarzenberg

Lisbeth Sättler was born in Schwarzenberg. Her father was a teacher, and supplied her first musical education. She studied piano and voice at the Dresden Royal Conservatory from age 16 with Otto Watrin. She made her operatic debut in Dresden opposite Richard Tauber on 16 June 1915, as Arsena in the operetta Der Zigeunerbaron by Johann Strauss. In 1916 she performed leading roles such as the Countess Mozart's Figaro, Eva in Wagner's Die Meistersinger von Nürnberg. In 1919, Richard Strauss entrusted her to perform the role of the Empress in his Die Frau ohne Schatten, she was so successful that he wanted to engage her at the Vienna State Opera. She was then recognised internationally, and appeared at major operas houses in Europe.

== Metropolitan Opera ==
Rethberg sang with the Dresden Opera until 1922, when she made her debut at the Metropolitan Opera (Met) as Verdi's Aida. She moved to the US and remained with the Metropolitan Opera for 20 seasons, singing 30 roles. She studied further with Estelle Liebling in New York City. Her four Met opening nights (Wagner's Die Walküre, Mozarts Figaro and two times Aida) tie her with Licia Albanese as the soprano awarded the most Met opening nights. She also was engaged by London's Royal Opera House, where she sang in 1925 and from 1934–1939.

=== Other international performances ===
She appeared at the Salzburg Festival in Austria, to audiences at La Scala in Milan, where she performed again as Aida, conducted by Toscanini, and elsewhere in Europe.

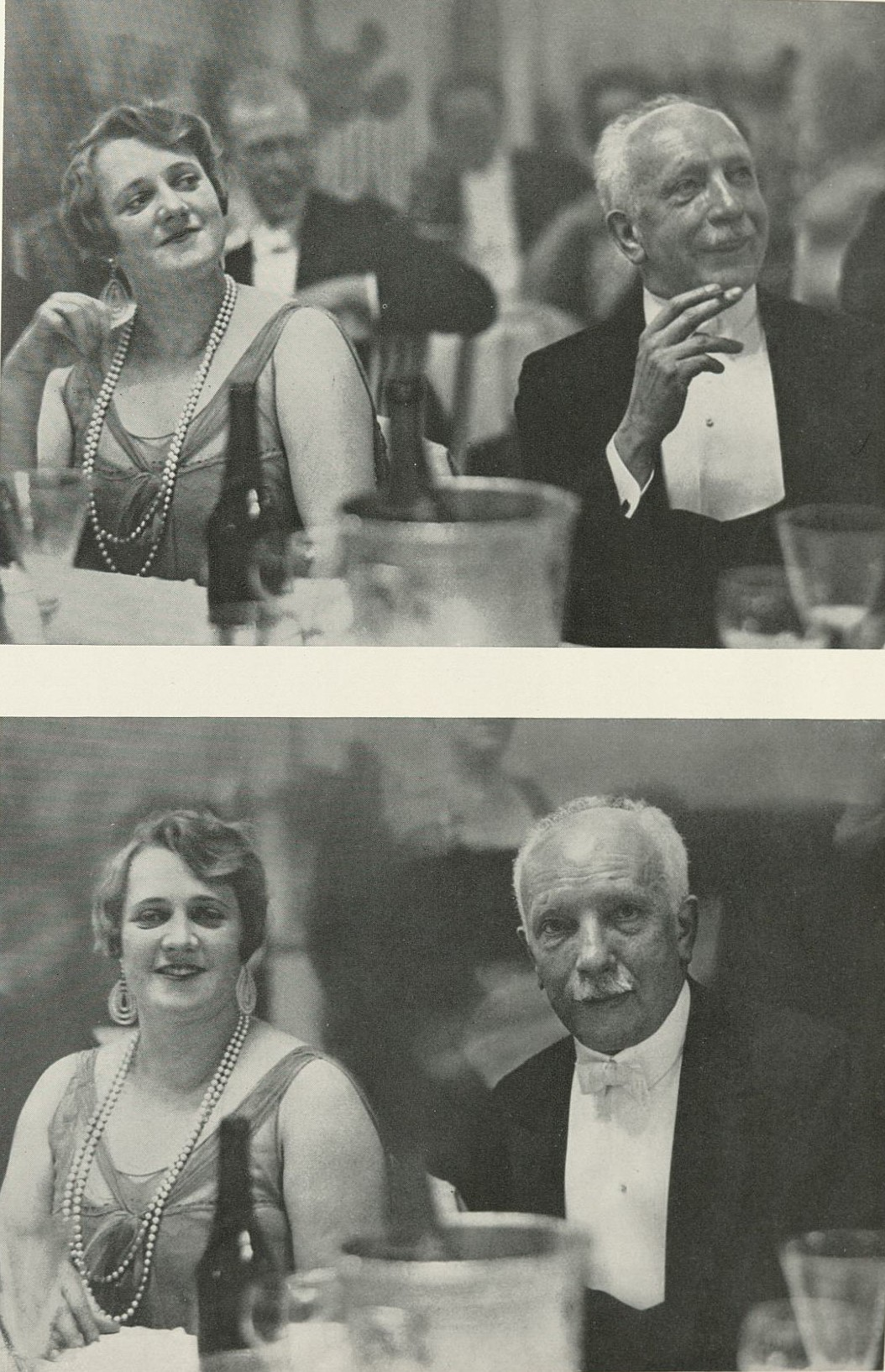
Rethberg and Strauss at the reception after the premiere of Die ägyptische Helena in 1928

Rethberg often returned to Dresden. In 1928, she created the title role in Strauss's Die ägyptische Helena, conducted by Fritz Busch. She retired from the stage in 1942.

=== Personal life ===
Rethberg was first married to Ernst Albert Dormann. In 1956, she married the Russian-born Met comprimario singer George Cehanovsky.

Rethberg died in Yorktown Heights at age 81

== Recordings ==
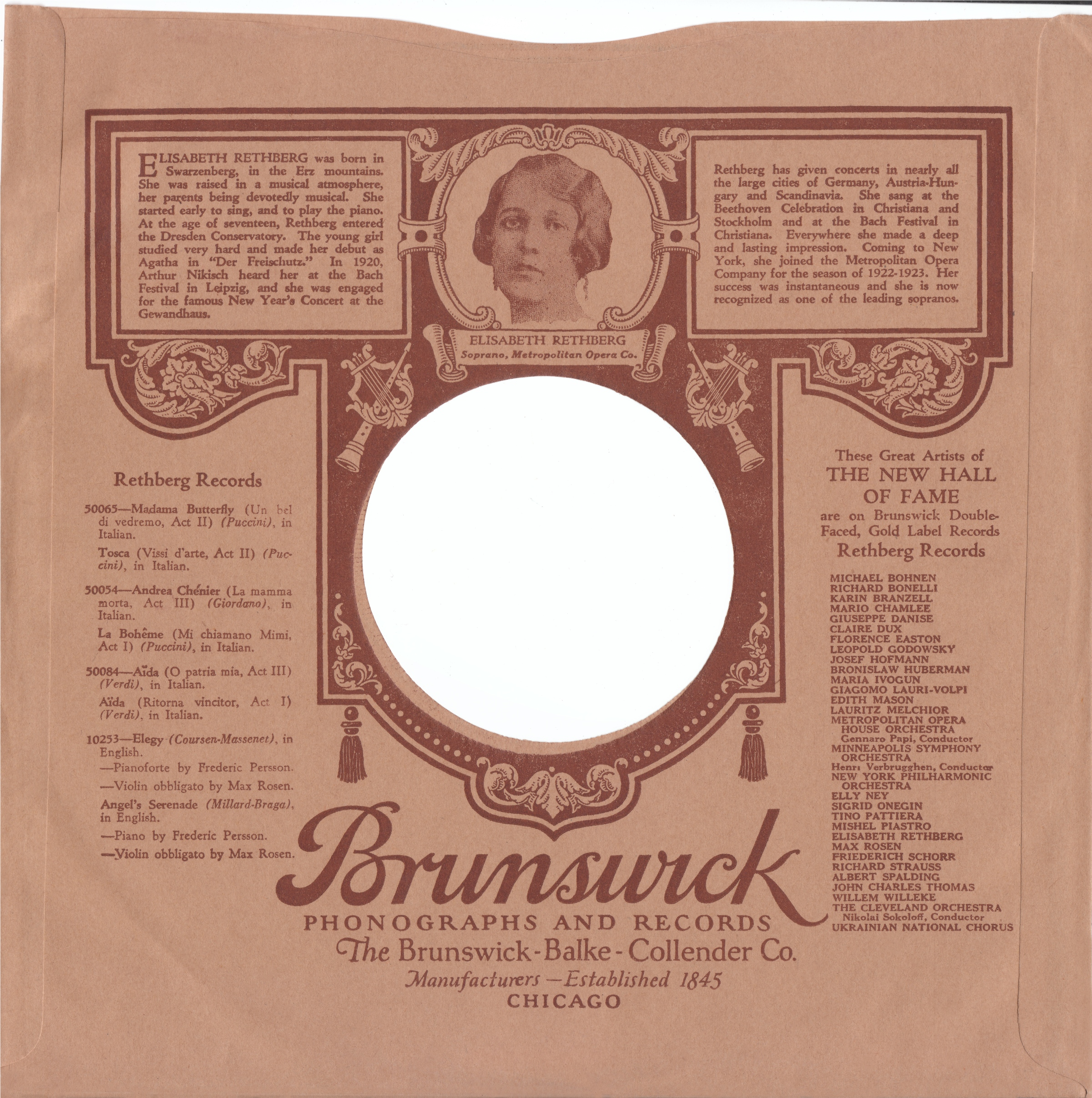
78 rpm record paper sleeve

Rethberg made recordings of arias and ensemble pieces in Germany and the United States between 1921 and the outbreak of the Second World War. Many of these are available on LP and CD transfers.*

The most notable records of her art include live Metropolitan Opera recordings of her role in the complete operas, including Marriage of Figaro, Verdi's Simon Boccanegra and Otello, and Wagner's Lohengrin. Concerning her lieder discography, she was included in the 1930s Hugo Wolf Society recording project (e.g. "Müh'voll komm' ich und beladen").

Rethberg had a distinctive lyrical but focused voice felt to be at once extremely feminine and penetrating. She is heard in live recordings later in her career of Lohengrin opposite Lauritz Melchior, Otello opposite Giovanni Martinelli and Lawrence Tibbett, and Simon Boccanegra, again with Martinelli and Tibbett. Only a few measures exist of her Leonora in Verdi's Il trovatore opposite Martinelli and Richard Bonelli. While no full recordings exist of her most famous role, Aida, she recorded many extracts from it in the studio. A combination of live performances and studio recordings remain of her rendition of Amelia from Verdi's Un Ballo in Maschera, that possibly best illustrate the combined lyric and dramatic potential of her voice.
