= Raft =

Flat structure for support or transportation over water

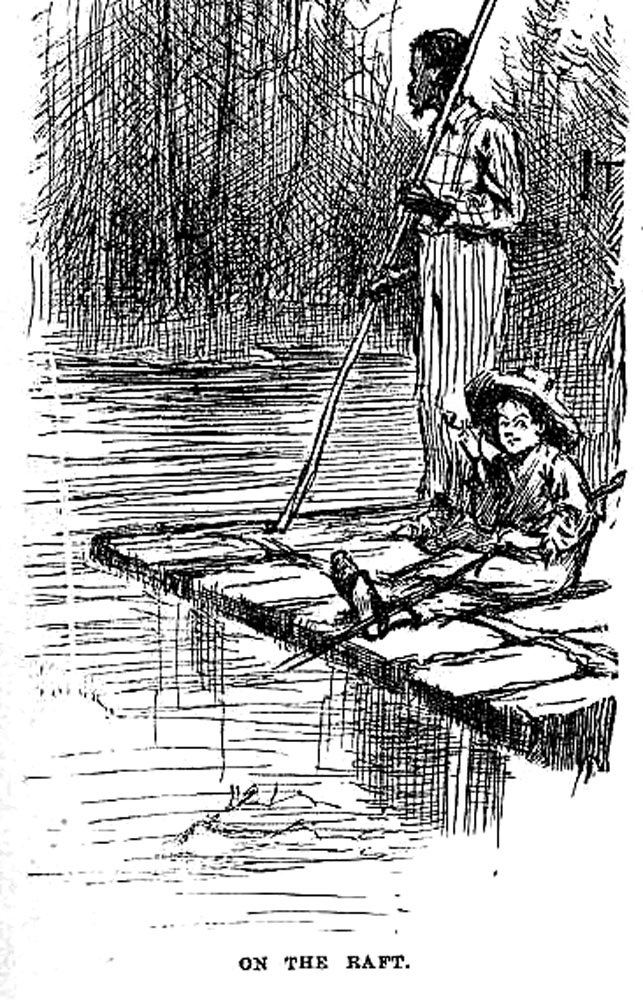
Traditional raft, from the 1884 edition of Adventures of Huckleberry Finn

A raft is any flat structure for support or transportation over water. It is usually of basic design, characterized by the absence of a hull. Rafts are usually kept afloat by using any combination of buoyant materials such as wood, sealed barrels, or inflated air chambers (such as pontoons) and are typically not propelled by an engine. Rafts are an ancient mode of transport; naturally occurring rafts such as entwined vegetation and pieces of wood have been used to traverse water since the dawn of humanity.

== Human-made rafts ==
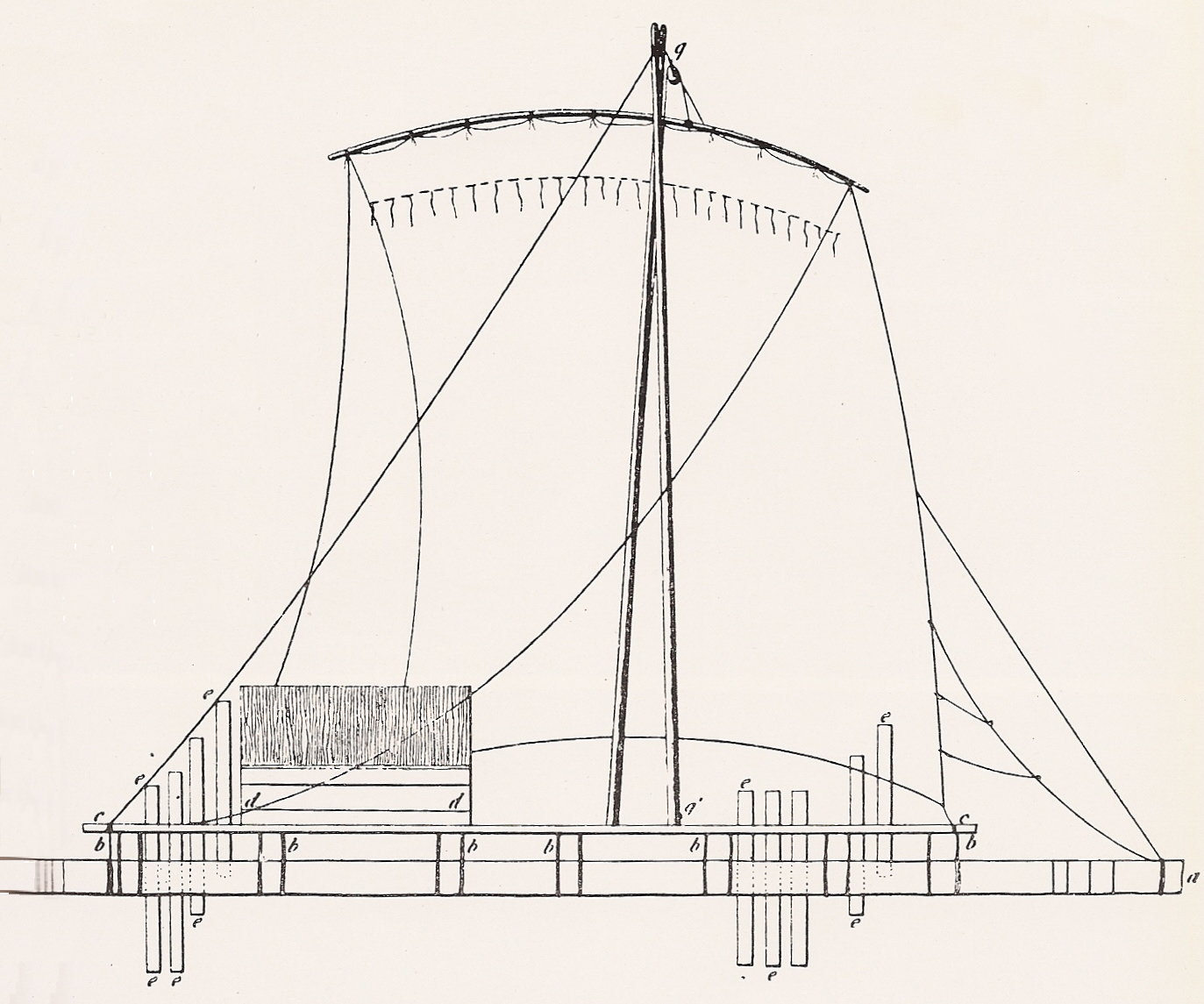
Sketch by F.E. Paris (1841) showing construction of a native Peruvian balsa raft

Traditional or primitive rafts were constructed of wood, bamboo, or reeds; early buoyed or float rafts use inflated animal skins or sealed clay pots, which are lashed together. Modern float rafts may also use pontoons, drums, or extruded polystyrene blocks. Depending on its use and size, it may have a superstructure, masts, or rudders.

Timber rafting is used by the logging industry for the transportation of logs by tying them together into rafts and drifting or pulling them down a river. This method was very common up until the middle of the 20th century but is now used only rarely.

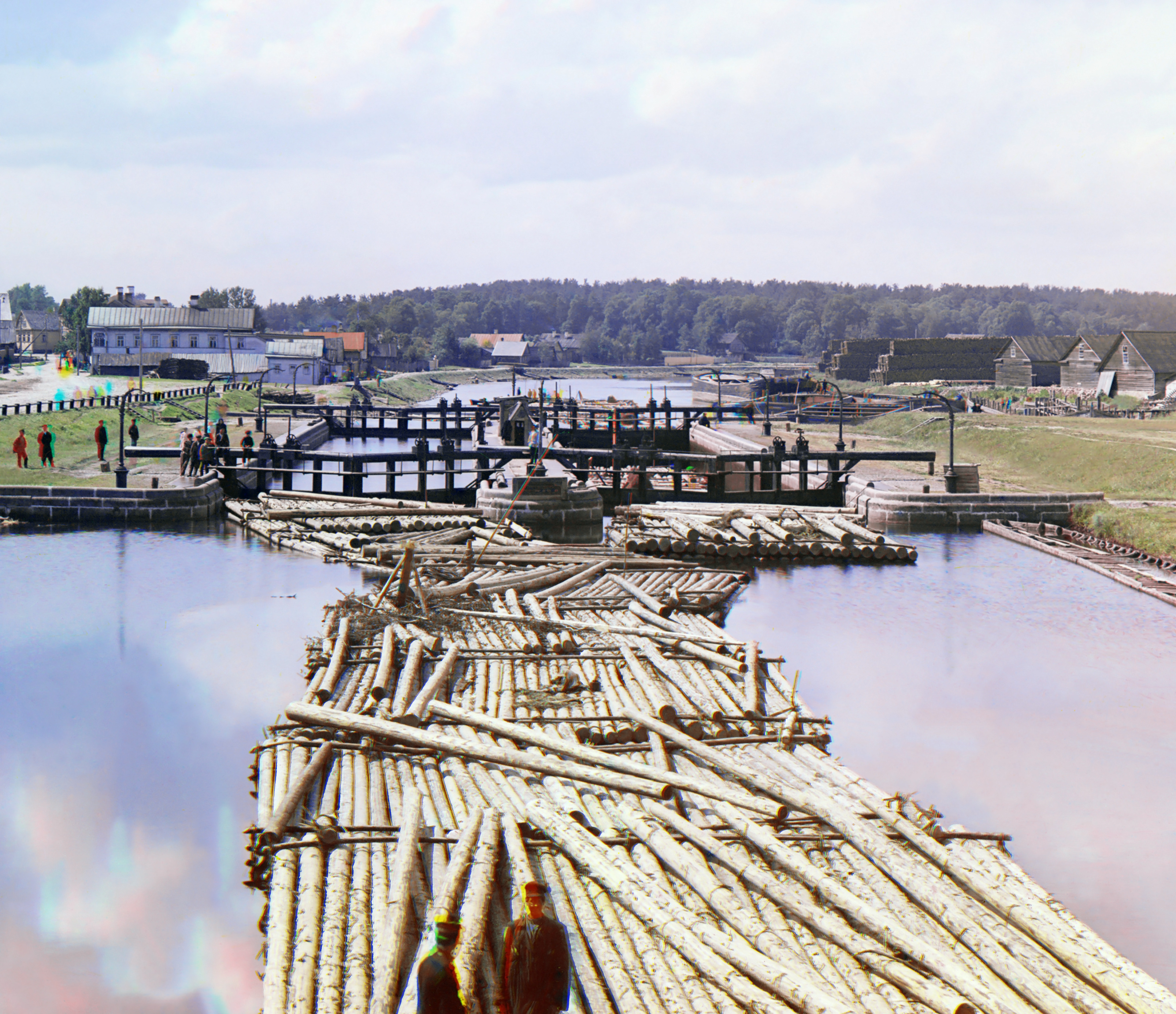
Lumber rafts on the Peter I Canal. Early 20th-century picture by S. Prokudin-Gorsky.

Large rafts made of balsa logs and using sails for navigation were important in maritime trade on the Pacific Ocean coast of South America from pre-Columbian times until the 19th century. Voyages were made to locations as far away as Mexico, and many trans-Pacific voyages using replicas of ancient rafts have been undertaken to demonstrate possible contacts between South America and Polynesia.

Rafts used for recreational rafting are almost exclusively inflatable rafts, manufactured of flexible materials such as PVC, hypalon, polyurethane, and nylon. These materials are resistant to the collisions and heavy wear the boats experience when traveling through whitewater. Whitewater rafts are also designed with high rocker, a raised bow and stern, which allows them to pass over waves and obstacles more easily. Most have drain holes in the floor to prevent the boat from becoming swamped with water.

== Natural rafts ==
In biology, particularly in island biogeography, non-manmade rafts are an important concept. Such rafts consist of matted clumps of vegetation that has been swept off the dry land by a storm, tsunami, tide, earthquake, or similar event; in modern times they sometimes also incorporate other kind of flotsam and jetsam, e.g. plastic containers. They stay afloat by their natural buoyancy and can travel for hundreds, even thousands of miles and are ultimately destroyed by wave action and decomposition or make landfall.

Rafting events are important means of oceanic dispersal for non-flying animals. For amphibians, reptiles, and small mammals, in particular, but for many invertebrates as well, such rafts of vegetation were often the only means by which they could reach and – if they were lucky – colonize oceanic islands before human-built vehicles provided another mode of transport.

== Image gallery ==
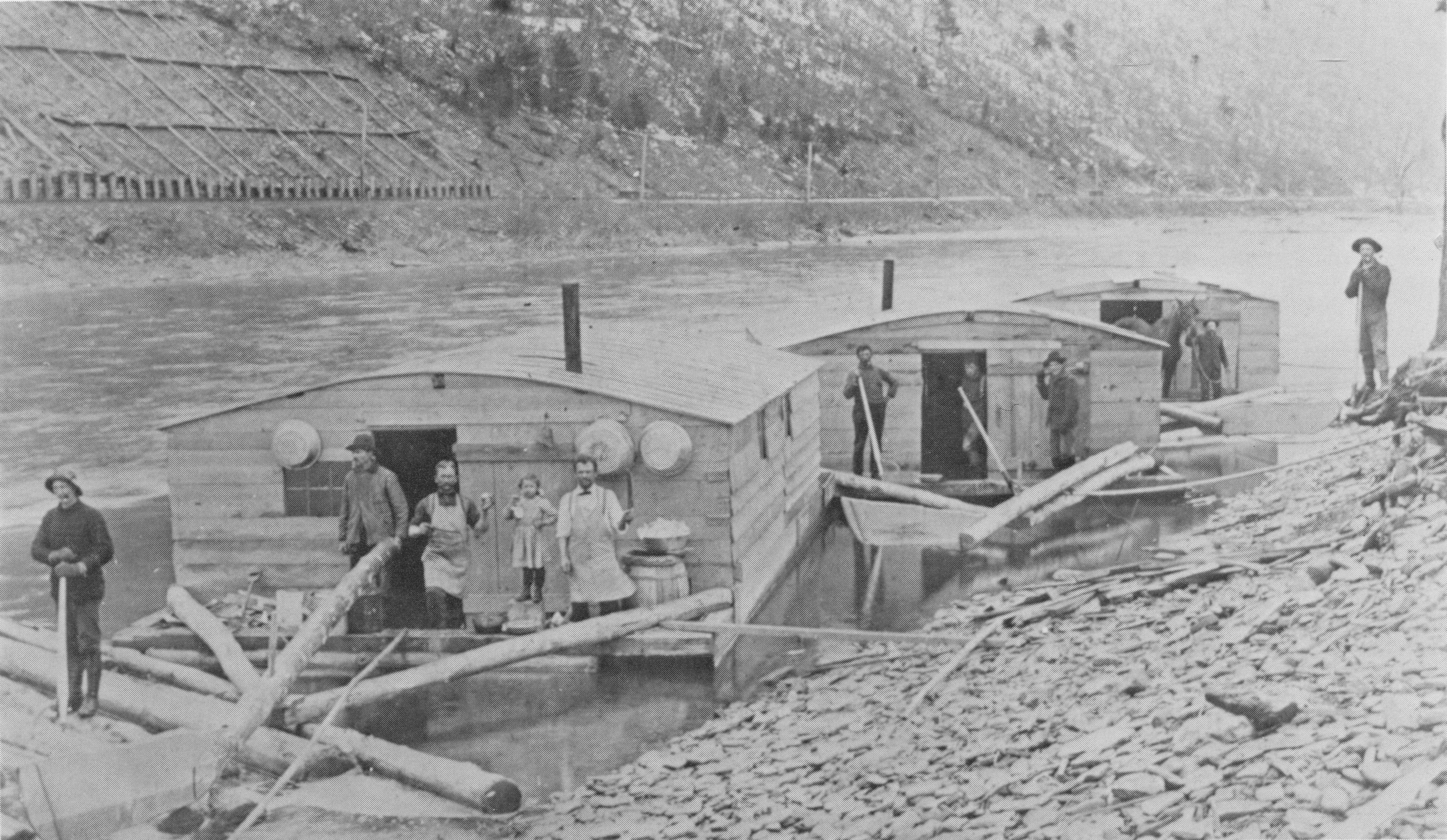
Three Arks for a log drive on Pine Creek, in Lycoming or Tioga County, Pennsylvania. The left ark was for cooking and dining, the middle ark was the sleeping quarters and the right ark was for the horses. The arks were built for just one log drive and then sold for their lumber. The line of the Jersey Shore, Pine Creek and Buffalo Railway can be seen on the eastern shore: the mountainside behind it is nearly bare of trees from clearcutting.

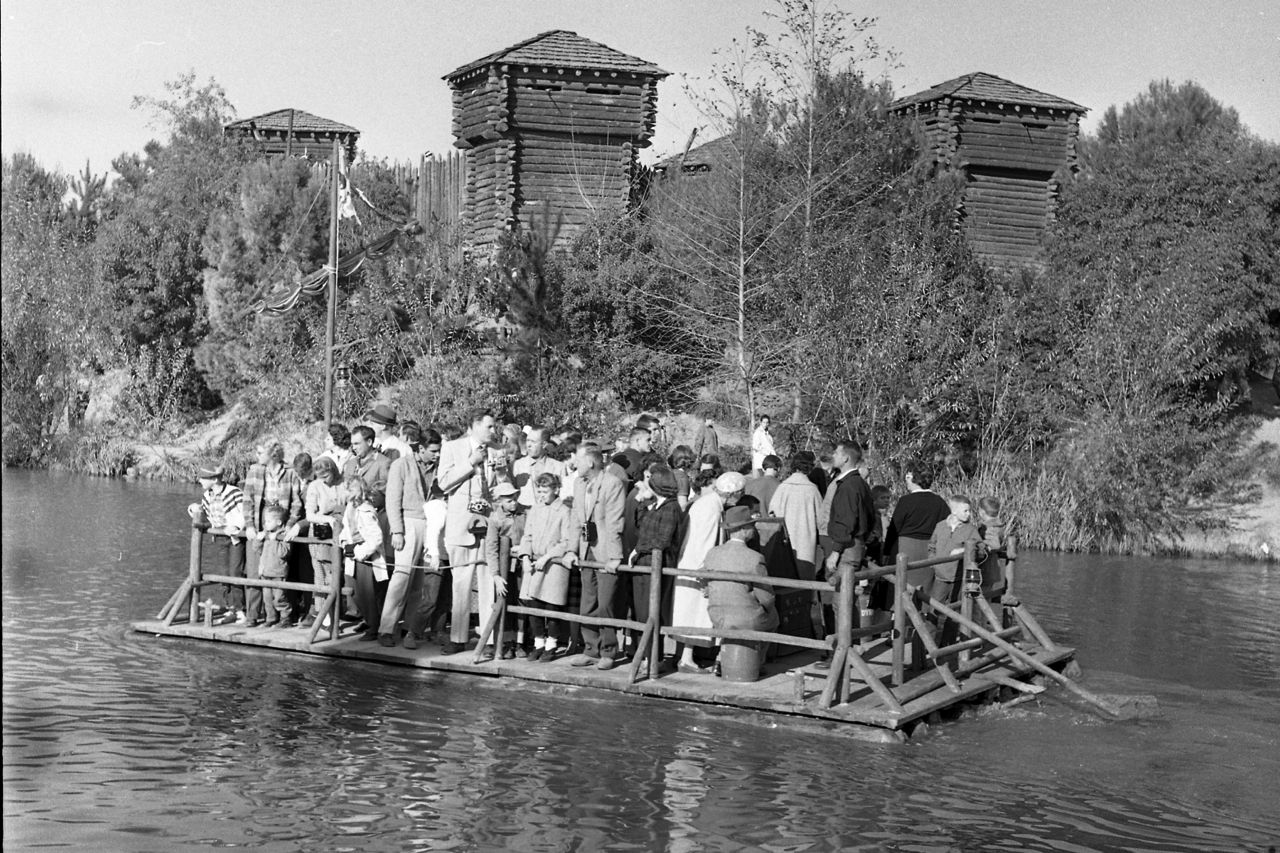
Raft carrying visitors to Tom Sawyer Island at Disneyland, about 1960

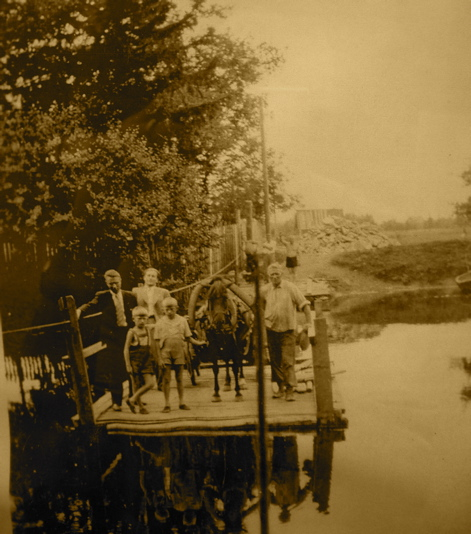
People on a raft in Estonia, 1944

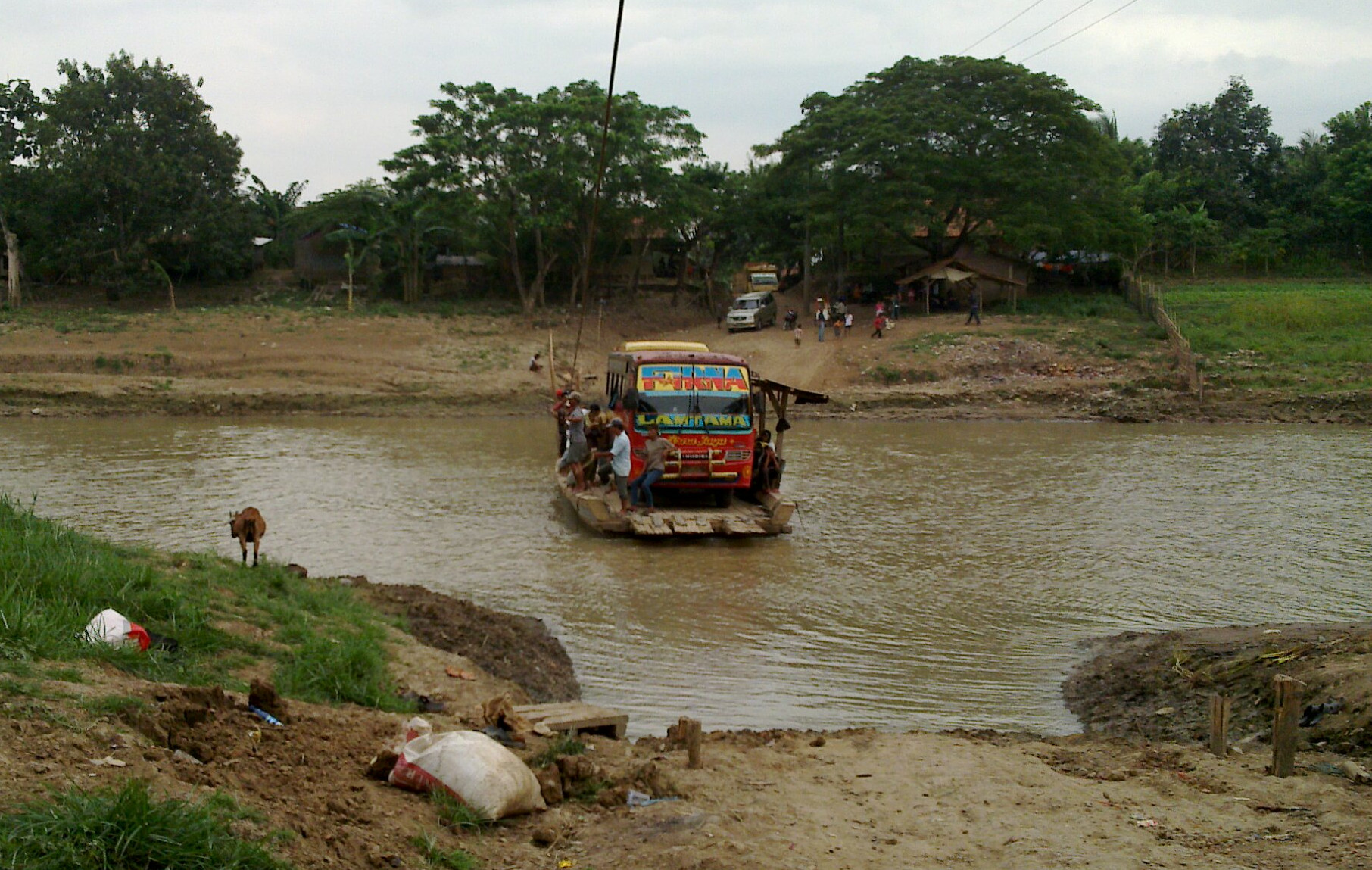
Raft used to ferry vehicles at Citarum River, Karawang, West Java, Indonesia

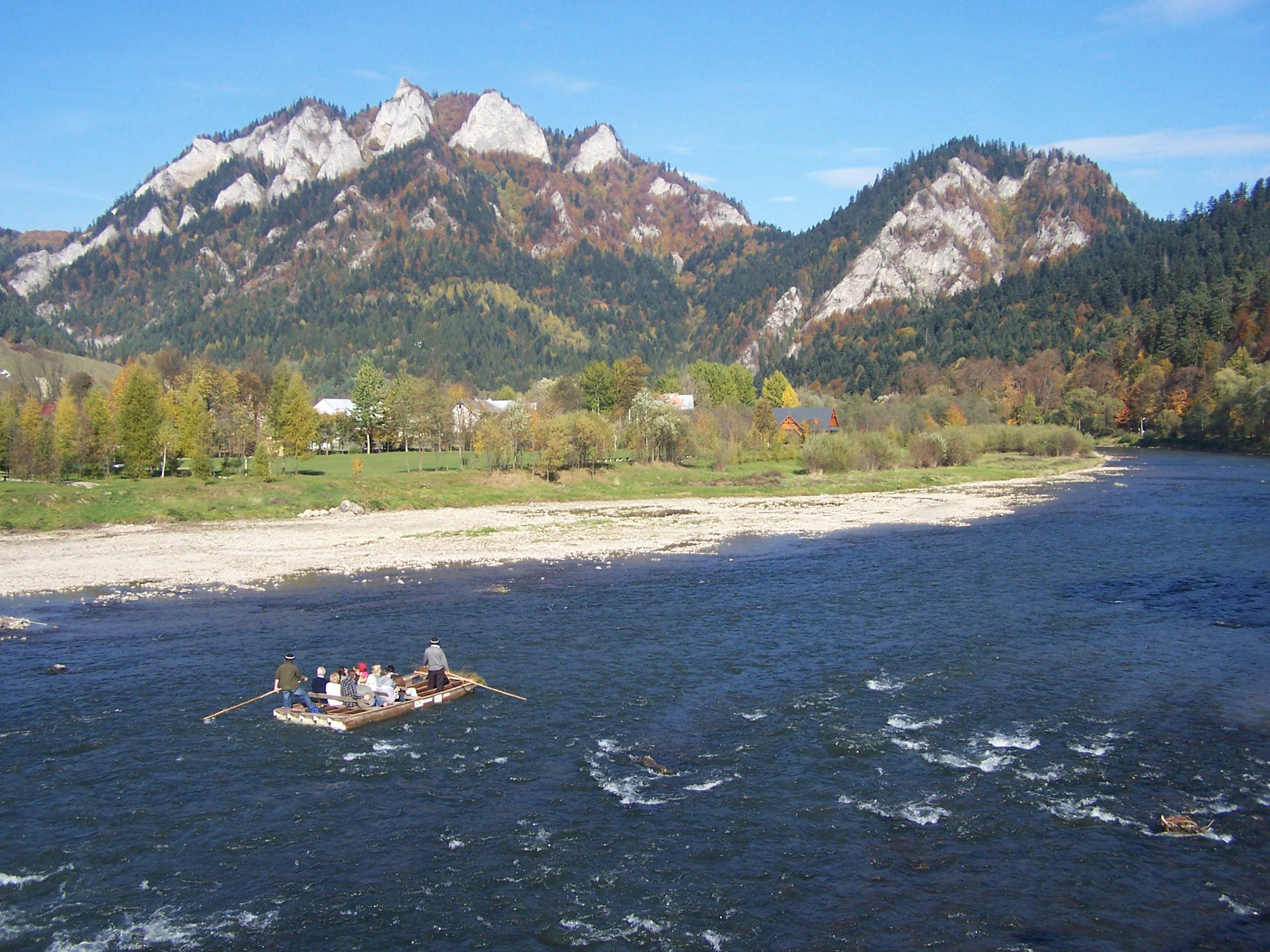
Rafting on the Dunajec River at Pieniny National Park, Poland

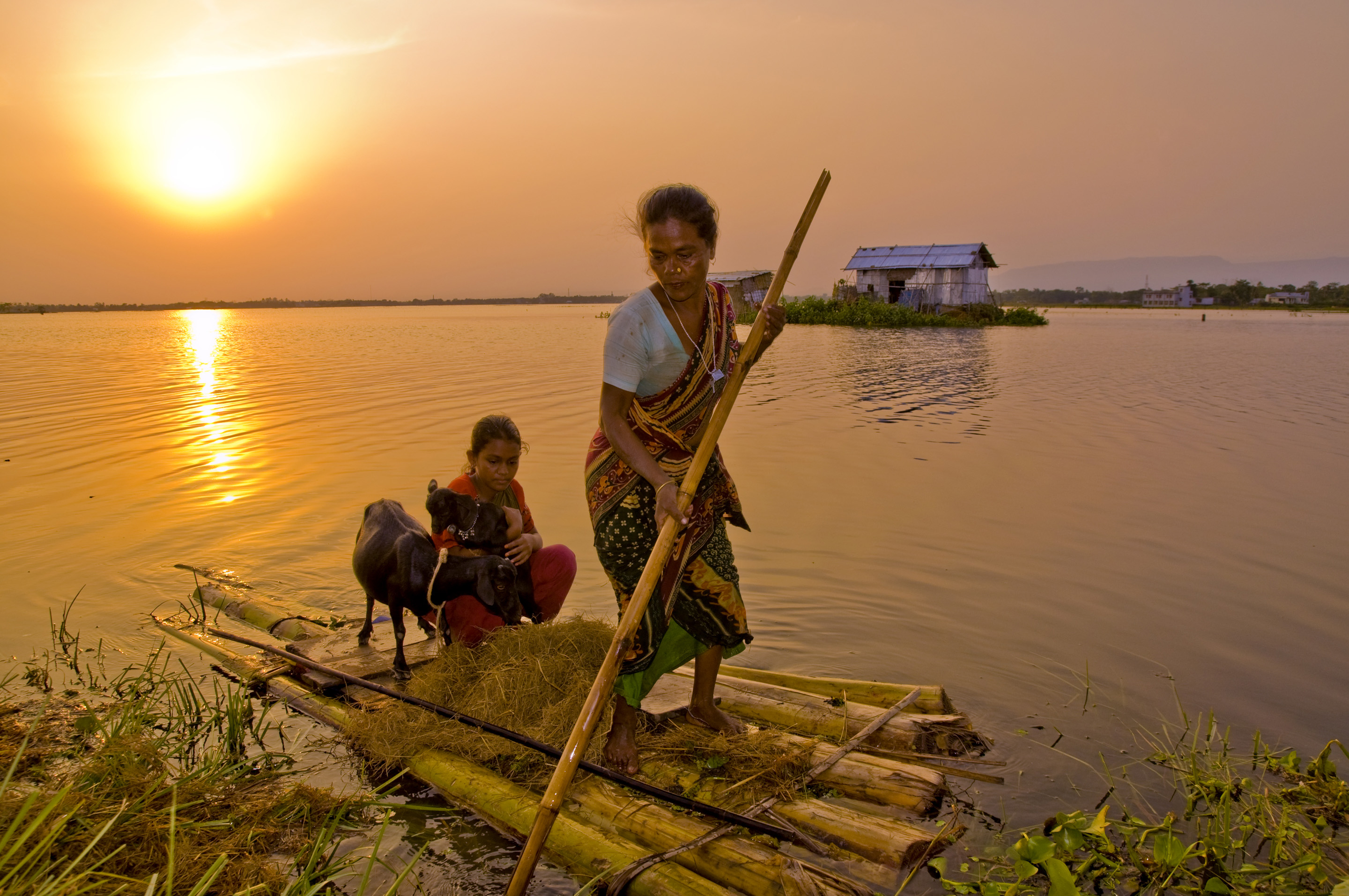
A woman using a raft to transport her daughter and goats in the haors of Bangladesh

== See also ==
- Floating island
- Great Raft
- Kon-Tiki
- L’Égaré II
- La Balsa and Las Balsas
- Lifeboat
- Pre-Columbian rafts
- Pumice raft
- The Raft of the Medusa
- Thor Heyerdahl
- Poon Lim
