= Lyric soprano =

Type of operatic soprano voice

A lyric soprano is a type of operatic soprano voice that has a warm quality with a bright, full timbre that can be heard over an orchestra. The lyric soprano voice generally has a higher tessitura than a soubrette and usually plays ingenues and other sympathetic characters in opera. Lyric sopranos have a range from approximately middle C (C_{4}) to "high D" (D_{6}). This is the most common female singing voice. There is a tendency to divide lyric sopranos into two groups: light and full.

== Light lyric soprano ==
A light-lyric soprano has a bigger voice than a soubrette but still possesses a youthful quality. There are a wide variety of roles written for this voice, and they may sing soubrette, baroque and other light roles as well.

=== Light lyric soprano roles ===
- Alice, Le comte Ory (Gioachino Rossini)
- Ännchen, Der Freischütz (Carl Maria von Weber) (or soubrette)
- Annina, La traviata (Giuseppe Verdi)
- Antonia, The Tales of Hoffmann (Jacques Offenbach)
- Clorinda, La Cenerentola (Gioachino Rossini)
- Despina, Così fan tutte (Wolfgang Amadeus Mozart) (or soubrette)
- Euridice, Orfeo ed Euridice (Christoph Willibald Gluck)
- Giulietta, The Tales of Hoffmann (Jacques Offenbach)
- Gretel, Hänsel und Gretel (Engelbert Humperdinck)
- Juliette, Roméo et Juliette (Charles Gounod)
- Laurie Moss, The Tender Land (Aaron Copland)
- Lauretta, Gianni Schicchi (Giacomo Puccini)
- Marguerite, Faust (Charles Gounod)
- Marzelline, Fidelio (Ludwig van Beethoven)
- Manon, Manon (Jules Massenet)
- Musetta, La bohème (Puccini)
- Pamina, The Magic Flute (Mozart)
- Servilia, La clemenza di Tito (Mozart)
- Sophie, Der Rosenkavalier (Richard Strauss)
- Sophie, Werther (Jules Massenet)
- Susanna, The Marriage of Figaro (Mozart) (or soubrette)
- Zerlina, Don Giovanni (Mozart) (or soubrette)

== Full lyric soprano ==
A full-lyric soprano has a more mature sound than a light-lyric soprano and can be heard over a bigger orchestra. This more mature sound may make a full-lyric less suitable for some of the lighter roles. Occasionally a full lyric will have a big enough voice that she can take on much heavier roles, using volume in place of vocal weight. This is done when a more lyric timbre is desired in an otherwise heavier role. Otherwise full lyric sopranos need be judicious with spinto and other heavy roles to prevent vocal deterioration.

=== Full lyric soprano roles ===
- Emilia, The Makropulos Case (Leoš Janáček)
- La Contessa, The Marriage of Figaro (Wolfgang Amadeus Mozart)
- Liù, Turandot (Giacomo Puccini)
- Lulu, Lulu (Alban Berg)
- The Marschallin, Der Rosenkavalier (Richard Strauss)
- Magda, La rondine (Puccini)
- Wally, La Wally (Alfredo Catalani)
- Mimì, La bohème (Puccini)
- Micaëla, Carmen (Georges Bizet)
- Rusalka, Rusalka (Antonín Dvořák)
- Tatyana, Eugene Onegin (Pyotr Ilyich Tchaikovsky)
- Hanna, The Merry Widow (Franz Lehár)
- Bess, Porgy and Bess (George Gershwin)

== See also ==
- Coloratura soprano
- Spinto soprano
- Dramatic soprano
- Soubrette
