= Benoît Lecomte =

French swimmer

Ben Lecomte
- Born: June 3, 1967 (age 59); France
- Education: B.B.A. Marketing '95 The University of Texas at San Antonio
- Known for: Long-distance swimming
- Website: www.thelongestswim.com

Benoit Lecomte (born 1967) is a French-American long-distance swimmer who swam several sections of the Atlantic Ocean in 1998. Many major media outlets initially wrongly reported that he swam the entire distance across the ocean, but the claim was dismissed and is not officially recognized by Guinness World Records since there is uncertainty about the distance that Lecomte actually covered swimming due to the fact he rested and slept on a boat as it drifted and made progress towards their final destination.

== Atlantic Ocean swim ==
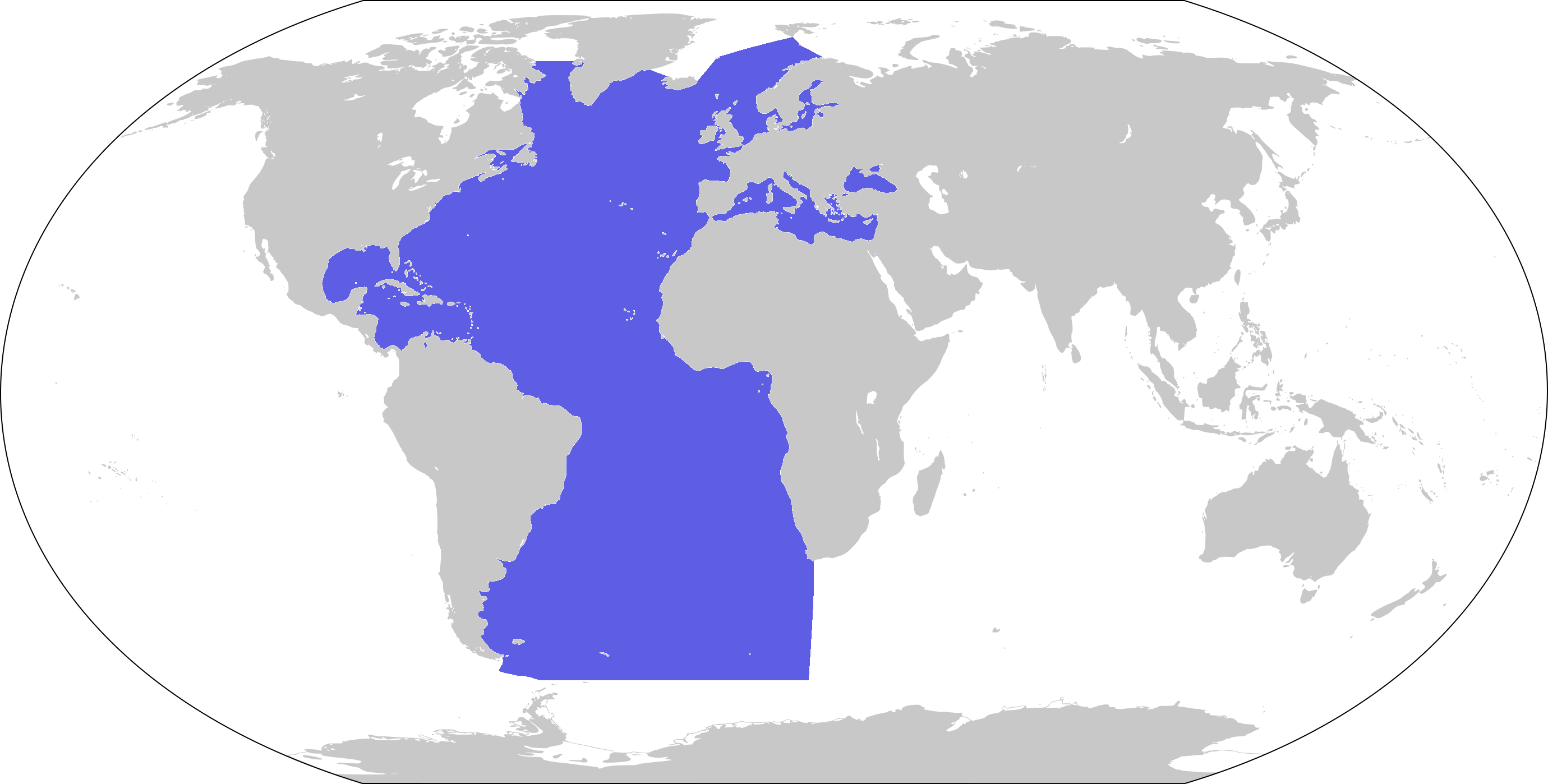
Atlantic Ocean

From 16 March to 25 September 1998, Lecomte undertook a swim in stages from Hyannis, Massachusetts to Quiberon, Brittany, France, including a one-week stop in the Azores, a Portuguese archipelago.

During his 73-day, 3,716-mile (5,980 km; 3,229 nmi) journey, Lecomte was accompanied by a 40-foot (12 m) sailboat that had an electromagnetic field for 25 ft (7.6 m) to ward off sharks. He was accompanied by a crew of three aboard the sailboat, where he could rest and eat between each swimming period. Lecomte typically spent eight hours swimming each day in sessions of two to four hours.

The stated purpose of the swim was to raise money for cancer research as a tribute to his father.

Since there is no standard definition of "swimming across the Atlantic", there is uncertainty about the distance that Lecomte actually covered swimming in the water rather than riding in a boat with the prevailing currents. According to the Rocky Mountain News, Lecomte would have had to average 8 mph (13 km/h; 3.6 m/s) to have swum the entire distance, 3 to 4 times as fast as other long-distance swimmers.

=== Other Atlantic Ocean swim claims ===
- Guy Delage – swim from Cape Verde Islands to Barbados in 1994
- Jennifer Figge – swim from Cape Verde Islands to Trinidad in 2009

== The Pacific Swim ==
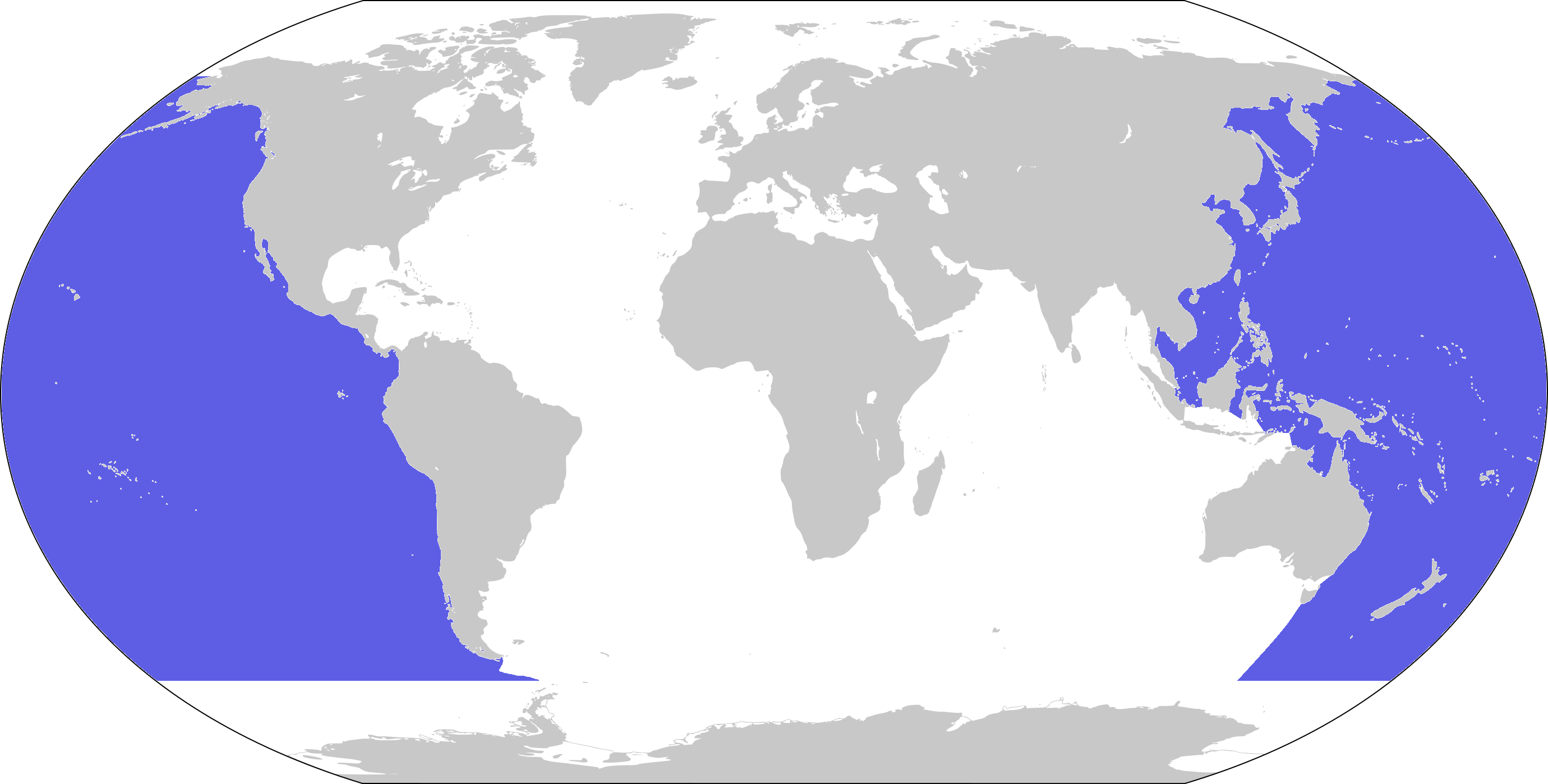
Pacific Ocean

Benoit Lecomte began his swim of the Pacific Ocean on Tuesday June 5th 2018. He began in Chōshi Japan in the Kantō region, and hoped to make it to California. The distance to be covered was approximately 5,500 mi (8,900 km; 4,800 nmi) and hoped to end up in San Francisco, California. He expected the trip to take about six months. Part of the reason for the swim was to raise awareness about sustainability and the impact of excessive human garbage polluting the world's oceans. Lecomte said:

"Before anything else I am a father and as a father the future of my children concerns me because, as we all know, our way of life is not sustainable. I don't want to be passive and pass on to my children the liability we are tagging on to our environment. We can all make a difference once we realize how we can be better stewards of the environment and our own ecological footprint, make appropriate daily changes and inspire others to do the same. This is the first goal of this event and is intended to get people's attention throughout the world and to understand that the solution is in our hands and that we can take action.

The second goal is to encourage and work with the education system in all countries to include classes on sustainability and what our ecological footprints are into their own curriculum, because, as we all know, sustainability starts with education."

Lecomte was accompanied by a crew and performed a "staged swim" (resuming the swim in the exact location in which he left the water) using a GPS tracking device, enabling him to accurately track the number of miles he completed thus enabling him to reach a new world record in open water swimming. Lecomte planned to average about 40 mi (64 km) a day, swimming eight hours with the help of the current.

After about 1,700 miles of swimming, the main sail of Lecomte's assistance boat had been repeatedly torn by heavy winds. The team repaired the tears over and over, breaking nine pencil-sized needles during the trip, but Lecomte ultimately decided to cancel the swim to keep his crew safe.
