= Wulf Konold =

German musicologist

Wulf Konold (29 June 1946 – 24 June 2010) was a German musicologist, dramaturge and theatre director.

== Life ==
Born in Langenau near Ulm, From 1966 to 1973 Konold studied musicology, German studies and History at the Christian-Albrechts-University as well as viola, music composition and conducting at the Lübeck Academy of Music. After his doctorate in 1974 under Kurt Gudewill with his thesis Secular cantatas in the 20th century he became a research assistant at the University of Kiel. From 1975 to 1978 he was head of the department for serious music at Saarländischer Rundfunk. From 1978 he was chief dramatic advisor at the Staatstheater Nürnberg, from 1982 dramatic advisor and artistic advisor at the Staatsoper Hannover and from 1988 chief dramatic advisor at the Hamburgische Staatsoper, where he also directed. From 1996 to 2008 he was General Director and Opera director of the Städtische Bühnen Nürnberg (since 2003 Staatstheater Nürnberg). From 2005 to 2009 he was also artistic director of the Ludwigsburger Schlossfestspiele.

In 1982 he founded the "Ensemble Musica Viva Hannover", and from 1989 to 1996 he conducted the Kiel Chamber Orchestra. As a musicologist, he took on teaching positions at the Saarland University, the Hochschule für Musik Saar, the University of Erlangen–Nuremberg, the Hochschule für Musik, Theater und Medien Hannover (as professorial representative), the University of Hamburg, the Hochschule für Musik Nürnberg and the State University of Music and Performing Arts Stuttgart. In 2001 he was appointed honorary professor. Most recently he taught at the Ludwig-Maximilians-Universität München.

Konold was the brother of the set and costume designer Dietlind Konold. He had two sons and a daughter. Konold died of cancer in Munich at the age of 63.

== Work ==
- Weltliche Kantaten im 20. Jahrhundert. Dissertation, Christian-Albrechts-Universität zu Kiel 1974.
- Wulf Konold (Ges.-Red.), Klaus-Jürgen Etzold (Co-advisor.) among others: Das Niedersächsische Staatsorchester Hannover 1636–1986.
- Bernd Alois Zimmermann : der Komponist und sein Werk.
- Rudolf Kloiber: Handbuch der Oper. Newly edited and supplemented by Wulf Konold. dtv / Bärenreiter.
- Monographs on Claudio Monteverdi, Bernd Alois Zimmermann und zur Geschichte des Streichquartetts.
- Felix Mendelssohn Bartholdy und seine Zeit.
