= Rudolf Kloiber =

German conductor and musicologist

Rudolf Kloiber (14 November 1899 – 12 December 1973) was a German conductor and musicologist.

Born in Munich, Kloiber studied conducting, piano, music theory and opera direction at the University of Music and Performing Arts Munich, as well as musicology at the Ludwig-Maximilians-Universität München. In 1928, he received his doctorate in this subject with a dissertation about the composer Christian Cannabich. From 1921, he worked as an opera and concert conductor, from 1935 at the Theater Regensburg and from 1950 to 1958 with the Swabian Symphony Orchestra in Reutlingen, the later Württembergische Philharmonie Reutlingen.

He became particularly well known as the author of various music handbooks, which are still very popular today because of their objective and well-founded presentation.

== Work ==
- Die dramatischen Ballette von Christian Cannabich. Inaugural-Dissertation. 1928.
- Rudolf Kloiber, Wulf Konold, Robert Maschka: Handbuch der Oper. 11th revised edition. Bärenreiter/dtv, Kassel among others/Munich 2006 (1951), ISBN 3-423-34132-7
- Handbuch der klassischen und romantischen Symphonie. 2nd expended edition. Breitkopf & Härtel, Wiesbaden 1976 (1964), ISBN 3-7651-0017-X
- Handbuch der Symphonischen Dichtung. 3rd edition. Breitkopf & Härtel, Wiesbaden 1990 (1967), ISBN 3-7651-0018-8
- Handbuch des Instrumentalkonzerts.
  - Vol. 1: Vom Barock zur Klassik. Breitkopf & Härtel, Wiesbaden 1972, ISBN 3-7651-0052-8
  - Vol. 2: Von der Romantik bis zu den Begründern der Neuen Musik. 3rd revised edition. Breitkopf & Härtel, Wiesbaden 1987 (1973), ISBN 3-7651-0064-1
