= L'Égaré II =

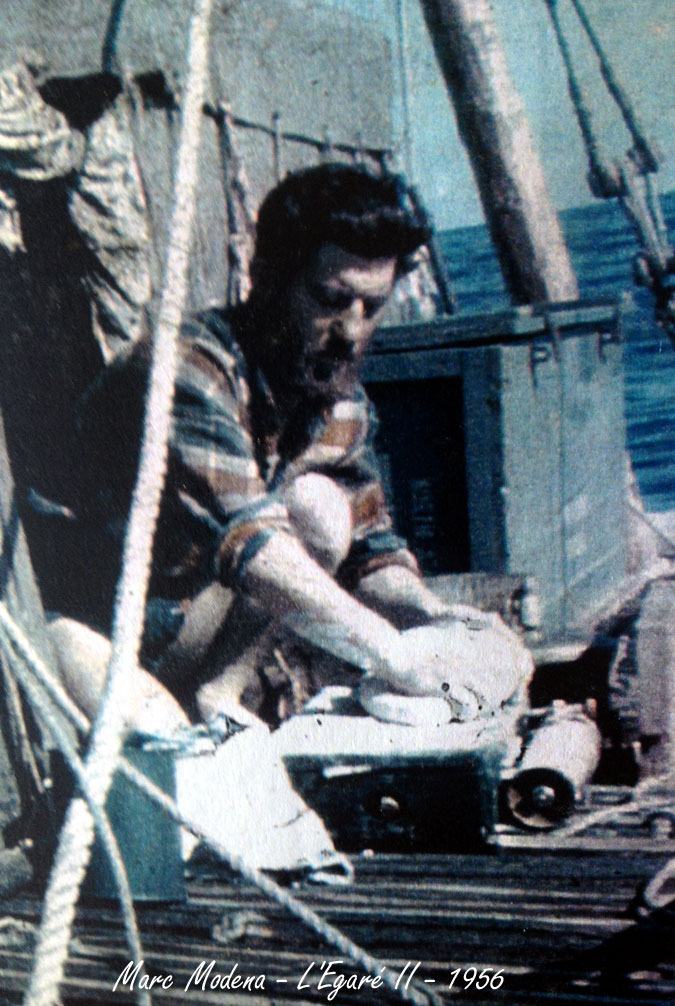
Marc Modena making bread on deck of the ship (1956).

L’Égaré II was the name of a raft used by a French crew in 1956 to cross the Atlantic Ocean. The expedition, led by Henri Beaudout, departed from Halifax, Nova Scotia, arriving 88 days later at Falmouth, England.

== Henri Beaudout ==
Henri Beaudout, originally from Limoges, France, emigrated to Montreal, Canada, in 1952. In an effort to avoid dwelling on painful memories of war, Beaudout struck the idea of founding an explorers club. To do so, he felt it necessary to first undertake some kind of endeavour that would qualify him for such a club. He began considering a trans-Atlantic crossing from Canada to Europe. As the Atlantic Ocean had already been crossed by boats, he knew such a journey somehow needed to be unique. After three years studying the prevailing winds, currents, and meteorological conditions of the north Atlantic, he concluded that a west-to-east crossing would be possible, especially using the northern extension of the Gulf Stream known as the North Atlantic Drift. He eventually decided on using a raft.

== First Attempt ==
In 1955, Henri Beaudout with a small crew of two attempted to cross the Atlantic Ocean by raft. Setting out from Longueuil (across from Montreal), and travelling down the Saint Lawrence Seaway, the expedition ended after 66 days when the raft, L’Égaré I, having been caught in the remnants of hurricane "Connie," ran aground against the rocky coastline of Newfoundland, Canada.

Preparations

Henri Beaudout soon set to work planning and preparing a second attempt. He decided to use Halifax, Nova Scotia, as the point of departure. He formed a team, which included Gaston Vanackere, who had sailed on the first voyage, and Marc Modena (es) who, having heard about the voyage and fate of L’Égaré I, volunteered for the second voyage. Henri Beaudout took the role of skipper and navigator, Gaston Vanackere that of photographer and cinematographer, and Marc Modena, radio operator and cook.

Travelling to Nova Scotia in December, 1955, Beaudout was able to secure space to build the raft from John Patterson, the chief superintendent of the Halifax Shipyard Co., Ltd. Returning to Halifax in March, 1956, the crew began construction of the raft in open air at a Dartmouth marine yard (what is today King's Wharf in Dartmouth, NS), often working under snowfall and freezing temperatures. They were able to obtain from a local timber merchant nine seasoned red cedar logs, 18 inches in diameter. Once constructed, the raft measured 30 by 17 feet, held together using manila rope and covered by transverse beams. The rope was counter-sunk to prevent chafing. Not a nail was used in the construction of the raft. A canvas-covered cabin was built atop measuring 10 by 6 feet. A mast stood 27 feet high, on which a 19 by 14 foot canvas sail was fastened.

To cover the cost of building and supplying the raft (approximately Cdn $5000), members of the crew pooled their funds. They obtained a radio transmitter, navigation charts, wind gauge, barometer, watch, sextant, photography and 16 mm film equipment. To avoid the risk of losing fresh drinking water, they bought 100 one-pint tins, which were filled and sealed at a local molasses factory with water that had been sterilized at a Halifax dairy.

At the beginning of April, the crew met RoseMarie Comeau, an employee at a local telephone company. Speaking both English and French, she became the official secretary and translator for the L’Égaré II expedition. She was instrumental in helping the crew obtain supplies beyond the shipyard and assistance in communicating with local media. She was eventually chosen to christen the raft.

Voyage

On May 24, 1956, the crew cast off. Cyril Henneberry, skipper of a small fishing boat named Promise from nearby Sambro, NS, offered to tow the raft out to sea, beyond sight of the coastline. Having crossed the Atlantic Ocean between 45° and 50° north latitude, the crew reached Falmouth, England, on August 21, 1956.
