= Die ägyptische Helena =

Opera in two acts by Richard Strauss

- Opera by Richard Strauss
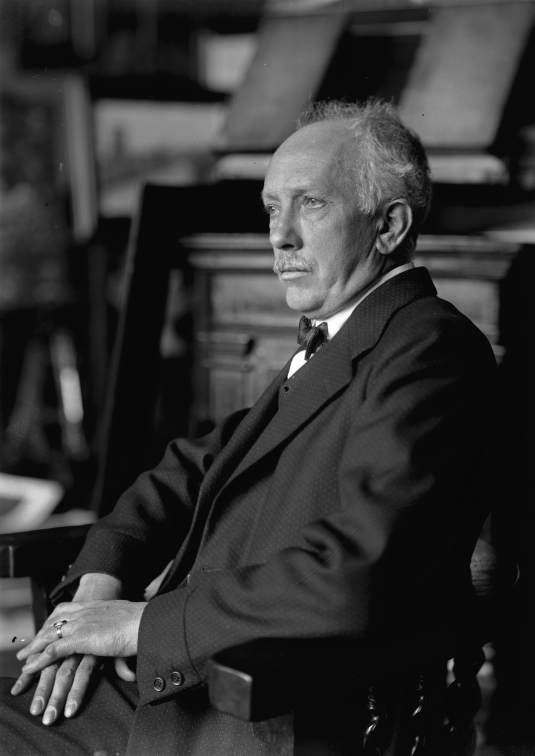
- The composer in 1922 (Photographer: Ferdinand Schmutzer)
- Librettist: Hugo von Hofmannsthal
- Language: German
- Based on: Helen by Euripides
- Premiere: 6 June 1928; Semperoper, Dresden

Die ägyptische Helena (The Egyptian Helen), Op. 75, is an opera in two acts by Richard Strauss to a German libretto by Hugo von Hofmannsthal. It premiered at the Dresden Semperoper on 6 June 1928. Strauss had written the title role with Maria Jeritza in mind but, creating quite a sensation at the time, the Dresden opera management refused to pay Jeritza's large fee and cast Elisabeth Rethberg instead as Helen of Troy. Jeritza eventually created the part in Vienna and New York City.

As inspiration for the story, Hofmannsthal used sources from Euripides (Helen). Strauss made changes to the opera in 1933, five years after the premiere, working with the director Lothar Wallenstein and the conductor Clemens Krauss.

== Roles ==
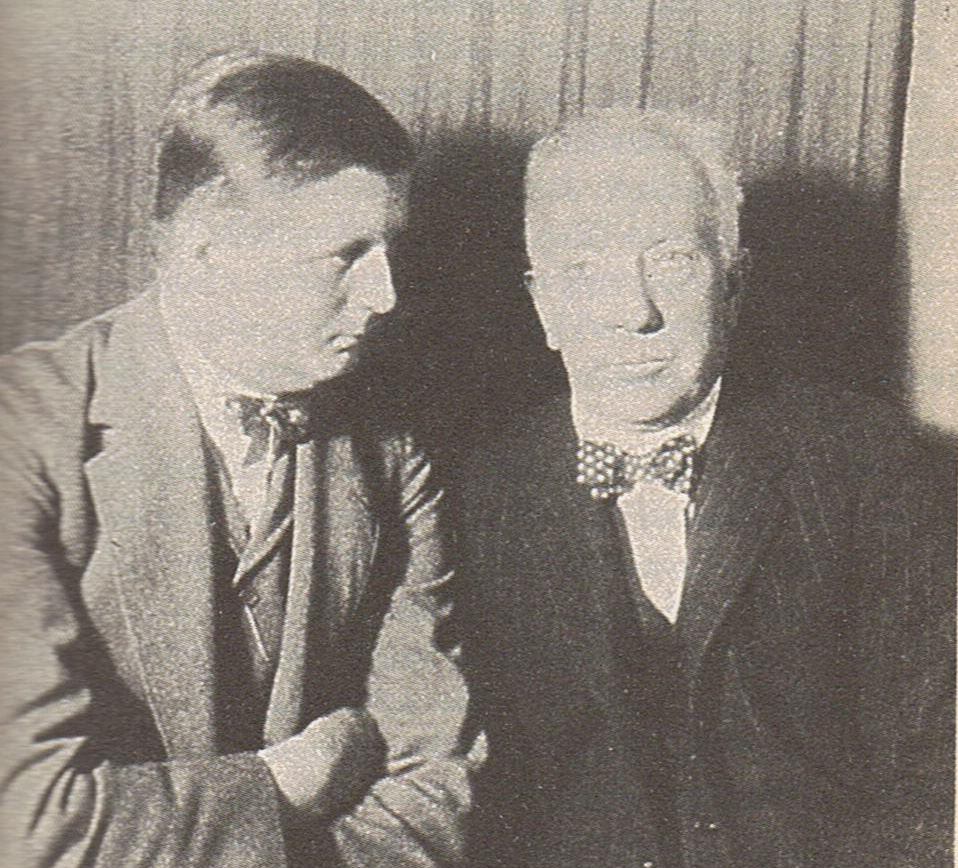
Strauss and Busch 1928

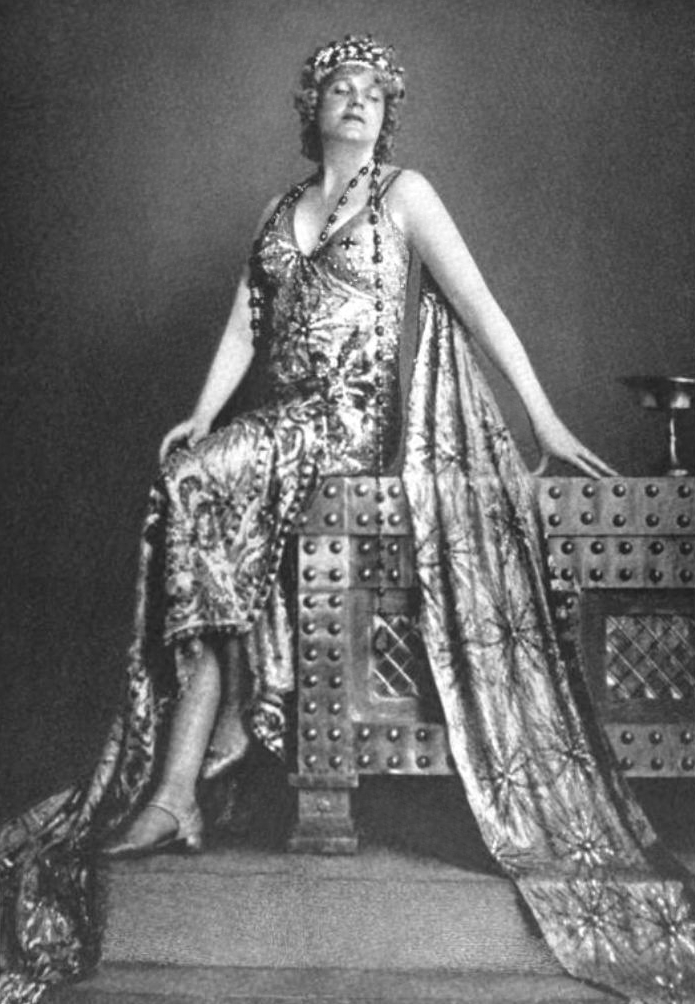
Maria Jeritza as Helena in 1929

Toles, voice types, premiere cast
Role	Voice type	Premiere cast, 6 June 1928 Conductor: Fritz Busch
Helena, wife of Menelaus	soprano	Elisabeth Rethberg
Menelaus	tenor	Curt Taucher
Hermione, their child	soprano	Anneliese Petrich
Aithra, the daughter of an Egyptian King: a sorceress	soprano	Maria Rajdl
Altair	baritone	Friedrich Plaschke
Da-Ud, his son	tenor	Guglielmo Fazzini
Two Servants of Aithra	soprano, mezzo-soprano	Erna Berger, Sigrid Rothermel
Four elves	two sopranos, two contraltos	Angela Kolniak, Eva Johnn, Elfriede Haberkorn, Sigrid Rothermel
Omniscient sea-shell	contralto	Helene Jung

It remains the only major opera in the repertory with a role for an omniscient sea-shell.

== Synopsis ==
=== Act 1 ===
The mythological past

In her island palace, the sorceress Aithra waits in vain for Poseidon's return. The oracle-like Omniscient Mussel tells her that though Poseidon is far away, he remains steadfast in his love for her. The Mussel then tells of a ship on which the most beautiful woman in the world, Helena (Helen of Troy), is about to be murdered by her husband, Menelas (Menelaus). To save the woman, Aithra conjures a flash storm to shipwreck the passengers, who soon make their way ashore and appear at the palace. Helena has been trying to save her marriage, but Menelas cannot forgive her for her betrayal with Paris at the start of the Trojan War. Bitterly, he has prevented their daughter, Hermione, from knowing her own mother. On land, Menelas once again plans to stab his wife, but the sight of her beauty by moonlight makes him hesitate. To ensure that he doesn't kill her, Aithra invokes elves to torment him; they make him believe that his rival, Paris, is present, and he rushes out to confront the specter. Aithra's magic then helps Helena regain her original youthful beauty, and a lotus drink banishes her anxiety. Servant girls take her to another room.

When Menelas stumbles back in, raving about having surprised and killed Helena and Paris, Aithra gives him the soothing drink as well. Hearing of his conflicted emotions toward his wife, the sorceress tries to tell him that nine years before, when he lost Helena to Paris, the gods actually substituted a wraith to fool Paris; the real Helena was hidden in the castle of Aithra's father on the slopes of the Atlas Mountains. There she remains, asleep, waiting for her husband to wake her; the woman in the next room is the wraith. Aithra pledges to transport Menelas by magic to the castle. Bewildered and hesitant, he gradually yields to the notion that the original Helena will be restored to him. In a pavilion at the foot of the mountain, the two can be reunited. Aithra suggests he use the lotus potion to keep disturbing memories at bay.

=== Act 2 ===
In the pavilion, Helena awakens and hails the couple's second wedding night ("Zweite Brautnacht"). Menelas, also awakening, still mistrusts his senses. His wife tries to soothe him with more lotus juice, but he catches sight of his sword, which revives jarring memories. Is this woman real or an illusion? Desert horsemen appear, and Altair, prince of the mountains, bows before Helena, offering gifts; his son Da-ud joins in praising her beauty. The scene reminds Menelas of a Trojan celebration in honor of Helena, but he tries to conceal his jealousy as Altair and Da-ud invite him to join a hunting party. Bidding farewell to Helena, and still uncertain of her identity, he leaves for the hunt. Aithra appears as one of the serving girls and cautions Helena that one of the vials she has packed contains a potion of forgetfulness but the other a potion of recollection. Against Aithra's strong advice Helena declares that recollection will be necessary to save her marriage; the fantasy of returning to an unblemished past is not a genuine solution.

At a sign from Helena, the maidservants withdraw when Altair returns, paying bold court to her and inviting her to a banquet in her honor. Even when word arrives that Menelas has killed Da-ud during the hunt, Altair continues his suit. He steps away, though, when the youth's body is brought in, followed by Menelas, who remains confused, thinking it is Paris he has killed. Again defying Aithra's counsel, Helena orders the potion of recollection prepared as time for the feast draws near. Menelas now imagines that the real Helena has died, and he resolves to join her in death; the Helena before him is surely the wraith. When he takes what he thinks is the potion of death, however, he sees the dead Helena as the living one: both are united. Altair and his cohorts seize and separate the couple, but Aithra reveals a phalanx of Poseidon's soldiers, who are escorting the child Hermione. Recognizing Aithra the sorceress, Altair bows to her power. Hermione, reunited at last with her parents, will go home with them to begin their life together.

== Instrumentation ==
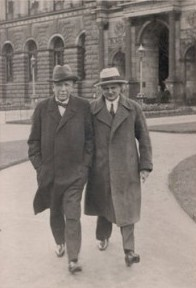
Strauss and Busch in Dresden, 1928

Although not dense like the orchestration for Elektra and Salome, it is still impressive:

- Woodwind: 4 flutes, piccolo, 2 oboes, English horn, 3 clarinets, bass clarinet, 3 bassoons, contrabassoon
- Brass: 6 horns, 6 trumpets, 3 trombones, tuba
- Percussion: timpani, bass drum, tam-tam (gong), snare drum, 1 pair of crash cymbals, suspended cymbal, glockenspiel
- Other instruments: celesta, 2 harps, organ, 16 1st violins, 14 2nd violins, 12 violas, 10 cellos, 8 double basses
- Stage band: 6 oboes, 6 clarinets, 4 horns, 2 trumpets, 4 trombones, timpani, 4 triangles, 2 tambourines, wind machine

== Recordings ==
There is a recording of a few excerpts made in 1928 with Fritz Busch conducting the Berlin State Opera Orchestra with Rose Pauly singing Helena. Two of these ("Bei jener Nacht" and "Zweite Brautnacht") are included in the Preiser Records collection Richard Strauss Opera Scenes – Historical Recordings 1928–43 released in 2000. Recordings of the complete opera include:

Year	Cast (Helena, Menelaus, Aithra, Altair)	Conductor, Opera house and orchestra	Label
1956	Leonie Rysanek, Bernd Aldenhoff, Annelies Kupper, Hermann Uhde	Joseph Keilberth, Bavarian State Opera Orchestra and Chorus	CD: Opera d'Oro; Cat: OPD 1381
1970	Gwyneth Jones, Jess Thomas, Mimi Coertse, Peter Glossop	Josef Krips; Vienna Philharmonic and Vienna State Opera Chorus (Recording of a performance given at the Vienna State Opera, 5 December)	CD: RCA; Cat: 74321 69429-2
1979	Gwyneth Jones, Matti Kastu, Barbara Hendricks, Willard White	Antal Doráti, Detroit Symphony Orchestra and the Kenneth Jewell Chorale	CD: Decca (London); Cat: 430 381-2
2001	Vitalija Blinstrubyte, Stephen O'Mara, Giulia Mattana, Johannes von Duisburg	Gérard Korsten, Teatro Lirico di Cagliari Orchestra and Chorus	CD: Dynamic; Cat: CDS 374/1-2
2002	Deborah Voigt, Carl Tanner, Celena Shafer, Christopher Robertson	Leon Botstein, American Symphony Orchestra and the New York Concert Chorale (Recording of a concert performance in the Avery Fisher Hall,6 October)	CD: Telarc; Cat: CD 80605
