= Dramatic soprano =

Type of classical singing voice

A dramatic soprano is a type of operatic soprano with a powerful, rich, emotive voice that can sing over, or cut through, a full orchestra. Thicker vocal folds in dramatic voices usually (but not always) mean less agility than lighter voices but a sustained, fuller sound. Usually this voice has a lower tessitura than other sopranos, and a darker timbre. They are often used for heroic, often long-suffering, tragic women of opera. Dramatic sopranos have a range from approximately low A (A_{3}) to "high C" (C_{6}). Some dramatic sopranos, known as Wagnerian sopranos or High dramatic sopranos (high in this case referring to the maturity of the voice, rather than the tessitura or range), have an exceptionally big voice that can assert itself over a large orchestra (of more than 80 or even 100 players). These voices are substantial, often denser in tone, extremely powerful and, ideally, evenly balanced throughout the vocal registers. Wagnerian sopranos usually play mythic heroines. Successful Wagnerian sopranos are rare and often Wagnerian roles are performed by Italianate dramatic sopranos.

== Dramatic roles ==
The following dramatic roles are for dramatic sopranos:

- Amelia, Un ballo in maschera (Verdi)
- Arabella, Arabella (Richard Strauss)
- Ariadne, Ariadne auf Naxos (Richard Strauss)
- Cassandre, Les Troyens (Berlioz)
- Chrysothemis, Elektra (Richard Strauss)
- Elisabeth, Tannhäuser (Wagner)
- Elsa, Lohengrin (Wagner)
- Fata Morgana, The Love for Three Oranges (Prokofiev)
- Gioconda, La Gioconda (Ponchielli)
- Giulietta, Tales of Hoffmann (Offenbach)
- Helena, Die ägyptische Helena (Richard Strauss)
- Die Kaiserin, Die Frau ohne Schatten (Richard Strauss)
- Leonore/Fidelio, Fidelio (Beethoven)
- Maddalena, Andrea Chénier (Giordano)
- Marie, Wozzeck (Alban Berg)
- Minnie, La fanciulla del West (Puccini)
- Norma, Norma (Bellini)
- Odabella, Attila (Verdi)
- Queen of Hearts, Alice in Wonderland (Unsuk Chin)
- Salome, Salome (Richard Strauss)
- Santuzza, Cavalleria rusticana (Mascagni)
- Sélika, L'Africaine (Giacomo Meyerbeer)
- Sieglinde, Die Walküre (Wagner)
- Turandot, Turandot (Puccini)
- Valentine, Les Huguenots (Giacomo Meyerbeer)
- Vanessa, Vanessa (Samuel Barber)

== High dramatic soprano roles ==
The following roles are for suitable for High dramatic/Wagnerian sopranos:

- Brünnhilde, Die Walküre, Siegfried, Götterdämmerung (Wagner)
- Elektra, Elektra (Richard Strauss)
- Isolde, Tristan und Isolde (Wagner)
- The Wife, Die Frau ohne Schatten (Richard Strauss)
- Senta, Der fliegende Holländer (Wagner)
- Kundry, Parsifal (Wagner)
- Ortrud, Lohengrin (Wagner)

== See also ==
- Coloratura soprano
- Lyric soprano
- Soubrette
- Spinto soprano
