= Guy Delage =

French swimmer

Guy Delage claims he is the first person to swim solo across the Atlantic Ocean (with the help of a kick board, from the Cape Verde Islands to Barbados). 16 December 1994. Logging six to eight hours a day behind a 15-foot (4.6 m) raft that carried his communications gear and food supply, Delage ate and slept on the craft when not in the water. After 55 days he had covered 2,100 nmi (3,900 km).

== Doubts about accomplishment ==
Delage's swim was not supervised. The New York Times published an article expressing several concerns that had been voiced:

- The possibility that, since he was unsupervised, he was lying about some aspect of his accomplishment.
- When not swimming, he slept on a raft which, all by itself, would have carried him across the ocean due to currents. The more he slept, the less distance he would have swum. There is no way to verify his log's claims about hours swimming.
- Since Delage could not have towed the raft, it must have had a sail or other propulsion. French newspapers observed that the raft could have been towing him.

== See also ==
- Benoît Lecomte who claims to be the first person to swim across the Atlantic without a kick board
