= Spinto soprano =

Type of operatic soprano

A spinto soprano is a type of operatic soprano voice that has the limpidity and easy high notes of a lyric soprano, yet can be "pushed" on to achieve dramatic climaxes without strain. This type of voice may also possess a somewhat darker timbre than the average lyric.

Spinto sopranos are also expected to handle dynamic changes in the music that they are performing with skill and poise. They command a vocal range extending from approximately low B (B_{3}) to in alt D (D_{6}).

The spinto repertoire includes many roles written by Verdi, by the various verismo composers, and by Puccini. Some of these roles are extremely popular with opera audiences. Certain Wagnerian heroines such as Elsa, Elisabeth and Sieglinde are also sung by spinto sopranos. The fact that spinto sopranos are uncommon means that parts that are ideal for their voices are often performed by singers from other classifications, and more than a few lyric sopranos have damaged their voices singing heavier spinto roles. Spinto roles are often sung by lyric sopranos, despite calling for high sustained tessitura passages that compete with full orchestral sound, and the lighter lyric voice needs to exercise caution when moving to this heavier category.

The spinto tenor is the spinto soprano's male equivalent among operatic voice types.

== Spinto roles ==
- Arabella, Arabella (Strauss)
- Adriana, Adriana Lecouvreur (Cilea)
- Aida, Aida (Verdi)
- Alice Ford, Falstaff (Verdi)
- Amanda/Clitoria, Le Grand Macabre (Ligeti)
- Amelia, Un ballo in maschera, (Verdi)
- Angelica, Suor Angelica (Puccini)
- Chrysothemis, Elektra (Strauss)
- Cio-Cio-San, Madama Butterfly (Puccini)
- Desdemona, Otello (Verdi)
- Donna Anna, Don Giovanni (Mozart)
- Elisabetta, Don Carlos (Verdi)
- Fedora, Fedora (Giordano)
- Lady Billows, Albert Herring (Britten)
- Leonora, La forza del destino (Verdi)
- Liza, The Queen of Spades (Tchaikovsky)
- Manon, Manon Lescaut (Puccini)
- Margherita, Mefistofele (Boito)
- Maria/Amelia, Simon Boccanegra (Verdi)
- The Marschallin, Der Rosenkavalier (Richard Strauss)
- Minnie La fanciulla del West (Puccini)
- Rusalka, Rusalka (Dvořák)
- Floria Tosca, Tosca (Puccini)
- Santuzza, Cavalleria rusticana (Mascagni)
- Tatyana, Eugene Onegin (Tchaikovsky)
- Vitellia, La clemenza di Tito (Mozart)

== See also ==
- Spinto
- Soprano
- Dramatic soprano
