= Karl-Heinz Thiemann =

German singer and opera singer

Karl-Heinz Thiemann (born 1933 in Herbern (Ascheberg) near Münster, Westfalen), is a German operatic tenor.

== Career ==
=== Origin and education ===
Thiemann was born in Münsterland to a musical family. He worked as a railway official and first appeared as a soloist at various singing clubs. After a successful audition, he studied singing at the Dortmund Conservatory from 1956 to 1961, majoring in voice with Rudolf Watzke and at the Hochschule für Musik und Tanz Köln with Dietger Jakob. During his studies he sang the tenor part in Verdi's Requiem in Dortmund in a performance by students of the conservatory.

=== Early years ===
He had his first engagement at the Theater Koblenz. There he made his debut 1961 as Florestan in Fidelio. In his first season he sang there six roles: among others Alvaro in La forza del destino, Turiddu in Cavalleria rusticana, Rinuccio in Gianni Schicchi and Ernesto in Don Pasquale. In his second season in 1962/1963 he added Belmonte in Die Entführung aus dem Serail (1963), Max in Der Freischütz (1963) for the first time and the title role in Lohengrin for the first time (along with Edeltraud Blanke as Elsa von Brabant). As Max he was also a guest at the Eutiner Festspiele.

A further engagement followed from 1965 to 1968 as "Jugendlicher Heldentenor" at the Aalto Theatre. There he took over dramatic roles such as the title role in Andrea Chénier and Hugo von Ringstetten in Undine.

=== Staatstheater Nürnberg ===
In the 1965/66 season, Thiemann made a guest appearance in April 1966 for the first time as a substitute at the Staatstheater Nürnberg, as Hoffmann in the opera The Tales of Hoffmann. Thereupon he was engaged by music director, Hans Gierster as guest for the title role in Don Carlos (1966, with Janis Martin as Princess Eboli) to the opera house Nuremberg. From the 1968/69 season, Thiemann was a permanent member of the Nuremberg Opera House until his retirement at the end of the 1997/98 season. There, he was one of the "pillars of the house" for decades. Thiemann's first role in Nuremberg was the title role in Otello (premiere: December 1968, with Catarina Ligendza as Desdemona). Later he sang this role again in another new production of Otello in Nuremberg . (Premiere: April 1978; director: Hansjörg Utzerath with Ursula Wendt-Walther as Desdemona).

In 1970 he appeared in Nuremberg for the first time in the role of Max in Der Freischütz (director: Hans-Peter Lehmann). In a production by Peter Beauvais, he took on the role of Max again in a new production at the Nuremberg Opera in 1980 (premiere: April 1980; conductor: Hans Gierster.) In September 1971 he sang Herod in Salome for the first time in Nuremberg (among others with Claudia Hellmann and Astrid Varnay as Herodias). Further roles of Thiemann in the 1970s were the Emperor in Die Frau ohne Schatten (1973; director: Hans-Peter Lehmann, conductor: Hans Gierster, with Astrid Varnay as Amme), Dimitri in Boris Godunov (1973/74 season; with Dunja Vejzović as Marina and Astrid Varnay as Schenkwirtin), Hermann in The Queen of Spades (Premiere: October 1975; director: Werner Düggelin; musical direction: Hans Gierster), the Prince in Rusalka (Premiere: December 1975; director: Bohumil Herlischka, conductor: Hans Gierster), Tichon in Káťa Kabanová (1977) and Wladimir in Prince Igor (1978).

=== Wagner roles ===
Thiemann was appointed to the Nuremberg Opera House after the retirement of Sebastian Feiersinger (1975), often used as Wagnerian tenor. At the Nuremberg Opera House he was regarded for decades as the "epitome of the Wagner singer".

In the 1970/71 season he sang Lohengrin for the first time at the Nuremberg Opera House, in a production by Hans-Peter Lehmann; he also took on this role in the revival in July 1980. In the 1989/90 season he sang Lohengrin again in a new production by Ernst Klusen, in a cast alongside Thomas Sunnegardh. In May 1991 he appeared for the last time as Lohengrin. In May 1971 Thiemann first sang the role of Walter von Stolzing in Die Meistersinger von Nürnberg at the Nuremberg Opera House (director: Hans-Peter Lehmann; revival 1981). From 1986 to 1989 he again sang the role of Stolzing (in a new production by Heinz Lukas-Kindermann; premiere: November 1986). He last sang Stolzing in May 1989.

In December 1977 he first sang Erik in The Flying Dutchman (conductor: Hans Gierster; director: Luca Ronconi; on his first directing debut in Germany). He later took over the role of Erik again in the 1992/1993 season, from April 1993 in the title role alongside Bent Norup, and in the revivals in 1994 and 1996. In April 1994 he also sang Erik in the farewell performance of Nuremberg soprano Ursula Wendt-Walther. In July 1996 he last appeared as Erik.

In 1978 he sang the role of Loge in Das Rheingold (premiere July 1978; director Hansgünther Heyme, conductor Hans Gierster) in the Nuremberg Ring Cycle, which was abandoned for cost reasons. In February 1983 he first sang the title role in Parsifal (director Gert Westphal; musical direction: Hans Gierster). In October 1983 he made his debut as Siegmund in Die Walküre (premiere October 1983; director: Gerhard Klingenberg; musical direction: Hans Gierster).

In the course of his career at the Nuremberg Opera, Thiemann later appeared in the heroic tenor roles in Wagner under the conductor Christian Thielemann: the title roles in Tannhäuser (premiere October 1990 until December 1991) and Tristan und Isolde (premiere March 1992; last in June 1993). During his time as general music director in Nuremberg, Thielemann used Thiemann in numerous major roles, especially in operas by Richard Wagner, Richard Strauss and Hans Pfitzner.

=== Commitment to modernity ===
Thiemann was particularly interested in the music of the 20th century. In the 1970/71 season (premiere December 1970) Thiemann sang Aron in Moses and Aron to favourable notices. In 1971 he sang Cardinal Albrecht von Brandenburg in Mathis der Maler (director: Hans-Peter Lehmann; premiere April 1971). In June 1974 followed Desportes in Die Soldaten (conductor Hans Gierster, director: Hans-Peter Lehmann). In April 1972 he took part in the Nuremberg premiere of the scenic oratorio of Henze's Das Floß der Medusa. In June 1975 he gave a guest performance in this production with the ensemble of the Nuremberg Opera as part of the Maggio Musicale Fiorentino in the Teatro Comunale di Firenze.

In October 1980 he performed the long and difficult part of Görge in the world premiere of Zemlinsky's opera Der Traumgörge. In 1982 he sang the role of Edmund in the Nuremberg premiere of the opera Lear (premiere: March 1982). Edmund "characterized Thiemann with cynically cutting tones". In December 1982, Oedipus followed in Oedipus Rex (premiere December 1982; with Gail Gilmore as Iokaste). In the Nuremberg premiere of the opera Baal (premiere June 1984) by Friedrich Cerha, he was heard as Fabrikant Mech. In 1985 he sang Jean in the Nuremberg premiere (January 1985, Nuremberg Kammerspiele) of the opera Fräulein Julie by Antonio Bibalo. In 1986 he assumed the title role in the premiere of Andreas Nick's opera Satyros (premiere June 1986; Nuremberg, Katharinenkirche, Nuremberg). In 1988 he was Hans (Gregor's brother) in the premiere of Walter Zimmermann's Über die Dörfer, next to Martha Mödl (Premiere June 1988).

=== Role debuts from 1980 ===
Further role debuts of Thiemann in the 1980s were among others Graf Elemer in Arabella (premiere December 1980; production: Hans Neugebauer, conductor Hans Gierster), Florestan (premiere December 1981, director: Hans Neugebauer; conductor Hans Gierster, alongside Gerlinde Lorenz and Johanna-Lotte Fecht as Leonore; in May 1984 in a gala performance with Jeannine Altmeyer and Gerd Feldhoff), Lord Arturo Bucklaw in Lucia di Lammermoor (staging by Gilbert Deflo; premiere April 1983; in June 1983 also in a gala performance at the opera house Nuremberg with José Carreras), Bacchus in Ariadne auf Naxos (director: Heinz Lukas-Kindermann; premiere May 1986; in June 1986 in a gala performance with Janis Martin), Aegisth in Elektra (director: Heinz Lukas-Kindermann; conductor Hans Gierster in his last Nuremberg opera premiere; premiere May 1987; revival in July 1988), Falsacappa in Les brigands (premiere: July 1987), the innkeeper in Der Rosenkavalier with Gwyneth Jones (director: Heinz-Lukas-Kindermann; conductor: Christian Thielemann; premiere: October 1987), the schoolmaster in The Cunning Little Vixen (director: Heinz Lukas-Kindermann; conductor: Wolfgang Gayler; Premiere: December 1987, until the end of the 1987/1988 season)..

In the 1988/89 season Thiemann sang the title role in Palestrina (premiere: October 1988; revival: April 1989; director: Hansjörg Utzerath; musical direction: Christian Thielemann).

Other roles included Agrippa von Nettesheim in The Fiery Angel (conductor: Eberhard Kloke; premiere: March 1994), Alfred in Die Fledermaus (premiere: December 1994; last in December 1997), the title role in Handel's oratorio Belshazzar (premiere June 1995, in the Stadttheater Fürth), and Koloman Zsupan in The Gypsy Baron (premiere: December 1996). He also sang this role in the New Year's Eve performance in December 1997. Thiemann's last new role as a permanent member of the ensemble in the 1997/98 season was Siegfried in the operetta Die lustigen Nibelungen, in a production of the Nuremberg Opera House at the Dehnberger Hoftheater; (director: Wulf Konold; Premiere: February 1998).

He also sang Canio in Pagliacci (March 1989-April 1990; conductor Christian Thielemann) and Eléazar in La Juive (June 1994–April 1996).

== Guest performances ==
From the mid-1960s Thiemann performed regularly at various opera houses in Germany and in numerous European music venues.

He appeared on the following stages among others: Hamburgische Staatsoper, the Deutsche Oper Berlin, the Berlin State Opera, the Deutsche Oper am Rhein, the Stuttgart State Opera and the Bavarian State Opera.

== Concert repertoire ==
Thiemann's singing career focused on opera, but he also regularly played concert roles.

His repertoire included: Symphony No. 9 (Beethoven) (Dortmund, Koblenz, Frankfurt am Main, most recently in January 1996 in Nuremberg), Das Lied von der Erde (April 1971 in Triest, with Maureen Forrester; conductor: Hans Gierster; Nuremberg) and Die Jakobsleiter (1975; Florence as part of the Maggio Musicale and Nuremberg; conductor: Hans Gierster).

1971 he sang in Nuremberg in the European premiere of the Kosmogonia for solos (soprano, tenor, bass), mixed choir and orchestra by Krzysztof Penderecki (with Sonja Poot, soprano; Kurt Moll, bass). In April 1998 he performed Schütz' Musikalische Exequien in a concert of the Hans-Sachs-Chor Nürnberg. In December 1998 he was soloist at a pre-Christmas concert in the St.Andreas-Kirche in Kalchreuth; in which he performed lieder by Richard Trunk and Peter Cornelius and other pieces.

== Retirement ==
Thiemann retired from the Nuremberg Ensemble at the end of the 1997/98 season in July 1998 due to his age. He was appointed an honorary member of the Nuremberg Opera House. Thiemann's long-standing commitment as chairman of the staff council and chairman of the Guild of the German Stage was also confirmed.

He then continued to appear as a guest at the Nuremberg Opera House: in the revival of the operetta Die lustigen Nibelungen in October 1998 (again at the Dehnberger Hoftheater), as a lieutenant in Doktor Faust (1998/1999 season, premiere: November 1998; until June 1999) and as Ulrich Eißlinger in Die Meistersinger von Nürnberg (premiere: April 2000; revival: June 2004). In July 2004 he performed that role, Ulrich Eißlinger, in his last appearance on the stage of the Nuremberg Opera House. Thiemann had his last public appearance as a singer at the Nuremberg Opera House in March 2006 as part of the series of events "Das rote Sofa" in the Gluck Hall of the Opera House; he sang the lied "Zueignung" by Richard Strauss with piano accompaniment.

Thiemann lives in Kalchreuth near Nuremberg.

== Recordings ==
In June 1971 Thiemann sang Herod in a concert performance in Rome in the opera Salome; his partners were Montserrat Caballé (title role) and Zubin Mehta (conductor). The recording was made by the Radiotelevisione Italiana and later released on CD.

The premiere of the opera Doktor Faustus, with Thiemann in the small role of Lieutenant, was broadcast in November 1998 on the radio programme of Bayerischer Rundfunk and broadcast live on Arte. In February 1999 Doctor Faustus was recorded by the Bayerischer Rundfunk and broadcast on Bayerisches Fernsehen.

There exist live recordings by Thiemann from the Nuremberg Opera House (Meistersinger, Parsifal, Tannhäuser, Tristan, Palestrina) as well as private recordings.
