= AJ Glueckert =

American operatic tenor

- Occupation: Operatic tenor
- Organizations: Oper Frankfurt
- Website: www.ajglueckert.com

AJ Glueckert is an American operatic tenor, based in Germany at the Oper Frankfurt. He has performed leading roles there, and also at major opera houses internationally, such as Wagner's Erik at the Metropolitan Opera and Puccini's Pinkerton at the Santa Fe Opera.

== Career ==
Glueckert was a member of the opera studio of the Santa Fe Opera. He made his debut in Europe at the Oper Frankfurt in 2014, as the Prince in Dvorak's Rusalka. He became a member of the ensemble with the 2016/17 season. Roles at the house have included Edrisi in Szymanovsky's Król Roger, Graf Vaudémont in Tchaikovsky's Iolanta, Lyonel in Flotow's Martha and Froh in Wagner's Das Rheingold. His appearance as Flamand in Capriccio by Richard Strauss, directed by Brigitte Fassbaender playing in Occupied France at the time of the opera's premiere in 1942, was described as "sung with passionate almost Heldentenor power".

Glueckert first performed at the Metropolitan Opera in New York City in the 2016/17 season, as Erik in Wagner's Der fliegende Holländer. Reviewer Anthony Tommasini from The New York Times described him as a "clarion, sensitive tenor". When he appeared at the Santa Fe Opera as Pinkerton in Puccini's Madama Butterfly alongside Kelly Kaduce in 2018, a reviewer wrote: "He was an ardent Pinkerton, appropriately smug in his opening aria, vocally expressive in the first act love duet with Butterfly, and affecting in his last act aria."

On 10 March 2022, he was the tenor soloist in the final movement of Beethoven's Ninth Symphony in a charity concert at the Alte Oper of Frankfurt performers for Ukraine, with the hr-Sinfonieorchester conducted by Juraj Valčuha.

In 2024 he performed the title role of Zemlinsky's Der Traumgörge at the Oper Frankfurt, directed by Tilmann Köhler and conducted by Markus Poschner, with Zuzana Marková in the title role, Magdalena Hinterdobler as Grete and Liviu Holender as Hans.
