= Zuzana Marková (soprano) =

Czech coloratura soprano (born 1988)

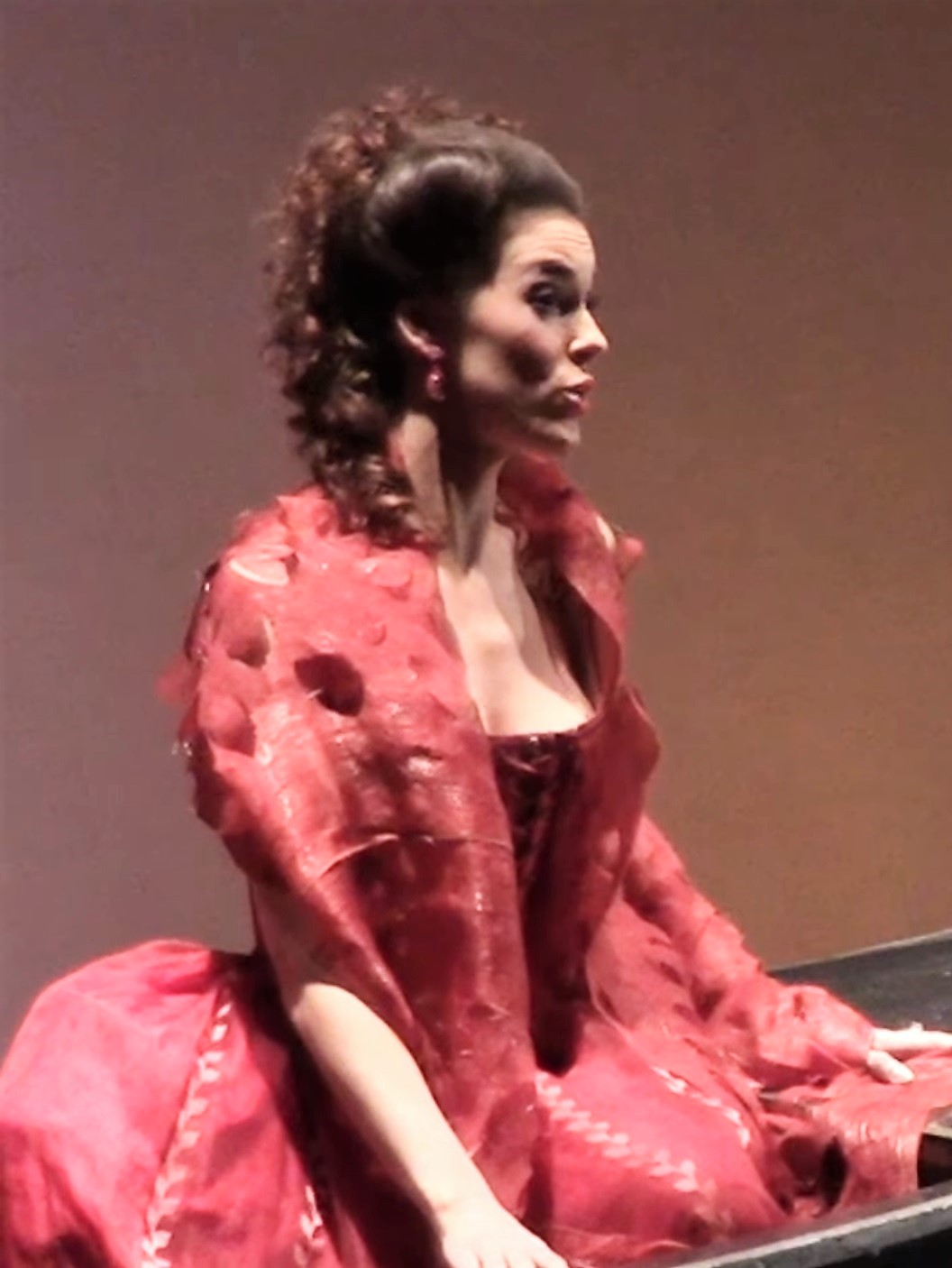
- Marková in Aspern by Salvatore Sciarrino in 2013
- Born: 1988 (age 36–37)
- Education: Prague Conservatory
- Occupation: Operatic soprano

Zuzana Marková (born 1988) is a Czech coloratura soprano who appears in leading roles internationally, with a focus on Italian belcanto roles, such as Donizetti's Lucia di Lammermoor and Bellini's Elvira.

== Training ==
Born in Prague, Marková studied at the Prague Conservatory—voice with her mother Jiřina Marková, piano with Miroslav Langer, and conducting with Miriam Němcová and Hynek Farkač. She participated in master classes with Mietta Sighele and Veriano Luchetti in Riva del Garda, Italy. She further studied with Paola Pittaluga from the Teatro Comunale di Bologna in 2010 and 2011.

== Career ==
In 2003, Marková won the "Prague Singer" competition, and won second prize in the "Dušek's Singing Competition" in Prague. In 2012, she won second prize at the Ernst Häfliger International Singing Competition in Switzerland. Marková made her opera debut at the age of sixteen, performing as Frantiska in Emil František Burian's Opera z pouti at the National Moravian-Silesian Theatre in Ostrava, in the Czech Republic.

She has performed leading roles in Italian belcanto opera, including the title role of Donizetti's Lucia di Lammermoor in Genoa and Venice. In 2014, she stepped into the role of Lucia at the last moment in Frédéric Bélier-Garcia's production at the Opéra de Marseille when Eglise Gutiérrez became ill. Marková's performance was described as literally dazzling (littéralement éblouissante) and her interpretation throughout the performance was acclaimed for its depth of understanding (une Lucia qui ne cesse de sidérer par ce que l’interprète semble avoir compris et du rôle et d’elle-même).

She has appeared in the title role Violetta of Verdi's La traviata at the Teatro Comunale, Florence, the Bolshoi Theatre in Moscow, and the Teatro Massimo in Palermo. She performed the role of Elena in Nino Rota's Il cappello di paglia di Firenze at the Naples Teatro di San Carlo. She appeared as Ismene in Gluck's Alceste at La Fenice in Venice in 2015.

In French opera, she was Massenet's Manon at the Cologne Opera in 2018. A reviewer wrote that she was ideal for the role, noting the brilliance but also intimacy of her perfectly controlled voice, and her convincing acting. Another reviewer called her a dream cast (Traumbesetzung) for the role, both vocally and in acting.

She made her Oper Frankfurt debut in the 2018/19 season as Elvira in Bellini's last opera I puritani, staged by Vincent Boussard in cooperation with the Opéra Royal de Wallonie in Liège, alongside John Osborn. She made her US debut as Violetta in Verdi's La Traviata at the Atlanta Opera in April 2019. In 2024, she performed the double role of the Princess and Gertraud in Zemlinsky's Der Traumgörge at the Oper Frankfurt, directed by Tilmann Köhler and conducted by Markus Poschner, with AJ Glueckert in the title role, Magdalena Hinterdobler as Grete and Liviu Holender as Hans.

Her repertoire also includes Donna Anna in Mozart's Don Giovanni, the title role of Donizetti's Anna Bolena, Oscar in Verdi's Un ballo in maschera, Ines in Meyerbeer's L'Africaine, Micaëla in Bizet's Carmen, and the title role in Henri Sauguet's Les caprices de Marianne. She also works as a concert singer.
