= 1950 in jazz =

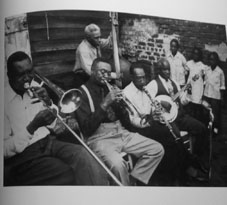
- The George Lewis Ragtime Jazz Band in New Orleans, 1950
- Decade: 1950s in jazz
- Music: 1950 in music
- Standards: List of post-1950 jazz standards
- See also: 1949 in jazz – 1951 in jazz

This is a timeline documenting events of Jazz in the year 1950.

== Events ==
- The owner of Café Society and Café Society Uptown, Barney Josephson, closed both locations after his brother, Leon Josephson, was found guilty of Contempt of Congress and the following bad press that linked Barney and Café Society to the Communist Party in the United States.
- Dizzy Gillespie visited Clifford Brown at the hospital during his year long recovery after an automobile accident that almost killed him, and urges him to move forward with his musical career as a trumpeter.

== Album releases ==
- Miles Davis: Birth of the Cool
- Stan Kenton: Presents
- Ralph Sutton: Ralph Sutton
- Lennie Tristano: Wow
- Stan Getz: Quartets

== Deaths ==
May

- 2 – Leo Watson, American jazz vocalese singer, drummer, trombonist and tipple player (born 1898).
- 6 – Chelsea Quealey, American jazz trumpeter (born 1905).

July

- 6 – Fats Navarro, American jazz trumpet player (born 1923).
- 26 – Freddy Gardner, British saxophonist (born 1910).

August

- 1 – Alvin Burroughs, American swing jazz drummer (born 1911).

September

- 5 – Al Killian, American jazz trumpeter and occasional bandleader (born 1916).
- 15 – Dol Dauber, Czech violinist, bandleader, composer, and music arranger (born 1894).

October

- 23 – Al Jolson, American singer, comedian and actor (born 1886).

Unknown date

- Lou Gold, Polish-American composer, pianist and band leader (born 1885).
- Ray Perry, American jazz violinist and saxophonist (born 1915).

== Births ==
January

- 4 – Robert Dick, American flutist, composer, and author.
- 5 – Art Baron, American trombonist.
- 6 – Safy Boutella, American bass guitar and synthesizer player.

February

- 5 – Natalie Cole, American singer and songwriter (died 2015).
- 18 – Cybill Shepherd, American actress and singer.
- 20 – Walter Becker, American musician, songwriter and record producer (died 2017).
- 23 – John Greaves, British bass guitarist and composer, Henry Cow.

March

- 11 – Bobby McFerrin, American vocalist and conductor.
- 19
  - Curtis Fowlkes, American trombonist and singer.
  - Steve Houben, Belgian saxophonist and flutist.
- 20 – Fapy Lafertin, Belgian guitarist.
- 25 – Chuck Greenberg, American musician, composer, and producer (died 1995).
- 30 – John D'earth, American trumpeter.

April

- 4
  - Ndingo Johwa, Botswanan trumpeter, flugelhornist, cornetist, guitarist, singer, and composer.
  - Pip Pyle, English-born drummer (died 2006).
- 17 – Jean-Jacques Milteau, French harmonica player, singer, and songwriter.
- 19 – Earl Gardner, American trumpeter.
- 23 – Curtis Clark, American pianist
- 25 – Bobbi Humphrey, American flautist and singer.
- 28 – Willie Colón, American salsa musician.

May

- 2 – François Couturier, French pianist.
- 3 – Dag Arnesen, Norwegian pianist and composer.
- 12 – Ronnie Foster, American organist and record producer.
- 16 – Pete Jacobsen, English pianist (died 2002).
- 20 – Victor Lewis, American drummer.
- 27 – Dee Dee Bridgewater, American singer.

June

- 4 – Dagmar Krause, German singer, Henry Cow.
- 23 – Luther Thomas, American alto saxophonist and multi-instrumentalist (died 2009).
- 27 – Glenn Ferris, American trombonist.
- 28
  - David Lanz, American pianist.
  - Guttorm Guttormsen, Norwegian flautist and orchestra leader.

July

- 4 – Karl Ratzer, Austrian guitarist.
- 15 – Tony Esposito, Italian drummer and percussionist.
- 16 – Dee Bell, American singer.
- 17 – Phoebe Snow, American singer, songwriter, and guitarist (died 2011).
- 28 – Hal Crook, American trombonist.

August

- 6 – John Pål Inderberg, Norwegian saxophonist and composer.
- 16 – Alvin Queen, American-Swiss drummer.
- 25 – Charles Fambrough, American bassist, composer, and record producer (died 2011).
- 26 – Fred Lonzo, American trombonist

September

- 14
  - Giacomo Gates, American singer.
  - Paul Kossoff, English guitarist, Free (died 1976).
- 15 – Anthony Lacen, American tubist and band leader (died 2004).
- 21
  - Gail Varina Gilmore, African-American singer.
- 23 – George Garzone, American saxophonist and jazz educator.
- 27 – Linda Lewis, English vocalist, songwriter, and guitarist.

October

- 1 – Mark Helias, American upright bassist and composer.
- 3 – Ronnie Laws, American saxophonist.
- 8 – Robert Bell, American singer-songwriter and musician.
- 14 – Charlie Kosei, Japanese musician.

November

- 2 – Stephen Nachmanovitch, American violinist, author, computer artist, and educator.
- 6 – Gil Goldstein, American pianist and synthesizer player.
- 29 – Pocho La Pantera, Argentine cumbia singer (died 2016).

December

- 1 – Armen Donelian, American pianist, composer, educator and author.
- 4 – Bjørn Kjellemyr, Norwegian upright bassist.
- 5 – Sveinung Hovensjø, Norwegian bassist.
- 12 – Richard Galliano, French accordionist.
- 15 – Stjepko Gut, Serbian musician.
- 23 – Cyro Baptista, Brazilian musician.
- 29 – Robert Popwell, American bass guitarist (died 2017).
- 30 – Mont Campbell, British multi-instrumentalist and composer.

Unknown date

- Marvin Goldstein, American pianist.
- Vincent Chancey, American hornist.

== See also ==
- 1950s in jazz
- List of years in jazz
- 1950 in music

== Bibliography ==
- The New Real Book, Volume I. Sher Music. 1988. ISBN 0-9614701-4-3.
- The New Real Book, Volume II. Sher Music. 1991. ISBN 0-9614701-7-8.
- The New Real Book, Volume III. Sher Music. 1995. ISBN 1-883217-30-X.
- The Real Book, Volume I (6th ed.). Hal Leonard. 2004. ISBN 0-634-06038-4.
- The Real Book, Volume II (2nd ed.). Hal Leonard. 2007. ISBN 978-1-4234-2452-9.
- The Real Book, Volume III (2nd ed.). Hal Leonard. 2006. ISBN 0-634-06136-4.
- The Real Jazz Book. Warner Bros. ISBN 978-91-85041-36-7.
- The Real Vocal Book, Volume I. Hal Leonard. 2006. ISBN 0-634-06080-5.
