= Hakan Savaş Mican =

- Born: 1978 (age 47–48); Berlin, West Germany
- Occupations: Film director, screenwriter, producer
- Years active: 2008–present

Hakan Savaş Mican (born 1978) is a German-Turkish filmmaker, playwright and director.

== Biography ==
Hakan Savaş Mican was born in Berlin in 1978 as the son of Turkish immigrants, but grew up with his grandmother in Turkey. After passing the Turkish Abitur in Ankara in 1995, he moved back to Berlin in 1997 to study architecture, graduating in 2004. He then went on to study directing at the German Film and Television Academy in Berlin (dffb).

After completing his studies, Mican made several short films, one of which (Fremd.Yaban, 2007) received some praise. His 30-minute feature film Adems Sohn, which ran on German television in 2008, was previewed at the 13th Turkey/Germany Film Festival in Nuremberg.

In 2009, he completed the play Die Schwäne vom Schlachthof ("The Swans of the Slaughterhouse"), which retells "stories of Turkish-Germans who were entangled in the East-West divide in some form". Mican also wrote and directed plays for the theater such as Der Besuch/Ziyaret (2009), a Ballhaus Naunynstraße production that was presented at the German-Turkish theater and film festival Beyond Belonging – Almancı! ran in Istanbul in June 2009 and Schnee (2010), also a Ballhaus-Naunynstraße production loosely based on motifs from the novel of the same name by Orhan Pamuk. He also staged for the Berlin Maxim Gorki Theater, with plays such as Marianna Salzmann's Beg your pardon und Schwimmen lernen – ein Lovesong. With this piece he was invited to the festival of young directors Radikal jung at the Münchner Volkstheater and the Theater & Orchester Heidelberg in 2014, where he staged Kasimir und Karoline in the same year.

Mican calls the style of his productions unspectacular, down-to-earth and says he doesn't work with actors, but with people whose individuality he integrates into the theater characters.

== Filmography ==
- Drei Annäherungen, short film, 2005
- Muttermal, short film, 2006
- Fremd.Yaban, short film, 2007
- Adems Sohn, motion picture, 2008
