= Bent Norup =

Danish operatic baritone (1936–2007)

- Born: 7 November 1936; Hobro, Denmark
- Died: 7 May 2007 (aged 70); Udsholt Strand, Blistrup, Denmark
- Occupation: Operatic baritone
- Organizations: Royal Danish Theatre; Staatstheater Braunschweig; Staatstheater Nürnberg
- Awards: Order of the Dannebrog

Bent Norup (7 November 1936 – 7 May 2007) was a Danish operatic heldenbaritone. He was a member of the Royal Danish Theatre and opera houses in Germany, and appeared internationally, especially in stage works by Richard Wagner, including his signature role Hans Sachs in Die Meistersinger von Nürnberg. He also performed in contemporary opera and in concert. He was appointed a knight of the Order of the Dannebrog.

== Life ==
Norup was born in Hobro, Denmark. During his bank apprenticeship in Copenhagen, Norup took private singing lessons. He then trained his voice with Karl Schmitt-Walter in Munich and Herta Sperber in New York City. After singing in the choir at the Royal Danish Theatre in Copenhagen, he made his debut as a soloist there in 1969, as Shchelkalov in Mussorgsky's Boris Godunov. He remained at the house until 1975, appearing in major roles such as Kurwenal in Wagner's Tristan und Isolde and in the title role of his Der fliegende Holländer, as the Doctor in Alban Berg's Wozzeck, as Stig in Peter Arnold Heise's Drot og marsk, and as Jochanaan in Salome by Richard Strauss. He participated in the world premiere of Herman D. Koppel's Macbeth as Banquo on 1 February 1970.

Norup was a member of the German opera houses Staatstheater Braunschweig from 1972 and Staatstheater Nürnberg from 1977 to 1989, and was associated with the Staatsoper Hannover from 1981. As a guest, he appeared at many German opera houses, often in Wagner's stage works. He performed the role of Hans Sachs in Die Meistersinger von Nürnberg at the Musiktheater im Revier in Gelsenkirchen in 1979, which became his signature role. Norup was Der fliegende Holländer at the Vienna State Opera in 1985 and Telramund in Lohengrin at La Fenice in Venice in 1990 and the Liceu in Barcelona in 1992.

In 1983, he stepped in at the Bayreuth Festival for the sick Siegmund Nimsgern in the role of the Wanderer in Siegfried, conducted by Georg Solti. The same year, he also appeared there as Gunther in Götterdämmerung, but received rather restrained reviews.

Other roles as a dramatic baritone included Pizarro in Beethoven's Fidelio, Jago in Verdi's Otello, Mephisto in Gounod's Faust, Scarpia in Puccini's Tosca, the title role of Borodin's Prince Igor, Borromeo in Pfitzner's Palestrina and Boris in Shostakovitch's Katerina Izmailova.

In 1984, he recorded the role of Orest in Elektra by Richard Strauss in a live recording with the Orchestre national de France, conducted by Christof Perick, alongside Ute Vinzing as Elektra and Leonie Rysanek as Chrysothemis. He was also active as a concert singer. In 1994, he was appointed a knight of the Order of the Dannebrog for his accomplishments.

Norup died in Udsholt Strand, Blistrup, on 7 May 2007 at age 70.
