= Zwei Gesänge, Op. 1 (Schoenberg) =

Two Lieder by Arnold Schoenberg

Zwei Gesänge
- Lieder by Arnold Schoenberg
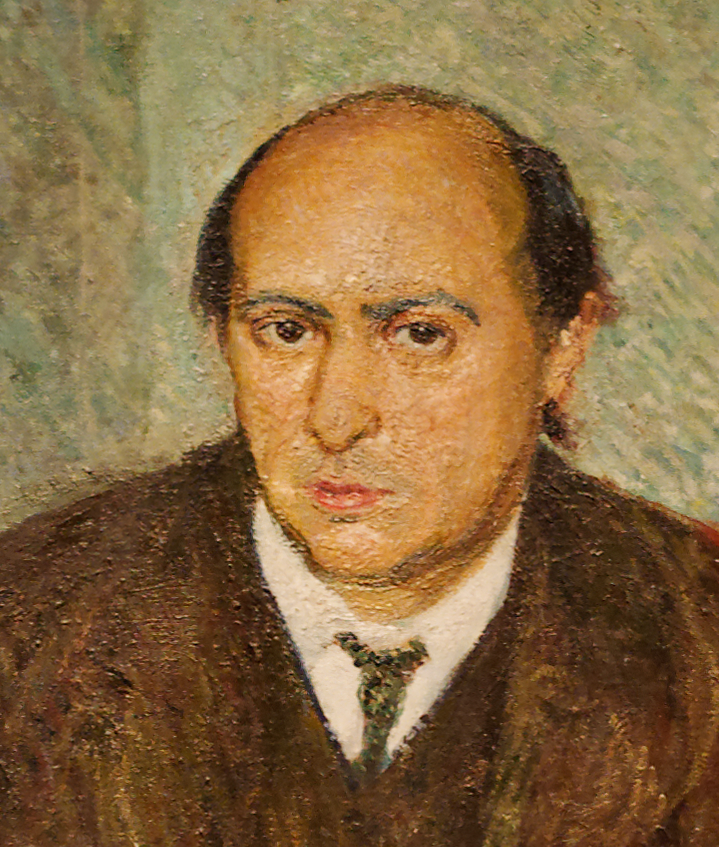
- Arnold Schönberg (1905)
- Opus: 1
- Text: "Dank" ("Thanks") in No. 1 and "Abschied" ("Farewell") in No. 2, both from Karl Michael von Levetzow's Höhenlieder: Gedichte und Aphorismen (High Songs: Poems and Aphorisms)
- Language: German
- Composed: 1898
- Dedication: Alexander von Zemlinsky
- Performed: 1 December 1900 Vienna
- Published: 1903 or 1904
- Duration: 16 minutes
- Scoring: baritone; piano

Zwei Gesänge (Two Songs), Op. 1, are two Lieder for baritone and piano composed by Arnold Schoenberg in fin-de-siècle Vienna, each setting to music a poem by Karl Michael von Levetzow. The songs approached the customary limits of the Lied genre in their length, depth of expression, density of texture, and transcription-like piano writing, foreshadowing Schoenberg's later innovations, notably in his monumental work, Gurre-Lieder. Like many of Schoenberg's early works, they reflect the dual influence of Johannes Brahms and Richard Wagner, two composers often considered opposites in Romantic music.

In 1900, Eduard Gärtner (baritone) and Alexander Zemlinsky (piano) premiered them at Vienna's Bösendorfer-Saal. Audience reception was negative, though Alma Mahler was present and gave a more balanced assessment. In 1903 or 1904, Max Marschalk published them in Berlin under the full title Zwei Gesänge für eine Baritonstimme und Klavier (Two Songs for a baritone voice and piano). Schoenberg dedicated them to Zemlinsky.

== History ==
In Zwei Gesänge, Schoenberg (Note: At the time, he was Arnold Schönberg. He transliterated his surname in the 1930s.) set poems from Karl Michael von Levetzow's Höhenlieder: Gedichte und Aphorismen, "Dank" ("Thanks") in the first song and "Abschied" ("Farewell") in the other. In July 1898, Levetzow had given Schoenberg a copy of this volume inscribed: "Dedicated kindly to Mr Arnold Schönberg with the best wishes for success".

The two had met that year, perhaps at a Café Glattauer poetry reading. They later worked in Kabarett together at Ernst von Wolzogen's Überbrettl, where Levetzow may have helped Schoenberg get hired as a conductor in 1901. Schoenberg asked Levetzow to be his daughter Gertrude's godfather in 1902.

=== Publication ===
In 1903 or 1904, Max Marschalk's Dreililien published the songs in a new version (with different keys) as Schoenberg's Op. 1. (Note: The Berlin firm, Schoenberg's first publisher until 1905, soon also published his already written Vier Lieder, Op. 2, and Sechs Lieder, Op. 3 (as well as, later, his Verklärte Nacht, Op. 4, Acht Lieder, Op. 6, and String Quartet No. 1, Op. 7). Universal Edition later acquired the rights to at least some of Schoenberg's early songs from Dreililien. Birnbach Musikverlag later acquired Dreililien in 1934.) Schoenberg dedicated them "to my teacher and friend, Alexander von Zemlinsky". (He dedicated many early works to Zemlinsky.)

=== Performances and recordings ===
The baritone Eduard Gärtner (Note: Eduard Gärtner was an esteemed Viennese singing teacher.) and pianist Zemlinsky premiered the songs in Vienna's Bösendorfer-Saal on 1 December 1900. Alma Mahler (then Alma Schindler) observed that the songs were

lavished with incredible pomp but without any concession to the ear that is accustomed to gentle melodies. Nightmarishly paralyzing ... disjointed. ... [without] a crescendo that reaches its climax tenderly. ... certainly not uninteresting – but beautiful.

Das Vaterland recorded the audience's hostile reaction. David Josef Bach recalled the audience "yelling and laughing, ... jeer[ing] at the composer like a fool", in a 1905 Arbeiter-Zeitung article about Schoenberg. The composer himself observed, "from that time ... the scandal has never ceased", according to Egon Wellesz's 1921 Schoenberg biography. (Note: Schoenberg later corrected the biography but left this passage unchanged.)

Donald Gramm and Glenn Gould recorded Zwei Gesänge on 1 May 1965 as part of Gould's collection of Schoenberg's piano music and Lieder. Dietrich Fischer-Dieskau and Aribert Reimann recorded the songs in January 1983. Liviu Holender and Lukas Rommelspacher performed them at the Oper Frankfurt on 17 April 2024, in the 150th anniversary year of Schoenberg's birth.

== Music ==
Schoenberg reversed Levetzow's original ordering of the poems, perhaps as a nod of "thanks" and then "farewell" to Levetzow or Zemlinsky:

1. "Dank"
2. "Abschied"

He wrote both songs in a ponderous Wagnerian declamatory idiom, (Note: In setting a Hugo von Hofmannsthal text in 1899, Schoenberg actually asked that it be "less sung than declaimed, ... performed in a descriptive manner like reading about an old picture". Harvey Sachs considered the singer's line "forceful" or "strained".) with leaps down by fifth or octave at phrase or verse endings. Harvey Sachs noted the texts' emotion, with expressions like "beautiful sorrow" and "all-embracing limitless grief".

Both songs modulate to the parallel major key from minor keys B and D respectively. There are constant tempo changes. Dennis Gerlach noted "striking motifs" as opening and closing devices. "Dank" ends somewhat expansively and very resoundingly with a third, emphatic thanks in the text. In "Abschied", Gerlach observed the "metaphorical transformation of the lyric self" in the expressive tremolo passage.

In the music's "rich chords, parallel thirds and sixths, and heavy bass octaves", Hans Heinz Stuckenschmidt heard Brahms. But in its chromaticism and orchestral approach to the piano (including tremolos), he identified Wagner. Sachs considered that the music lacked Brahms's decorum and Wagner's melodic eloquence, concurring with Mark Berry in noting dense textures and ample (even "hyper-Romantic") expressive markings.

=== Influences ===
Though Schoenberg was mostly self-taught, Zemlinsky had given him counterpoint lessons. Schoenberg played a flea-market cello in Zemlinsky's amateur string orchestra Polyhymnia. Zemlinsky successfully suggested Schoenberg's String Quartet in D major (1897) to the Wiener Tonkünstlerverein, for which Johannes Brahms was the honorary chair.

Schoenberg cited Zemlinsky's embrace of both Brahms and Richard Wagner, who had been somewhat dichotomized in the War of the Romantics, as influential. Among lesser influences, he cited composers Franz Liszt, Anton Bruckner, Antonín Dvořák, and "perhaps" Hugo Wolf. He later reflected on his early Lieder as derivative.

Theodor W. Adorno noted Schoenberg's synthesis of Brahms's "seamless ... thematic work" and Wagner's "chromatic, expressive ... harmon[y]". He compared certain passages of "Abschied" to the first of Brahms's 1896 Vier ernste Gesänge and to some passages from Wagner's Der Ring des Nibelungen (1869–1876). (Note: At the Kranichstein hunting lodge used for the Darmstädter Ferienkurse in the 1950s and 60s, Adorno talked (from the piano) to then young composers about "The Young Schoenberg" (31 May 1955). Touching on the "little known" Op. 1, he had sheet music only for "Abschied", not "Dank".)

Michael Musgrave emphasized the "central importance" of Brahms to Schoenberg, "predictabl[y]" as Schoenberg began by writing chamber music in 1890s Vienna, which Musgrave noted was "dominated" by Brahms's influence (notwithstanding Bruckner's and Wagner's successes there). Schoenberg himself later emphasized his debt to Brahms in particular, contrasting himself with most modernists. But unlike most Brahmsians, he did not identify as a musical conservative. (Note: Sachs and Schoenberg himself cited Max Reger as a similar example (of a forward-looking Brahmsian), but Sachs disagreed with Schoenberg that Gustav Mahler or Richard Strauss were much influenced by Brahms.) Schoenberg's horizons widened after Brahms died (1897); after writing only absolute music, he wrote a tone poem fragment Frühlingstod for large orchestra (1898) after Nikolaus Lenau.

=== Genre ===
Adorno compared Schoenberg's Zwei Gesänge to Claude Debussy's Proses lyriques (1892–1893). In these works, he argued, both composers wrote songs resembling longer oratorio or opera fragments more than short Lieder or mélodies respectively. Their piano writing was transcription-like (in the sense of Liszt's transcriptions, which included operas). Their music was of a more prosodic, less lyrical character. Notably, Wagner influenced both Debussy and Schoenberg.

Sachs noted that Schoenberg then earned a living by making reductions of more successful composers' music, including opera and operetta, as well as by conducting workers' choirs. For Stuckenschmidt, the Zwei Gesänge, in their scale, dynamic range, and many detailed expressive markings, anticipated his 1911 extended orchestral song cycle Gurre-Lieder.
