= Ute Vinzing =

German opera singer, soprano

- Born: 9 September 1936 (age 88); Wuppertal, Germany
- Occupation: Operatic soprano
- Organizations: Theater Lübeck; Opernhaus Wuppertal
- Website: Kammersängerin

Ute Vinzing (born 9 September, 1936) is a German dramatic soprano who received the title Kammersängerin. She is known for roles such as Wagner's Brünnhilde, Isolde, Ortrud and Kundry, and for Elektra and the Dyer's Wife by Richard Strauss, which she performed at international stages.

== Career ==
=== Training and artistic beginnings ===
Born in Wuppertal, Vinzing first learned the profession of seamstress. She then took private singing lessons, first with Elisabeth Boeker in Lüdenscheid. Without the knowledge of her family she continued her studies with Francesco Carrino in Düsseldorf. In December 1966, she won first prize at the first Bundeswettbewerb Gesang., with Josef Greindl and Elisabeth Grümmer as jury members. She then received an audition from Wieland Wagner, who recommended her to Bernhard Klee, then Generalmusikdirektor at the Theater Lübeck, who made her a member of the ensemble.

In 1967, she made her debut at the Theater Lübeck in the role of Marie in Smetana's Die verkaufte Braut. During the following three years in Lübeck she worked on 14 leading roles. At first she was mainly used in the Italian repertoire, but sang these roles in German, as was customary at the time. Her Lübeck roles included among others Mimì in Puccini's La bohème, the title role in his Madama Butterfly, Desdemona in Verdi's Otello, Leonora in his Die Macht des Schicksals, as well as roles in contemporary repertoire, such as in Aufführung by Ján Cikker and the Bride in Fortner's Bluthochzeit. In the latter production, she got to know Martha Mödl, from whom she subsequently received instruction in voice training and language instructions. In Lübeck she also performed her first Wagner roles: Elisabeth in Tannhäuser and Senta in Der fliegende Holländer.

From 1971 to 1976, Vinzing joined the ensemble of the Opernhaus Wuppertal directed by Kurt Horres, where she expanded her dramatic roles. In Italian, she added Abigaille in Verdi's Nabucco, Élisabetta in his Don Carlos, and the title role in Puccini's Tosca to her repertoire. In Wuppertal, she also performed Brünnhilde in Wagner's The Ring of the Nibelungen for the first time in 1974. Her last role in Wuppertal in 1976, was Kundry in Parsifal after which, she worked as a freelance singer.

=== Guest performances in Germany and Austria ===
From 1972, Vinzing performed extensively on German stages. During her engagement in Lübeck she appeared several times at the Deutsche Oper am Rhein. There she was especially successful as Senta, which she performed more than 100 times during her career. In 1972, she first appeared as Isolde in Wagner's Tristan und Isolde at the Theater Hagen. In 1973, she took over the Empress in Die Frau ohne Schatten by Richard Strauss at the Staatstheater Nürnberg, staged by Hans-Peter Lehmann and conducted by Hans Gierster, with Karl-Heinz Thiemann as the Emperor and Astrid Varnay as the Nurse. In 1976 she first appeared in the title role of Elektra by Strauss, with Anny Schlemm as Klytämnestra, at the Staatstheater Hannover, where she appeared regularly. She made her role debut as Kundry in Wagner's Parsifal there in the 1981/82 season in a new production with Siegfried Jerusalem in the title role and Bent Norup as Klingsor. A reviewer noted that she "impressed the audience with her intense performance and confident mastery of her powerful soprano, full of timbre in all registers, with profound depth and clear high notes". In March/April 1981, in April 1982 and again in March 1983 she appeared in Hanover at gala performances and in repertoire performances as Elektra (conductors Heinz Fricke, George Alexander Albrecht, Ralf Weikert and Ferdinand Leitner). Her Elektra in April 1981 "radiated intensity even in the last moments" and was praised as a "really great achievement" by the critics. In April 1981, she stepped in as the Dyer's Wife in Die Frau ohne Schatten, reviewed as "outstanding in every respect" and "inspired audience and critics both in her performance and through the perfect leadership of her powerful voice". In June 1981 Vinzing sang Siegfried-Brünnhilde at the Staatstheater Hannover "with a luminous voice"; "she unfolded a tremendous power and also got a lot out of the part in acting".

From the end of the 1970s, she appeared regularly at the Deutsche Oper Berlin, several times as the Dyer's Wife. A review noted: "Vinzing fully met the high expectations placed in her both vocally and representatively; she revealed with convincing intensity the change of the dyer's wife from an unfulfilled quarrelsome woman to a loving wife". In February 1981 she also sang Elektra in Berlin. Her interpretation of the text was "both understandable and thoughtful", the presentation "gripping", without the "least vocal fatigue". Vinzing was compared in vocal and playing intensity to the soprano Ursula Schröder-Feinen, who was considered in Berlin as the unsurpassed soprano in this role. In June 1988 she was the "sovereign" Brünnhilde in the Götterdämmerung gala performance for the 75th birthday of the conductor Heinrich Hollreiser. In September 1988, Vinzing was Elektra when Ruth Hesse made her role debut as Klytämnestra. In February 1990 Vinzing again sang the title role. In September 1990 Vinzing performed again as Elektra at the DOB during a guest performance of the Semperoper at the Berliner Festspiele in Dresden. In the 1982/83 season at the Theater Augsburg she took over Brünnhilde in the Götterdämmerung in the revival of the last part of Wagner's Ring cycle. Vinzing sang with "sufficient volume and perseverance to endure the whole opera without signs of fatigue".

Vinzing appeared at the Hamburg State Opera as Leonore in Beethoven's Fidelio, as Kundry and the Dyer's Wife. At the Bavarian State Opera in Munich, she appeared as Isolde, Brünnhilde and Kundry at the Badisches Staatstheater Karlsruhe (season 1984/85); in November 1984 as Isolde in Tristan und Isolde, in April 1985 as Brünnhilde in the Ring cycle, in June 1985 as Ortrud, at short notice as a substitute, in July 1985 then as the Dyer's Wife, in May 1987 as Fidelio, at the Staatstheater Stuttgart (season 1984/85; as Isolde), at the Cologne Opera (1986 as Isolde). She appeared at the Semperoper in Dresden as Elektra, at the Oper Bonn also as Elektra and as the Dyer's Wife. In June 1988 she sang Brünnhilde in Die Walküre in a concert performance at the Kölner Philharmonie with the Gürzenich Orchestra Cologne (Marek Janowski conducting); she won praise for "the size and volume of her apparently effortlessly used splendid soprano".

Between 1976 and 1991, Vinzing made guest appearances in over 30 performances at the Vienna State Opera, including Senta, Leonore in Fidelio, Elektra, Dyer's Wife, Kundry, Brünnhilde and Isolde. In February 1981 she sang Isolde in Vienna conducted by Heinrich Hollreiser; In May 1985, she sang in a Wagner concert in Vienna conducted by Leonard Bernstein, which included the third act of Siegfried alongside James King, and the final scene of Die Walküre, alongside Thomas Stewart.

=== International guest performances ===
In 1977, Vinzing performed at the Paris Opera as Brünnhilde in Die Walküre. In February 1985 she appeared there as Isolde with René Kollo as Tristan, conducted by Marek Janowski.

In June 1983, she was one of the three soprano soloists in Mahler's Eight Symphony ("Symphony of a Thousand") at the Basilica dei Santi Giovanni e Paolo in Venice, conducted by Eliahu Inbal. In the 1983/84 season she appeared as Isolde at the Teatro Comunale di Bologna in a new production directed by Yuri Lyubimov. In the summer of 1984 she sang Brünnhilde in the production by George London in the Ring cycle of the Seattle Opera, U.S.. In April 1984 she appeared as Brünnhilde in Die Walküre with the ensemble of the Metropolitan Opera in two guest performances at the Kennedy Center for the Performing Arts in Washington, D.C.. She made her debut at the Met as Elektra.

She also performed internationally at the Grand Théâtre de Genève (as Brünnhilde), at the Copenhagen Opera House (as Isolde), several times at the Teatro Colón (1977 as Isolde with Jess Thomas as partner; 1980 as Ortrud in Lohengrin with Jess Thomas in the title role; 1987 as Elektra with "vocal strength and unconditional commitment, especially in the orgiastic conclusion" also there as Brünnhilde), at the Teatro Comunale di Firenze (October 1988, as Isolde) and at the Marseille Opera House (1989; as Elektra). In Marseille she sang in October 1992, "vocally fully satisfying the demands of her part", also for the last time the Dyer's Wife, whom she portrayed as an "energetic, strong-willed woman without hysteria".

=== Honour and stage farewell ===
Vinzing was awarded the title of Kammersängerin. In October 1993 she retired from the stage with a gala concert in the Lübecker Holstentorhalle. She sang excerpts from Die Walküre and Götterdämmerung, in which her long-time stage colleagues Donald McIntyre (Wotan) and Spas Wenkoff (Siegfried) were her partners.

=== Private life ===
Vinzing was married to the musician and music professor Claus Rößner (1936-2016), whom she had met during her engagement in Lübeck. From 1961 to 1971 Rößner was musical assistant to Karl Böhm in Bayreuth, later first Kapellmeister in Lübeck and professor in Lübeck for choral singing at the Universität der Künste Berlin.

== Repertoire ==
Vinzing was esteemed as a dramatic soprano, and as a Wagner singer. She was one of the few "real highly dramatic singers" in the German-speaking world. In the course of her career she sang about 50 different roles. Later in her career she reduced her repertoire to about ten to twelve core roles, mainly in Wagner and Strauss (among others Brünnhilde, Isolde, Ortrud, Kundry, Elektra, and the Dyer's Wife). Due to the difficulty of her roles, Vinzing limited her performances to about 35-40 evenings per year.

Between 1974 and 1987, Vinzing sang the role of Brünnhilde in more than ten different complete Ring cycles, among others in Wuppertal (1974), Hanover (February 1983; in Die Walküre and Siegfried), Karlsruhe (April 1985, June/July 1988 in Götterdämmerung), Düsseldorf, Hamburg, Berlin (March 1986 in the complete ring cycle, in Die Walküre with "great musical certainty and acting maturity" in November 1986 again in Götterdämmerung; also in March 1989 and May 1990), Cologne (June/November 1988 and June 1989; in concert performances of the Ring under Marek Janowski), Vienna, Geneva, Seattle (June and August 1984), Barcelona (March 1985; as Siegfried-Brünnhilde), Buenos Aires, Paris (1977, February 1986), Munich (May/June 1987, January 1988 with "victorious top notes") and Orange (July 1988).

In July 1981, she was "very engaged", as the partner of Hans Beirer at the Deutsche Oper Berlin (DOB) in the Götterdämmerung performance, in which Beirer performed once again as Siegfried in the Ring cycle on the occasion of his 70th birthday.

== Recordings ==
Vinzing's operatic work is inadequately documented on records, as Vinzing was not tied to any record company in the course of her career. There exist only two official audio documents: in 1984, a live recording of a concert performance of Elektra was released, first on LP and later also on CD. It was made in Paris with the Orchestre National de France, conducted by Christof Prick; her partners were Leonie Rysanek as Chrysothemis, Maureen Forrester as Klytämnestra and Bent Norup as Orest. In 1987, EMI released an unabridged studio recording of Die Frau ohne Schatten, with Wolfgang Sawallisch conducting.

A studio recording of Elektra, to be conducted by Klaus Tennstedt, already planned by EMI, did not come about. However, there are some radio recordings of Vinzing. The label Gala also released a CD box with live recordings from 1972 to 1985 in 2006.
