= Radikal jung =

Annual weeklong German theatre festival

Radikal jung – Das Festival junger Regisseure (Radical Young, the Festival for Young Directors) is an annual weeklong German theatre festival at the Münchner Volkstheater, Munich. It began in 2005, as a forum and stage for the next generation of directors.

A jury will select productions by young directors of German theater to stage. At the end of the festival week an audience prize of €2,500 is awarded. Parallel to the performances is a supporting program and public discussions with the directors and a member of the jury abouts the future of theater and new ways of funding.

== Participants ==
=== 2005 ===
Thalia Theater Hamburg: Port, dir. David Bösch
Deutsches Schauspielhaus Hamburg: Don Karlos, dir. Laurent Chétouane
Burgtheater Wien: Untertagblues, dir. Friederike Heller
Schauspiel Frankfurt: Jack und Jill, dir. Christiane Schneider
Schauspiel Frankfurt: Dantons Tod, dir. Philipp Preuss
Münchner Volkstheater: Was ihr wollt, dir. Jorinde Dröse
Münchner Volkstheater: Fegefeuer in Ingolstadt, dir. Jorinde Dröse
Münchner Volkstheater: Nieder Bayern, dir. Florian Fiedler

=== 2006 ===
Schauspiel Frankfurt: Die Leiden des jungen Werther, dir. Florian Fiedler (winner of the public prize)
Staatstheater Stuttgart: Früchte des Nichts, dir. Roger Vontobel
Schauspielhaus Bochum: Phaidras Liebe, dir. Lisa Nielebock
Deutsches Schauspielhaus Hamburg: Lila/Purple, dir. Jens Zimmermann
Münchner Volkstheater: Viel Lärm um nichts, dir. Jorinde Dröse
Mädchenchor Giessen: Dreckig tanzen, dir. Susanne Zaun
Schauspiel Essen: Ein Sommernachtstraum, dir. David Bösch (winner of the public prize)
Thalia Theater Hamburg: Antigone, dir. Christine Eder

=== 2007 ===
Deutsches Nationaltheater Weimar: Othello, der Mohr von Venedig, dir. Tilmann Köhler
Deutsches Theater Berlin: Waldstein oder der Tod des Walter Gieseking am 6. Juni 2005, dir. Hanna Rudolph (winner of the public prize)
Schaubühne am Lehniner Platz: Augenlicht, dir. Ingo Berk
Thalia Theater Hamburg: Viel Lärm um nichts, dir. David Bösch
Münchner Volkstheater: Frühlings Erwachen, dir. Christine Eder
Thalia Theater Hamburg: Finkenwerder Herbstprinzen oder wie die Äpfel fliegen lernten, dir. Frank Abt
Deutsches Schauspielhaus Hamburg: Spieltrieb, dir. Roger Vontobel
Schauspiel Essen: Bluthochzeit, dir. Rafael Sanchez
Münchner Kammerspiele: Engel, dir. Felicitas Brucker

=== 2008 ===
Thalia Theater Hamburg: Gerettet, dir. Jette Steckel
Theaterhaus Jena: Second life - "So real, wie Du dich fühlst", dir. Tomas Schweigen
Münchner Volkstheater: Schilf, dir. Bettina Bruinier (winner of the public prize)
Staatstheater Stuttgart: the kids are alright, dir. Seraina Maria Sievi
Staatsschauspiel Dresden: Antigone, dir. Yael Ronen
schauspielfrankfurt: Robinson Crusoe oder Friday, I´m in Love, dir. Robert Lehniger
schauspielfrankfurt: Don Quijote, dir. Simon Solberg
Deutsches Theater Berlin: Roberto Zucco, dir. Jakob Fedler
Schauspielhaus Graz: Alice, dir. Viktor Bodó

=== 2009 ===
Schauspiel Leipzig: Juli, dir. Mareike Mikat
Deutsches Theater Berlin: Caligula, dir. Jette Steckel (winner of the public prize)
Schaubühne Berlin: Die Räuber, dir. Lars Eidinger
Thalia Theater Hamburg: Letztes Territorium, dir. Corinna Sommerhäuser
Theaterakademie Hamburg: Ödipus, dir. Felix Rothenhäusler
Maxim-Gorki-Theater Berlin: Glaube Liebe Hoffnung, dir. Ronny Jakubaschk
Theater Erlangen: Die Reise, dir. Eike Hannemann
Münchner Volkstheater: Faust, dir. Simon Solberg

=== 2010 ===
schauspielfrankfurt: Hedda Gabler, dir. Alice Buddeberg
Münchner Volkstheater: Romeo und Julia, dir. Simon Solberg
Münchner Volkstheater: Eros, dir. Christine Eder
Thalia Theater Hamburg: Amerika, dir. Bastian Kraft (winner of the public prize)
Thalia Theater Hamburg: Ernst ist das Leben (Bunbury) dir. Anna Bergmann
Maxim-Gorki-Theater Berlin: Der Geisterseher, dir. Antú Romero Nunes
Schauspiel Leipzig: Im Pelz, dir. Johannes Schmit
Schauspielhaus Bochum: Himmelangst, dir. Lilli-Hannah Hoepner

=== 2011 ===
Heimathafen Neukölln (Berlin): ArabQueen, dir. Nicole Oder (winner of the public prize)
schauspielfrankfurt: Peer Gynt, dir. Antú Romero Nunes
Kleines Theater "Duško Radovic" Belgrad: Gott ist ein DJ - Bog je di džej, dir. Miloš Lolić
Schauspielhaus Zürich: Stiller, dir. Heike M. Goetz
Burgtheater Wien: Dorian Gray, dir. Bastian Kraft
Ballhaus Naunynstraße Berlin: Verrücktes Blut, dir. Nurkan Erpulat
Münchner Volkstheater: Das fünfte Imperium, dir. Mareike Mikat
Gate Theatre London/ATC: Fatherland, dir. Caroline Steinbeis
Théâtre national de Belgique Brussels: Life: Reset, dir. Fabrice Murgia
Centraltheater Leipzig: Vatermord, dir. Robert Borgmann

=== 2012 ===
Maxim-Gorki-Theater Berlin: Rocco und seine Brüder, dir. Antú Romero Nunes
HOPPart Company Budapest: Korijolánusz, dir. Csaba Polgár
International Institute of Political Murder: Hate Radio (UA), dir. Milo Rau
Theaterhaus Jena: Faust, dir. Moritz Schönecker
Staatsschauspiel Dresden: Tschick (UA), dir. Jan Gehler
Het Huis van Bourgondië Maastricht: This is my dad (UA), dir. Ilay den Boer
Münchner Volkstheater: Felix Krull, dir. Bastian Kraft
schauspielfrankfurt: Der große Gatsby, dir. Christopher Rüping

=== 2013 ===
Schauspielhaus Zürich: Kinder der Sonne, dir. Daniela Löffner
Theater Bielefeld: Demut vor deinen Taten Baby (UA), dir. Babett Grube
Thalia Theater (Hamburg): Die Protokolle von Toulouse (UA), dir. Malte C. Lachmann
Stadttheater Klagenfurt: Winterreise, dir. Marco Štorman
International Institute of Political Murder: Breiviks Erklärung, dir. Milo Rau
O-Team mit dem Theaterhaus Jena: Ich bedanke mich für alles (UA), dir. Samuel Hof
Home Made Ensemble Tel Aviv: Shall we dance (UA), dir. Abigail Rubin and Yoav Bartel
Münchner Volkstheater: Arabboy, dir. Abdullah Kenan Karaca
Schauspiel Köln: Die Glasmenagerie, dir. Sebastian Kreyer
Tmuna Theater Tel Aviv: Mein Jerusalem - a performance by Sabine Sauber (UA), dir. Eyal Weiser

=== 2014 ===
Free production: This is the land - the zionist creation rejects' salon (UA), dir. Eyal Weiser
all exclusive productions/in-house festival: Life & Strive (UA), dir. and concept Anat Eisenberg and Mirko Winkel
Free production: The Lottery (UA), dir. und Konzept Saar Székely and Keren Sheffi
Maxim-Gorki-Theater: Schwimmen lernen, dir. Hakan Savaş Mican
Schauspielhaus Zürich: Die Radiofamilie, dir. Mélanie Huber
Teatru Spălătorie Chișinău: Dear Moldova, can we kiss just a little bit? (UA), dir. Jessica Glause
Ballhaus Naunynstraße, Landestheater Niederösterreich and Maxim gorki Theater: Ich rufe meine Brüder, dir. Michael Ronen
Unkoordinierte Bewegung: Austrian Psycho (UA)
Münchner Volkstheater: Der große Gatsby, dir. Abdullah Kenan Karaca
si vous pouviez lécher mon coeur with Festival d'Avignon et al.: Les Particules élémentaires, dir. Julien Gosselin
Nationaltheater Mannheim and Hessische Theaterakademie: Hurenkinder Schusterjungen (UA), dir. Tarik Goetzke
Schauspiel Frankfurt: 2. Sinfonie-Rausch (UA), dir. Ersan Mondtag
