= Vienna Radio Symphony Orchestra =

Austrian orchestra

- Radio orchestra
- Official logo (2021)
- Native name: ORF Radio-Symphonieorchester Wien
- Short name: RSO Wien
- Former name: ORF-Symphonieorchester (1969–2009)
- Founded: 1969; 57 years ago
- Location: Vienna, Austria
- Concert hall: Various (see below)
- Principal conductor: Markus Poschner
- Website: rso.orf.at

The Vienna Radio Symphony Orchestra (German: ORF Radio-Symphonieorchester Wien, or RSO Wien) is the orchestra of the Austrian national broadcaster Österreichischer Rundfunk (ORF). Unlike most other Austrian orchestras, the RSO Wien has a substantial focus on contemporary classical music. The current Intendant of the orchestra is Christoph Becher.

== History ==
Founded in 1969 with the name of the ORF-Symphonieorchester (ORF Symphony Orchestra), it is the only radio orchestra in the country. It acquired its current name in 2009.

The orchestra performs in a number of venues, including Radiokulturhaus (in Vienna), Konzerthaus, Vienna, Theater an der Wien and Musikverein.

Milan Horvat was the orchestra's first chief conductor, from 1969 to 1975. During the tenure of Bertrand de Billy as chief conductor, from 2002 to 2010, he had disputes with management over funding and the continuing status of the orchestra. In January 2009, the RSO Wien announced the appointment of Cornelius Meister as its seventh chief conductor, effective with the 2010–2011 season and with an initial contract through August 2014. Meister has conducted the RSO Wien in a commercial recording of the music of Gottfried von Einem. Meister concluded his RSO Wien tenure in 2018.

In 2014, Marin Alsop first guest-conducted the RSO Wien. In January 2018, the RSO Wien announced the appointment of Alsop as its next chief conductor, effective 1 September 2019, with an initial contract of 3 years, later extended until 2025. She is the first female conductor to be named chief conductor of the RSO Wien. Alsop took the title of chief conductor designate with immediate effect, through the 2018–2019 season. Alsop concluded her RSO Wien tenure at the close of the 2024–2025 season and now has the title of Ehrendirigentin (honorary conductor) of the orchestra.

In February 2023, the RSO Wien faced proposed budgetary reductions and austerity measures which placed the existence of the orchestra in jeopardy. However, in March 2023, the Austrian federal government stated assurance that the existence of the RSO Wien was not to be in jeopardy, and that subsidy funding was secured for the RSO Wien through 2026, with future financial plans to be decided in due course.

In 2018, Markus Poschner first guest-conducted the RSO Wien. In February 2025, the RSO Wien announced the appointment of Poschner as its next chief conductor, subject to the settlement of secure funding for the orchestra.

== Chief conductors ==
- Milan Horvat (1969–1975)
- Leif Segerstam (1975–1982)
- Lothar Zagrosek (1982–1986)
- Pinchas Steinberg (1989–1996)
- Dennis Russell Davies (1996–2002)
- Bertrand de Billy (2002–2010)
- Cornelius Meister (2010–2018)
- Marin Alsop (2019–2025)
- Markus Poschner (2026–present)

== See also ==
- Radio orchestra
