= Tilmann Köhler =

German theatre director (born 1979)

- Born: 1979 (age 45–46); Weimar, Saxony, West Germany
- Education: Ernst Busch Academy of Dramatic Arts
- Occupation: Stage director
- Organizations: Deutsches Nationaltheater Weimar; Staatsschauspiel Dresden

Tilmann Köhler (born 1979) is a German theatre stage director who has worked with the ensembles of the Deutsches Nationaltheater Weimar and the Staatsschauspiel Dresden. His broad repertoire includes classical plays and world premiered. Several of his productions have been invited to international festivals. Köhler turned to also staging operas in 2013, beginning with Handel's Teseo at the Oper Frankfurt, where he returned to direct Martin's Le Vin herbé, Mozart's Le nozze di Figaro and Zemlinsky's Der Traumgörge.

== Life and career ==
Köhler was born in Weimar. He was a theatre actor and director at the Theaterfabrik of the Theater Altenburg-Gera. He then studied theatre directing from 2001 to 2005 at the Ernst Busch Academy of Dramatic Arts.

=== Drama ===
Köhler worked from 2005 as stage director for the Deutsches Nationaltheater Weimar. He then moved to the Staatsschauspiel Dresden, where he also led the studio. His production of Ferdinand Bruckner's Krankheit der Jugend was invited to the 2007 Berliner Theatertreffen. He staged Goethe's Faust I in Weimar in 2008, 200 years after the first performance. His staging of Brecht's Die heilige Johanna der Schlachthöfe was awarded the Kurt-Hübner-Regiepreis in 2009. He also worked for the Maxim Gorki Theater in Berlin, Schauspiel Stuttgart, Deutsches Theater Berlin, Deutsches Schauspielhaus in Hamburg, Theater Basel and the Oper Frankfurt. Internationally, he directed in São Paulo, Taipeh, at the Moskauer Künstlertheater, in Gwangju in Korea and at the National Theatre Bratislava.

=== Opera ===
In 2013 Köhler directed opera for the first time, Handel's Teseo at the Oper Frankfurt, invited by Bernd Loebe who had seen his work. Teseo was played at the Bockenheimer Depot, the company's smaller venue. He returned to direct two more Handel operas at the same place, Radamisto in 2016 and Xerxes in 2017. He was invited to direct Zemlinsky's Der Traumgörge in 2020 but it had to be postponed due to the COVID-19 pandemic. His next project there was Martin's Le Vin herbé, now for the opera house and adjusting to social distancing. It was prepared including the dress rehearsal but the performances were cancelled due to another lockdown. It was finally played in 2022.

Köhler was invited to direct the opening of the 2023/24 season, Mozart's Le nozze di Figaro in the first performance with the new music director Thomas Guggeis. A reviewer from the FAZ noted that Köhler staged playful "serious games" ("ernste Spiele"), in which the women win by "wit, cleverness and presence of mind". Der Traumgörge was finally presented in 2024, conducted by Markus Poschner, with AJ Glueckert in the title role, Zuzana Marková as Gertraud, Magdalena Hinterdobler as Grete and Liviu Holender as Hans. He staged Görge as an outsider in a village, as a bookworm, dreamer and intellectual, and identified the princess of his dreams with the outcast Gertraud.

== Works ==
Productions directed by Köhler include:

- Der Drache by Evgeny Schwartz, Deutsches Nationaltheater Weimar 2006
- Krankheit der Jugend by Ferdinand Bruckner, Deutsches Nationaltheater Weimar 2006. Invitation to the 2007 Berliner Theatertreffen
- Amoklauf mein Kinderspiel by Thomas Freyer, world premiere, Deutsches Nationaltheater Weimar 2006. Invitation to Festival Premières Strasbourg and to Deutsches Kinder- und Jugendtheatertreffen "Augenblick Mal! 2007"
- Othello by William Shakespeare, Deutsches Nationaltheater Weimar 2006. Invitation to Radikal jung 2007
- Separatisten by Thomas Freyer, world premiere, Maxim Gorki Theater Berlin 2007
- Faust I by Goethe, Deutsches Nationaltheater Weimar 2008
- Hamlet by Shakespeare, Maxim Gorki Theater 2008
- Die heilige Johanna der Schlachthöfe by Bertolt Brecht, Staatsschauspiel Dresden 2009.
- Der geteilte Himmel after the novel by Christa Wolf, Staatsschauspiel Dresden 2013
- Teseo by Handel, Oper Frankfurt 2013
- King Arthur by Purcell and John Dryden, Staatsschauspiel Dresden / Semperoper Dresden 2013
- Jugend ohne Gott after the novel by Ödön von Horvath, Deutsches Theater Berlin 2013
- Der aufhaltsame Aufstieg des Arturo Ui by Brecht, Staatsschauspiel Dresden 2014
- Mario und der Zauberer by Mann, Schauspiel Stuttgart 2014
- Drei Schwestern by Anton Chekhov, Staatsschauspiel Dresden 2014
- Mein deutsches deutsches Land by Thomas Freyer, world premiere, Staatsschauspiel Dresden 2014. Invitation to the Autorentheatertage Berlin 2015
- Macbeth by Shakespeare, Deutsches Theater 2015
- Maß für Maß by Shakespeare, Staatsschauspiel Dresden 2015
- Die Jungfrau von Orleans by Schiller, Schauspielhaus Hamburg 2015
- Radamisto by Handel, Oper Frankfurt 2016
- Xerxes by Handel, Oper Frankfurt 2017
- Bianca e Falliero by Rossini, Oper Frankfurt / Tiroler Festspiele Erl 2022
- Undine by Albert Lortzing, Oper Leipzig 2022
- Das Leben ist Traum by Calderón de la Barca, Staatsschauspiel Dresden 2023
- Le Vin herbé by Frank Martin, Oper Frankfurt, 2023
- Le nozze di Figaro by Mozart, Oper Frankfurt 2023
- Der Traumgörge by Zemlinsky, Oper Frankfurt 2024
