= Der Traumgörge =

Opera by Alexander Zemlinsky

- Opera by Alexander von Zemlinsky
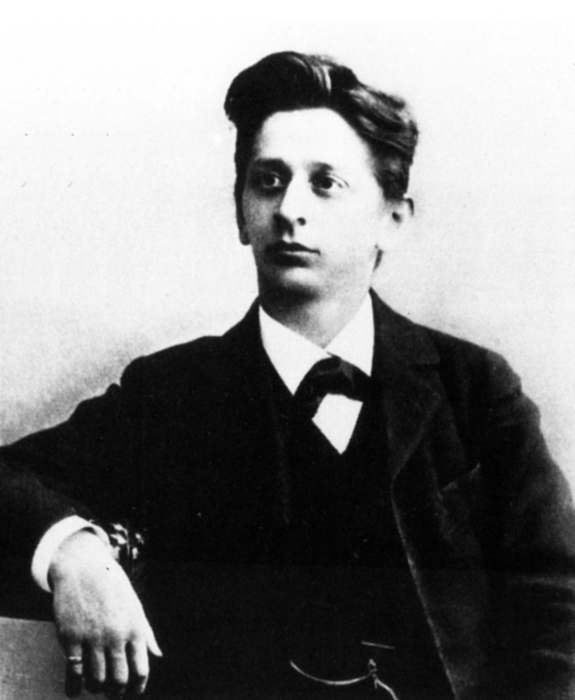
- The composer in 1908
- Translation: Görge the Dreamer
- Librettist: Leo Feld
- Language: German
- Premiere: April 1980; Staatstheater Nürnberg

Der Traumgörge (Görge the Dreamer), Op. 11, is an opera in two acts and an epilogue by Austrian composer Alexander Zemlinsky. The libretto was written by Leo Feld based on the fairy tale "Vom unsichtbaren Königreiche" by Richard von Volkmann and the poem "Der arme Peter" by Heinrich Heine. After the prepared premiere at the Vienna State Opera in 1907 did not happen, the work was finally first performed by the Staatstheater Nürnberg in 1980.

== Composition history ==
Zemlinsky began composition of the Märchenoper (fairy-tale opera) in 1904 and completed it in 1906.

== Performance history ==
Der Traumgörge was intended for performance at the Vienna State Opera (then known as the Vienna Court Opera), where Gustav Mahler, a mentor of Zemlinsky's, was musical director. Mahler had encouraged his younger colleague to compose the opera following the success of Es war einmal which Mahler had premiered in 1900. In 1907, the same year Der Traumgörge was scheduled for performance, Mahler hired Zemlinsky to be an assistant conductor. Shortly thereafter, however, Mahler abruptly resigned and his successor, Felix Weingartner, dropped Der Traumgörge from the schedule, even though the work had already gone into rehearsal. Zemlinsky himself then resigned in protest.

Zemlinsky moved on to other compositional projects and, deciding that Der Traumgörge needed revision, made little effort to further promote it. The original performance materials were discovered in the archives of the Vienna State Opera in the 1970s, a period of renewed interest in Zemlinsky's music. This led to the opera's belated premiere at the Staatstheater Nürnberg, Germany, on 11 October 1980.

The work was staged at the Deutsche Oper Berlin (2007), the Staatsoper Hannover (2016), Opéra national de Lorraine (2020), Opéra de Dijon (2020), and Oper Frankfurt (2024). The Frankfurt production was conducted by Markus Poschner and directed by Tilmann Köhler with AJ Glueckert as Görge, Zuzana Marková as the Princess/Gertraud, Magdalena Hinterdobler as Grete and Liviu Holender as Hans. Köhler equated Gertraud with the Princess. Poschner claimed that it was the first staging of the work to present the music complete and unabridged.

== Roles ==
Roles, voice types, premier cast
| Role | Voice type | Premiere cast, 11 October 1980 Conductor: Hans Gierster |
|---|---|---|
| Gertraud | soprano | Johanna-Lotte Fecht |
| Grete | soprano | Sharon Markovich |
| Görge | tenor | Karl-Heinz Thiemann |
| Hans | baritone | Peter Weber |
| Kaspar | baritone | Andreas Förster |
| Marei | soprano | Ursula Wendt-Walther |
| Matthes | bass | |
| Züngl | tenor | Wilhelm Teepe |
| Princess | soprano | Johanna-Lotte Fecht |
| The miller | bass | |
| The pastor | bass | |
| A voice | mezzo-soprano | |
| Innkeeper | tenor | |
| Innkeeper's wife | soprano | Elizabeth Kingdon |

== Synopsis ==
Act 1

Görge, a village youth, is engaged to Grete, a marriage arranged by Grete's father, the Miller, in order to maintain ownership of the mill, which is Görge's inheritance. Grete is disconcerted by Görge's obsession with books and fairy-tales and when her former sweetheart, Hans, returns from military service, she is overjoyed. Hans is dismissive of Grete's engagement to Görge. Görge recounts the vision he had of a beautiful princess come to him in a dream, much to Grete's and Hans's bemusement. Hans leaves disdainfully.

Sitting on the bank of a stream, Görge again falls into reverie and the Dream-Princess appears once more, inviting him to join her in a magical world of beauty and make-believe. Waking from the dream, Görge remembers he is to be married that afternoon but, as the wedding guests begin to arrive, decides he must pursue his dream and flees the village.

Act 2

It is three years later and Görge now lives in a different village with another woman, Gertraud. Gertraud is treated as an outcast by the villagers, some of whom suspect she is a witch or in league with the devil. Görge himself is destitute and in a wretched state. However, when the villagers, led by Kaspar, decide to organise a peasants' revolt against the landowners, they approach Görge, as the most articulate member of their community, to be their leader. At first, Görge is enthusiastic, but, when told he must first forsake Gertraud, he refuses to leave her side. Marei, who is attracted to Görge, swears revenge.

Gertraud, deciding she is a burden to Görge, prepares to leave. Görge finally realises that he loves her and asks her to be his wife. Marei, discovering them together, leads the villagers in a frenzied charge on the house, setting it ablaze. Görge emerges with Gertraud and, berating the mob, leads her to safety.

Epilogue

It is a year later: Görge has returned with Gertraud to the village of his youth, inherited the mill and established a school, while Gertraud has cared for the poor and needy. The thankful villagers, led by the now-married Hans and Grete, express their gratitude. Görge realises that his dream has been fulfilled in the idyllic life he now shares with Gertraud and the two declare their love in the dusk of early evening.

== Instrumentation ==
- 4 flutes (3rd and 4th doubling piccolo), 3 oboes (3rd doubling cor anglais), 3 clarinets in B-flat/A (2nd doubling E-flat clarinet, 3rd doubling bass clarinet), 3 bassoons (3rd doubling contrabassoon);
- 4 horns, 3 trumpets, 4 trombones, bass tuba;
- timpani, percussion (cymbals, bass drum, side drum, triangle, tam-tam, whip, rattle, xylophone, glockenspiel), 2 harps, celesta, guitar;
- strings

offstage: 4 violins, 4 horns, harp, glockenspiel

== Recordings ==
- Capriccio 10241/42: Janis Martin, Josef Protschka, Pamela Coburn, Hartmut Welker, Martin Blasius, Victor von Halem, Birgit Calm, Gabriele Maria Ronge; Hessischer Rundfunk Youth Chorus; hr-Sinfonieorchester; Gerd Albrecht, conductor.
- EMI 7243 5 570872 4: Patricia Racette, Susan B. Anthony, David Kuebler, Iride Martinez, Andreas Schmidt, Zelotes Edmund Toliver, Michael Volle, Lothar Odinus, Natalie Karl, Machiko Obata; Gürzenich-Orchester Kölner Philharmoniker; conducted by James Conlon.
