= Ioan Holender =

Austrian opera singer and opera manager

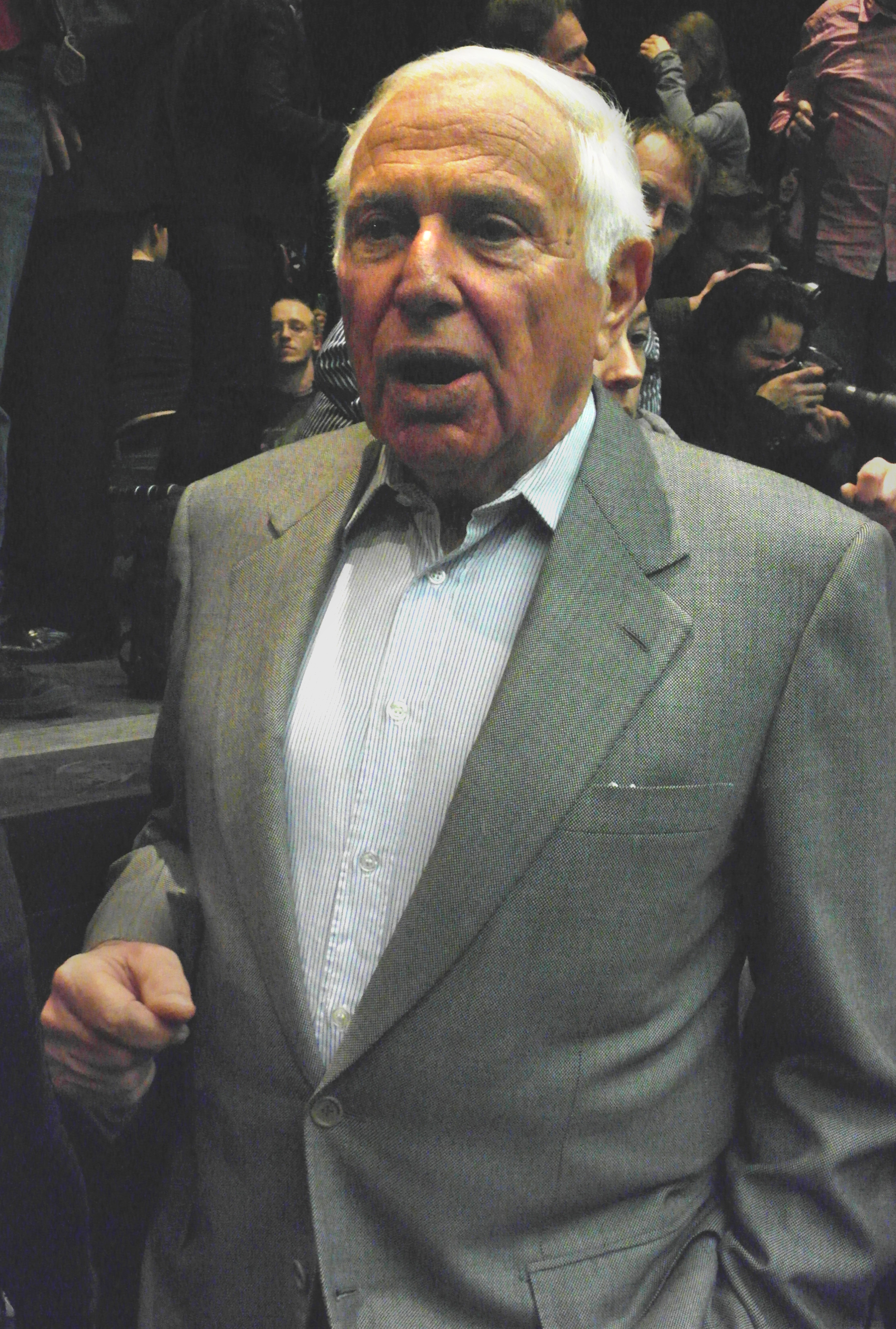
- Holender in 2011
- Born: 18 July 1935 (age 90); Timișoara, Romania
- Occupations: Operatic baritone; General manager
- Organizations: Vienna State Opera
- Children: 3, including Liviu Holender
- Awards: Austrian Cross of Honour for Science and Art; Order of Arts and Letters; Order of the Star of Romania; Order of Merit of the Italian Republic; Order of the Rising Sun; Great Cross of Merit of the Federal Republic of Germany

Ioan Holender (born Johann Hollaender, born 18 July 1935) is a Romanian-born Austrian operatic baritone and administrator.

== Life and career ==
Holender was born in Timișoara, Romania. His family is of Jewish ancestry, and growing up, he spoke three languages. His father owned a factory in Timișoara, which was expropriated in 1948. Holender studied mechanical engineering at the Polytechnic University of Timișoara. He worked as a tennis coach and a director’s assistant until he and his family emigrated to Austria, where his mother was residing. He intended to continue his engineering studies, but became interested in singing. After completing his music studies, he was an operatic baritone and concert singer with the Stadttheater Klagenfurt.

In 1966, he began to work at the Starka Concert Agency, which he eventually took over and whose prestige he increased.

In 1988, Eberhard Waechter named Holender as Secretary-General of the Vienna State Opera, effective as of 1991. Eventually, Holender dissociated himself from the Starka business. After Waechter’s death in February 1992, Holender became director of the Vienna State Opera on 1 April 1992. He also led the Vienna Volksoper for four years simultaneously. Holender’s contract was extended three times and concluded on 31 August 2010. He is the longest-serving general director in the history of the Vienna State Opera.

Ioan Holender is advisor of the Metropolitan Opera in New York City and the Spring Festival Tokyo and artistic director of the George Enescu Festival Bucharest. He is a lecturer at the University of Vienna and at the University for Continuing Education Krems. He is a jury member for several international singing-competitions. He also has his own cultural magazine on the Austrian TV-channel ServusTV.

Holender and his wife have two sons and a daughter; their son Liviu Holender is a baritone.

== Decorations and awards ==
- Honorary Doctorates from the University of Bucharest, West University of Timișoara, the Music Academy of Sofia and Gheorghe Dima Music Academy (Cluj-Napoca)
- Decoration of Honour in Silver for Services to the Republic of Austria (1980)
- Austrian Cross of Honour for Science and Art (1985)
- Decoration of Honour in Gold for Services to the Republic of Austria
- Golden Medal of Honour for Services to the City of Vienna
- Austrian Cross of Honour for Science and Art, 1st class (1995)
- Officer of the Order of Arts and Letters (France, 1999)
- Collars of the Order of the Star of Romania (2001)
- Jacob Prandtauer Prize for Art and Science of St. Pölten (2001)
- Grand Gold Decoration for Services to the Republic of Austria (2002)
- Commander of the Order of Merit of the Italian Republic (2004)
- Honorary Medal of the Austrian capital Vienna in Gold (2010)
- Clemens Krauss Medal of the Vienna State Opera Chorus
- Franz Schalk Gold Medal of the Vienna Philharmonic
- European Cultural Initiative Award of the European Cultural Foundation Pro Europe (2005)
- Order of the Rising Sun, 3rd Class (Gold Rays with Neck Ribbon) (Japan, 2011)
- Great Cross of Merit of the Federal Republic of Germany (2011)
- Honorary Citizenship of Timișoara

== Bibliography ==
- Holender, Ioan; Arnbom, Marie-Therese (2001). Der Lebensweg des Wiener Staatsoperndirektors. Wien: Böhlau Verlag. ISBN 3-205-99384-5.
