= Markus Poschner =

German conductor

- Poschner in 2026
- Born: February 1, 1971 (age 55); Munich, Bavaria, Germany
- Education: University of Music and Performing Arts Munich
- Occupations: Conductor; Pianist; Academic teacher
- Organizations: Theater Bremen; Orchestra della Svizzera Italiana; Bruckner Orchestra Linz; University of Bremen; Utah Symphony; Vienna Radio Symphony Orchestra
- Awards: Deutscher Dirigentenpreis; International Classical Music Awards
- Website: www.markusposchner.de

Markus Poschner (born 1 February 1971) is a German conductor and pianist.

== Biography ==
Born in Munich, Poschner studied at the University of Music and Performing Arts Munich with Hermann Michael. His mentors and supporters included Sir Roger Norrington, Sir Colin Davis and Jorma Panula.

From 2000 to 2006, Poschner was chief conductor of the Georgisches Kammerorchester Ingolstadt. He has also been first Kapellmeister of the Komische Oper Berlin. From 2007 to 2017, Poschner was Generalmusikdirektor (GMD) of the city of Bremen, which encompassed chief conductorships of the Bremer Philharmoniker and of the Theater Bremen.

Poschner became chief conductor of the Orchestra della Svizzera Italiana with the 2015-2016 season. He became chief conductor of the Bruckner Orchestra Linz as of the 2017-2018 season. He is scheduled to conclude his tenure with the Bruckner Orchester Linz in 2027. In February 2023, the Sinfonieorchester Basel announced the appointment of Poschner as its next chief conductor, effective with the 2025–2026 season. In February 2025, the Vienna Radio Symphony Orchestra (RSO Wien) announced the appointment of Poschner as its next chief conductor, effective with the 2026-2027 season, subject to whether stable funding for the future of the orchestra is secured prior to that time.

In 2024, Poschner conducted Zemlinsky's Der Traumgörge at the Oper Frankfurt, directed by Tilmann Köhler, with AJ Glueckert in the title role, Zuzana Marková as Gertraud, Magdalena Hinterdobler as Grete and Liviu Holender as Hans. He claimed that this was the first unabridged production of the complete music on stage of the 1907 opera that was first performed in 1980.

Outside of Europe, Poschner has served as principal guest conductor of the Orquesta Sinfonica de Chile. Poschner is also known as a jazz pianist. In December 2022, Poschner first guest-conducted the Utah Symphony. He returned for a subsequent guest-conducting appearance in November 2023. In November 2024, the Utah Symphony announced the appointment of Poschner as its next music director, effective with the 2027-2028 season. Poschner took the title of music director-designate with immediate effect.

Poschner and his wife Elvira have three children. Since 2010, he is an honorary professor at the University of Bremen, where he teaches courses in musicology and music education.

== Awards and honours ==
- 2004: Winner of the Deutscher Dirigentenpreis
- 2018: Winner of the ICMA International Classical Music Awards with the Orchestra della Svizzera Italiana in the Category DVD PERFORMANCE for Rereading Brahms – Brahms: The Symphonies (Sony Classical)

Cultural offices
Preceded by Lawrence Renes	Chief Conductor, Bremer Philharmoniker; 2007–2017	Succeeded by Marko Letonja
Preceded by Alain Lombard	Principal Conductor, Orchestra della Svizzera Italiana; 2015–present	Succeeded by incumbent
Preceded by Dennis Russell Davies	Chief Conductor, Bruckner Orchestra Linz; 2017–present	Succeeded by incumbent
Preceded by Marin Alsop	Chief Conductor, Vienna Radio Symphony Orchestra; 2026–present	Succeeded by incumbent
