= Ursula Wendt-Walther =

German operatic soprano (1934–2016)

- Born: Ursula Wendt; 13 March 1934/1939; Berlin
- Died: 11 April 2016 (aged 82); Nuremberg
- Education: Musikhochschule Berlin
- Occupation: Operatic soprano
- Organizations: Staatstheater Nürnberg
- Spouse: Wolf Walther (19??–1997; his death)

Ursula Wendt-Walther (13 March 1934/1939 (Note: In many bibliographical reference works including Kutsch/Riemens, the year of birth is given as 1939. It conflicts with contracts at the Theater Nürnberg, ending at age 60 for female members. Therefore, 1934 is assumed as the year of birth, which also matches the obituary of Deutsche Bühne in April 2016, according to which Wendt-Walther died "at the age of 82".) – 11 April 2016) was a German operatic soprano. She was a member of the Staatstheater Nürnberg for decades, where she performed leading roles by Mozart, Strauss and Wagner. In contemporary opera, she appeared as Marie in Bernhard Zimmermann's Die Soldaten, and created the role of Marei in Zemlinsky's Der Traumgörge.

== Life and career ==
Ursula Wendt was born in Berlin, the daughter of insurance director Hugo Wendt. She studied at the Musikhochschule Berlin She also took private lessons with Finnish baritone Kari Nurmela in Zürich. Wendt was a member of the Staatstheater Hannover in 1956–1958, the following season at the Theater Rheydt, followed by a year at the Luzerner Theater. She had her first engagement as a lead singer from 1960 until 1963 at the Landestheater Detmold where she made her debut in the title role of Verdi's La traviata. In the 1964/65 season, Wendt appeared as a guest at the Württembergische Landesbühne Esslingen. Further engagements followed at the Staatstheater Mainz in the 1965/66 season and at the Stadttheater Bremerhaven from 1966 to 1970.

=== Staatstheater Nürnberg ===
At the beginning of the 1970/71 season Wendt-Walther joined the Staatstheater Nürnberg as a permanent member of the ensemble, to which she belonged for almost 25 years without interruption until her retirement in 1994. Her first role was Marcelline in Beethoven's Fidelio. Wendt-Walther performed more than 60 roles at the theatre, from Monteverdi to contemporary opera. She excelled in Mozart characters, including Fiordiligi in Così fan tutte, Donna Elvira in Don Giovanni, and Pamina in Die Zauberflöte. Wendt-Walther's signature roles included Eva in Wagner's Die Meistersinger von Nürnberg, Desdemona in Verdi's Otello, the title role of Puccini's Tosca, the Marschallin in Der Rosenkavalier and the title role of Arabella, both by Richard Strauss.

Wendt-Walther appeared in several operettas, as Rosalinde in Die Fledermaus by Johann Strauss, as Laura in Millöcker's Der Bettelstudent, as Saffi in Der Zigeunerbaron by Johann Strauss, as Marie in Zeller's Der Vogelhändler, in the title role of Lehárs Die lustige Witwe, and as Lisa in his Das Land des Lächelns. In April 1994, she appeared for the last time on the opera stage, as Senta in Wagner's Der fliegende Holländer.

=== Contemporary opera ===
Wendt-Walther was committed to singing contemporary opera, including Marie in Bernhard Zimmermann's Die Soldaten in 1974. She created the role of Marei in the world premiere of Zemlinsky's Der Traumgörge on 11 October 1980. In the 1980/81 season, Wendt-Walther appeared as Miss Wordsworth in Britten's Albert Herring, staged by Uwe Kreyssig. In March 1982, she performed the role of Regan in Aribert Reimann's Lear. She sang in operas by Hans Werner Henze, Hans Zender and Wolfgang Rihm.

=== Guest performances ===
Wendt-Walther gave guest performances at the Vienna State Opera, the Deutsche Oper am Rhein, at the Nationaltheater Mannheim, the Staatstheater Hannover, the Staatstheater Wiesbaden, the Staatstheater am Gärtnerplatz and the Theater Basel, among others. She was also active as a concert singer. In April 1977 she appeared at La Fenice in Venice in several performances as voice of the falcon and guardian of the threshold of the temple in the Strauss' opera Die Frau ohne Schatten. In June 1978 she played at an operetta concert in The Hague. -->

=== Private life ===
Ursula Wendt was married to actor Wolf Walther, who died in 1997. She spent her later years in Schwarzenbruck, Bavaria, and died on 11 April 2016, aged 82.
