= Marvin Goldstein =

American musician (born 1950)

Marvin Goldstein (born 1950) is an acclaimed professional pianist and performer.

== Background ==
Goldstein began musical training at age 9, learning the accordion and piano, followed by the French horn when he was 12. At 18, he was awarded a music scholarship to Tel Aviv University School of Music, Tel Aviv, Israel. He continued his formal training at the famed "Mozarteum" of Salzburg, Austria and completed his education with Bachelor and Master of Music degrees at Florida State University (FSU) in Tallahassee, Florida.

Goldstein and his wife Lenae are the parents of one child. Goldstein converted from Judaism to The Church of Jesus Christ of Latter Day Saints in 1985. One of the people who worked with him in teaching him of the faith before he joined the Church was Robert Millet.

== Performing ==
From 1972 to 1977, while a student at FSU's School of Music, Goldstein performed as "The Marv Allen Combo" in Tallahassee's lounge and cocktail circuit. He performed with local jazz drummer Paul Rosete, bassist Carl Cerniglia, percussionist George Rosete, and saxophonists Jodie Coogle and Michael Wallace. As a sought out lounge act, the Combo's performances were frequently augmented by local singers, such as Sarah Copeland, Carol Smith, and soprano Linda Zoghby. Goldstein was part owner of a local music store called Music World.

Goldstein has traveled extensively, performing in such places as Jerusalem, Anchorage, Oahu, Copenhagen, London, and throughout Canada and the continental United States. He performs as a soloist and as an accompanist. He has also been the headline talent for tour groups ships sailing on the Caribbean Sea, the Mediterranean Sea, and the Pacific Ocean.

Goldstein ushered in the new millennium in the Salt Lake Tabernacle in Salt Lake City on New Year's Eve 1999 (one year early).

Goldstein has also been a presenter for Brigham Young University (BYU) Education Week, as well as presenting at BYU-Hawaii, BYU-Idaho and the BYU Jerusalem Center.

In November 2003, he headlined a showcase concert at the Venetian Hotel Showroom in Las Vegas, Nevada. The same year, he established the Peace Through Music Foundation, aiming to bring together through music people who would not normally meet.

From 1995, Goldstein hosted concerts in Israel with equal numbers of Jewish and Arabic singers, as a way of promoting peace. Some of the concerts raised money for a kindergarten attended by both Jewish and Arabic children. He also performed in concerts in southern California with Israeli singer Gali Atari and Arabic singer Najwa Gibran.

Goldstein plays many styles of music, including pop, show tunes, soul, R&B, country, patriotic, gospel, and the classics. He has played soul with Thurl Bailey and Pam Laws, spiritual with the Tabernacle Choir at Temple Square and even country with Billy Dean. He has a way of drawing the audience into the piece as they experience the emotion that it invokes. He can make the piano come alive when he is playing. One song you will be moved to tears and the next he will have you in burst-out-laughter.

== Recording and publishing ==
Goldstein has recorded over 40 compact discs including popular music, patriotic melodies, show tunes, sacred music and love songs. He recently released a CD with Grammy winner Billy Dean and former NBA star Thurl Bailey. Goldstein has also arranged 15 piano solo music books.
