= Liviu Holender =

Austrian baritone

- Born: Vienna
- Education: University of Music and Performing Arts Vienna
- Occupation: Operatic baritone
- Organizations: Oper Frankfurt
- Parent: Ioan Holender
- Website: www.liviuholender.art/about

Liviu Holender is an Austrian operatic baritone, based at the Oper Frankfurt, where he has performed leading roles including the Count in Mozart's Le nozze di Figaro, Henrik in Carl Nielsen's Maskarade and Hans in Zemlinsky's Der Traumgörge. He has appeared internationally. In recital, concert and recording he has focused on Mahler's Des Knaben Wunderhorn and music by other composers of the early 20th century.

== Life and career ==
Holender was born in Vienna, the son of Ioan Holender who was for years director of the Vienna State Opera after a career as a singer; his mother was a dramaturge in Lucerne. As a child he was a member of the opera school for children of the State Opera, singing solo such as the shepherd boy in Puccini's Tosca with Johan Botha as Cavaradossi and Stefan Soltész conducting. He studied clarinet and law in Vienna, and then from 2013 voice at the University of Music and Performing Arts Vienna with Karlheinz Hanser.

Holender became a member of the ensemble of Gärtnerplatztheater in Munich in 2017, where he appeared as Vicomte Cascada in Lehár's Die lustige Witwe and Liviu in the children's opera Ritter Odilo und der strenge Herr Winter. He also performed there as Count Eberbach in Lortzing's Der Wildschütz, Guglielmo (in Mozart's Così fan tutte, Schaunard in Puccini's La bohème and Hans Scholl in Udo Zimmermann's Weiße Rose. In 2018 he portrayed Papageno in a Salzburg Festival production of Mozart's Die Zauberflöte for children.

Holender moved to the ensemble of the Oper Frankfurt in 2019. When the company staged Mozart's Le nozze di Figaro in 2020 during the COVID-19 pandemic in a version adhering to social distancing, Holender appeared as the Count alongside Adriana González as the Countess. A reviewer of this production described the complete ensemble as young, agile, and with flexible voices; he noted that Count and Countess, as an offstage couple, were the only ones holding hands. When Carl Nielsen's Maskarade was played the following year in a new rhymed translation into German staged by Tobias Kratzer, Holender portrayed the servant Henrik, and a reviewer noted that he "wielded a beautifully sonorous baritone in a role that requires both a bel canto-style cantilena line and devilishly fast patter", in "extremely charismatic stage presence".

Holender appeared as Hans in Zemlinsky's Der Traumgörge (Görge the Dreamer) in 2024, directed by Tilmann Köhler and conducted by Markus Poschner. Zemlinsky's work was not performed when it was composed in 1907 at the Vienna State Opera as planned by Gustav Mahler, then the music director, and was revived only in 1980. While the title character Görge is an outsider as a bookworm, dreamer and intellectual, Grete whom he is supposed to marry, and Hans, his rival, are village people who do not comprehend him. They were portrayed by Magdalena Hinterdobler and Holender with "resolute voices and acting".

Internationally, Holender portrayed Mozart's Almaviva at the Latvian National Opera, and performed as Marullo in Verdi's Rigoletto at the 2019 Bregenz Festival 2019, and as Silvio in Leoncavallo's Pagliacci and Almaviva at the Romanian National Opera, Bucharest. He appeared at La Scala in Milan as Silvano in a new production of Verdi's Un ballo in maschera in 2022, conducted by Giampaolo Bisanti.

In concert, Holender was in 2023 the voice of Jesus in Bach's St Matthew Passion at the Konzerthaus in Vienna, with Julian Prégardien as the Evangelist, the Arnold Schoenberg Chor, the children's choir of the Vienna State Opera and the Vienna Philharmonic conducted by Franz Welser-Möst. Holender recorded excerpts from Mahler's Des Knaben Wunderhorn with pianist Juliette Journaux; they gave concerts with the program at the Musée d'Orsay, among others. He chose some of them for a recital at the Ehrbar Hall in Vienna in March 2023 in a selection of works to German texts by Schubert, Brahms, Strauss and Mahler, aware that Mahler's Das klagende Lied had been premiered at the hall. A reviewer wrote that his strong voice of an interesting timbre had a wide range between a sonorous depth and a "golden" brilliant high register, and that he combined secure technique and breath control with a "dramatic" temperament. Holender was the soloist in Mahler's Lieder eines fahrenden Gesellen with the National Radio Orchestra of Romania conducted by Sascha Goetzel, between Don Juan by Strauss and Tchaikovsky's Fifth Symphony in October 2023, aired within Europe. He combined some of the Mahler Wunderhorn songs in a recital at Oper Frankfurt in April 2024 with lieder by other composers whose music was banned by the Nazis, Franz Schreker, Zemlinsky, Erich Korngold, concluding with Schönberg's Zwei Gesänge, Op. 1. A reviewer noted that he achieved to give the songs individual character, using varied tonal colours of his warmly grounded baritone voice.
