= Karl Michael von Levetzow =

German author

Karl Michael von Levetzow (10 April 1871, Dobromilice – 4 October 1945, Mírov) was a Moravian German poet and librettist.

== Librettos ==
- Ruth. Ein Hirtenlied in 5 Bildern in Neuversen. Divak, Mähren 1919
- Scirocco. Oper in 3 Akten . Eugen d'Albert 1919, premiered 1921 Darmstadt
- Der goldene Pfad. Eine Botschaft der Liebe und Selbstentäußerung Wiener Literarische Anstalt, Vienna 1921
- Die schwarze Orchidee. Oper in 3 Akten. Musik: Eugen d'Albert premiered 1928 Leipzig
- Mister Wu. Oper in 3 Akten. Eugen d'Albert Leo Blech. premiered 1932 Dresden
- Der goldene Schlüssel. Singspiel in 3 Akten. for Hannes Sieber, Heyer, Berlin 1933
- Enoch Arden, Ottmar Gerster 1936
