= Heldenbaritone =

Type of opera singer's voice

A Heldenbaritone, also known as dramatic bass-baritone or hoher bass (high bass), is a voice type in German opera, a specific dramatic baritone.

"Heldenbaritone" (Ger. "Heroic baritone) is a fach (operatic voice type) that is usually associated with the operas of Richard Wagner. It is usually sung by bass-baritones such as Hans Hotter, Theo Adam or Bryn Terfel. Wagner himself calls this voice type "Hoher Bass" (high bass) rather than baritone. In his opera scores he distinguishes between the two so that Wolfram in "Tannhäuser" is labelled "Bariton", whereas Wotan in "Die Walküre" is called "Hoher Bass". Wolfram is a much more lyrical part than Wotan, and normally the same singer would not have both parts on his repertoire.

Heldenbaritone parts are different from dramatic baritone parts in Italian operas (such as Scarpia in Puccini's "Tosca" or Iago in Verdi's "Otello") in that the Italian parts have a much higher tessitura and the vocal line is much more like that of a dramatic tenor, whereas the Wagner Heldenbariton is in effect a bass singer with a high register and only occasionally stretches to the high notes of the dramatic Italian baritone. Other Heldenbaritone parts include Kaspar in Weber's "Der Freischütz", Jochanaan in Strauss' "Salome" and the title role in Verdi's "Falstaff".

== See also ==
- Heldentenor
