= Dehnberger Hoftheater =

Coordinates: 49°32′15″N 11°17′09″E

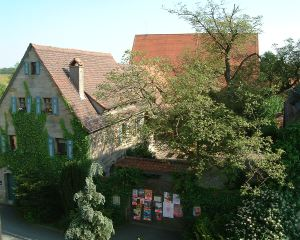
An image of Dehnberger Hoftheater

Dehnberger Hoftheater is a theatre in Lauf an der Pegnitz, Franconia.
