= Blistrup =

- Village
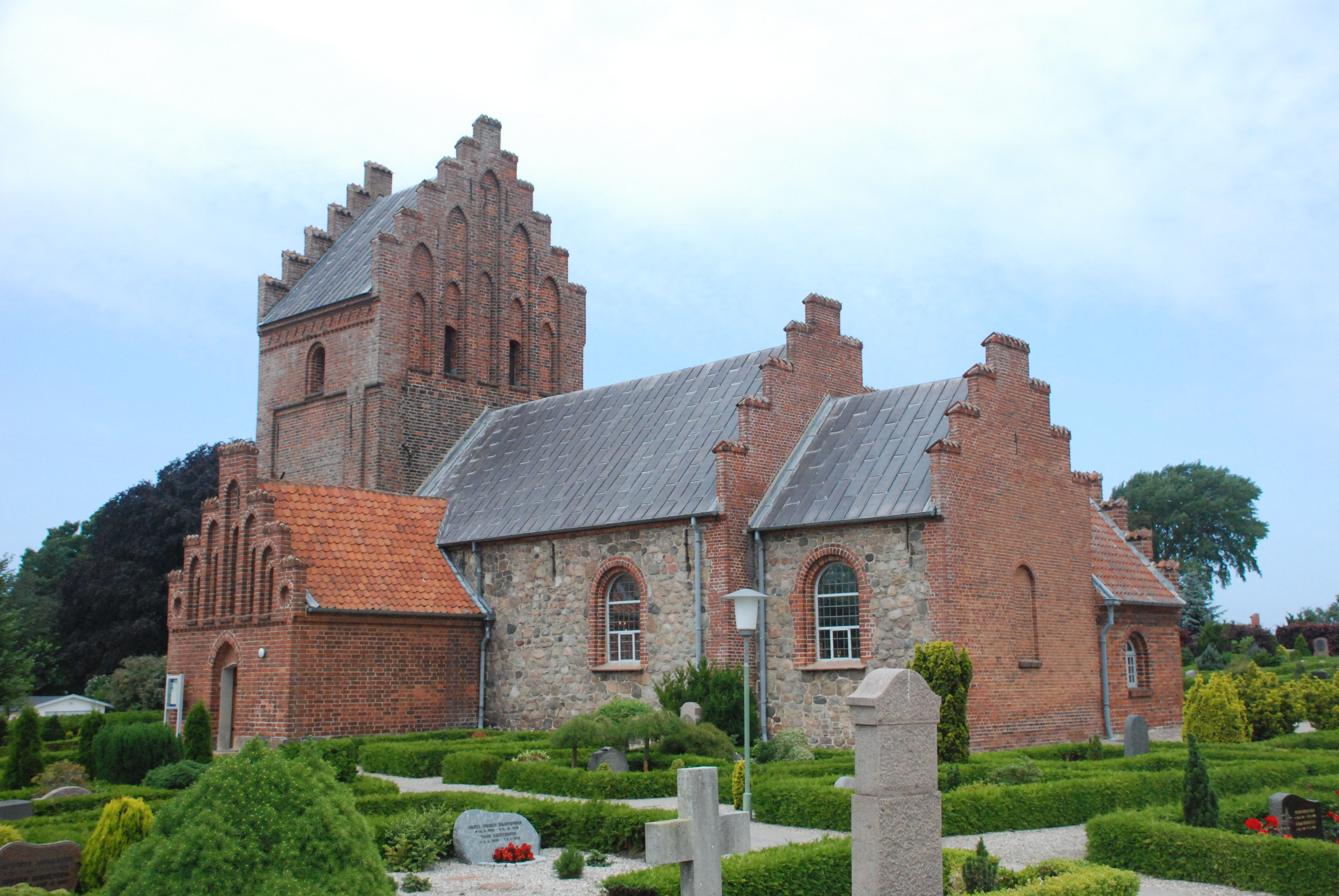
- Blistrup Church, built in 1140

- Location within Denmark Location within Capital Region
- Coordinates: 56°05′22″N 12°12′28″E
- Country: Denmark
- Region: Capital (Hovedstaden)
- Municipality: Gribskov

Area
  - Urban: 0.94 km^{2} (0.36 sq mi)

Population (2026)
  - Urban: 1,134
  - Urban density: 1,200/km^{2} (3,100/sq mi)

Blistrup is a town in the Gribskov Municipality in North Zealand, Denmark. As of 2026, it has a population of 1,134.
