= Uwe Kreyssig =

German opera singer and director (1930–2008)

- Born: Uwe Christian Kreyssig; 28 September 1930; Chemnitz, Saxony, Weimar Republic
- Died: 17 May 2008 (aged 77); Havelsee, Brandenburg, Germany
- Occupations: Baritone; opera director; television presenter
- Style: Classical; opera

Uwe Christian Kreyssig (28 September 1930, Chemnitz – 17 May 2008, Havelsee) was a German operatic baritone, opera director and television presenter.

== Bibliography ==
- Karl-Josef Kutsch, Leo Riemens: Großes Sängerlexikon. Vierte, extended and updated edition. Munich 2003. Volume 4: Kainz–Menkes. p. 2512. ISBN 3-598-11598-9.
- Wilhelm Kosch (editor): Deutsches Theaterlexikon. Nachtragsband, Part 3. K – L. De Gruyter, Berlin. p. 206. December 2014. ISBN 978-3-11-031137-2.
