= Sebastian Feiersinger =

Austrian operatic tenor

Sebastian Feiersinger (5 May 1913, in Kirchbichl – 2 September 1984, in Nuremberg) was an Austrian operatic tenor, particularly associated with the German repertory.

He studied at the Vienna Music Academy with Hans Duhan and Josef von Manowarda. He made his debut in Heilbronn in 1939, and then played in Gablonz (1940–41), Saarbrücken (1941–43), then the war interrupted his career which he resumed in Salzburg (1945–47) and Innsbruck (1947–49), he returned to Saarbrücken (1949–51), then went on to Wiesbaden (1951–53), Graz (1953–54), and finally joined the Nuremberg Opera in 1954, where he remained until 1975.

During the 1958–59 season he made his debut at both the San Francisco Opera in the title role of Tannhäuser, and at the Metropolitan Opera in New York, as Walther in Die Meistersinger von Nürnberg, to considerable acclaim, and in 1963 at the Lyric Opera of Chicago as Tristan in Tristan und Isolde.

He also appeared at La Scala in Milan, the Paris Opéra, the Vienna State Opera, the Zurich Opera, the Monte Carlo Opera, La Monnaie in Brussels, the San Carlo in Naples, etc. Other notable roles included; Florestan, Max, Huon, Siegmund, Aegisth, The Emperor, he was also admired in some Italian roles notably Riccardo, Radames, Otello, Canio, Cavaradossi, and also enjoyed success in French roles such as Faust and Hoffmann.

Feiersinger sang character roles at the Staatstheater am Gärtnerplatz in Munich beginning in 1972 until his retirement in 1976.

== Selected recording ==
- 1952 – Puccini – Le Villi – Maud Cunitz, Sebastian Feiersinger, Kurt Gester – Frankfurt Radio Chorus and Orchestra, Paul Schmidtz – Walhall (sung in German)
- 1953 – Janáček – Jenůfa – Trude Eipperle, Aga Joesten, Franz Fehringer, Sebastian Feiersinger – Frankfurt Radio Chorus and Orchestra, Paul Schmidtz – Walhall (sung in German)
- 1955 – Verdi – Un ballo in maschera – Birgit Nilsson, Sebastian Feiersinger, Josef Metternich, Jean Madeira, Erika Koth – Bavarian Radio Chorus and Orchestra, Alberto Erede – Walhall (sung in German)

== Sources ==
- Operissimo.com
