= Münchner Volkstheater =

Theater in Munich, Germany

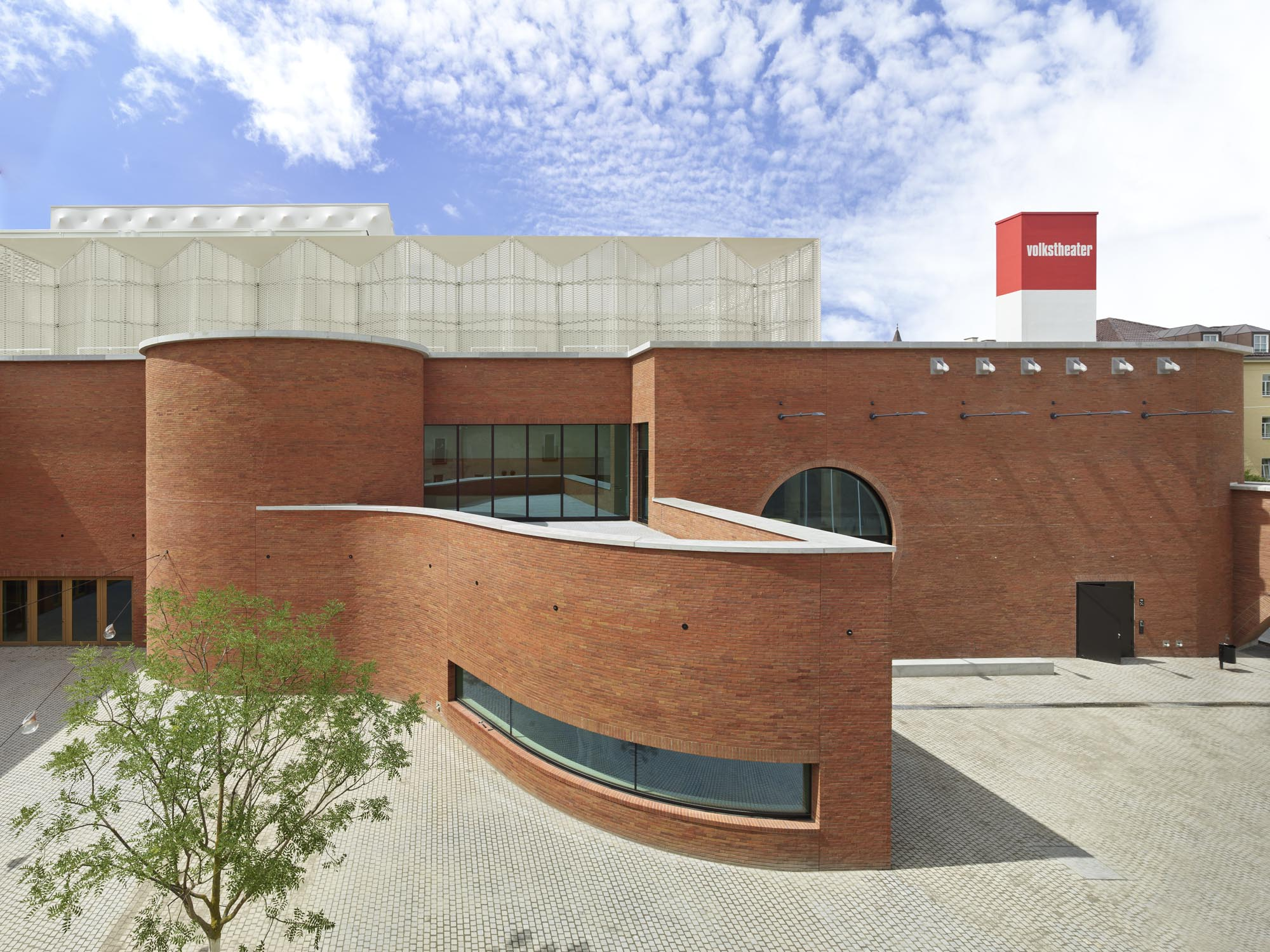
Münchner Volkstheater Münchner Volkstheater
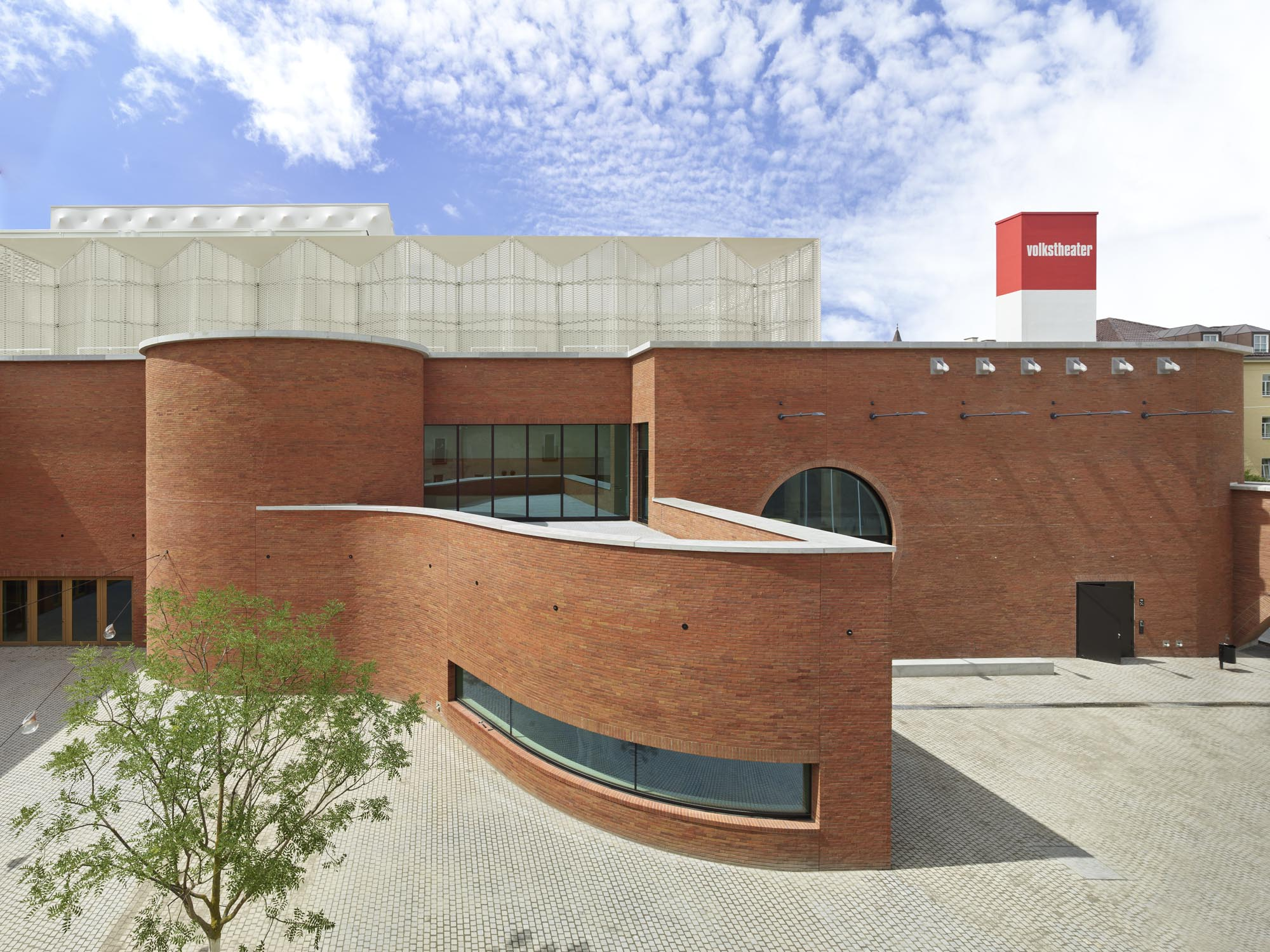
- Interactive map of Münchner Volkstheater Münchner Volkstheater
- Address: Tumblingerstraße 29, 80337 München; Munich, Germany
- Coordinates: 48°12′41″N 11°55′58″E

Construction
- Opened: 1903
- Rebuilt: 1955 rebuilt 1983 rebuilt 2021
- Years active: 1903 - present

Website
- https://www.muenchner-volkstheater.de

Münchner Volkstheater, or Munich People's Theater, is a company based in the Bavarian capital and operated by the cultural office of the city government. Its original performing home opened in 1903. This was rebuilt in 1955, in 1983 and finally in 2021. It now can hold over 800 spectators. Since 2002, Christian Stückl has served as the company's Intendant.

== Old building ==
In 1903, the architects Gerstenecker and Tittrich in the Josephspitalstraße in the district Altstadt-Lehel, designed and built a reinforced concrete constructed building. It opened with Schiller's Kabale und Liebe (Intrigue and Love). It had about 1000 seats.

Then actress Elise Aulinger received her first theatre engagement here. The first performance took place on 10 November 1903. The manager initially was actor Ernst Schrumpf. Administratively, Wilhelm Braun assisted him. A report in the Munich Ratsch-Kathl from November 16, 1904, it can be seen that the theater had already gained recognition in Germany a year later. At this time, the 54th play was played at the house.

Since 1907, the actor Rolf Pinegger was engaged, who remained loyal to the Volkstheater throughout his life. After the First World War, (actor and playwright) Ernst Bach was director of the theater. On 25 December 1921, the theatre hosted a performance of Bach and Franz Arnold's farce Der keusche Lebemann (or "The chaste bon vivant").

In 1932, Ludwig Schmid-Wildy became the head of the theater, which was still privately run at that time. From 1934 to 1938, Ferdinand Dörfler worked here as an actor, tenant and director. From 1933 to 1941, Willy Rösner belonged to the ensemble of the Volkstheater. It was then destroyed by bombs during World War II.

== Rebuilding 1983 ==
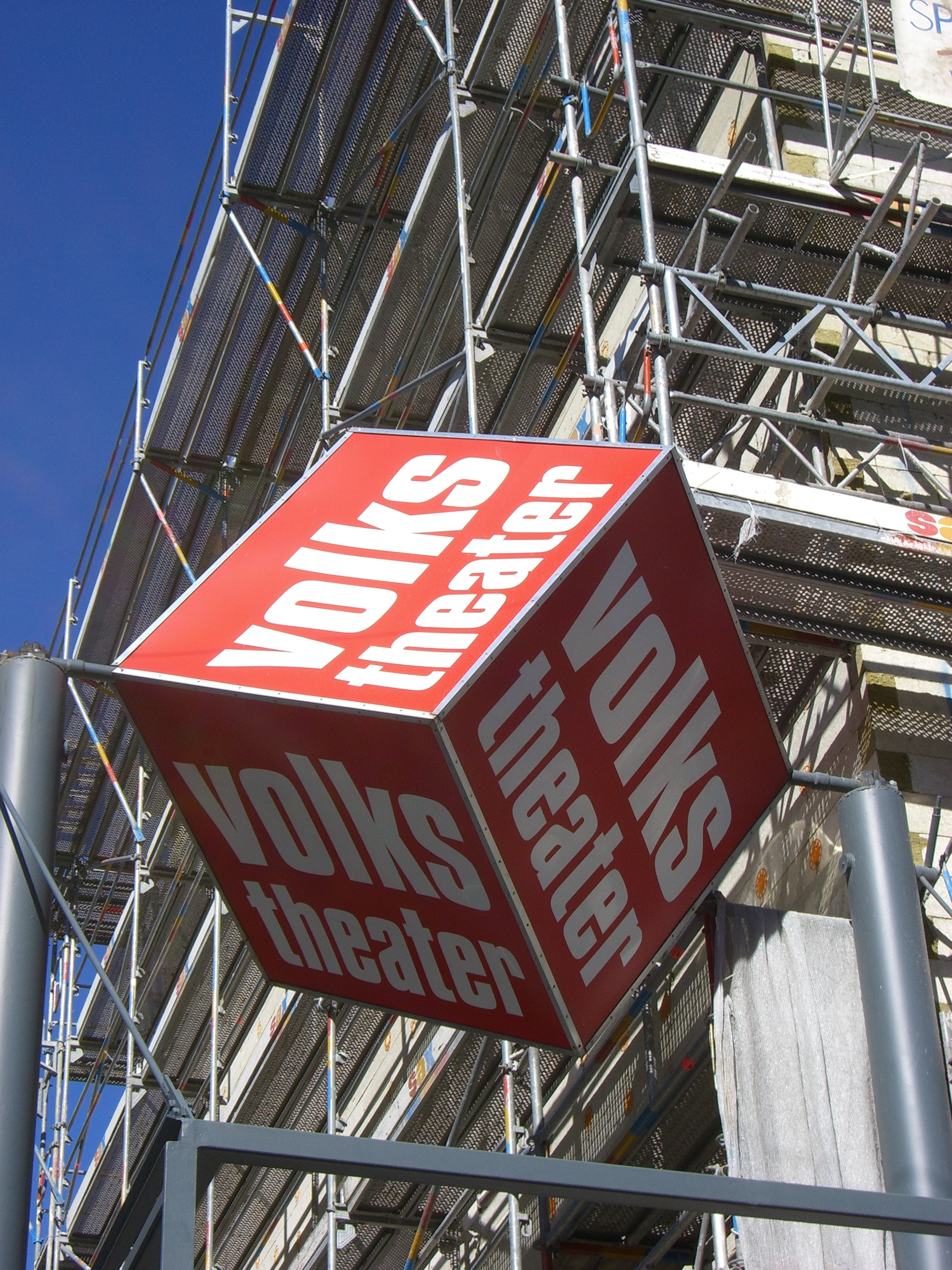

The theater was rebuilt in Brienner Straße in 1955, originally as a multipurpose hall in the 'Haus der Sports'. It was then rebuilt in 1983 as the current Volkstheater and now can hold 609 spectators. Much of the cost of 3.9 million marks was borne by public donations in addition to urban support. At the opening, on 24 November 1983, Ruth Drexel staged the play 'Glaube und Heimat' ("Belief and home", 1910) by Karl Schönherr. The first director was Jörg-Dieter Haas from 1983 to 1988. The ensemble consisted of a group of well-known folk actors (e.g. Gustl Bayrhammer, Beppo Brem, Helmut Fischer, Willy Harlander, Karl Obermayr, Enzi Fuchs, Rita Russek, Maria Singer, Peter Thom and Michael Lerchenberg). In 1989, the "Nachtkastl", a variable platform pedestal with 120 seats, was added as a further venue. From 1988 to 2002, Ruth Drexel ran the house, interrupted by a short interim period by Hanns Christian Müller from 1998 to 1999.

The program included especially the classics of South German-Austrian dialect literature, as well as works by the non-German Volkstheater tradition, but also pieces by Goethe ("Faust"), Schiller, Shakespeare ("Romeo and Juliet" and "Midsummer Night's Dream"), Molière, Brecht and others.

In 2002, Christian Stückl became artistic director, who became known mainly through his productions of the Oberammergau Passion Play in 1990 and 2000. With a young ensemble and up-and-coming directors, the Volkstheater was able to gain a new profile within the theater scene and at times achieved almost 90 percent seat occupancy.

Since 2005, 'Radikal jung' - The Festival of Young Directors takes place once a year.

Since 2006, the Munich Volkstheater publishes the magazine "Volksmund" once a year instead of a season magazine. The 2007/08 issue was described as a "ravishingly funny" (by tz) and a new discovery with a "feuilletonist claim" (Münchner Merkur).

In 2013, The Kurt Wilhelm's play "Brandner Kaspar and Eternal Life" had its 250th performance with 170,000 visitors. It had its premiere on 30 March 2005 at the Volkstheater. Then by 2019, it had 300 sold-out houses, with an ensemble cast (in 2019) of Maximilian Brückner, Markus Brandl, Susanne Brückner, Ursula Maria Burkhart, Tobias van Dieken, Alexander Duda, Peter Mitterrutzner, Stefan Murr, Hubert Schmid, Hans Schuler, Kathrin von Steinburg and Young Riederinger musicians.

== New building ==
In 2012 multiple investigations and surveys showed that a thorough reconstruction of the building in the Brienner Straße is necessary. The theater building had multiple errors. Too little space for storage, workshop and rehearsal rooms. The Volkstheater had to store the stage designs outside Munich in 40 containers and had to rent (out) rehearsal spaces. Adding to the problems: the theatre wasn't accessible for visitors with disabilities, a fly system / fly loft and a garage was missing, also fire prevention needed improvement. The Münchner Stadtrat, city council of Munich decided (with one vote against it) in December 2017 that the Volkstheater should get a new building.

Following a contest, the architecture office LRO Lederer Ragnarsdóttir Oei got to plan and finish the project with the general contractor company Georg Reisch. The Reisch firm signed a contract stating to finish the project with the agreed upon cost until the pre-agreed deadline. The theatre was being built until 2021, cost 130.7 million euros with 18,000 square metres on the Viehhofgelände. Christian Stückl opened the doors of the new Volkstheater with his production of “Edward II.” on the 15th of October 2021.
