= Gail Varina Gilmore =

American Gospel and opera singer (born 1950)

Gail Gilmore
- Born: Gail Varina Gilmore; September 21, 1950; Washington, D.C.
- Education: Xavier University of New Orleans; Indiana University at Bloomington
- Occupation: Operatic mezzo-soprano

Gail Varina Gilmore (born September 21, 1950 in Washington, D.C.) is an American Gospel and (mezzo-soprano) opera singer. She is particularly known for her interpretation of Kundry in Wagner's Parsifal.

== Biography ==
Gail Gilmore, born in Washington, D.C., grew up in New Orleans. She completed her undergraduate degree at the Xavier University of New Orleans with a Bachelor of Music in 1972. Two years later, at the music department of the Indiana University at Bloomington, she received a Masters in Music. The same year, the then-24-year-old singer launched her stage career in Europe, specifically in Germany.

Gail Gilmore became immediately noticeable because of her exceptional musical talent, acting ability, and the unmistakable dark vocal timbre of her voice. She made her debut in Europe at the Stadttheater Gießen as Eboli in Verdi's Don Carlos. She was then engaged at the Stadttheater Krefeld where she performed mainly trousers roles, such as Cherubino in Mozart's Le nozze di Figaro, Hänsel in Humperdinck's Hänsel und Gretel and the title role in Der Rosenkavalier by Richard Strauss. In Krefeld, she also appeared as Brangäne in Wagner's Tristan und Isolde. From 1979 to 1982, Gilmore was a member of the ensemble of the Hessisches Staatstheater Wiesbaden. Under the guidance of the Generalmusikdirektor Siegfried Köhler, she appeared successfully as Adriano in Wagner's Rienzi, as Venus in his Tannhäuser, and again as Eboli.

In 1982, Gilmore responded to a call from the Nürnberg Opera, where she first performed the role of Kundry in Wagner's Parsifal. She was invited as a guest by Michael Gielen of the Frankfurt Opera, and her breakthrough came when she performed the role in the 1982 new production of Parsifal in Frankfurt, staged by Ruth Berghaus. She joined the Frankfurt ensemble in 1985, and appeared as Kundry alongside Peter Hofmann at La Fenice in Venice, and at the Metropolitan Opera in New York City.

At the Metropolitan Opera, she performed with James Levine, as Venus in Tannhäuser, as Fricka in Die Walküre, and as the Composer in Ariadne auf Naxos by Richard Strauss. She appeared at the Arena di Verona as Ulrica in Verdi's Un ballo in maschera, as Amneris in Aida, and in the title role of Bizet's Carmen alongside José Carreras.

Gilmore has a repertory of over 40 roles, including Ortrud in Wagner's Lohengrin, Lady Macbeth in Verdi's Macbeth, and the title roles in Othmar Schoeck's Penthesilea and in Carl Orff's Antigonae. Her voice teacher, Rudolf Bautz, encouraged her to use her range of more than three-and-a-half octaves also for higher dramatic soprano roles, such as Leonore in Beethoven's Fidelio, and the title roles of Elektra and Salome by Richard Strauss, and of Puccini's Tosca and Turandot. Gilmore has also sung rarely performed operas such as Fosca by Antonio Carlos Gomes, which was first performed at La Scala in Milan in 1873.

In concert, Gilmore has performed the Vier letzte Lieder by Richard Strauss, in Mahler's Third Symphony, in the Alto Rhapsody by Brahms, and Wagner's Wesendonck Lieder.

From the beginning of her career Gilmore gave concerts with piano accompaniment, in which she sang songs by American composers and some arrangements of Gospels and spirituals. In 2002 Gilmore founded the Oldambster Musikfestival in Bellingwolde, the Netherlands and for six years she invited artists from all over the world to participate. The music from this festival extended from opera and musicals to jazz, Gospel and blues.

Starting in 2007 until 2012, Gail Gilmore was teaching at the private music school, SMU in Munich, where she taught voice in the fields of opera, musicals, jazz, pop and Gospel. Since the summer semester of 2010, she has also taught as a guest professor at the University of Applied Sciences Würzburg-Schweinfurt, in the Department of Social Psychology. She lectured on children and youth behavior programs as part of the academic projects on "Musical Therapy for Youths with Behavioral Disturbances, together with Professor Gunter Adams, Head of the Children and Youth Behavior Support Program of Wuerzburg. In addition to that, she has worked closely together with the Dean, Professor Rainer Wiestner, on projects covering the theme of "Re-socialization and Threataening Behavior", combined directly to programs on "Music in Prison" with on-site prison lectures and music demonstrations. There was also the subject of "Freedom and Chains", with the theme of "The History of Slavery", accompanied by examples of subject relevant music. Since 2013 until 2018, Gilmore is teaching Voice at Kreativ Musik Forum in Munich.

Gail Varina Gilmore has been awarded the Honorary Doctorate Degree of Fine Arts from her Alma Mater, Xavier University of Louisiana in New Orleans. The award was presented during the University`s Ninety-Second Annual Commencement Ceremony on May 11, 2019.

== Recordings ==
- Gail Gilmore Sings Famous Opera Arias 1992 (Verdi Records)
- Gail Gilmore sings Gershwin 1993 (Sony)
- Gail Gilmore sings Verdi: Composizioni da camera per canto e pianoforte
- Strauss: Lieder 1996 (Carey)
- Fosca by Antonio Carlos Gomes (Gesamtaufnahme) 1997 (Sudameris)
- Gail Gilmore sings Gospels and Spirituals 1997 (Carey)
- Gail Gilmore: Aria 1999 (Signum)
