= Magdalena Hinterdobler =

German soprano (born 1986)

- Born: 1986 (age 38–39); Straubing, Bavaria, Germany
- Education: University of Music and Theatre Munich; Bayerische Theaterakademie August Everding
- Occupation: Operatic soprano
- Organizations: Leipzig Opera; Oper Frankfurt
- Website: magdalenahinterdobler.com

Magdalena Hinterdobler (born 1986) is a German operatic soprano, based at the Oper Frankfurt, where she has performed leading roles including Eva in Wagner's Die Meistersinger von Nürnberg, Elisabetta in Verdi's Don Carlo and Grete in Zemlinsky's Der Traumgörge. She appeared as Anna in the world premiere of Gerd Kühr's Paradiese at the Leipzig Opera in 2021, and as Chrysothemis in Elektra by Richard Strauss at the Tyrolean State Theatre in 2023.

== Early life and career ==
Hinterdobler was born in Straubing, Bavaria, in 1986. She attended a gymnasium focused on music and was a member of its chamber choir, conducted by Gerold Huber, the father of the pianist Gerold Huber, a notable lied accompanist with whom she later performed. She began voice lessons at age 14. Hinterdobler took part in oratorio performances with the choir, with tours to Italy, and in opera productions, performing demanding roles as a soloist.

She enrolled at the University of Music and Theatre Munich in 2002 as a young student while still going to school, in the class of Erika Wien. She achieved first prize at Jugend musiziert in 2002 and second prize at the Bundeswettbewerb Gesang in Berlin in 2004. She studied voice University of Music and Theatre Munich together with several former members of the Tölzer Knabenchor, and said later in an interview that they brought a spirit of teamwork to the class. She performed with the Munich Chamber Orchestra conducted by Christoph Poppen at age 17, and sang regularly with the Augsburger Kammerorchester and the Niederbayerisches Kammerorchester. She was a soloist in Bach's Mass in B minor with the Orchestra of the Age of Enlightenment as part of the 2008 Landsberger Bachtage.

From 2008 Hinterdobler also studied at the Bayerische Theaterakademie August Everding, voice with Andreas Schmidt, and lied with Helmut Deutsch. She made her debut at the Prinzregententheater with the academy in 2008 as Pepi Pleiniger in Wiener Blut by Johann Strauss, and appeared there in Mozart's La finta giardiniera in another student project. She performed the role of Semele in the Munich premiere of Hasse's Didone abbandonata in 2011, in a collaboration of the academy and the Musikhochschule conducted by Michael Hofstetter and recorded live. In 2014 she starred as Midili Hanum in Leo Fall's Die Rose von Stambul at the Prinzregententheater; when a CD recording of one of the performances was released in 2022, Fanfare called her "the best singer in the cast".

=== Leipzig Opera ===
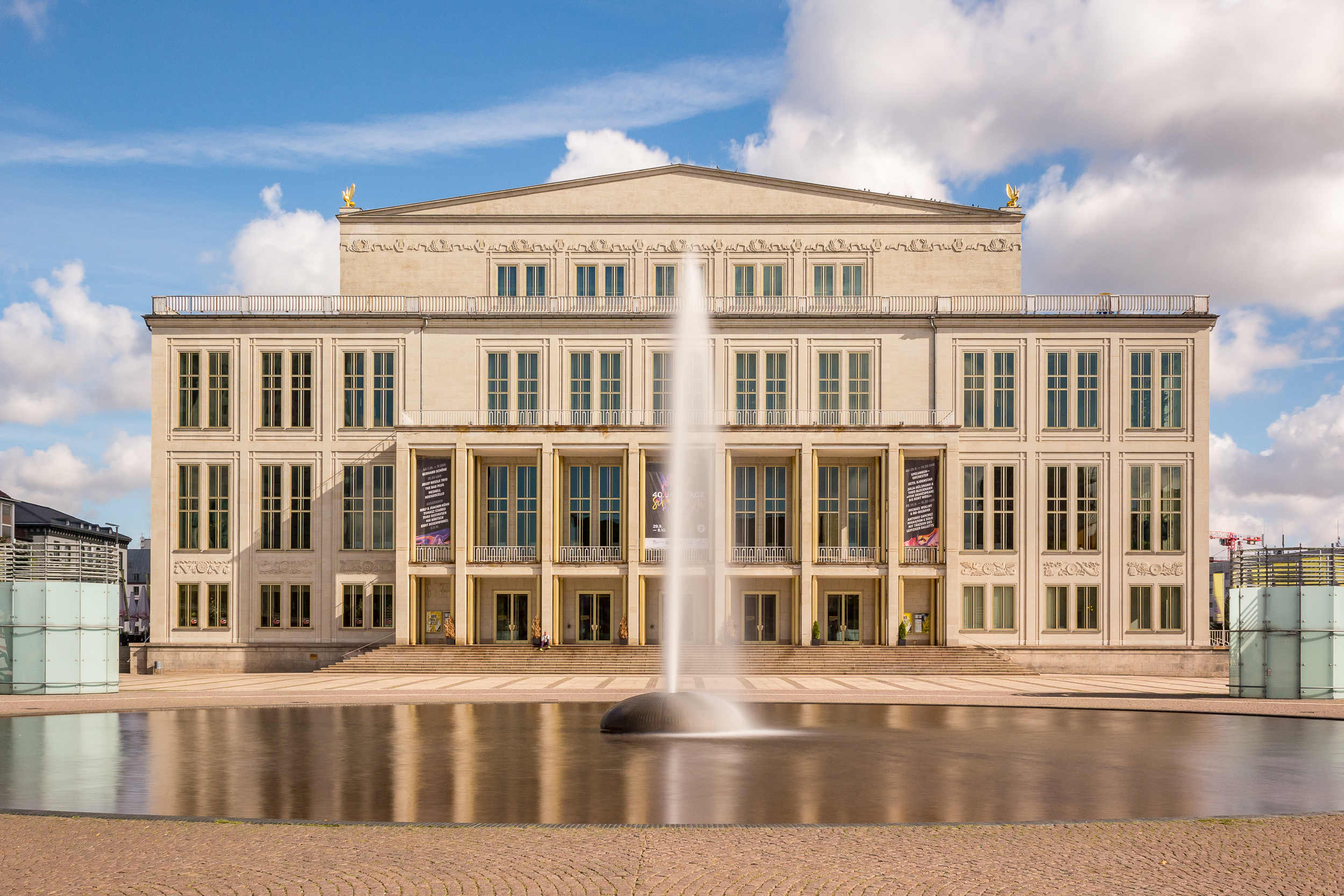
Leipzig Opera building

Hinterdobler became a member of the ensemble of the Leipzig Opera in 2014 and remained with the company until 2022. She appeared there in title role of Dvořák's Rusalka, as Micaëla in Bizet's Carmen, and in some Mozart roles. In 2016 she performed as Zemina in Wagner's early opera Die Feen. She portrayed Ännchen in Weber's Der Freischütz in 2017, and a reviewer described her aria as a "delicious account". In the 2018/19 season she appeared in new productions of Marius Felix Lange's opera for children Schneewittchen and in the title role of Smetana's The Bartered Bride; and performed in revivals, including as Susanna in Mozart's Le nozze di Figaro, Gretel in Humperdinck's Hänsel und Gretel, and Líu in Puccini's Turandot. During the COVID-19 pandemic, she took part in a concert version of Der Ring an einem Abend, a short version of Wagner's Der Ring des Nibelungen by Loriot, conducted by Ulf Schirmer in 2021; she performed as Ortlinde in Die Walküre and as Gutrune in Götterdämmerung in the live-stream. She took part in the world premiere of Gerd Kühr's Paradiese as Anna in July 2021, also conducted by Schirmer; a reviewer from the Süddeutsche Zeitung commented that she filled "the Prenzlauer Berg bourgeois idyll with her colorful, sensual soprano as an erotic elemental force".

=== Oper Frankfurt ===
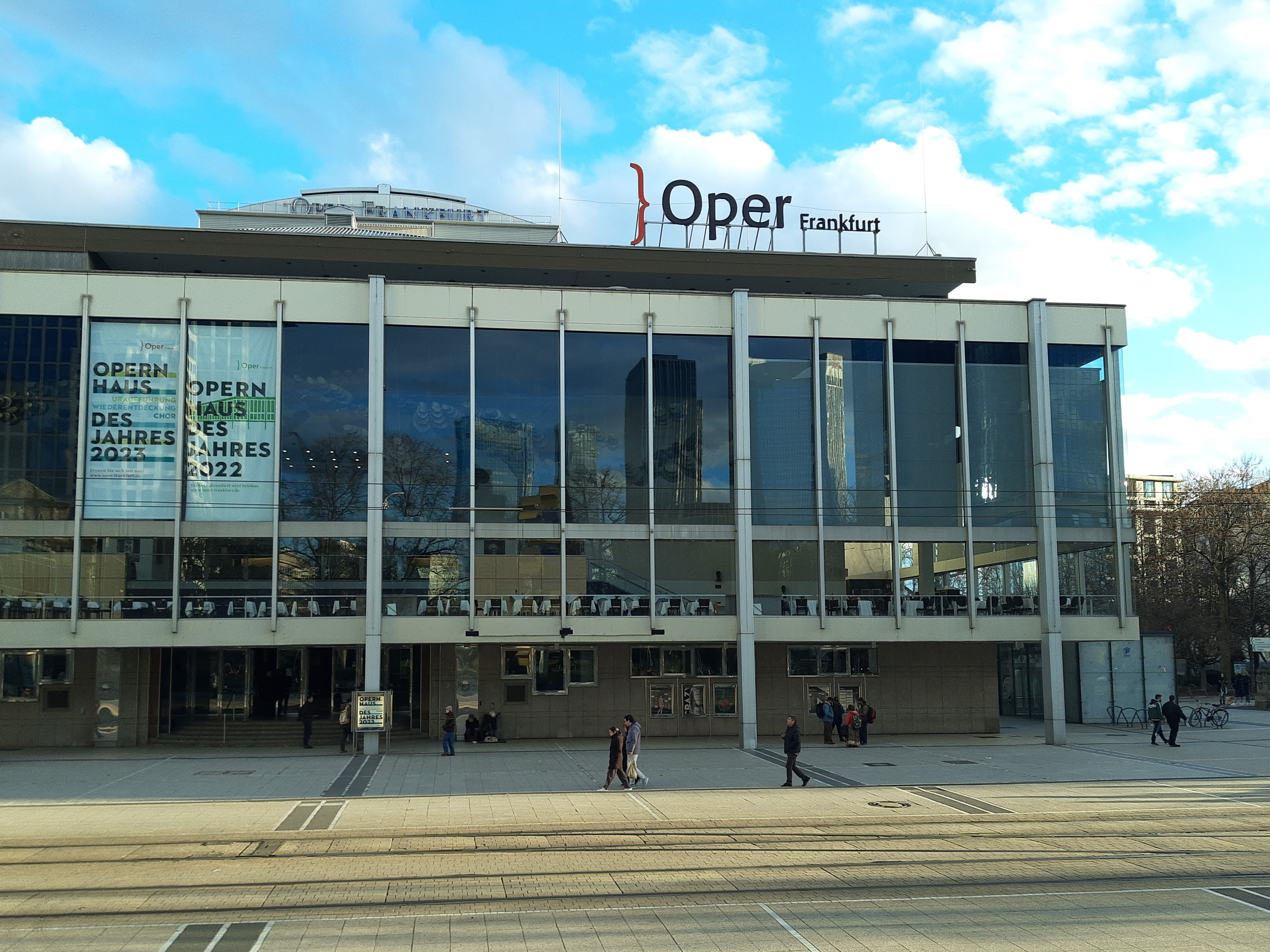
Oper Frankfurt building

Hinterdobler appeared at the Oper Frankfurt as Eva in a production of Wagner's Die Meistersinger von Nürnberg in 2022, directed by Johannes Erath and conducted by Sebastian Weigle. Orpheus magazine reviewed her performance as "full of soprano sunshine above all the other voices". A reviewer wrote that her "urgent soprano voice" magnificently made Eva a main character. Another reviewer noted that she portrayed the confident Eva with a large, luminous voice, as well as "sparkling charm and unabashed defiance", but hoped for more nuanced phrasing. She became a member of the company in 2023 and appeared there as Elisabetta in a revival of Verdi's Don Carlo; a reviewer described her voice was "eminently lyrical ... with an impeccable line", and noted her dramatic expression. She performed the role of Chrysothemis in Elektra by Richard Strauss first at the Tyrolean State Theatre in 2023, and a reviewer from the Online Merker wrote that she portrayed her character "gloriously, with a luminous soprano, good vocal expression and also a multi-faceted and emotionally committed performance". She then also appeared as Chrysothemis in Frankfurt.

Hinterdobler appeared as Grete in Zemlinsky's Der Traumgörge in Frankfurt in 2024, directed by Tilmann Köhler and conducted by Markus Poschner. Reviewer Curtis Rogers, writing for The Classical Source, noted that she took a "bold, sassy approach to the role". Writing in Frankfurter Allgemeine Zeitung Jan Brachmann described her singing as "fresh, beautiful and with exemplary diction". She performed a recital at the Oper Frankfurt of Hugo Wolf's Italienisches Liederbuch on 28 May 2024, with tenor Magnus Dietrich and the music director Thomas Guggeis as the pianist, and a reviewer from Frankfurter Rundschau described her voice as full of character and dark timbre, noting that both singers interpreted the many moods of the almost 50 songs with excellent diction and theatrical expression, sometimes changing from line to line.

== Recordings ==
Among Hinterdobler's recordings is Leo Fall's operetta Die Dollarprinzessin live from the Prinzregententheater in Munich in 2012, with Ulf Schirmer conducting the Munich Radio Orchestra, and according to a reviewer from Gramophone it is the only complete recording of the work. Another reviewer noted that the singers were "all well up to the task", and that she in the role of Daisy sang and acted "with great character", adding, "Things do seem to come to life whenever she is in the picture". Similarly, she appeared as Bertha in a recording of Max Bruch's rarely played opera Die Loreley live from Munich, conducted by Stefan Blunier.
