= List of theatres in Bavaria =

This is a list of notable theatres in the German state of Bavaria, organized by administrative district.

== Altbayern ==
=== Upper Palatinate ===
- Stadttheater Amberg
- Theater Regensburg
- Velodrom

=== Upper Bavaria ===
- Altes Stadttheater Eichstätt
- Schlierseer Bauerntheater
- Stadttheater Ingolstadt

=== Lower Bavaria ===
- Kleines theater – Kammerspiele Landshut
- Landestheater Niederbayern
- Stadttheater Passau
- Theater an der Rott

== Franconia ==
=== Upper Franconia ===
- Bamberger Marionettentheater
- E.T.A.-Hoffmann-Theater
- Landestheater Coburg
- Theater am Michelsberg
- Theater der Schatten
- Theater Hof

=== Middle Franconia ===
- Comödie Fürth
- Dehnberger Hoftheater
- Freilandtheater Bad Windsheim
- Markgrafentheater Erlangen
- Staatstheater Nurnberg
- Stadttheater Fürth
- Theater Ansbach

=== Lower Franconia ===
- Fränkisches Theater Schloss Maßbach
- Kurtheater Bad Kissingen
- Mainfranken Theater Würzburg

== Swabia ==
- Freilichtspiele Altusried
- Historisches Stadttheater Weißenhorn
- Musiktheater Füssen
- Staatstheater Augsburg
- Stadttheater Kempten
- Stadttheater Lindau
- Theater Neu-Ulm
