= Stadttheater =

Stadttheater (Eng: "municipal theatre") may refer to:

== Austria ==
- Stadttheater Grein
- Stadttheater Klagenfurt
- Stadttheater Leoben
- Wiener Stadttheater, now Ronacher

== Germany ==
- Altes Stadttheater Eichstätt, Bavaria
- Frankfurter Stadttheater, now Comoedienhaus
- Hamburger Stadttheater, or Hamburg State Opera
- Historisches Stadttheater Weißenhorn, Bavaria
- Stadttheater Aachen, now Theater Aachen
- Stadttheater Amberg, Bavaria
- Stadttheater Bielefeld, or Opera Bielefeld
- Stadttheater Bonn, or Teater Bonn
- Stadttheater Bremerhaven
- Stadttheater Cottbus, now Staatstheater Cottbus, the state theatre of Brandenburg
- Stadttheater Dortmund, or Teater Dortmund
- Stadttheater Düren, a former theatre, North Rhine-Westphalia,
- Stadttheater Düsseldorf, a former theatre
- Stadttheater Freiburg (or Theater Freiburg)
- Stadttheater Fürth, Bavaria
- Stadttheater Gießen
- Stadttheater Herford, North Rhine-Westphalia
- Stadttheater Ingolstadt, Bavaria
- Stadttheater Kempten, Bavaria
- Stadttheater Kiel, or Teater Kiel, Schleswig-Holstein
- Stadttheater Konstanz, Baden-Württemberg
- Stadttheater Krefeld, now Theater Krefeld und Mönchengladbach
- Stadttheater Lindau, Bavaria
- Stadttheater Magdeburg
- Stadttheater Minden, North Rhine-Westphalia
- Stadttheater Passau, Bavaria
- Stadttheater Pforzheim, Baden-Württemberg
- Stadttheater Regensburg, or Teater Regensburg
- Stadttheater Rostock, a former theatre destroyed in World War II
- Stadttheater Saarbrücken
- Stadttheater von Halle, Saxony-Anhalt

== Other countries ==
- Basler Stadttheater, Switzerland (now Theater Basel)
- Stadttheater Bozen in Bolzano, South Tyrol, Italy
- Bowery Amphitheatre in New York City, formerly known as the Stadt Theater
- Stadttheater Königsberg, former theatre, destroyed in WW2 in 1944 (now Kaliningrad, Russia)
- Revaler Stadttheater, former name of a theatre in Tallinn, Estonia, now Reval German Theatre
- Rigaer Stadttheater, German name for Riga City Theatre, Riga, Latvia
- Stadttheater Bern, Switzerland
- Stadttheater Meran, South Tyrol, Italy
