= Roland Hermann =

German operatic baritone (1936–2020)

- Born: 17 September 1936; Bochum, Germany
- Died: 17 November 2020 (aged 84); Zürich
- Education: University of Freiburg; Hochschule für Musik Mainz; Musikhochschule Frankfurt
- Occupations: Baritone; Academic teacher
- Organizations: Opernhaus Zürich; Hochschule für Musik Karlsruhe

Roland Hermann (17 September 1936 – 17 November 2020) was a German operatic baritone and former professor at the Hochschule für Musik Karlsruhe. A member of the Opernhaus Zürich, he performed leading roles internationally, not only in standard repertoire but also in world premieres and rarely performed works, such as Schoenberg's Moses und Aron.

== Life ==
Born in Bochum, Hermann studied at the University of Freiburg, the Hochschule für Musik Mainz and the Musikhochschule Frankfurt. He completed his vocal training with Margarete von Winterfeldt, Paul Lohmann and Flaminio Contini. In 1961 he was awarded third prize in the ARD International Music Competition.

Hermann made his opera debut as Count Almaviva in Mozart's Le nozze di Figaro at the Theater Trier in 1967. He became a member of the ensemble of the Opernhaus Zürich in 1968, with guest contracts to the Bavarian State Opera in Munich and the Cologne Opera. He appeared at the Teatro Colón in Buenos Aires as Jochanaan in Salome by Richard Strauss in 1974, as Pollux in Rameau's Castor et Pollux at the Oper Frankfurt in 1980, as Golaud in Debussy's Pelléas et Mélisande at La Scala in Milan in 1986, and appeared also in Paris and Berlin, among others. Engagements as a soloist with orchestras and as lieder singer led him to concert halls in Europe, the United States where he made his debut with the New York Philharmonic in 1983, and to the Far East.

== Repertoire ==
In addition to the usual leading baritone roles – the title role in Mozart's Don Giovanni, Wolfram in Wagner's Tannhäuser, Germont in Verdi's La traviata and Amfortas in Wagner's Parsifal – he sang in rarely performed works, including the title role in Marschner's Der Vampyr and Busoni's Doktor Faust, Schumann's Genoveva, Moses in Schönberg's Moses und Aron, and in Werner Egk's Peer Gynt. Hermann also sang leading roles in world premieres, including Rudolf Kelterborn's Der Kirschgarten (Zürich 1984) and York Höller's Der Meister und Margarita (Paris 1989).
