= Moscariello =

Moscariello is an Italian name that comes from the word "mosca" that means fly, originating primarily from the southern regions of Italy.

== Notable people with the surname ==
=== Arts and Literature ===
- Carmen Moscariello (born 1950), an Italian poet, theater writer, and journalist who spent over four decades in education and founded the international "Tulliola Renato Filippelli" poetry prize.

=== Sports ===
- Lucas Moscariello (born 1992), an Argentine professional handball player who plays as a pivot for BM Benidorm and represents the Argentina national team, with whom he competed in the 2020 Tokyo and 2024 Paris Olympic Games.
