= Ilse Hülper =

German theatre and film actress and soprano

Ilse Hülper (27 August 1919 (Note: Glenzdorf 1961, p. 726 and Frenzel & Moser 1956, p. 312 give the date of birth for Ilse Hülper as 27 August 1915.) – after 1967 (Note: A forum discussion gives 2002 as the year of death. However, this does not satisfy Wikipedia's requirement for reliable sources.)) was a German theatre and film actress, operatic and operetta soprano.

== Life ==
Born in Berlin Charlottenburg, Hülper received vocal training at the Berlin University of the Arts. Afterwards she attended the acting school of the Oldenburgisches Staatstheater. She gained her first stage experience from 1938, also at the Oldenburg State Theatre, as a singer in the chorus. From 1939 to 1942, she was engaged as a soloist at the Staatstheater Cottbus. Stations at the Stadttheater Fürth followed (Note: Glenzdorf 1961, p. 726 and Frenzel & Moser 1956, p. 312 list an engagement at the Altes Stadttheater am Lorenzer Platz 1832–1945, today Staatstheater Nürnberg, instead of the station in Fürth.) and from 1945 onwards at various stages in Berlin Hebbel Theater, Metropol-Theater, Metropole and Deutsche Oper Berlin). Her repertoire covered the entire classical and modern operetta repertoire. She appeared in Franz Lehár's Paganini, Jacques Offenbach's La Vie parisienne, Gräfin Dubarry by Carl Millöcker and Theo Mackeben and Wiener Blut by Johann Strauss II. In 1967, she ended her stage career.

She also appeared in two films. In Das Mädchen Christine by Arthur Maria Rabenalt, she portrayed the character of Lady Winterton in 1949 alongside Wolfgang Lukschy, Tilly Lauenstein and Gerd Frickhöffer, and in 1954, directed by Georg A. Profé in the musical film Alles für dich, mein Schatz.

Hülper was married to the actor, director and film producer Georg A. Profé (1908–1977).

== Filmography ==
- 1949: Das Mädchen Christine
- 1954: Alles für dich, mein Schatz

== Notes and references ==
=== Sources ===
- Glenzdorf, Johann Caspar (1961). Glenzdorfs internationales Film-Lexikon. Biographisches Handbuch für das gesamte Filmwesen (in German). Vol. 2: Hed–Peis. Bad Münder: Prominent-Filmverlag. DNB-IDN 451560744.
- Frenzel, Herbert A. [in German]; Moser, Hans Joachim, eds. (1956). Kürschners biographisches Theater-Handbuch. Schauspiel, Oper, Film, Rundfunk. Deutschland, Österreich, Schweiz. Berlin: De Gruyter. DNB-IDN 010075518.
