= Karan Armstrong =

American operatic soprano (1941–2021)

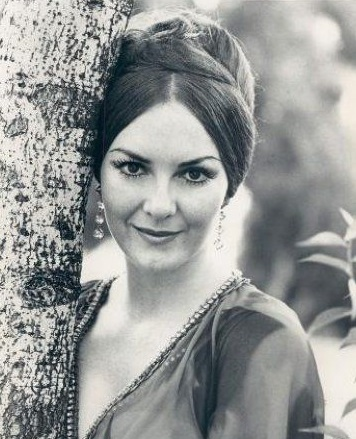
- Armstrong in 1974
- Born: December 14, 1941; Havre, Montana, U.S.
- Died: September 28, 2021 (aged 79); Marbella, Spain
- Education: Concordia College
- Occupation: Operatic soprano
- Organizations: Deutsche Oper Berlin
- Title: Kammersängerin
- Spouse: Götz Friedrich (m. 1979; died 2000)
- Children: 1

Karan Armstrong (December 14, 1941 – September 28, 2021) was an American operatic soprano, who was celebrated as a singing actress. After winning the Metropolitan Opera National Council Auditions in 1966, she was given small roles at the Metropolitan Opera, and appeared in leading roles at the New York City Opera from 1969, including Conceptión in Ravel's L'heure espagnol, Blonde in Mozart's Die Entführung aus dem Serail, and the title roles in Verdi's La traviata, Offenbach's La belle Hélène and Puccini's La fanciulla del West. After she performed in Europe from 1974, first as Micaëla in Bizet's Carmen, and then as a sensational Salome at the Opéra du Rhin, she enjoyed a career at major opera houses, appearing in several opera recordings and films. Armstrong was for decades a leading soprano at the Deutsche Oper Berlin, where her husband Götz Friedrich was director. She appeared in world premieres, including Gottfried von Einem's Jesu Hochzeit, Luciano Berio's Un re in ascolto and York Höller's Der Meister und Margarita. She was awarded the title Kammersängerin twice.

== Biography ==
Armstrong was born in Havre, Montana. Originally trained as a pianist, she graduated with a Bachelor of Music degree from Concordia College in 1963. She later studied with Lotte Lehmann in Santa Barbara, California. She made her operatic debut in 1965 with a secondary company in San Francisco, as Musetta in Puccini's La bohème. She made her first appearance with the San Francisco Spring Opera the following year, as Elvira in Rossini's L'italiana in Algeri.

In 1966, Armstrong won the Metropolitan Opera National Council Auditions, which led to her engagement by the house for small roles. She first appeared there on October 2, 1966, as one of the servants in Die Frau ohne Schatten by Richard Strauss, conducted by Karl Böhm, alongside Leonie Rysanek and Christa Ludwig. She continued to perform regularly at the Met through the spring of 1969, in roles such as the Paggio in Verdi's Rigoletto (opposite Cornell MacNeil), Annina in Verdi's La traviata (with Virginia Zeani in the title role), and the Dew Fairy in Humperdinck's Hänsel und Gretel (with Teresa Stratas as Gretel). She appeared as a guest at the Santa Fe Opera as Adina in Donizetti's L'elisir d'amore in 1968.

Preferable contracts emanated from the New York City Opera, and she made her first appearance with that company as the Reine de Chémakhâ in Rimsky-Korsakov's Le coq d'or (with Michael Devlin) in 1969. She appeared at the theatre many times through 1977, singing such roles as Conceptión in Ravel's L'heure espagnol (with Kenneth Riegel), Blonde in Mozart's Die Entführung aus dem Serail (with Patricia Brooks and later Beverly Sills as Konstanze), and the title roles in La traviata, Offenbach's La belle Hélène and Puccini's La fanciulla del West, among others.

In 1974, she first appeared in Europe, as Micaëla in Bizet's Carmen at the Opéra du Rhin in Strasbourg. The following year, she created a sensation with her performance as Salome by Richard Strauss at the same theatre. Further performances in Europe followed, including the title role in Puccini's Tosca at La Fenice in Venice, and Elsa in the 1979 Bayreuth Festival's Lohengrin, alongside Peter Hofmann in the title role, directed by her future husband, Götz Friedrich, in a performance which was later recorded and filmed. She appeared in Berlin and helped shape the Deutsche Oper Berlin for almost four decades in over 400 evenings and twenty-four different roles. She gave her roles psychological credibility, often in productions with her husband as director. She performed also in Vienna, Paris, at The Royal Opera House (as Berg's Lulu, which Robert Craft described as "accurately sung and perfectly enacted"), Los Angeles, and at the Bolshoi Theatre in Moscow.

She appeared in several operatic world premieres, including Gottfried von Einem's Jesu Hochzeit (as Death), Giuseppe Sinopoli's Lou Salomé, Luciano Berio's Un re in ascolto, York Höller's Der Meister und Margarita, Desdemona und ihre Schwestern by Siegfried Matthus, and Cosima, also by Matthus. She also performed in Douglas Moore's The Ballad of Baby Doe, Robert Ward's The Crucible, Carlisle Floyd's Susannah, Offenbach's Les contes d'Hoffmann (as Giulietta, opposite Norman Treigle), Bartók's Bluebeard's Castle, Poulenc's La voix humaine, Debussy's Pelléas et Mélisande, Berg's Wozzeck, Der Rosenkavalier by Richard Strauss, Les Troyens by Berlioz (as Cassandre), Korngold's Die tote Stadt, Wagner's Parsifal, Krenek's Karl V., Schoenberg's Erwartung, Wagner's Die Walküre (as Sieglinde), Janáček's Katya Kabanova and The Makropulos Case, Marcel Landowski's Montségur, Die Frau ohne Schatten (as the Färberin), Shostakovitch's Lady Macbeth of Mtsensk, Henze's The Bassarids, Beethoven's Fidelio, Hindemith's Mathis der Maler (as Ursula), Wagner's Tannhäuser (as Venus, with René Kollo in the title role) and Poulenc's Dialogues des Carmélites (as Mother Marie of the Incarnation).

In 1985, Armstrong was named a Kammersängerin in Stuttgart; in 1994, she received the title in Berlin. Later roles included the Widow Begbick in Weill's Aufstieg und Fall der Stadt Mahagonny at the Deutsche Oper Berlin, Teatro Carlo Felice, Bern Theatre, Theater Erfurt, Herodias in Salome at Antikenfestspiele Trier and Canadian Opera Company, Kabanicha in Katja Kabanowa at Israeli Opera and Teatro La Fenice, Kostelnička in Jenůfa at Komische Oper Berlin, Klytämnestra in Elektra at Teatro dell'Opera di Roma, Théâtre du Capitole and New National Theatre, Tokyo, Mrs Quickly in Verdi's Falstaff at New National Theatre, Tokyo, Mme Larine in Tchaikovsky's Eugene Onegin at the Deutsche Oper Berlin in a Friedrich production, the Old Lady in Bernstein's Candide at the Flanders Opera, the Queen of Hearts in Unsuk Chin's Alice in Wonderland in Geneva, and Cecily 'Cissy' Robson in Ronald Harwood's play Quartet in Berlin. In 2015, she sang Geneviève in a concert performance of Pelléas et Mélisande in Turin, conducted by Juraj Valčuha.

== Personal ==
Armstrong was married for many years to the stage director and impresario Götz Friedrich. Their marriage ended with Friedrich's death, in 2000. The couple had one son, Johannes.

Armstrong died in Marbella, Spain, on September 28, 2021, at the age of 79.

== Discography ==
- Wagner: Lohengrin (Hofmann; Nelsson, 1982) [live] CBS OCLC 1184322289
- Menotti: Songs (Francesch, p.1983) Etcetera OCLC 22489759
- Berio: Un re in ascolto (Adam; Maazel, 1984) [live] col legno OCLC 1183573911
- Henze: The Bassarids (Riegel; Albrecht, 1986) koch schwann OCLC 25064291
- Landowski: Montségur (G.Quilico; Plasson, 1987) [live] Cybelia OCLC 874205377
- Zemlinsky: Lyric Symphony (Kusnjer; Gregor, 1987–88) Supraphon OCLC 27646751
- Zemlinsky: Lyric Symphony (Hermann; Gielen, 1989) [live] Orfeo
- Höller: Traumspiel (Zagrosek, 1989) WERGO OCLC 1080904217

== Videography ==
- Verdi: Falstaff (Bacquier, Stilwell; Solti, Friedrich, 1978–79) Deutsche Grammophon OCLC 62869024
- Wagner: Lohengrin (Hofmann; Nelsson, Friedrich, 1982) [live] EuroArts OCLC 1252600990
- Korngold: Die tote Stadt (King; Hollreiser, Friedrich, 1983) [live] Arthaus Musik OCLC 893682407
- "Richard-Wagner-Abend" [includes Wesendonck-Lieder and Isoldes Liebestod] (Adam; Masur, 1988) [live] Kultur ISBN 978-1-56127-243-3, OCLC 30745561

== Bibliography ==
- The Metropolitan Opera Encyclopedia, edited by David Hamilton, Simon and Schuster, 1987. ISBN 978-0-671-61732-5
- Karan Armstrong: Das Mädchen aus dem goldenen Westen, by Ruth Renée Reif, Langen Müller, 1996. ISBN 978-3-7844-2563-4
- A Cool Brilliance: The Legacy of Karan Armstrong, monograph by Brian Morgan, Amazon, 2023. ISBN 979-8-3990-0917-9
