= Heinz Lukas-Kindermann =

German theatre director and intendant (born 1939)

Heinz Lukas-Kindermann (born 1 June 1939) is a German theatre director and intendant.

== Life and career ==
Born in Münster, Lukas-Kindermann is the son of the Austrian theatre scholar Heinz Kindermann. He grew up in Vienna and studied at the University of Music and Performing Arts Vienna. He was then assistant director of Gustav Rudolf Sellner at the Deutsche Oper Berlin. Afterwards he became chief director of the opera at the Stadttheater Bielefeld and later opera director at the Theater Kiel, the Staatstheater Braunschweig, the Staatstheater Nürnberg as well as the Theater Dortmund.

Lukas-Kindermann also worked at the Deutsche Oper am Rhein in Düsseldorf and Duisburg, the Wiener Staatsoper, the Volksoper Wien, the Opernhaus Zürich, the Staatstheater Hannover, the Berliner Festspiele, but also at the Teatro Nacional de São Carlos in Lisbon, the Savonlinna Opera Festival, the Vlaamse Opera in Antwerp, the Staatsoper Prague.

From 1995 to 2004, Lukas-Kindermann was director of the Theater Trier, where he co-founded among other things the Antikenfestspiele. He directed a production of Korngold's Das Wunder der Heliane in Brno.
