= Karl M. Sibelius =

Austrian cultural manager, actor, singer and director

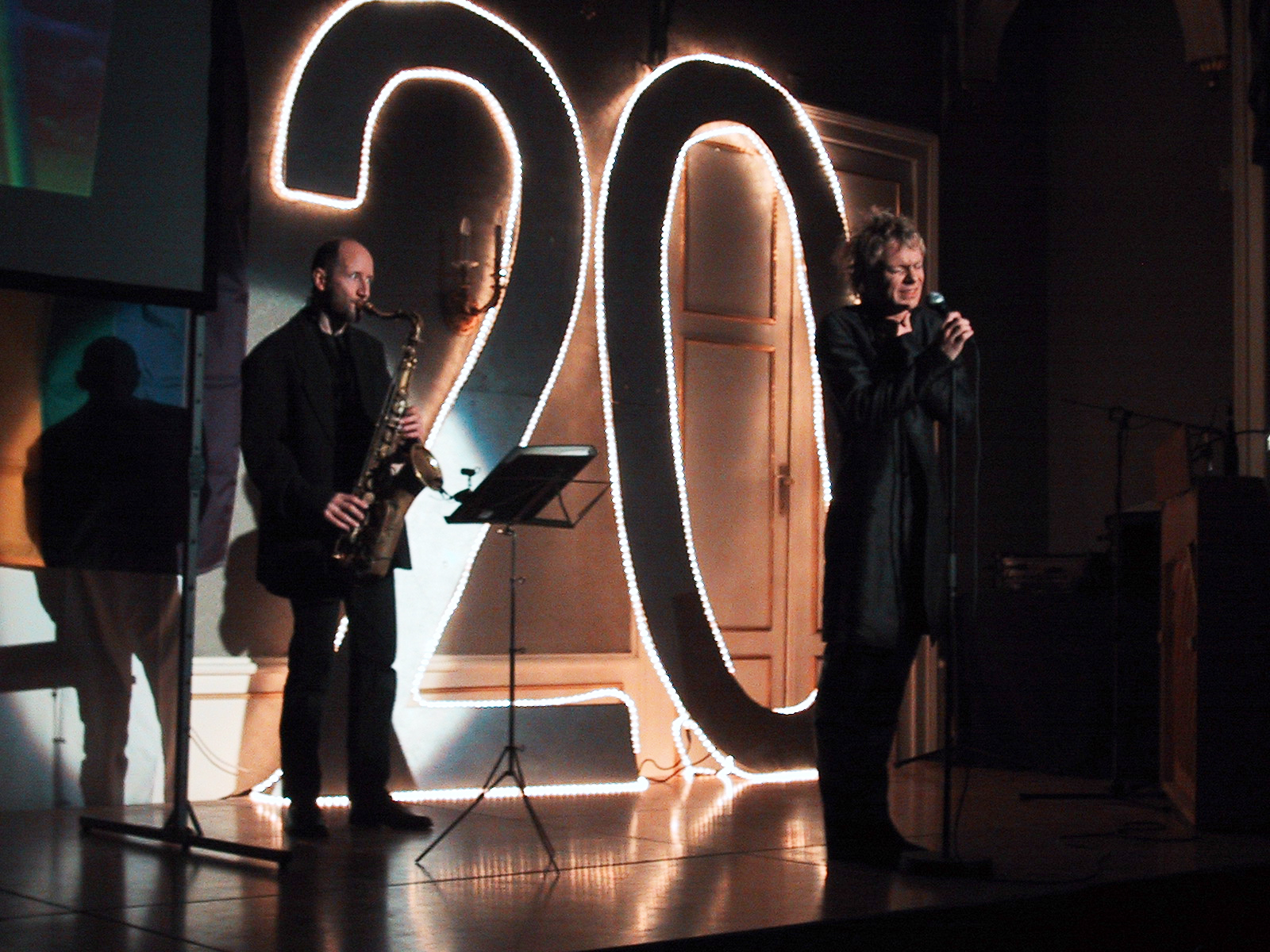
Sibelius sings to saxophone accompaniment at the "20 Jahre HOSI Linz" festival on 15 March 2003

Karl M. Sibelius (born 18 July 1969) is an Austrian cultural manager, actor, singer and theatre director. From 2012 to 2015, he was artistic director at the Theater an der Rott in Eggenfelden, Lower Bavaria. From August 2015 to November 2016, he was general director with overall artistic, commercial and personnel responsibility at the Theater Trier.

== Education ==
Born in Bregenz, Sibelius grew up in Carinthia, attended the Bundesoberstufenrealgymnasium (musical branch) there and then studied musical entertainment theatre and singing in Vienna at the Konservatorium Wien Privatuniversität. He holds a Master of Arts in Peace and Conflict Studies from the European Peace University, a degree in cultural manager from the University of Vienna, an Executive Master of Art Administration from the University of Zurich and a Doctor of Philosophy (title of doctoral thesis: Orchestra Projects – Instruments of Social Change). of the University of Art and Design Linz.

== Artist ==
=== Work at the Landestheater Linz ===
From 1992 until 2012, he was engaged at the Landestheater Linz. He appeared in classical acting roles (Hamlet, Tellheim in Minna von Barnhelm), in Johann Nestroy's Höllenangst as "Wendelin", but also in musicals and operettas (among others as "Frankn'Furter" in The Rocky Horror Show) and in operas. In addition, he gave song recitals ("Ich find Schlager toll", "Schiff der Träume", "Struwwelpeter"). He created the art figure Rose. His productions include the Linz productions Männer, La Grande-Duchesse de Gérolstein, La Cage aux Folles. Further, his direction and translation of Stephen Sondheim's musical thriller Sweeney Todd was seen at the Landestheater. In The Good Person of Szechwan he was on stage as Shen Te/Shui Ta in Ong Keng Sen's production. He staged the Austrian premiere of Song and Dance at Posthof Linz, brought Matchgirl Opera to premiere and was director of the children's opera Das Traumfresserchen. For Linz 2009 – European Capital of Culture, Sibelius hosted the opening ceremonies.

In between, he repeatedly made guest appearances on stages in Vienna (Serapionstheater, Schauspielhaus Wien, Theater in der Josefstadt) and Germany (Münchner Volkstheater, Staatstheater Kassel, Bonn, Augsburg, Stadttheater Konstanz). In July 2007, Sibelius made his debut as an opera director in Klosterneuburg with Beethoven's Fidelio. In Linz, he appeared in the 2007/08 season as Adam Schaf in Georg Kreisler's biographical song recital and as head waiter "Leopold" in the operetta Im weißen Rößl, in June and July 2008 at the Bad Leonfeldner Sommerfestspiele in musical Cabaret as a conferencier under the artistic direction of Thomas Kerbl.

=== Theater an der Rott ===
In 2012, Sibelius moved to the Theater an der Rott in Eggenfelden as artistic director and created his first season in 2012/2013. His artistic and economic restructuring measures (change management) are closely followed beyond the region. At the end of the 2014/2015 season, he ended prematurely his work at the Theater an der Rott.

=== Theatre Trier ===
Sibelius became general director of Theater Trier in August 2015. In 2016, criticism of Sibelius' management of the theatre arose. His summary dismissal of the theatre director Ulf Frötzschner was reversed by the city after protests by the acting ensemble and the directors and a hearing before the Stage Arbitration Court.

In the course of 2016, it became known that the theatre's budget had been considerably overdrawn. In a meeting on 17 November 2016, the Trier city council decided to terminate the contract with Sibelius at the end of the month. The reasons given by Mayor Wolfram Leibe included "dramatic mismanagement" and a deficit of over 3 million euros since Karl M. Sibelius took office.

== Engagement outside the theatre ==
Sibelius was active in the city cultural advisory board Linz and committed himself to the Aids-Hilfe Upper Austria. In the daily Österreich his column "Alltag Kultur" appeared every Monday for two years. At the Anton Bruckner Private University, Sibelius was a lecturer at the opera school. From 2010 to 2013, he was a lecturer at the Institute for Singing at the University Mozarteum Salzburg. Sibelius has been working as a professor (PH2) at the Pädagogische Hochschule Oberösterreich in Linz since October 2019.

== Awards ==
- From 2005 to 2007 Sibelius was nominated for the Gay And Lesbian Award (G.A.L.A.) der HOSI Linz.
- 2007 After the benefit gala "Let's POP!!!" in 2007 for the benefit of HOSI Linz, Sibelius was awarded the Cross of Honour "Fidei et Merito" ("Of Loyalty and Merit") together with the President of the National Council Barbara Prammer.
- 2007 Ehrenzeichen der HOSI Linz
- 2012 Kulturmedaille des Landes Oberösterreich.
- 2013 Überraschungssieger für innovative Theaterarbeit abseits der Zentren (Deutsche Bühne)
- 2014 Nominierung seines Bürgerprojekts WEIL I DI MAG für den BKM-Preis Kulturelle Bildung durch den Deutschen Bühnenverein
- 2019 Anerkennungspreis "Stadt der Vielfalt" für den von Sibelius mitkonzipierten Hochschullehrgang "Friedenspädagogik und Menschenrechtsbildung" an Pädagogischen Hochschule Oberösterreich
