= City Theatre =

City Theatre may refer to:

== Europe ==
- Brno City Theatre, Brno, Czech Republic
- Gothenburg City Theatre, Gothenburg, Sweden
- Helsingborg City Theatre, Helsingborg, Sweden
- Helsinki City Theatre, Helsinki, Finland
- Ljubljana City Theatre, Ljubljana, Slovenia
- Malmö City Theatre, Malmö, Sweden
- Oulu City Theatre, Oulu, Finland
- Reykjavík City Theatre, Reykjavík, Iceland
- SFX City Theatre, Dublin, Dublin, Ireland
- Stockholm City Theatre, Stockholm, Sweden

== United States ==
- City Theatre (Detroit), Detroit, Michigan, United States
- City Theatre (Pittsburgh), Pittsburgh, Michigan, United States

== Other countries ==
- City Theatre, Sydney (1843–1845), Australia
- DBKL City Theatre, Kuala Lumpur, Malaysia

== See also ==
- NTGent, established as the city theatre of Ghent, Belgium
- Stadttheater (disambiguation)
