= Theater Trier =

German theatre

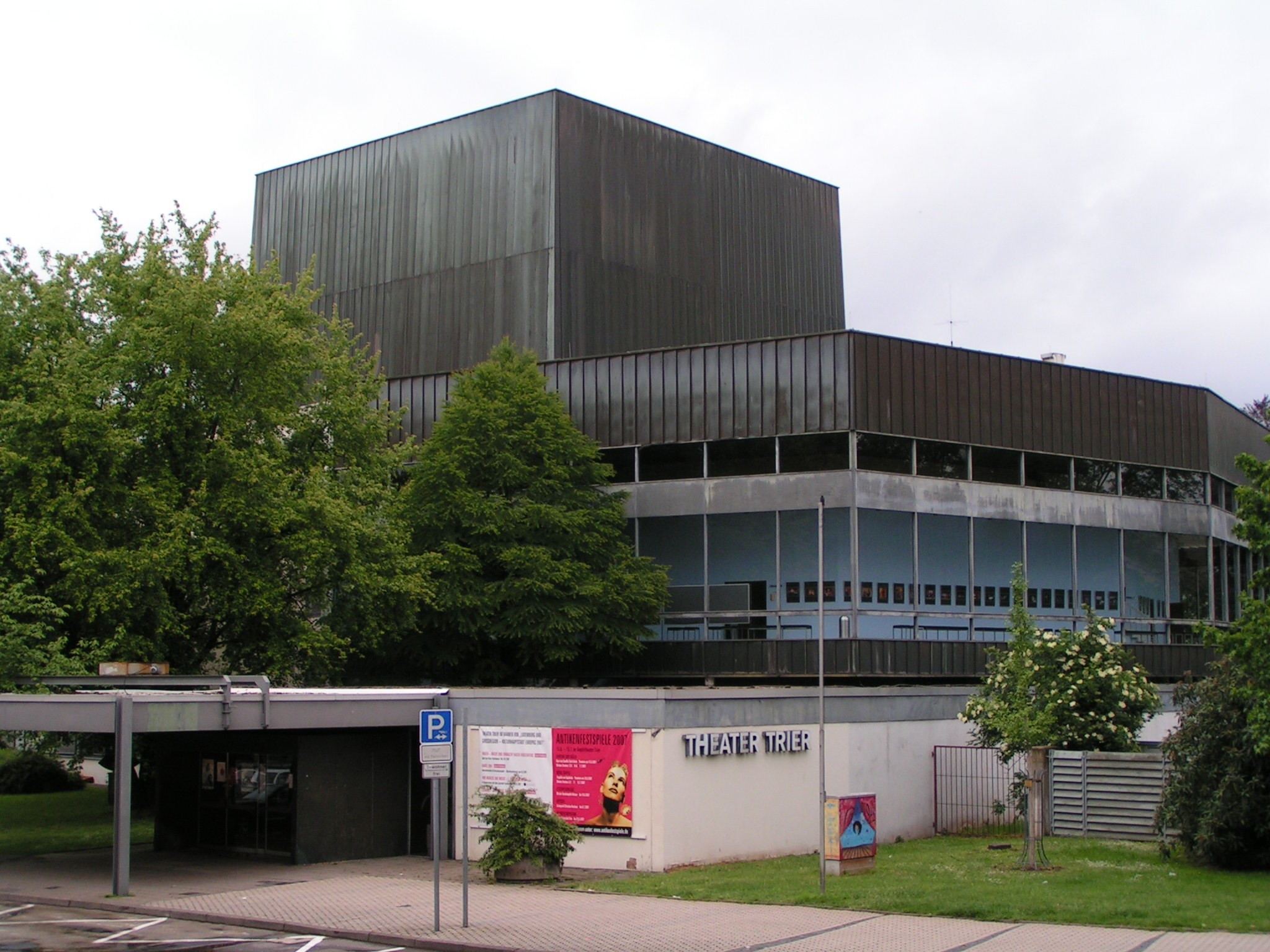
- Interactive map of Theater Trier
- Address: Germany
- Type: Municipal theatre

Website
- theater-trier.de

The Theater Trier is the municipal theatre of the city of Trier and, as a three-branch house encompassing opera and musical, drama, and dance (ballet), one of the most important cultural institutions in the region. It has existed in its institutional form since 1802. Since the 2025/26 season, Lajos Wenzel has led the house as sole director.

== History ==
=== 1802 to 1944 ===
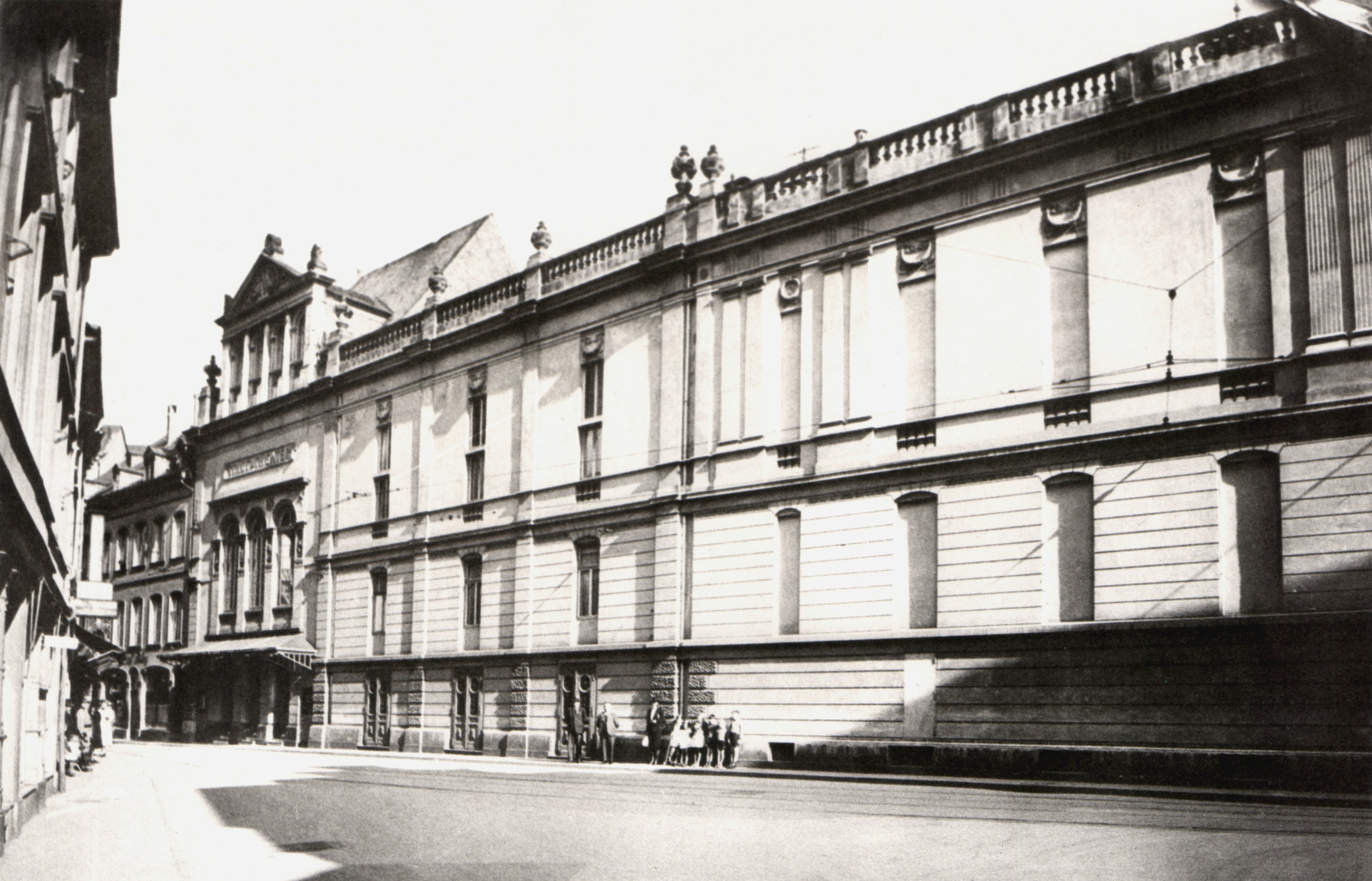
Former theater of Trier, destroyed in 1944.

When Trier was a Roman town, there was already theatre. In 1802, Napoleon visited the French-occupied city and decreed that the former Capuchin monastery was designated for the establishment of a theatre. From 1802 to 1944, the theatre played in the building on Fahrstraße. In 1908, Heinz Tietjen conducted a performance of Wagner's Der Ring des Nibelungen. Before the closure of the theatre ordered by the Nazis, the last performance in this building took place on 16 July 1944 with Der Rosenkavalier by Richard Strauss. On 23 December 1944, the theatre building in Fahrstraße was destroyed by an Allied air raid.

=== After World War II ===
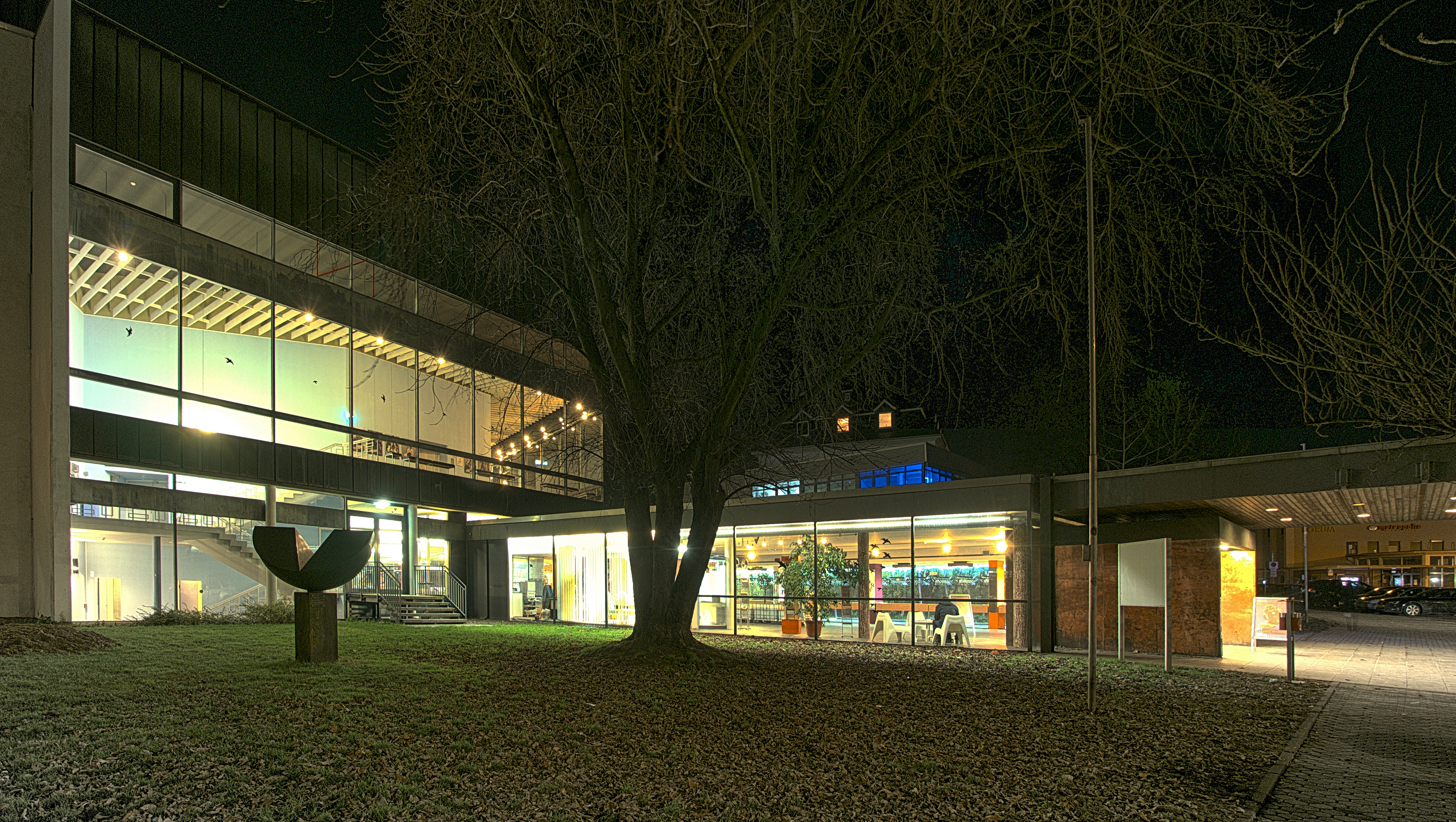
Theatre entrance and foyer, May 2017

After the end of the war, the theatre played provisionally in the Treveris Hall until 1950, then from 1950 to 1964 in the Bischof-Korum-Haus in Rindertanzstraße. On 12 January 1962, the foundation stone was laid for a new building, Am Augustinerhof, which was constructed by 1964 according to plans by the architect Gerhard Graubner. On 27 September 1964, the theatre opened in the new building with a premiere of Beethoven's Fidelio.

The house seats 622 spectators. The main stage is 20 m (66 ft) wide and 19 m (62 ft) deep including the front stage. It is surrounded by a side stage and a back stage with a sliding stage and a built-in revolving stage. The stage is separated from the auditorium by a curved iron curtain. The orchestra pit has space for 65 musicians on two mobile podiums. When raised, these podiums form the front stage. The stage opening can be enlarged or reduced by means of a variable stage portal.

The theatre employs a staff of more than 250 people, including the acting ensemble, the musical theatre ensemble with opera choir, extrachor and children's and youth choir, the ballet ensemble and the philharmonic orchestra, which since 2018 has been led by general music director Jochem Hochstenbach. Ensemble members and guest performers have included Franz Grundheber and Anja Kampe,

In June 2013, the theatre was placed on the Rote Liste Kultur by the German Cultural Council and classified as "threatened with closure" (category 1). In the spring of 2014, the city council decided to continue the theatre's operation. From 2021, director Karl M. Sibelius will be assisted by co-director Lajos Wenzel; contracts, also for Jochem Hochstenbach, run to 2028.

=== Redevelopment ===
Since 2015, the future of the theatre has been discussed, as the building is in need of renovation due to long-neglected building maintenance and there are considerable space problems. After controversial discussions, in which the construction of a second location elsewhere was also considered, according to an expert opinion from 2016, the costs for a pure renovation of the existing theatre building were around 32 million euros, for renovation and expansion up to 110 million euros. Therefore, at the beginning of 2019, the Trier City Council decided to renovate the existing theatre, which will essentially be preserved in its current form – however, the demolition and new construction of the foyer will be required. During the approximately three-year renovation phase (planned start of construction August 2021), operations will be relocated to a new building at the TUFA with 380 seats. For opera performances and symphony concerts, the Europahalle Trier is also to be used during the refurbishment.

== Rediscoveries and world premieres ==
The theatre has focused on lesser-known operas since 1995, when Heinz Lukas-Kindermann initiated a series Unbekannte Opern. He was often the stage director when world premieres, German premieres and revivals of neglected operas took place in Trier. These included:

- 1995/96: Sarema by Alexander von Zemlinsky
- 1996/97: Merlin by Karl Goldmark
- 1996/97: Ritter Blaubart by Jacques Offenbach
- 1996/97: Die Glasmenagerie (The Glass Menagerie) by Antonio Bibalo – world premiere
- 1997/98: Die Soldaten by Manfred Gurlitt
- 1997: Die Geschichte vom kleine Bergsee und dem alten Adler (The Story of the Little Blue Mountain Lake and the Old Eagle) by Wilfried Hiller – world premiere
- 1998/99: Die Kathrin by Erich Wolfgang Korngold
- 1999/2000: Koanga by Frederick Delius – German premiere
- 2000: Trilogy of Summer Retreat by Ingomar Grünauer – world premiere EXPO 2000
- 2000: Margot la Rouge by Frederick Delius
- 2000: Ein Bericht für eine Akademie (A Report for an Academy) by Jan Klusák – German premiere
- 2002: Pinocchio by Wilfried Hiller – world premiere
- 2003: Nordische Ballade (Nordic Ballad) by Manfred Gurlitt (production: Lukas-Kindermann) – world premiere
- 2004: Die unendliche Geschichte, after The Neverending Story, by Siegfried Matthus – world premiere (production: Lukas-Kindermann)
- 2004: Das Orangenmädchen by Martin Lingnau / Edith Jeske – world premiere
- 2005: Die Rheinnixen by Jacques Offenbach, original version (production: Bruno Berger-Gorski)
- 2005: Quo Vadis by Konstantin Wecker / Gerold Theobalt Antikenfestspiele (production: Gerhard Weber) – world premiere
- 2007: Fausta by Heinz Heckmann / Heiner Martini (production: Hermann Keckeis) – world premiere
- 2007: Cusanus – Fragmente der Unendlichkeit (Cusanus ― Fragments of Infinity) by Boudewijn Buckinx (production: Sven Grützmacher) – world premiere
- 2011: The Voyage by Philip Glass (production: Birgit Scherzer) – German premiere
- 2015: Ur_ by Anna Thorvaldsdóttir (production: Thorleifur Örn Arnarsson) – world premiere

== Discography ==
- Sarema – Die Rose vom Kaukasus / Alexander von Zemlinsky (1871–1942). With Karin Clark, Laszlo Lukas, Norbert Kleinhenn, Andreas Scheel, Juri Zinovenko, Nick Herbosch, Florian Simson, Chor and Extrachor of the Stadttheaters Trier (study: Sebastian Laverny), Städtisches Orchester Trier conducted by István Dénes. Koch International 1996.
