= Municipal theatre =

A municipal theatre is a theatre that is publicly owned. By contrast with a state theatre, such as the Landesbühnen of Germany and Austria, a municipal theatre is not financed by the state, but by the town or city in which it is situated. In Europe the municipal theatres emerged from the court theatres of the later 18th or 19th century and, in some cases, also from private theatres jointly financed by the wealthy citizens of a town or city.

== See also ==
- City Theatre
