= Carmen Moscariello =

Italian poet (born 1950)

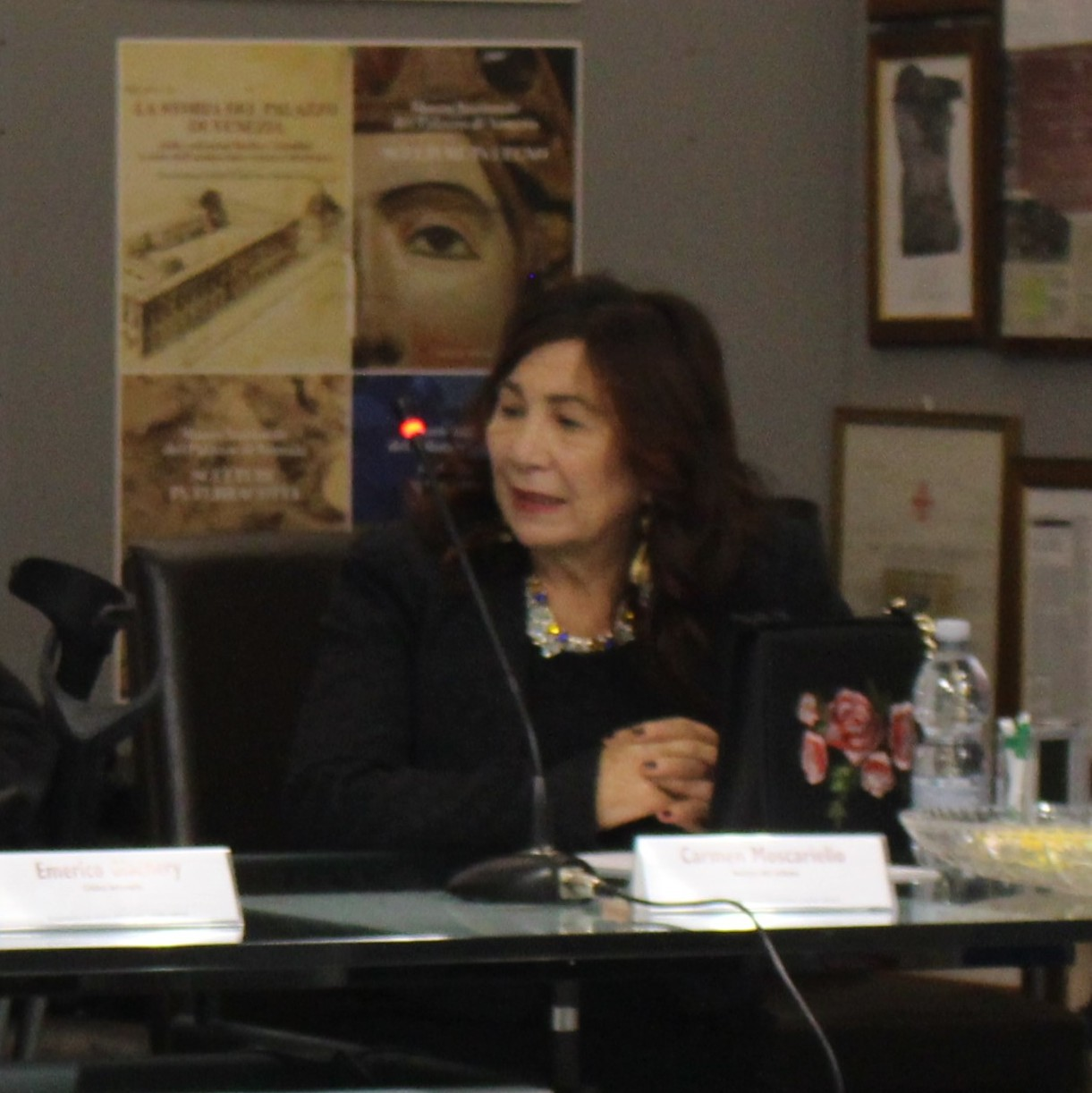
- Carmen Moscariello (2020)
- Born: 16 May 1950 (age 76); Avellino, Italy
- Occupations: Poet, theater writer, journalist
- Website: Renato Filippelli Award website

Carmen Moscariello (born 16 May 1950) is an Italian poet. She is the founder of the Tulliola Renato Filippelli international poetry prize.

== Biography ==
Moscariello spent 42 years as a teacher. She was a pupil of Raffaello Franchini. She is a poet, playwright, and director.

She obtained the title for La Regia with Roberto Tessari at the Università degli studi di Roma "La Sapienza", publicist journalist. She was a correspondent with the newspaper Il Tempo from 1987 to 1996, publishing about 1,500 articles. She reported on investigations on Tangentopoli, the phenomenon of usury, the Garigliano nuclear power plant, and the Camorra. She was also a correspondent for TG3 Lazio.

Moscariello is the president and founder of Tulliola Renato Filippelli, an international prize for poetry. She received non-fiction and journalism prizes in the XXVI edition, a prize rewarded with a medal by the President of the Republic Giorgio Napolitano for high cultural merits. She is president of the "Legality against the Mafia" award (VII edition). She wrote articles for "Oggi e Domani", Avvenire, poetic frequencies; Il Convivio; Culture there perspective and other literary newspapers.

In 1999, she was the director and founder of the monthly political and culture magazine "Il Levriero". As a syndicalist of the National Union of Musicians and Artists (UNAMs), she organised painting exhibitions, concerts and cultural conferences.

In 2020, Aula Magna of the high school Coreutico Suor Orsola Benincasa of Naples presentation of the book "Modigliani l'anima dipinta".

== Bibliography ==
- Friedrich Hölderlin, tra Lirica e Filosofia, Lucarini Editore; Rome, 1988
- Testimonianze su Franco Ferrara, Imiziad e lettere a Natascia Risposte, Salerno, 1989
- Poesie, Oggi e Domani, EDIARS, Pescara, 1994
- Il presente della memoria, Publiscoop Editore, Sessa Aurunca, 1994 ISBN 88-8644-801-5
- Gli occhi frugano il vento Bastogi Editrice Italiana, Foggia, 1999
- Proserpina. Tre atti preceduti da un preludio Bastogi Editrice Italiana, 2003 ISBN 88-8185-585-2
- Elelonora dalle belle mani. Dialogo segreto tra Eleonora Duse e Gabriele D'Annunzio. Opera drammatica in tre atti Bastogi Editrice Italiana, Foggia, 2005 ISBN 88-8185-758-8
- Giordano Bruno. Sorgente di fuoco Guida Editori, Napoli, 2011 ISBN 88-6042-781-9
- Non è tempo per il Messia Guida Editori, Napoli, 2012 ISBN 88-6666-105-8
- Oboe per flauto traverso. Parole per Ugo Piscopo Guida Editori, Napoli, 2012 ISBN 88-6666-164-3
- Ugo Piscopo terra della sera. Visioni Editore Guida, 2014 ISBN 88-6866-047-4
- L'orologio smarrito Guida Editori, Napoli, 2014 ISBN 88-6866-078-4
- Tunnel dei sogni Il Convivio edizioni, 2016 ISBN 88-9971-774-5
- Destini sincronici Amelia Rosselli e Rocco Scotellaro. Con lettere di Rocco Scotellaro e Michele Prisco Guida Editori, Napoli, 2015 ISBN 88-6866-096-2
- Modigliani. L’anima Dipinta Gangemi Editore, Rome, 2019 ISBN 88-4923-784-7
- Pizia non dà più oracoli : poesie 2017-2020 Gangemi editore SpA international, Rome, 2021 ISBN 9788849240016
