= Freilandtheater Bad Windsheim =

Theatre in Bavaria, Germany

Coordinates: 49°29′50″N 10°25′20″E

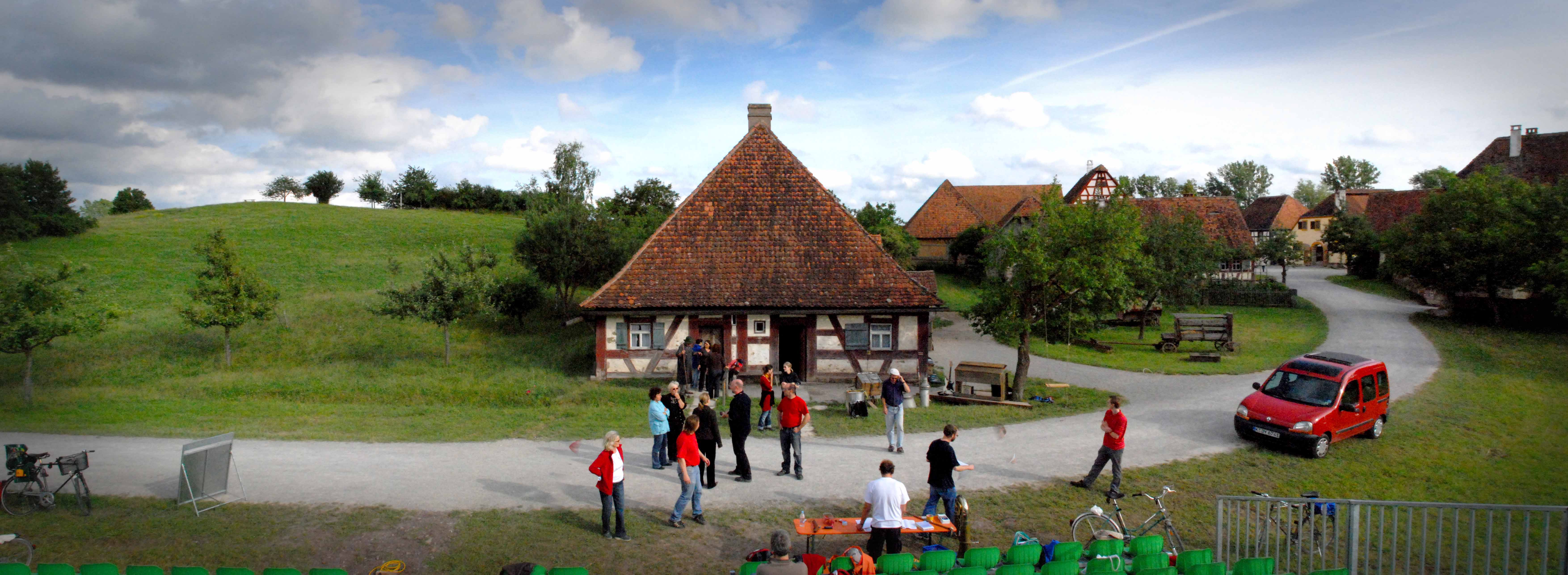
Freilandtheater Bad Windsheim Panorama

Freilandtheater Bad Windsheim is a theatre in Bavaria, Germany.
