= Theater der Schatten =

Theatre in Bavaria, Germany

Theater der Schatten is a theatre in Bavaria, Germany.
