= Der Meister und Margarita =

- Opera by York Höller
- Librettist: York Höller
- Language: German
- Based on: The Master and Margarita by Mikhail Bulgakov
- Premiere: 20 May 1989; Palais Garnier, Paris

Der Meister und Margarita (The Master and Margarita) is an opera in two acts by York Höller. The libretto, also by Höller, is based on Mikhail Bulgakov's novel, The Master and Margarita. Höller composed the work between 1984 and 1989, and revised it in 2008.

Der Meister und Margarita was premiered at the Paris Opéra (Palais Garnier) on 20 May 1989, staged by Hans Neuenfels and conducted by Lothar Zagrosek, with Roland Herrmann and Karan Armstrong in the title roles. It was recorded in 2000 by the Gürzenich Orchestra Cologne, again conducted by Zagrosek, with Richard Salter, Marilyn Schmiege and Franz Mazura in leading roles.

== Roles ==
Role	Voice type	Premiere cast Conductor: Lothar Zagrosek
The Master, Jeschua	helden-baritone	Roland Herrmann
Margarita	dramatic soprano	Karan Armstrong
Voland, the black magician	bass-baritone	James Johnson
