= York Höller =

German composer, born 1949

York Höller (German pronunciation: [ˌjɔʁk ˈhœlɐ]; born 11 January 1944) is a German composer and professor of composition at the Hochschule für Musik Köln.

== Biography ==
Höller was born in Leverkusen. Between 1963 and 1970 he studied at the Cologne Musikhochschule: composition with Joachim Blume and Bernd Alois Zimmermann, piano with Else Schmitz-Gohr and Alfons Kontarsky, and orchestral conducting with Wolfgang von der Nahmer. Parallel to this, he studied musicology and philosophy at the University of Cologne. He did further musical studies at the Internationale Ferienkurse für Neue Musik in Darmstadt with Pierre Boulez, and in 1967 sat his examination in music education.

Höller was active for a short time as a répétiteur at the Staatstheater Bonn. At the Electronic Music Studio of WDR in 1971–72, he "continued his studies with Karlheinz Stockhausen" or, alternatively, "was given the chance, at Stockhausen's invitation, to realize works of his own". In any case, the technique he developed at this time—a form of extended serialism which he calls "Gestalt composition"—bears a resemblance to the older composer's formula composition, and in 1982 Höller dedicated his orchestral work Schwarze Halbinseln to Stockhausen. He quickly gained international recognition with his works. From the mid-1970s, Höller also composed at the Paris research institute IRCAM, where Pierre Boulez had invited him, and in 1989 his opera Der Meister und Margarita (after the novel of the same name by Mikhail Bulgakov) was premièred at the Grand Opéra.

From 1986 to 1990 Höller was lecturer in analysis and music theory at the Musikhochschule Köln. Subsequently, he succeeded Stockhausen as artistic director of the WDR Studio for Electronic Music from 1990 to 1999. In 1993 he accepted a call to the Hochschule für Musik Hanns Eisler Berlin as professor of composition. As a successor to Hans Werner Henze he moved in 1995 in this same capacity to the Cologne Musikhochschule. In addition, Höller has presented lectures and held composition courses at many European and American colleges.

Since 1991, Höller has been a member of the Academy of Arts, Berlin.

== Honors ==
Höller has received numerous distinctions:

- The Bernd Alois Zimmermann Prize of the City of Cologne
- The Förderpreis of the State of North Rhine–Westphalia
- The Prize of the International Composers' Forum of UNESCO
- The Rolf Liebermann Prize for Opera Composers
- The Ordre des Arts et des Lettres in 1986 bestowed by the French Minister of Culture
- The 2010 University of Louisville Grawemeyer Award for Music Composition for the orchestral work Sphären

== Works ==
=== Compositions ===
- Fünf Stücke, for piano (1964)
- Diaphonie, for two pianos (1965, rev. 1974)
- Drei Stücke, for string quartet (1966)
- Herr, es ist Zeit (text: Rainer Maria Rilke), for soprano, flute, harp, harpsichord, celesta, and string quartet (1966)
- Topic, for large orchestra (1967)
- Sonate informelle, for piano (1968)
- Sonata, for solo cello (1968)
- Epitaph für Jan Palach, for violin and piano (1969)
- Piano Concerto no. 1, for piano and orchestra (1970)
- Horizont, electronic music (1971–72, rev. 1975)
- Décollage, for two speaking choirs, electric guitar, electrically amplified cello, electronic organ, and tape (1972)
- Tangens, for cello, electric guitar, piano, electric organ, and two analog synthesizers (1973)
- Chroma, for large orchestra and live electronics (1972–74)
- Klanggitter, for cello, piano, synthesizer, and tape (1975–76)
- Antiphon (String Quartet no. 1), for string quartet and electronically transformed string quartet on tape (1976, rev. 1984)
- Arcus, for 15 instruments, percussion, and tape (1978)
- Moments musicaux, for flute and piano (1979)
- Mythos, tone poem for 13 instruments, percussion, and electronic sounds (1979–80)
- Umbra, for large orchestra and tape (1979–80)
- Résonance, for orchestra and computer-generated sounds on tape (1981)
- Schwarze Halbinseln, for large orchestra, with vocal and electronic sounds on tape (1982)
- Pas de trois, for viola, cello, contrabass (1982)
- Traumspiel (text: August Strindberg), for soprano, large orchestra, and electronics (1983)
- Magische Klanggestalt, for large orchestra (1984)
- Improvisation sur le nom de Pierre Boulez, for 16 instrumentalists (1984)
- Piano Sonata no. 2 (Hommage à Franz Liszt) (1986)
- Der Meister und Margarita, opera in two acts after the novel by Mikhail Bulgakov (1984–89)
- Fanal, for trumpet and orchestra (1989)
- Aura, for large orchestra (1992, rev. 1996)
- Pensées (Piano Concerto no. 2), for piano, orchestra, and electronics (1993)
- Pas de deux, for cello and piano (1993)
- Tagträume, for violin, cello, and piano (1994)
- Gegenklänge, for 18 instruments (1996)
- Double, for orchestra (1996)
- Partita, for two pianos (1996)
- String Quartet no. 2 (1997)
- Initium, for piano (1998)
- Widerspiel, for two pianos and large orchestra (1996–99, rev. 2009)
- Movement, for large orchestra (1998–99)
- Herbsttag (text: Rainer Maria Rilke, for mezzo-soprano, flute, harp, harpsichord, celesta, and string quartet (1999)
- Verzweigung, for piano (1999)
- Aufbruch, for orchestra (1999)
- Ex tempore, for flute, oboe, clarinet (doubling bass clarinet), percussion, violin, viola, cello, harp, and piano (2001)
- Trias, for alto saxophone, percussion, and piano (2001)
- Der ewige Tag, for chorus, orchestra, and electronics (2001)
- Monogramme, for piano (1998–2003)
- Klangzeichen, for wind quintet and piano (2003)
- Scan, for solo flute (2003)
- Feuerwerk, for 17 instrumentalists (2004)
- Fluchtpunkte, for flute, English horn, clarinet, piano, and percussion (2006)
- Sphären, for orchestra (2001–06)
- Piano Quintet, Zweigestalt (2007)
- Doppelspiel for piano (two or four hands) (2006–09)
- Mouvements for cello and piano (2009), later expanded into the Cello Concerto
- Cello Concerto (2010–11)
- Piano Sonata no. 3 (2010–11)
- Aufschwung con tenuto, for clarinet, viola and piano (2012)
- Crossing, for ensemble and electronics (2012–13)
- Voyage for orchestra (2013–14)
- Konzert für Viola und Orchester (2016–17)

=== Writings (selective list) ===
- 1982. Gestaltkomposition oder Die Konstruktion des Organischen. In Neuland Jahrbuch II, 1981/82, edited by Herbert Henck, 140–43. Bergisch Gladbach: Neuland.
- 1989. "Composition of the Gestalt, or the Making of the Organism." Translated by Nigel Osborne. Contemporary Music Review 1, no. 1 ("1984: Musical Thought at IRCAM"): 35–40.
- 1989. "Resonance: Composition Today." Translated by Nigel Osborne. Contemporary Music Review 1, no. 1 ("1984: Musical Thought at IRCAM"): 67–76.
- 1994. Fortschritt oder Sackgasse? Kritische Betrachtungen zum frühen Serialismus. Saarbrücken: Pfau-Verlag.
- 2004. Klanggestalt—Zeitgestalt. Texte und Kommentare 1964–2003. Musik der Zeit 10, edited by Reinhold Dusella. Berlin: Boosey und Hawkes (Text) ISBN 3-7931-1697-2, and Bote und Bock (Music) ISMN M-2025-2231-8
