= Bamberger Marionettentheater =

Coordinates: 49°53′39″N 10°52′52″E

Bamberger Marionettentheater is a puppet theatre in Bamberg, Bavaria, Germany. It was founded in 1986 by Klaus Loose, using a stage from 1821 that Loose had previously used in Oldenburg for about twenty years.

Loose transferred ownership of the theatre to the city of Bamberg in 1998. Since then, the municipal owner has delegated operation to the association Freunde des Bamberger Marionettentheaters e.V. (“Friends of the Bamberger Marionette Theatre”).

Since 2005, theatre leadership has passed to others; as of recent sources the director is Maria Sebald. The theatre is housed in the Staubsches Haus in Bamberg. With seating for about 25 spectators, it is described in many sources as the smallest theatre in Bavaria.
