= Stadttheater Leoben =

Coordinates: 47.380161°N 15.093619°E

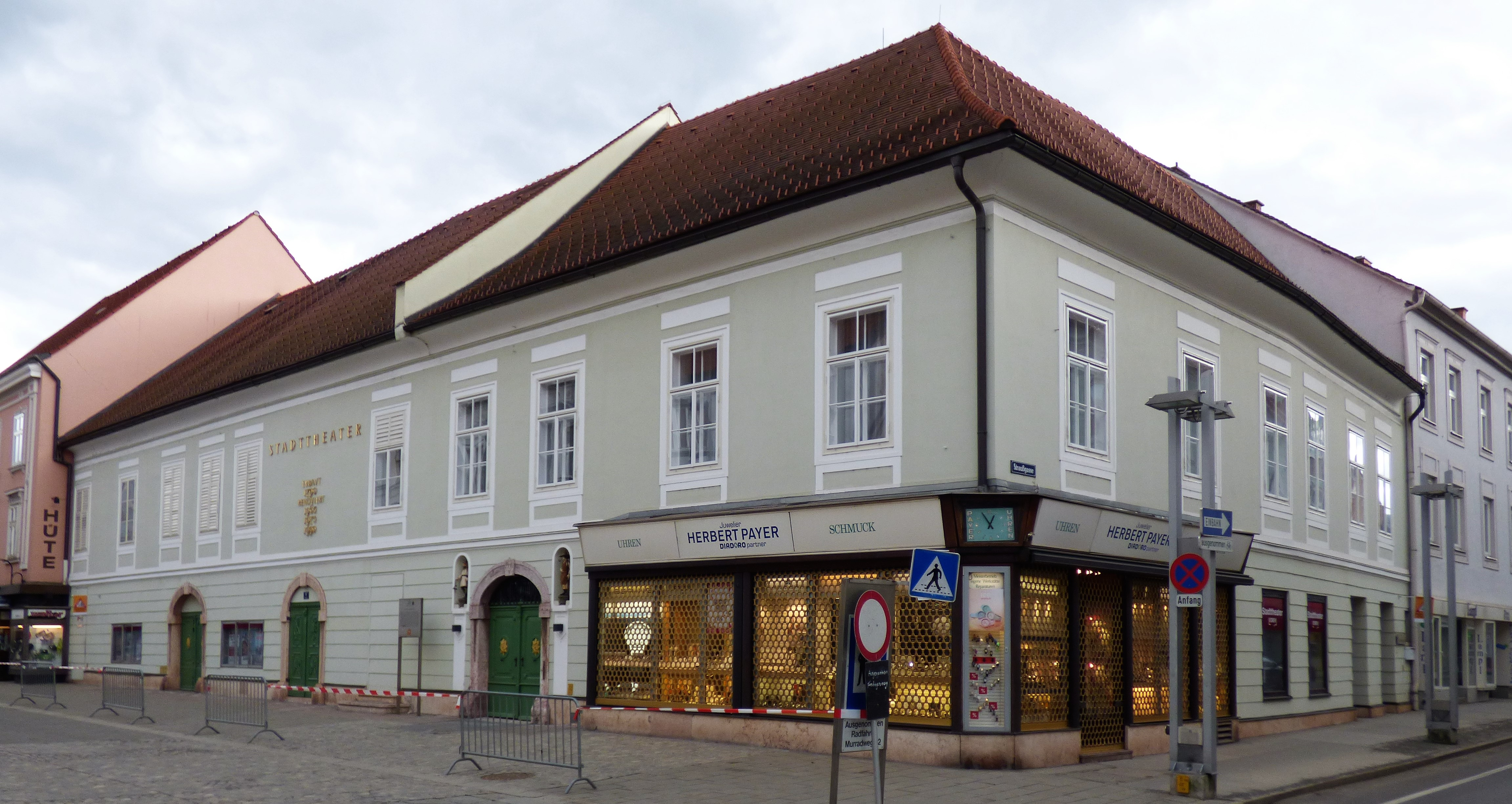
The Stadttheater

The Stadttheater Leoben is a theatre in Leoben, Austria.
