= Theater Neu-Ulm =

Theatre in Bavaria, Germany

Coordinates: 48°23′38″N 9°59′44″E

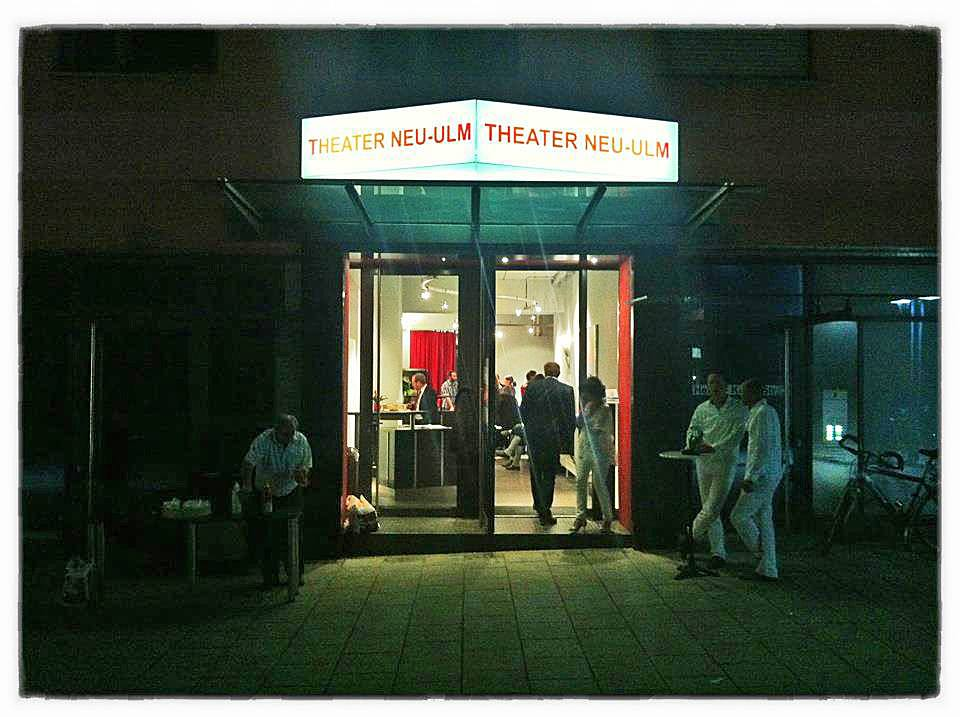
An image of Theater Neu-Ulm

Theater Neu-Ulm is a theatre in Neu-Ulm, Bavaria, Germany.
