= Velodrom (Regensburg) =

- Interactive map of the Velodrom area

General information
- Location: Regensburg, Germany
- Coordinates: 49.01991°N 12.08744°E
- Estimated completion: 1898

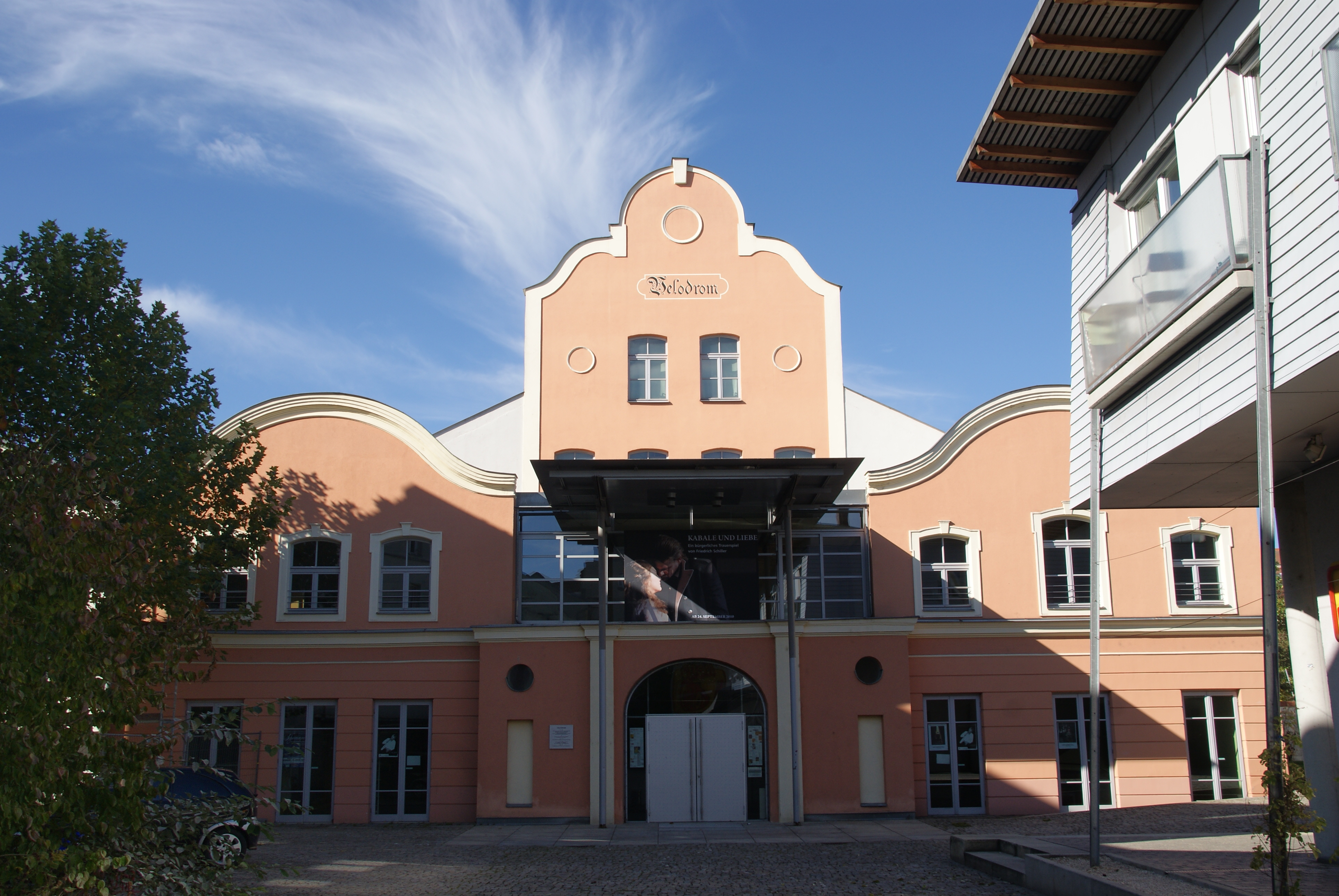
Facade of the Velodrom Regensburg

The Velodrom is a venue of the Theater Regensburg and is located on Simon-Oberndorfer-Platz at the beginning of the Westnerwacht in Regensburg. The word Velodrom comes from Velodrome, the French word for cycle racing track.

== History ==
The trigger for development of the site at Arnulfsplatz 195b was provided by businessman and bicyclist Simon Oberdorfer. He hired the young architect Joseph Koch for planning. Founded in 1891, the building first served as a hall for various cycling demonstrations for the Wanderer-Radler-Verein (Walking & Cycling Club) including artistic cycling presentations by Oberdorfer himself. In the course of planning, the idea developed to build an event center. The approval dragged on, as the city magistrate repeatedly criticized the unfavorable fire escape situation due to close quarters. Only action by Adolf Schmetzer on October 1, 1897 brought the breakthrough to obtain preliminary approval. Nevertheless, there were still a few legal pitfalls waiting. It was not until 1898, after a short construction period, that the opening took place.

Initially the Velodrom was used for many classical events with variety, dance and artistry demonstrations. Part of the variety program was artistic cycling by so-called "eccentric-cyclists", even bicycle races were included. So in fact the building at least partially served the initial purpose and justified its name. The hall was also rented for major social events. Thus, it was also used in 1904 for the General Assembly of German Catholics (51st Catholic Day). In addition, Oberdorfer hosted Social Democrats, who had no other meeting place in church-dominated Regensburg. Georg von Vollmar, Kurt Eisner, Erhard Auer and Toni Pfülf also spoke here.

In 1929, Oberdorfer had the Velodrom converted into the "Capitol Cinema" and leased the property. In 1938 he sold it to a car repair shop, which retained the previous use. In the same year, Oberdorfer and his family managed to flee the Nazis to America. Once there, they did not receive asylum and were sent back to Europe, ending up in the Netherlands. Here they were arrested by the Nazis and deported to Westerbork concentration camp and later to Sobibor, where they were murdered April 30, 1943.

The building was preserved in its initial form after the reparation in 1945, and was continued as a classic cinema. It also served as a meeting room for the denazification processes. After the decline as a family movie house it served as a porn cinema until it closed in 1974. From then on, the Velodrom served as a facade for the Regensburg theater after the interior was demolished.

The site was sold to a company in 1990, which promoted demolition due to alleged dilapidation. Under cover of darkness, a Regensburg-based architect and a steel-construction technician entered the grounds without authorization and clandestinely took material samples for examination. The results were submitted to the city council, who immediately had the building listed as a historical monument.

The building was renovated according to strict monument preservation criteria from 1990 to 1996. In addition, remains of a Roman house were discovered during the excavation work. After installing modern seating, the building will henceforth be used as an event hall.

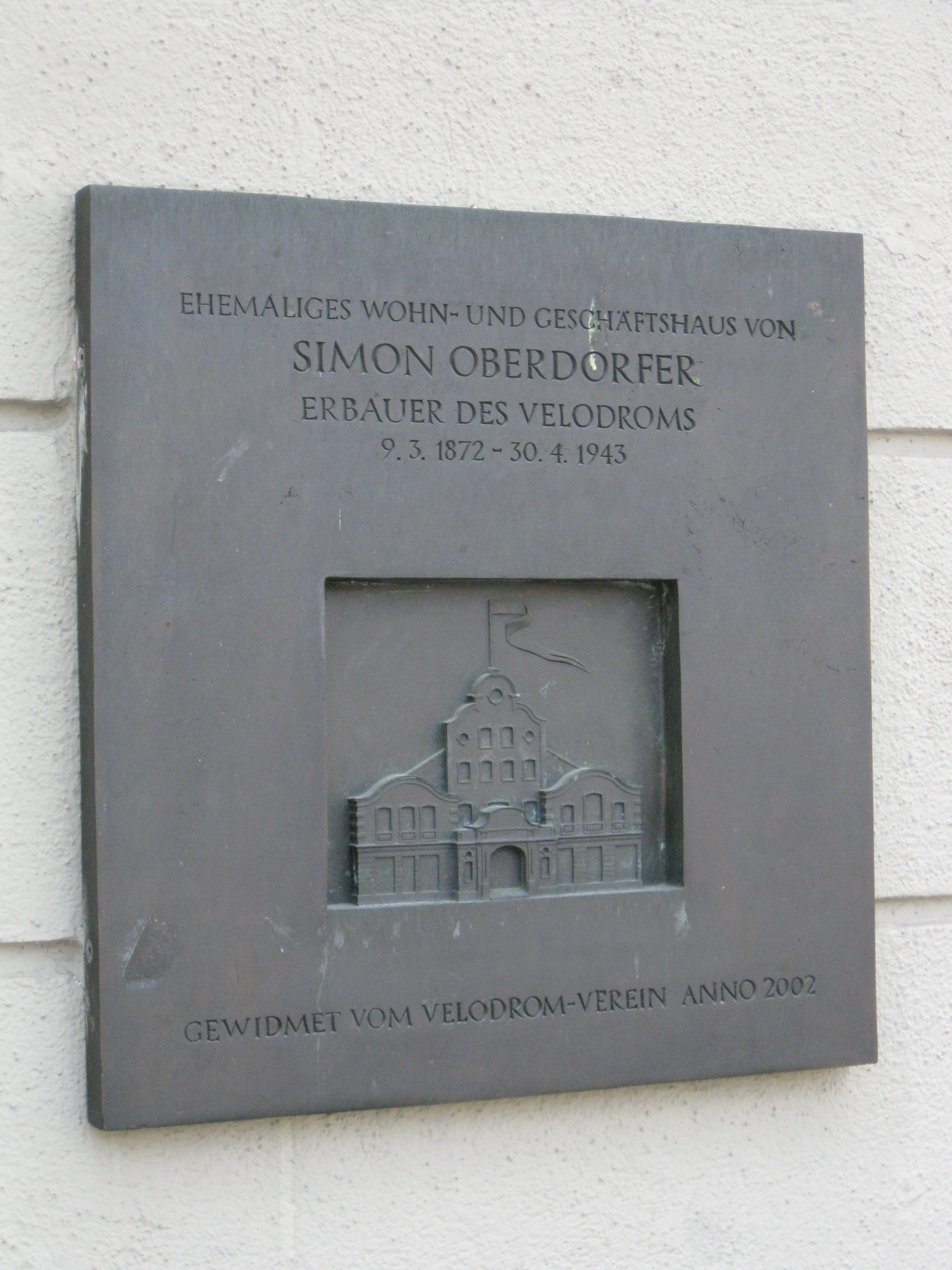
Plate in memory of Simon Oberdorfer, founder of the Velodrom Regensburg

In memory of the founder, the place in front of the Velodrom was renamed to Simon-Oberdorfer-Platz, 15 October 2017.

== Structure and equipment ==
The hall is constructed with steel trusses supporting an open-span roof. Surrounding balconies are supported by fluted columns. The mezzanine is ringed with an oval motif mimicking the curve of a velodrome. The front forms a tripartite facade. The original hall was 25 x 35 m, at the time the largest hall in Regensburg. The artistically designed roof construction corresponded to the latest standard and can be found in a similar simplified design at Cologne Cathedral. The hall was supplemented by utility rooms, cloakrooms, toilets and a boiler room, as well as a small side room to the south of the building.

The structure was quite imposing. Koch also put great emphasis on the lighting. Therefore, the room received a modern, changeable lighting system with eight carbon arc lamps. Noteworthy was the sweeping stage, the retractable fountain and the slide on the right side of the gallery.

== Equipment and modern use ==
There are currently 593 seats in the auditorium, 490 seats in 17 rows as a grandstand in the stalls, 99 seats in the gallery and four wheelchair seats. After being used as an alternative Regensburg venue during the three-year renovation of the theater on Bismarckplatz, it is now used as a venue for particularly large-scale productions, predominantly for musical, ballet and drama.
