= Theater am Michelsberg =

Theatre in Bamberg, Germany

Coordinates: 49°53′37″N 10°52′38″E

Theater am Michelsberg is a theatre in Bamberg, Bavaria, Germany. The theater closed an the end of February in 2026.
