= Comödie Fürth =

Coordinates: 49°28′16″N 10°59′14″E

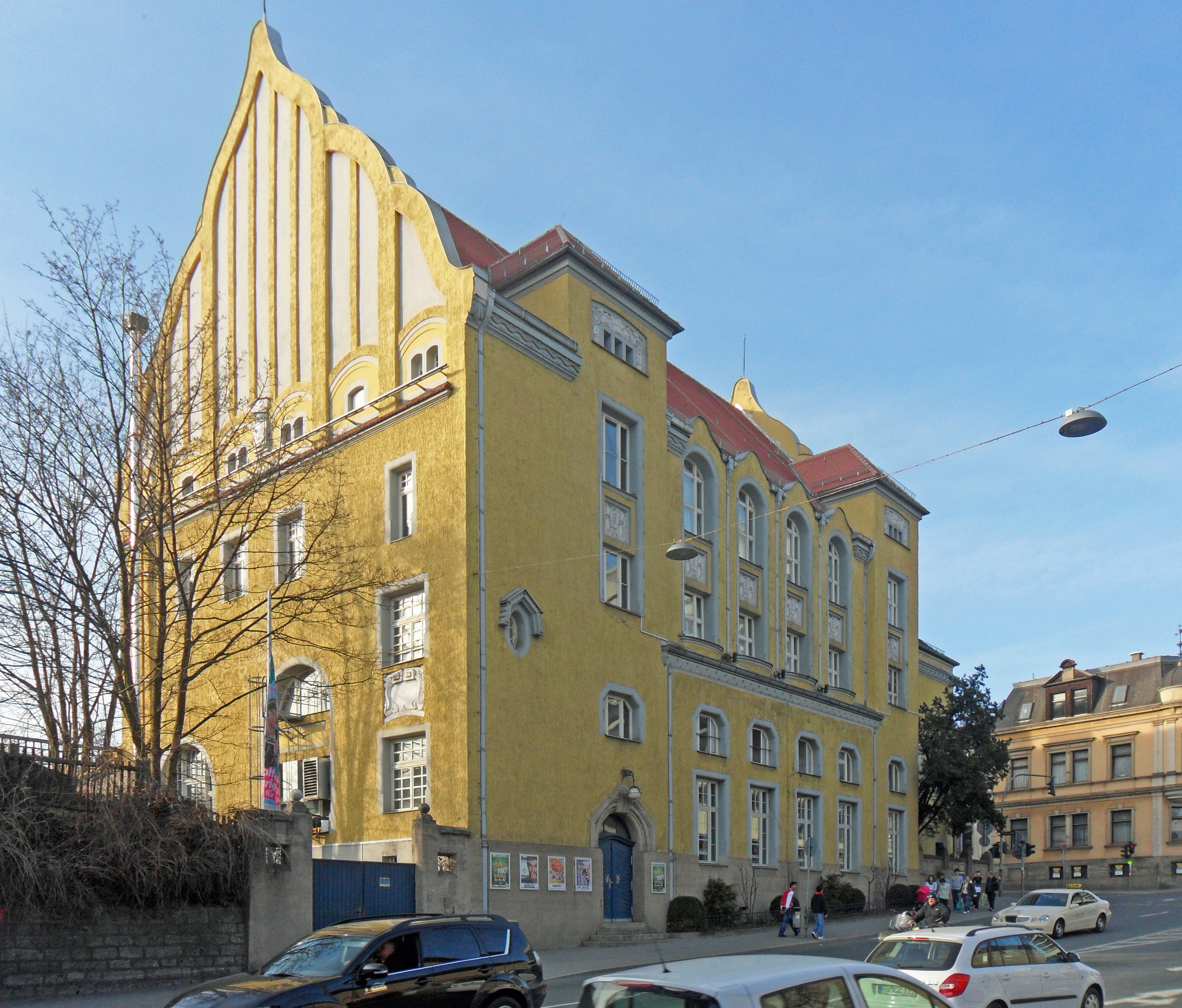
An image of Comödie Fürth

Comödie Fürth is a theatre in the city of Fürth, Bavaria.
