= Kleines theater – Kammerspiele Landshut =

Theatre in Landshut, Bavaria, Germany

Coordinates: 48°32′21″N 12°09′17″E

Kleines theater – Kammerspiele Landshut is a theatre in Landshut, Bavaria, Germany.
