= Altes Stadttheater Eichstätt =

Coordinates: 48°53′27″N 11°11′02″E

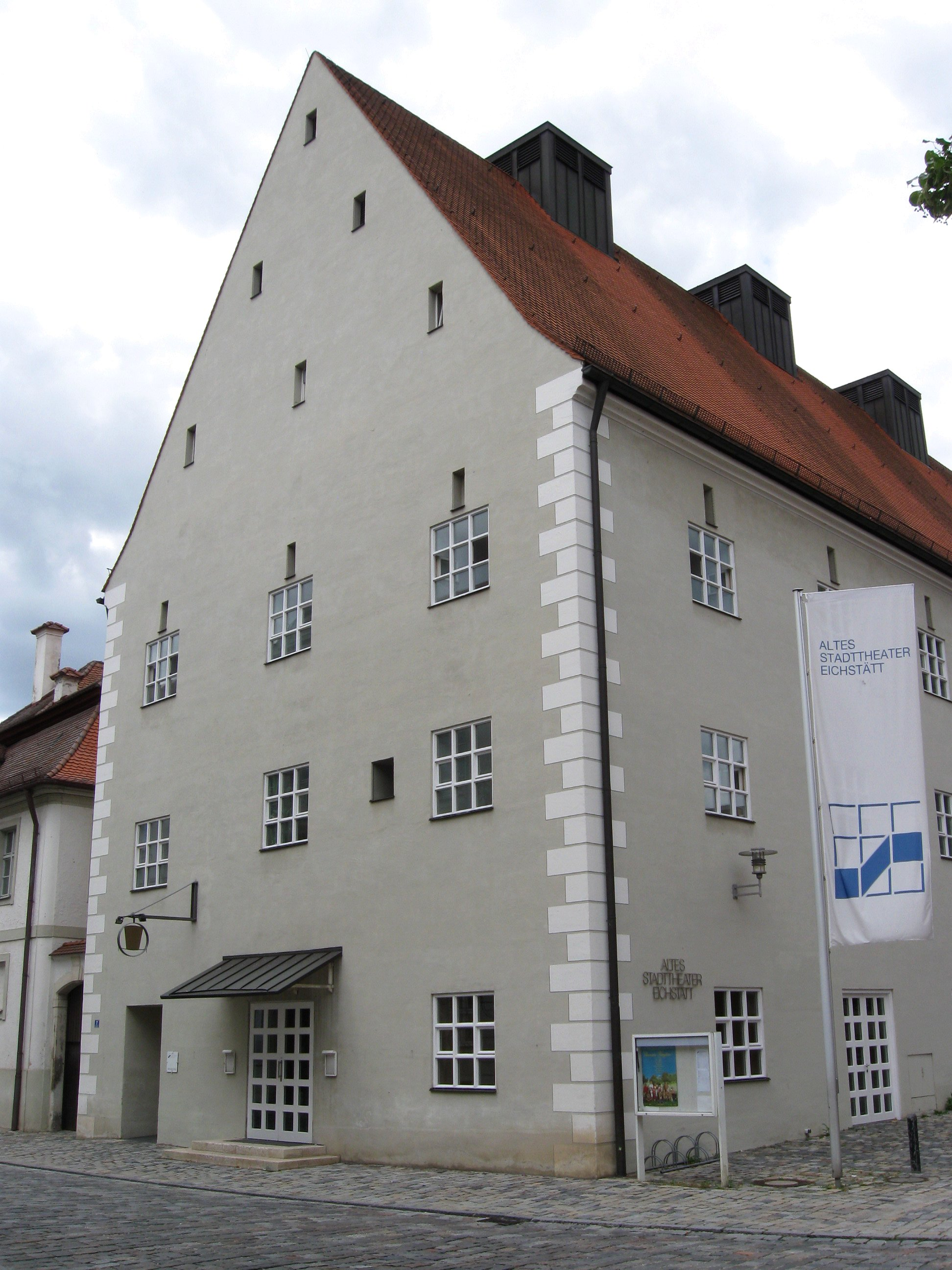
Altes Stadttheater, Eichstätt

Altes Stadttheater Eichstätt is a theatre in Eichstätt, Bavaria, Germany.
