= Historisches Stadttheater Weißenhorn =

Theatre in Weißenhorn, Bavaria, Germany

Coordinates: 48°18′19″N 10°09′23″E

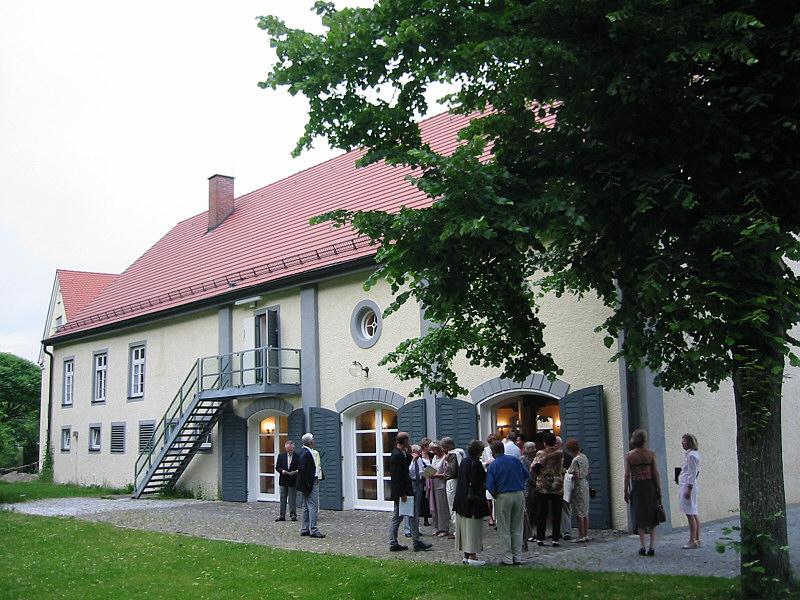
Weissenhorn Stadttheater Hofseite

Historisches Stadttheater Weißenhorn is a theatre in Weißenhorn, Bavaria, Germany. It was first opened in 1876 and, with a total of 142 seats, is the smallest public theatre in Bavaria.
