= Stadttheater Amberg =

Theatre in Amberg, Upper Palatinate, Germany

Coordinates: 49.4456°N 11.8539°E

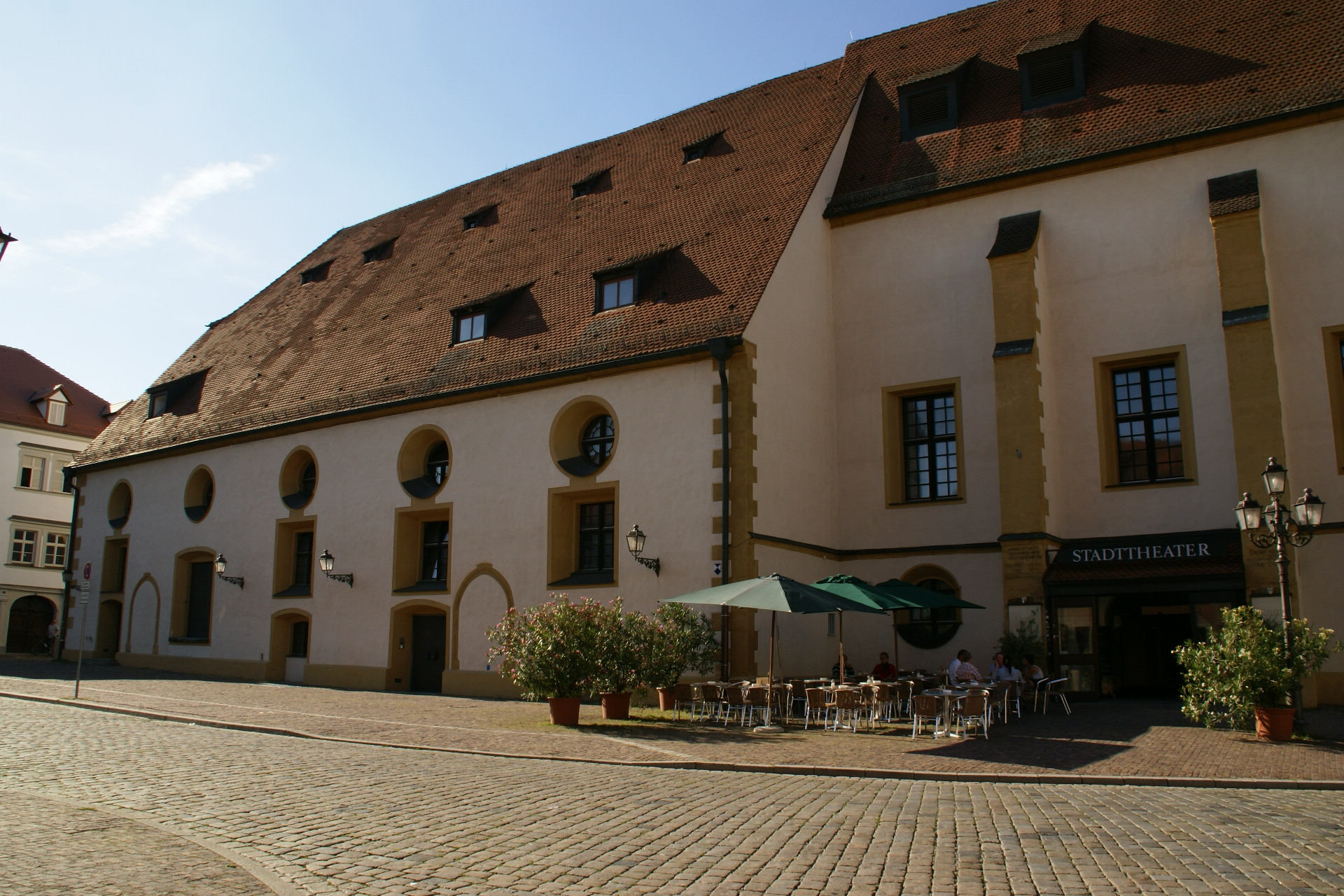
2010.08.21.172205 Stadttheater Franziskanergasse Amberg

Stadttheater Amberg is a theatre in Amberg, Bavaria, Germany.
