= Theater an der Rott =

Theatre in Eggenfelden, Bavaria, Germany

The Theater an der Rott is a theatre in Eggenfelden, Bavaria, Germany. It was opened in 1963 and is the only theatre in Germany owned by a district.
