= Stadttheater Ingolstadt =

Theatre in Bavaria, Germany

Coordinates: 48°45′47″N 11°25′44″E

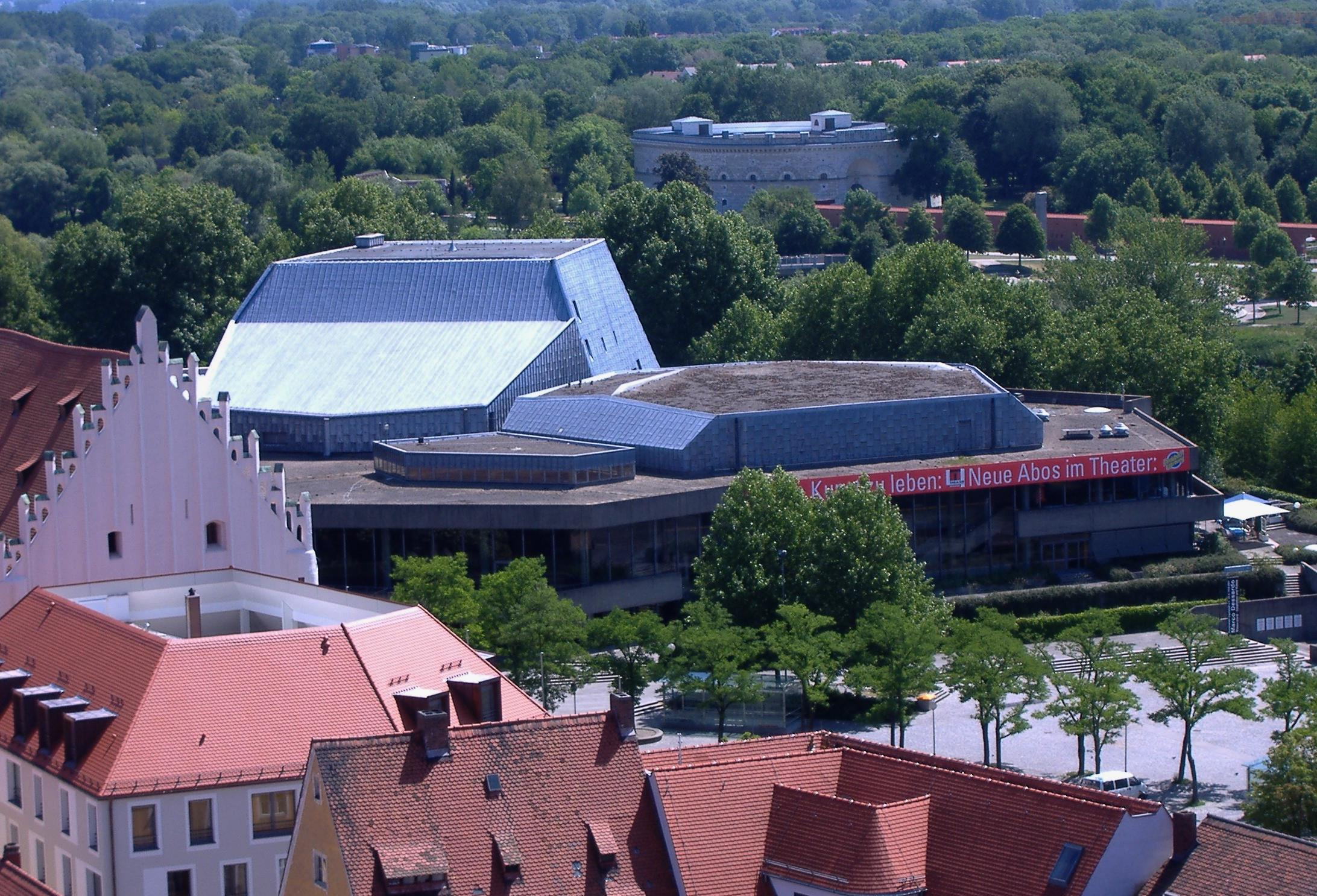
An image of Stadttheater Ingolstadt

Stadttheater Ingolstadt is a theatre in Bavaria, Germany.

== Architecture ==
After the destruction of the original building in 1945, a new theatre was built by Hardt-Waltherr Hämer und Marie Brigitte Hämer-Buro in 1964. It re-opened in 1966. For its polygonal structure, which emphazies the medieval skyline as well as the neo-classical forts of Ingolstadt (like the fortification Reduit Tilly), it received the BDA-award (a Bavarian award for architecture) 1967. A model was shown in the German pavilion during the world exhibition of Montreal the same year.
