= Theater Regensburg =

Theatre and opera house in Regensburg, Germany

Coordinates: 49°01′09″N 12°05′23″E

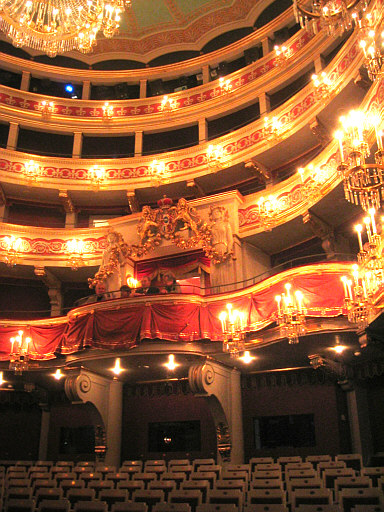
Inside view of the Theater am Bismarckplatz

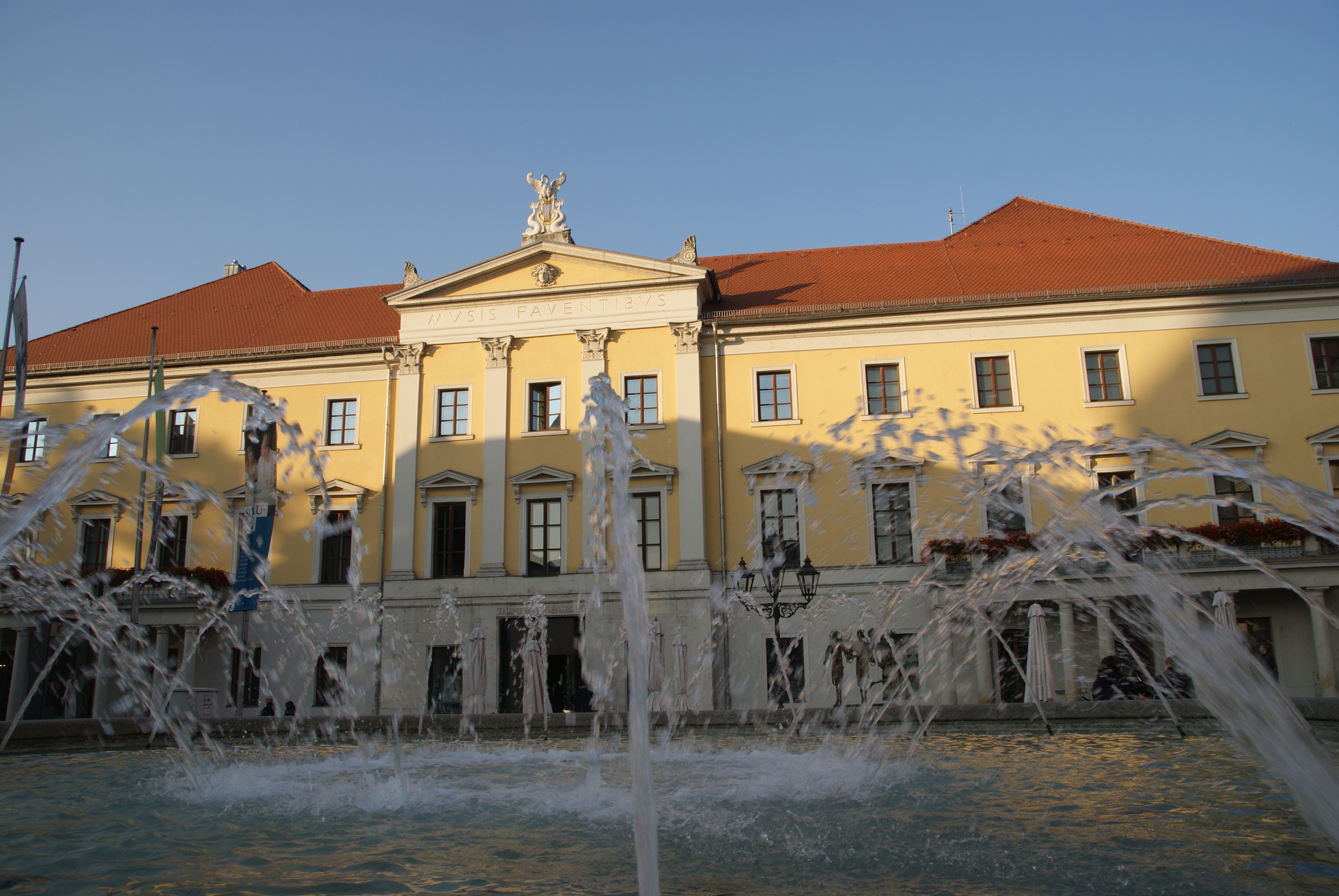
Outside view of the Theater am Bismarckplatz

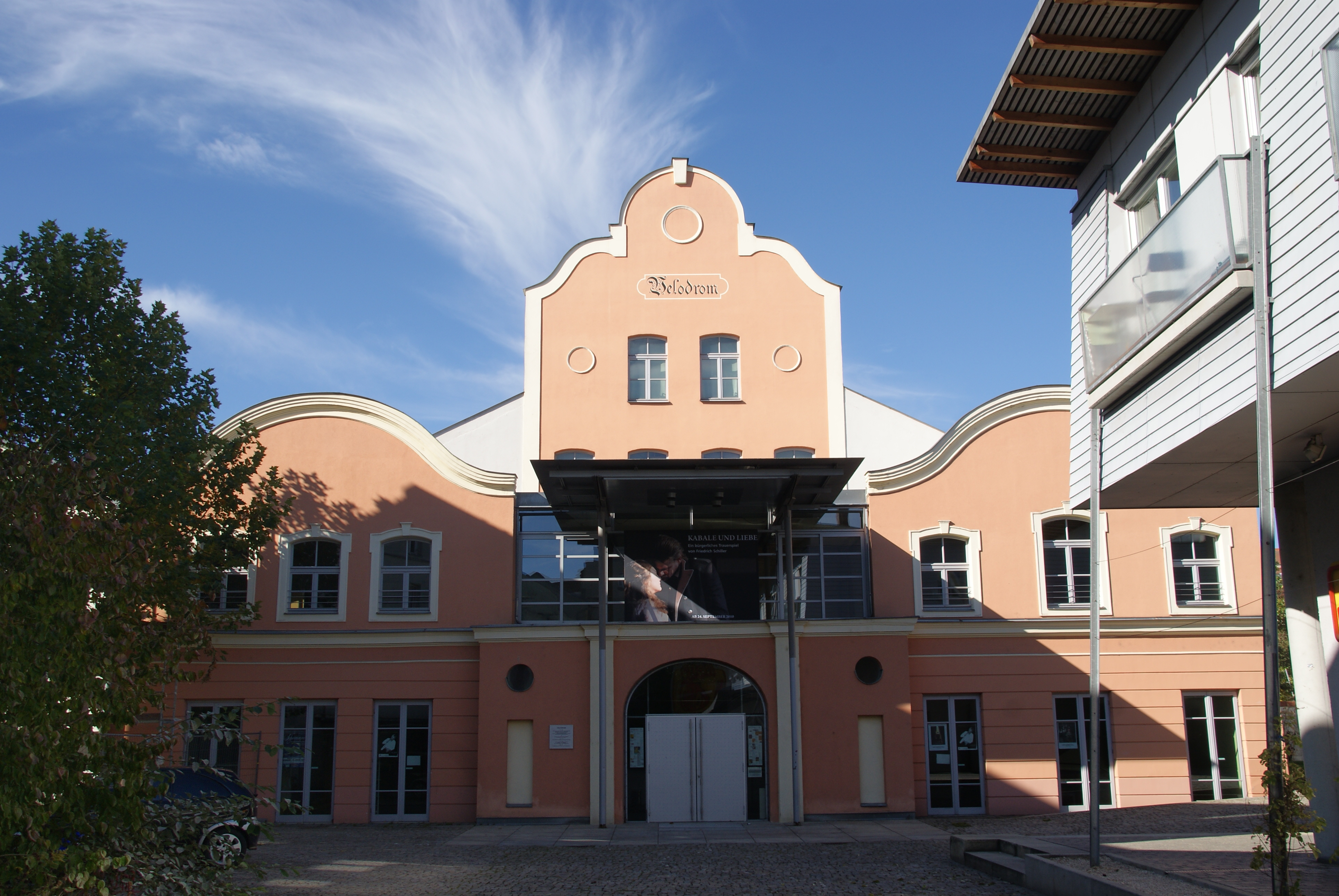
Velodrom

Theater Regensburg (also known as the Stadttheater Regensburg, theatre of the city of Regensburg) is a theatrical organization that produces operas, musicals, ballets, plays, and concerts in Regensburg, Germany. The organization operates several performance venues throughout the city.

== History ==
Theater Regensburg was established in 1804 with the opening of the Stadttheater Regensburg at Bismarckplatz 7. That theatre was designed by Emanuel Herigoyen and destroyed by a fire in 1849. The theatre was rebuilt under a new design, also by Herigoyen, and opened in 1852 with a performance of Meyerbeer's Die Hugenotten.

The theatre was modernized in 1898 and again greatly renovated in the 1990s. That theatre, now known as the Theater am Bismarckplatz, remains Regensburg's principal venue for operas and operettas. It is also occasionally used for ballets, musicals, plays, and orchestral concerts; however, the Velodrom (originally built in 1897 as a Radsporthalle, now room for 620 spectators) is the main stage for those kinds of productions. The Theater am Haidplatz with 138 seats has been used for literary and modern theater. More experimental works are often presented at the Turmtheater, a smaller venue with 88 seats.

Sebastian Ritschel has been Intendant since 2022. In March 2023, Theater Regensburg announced that Stefan Veselka had been appointed as general music director and chief conductor of the Regensburg Philharmonic.

== Premieres ==
- Georg Britting / Erwin Weill (1885–1943[?]): An der Schwelle (cycle of one act works, lost), 27 March 1913 (Theater am Bismarckplatz)

- Madame (Weill / Britting)
- Potiphar (Britting)
- Der törichte Jüngling (Britting)

- Richard Billinger: Die Hexe von Passau, 1935 (Theater am Bismarckplatz)
- Ernst Wiechert: Der armen Kinder Weihnachten, 1946 (also in Stuttgart)
- Michael Ende (libretto) / Wilfried Hiller (music): Der Lindwurm und der Schmetterling, 11 January 1981 (Theater am Bismarckplatz)
- Jürg Amann: Nachgerufen, 1984 (Theater am Haidplatz?)
- Harald Grill: Dem Hans sei Ganshaut oder wo die Liebe hinfällt, 5 October 1985 (Theater am Haidplatz)
- Harald Grill: Jorinde und Joringel im Wackersdorfer Wald, . November 1987 (Theater am Haidplatz)
- Harald Grill: Vater unser, 1997(?)
- Paula Köhler (libretto) / Thomas Bartel (music): Der Patient, 15 April 2005 (Theater am Haidplatz)
- Luisella Sala: La porta aperta, 5. Dezember 2007 (Turmtheater)
- Franz Csiky (libretto) / József Sári (music): Der Hutmacher, 29 March 2008 (Velodrom)
- Eva Demski: Die blaue Donau, 11. April 2008 (Theater am Bismarckplatz)
- Sandra Hummel (libretto) / Franz Hummel (music): Zarathustra, opera in 12 scenes, 24 April 2010 (Theater am Bismarckplatz)

== Literature in German ==
- Helmut Pigge: Theater in Regensburg, MZ-Buchverlag, Regensburg 1998. ISBN 3-931904-40-7
- Magnus Gaul: Musiktheater in Regensburg in der ersten Hälfte des 19. Jahrhunderts. Studien zum Repertoire und zur Bearbeitungspraxis (= Regensburger Beiträge zur Musikgeschichte 3), Schneider-Verlag, Tutzing 2004.
- Christoph Meixner: Musiktheater in Regensburg im Zeitalter des Immerwährenden Reichstages (= Musik und Theater 3), Studio-Verlag, Sinzig 2008.
