= Stadttheater Kempten =

Theatre in Kempten, Bavaria, Germany

Coordinates: 47°43′40″N 10°19′05″E

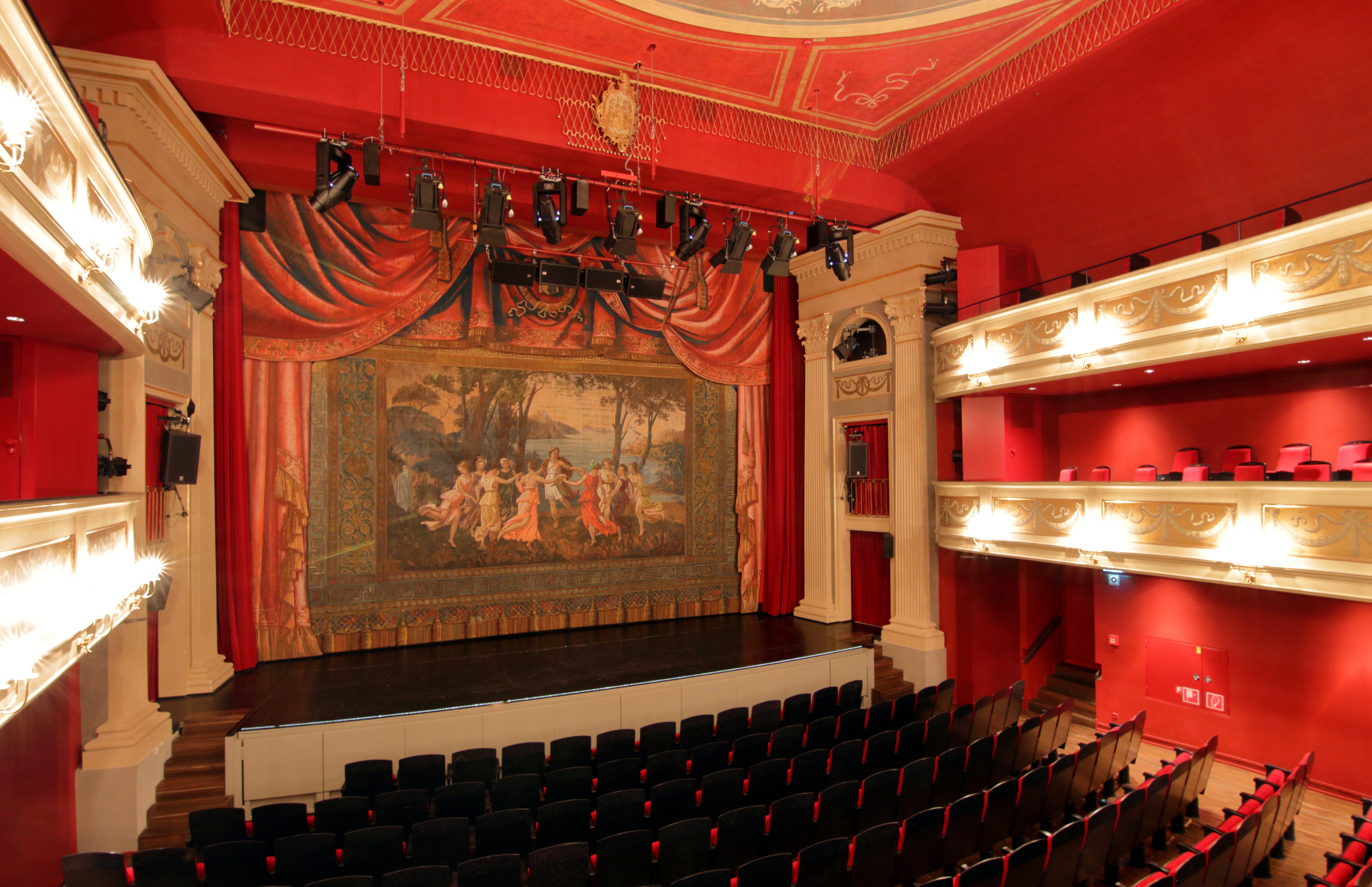
An image of Stadttheater Kempten

Stadttheater Kempten is a theatre in Kempten, Bavaria, Germany.
