= Stadttheater Passau =

Theatre in Passau, Bavaria, Germany

Coordinates: 48°34′25″N 13°27′53″E

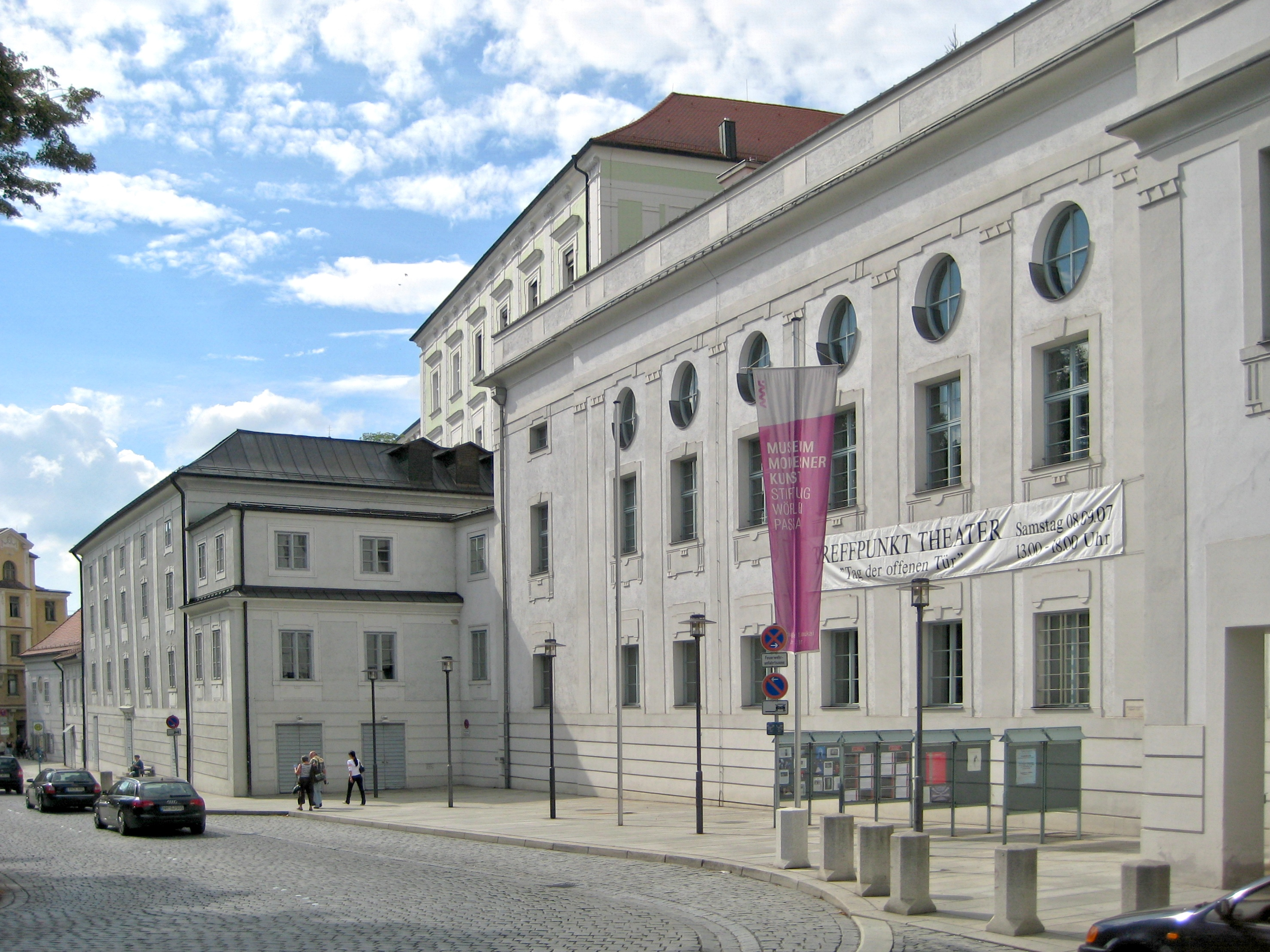

Stadttheater Passau is a theatre in Passau, Bavaria, Germany.
