= Stadttheater Lindau =

Theatre in Lindau, Bavaria, Germany

Coordinates: 47.545903°N 9.687305°E

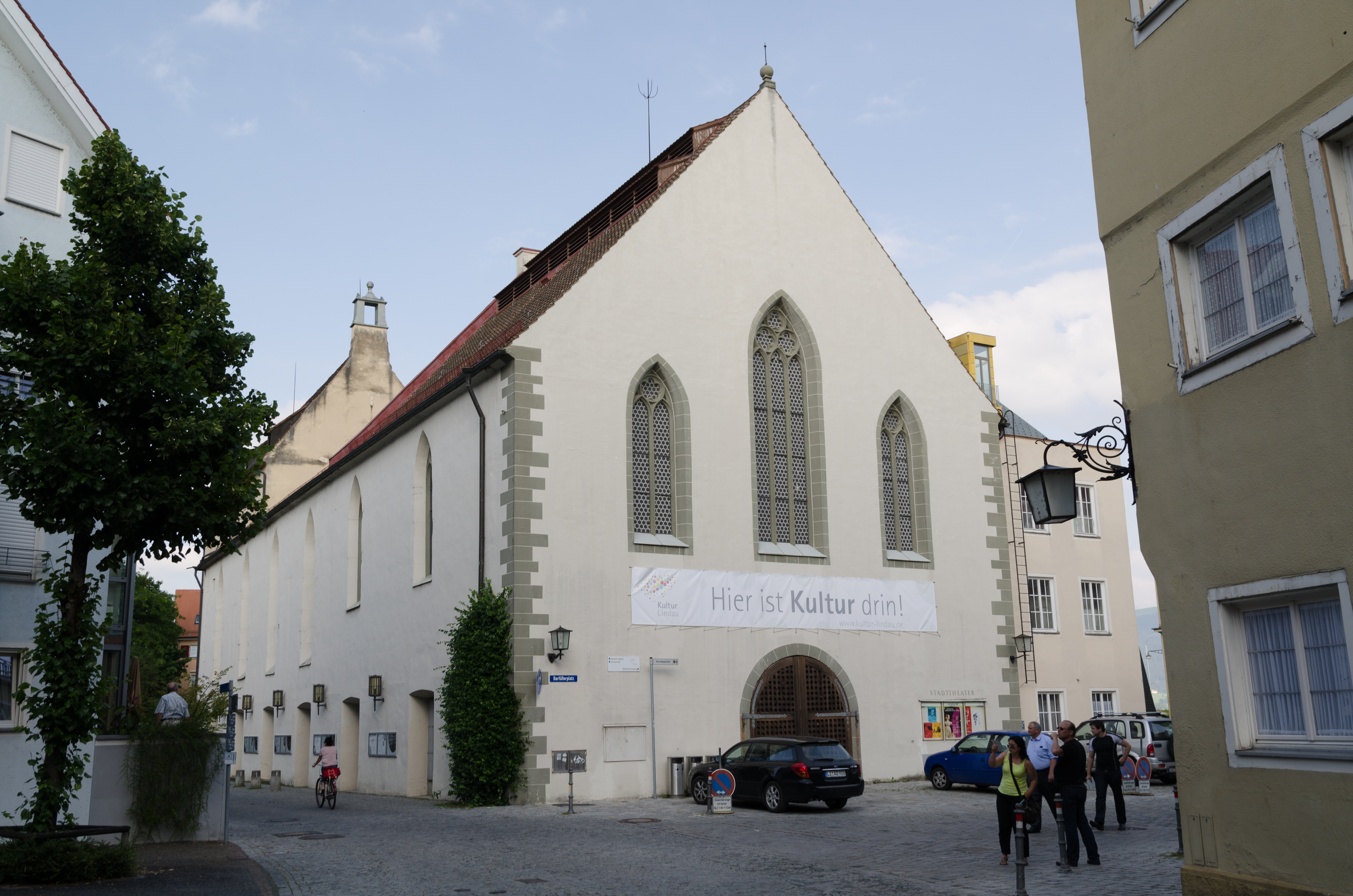

Stadttheater Lindau is a theatre in Bavaria, Germany.
