= Antikenfestspiele =

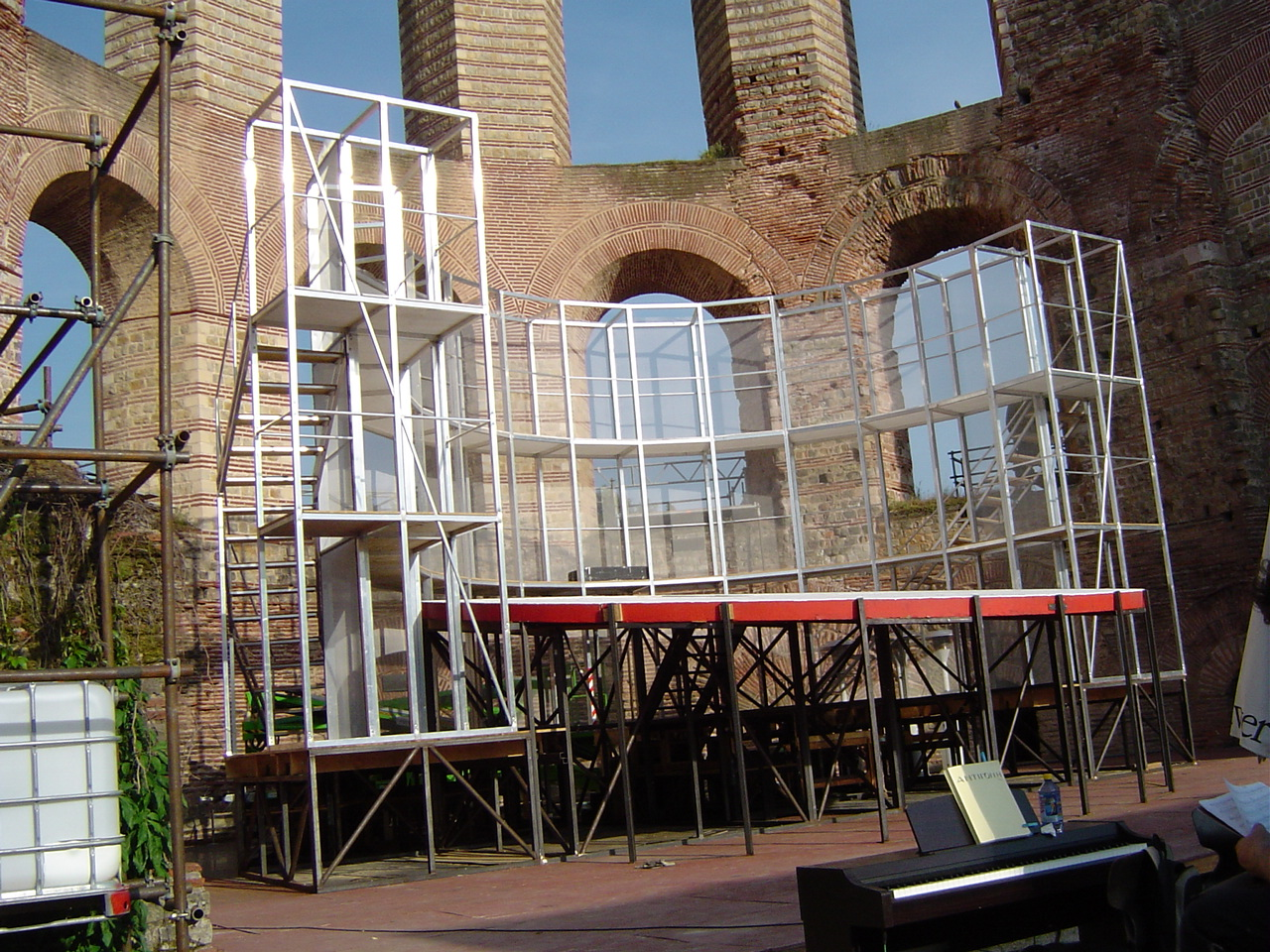

Antikenfestspiele was a summer theatre and opera festival that ran from 1998 to 2010 in Trier, Germany. Plays and operas drawn from Greek and Roman sources were performed in the open air at the city's Roman baths and amphitheatre.

Funding was not found for the season of 2011, and the festival was closed.
