= Stadttheater Fürth =

Theater in Fürth, Bavaria, Germany

Coordinates: 49°28′31″N 10°59′30″E

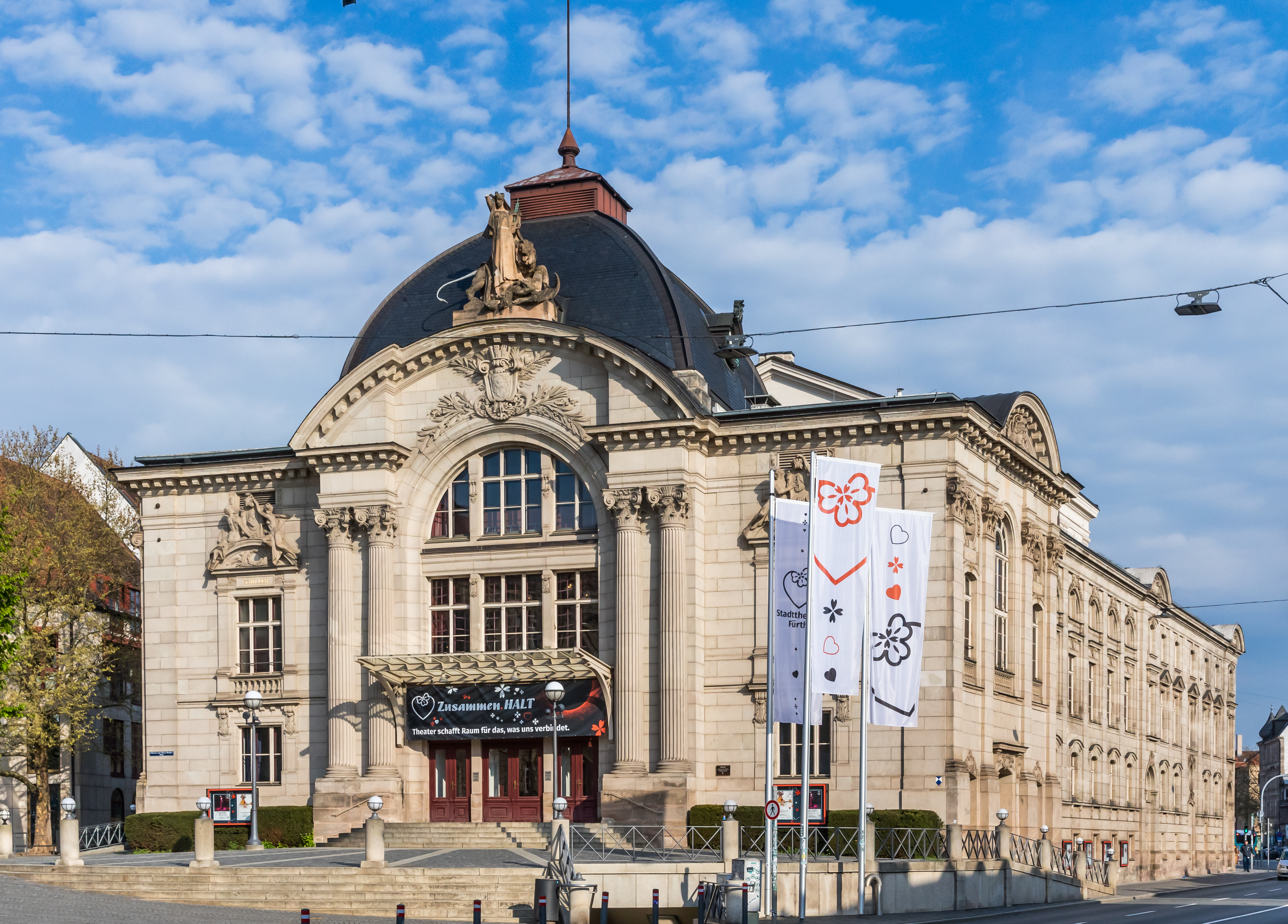
Stadttheater Fürth

Stadttheater Fürth is a theatre in Fürth, Bavaria, Germany. It was designed by the Viennese architecture office Fellner & Helmer in the Baroque Revival style, and completed in 1902. The interior was done in the Neorococo style. The theatre can accommodate 730 people across 3 levels.

The architects were originally commissioned with planning and construction of the Schiller Theatre in Czernowitz (now Olha Kobylianska Theatre in Chernivtsi, Ukraine). However, construction there has been postponed due to financing problems and the architects used the plans for the Fürth Theater instead. In 1905, the construction was completed in Czernowitz, leaving both cities with nearly identical theatres.
