= Hans-Sachs-Chor Nürnberg =

German mixed choir

The Hans-Sachs-Chor Nürnberg is a large concert and oratorio mixed choir with currently about 90 members. It has been directed by Guido Johannes Rumstadt since 2014.

== History ==
=== 1891–1926 Workers' Choral Society "Union" ===
After the repeal of Bismarck's Anti-Socialist Laws, numerous social democratic and trade union Vereins were founded. In Nuremberg, for example, 1891 the forerunner of the Hans Sachs Choir: the Arbeitergesangverein Union, a men's choir. It pursued the goal of practising music and folk culture and bringing it to the working classes This was mainly done through the artistic decoration of festivals. Joint performances of the choir with the Staatsphilharmonie Nürnberg can be traced from about 1910. In 1911, the first "chair concert" took place, at which "no drinks were served and smoking was forbidden".

=== 1926–1933 Volkschor "Hans Sachs" ===
In 1926, the workers' choral society "Union" joined forces with the "Volkschor Nürnberg-West" and the "Volkschor Nürnberg-Süd". From now on women were also allowed to sing: A large mixed choir was formed. The name "Volkschor" emphasised, in the spirit of the workers' movement, the right to education and cultural activity for all people. The Nuremberg shoemaker-poet Hans Sachs was chosen as the patron saint, who served as a model for the connection between artistic and worker activity and whose life and work had itself become the subject of art, for example in the poem Hans Sachsens poetische Sendung (1776) by Johann Wolfgang von Goethe and the operas Hans Sachs (1840/45) by Albert Lortzing and Die Meistersinger von Nürnberg (1845–68) by Richard Wagner.

The activity of the folk choir "Hans Sachs" ended with the beginning of the National Socialist era. In the first months of 1933, the choir was dissolved by the state. "Members in state, public and municipal service" were induced to leave the choir, which was accused of having "marxist Attitude" were charged with resigning, so that "any financial basis for the continuation of the association was lacking". This was the reason for dissolving the choir and thus the association on 9 April 1933.

=== Re-foundation after liberation ===
In 1947, the re-foundation took place with the approval of the American Military Government. Subsequently, a larger concert was held every two to three years.

=== Since 1968: Hans Sachs Choir ===
In 1968, Wolfgang Riedelbauch, then répétiteur at the Theatre Regensburg, took over the direction of the choir. Under him it received its present name: Hans-Sachs-Chor. The cultivation of classical oratorio literature, taking into account historical performance practice, and the performance of new works became the programme that is still valid today.

From 2000 to 2013, Julian Christoph Tölle, lecturer at the Faculty of Education at the University of Erlangen–Nuremberg, has been the director of the Hans Sachs Choir. Among other things, he facilitated the cooperation with Singer Pur and the Ensemble Kontraste. In February 2014, the general meeting of the Hans Sachs Choir elected Guido Johannes Rumstadt as the new artistic director. The cooperation with him began in July 2014. The provisional direction of the choir in the first half of the year was taken over by Marco Mulzer – the previous assistant to Julian Tölle.

Rumstadt is professor of orchestra and conducting at the Nuremberg University of Music and has worked as First Kapellmeister at the Nuremberg State Theatre since 2007. He studied conducting in Karlsruhe, Hamburg and Salzburg. His first positions as Kapellmeister took him to the Staatstheater Mainz, the Badisches Staatstheater Karlsruhe and as First Kapellmeister to the Staatstheater Wiesbaden and the Frankfurt Opera. During this time, Guido Johannes Rumstadt made guest appearances at numerous international opera houses, including the English National Opera, New York City Opera, Deutsche Oper Berlin, Cologne Opera and La Monnaie Brussels.

From 1998 to 2004, Guido Johannes Rumstadt was general music director of the Regensburg Theatre. A special focus of his work was the performance of contemporary and forgotten works. In 2001, he was nominated Conductor of the Year by the professional journal Opernwelt.

Rumstadt will make his debut with the Hans Sachs Choir by rehearsing for the Klassik Open Air of the Nuremberg Symphony Orchestra on 9 August in the Luitpoldhain.

The Hans Sachs Choir is a member of the Verband Deutscher Konzertchöre (VDKC). It founded the Arbeitsgemeinschaft Nürnberger Konzertchöre (NKC).

== Management ==
The choir is organised as an association. Chairpersons and artistic directors are elected by the members.

=== Chairperson ===
- 19??–1933 and 1947–19?? Paul Rößner
- 19??–1961 Karl Witte
- 1961–1968 Hans Schneider
- 1968–1970 Gerhard Seitz
- 1970–1973 Ernst Wegmann
- 1973–1975 Gerhard Beißwanger
- 1975–1983 Dietmar Hölzl
- 1983–1991 Walter Eiblmaier
- 1991–1999 Hannspeter Beßler
- 1999–2001 Christa Demuß-Luma
- 2001–2003 Hannspeter Beßler
- Since 2003 Michael Langer

=== Artistic direction ===
- 19??–1933 Lothar Kraus (Kapellmeister)
- 1949–19?? Robert Seiler (1908–2000; director of the Meistersinger-Konservatoriums)
- 19??–1968 Hans Hofmann
- 1968 Heinz Prandl (provisional)
- 1968–1999 Wolfgang Riedelbauch
- 2000–2013 Julian Christoph Tölle
- 2014 Marco Mulzer (provisional)
- since 2014 Guido Johannes Rumstadt

== Honours ==
- Zelter-Plakette

== Premieres ==
- Anton Bruckner: Psalm 146 A major (WAB 37; 1845–56[?]). 28 November 1971, Nuremberg (Meistersingerhalle; Ursula Wendt [soprano], Ingeborg Russ [alto], Frieder Stricker [tenor], Siegmund Nimsgern [bass]; Nürnberger Symphoniker; conductor: Wolfgang Riedelbauch). Recording (LP): Colosseum SM 548
- Heinrich Hartl: Zu beiden Händen (op.141). Text: Paul Celan. 2 December 2007 Nürnberg (Meistersingerhalle; Kirsten Drope [soprano], Christian Hilz [baritone]; Ensemble Kontraste; Leitung: Julian Christoph Tölle). Recording (Bayerischer Rundfunk/ Studio Franken)
- Dieter Salbert:
  - Tageszeiten. A secular oratorio based on poems by Rahel Mann (born 1937) for 2 solo sopranos, choir, orchestra, organ, percussion and synthesizer. 18 June 1985, Heinrich Hartl (Meistersingerhalle; conductor: Wolfgang Riedelbauch)
  - Europa. Musik für den Frieden for soprano, bass, choir and orchestra. Text: Nelly Sachs among others, 20 November 1991 Heinrich Hartl (Meistersingerhalle; conductor: Wolfgang Riedelbauch)
  - Shalom, Luther... for Choir and trombone (after Martin Luther's Choral Ein feste Burg ist unser Gott). 7 June 1996, Nuremberg. (St. Egidien, Nuremberg; conductor: Wolfgang Riedelbauch)
- Kerstin Thieme:
  - Requiem. 10 April 1998 Nuremberg (Meistersingerhalle; Marlis Petersen [soprano], Jürgen Linn [bass]; conductor: Wolfgang Riedelbauch)

== Nuremberg premieres ==
- Johanna Doderer: Salve Regina
- Luis Bacalov: Misa Tango (text: Spanish version of the holly mass)
- Hector Berlioz: Te Deum, L'enfance du Christ
- Anton Bruckner: Psalm 114; Psalm 112; Requiem; Mass No. 1 in D minor; Missa solemnis b-Moll
- Pau Casals: El Pessebre (Die Krippe)
- Edward Elgar: The Dream of Gerontius, The Apostles, The Kingdom
- Joseph Haydn: Die sieben letzten Worte unseres Erlösers am Kreuze (Text: Gottfried van Swieten)
- Leoš Janáček: Glagolská mše (Glagolitische Messe) (text: Church Slavonic version of the holly mass)
- Franz Liszt: Via Crucis; Missa Choralis
- Gustav Mahler: Das klagende Lied
- Bernhard Molique: Abraham
- Wolfgang Amadeus Mozart: Davide Pentitente KV 469 (text: Lorenzo da Ponte[?])
- Giacomo Puccini: Messa ("Messa di Gloria")
- Ariel Ramírez: Misa Criolla
- Gioachino Rossini: Petite messe solennelle
- Dieter Salbert: Theatralische Messe (texts from the liturgy and by Rainer Kirsch, Eva Zeller, Kurt Marti, Álvaro Menéndez Leal, Eckart Bücken, Helmut Preißler); Stationen der Hoffnung (texts: Paul Gerhardt, Martin Luther, Uwe Hoppe among others)
- Franz Schubert: Magnificat
- Robert Schumann: Des Sängers Fluch (text: the eponymous ballade by Ludwig Uhland); Das Paradies und die Peri (text: Emil Flechsig)
- Giuseppe Verdi among others: Messa per Rossini

== Recordings ==
- Louis Lewandowski: Musik der Synagoge. Ein Sabbat-Gottesdienst in der ehemaligen Hauptsynagoge der israelitischen Gemeinde zu Nürnberg. Baruch Grabowski (hazzan), Werner Galas (narrator), Rolf Gröschel (organ), Hans-Sachs-Chor Nürnberg; Musical direction: Wolfgang Riedelbauch; Overall direction: Heinz Freudenthal. Colosseum Records, Nürnberg 1982.
