= Staatsphilharmonie Nürnberg =

German symphonic orchestra

The Staatsphilharmonie Nürnberg is the largest Bavarian opera orchestra after the Bavarian State Orchestra. It has 91 musicians and is the orchestra of the Staatstheater Nürnberg.

== History of the Staatsphilharmonie ==
The history of the Nuremberg State Philharmonic dates back to the old Nuremberg Imperial City Council Music, which can be traced back to 1377. After Nuremberg had already become a centre of the new art form of opera in the Baroque period, the Nuremberg council musicians were continuously called upon to perform at the newly founded "Nuremberg National Theatre" from 1801 onwards. In 1833, the orchestra moved into the newly built city theatre on Lorenzer Platz. After the opening of the opera house on the Ring (1905), in 1922 the municipal theatre orchestra was merged with the privately supported philharmonic orchestra, founded around 1880 by Hans Winderstein, and the orchestra was transferred to the municipal service. This created the Nuremberg Philharmonic Orchestra, initially with a strength of 110 musicians, which was then reduced during the economic crises of the Weimar Republic. In 1944, the Nuremberg theatre was closed and the orchestra was drafted for military service.

As early as 1946/47, performances began again under the direction of artistic director Karl Pschigode and general music director Alfons Dressel. During the directorship of Hans Gierster (1965–1988), there were highly acclaimed performances of modern operas such as Moses und Aron (Arnold Schoenberg), Die Soldaten (Bernd Alois Zimmermann), Träume (Isang Yung) and Intolleranza 70 (Luigi Nono). In 1988–1992, Christian Thielemann as GMD shaped the programme, especially with works of the German Romantic period. He was followed by Eberhard Kloke, who placed special emphasis on the Viennese School and contemporary music. Under his successor Philippe Auguin, GMD from 1998 to 2005, the Nuremberg Philharmonic Orchestra performed the complete Der Ring des Nibelungen by Richard Wagner for the first time in almost 50 years; with this, the Nuremberg State Theatre also gave a guest performance in Beijing in autumn 2005 that attracted worldwide attention. From 2006 to 2011, Christof Prick Chief Conductor of the orchestra; his work focused on a Mozart cycle as well as works by Wagner and Strauss. From 2011 to 2018, Marcus Bosch GMD of the orchestra, which was renamed the "Nuremberg State Philharmonic" in late 2011. During his tenure, the Orchestra Academy was founded, and Bosch's projects included the recording of Die Meistersinger von Nürnberg for Arte, the first live cinema broadcast of the premiere of Tristan und Isolde, and the complete recording of Dvořáks symphonic works. In 2018, Joana Mallwitz took over as conductor of the Staatsphilharmonie.

== Premieres, guest performances, series ==
The Nuremberg State Philharmonic has premiered numerous works in the opera field, for ewample by Boris Blacher, Werner Heider, Hans Werner Henze, Wilfried Hiller, Paul Hindemith, Wilhelm Killmayer, György Ligeti, Krzysztof Penderecki, Aribert Reimann, Isang Yun, Hans Zender and Bernd Alois Zimmermann. Since 2005, the International Gluck Festival has added another accent to the music theatre of the late 18th century. With the Klassik Open Air in the Luitpoldhain, the Nuremberg State Philharmonic, together with the Nuremberg Symphony Orchestra, has been staging the largest open-air classical music event in Europe since 1999. Guest tours have taken the Nuremberg State Philharmonic among others to Salzburg, Nice, Beijing, Shen Zhen and the Hong Kong Arts Festival.

The Nuremberg State Philharmonic Orchestra, which has been among the top group A of German cultural orchestras since 1981, also organises its own symphony concert series in addition to its activities as the orchestra of the Nuremberg State Theatre: the Philharmonic Concerts in the Nuremberg Meistersingerhalle. In addition, they also perform elsewhere as a concert orchestra and are active in the field of children's, school and youth concerts. In addition, they have been organising a successful series of chamber concerts (as Philharmonie e.V.) in the Jugendstil foyer of the opera house since 1994.

== Conductors and General Music Directors ==
| Period | Name |
|---|---|
| 1923–1925 | Ferdinand Wagner |
| 1925–1938 | Bertil Wetzelsberger |
| 1938–1945 | Alfons Dressel |
| 1946–1948 | Rolf Agop |
| 1948–1955 | Alfons Dressel |
| 1956–1964 | Erich Riede |
| 1965–1988 | Hans Gierster |
| 1988–1992 | Christian Thielemann |
| 1993–1998 | Eberhard Kloke |
| 1998–2005 | Philippe Auguin |
| 2006–2011 | Christof Prick |
| 2011–2018 | Marcus Bosch |
| 2018–present | Joana Mallwitz |

== See also ==
- Staatstheater Nürnberg
