= Dieter Salbert =

German composer (1932–2006)

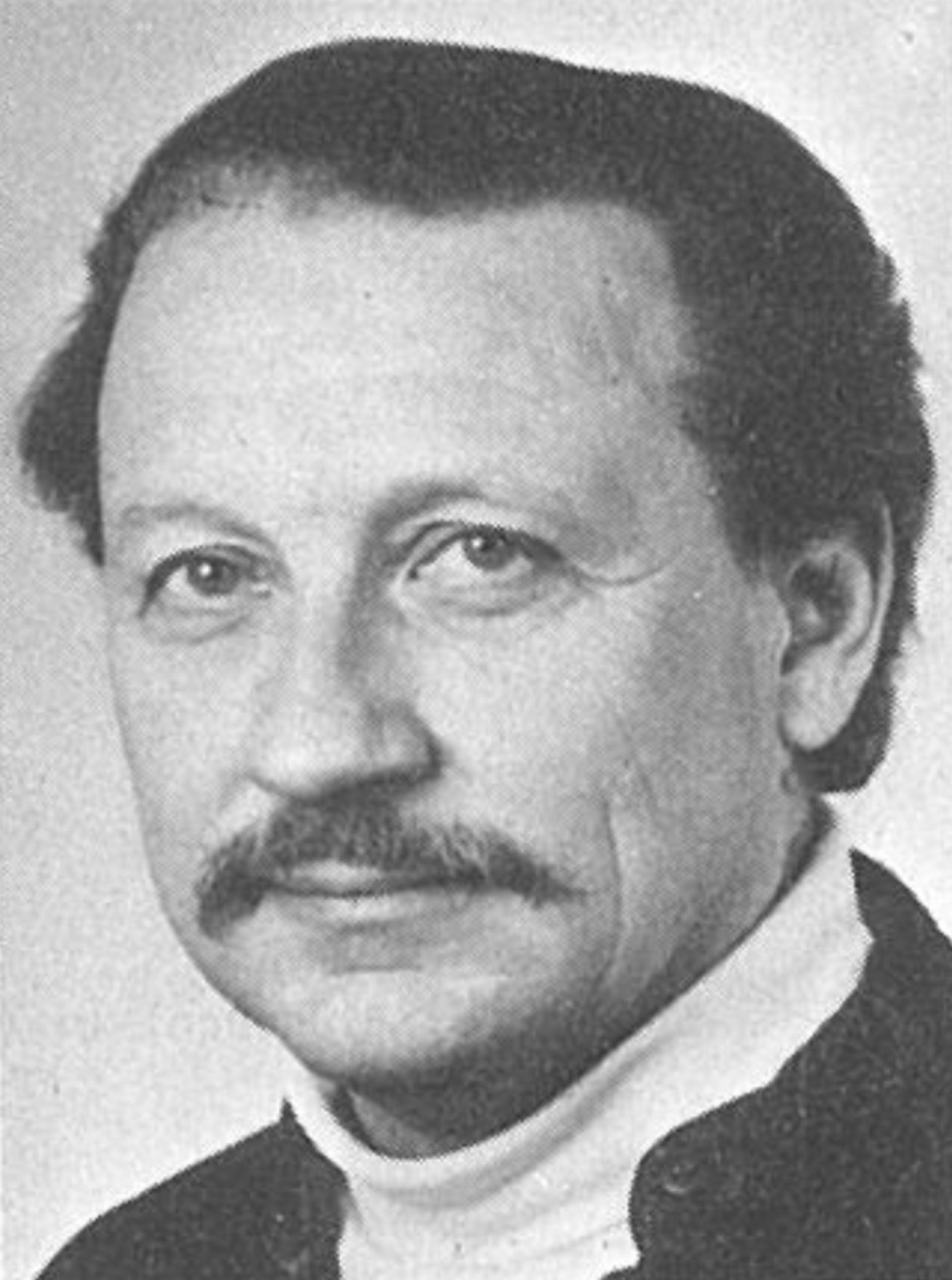
Dieter Salbert in 1985

Dieter Salbert (2 August 1932 – 6 July 2006) was a German composer.

== Life ==
Born in Berlin, Salbert received piano lessons from 1938 and began early with improvisations on piano and accordion. After his Abitur in 1952 at the Humboldt-Gymnasium in Tegel, he studied composition and piano at the Stern Conservatory and passed the final examination in composition in 1957.

From 1959, he lived in Nuremberg, where he presented his own works in the Kabarett "Die Roten Funken". Afterwards, he studied school music at the Hochschule für Musik und Theater München. In the following years he was Musikdozent at the Akademie Remscheid, at the Pädagogische Hochschule Braunschweig and at the Fachhochschule Braunschweig. In 1986, he received his doctorate in Hamburg. In 1981, he founded the "Neue Akademie Braunschweig" and established the Synthesizer Music Festival Braunschweig, which he directed until 2001.

Salbert published over 200 compositions, including orchestral and choral works, chamber music and radiophonic productions.

Salbert died in Meine aged 83.

== Honours ==
- 1965: Förderpreis der Stadt Nürnberg
- 1975: Richard-Wagner-Medaille der Stadt Bayreuth
- 1985: Niedersächsisches Künstlerstipendium
- 1986: Verdienstorden der Bundesrepublik Deutschland am Bande
- 1993: Nominierung für den Deutscher Schallplattenpreis

== Compositions ==
- Theatralische Messe. Text from the liturgy and by Rainer Kirsch, Eva Zeller, Kurt Marti, Álvaro Menéndez Leal, Eckart Bücken, Helmut Preißler. Premiere 1977 in Braunschweig (Martinikirche; Martini-Kantorei, conductor: Werner Burkhardt)
- Stationen der Hoffnung. A scenic oratorio for soprano, narrator, choir, pantomime, string orchestra, guitar, bass guitar, synthesizer, percussion and organ. Text: Paul Gerhardt, Martin Luther, Uwe Hoppe among others, premiere 1981 Braunschweig (Madrigalchor Braunschweig)
- Tageszeiten. A secular oratorio based on poems by Rahel Mann (1937) for 2 solo sopranos, choir, orchestra, organ, percussion and synthesizer. Premiere 18 June 1985 Nürnberg (Meistersingerhalle; Hans-Sachs-Chor Nürnberg, conductor: Wolfgang Riedelbauch)
- Europa. Musik für den Frieden for soprano, bass, choir and orchestra. Text: Nelly Sachs among others, premiere 20 November 1991 Nürnberg (Meistersingerhalle; Hans-Sachs-Chor, conductor: Wolfgang Riedelbauch)
- Shalom, Luther… for Choir and trombone (after Martin Luthers Choral Ein feste Burg ist unser Gott). Premiere 7 June 1996 Nürnberg (St. Egidien, Nuremberg; Hans-Sachs-Chor, conductor: Wolfgang Riedelbauch)
