= Staatstheater Nürnberg =

Theatre and opera house in Nuremberg, Germany

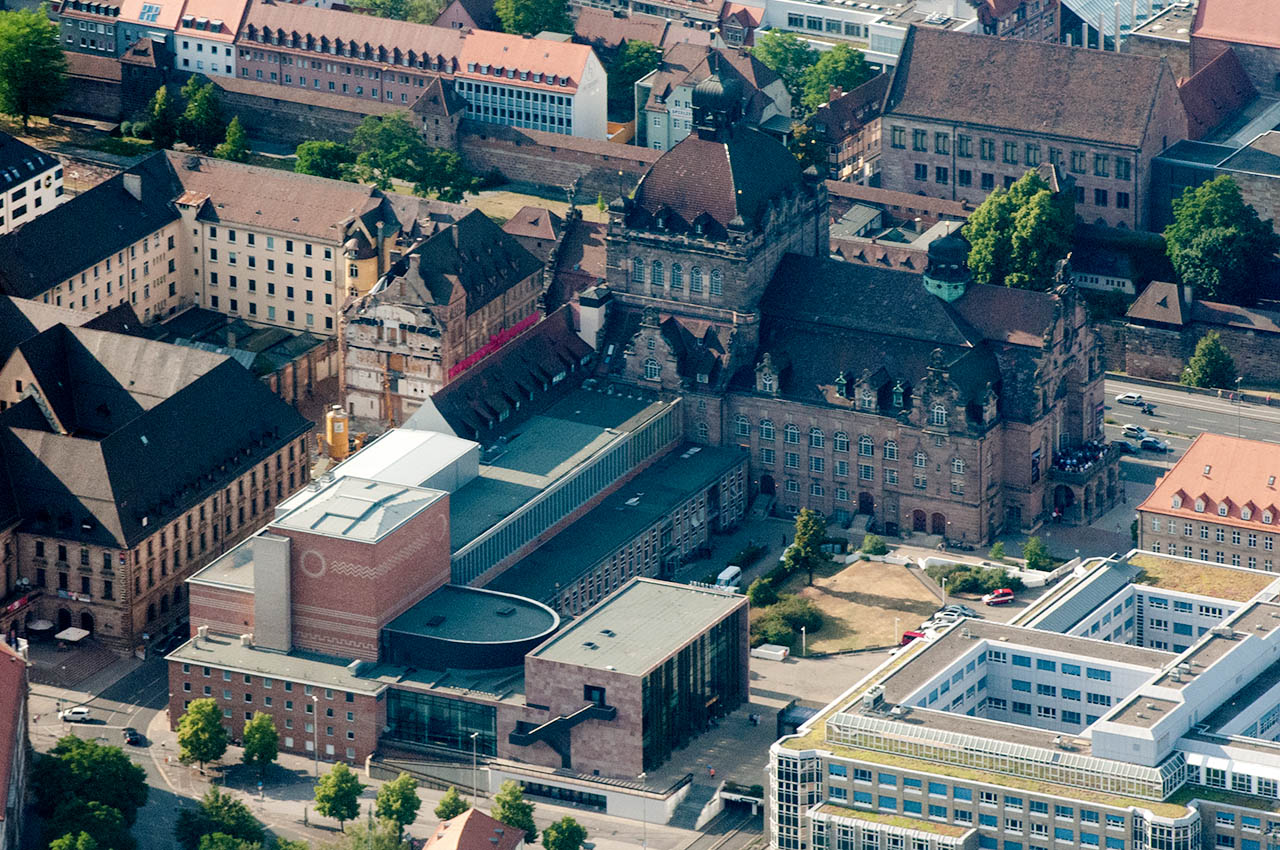
- Aerial of Schauspielhaus and Opernhaus
- Interactive map of Staatstheater Nürnberg
- Address: Nürnberg; Germany
- Coordinates: 49°26′47″N 11°04′31″E

Construction
- Opened: 1905
- Architect: Heinrich Seeling

Website
- www.staatstheater-nuernberg.de

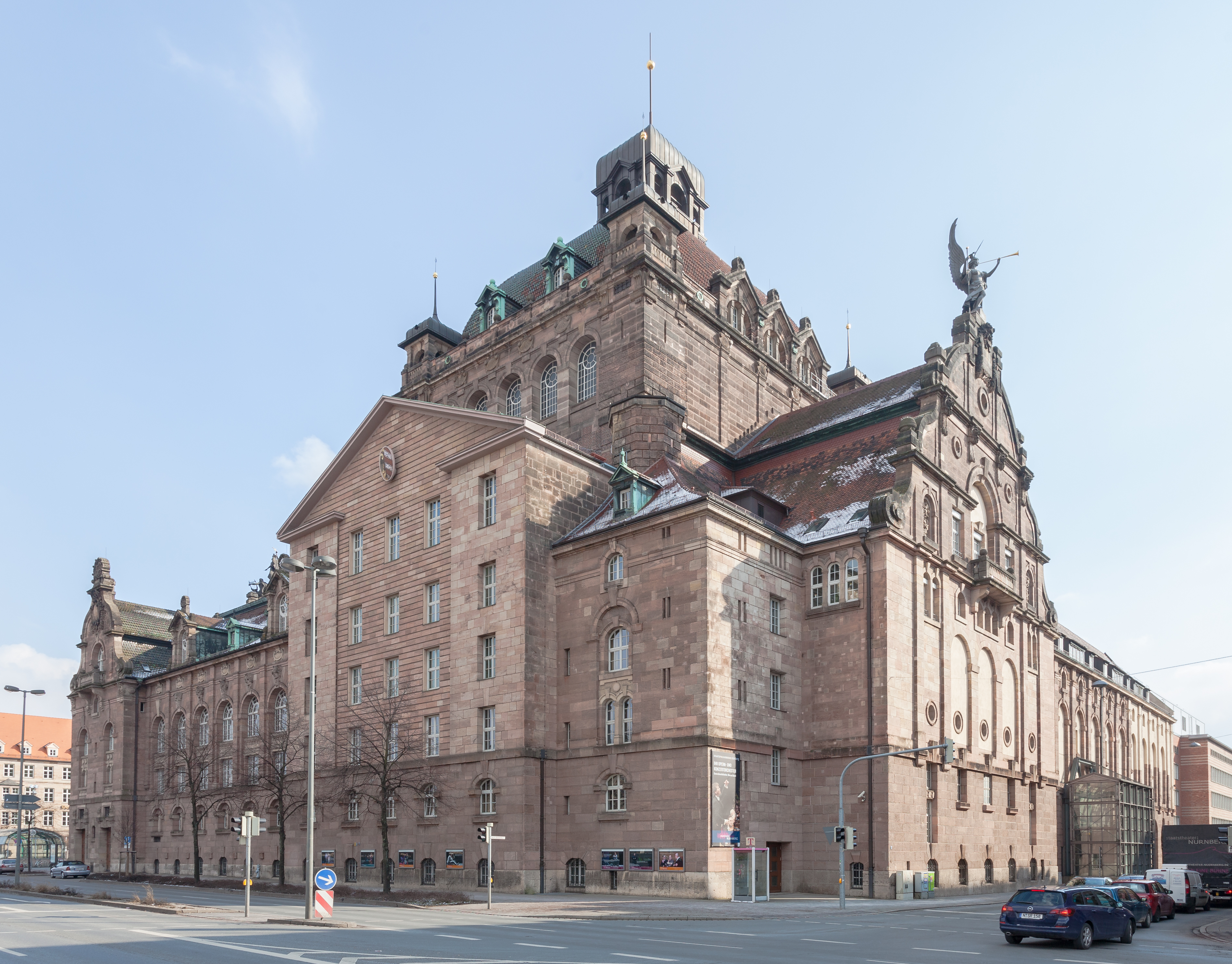
Staatstheater Nürnberg, Opera house

The Staatstheater Nürnberg is a German theatre company in Nuremberg, Bavaria. The theatre is one of four Bavarian state theatres and shows operas, plays, ballets and concerts.

== History ==
Its main venue, the opera house ("Opernhaus Nürnberg"), is one of the largest theatres in Germany. It was built from 1903 to 1905 in Art Nouveau style by the architect Heinrich Seeling. Until 1 January 2005, it was known as the "Städtische Bühnen Nürnberg". Other venues are the play house (Schauspielhaus Nürnberg) including the small stages "Kammerspiele" and "BlueBox", and the Meistersingerhalle where the concerts of the orchestra (the Staatsphilharmonie Nürnberg) are held.

From 2018 to 2023, the company's Generalmusikdirektorin (General Music Director) was Joana Mallwitz, the first female conductor to be named GMD of the company. In November 2022, the company announced the appointment of Roland Böer as its next GMD, effective with the 2023–2024 season. Böer is scheduled to conclude his tenure with the Staatsphilharmonie Nürnberg at the close of the 2026–2027 season. In July 2025, the company announced the appointment of Killian Farrell as its next GMD, effective with the 2027–2028 season.

== General Music Directors ==
- Ferdinand Wagner (1923–1925)
- Bertil Wetzelsberger (1925–1938)
- Alfons Dressel (1938–1946)
- Rolf Agop (1946–1948)
- Alfons Dressel (1948–1955)
- Erich Riede (1956–1964)
- Hans Gierster (1965–1988)
- Christian Thielemann (1988–1992)
- Eberhard Kloke (1993–1998)
- Philippe Auguin (1998–2005)
- Christof Prick (2006–2011)
- Marcus Bosch (2011–2018)
- Joana Mallwitz (2018–2023)
- Roland Böer (2023–present)

== Literature ==
- Jens Voskamp u. a. (2005), Staatstheater Nürnberg (ed.), Staatstheater Nürnberg 1905–2005: Opernhaus, Staatsoper; Vom Neuen Stadttheater am Ring zum Staatstheater (in German), Nürnberg: Müller, ISBN 3-924773-12-2
- Dieter Stoll u. a. (2010), Stiftung Staatstheater Nürnberg (ed.), Das neue Schauspielhaus Nürnberg: Vom "Ami-Kino" zum Ensemble-Theater (in German), Nürnberg: Henschel, ISBN 978-3-89487-674-6
- E. Weber (1905), Zur Einweihung des neuen Stadttheaters in Nürnberg am 1. September 1905 (in German), Nürnberg: Tümmels Verlag
