= Hans Gierster =

German conductor

Hans Gierster (12 January 1925 – 20 September 1995) was a German conductor.

== Life ==
=== Training and debut ===
Born in Munich, Gierster was a pupil of Clemens Krauss and worked from 1942 as répétiteur in Munich. He was engaged at the Düsseldorfer Opernhaus from 1945 to 1952. From 1952 to 1956 he was Kapellmeister at the Bayerische Staatsoper and conducted operas by Mozart, Verdi and Richard Strauss in the former temporary quarters of the Prinzregententheater. In 1956 he became Generalmusikdirektor at the Theater Freiburg. There he conducted Wagner's Der Ring des Nibelungen as well as Hindemith's operas Cardillac and Mathis der Maler, through which he became nationally known.

=== GMD at the Opernhaus Nürnberg ===
From autumn 1965 to summer 1988 he was general music director at the Staatstheater Nürnberg. He made his debut as Nuremberg GMD at the opening of the 1965/66 season with Fidelio. In the interim season of 1964/65 he had already been guest conductor of two productions before, Boris Godunov and Aida. After the death of the general director Karl Pschigode, Gierster also took over the opera direction at the Nuremberg Opera House from 1971 (until 1976) and received a lifetime contract as GMD.

In concert and opera, Gierster focused on composers such as Gustav Mahler (1977, Symphony No. 8), Anton Bruckner, Arnold Schoenberg, (1981, Gurrelieder together with the Nürnberger Symphoniker), Hans Werner Henze and Krzysztof Penderecki and conducted numerous premieres and first performances, including works by Boris Blacher, Werner Egk, Wilhelm Killmayer, György Ligeti, Aribert Reimann and Hans Zender. He enlarged the philharmonic orchestra to 87 musicians, increased rehearsal times, reduced the number of operettes in the repertoire, and for reasons of space moved the Philharmonic Concerts to the newly built Meistersingerhalle.

As an opera conductor he was especially committed to musical avant-garde. He conducted widely acclaimed performances of works such as Moses und Aron (Premiere: December 1970, director: Hans-Peter Lehmann), Zimmermann's Die Soldaten (Premiere: June 1974, director: Hans-Peter Lehmann), the double opera Träume by Isang Yun (Premiere: February 1969, director: Wolfgang Weber, stage: Peter Heyduck) and Luigi Nono's Intolleranza 70 (Premiere: May 1970).

With the Träume production, Gierster gave guest performances at the Wiener Festwochen, as well as in Berlin, Munich and Frankfurt; with Intollerenza 70 at the Maggio Musicale Fiorentino.

As opera director he engaged numerous acting directors to the Nuremberg opera house, among others Hans Neuenfels (1974 for Il trovatore), Hansgünther Heyme (season 1974/75 for Wozzeck, with Dunja Vejzovic as Marie), Hans Hollmann, Hansjörg Utzerath, Luca Ronconi, Alfred Kirchner and Peter Mussbach.

=== Retirement and death ===
His last Nuremberg opera premiere as GMD was Elektra in the 1986/87 season (premiere: May 1987). After this, Gierster withdrew from the GMD office for health reasons after he had prematurely terminated his contract in August 1988. He conducted his last concert in February 1989 in the Nuremberg Meistersingerhalle, Mahler's Symphony No. 1 with the Nuremberg Philharmony.

Gierster died at the age of 70 in a Straubing hospital to the consequences of a stroke. He is buried at the Nürnberger Johannisfriedhof.

== Bibliography ==
- Hans Bertram Bock: Ein Pionier der Avantgarde. Nachruf. In Nürnberger Nachrichten 21 September 1995. page 21.
- Staatstheater Nürnberg (publisher): Die Generalmusikdirektoren. In: 1905 Opernhaus – 2005 Staatstheater. Nürnberg 2005. p. 120/121. ISBN 3-924773-12-2.
