= Hans Deinzer =

German clarinetist (1934–2020)

- Born: 14 January 1934; Nuremberg, Germany
- Died: 26 February 2020 (aged 86)
- Occupations: Clarinetist; Academic teacher
- Years active: 1954–1996

Hans Deinzer (14 January 1934 – 26 February 2020) was a clarinetist and clarinet teacher who taught at the Hochschule für Musik und Theater, Hannover for thirty years, and retired in 1996.

== Biography ==
Born in Rothenbruck, Deinzer received his first clarinet lessons at the Städtisches Konservatoriun in Nuremberg between 1949 and 1955. He was until 1962 a student of Rudolf Gall in Munich.

Deinzer was clarinetist at the Nürnberger Symphoniker and at the Sinfonieorchester des Norddeutschen Rundfunks in Hamburg.

He was one of the first clarinetists to professionally adopt the use of rubber mouthpieces, and also was a champion of historical instruments and playing. He recorded two versions of the Mozart Clarinet Concerto using a reconstructed historical boxwood clarinet and has premiered several important works, including Pierre Boulez's Domaines —which was written for him— and Henri Pousseur's Madrigal I.

He is a two-time winner of the Grand Prix du Disque.

His students include several prominent clarinetists, such as Sabine Meyer, Reiner Wehle, Wolfgang Meyer, Martin Fröst, Andreas Sundén, Andrew Marriner, Nicholas Cox, Antonio Salguero and Michele Zukovsky.

== Discography ==
The track "Edition" features several of his students.

- Werner Heider; Dialog I for Clarinet and Piano; Colosseum Colos SM 552 (p) 1973
- Werner Heider; Inventio II for Solo Clarinet; Colosseum Colos SM 552 (p) 1973
- Werner Heider; Strophen for Clarinet and Chamber Orchestra; Colosseum Colos SM 552 (p) 1973
- Werner Heider; Edition for five Clarinets; Colosseum Colos SM 552 (p) 1973
- Werner Heider; Kunst-Stoff for Electric Clarinet, Prepared Piano and Tape; Colosseum Colos SM 552 (p) 1973
