= Werner Heider =

German composer, pianist and conductor

Werner Heider (born 1 January 1930) is a German composer, pianist and conductor.

== Life ==
Born in Fürth, Heider studied with Willy Spilling in Nuremberg and at the University of Music and Performing Arts Munich between 1945 and 1951. From 1949, he worked for the Bayerischer Rundfunk. Within his compositions, he has been exploring both, strict construction principles and the dialogue between contemporary music and jazz (Third Stream). He participated during the Colloquium musicale of Carla Henius in Rome;. As a pianist he formed, among others, the ensemble Confronto and a trio with Oliver Colbentson (violin) and Hans Deinzer (clarinet).

As a conductor, Heider appeared at the NDR Radiophilharmonie Hannover, the Bamberg Symphony, the Staatsphilharmonie Nürnberg and the Nuremberg Symphony, as well as the symphony orchestras of the Stuttgart Radio Symphony Orchestra, the Deutsche Radio Philharmonie Saarbrücken Kaiserslautern and the hr-Sinfonieorchester. In 1968 he formed the Ars Nova Ensemble (Nuremberg, Germany) in collaboration with Klaus Hashagen. Ars Nova has been dissolved by now.

Heider has supported endlessly fellow composers, including works by Minas Borboudakis, Horst Lohse, Karola Obermüller and Martin Smolka.

His own compositions have been performed by conductors such as Péter Eötvös, Michael Gielen, Bruno Maderna, Jun Märkl and Hans Zender.

== Students ==
- Walter Zimmermann (born 1949), composer, author and university lecturer.
