= Kurstin =

Kurstin is a surname. Notable people with the surname include:

- Greg Kurstin (born 1969), American songwriter and record producer
- Pamelia Kurstin (born 1976), American musician

== See also ==
- Kerstin
