= Kerstin Thieme =

German woman composer

Kerstin Thieme (23 June 1909, as Karl Thieme – 26 November 2001) was a German composer, composition teacher, music educator and music writer.

== Life and career ==
Thieme was born in Bad Schlema, Ore Mountains. After her Abitur at the Oberrealschule in Aue, she studied music education and composition at the University of Music and Theatre Leipzig with Hermann Grabner from 1929 to 1934. Her fellow students included Hugo Distler and Miklós Rózsa. In 1933, she successfully passed the Staatsexamen for teaching at secondary schools and received her doctorate in 1934 with a thesis on the topic of "Klangstil des Mozartorchesters". Her first teaching activities in Leipzig followed. From 1939 to 1945, Thieme was obliged to serve as a soldier on the front in the Second World War and later became a prisoner of war in Italy.

After her political escape from the Soviet occupation zone in 1948, she obtained a position as Studienrat at the Labenwolf-Oberrealschule in Nuremberg, an arts grammar school, from 1950 to 1951. From 1956 to 1960, she was a lecturer at the Hochschule für Musik Nürnberg, where she taught music theory. From 1960 to 1974, she was a lecturer in the Department of Music Education at the Friedrich-Alexander-Universität Erlangen-Nürnberg.

After her retirement in 1974, Thieme decided to undergo gender reassignment in 1976 at the age of 67 and adopted the female first name Kerstin.

Thieme lived as a woman until her death in 2001. She continued to work as a composer until 1989. She died at the age of 92 and was buried at the Ostfilderfriedhof in Sillenbuch Stuttgart.

== Work ==
Thieme already achieved her first compositional successes during her time in Leipzig. This included the world premiere of the Variations on a Theme by Hindemith for large orchestra at the Gewandhaus in 1934. After the Second World War, Thieme's compositional activities focused primarily on vocal music and orchestral works. In compositions with texts, the human solo voice often takes a back seat to the use of choirs. However, Thieme's works, which are often characterised by bold harmonies, are never lacking in songfulness and clarity of text.

Among Thieme's important works are Canticum Hoffnung, a triptych for soprano solo and mixed choir (1973) based on texts by Nelly Sachs and the Requiem, the premiere of which took place in Nuremberg in 1998. Thieme also wrote numerous works for premières as part of the International Organ Week Nuremberg (ION) in Nuremberg. Thieme maintained close ties with the choirs and choral associations based in Nuremberg, such as the Hans-Sachs-Chor Nürnberg and the Bachchor St. Lorenz Nürnberg which also premiered Thieme's compositions on several occasions. Thieme received several prizes for her compositions, including one in 1989 at the Fanny Mendelssohn Competition for Composition of the City of Unna. Thieme has been a juror at several music competitions.
