= Kerstin =

- Pronunciation: Swedish: /²ɕæʂtɪn/
- Gender: Female
- Language: German, Swedish

Other names
- Variant form: Christina

Kerstin is a female German and Swedish given name; it is the European version of Christina.

Notable persons with this name include:

== Arts and entertainment ==
- Kerstin Anderson (born 1994), American stage actress and singer, portrayed Maria von Trapp in the 2015 US national tour of The Sound of Music
- Kerstin Avemo (born 1973), Swedish operatic soprano
- Kerstin Ekman (born 1933), Swedish novelist
- Kerstin Emhoff (born 1967), American film producer
- Kerstin Granlund, member of the Swedish comedy groups Galenskaparna och After Shave
- Kerstin Hilldén (born 1988), Swedish musical theatre actress
- Kerstin Meyer, (1928–2020), Swedish operatic mezzo-soprano
- Kerstin Ott (born 1982), German musician
- Kerstin Thorborg (1896–1970), Swedish operatic mezzo-soprano
- Kerstin Thorvall (1925–2010), Swedish writer

== Politics ==
- Kerstin Alm (born 1949), Finnish politician from the Åland Islands
- Kerstin Andreae (born 1968), German politician (Alliance 90/The Greens)
- Kerstin Gellerman (1926–1987), Swedish politician

== Sports ==
- Kerstin Garefrekes (born 1979), German footballer
- Kerstin Gressmann (born 1994), Namibian tennis player
- Kerstin Müller (born 1969), German rower

== Other ==
- Kerstin Grebäck (born 1942), Swedish peace activist
- Kerstin Brummenbaum (born 1971), German Buddhist nun
- Kerstin Mey (born 1963), German academic, President of the University of Limerick, Ireland
- Kerstin Fritzl (born 1988), imprisoned alongside her mother

== See also ==
- Kerstin-Maria Aronsson (born 1937), Swedish politician
- Kerstin (horse), a Thoroughbred racehorse
- 842 Kerstin, minor planet orbiting the Sun
