= Aue-Bad Schlema =

- Town
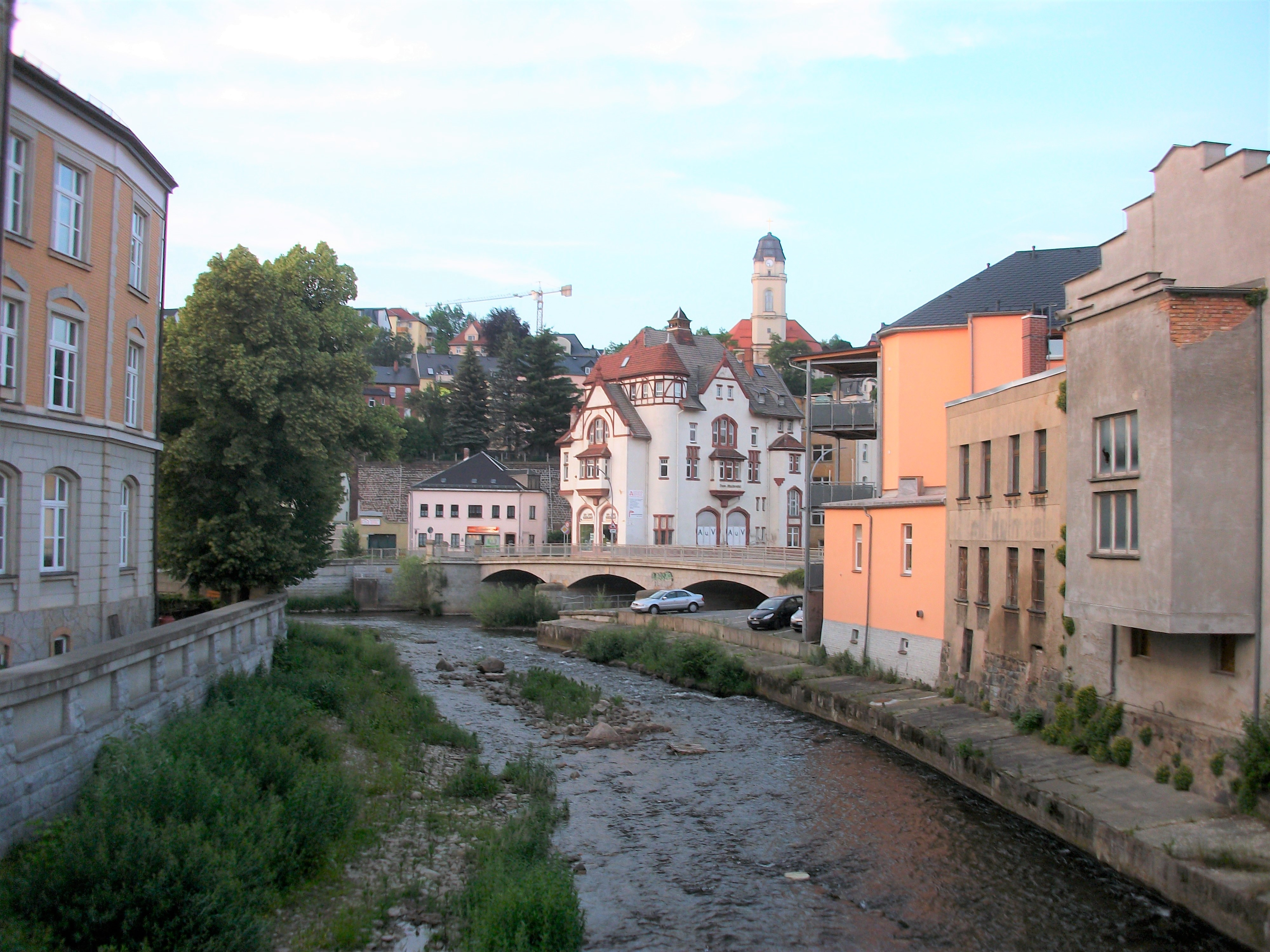
- Zwickauer Mulde in Aue with Friedenskirche in the background

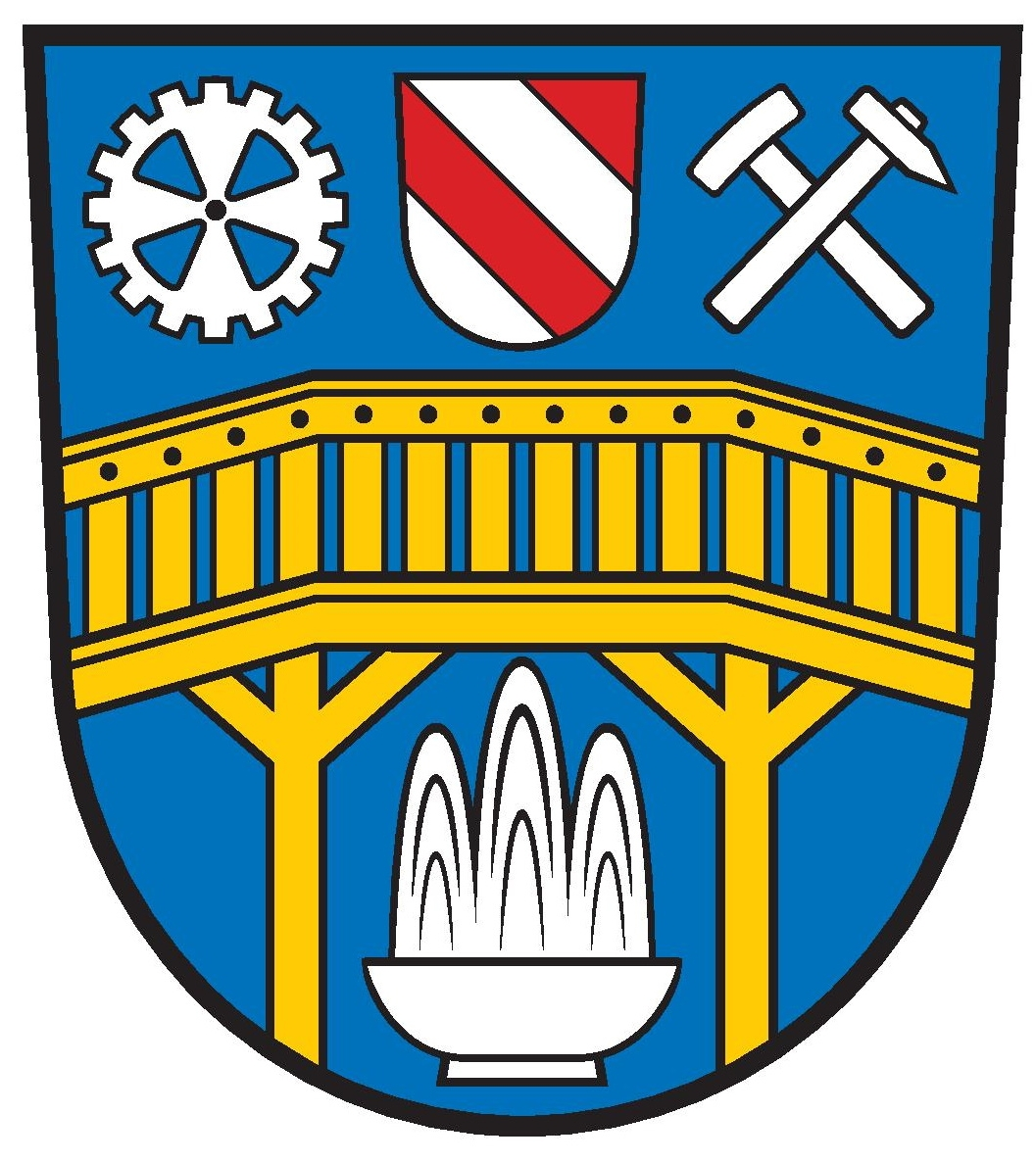
- Coat of arms

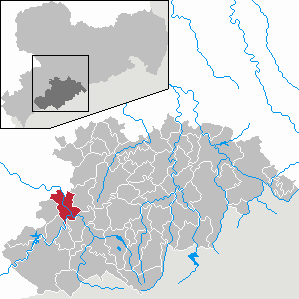
- Location of Aue-Bad Schlema within Erzgebirgskreis district
- Interactive map of Aue-Bad Schlema
- Location within Germany Location within Saxony
- Coordinates: 50°36′N 12°41′E
- Country: Germany
- State: Saxony
- District: Erzgebirgskreis
- Subdivisions: 4

Government
  - Mayor (2019–26): Heinrich Kohl (CDU)

Area
  - Total: 36.43 km^{2} (14.07 sq mi)
- Elevation: 360 m (1,180 ft)

Population (2025-12-31)
  - Total: 18,968
  - Density: 520.7/km^{2} (1,349/sq mi)
- Time zone: UTC+01:00 (CET)
  - Summer (DST): UTC+02:00 (CEST)
- Postal codes: 08280, 08301
- Dialling codes: 03771, 03772
- Vehicle registration: ERZ, ANA, ASZ, AU, MAB, MEK, STL, SZB, ZP
- Website: http://www.aue-badschlema.de/

Aue-Bad Schlema (German pronunciation: [ˈaʊ̯ə baːt ˈʃleːma]) is a town and a municipality in the Erzgebirgskreis, in Saxony, Germany. It was created with effect from 1 January 2019 by the merger of the former municipalities of Aue and Bad Schlema.

== Twin towns – sister cities ==
Aue-Bad Schlema is twinned with:

- Solingen, Germany (1990)
- Kadaň, Czech Republic (2003)
- Guingamp, France (2011)
