= Bad Schlema =

Town in Saxony, Germany

- Stadtteil of Aue-Bad Schlema
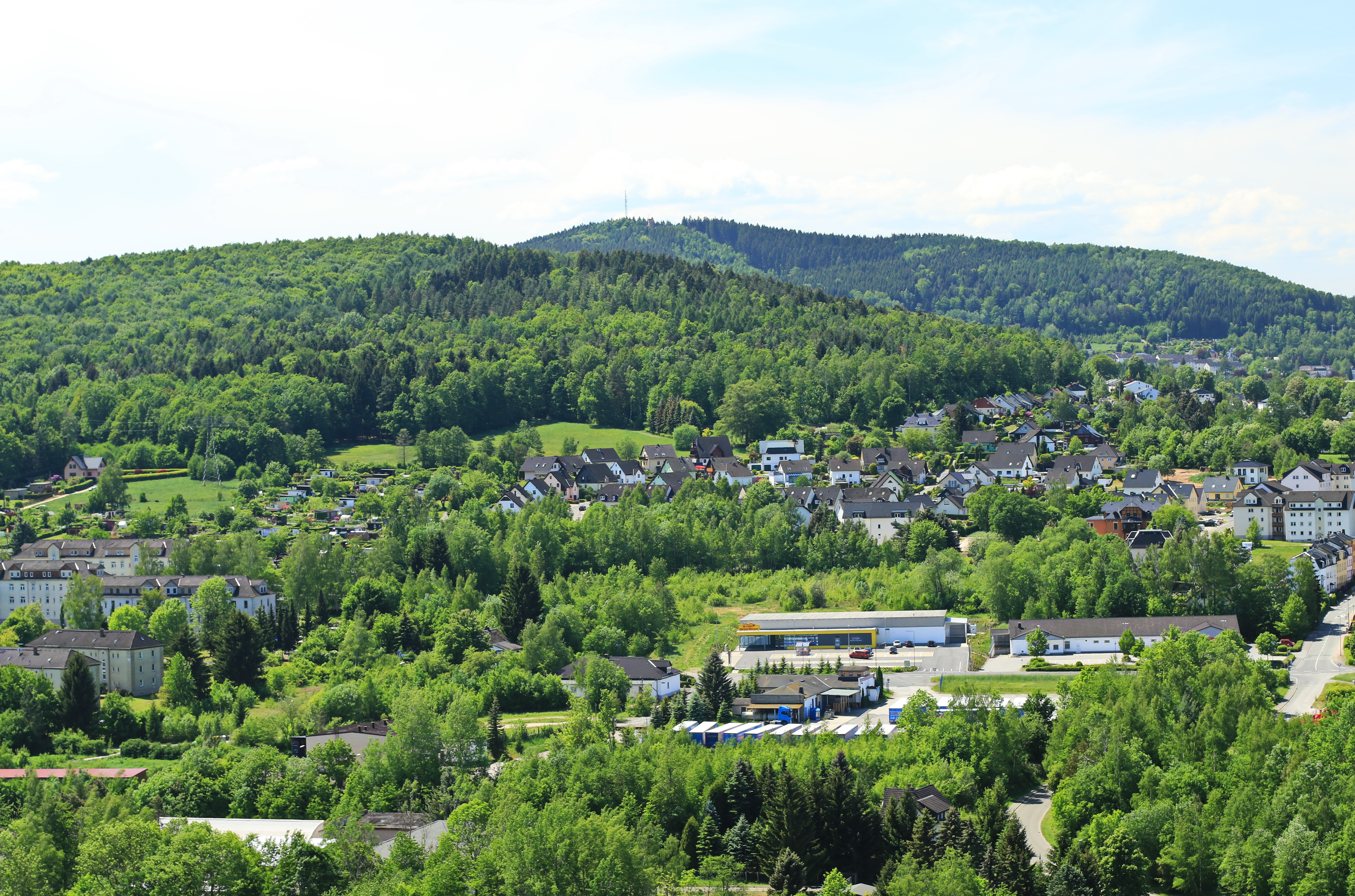

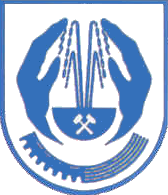
- Coat of arms
- Interactive map of Bad Schlema
- Location within Germany Location within Saxony
- Coordinates: 50°37′N 12°40′E
- Country: Germany
- State: Saxony
- District: Erzgebirgskreis
- Town: Aue-Bad Schlema

Area
  - Total: 15.51 km^{2} (5.99 sq mi)
- Elevation: 357 m (1,171 ft)

Population (2017-12-31)
  - Total: 4,777
  - Density: 308.0/km^{2} (797.7/sq mi)
- Time zone: UTC+01:00 (CET)
  - Summer (DST): UTC+02:00 (CEST)
- Postal codes: 08301
- Dialling codes: 03772
- Vehicle registration: ERZ
- Website: www.kurort-schlema.de

Bad Schlema (German pronunciation: [baːt ˈʃleːma]) is a community in the district of Erzgebirgskreis in Saxony in Germany. It was merged into the new town Aue-Bad Schlema in January 2019. It belongs to the Silberberg Town League (Städtebund Silberberg). The Silver Road (Silberstraße) runs through the town. The community is developing its tourist industry, above all its spa facilities.

== Geography ==
Bad Schlema's constituent communities are Oberschlema, Niederschlema and Wildbach.

== History ==
Today's community of Bad Schlema is an amalgamation of the two formerly separate communities of Niederschlema and Oberschlema, which took place in 1958. Since 1994, the community of Wildbach has also been united with this newer community.

Both these roughly 800-year-old communities in the Schlema Valley became well known through the centuries for iron, copper, silver and uranium mining. At the time of industrialization, the Toelle, Ehrler, Leonhardt, Rostosky and Philipp factories in Niederschlema and the Wilisch, Leonhardt, Kenzler and Müller companies in Oberschlema were household names throughout Germany. After a means of manufacturing blue dye from cobalt was discovered by Christoph Schürer, there developed in Oberschlema the world's biggest cobalt-blue dyeworks, with 42 buildings. After rich radon springs were opened up in the Marx-Semmler-Stolln (a hillside mine) in Oberschlema between 1908 and 1912, the world's richest radium spa developed after 1918. Only 10 years later, it was counted among Germany's most important spas (in 1943, there were more than 17,000 spa visitors).

Once the uranium mining was taken over by the Soviet occupation forces, the spa, the Radiumbad Oberschlema Hotel, and the downtown of Oberschlema were utterly obliterated. By 1990, the Soviet-German Wismut Corporation (Sowjetisch-Deutsche Aktiengesellschaft Wismut, or SDAG Wismut) had mined more than 80 000 t of uranium from the Schlema Valley and the neighbouring Mulde Valley.

From 1952 until 1990, Schlema was part of the Bezirk Karl-Marx-Stadt of East Germany.

After mining came to an end, the mayor, Konrad Barth, organized Schlema's revival as a spa town, which was realized in 1998 when the new Kurhaus (“spa house”) was opened. The newly opened radon springs afford ample bathing, now daily used by 1,200 guests at the "Actinon" bathhouse.

On 18 January 2005, Saxony's state government bestowed upon the community the official designation Bad (literally “Bath”), after it had already been recognized as a radon spa since 29 October 2004. Bad Schlema thus became the first community to receive the Bad designation since 1990.

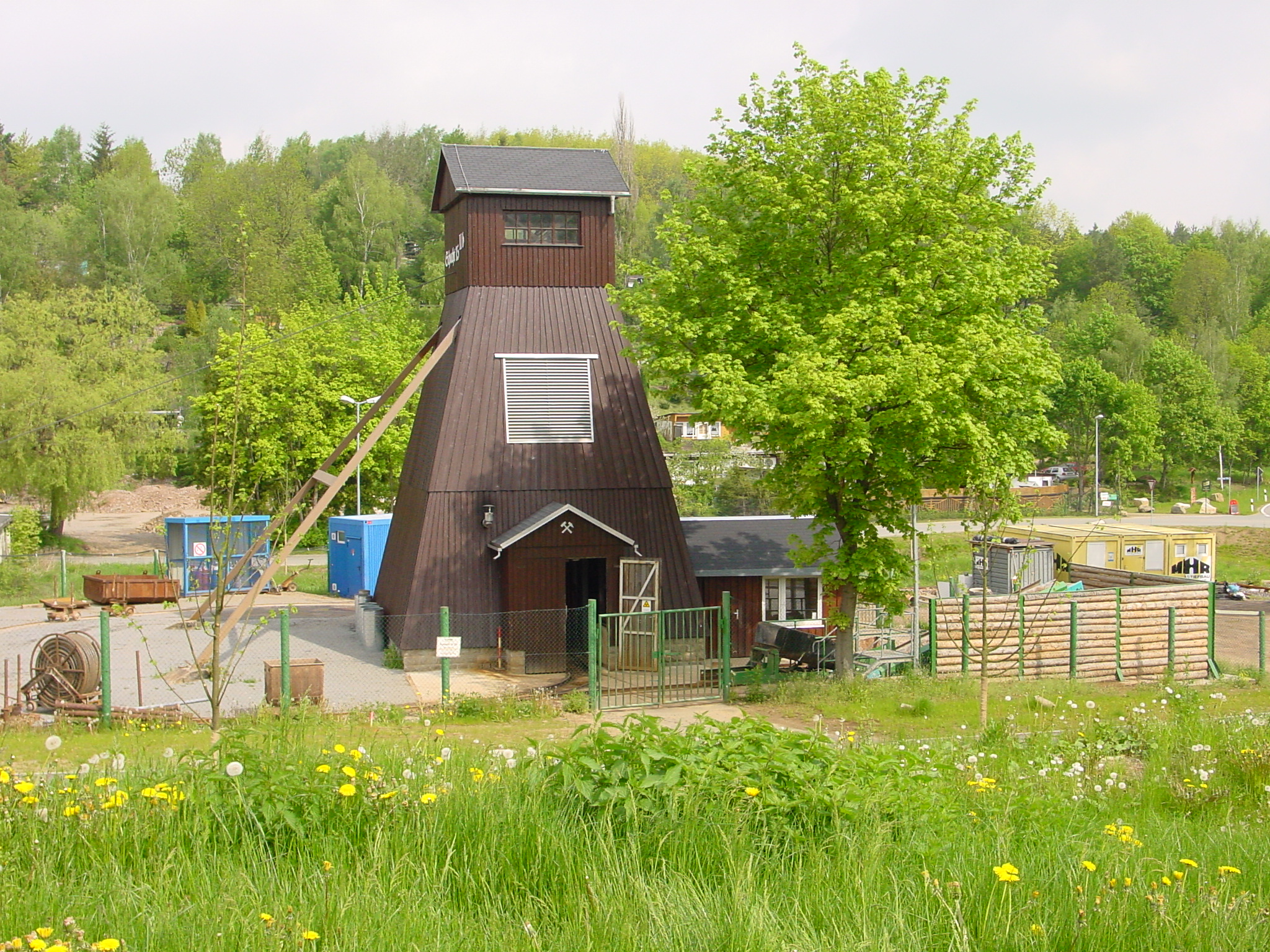
Markus-Semmler-Stollen visitor mine

In 2016, the Mayor of Bad Schlema advised the citizens to have their daughters "don’t walk in these areas," referring to streets where underage girls may be harassed in Bad Schlema by illegal migrants.

=== Population development ===
All following figures are for 31 December in the given year.

1982 to 1988

- 1982 − 7921
- 1983 − 7779
- 1984 − 7617
- 1985 − 7568
- 1986 − 7466
- 1987 − 7428
- 1988 − 7309

1989 to 1995

- 1989 − 6959
- 1990 − 6605
- 1991 − 6460
- 1992 − 6365
- 1993 − 6343
- 1994 − 6340
- 1995 − 6234

1996 to 2002

- 1996 − 6189
- 1997 − 6249
- 1998 − 6227
- 1999 − 6088
- 2000 − 5849
- 2001 − 5737
- 2002 − 5649

2003 to 2006

- 2003 − 5595
- 2004 − 5549
- 2005 − 5493
- 2006 − 5451

Source: Statistisches Landesamt des Freistaates Sachsen

== Politics ==
=== Municipal partnership ===
Bad Schlema maintains a partnership with Rechberghausen in Baden-Württemberg.

== Culture and sightseeing ==
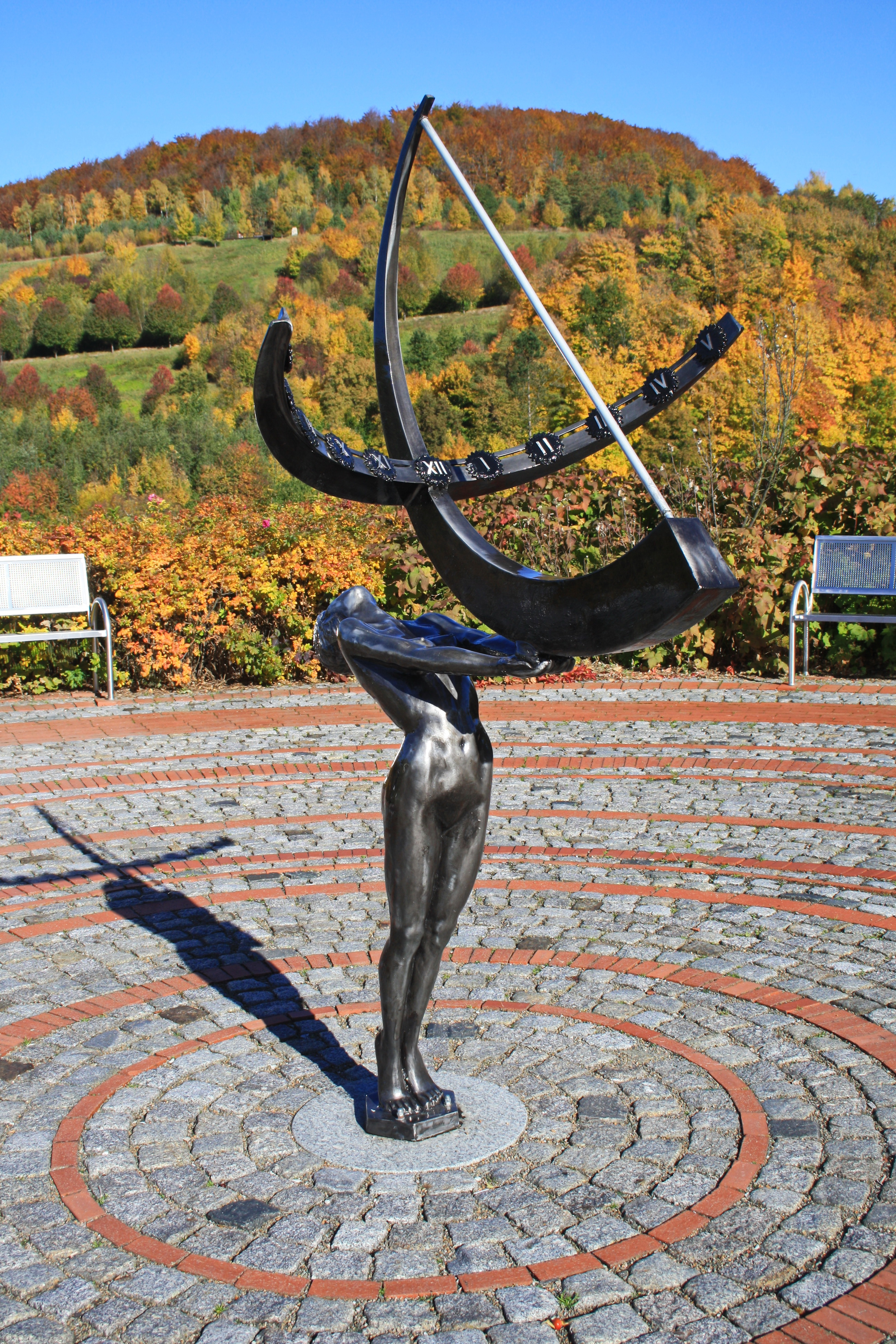
Sculpture and sundial in park

=== Museums ===
- Traditionsstätte des Sächsisch-Thüringischen Uranerzbergbaus (Saxon-Thuringian Historic Site for Uranium Mining)

=== Music ===
- Silberbach-Chor (choir)

== Notable local people ==
- Kerstin Thieme (1909–2001), composer
- Ricco Groß (born 1970), biathlete
- Michael Leutert (born 1974), politician (The Linke)
