= Joana Mallwitz =

German conductor and pianist

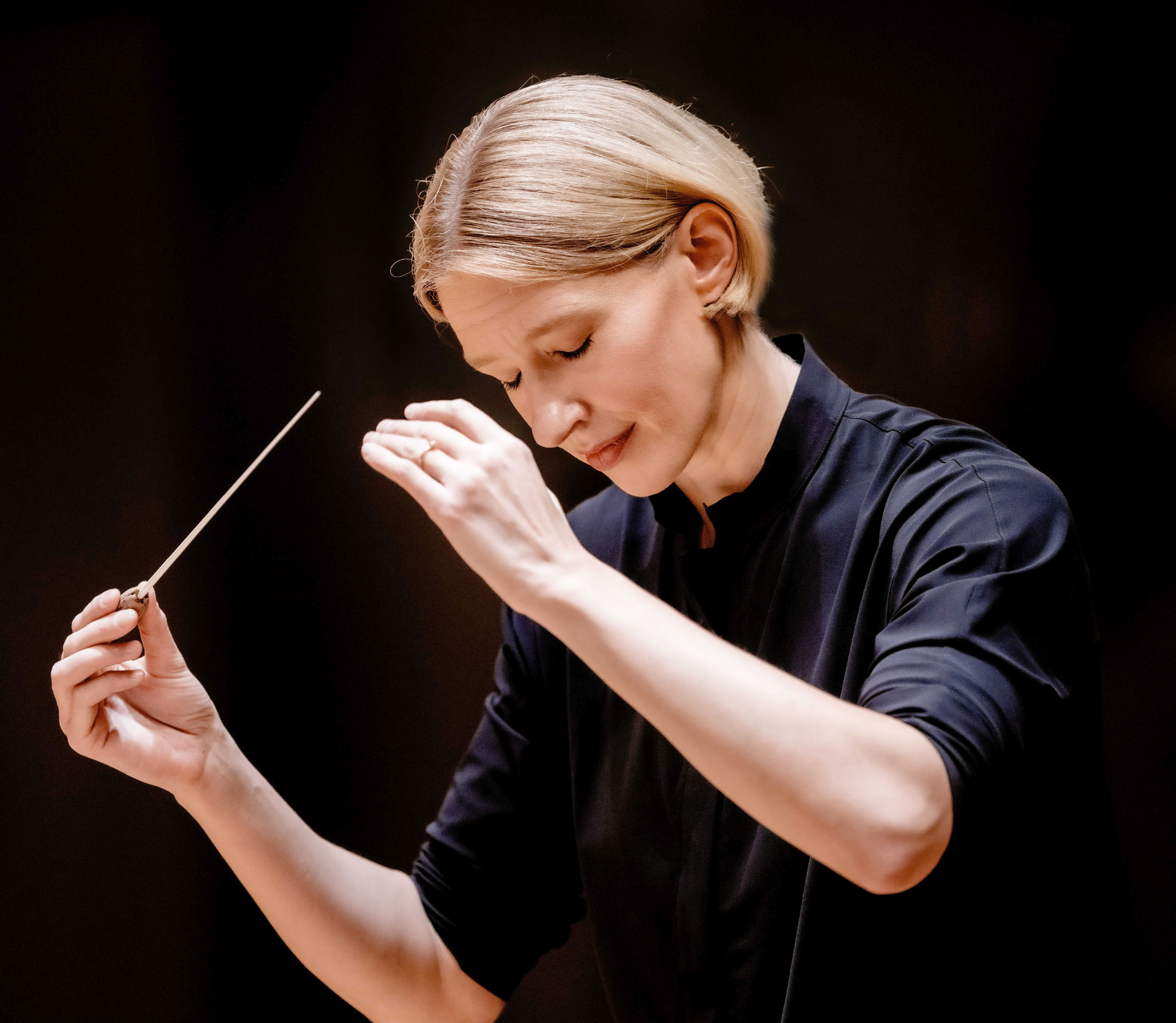
- Mallwitz conducting
- Born: 23 September 1986; Hildesheim, Lower Saxony, Germany
- Education: Hochschule für Musik und Theater Hannover
- Occupations: Conductor; Pianist
- Organizations: Theater Erfurt; Staatstheater Nürnberg; Konzerthausorchester Berlin
- Awards: Order of Merit of the Federal Republic of Germany

Joana Mallwitz (born 23 September 1986) is a German conductor and pianist. She is the principal conductor of the Konzerthausorchester Berlin.

== Biography ==
Born in Hildesheim in 1986, Mallwitz began to study violin at age 3, and piano at age 5. As a young child, her parents banned her from touching the piano for three hours each afternoon to play in the garden. At age 14, she became a pupil of Christa-Maria Hartmann and Karl-Heinz Kämmerling. She continued her music studies at the Hochschule für Musik und Theater Hannover, where her teachers included Martin Brauss and Eiji Ōue, in conducting, and she continued piano studies with Kämmerling and with Bernd Goetzke. In 2004, she received a conducting scholarship from the Studienstiftung des deutschen Volkes.

In 2006, Mallwitz joined the conducting staff of the Theater und Orchester Heidelberg, at the invitation of then-GMD Cornelius Meister, as a repetiteur. During her third month of work in Heidelberg, she made her debut professional conducting appearance there, at 6 hours' notice, at the first night of the company's new production of Madama Butterfly. From 2007 to 2011, she worked in Heidelberg as Zweite Kapellmeisterin (Second Kapellmeister) and assistant to the GMD. In 2009, she was a recipient of the Praetorius Musik-Förderpreis.

In July 2013, Mallwitz was named Generalmusikdirektorin (General Music Director; GMD) of the Theater Erfurt, the first woman conductor named to the post in the institution's history. She formally took up the post with the 2014–2015 season, at the time, the youngest GMD of a German opera house. She concluded her Erfurt tenure at the close of the 2017–2018 season.

In October 2017, the Staatstheater Nürnberg announced the appointment of Mallwitz as its new GMD, effective with the 2018–2019 season. She was the first female conductor to be named to the Nürnberg post. Her work in Nürnberg included the establishment of an Expeditionskonzert series for introduction of orchestral works to audiences. In August 2020, Mallwitz made her debut at the Salzburg Festival with Così fan tutte, the third female conductor ever to conduct an opera production at the Salzburg Festival, and the first female conductor directly scheduled in advance by the Salzburg Festival for an opera production. Mallwitz stood down as GMD of the Staatstheater Nürnberg at the close of the 2022–2023 season. In April 2024, the Staatsphilharmonie Nürnberg, the orchestra of the Staatstheater Nürnberg, named Mallwitz its Ehrendirigentin (honorary conductor), the first conductor granted this title in the history of the orchestra.

Mallwitz first guest-conducted the Konzerthausorchester Berlin during the 2020–2021 season. In August 2021, the orchestra announced the appointment of Mallwitz as its next chief conductor and artistic director, effective with the 2023–2024 season, with an initial contract of five seasons. Mallwitz is the first female conductor to be named chief conductor of the Konzerthausorchester Berlin, and the first female conductor to be named chief conductor of any Berlin orchestra. In July 2026, the Konzerthausorchester Berlin announced the extension of her contract as chief conductor and artistic director through the 2032–2033 season.

Mallwitz is married to the German tenor Simon Bode, who is an ensemble member of the Oper Frankfurt. In 2019, Opernwelt magazine voted Mallwitz its Dirigentin des Jahres ('Conductor of the Year'). In November 2020, Mallwitz received the Sonderpreis (Special Prize) of the Bavarian Culture Prize. Mallwitz and Bode had their first child in 2021. Mallwitz is featured as conductor on a commercial recording for Oehms Classics and on a DVD for Deutsche Grammophon of the 2020 Salzburg Festival production of Così fan tutte. She made her Metropolitan Opera debut in 2025 in The Marriage of Figaro.

== Awards ==
- 2023 Order of Merit of the Federal Republic of Germany

Cultural offices
Preceded by Walter E. Gugerbauer	General Music Director, Theater Erfurt; 2014–2018	Succeeded by Myron Michailidis
Preceded by Marcus Bosch	General Music Director, Staatstheater Nürnberg; 2018–2023	Succeeded by Roland Böer
Preceded by Christoph Eschenbach	Principal Conductor, Konzerthausorchester Berlin; 2023–present	Succeeded by incumbent
