= Cantiere Internazionale d'Arte =

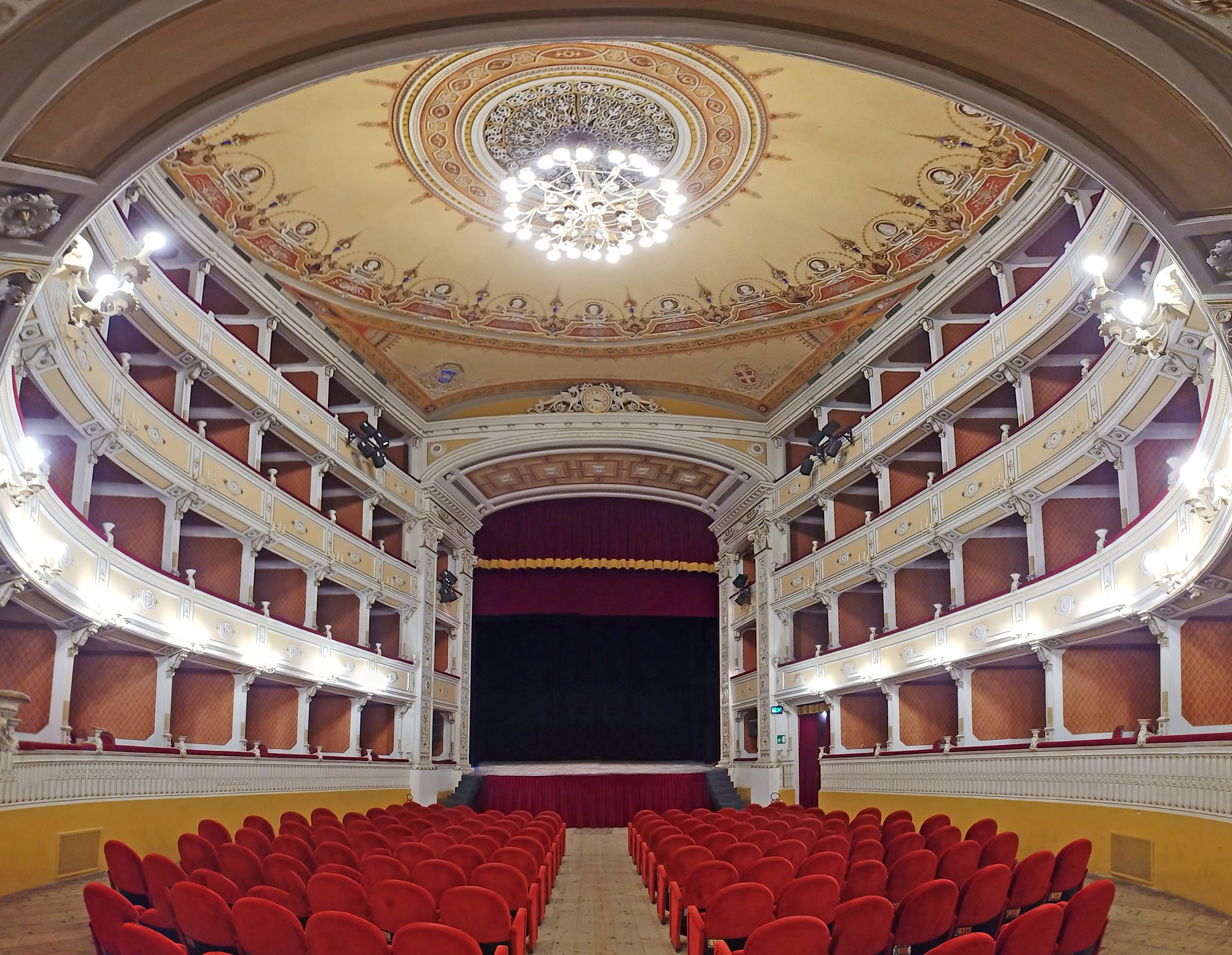
- Interior of the Teatro Poliziano
- Genre: mostly music
- Frequency: annually in summer
- Locations: Montepulciano, Tuscany, Italy
- Inaugurated: 1976; 50 years ago
- People: Hans Werner Henze; Roland Böer; Vincent Monteil
- Website: www.fondazionecantiere.it

The Cantiere Internazionale d'Arte (International Art Workshop) is an annual international summer school and musical festival for young singers, actors, musicians, conductors and composers. It was set up in Montepulciano, Italy, in 1976 by Hans Werner Henze. Several works received their world premieres at the festival.

== History ==
Hans Werner Henze founded the Cantiere Internazionale d'Arte in Montepulciano, Tuscany, in 1976. Productions of concerts and theatre are prepared in the summer school and then played at the festival. Participants do not receive fees, but food and accommodation. Among the venues is the historic Teatro Poliziano.

Since November 2005 the workshop has been organised by the Fondazione Cantiere Internazionale d'Arte di Montepulciano, run by the town, and by the Province of Siena. Roland Böer became musical director in 2009, and was artistic director from 2015 to 2020. Vincent Monteil followed as the artistic director.
