= Karl Pschigode =

German actor and theater manager

Karl Pschigode (28 April 1907 in Düsseldorf – 22 July 1971 in Munich) was a German actor and theater manager.

Pschigode came to Nuremberg in 1942 as an actor. In 1947, he took over the direction of the Städtische Bühnen Nürnberg (today Staatstheater Nürnberg) as artistic director, and from 1953 as general director. He remained in office until 1970.
