= Kerstin Hilldén =

Swedish musical theatre actress

- Born: Kerstin Elizabeth Hilldén; 22 June 1989 (age 36); Mölndal, Sweden
- Occupation: Musical theatre actresses
- Years active: 2016–present
- Employer(s): Malmö Opera (2022–present) (2017–2020); Gothenburg Opera (2020–2021); Wermland Opera (2016–2017); Länsteatern in Gotland (2016)

Kerstin Elizabeth Hilldén (Swedish pronunciation: [ɕæʂtɪn hɪldeːn]; born 22 June 1989) is a Swedish singer and actress.

== Early life and education ==
Kerstin Elizabeth Hilldén was born at Mölndal Hospital in Mölndal on 22 June 1989. While growing up, Hilldén would perform on stage at the Gothenburg Opera.

In 2011, Hilldén attended Wendelsbergs folkhögskola, later, in 2014, studying at Balettakademien in Gothenburg. In 2015, Hilldén was accepted into the Royal Academy of Music in London.

== Career ==
Hilldén's first musical was the adaptation of Victor Hugo's Les Misérables, which was played in Swedish at the Wermland Opera in 2016. Hilldén played the role of Eponine which she described as "one of [her] favourite characters along with Javert and Valjean". She further stated that Eponine was a character with "which [she] could identify [herself] with".

Hilldén has played major roles in other musicals such as Sophia in Sound of Music, Miss Honey in the musical adaptation of Roald Dahl's novel Matilda, and Cabaret based on the 1966 musical of the same name. Sound of Music and Matilda were both played at the Malmö Opera, however Cabaret debuted on 2 October 2022 at the Gothenburg Opera. While still working at the Malmö Opera she played minor roles such as Bex and Natalie Goodman in the Swedish versions of Everybody's Talking About Jamie and Next to Normal, respectively.

Hilldén has also played minor parts/roles in several other musicals such as Festkväll (English: Party Night) at the Gothenburg Opera, A Talent to Amuse at St. James Theatre, and Curtain Up! Prince of Wales Theatre.

In 2020, she was part of a group of members of the Gothenburg Opera to participate and performed at Lotta på Liseberg.
