= Rolf Agop =

German conductor and academic

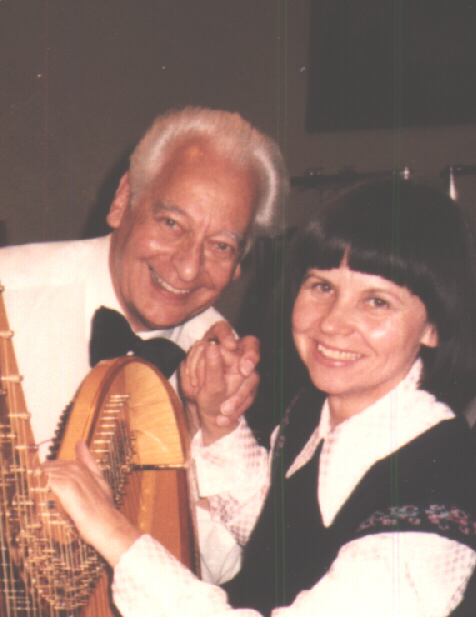
- The conductor with a harpist in 1990
- Born: 11 June 1908; Munich
- Died: 5 October 1988 (aged 80); Hilchenbach
- Occupations: Conductor; Academic teacher
- Organizations: Hochschule für Musik Detmold; Nordwestdeutsche Philharmonie
- Awards: Order of Merit of the Federal Republic of Germany

Rolf Agop (11 June 1908 – 15 October 1998) was a German conductor and academic teacher of Armenian descent.

== Career ==
Born in Munich where he studied, Agop worked first for the Bayerische Landesbühne, a touring theatre, and then for three years as Kapellmeister and choir director at the Kärntner Grenzland-Theater in Klagenfurt. From 1945 to 1948 he was Kapellmeister at the Nürnberg Opera.

In 1949 Agop taught conducting at the Hochschule für Musik Detmold. From 1950 to 1952 he was the first principal conductor of the newly formed Nordwestdeutsche Philharmonie. He then was Generalmusikdirektor of the Dortmunder Philharmoniker. From 1962 to 1964 he conducted the Malmö Symphony Orchestra, and from 1962 to 1976 the Siegerlandorchester, later called Philharmonie Südwestfalen. He died in Hilchenbach.
