= 842 Kerstin =

Dark background asteroid

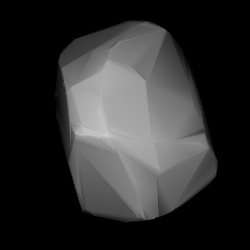
- Modelled shape of Kerstin from its lightcurve

Discovery
- Discovered by: M. F. Wolf
- Discovery site: Heidelberg Obs.
- Discovery date: 1 October 1916

Designations
- Pronunciation: German: [ˈkɛʁstiːn]
- Named after: unknown
- Alternative designations: A916 TB · 1916 AM
- Minor planet category: main-belt · (outer); background

Orbital characteristics
- Epoch 31 May 2020 (JD 2459000.5)
- Uncertainty parameter 0
- Observation arc: 103.12 yr (37,664 d)
- Aphelion: 3.6139 AU
- Perihelion: 2.8597 AU
- Semi-major axis: 3.2368 AU
- Eccentricity: 0.1165
- Orbital period (sidereal): 5.82 yr (2,127 d)
- Mean anomaly: 350.44°
- Mean motion: 0° 10^{m} 9.48^{s} / day
- Inclination: 14.496°
- Longitude of ascending node: 5.4008°
- Argument of perihelion: 352.49°

Physical characteristics
- Mean diameter: 39.16±2.8 km; 41.21±1.40 km; 43.576±0.190 km
- Synodic rotation period: 18.716±0.002 h
- Pole ecliptic latitude: (18.0°, 78.0°) (λ_{1}/β_{1})
- Geometric albedo: 0.041±0.009; 0.050±0.004; 0.0552±0.009
- Spectral type: C (assumed)
- Absolute magnitude (H): 10.6; 10.7

842 Kerstin (prov. designation: A916 TB or 1916 AM) is a dark background asteroid from the outer regions of the asteroid belt. It was discovered on 1 October 1916, by German astronomer Max Wolf at the Heidelberg-Königstuhl State Observatory in southwest Germany. The assumed C-type asteroid has a rotation period of 18.7 hours and measures approximately 41 kilometers (25 miles) in diameter. Any reference of the origin of the asteroid's name is unknown.

== Orbit and classification ==
Kerstin is a non-family asteroid of the main belt's background population when applying the hierarchical clustering method to its proper orbital elements. It orbits the Sun in the outer main-belt at a distance of 2.9–3.6 AU once every 5 years and 10 months (2,127 days; semi-major axis of 3.24 AU). Its orbit has an eccentricity of 0.12 and an inclination of 14° with respect to the ecliptic. The body's observation arc begins at Heidelberg Observatory with its official discovery observation on 1 October 1916.

== Naming ==
"Kerstin" is a German feminine first name. Any reference of this name to a person or occurrence is unknown.

=== Unknown meaning ===
Among the many thousands of named minor planets, Kerstin is one of 120 asteroids for which no official naming citation has been published. All of these asteroids have low numbers between 164 Eva and 1514 Ricouxa and were discovered between 1876 and the 1930s, predominantly by astronomers Auguste Charlois, Johann Palisa, Max Wolf and Karl Reinmuth.

== Physical characteristics ==
Kerstin is an assumed C-type asteroid, with a low astronomical albedo (see below) comparable to fresh asphalt.

=== Rotation period ===
In 2018, Czech astronomers Josef Ďurech and Josef Hanuš published a modeled lightcurve using photometric data from the Gaia spacecraft's second data release. It showed a sidereal period of 18.716±0.002 hours (U=2), and gave a spin axis at (18.0°, 78.0°) in ecliptic coordinates (λ, β).

=== Diameter and albedo ===
According to the surveys carried out by the Infrared Astronomical Satellite IRAS, the Japanese Akari satellite, and the NEOWISE mission of NASA's Wide-field Infrared Survey Explorer (WISE), Kerstin measures (39.16±2.8), (41.21±1.40) and (43.576±0.190) kilometers in diameter and its surface has an albedo of (0.0552±0.009), (0.050±0.004) and (0.041±0.009), respectively. The Collaborative Asteroid Lightcurve Link assumes a standard albedo for a carbonaceous asteroid of 0.057 and calculates a diameter of 42.23 kilometers based on an absolute magnitude of 10.6. Alternative mean-diameter measurements published by the WISE team include (36.87±11.73 km), (38.53±14.48 km), (44.602±0.680 km) and (45.536±0.186 km) with corresponding albedos of (0.06±0.04), (0.06±0.07), (0.051±0.005) and (0.0408±0.0082).
