= Kurt Marti =

Swiss theologian and poet

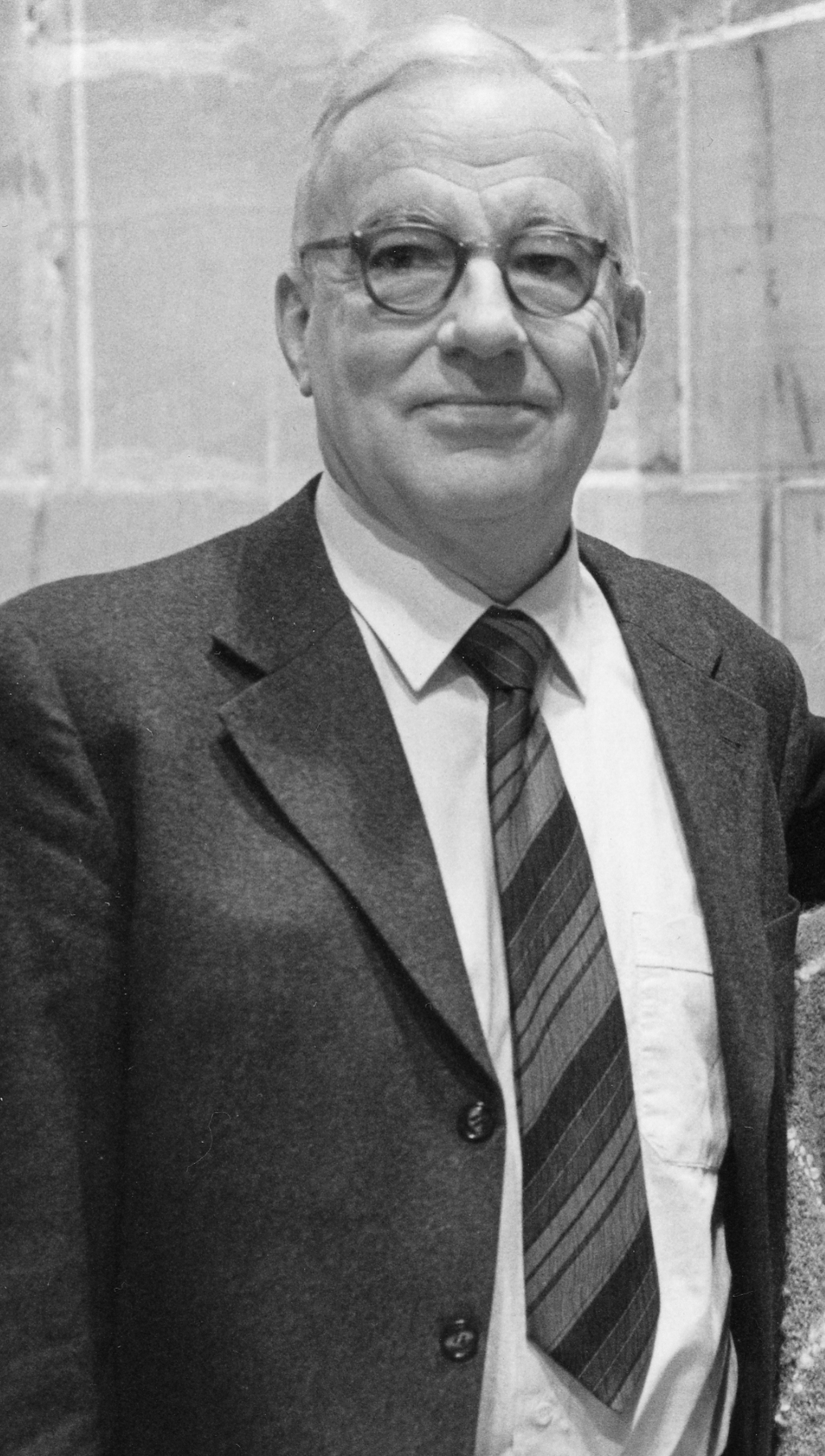
- Marti in 1989
- Born: 31 January 1921; Bern, Switzerland
- Died: 11 February 2017 (aged 96)
- Occupation: Poet

Kurt Marti (31 January 1921 – Bern, 11 February 2017) was a Swiss theologian and poet. His poetry often has theological and religious aspects to it. He is also known for dialect literature said to have intellectual quality.

Marti attended the Freie Gymnasium in Bern together with Friedrich Dürrenmatt. He then completed two semesters at the law faculty of the University of Bern before deciding to study Protestant theology.

From 1961 to 1983, he was pastor at the Nydeggkirche in Bern. He was involved in the fight against nuclear weapons, nuclear power plants, the U.S. intervention in Vietnam and was a co-founder of the development policy organization Berne Declaration and the dissident writers' group Olten, which was dissolved in 2002. After Karl Barth, Dorothee Sölle, whom he had known since the 1960s, had inspired him most theologically.

In 1972, for political reasons, the government council of the canton of Bern refused him a professorship in homiletics at the Protestant theological faculty of the University of Bern, where he had been nominated for election. In 1977, the same university awarded him an honorary doctorate. Since 1983, he worked as a freelance writer. In 2007 his wife Hanni Marti-Morgenthaler died.

In his sermons, essays, poems, and aphorisms, Marti proved to be an engaged and critical man of letters. Some of his texts were set to music.
