= Helmut Preißler =

German writer and poet (1925–2010)

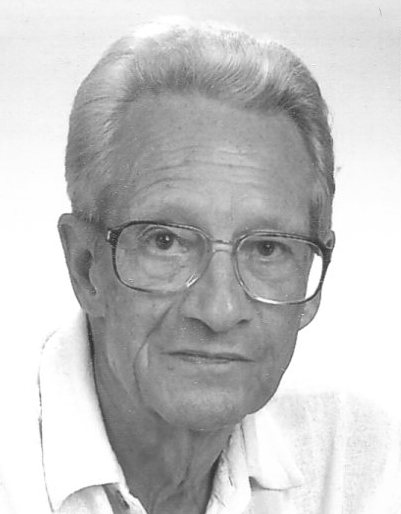
- Helmut Preissler (2009)
- Born: 16 December 1925; Cottbus, Brandenburg, Germany
- Died: 20 December 2010 (aged 85); Bad Saarow, Brandenburg, Germany
- Occupations: Writer poet
- Political party: SED

Helmut Preißler (16 December 1925, in Cottbus – 20 December 2010, in Bad Saarow) was a German writer and poet.

== Life ==
Preißler was born in Cottbus. His father was a weaver and his mother worked in the garment industry. On leaving school he began an apprenticeship in road construction, water management and civil engineering. The war having broken out when he was 13, he became a soldier towards the end of the conflict and ended up as a prisoner of war in Belgium between 1945 and 1947. During 1948 he was put to work on the demining of the River Rhine. He was then among those enrolled on an accelerated teacher training course implemented by the occupying forces in order to address the desperate shortage of teachers without Nazi backgrounds that Germany faced following the slaughter of the war, and until 1955 was employed as a school teacher in Cottbus till 1955. In 1955 he enrolled as a student at the Johannes R. Becher Institute for Literature (as it was then called) where he also undertook work as a teaching assistant.

From 1958 till 1965 he was employed at the Eisenhüttenstadt steel works as a Cultural Official by the country's Trades Union Federation (FDGB / Freier Deutscher Gewerkschaftsbund). In 1965 he obtained a job at the Kleist-Theater in Frankfurt, again as a Cultural Official, retaining this position till 1981, and between 1982 and 1987 he worked for the Frankfurt council in a similar capacity. After 1987 his principal career was as a free-lance writer.

Between 1957 and 1989 he also found time to publish at least one novel or book of poetry per year, becoming one of East Germany's most productive writers in terms of the sheer quantity of his published output. In addition he produced children's books and undertook work for radio and theatre. He also worked between 1966 and 1975 as Poetry Editor of Neue Deutsche Literatur (NDL) which was one of the country's two most important literary newspapers.

== Politics ==
Helmut Preißler was listed in the Stasi files as an Informal collaborator (IM) from 1960, identified as "IM Anton".

Preißler was a convinced supporter of the country's ruling Socialist Unity Party of Germany (SED / Sozialistische Einheitspartei Deutschlands), joining the Frankfurt regional council as an SED member in 1974. After 1961 he defended the erection of the Berlin Wall, for instance in his poem entitled "No one comes through, comrades" ("Keiner kommt durch, Genossen").

== Awards and prizes ==
- 1960: Arts Prize of the Free German Youth
- 1966: Heinrich Heine Prize from the East German Culture Ministry
- 1971: National Prize of East Germany
- 1974: Patriotic Order of Merit
