= Philippe Auguin =

French conductor (born 1961)

Philippe Auguin (born 19 February 1961, Nice, France) is a French conductor.

Auguin studied conducting at the University of Music and Performing Arts Vienna. He also studied conducting with Franco Ferrara. He served as an assistant conductor to Herbert von Karajan, until Karajan's death in July 1989 during rehearsals of Un Ballo in Maschera at the Salzburg Festival. He subsequently served as an assistant conductor to Sir Georg Solti. In 2005, Auguin conducted the first complete cycle of Der Ring des Nibelungen to China at the International Beijing Music Festival, with the Staatstheater Nürnberg.

Auguin was music director of the Orchestre Philharmonique de Nice from 2010 to 2016. Auguin first conducted at Washington National Opera in 2009, as an emergency substitute for the company's then-music director, Heinz Fricke. In October 2010, the company appointed Auguin as its music director, with immediate effect. He held the post through the 2017–2018 season, and took the title of music director emeritus upon his departure from the company.

Auguin was made an Honorary Consul of the French Republic in 2002. In 2005, he received the Federal Cross of Merit of the German Republic for his contributions to German culture.

In other media, Auguin recorded with the Vienna Philharmonic several opera sequences used in the film Mission: Impossible – Rogue Nation.

Cultural offices
Preceded by Marco Guidarini	Music Director, Orchestre Philharmonique de Nice; 2010-2016	Succeeded by György G. Ráth
Preceded by Heinz Fricke	Music Director, Washington National Opera; 2010-2018	Succeeded by Evan Rogister (principal conductor)
