= Eva Zeller =

German writer (1923–2022)

Eva Zeller (25 January 1923 – 5 September 2022) was a German poet and novelist.

Zeller was born in Eberswalde, Province of Brandenburg on 25 January 1923. She lived in the former East Germany until 1956, then lived for six years in Namibia, before returning to Germany.

Zeller was also credited as one of the authors of the text on the 1970 experimental music album, Klopfzeichen, by the Berlin-based trio Kluster. She died on 5 September 2022, at the age of 99.

== Publications ==
Novels

- Lampenfieber (Stage Fright) (1974)
- Hauptfrau (The Head Woman) (1977)
- Solange ich denken kann. Roman einer Jugend (As Long as I can Think. Novel of a Childhood) (1981)
- Das versiegelte Manuskript 1998 English translation: The Manuscript 2000

Poetry

- Fliehkraft (The Strength to Flee) (1975)
- Auf dem Wasser gehen (Walking on Water) (1979)
