= Roland Böer =

German conductor

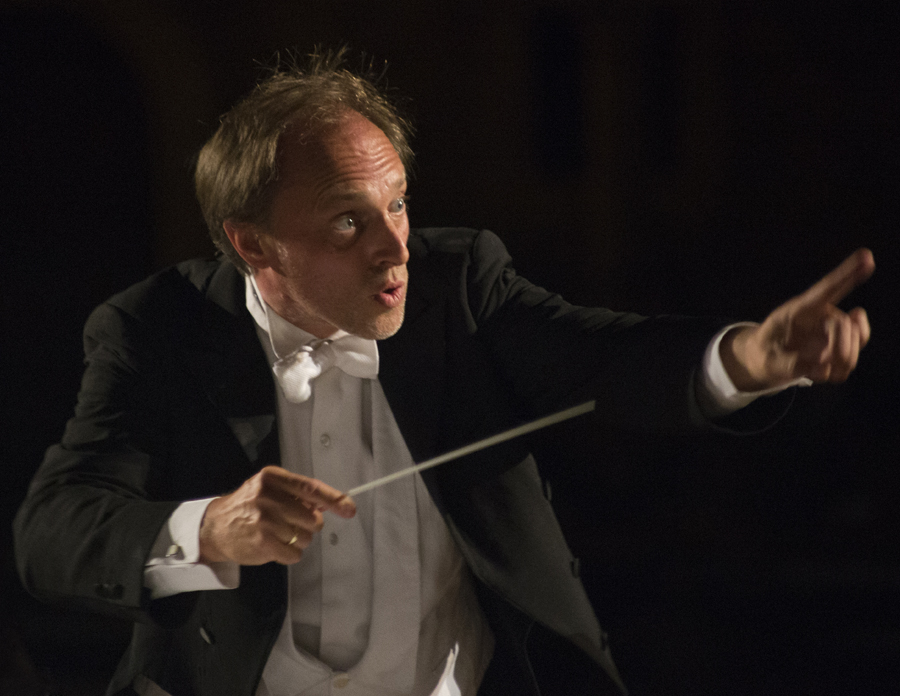
- Roland Böer in 2017
- Born: 6 December 1970 (age 55); Bad Homburg, Hesse, Germany
- Education: Hochschule für Musik Würzburg
- Occupations: Conductor; Festival manager
- Organizations: Oper Frankfurt; Cantiere Internazionale d'Arte
- Awards: Grifo Poliziano

Roland Böer (6 December 1970) is a German conductor with a focus on opera. He has worked at leading European opera houses, including the Oper Frankfurt where he began as répétiteur in 1996, was Kapellmeister from 2002 to 2008, and has often appeared as a guest. He was artistic director of the Cantiere Internazionale d'Arte in Montepulciano from 2015 to 2020.

== Life and career ==
Böer was born in Bad Homburg. He studied music at the Hochschule für Musik Würzburg, with a focus on conducting with Günther Wich. He was répétiteur at the Oper Frankfurt and musical director of the Kammeroper Frankfurt from 1996 to 1999. He then moved to the Deutsche Oper am Rhein, where he also conducted. He was an assistant of Antonio Pappano in productions of the Bayreuth Festival, La Monnaie in Brussels and the Royal Opera House in London. From 2002 to 2008, he was Kapellmeister at the Oper Frankfurt.

He worked as a guest at opera houses of Europe, including Deutsche Oper Berlin, Komische Oper Berlin, Teatro dell'Opera di Roma, at the English National Opera in London, the Royal Swedish Opera and Copenhagen Opera House, the Grand Theatre, Warsaw, the Hungarian State Opera House, Prague's State Opera, the Opéra national du Rhin, the Opéra de Nice, the Vienna Volksoper and the Opéra de Lyon. In 2018, he first conducted at the New National Theatre Tokyo. He collaborated with stage directors such Tilman Knabe, Christof Loy, David McVicar, Keith Warner and Stein Winge. His debut at La Scala in Milan, Mozart's Die Zauberflöte, directed by William Kentridge, was recorded on DVD.

Böer conducted concerts with the London Symphony Orchestra, the Royal Liverpool Philharmonic, Bournemouth Symphony Orchestra, the Filarmonica della Scala, the orchestras of the Accademia Nazionale di Santa Cecilia, the Maggio Musicale Fiorentino and the Teatro Regio di Torino, the Oslo Philharmonic, Luxembourg Philharmonic Orchestra, hr-Sinfonieorchester in Frankfurt, the Bavarian Radio Symphony Orchestra and the Deutsche Radio Philharmonie Saarbrücken Kaiserslautern. Soloists included violinists Christian Tetzlaff, Janine Jansen, Veronika Eberle, Christel Lee and Julian Rachlin, cellists Heinrich Schiff, Miklós Perényi, Mischa Maisky and Danjulo Ishizaka, and pianists Claire-Marie Le Guay, Mariangela Vacatello and Markus Bellheim. He conducted chamber orchestras such as Ensemble Modern, Royal Northern Sinfonia, the Scottish Chamber Orchestra, and the Deutsche Kammerphilharmonie Bremen.

=== Cantiere Internazionale d'Arte di Montepulciano ===
The festival Cantiere Internazionale d'Arte in Montepulciano was founded by Hans Werner Henze in 1976. Böer began as musical director in 2009 and was artistic director from 2015 to 2020. It earned him Montepulciano's award Grifo Poliziano, which includes honorary citizenship of the town.

== Recordings ==
- Adagietto (Michiè Nakamaru, Philharmonia Orchestra), EMI, TOCE-55629
- Federico Ricci: Corrado d'Altamura (Dimitra Theodossiou, Dmitry Korchak, James Westman, Ann Taylor, Andrew Foster-Williams, Cora Burggraaf, Geoffrey Mitchell Choir, Philharmonia Orchestra), work's first recording, OperaRara, ORR246
- Alexander Glazunov: Les Saisons / Robert Schumann: First Symphony in the revision by Gustav Mahler (Bamberger Symphoniker), archive production of BR
- Voice 2015: live recording of the four final concerts of the Queen Elisabeth Competition in Brussels (Orchestre de La Monnaie)
- Mozart: Die Zauberflöte – La Scala, directed by William Kentridge, stage design by Kentridge and Sabine Theunissen,) OPUS ARTE, DVD / Blu-ray (OA 1066 D)
