= Meistersingerhalle =

Concert hall in Nuremberg, Germany

Coordinates: 49°26′16″N 11°06′19″E

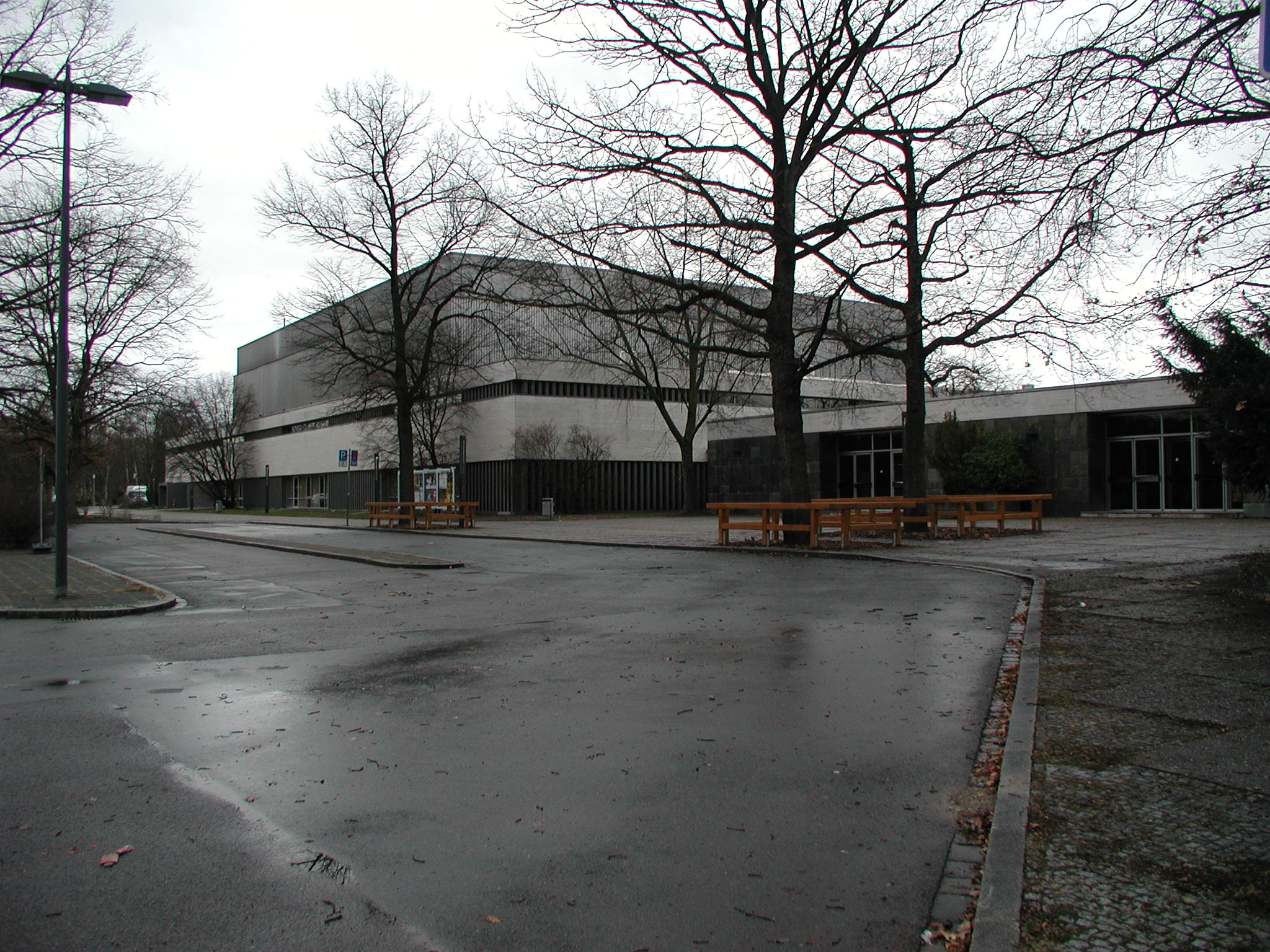
Meistersingerhalle

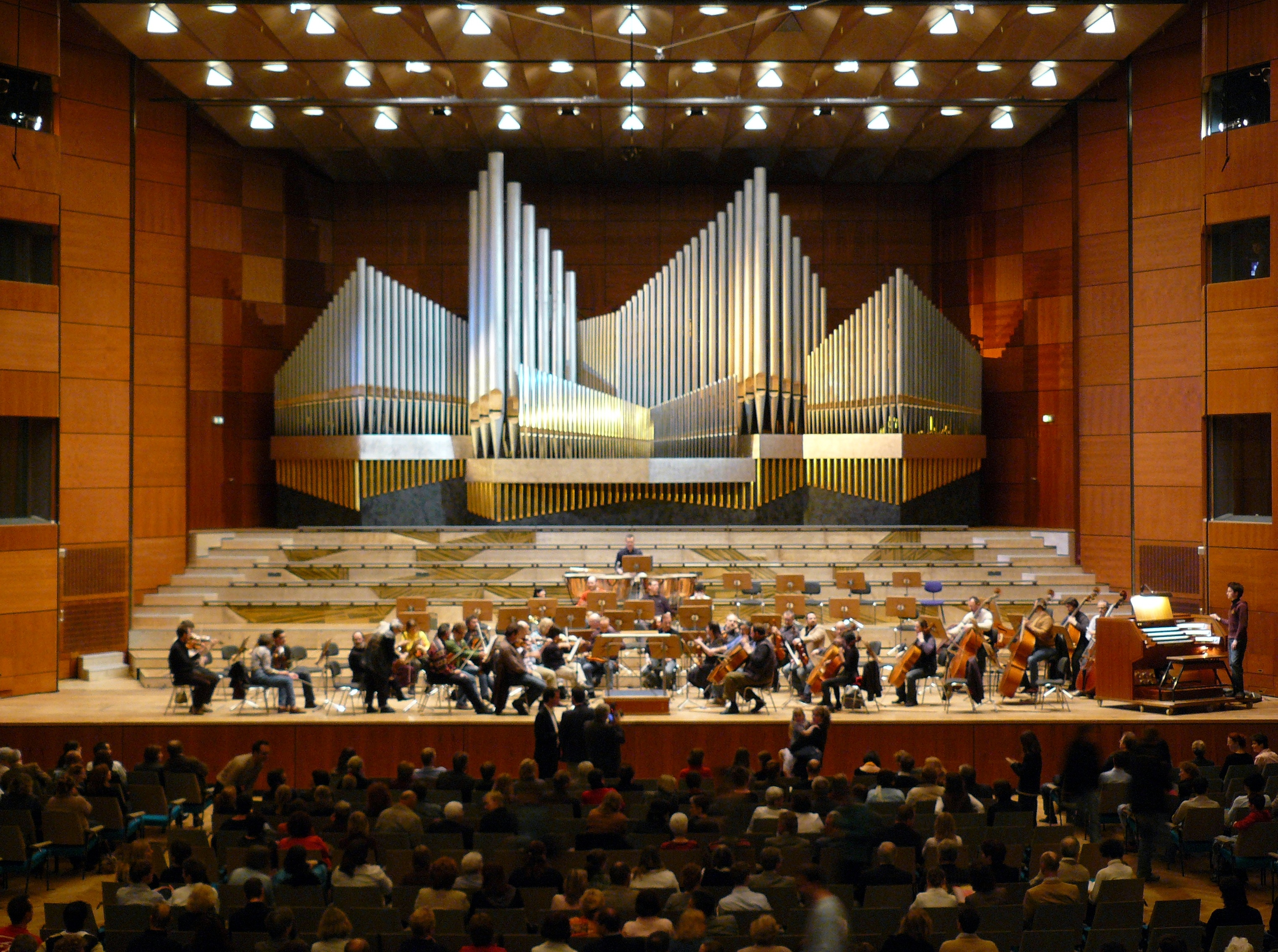
Stage in the Großer Saal with the Steinmeyer organ

Meistersingerhalle is the municipal culture and congress centre of Nuremberg, Bavaria, Germany. It is named after the tradition of the Meistersinger (Master singers) in the town, which Wagner reflected in his opera Die Meistersinger von Nürnberg. Completed in 1963, it is a listed historic monument since 2007.

== History ==
All major cultural halls in Nürnberg were destroyed in World War II, including the Luitpoldhalle. A competition for a new centre in 1958 was won by Harald Loebermann for the building and Wunibald Puchner for the interior. Built from 1960 to 1963, the hall was inaugurated on 7 September 1963.

The great hall (Großer Saal), seating 2,100 people, has a stage and features an organ, built in 1963 by G. F. Steinmeyer & Co. The foyer is used during intermissions and for exhibitions. The hall has been used for concerts, conventions, and balls. It is the venue for concert series of two orchestras, the Nürnberger Symphoniker and the Staatsphilharmonie Nürnberg, and three main concert choirs, the Hans-Sachs-Chor, the Philharmonischer Chor, and the Lehrergesangverein. Most guest performances of classical orchestras and soloists take place in the Meistersingerhalle.

The small hall (Kleiner Saal) seats 500 people and is mostly used for chamber music concerts. Both halls are equipped with recording devices.
