= Nuremberg Symphony Orchestra =

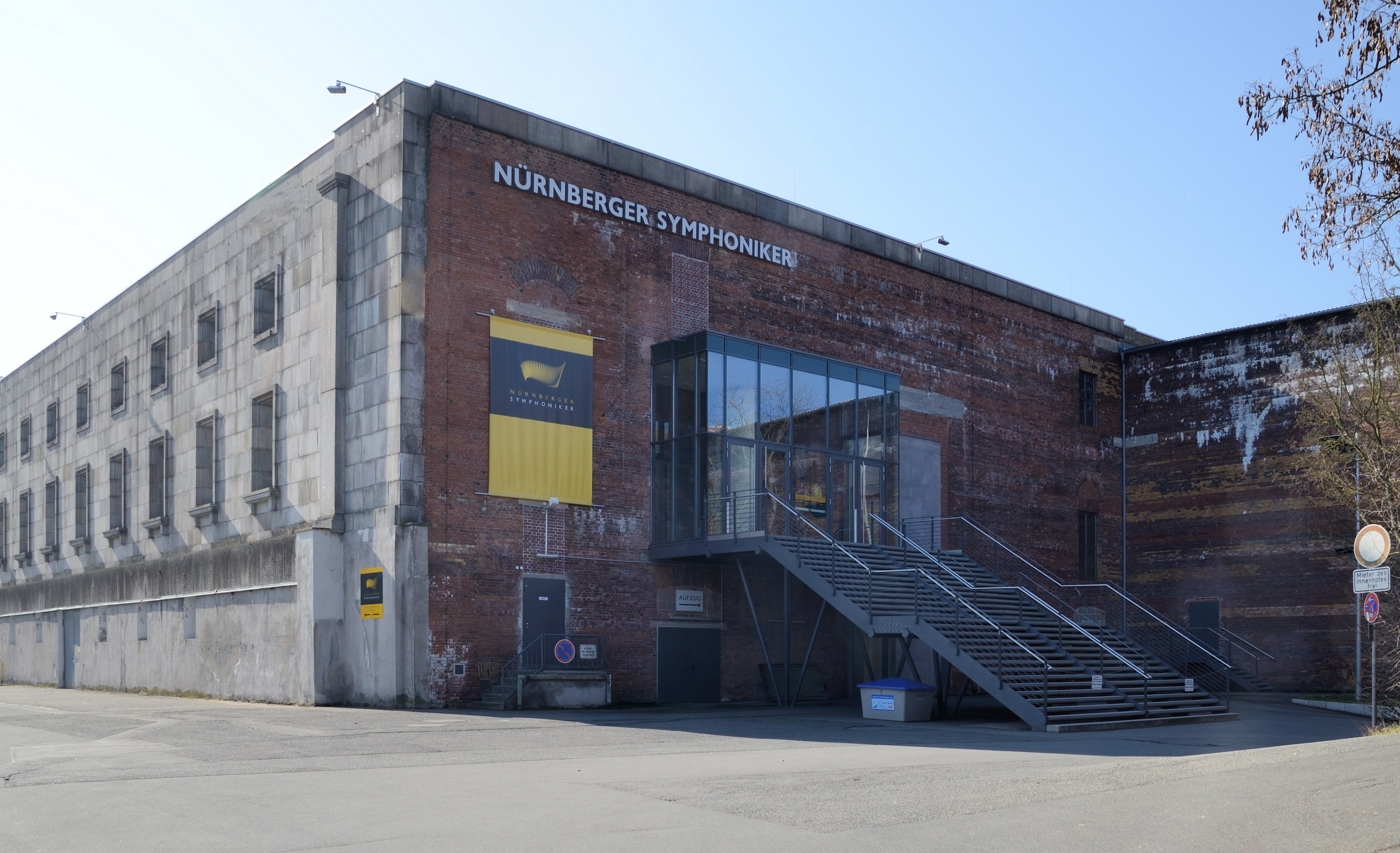
Nuremberg Symphony Orchestra

The Nuremberg Symphony Orchestra (German: Nürnberger Symphoniker) is a German orchestra based in Nuremberg. Its principal concert venue is the Meistersingerhalle. The orchestra's current Intendant (managing and artistic director) is Lucius A. Hemmer, since September 2003.

== History ==
The orchestra began in 1946 as the Franconia State Orchestra (Fränkisches Landesorchester), with Erich Kloss as its first chief conductor. In the early 1950s, the orchestra accrued international acclaim for their recordings of the sound tracks to Quo Vadis and Ben Hur by Miklós Rózsa.

The orchestra took its current name in 1963 for the dedication of the newly built Meistersingerhalle. In 1993, the orchestra won a Grammy Award in the category Best Pop Instrumental Performance for their recording of the original theme song on the soundtrack to Disney's 1991 animated film Beauty and the Beast.

Since 2008, the Nuremberg Symphony Orchestra has a new rehearsal and concert hall with a seating capacity of 515, the Neuer Musiksaal. During the summer, it also presents an open-air concert series in the Serenadenhof, the southern courtyard of the Congress Hall.

After serving as festival orchestra of the Heidenheim Opera Festival for 25 years, the Nuremberg Symphony took over the same position at Frankonian Summer Festival in 2013. The orchestra has recorded both for the Bavarian radio (Bayerischer Rundfunk) and for commercial CD labels. Every summer, the orchestra participates in Europe's largest open air classical music event, Klassik Open Air.

Recent chief conductors of the orchestra have included Alexander Shelley (2009–2017) and Kahchun Wong (2018–2022). In February 2022, the orchestra announced the appointment of Jonathan Darlington as its chief conductor, effective with the 2022–2023 season, with an initial contract of 5 years. In March 2026, the orchestra announced the extension of Darlington's contract as its chief conductor through the 2031–2032 season.

== Chief conductors ==
- Erich Kloss (1949–1968)
- Othmar Mága (1968–1970)
- Günter Neidlinger (1971–1974)
- Werner Andreas Albert (1974–1980)
- Klauspeter Seibel (1980–1988)
- Georg Schmöhe (1989–1992)
- Thomas Gabrisch (1994–1997)
- Jac van Steen (1997–2002)
- Bernhard Gueller (2005–2009)
- Alexander Shelley (2009–2017)
- Kahchun Wong (2018–2022)
- Jonathan Darlington (2022–present)
