= Christophorus oder Die Vision einer Oper =

Opera by Franz Schreker

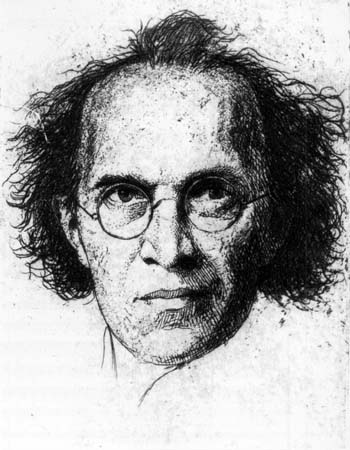
Franz Schreker in a lithograph by Heinrich Gottselig, ca. 1922

Christophorus (oder Die Vision einer Oper) is an opera in a prologue, two acts and epilogue by Franz Schreker with a German-language libretto by the composer.

== Composition history ==
Begun in 1925, work on the opera was interrupted by the composition of Der singende Teufel during 1927–28. Schreker returned to Christophorus in 1928, completing it in 1929. The work is dedicated to Arnold Schoenberg.

== Context ==
Schreker's previous opera, Irrelohe, premiered in 1924, had received a lukewarm response, its late-Romanticism being seen as out of step with the newer values of Neoclassicism and Neue Sachlichkeit being explored by a younger generation of composers. Christophorus was conceived and written partly in response to this new aesthetic and uses the smallest performing forces of any Schreker opera with a reduced orchestra and no chorus. This, together with the contemporary setting, the use of spoken dialogue and jazz and popular music elements, anticipates important aspects of the "Zeitopern" of the later 1920s as represented by works such as Krenek's Jonny spielt auf (1927) and Weill's Dreigroschenoper (1928).

An early, unrealised scenario for the opera included a plan to incorporate film interludes, foreshadowing the use of the same device in Alban Berg's Lulu (1929-35).

== Performance history ==
Originally scheduled for performance at the Theater Freiburg in 1933, pressure from the National Socialists forced its cancellation due to the composer's Jewish ancestry. Freiburg finally staged the premiere on 1 October 1978. A concert performance was given in Vienna in 1991 with the Vienna Symphony Orchestra conducted by Ingo Metzmacher and a fully staged production at Kiel Opera in 2002.

== Roles ==
Role	Voice type	Freiburg 1 October 1978 (Conductor: Klaus Weise)	Kiel 14 June 2002 (Conductor: Ulrich Windfuhr)
Meister Johann	Bass	Jan Alofs	Hans Georg Ahrens
Lisa, his daughter	Soprano	Patricia Stasis	Susan Bernhard
Anselm	Tenor	Luis Glockner	Robert Chafin
Christoph	Baritone	Steven Kimbrough	Jörg Sabrowski
Heinrich	Baritone		Matthias Klein
Amandus	Baritone		Bernd Gebhardt
Ernst	Tenor		Hans-Jürgen Schöpflin
Frederik	Baritone		Simon Pauly
The Child (boy)	Mezzo-soprano		Luise Kinner
Florence, a medium	Soprano		Monika Teepe
Etta, Lisa's maid	Spoken role		Marita Dübbers
Starkmann, editor	Spoken role		Roland Holz
Rosita	Mezzo-soprano		Jennifer Arnold
Dr. Hartung	Bass-baritone		Matthias Klein
Silia	Spoken role		Simon Pauly
Mabel	Spoken role		Marita Dübbers
Hotel guests			

== Synopsis ==
Prologue

Anselm, a young composition student, is set an assignment by his teacher Meister Johann to write a string quartet after the legend of St. Christopher. Deciding that the subject calls for dramatic treatment, Anselm instead resolves to write an opera in which he himself, his composer friend Christoph and wife Lisa (with whom Anselm is in love) are all to play parts.

Act 1

It is a year later and Anselm is hard at work on the opera. Christoph has decided to renounce composition in favour of marriage and family. After the birth of a child, Lisa is feeling unfulfilled and tormented by the loss of her looks and figure. She is increasingly attracted to Anselm, who has composed a scene for her in which she appears as a dancer representing sin and seduction. Anselm and Lisa grow increasingly aroused. Discovering them in flagrante, Christoph shoots and kills Lisa. Christoph flees with Anselm.

Act 2

Anselm and Christoph, now on the run, find themselves in a seedy night-club where they are entertained by a cabaret singer, Rosita. In a séance held by the Abbé Caldani, Christoph, high on opium, attempts to make contact with his dead wife. The scene grows increasingly intense and chaotic. Anselm realises that he is losing control of his own work.

Epilogue

Dream and reality have become hopelessly blurred. Anselm, terrified by what he has created, is unable to complete the opera and calls for his teacher for help. Meister Johann leads him back to the idea of music at its simplest and most direct. Anselm duly begins to write the string quartet.

== Instrumentation ==
- flute (doubling piccolo 2), piccolo (doubling flute 2), oboe, cor anglais (doubling oboe 2), clarinet in B♭/A, bass clarinet (doubling basset horn), bassoon, contrabassoon
- 3 horns, 2 trumpets, 2 trombones, tuba
- timpani, percussion (including musical saw), harp, piano, celesta, guitar, banjo
- strings

Onstage: tenor saxophone, piano, percussion, harmonium (ad lib.)

== Recordings ==
Christophorus: Georg Ahrens, Susanne Bernhard, Jörg Sabrowski, Robert Chafin, Matthias Klein, Bernd Gebhardt, Hans-Jürgen Schöpflin, Simon Pauly, Jennifer Arnold, Kieler Opernchor, Philharmonisches Orchester Kiel, Ulrich Windfuhr, CPO.
