= Bielefeld Opera =

Opera house and theater in Bielefeld, Germany

Coordinates: 52°01′15″N 8°32′06″E

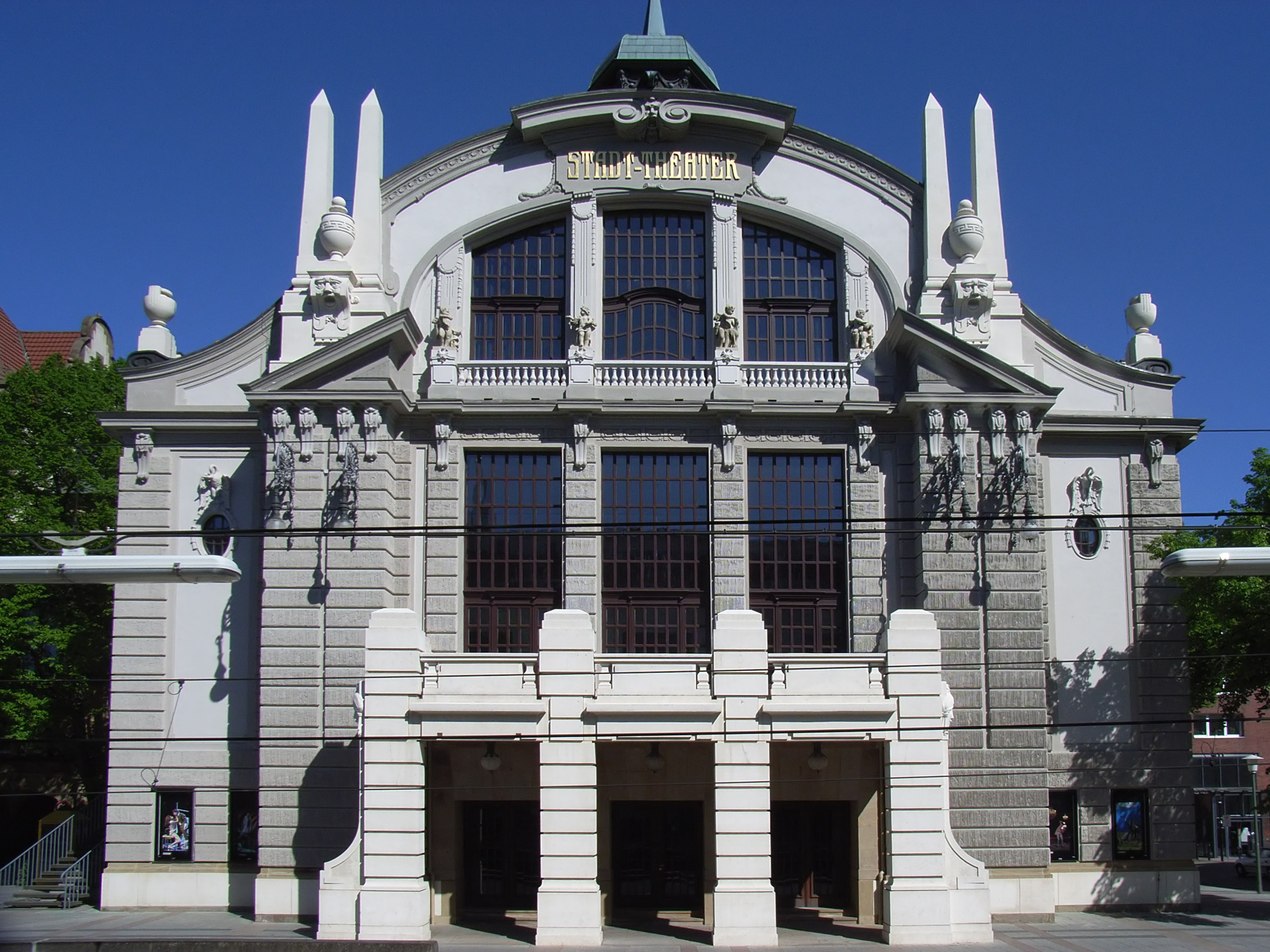
Stadttheater am Niederwall, main entrance

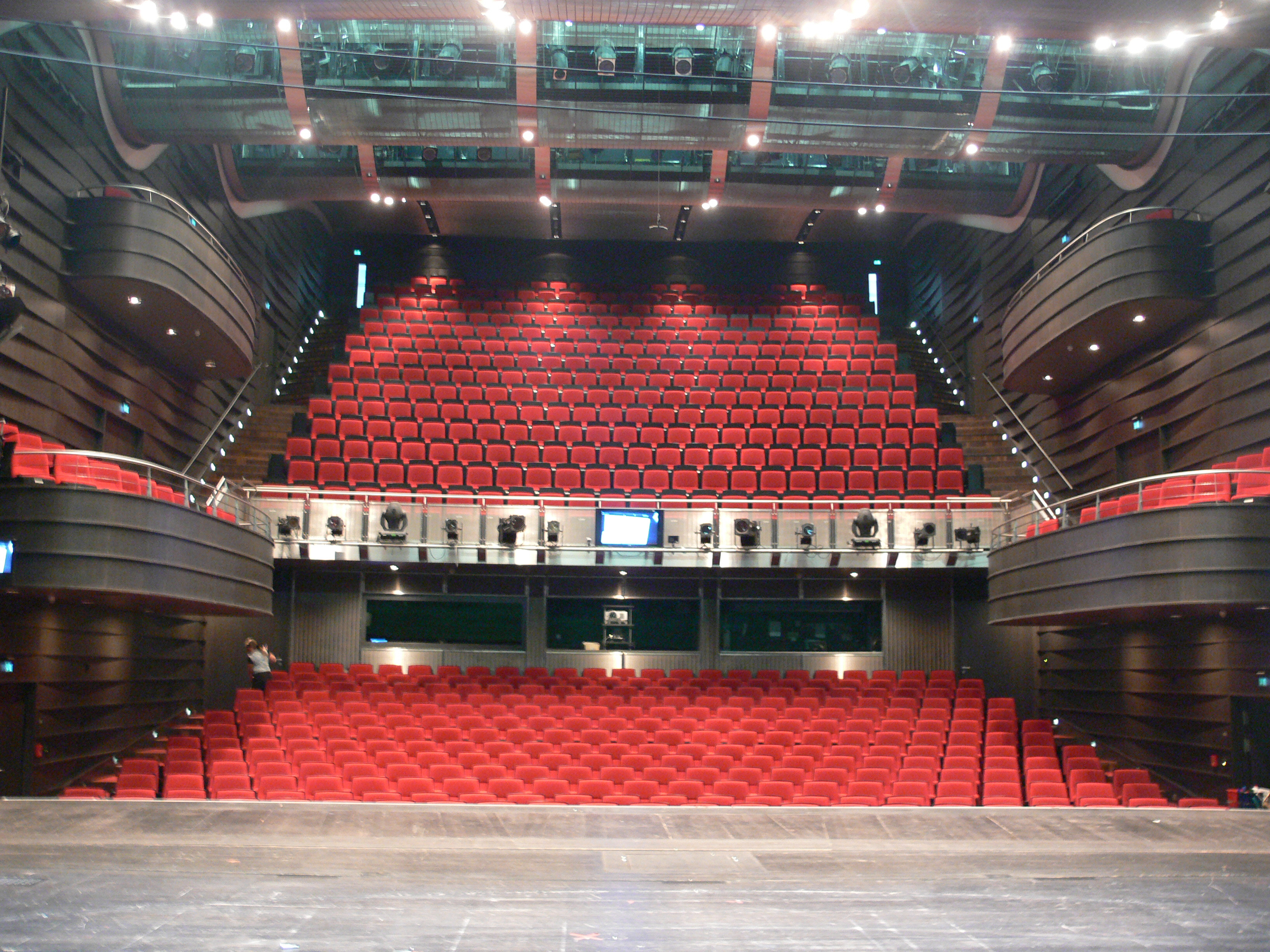
Auditorium as seen from the stage

The Bielefeld Opera is the venue of Städtische Bühnen Bielefeld (Municipal stages Bielefeld) in Bielefeld, Germany. It is a Dreisparten Haus (three-department house), offering plays, music (opera, musical theatre), and ballet. The main performance venue is the Stadttheater am Niederwall (Municipal Theatre at the Lower Wall), built in 1904 and extensively renovated from 2004 to 2006. It is the largest theater in East Westphalia, offering 500 performances annually. It is under the direction of Michael Heicks; its resident orchestra is the 72-member Bielefeld Philharmonic Orchestra that also performs symphonic concerts at the Rudolf-Oetker-Halle.. The current Generalmusikdirektor (chief conductor) of the Bielefeld Opera is Robin Davis.

== History ==
Plans to build an opera house in Bielefeld were laid in 1885 by a foundation set up the widow of the founder of the Crüwell Tobacco Company. Bernhard Sehring was chosen as architect and construction was started in 1901 on the Niederwall. The Art Nouveau building was inaugurated with a performance of Carl Maria von Weber's Der Freischütz on 3 April 1904.

The financial crisis in the 1920s led to discussions about reducing the number of employees or amalgamating with neighboring theaters in Münster and Osnabrück. When the Nazis came to power in 1933, Director Max Cahnbley was fired and replaced by Leon Geer. The building was rebuilt in 1937 but badly damaged during the bombing of Bielefeld on the night of 26 October 1944.

It proved difficult to restart normal theater life immediately after the war as the British administration forbade drama performances. Nevertheless, the opera house reopened on 1 December 1945 with a performance of Mozart's The Magic Flute. During the renovation of the building in 1960, it was decided not to renew the Art Nouveau façade; it was reconstructed for the 75th jubilee in 1979.

The Theater Foundation Bielefeld was founded in 2001 with the purpose of renovating the building again at a cost of €23 million. It was closed in 2004 for two years, but the opera ensemble continued to perform in the Rudolf-Oetker-Halle. The opera house reopened on 19 September 2006, with a performance of Mozart's The Marriage of Figaro.

== Opernwunder ==
Between 1975 and 1998, under Director Heiner Bruns and dramaturge Alexander Gruber, the Bielefeld Opera became internationally renowned as the Bielefelder Opernwunder ("Bielefeld Opera miracle"), producing a series of successful rediscoveries and premiere performances. The team, which included John Dew as stage director, Gottfried Pilz as stage designer; Rainer Koch, David de Villiers, and Geoffrey Moull as conductors, helped Bielefeld Opera attract attention of the national German and British press; critics from Gramophone, the Financial Times, and New York (Opera News) became regular visitors.

=== Programming philosophy ===
In addition to operas like Lohengrin, Così fan tutte, Der Rosenkavalier and Aida, several dramaturgical leitmotifs were to be found in the programming of the Opernwunder years of the Bruns era. A number of operas from the Entartete Kunst (degenerate art) period were performed for the first time since being banned by the Nazis in the 1930s. Publishers and opera house staff recreated lost orchestral materials for productions of Bohuslav Martinů's Julietta, Karol Rathaus' Fremde Erde, and Ernst Toch's Der Fächer. German romantic operas that had been lost since the 19th century were given new life, thus the rediscovery of Robert Schumann's Genoveva, Louis Spohr's Faust and Carl Maria von Weber's Die drei Pintos for the operatic stage. Some operas from abroad received their European premieres in Bielefeld, such as John Adams' Nixon in China and Shulamit Ran's Der Dybbuk. The Bielefeld Opera also produced a number of world premieres, including Nikolai Karetnikov's Till Eulenspiegel and Michael Hirsch's Das stille Zimmer.

=== Operatic productions ===
Nearly half of all new productions of the Bielefeld Opera between 1980 and 1998 were of innovative operas, including:

- Luigi Cherubini: Médée (Cherubini)
- Max Brand: Machinist Hopkins
- Paul Hindemith: Neues vom Tage
- Rudi Stephan: Die ersten Menschen
- Franz Schreker: Irrelohe
- Franz Schreker: Der Schmied von Gent
- Franz Schreker: Der singende Teufel
- Erich Wolfgang Korngold: Das Wunder der Heliane
- Karol Rathaus: Fremde Erde
- André Grétry: Zemire und Azor
- Thea Musgrave: Maria Stuart
- George Antheil: Transatlantik
- Erwin Dressel: Armer Columbus
- Leonard Bernstein: A Quiet Place
- Frederick Delius: Fennimore and Gerda
- Giacomo Meyerbeer: Der Prophet
- Ernst Krenek: Der Sprung über den Schatten
- Ernst Krenek: Die Zwingburg
- Ernst Krenek: Der Diktator
- Rudolf Mors: Der Kreidekreis (1983, premiere)
- Fromental Halévy: Die Jüdin
- John Adams: Nixon in China
- Douglas Moore: Die Ballade von Baby Doe
- Bohuslav Martinů: Julietta
- Robert Schumann: Genoveva
- Louis Spohr: Faust
- Roberto Gerhard: The Duenna
- Nikolai Karetnikov: Till Eulenspiegel (1993, premiere)
- Judith Weir: Der blonde Eckbert
- Ernst Toch: Der Fächer
- Carl Maria von Weber/Gustav Mahler: Die drei Pintos
- Theo Loevendie: Esmée (about Esmée van Eeghen)
- Luigi Dallapiccola: Il prigioniero
- Kurt Weill: Die Bürgschaft
- Shulamit Ran: Der Dybbuk
- Michael Hirsch: Das stille Zimmer

=== CD recordings ===
The Bielefeld Opera has produced the following complete opera recordings:

- Krenek, Ernst; Villiers, David de; Brüning, Thomas; Kemeny, Lynda; Amos, Diana; Pflieger, John; Neuweiler, Ulrich; Dürmüller, Jörg; Lewandowski, Hagen; Philharmonisches Orchester <Bielefeld>.; Musiktheater Chor (1990), Der Sprung über den Schatten : comic opera in three acts = The leap over the shadow (in German), Osnabrück: Cpo, OCLC 311612600
- Bernard, Joseph Karl; Spohr, Louis; Naxos Digital Services US (1994), SPOHR, L.: Faust [Opera] (1852 version) (Jennings, Taha, Vier, Bielefeld Opera Chorus and Philharmonic, Moull), Hong Kong: Naxos Digital Services US Inc, OCLC 8185890813
- Ullmann, Viktor; Steffen, Albert; Neuweiler, Ulrich; Decker, Richard; Oberholtzer, William; Gentile, Louis; Jaffe, Monte; Partanen, Lassi; Koch, Rainer; Musiktheater Chor; Philharmonisches Orchester <Bielefeld>. (1996), Der Sturz des Antichrist Oper in drei Akten = The fall of the Antichrist (in German), Georgsmarienhütte: CPO, Classic Prod. Osnabrück, OCLC 314739381
- Loevendie, Theo; Blokker, Jan; Thompson, Margaret; Oberholtzer, William; Martin, Luca; Jaffe, Monte; Neuweiler, Ulrich; Bergmann, Nikolaus; Moull, Geoffrey; Philharmonisches Orchester (Bielefeld); Städtische Bühnen Chor; Städtische Bühnen Extrachor (1997), Esmée : opera in three acts (in undetermined language), Amsterdam: Donmus, OCLC 163139092
