= Ulrich Windfuhr =

German conductor (born 1960)

Ulrich Windfuhr (born 1960) is a German conductor.

== Life ==
Born in Heidelberg, Windfuhr grew up as the son of the Heine researcher and editor Manfred Windfuhr, first in his hometown and later in Düsseldorf. From 1978 Windfuhr studied orchestral conducting in Cologne, Vienna and Florence and attended master classes with Franco Ferrara, Carlo Maria Giulini, Gennady Rozhdestvensky, Leonard Bernstein and Günter Ludwig. In 1985 Windfuhr won the International Conducting Competition Vittorio Gui and in 1986 the International Conducting Competition Janos Ferencic in Budapest.

He received his first engagement in 1986 as a répétiteur with conducting duties at the Theater Dortmund, in 1989 he went to the Theater Augsburg as the second Kapellmeister and director of studies, in 1990 as the first coordinated Kapellmeister to the then Opera House, today's Staatstheater Nürnberg. In 1993 he received his engagement as first Kapellmeister at the Niedersächsische Staatstheater Hannover. Two years later he was engaged as first conductor and deputy general music director at the Badisches Staatstheater Karlsruhe, again one year later he became provisional general music director there.

From 1998 to 2003, Windfuhr worked alongside Director-General Kirsten Harms as music director of the stages of the State Capital Kiel. With productions of Richard Strauss' operas such as Die schweigsame Frau and Die Liebe der Danae, a cycle of Franz Schreker's operas as well as the Ring des Nibelungen by Richard Wagner, he attracted international attention together with the opera house.

His concert career has taken him from the beginning of his career through Europe (Italy, Portugal, Switzerland, Hungary) and to the USA; as an opera conductor he has appeared on renowned German stages, including the Deutsche Oper am Rhein Düsseldorf-Duisburg, at the Opera Bonn, at the Mannheim National Theatre and at the Deutsche Oper Berlin.

At the Kiel Opera Windfuhr recorded for the label Classic Production Osnabrück among others, Flammen, Das Spielwerk und die Prinzessin and Christophorus oder Die Vision einer Oper by Franz Schreker as well as Donna Diana by Emil Nikolaus von Reznicek. In 2003 he was awarded the Diapason d'Or and the "Choc de la Musique" for his CD Das Spielwerk und die Prinzessin as well as the Quarterly Prize of the German Record Critics; in 2005 he received the Orphée d'Or for his CD Die Liebe der Danae.

From 2007 to 2013 Windfuhr was Professor of Conducting at the Hochschule für Musik und Theater Leipzig, where his students included Mirga Gražinytė-Tyla.

In 2013, he was appointed professor of conducting and orchestral conducting at the Hochschule für Musik und Theater Hamburg.

In 2014, Windfuhr was named a member of the Freie Akademie der Künste Hamburg.
