= Flammen (Schreker) =

Opera by Franz Schreker

- Opera by Franz Schreker
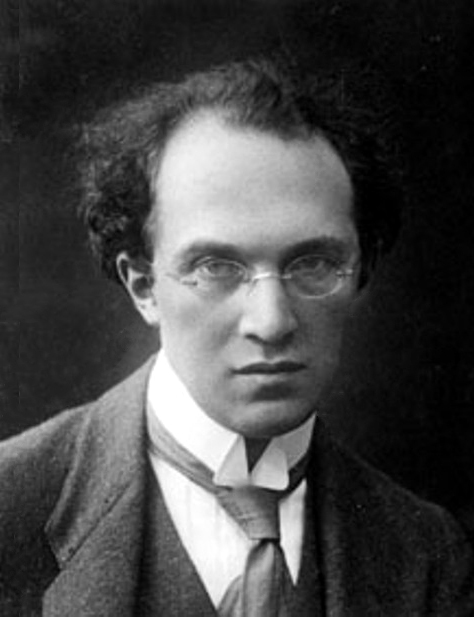
- The composer in 1912
- Translation: Flames
- Librettist: Dora Leen
- Language: German
- Premiere: 2 June 1985 (chamber version); Pianopianissimo Musiktheater, Munich

Flammen (Flames) is a one-act opera by Franz Schreker, on a libretto by Dora Leen, pseudonym of Dora Pollak (born 23 October 1880, died Auschwitz c. 1942).

== Composition history ==
Dora Pollak's father, the well-known Viennese doctor Siegmund Pollak, was personal physician to Ferdinand von Saar, an important Austrian literary figure and also Schreker's friend and mentor in Vienna. It was von Saar who arranged the meeting between the librettist and the composer. Schreker began composition after August 1901 and completed the opera, his first, before April 1902.

== Performance history ==
The opera was first given in a concert performance, with piano accompaniment only, on 24 April 1902 at the Bösendorfer-Saal in Vienna. Schreker had copies of the libretto and vocal score printed to try to promote the work but it met with little interest from the conductors and opera houses he sent it to. The complete opera remained unpublished during Schreker's lifetime. However, Schreker did have two individual numbers published by Universal Edition in 1922: "Gebet der Agnes" (Agnes' prayer) (from scene 11) and "Gesang der Irmgard" (Irmgard's song) (from scene 17), both for soprano and orchestra.

On 2 June 1985 the opera's first staged performance took place at the Pianopianissimo Musiktheater in Munich under conductor Frank Strobel with the orchestration arranged for instrumental quintet. The first staging with the full original orchestration took place at the Kiel Opera House on 17 June 2001 directed by Markus Bothe. This production used orchestral material prepared for this performance by the Franz Schreker Society in Paris. The Kiel Philharmonic Orchestra and Chorus were conducted by Ulrich Windfuhr with Manuela Uhl, Jörg Sabrowski and Robert Chafin in the leading roles.

In August 2022, a new production was staged in Lithuania by the Opera Accelerator company, directed by Karina Novikova and conducted by Martynas Stakionis.

== Roles ==
Roles, voice types
Role	Voice type
The prince	baritone
Irmgard, his wife	soprano
Agnes, his sister	soprano
The minstrel	tenor
Margot, a dowager	contralto
A knight	bass

== Synopsis ==
Place: The prince's castle.
Time: The end of the First Crusade.

Three years ago, when the prince left for the Holy Land on the First Crusade, he made a covenant with God. His parting words were that if Irmgard, his wife, were to fall in love with another man during his absence, her welcome kiss on his return would strike him dead. Irmgard is hurt by this lack of confidence. Every day Agnes, the prince's sister, and the dowager Margot remind Irmgard of this covenant. This leads to an inner conflict, which becomes critical when a travelling minstrel, who stays at the castle as a guest, sings of passion and love as omnipotent forces, and arouses amorous feelings in Irmgard.

A horn signal announces the imminent return of the prince, and Irmgard orders the servants to prepare a festive welcome. Agnes, who has noticed what has occurred between Irmgard and the minstrel, prays for her brother's life. Finally, Irmgard, torn between love and duty, orders the minstrel to leave.

When the crusaders, led by the prince, return, the prince tries to kiss his wife. She evades his kiss by saying that she must first drink a toast to him. She collapses (the drink is poisoned), still refusing to kiss him. She then reveals to the prince how unhappy his emotional blackmail has made her, and explains that only her suicide can now save his life, alluding to her love for the minstrel. She dies and the prince, regaining his composure, enters the castle with firm strides.

== Recordings ==
The 1985 Munich PPP Music Theatre production, with the accompaniment arranged for instrumental quintet, was released on Marco Polo in 1993.

In 2001 CPO released the world premiere recording of the full original version: a live recording of the 17 June 2001 performance at the Kiel Opera, with Ulrich Windfuhr conducting the Kiel Philharmonic Orchestra and Chorus.
