= Der Schmied von Gent =

Opera by Franz Schreker

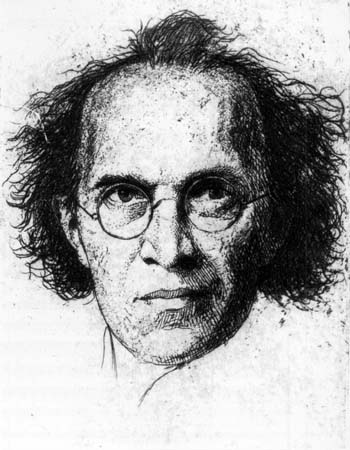
Franz Schreker in a lithograph by Heinrich Gottselig, ca. 1922

Der Schmied von Gent is a "Grand magical opera" in three acts by Franz Schreker with a German-language libretto by the composer after the story Smetse Smee by the Flemish author Charles de Coster.

== Composition history ==
The work was composed between 1929 and 1932 and published by Universal Edition. It was the composer's final completed opera.

== Performance history ==
The work was first performed at the Berlin Städtische Oper on 29 October 1932 conducted by Paul Breisach. The performance was marred by right-wing demonstrations directed at the composer due to his Jewish heritage. The first performance in modern times was at the Berlin Staatsoper in 1981 conducted by Rolf Reuter. Further productions have taken place at Bielefeld Opera (1991), Chemnitz Opera (2010), Flemish Opera (2020), Theater Münster (2023) and Nationaltheater Mannheim (2025).

== Synopsis ==
Act 1

Smee owns a smithy on the banks of the River Leie in Ghent during the Eighty Years War when the region was struggling for independence from the ruling Spanish. Smee makes no secret of his loathing of the Spaniards and, after being denounced to the authorities by a rival, the drunkard Slimbroek, loses his business and livelihood. He is on the point of drowning himself in the river when mysterious voices call him from the trees, offering him seven years of wealth and prosperity in return for his soul. Reluctantly, Smee agrees and his smithy enjoys a miraculous recovery, to the amazement of Smee’s wife who is unaware of the devilish pact.

Act 2

The seven years are almost at an end and Smee is agonising over his fate. A man and a woman with an infant child appear at the forge: their donkey has lost a shoe which Smee, now wealthier than he could ever have imagined, is happy to replace without charge. The family is revealed as Joseph, Mary and the infant Jesus. In return for his generosity, Joseph grants the blacksmith three wishes with which Smee is able to dupe the three emissaries of Hell which come to claim his soul: the executioner Hessels, the Duke of Alba and Satan’s mistress Astarte. But, in an infernal vision, Lucifer himself appears and the smithy disappears into the Leie.

Act 3

Smee, now old and with his forge gone, dies with his wife at his side and begins his journey to the other world. At first, he arrives at the gates of Hell, but the devils, remembering the trouncing he inflicted on them earlier, want nothing to do with him. He then approaches the gates of Heaven but is refused entry by St. Peter. With nowhere to go, Smee decides to open a stall serving food and drink to new arrivals. Former acquaintances from Ghent (including Slimbroek) soon appear and they join in a lively drinking song. When Smee’s wife arrives, she intercedes with St. Joseph and, after weighing his good deeds against his bad, Joseph finally admits Smee entry into Paradise.

== Recordings ==
Der Schmied von Gent: Oliver Zwarg, Undine Dreißig, Andre Riemer, Judith Kuhn, Chor der Oper Chemnitz, Robert-Schumann-Philharmonie, Frank Beermann, CPO.
