= Der Geburtstag der Infantin =

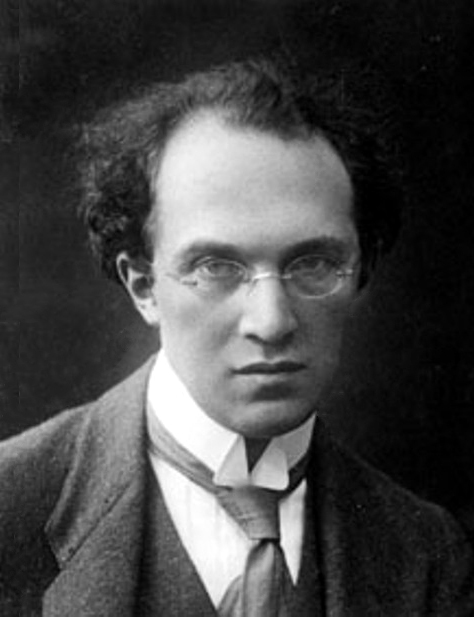
Franz Schreker, c. 1911

Der Geburtstag der Infantin is a “dance-pantomime” in one act by Austrian composer Franz Schreker, based on the Oscar Wilde novella The Birthday of the Infanta.

== Background ==
The work was commissioned by the sisters Elsa and Grete Wiesenthal, two former apprentice dancers from the Vienna Court Opera. The work was composed in just ten days and first performed in Vienna on 27 June 1908 as part of the ‘Kunstschau’ organised by the group of artists around Gustav Klimt. It brought Schreker widespread recognition and led to the offer of a publishing contract with Universal Edition. The composer revised the score in 1910, adding an extra scene near the beginning (‘Die Infantin’) and rewriting the final scene.

== Instrumentation ==
The ballet is scored for a chamber orchestra of two flutes (second doubling piccolo), two oboes, two clarinets, two bassoons, two horns, two trumpets, timpani, percussion, harp and strings.

== 1923 Suite ==
In 1923, Schreker arranged the music (omitting the closing scene) as a Suite for large orchestra which was first performed in Amsterdam on 23 October 1923 by the Concertgebouw Orchestra under Willem Mengelberg, to whom the new suite was dedicated. This suite later served as the basis for an entirely new ballet entitled Spanisches Fest which was premiered on 22 January 1927 at the Berlin State Opera in a choreography by Max Terpis.
