= Chamber Symphony (Schreker) =

Instrumental work by Franz Schreker

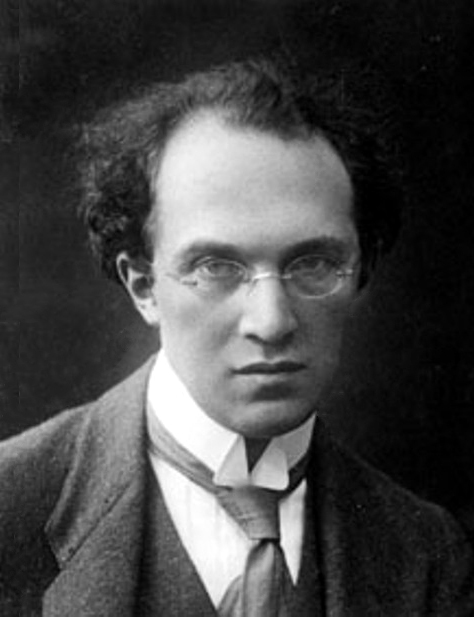
Franz Schreker, c. 1911

The Chamber Symphony is an instrumental work by Austrian composer Franz Schreker. It was composed in 1916 for the centenary of the Vienna Music Academy where Schreker had been teaching since 1912. The musical material is partly derived from an abandoned opera project entitled Die tönenden Sphären for which Schreker wrote the libretto and part of the music in 1915.

The work has a double-function form, which compresses the four movements of a traditional symphony into a single larger one, after the example of Arnold Schoenberg’s Chamber Symphony No. 1.

The work lasts approximately 25 minutes in performance.

== Performance history ==
The work was first performed on 12 March 1917 by an orchestra consisting of professors from the Vienna Academy, conducted by the composer. The work was also performed at the composer's memorial concert in Vienna in March 1935. It is one of Schreker’s most frequently performed compositions.

== Instrumentation ==
Although often described as a work for 23 solo instruments, the orchestral requirements actually stipulate a minimum of 24 players: flute, oboe, clarinet in B♭/A, bassoon, horn, trumpet, trombone, timpani, percussion (xylophone, glockenspiel, cymbals, triangle, tam-tam), harp, piano, celesta, harmonium, and a small string section consisting of four violins, two violas, three cellos and two double basses. In the preface to the score, the composer recommends augmenting the strings for performances in larger halls.
