= Mirga Gražinytė-Tyla =

Lithuanian conductor

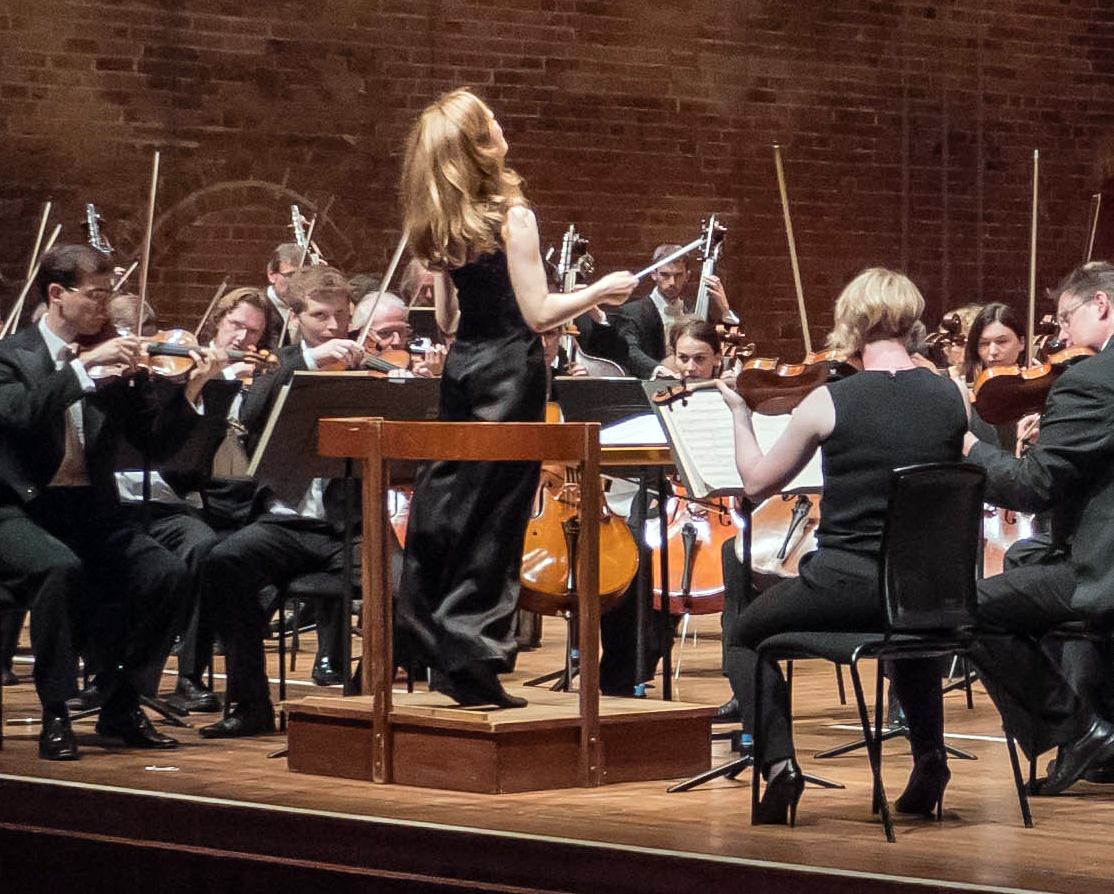
- Conducting the City of Birmingham Symphony Orchestra at the Aldeburgh Festival in 2017
- Born: 29 August 1986 (age 40); Vilnius, Lithuania
- Education: University of Music and Performing Arts Graz
- Occupation: Conductor
- Organization: City of Birmingham Symphony Orchestra

Mirga Gražinytė-Tyla (born Mirga Gražinytė, 29 August 1986) is a Lithuanian conductor.

== Biography ==
=== Early years and education ===
Gražinytė-Tyla was born in Vilnius on 2 April 1986. Her father, Romualdas Gražinis, is a choir conductor affiliated with the Aidija Chamber Choir in Vilnius. Her mother Sigutė Gražinienė is a pianist and singer. Her grandmother Beata Vasiliauskaitė-Šmidtienė was a violinist. Her great-uncle was an organist, and her great-aunt was a composer. The oldest of three siblings, her sister Onutė Gražinytė is a pianist, and she has a younger brother, Adomas Gražinis.

As a child, Gražinytė-Tyla received her initial education in French and painting, and studied at the National M. K. Čiurlionis School of Art in Vilnius. At age 11, she decided that she wanted to study music, and the one remaining musical programme option was choral conducting. She subsequently received musical training and education without ever playing a musical instrument. She first conducted a choir at age 13. She subsequently continued music studies at the University of Music and Performing Arts Graz, where her instructors included Johannes Prinz, and completed her degree in 2007. She subsequently studied conducting at the University of Music and Theatre Leipzig with Ulrich Windfuhr and the Zurich University of the Arts (where her mentors included Johannes Schlaefli). Gražinytė-Tyla chose to add the word 'Tyla', Lithuanian for 'silence', to form her professional name.

=== Career ===
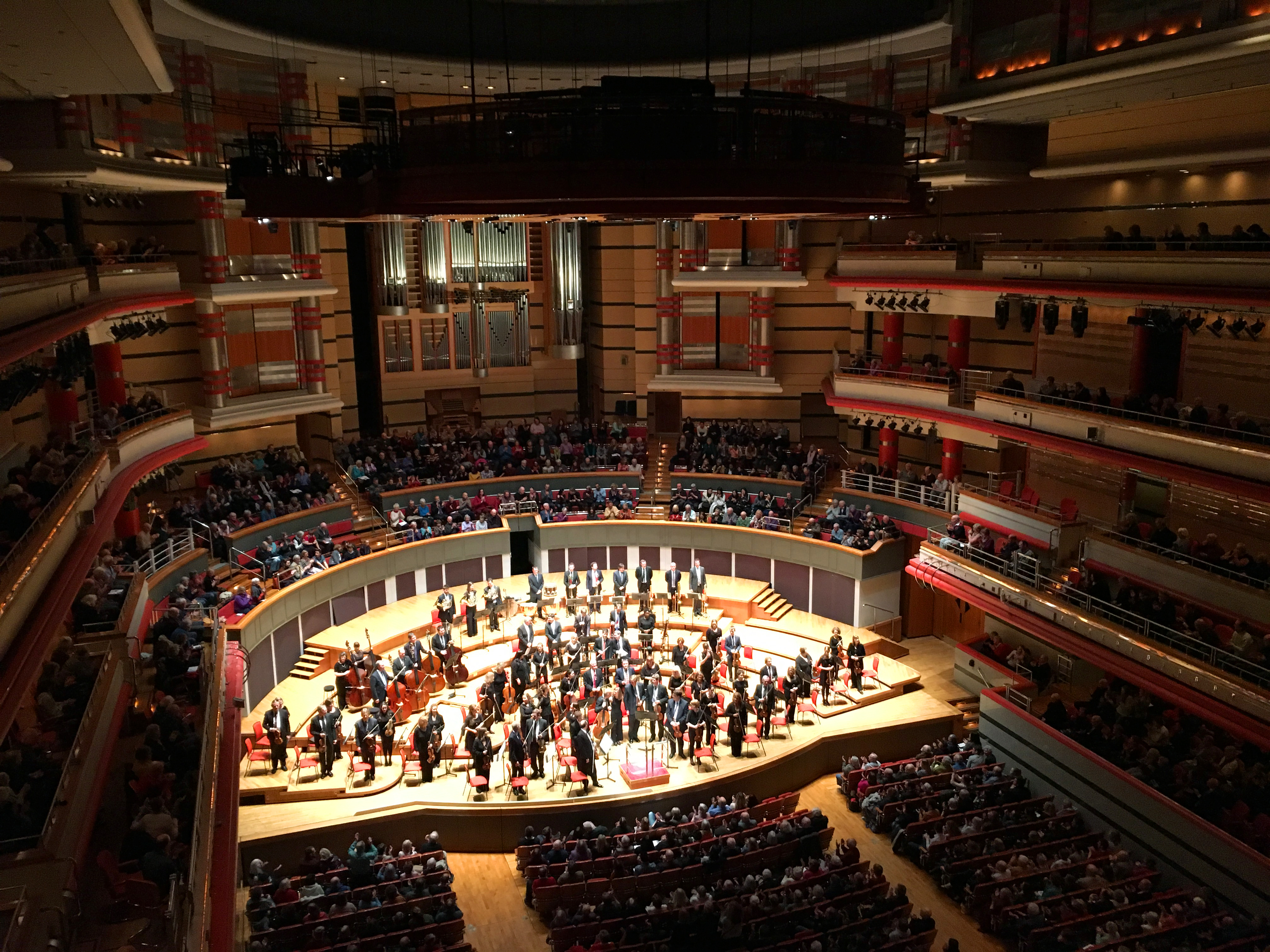
Gražinytė-Tyla and the CBSO take the applause after a performance at Symphony Hall, Birmingham in January 2017

Gražinytė-Tyla became Second Kapellmeister (2. Kapellmeisterin) at the Theater Heidelberg in the 2011–2012 season. In 2012, she won the Nestlé and Salzburg Young Conductors Competition. With the 2013–2014 season, she became First Kapellmeister (1. Kapellmeisterin) at the Bern Opera. Gražinytė-Tyla became music director of the Salzburger Landestheater with the 2015–2016 season, with an initial contract of 2 seasons. She concluded her music directorship of the Salzburger Landestheater after the 2016–2017 season.

In the US, Gražinytė-Tyla was a Gustavo Dudamel Fellow of the Los Angeles Philharmonic for the 2012–2013 season. In July 2014, she was named the orchestra's assistant conductor, on a 2-year contract. In August 2015, the orchestra named her its new associate conductor, effective with the end of the 2015–2016 season, contracted through 2017.

In July 2015, Gražinytė-Tyla first guest-conducted the City of Birmingham Symphony Orchestra (CBSO). She was subsequently engaged for an additional concert with the CBSO in January 2016. In February 2016, the CBSO named her as its next music director, effective September 2016, with an initial contract of 3 years. She conducted her first concert as CBSO music director on 26 August 2016 in Birmingham, and made her first appearance at The Proms the following evening, 27 August 2016. Gražinytė-Tyla is the first female conductor to be named music director of the CBSO. In May 2018, the CBSO announced the extension of Gražinytė-Tyla's contract as its music director through the 2020–2021 season. Gražinytė-Tyla concluded her tenure as CBSO music director after the 2021–2022 season, and subsequently to take on the post of principal guest conductor of the CBSO. She currently has the title of associate artist with the CBSO.

In February 2019, Gražinytė-Tyla signed an exclusive long-term recording contract with Deutsche Grammophon (DG). She is the first female conductor ever to sign an exclusive recording contract with DG. Her first DG recording, issued in 2019, was of symphonies of Mieczysław Weinberg, with the CBSO. In October 2020, it won the 'Album of the Year' prize at the annual Gramophone Awards. Her following DG albums include works by Raminta Šerkšnytė, Benjamin Britten, Ralph Vaughan Williams and William Walton.

In 2021, Gražinytė-Tyla first guest-conducted the Orchestre philharmonique de Radio France. In November 2025, the orchestra announced the appointment of Gražinytė-Tyla as its next principal guest conductor, the first female conductor to be named to the post, effective in September 2026, with an initial contract of three years.

=== Personal life ===
Gražinytė-Tyla's partner is Frank Stadler, concertmaster of the Mozarteum Orchestra Salzburg. The couple has two sons (one born on 26 August 2018, and the other born in August 2020) and one daughter (born in April 2022). The family maintains a residence in Salzburg.

Cultural offices
| Preceded by Leo Hussain | Music Director, Salzburger Landestheater; 2015–2017 | Succeeded by Adrian Kelly |
