= Moritz Nähr =

Austrian photographer

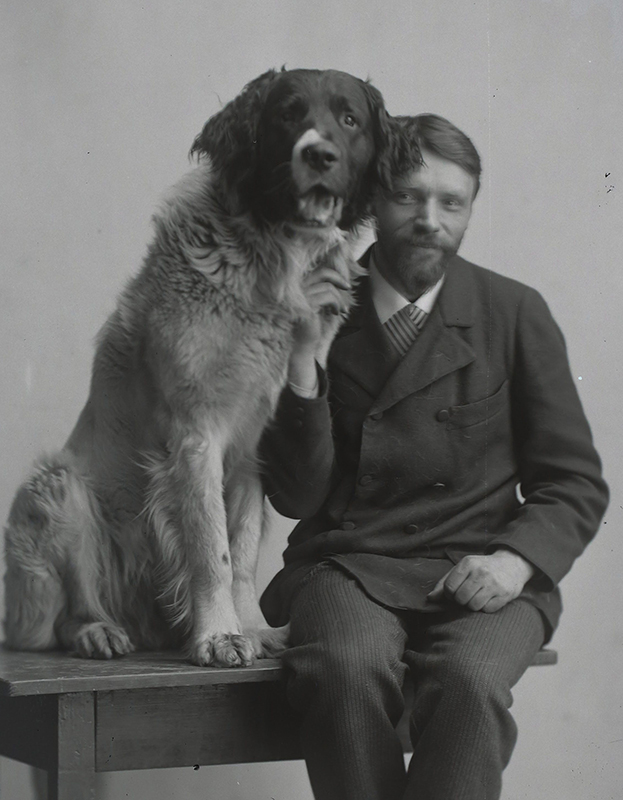
Moriz Nähr with his dog

Moriz Nähr (born 4 August 1859 in Vienna; died 29 June 1945 in Vienna) was an Austrian photographer. Nähr was a friend of the members of the Vienna Secession art group. He is best known for his portraits of Gustav Klimt, Gustav Mahler, and Ludwig Wittgenstein.

== Portraits ==
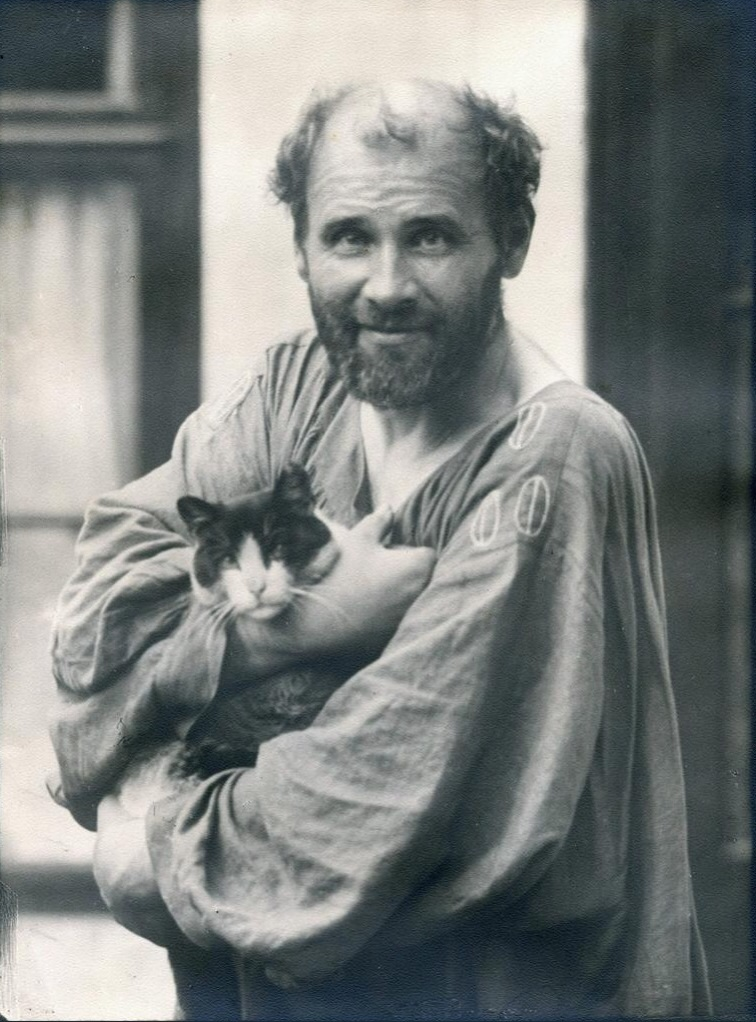
Austrian symbolist painter Gustav Klimt

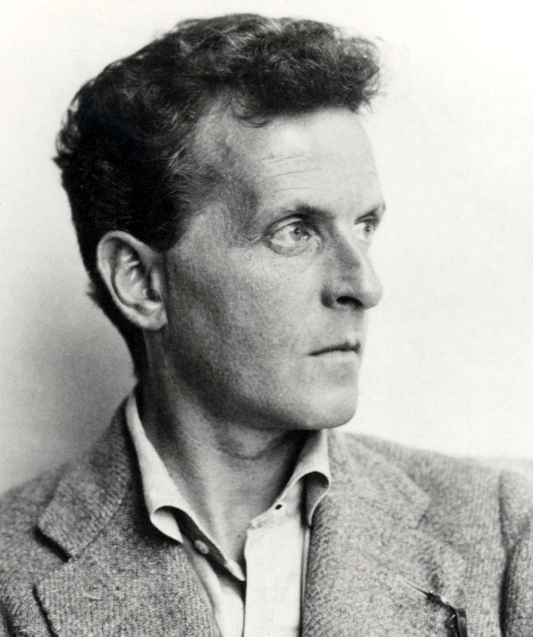
Philosopher Ludwig Wittgenstein

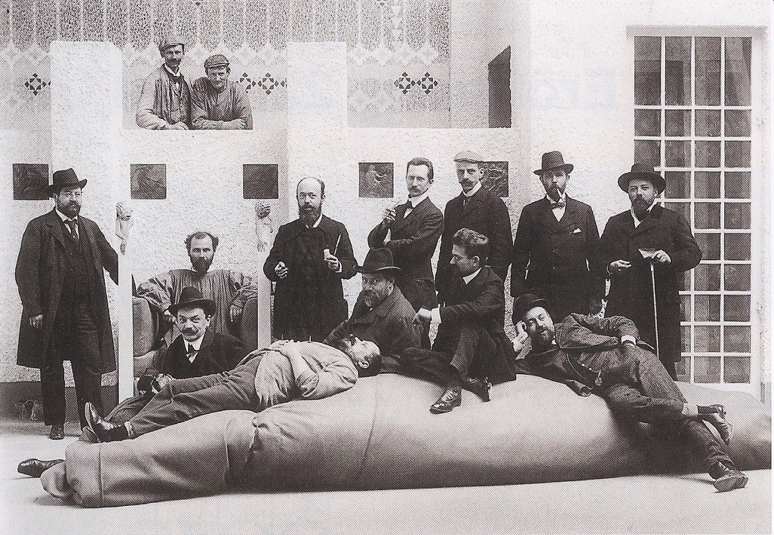
Secession Group, Vienna, 1902

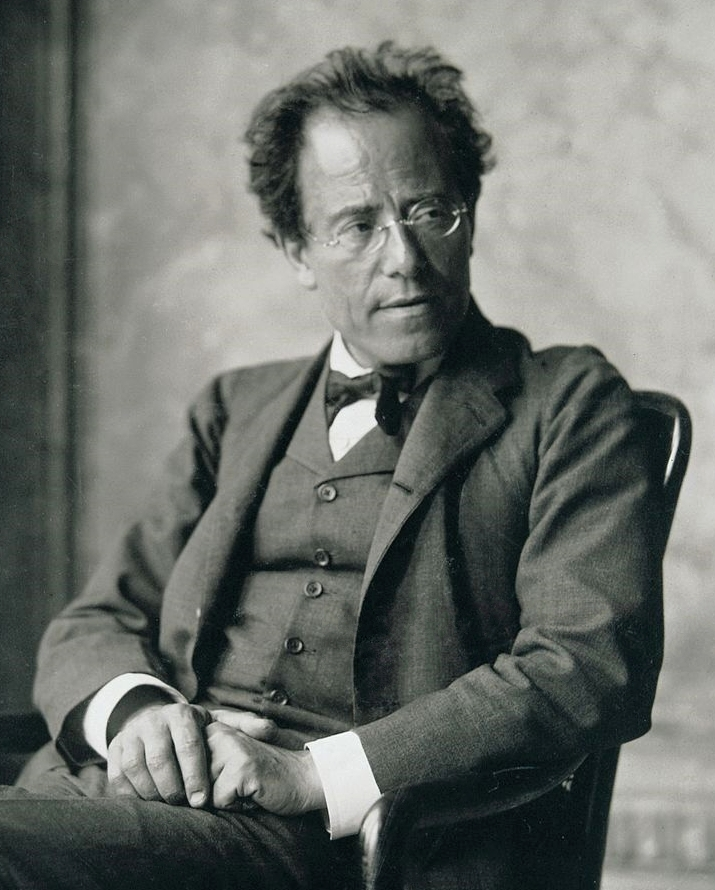
Gustav Mahler

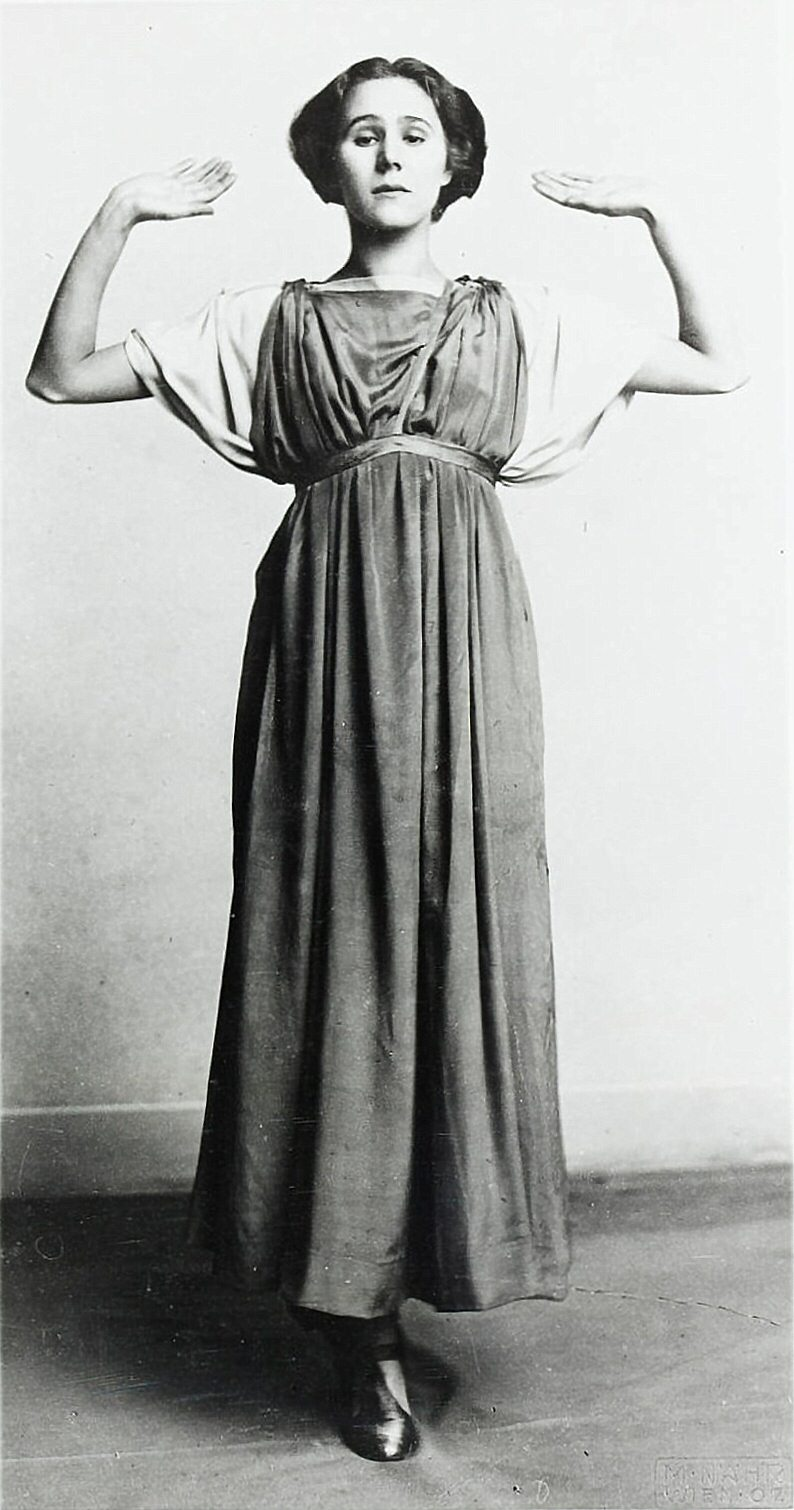
Grete Wiesenthal, 1906/8
