= Thomas Johannes Mayer =

German opera singer (1969–2025)

- Mayer c. 2010
- Born: 30 October 1969; Bensheim, Hesse, West Germany
- Died: 15 December 2025 (aged 56)
- Education: Musikhochschule Köln
- Occupation: Baritone
- Organizations: Hamburg State Opera; Bavarian State Opera

Thomas Johannes Mayer (30 October 1969 – 15 December 2025) was a German baritone who performed at major opera houses internationally. He was known for portraying Wagner roles such as Amfortas in Parsifal, Telramund in Lohengrin, and Wotan in the Ring cycle. Mayer gained international recognition when he sang the title role of Alban Berg's Wozzeck at La Scala in Milan. He performed the title role of Manfred Trojahn's Orest at the Vienna State Opera in 2019. His voice could fill large opera houses but was flexible enough for the finest nuances, and with an unusual understanding and clear pronunciation of the texts.

== Life and career ==
Mayer was born in Bensheim on 30 October 1969, and grew up in Bürstadt. He began singing in public at age three in a village carnival session before Lent, encouraged by his grandfather who had composed the tune. As a teenager, Mayer started his own band, signed a record contract, and performed at festivals in various genres, including jazz, rock, pop, and punk.

When a tonsillectomy at age 18 resulted in postoperative issues that made it impossible for Mayer to sing in his usual way, he began formal vocal training to address the problem; this introduced him to singing in the classical tradition. He later studied philosophy, history and musicology, which prepared his trademark intellectual approach to opera characters. He then studied voice with Liselotte Hammes and Kurt Moll at the Musikhochschule Köln.

His first engagements took him to the Theater Regensburg and the Staatstheater Darmstadt. As a member of the ensemble of the Theater Basel, he portrayed the title role in Mozart's Don Giovanni and Achilles in Othmar Schoeck's Penthesilea, staged by Hans Neuenfels. At the Badisches Staatstheater Karlsruhe he performed the title role of Hindemith's Mathis der Maler, and for the first time Wotan in Wagner's Die Walküre. As a heldenbaritone with a dramatic voice suited for the Wagnerian repertoire, Mayer was in high demand. Music journalist Mischa Spel called him "one of the most sought-after Wagner singers in the world". He moved to the Hamburg State Opera in 2008, where he appeared as the Four Villains in Offenbach's Les contes d'Hoffmann, Mandryka in Arabella by Richard Strauss, Kaspar in Weber's Der Freischütz, Jochanaan in Salome by R. Strauss, Wotan in Die Walküre, the title role of Verdi's Rigoletto and Scarpia in Puccini's Tosca.

Mayer first appeared at the Bavarian State Opera in Munich in 2006 as the Father in Humperdinck's Hänsel und Gretel. He performed around 50 times at the house, showing talent for comedy as Falke in Die Fledermaus by Johann Strauss, and for serious roles such as Carlo Borromeo in Pfitzner's Palestrina and Telramund in Wagner's Lohengrin. He portrayed Mandryka in a 2015 new production staged by Andreas Dresen, alongside Anja Harteros in the title role. He appeared as Wotan in the Ring cycle in Munich, staged by Andreas Kriegenburg, and was described as an ideal Wotan: "a giant of a man, but capable of the most tender emotions, with a voice that filled the house, but flexible for the finest nuances".

Mayer appeared at La Scala in Milan in the 2007–08 season, portraying the title role of Alban Berg's Wozzeck, directed by Jürgen Flimm. The performance won him international recognition; he was engaged at the house to perform Posa for a new production of Verdi's Don Carlos in December 2008. He appeared as Wozzeck at the New National Theater in Tokyo in 2009. Mayer portrayed the title role of Verdi's Macbeth at the Cologne Opera, two roles in Alban Berg's Lulu at the 2010 Salzburg Festival, directed by Vera Nemirova and conducted by Marc Albrecht, and Wotan in a new production of Die Walküre at the Opéra National de Paris the same year. He appeared that season also as Mandryka in Tokyo, as Amfortas at La Monnaie in Brussels, as Macbeth at the Deutsche Oper Berlin in a new production directed by Robert Carsen's production, and in Die Frau ohne Schatten as Barak at the Vlaamse Opera in Antwerp and as the Messenger at the 2011 Salzburg Festival conducted by Christian Thielemann. He performed the Four Villains at the Aalto Theatre in Essen, and two roles in Lulu at the Berlin State Opera.

Mayer focused on Wagner's characters, performing at the Bayreuth Festival between 2012 and 2022. He appeared there as Telramund in the production staged by Neuenfels and conducted by Andris Nelsons, in the title role of Der fliegende Holländer, staged by Jan Philipp Gloger and conducted by Axel Kober, as Wanderer in Siegfried directed by Frank Castorf and conducted by Marek Janowski, as Amfortas staged by Uwe Eric Laufenberg and conducted by Semyon Bychkov, alongside Andreas Schager in the title role, and again as Telramund directed by Yuval Sharon and conducted by Thielemann. He finally portrayed the Holländer again in 2022, in a new production staged by Dmitri Tcherniakov and conducted by Oksana Lyniv. He appeared at the Deutsche Oper Berlin from 2009, in roles including Amfortas, Telramund, Hans Sachs in Wagner's Die Meistersinger von Nürnberg, the Vogt in Schreker's Der Schatzgräber, and in roles of the Italian repertoire including Jago in Verdi's Otello and Scarpia.

Mayer worked with conductors including Daniel Barenboim, Zubin Mehta, Kent Nagano, Simon Rattle, and Simone Young. He performed at the Vienna State Opera from 2016, as Telramund, Wotan, and Pizarro, among others. He performed there the title role of Manfred Trojahn's Orest in a 2019 new production, broadcast live on Ö1. He returned to Tokyo as Hans Sachs in the 2019–20 season, and again as Wozzeck in November 2025, his last performances. (Note: On the last three of five performances, Mayer was unable to perform, due to health-related issues.)

Mayer had multiple health problems, including two slipped discs in his back. In 2011, he had his first heart attack and adjusted his performance schedule. He died unexpectedly on 15 December 2025, at age 56.

== Awards ==
- 2021 Ambassador of Hessische Bergstraße region

== Discography ==
DVD-Video

- Schönberg, Arnold (2017), Moses und Aron, Bel Air Classiques, OCLC 994833335
- Berg, Alban (2015), Lulu, Deutsche Grammophon, OCLC 910585448
- Wagner, Richard (2014), Lohengrin, Teatro Real, OCLC 903303846
- Wagner, Richard (2013), Parsifal, Bel Air Classiques, OCLC 1033754158

CD

- Schreker, Franz (2003), Das Spielwerk und die Prinzessin, CPO, OCLC 1083870463
