= Das Spielwerk und die Prinzessin =

Opera by Franz Schreker

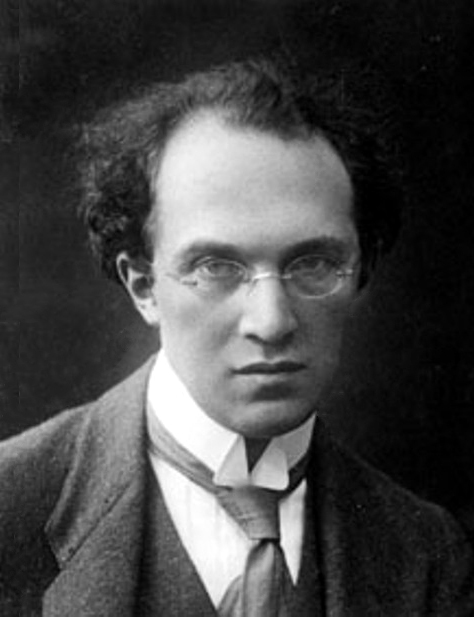
Franz Schreker, c. 1911

Das Spielwerk und die Prinzessin (The Music Box and the Princess) is an opera in two acts by Austrian composer Franz Schreker with a libretto by the composer.

== Composition history ==
The work was composed from 1909 to 1912. Schreker revised it into a one-act version entitled Das Spielwerk in 1915. Both versions are published by Universal Edition.

== Performance history ==
The original two-act version was given a simultaneous premiere in Frankfurt and Vienna on 15 March 1913. Although it failed to repeat the success of Schreker's previous opera Der ferne Klang, the Vienna production caused a scandal which only helped to make Schreker's name more widely known and consolidate his reputation as one of Vienna's foremost modernists.

The premiere of the revised one-act version took place on 30 October 1920 at the National Theater Munich conducted by Bruno Walter.

The prelude, under the title Vorspiel zur Oper 'Das Spielwerk', can be performed separately.

== Recordings ==
Das Spielwerk und die Prinzessin: Thomas Johannes Mayer, Julia Henning, Hans-Jürgen Schöpflin, Matthias Klein, Anne-Carolyn Schlüter, Hans Georg Ahrens, Bernd Gebhardt, Jörg Sabrowski, Jakob Zethner, Paul McNamara, Martin Fleitmann, Kieler Opernchor, Kinderchor Kiel, Philharmonisches Orchester Kiel, Ulrich Windfuhr 2003, Classic Production Osnabrück.
