= Grete Wiesenthal =

Austrian ballerina (1885–1970)

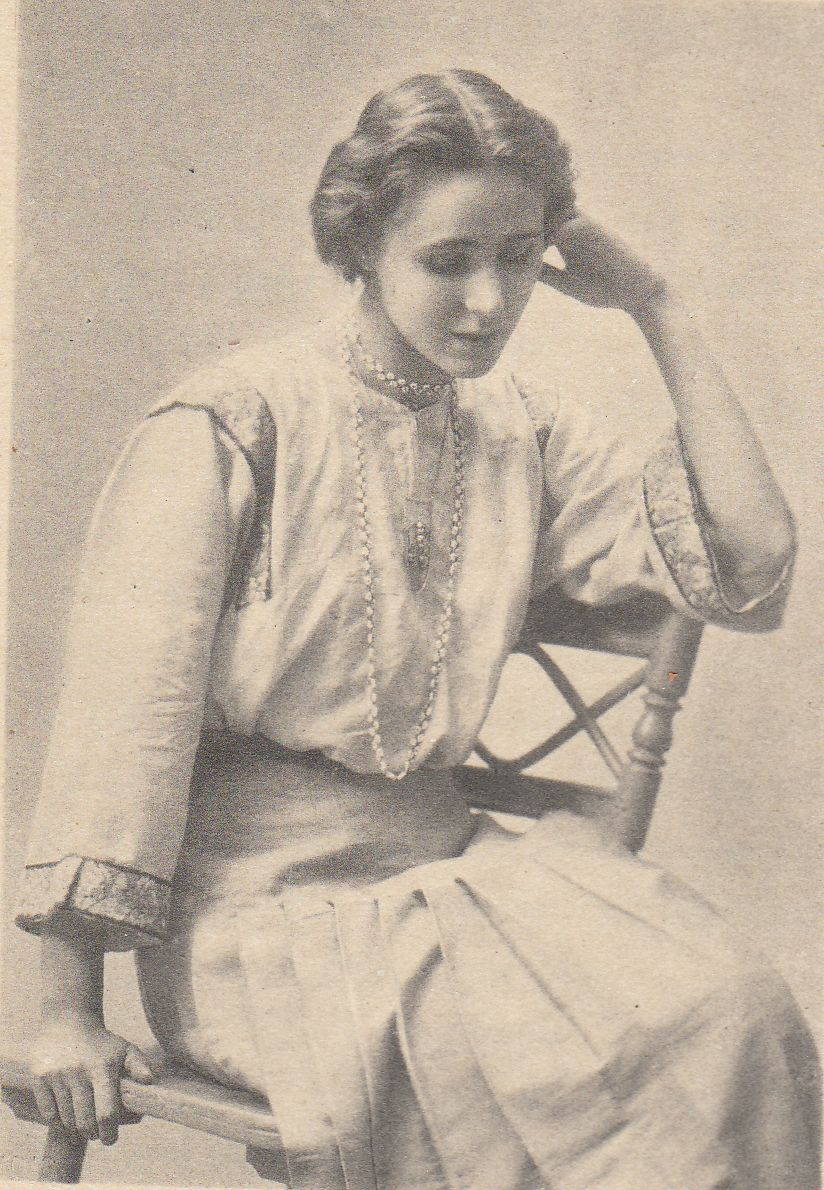
- From the time of my first dance, from her autobiography, Der Aufstieg (1919)
- Born: 9 December 1885; Vienna, Austria-Hungary
- Died: 22 June 1970 (aged 84); Vienna, Austria
- Education: Vienna State Opera
- Known for: Ecstatic modern dance
- Notable work: Choreography for The Blue Danube
- Spouse(s): Erwin Lang 1910, div. 1923; Nils Silfverskjöld 1923, div. 1927
- Relatives: Elsa (sister, danced with her)

Grete Wiesenthal (9 December 1885 – 22 June 1970) was an Austrian dancer, actor, choreographer, and dance teacher. She transformed the Viennese waltz from a staple of the ballroom into a wildly ecstatic dance. She was trained at the Vienna Court Opera, but left to develop her own more expressive approach, creating ballets to music by Franz Schreker, Clemens von Franckenstein, and Franz Salmhofer, as well as dancing in her own style to the waltzes of Johann Strauss II. She is considered a leading figure in modern dance in Austria.

== Early life ==
Grete Wiesenthal was born in Vienna on 9 December 1885, daughter of the painter Franz Wiesenthal and his wife Rosa (née Ratkovsky). She had five sisters and a brother. At the age of ten she joined the ballet school of the Court Opera in Vienna, as did her sister Elsa, and from 1901 to 1907 she worked as a dancer there. In 1907, the conductor and composer Gustav Mahler gave her the leading role of Fenella in La Muette de Portici, overriding the ballet master, Joseph Hassreiter; the resulting scandal led Mahler to resign.

== Career ==
Wiesenthal felt there was no artistry in the Court Opera, and developed her own approach to the Viennese waltz of Strauss and the waltzes of Chopin, linked to the Vienna Secession group of artists and innovators. Her dramatic and ecstatic choreography made her a leading figure in Austrian dance. Meryl Cates of The New York Times characterised her approach as "swirling, euphoric movement and suspended arches of the body". The Mahler Foundation described the effect of her choreography as "unbound hair and swinging dresses". She called her approach "spherical dance", involving turning and extending the torso, arms, and legs on a horizontal axis, unlike the more vertical rotations of her contemporaries Isadora Duncan and Ruth St Denis, who were also admired at that time in Vienna. Spinning was a core element in her dance. The cultural historian Alys X. George said that this transformation of the Viennese waltz from ballroom standard to an outdoor avant-garde art form electrified the city.

In 1908, Wiesenthal led her sisters Berta and Elsa at Vienna's Cabaret Fledermaus, the highlight being her "Danube waltzes" (Donauwalzer) solo performed to Johann Strauss II's "On the Beautiful Blue Danube". They moved to Berlin, working there until 1910 at the Deutsches Theater.

They toured both in Germany and internationally, taking their dance to Munich (Artist's Theatre, 1909) London (Hippodrome 1909), Paris (Théâtre du Vaudeville), and New York (1912, Winter Theater) where they were warmly received. She choreographed and appeared in the title role of the 1910 pantomime play Sumurun at the Berlin Kammerspiel theatre, directed by Max Reinhardt with script by Friedrich Freksa; a more elaborate production travelled to London in 1911 and New York in 1912. Critics repeatedly commented on her delicacy of movement, charm, and femininity. However the leading ballerina Jolantha Seyfried, who danced Wiesenthal's works in the late 20th century, noted that the tiny movements were less well-suited to the large stage of the Vienna State Opera.

In 1912–1914, she was the leading dancer in the three "Grete Wiesenthal Series" films, Kadra Sâfa, Erlkönigs Tochter, and Die goldne Fliege. After a pause in her career during the First World War, she opened her own school of dance in 1919.

In 1927, she took the leading role in her own ballet Der Taugenichts in Wien ("The Ne'er-Do-Well in Vienna") at the Vienna State Opera. She continued to give dance performances in Vienna and on tour. Her performances on her return to New York in 1933 however appeared dated to critics. In 1934, she became a professor at the Academy for Music and the Performing Arts in Vienna, and in 1945 she became director of artistic dance there.

Wiesenthal's dances

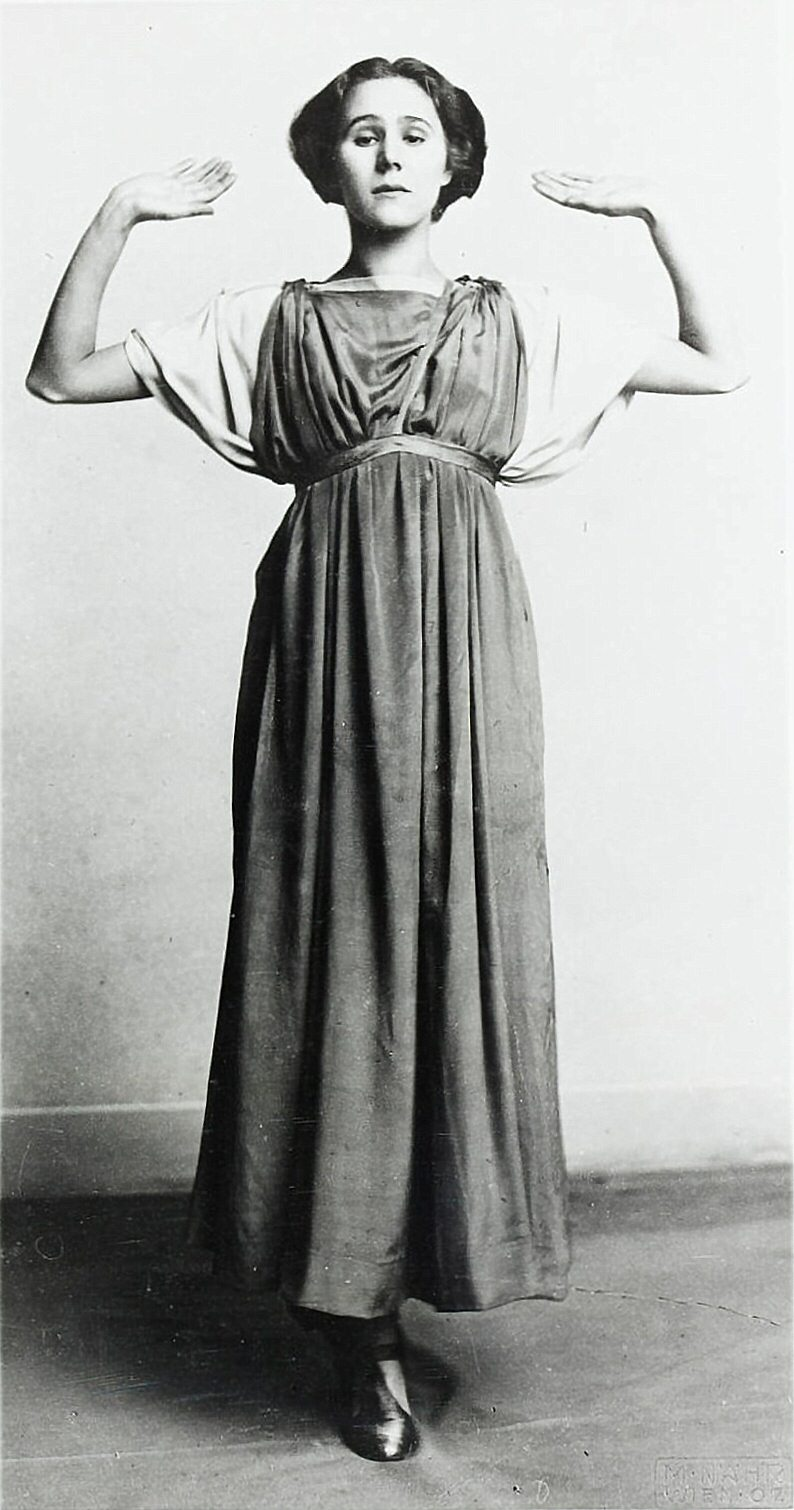
Wiesenthal dancing to Beethoven's Piano concerto in G major, by Moritz Nähr, 1906/8

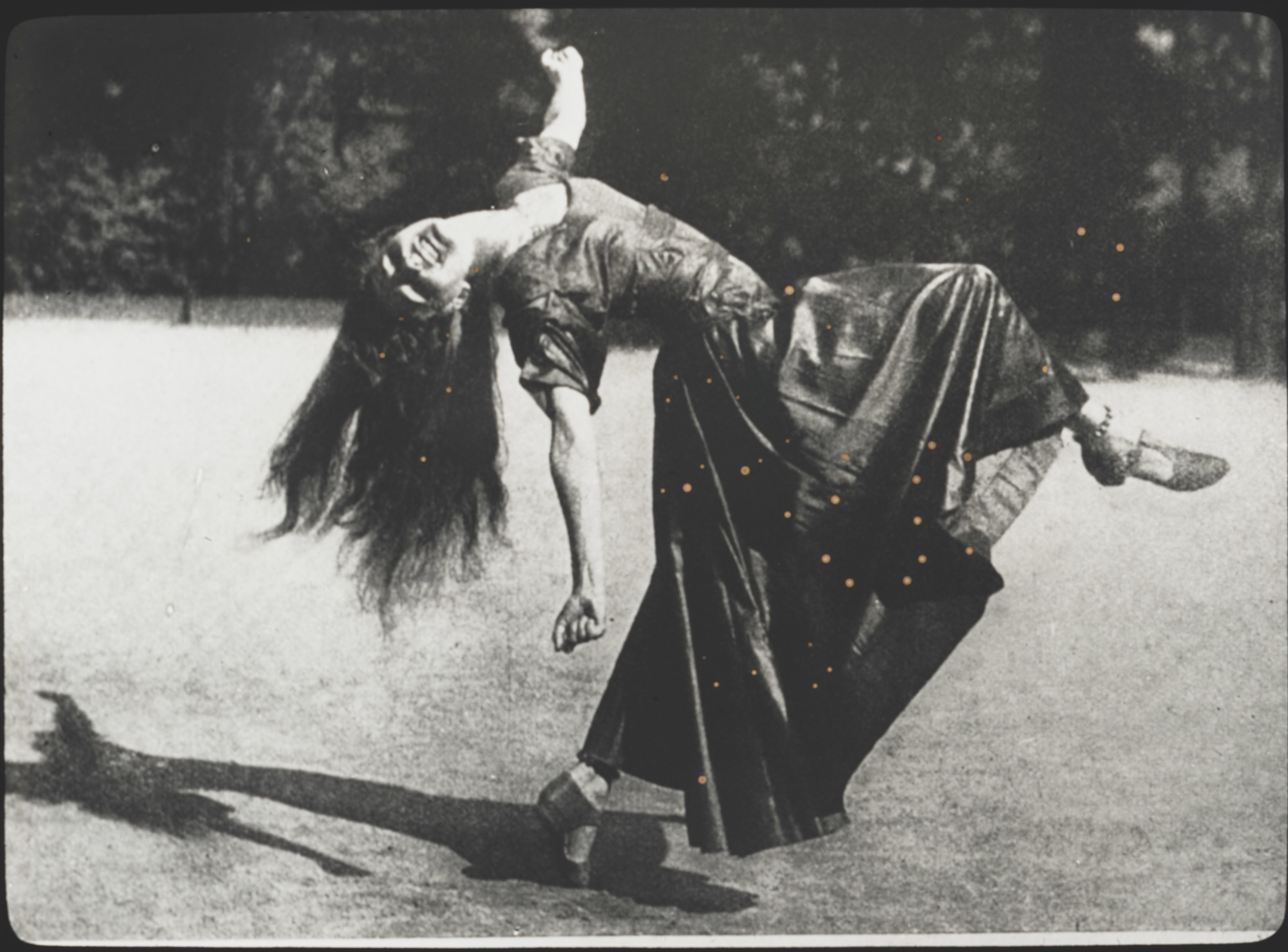
Wiesenthal's interpretation of Strauss's Danube waltzes, 1908, by Arnold Genthe

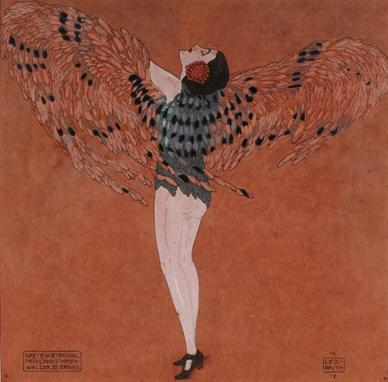
Wiesenthal dancing Johann Strauss II's Frühlingsstimmen. Hand-coloured illustration by Leo Rauth, 1910

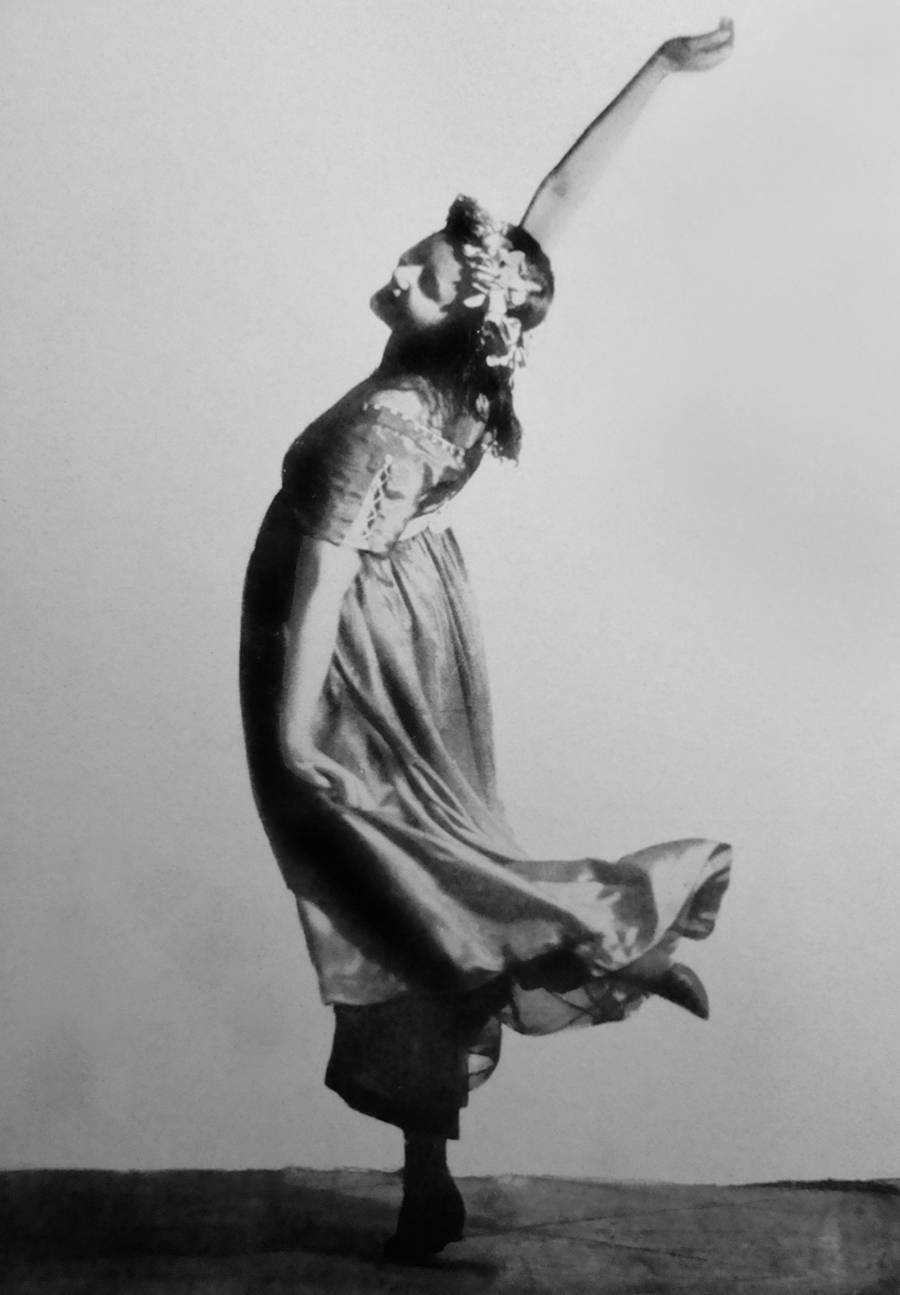
The dancer, by Hugo Erfurth, 1928

== Family life and legacy ==
Wiesenthal married Erwin Lang in June 1910, divorcing in 1923. She married the Swedish doctor Nils Silfverskjöld that same year, divorcing in 1927. She had one son, Martin. In 1938, she helped Jewish friends, including the dancer Lily Calderon-Spitz, travel to Britain to escape the Nazi persecution.

She is buried in the Central Cemetery in Vienna. She is revered in Austria as a pioneer of modern dance, where her choreography saw a late 20th century renaissance. In 2020, writing on Tanz.at, Gunhild Oberzaucher-Schüller described her dance as "ever present".

In 1981, a street in Vienna's Favoriten district was named Wiesenthalgasse after her.

== Works created ==
=== Ballet ===
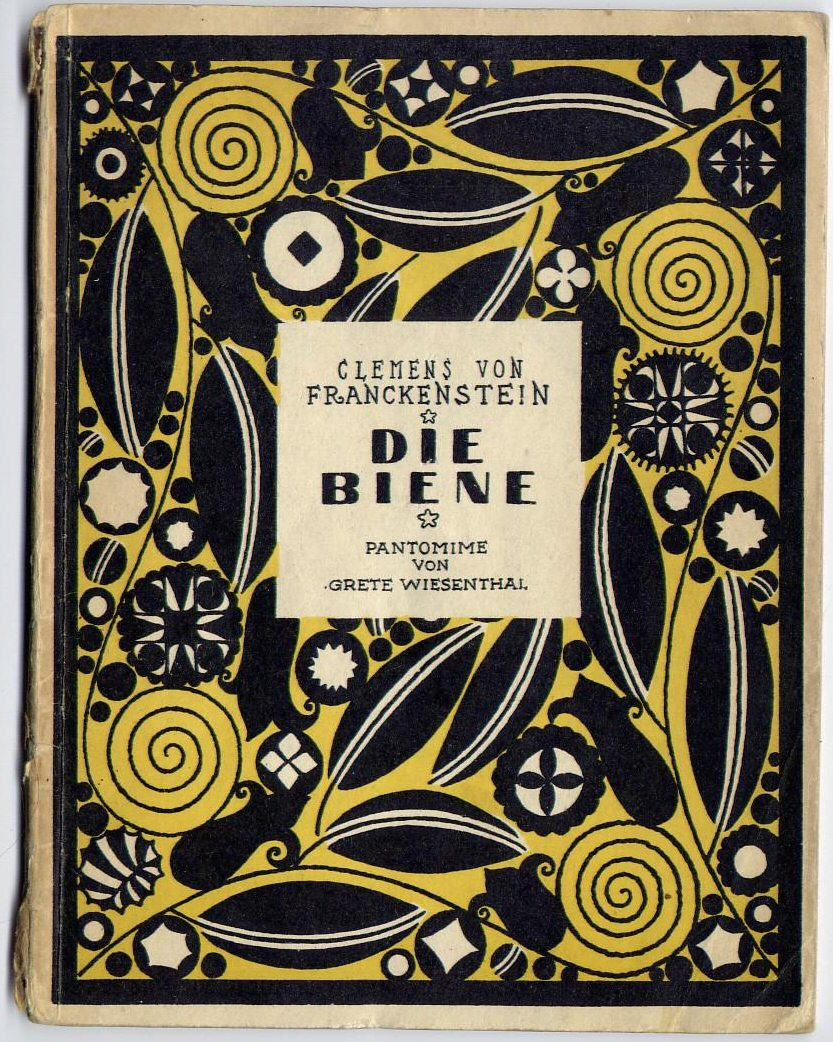
Die Biene, 1917 by Clemens von Franckenstein, music for a 'pantomime' choreographed by Wiesenthal

- 1908: Der Geburtstag der Infantin ("The Birthday of the Infanta" by Oscar Wilde; Music by Franz Schreker)
- 1916: Die Biene ("The Bee"; Music by Clemens von Franckenstein)
- 1930: Der Taugenichts in Wien ("The Ne'er-do-well in Vienna"; Music by Franz Salmhofer)

=== Books ===
- 1919: Der Aufstieg ("The Climb", Autobiography)
- 1951: Iffi: Roman einer Tänzerin ("Iffi: A Dancer's Novel")

=== Filmography ===
- 1913: Das fremde Mädchen ("The Foreign Girl")
- 1914: Die goldene Fliege ("The Golden Fly")
- 1914: Erlkönigs Tochter ("Erlkönig's Daughter")
- 1914: Kadra Sâfa ("Sheikh Kadra Sâfa")
- 1919: Der Traum des Künstlers ("The Artist's Dream")

== Sources ==
- Amort, Andrea: "Free Dance in Interwar Vienna" In: Interwar Vienna. Culture between Tradition and Modernity. Eds. Deborah Holmes and Lisa Silverman. New York, Camden House, 2009, pp. 117–142.
- Brandstetter, Gabriele and Oberzaucher-Schüller, Gunhild: Mundart der Wiener Moderne. Der Tanz der Grete Wiesenthal. Kieser, Munich, 2009.
- Fiedler, Leonhard M.; Lang, Martin. Grete Wiesenthal: die Schönheit der Sprache des Körpers im Tanz. Residenz Verlag, Salzburg and Vienna, 1985.
- Huber-Wiesenthal, Rudolf: Die Schwestern Wiesenthal. 1934.
- Kolb, Alexandra: Performing Femininity. Dance and Literature in German Modernism. Oxford: Peter Lang 2009.
- Prenner, Ingeborg: Grete Wiesenthal. Die Begründerin eines neuen Tanzstils. PhD thesis, Vienna, 1950.
- Witzmann, R. (ed.) Die neue Körpersprache, G. Wiesenthal und ihr Tanz, 18 May 1985–23 February 1986, Exhibition Catalogue, Historical Museum, Vienna, 1985.
