= Irrelohe =

Opera by Franz Schreker

- Opera by Franz Schreker
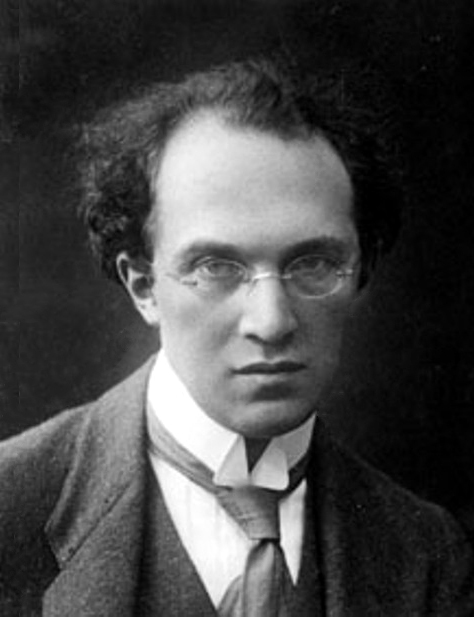
- The composer in 1912
- Librettist: Schreker
- Language: German
- Premiere: 27 March 1924; Stadttheater Köln

Irrelohe is an opera in three acts by the Austrian composer Franz Schreker, libretto by the composer.

== Composition history ==
Schreker wrote the libretto in a very short time (just a few days) in 1919. The work takes its name from a train station called Irrenlohe which Schreker passed through during a journey to Nuremberg in March 1919. Composition occupied Schreker from 1920 until 1922. The score was published in 1923 by Universal Edition Vienna.

== Performance history ==
The opera was first performed on 27 March 1924 at the Stadttheater Köln, conducted by Otto Klemperer. Productions in a further seven cities followed (including Stuttgart, Frankfurt and Leipzig), but critical response was mixed and, together with changing audience tastes and the complexity of the score, the work failed to maintain its place in the repertoire.

The first production in modern times was at the Bielefeld Opera in 1985, followed by a concert performance in Vienna in 1989. Further stagings have taken place at the Vienna Volksoper (2004), the Bonn Opera (2010), the Pfalztheater Kaiserslautern (2015) and Opéra de Lyon (2022).

== Roles ==
Role	Voice type	Premiere Cast 27 March 1924 (Conductor: Otto Klemperer)
Count Heinrich (Graf Heinrich, Herr auf Irrelohe)	tenor	
The forester (Der Förster)	bass	
Eva	soprano	
Old Lola (Die alte Lola)	mezzo-soprano	
Peter, Lola's son	baritone	
Christobald, an old fiddler	tenor	
The parson (Der Pfarrer)	bass-baritone	
The miller (Der Müller)	bass	
Fünkchen, a musician	tenor	
Strahlbusch, a musician	tenor	
Ratzekahl, a musician	bass	
Anselmus	bass-baritone	
A footman (Ein Lakai)	tenor	

== Instrumentation ==
The orchestral score requires:

- 3 flutes (all doubling piccolo), 3 oboes (3rd doubling English horn), 3 clarinets (in A/B♭, 3rd doubling clarinet in E♭), bass clarinet in B♭ (doubling basset horn in F), 2 bassoons, contrabassoon;
- 6 horns in F, 4 trumpets in C, 3 trombones, bass tuba;
- 2 sets of timpani, 3 high kettle drums, percussion (9 players, including xylophone, glockenspiel and 3 anvils), 2 harps, harpsichord, celesta, guitar, mandolin;
- strings (16 violins I, 14 violins II, 12 violas, 10 violoncellos, 8 double basses).

Additionally, an on-stage orchestra is required consisting of 2 piccolos, 2 clarinets, 6 horns, 3 trumpets, percussion, bells and organ.

== Synopsis ==
The opera is set in the village and castle of Irrelohe, during the 18th century.

=== Act 1 ===
Lola, an ageing woman, lives with her son Peter. Peter asks about the dark and sinister castle of Irrelohe which stands on a distant hill, overlooking the village. Lola tells him the story of the curse surrounding the castle which for generations has led each of its inhabitants to rape a woman and soon afterwards die insane. Peter, suspicious, wants to know the identity of his father, but Lola keeps putting the moment off. He learns the truth from Christobald, Lola’s former fiancé who has now returned. Lola was raped by the then-lord of Irrelohe during the celebrations for her own wedding thirty years ago. Peter realises he is the offspring of the rape and therefore must also be infected by the hereditary madness. He is unable to reveal the truth to his sweetheart, Eva, who is magnetically drawn to Heinrich, the current occupant of the castle.

=== Act 2 ===
The Miller, Eva’s father, tells the local Priest that his mill burned down during the night, the latest in a series of arson attacks that seem to happen at the same time every year. Fünkchen, Ratzekahl and Strahlbusch, Christobald’s accomplices, are travelling musicians who every year turn up to play at a wedding while Christobald starts a fire somewhere nearby.

Eva goes up to the castle and declares her love to Heinrich, which is returned. However, Heinrich, determined to overcome the madness within him, refuses to consummate their love until he and Eva are properly wed.

=== Act 3 ===
On the day of the wedding, Eva tries to convince Peter that their separation is for the best. Sensing the onset of the madness, Peter implores Eva not to dance at the wedding and pleads with his mother to bind him in chains. During the wedding festivities, Peter escapes from the house and attempts to force himself upon Eva but is overcome and strangled by Heinrich just as Christobald sends the castle up in flames. Heinrich is mortified by his killing of his own brother but is strengthened by Eva’s love and the pair look forward to a new and brighter future together.

== Recordings ==
- In 1995 Sony Classical released a recording made by Austrian radio ORF during a concert performance at the Vienna Musikverein on 15 March 1989, with Peter Gülke conducting the Wiener Symphoniker.
- A recording taken from live performances at the Bonn Opera in 2010 conducted by Stefan Blunier was released by Musikproduktion Dabringhaus und Grimm on SACD format in September 2011.
