= Franz Schreker =

Austrian composer (1878–1934)

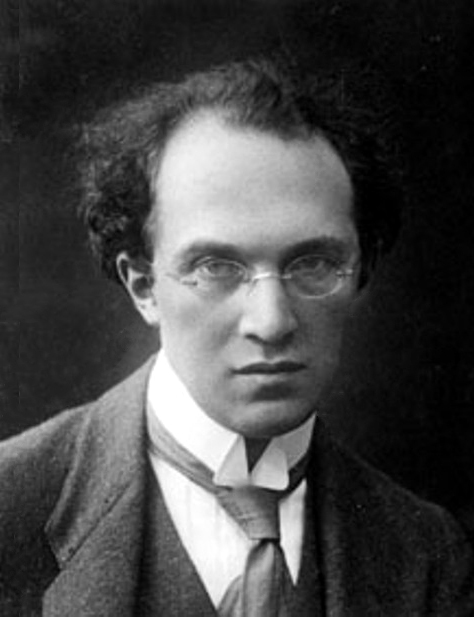
- Schreker, c. 1911
- Born: 23 March 1878; Monaco
- Died: 21 March 1934 (aged 55); Berlin, Germany
- Education: Vienna Conservatory
- Occupations: Conductor; composer; librettist; academic teacher
- Organizations: Vienna Music Academy; Hochschule für Musik in Berlin
- Relatives: Bruno Schrecker (second cousin)

Franz Schreker (originally Schrecker; 23 March 1878 – 21 March 1934) was an Austrian composer, conductor, librettist, teacher and administrator. Primarily a composer of operas, Schreker developed a style characterized by aesthetic plurality (a mixture of Romanticism, Naturalism, Symbolism, Impressionism, Expressionism and Neue Sachlichkeit), timbral experimentation, strategies of extended tonality and conception of total music theatre into the narrative of 20th-century music.

== Formative years ==
He was born as Franz Schrecker in Monaco, the eldest son of the Bohemian Jewish court photographer Ignaz Franz Schrecker (Germanized from Ignácz Furencz, originally Isak), and his wife, Eleonore von Cloßmann, who was a member of the Catholic aristocracy of Styria. He grew up during travels across half of Europe and, after the early death of his father, the family moved from Linz to Vienna (1888) where in 1892, with the help of a scholarship, Schreker entered the Vienna Conservatory. Starting with violin studies, with Sigismund Bachrich and Arnold Rosé, he moved into the composition class of Robert Fuchs, graduating as a composer in 1900. His first success was with the Intermezzo for strings, Op. 8, which won an important prize sponsored by the Neue musikalische Presse in 1901. His first opera, Flammen, was completed in 1902 but failed to receive a staged production.

== Career launch ==
Schreker had begun conducting in 1895, when he had founded the Verein der Musikfreunde Döbling. In 1907 he formed the Vienna Philharmonic Chorus, which he conducted until 1920: among its many premières were Zemlinsky's Psalm XXIII and Schoenberg's Friede auf Erden and Gurre-Lieder. Schreker and other composers, such as Schoenberg and Zemlinsky, were influential during the Jugendstil movement, which incorporated non-western styles inspired by Ancient Egypt and the Far East.

His "pantomime", Der Geburtstag der Infantin, commissioned by the dancer Grete Wiesenthal and her sister Elsa for the opening of the 1908 Kunstschau, first called attention to his development as a composer. Such was the success of the venture that Schreker composed several more dance-related works for the two sisters including Der Wind, Valse lente and Ein Tanzspiel (Rokoko).

== Success in opera ==
November 1909 saw the stormy premiere of the complex orchestral interlude (entitled Nachtstück) from Der ferne Klang, the opera he had been working on since 1903. In 1912, the first performance of the complete opera by Oper Frankfurt consolidated his fame. In the same year, director Wihelm Bopp offered Schreker a provisional teaching appointment at the Conservatory where Schreker had studied, now the Vienna Music Academy. In early 1913 he was appointed full professor. Schreker wrote his own libretti for all of his mature operas.

This breakthrough heralded a decade of great success for the composer. His next opera, Das Spielwerk und die Prinzessin, which was given simultaneous premières in Frankfurt and Vienna on 15 March 1913 was less well received (the work was subsequently revised as a one-act 'Mysterium' entitled simply Das Spielwerk in 1915), but the scandal caused by this opera in Vienna only served to make Schreker's name more widely known.

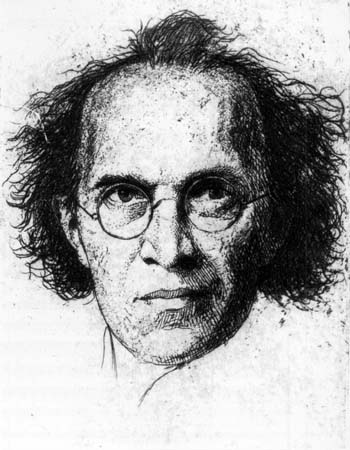
Schreker in a lithograph by Heinrich Gottselig, ca. 1922

The outbreak of World War I interrupted the composer's success but with the première of his opera Die Gezeichneten, in Frankfurt on 25 April 1918, Schreker moved to the front ranks of contemporary opera composers. The first performance of Der Schatzgräber in Frankfurt on 21 January 1920 was the high point of his career. The Chamber Symphony, composed between the two operas for the faculty of the Vienna Academy in 1916, quickly entered the repertoire and remains Schreker's most frequently performed work today.

In March 1920 he was appointed director of the Hochschule für Musik in Berlin and between 1920 and 1932 he gave extensive musical tuition in a variety of subjects with Berthold Goldschmidt, Alois Hába, Jascha Horenstein, Julius Bürger, Ernst Krenek, Artur Rodziński, Rudy Schrager, Stefan Wolpe, Zdenka Ticharich and Grete von Zieritz numbering among his students.

== End of career ==
Schreker's fame and influence were at their peak during the early years of the Weimar Republic when he was the most performed living opera composer after Richard Strauss. The decline of his artistic fortunes began with the mixed reception given to Irrelohe at the Cologne Opera in 1924 under Otto Klemperer and the failure of Der singende Teufel, given in Berlin in 1928 under Erich Kleiber.

Political developments and the spread of antisemitism were also contributory factors, both of which heralded the end of Schreker's career. Right-wing demonstrations marred the première of Der Schmied von Gent in Berlin in 1932 and National Socialist pressure forced the cancellation of the scheduled Freiburg première of Christophorus in 1933 (the work was finally performed there in 1978). Finally, in June 1932, Schreker lost his position as Director of the Musikhochschule in Berlin and, the following year, also his post as professor of composition at the Akademie der Künste.

In his lifetime he went from being hailed as the future of German opera to being considered irrelevant as a composer and marginalized as an educator. After suffering from a stroke in December 1933, he died in Berlin on 21 March 1934, two days before his 56th birthday.

Although Schreker was influenced by composers such as Richard Strauss and Richard Wagner, his mature style shows a highly individual harmonic language, which, although broadly tonal, is inflected with chromatic and polytonal passages. Schreker also took musical inspiration from his close friend Arnold Schoenberg with the use of expressionist style.

The Third Reich banned Schreker's music along with that of many other composers of Jewish origin. His early death in 1934 at the age of 55, together with the Nazi ban, prevented Schreker's music from expanding outside of German-speaking Europe.

== Reputation today ==
After decades in obscurity, Schreker has begun to enjoy a considerable revival in reputation in the German-speaking world and in the United States. In 2005 the Salzburg Festival mounted an abridged production of Die Gezeichneten, conducted by Kent Nagano (and filmed), and the Jewish Museum in Vienna presented an exhibition devoted to his life and work. New productions of Der ferne Klang were staged at the Staatsoper Unter den Linden in Berlin and the Zurich Opera in 2010, as well as in smaller opera houses in Germany. Irrelohe was performed at the Volksoper in Vienna in 2004, at the Bonn Opera in November 2010 then staged for the first time in France at the Opéra National de Lyon in March 2022. In 2010 a Schreker opera was staged in the US for the first time: Die Gezeichneten at Los Angeles Opera; and months after that came a second: Der ferne Klang during the Bard Summerscape Festival. Australian composer, pianist, and conductor David Stanhope included Scheker's Prelude to a Drama in his recording Tall Poppies TP274 David Stanhope live in concert with Sydney Symphony Orchestra: Franz Schreker Prelude to a Drama, and Rachmaninoff Symphonic Dances.

== Selected works ==
=== Operas ===
- Flammen, Op. 10 (1901/02)
- Der ferne Klang (1903–1910)
- Das Spielwerk und die Prinzessin (1908; 1909–1912); revised as Das Spielwerk (1915)
- Die Gezeichneten (1911; 1913–1915)
- Der Schatzgräber (1915–1918)
- Irrelohe (1919–1922)
- Der singende Teufel (1924; 1927–1928)
- Christophorus (oder Die Vision einer Oper) (1925–1929)
- Der Schmied von Gent (1929–1932)

=== Orchestral works ===
- 1896: Love Song for string orchestra and harp (lost)
- 1899: Scherzo (unpublished)
- 1899: Symphony in A minor, Op. 1 (unpublished, final movement lost)
- 1900: Intermezzo for string orchestra, Op. 8 (later incorporated into the Romantische Suite)
- 1900: Scherzo for string orchestra
- 1902–1903: Ekkehard: Symphonic Overture, Op. 12
- 1903: Romantische Suite, Op. 14
- 1904: Phantastische Ouvertüre, Op. 15
- 1906–1907: Nachtstück (from the opera Der ferne Klang)
- 1908–1910: Der Geburtstag der Infantin: Dance-pantomime for chamber orchestra after Oscar Wilde's The Birthday of the Infanta
- 1908: Festwalzer und Walzerintermezzo
- 1908: Valse lente
- 1908–1909: Ein Tanzspiel (Rokoko)
- 1913: Vorspiel zu einem Drama
- 1916: Chamber Symphony
- 1909/1922: Fünf Gesänge for low voice and orchestra (T: Arabian Nights, Edith Ronsperger)
- 1922: Symphonic Interlude (from the opera Der Schatzgräber)
- 1923: Der Geburtstag der Infantin: Suite for large orchestra
- 1923/1927: Vom ewigen Leben for soprano and orchestra (T: Walt Whitman)
- 1928: Kleine Suite for small orchestra
- 1929–1930: Vier kleine Stücke for large orchestra
- 1932–1933: Das Weib des Intaphernes: Melodrama for speaker and orchestra (T: Eduard Stucken)
- 1933: Hungarian Rhapsody No. 2 (Liszt) – transcribed for orchestra
- 1933: Vorspiel zu einer großen Oper "Memnon"

=== Choral music ===
- 1900: Psalm 116 for 3-part women's chorus, orchestra and organ, Op. 6
- 1902: Schwanensang for mixed choir and orchestra, Op. 11 (T: Dora Leen)

=== Chamber music ===
- 1898: Sonata for violin and piano
- 1909: Der Wind for clarinet, horn, violin, 'cello and piano

Principal publisher: Universal Edition
