= Der Sprung über den Schatten =

Opera by Ernst Krenek

- Opera by Ernst Krenek
- Librettist: Krenek
- Language: German
- Premiere: 9 June 1924; Frankfurt Opera

Der Sprung über den Schatten is a 1924 opera by Ernst Krenek. The work parodied expressionism and psychoanalysis, and prefigured Jonny spielt auf in including jazz elements.

== Cast ==
- Prince Kuno, reigning prince (bass)
- Princess Leonore, his wife (soprano)
- Countess Blandine, her chambermaid (mezzo-soprano)
- Odette, her maid (soprano)
- Dr. Berg, hypnotist (baritone)
- Marcus, private investigator (tenor)
- Laurenz Goldhaar, a poet (tenor)
- A chamberlain of the prince (tenor)
- A cavalier (tenor)
- Captain of the castle watch (bass)
- Four judges (2 tenors, 2 basses)
- One of the crowd (tenor)
- A waiter (speaking role)
- A chamberlain, an advocate (silent roles)

== Recording ==
- 1989 Kuno: Thomas Brüning, Prinzessin Leonore: Lynda Kemeny, Comtesse Blandine: Susan McLean, Odette: Diana Amos, Dr. Berg: John Pflieger, Marcus: Ulrich Neuweiler, Laurenz Goldhaar: Jörg Dürmüller; Bielefeld, de David de Villiers CPO
