= Der singende Teufel =

Opera by Franz Schreker

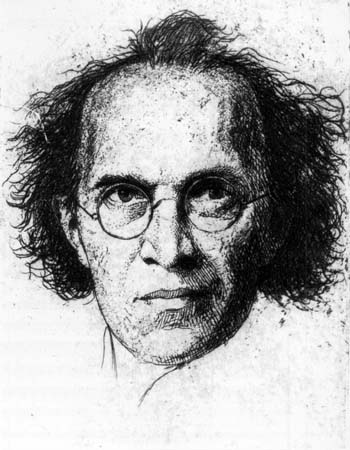
Franz Schreker in a lithograph by Heinrich Gottselig, ca. 1922

Der singende Teufel is an opera in four acts by Franz Schreker with a German-language libretto by the composer.

== Composition history ==
The work was composed during 1927–28 to a libretto written in 1924. Originally entitled Die Orgel, according to Schreker biographer Christopher Hailey, the libretto was probably influenced by a short story by Heinrich von Kleist entitled Die heilige Caecilie oder die Gewalt der Musik: Eine Legende which had been reprinted a year earlier in a volume that also included an article on Schreker's music by the critic Eugen Thari.

The opera is published by Universal Edition.

== Performance history ==
The opera was first performed in Berlin at the Staatsoper Unter den Linden on 10 December 1928 conducted by Erich Kleiber with Delia Reinhardt and Fritz Wolff in the leading roles. Despite generally favourable audience reaction, the production was not a critical success. Other theatres, including Breslau, Prague, Munich and Frankfurt, abandoned their plans to stage the work and only two further productions took place during the composer's lifetime: in Wiesbaden (1929) and Stettin (1930).

The composer conducted excerpts from the work in a concert with the Wiener Sinfonie-Orchester in May 1929.

The first production in modern times was at the Bielefeld Opera in 1989. In October 2021, a new staging was announced at Theater Bonn for the 2022–23 season.

== Synopsis ==
The action takes place in the Germany of the Middle Ages.

Act I

Amandus Herz, a young organ-builder, has built a small pipe-organ. The priest Father Kaleidos, a religious zealot, seizes the opportunity to ask Amandus to complete the construction of the great organ begun by his father. Amandus, however, is horrified by the fact that his father went insane trying to complete the instrument and asks for time to consider.

The pagans are looking for the most beautiful virgin for their springtime rituals. Lilian is appointed to be given to the man who can lead them against the Christians. Lilian, who is in love with Amandus, tries to persuade him to assume the role of leader, but Amandus, now firmly committed to the Christian cause, declines.

Act II

Amandus is tormented by his inability to complete the organ begun by his father and rejects Kaleidos's encouragement. At night, the pagan priestess Alardis and her followers perform a ritual, mocking the Christian message. Amandus goes outside in the hope of persuading Lilian to turn her back on the heathen festivities but the drunken knight Sinbrand, who desires Lilian, challenges him to a duel. When Amandus refuses to fight, he is tied up by Sinbrand's followers and Sinbrand abducts Lilian. Kaleidos comes to free Amandus and takes him back to the security of the monastery.

Act III

Amandus, now a monk, has successfully completed the organ. But the militant Kaleidos sees the instrument as a way of imposing Christianity on the pagans. Lilian warns of an impending attack. Amandus rallies the monks and envisions the organ's beautiful tones as pacifying the pagan horde and uniting the warring factions. His plan at first seems to be fulfilled: at the sound of the organ, the invaders drop their weapons and fall to their knees. However, their disarmament complete, Kaleidos orders the now-defenceless pagans to be slaughtered.

Act IV

In the woods some weeks later, a broken Amandus recovers under Lilian's care. A pilgrim visits him wanting help repairing a small organ, but as soon as Amandus sees the instrument, it only reminds him of his own fatal failure. Lilian, in a bid to end his suffering, sets fire to the monastery. In the process, the burning organ at last begins to produce heavenly sounds. Amandus undergoes a complete transformation. Knowing that she has finally broken the spell, Lilian falls lifeless to the ground.

== Instrumentation ==
- 2 flutes, piccolo (doubling flute 3), 2 oboes, cor anglais, 2 clarinets in B♭/A, bass clarinet, 2 bassoons, contrabassoon (doubling bassoon 3)
- 4 horns, 3 trumpets, 3 trombones, tuba
- timpani, percussion, harp, celesta (ad lib.)
- strings

offstage: 2 flutes (doubling piccolos), E♭ clarinet, bassoon, 2 horns, trumpet, tuba, percussion, organ, regal, bells

== Recordings ==
An excerpt from the Bielefeld production was issued on the CD accompanying the book Franz Schreker: Grenzgänge, Grenzklänge (Hailey and Haas; Mandelbaum, 2004).
