= 1994 Nobel Prize in Literature =

- Kenzaburō Ōe
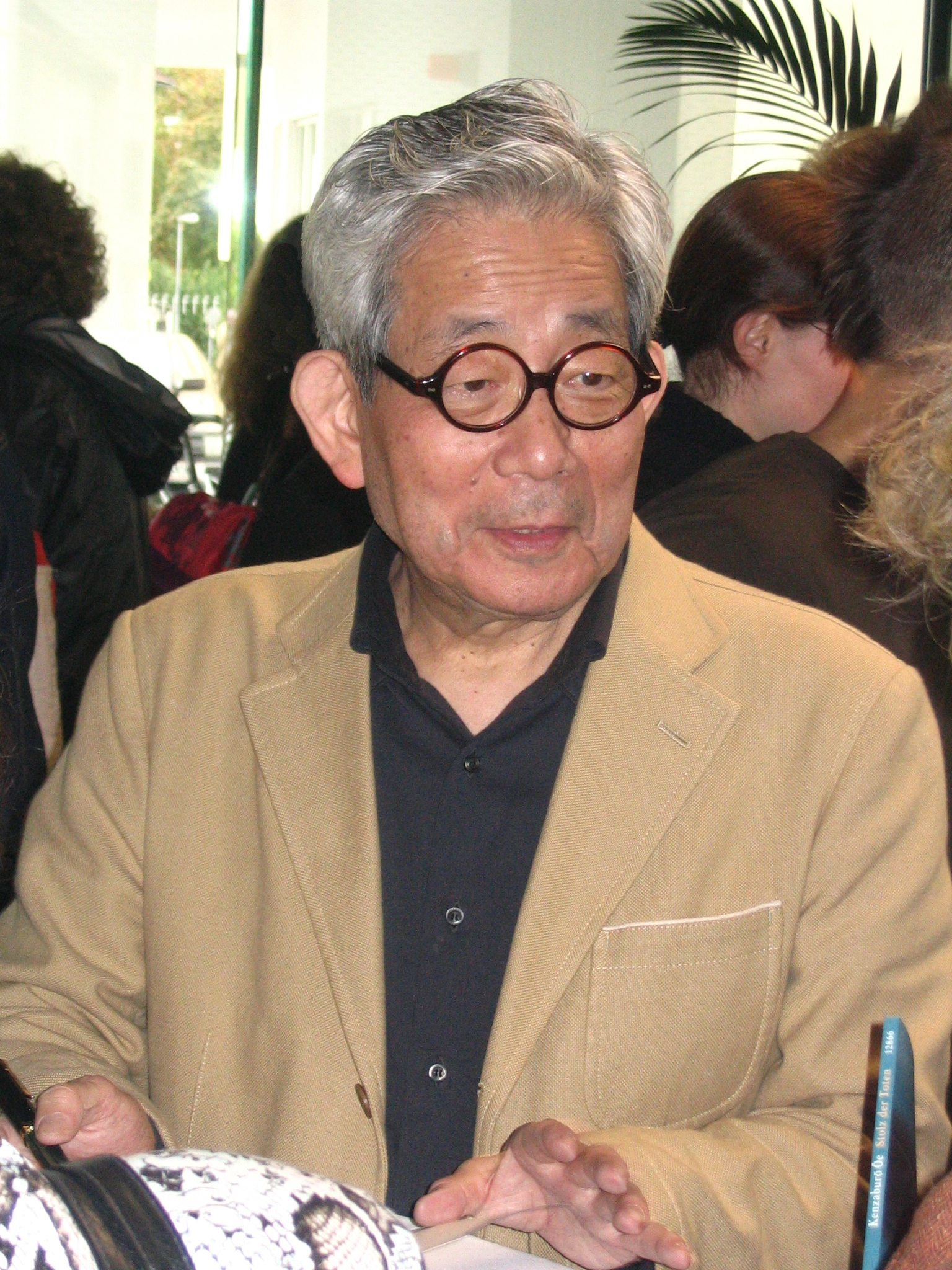
- "who with poetic force creates an imagined world, where life and myth condense to form a disconcerting picture of the human predicament today."
- Date: 13 October 1994 (announcement); 10 December 1994 (ceremony)
- Location: Stockholm, Sweden
- Presented by: Swedish Academy
- First award: 1901
- Website: Official website

The 1994 Nobel Prize in Literature was awarded to the Japanese novelist Kenzaburō Ōe (1935–2023) "who with poetic force creates an imagined world, where life and myth condense to form a disconcerting picture of the human predicament today." He is the second Japanese Nobel laureate in Literature after Yasunari Kawabata was awarded in 1968.

== Laureate ==
Kenzaburō Ōe's novels about the impact of World War II on Japan include Memushiri kouchi ("Nip the Buds, Shoot the Kids", 1958) and Hiroshima nōto ("Hiroshima Notes", 1965). His short stories and essays include Seiteki ningen ("The Sexual Man", 1963) and Kōzui wa waga tamashii ni oyobi ("The Flood Invades My Spirit" 1973). The essay Okinawa nōto ("Okinawa Notes", 1970) led to a lawsuit by two military officers. To his son, Hikari Ōe, a noted Japanese composer and musician, did he dedicate his famous Sora no kaibutsu Aguī ("Aghwee the Sky Monster", 1964) and Kojinteki na taiken ("A Personal Matter", 1964).

== Pre-announcement speculations ==
Favourites to win the 1994 Nobel Prize in Literature were Belgian author Hugo Claus and the Portuguese novelists Antonio Lobo Antunes and José Saramago (awarded in 1998). Other possible candidates speculated about included Irish poet Seamus Heaney (awarded in 1995), Polish poet Wislawa Szymborska (awarded in 1996), Trinidad-born V. S. Naipaul (awarded in 2001), Estonian Jaan Kross, Dutch Cees Nooteboom, Swedish poet Tomas Tranströmer (awarded in 2011), Chinese poet Bei Dao, Russian poet Gennadij Ajgi, and the chosen winner Kenzaburo Oe.

== Reactions ==
Although Oe had been mentioned as a potential candidate for the prize in recent years, he was little known in the English-speaking world and few of his books were available in English translation. Oe himself described his reaction on receiving the call from the Swedish Academy that he had been awarded the prize as "a total surprise".

== Nobel lecture ==
Ōe's Nobel lecture on 7 December 1994 entitled Aimai na Nihon no watashi ("Japan, the Ambiguous and Myself") began with a commentary on his life as a child and how he was fascinated by The Adventures of Huckleberry Finn and The Wonderful Adventures of Nils, which he used to take his mind off from the terror of World War II. He described surviving various hardships by using writing as an escape, "representing these sufferings of mine in the form of the novel," and how his son Hikari similarly uses music as a method of expressing "the voice of a crying and dark soul."

Ōe dedicated a large portion of his speech to his opinion of Yasunari Kawabata's acceptance speech, saying that the vagueness of Kawabata's title ("Japan, the Beautiful and Myself") and his discussions of the poems written by medieval Zen monks were the inspiration for the title of his acceptance speech. Ōe, however, stated that rather than feeling spiritual affinity with his compatriot Kawabata, he felt more affinity with the Irish poet, William Butler Yeats, whose poetry had a significant effect on his writings and his life, even being a major inspiration for his trilogy, A Flaming Green Tree and the source of its title. Ōe stated, "Yeats is the writer in whose wake I would like to follow." He mentioned that based on his experiences of Japan, he cannot utter in unison with Kawabata the phrase "Japan, the Beautiful and Myself". Ōe also discussed the revival of militaristic feelings in Japan and the necessity for rejecting these feelings, and how Ōe desired to be of use in a cure and reconciliation of mankind.

== Award ceremony ==
At the award ceremony in Stockholm on 10 December 1994, Kjell Espmark of the Swedish Academy said:

In Oe’s work, we are dealing with more than persistent leitmotifs. The books re-echo and vary each other in a great ingenious project. Here, if ever, it is justifiable to talk about a writer who is not writing books but “building” an œuvre (...)

Oe himself has described his writing as a way of exorcising his demons. Hopefully, he will never succeed. But from his incessant wrestling with these risky beings derives an œuvre which succeeds in another way – in escaping the bounds of the author’s intentions. Oe has declared that he addresses only his Japanese readers, without glancing at his worldwide audience. But there is in his “grotesque realism” a powerful poetry which communicates across the boundaries of languages and cultures, a poetry full of fresh observations and concise images. The furious persistence, as well, with which he returns to his motifs erases these barriers: eventually we become familiar with his figures, marvel at their transformations, and are enticed into sharing the author’s view that no truth, no picture is valid once and for all. Validity exists on another level. Out of this multitude of people and events in ever-changing shapes there rises in the end the vision of a genuine humanist, a poignant picture of that which concerns us all.
