= The Silent Cry =

1967 novel by Kenzaburō Ōe

- 1998 UK edition
- Author: Kenzaburō Ōe
- Original title: 万延元年のフットボール
- Language: Japanese
- Genre: Novel; Family saga Historical fiction
- Set in: Japan
- Publisher: Kodansha
- Publication date: September 1967
- Publication place: Japan
- Media type: Print
- Pages: 394
- Awards: Tanizaki Prize
- ISBN: 4061121820
- Dewey Decimal: 895.635
- LC Class: PL858 .E14 .M313
- Preceded by: Hiroshima Notes
- Followed by: The Day He Himself Shall Wipe My Tears Away
- Website: oe.l.u-tokyo.ac.jp/etop

The Silent Cry (Japanese: 万延元年のフットボール, romanized: Man'en gannen no futtoboru, lit. 'Football in the first year of Man'en') is a novel by Japanese author Kenzaburō Ōe, first published in Japanese in 1967 and awarded the Tanizaki Prize that year.

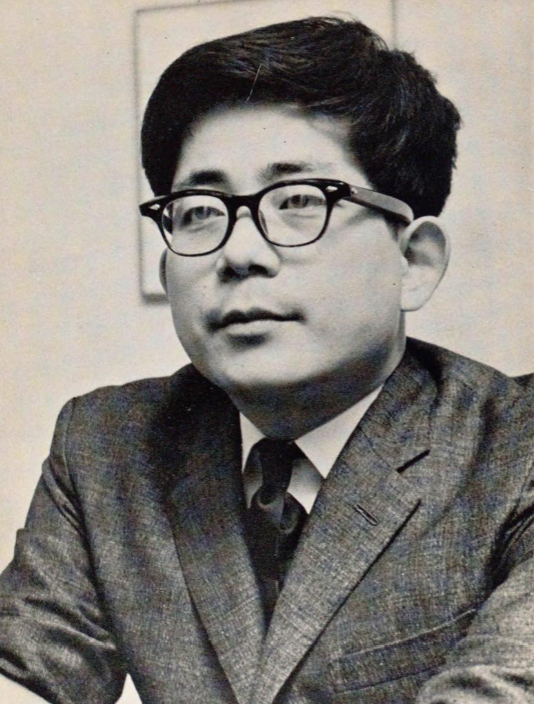
Ōe in 1962

It was serialised in the magazine Gunzō in January–July 1967, and then published as a novel by Kodansha in September of that year.

== Plot ==
The novel tells the story of two brothers in the early 1960s: Mitsusaburo, the narrator, a one-eyed, married English professor in Tokyo; and his younger brother Takashi, who has just returned from the US. Mitsusaburo and his wife Natsumi have been through a series of crises. They left their physically and mentally handicapped baby in an institution, while Mitsusaburo's friend committed suicide (he painted his head crimson, inserted a cucumber in his anus and hanged himself). Natsumi has become an alcoholic. Mitsusaburo leaves his job and they all travel to the brothers' home village, set in a hollow in the forest on Shikoku.

The brothers' family had been one of the leading families in the village. Takashi is obsessed with the memory of their great-grandfather's younger brother, who led a peasant revolt in 1860. Mitsusaburo remembers the affair differently, believing that the leader of the rebellion betrayed his followers. They similarly disagree over the death of their older brother, S, who was killed in a raid on the Korean settlement near the village. Takashi revels in his warrior's death, while Mitsusaburo recalls him as volunteering to be killed in retaliation for the death of a Korean in an earlier raid. Their sister, who was intellectually disabled, had committed suicide while living with Takashi.

Takashi has agreed to sell the family's kura-yashiki — a traditional residence-storehouse — to 'the Emperor', a Korean originally brought to the village as a slave-worker but who has now gained a position of economic dominance, turning the village's other kura-yashiki into a supermarket which has put the smaller shops out of business. Secretly, he has also agreed to sell the Emperor all the family's land.

Takashi begins to organise the youths of the village into a group, beginning with football training. When Mitsusaburo discovers Takashi's deception, he isolates himself from the others, but his wife sides with Takashi. Mitsusaburo goes to live in the kura-yashiki, while Takashi moves his group into the family's main building.

Takashi uses his group to begin an uprising against the Emperor, looting the supermarket and distributing the goods among the people. Takashi also begins a sexual relationship with Natsumi and sends one of his followers to tell Mitsusaburo. The people eventually become disenchanted, however; eventually a girl is killed. Takashi claims that he tried to rape her and then murdered her. He is abandoned by his group and waits for the villagers to come and lynch or arrest him. Mitsusaburo, however, does not believe his story and says that Takashi is using the girl's accidental death as a way to engineer his own violent death. Takashi admits to Mitsusaburo that their sister killed herself after he ended an incestuous relationship with her. After Mitsusaburo scorns Takashi's belief that he will be killed, Takashi shoots himself, writing as a final statement, 'I told the truth'.

The Emperor comes and begins demolishing the kura-yashiki. A secret basement is discovered in which the brother of the great-grandfather had spent the rest of his life hiding after the failure of his rebellion. Mitsusaburo and Natsumi decide to try to live together again, along with their handicapped baby and Takashi's unborn child, which Natsumi is carrying. Mitsusaburo decides against a return to his old job, instead taking up an offer to work as a translator with a wildlife expedition to Africa.

== Literary significance & criticism ==
The Japanese title connects the date of the rebellion (1860, the first year of the Man'en era, and also the year of Japan's first embassy to the US) with the American influence on Japan represented by the Japan-US Mutual Security Treaty of 1960 and by the (American) football with which Takashi begins his own uprising. Ōe in a later essay compared the imagination of the writer to a clamp connecting the horizontal narrative with the vertical relationship between the two eras. Ōe also drew a parallel between the back and forth motion of the football being passed and the reciprocal relationship between the stories of the two eras. Michiko Wilson extends the comparison to the thesis-antithesis relationships between the violent and penitential sides of Takashi's character and between the passive, intellectual Mitsusaburo and the active Takashi who is in touch with nature.

Susan Napier emphasises the mythical aspect of the story in her study of the novel. Like many of his earlier works, The Silent Cry has an unreal Arcadian setting, cut off from the rest of Japan and populated with grotesque characters. She argues that the climax of the book, Takashi's suicide, cannot be explained merely as prompted by his guilt over his relations with his sister. Rather, his death is a sacrifice necessary, in terms of the myth, for the redemption of Mitsusaburo and of the village; his incestuous relationship is merely a pretext for the sacrifice.

The Silent Cry is widely seen as a key work in Ōe's oeuvre. It is the only novel (other than The Game of Contemporaneity) to which Wilson devotes a whole chapter in her survey of Ōe's works, while Napier sees it as a turning point in his output between his smaller-scale early works and the broader canvases of the later novels. As such it is, "perhaps his most successful effort to encapsulate Japanese history, society, and politics within a single tight narrative". The novel also marks an end to Ōe's series of works depicting pairs of brothers in pastoral settings, a hiatus which lasted until 1980's The Trial of 'Nip the Buds, Shoot the Kids'.
