= Ariadne auf Naxos discography =

This is a list of recordings of Ariadne auf Naxos, an opera by Richard Strauss with a German-language libretto by Hugo von Hofmannsthal. The work was first performed at the Hoftheater in Stuttgart on 25 October 1912. A radically revised version was performed in at the Hofoper in Vienna on 4 October 1916. (All the recordings listed on this page are of the revised version.) This list is incomplete.

== Recordings ==
| Year | Cast (Ariadne, Composer, Zerbinetta Bacchus, Music master) | Conductor, Opera house and orchestra | Label |
|---|---|---|---|
| 1935 | Viorica Ursuleac; Erna Berger; Helge Rosvaenge | Clemens Krauss; Berlin Radio Symphony Orchestra (recorded on 11 June) | CD: Pristine Audio; Cat: PACO 021 (Opera only) |
| 1944 | Maria Reining; Irmgard Seefried; Alda Noni; Max Lorenz; Paul Schöffler | Karl Böhm; Vienna State Opera orchestra (recorded on 11 June) | CD: Myto Historical; Cat: 00163 |
| 1954 | Hilde Zadek; Sena Jurinac; Rita Streich; Hans Hopf; Alfred Poell | Joseph Keilberth; WDR Symphony Orchestra Cologne (recorded on 18 May) | CD: Capriccio; Cat: C67166-67 |
| | Elisabeth Schwarzkopf; Irmgard Seefried; Rita Streich; Rudolf Schock; Karl Dönch | Herbert von Karajan; Philharmonia Orchestra (recorded at Kingsway Hall on 30 June and 1–7 July) | CD: Naxos; Cat: 8.111033-34 |
| | Lisa Della Casa; Irmgard Seefried; Hilde Güden; Rudolf Schock; Paul Schöffler | Karl Böhm; Vienna Philharmonic (recording at Salzburg Festival on 7 August) | CD: Deutsche Grammophon; Cat: 445 332-2 |
| 1958 | Leonie Rysanek; Sena Jurinac; Roberta Peters; Jan Peerce; Walter Berry | Erich Leinsdorf; Vienna Philharmonic | CD: Decca; Cat: 443 675-2 |
| 1965 | Hildegard Hillebrecht; Sena Jurinac; Reri Grist; Jess Thomas; Paul Schöffler | Karl Böhm, Vienna Philharmonic (recorded at Salzburg Festival on 21 August) | DVD: ORF, TDK; Cat: |
| 1968 | Gundula Janowitz; Sylvia Geszty; Teresa Zylis-Gara; James King; Theo Adam | Rudolf Kempe; Staatskapelle Dresden | LP: ETERNA; Cat: 8 26 009-11 |
| 1969 | Hildegard Hillebrecht; Tatiana Troyanos; Reri Grist; Jess Thomas; Dietrich Fischer-Dieskau | Karl Böhm; Bavarian Radio Symphony Orchestra | CD: Deutsche Grammophon; Cat: 463 544-2 |
| 1976 | Montserrat Caballé; Tatiana Troyanos; Ruth Welting; Alberto Remedios; William Dooley | James Levine; Metropolitan Opera orchestra (recorded on 20 March) | CD: Celestial Audio; Cat: CA 389 |
| 1977 | Leontyne Price, Tatiana Troyanos; Edita Gruberova; René Kollo; Walter Berry | Georg Solti; London Philharmonic Orchestra | CD: Decca; Cat: 1992-05-12 |
| 1986 | Anna Tomowa-Sintow, Agnes Baltsa; Kathleen Battle; Gary Lakes; Hermann Prey | James Levine; Vienna Philharmonic | CD: Deutsche Grammophon; Cat: 453 122-2 |
| 1988 | Jessye Norman, Tatiana Troyanos; Kathleen Battle; James King; Franz Ferdinand Nentwig | James Levine; Metropolitan Opera orchestra | DVD: Deutsche Grammophon; Cat: 073 028-9 |
| | Jessye Norman, Julia Varady; Edita Gruberova; Paul Frey; Dietrich Fischer-Dieskau | Kurt Masur; Gewandhaus orchestra | CD: Phillip; Cat: |
| 2000 | Deborah Voigt; Anne Sofie von Otter; Natalie Dessay; Ben Heppner; Albert Dohmen | Giuseppe Sinopoli; Staatskapelle Dresden | CD: Deutsche Grammophon; Cat: 471 323-2; CD: Brilliant Classics; Cat: 9084 |
| 2003 | Deborah Voigt; Susanne Mentzer; Natalie Dessay; Richard Margison; Wolfgang Brendel | James Levine; Metropolitan Opera orchestra (telecast of 3 April; also recorded on 28 and 31 March) | DVD: Virgin Classics; Cat: VCL 418679 |
| 2008 | Adrianne Pieczonka; Daniela Sindram; Diana Damrau; Burkhard Fritz; Martin Gantner | Kent Nagano; Bayerisches Staatsorchester (recorded at Prinzregententheater in July) | CD: Premiere Opera; Cat: |
| 2010 | Christine Brewer; Alice Coote; Gillian Keith; Robert Dean Smith; Alan Opie | Richard Armstrong; Scottish Chamber Orchestra (sung in English) | CD: Chandos Digital; Cat: CHAN 3168 |
