= Die Gezeichneten =

Opera by Franz Schreker

- Opera by Franz Schreker
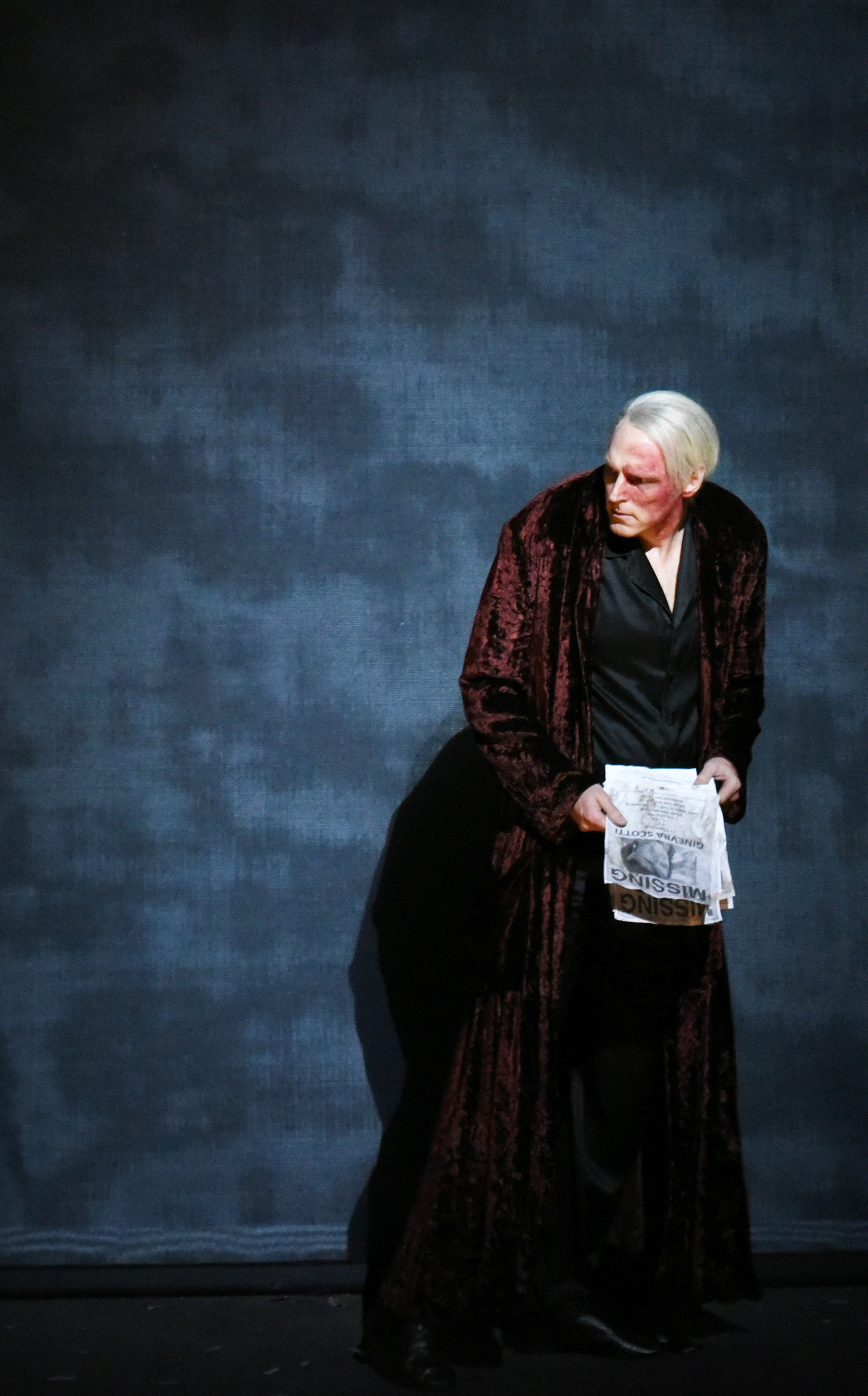
- A production at the Opéra National de Lyon, 2015 (with Charles Workman, tenor)
- Librettist: Schreker
- Language: German
- Based on: Hidalla by Frank Wedekind
- Premiere: 25 April 1918; Opernhaus Frankfurt

Die Gezeichneten (The Branded or The Stigmatized) is an opera in three acts by Franz Schreker with a German-language libretto by the composer, based on Frank Wedekind's play Hidalla.

== Composition history ==
Schreker wrote the libretto in 1911 at the request of composer Alexander Zemlinsky based on the 1904 play Hidalla by German playwright Frank Wedekind. However, Schreker decided to set the text himself, and completed the opera in 1915. The score was first published by Universal Edition Vienna.

== Performance history ==
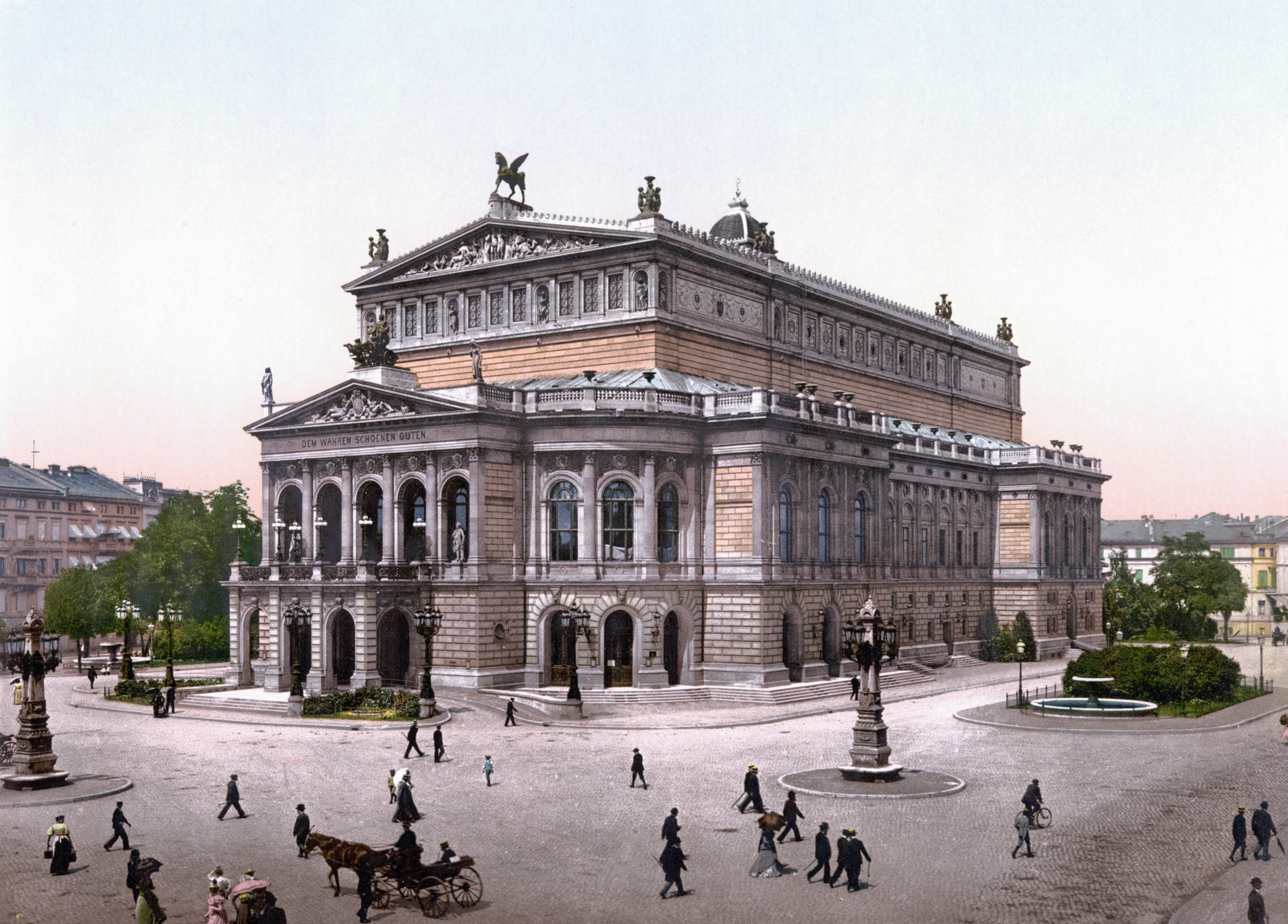
The Frankfurt Opera House c. 1900

An expanded concert version of the overture to the opera, entitled "Vorspiel zu einem Drama", was performed at the Vienna Musikverein on 8 February 1914 by the Vienna Philharmonic, conducted by Felix Weingartner.

The complete opera was first performed on 25 April 1918 by the Oper Frankfurt, conducted by Ludwig Rottenberg. It established Schreker as the pre-eminent opera composer of his generation and won him the support of Germany's foremost music critic Paul Bekker. Before the composer's music was banned in 1933, due to his Jewish ancestry, a further two dozen productions followed in fifteen cities in Germany and Austria. The playbill of the first performance in Vienna, in January 1920, mentions 66 previous performances of the opera in five opera houses (Frankfurt, Nuremberg, Munich, Dresden and Breslau).

Conductor Michael Gielen revived the opera at the Oper Frankfurt in 1979. In the performance, which was recorded, William Cochran appeared as Alviano Salvago, Barry Mora as Tamare, June Card as Carlotta, and Günter Reich as the Duke. It was staged, albeit heavily cut, at the Salzburg Festival in 2005, directed by Nikolaus Lehnhoff and conducted by Kent Nagano, with Robert Brubaker (Alviano) and Anne Schwanewilms (Carlotta) in the leading roles.

The American premiere was staged by Los Angeles Opera on 10 April 2010, followed by three more performances. James Conlon conducted. Robert Brubaker (Alviano), Anja Kampe (Carlotta) and Martin Gantner (Tamare) sang the principal roles. These performances were hailed by critics as the first-ever performance of a Schreker opera in the Western Hemisphere.

Back in Europe, the same month, Die Gezeichneten received six performances at the Teatro Massimo in Palermo in a production by Graham Vick. The French premiere took place in March 2015, at the Opéra de Lyon in a production by David Bösch. It was conducted by Alejo Pérez. The opera returned to Munich in a new production at Bavarian State Opera in July 2017 as part of the Munich Opera Festival. Krzysztof Warlikowski directed, Ingo Metzmacher conducted.

== Roles ==
Roles, voice types, premier cast
Role	Voice type	Premiere cast, 25 April 1918 (Conductor: Ludwig Rottenberg)
Duke Antoniotto Adorno	bass	Walter Schneider
Count Vitelozzo Tamare	baritone	Robert vom Scheidt
Lodovico Nardi, Podestà	bass	Willy Roos
Carlotta Nardi, his daughter	soprano	Else Gentner-Fischer
Alviano Salvago, a Genoan nobleman	tenor	Karl Ziegler
Guidobald Usodimare, a Genoan nobleman	tenor	Hermann Schramm
Menaldo Negroni, a Genoan nobleman	tenor	Erik Wirl
Michelotto Cibo, a Genoan nobleman	baritone	Rudolf Brinkmann
Gonsalvo Fieschi, a Genoan nobleman	baritone	Fritz Meurs
Julian Pinelli, a Genoan nobleman	bass	Josef Gareis
Paolo Calvi, a Genoan nobleman	bass	Josef Gareis
Capitaneo di Giustizia	bass	Leo Kaplan
Ginevra Scotti	soprano	Marta Uersfeld
Martuccia, Alviano's housekeeper	contralto	Marie Welling-Bertram
Pietro, a cutthroat	tenor	
A youth	tenor	Franz Wartenberg
His friend	bass	Willy Schürmann
A young girl	soprano	Elisabeth Kandt
First senator	tenor	Erik Wirl
Second senator	baritone	Rudolf Brinkmann
Third senator	bass	Josef Gareis
A servant	bass	
A maidservant	mezzo-soprano	Anita Franz
First citizen	tenor	
Second citizen	baritone	Carl Bauermann
Third citizen	bass	Willy Schürmann
Father	bass	Paul Neumann
Mother	contralto	Frieda Hammerschmidt
A small boy, (silent part)		
First young man	tenor	Franz Wartenberg
Second young man	baritone	Carl Bauermann
Third young man	bass	Willy Schürmann
A giant citizen	bass	Karl Kröff

== Instrumentation ==
The orchestral score requires:

- 4 flutes (4th doubling piccolo), 4 oboes (4th doubling English horn), 4 clarinets in A/B♭ (4th doubling E♭ clarinet and basset horn), bass clarinet in B♭, 2 bassoons, contrabassoon
- 6 horns in F, 4 trumpets in C (4th doubling bass trumpet), 3 trombones, tuba
- timpani, xylophone, glockenspiel, bells, castanets, triangle, cymbals, tam-tam, tambourine, snare drum, bass drum, tenor drum (3 players)
- 2 harps, celesta, piano
- strings (violins I, violins II, violas, violoncellos, double basses).

== Synopsis ==
The opera is set in 16th-century Genoa

=== Act 1 ===
The young Genoan nobleman Alviano Salvago, hunchbacked and deformed, does not dare dream of the love of women. He wants to donate to the people of Genoa the island paradise called "Elysium" he has created. His friends, a group of dissolute young noblemen, have been using an underground grotto on the island for orgies with young women abducted from prominent Genoan families, and intervene with Duke Adorno to stop the transfer of ownership. One of them, Count Tamare, has set his sights on Carlotta, daughter of the Podestà. (The word "Podestà" refers to the holder of the highest civil office in the government of the cities of Central and Northern Italy during the Late Middle Ages.) Carlotta rejects him, as she is only interested in Salvago, whose soul she wants to paint.

=== Act 2 ===
Infuriated by Carlotta's rejection, Tamare swears to Adorno that he will take her by force. He also reveals the secret of the grotto to Adorno. Not wanting Salvago to become more popular than himself as a result of the gift, Adorno decides to use the existence of the secret grotto as an excuse to veto the transfer. While Salvago is sitting for Carlotta, she complains that she can't paint his soul if he keeps avoiding looking at her. To which he responds that ugly as he is, he still has the feelings of a man in the presence of a beautiful woman... Eventually Carlotta confesses that she loves him, but faints in his arms as both are overcome with emotion.

=== Act 3 ===
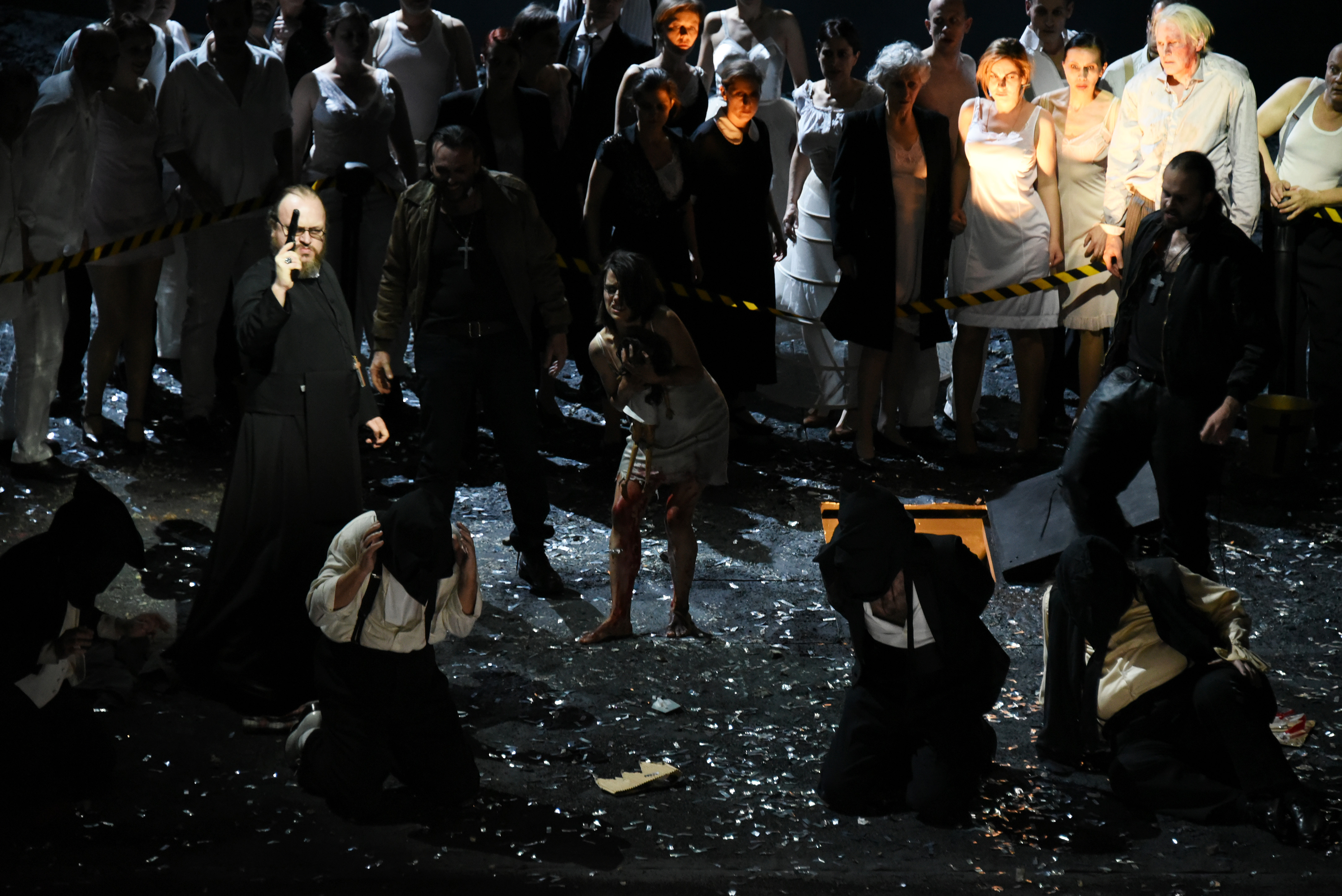
Les Stigmatisés, Opéra de Lyon 2015

The citizens of Genoa go to the island for the first time and are awed by what they see. Salvago asks the Podestà for Carlotta's hand in marriage. She evades him, wanders off alone, and in the grotto finally succumbs to Tamare who's wearing a mask. The Duke accuses Salvago of masterminding the abductions. Salvago, beside himself with worry for Carlotta, leads everyone to the underground grotto. Carlotta lies senseless on a bed, while Tamare prides himself on his conquering abilities. Salvago stabs him. Carlotta awakens, Salvago rushes to her side, but with her dying breath she calls for Tamare. Salvago, completely deranged, stumbles over Tamare's body as he makes his way through the stunned crowd.

== Recordings ==
(key: Conductor – Carlotta/Salvago/Tamare/Adorno/Lodovico)

- Winfried Zillig – Evelyn Lear/Helmut Krebs/Thomas Stewart/Franz Crass/Ernst Wiemann, recorded 1960, live in Hamburg, Voce
- Michael Gielen – Card/Götz/Mora-B/Reich/Hagenau, 1979, live in Frankfurt, MRF
- Gerd Albrecht – Martin-Ja/Riegel/Becht/Theo Adam/Meven, Radio-Symphonieorchester Wien, 1984, live in Salzburg, Orfeo
- Edo de Waart – Marilyn Schmiege/William Cochran/Cowan/van Tassel/Oosterkamp, Netherlands Radio Chorus and Orchestra, 1990, live in Amsterdam, Marco Polo cat. 223328
- Lothar Zagrosek – Elizabeth Connell/Heinz Kruse/Monte Pederson/Muff/Polgár, Deutsches Symphonie-Orchester Berlin, 1994, studio recording made in Jesus-Christus-Kirche Dahlem, Berlin, Decca (in its Entartete Musik series)
- Kent Nagano – Anne Schwanewilms/Robert Brubaker/Michael Volle/Hale/Schöne, Deutsches Symphonie-Orchester Berlin, 2005, video from Salzburg, incomplete, EuroArts
- Philippe Auguin – Blancas/Hoare/Hendricks/Hale/Ebbecke, 2010, video from Palermo, RAI
- James Conlon – Anja Kampe/Robert Brubaker/Martin Gantner/Johnson-J/Schöne, Chorus and Orchestra of Los Angeles Opera, 2010, live in Los Angeles, Bridge Records
- Alejo Pérez – Hofmann-MA/Workman/Neal/Marquardt/Eder, 2015, live in Lyon, Radio France
- Ingo Metzmacher – Naglestad/John Daszak/Maltman/Konieczny/Miles, 2017, video-stream from Munich, BR
