= The Changeling (Ōe novel) =

2000 novel by Kenzaburo Ōe

The Changeling (Japanese: 取り替え子 (チェンジリング), romanized: Torikaeko (Chenjiringu)) is a 2000 novel by Kenzaburō Ōe. It is the first book of a trilogy. A translation into English by Deborah Boliver Boehm (ISBN 9780802119360), was published in 2010 by Grove Press in the United States and by Atlantic Books in the United Kingdom. Boehm uses American English heavily in her translation.

== Plot ==
In the novel, a filmmaker named Goro Hanawa commits suicide, although he had appeared to be happy. His best friend, a novelist named Kogito Choko who is also his brother-in-law, discovers the suicide via one of 40 audiotapes that Goro recorded and sent to him. Chikashi Choko, Goro's sister and Kogito's wife, also learns that Goro has died. Kogito listens to the tapes and, in the words of Scott Espositom reviewing the novel in the Los Angeles Times, "What he finds is a rambling series of discourses on everything from the friendship they've shared since they were teens in the 1950s to Goro's ideas about art and life, their shared admiration for Rimbaud and a few secrets from the past."

== Characters ==
- Kogito Choko (長江 古義人, Chōkō Kogito): the main character
  - The name "Kogito" is a reference to the phrase Cogito ergo sum coined by Descartes. Kogito is based on Kenzaburō Ōe himself and his son is based on Ōe's son Hikari Ōe.
- Goro Hanawa (塙 吾良, Hanawa Gorō): a film director who is Kogito's brother-in-law and best friend
  - Goro is based on Juzo Itami, who was Ōe's brother in law.
- Chikashi Choko (長江 千樫, Chōkō Chikashi): Goro's sister and Kogito's wife
- Daio: the one-armed leader of a band of young right-wingers led by Kogito's father until 1945
- Peter: a homosexual U.S. Army officer serving in Japan in 1952
- Mitsu Azuma-Böme: an older Japanese woman who seeks Kogito out in Berlin
- Akari Choko (長江 アカリ, Chōkō Akari): Kogito's son, a disabled composer
  - Akari is based on Ōe's son Hikari Ōe.
- Ura Shima: Goro's teenage lover in Berlin one year before his suicide

== Reception ==
Scott Esposito wrote in the Los Angeles Times that the book "offers evidence that the Japanese master has regained his footing". Christopher Tayler wrote in The Guardian that, because a Western reader may not have context that a Japanese reader would have, it would be more difficult for him or her to get fulfillment from the novel.
