= Death by Water (novel) =

2009 novel by Kenzaburō Ōe

- First edition cover (Japan)
- Author: Kenzaburō Ōe
- Audio read by: Paul Boehmer
- Original title: 水死 (Suishi)
- Translator: Deborah Boliver Boehm
- Language: Japanese
- Series: Kogito Choko
- Release number: 5
- Set in: Tokyo and Shikoku
- Publisher: Kodansha
- Publication date: 15 December 2009
- Publication place: Japan
- English publication date: 6 October 2015
- Media type: Print (hardcover and paperback)
- Pages: 450
- ISBN: 978-4-06-215460-4 (hardcover)
- Dewey Decimal: 895.63/5
- LC Class: PL858.E14 S8513 2015
- Preceded by: Farewell, My Books!
- Followed by: In Late Style

Death by Water (Japanese: 水死, Hepburn: Suishi; "Drowning") is a 2009 novel by Kenzaburō Ōe. It was published in hardcover by Kodansha on 15 December 2009. It was published in paperback in 2012. An English translation by Deborah Boliver Boehm was published in 2015. The novel is the fifth in a series with the main character of Kogito Choko, who can be considered Ōe's literary alter ego.

The novel was longlisted for the 2016 Man Booker International Prize.

== Plot ==
The novel takes place partially in Tokyo but is primarily set in the forests of Shikoku and Kogito Choko's family home located in his hometown village in Shikoku. As a child in World War II, Kogito watched his father drown in a river. He returns to Shikoku in search of a red leather case which he believes contains documents that will answer the mysteries behind his father's life and death. He plans to use these documents to form the base of his new novel, which will be his final work.

== Publication ==
The novel was published in hardcover by Kodansha on 15 December 2009. It was published in paperback on 14 December 2012 by Kodansha Bunko, a paperback imprint of Kodansha. The novel was translated into English by Deborah Boliver Boehm and published by Grove Press on 6 October 2015.

== Reception ==
=== Translation ===
Kirkus Reviews called the novel "vintage Oe: provocative, doubtful without being cynical, elegant without being precious."

Publishers Weekly wrote, "Oe's deceptively tranquil idiom scans the violent history of postwar Japan and its present-day manifestations, in the end finding redemption."

Writing for The New York Times Book Review, Janice P. Nimura gave the novel a favourable review, writing, "True Oe devotees may find this thrill in "Death by Water," but thrilling or not, it remains a thoughtful reprise of a lifetime of literary endeavor."

Colin Dwyer of NPR lamented the novel's "tendency to repeat itself, action that amounts to little more than a play's stage direction and a translation that can get a bit stilted" but concluded that it is "worth the extra effort."
