= Somersault (disambiguation) =

Somersault is an acrobatic exercise in which a person does a full 360° flip.

Somersault may also refer to:

- Somersault (Chicane album), 2007
- Somersault (Eggstone album), 1994
- Somersault (Beach Fossils album), 2017
- Somersault (film), a 2004 Australian independent film
- Somersault (novel), a novel by Kenzaburō Ōe
- "Somersault" (song), a 2004 song by Zero 7 featuring Sia
