= The Pinch Runner Memorandum =

1976 novel by Kenzaburo Oe

The Pinchrunner Memorandum (ピンチランナー調書, Pinchi rannā chōsho) is a 1976 novel by a Japanese novelist Kenzaburō Ōe. The novel concerns such modern themes as violence and restlessness of new age youth in the paranoia of the nuclear age.

It was translated into English by Michiko N. Wilson and Michael K. Wilson.

== Plot summary ==
In the novel, the father of a mentally ill child meets another parent of another disabled child, who is known throughout the book as "Mori's Father". Mori's Father tells the narrator of a chain of surrealistic incidents that happened to him and his son Mori. It seems that an alien supreme being or force has enabled Mori and his father to undergo a transformation, via which a 38-year-old father became 18 years old and an 8-year-old mentally disabled child became a 28-year-old fully intelligent person. (There is some logic to the arithmetic that 38-20=18 and 8+20=28.)

It seems Mori and his father have undertaken a mission to assassinate a certain Patron, who is manipulating and clashing two opposing youth groups, so that one of them may create a "dirty" nuclear bomb, threatening Tokyo and more, and thus place power into Patron's hands.

== Literary significance and criticism ==
The novel reads like a feverish nightmare, and is full of unexpected twists and satire, yet it never neglects bringing to light the protagonists' emotional experiences and tragedies.

Ōe's personal life (his son Hikari is autistic) is an obvious strong influence on the novel.
