= Das verratene Meer =

Opera by Hans Werner Henze

- Opera by Hans Werner Henze
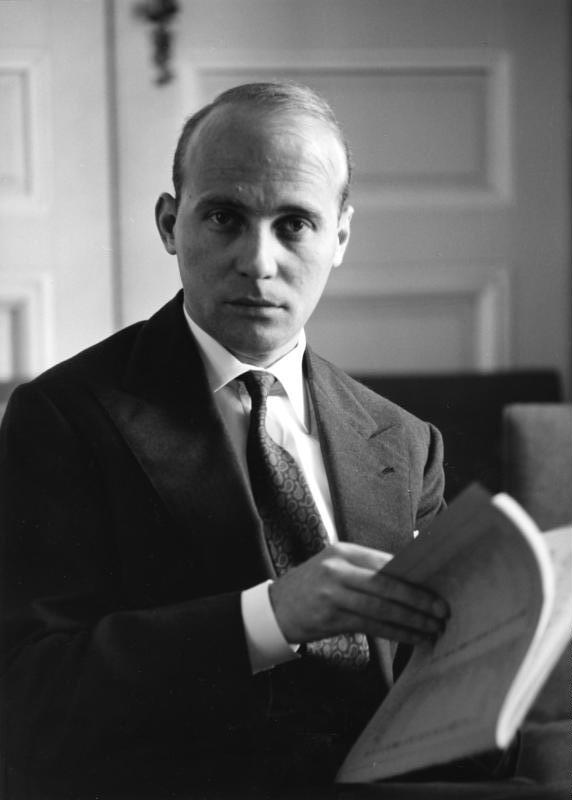
- The composer in 1960
- Translation: The Betrayed Sea
- Librettist: Hans-Ulrich Treichel
- Based on: The Sailor Who Fell from Grace with the Sea by Yukio Mishima
- Premiere: 5 May 1990; Deutsche Oper Berlin

Das verratene Meer (The Betrayed Sea) is an opera in two parts and 14 scenes, with music by Hans Werner Henze to a German libretto by Hans-Ulrich Treichel, after Yukio Mishima's novel The Sailor Who Fell from Grace with the Sea (Japanese: 午後の曳航, romanized: Gogo no eiko). Composed between 1986 and 1989, it was Henze's ninth opera, his third that he wrote for the Deutsche Oper Berlin.

== Performance history ==
It was first performed at the Deutsche Oper Berlin on 5 May 1990, when it was conducted by Markus Stenz and produced by Götz Friedrich. The US premiere was at San Francisco Opera on 8 November 1991.

The opera was revised by the composer. The second version, called the Japanese version, was presented in a concert performance on June 19, 2004 at the Suntory Hall of Tokyo. It was also the national premiere of this opera, it was conducted by Kazuyoshi Akiyama. This version, revised by conductor Gerd Albrecht, was then presented at the Salzburg Festival of 2006 in a concert version. For the first time, the opera was performed in Japanese language and with an all-Japanese cast. It was dedicated to the 80th birthday of the composer.

The Viennese version, presented in December 2020 at the Vienna State Opera, is based on the Japanese version but includes several parts of the original version, mainly orchestra interludes. It stems from conductor Simone Young.

== Roles ==
Roles, voice types, premiere cast
Role	Voice type	Premiere cast, 5 May 1990 Conductor: Markus Stenz
Fusako Kuroda, a 33-year old widow	soprano	Stephanie Sundine/Beverly Morgan (Note: Ms. Sundine acted while Ms. Morgan sang off-stage, due to Ms. Sundine's illness at the time of the premiere.)
Noboru, her son aged 13, number 3 in the gang	tenor	Clemens Bieber
Ryuji Tsukazaki, merchant navy officer	baritone	Andreas Schmidt
Ship's mate	bass-baritone	
Gang member number 1	baritone	Martin Gantner
Gang member number 2	countertenor	
Gang member number 4	baritone	
Gang member number 5	bass-baritone	

== Synopsis ==
Part I: Summer

- Scene 1 – Fusako's house
- Scene 2 – An abandoned warehouse
- Scene 3 – A park on a hill above the sea
- Scene 4 – Fusako's house
- Scene 5 – The warehouse
- Scene 6 – The park
- Scene 7 – On the pier in the harbour
- Scene 8 – The warehouse

Part II: Winter

- Scene 9 – The park
- Scene 10 – The warehouse
- Scene 11 – Fusako's house
- Scene 12 – The warehouse
- Scene 13 – Fusako's boutique
- Scene 14 – The warehouse

== Recordings ==
- 2006: Gerd Albrecht conducting a Japanese cast (including Mari Midorkawa as Fusako Kuroda; Tsuyoshi Mihara as Ryuji Tsukazaki) and the RAI National Symphony Orchestra for the Salzburg Festival (live recording 26 August 2006) 2 CDs, Orfeo C794 092 I
- 2021: Simone Young conducting the Vienna State Opera and Vera-Lotte Boecker as Fusako Kuroda; Bo Skovhus as Ryuji Tsukazaki; 2 CDs, Capriccio C5460; named Opera Recording of the Year by the magazine Limelight.
