= Aghwee the Sky Monster =

Japanese novel

Cover of the US edition

Aghwee The Sky Monster (空の怪物アグイー, Sora no kaibutsu Aguii) is a 1964 short story/novel by the Japanese and Nobel laureate author Kenzaburō Ōe. It has been translated into English by John Nathan and published in the volume Teach Us to Outgrow Our Madness, along with the title story, Prize Stock and The Day He Himself Shall Wipe My Tears Away. Aghwee was one of the first in Ōe's series of stories inspired by the birth of his autistic son Hikari on June 13, 1963.

== Plot ==
Aghwee opens with the anonymous narrator, a 28-year-old man, talking about the near-blindness in one of his eyes, the result of an attack by a group of children that year. Because of his blurred vision he sees "two worlds superimposed". The attack had prompted him to remember the events of the story, which took place ten years earlier, and the memory freed him from hatred of his assailants.

The narrator had worked as a companion to a composer, D, then aged 28, who had (apparently) gone mad after the death of his infant son. D says that when he goes outside, he is visited by the spirit of his son, who swoops down out of the sky: "a fat baby in a white cotton nightgown, big as a kangaroo". D talks to Aghwee but refuses to interact with the people around him, saying that he is no longer living in the present time. The narrator is told by D's estranged wife that D had killed their son, starving him because he was born with a brain hernia (which later turned out to be a benign tumour). 'Aghwee' was the only word the child had spoken. The wife accuses D of fleeing reality. She gives the narrator a key which turns out to unlock a box of D's compositions, which D burns and buries. D takes the narrator to various places where D had previously enjoyed himself, as well as sending him to inform D's former girlfriend that he will no longer see her.

Matters reach a crisis when a pack of dogs (of which Aghwee is said to be afraid) comes across D and the narrator while D is talking to Aghwee. However it is the narrator who panics until he feels a hand on his shoulder, "gentle as the essence of all gentleness" which he says he knows to be the D's but imagines to be Aghwee's. D then tells the narrator more about his experience of the world, saying that the sky contains all those whom a person has lost; he stopped living in the present to prevent the number of figures floating in his sky from increasing.

The story reaches an end with the death of D on Christmas Eve. D begins talking to Aghwee while he and the narrator are out in the city. While waiting to cross a road, "D cried out and thrust both arms in front of him as if he were trying to rescue something". D is injured and is taken to hospital. As he lies dying, the narrator asks him if he had simply made up Aghwee as a cover for his suicide, and says that he himself was about to believe in the spirit. In answer D merely smiles; whether mocking or "friendly mischief" the narrator cannot tell.

In a coda, the narrator returns to the recent incident when he was attacked by a group of children, who unaccountably became frightened and started to throw stones at him. He sensed "a being I knew and missed" — Aghwee — leaving him and returning to the sky. He no longer hated the children, and started to think of the figures who had filled his own sky over the intervening decade, associating the "gratuitous sacrifice" of his eye with perception of those figures.

== Reception ==
This story has been lauded by comparative literary critics, being compared even to famous Japanese short story author Akutagawa Ryunosuke.
