= Anne Schwanewilms =

German lyric soprano (born 1967)

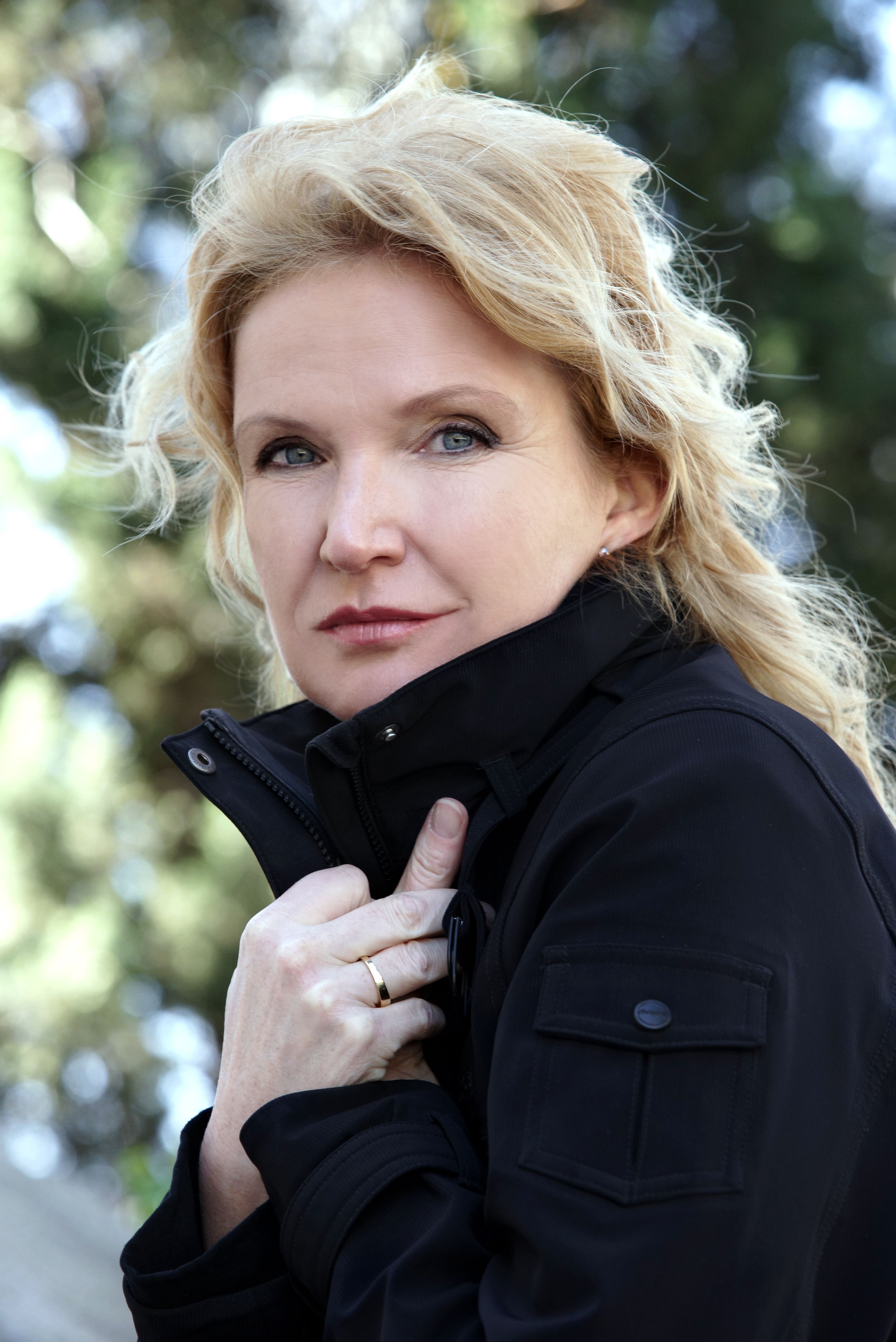
Schwanewilms in 2015

Anne Schwanewilms (born 1967, in Gelsenkirchen) is a German soprano who sings Lyric, Spinto, and Dramatic Soprano roles. She studied gardening before training in Cologne as a singer with the German bass Hans Sotin. She is particularly associated with performing the works of Richard Wagner, Franz Schreker, Alban Berg, and Richard Strauss.

She came to widespread international attention singing Gutrune in 1996 in Der Ring des Nibelungen at the Bayreuth Festival.

She sang the principal role of Carlotta in Franz Schreker's Die Gezeichneten at the Salzburg Festival in 2005, recorded and subsequently published on DVD by Opus Arte.

On 26 January 2011, she performed the role of the Marschallin in the jubilee centenary performance of Der Rosenkavalier by Richard Strauss at the Semperoper in Dresden.

Her debut at the Metropolitan Opera in New York City in the role of the Kaiserin in Die Frau ohne Schatten took place on 7 November 2013.

Since 2018/19 season, she has been a professor of singing at the Hochschule für Musik Franz Liszt, Weimar.

== Awards ==
In 2002, she was named Singer of the Year by the German magazine Opernwelt.
