= Mansaku Itami =

Japanese film director

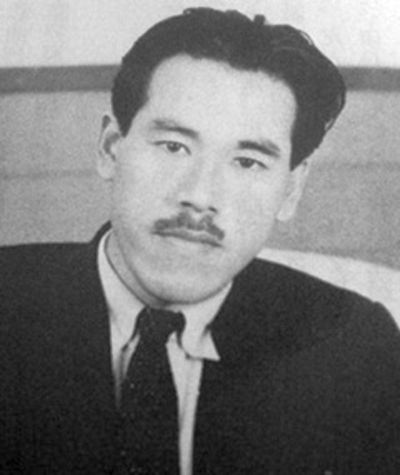
- Mansaku Itami
- Born: 2 January 1900; Matsuyama, Ehime, Japan
- Died: 21 September 1946 (aged 46)
- Other name: Yoshitoyo Ikeuchi
- Occupations: Film director, screenwriter
- Children: Juzo Itami
- Relatives: Hikari Oe (grandson)

Mansaku Itami (伊丹万作; real name Yoshitoyo Ikeuchi 池内義豊; 2 January 1900 – 21 September 1946) was a Japanese film director and screenwriter known for his critical, sometimes satirical portraits of Japan and its history. He is the father of the director Juzo Itami.

== Career ==
Originally from Matsuyama, Ehime, Itami joined the Nikkatsu studio in 1927, but the very next year moved to the actor Chiezō Kataoka's company, Chiezō Productions, where he made his directorial debut with Adauchi Ruten. His samurai films diverged from the norm in that they were not heroic epics of the sort which had by that time become formulaic, but rather satires that used the established symbols and iconography of the samurai culture to comment on both historical and modern society. His work was championed by the film critic Fuyuhiko Kitagawa. His most famous work is Akanishi Kakita, which is based on a story by Naoya Shiga and still survives (unlike many of his other films).

In 1937, he collaborated with director Arnold Fanck on a German-Japanese co-production, starring the young Setsuko Hara. This eventually became two slightly different films: Atarashiki Tsuchi (The New Earth) in Japan, while Die Tochter des Samurai (Daughter of the Samurai) was the German version.

He died of tuberculosis in 1946. His screenplays' popularity endured, however, and he is credited as a writer as recently as 1986's Kokushi Muso, a remake of his 1932 film of the same name.

== Family ==
His son Yoshihiro Ikeuchi, who later changed his name to Juzo Itami, followed in his footsteps, becoming one of the pre-eminent Japanese filmmakers of the late 20th century. His daughter Yukari married Kenzaburō Ōe, the Nobel Prize-winning novelist. Ōe edited a collection of his father-in-law's essays.

== Filmography ==
- Adauchi Ruten (仇討流転) (1928)
- Zoku Banka Jigoku: Dai Ippen (Elegy of Hell) (1928)
- The Peerless Patriot (国士無双 Kokushi musō) (1932)
- Chuji Uridasu (1935)
- Akanishi Kakita (Capricious Young Man) (1936)
- Furusato (Hometown) (1937)
- The Daughter of the Samurai, co-directed with Arnold Fanck (1937)
- Kyojin-den (1938)

== Additional Screenwriting Credits ==
- Tenka Taiheiki (Peace on Earth) (1928)
- Hōrō Zanmai (The Wandering Gambler) (1928)
- Muhomatsu no Issho (the 1958 version is also known as Rickshaw Man; the others are also known as The Life of Matsu the Untamed) (1943, 1958, 1965)
- Te o Tsunagu Kora (Children Hand in Hand) (1948, 1963)
- Ore wa Yojimbo (I'm the Bodyguard) (1950)
- Kokushi Muso (1986)
