= Hiroshima Notes =

1965 collection of essays by Japanese writer Kenzaburō Ōe

- Author: Kenzaburō Ōe
- Original title: ヒロシマ・ノート; Hiroshima nōto
- Translator: David L. Swain; Toshi Yonezawa
- Language: Japanese
- Genre: Essays; Atomic bomb literature
- Publisher: Iwanami Shoten
- Publication date: 1965
- Publication place: Japan
- English publication date: 1981
- Media type: Print

Hiroshima Notes (Japanese: ヒロシマ・ノート, Hepburn: Hiroshima nōto) is a 1965 collection of essays by Japanese writer Kenzaburō Ōe based on his visits to Hiroshima between 1963 and 1964. The work is a seminal text in atomic bomb literature, blending reportage, philosophical reflection, and existential inquiry.

== Content ==
Hiroshima Notes originated from Ōe’s trips to Hiroshima to attend the World Conference Against Atomic and Hydrogen Bombs. The essays document his encounters with hibakusha (atomic bomb survivors), doctors, activists, and ordinary citizens living in the aftermath of the 1945 atomic bombing. Rather than offering a historical account, Ōe focuses on the moral, existential, and human dimensions of survival in a nuclear age.

Key themes include:

- The dignity and autonomy of hibakusha who refuse to be defined solely as victims.
- The ethical responsibility of those who were not directly affected by the bombing.
- The political and moral failings of the anti-nuclear movement, which Ōe criticizes for infighting and grandstanding.
- The existential confrontation with atrocity and the possibility of authentic human choice in the face of absurdity.

Ōe highlights individuals such as the doctor Shigetō Fumio, who dedicated his life to treating hibakusha, and Miyamoto Sadao, a hospitalized survivor who spoke at a peace march despite his failing health. Through these portraits, Ōe explores what it means to live—and die—with purpose in a world permanently shadowed by nuclear threat.

== Development ==
Ōe began writing the essays for the journal Sekai in 1963, shortly after publishing his novel A Personal Matter. The pieces were collected in book form in 1965 by Iwanami Shoten. An English translation by David L. Swain and Toshi Yonezawa was published in 1981 and reissued by Grove Press in 1996.

In 1970, Ōe published a sister volume, Okinawa Notes (沖縄ノート), also with Iwanami Shoten. This work examines Okinawa under U.S. occupation, its role as a military base during the Korean and Vietnam Wars, and uses the Okinawan experience to question what it means to be Japanese and the state of democracy in mainland Japan.

== Reception ==
Scholar John Whittier Treat argues that Ōe frames Hiroshima as an “extreme situation” that reveals the contours of human freedom and responsibility. He notes that Ōe’s approach is deeply influenced by Jean-Paul Sartre, particularly the concepts of the Other, bad faith, and authenticity. Ōe positions the hibakusha as an existentialist Other, a mirror through which he examines his own identity as a non-victim, a Japanese, and a writer. This relationship is ambivalent: Ōe both admires the survivors’ courage and feels estranged from their experience.

Treat suggests that Ōe’s attempt to extract “dignity” and “humanism” from the atrocity risks sentimentalizing the survivors and diluting the radical absurdity of nuclear destruction. Other critics, such as Kurihara Sadako, have accused Ōe of idealizing hibakusha activists and thereby obscuring the broader, more mundane suffering of ordinary survivors. Similarly, Robert Jay Lifton and Sidra Dekoven Ezrahi have questioned whether nonfiction can adequately convey traumatic experience. Treat notes that Hiroshima Notes ultimately “reads not as a simple ode to heroic, if tragic, martyrs, but rather as a commentary on the impossibility of such sentimental ideals after a nuclear atrocity”.

In a 2023 retrospective essay, Umehara Toshiya reaffirms the book’s contemporary relevance, noting that Ōe’s warnings about nuclear complacency remain urgent in an era of renewed atomic threats. Umehara emphasizes Ōe’s focus on the “sanctity of life” and the individual’s right to die with dignity, a theme underscored by Ōe’s non-judgmental depiction of survivor suicides as acts of reclaimed autonomy.
