= Karl Ziegler (tenor) =

German opera singer

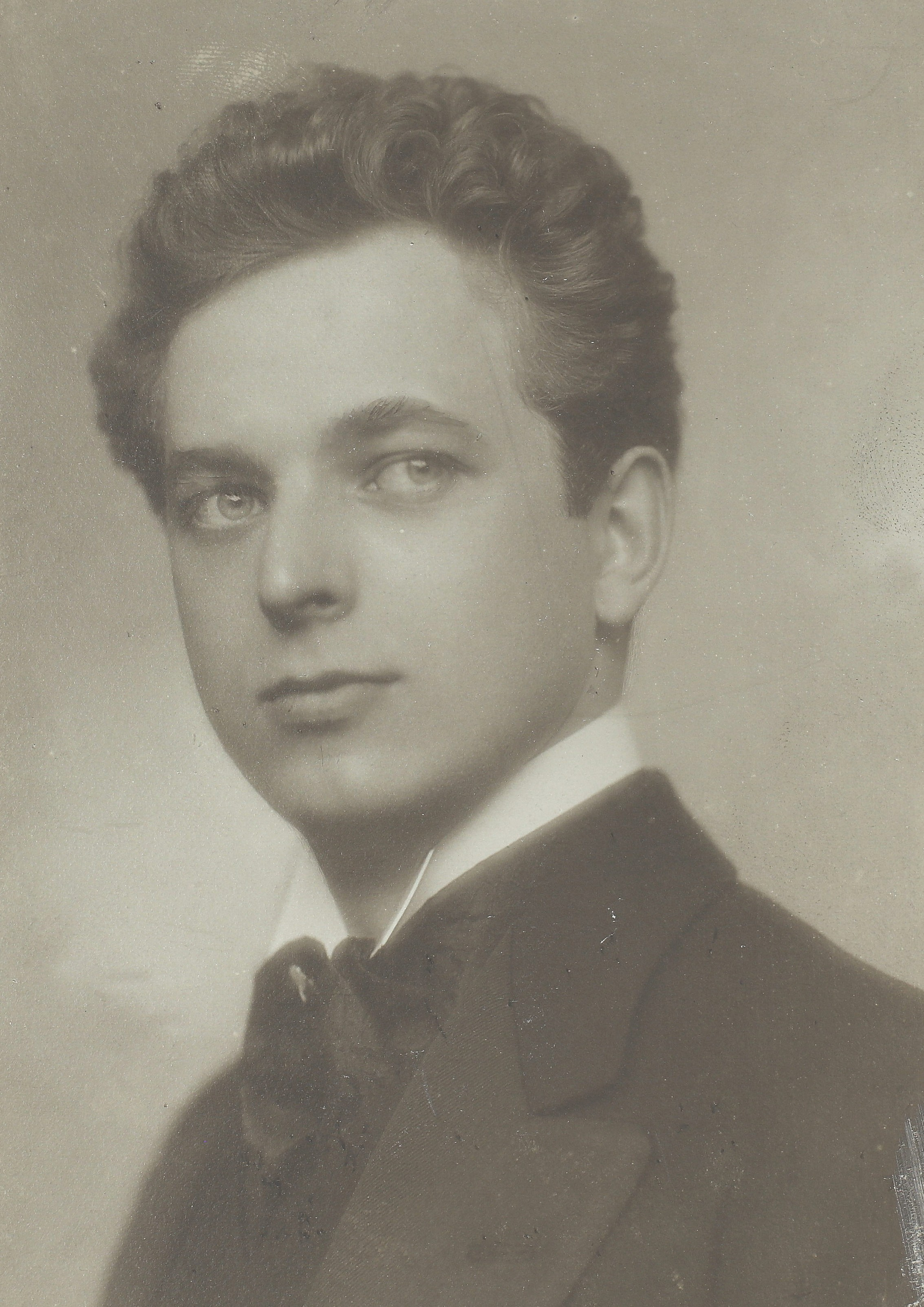
Photograph, c. 1910

Karl Ziegler (1886–1944) was an operatic tenor, who was active in Germany and Austria during the first half of the 20th century.

== Professional career ==
He began his career with an engagement at the Vienna Volksoper from 1908 till 1913. In 1911 he sang the role of the King's son in the Vienna premiere of Engelbert Humperdinck's Königskinder, and in 1913 he sang the role of Folco in the first performance in German of Mascagni's Isabeau. In 1911–1912 he sang the role of David in Wagner's Die Meistersinger von Nürnberg at the Bayreuth Festival. From 1913 till 1917 he worked at the Hamburg State Opera, and from 1917 till 1919 he was engaged at the Frankfurt Opera. There he created the role of Alviano Salvago in Franz Schreker's Die Gezeichneten (on 25 April 1918). Following several guest appearances in 1918–1919, he became a permanent member of the Vienna State Opera from 1919 till 1922, followed by more guest appearances till 1937. From 1939 to 1941 he made several guest appearances at the Vienna Volksoper.

In the 1930s he also had a certain reputation as an operetta singer, following several performances for Austrian radio.
