= Rouse Up O Young Men of the New Age! =

1983 novel by Kenzaburo Oe

Rouse Up O Young Men of the New Age! (新しい人よ、眼ざめよ; Atarashii hito yo mezameyo) is a 1983 semi-autobiographical novel by Japanese Nobel Prize winning author Kenzaburō Ōe, about his day-to-day life with his mentally handicapped son, Hikari (represented by an alter ego called "Eeyore") and the effect that William Blake's poetry has had on both his life and work. The title comes from the preface to Blake's epic poem Milton.

== Plot summary ==
Ōe wishes to write a set of definitions to prepare handicapped children like his son for the real world. He struggles with definitions for concepts such as "death," only to learn that his son Eeyore has just, as much to teach him about life. Ōe relates his interpretations of events with Eeyore in light of Blake's poetry, and discusses the influence of and similarities between Blake's work on his own.

== Editions in English ==
(translated by John Nathan)

- hardback ISBN 0-8021-1710-4
- paperback ISBN 0-8021-3968-X
