= The Beautiful Annabel Lee was Chilled and Killed =

2007 novel by Kenzaburo Oe

The Beautiful Annabel Lee was Chilled and Killed (﨟たしアナベル・リイ 総毛立ちつ身まかりつ) is a novel by Kenzaburō Ōe, published by Shinchosha on November 20, 2007. The novel's title was inspired by the poem "Annabel Lee" by Edgar Allan Poe, which was written in 1849 and was the author's last complete poem.

The novel's protagonist, Sakura, is an internationally renowned actress who is performing in a movie production in Japan. As the story evolves, it emerges that she was sexually abused by her American guardian in her childhood. After a scandal about a film crew member who is involved in filming child pornography, the production of the movie stops. Thirty years later, Sakura has recovered from her childhood trauma, and has become a storyteller to recite the tale of a peasant uprising which occurred in the narrator's home town long ago. Like Annabel Lee in Poe's poem, the protagonist has recovered from traumatic events from years ago, and has returned to face a bright future.

In one interview with Ōe, the author discussed the differences between this novel and his other works, noting: "This is the first time I have chosen a woman to be the leading figure." While women appear in his other novels, he noted, they are used as minor characters in order to write about man. He added: "For the first time, I decided to write a novel with a happy ending, where someone flees from a place of suffering.” Ōe concluded: “After I finished writing, I felt that a bright outlook gained after overcoming life's difficulties is about actively accepting one's youth anew".

The novel has been translated into Chinese, and Italian (La vergine eterna, ISBN 978-88-11-68378-0), but not (yet) into English.
