= M/T and the Narrative About the Marvels of the Forest =

1986 novel by Kenzaburō Ōe

M/T and the Narrative About the Marvels of the Forest (M/Tと森のフシギの物語, Emutī to Mori no Fushigi no Monogatari) is a novel by Japanese author Kenzaburō Ōe, published in 1986. Like most of Ōe's later work, it features his mentally disabled son Hikari (光, light), although most of the story is focused on the mythological and actual history of the small village of Ose, located on the island of Shikoku. The first-person narrator is trying to put into writing the oral traditions of the village, as told to him by his grandmother and other village elders. This is a mission that he has been trying to accomplish since his youth. At times it has felt like an impossible task, and as a boy he even tried to commit suicide by drowning in order to escape from it. The story goes back to the foundation of the village by ousted young samurai, and moves on through a period in which the village tried to hide its existence from the outside world, to more recent and more accurate narrative about the time of the Meiji restoration.
