= The Day He Himself Shall Wipe My Tears Away =

1972 novel by Kenzaburō Ōe

Cover of the US edition.

The Day He Himself Shall Wipe My Tears Away (みずから我が涙をぬぐいたまう日, Mizukara Waga Namida o Nugui Tamau Hi) is a novella by the Japanese author Kenzaburō Ōe, first published in Japanese in 1972. It has been translated into English by John Nathan and was published in 1977 together with Teach Us to Outgrow Our Madness, Prize Stock and Aghwee the Sky Monster. The work deals with themes of militarism and emperor-worship through the reminiscences of an unreliable narrator.

== Plot summary ==
The novella is set in the summer of 1970. It is narrated by a 35-year-old man (like all the characters he is not named) who is lying in hospital waiting to die of liver cancer, although the doctors do not believe that the cancer is real. Early on in the novel, the narrator associates his cancer with the imperial symbols, calling it, "a flourishing bed of yellow hyacinth or possibly chrysanthemums bathed in a faint purple light". He wears a pair of goggles with green cellophane lenses. The story opens with a late-night encounter between the narrator and a "lunatic", resembling both the narrator's father and a Dharma, who appears at the end of his bed. The lunatic asks the narrator what he is, to which he replies "I'm cancer" and throws his nostril clippers at the lunatic.

The remainder of the novel comprises the narrator's recollections of his childhood. The main narrative is periodically interrupted by discussions between the narrator and "the acting executor of the will", who is transcribing the narrator's story. Looking forward to his death, the narrator sings the song, "Happy Days Are Here Again". He fantasises about obtaining revenge on his hated mother by summoning her to attend his death, and in his narrative tries to recreate his earlier "Happy Days" of the latter years of the Second World War.

His first reminiscences, however, are of the immediate postwar years, in which he was ostracised by the other children for his poverty and "animal violence". He was caught and humiliated by his mother while attempting to commit suicide. He also remembers that by the end of the war he had picked up that his mother's real father had been executed for participating in a revolt against the emperor in 1912. She had then been adopted by a nationalist family working in China. There she met her future husband, who brought her to the village.

The narrator's father was 'associated with the military', and was part of an anti-Tojo movement in the Kanto Army to promote General Ishiwara; after the plan failed, he returned to the village on New Year's Day 1943 and shut himself up in the storehouse. There he wore the goggles later used by the narrator and used headphones to listen to a radio. The narrator's parents broke off contact with one another after the father's son by his first marriage deserted from the Japanese army in Manchuria. Both parents sent telegrams to contacts in the army: the mother to help her stepson escape, and the father to preserve the family honour by having him shot. The son was shot. The mother claimed the ashes, and thereafter referred to her husband only as ano hito (あの人) — "that man", or "a certain party".

The narrator describes the time spent with his father in the storehouse after this breach as the first "Happy Days" of his life. They culminated in an attempted revolt led by his father on 16 August 1945, the day after the end of the war. The plan was to kill the emperor (to "accomplish what your father tried and failed to do", as the narrator's father said to his wife), and to blame the act on the Americans, thereby preventing the country's surrender.

The father takes his son with him and his co-conspirators as he leaves the valley. The group sing the closing chorale from Bach's cantata Ich will den Kreuzstab gerne tragen, BWV 56, "Komm, o Tod, du Schlafes Bruder, Komm und führe mich nur fort" (Come, O death, brother of sleep, come and lead me forth). Another line from the same cantata is: "Da wischt mir die Tränen mein Heiland selbst ab" (My saviour himself shall wipe my tears away). The father tells his son that the words mean that the emperor will wipe their tears away.

The plot is a failure, and the conspirators are all killed (in the narrator's opinion, "very likely" by American agents in disguise). At the moment of his father's death, he recalls that he saw, "high in the sky... a shining gold chrysanthemum against a vast background of purple light... the light from that flower irradiated his Happy Days". By the time he reaches this part of the story, however, his mother has arrived at the hospital, and it is she who wipes away the tears he sheds. She recalls that her son only survived the massacre of the conspirators because he had already run away. The "acting executor of the will" agrees with the mother, and from her words it appears that she is the narrator's wife.

Confronted with his mother's version of events, the narrator retreats further into his own world. He wears a set of earphones as well as the goggles, and listens to a recording of the cantata while singing "Happy Days". He imagines himself back at the moment of his father's death, crawling towards a father figure so that, "his blood and his tears will be wiped away".

== Response ==
John Nathan, in the introduction to his 1977 translation of the work, calls it, "Oe's most difficult and disturbing work to date". Like other commentators, he sees the novel as a response to, and parody of, the militarism of Yukio Mishima, whose failed coup and suicide had taken place in 1970, the same year in which Oe sets his story. He ascribes its power to the tension between the "anger and longing" which he finds in the author's work. Susan Napier expands on this interpretation, seeing the narrator as feeling the desire to escape from his adult responsibilities back into childhood, and feeling resentment towards his mother who prevents him from doing so.

The difficulty of the novel can be ascribed to a series of disruptive narrative techniques. Episodes are related out of order, repeated and altered in each re-telling. Oe also blurs the distinctions between the different characters, by the fluid use of pronouns and the omission of quotation marks.

Oe uses the discussions between the narrator and the executor (towards the end, including contributions from the narrator's mother) to include criticism of the main narrative within the story. The executor asks about parts of the story omitted by the narrator, and suggests that he is hiding "unpleasant memories... creating the bloated feeling" Her comments also prompt observations from the narrator on his own story: when she questions his continual use of the term "a certain party" instead of "father", he responds that, "To make someone sound like an imaginary figure can be a way of debasing him, but it can also be a way of exalting him into a kind of idol". Michiko Wilson amplifies this latter point, arguing that this terminology furthers the identification of the father with the emperor, as he is traditionally not referred to by name.

The identification of the father with the emperor is only one of several archetypes which Wilson finds in the relationship between the father and the narrator: as well as emperor-subject, there are references to God-Christ and Don Quixote-Sancho Panza. Beyond the obvious satirical intent, she argues that these overlapping references are part of Oe's strategy of defamiliarisation, through which the reader is forced to look at events through fresh eyes. Another element of this strategy is the use of counter-intuitive contrasting pairs within the family: the small boy looks after his obese father; the mother tries to save her stepson, while the father tries to kill him; the son hates his mother, and (in the narrator's view) vice versa.

Napier argues that the satirical aspect of the work is not completely effective. She notes the difficulty of having one narrator recount both his own romantic delusion and the sordid reality which undermines it, and comments that, "by having one narrative voice encapsulating both, [Oe] creates an ambivalent final impression".
