= Ōse, Ehime =

Dissolved municipality in Kita district, Ehime prefecture, Japan

Ōse (大瀬村, Ōse-mura) was a village in Kita District, Ehime Prefecture, Japan. In 1955 it was formally merged into the town of Uchiko.

It had a population of 2,301 in 1921.

Ōse is the birthplace of Nobel laureate Kenzaburō Ōe.
