= Mariko Koike =

Japanese novelist (born 1952)

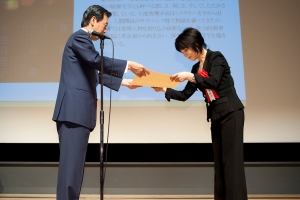
- Born: October 28, 1952 (age 73); Tokyo
- Spouse: Yoshinaga Fujita

Mariko Koike (小池 真理子, Koike Mariko; born 28 October 1952) is a Japanese novelist.

== Biography ==
Mariko Koike is a popular detective and horror novelist. Koike was born in Tokyo and graduated from Seikei University. Her first collection of essays was Recommendations to Women of the World and it became a bestseller. She has been a novelist since her novel came out in 1986. Several of her novels have been translated in to English by Deborah Boliver Boehm. She lived with her husband writer Yoshinaga Fujita until his death on 30 January 2020. They lived in Karuizawa, Nagano Prefecture.

== Awards ==
- 1989 Japan Mystery Writers' Association Prize, for Tsuma no Onnatomodachi (My Wife's Female Friend)
- 1996 Naoki Prize, for Koi (Love)
- 1998 Shimase Romance Literary Prize

== Bibliography ==
- The Graveyard Apartment (1988)
- A Cappella (1990)
- The Cat In The Coffin (1990)
