= The Sailor Who Fell from Grace with the Sea =

1963 novel by Yukio Mishima

- First edition
- Author: Yukio Mishima
- Original title: 午後の曳航
- Translator: John Nathan
- Cover artist: Susan Mitchell
- Language: Japanese
- Genre: Philosophical fiction
- Publisher: Kodansha; Alfred A. Knopf (U.S.)
- Publication date: 1963
- Publication place: Japan
- English publication date: 1965
- Media type: Print (hardback & paperback)
- Pages: 181
- OCLC: 29389499
- Dewey Decimal: 895.6/35 20
- LC Class: PL833.I7 G613 1994

The Sailor Who Fell from Grace with the Sea (Japanese: 午後の曳航, romanized: Gogo no eikō, lit. 'Afternoon tow') is a novel written by Yukio Mishima, published in Japanese in 1963 and translated into English by John Nathan in 1965.

== Plot ==
The story follows the actions of Noboru Kuroda, an adolescent boy living in Yokohama, Japan. He and his group of friends do not believe in conventional morality and are led by the "chief". Noboru discovers a peephole into the bedroom of his widowed upper-class mother, Fusako, and uses it to spy on her. Noboru is interested in ships, and near the end of the summer, Fusako, who owns a fashion clothing store, takes him to visit one. There they meet Ryuji Tsukazaki, a sailor and second mate aboard the commercial steamer Rakuyo. Ryuji has always remained distant from the land, but he has no real ties with the sea or other sailors. Ryuji and Fusako develop a romantic relationship, and their first night together is spied upon by Noboru. Noboru believes he has witnessed the true order of the universe because of Ryuji's connection to the sea.

At first Noboru reveres Ryuji, seeing him as a connection to one of the few meaningful things in the world, the sea – and tells his friends about his hero. Noboru is overjoyed when Ryuji returns to the Rakuyo, leaving Fusako behind, because he sees this as being perfect. However, Ryuji eventually begins to lose Noboru's respect, beginning when Ryuji one day meets Noboru and his gang at the park. Ryuji had drenched himself in the water fountain, which Noboru feels is childish. Noboru takes issue with what he perceives as an undignified appearance and greeting by Ryuji. His frustration with Ryuji culminates when Fusako reveals that she and Ryuji are engaged.

While Ryuji is sailing, he and Fusako exchange letters. Returning to Yokohama days before the New Year, he moves into their house and gets engaged to Fusako. Ryuji then lets the Rakuyo sail without him as the New Year begins. This distances him from Noboru, whose group resents fathers as a terrible manifestation of a dreadful position. Fusako has lunch with one of her clients, Yoriko, a famous actress. After Fusako breaks the news of her engagement to Ryuji, the lonely actress advises Fusako to have a private investigation done on Ryuji, sharing her disappointing experience with her ex-fiancé. Fusako ultimately decides to take this advice in order to prove to Yoriko that Ryuji is the man he says he is. After they depart, the investigation is done and Ryuji passes the test. Noboru's secret of the peephole is discovered, but in order to fulfil the role of a lovable father, Ryuji does not punish him severely, despite being asked to by Fusako.

As Ryuji and Fusako's wedding draws near, Noboru begins to grow more angry and calls an "emergency meeting" of the gang. Due to the philosophy of the gang, they decide that the only way to make Ryuji a "hero" again is to kill and dissect him. The chief reassures the gang by quoting a Japanese law that states that juveniles under the age of 14 are not legally punishable. (Three of the six boys will turn 14 in the next month; the other three, a month later.) Their plan is that Noboru will lure Ryuji to the dry dock in Sugita. They each bring an item to assist in the drugging and dissection of Ryuji. The items include a strong hemp rope, a thermos for the tea, cups, sugar, a blindfold, pills to drug the tea, and a scalpel. Their plan works; as he drinks the tea, Ryuji muses on the life he has given up at sea, and the life of love and death he has abandoned. The novel ends when Ryuji sees the chief putting on his gloves and, giving no attention to it, drinks his tea while lost in his thoughts.

== Adaptations ==
The novel was adapted into the film The Sailor Who Fell from Grace with the Sea, starring Kris Kristofferson and Sarah Miles, in 1976 by Lewis John Carlino; the setting was changed from Japan to England. The Brazilian band Nenhum de Nós composed a song entitled "O Marinheiro Que Perdeu As Graças do Mar" (name of the work translated into Portuguese), performed by vocalist Thedy Corrêa, who was inspired by the book to write the song, which was released on the album Nenhum de Nós, in 1987. Hans Werner Henze adapted the material into his 1990 opera Das verratene Meer to a libretto by Hans-Ulrich Treichel.
