= Anja Kampe =

German-Italian operatic soprano (born 1968)

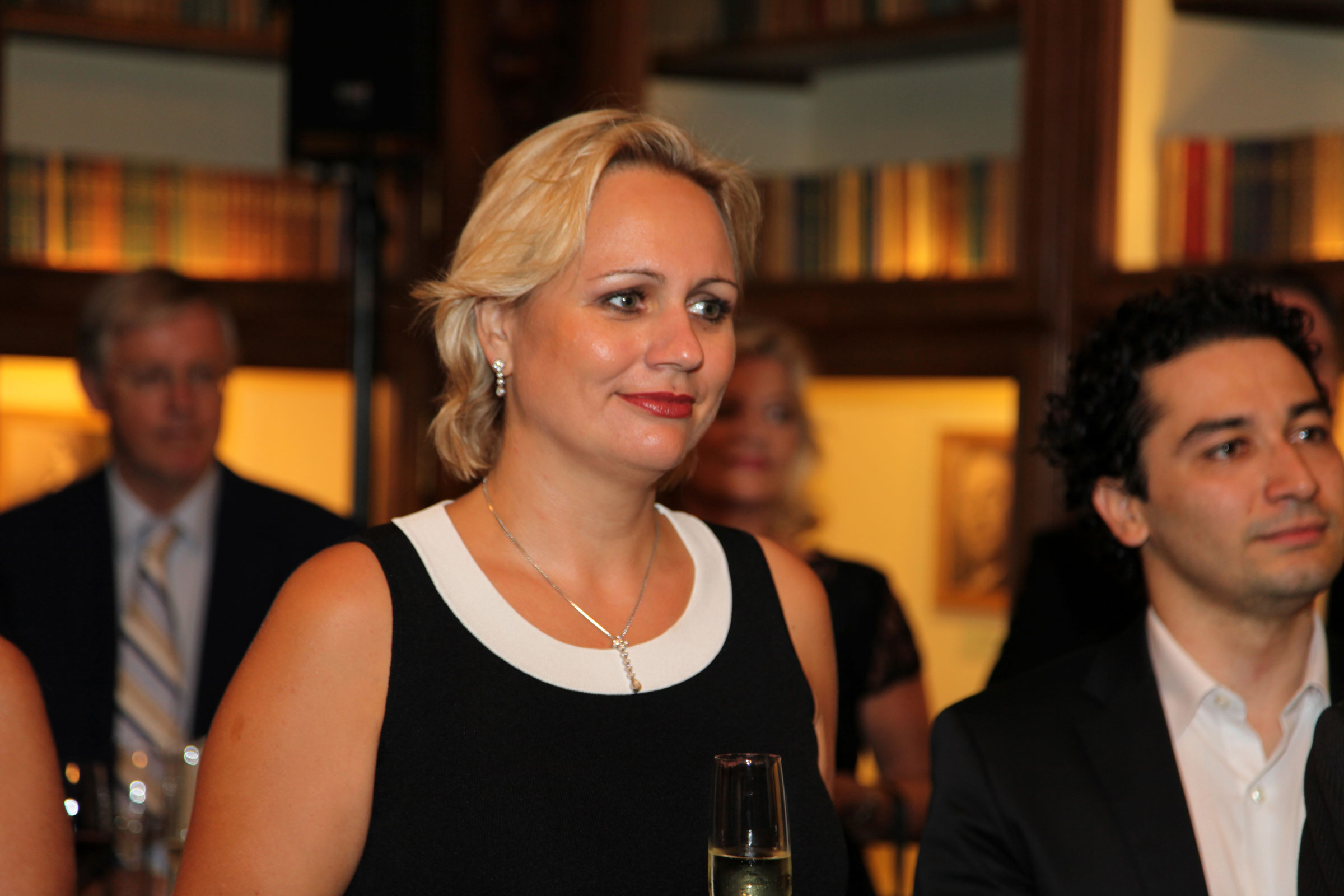
Kampe in 2010

Anja Kampe (born 1968) is a German-Italian operatic soprano. She is notable for her performances in major opera houses of the works of Richard Wagner and other German and Austrian composers.

== Career ==
Kampe was born in Zella-Mehlis, Thuringia, then GDR, and first studied in Dresden. She moved to Italy, where she studied further in Turin, with Elio Battaglia, and where she made her professional debut in 1991 in a production of Hänsel und Gretel. She sang the roles of Freia in Wagner's Das Rheingold and Gerhilde in Die Walküre at the Bayreuth Festival in 2002, Leonore in Beethoven's Fidelio with the Glyndebourne Festival Opera (2006) and at the Los Angeles Opera (2007), the title role of Ariadne auf Naxos by Richard Strauss at the Teatro Real in Madrid in 2006, and Sieglinde in Die Walküre alongside Plácido Domingo at the Washington National Opera in 2003 and 2007. In 2009 she returned to Glyndebourne as Isolde in Wagner's Tristan und Isolde, and in April 2010 she sang in the American premiere of Franz Schreker's Die Gezeichneten at the Los Angeles Opera. In June the same year, she appeared as Elisabeth in Wagner's Tannhäuser at the Vienna State Opera. In March 2012, she was again Sieglinde, in the new production of Die Walküre at the Bavarian State Opera in Munich.

In 2010 she was nominated for a Laurence Olivier Award for her performance of Senta in Wagner's Der fliegende Holländer at the Royal Opera House.

On 19 January 2018, she was awarded the coveted title of Kammersänger in a ceremony on stage at the National Theater in Munich after a performance of Die Walküre in the role of Sieglinde.
