= Hildegard Hillebrecht =

German operatic soprano

Hildegard Hillebrecht (26 November 1925 – 7 October 2018) was a German operatic soprano.

== Career ==
Born in Hanover, Hillebrecht studied singing after attending medical school and made her in the role of Leonora in Verdi's Il trovatore. She sang at the Zürich Opera House from 1952-1954, in Düsseldorf from 1954 to 1959 and at the Bayerische Staatsoper from 1961. She performed regularly at the Deutsche Oper Berlin and participated in many festivals including Salzburg and Munich.

Among Hillebrecht's commercial recordings are Strauss's Ariadne auf Naxos (with Jess Thomas, conducted by Karl Böhm, 1969) and Busoni's Doktor Faust (with Dietrich Fischer-Dieskau and William Cochran, 1969), both on Deutsche Grammophon.

=== Commercial videography ===
- Strauss: Ariadne auf Naxos (Grist, Jurinac, Thomas; Böhm, Rennert, 1965) [live]
