= Kenzaburō Ōe =

Japanese writer (1935–2023)

- 大江 健三郎
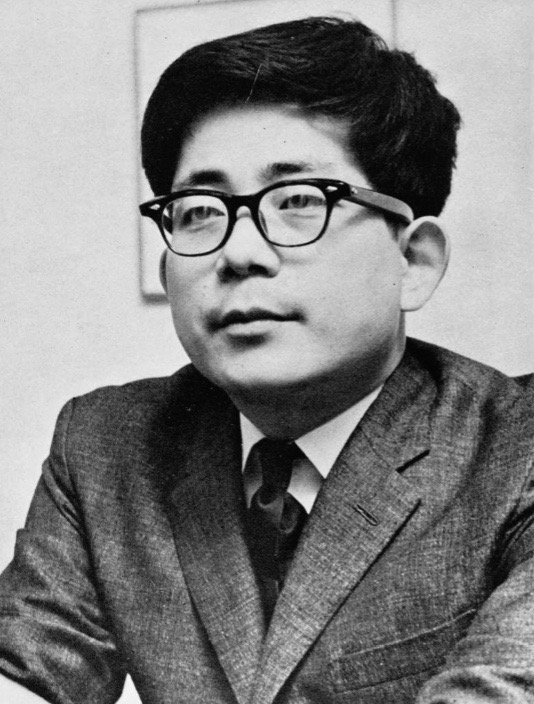
- Ōe in 1962
- Born: 31 January 1935; Ōse, Ehime, Japan
- Died: 3 March 2023 (aged 88)
- Education: University of Tokyo
- Occupations: Novelist; short-story writer; essayist
- Spouse: Yukari Ikeuchi (m. 1960)
- Children: 3, including Hikari
- Relatives: Mansaku Itami (father-in-law); Juzo Itami (brother-in-law)
- Writing career
- Period: 1957–2013
- Notable works: A Personal Matter (1964); The Silent Cry (1967)
- Notable awards: Nobel Prize in Literature (1994)

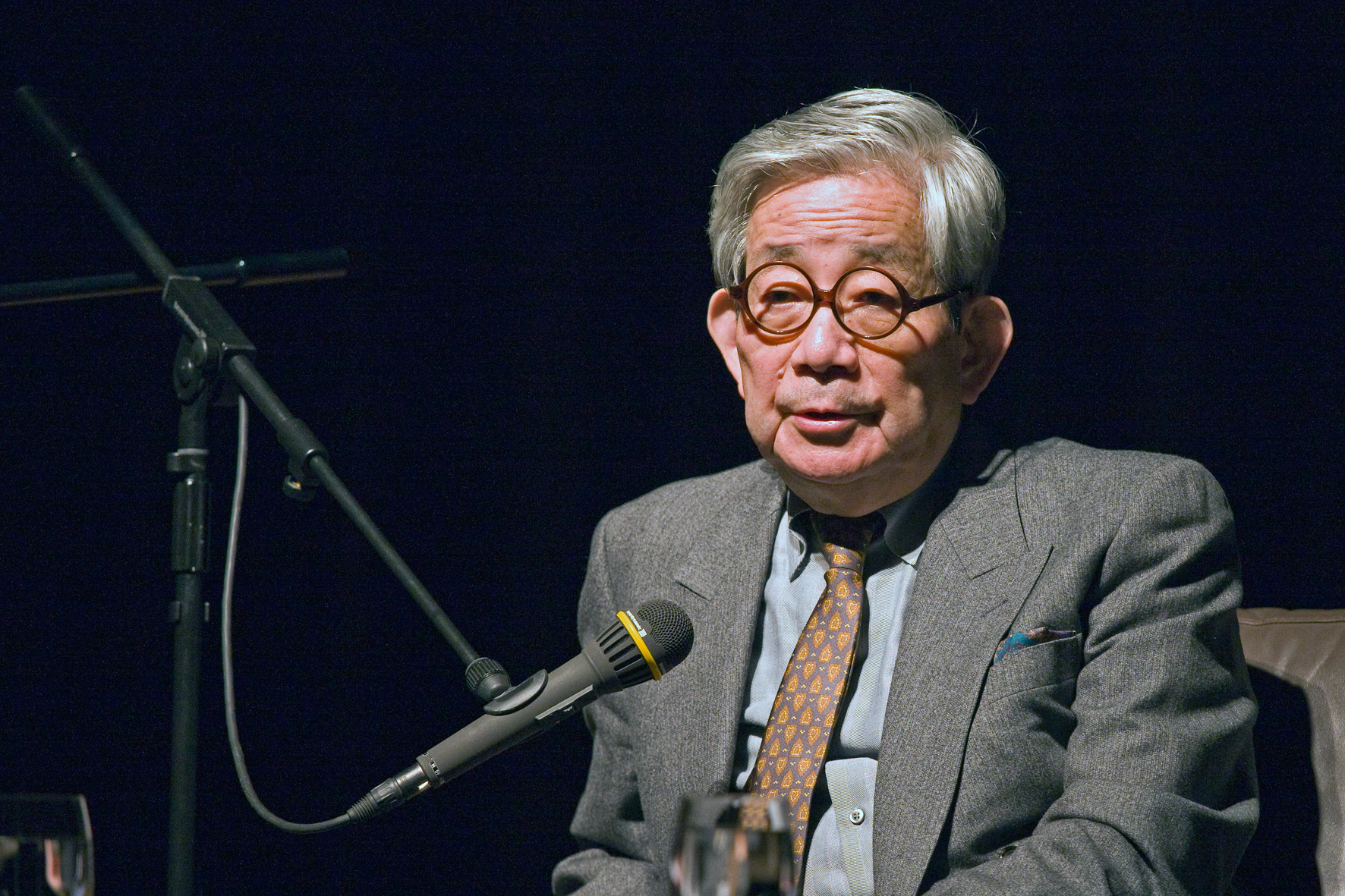
Ōe at the Japanisches Kulturinstitut in Cologne on 4 November 2008

Kenzaburō Ōe (大江 健三郎, Ōe Kenzaburō; 31 January 1935 – 3 March 2023) was a Japanese writer and a major figure in contemporary Japanese literature. His novels, short stories and essays, strongly influenced by French and American literature and literary theory, deal with political, social and philosophical issues, including nuclear weapons, nuclear power, social non-conformism, and existentialism. Ōe was awarded the 1994 Nobel Prize in Literature for creating "an imagined world, where life and myth condense to form a disconcerting picture of the human predicament today".

== Early life and education ==
Ōe was born in Ōse (大瀬村, Ōse-mura), a village now in Uchiko, Ehime Prefecture, on Shikoku. The third of seven children, he grew up listening to his grandmother, a storyteller of myths and folklore, who also recounted the oral history of the two uprisings in the region before and after the Meiji Restoration. His father, Kōtare Ōe, had a bark-stripping business; the bark was used to make paper currency. After his father died in the Pacific War in 1944, his mother, Koseki, became the driving force behind his education, buying him books including The Adventures of Huckleberry Finn and The Wonderful Adventures of Nils, which had a formative influence on him.

Ōe received the first ten years of his education in local public schools. He started school during the peak of militarism in Japan; in class, he was forced to pronounce his loyalty to Emperor Hirohito, who his teacher claimed was a god. After the war, he realized he had been taught lies and felt betrayed. This sense of betrayal later appeared in his writing.

Ōe attended high school in Matsuyama from 1951 to 1953, where he excelled as a student. At the age of 18, he made his first trip to Tokyo, where he studied at a prep school (yobikō) for one year. The following year, he began studying French Literature at the University of Tokyo with Professor Kazuo Watanabe, a specialist on François Rabelais.

== Career ==
Ōe began publishing stories in 1957, while still a student, strongly influenced by contemporary writing in France and the United States. He was particularly influenced by the writings of Jean-Paul Sartre. His first work to be published was "Lavish are the Dead", a short story set in Tokyo during the American occupation, which appeared in Bungakukai literary magazine. His early works were set in his own university milieu.

In 1958, his short story "Shiiku" (飼育) was awarded the prestigious Akutagawa Prize. The work was about a black GI set upon by Japanese youth, and was later made into a film, The Catch by Nagisa Oshima in 1961. Another early novella, later translated as Nip the Buds, Shoot the Kids, focused on young children living in Arcadian transformations of Ōe's own rural Shikoku childhood. Ōe identified these child figures as belonging to the 'child god' archetype of Jung and Kerényi, which is characterised by abandonment, hermaphrodism, invincibility, and association with beginning and end. The first two characteristics are present in these early stories, while the latter two features come to the fore in the 'idiot boy' stories which appeared after the birth of his son Hikari.

Between 1958 and 1961 Ōe published a series of works incorporating sexual metaphors for the occupation of Japan. He summarised the common theme of these stories as "the relationship of a foreigner as the big power [Z], a Japanese who is more or less placed in a humiliating position [X], and, sandwiched between the two, the third party [Y] (sometimes a prostitute who caters only to foreigners or an interpreter)". In each of these works, the Japanese X is inactive, failing to take the initiative to resolve the situation and showing no psychological or spiritual development. The graphically sexual nature of this group of stories prompted a critical outcry; Ōe said of the culmination of the series Our Times, "I personally like this novel [because] I do not think I will ever write another novel which is filled only with sexual words."

In 1961, Ōe's novellas Seventeen and The Death of a Political Youth were published in the Japanese literary magazine Bungakukai. Both were inspired by seventeen-year-old Yamaguchi Otoya, who had assassinated Japan Socialist Party chairman Inejirō Asanuma in October 1960, and then killed himself in prison three weeks later. Yamaguchi had admirers among the extreme right wing who were angered by The Death of a Political Youth and both Ōe and the magazine received death threats day and night for weeks. The magazine soon apologized to offended readers, but Ōe did not, and he was later physically assaulted by an angry right-winger while giving a speech at the University of Tokyo.

Ōe's next phase moved away from sexual content, shifting this time toward the violent fringes of society. The works which he published between 1961 and 1964 are influenced by existentialism and picaresque literature, populated with more or less criminal rogues and anti-heroes whose position on the fringes of society allows them to make pointed criticisms of it. Ōe's admission that Mark Twain's Huckleberry Finn is his favorite book can be said to find a context in this period.

=== Influence of Hikari ===
Book cover of the 1996 English version of Kenzaburō Ōe's book about his handicapped son and their life as a family.

Ōe credited his son Hikari for influencing his literary career. Ōe tried to give his son a "voice" through his writing. Several of Ōe's books feature a character based on his son.

In Ōe's 1964 book, A Personal Matter, the writer describes the psychological trauma involved in accepting his brain-damaged son into his life. Hikari figures prominently in many of the books singled out for praise by the Nobel committee, and his life is the core of the first book published after Ōe was awarded the Nobel Prize. The 1996 book, A Healing Family, is a memoir written as a collection of essays.

=== 2006 to 2008 ===
In 2005, two retired Japanese military officers sued Ōe for libel for his 1970 book of essays, Okinawa Notes, in which he had written that members of the Japanese military had coerced masses of Okinawan civilians into committing suicide during the Allied invasion of the island in 1945. In March 2008, the Osaka District Court dismissed all charges against Ōe. In this ruling, Judge Toshimasa Fukami stated, "The military was deeply involved in the mass suicides". In a news conference following the trial, Ōe said, "The judge accurately read my writing."

Ōe did not write much during the nearly two years (2006–2008) of his libel case. He began writing a new novel, which The New York Times reported would feature a character "based on his father," a staunch supporter of the imperial system who drowned in a flood during World War II. Death by Water was published in 2009.

=== 2013 ===
Bannen Yoshikishu, his final novel, is the sixth in a series with the main character of Kogito Choko, who can be considered Ōe's literary alter ego. The novel is also in a sense a culmination of the I-novels that Ōe continued to write since his son was born developmentally disabled in 1963. In the novel, Choko loses interest in the novel he had been writing when the Great East Japan earthquake and tsunami struck the Tohoku region on 11 March 2011. Instead, he begins writing about an age of catastrophe, as well as about the fact that he himself was approaching his late 70s.

== Activism ==
In 1959 and 1960, Ōe participated in the Anpo protests against the U.S.-Japan Security Treaty as a member of a group of young writers, artists, and composers called the "Young Japan Society" (Wakai Nihon no Kai). The treaty allowed the United States to maintain military bases in Japan, and Ōe's disappointment at the failure of the protests to stop the treaty shaped his future writing.

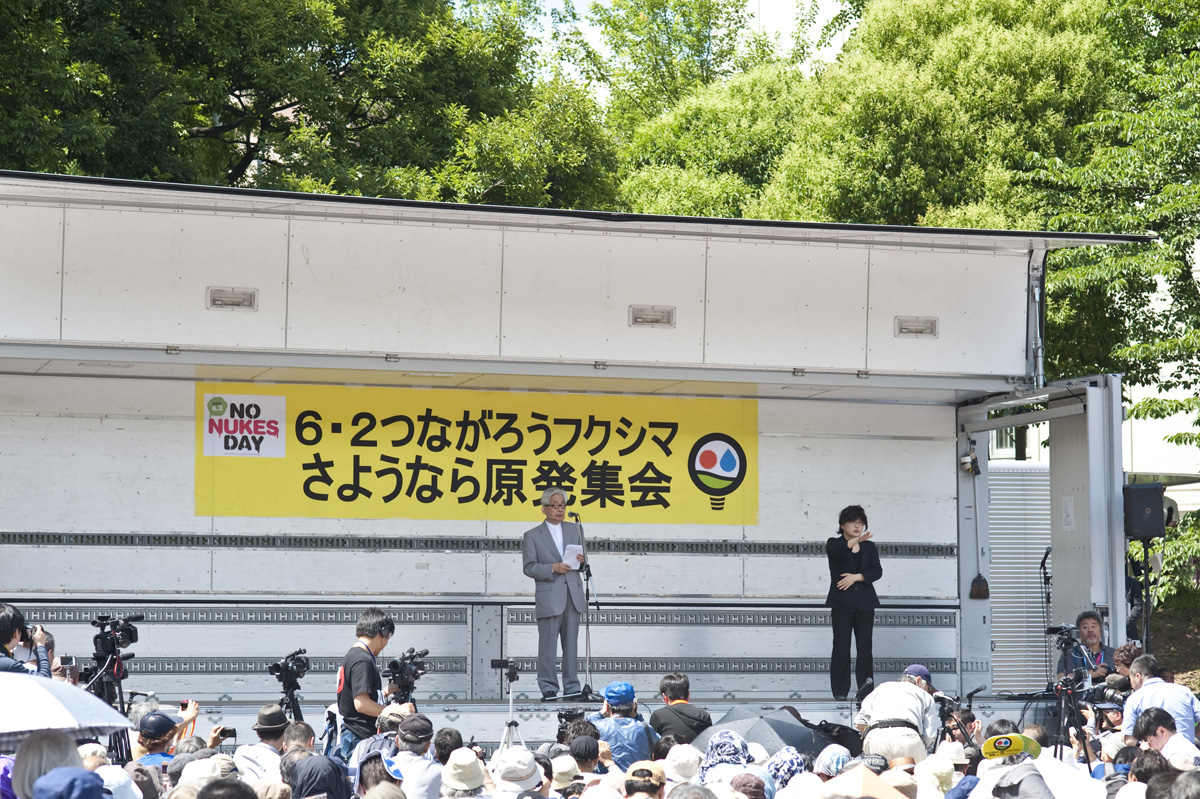
Ōe at a 2013 antinuclear demonstration in Tokyo

Ōe was involved with pacifist and anti-nuclear campaigns and wrote books regarding the atomic bombings of Hiroshima and Nagasaki and the Hibakusha, most prominently the essay collection Hiroshima Notes (1965). After meeting prominent American anti-nuclear activist Noam Chomsky at a Harvard degree ceremony, Ōe began his correspondence with Chomsky by sending him a copy of his Okinawa Notes. While also discussing Ōe's Okinawa Notes, Chomsky's reply included a story from his childhood. Chomsky wrote that when he first heard about the atomic bombing of Hiroshima, he could not bear it being celebrated, and he went in the woods and sat alone until the evening. Ōe later said in an interview, "I've always respected Chomsky, but I respected him even more after he told me that."

In a 2007 interview with The Paris Review, Ōe described himself as an anarchist. Stating: "In principle, I am an anarchist. Kurt Vonnegut once said he was an agnostic who respects Jesus Christ. I am an anarchist who loves democracy."

Following the 2011 Fukushima nuclear disaster, he urged Prime Minister Yoshihiko Noda to "halt plans to restart nuclear power plants and instead abandon nuclear energy". Ōe said Japan has an "ethical responsibility" to abandon nuclear power in the aftermath of the Fukushima nuclear disaster, just as it renounced war under its postwar Constitution. He called for "an immediate end to nuclear power generation and warned that Japan would suffer another nuclear catastrophe if it tries to resume nuclear power plant operations". In 2013, he organized a mass demonstration in Tokyo against nuclear power. Ōe also criticized moves to amend Article 9 of the Constitution, which forever renounces war.

In 2015, Ōe stated that he believed that the Japanese government had not adequately acknowledged or apologized for the comfort women issue.

== Personal life and death ==
Ōe married in February 1960. His wife, Yukari, was the daughter of film director Mansaku Itami and sister of film director Juzo Itami. The same year he met Mao Zedong on a trip to China. He also went to Russia and Europe the following year, visiting Sartre in Paris.

Ōe lived in Tokyo and had three children. In 1963, his eldest son, Hikari, was born with a brain hernia. Ōe initially struggled to accept his son's condition, which required surgery which would leave him with learning disabilities for life. Hikari lived with Kenzaburō and Yukari until he was middle-aged, and often composed music in the same room where his father was writing.

Ōe died on 3 March 2023 at the age of 88, reportedly due to old age.

== Honors ==
=== Nobel Prize in Literature and Japan's Order of Culture ===
In 1994 Ōe won the Nobel Prize in Literature and was named to receive Japan's Order of Culture. He refused the latter because it is bestowed by the Emperor. Ōe said, "I do not recognize any authority, any value, higher than democracy." Once again, he received threats.

Shortly after learning that he had been awarded the Nobel Prize, Ōe said that he was encouraged by the Swedish Academy's recognition of modern Japanese literature, and hoped that it would inspire other writers. He told The New York Times that his writing was ultimately focused on "the dignity of human beings."

=== Major awards ===
- Tokyo University May Festival Prize, 1957.
- Akutagawa Prize, 1958.
- Shinchosha Literary Prize, 1964.
- Tanizaki Prize, 1967.
- Noma Prize, 1973.
- Yomiuri Prize, 1982.
- Jiro Osaragi Prize (Asahi Shimbun), 1983.
- Nobel Prize in Literature, 1994.
- Order of Culture, 1994 – refused.
- Knight of the Legion of Honour (France, 2002).
- Commander of the Order of Arts and Letters (France, 2012)

=== Eponymous literary prize ===
In 2005, the Kenzaburō Ōe Prize was established by publisher Kodansha to promote Japanese literary novels internationally, with the first prize awarded in 2007. The winning work was selected solely by Ōe, to be translated into English, French, or German, and published worldwide.

== Selected works ==
The number of Kenzaburō Ōe's works translated into English and other languages remains limited, so that much of his literary output is still only available in Japanese. The few translations have often appeared after a marked lag in time. Works of his have also been translated into Chinese, Catalan, French, and German.

Year	Japanese Title	English Title	Comments	Ref.
1957	死者の奢り; Shisha no ogori	Lavish Are The Dead	Short story published in Bungakukai literary magazine	
1957	奇妙な仕事; Kimyō na shigoto	The Strange Work	Short novel awarded May Festival Prize by University of Tokyo newspaper	
1957	飼育; Shiiku	"The Catch" / "Prize Stock"	Short story awarded the Akutagawa prize. Published in English as "Prize Stock" in Teach Us to Outgrow Our Madness (1977) and as "The Catch" in "The Catch and Other War Stories" (Kodansha International 1981). Made into a film in 1961 by Nagisa Oshima and in 2011 by the Cambodian director Rithy Panh.	
1958	見るまえに跳べ; Miru mae ni tobe	Leap Before You Look	Short story; title is a reference to W. H. Auden	
1958	芽むしり仔撃ち; Memushiri kouchi	Nip the Buds, Shoot the Kids	One of his earliest novellas, translated in 1995	
1961	セヴンティーン; Sevuntiin	Seventeen	Short novel translated by Luk Van Haute in 1996. The sequel was so controversial that Ōe never allowed it to be republished.	
1963	叫び声; Sakebigoe	Outcries	Untranslated	
1963	性的人間; Seiteki ningen	J (published title) Sexual Humans (literal translation)	Short story translated by Luk Van Haute in 1996	
1964	空の怪物アグイー; Sora no kaibutsu Aguī	Aghwee the Sky Monster	Short story translated by John Nathan.	
1964	個人的な体験; Kojinteki na taiken	A Personal Matter	Awarded the Shinchosha Literary Prize. Translated by John Nathan.	
1965	ヒロシマ・ノート; Hiroshima nōto	Hiroshima Notes	Collection of essays translated by Toshi Yonezawa and edited by David L. Swain	
1967	万延元年のフットボール; Man'en gan'nen no futtobōru	The Silent Cry (published title) Football in the Year 1860 (literal translation)	Translated by John Bester	
1969	われらの狂気を生き延びる道を教えよ; Warera no kyōki wo ikinobiru michi wo oshieyo	Teach Us to Outgrow Our Madness	Translated by John Nathan in 1977; title is a reference to W. H. Auden	
1970	沖縄ノート; Okinawa nōto	Okinawa Notes	Collection of essays that became the target of a defamation lawsuit filed in 2005 which was dismissed in 2008	
1972	鯨の死滅する日; Kujira no shimetsu suru hi	The Day the Whales Shall be Annihilated	Collection of essays including "The Continuity of Norman Mailer"	
1972	みずから我が涙をぬぐいたまう日; Mizukara waga namida wo nuguitamau hi	The Day He Himself Shall Wipe My Tears Away	Short novel parodying Yukio Mishima; translated by John Nathan and published in the volume Teach Us to Outgrow Our Madness	
1973	洪水はわが魂に及び; Kōzui wa waga tamashii ni oyobi	My Deluged Soul	Awarded the 26th Noma Literary Prize. Work has also been referred to as The Waters Are Come in unto My Soul.	
1976	ピンチランナー調書; Pinchi ran'nā chōsho	The Pinch Runner Memorandum	Translated by Michiko N. Wilson and Michael K. Wilson	
1979	同時代ゲーム; Dōjidai gēmu	The Game of Contemporaneity	Untranslated	
1982	「雨の木」を聴く女たち; Rein tsurī wo kiku on'natachi	Women Listening to the "Rain Tree"	Collection of two short stories and three novellas. Awarded the 34th Yomiuri Literary Prize for novels.	
1983	新しい人よ眼ざめよ; Atarashii hito yo, mezameyo	Rouse Up O Young Men of the New Age!	Collection of seven short stories originally published in Gunzo and Shincho magazines between 1982 and 1983. The title is taken from the preface to the poem Milton by William Blake. Awarded the 10th Jiro Osaragi Prize. Translated by John Nathan.	
1985	河馬に嚙まれる; Kaba ni kamareru	Bitten by a Hippopotamus	Eight short stories, loosely linked	
1986	M/Tと森のフシギの物語; M/T to mori no fushigi no monogatari	M/T and the Wonder of the Forest	Title has also been translated as Strange Stories of M/T and the Forest	
1987	懐かしい年への手紙; Natsukashī toshi e no tegami	Letters to the Time/Space of Fond Memories	Autobiographical novel	
1988	「最後の小説」 Saigo no shōsetsu	The Last Novel	Collection of essays	
1989	人生の親戚; Jinsei no shinseki	An Echo of Heaven (published title) Relatives of Life (literal translation)	Translated by Margaret Mitsutani	
1990	治療塔; Chiryō tō	Towers of Healing	Novel first serialized in Hermes magazine; first work of science fiction	
1990	静かな生活; Shizuka na seikatsu	A Quiet Life	Translated by Kunioki Yanagishita & William Wetherall	
1991	治療塔惑星; Chiryō tō wakusei	Planet of the Healing Tower	Science fiction novel paired with Chiryō tō	
1992	僕が本当に若かった頃; Boku ga hontō ni wakakatta koro	When I Was Really Young	Volume of nine vignettes, many of which refer to his previous works	
1993	「救い主」が殴られるまで 'Sukuinushi' ga nagurareru made	Until the Savior Gets Beaten	Part I of The Burning Green Tree Trilogy (燃えあがる緑の木 第一部, Moeagaru midori no ki – dai ichibu)	
1994	揺れ動く (ヴァシレーション); Yureugoku (Vashirēshon)	Vacillation	Part II of The Burning Green Tree Trilogy (燃えあがる緑の木 第二部, Moeagaru midori no ki – dai nibu)	
1995	大いなる日に; Ōinaru hi ni	For the Day of Grandeur	Part III of The Burning Green Tree Trilogy (燃えあがる緑の木 第三部, Moeagaru midori no ki – dai sanbu)	
1995	曖昧な日本の私; Aimai na Nihon no watashi	Japan, the Ambiguous, and Myself	Nobel Prize acceptance speech; the title is a reference to Yasunari Kawabata's Nobel acceptance speech, "Japan, the Beautiful, and Myself". In 1995, nine lectures given by Ōe in the 1990s were published in the same volume with this title.	
1995	恢復する家族; Kaifukusuru kazoku	A Healing Family	Collection of essays serialized from 1990 to 1995 in Sawarabi, a journal on rehabilitative medicine, with an afterword and drawings by Yukari Oe. Adapted and translated in 1996 by Stephen Snyder.	
1999	宙返り; Chūgaeri	Somersault	Translated by Philip Gabriel	
2000	取り替え子 (チェンジリング); Torikae ko (Chenjiringu)	The Changeling	Translated by Deborah Boliver Boehm	
2001	「自分の木」の下で 'Jibun no ki' no shita de	Under One's Own Tree	16 essays reflecting on Ōe's childhood and experience as a novelist and father	
2002	憂い顔の童子; Urei gao no dōji	Gloomy Faced Child	Novel	
2007	臈たしアナベル・リイ 総毛立ちつ身まかりつ; Rōtashi Anaberu Rī sōkedachitsu mimakaritsu	The Beautiful Annabel Lee was Chilled and Killed	Winner of the 2008 Weishanhu Award for Best Foreign Novel in the 21st Century.	
2009	水死; Sui shi	Death by Water	Translated by Deborah Boliver Boehm	
2013	晩年様式集(イン・レイト・スタイル); Bannen Yōshiki shū (In Reito Sutairu)	In Late Style	Final work. Title is a reference to Edward Said's On Late Style.	

== See also ==
- List of Japanese Nobel laureates
- List of Nobel laureates affiliated with the University of Tokyo
- Anti-nuclear power movement in Japan
- Relocation of Marine Corps Air Station Futenma
- Anarchism in Japan
