= Heinz Kruse =

German opera singer (1940–2008)

Heinz Kruse (29 August 1940 – 29 July 2008) was a German opera singer (tenor).

== Career ==
Born in Schleswig, Kruse first sang in a children's choir and completed an apprenticeship with a health insurance company. He began his singing career in the chorus at the theater in Hof, then at Stadttheater Bern and from 1966 to 1968 at Staatstheater Stuttgart. In 1968 he was engaged as a tenor for comic roles at the Theater Basel. His next contract was with the Staatsoper Hannover in 1970, where he celebrated his first great successes in buffo and character roles. He sang Pedrillo in Die Entführung aus dem Serail, Wenzel in Die verkaufte Braut, the Witch in Hänsel und Gretel, David in Die Meistersinger von Nürnberg and numerous other roles. Guest appearances led him to the Paris Opera as Pedrillo in 1978, to Toulouse opera as David in 1979 and to the Bayreuth Festival in 1977, where he played small roles in Tristan and Parsifal. In 1986 he took part in the premiere of Hans-Jürgen von Bose's Die Leiden des jungen Werthers at the Schwetzinger Festspiele.

From 1987 he sang as a heldentenor, in roles such as Florestan in Fidelio (Staatstheater Mainz 1988), Erik in The Flying Dutchman (Staatsoper Berlin 1991), the title role in Parsifal (Staatstheater Braunschweig 1988/89), Loge in Das Rheingold (Staatsoper Hannover 1991, Hamburg 1992), Siegmund in Die Walküre (Hanover 1991), Tristan (Theater Kiel 1991, Hamburgische Staatsoper 1996, Deutsche Oper Berlin 1996) and the Kaiser in Die Frau ohne Schatten (Braunschweig 1992, Semperoper Dresden 1996) as well as Walther von Stolzing in the Meistersinger (Badisches Staatstheater Karlsruhe 1992–93).

A highlight of his singing career in Hamburg in 1993 was the title role in Siegfried, which he also sang at the Deutsche Oper Berlin in 1995, at the Théâtre du Châtelet in Paris in 1994–95 and in the Aalto Theatre in Essen in 1996. During his appearance as Siegfried at Het Muziektheater in Amsterdam in 1998, he fell after his fight with the dragon and dislocated his arm; the performance had to be stopped. In 2000 he also sang this role at the Vienna State Opera.

His stage repertoire also included Cassio in Otello, Hans in The Bartered Bride, Matteo in Arabella (Hamburg 1990), Andrej Chowansky in Chowanschtschina (Hamburg 1994) and Albi in Der Schatzgräber (Hamburg 1989). In 1990 he made a guest appearance at Opernhaus Leipzig as Max in Krenek's Jonny spielt auf. In addition, he appeared as an oratorio and song singer, for example regularly in the Hauptkirche St. Nikolai in Hamburg, where he could be heard mainly as the Evangelist in Johann Sebastian Bach's Christmas Oratorio, St Matthew Passion and St John Passion.

In 2000, Kruse suffered a stroke that ended his career. His daughter, Svenja Kruse, whom he taught, now works as a soprano. His son Björn Kruse (born in 1968) works as an opera and theatre director. Kruse inspired critics and audiences with his beautiful and expressive voice. His clear articulation resulted in a special comprehensibility of words.

== Bibliography ==
- Karl-Josef Kutsch, Leo Riemens: Großes Sängerlexikon 3rd ed. K. G. Saur, Munich 1999, vol. 3, p. 1929.
