= The Game of Contemporaneity =

1979 novel by Kenzaburō Ōe

Dōjidai Gemu
- First edition
- Author: Kenzaburō Ōe
- Original title: 同時代ゲーム (Dōjidai Gemu)
- Language: Japanese
- Publisher: Shinchō Bunko
- Publication date: 1979
- Publication place: Japan
- Media type: Print
- Pages: 493
- OCLC: 834763107
- LC Class: PL858.E14 D6

Dōjidai gēmu (Japanese: 同時代ゲーム), variously translated as The Game of Contemporaneity, Coeval Games or Contemporary Games, is a 1979 novel by the Japanese writer Kenzaburō Ōe.

== Background ==
The novel was originally inspired by Diego Rivera's mural "Dream of a Sunday Afternoon in the Central Alameda Park". Oe's approach to history and story-telling expounds the themes of simultaneity, ambiguity and complexity. The story centres around the alternative world of dissident samurai, as opposed to that of the Emperor. The samurai turn into demons after being chased into the forest. The story of the village serves as a microcosm of the history of Japan as a whole. It has its own creation myth and fertility goddess, as well as a composite healer/trickster called The One Who Destroys. Although the novel expounds the themes of marginalisation and outsiderhood, it also provides hope for a new beginning. This emphasizes the central theme of the novel: simultaneous ambiguity, in the amalgamation of past and present, fact and dream, as well as history and myth. Oe uses satire, parody and black humour to describe the many deeds and events of the samurai. This culminates in the Fifty-Day War, in which the samurai and the imperial army battle one another, with The One Who Destroys leading the battle against The No-Name Captain of the imperial guard. It ends with the samurai surrendering to avoid the destruction of the forest (mori). The word mori is ambivalent in that in Japanese it conjures an image of regeneration or rebirth, but in Latin (an entirely unrelated language) it stands for death.

== Style ==
This novel has been considered as a main example of the current of magic realism in Japanese literature. Other Japanese authors with considerable literary contributions to this genre are: Abe Kobo, Yasunari Kawabata and Yasushi Inoue.

The novel is known for its difficult, complex style. Japanese literary critic Hideo Kobayashi wrote that he "stopped on page 2."
