= Deborah Boliver Boehm =

Journalist, travel writer, editor and translator

- Occupations: Journalist, travel writer, editor

Deborah Boliver Boehm is a journalist, travel writer, editor and the former editor of Eastwest magazine. She also works as a translator. Boehm moved to Japan to attend college in Kyoto in 1970. She was a student of Japanese language and culture and wanted to continue her education. She writes horror and supernatural based in Japanese folklore while she is the translator for Kenzaburō Ōe, the winner of the 1994 Nobel Prize for Literature. She also translates for Mariko Koike who writes detective and horror fiction. Boehm now lives in Santa Fe, New Mexico.

== Bibliography ==
- Ghost of a Smile
- A Zen Romance: One Woman's Adventures In A Monastery

=== Translations ===
- The Tattoo Murder Case
- The Cat in the Coffin
- Death by Water
- The Graveyard Apartment
