= John Nathan =

American translator, writer, filmmaker, and Japanologist

- Born: John Weil Nathan; March 1940 (age 86); New York City, New York, U.S.
- Occupations: Translator; writer; scholar; filmmaker
- Years active: 1960s–present
- Known for: Japanese translations and cultural studies
- Spouses: Mayumi Oda (m. 1962, divorced) Diane Siegelman (m. 1984)
- Children: 4

Academic background
- Education: Harvard University; University of Tokyo

John Weil Nathan (born March 1940) is an American translator, writer, scholar, filmmaker, and Japanologist. His translations from Japanese into English include the works of Yukio Mishima, Kenzaburō Ōe, Kōbō Abe, and Natsume Sōseki. Nathan is also an Emmy Award-winning producer, writer and director of several films about Japanese culture and society and American business. He is Professor Emeritus of Japanese Cultural Studies at the University of California, Santa Barbara.

== Early life ==
Nathan was born in New York City and spent part of his childhood in Tucson, Arizona. He was born into a non-practicing Jewish family. His father was a painter, and his grandfather was a reporter at The Jewish Daily Forward. In 1961, Nathan graduated from Harvard College, where he studied under Edwin O. Reischauer.

== Career ==
The summer after graduation, he worked at Nomura Securities in New York. He moved to Japan directly after, teaching English as a second language to native Japanese speakers at a newly opened English conversation school in Tokyo that had been funded by the Ford Foundation. He was also hired to teach English literature at Tsuda College, a school for young women. Nathan became the first American to pass the entrance exams of the University of Tokyo and be admitted as a traditional student. He lived in Tokyo for close to five years and departed Japan in 1966 to start a PhD program at Columbia University in New York. He dropped out of Columbia and began teaching a class in modern Japanese literature at Princeton University. In September 1968, Nathan moved to Cambridge, Massachusetts, where he had been appointed a junior fellow in the Society of Fellows at Harvard University. The status the society conferred allowed Nathan to undergo oral examinations in candidacy for a PhD without having attended graduate school. Nathan would eventually receive a doctorate in Far Eastern languages from Harvard. Nathan accepted a full-time teaching appointment at Princeton University in 1972, resigning from the position in 1979. Nathan is currently Professor Emeritus of Japanese Cultural Studies at the University of California, Santa Barbara (UCSB). He previously served as the Koichi Takashima Professor of Japanese Cultural Studies at UCSB.

Nathan's works focus on Japanese culture, Japanese literature, Japanese cinema, the theory and practice of translation, and the sociology of business culture. Nathan first met Yukio Mishima in 1963. In 1965, at the age of 25, Nathan translated Mishima's The Sailor Who Fell from Grace with the Sea. Impressed by Nathan's translation, Mishima requested Nathan sign on as his translator and help Mishima in his quest in being awarded the Nobel Prize in Literature. Nathan was more interested in translating the work of Kenzaburō Ōe. Nathan ultimately refused to translate Mishima's 1964 novel Kinu to Meisatsu (絹と明察), opting instead to translate Kenzaburō Ōe's 1964 novel Kojinteki na Taiken (個人的な体験). Mishima, who was considered an "arch-rival" of Ōe, abruptly severed ties with Nathan afterwards. In 1974, Nathan authored Mishima: A Biography (1974), a biography of Yukio Mishima. In 1994, Kenzaburō Ōe was awarded the Nobel Prize in Literature and Nathan accompanied him to Stockholm.

In 1972, Nathan provided the script for Hiroshi Teshigahara's film Summer Soldiers, about U.S. Army deserters seeking refuge in Japan. He left Princeton in the late 1970s to pursue filmmaking and created three documentaries about the Japanese.

In 1999, Nathan published Sony: The Private Life, a biography of Sony Corporation. The book was the product of 115 interviews conducted by Nathan with current and past key executives of Sony. In 2004, he published Japan Unbound: A Volatile Nation's Quest for Pride and Purpose, a scholarly work which provides a historical context to contemporary Japan. In 2008, Nathan published his memoir, Living Carelessly in Tokyo and Elsewhere. In 2013, Nathan published a translation of Natsume Sōseki's unfinished novel Light and Dark. In 2018, Nathan published a biography of Sōseki titled Sōseki: Modern Japan's Greatest Novelist.

== Reception ==
Nathan was described by Damian Flanagan in The Japan Times as "the one critic of Japanese literature that towers above the rest."

== Personal life ==
Nathan married Japanese artist Mayumi Oda in 1962, in a Shinto wedding ceremony at the Prince Hotel in Akasaka. They had two sons, but separated after several years of marriage. In 1984, Nathan married Diane Siegelman, with whom he has a daughter and a son.

== Works ==
=== Translations ===
==== Novels ====
- Mishima, Yukio (1965). The Sailor Who Fell from Grace with the Sea. New York: Alfred A. Knopf. ISBN 978-0-399-50489-1.
- Ōe, Kenzaburō (1968). A Personal Matter. New York: Grove Press.
- Ōe, Kenzaburō (1977). Teach Us to Outgrow Our Madness: Four Short Novels. New York: Grove Press. ISBN 978-0-8021-5185-8.
- Ōe, Kenzaburō (2002). Rouse Up O Young Men of the New Age!. New York: Grove Press. ISBN 978-0-8021-1710-6.
- Sōseki, Natsume (2013). Light and Dark. New York: Columbia University Press. ISBN 978-0-231-16142-8.

==== Short stories ====
- Ōe, Kenzaburō (1965). "Lavish Are the Dead". Japan Quarterly. Vol. 12, no. 2 (April–June 1965 ed.). pp. 193–211.
- Abe, Kōbō (1966). "Stick". Japan Quarterly. Vol. 13 (April–June 1966 ed.). pp. 214–217.
- Abe, Kōbō (1966). "Red Cocoon". Japan Quarterly. Vol. 13 (April–June 1966 ed.). pp. 217–219.

=== Books ===
- Mishima: A Biography. Boston: Little, Brown. 1974. ISBN 978-0-316-59844-6.
- Sony: The Private Life. Boston: Houghton Mifflin Company. 1999. ISBN 978-0-395-89327-2.
- Japan Unbound: A Volatile Nation's Quest for Pride and Purpose. Boston: Houghton Mifflin Company. 2004. ISBN 978-0-618-13894-4.
- Living Carelessly in Tokyo and Elsewhere: A Memoir. New York: Free Press. 2008. ISBN 978-1-4165-5345-8.
- A Bintel Brif: A Novel. Xlibris. 2011. ISBN 9781456857493.
- Sōseki: Modern Japan's Greatest Novelist. New York: Columbia University Press. 2018. ISBN 978-0-231-17142-7.
- "Tokyo Story: A Profile of Shintaro Ishihara". The New Yorker, April 9, 2001.
- Words, Ideas, and Ambiguities: Four Perspectives on Translating from the Japanese. Howard Hibbett, Edwin McClellan, John Nathan and Edward Seidensticker. Chicago, Ill.: Imprint Publications, 2000.
- "Kenzaburō Ōe: Mapping the Land of Dreams". Japan Quarterly 42(1), January–March, 1995.

=== Documentary film ===
- The Japanese, A Film Trilogy: Full Moon Lunch, The Blind Swordsman, Farm Song (1979); music for Farm Song written by Toru Takemitsu
- The Colonel Comes to Japan (1982, Emmy Award) – A film about KFC in Japan.
- In Search of Excellence (1985)
- Entrepreneurs (1986)
- Daimyo – The Arts of Feudal Japan (1988)

=== Screenplay ===
- Summer Soldiers (1972), dir. Hiroshi Teshigahara

== Sources ==
- Nathan, John (2008). Living Carelessly in Tokyo and Elsewhere: A Memoir. New York: Free Press. ISBN 978-1-4165-9378-2.
