= Somersault (novel) =

1999 novel by Kenzaburō Ōe

Somersault (宙返り Chūgaeri) is a 1999 novel by Kenzaburō Ōe. It is about two former leaders of a religious cult as they try to establish a new movement, a possible nuclear catastrophe, and religious sects in everyday society. It received inspiration from the Aum Shinrikyo cult and their Tokyo subway sarin attack of 1995. The English translation, by Philip Gabriel, first appeared in 2003. It was Ōe's first novel since he won the 1994 literature Nobel Prize. It was published in the United States by Grove Press. The book was published in the United Kingdom by Atlantic Books.

== Reception ==
Scott Esposito of the Los Angeles Times said that the translation "wasn't much admired by English-speaking reviewers". Christopher Tayler of The Guardian said that the "sprawling" Somersault received "widespread criticism". Publishers Weekly said "Oe [sic] has attempted to create a sprawling masterpiece, but American readers might decide there's more sprawl than masterpiece here." Steven Poole of The Guardian said, "And yet, for all its longueurs, one finishes Somersault convinced that buried within the sprawling text is a brilliant, much shorter novel. Perhaps even Nobel laureates occasionally need ruthless editing." Eric Hanson of the Star Tribune said the novel "would be an underwhelming and unsatisfying read, no matter the writer. But coming from a novelist of Oe's immense stature, it's beyond disappointing. It's depressingly sad [sic]."
