= Martin Gantner =

German operatic baritone

Martin Gantner is a German operatic baritone. He made his professional opera debut in Koblenz as Count Almaviva in The Marriage of Figaro. He soon after joined the roster of singers at the Deutsche Oper Berlin where he notably portrayed one of the gang members in the world premiere of Hans Werner Henze's Das verratene Meer in 1990; a part he reprised for his debut at La Scala. Engagements with other important houses soon followed, including the Semperoper (Dandini in La Cenerentola) and Theater Basel (Guglielmo in Così fan tutte). He has been a member of the Bavarian State Opera since 1993. Other companies with whom he has appeared as a guest artist include the Berlin State Opera, the Cologne Opera, the Deutsche Oper am Rhein, La Monnaie, the Liceu, the Los Angeles Opera, the Lyric Opera of Chicago, the Vienna State Opera, and the Zurich Opera among others.

== Sources ==
- Bio of Martin Ganter at www.losangelesopera.com
