= Nip the Buds, Shoot the Kids =

1958 novel by Kenzaburo Oe

- 1994 Kodansha reprint cover
- Author: Kenzaburō Ōe
- Audio read by: Edoardo Ballerini
- Original title: 芽むしり仔撃ち (Memushiri Kouchi)
- Translator: Paul St. John Mackintosh; Maki Sugiyama
- Language: Japanese
- Genre: War novel; Japanese literature
- Set in: Japan in World War II
- Publisher: Kodansha
- Publication date: 1958
- Publication place: Japan
- English publication date: 1995
- Media type: Print (hardcover)
- Pages: 246
- ISBN: 978-4-06-207411-7 (1994 Kodansha reprint)
- OCLC: 22848742
- Dewey Decimal: 895.6/35
- LC Class: PL858.E14 M413 1995

Nip the Buds, Shoot the Kids (Japanese: 芽むしり仔撃ち, Hepburn: Memushiri Kouchi); also known as "Pluck the Bud and Destroy the Offspring") is a 1958 novel by Japanese author Kenzaburō Ōe. It is Ōe's first novel, written when he was 23 years old.

It was originally published in 1958. It was reprinted by Kodansha on 2 November 1994. An English translation was released in 1995 by Marion Boyars Publishers.

== Plot ==
The novel deals with fifteen adolescent boys from a reformatory in World War II Japan. The boys (including the unnamed narrator and his brother) are sent to a rural village (strongly echoing the regions of Shikoku in which Ōe was raised) to live and work. Upon arrival, the boys find the village afflicted by plague, with piles of rotting animal corpses dominating the atmosphere. Soon after the boys' arrival, the villagers flee from the plague to a neighboring village, barricading the boys in and abandoning them to their fate.

The group is joined (in stages) by a Korean boy named Li, a deserter from the army, and a young girl who has been abandoned in a warehouse. The boys attempt to make the most of their situation; Li teaches them to hunt birds, resulting in a jubilant festival, and the narrator finds love with the young girl. Their situation turns after a few days, however; the girl dies of plague after being bitten by a village dog, the narrator's brother runs away into the wild forest (and is presumed dead), and the villagers eventually return and are furious with the state in which they find the village. Fearful of the repercussions should it become known that they abandoned the boys to die, they stab the deserter and alternately threaten the boys with violence and ply them with food. All members of the reformatory boys eventually agree to keep silent about the actions of the villagers, with the exception of the narrator. At the close of the novel, he is chased into the forest by the villagers to an unknown fate.

== See also ==
- 1958 in literature
- Japanese literature
