= A Personal Matter =

1964 semi-autobiographical novel by Japanese writer Kenzaburō Ōe

- Cover of the first Japanese edition
- Author: Kenzaburō Ōe
- Original title: 個人的な体験; Kojinteki na taiken
- Translator: John Nathan
- Language: Japanese
- Genre: Semi-autobiographical
- Publisher: Shinchosha
- Publication date: 1964
- Publication place: Japan
- English publication date: 1968
- Media type: Print

A Personal Matter (Japanese: 個人的な体験, Hepburn: Kojinteki na taiken; lit. "A Personal Experience") is a 1964 semi-autobiographical novel by Japanese Nobel Prize laureate author Kenzaburō Ōe. It tells the story of a young father who must come to terms with the fact that his newborn son is severely mentally disabled.

== Plot ==
The plot follows the story of Bird, a 27 year old Japanese man. The book starts with him wondering about a hypothetical trip to Africa, which is a recurrent theme in his mind throughout the story. Soon after day-dreaming about his trip and a brawl with a few local delinquents from the region, Bird receives a call from the doctor of the hospital regarding his newborn child, urging him to talk in person. After meeting with the doctor, he discovers that his son has been born with a brain hernia, although the fact is still obscure to his wife.

Bird is troubled by the revelation, and regrets having to inform the relatives of his wife about the facts concerning the state of the child, who is not expected to survive for long. Not long after, Bird meets an ex-girlfriend of his, called Himiko, who has, after her husband's suicide, become a sexual deviant and eccentric. After a short philosophical discussion, both become drunk and Bird sleeps at Himiko's, only to wake up on the morning after in a deep state of hangover from all the whisky he had drunk the day before. He vomits violently. After freshening up and readying himself for work, Bird goes to his teaching job at a cram school to teach English Literature. Whilst teaching, Bird suddenly becomes wildly nauseated and vomits in his classroom. The classmates disapprove of Bird's behaviour, claiming that he's a drunk and should be fired from his job. Bird worries that he might lose his job.

After the ordeal, he returns to the hospital, sure that his child should have died by now. When he asks the nurse concerning the baby, he is surprised to know that his child is still alive, and if still surviving after a few days, is expected to go through brain surgery, even though the prospects of him turning into a healthy normal child is non-existent. Bird struggles with this fact, and desires the child to die as soon as possible so as to not have the responsibility for the so-called "monster baby" to ruin his life and his prospects for travelling by himself to the African Continent. The internal psychological struggle that he has to go through makes him feel fear, anger and shame, towards the baby and himself.

A little while after, Bird goes to Himiko's house and begins to make love to her. However, haunted by the ordeal of his dying child, Bird is unable to achieve an erection at the mention of the word "pregnancy" and "womb" uttered by Himiko, and ends up resorting to anal sex. He feels reluctant at first, but then concedes and is able to achieve orgasm with Himiko. When he goes back to the hospital, Bird has to lie to his wife concerning the state of the baby and its cranial condition, claiming that it is an unknown organ failure that is causing the baby to suffer. He does not admit that he expects the baby's death.

Back at his cram school job, he meets one of his friendly students who wishes to claim that the vomit incident the earlier day was caused by food poisoning, and not hangover, in order for Bird have better chances of not being fired. Bird appreciates this offer, but decides to come clean to his superiors regarding the incident. After the meeting with his supervisor, he is let go of his job. Bird realizes that now he has no prospects for ever travelling to Africa, and worries about his hospital bills and financial situation.

Bird tries to escape his responsibility for the child and his crumbling relationship with his wife, turning to alcohol and Himiko. He half attempts to kill the child, albeit indirectly, and is forced to decide whether he wants to keep the child.

== Translation ==
A Personal Matter was translated into English by John Nathan and published by Grove Press in 1968.
