= Hikari Ōe =

Japanese composer

- Born: June 13, 1963 (age 63); Tokyo, Japan
- Other name: 大江 光
- Occupation: Composer
- Father: Kenzaburō Ōe
- Relatives: Mansaku Itami (grandfather); Juzo Itami (uncle)

Hikari Ōe (大江 光, Ōe Hikari; born June 13, 1963) is a Japanese composer. He is the son of Japanese author and Nobel Prize laureate Kenzaburō Ōe and Yukari Ikeuchi, and the nephew of director Juzo Itami.

== Biography ==
Hikari Ōe was born autistic and developmentally disabled. Doctors tried to convince his parents to let their son die, but they refused to do so. Even after an operation, Ōe remained visually impaired, developmentally delayed, epileptic and with limited physical coordination. He does not speak much.

Ōe's parents report that his first response to a particular sound was when he was watching TV with his parents, and there was the sound of a bird singing, which he responded to. His parents were fascinated. They bought him a record with tracks of bird calls, in which a woman would say the name of each bird before the song of the bird would play. He listened to this record. Walking with his parents near their vacation home one day, they heard a bird singing, and he then imitated the voice of the woman who presented the bird songs in his child's records. This was how they got the idea to recruit a music teacher for Ōe. His parents arranged a piano teacher, Kumiko Tamura, for him. Instead of speaking, Ōe began to express his feelings in music and through musical composition. Eventually he was taught musical notation.

As an adult, Hikari creates chamber music. Hikari's first CD sold more than one million copies in the first few years of release.

== Hikari reflected in the works of the Nobel laureate ==
Kenzaburō Ōe credited his son for influencing his literary career. Kenzaburō tried to give his son a "voice" through his writing. Several of Kenzaburō's books feature a character based on his son.

In 1994, Kenzaburō won the Nobel Prize in Literature, in part because of his 1964 book, A Personal Matter, in which the writer describes his pain in accepting the brain-damaged child into his life, and of how he arrived at his resolve to live with his son. Hikari figures prominently in many of the books singled out for praise by the Nobel committee:

- A Personal Matter is the first of a series of works which describe aspects of Hikari's life.
- Teach Us to Outgrow Our Madness in 1969 provides insight into the life of a family with an unspeaking infant child.
- My Deluged Soul in 1973 describes a father's difficulties in relating to an infant child who, through the medium of the songs of the wild birds, slowly started to communicate with his family.
- Rouse Up O Young Men of the New Age! in 1983 describes Hikari's development from a child to a young man.

Hikari's life is the core of the first book published after Kenzaburō was awarded the Nobel Prize. This 1996 book, A Healing Family, celebrates the small victories in Hikari's life.

== Selected works ==
Ōe's published works have no linguistic content. His music and music scores encompass 12 works in 30 publications in 5 languages and 1,721 library holdings.

- Music of Hikari Ōe (1994), music
- Music of Hikari Ōe, Vol. 2 (1994), music
- Atarashii Ōe Hikari (2000), musical score
- Mou Ichido Ōe Hikari (2005), music
