= Die ersten Menschen =

German-language opera

- Opera by Rudi Stephan
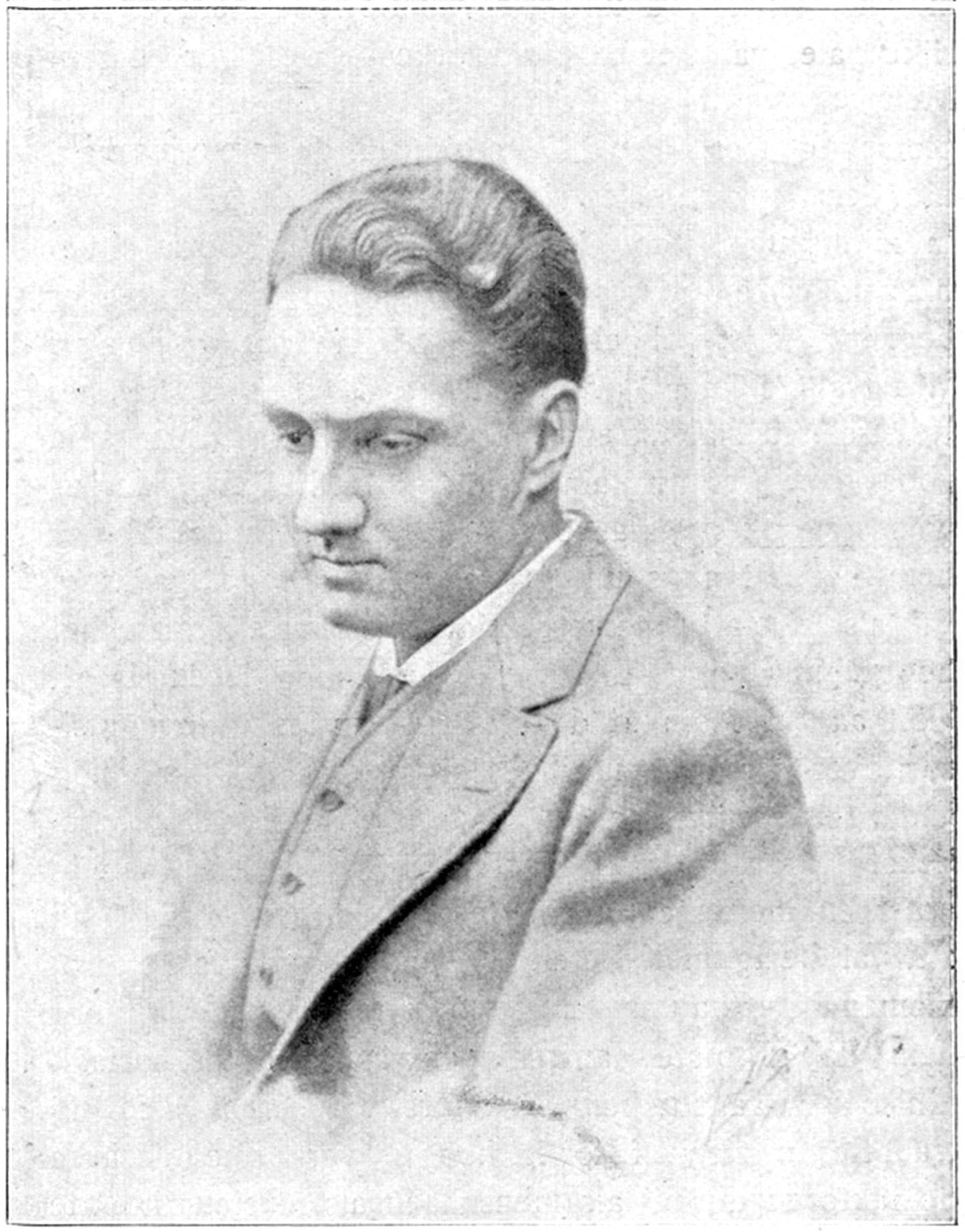
- Rudi Stephan
- Librettist: Otto Borngräber
- Language: German
- Premiere: 1 July 1920; Oper Frankfurt

Die ersten Menschen (The first humans) is an opera in two acts by Rudi Stephan. For the libretto the composer chose a drama of the same name by Otto Borngräber. The opera was premiered at the Oper Frankfurt on 1 July 1920.

== History ==
The poet Otto Borngräber wrote Die ersten Menschen, subtitled "Erotisches Mysterium" (Erotic mystery) in 1908. The play is based on the characters from the biblical Genesis creation narrative. When it was premiered in Munich in 1912, it caused a scandal and was banned in the Kingdom of Bavaria.

Rudi Stephan set the text to music as an opera in two acts. He began in 1909 and completed it in 1914, shortly before World War I. The premiere was planned at the Oper Frankfurt for the winter 1915; however, by then the composer had died at the Eastern Front.

The opera was finally premiered on 1 July 1920, conducted by Ludwig Rottenberg. The critics received the performance positively, but the audience less so, leading to few performances.

Karl Holl (1892–1972) made a shortened version, cutting objectionable passages. It was played at the Theater Münster on 17 November 1924. The opera was neglected from the 1950s, and revived in the late 1980s. The original score was played almost unchanged in a concert performance at the Konzerthaus Berlin, by the Rundfunk-Sinfonieorchester Berlin conducted by Karl Anton Rickenbacher. It was recorded with soloists Siegmund Nimsgern as Adahm, Gabriele Maria Ronge as Chawa, Florian Cerny as Kajin, and Hans Aschenbach as Chabel.

Another performance of the original version was performed on 24 November 2009 at the Freiburg Konzerthaus, with Fabrice Bollon conducting the Philharmonisches Orchester Freiburg. On 3 June 2021, François-Xavier Roth conducted the Royal Concertgebouw Orchestra in a stage production of Stopera in Amsterdam, directed by Calixto Bieito. On 2 July 2023, a new stage production of the opera with Sebastian Weigle conducting the Frankfurter Opern- und Museumsorchester premiered at Oper Frankfurt.

== Plot ==
The opera takes place after the expulsion from paradise according to the Genesis creation narrative. The scene is a landscape in spring.

The libretto can be described as psychological poetry. The opera deals with the matrimonial conflict between Adahm (Adam) and Chawa (Eve) and the sexual intrigues between the sons Kajin (Cain) and Chabel (Abel), who both desire the only woman available, their mother.

== Roles ==
Roles, voice types, premiere cast
Role	Voice type	Premiere cast, 1 July 1920 Conductor: Ludwig Rottenberg
Chawa	soprano	Beatrice Lauer-Kottlar
Adahm	bass	Walter Schneider
Kajin	baritone	Richard Breitenfeld
Chabel	tenor	Otto Fanger

== Recordings ==
- Gabriele Maria Ronge, Siegmund Nimsgern, Florian Cerny, Hans Aschenbach, Berlin Radio Symphony Orchestra conducted by Karl Anton Rickenbacher, cpo 1998 OCLC 314635291
- Nancy Gustafson, Franz Hawlata, Wolfgang Millgramm, Donnie Ray Albert, Orchestre National de France conducted by Mikko Franck, Naïve OCLC 752069633 (abridged version by Karl Holl)
