= Dornröschen =

Opera written by Engelbert Humperdinck

- Märchenoper by Engelbert Humperdinck
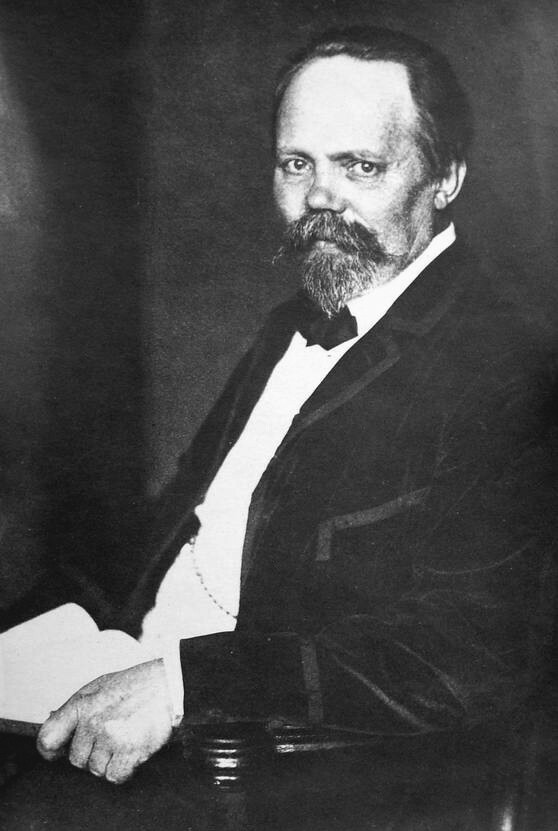
- The composer in 1910
- Translation: Sleeping Beauty
- Librettist: Elisabeth Ebeling; Bertha Lehrmann-Filhés
- Language: German
- Based on: Sleeping Beauty
- Premiere: 12 November 1902; Frankfurt Opera

Dornröschen (Sleeping Beauty) is a 1902 children's opera by Engelbert Humperdinck. The libretto, based on the story of Sleeping Beauty, was by fairy tale writer Elisabeth Ebeling and Bertha Lehrmann-Filhés, with a dialogue version by Ralf Eger who worked on Franz Lehár's operettas such as Der Zarewitsch.

== Premiere ==
Dornröschen premiered on 12 November 1902 at the Stadttheater in Frankfurt-am-Main, with Ludwig Rottenberg conducting.

Principal roles with premiere cast members:

Role	Premiere cast
Dornröschen	Hedwig Schacko
Dämonia	Pelagie Greef-Andriessen
Prince Reinhold	Heinrich Hensel
Kellermeister	Alfred Hauck
Tellermeister	Hermann Schramm
Patin	Beatrix Kernic

== Recordings ==
Complete opera

- Dornröschen – Brigitte Fassbaender (speaking role, Dämonia, the wicked fairy), Christina Landshamer (Rosa, Queen of the fairies), Kristiane Kaiser (Sleeping Beauty), Tobias Haaks (Reinhold), Stephanie Hampl (Morphina), Anna Borchers (Quecksilber), Miriam Clark (the Sun), Brigitte Bayer (a forget-me-not), Guibee Yang (a rose), Wolfgang Klose (Vogt of the Ancestral Castle), Jerzy May (Ringold), Barbara Malisch (Armgart). Chor des Bayerischen Rundfunks and Muenchner Rundfunkorchester; Ulf Schirmer, conductor. CPO, 2011.

Incidental music

- Märchenmusiken = Fairy-tale music - Hänsel und Gretel. Ouvertüre = Overture—Der blaue Vogel = The Blue Bird. Vorspiel : Der Weihnachtstraum = The Christmas Dream; Sternenreigen -- Königskinder = The King's Children. Konzertouvertüre = Concert Overture; Einleitung zum 2. Akt = Act II: Introduction : Hellafest und Kinderreigen; Einleitung zum 3. Akt. = Act II: Introduction : Verdorben-Gestorben! -- Dornröschen. Vorspiel = Prelude; Ballade; Irrfahrten = Wanderings; Dornenschloss = The Thorn Castle; Festklänge = Festival Sounds. Bamberger Symphoniker; Karl Anton Rickenbacher, conductor. Virgin Classics, 1992.
