= Der Schatzgräber =

Opera by Franz Schreker

- Opera by Franz Schreker
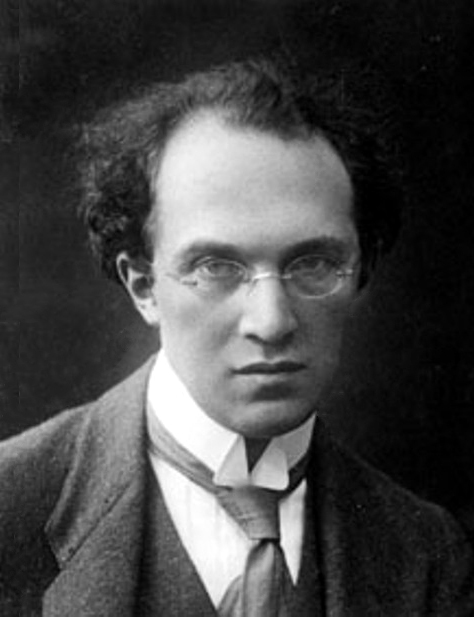
- The composer in 1912
- Translation: The Treasure Hunter
- Librettist: Schreker
- Language: German
- Premiere: 21 January 1920; Oper Frankfurt

Der Schatzgräber (The Treasure Hunter) is an opera in a prologue, four acts and an epilogue by Franz Schreker with a libretto by the composer.

== Composition history ==
Schreker wrote the libretto for the opera in the summer of 1915. He then broke off to attend to a revision of Das Spielwerk und die Prinzessin and compose the Chamber Symphony, returning to Der Schatzgräber in the summer of 1917. He dated the manuscript full score 12 November 1918. The score is published by Universal Edition Vienna.

== Performance history ==
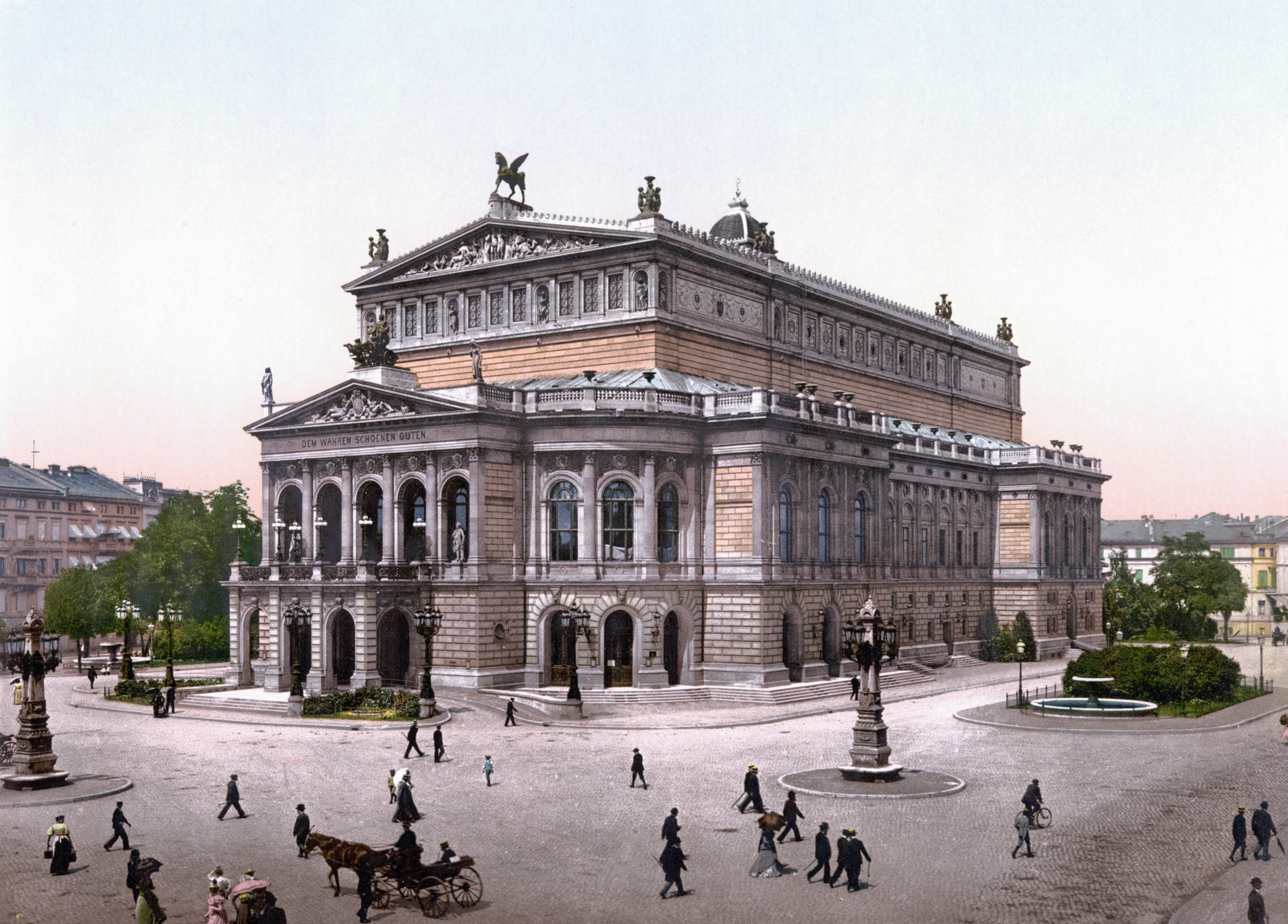
The opera house in Frankfurt 1880–1945

The opera was first performed on 21 January 1920 by the Oper Frankfurt, conducted by Ludwig Rottenberg. It was Schreker's most (but also his last) successful opera. It received 354 performances in over fifty cities between 1920 and 1924/1925, but after the change in the cultural and political climate in Germany, only a further 31 performances took place until 1932. The last production during the composer's lifetime was in Oldenburg in October 1931 whereafter, under the Nazis (who took power in 1933), Schreker's music was banned due to his Jewish ancestry.

The Berlin premiere took place on 3 April 1922 at the Berlin State Opera, conducted by Leo Blech, with Vera Schwarz, Robert Hutt and Waldemar Henke in the leading roles.

The Viennese premiere took place at the Vienna State Opera on 18 October 1922, conducted by Franz Schalk, with a cast including Nikolaus Zek, Fritz Krenn, Karl Norbert, Richard Schubert, Richard Tauber and Gertrud Kappel.

In 1922, Schreker prepared a Symphonic Interlude for concert performance, mainly drawn from the orchestral interlude from act 3. This was premiered by the Concertgebouw Orchestra conducted by Willem Mengelberg in October 1923.

The opera was revived in a concert performance conducted by Robert Heger in 1968, followed by another concert performance in Vienna under Lothar Zagrosek in 1985. Fully staged productions followed at the Theater St. Gallen (1988) and the Hamburg State Opera (1989).

The Netherlands Opera in Amsterdam staged a new production conducted by Marc Albrecht and directed by Ivo van Hove, in September 2012.

In May 2022, the Deutsche Oper Berlin staged a new production by Christof Loy, conducted by Marc Albrecht with Elisabet Strid and Daniel Johansson in the leading roles. This was recorded and released by Naxos in 2023. This production was also staged at the Opéra national du Rhin in Strasbourg in October 2022 conducted by Marko Letonja.

== Roles ==
Roles, voice types, premiere cast
| Role | Voice type | Premiere cast, 21 January 1920 Conductor: Ludwig Rottenberg |
|---|---|---|
| The king | high bass | Hans Erl |
| The queen | silent part | Marta Uersfeld |
| The chancellor | tenor | Hermann Schramm |
| The count | baritone | Rudolf Brinkmann |
| The schoolmaster | bass | |
| The fool (der Narr) | tenor | Erik Wirl |
| The bailiff (der Vogt) | baritone | Robert vom Scheidt |
| The young nobleman | baritone or high bass | |
| Elis, a minstrel | tenor | John Gläser |
| The mayor | bass | Carl Bauermann |
| The scribe | tenor | Otto Weindel |
| The innkeeper | bass | Josef Gareis |
| Els | soprano | Emma Hol |
| Albi | lyric tenor | Franz Wartenberg |
| A soldier | low bass | Arthur Simon |
| First citizen | tenor | Hermann Schramm |
| Second citizen | baritone | Robert vom Scheidt |
| Third citizen | bass | Arthur Simon |
| First old maid | mezzo-soprano | |
| Second old maid | mezzo-soprano (or contralto) | |
| A woman | contralto (or mezzo-soprano) | |

== Synopsis ==
The opera is set in legendary medieval times.

=== Prologue ===
The queen has lost her jewels, and with them her beauty and fertility. The king seeks the advice of his fool who knows about Elis, a wandering minstrel whose magic lute has the ability to hunt down hidden treasure. The king promises the fool that he will be allowed to have a wife of his choice as a reward, if Elis can find the jewels.

=== Act 1 ===
Els, daughter of the innkeeper, has to marry a brutal but rich young nobleman she despises. She therefore sends him away to find the queen's jewels, and has him murdered by Albi, her servant, who is in love with her. The minstrel Elis has meanwhile found his way to the inn and presents Els with an ornament he has found in the woods. Els falls in love with the young minstrel, but then the body of the dead nobleman is found in the woods; the bailiff, who wants Els for himself, arrests Elis on suspicion of murder.

=== Act 2 ===
Elis is to be hanged for his crime. Els asks the fool for help, who assures her that all will turn out well. The king's messenger stops the execution at the last moment, so Elis can go in search of the jewels. To avoid being exposed as the thief, Els orders Albi to steal the minstrel's magic lute.

=== Act 3 ===
During a night of love, Els presents herself to Elis in the full beauty of the jewels. She hands over the jewellery to him, on condition that he will never ask her about their provenance, and will always trust her.

=== Act 4 ===
Elis has returned the jewels to the queen. During a celebration, the bailiff intervenes and announces that Albi has confessed to the murder. Els is denounced as the instigator of the murder, and the bailiff demands her immediate execution. But the fool, reminding the king of his promise, chooses Els as his wife and thus saves her from being executed. They go off together.

=== Epilogue ===
It is one year later and Els is dying. Only the fool has remained with her. He fetches Elis, who sings his most beautiful ballad for Els about a fairy-tale palace where they will be welcomed as Prince and Princess. Consoled, she dies in the minstrel's arms. The Fool mourns her death.

== Instrumentation ==
The orchestral score requires:

- 3 flutes (flute 3 doubling piccolo), 2 oboes, English horn (doubling oboe 3), 2 clarinets in A/B♭, bass clarinet in B♭, 2 bassoons, contrabassoon;
- 4 horns in F, 3 trumpets in C, 3 trombones, bass tuba
- timpani, percussion (4 players), high bells, 2 harps, celesta
- strings (violins I, violins II, violas, violoncellos, double basses)

== Recordings ==
- In 1968, a studio performance (with many cuts) was broadcast on Austrian Radio (ORF), conducted by Robert Heger (who had also conducted the first performance of the work in Nuremberg in 1920). Elis was sung by Fritz Uhl, and Els by Doris Jung. Although the whole recording has not been released on CD, extracts were issued on the CD accompanying the book Franz Schreker: Grenzgänge, Grenzklänge (Hailey and Haas; Mandelbaum, 2004).
- In 1990 the German record label Capriccio released a live recording made in May/June 1989 at the Hamburg State Opera, with Gerd Albrecht conducting the Philharmonisches Staatsorchester Hamburg, with Josef Protschka in the title role and Gabriele Schnaut as Els. The score was heavily cut.
- In 2013, the Dutch label Challenge Classics released a live recording from performances at Netherlands Opera in September/October 2012 with Marc Albrecht conducting the Netherlands Philharmonic Orchestra featuring Manuela Uhl as Els and Raymond Very as Elis. The score was uncut, apart from a short sequence in act 2.
- 2022 live video recording from Deutsche Oper Berlin, Daniel Johansson (Elis), Elisabet Strid (Els), Michael Laurenz (Fool), Thomas Johannes Mayer (Bailiff), Tuomas Pursio (King), Deutsche Oper Berlin Chorus, Deutsche Oper Berlin, Christof Loy (stage director), Marc Albrecht (conductor). The opera is presented complete apart from a cut of 55 bars starting at bar 214 in Act 2, amounting to about three minutes of music. (Naxos DVD 2.110584-85 / Blu-ray NBD0083V)
