= Oberst Chabert =

Oberst Chabert is an opera (described by the composer as a "musical tragedy in three acts") by Hermann Wolfgang von Waltershausen, loosely adapted by the composer from the novel Colonel Chabert by Honoré de Balzac.

== Performance history ==
Waltershausen completed the score in 1911, and the opera was given its premiere at Frankfurt am Main on 18 January 1912. The premiere was a success, and the opera was performed two months later at the Kurfürstenoper in Berlin. In the years before World War I, the opera was staged internationally, including at Covent Garden Opera House in April 1913. After the war, Waltershausen's Wagnerian, late-Romantic musical style gradually lost ground to new musical developments, such as Neue Sachlichkeit and Zeitoper, and the opera disappeared from the repertoire (as was the case with stage works by other post-Wagnerian composers such as Wilhelm Kienzl, Siegfried Wagner, and Max von Schillings), but it was revived for its one hundredth staging on 4 March 1933 at the Berlin City Opera. After World War II, the opera was occasionally revived, but after Waltershausen's death in 1954, it fell into obscurity, along with the rest of Waltershausen's works. It was given a semi-staged performance at the Deutsche Oper Berlin in March 2010, with Jacques Lacombe conducting and Bo Skovhus singing the title role. It was given a fully staged performance at Theater Bonn in June 2018, with Lacombe again conducting.

== Roles ==
Role	Voice type	Premiere cast, 18 January 1912 (Conductor: Hans Schilling-Ziemssen)
Count Chabert	baritone	Richard Breitenfeld
Count Ferraud	tenor	Hermann Schramm
Countess Rosine	soprano	Else Gentner-Fischer
Derville	baritone	Rudolf Brinkmann
Godeschal	bass	Richárd Erdős
Bouchard	tenor	Robert Hutt

== Synopsis ==
Hyacinth Chabert, a colonel in Napoleon's army, is badly injured at the Battle of Eylau in 1807. He is buried in a mass grave and his name is included in a list of fallen soldiers. Still alive, Chabert struggles out of a mass grave and is restored to health by local peasants. He slowly and painfully makes his way back to Paris.

=== Act 1 ===
Ten years later, in 1817, Chabert arrives in the office of the lawyer Derville, determined to regain his property and his wife Rosine, who has remarried to Count Ferraud. Unbeknownst to Chabert, Derville also serves as Ferraud and Rosine's lawyer. Rosine enters Derville's office, and is confronted by Chabert, who she claims not to recognize. However, Godeschal, one of Derville's clerks, was a corporal under Chabert's command, and recognizes his former colonel. Derville hurries to find Count Ferraud.

=== Act 2 ===
In Count Ferraud's palace, Rosine tries to bribe Derville, but he refuses the money. When Ferraud enters from the garden, Derville tells him the news of Chabert, and he is greatly distressed. Derville brings Chabert from the coach, followed by Godeschal, who refuses to leave behind his former colonel. Rosine confesses to recognizing Chabert, and the act ends with a vocal quintet.

=== Act 3 ===
Left alone with her former husband, Rosine tells Chabert that she never loved him and leaves. Overwhelmed, Chabert decides that "the dead should not come back to life", writes a suicide note, and departs for the garden. Rosine enters with Derville and Ferraud, who have finalized divorce papers. Seeing that Ferraud only cares for his honorable name, Rosine realizes that she really did love Chabert. A gunshot is heard in the garden, and Chabert's corpse is brought in. Rosine embraces him, drinks poison, and dies by his side. Ferraud laments that she did not even bother to look at him.
