= Arthur St John Adcock =

English novelist and poet (1864–1930)

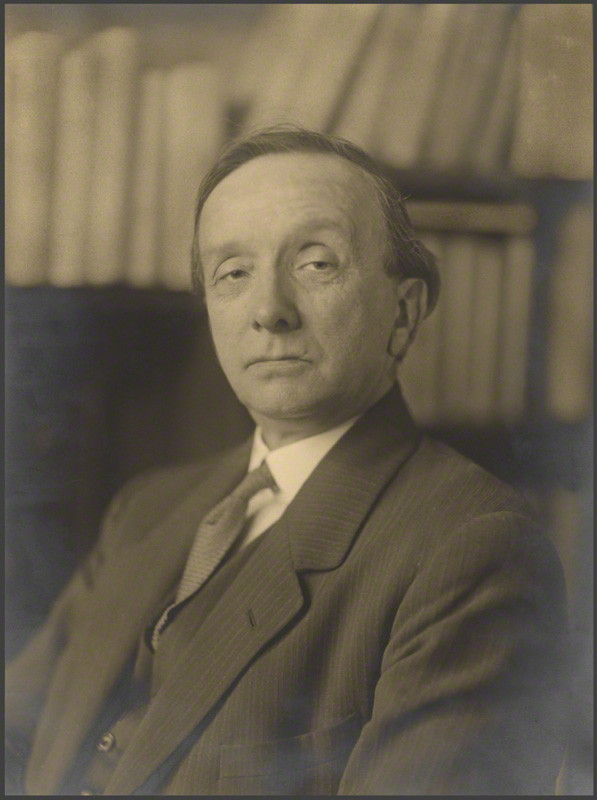
St. John Adcock (1920s photograph by Walter Benington)

Arthur St John Adcock (17 January 1864 in London – 9 June 1930 in Richmond) was an English novelist and poet, known as A. St John Adcock or St John Adcock. He is remembered for his discovery of the then-unknown poet W. H. Davies. His daughters, Marion St John Webb and Almey St John Adcock, were also writers.

== Biography ==
Arthur St John Adcock was born on 17 January 1864 in London. He was a Fleet Street journalist for half a century, as an assiduous freelance writer. He worked initially as a law office clerk, becoming a full-time writer in 1893. Adcock built up a literary career by unrelenting efforts in circulating his manuscripts, initially also working part-time as an assistant editor on a trade journal.

He was a founder member in 1901 of Paul Henry's literary and performing club, with Robert Lynd, Frank Rutter and others. The acting editor of The Bookman from 1908, Adcock, according to A. E. Waite who knew him, did all the work of the Bookman, nominally under its founder William Robertson Nicoll. In 1923, he became its official editor.

As an influential critic, Adcock has been classed with conservatives such as Hilaire Belloc, Edmund Gosse, Henry Newbolt, E. B. Osborn and Arthur Waugh.

Adcock was a friend of the weird fiction writer William Hope Hodgson and wrote an introduction to Hodgson's posthumously published book, The Calling of the Sea.

Adcock married Marion Taylor in 1887, and they settled in Hampstead. Their daughters Marion St John Webb (1888–1930) and Almey St John Adcock (1894–1986), became writers.

He died on 9 June 1930 in Richmond. Adcock's papers are held by the Bodleian Library.

== Works ==
Adcock is considered one of the "Cockney school novelists" (not the earlier Cockney School poets), a group influenced by Charles Dickens and including also Henry Nevinson, Edwin Pugh, and William Pett Ridge. East End Idylls (1897), about the London slums, began an early trilogy, and had an introduction by the Christian Socialist James Granville Adderley, a friend. It drew on Arthur Morrison.

Adcock published:

- An unfinished martyrdom and other stories (1894)
- Beyond Atonement (1896)
- East End Idylls (1897)
- The Consecration of Hetty Fleet (1898)
- In The Image of God (1898)
- In The Wake of the War (1900)
- Songs of the War (1900)
- The Luck of Private Foster: A Romance of Love and War (1900)
- From a London Garden (1903)
- More Than Money (1903)
- In Fear of Man (1904)
- London Etchings (1904)
- Admissions And Asides (1905)
- Love in London (1906)
- London From The Top of A 'Bus (1906)
- The Shadow Show (1907)
- The World that Never Was. A London Fantasy (1908) (Digital version)
- Billicks (1909)
- Two to Nowhere (1911)
- A Man with a Past (1911)
- Famous Houses and Literary Shrines of London (1912)
- The Booklover's London (1913)
- Modern Grub Street and other essays (1913)
- In the Firing Line (1914) as editor, a war reportage anthology, part of the Daily Telegraph War Books series
- Seeing it through. How Britain answered the call (1915)
- Australasia Triumphant! With the Australians and New Zealanders in the Great War on Land And Sea (1916)
- Songs of The World War (1916)
- For Remembrance. Soldier Poets who have Fallen in the War. With nineteen portraits (1918)
- The ANZAC Pilgrim's Progress: Ballads of Australia's Army (1918) Lance-Corporal Cobber, editor
- Tod MacMammon Sees His Soul (1920)
- Exit Homo (1921)
- The Divine Tragedy (1922)
- Gods of Modern Grub Street: Impressions of Contemporary Authors (1923) on Jeffery Farnol, W. B. Maxwell, W. W. Jacobs et al.
- With the gilt off (1923)
- Robert Louis Stevenson: His Work and His Personality (1924) editor
- The Bookman Treasury of Living Poets [1925) editor, and later editions
- A Book of Bohemians (1925)
- The Prince of Wales' African Book (1926)
- City Songs (1926) editor, poetry anthology
- Wonderful London (1926/7) editor, three volumes; a shorter version (1935) was reissued in one volume, with preface by Almey St John Adcock, his daughter.
- The Glory that was Grub Street – Impressions of Contemporary Authors (1928)
- Collected Poems of St. John Adcock (Hodder and Stoughton, 1929)
- London Memories (1931)
- Hyde Park

Adcock was the last editor of The Odd Volume (1917), an annual that folded during World War I.
