= Rudolf Brinkmann =

Rudolf Brinkmann may refer to:

- Rudolf Brinkmann (economist) (1893–1955), German economist and banker
- Rudolf Brinkmann (baritone) (1873–1927), German operatic baritone
