= Vincent Brome =

English writer

- Born: 14 July 1910; London, England
- Died: 16 October 2004 (aged 94); London, England
- Occupation: English writer

Vincent Brome /bruːm/ (14 July 1910 – 16 October 2004) was an English writer, who gradually established himself as a man of letters. He is best known for a series of biographies of politicians, writers and followers of Sigmund Freud. He also wrote numerous novels, and was a dramatist.

He was born and brought up in London, and educated at Streatham Grammar School and Elleston School. He failed to enter university, and was found a job at a tea broker. He left home at 18 determined to write for a living. He took up residence in Bloomsbury, where he would live for the rest of his life.

== Early career ==
Brome began his career as a journalist and magazine editor. His first short story anthology was published in 1936. Having been declared unfit for active duty, he worked for the British Ministry of Information during World War II. After the war Brome worked under Michael Young as a Labour Party researcher.

== Literary career ==
Following the electoral success of the Labour Party in 1945, Brome turned his hand to biography writing. Fittingly, his first subject was the new prime minister: Clement Attlee. He received critical and commercial success with his second work, a biography of H. G. Wells, in 1950. Brome went on to chronicle the lives of Sigmund Freud, Carl Jung, Frank Harris, J. B. Priestley, and Havelock Ellis. Two of his literary works, The Surgeon and The Embassy, were international bestsellers. However, his works were not always treated so kindly by critics; his biography of Aneurin Bevan was particularly poorly received.

Brome was a regular at the British Library, and was a member of its advisory committee from 1975 until 1982. He was a vocal supporter of the library's move from the British Museum to its own purpose-built building in St. Pancras, even writing numerous letters to such organs as The Times and the Times Literary Supplement praising the move.

At the time of his death, aged 94, Brome still occupied the third story flat he had lived in for fifty years despite growing frailty and deafness. Eighteen boxes of his personal papers are held at the Harry Ransom Center at the University of Texas at Austin.

== Works ==
- My Favourite Quotation (1936)
- Clement Attlee (1947) biography
- H.G. Wells (1951) biography
- Aneurin Bevan (1953) biography
- The Last Surrender (1954)
- The Way Back; the story of Lieut.-Commander Pat O'Leary, G.C., D.S.O., R.N. (1957) World War II biography
- Six Studies in Quarrelling (1958)
- Frank Harris (1959) biography
- Sometimes at Night (1959)
- We Have Come a Long Way (1962)
- The Problem of Progress (1963)
- Love in Our Time (1964)
- Four Realist Novelists: Arthur Morrison, Edwin Pugh, Richard Whiteing, William Pett Ridge (1965)
- The International Brigades: Spain 1936–1939 (1965) history
- Freud and His Early Circle (1967) biography
- The World of Luke Simpson (1967)
- The Surgeon (1967) novel, "The operating theater" in the U.S.
- The Revolution (1969)
- Confessions of a Writer (1970) autobiography
- Reverse your Verdict: A Collection of Private Prosecutions (1971)
- The Brain Operators (1971)
- The Ambassador and the Spy (1973) novel
- The Day of Destruction (1974)
- The Happy Hostage (1976)
- Jung: Man and Myth (1978) biography
- Havelock Ellis, Philosopher of Sex: A Biography (1979)
- Ernest Jones: Freud's Alter Ego (1982) biography
- The Day of the Fifth Moon (1984) historical novel
- J. B. Priestley (1988) biography
- The Other Pepys (1992) biography
- Love in the Plague (2001)
- Retribution (2001)
