= Hermann Wolfgang von Waltershausen =

German composer, conductor, teacher and writer

Herman von Waltershausen

Hermann Wolfgang Sartorius Freiherr von Waltershausen (Göttingen, 12 October 1882 – Munich, 14 June 1954) was a German composer, conductor, teacher and writer.

== Life and career ==
He was the son of the economist August Sartorius von Waltershausen (1852–1938) and his wife Charlotte Freiin von Kapherr, a descendant of the historian Georg Friedrich Sartorius. He studied composition with Ludwig Thuille in Munich from 1901 until 1907. He also studied piano with August Schmid-Lindner from 1905 to 1915.

At the age of nine, Waltershausen was diagnosed with Hodgkin's lymphoma. To prevent its spread, doctors amputated his right arm and leg. This did not prevent Waltershausen from pursuing music, however – he specialised in left-handed piano performance with Schmid-Lindner and conducted with his left hand.

Waltershausen's greatest professional success was the opera Oberst Chabert, which he adapted from the novel by Honoré de Balzac. The pacing, characterisation, and pathos of Waltershausen's libretto was widely admired by his contemporaries, often more so than the music itself. Composer and critic Edgar Istel commented, "Though Waltershausen has not as yet shown himself to be a musician of great importance, one must watch his development as a dramatist with interest." Waltershausen also wrote the libretto to Hermann Zilcher's comic opera Doktor Eisenbart.

== Surviving works, editions and recordings ==
Many of Waltershausen's compositions were destroyed in World War II; the following list represents the works which are still extant either in published form or as manuscripts in Waltershausen's papers in the Stadtbibliothek München.

=== Operas ===
- Else Klapperzehen, Musikalische Komödie in 2 acts (1907, Dresden 1909)
- Oberst Chabert, Op. 10 Musical tragedy in 3 acts after the novel by Honoré de Balzac. (1910, Frankfurt 1912). Recording: Bo Skovhus, Raymond Very, Manuela Uhl, Simon Pauly, Orchester der Deutschen Oper Berlin, Jacques Lacombe CPO 2010
- Richardis, Romantische Oper in 3 acts (1914, Karlsruhe 1915)
- Die Rauhensteiner Hochzeit, Opera in 3 acts (1918, Karlsruhe 1919)
- Die Gräfin von Tolosa, Opera in 2 Parts (composed 1932–36, radio concert Bayerischer Rundfunk München 1958)

=== Orchestral and chamber works ===
- String quartet, Op. 16 (1915)
- Apokalyptische Symphonie, Op. 19 (1924)
- Hero und Leander, Symphonie Op. 20 (1925)
- Krippenmusik, Op. 23 (1926), for harpsichord and chamber orchestra
- Orchesterpartita, Op. 24 (1928)
- Lustspiel-Ouvertüre, Op. 26 (1930)
- Passions- und Auferstehungsmusik, Op. 27 (1932), for two oboes, two horns, and string quintet

=== Vocal works ===
- Acht Gesänge, Op. 11 (1913)
- Zwei Lieder, aus dem Nachlaß (1913)
- Ricarda Huch-Lieder, Op. 12 (1913)
- Drei weltgeistliche Lieder, Op. 13 (1913)
- Cophtisches Lied, Op. 15 (1914)
- Alkestis, Melodram Op. 25 (1929), for speaker, choir, and large orchestra
- Die Wunder der Julnächte (1934), for children's choir

=== Piano music ===
- Polyphone Studien, Op. 21 (1921)
- Chopin-Bearbeitungen (1943), arrangements of Chopin for left hand alone
- Fuge in C-moll (1953)
- Fuge in B-dur (über B-A-C-H) (1954)
