= The March of the 45 =

The March of the 45 was a poetic radio play about the Jacobite Rising of 1745. It was created by D. G. Bridson and broadcast by the BBC in 1936. It was the first production in the verse play format especially produced for the radio, being followed by The Fall of the City which was broadcast by CBS in 1937. It was influential and well-received, being described by Clement Semmler in 1981 as "still the best radio verse play written in English".
