= Arnold von Lasaulx =

German mineralogist and petrographer (1839–1886)

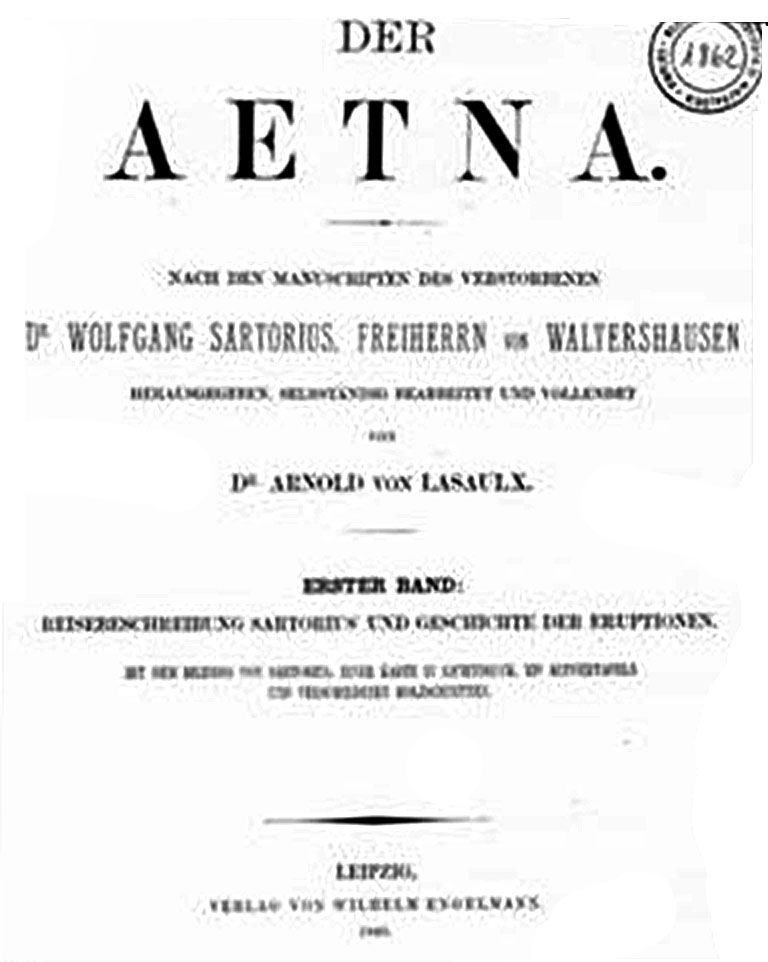

Arnold Constantin Peter Franz von Lasaulx (14 June 1839 – 25 January 1886) was a German mineralogist and petrographer.

== Life ==
He was born at Kastellaun near Coblenz, and educated at the University of Berlin, where he took his Ph.D. in 1868. In 1875, he became an associate professor of mineralogy at Breslau, and in 1880, a professor of mineralogy and geology at Bonn. He was distinguished for his researches on minerals and on crystallography, and he was one of the earlier workers on microscopic petrography. In 1876, he studied a mineral from the mineral collection of the Breslau Museum, classified as vivianite from Spain, discovering that it was a silicate and did not contain phosphorus. He considered it a new mineral species, for which he proposed the name aerinite. He described in 1878 the eruptive rocks of the district of Saar and Moselle.

In 1880 he edited "Der Aetna" from the manuscripts of Wolfgang Sartorius von Waltershausen, the results of observation made between the years 1834 and 1869. He was author of "Elemente der Petrographie" (1875), "Einführung in die Gesteinslehre" (1885), and "Précis de petrographie" (1887). He died at Bonn in January 1886.

== Works ==
- Petrographische Studien an den vulkanischen Gesteinen der Auvergne (Stuttgart 1868–71); Petrographic studies on the volcanic rocks of the Auvergne.
- Das Erdbeben von Herzogenrath vom 22. Okt. 1873 (Bonn 1874); The earthquake of Herzogenrath on 22 October 1873.
- Das Erdbeben von Herzogenrath vom 24. Juni 1877 (Bonn 1878); The earthquake of Herzogenrath on 24 June 1877.
- Elemente der Petrographie (Bonn 1875); Elements of petrography.
- Über vulkanische Kraft (n. d. Engl. of Robert Mallet, das. 1875);
- Aus Irland, Reiseskizzen und Studien (Bonn 1877);
- Sizilien. Ein geographisches Charakterbild (Bonn 1879);
- Der Ätna, according to Wolfgang Sartorius von Waltershausen's manuscripts, edited and completed, (Leipzig 1880);
- Die Bausteine des Kölner Doms (Bonn 1882);
- Einführung in die Gesteinslehre (Berl. 1886);
- Irland und Sizilien (Berlin 1883)
- Wie das Siebengebirge entstand (1884).
