= Otto Borngräber =

German writer and playwright

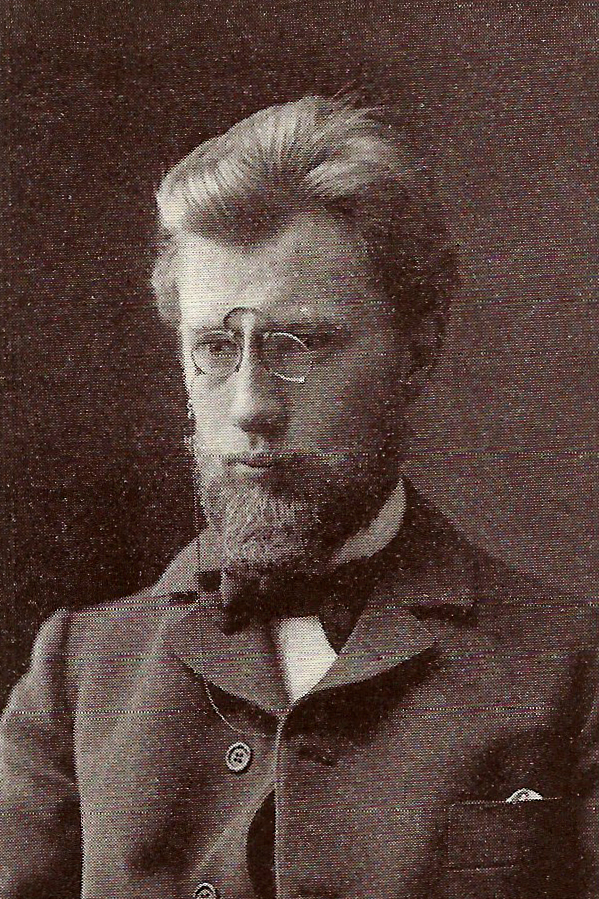
- Borngräber, 1902
- Born: 18 November 1874; Stendal
- Died: 19 October 1916 (aged 41); Lugano, Italy
- Education: University of Tübingen; University of Halle; University of Marburg
- Occupations: Writer; Playwright
- Organizations: Neues Theater Berlin; Monte Verità

Otto Borngräber (19 November 1874 – 19 October 1916) was a German writer and playwright.

== Life ==
Borngräber was born in Stendal, Altmark, on 19 November 1874 to Wilhelm and Flora Borngräber. His father was a primary school teacher. After completing school in Stendal with the Abitur, he began studies of theology and philosophy at the University of Tübingen in 1896. He moved to the University of Halle in 1898, and on to the University of Marburg after a short time, returning to Halle in 1900. In 1908, he was promoted to the doctorate with a dissertation about the awakening of philosophical speculation during the Reformation ("Das Erwachen der philosophischen Spekulation der Reformationszeit").

He then worked for a short time as dramaturge for Neues Theater Berlin. He married the writer Gertrud von Schlieben, known under her pen name Gerda von Robertus, on 10 July 1911. They were divorced two years later. His drama Die ersten Menschen (The first humans), completed in 1908 and subtitled Erotisches Mysterium (erotic mystery play), was banned in Bavaria in 1912 after its premiere in Munich. He joined the group of the Monte Verità, and became friends with the dancer Rudolf von Laban. A dance drama in three parts with text by Borngräber was performed in 1917, titled Sang an die Sonne (Song to the sun), with masks and costumes created by Marcel Janco. Bornräber joined a call to a convention "Vegetarisch-sozialer Kongress") (Vegetarian-social congress), that was held in April 1916, intended as a demonstration for peace and against capitalism, and led by the pacifist Paul Birukoff, a friend of Tolstoi.

Borngräber was a member of the Deutscher Monistenbund. When nationalist tendencies showed in the association in 1915, he reacted writing a Friedensappell an die Völker (Appeal for peace to the nations) and the Weltfriedensdrama, a drama for world peace.

Borngräber died in Lugano on 19 October 1916 at age 41.

== Legacy ==
Borngräbers Drama Die ersten Menschen was set as an opera, Die ersten Menschen, by Rudi Stephan, completed in 1915, premiered in 1920 by the Oper Frankfurt, and revived beginning in the 1980s.

== Work ==
=== Stage ===
- Das neue Jahrhundert. (Giordano Bruno) Eine Tragödie. Mit einem Vorwort von Ernst Haeckel. Strauß, Bonn 1900. (Digitalisat der 2. Aufl. 1901)
- König Friedwahn. Germanisches Trauerspiel in fünf Aufzügen. Schwetschke, Berlin 1905. OCLC 72025410
- Die heiligen zehn Gebote des Freien. Der heilige Glaube des Freien. Das heilige Gebet des Freien. Moses oder die Geburt Gottes. tragedy, Verlag Neues Leben, Ron /Berlin 1907. OCLC 43322783
- Die ersten Menschen. Erotisches Mysterium in zwei Akten. Marquardt, Berlin 1908. OCLC 163463781
- Althäa und ihr Kind. Die Tragödie der Reinheit. Ein Vorspiel und vier Akte in einem Aufzuge. Borngräber, Berlin 1912. OCLC 915750901
- Die andere Nacht. Mysterium der Liebe. Borngräber, Berlin 1910. OCLC 72025423
- Weltfriedensdrama. Ein Weihespiel. Borngräber, Berlin 1916. OCLC 4269651

=== Philosophy ===
- Gottfreies Christentum. 1903 (lost)
- Das Erwachen der philosophischen Spekulation der Reformationszeit in ihrem stufenweisen Fortschreiten beleuchtet an Schwenkfeld, Thamer, Sebastian Franck von Wörd. (dissertation) Gärtner, Schwarzenberg 1908. OCLC 1014540402
- Gottfreies Menschentum. Die Fortsetzung der alten, die Vollendung einer neuen Reformation. Neues Leben, Berlin 1909. OCLC 778268836
- with Georg Brandes: Friedens-Appell an die Völker. Stockholm 1916. OCLC 235955203

=== Poetry ===
- In Wald und Welle und Heide. Ebering, Berlin 1900.
- Neue Gedichte. 1903 (lost).
- Die Hymnen an die Größe und das tiefe Leid. 1915 (lost).

== Sources ==
- Rudolf Steiner: "Das Neue Jahrhundert". Eine Tragödie von Otto Borngräber. In: Magazin für Literatur 1900, 69th year, Nos. 24, 28, 29 (GA 29, pp. 385–392).
