= D. G. Bridson =

Radio producer and author

Douglas Geoffrey Bridson
- Born: 21 August 1910; Heaton Norris, Stockport, Cheshire, England
- Died: 19 October 1980 (aged 70); Camden, London, England
- Occupations: Radio producer and author

Douglas Geoffrey Bridson (21 August 1910 – 19 October 1980), commonly known as D. G. Bridson, was a radio producer and author who became the "cultural boss of the BBC".

== Biography ==
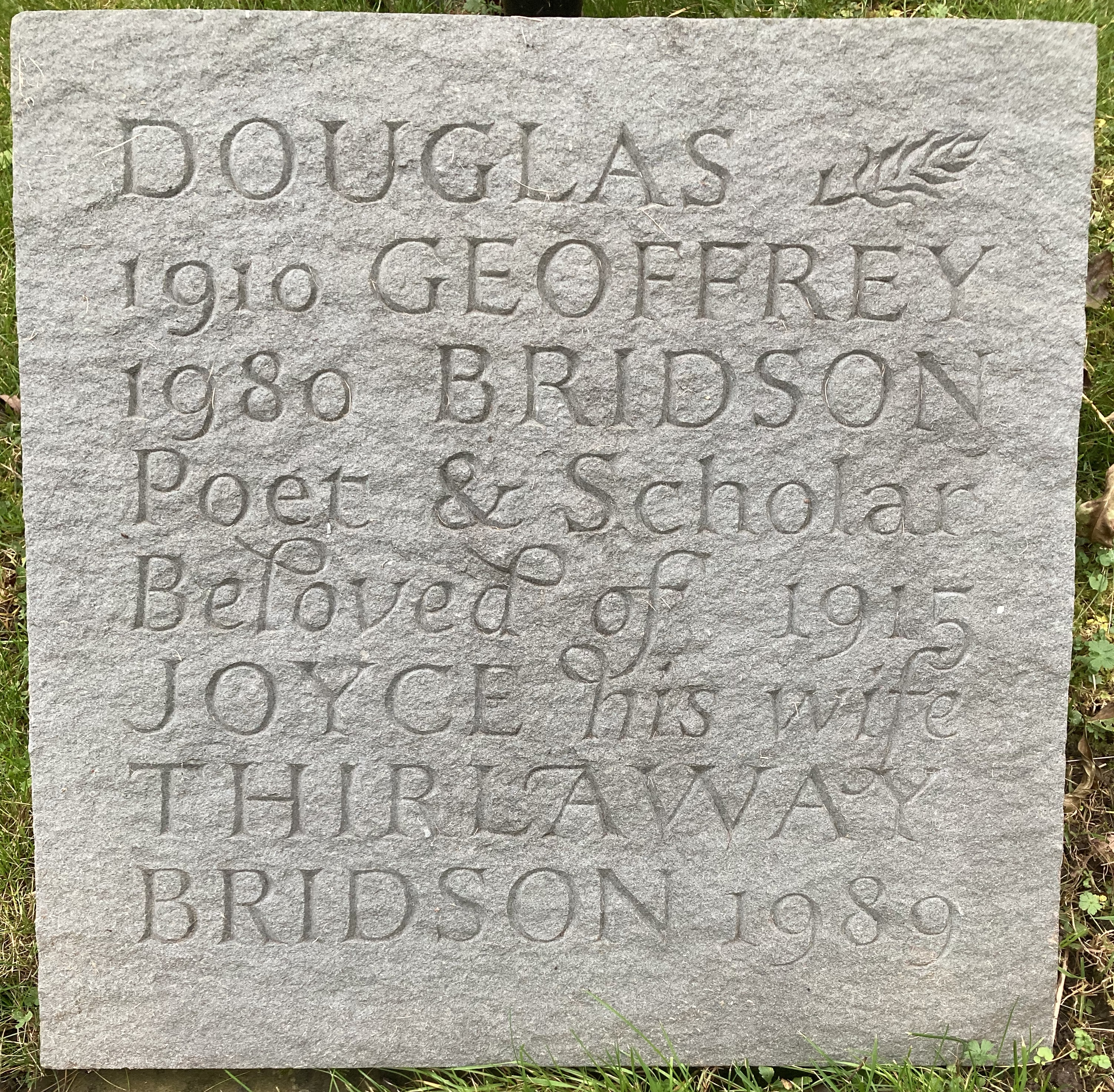
Grave (ashes) of Douglas Geoffrey Bridson in Highgate Cemetery (west side)

Douglas Bridson (he was known to all as Geoffrey) started as a freelance writer then joined BBC radio as a Feature Programmes Assistant for their North Region in 1935.

He became the influential BBC Programme Editor for Arts, Sciences, and Documentaries (Sound) from 1964 to 1967 and retired in 1969, having written or produced more than 800 programmes during his career. Many of his radio plays featured music by Norman Fulton.

In his poems he made frequent reference to the Isle of Man where he had family.

Of interest to all theatre people is the close relationship he had with Joan Littlewood.

He died on 19 October 1980 and his ashes are buried on the western side of Highgate Cemetery to the right of the war memorial in the courtyard.

== Works ==
- The March of the 45 (1936)
- The Bomb (1954), a documentary on the consequences of a nuclear war.
- My People and Your People (1959), a "West Indian Ballad Opera" written with additional material from Jamaican writer Andrew Salkey
- The Negro in America (1964)
- America since the Bomb (1966)
