= Wolfgang Sartorius von Waltershausen =

German geologist (1809–1876)

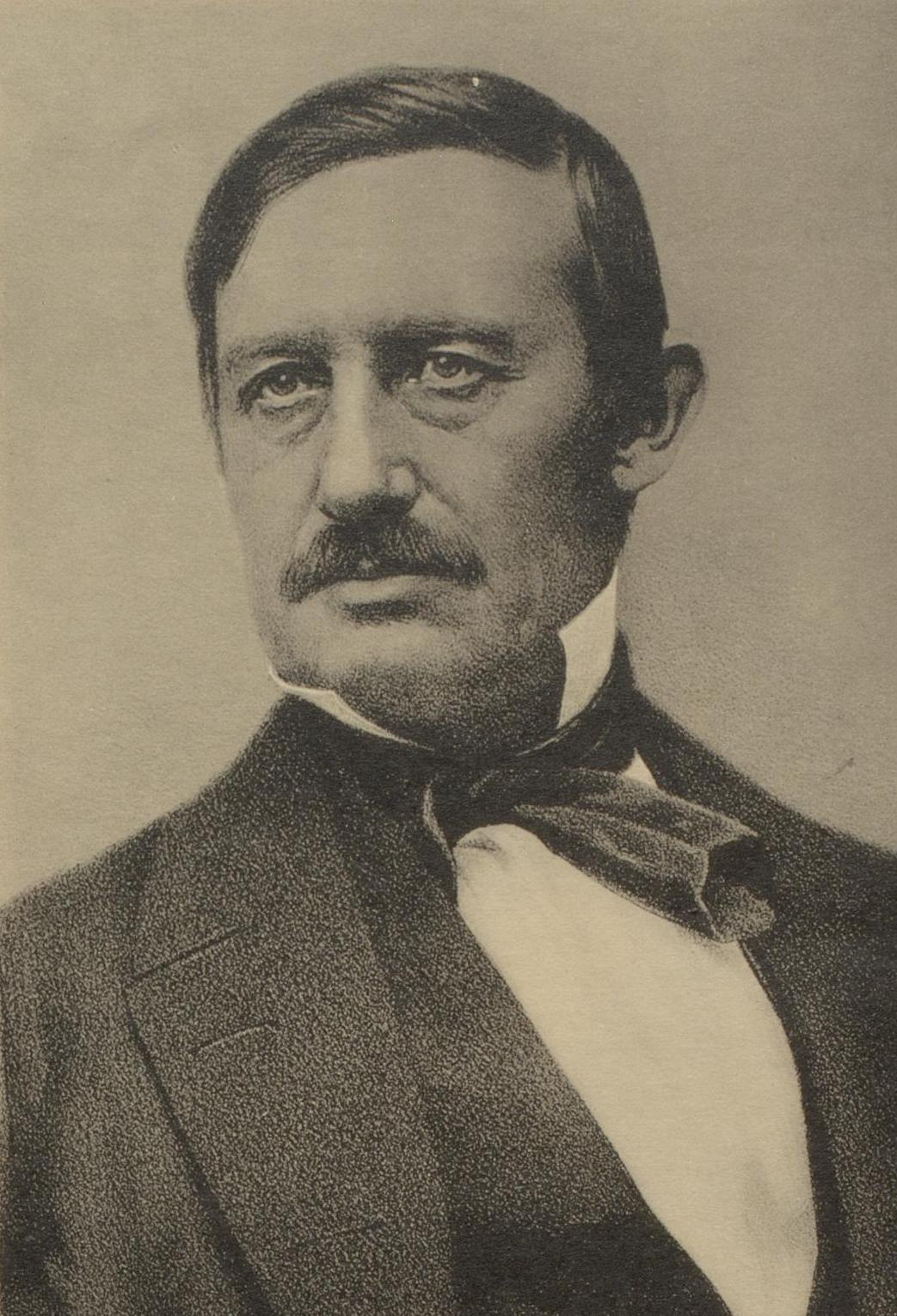
Wolfgang Sartorius von Waltershausen

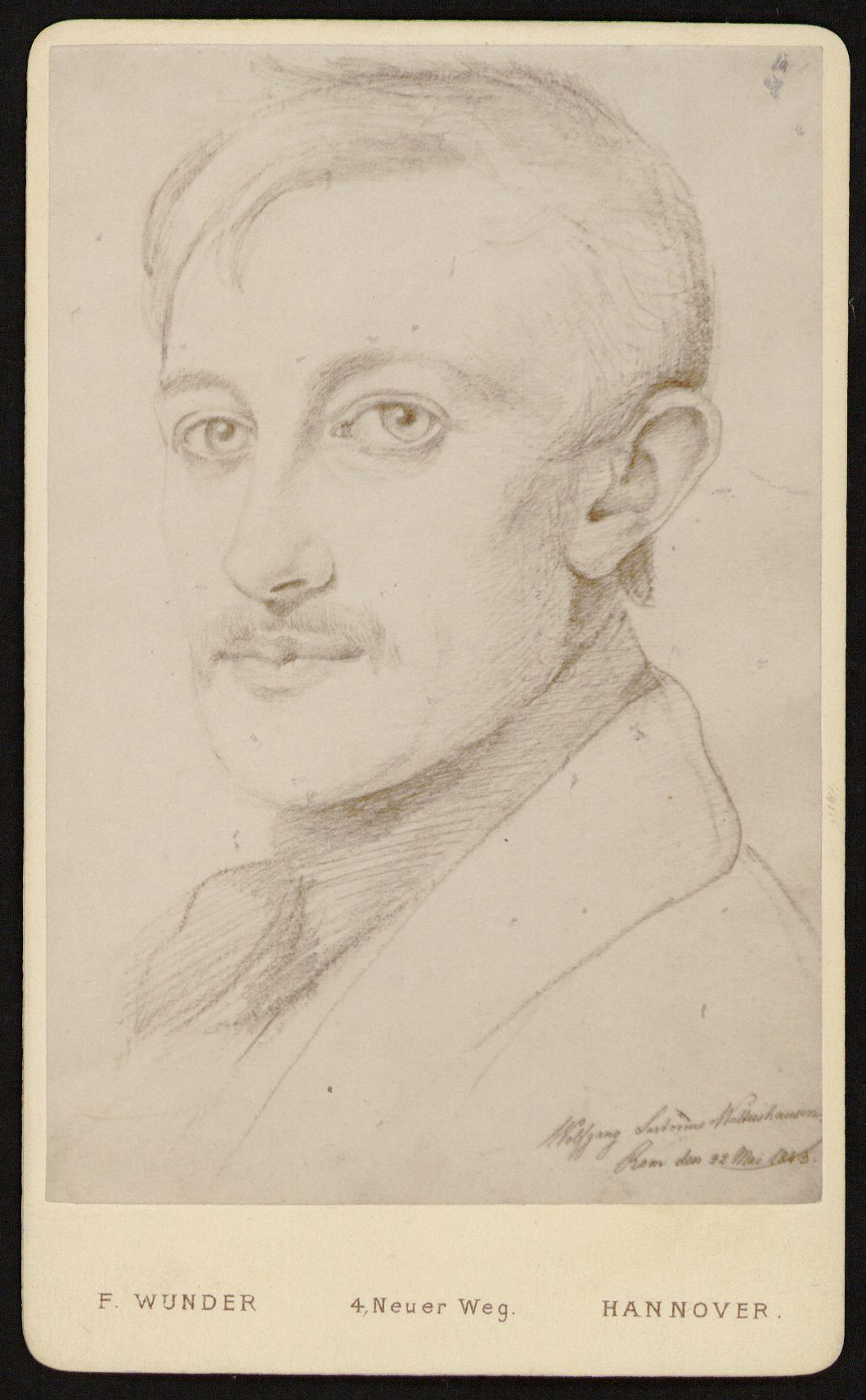
Wolfgang Sartorius von Waltershausen drawn in May 22nd 1843 in Rome by August Kestner

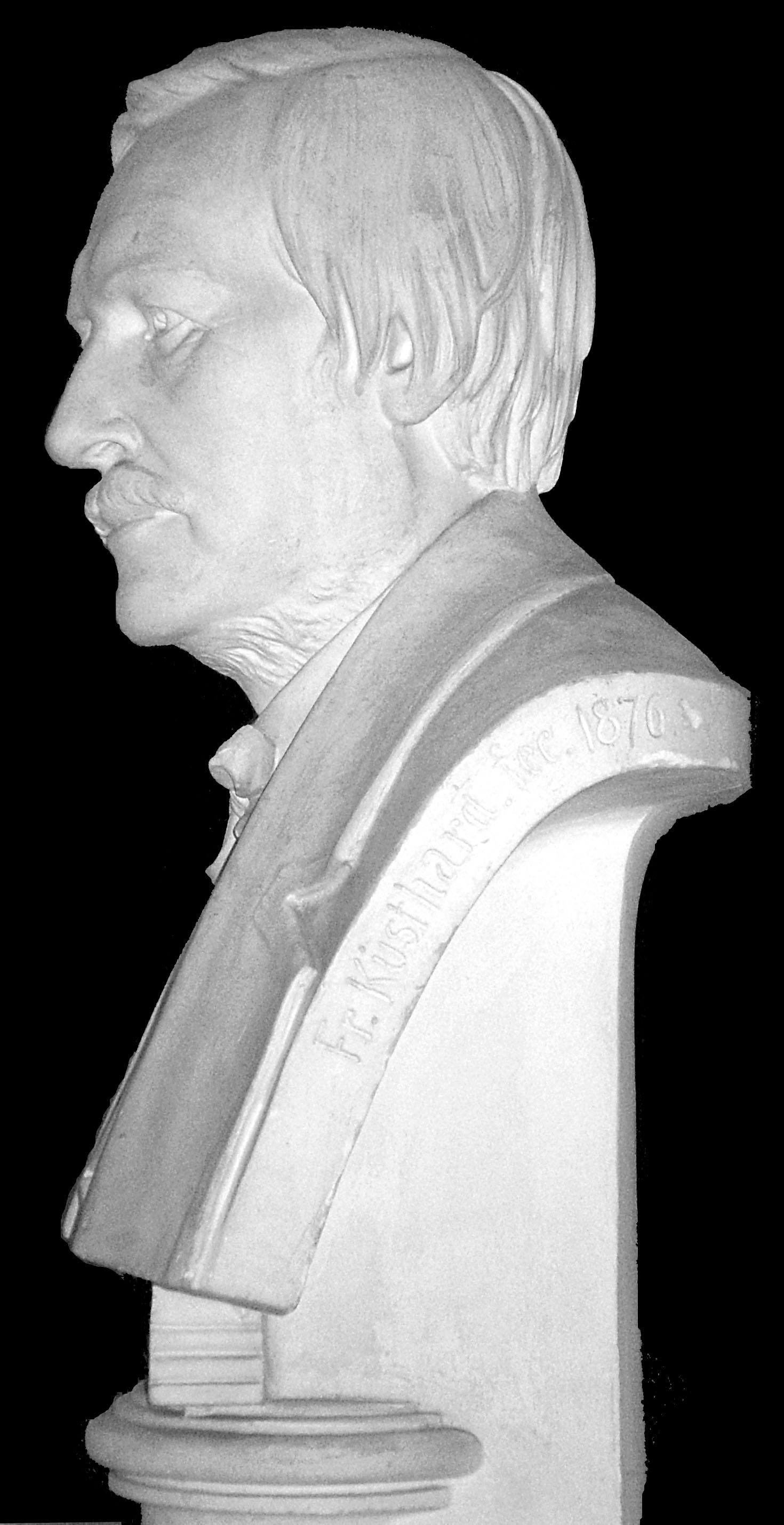
Wolfgang Sartorius von Waltershausen by Friedrich Küsthardt 1876

Wolfgang Sartorius Freiherr von Waltershausen (17 December 1809 – 16 March 1876) was a German geologist.

== Life and work ==
Waltershausen was born at Göttingen and educated at this city's university. There he devoted his attention to physical and natural science, and in particular to mineralogy. Waltershausen was named after Johann Wolfgang von Goethe, who was close friends with his parents. Waltershausen's father, Georg, was a writer, lecturer and professor of economics and history at Göttingen. Georg Sartorius (later Sartorius von Waltershausen) is best known in his role of translator and popularizer of Adam Smith's Wealth of Nations. His son, August, was a well known economist who specialized in American economy, and had at least one of his books translated into English.

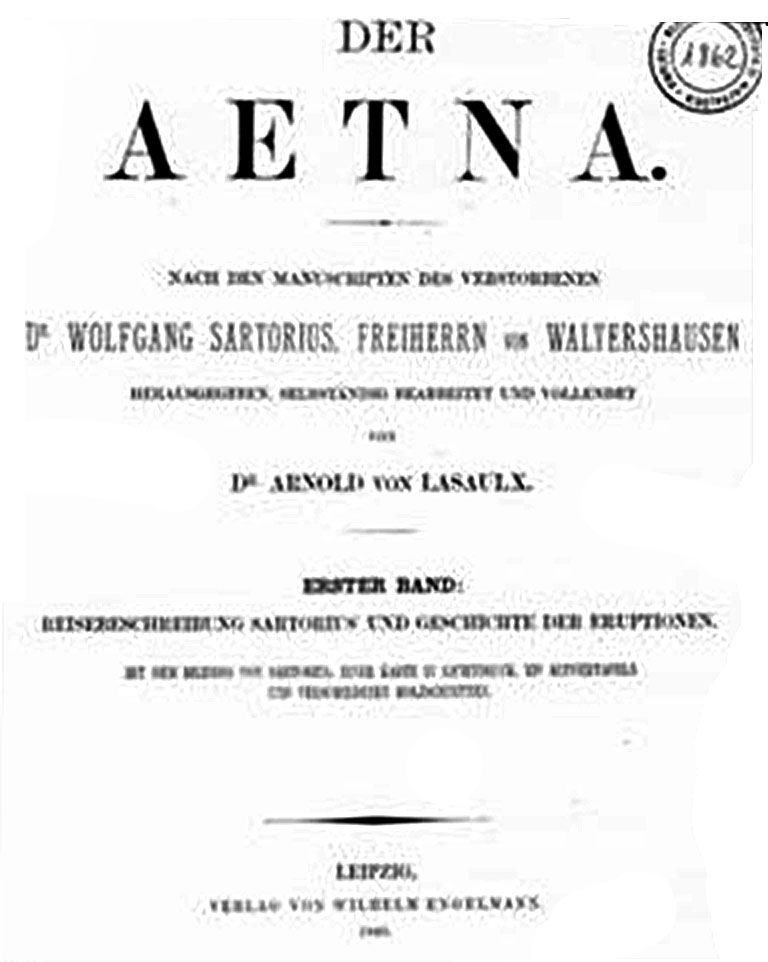
Front page of Der Aetna

During a tour in 1834–1835 Waltershausen carried out a series of magnetic observations in various parts of Europe. He then gave his attention to an exhaustive investigation of the volcano of Mount Etna, in Sicily, and carried on the work with some interruptions until 1843 including with Christian Heinrich Friedrich Peters. The chief result of this undertaking was his great Atlas des Ätna (1858–1861), in which he distinguished the lava streams formed during the later centuries.

After his return from Mount Etna, Waltershausen visited Iceland, and subsequently published Physisch-geographische Skizze von Island (1847), Über die vulkanischen Gesteine in Sizilien und Island (1853), and Geologischer Atlas von Island (1853). Meanwhile, he was appointed professor of mineralogy and geology at Göttingen, and held this post for about thirty years, until his death.

In 1866 Waltershausen published an important essay entitled Recherches sur les climats de l'époque actuelle et des époques anciennes; in this he expressed his belief that the Ice age was due to changes in the configuration of the Earth's surface. He died in Göttingen.

In 1880, Arnold von Lasaulx edited Waltershausen's notes and published the book Der Aetna (cover page pictured).

== Gauss zum Gedächtnis ==
Sartorius was the author of Gauss zum Gedächtnis (Gauss in Remembrance), a biographical profile of Satorius's friend and colleague Carl Friedrich Gauss, published in 1856 following Gauss's death in 1855. It is also the source of one of the most famous mathematical quotes, "Mathematics is the queen of the sciences", in full "Mathematics is the queen of the sciences and number theory is the queen of mathematics", and the famous story of Gauss as a young boy quickly finding the sum of an arithmetic series.

When Gauss died in Göttingen, two individuals gave eulogies at his funeral: Gauss's son-in-law Heinrich Ewald, and Waltershausen who represented the faculty in Göttingen.

Gauss zum Gedächtnis was translated into English as "Carl Friedrich Gauss - A Memorial" in 1966, by Gauss's great-granddaughter Helen Worthington Gauss.

== Commemorations ==
The mineral Sartorite as well as the Waltershausen Glacier in Northeast Greenland 73°52′N 24°20′W were named in his honour.
