= Georg Friedrich Sartorius =

German historian (1765–1828)

Georg Friedrich Sartorius (after 1827 Freiherr von Waltershausen; 25 August 1765 Kassel – 24 August 1828 Göttingen) was a German research historian, economist and professor at Göttingen University.

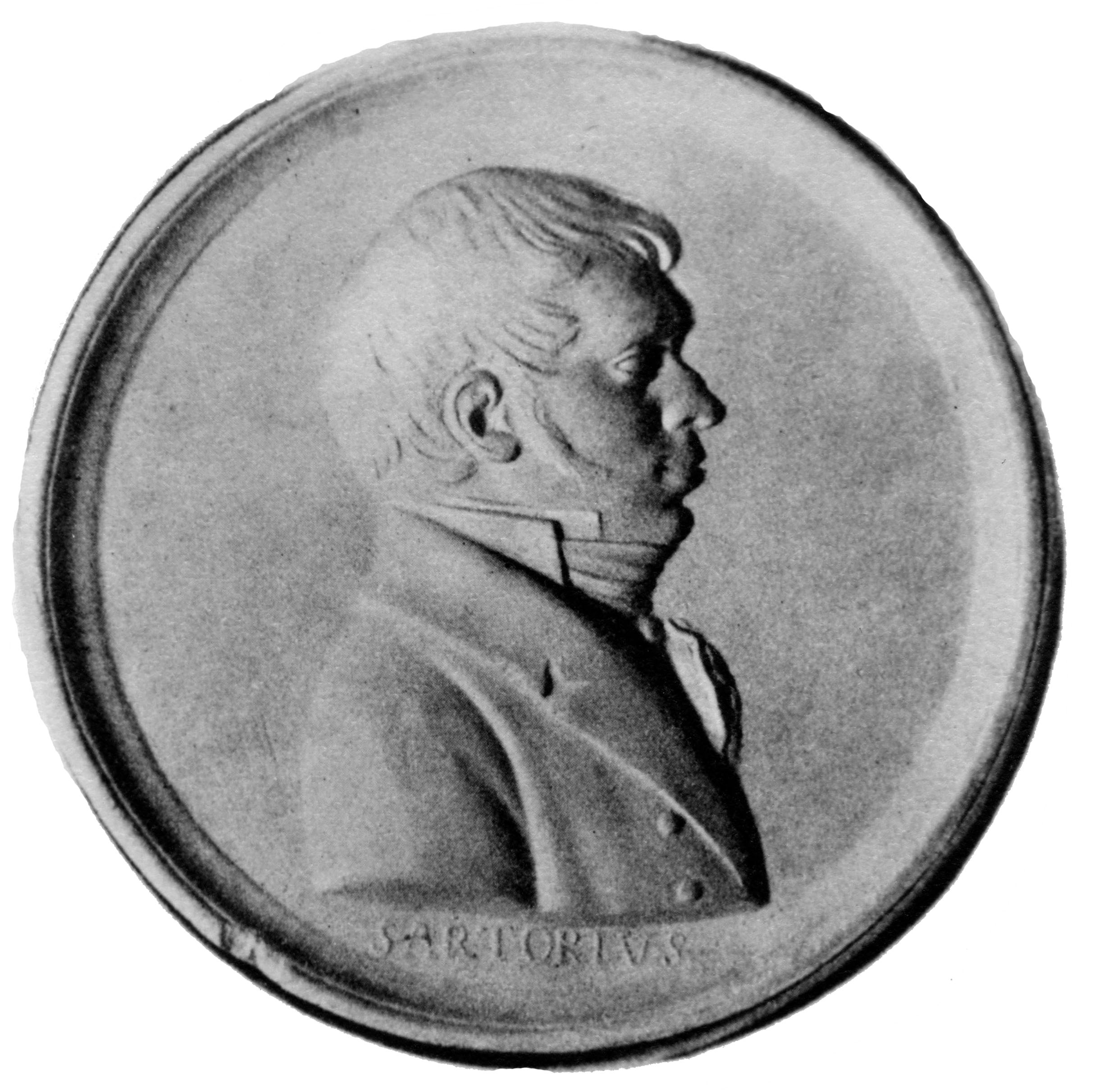

== Biography ==
Sartorius was born in Kassel, where he attended gymnasium. Then he studied theology and also orientalism (read by Michaeli) in Göttingen. Later he changed to history and started working at the Library there. He was appointed as professor in history in 1802.

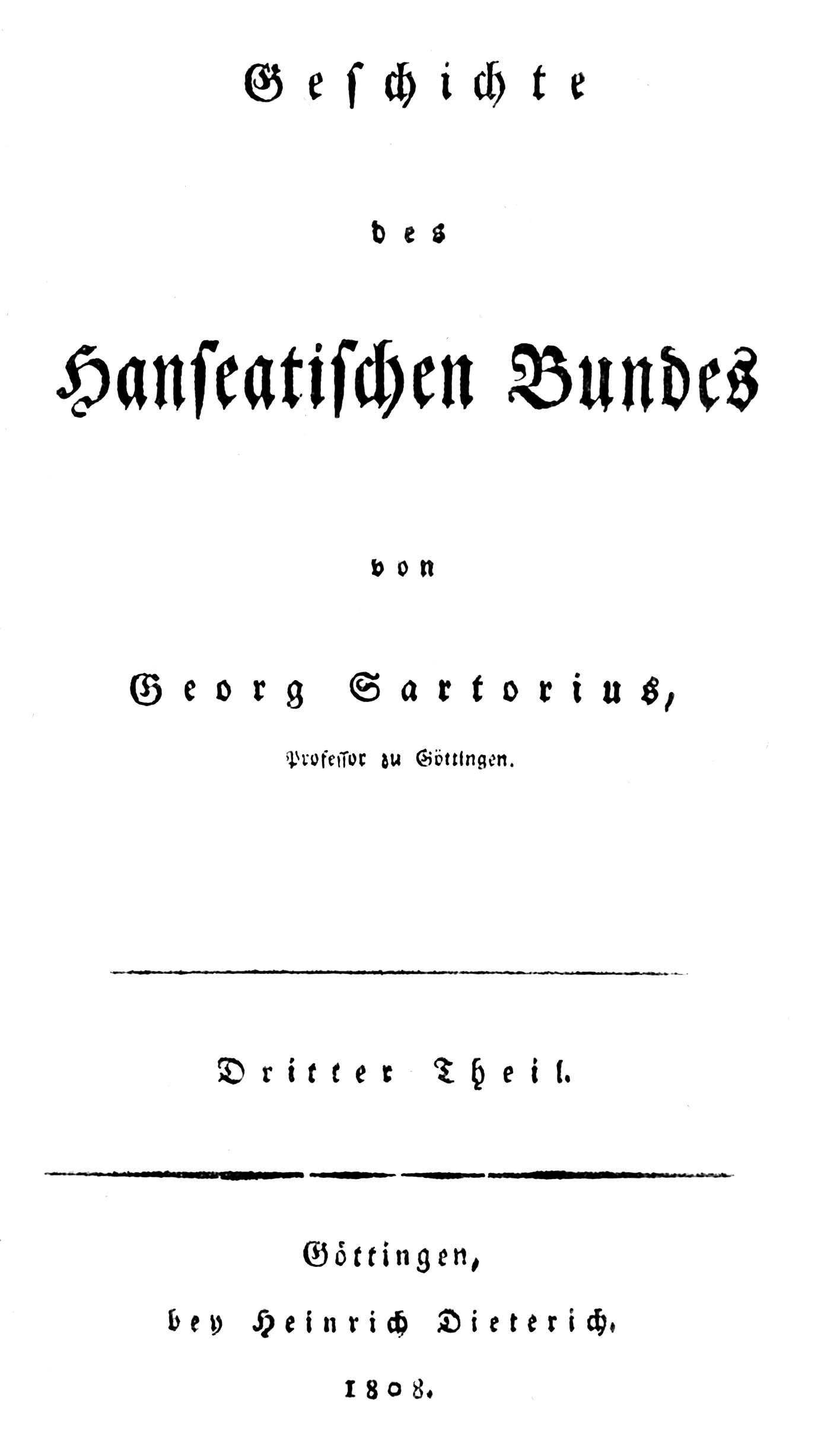
Title Page Third Volume 1808

His major work was his monograph Geschichte des Hanseatischen Bundes. (engl.: History of the Hanseatic League.) published in three volumes 1802–1808. His research on this topic was the first modern work on the Hanseatic League. A second edition prepared by him was published post mortem in 1830. He made a historical study of the rule of the Ostrogoths in Italy while professor at Göttingen (Versuch über die Regierung der Ostgothen wabrend ihrer Herrschaft in Italien; Hamburg, 1811), an extremely painstaking treatise on Ostrogothic administration, chiefly compiled from the letters of Cassiodorus. He is also known as translator and popularizer of Adam Smith's Wealth of Nations. As an economist he gave lectures on taxation.

Goethe was godparent of his second son, the geologist Wolfgang Sartorius von Waltershausen and grandfather of August Sartorius von Waltershausen, a well known economist who studied the American economy.
