= Hermann Schramm =

German opera singer

Hermann Schramm (1871–1951) was a German tenor who sang at the Oper Frankfurt in the 1920s and made several recordings for HMV Germany.

Although he was Jewish he escaped the deportation and subsequent fate of his colleagues at the Oper Frankfurt, Richard Breitenfeld, Magda Spiegel, bass Hans Erl and violinist Moses Slager, since he was married to an "Aryan" wife, and his children had been raised as Christians. Hans Meissner, head of the opera, intervened personally for Schramm with the mayor in 1933 when Erl and others had to be dismissed from the opera. A chance anecdote reveals Schramm, then 72, as a witness in the 1950 trial of low-ranking Gestapo officer Heinrich Baab who scoured the streets of Frankfurt after 1940 looking for Jews. Schramm was witness to the arrest of a Jewish woman caught with a tramway ticket in her handbag – evidence of her using public transport. Schramm attempted to intervene and was repeatedly struck in the face by Baab, but not himself arrested.

== Recordings ==
- Schubert; "Ein Jüngling liebt ein Mädchen"
- Johann Strauss; duet from Der Zigeunerbaron "Wer uns getraut," with Carl Reich
- Loewe; ballad "Glockentürmers Töchterlein" with Carl Reich
