= Rudi Stephan =

German composer (1887–1915)

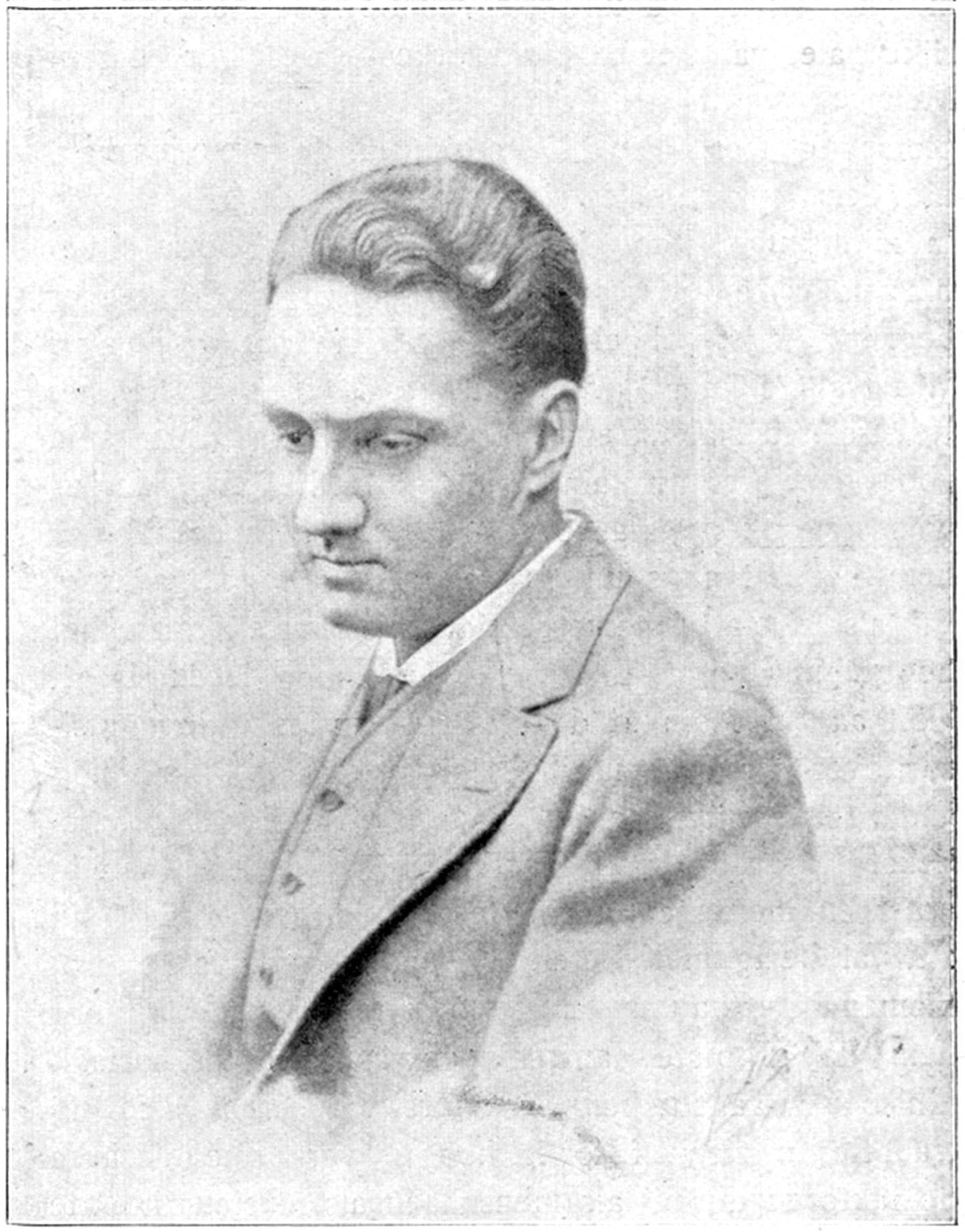
- Born: 29 July 1887; Worms, Grand Duchy of Hesse, German Empire
- Died: 29 September 1915 (aged 28); Chodaczków Wielki, Kingdom of Galicia and Lodomeria, Austria-Hungary
- Education: Hoch Conservatory
- Occupation: Composer

Rudi Stephan (29 July 1887 – 29 September 1915) was a German composer of great promise who was considered one of the leading talents of his generation. He was killed in action during World War I.

== Life ==
Stephan was born at Worms, Grand Duchy of Hesse, the son of the privy councillor and politician Karl Stephan who was also the head of the local Richard-Wagner-Verband. Stephan became a composition pupil of Bernhard Sekles at the Hoch Conservatory in Frankfurt, and of Rudolf Louis in Munich, where he settled after completing his studies in 1908.

He left only a few works: his liking for pointedly neutral titles along the lines of 'Music for ...' has caused him to be seen as a forerunner of the 'New Objectivity' of the post-war era, but his music is in fact in a hyper-expressive late-Romantic idiom which has more plausibly been seen by some as a kind of proto-Expressionism. His father was able to finance the performance of his early works, which at first met with incomprehension, but the premiere of his 1912 Music for Orchestra in Worms was a major critical breakthrough. He completed his only opera, Die ersten Menschen, shortly after the outbreak of the First World War. It was eventually premiered in Frankfurt, five years after the composer had been killed in action at Chodaczków Wielki near Tarnopol on the Galician Front.

His complete extant orchestral works were recorded by the Melbourne Symphony Orchestra conducted by Oleg Caetani.

== List of works ==
- Opus 1 for Orchestra
- Liebeszauber for baritone and orchestra, after Hebbel (1907, rev. 1911)
- Music for Orchestra [No. 1] (1910)
- Grotesque for violin and piano
- Music for Violin and Orchestra (1910, rev. 1913)
- Music for Seven Stringed Instruments (2 violins, viola, violoncello, doublebass, harp and piano) (1907–11; unfinished revision for piano quintet, 1914)
- Music for Orchestra [No. 2] (1912, rev. 1913) [NB this work is often said to be a revision of the 1910 Music for Orchestra, but they are in fact unrelated]
- Die ersten Menschen (1909–14), opera after the erotic mystery-play by Otto Borngräber

== Legacy ==
In Worms a school was named Rudi-Stephan-Gymnasium.
