= Norman Fulton =

English composer, broadcaster and teacher

Robert Norman Fulton (23 January 1909 – 5 August 1980) was an English-born composer, broadcaster and teacher of Scottish ancestry.

== Life and career ==
Fulton was born in London but educated in Scotland at Glasgow High School. From 1929 until 1933 he studied harmony and composition with Norman Demuth at the Royal Academy of Music. He worked for the British Broadcasting Corporation from 1936 until 1960, composing much incidental music for radio features between 1937 and the early 1950s, including the music for Children's Hour throughout the 1940s. In 1953 he was appointed Head of West Regional Music. From 1963 until February 1967 he was the presenter of Music to Remember on the BBC Home Service. In 1966 he returned to the Royal Academy as professor of harmony and composition.

He married Olga Pett Ridge, daughter of the novelist William Pett Ridge, in 1936, and there were a son and a daughter. He lived at 55 Clarence Road, Bickley in Kent. Fulton died of lung cancer at Guy's Hospital on 5 August 1980, aged 71. His daughter Jill Pett Fulton had a successful career as a ballerina and married the conductor Karl Anton Rickenbacher.

== Selected works ==
Fulton composed three symphonies. No. 1, the Sinfonia pastorale, was first heard in Bournemouth in 1951 and received its first London concert performance at the Proms in 1954. The Musette movement proved the most striking, and has been published separately. There is also a 15-minute Serenade for Strings and the Waltz Rhapsody for piano and orchestra.

His chamber music includes a Piano Trio, the Introduction, Air and Reel for viola and piano (premiered by Watson Forbes in 1949), and the Scottish Suite for recorder and keyboard (written for Carl Dolmetsch in 1954 and still frequently performed). There is a modern recording of the Sonata da camera for viola and piano, composed in 1952. For solo piano Fulton wrote the Prelude, Elegy and Toccata, which was broadcast by Kendall Taylor in 1956 and remained in his repertoire. There are around 50 songs and choral settings.

Fulton wrote much incidental music for BBC radio, including a series of features written by D. G. Bridson, and scored several wartime and post-war British information film documentaries.

=== Concert music ===
- Violin Sonata No 1 (1939)
- Requiem for Strings (1941)
- Serenade for Strings (1944)
- Piano Sonatina (1945)
- Five Entertainments for small orchestra (1946)
- Sonata da camera for viola and piano, written for Leonard Rubens (1946)
- Waltz, Air, and Polka for two pianos (1947)
- Introduction, Air, and Reel for viola and piano (1949)
- Overture for orchestra (1950)
- Piano Trio (1950)
- Symphony No. 1, Sinfonia pastorale (1950)
- Shakespeare in Arden, divertimento in seven movements for chorus and orchestra (1951)
- Three Movements for Clarinet and Piano, dedicated to Jack Brymer and Henry Bronkhurst (1951)
- Prelude, Elegy, and Toccata for piano (1954)
- Scottish Suite for recorder and piano or harpsichord (fp. 7 May 1954)
- Symphony No. 2 in one movement, Op. 21 (1955)
- Curtain Wells Sketches for small orchestra (1959)
- Augury, ballet (I960)
- Waltz Rhapsody for piano and orchestra (1961)
- Oboe Sonatina (1962)
- Little Suite for piano duet (1963)
- Symphonic Dances (1965)
- Fantasy on a Ground for piano (1969)
- Night Music for flute and piano (1969)
- Dance Miniatures for piano duet (1970)
- Three Pieces for piano (1970)
- Symphony No. 3, Mary Stuart (1971–73)

=== Songs ===
- The Cakewalk, W.W.Gibson (1943)
- Christ Keep the Hollow Land, William Morris (1953)
- I am the Great Sun, Charles Causley
- I walked where in their talking graves, Charles Causley
- Never Look Back, Will Redgrave
- Released by Love, W H Auden (1967)
- See him ride the roaring air, Charles Causley
- Songs in Arden, three Shakespeare songs for unaccompanied chorus (1958)
- Songs in Solitude, Tennyson, Longfellow, Walter Scott, suite of three part songs, accompanied choral (1965)
- This Bread I Break, Dylan Thomas (1938)
- To the Moon, Thomas Hardy (1953)
- Three Songs of Fiona McLeod, 'The War Song of the Vikings', 'The Valley of Silence', 'The Bells of Youth' (1962)
- Two Christmas Songs ('No Room at the Inn' and 'Make We Merry')
- Two Shakespeare Songs ('Come away, Death' and '0 mistress mine')
- Two Songs of Thomas Lodge (Love in my Bosom', and 'Lament in Spring')
- Willow song (Shakespeare)

=== Incidental music for radio ===
- The Silver Spring (1937), Shakespeare poetry
- Captain Murderer (1938) (short story by Charles Dickens)
- Coronation Scott, script by D. G. Bridson (1938)
- Warwick the Kingmaker, script by D. G. Bridson (1938)
- Tale of the North Sea, script by D. G. Bridson (1939)
- Changing Keys (1942), play by Maurice Brown
- The Builders (1943), script by D. G. Bridson
- Jan the Dreamer (1943), play by Olive Dehn
- If (1944), play by Lord Dunsany
- An American Goes Home (1945), script by D. G. Bridson
- An Englishman Looks at Norway (1945), script by D. G. Bridson
- This was an American (1945), script by D. G. Bridson
- Ara's Christmas Play (1946)
- Aaron's Field (1947), script by D. G. Bridson
- Pippa Passes (1949), adaption of Robert Browning
- A Winter's Tale (1949)
- The Passionate Elopement (in five half-hour parts), Compton Mackenzie (1953)

=== Film scores ===
- A Soldier Comes Home (1945) (director John Eldridge, writer Dylan Thomas)
- Return to Action (1947) (Central Office of Information)
- Colonel Bogey (1948)
