= Walter Schneider (bass) =

German opera singer

Walter Schneider (1878–1935) was a German operatic bass.

== Professional career ==
Born in Bretzenheim, his initial musical ambition was to become a conductor, but in the end he decided on a singing career. His first engagement was at the Cologne Opera in 1903. During the 1904-1905 season he was engaged at the Stadttheater in Aachen. In 1905 he moved to the Frankfurt Opera: he was a member of this opera house for the remainder of his professional career, singing more than 200 roles in over 4000 performances. His repertoire included several major Wagner bass roles (Gurnemanz in Parsifal, King Marke in Tristan und Isolde, Fasolt and Hunding in Der Ring des Nibelungen a.o.). He sang in several world premiere performances: Schreker's Der ferne Klang (18 August 1912), Das Spielwerk und die Prinzessin (15 March 1913) and Die Gezeichneten (25 April 1918), Delius's Fennimore and Gerda (21 October 1919), Rudi Stephan's Die ersten Menschen (1 July 1920), and d'Albert's Der Golem (14 November 1926). In December 1934 he made his final appearance in Frankfurt as Mephisto in Gounod's Faust, the same role in which he had made his Frankfurt debut nineteen years earlier. He died in Frankfurt on 22 May 1935.
