= Florian Cerny =

German-Australian actor and operatic baritone

Florian Cerny (born 4 October 1946 in Bavaria) is a German-Australian actor and operatic baritone.

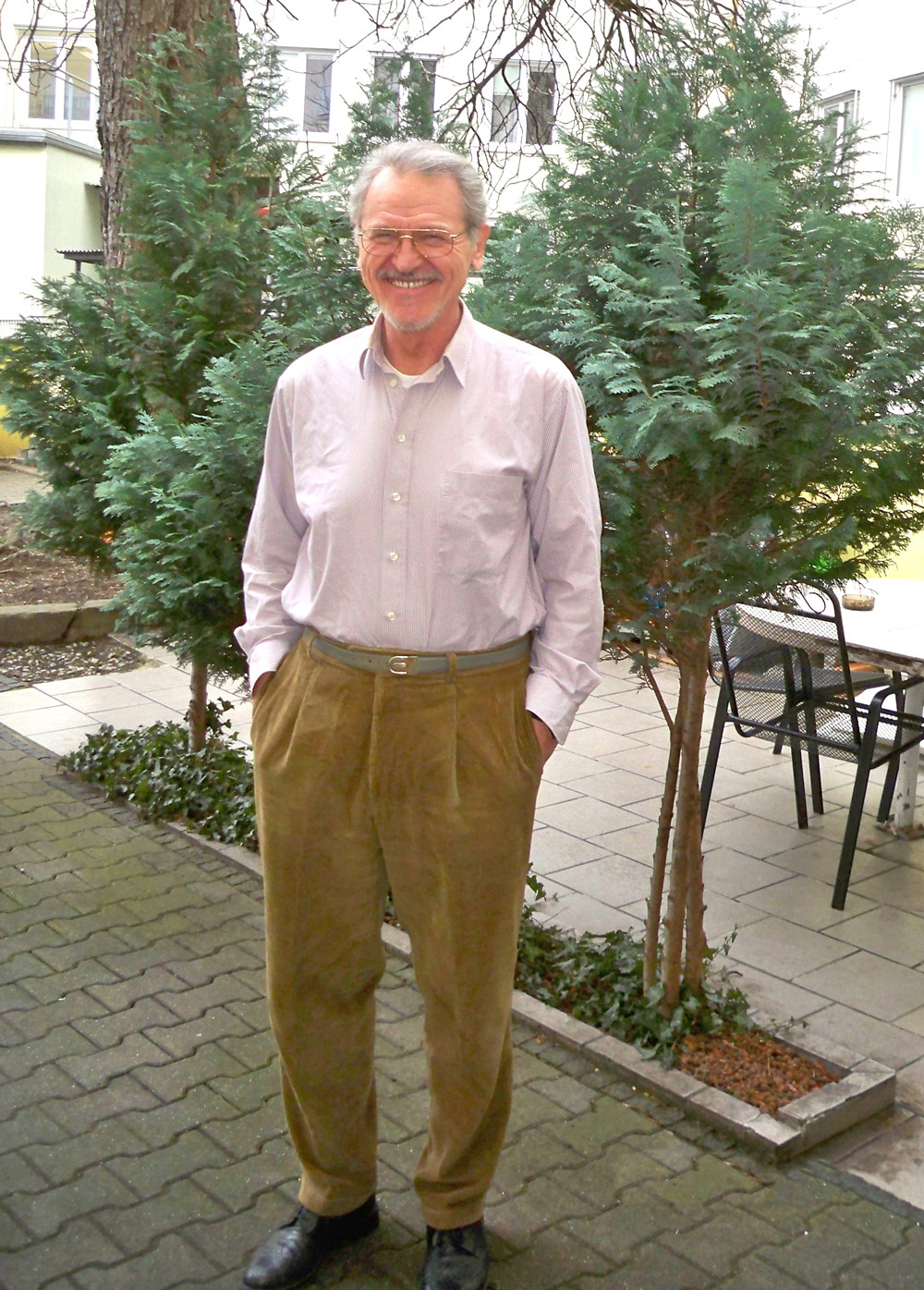
Florian Cerny 2016
