= Elisabet Strid =

Swedish actress (born 1976)

Elisabet Strid (born 25 January 1976) is a Swedish operatic soprano. She has been particularly successful in the operas of Richard Wagner and Richard Strauss, performing at major venues including the Bolshoi Opera, Covent Garden Royal Opera, Royal Opera Copenhagen and the Teatro Real Madrid.

== Early life ==
Born in Malmö on 25 January 1976, Elisabet Strid showed interest in music as a child, singing rock and roll songs with her younger brother. She was a successful pupil at the music high school in Malmö where she discovered her interest in Wagner as a member of the school's opera ensemble. She spent some four years as a member of an amateur opera group in the city. When she was 18, she became a pupil of Karin Mang-Habashy who recognized her talent for opera. She went on to study under Mang-Habashy and Ivan Anguélov at the Opera Academy in Stockholm. She was then awarded a scholarship from the Royal Swedish Academy of Music to tour ten cities in the USA with a pianist.

== Career ==
While studying, Strid made her debut in July 2003 at the Vadstena Academy in the title role of Carl Unander-Scharin's opera Byrgitta. She made her official debut in 2005 in the Nordlandsopera in Umeå as Liu in Puccini's Turandot. She later received engagements of the Royal Opera in Stockholm and the Malmö Opera. She is recognized for Wagnerian roles including Venus in Tannhäuser, Sieglinde in Die Walküre, Brünhilde in Siegfried and the leading role in Tristan und Isolde. In 2013, she made her debut in Bayreuth as Freia in Der Ring des Nibelungen.

Strid has performed in the world's major opera houses, including those in Berlin, Stockholm, Copenhagen, Madrid, Moscow, and in London, where she appeared for the first time in 2024. She has also made concert appearances with leading orchestras.
