= August Sartorius von Waltershausen =

German economist

August Sartorius Freiherr von Waltershausen (1852–1938) was a German economist.

== Biography ==
He was born in Göttingen, the son of Wolfgang Sartorius von Waltershausen. He was educated in the University of Göttingen, became professor at Zurich in 1885, and in 1888 was appointed professor of economics (German: Nationalökonomie) in Strassburg, where he remained until 1918. He is the father of Hermann Wolfgang von Waltershausen (Göttingen, 12 October 1882 - Munich, 14 June 1954), a German composer, conductor, teacher and writer.

== Works ==
His principal works deal with American economic and industrial problems and include

- Die Zukunft des Deutschtums in den Vereinigten Staaten (The future of German culture in the United States, 1885) (ZBZOnline)
- Nordamerikanische Gewerkschaften (North American unions, 1886)
- Moderner Sozialismus in den Vereinigten Staaten von Amerika (Modern socialism in the United States of America, 1890)
- Arbeitsverfassung der englischen Kolonien in Nordamerika (Work contracts in the English colonies of North America, 1894)
- Handelsbilanz der Vereinigten Staaten von Amerika (Trade balance of the United States of America, 1901)

He was one of the editors of the Handwörterbuchs der Staatswirtschaften.
