= Hans Erl =

German opera singer

- Born: 1882; Warsaw or Vienna
- Died: 1942; Deported to Auschwitz concentration camp
- Occupation: Operatic bass
- Years active: 1904–1933
- Organizations: Oper Frankfurt (first bass); Raimund Theater

Hans Tobias Erl (Warsaw or Vienna 1882 – Deported to Auschwitz, 1942?) was a German operatic bass.

== Professional career ==
He began his actual career in the theatre during the 1908-1909 season at the Raimund-Theater in Vienna, after already having sung in the world premiere performance of Oscar Straus' operetta Die lustigen Nibelungen at the Wiener Carl-Theater in 1904. Further engagements were at the Stadttheater Augsburg (1911–1913), the Stadttheater Elberfeld (1913–1914), and the Stadttheater Chemnitz (1914–1918, interrupted by military service during World War I in 1914-1915). In 1918 he began a fifteen-year engagement with the Frankfurt Opera as the first bass, where he became one of the ensemble's best known singers. He was dismissed from the Opera on 11 June 1933.

His repertoire included the major basso profondo roles (Padre Guardiano in Verdi's La forza del destino, Il Commendatore in Mozart's Don Giovanni and Sarastro in Mozart's Die Zauberflöte), and the major Wagner bass roles (the Landgrave in Tannhäuser, Pogner in Die Meistersinger von Nürnberg, Hunding in Die Walküre, Gurnemanz in Parsifal). He sang the role of the King in the world premiere performance of Franz Schreker's Der Schatzgräber (21 January 1920).

== Holocaust ==
Being a Jew, he was fired from the Frankfurt Opera in 1933. The Jews were forced to gather in the Festhalle Frankfurt and Erl was forced to sing "In Diesen Heilgen Hallen". He was deported in 1942 and murdered (probably the same year) in Auschwitz.
