= Edwin Pugh =

English writer

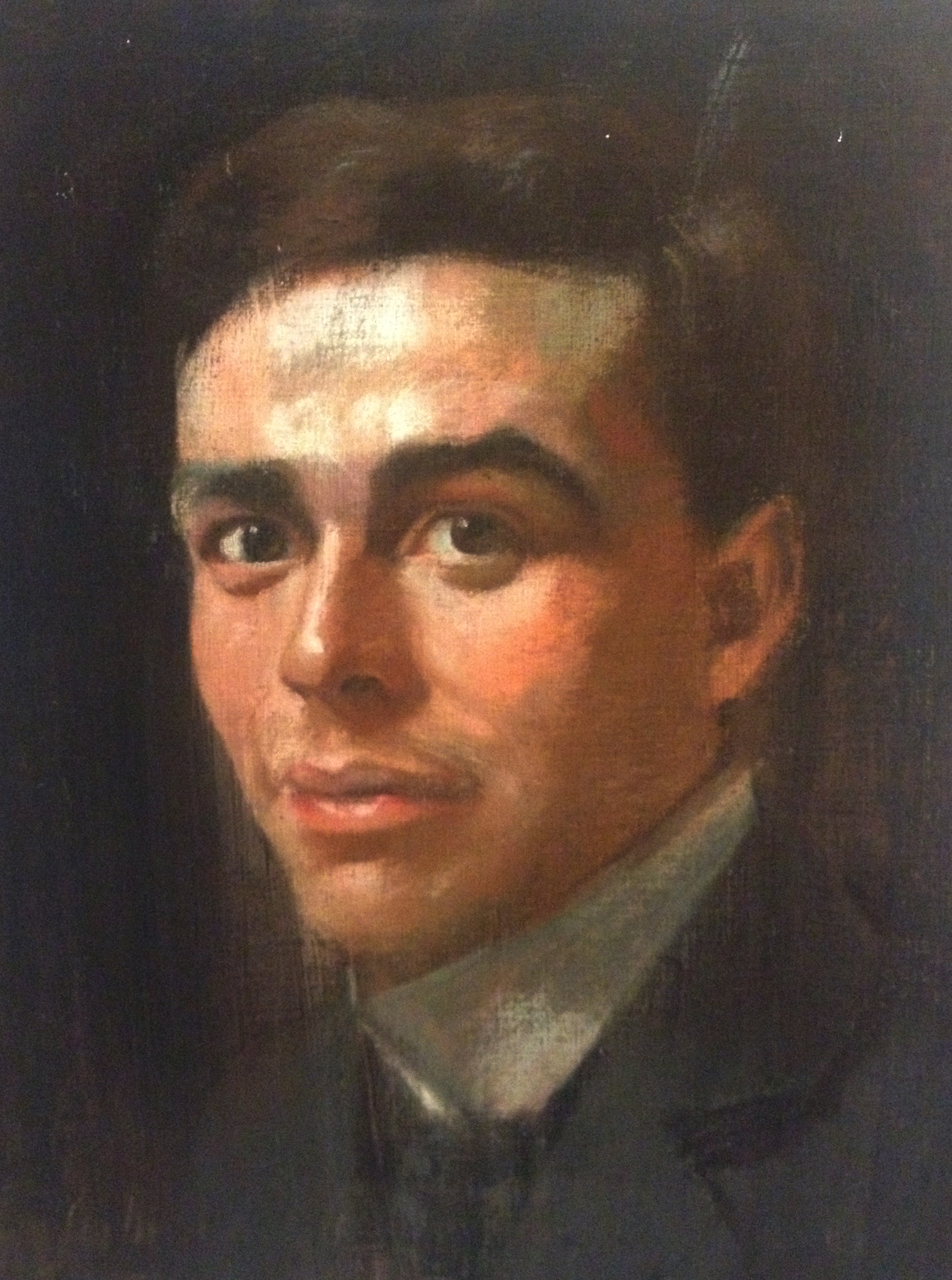
Portrait of Edwin Pugh

Edwin William Pugh (22 January 1874 - 5 February 1930) was an English writer. He published 33 books, primarily novels and short story collections, and focused on working-class "cockney school" storylines.

The Modernist Journals Project finds that "Pugh's fiction largely goes unread today, and those critics who have read him generally accuse him of sentimentality and melodrama." He also wrote literary criticism praising the works of Charles Dickens.

== Life ==
Pugh was born at 47, Foley Street, Marylebone, London, the second of four children of David Walter Pugh (1843-1887), a theatrical property maker and player with the Covent Garden orchestra. After positive reviews of his first two books, A Street in Suburbia (1895) (a collection of short stories, published when he was 21 years old) and The Man of Straw (1896), Pugh left his job as a clerk to write full-time. After a few years of good fortune, however, Pugh's working class output lost favor, and he struggled with poverty for the rest of his life. He died in London on 5 February 1930.

== Bibliography ==
Works published by Pugh include:

- A Street In Suburbia (1895)
- The Man of Straw (1896)
- Tony Drum: a Cockney Boy (1898)
- King Circumstance (1898)
- The Rogue's Paradise: An Extravaganza (1898) (with Charles Gleig)
- Mother-sister (1900)
- The Heritage (1901) (with G. Burchett)
- The Stumbling-Block (1903)
- The Fruit of the Vine (1904)
- The Purple Head (1905)
- The Spoilers (1906)
- The Shuttlecock (1907)
- The Broken Honeymoon (1908)
- Charles Dickens: The Apostle of the People (1908)
- The Enchantress (1908)
- Peter Vandy: a biography in outline (1909)
- The Mockingbird (1910)
- The Charles Dickens Originals (1912)
- The City of the World: A Book About London and the Londoners (1912)
- Harry the Cockney (1912)
- The Proof of the Pudding (1913)
- Punch and Judy (1914)
- The Cockney at Home: Stories and Studies of London Life and Character (1914)
- The Phantom Peer: An Extravaganza (1914)
- The Quick and The Dead: A Tragedy of Temperaments (1914)
- A Book of Laughter (1916)
- Slings and Arrows: A Book of Essays (1916)
- The Eyes of a Child (1917)
- The Great Unborn: A Dream of To-morrow (1918)
- The Way of the Wicked (1921)
- The Secret Years: Further Adventures of Tobias Morgan (1923)
- The World Is My Oyster (1924)
- Empty Vessels (1926)

== See also ==
- Boll, Theophilus Ernest Martin. The works of Edwin Pugh (1874-1930): a chapter in the novel of humble London life (1934)
- Brome, Vincent. Four Realist Novelists : Arthur Morrison, Edwin Pugh, Richard Whiteing, William Pett Ridge (1965)
