= Magda Spiegel =

German opera singer

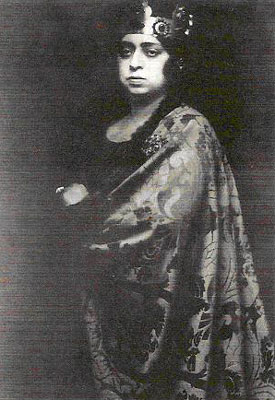
Magda Spiegel

Magda Spiegel (1887–1944) was a German contralto who was a member of the Frankfurt Opera ensemble and was murdered in the Auschwitz concentration camp. The baritone Richard Breitenfeld, also of the Frankfurt Opera, shared the same fate.

Peter Hugh Reed wrote in American Record Guide, 1949:

I have also learned with the deepest regret about the similar death of the contralto Magda Spiegel, from Frankfurt. She made some excellent acoustic records in the early 1920s for Odeon, Vox and Homochard – I remember her as a thrilling Adriano in Wagner's Rienzi when the Frankfurt opera company visited Holland in 1934.
