= Karl Anton Rickenbacher =

Swiss conductor

Karl Anton Rickenbacher (20 May 1940 – 28 February 2014) was a Swiss conductor.

Born in Basel, Rickenbacher studied at the Berlin Conservatory with Herbert von Karajan. He took part in master classes with Pierre Boulez. He was an assistant conductor at the Zürich Opera from 1966 to 1969. He served as first Kapellmeister of the 'Stadt Buhnen Freiburg' from 1969 to 1975. He was music director of the Neue Philharmonie Westfalen [New Westphalian Philharmonic] from 1976 to 1985. He was chief conductor of the BBC Scottish Symphony Orchestra from 1978 to 1980. He was appointed principal guest conductor of the Belgian Brussels Philharmonic in 1987 (then called the 'BRT Philharmonic Orchestra').

Rickenbacher's commercial recordings include those of the student symphonies of Richard Strauss, as part of his set of recordings called "The Unknown Richard Strauss".

Rickenbacher was married to the ballerina Jill Pett Fulton, daughter of the composer Norman Fulton. He died of a heart attack in 2014, aged 73.

Cultural offices
| Preceded by Christopher Seaman | Chief Conductor, BBC Scottish Symphony Orchestra; 1978–1980 | Succeeded by Jerzy Maksymiuk |
