= Ludwig Rottenberg =

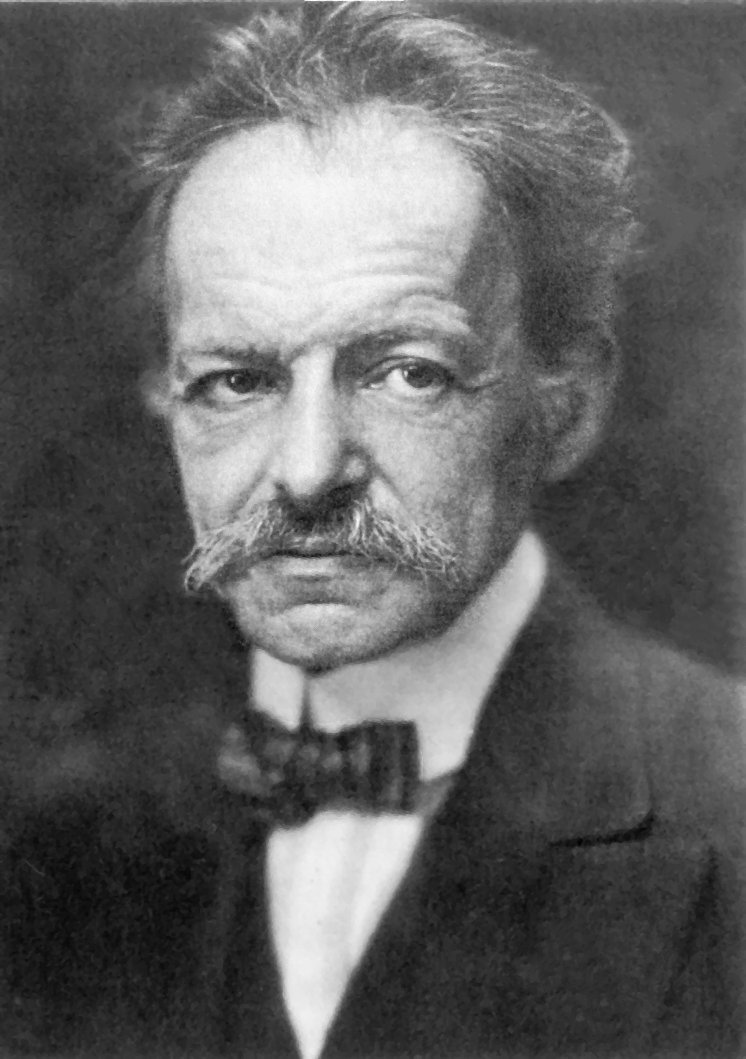
- Born: 11 October 1865
- Died: 6 May 1932 (aged 66)

Ludwig Rottenberg (11 October 1865 – 6 May 1932) was an Austrian/German composer and conductor.

== Biography ==
Rottenberg came from a German-speaking Jewish family in Czernowitz, the then-capital of Bukovina, which was part of the Austrian-Hungarian Monarchy at the time. He studied music in his birthplace, and later at the Vienna Conservatory.

He conducted an amateur orchestra and worked as a Lieder accompanist during his studies. He started his professional conducting career at the Brno opera house.

In 1892 he succeeded Felix Dessoff as Erster Kapellmeister at the Frankfurt Opera. He was recommended for the position by Johannes Brahms and Hans von Bülow, being preferred to two other famous applicants, Richard Strauss and Felix Mottl.

He held this position until 1926. During his tenure he worked with six different artistic directors, and helped establish the Frankfurt Opera as one of the leading opera houses of its time. Numerous contemporary operas were staged there during this period, among others the world premiere performances of Der ferne Klang (1912), Die Gezeichneten (1918) and Der Schatzgräber (1920) by Franz Schreker. Other important performances, partly German premieres, included Hans Pfitzner's Der arme Heinrich (1897), Claude Debussy's Pelléas et Mélisande (1907), Richard Strauss’ Elektra (1909) and further operas by Ferruccio Busoni, Leoš Janáček, Béla Bartók and Paul Hindemith.

One of his works was also premiered at the Frankfurt Opera in 1915: his one-act opera Die Geschwister, composed in 1913 after a poem by Johann Wolfgang von Goethe. Apart from that, Rottenberg primarily composed Lieder and piano works.

His daughter Gertrud (1900–1967) married the composer Paul Hindemith in 1924.

Rottenberg died in Frankfurt am Main in 1932.
