= William Pett Ridge =

English novelist (1859–1930)

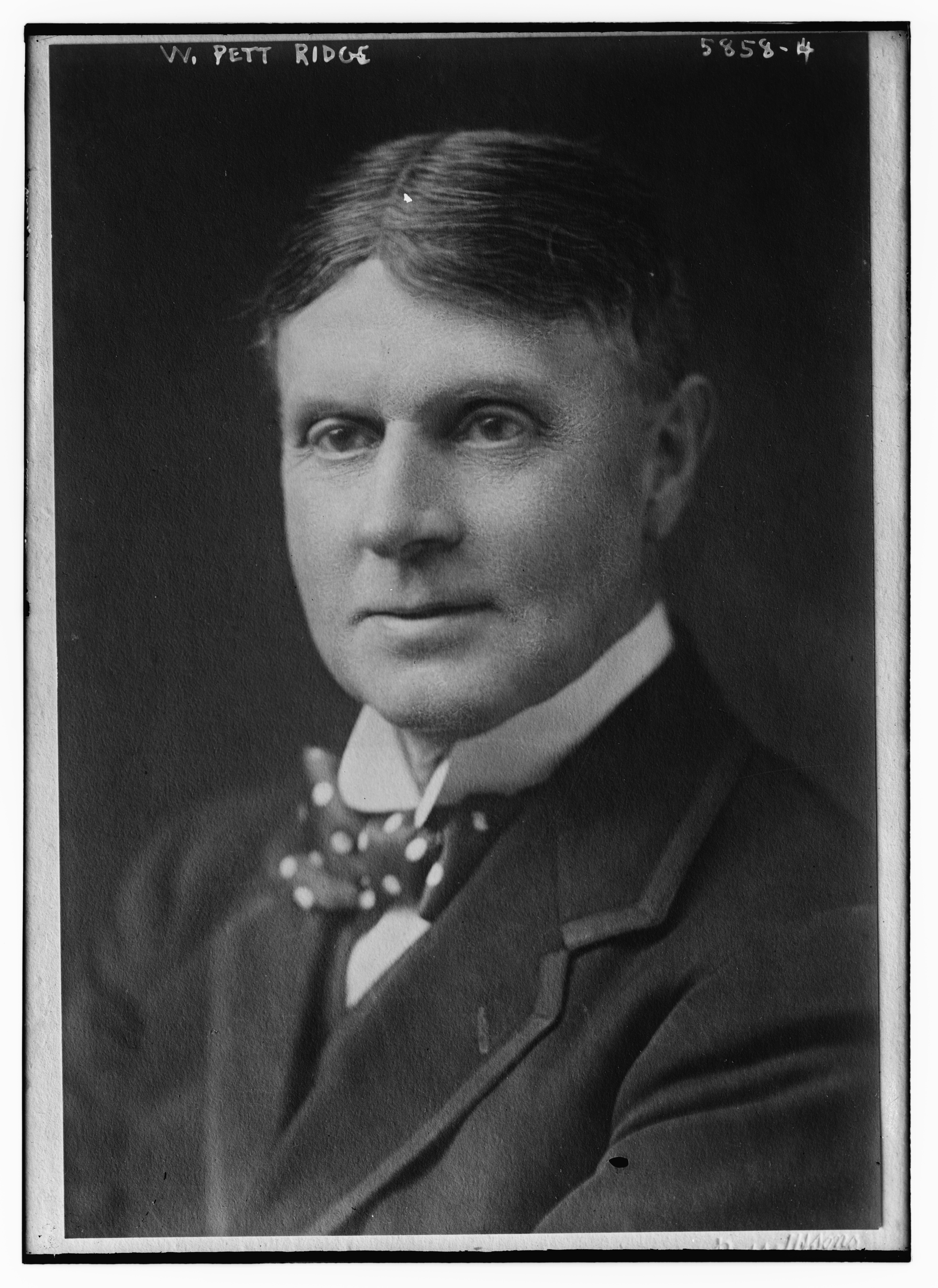
Pett Ridge c. 1920–1925

William Pett Ridge (22 April 1859 – 2 October 1930) was an English fiction writer, born at Chartham, near Canterbury, Kent, and educated at Marden, Kent, and at the Birkbeck Institute, London. He was for some time a clerk in the Railway Clearing House, and began about 1891 to write humorous sketches for the St James's Gazette and other papers.

== Writings and character ==
His published first novel was A Clever Wife (1895), but he secured his first striking success with his fifth, Mord Em'ly (1898), which showed his ability to draw humorous portraits of lower-class life.

In 1924, fellow novelist Edwin Pugh recalled his early memories of Pett Ridge in the 1890s:

I see him most clearly, as he was in those days, through a blue haze of tobacco smoke. We used sometimes to travel together from Waterloo to Worcester Park on our way to spend a Saturday afternoon and evening with H. G. Wells. Pett Ridge does not know it, but it was through watching him fill his pipe, as he sat opposite me in a stuffy little railway compartment, that I completed my own education as a smoker... Pett Ridge had a small, dark, rather spiky moustache in those days, and thick, dark, sleek hair which is perhaps not quite so thick or dark, though hardly less sleek nowadays than it was then.

Pett Ridge was a compassionate man, giving generously of both his time and money to charity. He founded the Babies Home at Hoxton in 1907 and was an ardent supporter of many organisations that had the welfare of children as their object. This charitable zeal, and the fact that he established himself as the leading novelist of London life and character, led to him being marked as a natural successor of Dickens. On 7 January 1914, in King's Hall, Covent Garden, he was a member of the jury in the mock trial of John Jasper for the murder of Edwin Drood. At this all-star event, arranged by The Dickens Fellowship, G. K. Chesterton was Judge and George Bernard Shaw appeared as foreman of the jury.

All his friends considered Pett Ridge to be one of life's natural bachelors. They were rather surprised therefore in 1909 when he married Olga Hentschel. Four of his books, including Mord Em'ly, were adapted as films in the early 1920s, all with scripts by Eliot Stannard. Pett Ridge's great popularity as a novelist in the early part of the century declined in the latter years of his life. His work was considered to be rather old fashioned, though he still wrote and had published at least one book in each year in the final decade of his life. His last work, Led by Westmacott, was published in the year after his death.

William Pett Ridge died, aged 71, at his home, Ampthill, Willow Grove, Chislehurst, on 29 September 1930 and was cremated at West Norwood on 2 October 1930. His ashes were taken away by his surviving family, his wife, a son, and his daughter Olga, a pianist and teacher who married the composer Norman Fulton in 1936. His headstone in St Nicholas Churchyard, Chislehurst describes him as a ‘Novelist and Friend of the Cockneys’.

== Legacy ==
Pett Ridge completed over sixty volumes of novels, short stories, and two memoirs. But by the end of his life his popularity had waned. George Malcolm Johnson has said that he:

...is likely to remain a minor writer because he was innovative neither in style nor subject matter; his main flaw was that he ignored the devastating impact of severe deprivation on his east London characters and instead perpetuated the sentimental Victorian myth that cockneys with enough character could triumph over all obstacles.

== Works ==
His books and stories include:

- Eighteen of Them (1894) (Under the pseudonym of Warwick Simpson.)
- Telling Stories from St. James Gazette (1895)
- Minor Dialogues (1895)
- A Clever Wife (1895)
- An Important Man and Others (1896)
- Second Opportunity of Mr Staplehurst (1896) Online
- Secretary to Bayne M.P. (1897)
- Three Women and Mr. Frank Cardwell (1897)
- Mord Em'ly (1898)
- Outside The Radius. Stories of a London suburb (1899)
- A Son of the State (1899) Online
- A Breaker of Laws (1900) Online
- London Only. A Set Of Common Occurrences (1901)
- Lost Property (1902) Online
- Up Side Streets – Short Stories (1903)
- Erb (1903)
- George And The General (1904)
- Next Door Neighbours (1904) Online
- Mrs Galer's Business (1905) Online
- On Company's Service (1905)
- The Wickhamses (1906)
- Name of Garland (1907) Online
- Nearly Five Million (1907)
- Speaking Rather Seriously (1908)
- Sixty Nine Birnam Road (1908)
- Thomas Henry (1909)
- Table d'Hôte. Tales (1910)
- Splendid Brother (1910)
- From Nine to Six-Thirty (1910)
- Light Refreshment (1911)
- Thanks to Sanderson (1911)
- Love at Paddington (1912) Online
- Devoted Sparkes (1912)
- The Remington Sentence (1913)
- Mixed Grill (1913) Online
- The Happy Recruit (1914)
- The Kennedy People (1915)
- Book Here – Short Stories (1915)
- Stray Thoughts from W. Pett Ridge (1916)
- On Toast (1916)
- Madam Prince (1916)
- The Amazing Years (1917) Online
- Special Performance (1918)
- Top Speed (1918)
- Well-To-Do-Arthur (1920)
- Just Open. Short Stories (1920)
- Bannerton's Agency (1921)
- Richard Triumphant (1922)
- Lunch Basket – Tales (1923)
- Miss Mannering (1923)
- Rare Luck (1924)
- Leaps And Bounds (1924)
- A Story Teller – Forty Years In London (1923)
- Just Like Aunt Bertha (1925)
- I Like To Remember (1925)
- Our Mr Willis (1926)
- London Types Taken From Life (1926)
- Easy Distances (1927)
- Hayward's Fight (1927)
- The Two Mackenzies (1928)
- The Slippery Ladder (1929)
- Affectionate Regards (1929)
- Eldest Miss Collingwood (1930)
- Led by Westmacott (1931)

William Pett Ridge also wrote a play titled "Four small plays"; one of the originals is in the ownership of direct descendants of his.
