= Rudolf Brinkmann (baritone) =

German opera singer

Rudolf Brinkmann (29 December 1873 – 3 November 1927) was a German operatic baritone.

== Life ==
Brinkmann was born in Elberfeld (today a district of Wuppertal), the son of a pastry shop owner. At the age of 16, he began his training at the Cologne Opera and Drama School with Paul Hoppe. After he was also taught by him in Hamburg, he went to Heilbronn in 1895 and then to the German Opera in Amsterdam, which soon disbanded. In 1897, he was engaged at the Oper Frankfurt and worked there until his early death in 1927. Allegedly, he sang an almost unbelievable number of parts (between 300 and 500).

Brinkmann, who was attached to the ideas of Freemasonry, was married with the opera soubrette Minnie Rau. He died at the age of 54 in Frankfurt.
