= Richard Breitenfeld =

German baritone

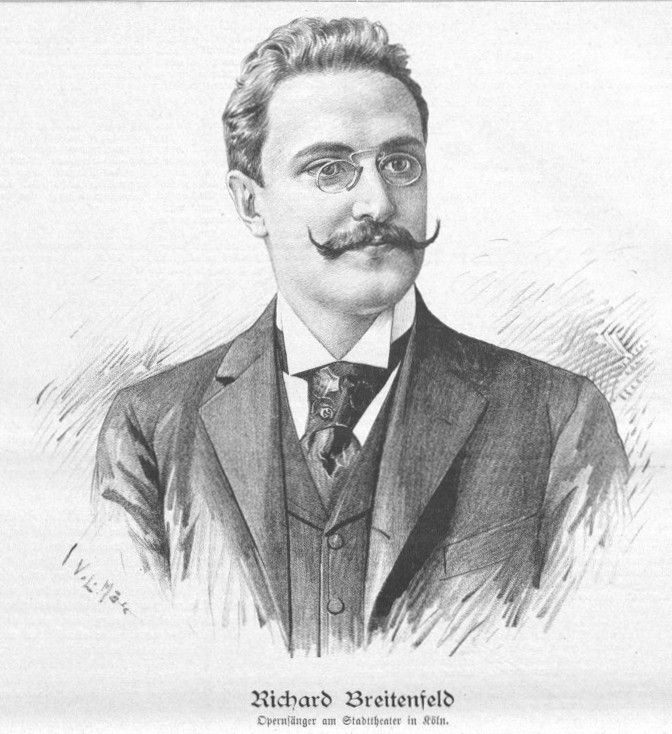
Richard Breitenfeld in 1897

Richard Breitenfeld (13 October 1869 – 16 December 1944) was a German baritone. He was a member of the Frankfurt Opera ensemble and was murdered in the Theresienstadt concentration camp.

Breitenfeld was born in Reichenberg, Austro-Hungarian Empire (now in the Czech Republic) and made his debut in 1897 as Count Luna in Verdi's Il trovatore in Cologne. In 1912, he sang the role of the count in Act II of Franz Schreker's Der ferne Klang in its world premiere at the Frankfurt Opera. The contralto Magda Spiegel, also of the Frankfurt Opera, was murdered in Auschwitz. According to Peter Hugh Reed writing in American Record Guide (1949), Breitenfeld recorded for Odeon and His Master's Voice between 1910 and 1914.

Richard Breitenfeld has a memorial stone in Frankfurt.
