= Blühen =

2023 opera by Vito Žuraj

- Opera by Vito Žuraj
- Translation: Blossoming
- Librettist: Händl Klaus
- Language: German; English
- Based on: Thomas Mann's Die Betrogene
- Premiere: 22 January 2023; Oper Frankfurt

Blühen (Blossoming) is an opera after the short story Die Betrogene by Thomas Mann, with music by Vito Žuraj. The libretto was written by Händl Klaus. Commissioned by the Oper Frankfurt, the opera was first performed there on 22 January 2023, directed by Brigitte Fassbaender and conducted by Michael Wendeberg.

== History ==
Mann completed Die Betrogene, his last short story, in 1953. It was translated as The Black Swan. Händl Klaus wrote the libretto, commissioned by the Oper Frankfurt. He converted Mann's prose to dialogues in concise language, in seven scenes.

The opera was first performed in Frankfurt on 22 January 2023, directed by Brigitte Fassbaender in a stage design by Martina Segna with costumes by Anna-Sophie Lienbacher. Michael Wendeberg conducted the Ensemble Modern and a vocal ensemble of 12 soloists.

== Roles ==
Roles, voice types, premiere cast
Roles	Voice type	Premiere, 22 November 2023
Aurelia von Tümmler	mezzo-soprano	Bianca Andrew
Anna (her daughter)	soprano	Nika Gorič
Edgar (her son)	baritone	Jarrett Porter
Ken	tenor	Michael Porter
Dr. Muthesius	bass	Alfred Reiter
