= Bianca Andrew =

New Zealand operatic mezzo-soprano

- Born: 1989 (age 36–37); Wellington, New Zealand
- Education: New Zealand School of Music; Guildhall School of Music and Drama
- Occupation: Operatic mezzo-soprano
- Organization: Oper Frankfurt
- Website: www.biancaandrew.com/bio

Bianca Andrew is an operatic mezzo-soprano from New Zealand who has appeared in internationally, based at the Oper Frankfurt.

== Life and career ==
Andrew was born in Wellington. She attended Marsden School, graduating in 2007. She studied at the New Zealand School of Music with Margaret Medlyn, where she graduated in 2011 with distinction. She became an emerging artist at the New Zealand Opera in 2013. Supported by a grant from the Kiri Te Kanawa Foundation in 2014, she studied further at the Guildhall School of Music and Drama in London with Yvonne Kenny where she graduated with a master's degree in 2017. She won the Song Prize of the Kathleen Ferrier Awards at Wigmore Hall in 2016. Andrew appeared as Bernardo in Goldschmidt's Beatrice Cenci at the Bregenzer Festspiele, and as Flamel in Offenbach's Fantasio at the Garsington Opera.

Andrew became a member of the ensemble of the Oper Frankfurt, where her roles included a title role in Humperdinck's Hänsel und Gretel, as Cherubino in Mozart's Le nozze di Figaro, and Mercédès in Bizet's Carmen. In 2023, she created the leading role of Aurelia von Tümmler in the world premiere of Blühen, a chamber opera by Vito Žuraj based on a short story by Thomas Mann, molded into a libretto by Händl Klaus. It was given by Oper Frankfurt at the Bockenheimer Depot, directed by Brigitte Fassbaender.
