= Klaus Händl =

Austrian actor, writer and director

Händl Klaus
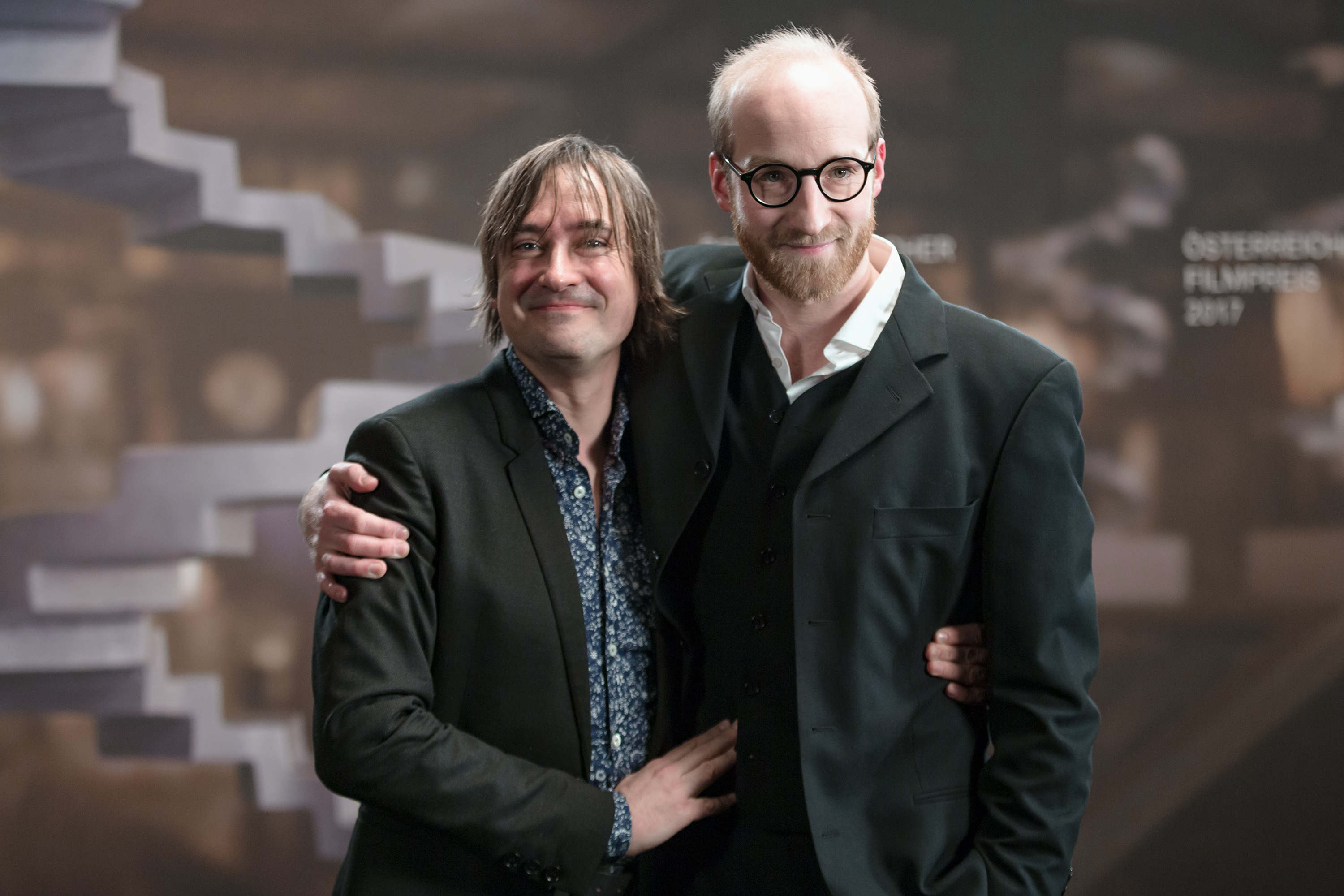
- Klaus Händl (left) and Lukas Turtur
- Born: Klaus Händl; 17 September 1969 (age 56); Rum, Austria
- Occupations: Actor, writer, director

Klaus Händl (born 17 September 1969) is an Austrian actor, writer and director.

== Biography ==
Händl was born in Rum, Tyrol, Austria. He started his theater career as an actor in Vienna's Schauspielhaus. His first theatrical production, which he also directed, was premiered in the Styrian autumn festival Steirischer Herbst at Graz. He has also appeared in several films.

As a director, he made the feature films März in 2008, and Tomcat in 2016, both of which were credited to Händl Klaus. He is a theater and film professor at the University of Applied Arts Vienna. He lives in Vienna, Berlin, and in Port am Bielersee, Switzerland.

His work as a writer includes collaborations as a librettist with composers such as Georg Friedrich Haas, Heinz Holliger, Hèctor Parra, and Vito Žuraj.

== Works ==
- 1994: Legenden. 35 Prosastücke. Droschl Literaturverlag Graz
- 1995: Satz Bäurin. Klagenfurter Texte. Piper Verlag
- 1996: Kleine Vogelkunde. Radio play. ORF
- 2001: Ich ersehne die Alpen; So entstehen die Seen. Play. Rowohlt Verlag
- 2002: Häftling von Mab. Libretto; music: Eduard Demetz, Theater of Tyrol
- 2006: Dunkel lockende Welt. Play. Kammerspiele of Munich, Theater Biel-Solothurn in Switzerland, Burgtheater of Vienna. Rowohlt Verlag
- 2006: Vom Mond. Libretto. State Theater of Tyrol
- 2006: Stücke. Theater plays. Droschl Literaturverlag Graz
- 2007: Wilde – Der Mann mit den traurigen Augen. Theater Basel Kleine Bühne
- 2008: Dunkel lockende Welt. State Theater of Tyrol
- 2008: März. Feature film
- 2011: Bluthaus. Opera libretto, music by Georg Friedrich Haas. Premiere at the Schwetzingen Festival 2011.
- 2016: Tomcat (Kater). Feature film
- 2016: Koma. Opera libretto, music by Georg Friedrich Haas. Premiere at the Schwetzingen Festival 2016
- 2017: Der Mieter. Opera libretto, music by Arnulf Herrmann. Premiere at the Oper Frankfurt on 12 November 2017.
- 2018: Lunea. Opera libretto, music by Heinz Holliger. Premiere at the Opernhaus Zürich on 4 March 2018.
- 2019: Les Bienveillantes. Opera libretto, after the novel of the same name by Jonathan Littell, music by Hèctor Parra. Premiere at the Opera Vlaanderen on 24 April 2019.
- 2023: Blühen. Opera libretto, after The Black Swan by Thomas Mann, music by Vito Žuraj. Premiere at the Oper Frankfurt on 22 January 2023.
- 2024: Liebesgesang. Opera libretto, music by Georg Friedrich Haas. Premiere at Stadtheater Bern on 31 May 2024.

== Awards ==
In 1996 Händl Klaus received an award for the Radio Play of the Year from the Austrian Broadcasting Service ORF. Other awards include the Rauriser Literaturpreis (Austria) and the Robert-Walser-Preis (Germany).

- 1995: Robert-Walser-Preis, Rauris Literature Prize
- 1996: ORF-Hörspielpreis "Radio Play of the Year"
- 2002: Subsidy of the Literarisches Colloquium Berlin
- 2002: Hermann-Lenz-Stipendium (subsidy)
- 2004: Nestroy Theatre Prize nomination as best young playwright
- 2005: Theater prize of the Cultural Circle of the German Economy
- 2006: Playwright of the Year by the magazine Theater heute ("Theater Today")
- 2007: Literature subsidies of Tyrol, Welti Dramatikerpreis of the city of Bern for playwrights, Feldkircher Lyrikpreis
- 2008: Silver Leopard for the best debut feature at the Locarno International Film Festival, for the movie März
- 2008: Culture Award of the city of Biel
- 2008: Special Award of the Jury at the Sarajevo Film Festival for the movie März
- 2008: Berner Filmpreis for the movie März
- 2016: Teddy Award for the movie Tomcat (Kater)
