= Hèctor Parra =

Spanish composer

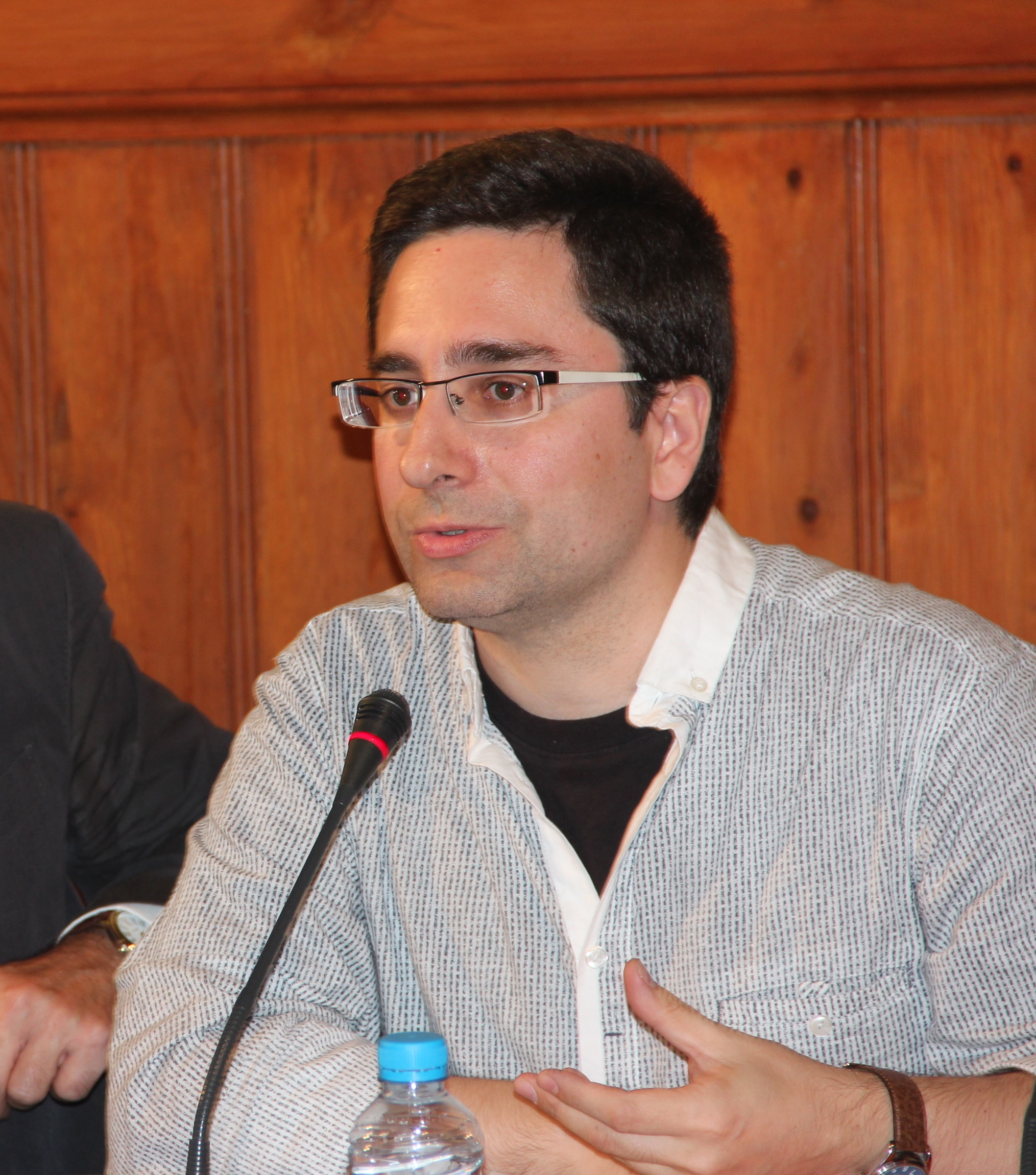
Hèctor Parra

Hèctor Parra i Esteve (born 17 April 1976) is a Spanish composer. Since 2002 he has lived in Paris.

== Life ==
Born in Barcelona, Parra completed his studies with Carles Guivoart, David Padrós and Maria Jesús Crespo at the Municipal Conservatory of Barcelona with an award in composition and a distinction in piano. After also graduating in choral conducting, he studied orchestra conducting with Arturo Tamayo at the University of Alcalá. He continued his composition studies with Michael Jarrell at the Geneva University of Music in 2005–2006, and with Jonathan Harvey, Brian Ferneyhough, Beat Furrer and Philippe Manoury at IRCAM, Royaumont foundation academy, Centre Acanthes (France) and Takefu (Japan). He was selected for studying composition and computer music at IRCAM (2002–2003) with Mikhail Malt and Philippe Leroux. He earned a master's degree in Sciences and Technology of Art from the Paris 8 University Vincennes-Saint-Denis under the supervision of Horacio Vaggione in 2005. Beside music, he studied painting and drawing at Francesco Miñarro's studio in Barcelona. Between 2005 and 2012 he was a professor of Electroacoustic composition at the Conservatory of Music of Aragon between 2013 and 2017 he was composition professor at IRCAM. He has also been member of several juries in international competitions such as Concours international de piano d'Orléans 2017 and Geneva International Music Competition 2019.

His works have been performed internationally by ensembles like Ensemble Intercontemporain, the Arditti Quartet, ensemble recherche, musikfabrik, Klangforum Wien, Freiburger Barockorchester, Concerto Köln, SWR Symphonieorchester, Gürzenich Orchestra Cologne, BBC Scottish Symphony Orchestra, Tokyo Philharmonic Orchestra, Orquesta Nacional de España, Barcelona Symphony Orchestra and National Orchestra of Catalonia, the Orchestre Philharmonique de Liège, Orchestre national d'Île-de-France, Kammerensemble Neue Musik Berlin, Uusinta Ensemble, and the ensemble mosaik as well as many soloists.

He has received commissions from the French state, from the IRCAM-Centre Pompidou on seven occasions, from the Spanish ministry of culture, from the government of Catalonia, from the City Council of Munich for the Munich Biennale and from institutions such as Academy of Arts, Berlin, Musée du Louvre, WDR, SWR, Kölner Philharmonie, Auditori de Barcelona, Ensemble Intercontemporain, Klangforum Wien/Impuls academy Graz, Strasbourg Music Festival, Orchestre national d'Île-de-France, IVM (Valencia), Musica de Hoy (Xavier Güell), Schauspielhaus Salzburg, Caja Madrid or the Selmer Society (Paris).

His music was performed at international festivals such as Lucerne Festival, Avignon Festival, Agora Festival of IRCAM (Paris), Royaumont, Centre Acanthes, Forum Neues Musiktheater of the Stuttgart Opera House, Novart de Bordeaux, ADK Berlin, Quincena Musical de San Sebastián, Nous Sons Barcelona, Muziekgebouw aan 't IJ (Amsterdam), Philharmonie Luxembourg, Warsaw Autumn, Wien Modern, Acht Brücken (Cologne), Donaueschingen Festival, Huddersfield Contemporary Music Festival (he was the resident composer in 2013), ISCM-World Music Days 2015, Wittener Tage für neue Kammermusik, Festival Présences de Radio France, Manifesto of IRCAM-Center Pompidou, Musikprotokoll / Steirischer Herbst, KLANG (Helsinki), Traiettorie Parma, Ars Musica (Brussels), Festival Archipel (Geneva), Granada International Festival, Quincena Musical de San Sebastián or the Rainy Days Festival.

His pieces were part of programs in concert halls such as the Philharmonie de Paris, the Konzerthaus, Vienna, the Suntory Hall Tokyo, the Auditorio Nacional de Música Madrid, the L'Auditori Barcelona, Wigmore Hall, Palau de la Música Catalana (invited composer in 2015 and 2016), Nouveau Siècle Lille (where he was resident composer in 2017 and 2018) and opera houses such as Opera Vlaanderen, Berlin State Opera, the Theater Freiburg, Staatsoper Stuttgart and the Gran Teatre del Liceu.

Parra's works are published by Durand/Universal Music Publishing Classical (Paris) and by Tritó Edicions (Barcelona) (works until 2010).

== Major influences and style ==
Three major fields of inspiration can be observed in Parra's work:

- Fine art, especially painting.
- Natural sciences, especially particle physics, astronomy, astrophysics and evolutionary biology.
- Literature, especially novels and plays from contemporary European writers with a critical and political view on society and history.

=== Fine art ===
Parra is a trained painter himself. His opulent handwritten scores show his graphic skills. His fascination for texture and color gradient, especially in the works of El Greco, Diego Velázquez and Paul Cézanne, led him to compositional strategies of transforming visual textures and their proportional relations into dynamic musical forms. Exemplary pieces for such transitions are Lumières Abyssales – Chroma I and Aracne – String Quartet No. 3. Also Joan Miró was a major inspiration (Constellations, L'Étoile matinale and Chiffres et constellations amoureux d'une femme). But his interest also includes more contemporary artists such as sculptor Jaume Plensa (who contributed in the making of the choir piece Breathing with a piece of poetry), Matthew Ritchie (who Parra worked with for Hypermusic Prologue and Hypermusic Ascension, exhibited in New York's Guggenheim Museum), Antoni Tàpies (Cos de matèria), Gordon Matta-Clark or Gregor Schneider (Haus u r / Office Baroque, Wilde).

=== Natural sciences ===
In 2006, theoretical physics, astronomy and evolutionary biology became a source of inspiration for Parra. He transferred theories from theoretical physicist Lisa Randall, astrophysicist Jean-Pierre Luminet or organic chemist and molecular biologist Graham Cairns-Smith into musical processes, leading him to small chamber pieces, orchestra pieces and eventually also to his opera Hypermusic Prologue based on a libretto by Lisa Randall. Further exemplary pieces referring to such theories are: Inscape, Early life, Stress Tensor, Mineral Life, Caressant l'horizon, InFALL, or ...limite les rêves au-delà.

=== Literature ===
Around 2013 literature become a new major source of inspiration and material for Parra. Several operas, adapting novels or plays into libretti, have been created since. The opera Das geopferte Leben with a libretto by Marie NDiaye was premiered by the Freiburger Barockorchester and the ensemble recherche at the Munich Biennale in 2014. In the succeeding year the opera Wilde was premiered at the Schwetzingen Festival, with Calixto Bieito as director and a libretto by Klaus Händl.

Parra's hitherto most ambitious project is the opera Les Bienveillantes, based on Jonathan Littell’s homonymous novel. Again with Calixto Bieito as director and a libretto by Klaus Händl. The opera was commissioned by the Vlaanderen Opera and premiered in Antwerpen and Gent in April and May 2019 and was extensively applauded by the public and praised by the international press.

== Works ==
=== Stage works ===
- Zangezi (2007). Musical theatre for soprano, actors and pre-recorded electronics. Based on Velimir Khlebnikov’s homonymous poem.
- Hypermusic Prologue – A projective opera in seven planes. (2008/2009). Opera for two soloist vocals, ensemble and live electronics. Libretto by Lisa Randall.
- Te craindre en ton absence (2012/2013). Monodrama for a single actress, ensemble and live electronics. Libretto by Marie NDiaye.
- Das geopferte Leben (2013). Opera for four soloist vocals, baroque ensemble and live electronics. Libretto by Marie NDiaye.
- Wilde (2014/2015). Opera for six soloist vocals and orchestra. Libretto by Klaus Händl.
- Les Bienveillantes (2018/2019). Opera for soloist vocals, quartet vocal, choir and large orchestra. Libretto by Klaus Händl based on Jonathan Littell’s homonymous novel.
- Orgia (2022/2023). Opera for three soloists and orchestra. Libretto by Calixto Bieito based on Pier Paolo Pasolini's homonymous theatre piece.
- Justice (2023). Opera concertante for soprano, masculin actor, large orchestra and electronic device. Libretto by Klaus Händl.

=== Orchestra ===
- Lumières Abyssales – Chroma I (2004/2006). Large orchestra.
- Karst – Chroma II (2006). Large orchestra.
- Chamber Symphony No. 2 "Fibrillian" (2007/2008). String orchestra.
- Caressant l’horizon (2011). Chamber orchestra.
- InFALL (2011/rev. 2012). Large orchestra.
- L’absència (2013). Orchestra.
- Wilde Suite (2015). Orchestra.
- Three Shakespeare Sonnets (2016). Tenor and orchestra.
- Orgia – Irrisorio alito d’aria (2017). Ensemble and baroque orchestra.
- Avant la fin... vers où? (2017). Large orchestra.
- Inscape (2017/2018). Instrumental soloist's ensemble, large orchestra and live electronics.
- Wanderwelle (2019). Baritone and large orchestra. Libretto by Klaus Händl.
- Ich ersehne die Alpen (2022). For soprano, electronic device and large orchestra. Monodrame on a text by Klaus Händl.
- JUSTICE suite (2023/2024). For soprano and large orchestra. Libretto de Fiston Mwanza Mujila after a scenario from Milo Rau.
- Deux constellations pour orchestre d'après Joan Miró (2024).
- Trois constellations pour orchestre d'après Joan Miró (2025).

=== Instrumental ensemble ===
- Chamber Symphony – Quasikristall (2005). Large ensemble.
- Sirrt die Sekunde (2008). Large ensemble.
- Equinox (2010). Large ensemble.
- Moins qu’un souffle, à peine un movement de l’air (2012). Flute soloist and ensemble.
- Un souffle en suspens (2016). Large ensemble.
- La mort i la primavera (2021).
- Le passage de l'oiseau divin - Fanfare pour cuivres d'après la constellation XXIII de Joan Miró (2024).
- Tryptique Bleu. Concerto pour trompette, grand ensemble et électronique d'après l'oeuvre de Joan Miró (2024/2025).
- Chibola Mu Lumba (2025).

=== Chamber music ===
- Pulsions (2002). Chamber ensemble.
- Strata – Antigone II (2002). Chamber ensemble.
- Abîme – Antigone IV (2002). Chamber ensemble.
- Stasis – Antigone I (2002). Strings quartet.
- Andante Sospeso (2003). Flute and piano.
- Fragments Striés (2004). Saxophone quartet.
- Piano Trio No. 1 "Wortschatten" (2004)
- Vestigios (2005). Two pianos and percussion.
- Ciel Rouillé (2005). Chamber ensemble.
- Ona (2006). Flute and viola.
- String Trio (2006). String trio and electronica.
- String Quartet "Leaves of Reality" (2007)
- Piano Trio No. 1 "Knotted Fields" (2007)
- An exploration of light (2008). Violoncello and percussion.
- String Quartet No. 2 "Fragments on Fragility" (2009). String quartet and live electronics.
- Stress Tensor (2009 rev. 2011). Chamber ensemble.
- Early Life (2010). Chamber ensemble.
- Vers le blanc (2013). Violin and piano.
- Sigma-Waves (2015). Saxophone quartet.
- Catalunya Lliure (2015). Chamber ensemble.
- String Quartet No. 3 "Aracne" (2015)
- Cell 2 (2016). Chamber ensemble.
- String Quartet No. 4 "Un concertino di angeli contro le pareti del mio cranio" (2020).
- L’Étoile matinale (2020). Chamber ensemble.
- Chiffres et constellations amoureux d’une femme (2020/2021). Chamber ensemble.
- Cinq constellations pour piano a quatre mains (2020/2021).
- Constellations (2020/2021). Actor and four hands piano.

=== Solo music ===
- Tres Peces per a piano – Lichtzwang (1999). Piano.
- Time Fields II (2002/rev.2006). Baritone saxophone.
- Time Fields II (2004). Clarinet in B minor.
- Time Fields III (2004). Flute.
- Chymisch (2005). Baritone saxophone and electronica.
- Impromptu (2005). Piano.
- L'Aube Assaillie (2004–2005). Violoncello and electronica.
- Tentatives de Réalité (2007). Violoncello and live electronics.
- Quatre miniatures (2007). Piano.
- La dona d’aigua (El Montseny) (2009). Piano.
- Piano Sonata (2010). Piano.
- Mineral Life (2010). Multipercussion.
- Cos de matèria (Antoni Tàpies in memoriam) (2012) / Cinq études d'art, No. 1. Piano.
- Carícies cap al blanc (2013) / Cinq études d'art, No. 2. Piano.
- Haus u r / Office Baroque (2014) / Cinq études d'art, No. 3. Piano.
- Una pregunta (to Jaume Plensa) (2015) / Cinq études d'art, No. 5. Piano.
- Tres miradas (2016). Organ.
- Cell (Arch of Hysteria) (2016) / Cinq études d’art, No. 4. Piano.
- Mineral life II (2016). Viola.
- Au cœur de l'Oblique / Cinq études d'architecture, No. 1 (2016–2017). Piano.
- ...limite les rêves au-delà (2017). Violoncello and live electronics.
- Quatre constellations pour piano (2020).
- Cinq fleurs pour contrebasse (2021).

=== Vocal music ===
- Pape moe (1999–2000). Soprano and electronica. Text by Paul Gauguin (Noa Noa).
- Mort d’Antigone – Antigone III (2001). Mezzo-soprano and clarinet in B minor. Text by Sophocles.
- Strette (2003). Soprano and live electronics. Poem by Paul Celan.
- Arena (2006). Soprano and piano. Poem by Núria Casellas.
- Stimmen (2008). Soprano, violin and piano. Poem by Paul Celan.
- Breathing (2015). Mixed choir in 12 voices. Poems by Jaume Plensa.
- Lent comme un rêve (2015). Chamber choir and piano. Poem by Jaume Plensa.
- Three Shakespeare Sonnets (2016). Version for ténor and piano. Sonnets 18, 19 and 20 by William Shakespeare.
- Wanderwelle (2019). For bariton and piano. Text from Klaus Händl after the 'Cahiers de conversation de Beethoven'.
- Ich ersehne die Alpen (2022). Monodrama for soprano and piano. Text from Klaus Händl.
- L'illa dels Iliris vermells, primer quadern (2024). Five songs for tenor/soprano and piano. After poems by Mercè Rodoreda.

=== Semi-improvised music ===
- Life After Architecture – Love (2019). Piano for four hands.
- FREC 3 (2016–2017). Piano and three instruments.
- FREC 2 (2016). Piano and live electronics.
- FREC 1 (2012–2013). Amplified piano.

=== Electroacoustic music ===
- Lumières Abyssales (2002).
- Glottal (2004).
- I have come like a butterfly into the hall of human life (2009). 6 tracks.

== Awards and nominations ==
- 2002: Composition Prize from the Colegio de España de París and the National Institute of Music of Spain-INAEM
- 2005: Prize of the Tremplin Reading Committee of IRCAM and the Ensemble Intercontemporain
- 2007: The Earplay Donald Aird Memorial Composers Competition in San Francisco
- 2008: Prize of the Impuls Reading Committee of Klangforum Wien (Graz)
- 2009: "Tendències al creador emergent" award by the Spanish newspaper El Mundo
- 2011: Ernst von Siemens Composer Prize
- 2014: Nomination from Opernwelt magazine for Das geopferte Leben as best premiere of the year
- 2015: Selected by the ISCM – International Society for Contemporary Music to close the Annual Festival 2015 (Slovenia) with the orchestral work InFALL
- 2017: National Culture Prize of Catalonia
- 2018: Finalist in FEDORA – Generali Opera Prize
- 2021: Residency at the Villa Médicis in Rome / Académie de France à Rome (2021–2022).

== Recordings ==
- L'aube assaillie. Musique de chambre : Ciel Rouillé; Time Fields III; Andante Sospeso; Impromptu; Fragments Striés; Tres Peces per a piano – Lichtzwang; Vestigios; L’Aube Assaillie, Ensemble Proxima Centauri, Utopia Ensemble, Quatuor Aker, Duo Nataraya, Imma Santacreu, Laura Capsir, Amandine Lefèvre and Hèctor Parra. Producers : REMA 12 / Albert Mestres, 1 CD Ars Harmonica, Sabadell, 2006.
- Piano Trio No. 2 "Knotted Fields"; Impromptu; Piano Trio No. 1 "Wortschatten"; L’Aube assaillie; Abîme – Antigone IV; String Trio, Ensemble Recherche, 1 CD Kairos (record label), 2008, no. 0012822KAI.
- Hypermusic Prologue. A projective opera in seven planes. Libretto by Lisa Randall, Charlotte Ellett (soprano), James Bobby (baritone), Ensemble Intercontemporain, Clement Power (director), Thomas Goepfer (IRCAM’S music computing), 2 CDs Kairos (record label), col. Sirènes, coproduction Ircam-Centre Pompidou, Ensemble Intercontemporain, 2010.
- Early Life; Stress Tensor; Caressant l’Horizon, ensemble recherche, Ensemble Intercontemporain, Emilio Pomárico, 1 CD Col legno, 2012.
- Frec. Agustí Fernández, piano, 1 CD Sirulita, 2020.

== Writings ==
- Parra, Hèctor (2019). "From Creative Energy to the Conformation of a Sculptural Space-time: Musical Tension in the Work of Jaume Plensa." Catalogue Jaume Plensa. Barcelona: MACBA.
- —. "Compondre avui. Reflexions des de la praxi." Revista Segell, no. 33, Barcelona.
- —. "Das geopferte Leben: ein Zwiegespräch zwischen Barock und gegenwärtigem Schaffen." The Freiburger Barockorchester GbR's 30th anniversary book. Translated into German by Judith Blank.
- — (2016). "David padrós, in memoriam." Núvol. Barcelona.
- — (2008). "Hypermusic Prologue – Òpera Projectiva en 7 plans." En ressonància.
- — (2013). "Encontre noves fronteres de la ciencia, l’art i el pensament", KRTU, Catalonia's Ministry of Culture. Article published in English in Sonograma.
- — (2007). "Cap a una nova expressivitat". Nexus, vol. 37. Barcelona: Caixa Catalunya.
- — (2006). "Strette". In: Bresson, Jean, Carlos Agon and Gérard Assayag (eds.). The OM Composer's Book 1. Paris: IRCAM-Centre Pompidou.
- —. Pour une approche créatrice des interrelations structurelles entre les espaces acoustiques et visuels. (Master's thesis). Lead Supervisor: Horacio Vaggione. Université de Paris VIII. Unpublished.
