= Lipovšek =

Lipovšek is a Slovenian surname that may refer to:

- Boštjan Lipovšek (born 1974), Slovenian horn player
- Marijan Lipovšek (1910–1995), Slovenian composer, pianist, and teacher
- Marjana Lipovšek (born 1946), Slovenian opera and concert singer
- Stanislav Lipovšek (born 1943), Slovenian Roman Catholic prelate
- Tomás Lipovšek Puches (born 1993), Slovenian-Argentine tennis player
