= The Kindly Ones (Littell novel) =

Book by Jonathan Littell

- Author: Jonathan Littell
- Original title: Les Bienveillantes
- Translator: Charlotte Mandell
- Language: French
- Genre: Novel, historical fiction
- Publisher: Éditions Gallimard (France); HarperCollins (U.S.)
- Publication date: September 13, 2006
- Publication place: France
- English publication date: March 3, 2009
- Media type: Print
- Pages: 902 pp (French); 992 pp (English)
- ISBN: 2-07-078097-X (French); ISBN 978-0-06-135345-1 (English)
- OCLC: 71274155
- LC Class: PQ3939.L58 B5 2006

The Kindly Ones (French: Les Bienveillantes) is a 2006 historical fiction novel written in French by American-born author Jonathan Littell. The book is narrated by its fictional protagonist Maximilien Aue, a former SS officer of French and German ancestry who was a Holocaust perpetrator and was present during several major events of World War II.

The 983-page book became a bestseller in France and was widely discussed in newspapers, magazines, academic journals, books and seminars. It was also awarded two of the most prestigious French literary awards, the Grand Prix du roman de l'Académie française and the Prix Goncourt in 2006, and has been translated into several languages.

== Background ==
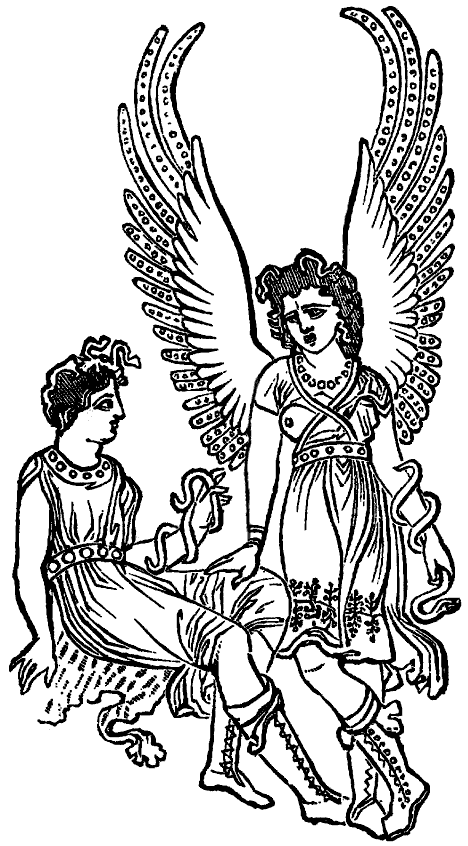
The image of two Erinyes taken from an ancient vase

The title Les Bienveillantes ([le bjɛ̃.vɛ.jɑ̃t]; The Kindly Ones) refers to the trilogy of ancient Greek tragedies The Oresteia written by Aeschylus. The Erinyes or Furies were vengeful goddesses who tracked and tormented those who murdered a parent. In the plays, Orestes, who has killed his mother Clytemnestra to avenge his father Agamemnon, was pursued by these goddesses. The goddess Athena intervenes, setting up a jury trial to judge the Furies' case against Orestes. Athena casts the deciding vote which acquits Orestes, then pleads with the Furies to accept the trial's verdict and to transform themselves into "most loved of gods, with me to show and share fair mercy, gratitude and grace as fair." The Furies accept and are renamed the Eumenides or Kindly Ones (in French Les Bienveillantes).

Andrew Nurnberg, Littell's literary agent, said that a possible one-line description of the novel would be: "The intimate memoirs of an ex-Nazi mass murderer." When asked why he wrote such a book, Littell invokes a photo he discovered in 1989 of Zoya Kosmodemyanskaya, a female Soviet partisan hanged by the Nazis in 1941. He adds that a bit later, in 1992, he watched the movie Shoah by Claude Lanzmann, which left an impression on him, especially the discussion by Raul Hilberg about the bureaucratic aspect of genocide.

In 2001, Littell decided to quit his job at Action Against Hunger and started research which lasted 18 months, during which he went to Germany, Ukraine, Russia and Poland, and read around 200 books, mainly about Nazi Germany, the Eastern Front, the Nuremberg Trials, and the genocide process. In addition, the author studied the literature and film archives of World War II and the post-war trials. Littell worked on this novel for about five years. This book is his first novel written in French and his second novel after the science fiction themed Bad Voltage in 1989.

Littell said he wanted to focus on the thinking of an executioner and of origins of state murder, showing how we can take decisions that lead, or not, to a genocide. Littell claims he set out creating the character Max Aue by imagining what he would have done and how he would have behaved if he had been born into Nazi Germany. One childhood event that kept Littell interested in the question of being a killer was the Vietnam War. According to him, his childhood terror was that he would be drafted, sent to Vietnam "and made to kill women and children who hadn't done anything to me."

Whereas the influence of Greek tragedies is clear from the choice of title, the absent father, and the roles of incest and parricide, Littell makes it clear that he was influenced by more than the structure of The Oresteia. He found that the idea of morality in Ancient Greece is more relevant for making judgments about responsibility for the Holocaust than the Judeo-Christian approach, wherein the idea of sin can be blurred by the concepts such as intentional sin, unintentional sin, sinning by thought, or sinning by deed. For the Greeks it was the commission of the act itself upon which one is judged: Oedipus is guilty of patricide, even if he did not know that he was killing his father.

== Plot ==
The book is a fictional autobiography, describing the life of Maximilien Aue, a former officer in the SS who, decades later, tells the story of a crucial part of his life when he was an active member of the security forces of the Third Reich. Aue begins his narrative as a member of an Einsatzgruppe in 1941, before being sent to the doomed German forces locked in the Battle of Stalingrad, which he survives. After a convalescence period in Berlin, and a visit to occupied France, he is designated for an advisory role for the concentration camps, and visits the extermination camps. He is ultimately present during the 1945 Battle of Berlin, the Nazi regime's last stand. By the end of the story, he flees Germany under a false French identity to start a new life in northern France. Throughout the account, Aue meets several famous Nazis, including Adolf Eichmann, Heinrich Himmler and Adolf Hitler. In the book, Aue accepts responsibility for his actions, but most of the time he feels more like an observer than a direct participant.

The book is divided into seven chapters, each named after a baroque dance, following the sequence of a Bach Suite. The narrative of each chapter is influenced by the rhythm of its associated dance.

« Toccata »: In this introduction, we are introduced to the narrator, and discover how he has ended up in France after the war. He is the director of a lace factory, has a wife, children, and grandchildren, though he has no real affection for his family and continues his homosexual encounters when he travels on business. He hints of an incestuous love, which we learn later was for his twin sister. He explains that he has decided to write about his experiences during the war for his own benefit and not as an attempt to justify himself. He closes the introduction by saying, "I live, I do what can be done, it's the same for everyone, I am a man like other men, I am a man like you. I tell you I am just like you!"

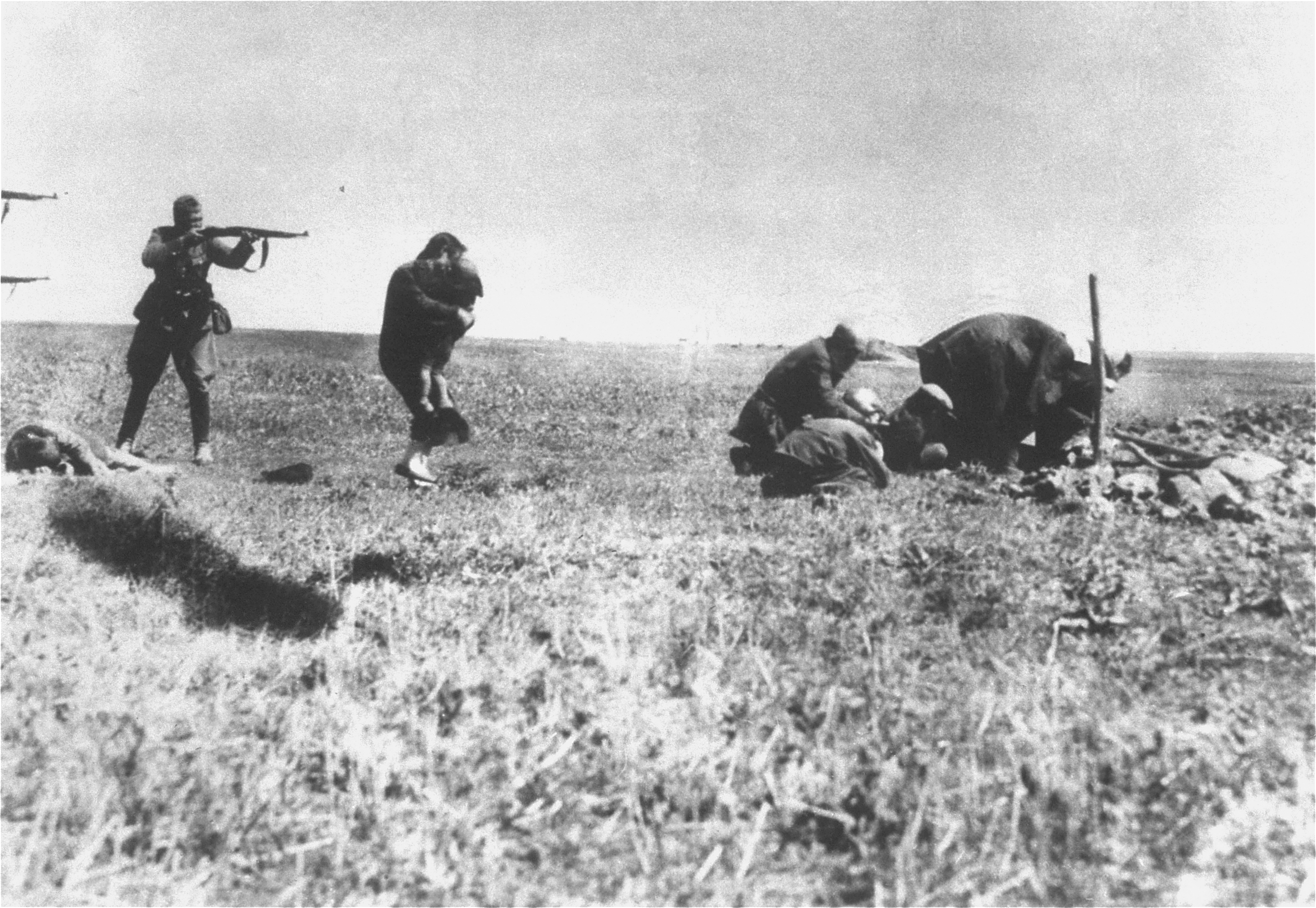
A photograph of Einsatzgruppen members executing Ukrainian Jews in 1942

« Allemande I & II »: Aue describes his service as an officer in one of the Einsatzgruppen extermination squads operating in Ukraine, as well as later in the Caucasus (a major theme is the racial classification, and thus fate, of the region's Mountain Jews). Aue's group is attached to the 6th Army in Ukraine, where he witnesses the Lviv pogroms and participates in the enormous massacre at Babi Yar. He describes in detail the killing of Soviet Jews, Communists, alleged partisans and other victims of the "special operations". Although he seems to become increasingly indifferent to the atrocities he is witnessing and sometimes taking part in, he begins to experience daily bouts of vomiting and suffers a mental breakdown. After taking sick leave, he is transferred to Otto Ohlendorf's Einsatzgruppe D only to encounter much hostility from his new SS colleagues, who openly spread rumours of his homosexuality. Aue is then charged with the assignment of proving to the Wehrmacht that the Mountain Jews were historically Jewish rather than later converts to Judaism. After he fails in this task, due to political pressure from the beleaguered Army, his disappointed commanding officer arranged that he be transferred to the doomed German forces at Stalingrad in late 1942.

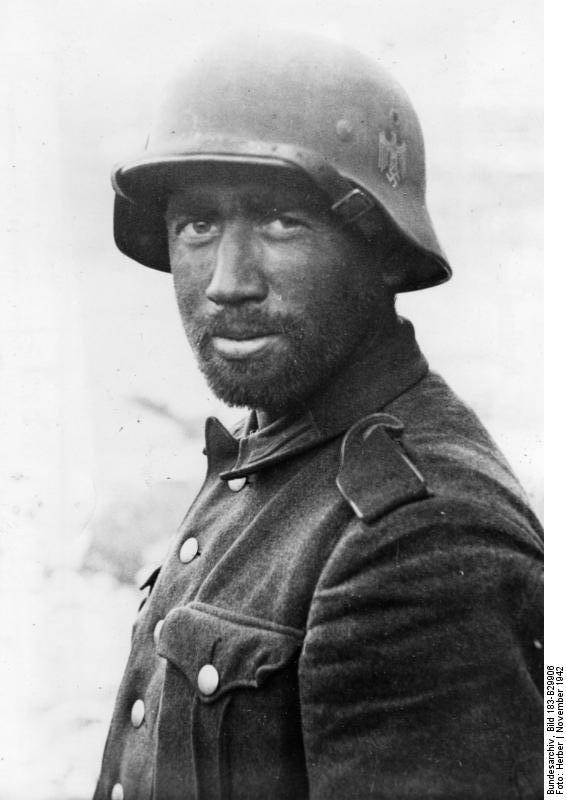
A German Army soldier during the Battle of Stalingrad in 1942

« Courante »: Aue thus takes part in the final phase of the struggle for Stalingrad. As with the massacres, he is mostly an observer, the narrator rather than the combatant. In the midst of the mayhem and starvation, he manages to have a discussion with a captured Soviet political commissar about the similarities between the Nazi and the Bolshevik world views, and once again is able to indicate his intellectual support for Nazi ideas. Aue gets shot in the head and seriously wounded, but is miraculously evacuated just before the German surrender in February 1943.

« Sarabande »: Convalescing in Berlin, Aue is awarded the Iron Cross 1st Class, by the SS chief Heinrich Himmler himself, for his duty at Stalingrad. While still on sick leave, he decides to visit his mother and stepfather in Antibes, in Italian-occupied France. Apparently, while he is in a deep sleep, his mother and stepfather are brutally murdered. Max flees from the house without notifying anybody and returns to Berlin.

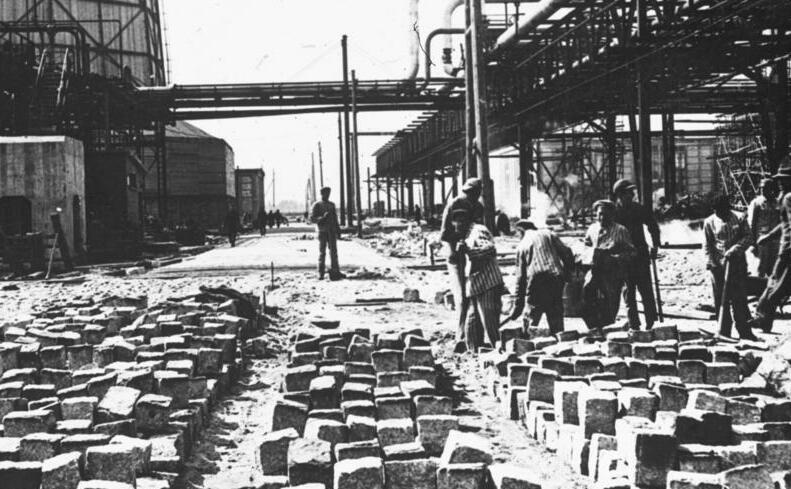
Prisoners at work at the Auschwitz III forced labor camp in Nazi occupied Poland

« Menuet en rondeaux »: Aue is transferred to Heinrich Himmler's personal staff, where he is assigned an at-large supervisory role for the concentration camps. He struggles to improve the living conditions of those prisoners selected to work in the factories as slave laborers, in order to improve their productivity. Aue meets Nazi bureaucrats organizing the implementation of the Final Solution (i.e., Eichmann, Oswald Pohl, and Rudolf Höß) and is given a glimpse of extermination camps (i.e., Auschwitz and Belzec); he also spends some time in Budapest, just when preparations are being made for transporting Hungarian Jews to Auschwitz. Aue witnesses the tug-of-war between those who are concerned with war production (Albert Speer) and those who are doggedly trying to implement the Final Solution. It is during this period that two police detectives from the Kripo, who are investigating the murders of his mother and stepfather, begin to visit him regularly. Like the Furies, they hound and torment him with their questions, which indicate their suspicions about his role in the crime.

« Air »: Max visits his sister and brother-in-law's empty house in Pomerania. There, he engages in a veritable autoerotic orgy particularly fueled by fantasy images of his twin sister. The two police officers follow his trail to the house, but he manages to hide from them. However, Aue soon finds himself trapped when the Red Army rapidly invades and occupies Pomerania.

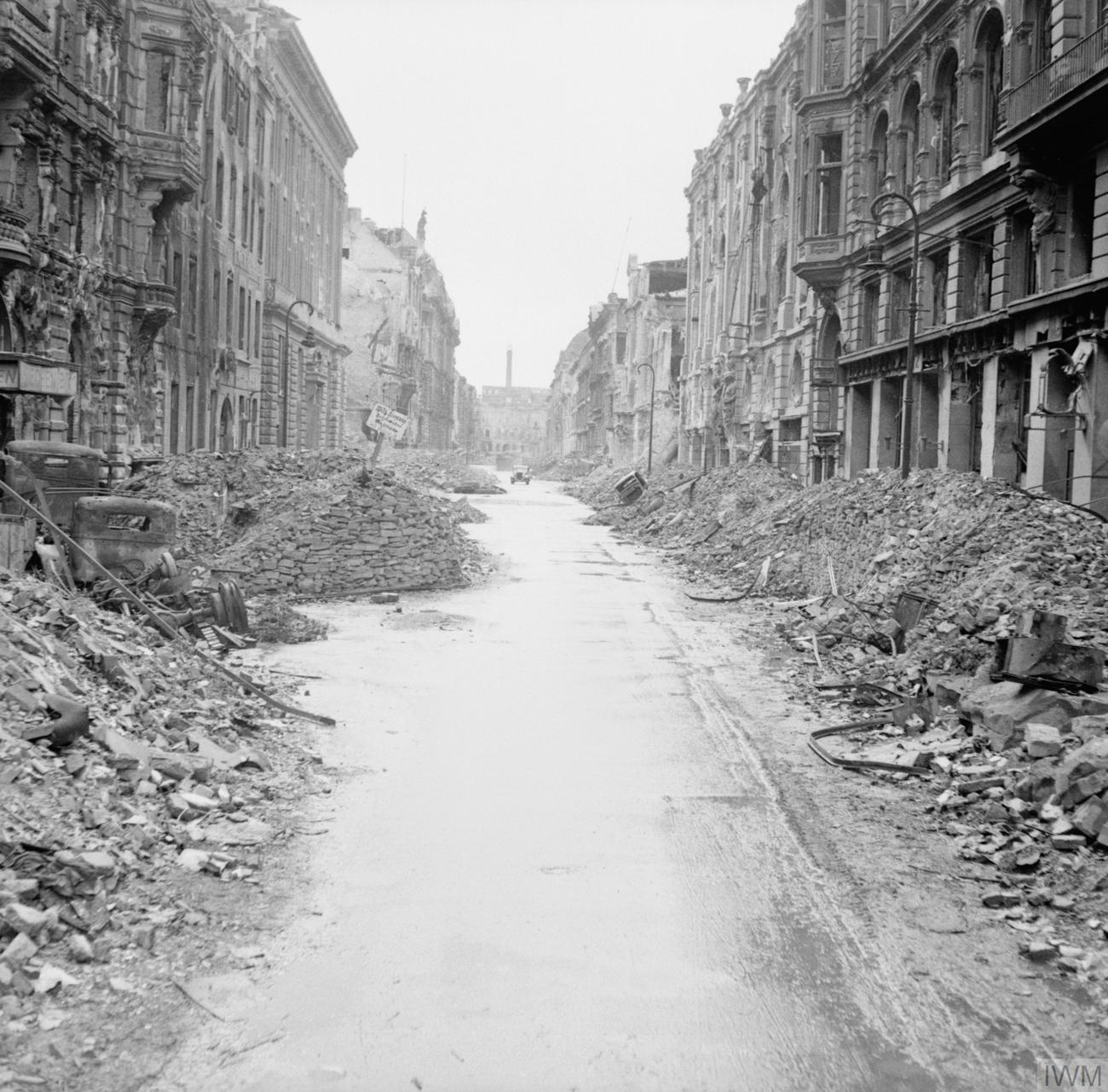
A street of Berlin in 1945

« Gigue »: Accompanied by his friend Thomas, who has come to rescue him, and escorted by a violent band of fanatical and half-feral orphaned German children, Max makes his way through the Soviet-occupied territory and across the front line. Arriving in Berlin, Max, Thomas, and many of their colleagues prepare for escape in the chaos of the last days of the Third Reich; Thomas' own plan is to impersonate a French laborer. Aue meets and is personally decorated by Hitler in the Führerbunker. During the decoration ceremony, Aue inexplicably bites the Führer's nose and is immediately arrested. When he is transported to his execution, the car is hit by an artillery shell, enabling him to escape. Aue flees through the Berlin U-Bahn subway tunnels, where he encounters his police pursuers again. Though their case has been repeatedly thrown out of court, the two detectives, unwilling to accept defeat, decided to track Aue down and execute him extrajudicially. Barely escaping when the Soviets storm the tunnels and kill one of the policemen, Aue wanders aimlessly in the ruined streets of war-torn Berlin before deciding to make a break for it. Making his way through the wasteland of the destroyed Berlin Zoo, he is yet again faced by the surviving policeman. Thomas shows up to kill the policeman, only to himself be killed by Aue, who steals from him the papers and uniform of a French STO conscripted worker.

The readers know from the beginning of the book that Aue's perfect mastery of the French language will allow him to slip away back to France with a new identity as a returning Frenchman. In the last paragraph of the novel, the narrator, after he ruthlessly killed his friend and protector, suddenly finds himself "alone with time and sadness": "The Kindly Ones were on to me." But in the end, all is not explicitly laid out for the reader; for Littell, in the words of one reviewer, "excels in the unsaid."

== Characters ==
=== Maximilien Aue ===
Maximilien Aue is a former officer of the SD, security and intelligence service of the SS; the book is written in the form of his memoirs. His mother was French (from Alsace), while his father, who left his mother and disappeared from their life in 1921, was German. Aue's mother remarried a Frenchman, Aristide Moreau, which Maximilien highly disapproved of. After a childhood in Germany and an adolescence in France, where he attends Sciences-Po, he later returns to Germany to study at the University of Berlin and the Kiel Institute for the World Economy. It is also during this period that he joins the SS, eventually rising to the rank of Obersturmbannführer. Aue is a cultured, highly educated, classical music-loving intellectual. He speaks many languages fluently – German, French, Ancient Greek and Latin – and holds a doctorate in law. Despite his French heritage and upbringing, he is, like his father, an ardent German nationalist. Even after the war, he is unrepentant of the crimes he committed in the name of National Socialism, "believing that it was my duty and that it had to be done, disagreeable or unpleasant as it may have been." He is extremely attracted to his twin sister Una, which led to an incestuous relationship with her when they were children, but ended when they entered puberty. Refusing to truly love any woman other than Una, he resorts to having sexual affairs with only men, while continuing to fantasize about his sister.

The character appears to be in part inspired by Léon Degrelle, a Belgian fascist leader, Nazi collaborator and Waffen-SS officer who was the subject of Littell's short book Le sec et l'humide: Une brève incursion en territoire fasciste ("The dry and wet: A brief foray into fascist territory"). A number of critics compared Aue's omnipresence in the world of the novel to that of Winston Groom's character Forrest Gump.

=== Aue's family ===
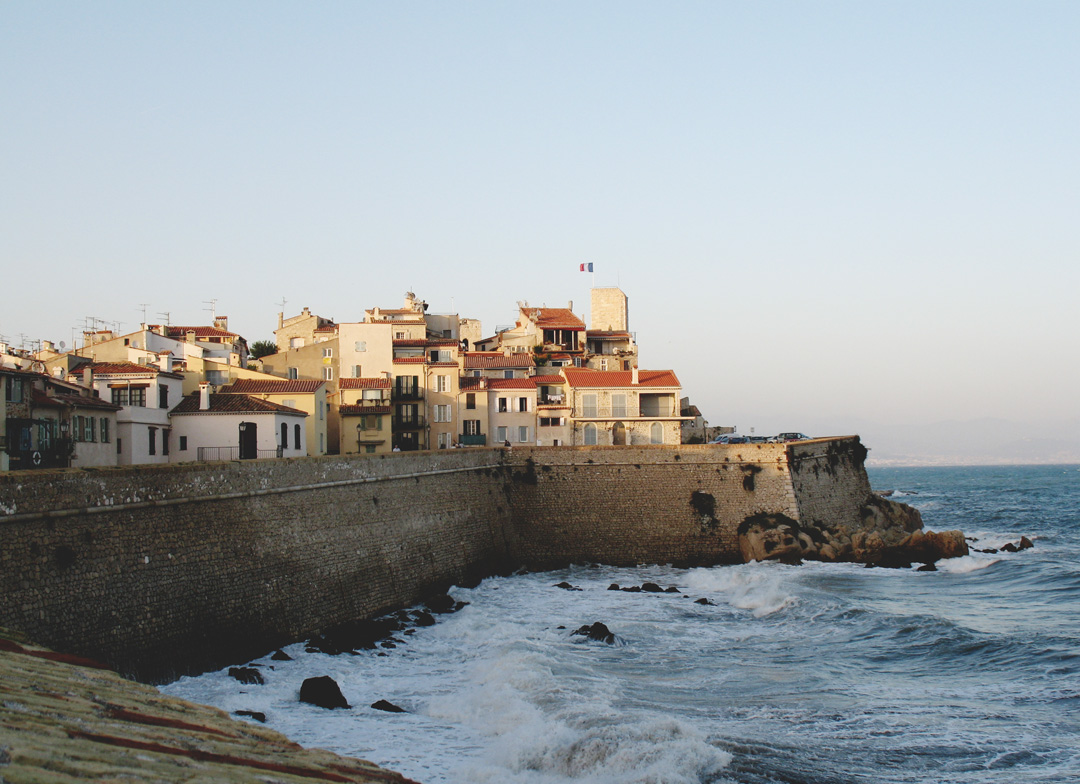
Aue's mother, stepfather and the twins lived in Antibes during the war

- Una Aue / Frau Von Üxküll – Una Aue is Maximilien's twin sister. She is married to the aristocrat Berndt von Üxküll, and although she appears only briefly in person, she dominates Aue's imagination, particularly his sexual fantasies and hallucinations. She lived with her husband on his estate in Pomerania, but apparently moved to Switzerland with him towards the end of the war. Like her husband, she is critical of Germany's National Socialist regime; this, along with Max's hatred of their mother and stepfather, and his attraction to her, led to her being estranged from Aue following the war.
- Berndt Von Üxküll – Von Üxküll is a paraplegic junker from Pomerania and a composer who is married to Una. A World War I veteran, he fought alongside Aue's father, whom he describes as a sadist, in the Freikorps. Despite essentially agreeing with their nationalist and antisemitic ideology, he distances himself from the Nazis. His name is possibly a reference to Nikolaus Graf von Üxküll-Gyllenband, an anti-Nazi resistant and uncle of Claus von Stauffenberg, a central figure in the failed plot to assassinate Hitler.
- Héloïse Aue (Héloïse Moreau) – Max's mother, who, believing her first husband to be dead, remarried Aristide Moreau. Max does not accept that his father is dead and never forgives his mother for remarrying. Héloïse also disapproves of Max's joining the Nazis, which further strains their relationship.
- Aristide Moreau – Max's stepfather, who is apparently connected to the French Resistance. Moreau is also the name of the "hero" from Gustave Flaubert's Sentimental Education, a book that Aue reads later in the novel. Aristide is reminiscent in French of Atrides, the name given to the descendants of Atreus, among whom figure Agamemnon, Orestes and Electra.
- The twins, Tristan and Orlando – Mysterious twin children who live with the Moreaus, but are most likely the offspring of the incestuous relationship between Aue and his sister. The epic poem Orlando Furioso is marked by the themes of love and madness, while the legend of Tristan and Iseult tells the story of an impossible love, two themes that can be found in The Kindly Ones.

=== Other fictional main characters ===
- Thomas Hauser – Thomas is Max's closest friend and the only person who appears in one capacity or another wherever he is posted. A highly educated, multilingual SS officer like Max, he is Aue's main source of information about bureaucratic Nazi politics. He helps Max in a number of ways, both in advancing his career as well as rescuing him from his sister's house in Pomerania. He saves Max's life at Stalingrad.
- Hélène Anders née Winnefeld – A young widow whom Aue meets through Thomas, while working in Berlin. When Max becomes seriously ill, she voluntarily comes to his apartment and nurses him back to health. While she is attracted to him, as he initially expresses interest in her, due to his feelings for his sister, as well as his homosexual tendencies, he coldly turns her down and away. She leaves Berlin for her parents' house and writes, asking if he intends to marry her. She does not appear again in the novel. In the Greek mythology, Helen marries Menelaus, brother of Agamemnon.
- Dr. Mandelbrod – The mysterious Dr. Mandelbrod plays an important role behind the scenes as Aue's protector and promoter with high-level NSDAP connections, particularly with Himmler. He was an admirer of Max's father and grandfather. At the end of the book he is seen packing his bags to join the enemy, offering his services to the Soviet Union.
- Kriminalkommissars Weser and Clemens – A pair of Kriminalpolizei detectives who are in charge of the investigation into the murders of Aue's mother and her husband. They question and pursue Aue throughout the war, as if he were a prime murder suspect, despite the cases being repeatedly thrown out. They play the role of the Erinyes in the novel.
- Dr. Hohenegg – Aue's friend, a doctor interested in nutrition as well as the condition of soldiers and prisoners in concentration camps. Aue meets him in Ukraine during the German offensive against the Soviet Union. They both take part in battle of Stalingrad and successfully escape before the German surrender. They reunite in Berlin, with Hohenegg revealing to Max how he saved his life by convincing doctors at Stalingrad to operate on him and transport him back to Germany, rather than leaving him for dead. He is depicted at different points in the book.
- Dr. Voss – A lieutenant sent in to the Eastern Front (where he befriends Aue) by the Abwehr and actually a university investigator and specialist in Indo-Germanic, Indo-Iranian and Caucasian languages.

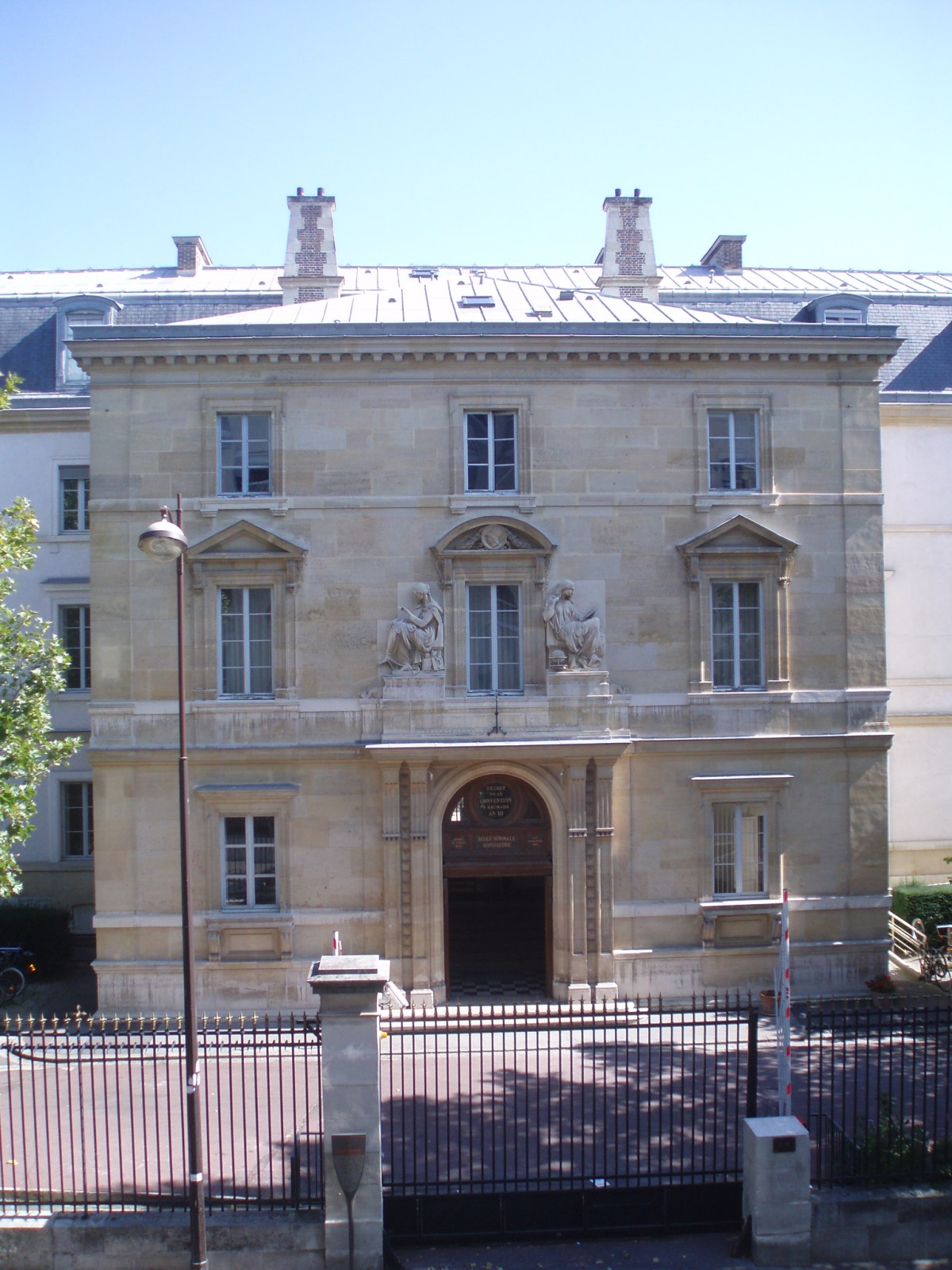
Aue met Brasillach and Rebatet at the École Normale Supérieure

=== Historical characters ===
Littell also includes many historical figures that Max encounters throughout the novel. Amongst them are:

- Top-ranking Nazis: Werner Best, Martin Bormann, Hermann Fegelein, Hans Frank, Reinhard Heydrich, Heinrich Himmler, Adolf Hitler, Ernst Kaltenbrunner, Heinrich Müller, Arthur Nebe, Walter Schellenberg and Albert Speer.
- Other Nazis: Richard Baer, Walter Bierkamp, Paul Blobel, Rudolf Brandt, Adolf Eichmann, Otto Förschner, Odilo Globocnik, Rudolf Höß, Hans Kammler, Arthur Liebehenschel, Josef Mengele, Theodor Oberländer, Otto Ohlendorf, Otto Rasch, Walther von Reichenau, Franz Six, Eduard Wirths and Dieter Wisliceny.
- French collaborators: Robert Brasillach and Lucien Rebatet.

Contemporary writers that have no interaction with Aue are Ernst Jünger, Charles Maurras, Louis-Ferdinand Céline and Paul Carell. Historians cited by Aue are Alan Bullock, Raul Hilberg and Hugh Trevor-Roper.

== Reception ==
=== The original French edition ===
Besides winning two of the most prestigious literary prizes in France (Grand Prix du roman de l'Académie française and Prix Goncourt), Les Bienveillantes was generally very favourably reviewed in the French literary press. Le Figaro proclaimed Littell "man of the year". The editor of the Nouvel Observateur's literary section called it "a great book" and the weekly Le Point stated that the novel has "exploded onto the dreary plain of the literary autumn like a meteor." Even though French filmmaker and professor Claude Lanzmann had mixed feelings about the book, he said: "I am familiar with his subject, and above all I was astounded by the absolute accuracy of the novel. Everything is correct." French historian Pierre Nora called it "an extraordinary literary and historical phenomenon." The book has been compared to War and Peace for its similar scope and ambition.

The Spectator's literary reviewer, Anita Brookner, based on her reading of the novel in the original French, described the book as a "masterly novel ... diabolically (and I use the word advisedly) clever. It is also impressive, not merely as an act of impersonation but perhaps above all for the fiendish diligence with which it is carried out ... presuppose(s) formidable research on the part of the author, who is American, educated in France and writing fluent, idiomatic and purposeful French. This tour de force, which not everyone will welcome, outclasses all other fictions and will continue to do so for some time to come. No summary can do it justice." The Observer's Paris correspondent, Jason Burke, praised the book as an "extraordinary Holocaust novel asks what it is that turns normal people into mass killers," adding that "notwithstanding the controversial subject matter, this is an extraordinarily powerful novel."

Initially, Littell thought that his book would sell around three to five thousand copies. Éditions Gallimard, his publishing house, was more optimistic and decided to print 12,000 copies. Word of mouth and the enthusiastic reviews soon catapulted sales to such an extent that Gallimard had to stop publishing the latest Harry Potter novel in order to meet the demand for The Kindly Ones, which ended up selling more than 700,000 copies in France by the end of 2007. Littell was finally given French citizenship.

=== Other language editions ===
After the book was translated into German, there was widespread debate in Germany, during which Littell was accused of being "a pornographer of violence." Some criticised it from a historical perspective, calling the novel a "strange, monstrous book" and alleging it is "full of errors and anachronisms over wartime German culture."

The New Republic's literary critic Ruth Franklin called it "one of the most repugnant books I have ever read [...] if getting under the skin of a murderer were sufficient to produce a masterpiece, then Thomas Harris would be Tolstoy." Michiko Kakutani, the principal book critic of The New York Times, called the novel "[w]illfully sensationalistic and deliberately repellent" and went on to question the "perversity" of the French literary establishment for praising the novel. In a reply to Kakutani, writer and novelist Michael Korda wrote, "You want to read about Hell, here it is. If you don't have the strength to read it, tough shit. It's a dreadful, compelling, brilliantly researched, and imagined masterpiece, a terrifying literary achievement, and perhaps the first work of fiction to come out of the Holocaust that places us in its very heart, and keeps us there." Writing for Time, American writer and journalist Lev Grossman compared it to Roberto Bolaño's 2666, similar in "their seriousness of purpose, their wild overestimation of the reader's attention span and their interest in physical violence that makes Saw look like Dora the Explorer," but added that while far from perfect, The Kindly Ones "is unmistakably the work of a profoundly gifted writer, if not an especially disciplined one." In her review for Los Angeles Times, novelist and essayist Laila Lalami wrote: "Jonathan Littell has undertaken a very ambitious project in The Kindly Ones, and I think his boldness deserves to be commended. In the end, however, his highly problematic characterization and awkward handling of point of view make this book far more successful as a dramatized historical document than as a novel." British historian Antony Beevor, author of Stalingrad and The Fall of Berlin 1945, reviewing The Kindly Ones in The Times, called it "a great work of literary fiction, to which readers and scholars will turn for decades to come," and listed it as one of the top five books of World War II fiction.

Jonathan Derbyshire, culture editor of the New Statesman, called it "a remarkable novel" and its protagonist "a convincing witness to the defining moral catastrophe of the 20th century." Tim Martin of The Telegraph praised the novel for not being just another story about banality of evil: "it is a magnificently artificial project in character construction, a highly literary and provocative attempt to create a character various enough to match the many discontinuous realities of the apocalyptic Nazi world-view. The result is a sprawling, daring, loose-ended monster of a book, one that justifies its towering subject matter by its persistent and troubling refusal to offer easy answers and to make satisfying sense." Writing for The Guardian, British author James Lasdun criticized the novel for "some large flaws" such as its main character, "a ghoul belonging more to the fictional universe of, say, Bret Easton Ellis's American Psycho", and provocative use of anachronisms, but called it a "monumental inquiry into evil. To say that it falls short of Melville's visionary originality (and lacks, also, the breadth and vitality of Tolstoy, despite the claims of some reviewers) is hardly a criticism. It's a rare book that even invites such comparisons, and for all its faults, for all its problematic use of history, The Kindly Ones does just that." In The Spectator, British journalist and biographer Patrick Marnham wrote: "Dr Aue cannot be brought to trial because he does not exist; on the other hand, he can give us something even more valuable than vengeance, something that no real war criminal can manage, and that is total honesty." Harvard University's English studies' Professor Leland de la Durantaye wrote that The Kindly Ones "is indeed about cruelty and evil in the way that morality plays are, but it is also about evil in history, the weaving together of hundreds of objectives, millions of people, into an ensemble so vast, diverse, and ever-changing that even a well-placed and sharp-sighted observer cannot fully grasp it."

Sales in the United States were considered extremely low. The book was bought by HarperCollins for a rumored $1 million, and the first printing consisted of 150,000 copies. According to Nielsen BookScan – which captures around 70 percent of total sales – by the end of July 2009 only 17,000 copies had been sold.

== Adaptations ==
The novel was adapted into an opera by Catalan composer Hèctor Parra with libretto by Händl Klaus, directed by Calixto Bieito. The work was commissioned by Opera Vlaanderen, premiered on April 24, 2019, in Antwerp.

In 2021, a play based on the novel was also staged at the Moscow Theater on Malaya Bronnaya.
