= Michael Porter (tenor) =

American operatic tenor (b. 1989

- Born: April 20, 1989 (age 37)
- Occupation: Operatic tenor
- Organizations: Oper Frankfurt
- Website: www.michaelportertenor.com

James Michael Porter (born 1989) is an American operatic tenor based at Oper Frankfurt.

== Life and career ==
Porter was born in on 20 April 1989. He studied voice with Scharmal Schrock and Kathy Kilgo at the Jacobs School of Music in Bloomington, completing with a master of arts degree. During his studies, he was also a teaching assistant. He was a member of the young artist programs of the Opera Theatre of Saint Louis and of the Seagle Music Colony, learning roles such as Mole and Juror in Unsuk's Alice in Wonderland, Benvolio in Gounod's Roméo et Juliette and Ferrando in Mozart's Così fan tutte.

Porter made his professional debut at the Fort Worth Opera in 2013 as Brighella in Ariadne auf Naxos by R. Strauss. and also performed as Count Ivrea in Verdi's Un giorno di regno at the Glimmerglass Festival and as Chevalier de la Force in Poulenc's Dialogues des Carmélites in St. Louis.

He spent one year in the opera studio of the Oper Frankfurt and became a member of the ensemble in 2015, performing there roles such as Brighella, Hylas in Les Troyens by Berlioz, Don Ottavio in Mozart's Don Giovanni, David in Wagner's Die Meistersinger von Nürnberg, Ferrando, Tamino in Mozart's Die Zauberflöte, Camille de Rosillon in Lehár's Die lustige Witwe, Narraboth in Salome by R. Strauss, Cassio in Verdi's Otello and Andres in Alban Berg's Wozzeck. He appeared as a guest at the Berlin State Opera and took part in the world premiere of Saskia Bladt's Tonguecat as the King, making his debut at the Bavarian State Opera during the Opera Festival. He performed the role of Andres also at the Opéra de Monte-Carlo. Porter made his debut at the Salzburg Festival in 2018, as Monostatos in Die Zauberflöte.
