= Boštjan Lipovšek =

Slovenian classical horn player (born 1974)

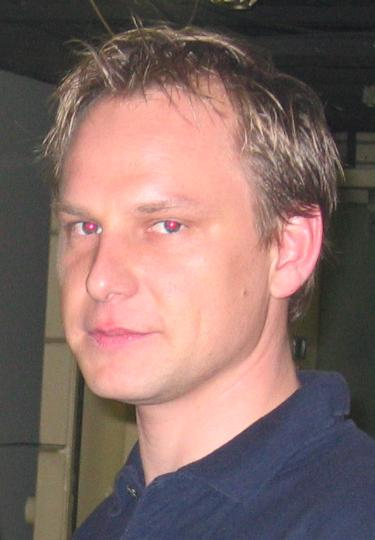

Boštjan Lipovšek (born July 18, 1974) is a Slovenian classical horn player. A native of Celje, he studied at the Academy of Music in Ljubljana with Jože Falout. He is associated with much contemporary Slovenian music and has performed works by Lojze Lebič, Ivo Petrić, Uroš Krek, Jani Golob, Tomaž Habe and Vito Žuraj. In 2008 he was awarded the Prešeren Award.

Lipovšek is one of the most prominent Slovenian horn players. From a musical family, his first mentors were his father and brother. His musical education continued at the Academy of Music with Professor Joze Faloutu, in whose class he graduated and completed his postgraduate studies. He improved with Radovan Vlatković at the Salzburg Mozarteum. While studying in Ljubljana he received the Prešeren Student Award for his interpretation of the 1st Concerto for Horn by Richard Strauss with the RTV Slovenia Symphony Orchestra. In this orchestra shortly afterwards he took his place as solo horn player.

Lipovšek performs as a soloist with the Slovenian Philharmonic Orchestra, the Maribor Philharmonic Orchestra, the Dubrovnik Symphony Orchestra, the Philharmonic Orchestra of Udine, the Chamber Orchestra Padova e Veneto and the Jeunesses Musicales.

In 2001 he won the International Competition Citta di Porcia. In 1999 he was appointed Assistant Professor, and since 2004 has been Assistant Lecturer at the Academy of Music. In 2005 as an assistant professor he began lecturing at the Music Academy in Zagreb. The RTV Slovenia has so far published five CDs, including three solo works and two with chamber ensembles. With the RTV Slovenia Symphony Orchestra, with whom he has played for ten years, he has recorded the horn concertos of Richard Strauss and Mozart, and a number of other works for horn and orchestra, including those of Slovenian composers

Lipovšek has played under the baton of such conductors as Anton Nanut, Uros Lajovic, Marko Letonja, David de Villiers, S. Pelegrino Amato, Gary Brain, Amy Anderson, Yakov Kreizberg and Sian Edwards. As a soloist he has worked with the National Orchestra of Opera La Monnaie in Brussels and the Berlin Symphony Orchestra, and still regularly works with the Mahler Chamber Orchestra.

Since 2006 Lipovšek has been represented by the agency Proartes.
