= Oper Frankfurt =

Opera company in Frankfurt, Germany

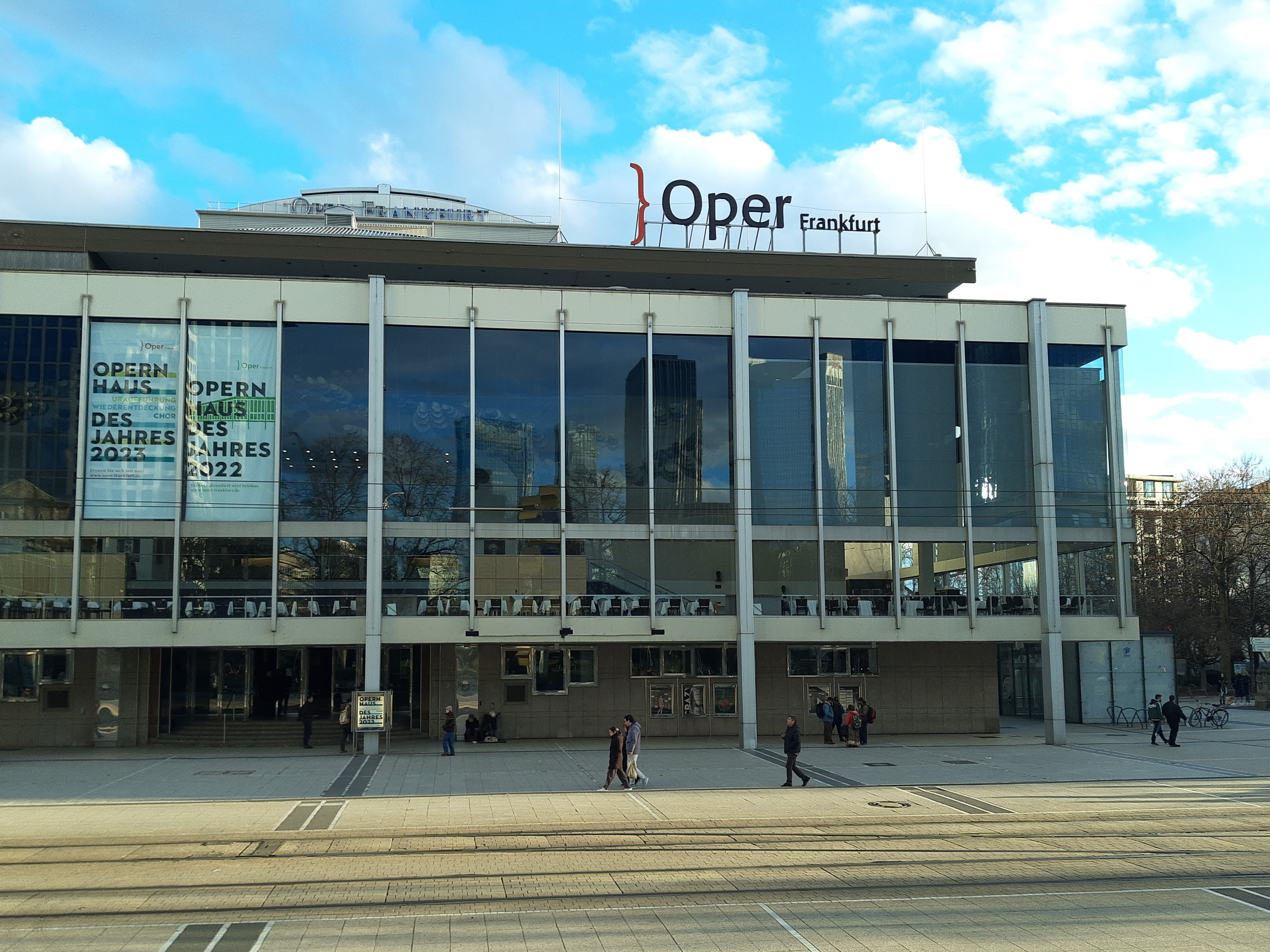
- Oper Frankfurt in 2024, with posters, noting its 'Opera House of the Year' awards
- Formation: 1782
- Location: Frankfurt, Germany
- Intendant: Bernd Loebe
- Parent organization: Städtische Bühnen Frankfurt
- Website: oper-frankfurt.de
- Building details

General information
- Coordinates: 50°06′29″N 8°40′27″E

Other information
- Seating capacity: 1,369 (Opernhaus)
- Public transit: Willy-Brandt-Platz; 11, 12, 14, 15, 16, 17, 18, 20 Willy-Brandt-Platz; N11, N12, N4, N5, N8 Willy-Brandt-Platz

The Oper Frankfurt (Frankfurt Opera) is a German opera company based in Frankfurt.

Opera in Frankfurt am Main has a long tradition, with many world premieres such as Franz Schreker's Der ferne Klang in 1912, Fennimore und Gerda by Frederick Delius in 1919, and Carl Orff's Carmina Burana in 1937. Frankfurt's international recognition began in the Gielen era (1977–1987), when Michael Gielen and stage directors such as Ruth Berghaus collaborated.

A historic opera house from 1880 was destroyed in World War II, and rebuild as a concert hall, the Alte Oper. The present opera house, built in 1963, is under one roof with the stage for drama. The opera orchestra is called Frankfurter Opern- und Museumsorchester. Today's venue for Baroque and contemporary opera is the Bockenheimer Depot, a former tram depot.

Oper Frankfurt has been voted 'Opera House of the Year' by Opernwelt several times since 1996, including 2020, 2022 and 2023, Oper Frankfurt is part of the Städtische Bühnen Frankfurt. It received the "Opera Company of the Year" award at the 2013 International Opera Awards.

== History ==
=== Early history ===
Frankfurt's first opera was Johann Theile's Adam und Eva, performed in 1698 by Johann Velten's touring company. The first operas Goethe experienced in his hometown of Frankfurt were productions by Theobald Marchand's company.

=== 1782–1880 ===
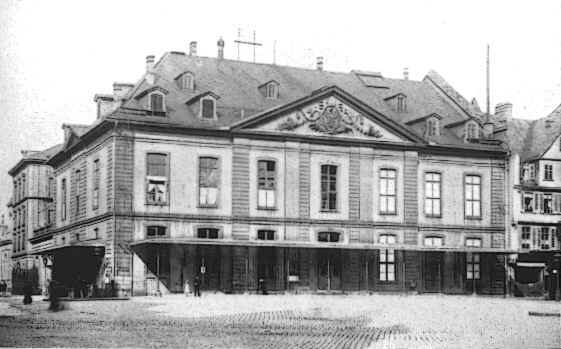
Former theater and opera venue Comoedienhaus in 1902

Opened in 1782, the Comoedienhaus was the first permanent venue of the Frankfurt Theater (drama and opera). In 1878 German violinist Willy Hess took up the leadership of the Oper Frankfurt. He resigned from that post in 1886 to take up a professorship in the Rotterdam Conservatorium voor Muziek.

=== 1880–1944 ===
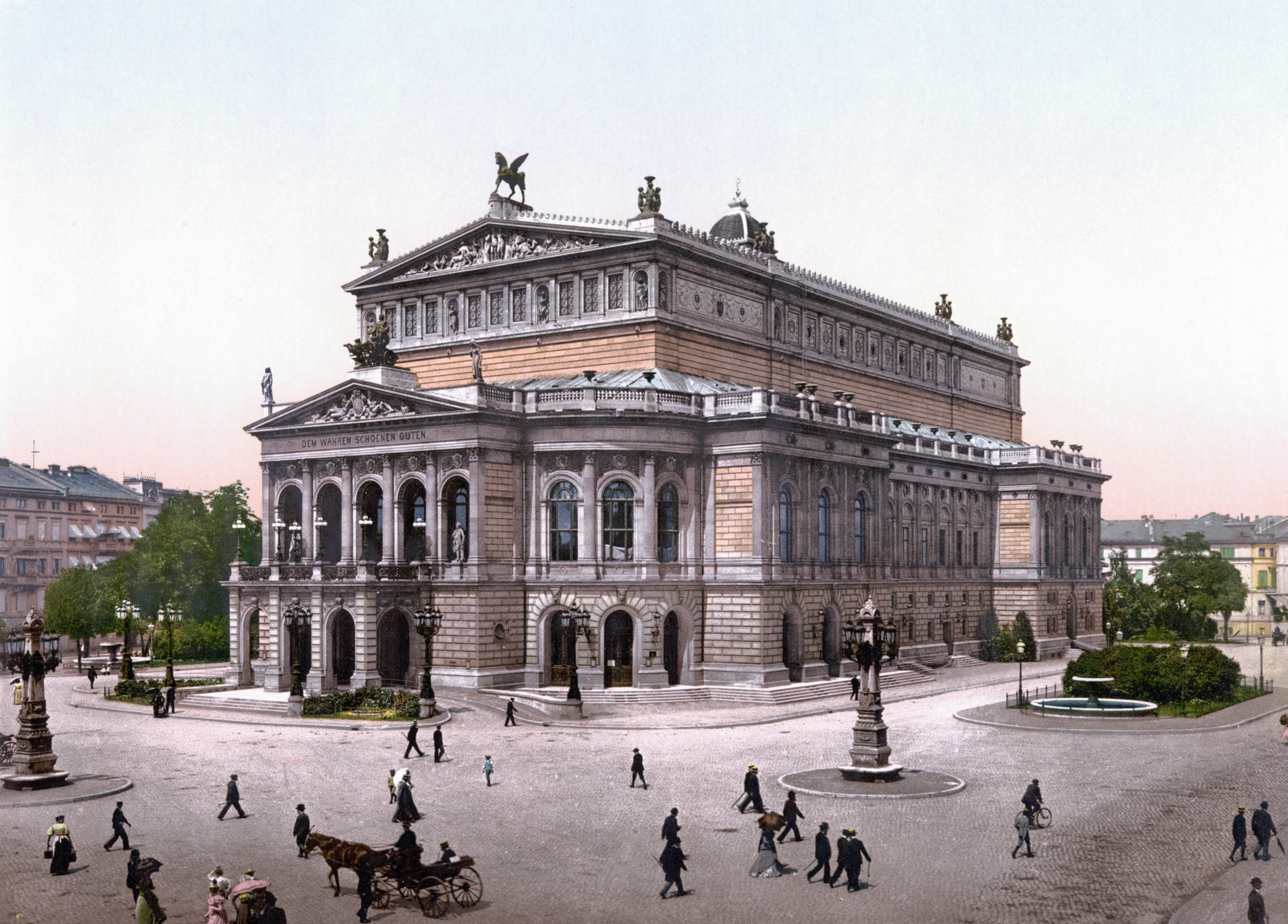
Former opera house (now concert hall Alte Oper) from Opernplatz in 1900

The first representative opera house of the city was inaugurated in Frankfurt in 1880 at Opernplatz. Under the direction of the first Intendant Emil Claar and the first Kapellmeister Felix Otto Dessoff, the house was opened with Mozart's opera Don Giovanni.

During the 1920s, the opera in Frankfurt had more prominent Jewish singers than any other company in Germany, including the tenor Hermann Schramm, bass Hans Erl (the first King in Schreker's Der Schatzgräber), baritone Richard Breitenfeld and contralto Magda Spiegel, who also toured with Frankfurt Opera performing Wagner in the Netherlands. These singers were forced to leave the opera in June 1933. Orff's Carmina Burana was premiered at Oper Frankfurt in 1937. Jewish members of the opera company among those rounded up on 9 November 1938 at the Festhalle Frankfurt, where Erl sang In diesen Heil'gen Hallen, from the Magic Flute for the deportees. Members of Frankfurt Opera were sent to Auschwitz and other camps where they perished.

=== 1945–1970s ===
Der fliegende Holländer, Solti/Buckwitz, Tour Paris 1959

The opera house was damaged in an air raid in January 1944, and then almost completely destroyed in March. In 1952, Georg Solti became Generalmusikdirektor (GMD) and Intendant of the Oper Frankfurt, where he remained in charge for nine years. He worked together with general manager (Generalintendant) Harry Buckwitz. The ensemble was invited to guest performances at the Théâtre des Nations in Paris.

A new house for opera and drama was built, completed in 1963 at the Theaterplatz (now Willy-Brandt-Platz).

=== The Gielen era ===
From 1977 to 1987, Frankfurt Opera was led by Michael Gielen. This decade became known as the "Gielen era", notable for the music of a conductor who was also a composer, and directors including Ruth Berghaus and Hans Neuenfels, whose productions of standard works such as Verdi's Aida and Wagner's Ring Cycle were thought-provoking. Operas which received their world premieres at the house were also performed again, including Franz Schreker's Die Gezeichneten.

=== 1987–present ===
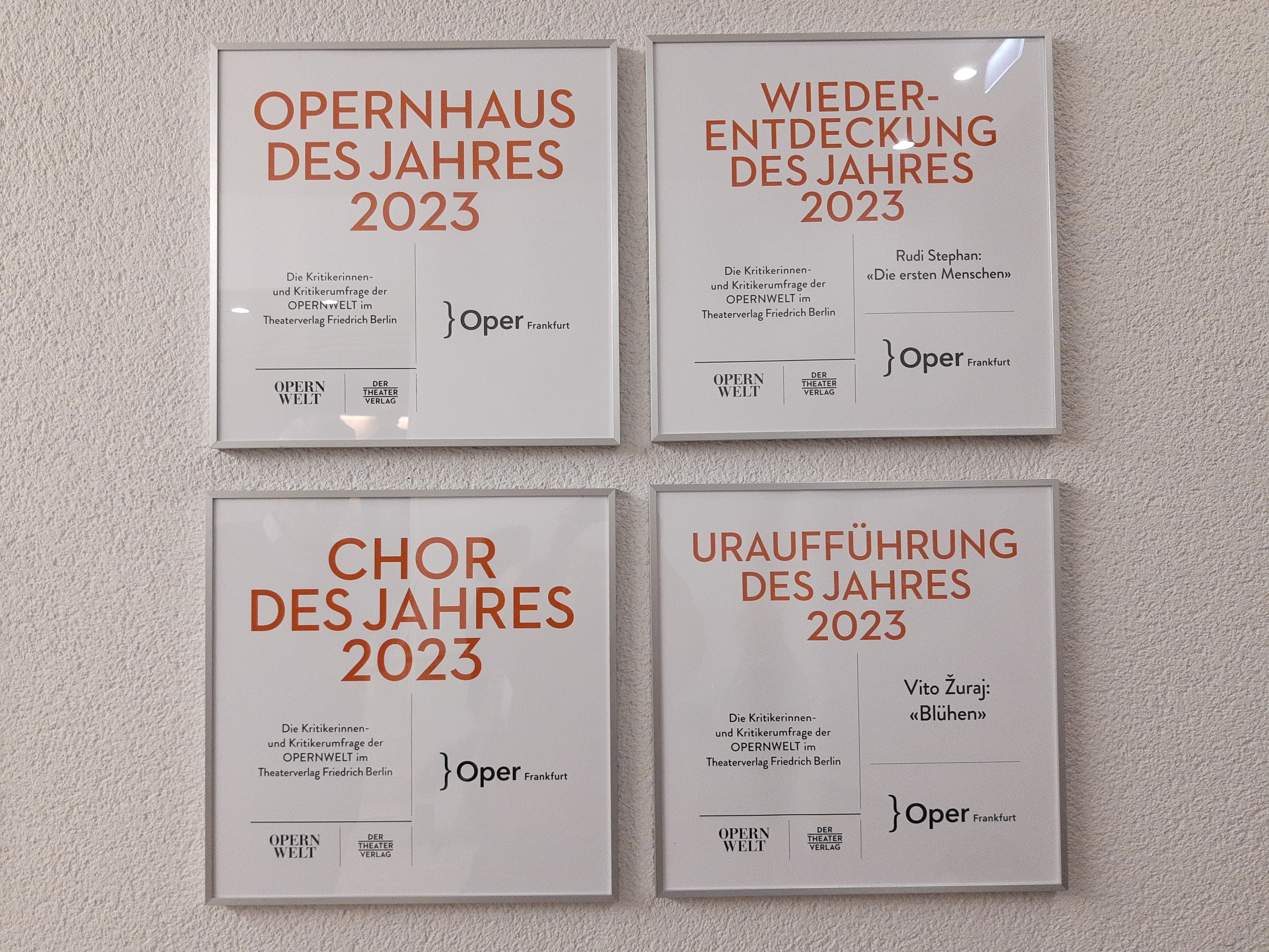
Four awards in 2023

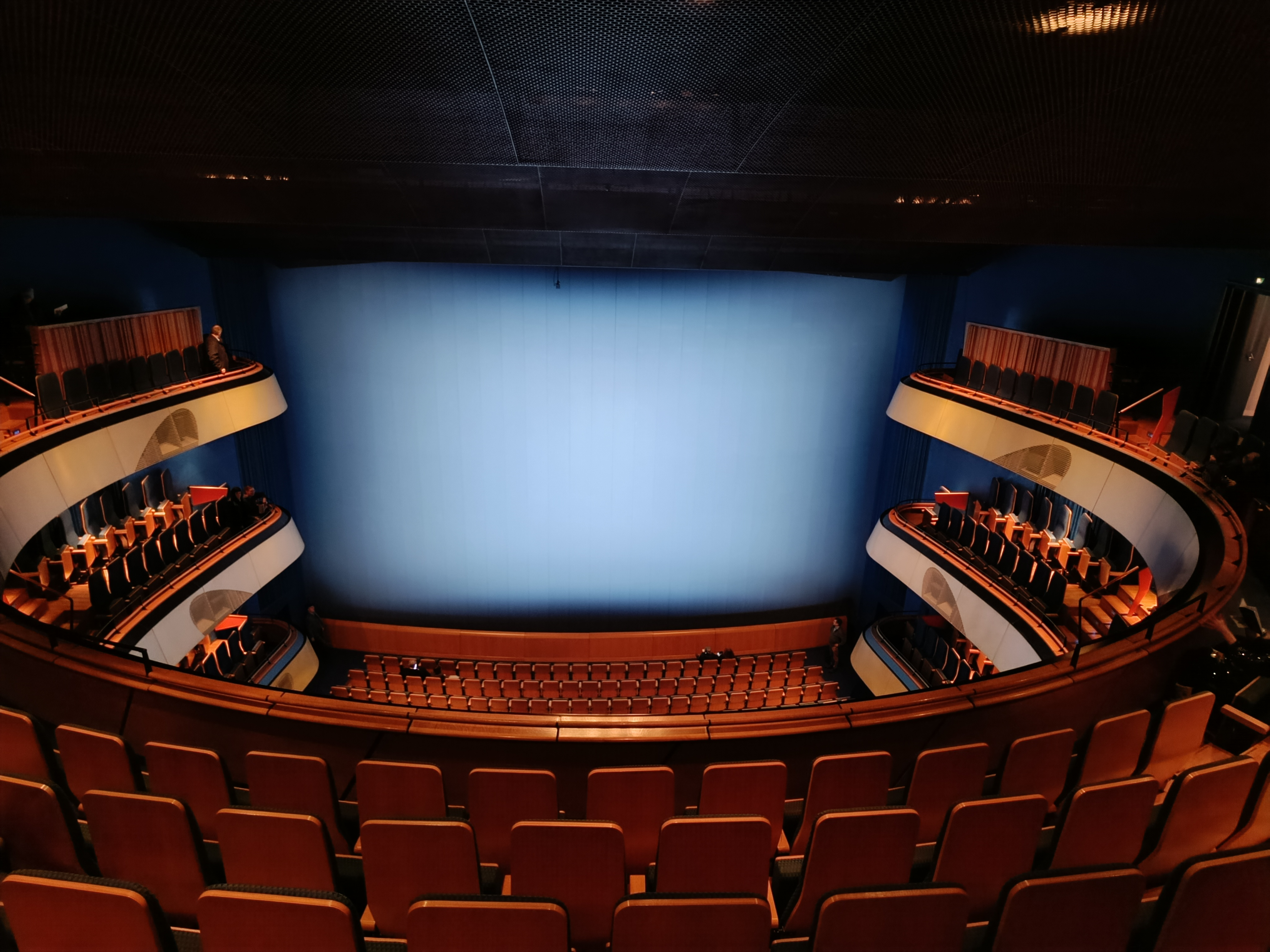
Interior of the opera house in 2024

The stage of the opera house was destroyed by a fire in November 1987. The opera house was rebuilt and opened in April 1991. Many famous singers started their career with the company, including Franz Völker, Edda Moser, Cheryl Studer, and Diana Damrau, and many established artists have been engaged there in recent seasons including Christian Gerhaher, whose roles here have included Monteverdi's L'Orfeo and his first Wolfram in Wagner's Tannhäuser, Piotr Beczała in Massenet's Werther and Jan-Hendrik Rootering in Wagner's Parsifal.

From 2008 to 2023, Sebastian Weigle was GMD of the company. Weigle made commercial recordings of opera with the company for the OEHMS Classics label. Since 2002, Bernd Loebe has served as Intendant of the company. The company's current GMD is Thomas Guggeis, since 2023. In October 2026, Oper Frankfurt announced the extension of both Loebe's and Guggeis' respective contracts through August 2032.

Oper Frankfurt was voted "Opera House of the Year" by the magazine Opernwelt in 1996, 2003, 2015, 2018, 2020, 2022, 2023, and 2024. In 2023, they received awards also in the categories Chorus, directed by Tilman Michael, world premiere (for Blühen), and rediscovery (for Die ersten Menschen). The company received the distinction again in 2024, with recognition also in the categories Chorus and Production (shared) for Wagner's Tannhäuser, conducted by Guggeis and directed by Matthew Wild. Director of the year was Lydia Steier, including for her Frankfurt production of Verdi's Aida, and singer of the year John Osborn, including for his Frankfurt portrayal of Éléazar in Halevy's La Juive.

As of 2023, new buildings for the Städtische Bühnen are planned.

== Artistic leadership ==
The first conductors had the title Kapellmeister. From 1924, the title was GMD, who often also held the administrative leadership Intendant (Int.).

- Felix Otto Dessoff (1880–1892, Kapellmeister)
- Ludwig Rottenberg (1893–1924, Kapellmeister)
- Clemens Krauss (1924–1929, GMD)
- Hans Wilhelm Steinberg (1929–1933)
- Bertil Wetzelsberger (1933–1934)
- Karl Maria Zwißler (1935–1936)
- Georg Ludwig Jochum (1937–1938)
- Franz Konwitschny (1938–1944, GMD)
- Bruno Vondenhoff (1945–1951, GMD)
- Georg Solti (1952–1961, GMD)
- Lovro von Matačić (1961–1966, GMD)
- Christoph von Dohnányi (1967–1977, GMD)
- Michael Gielen (1977–1987, GMD & Int.)
- Gary Bertini (1987–1991, GMD & Int.)
- Sylvain Cambreling (1993–1997, GMD & artistic Int.)
- Martin Steinhoff (1997–2002, Int.)
- Paolo Carignani (1999–2008, GMD)
- Bernd Loebe (2002–present, Int.)
- Sebastian Weigle (2008–2023, GMD)
- Thomas Guggeis (2023–present, GMD)

== Premieres ==
World premieres at the Frankfurt Opera have included:

Date	Work	Composer
16 September 1810	Silvana	Carl Maria von Weber
4 April 1819	Zemire und Azor	Louis Spohr
20 January 1851	Die Opernprobe	Albert Lortzing
26 November 1853	Rübezahl	Friedrich von Flotow
8 December 1881	Das Käthchen von Heilbronn	Carl Martin Reinthaler
12 November 1902	Dornröschen	Engelbert Humperdinck
18 August 1912	Der ferne Klang	Franz Schreker
15 March 1913	Das Spielwerk und die Prinzessin	Franz Schreker
25 April 1918	Die Gezeichneten	Franz Schreker
21 October 1919	Fennimore und Gerda	Frederick Delius
21 January 1920	Der Schatzgräber	Franz Schreker
1 July 1920	Die ersten Menschen	Rudi Stephan
14 May 1921	Die Prinzessin Girnara	Egon Wellesz
26 March 1922	Sancta Susanna	Paul Hindemith
9 July 1924	Der Sprung über den Schatten	Ernst Krenek
8 November 1924	Sakahra	Simon Bucharoff
25 February 1926	Die zehn Küsse	Bernhard Sekles
14 November 1926	Der Golem	Eugen d'Albert
25 December 1926	Die Lästerschule	Paul von Klenau
1 February 1930	Von heute auf morgen	Arnold Schönberg
23 March 1930	Achtung, Aufnahme!!	Wilhelm Grosz
25 May 1930	Transatlantic	George Antheil
31 January 1934	Prinz Eugen der edle Ritter	Max Pflugmacher
22 May 1935	Die Zaubergeige	Werner Egk
26 May 1936	Doktor Johannes Faust	Hermann Reutter
8 June 1937	Carmina Burana	Carl Orff
13 January 1942	Columbus	Werner Egk
7 September 1942	Odysseus	Hermann Reutter
20 February 1943	Die Kluge	Carl Orff
1 March 1962	Die Alkestiade	Louise Talma
24 September 1964	Dame Kobold	Gerhard Wimberger
15 June 1986	Stephen Climax	Hans Zender
14 November 1986	Die Reise zum Mittelpunkt der Erde	Hans-Joachim Hespos
12 December 1987	Europeras 1 & 2	John Cage
18 May 1989	What Where	Heinz Holliger
14 June 2002	Dr. Popels fiese Falle	Moritz Eggert
7 October 2006	Caligula	Detlev Glanert
29 June 2014	Der goldene Drache	Péter Eötvös
14 September 2014	Sirenen – Bilder des Begehrens und des Vernichtens	Rolf Riehm
31 May 2015	An unserem Fluss (By our River)	Lior Navok
12 November 2017	Der Mieter	Arnulf Herrmann
27 June 2021	Inferno	Lucia Ronchetti
23 January 2023	Blühen	Vito Žuraj

== Städtische Bühnen ==
Oper Frankfurt (Frankfurt Opera) and Schauspiel Frankfurt (Theatre Frankfurt) are part of the Städtische Bühnen Frankfurt am Main GmbH.

== Statistics ==
The opera house has 1,369 seats. As of April 2023, the capacity utilization of the Oper Frankfurt in the 2022/23 season was 81%. About 11 premieres and 15 revivals were shown per season.

== See also ==
- Frankfurter Opern- und Museumsorchester
- Bockenheimer Depot
- Schauspiel Frankfurt
