= Comoedienhaus =

Drama theater and opera house in Frankfurt, Germany

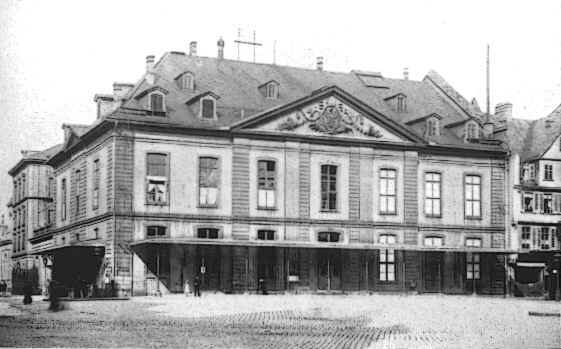
The Comoedienhaus theater in 1902, the year of the theater's final show.

The Comoedienhaus theater, first opened on 3 September 1782, and demolished in 1911, was the first drama theater and opera house built in the German city of Frankfurt. Designed by renowned architect Johann Andreas Hardt Lieb, the Frankfurter National-Theater (which in 1842 became the Stadttheater, later renamed Comoedienhaus) became a popular venue for entertainment, particularly among the middle-class members of Frankfurt's society, and became known, even outside of Frankfurt itself, for its dramas and operas. It remained a centre of entertainment for over 100 years, and by the mid-nineteenth century, the population of the city was so great, and the theater still so popular, that the theater was regularly completely filled, despite the relatively high expense of admission. As the first theater of performing arts in Frankfurt, it was a major contributor to the popularisation of the performing arts in Frankfurt and elsewhere in Germany.

The performances seen within the Comoedienhaus included dramas and related cabarets, operas and concerts, among other novelty performances.

Over the life of the theater, several well-known performers, musicians, and composers worked in the theater or attended its cabarets. These included Wolfgang Amadeus Mozart, who played several concerts there; F.L.Æ. Kunzen, who was its musical director from 1792 to 1794; Friedrich Schiller, whose Intrigue and Love was first performed within the theater on 15 April 1784, and Johann Wolfgang von Goethe, who attended several of the cabarets at the theater. Actor, writer and stage director Gustav Friedrich Wilhelm Großmann also performed and directed several performances and cabarets seen at the Comoedienhaus.

The last cabaret was performed at the Comoedienhaus on 30 October 1902, 120 years after its opening, following the dwindling revenue the theater was gathering toward the end of the nineteenth century. The theater was demolished nine years later, in 1911.
