= The Black Swan (short story) =

German novella by Thomas Mann

- The German edition
- Author: Thomas Mann
- Language: German
- Published: 1954
- Publication place: Germany
- Media type: Print

The Black Swan (German: Die Betrogene: Erzählung) is a German novella written by Thomas Mann, first published in 1954. A period work, it takes place in Düsseldorf, Germany, in the mid-1920s.

== Plot summary ==
Rosalie, a 50-year-old widow, finds her youthful manner diminished by the "organic phenomena of her time of life," or menopause. She lives with her adult unmarried daughter and an adolescent son, both of whom juxtapose youth to her "superannuated" purpose in life.

The family hires a young, American-born man to tutor for her son. Rosalie is strongly attracted to him and is soon infatuated. Her daughter disapproves more strongly now of her still-socializing mother. Then, seemingly miraculously, Rosalie's menopause reverses. Where her vitality and sexual awareness would be in decline, she is in a heightened state of sexual awareness which includes menstrual bleeding.

Rosalie plans a family trip and declares her intentions and availability to the young man. They plan a liaison in the Rhine castle Schloss Benrath, but it never takes place. She is later found in her bed unconscious due to a hemorrhage caused by what soon proves to be a fatal metastatic tumor in her uterus.

The surgeons' commentary include a discussion on the possible causes of Rosalie's newfound youth. Cancer was an obvious cause of her tumor, but one doctor insinuates that it could have been the yearning for love and her altered or re-awakened erotic personality that stimulated her ovaries, thereby causing the cancerous growth.

== Themes ==
The setting for the story and Europe in transition after the First World War creates the old-fashioned and modern age comparisons which are developed strongly in the characters of Rosalie's family. The graphic descriptions in female biology, symbolic and overt sexuality and death create a dark picture for life's twilight. He revisits mortality and like Death in Venice, of 1912, comments on societal attitudes and age. As in that work, Rosalie dies before any interest is consummated.
