= Jonathan Littell =

American-French writer

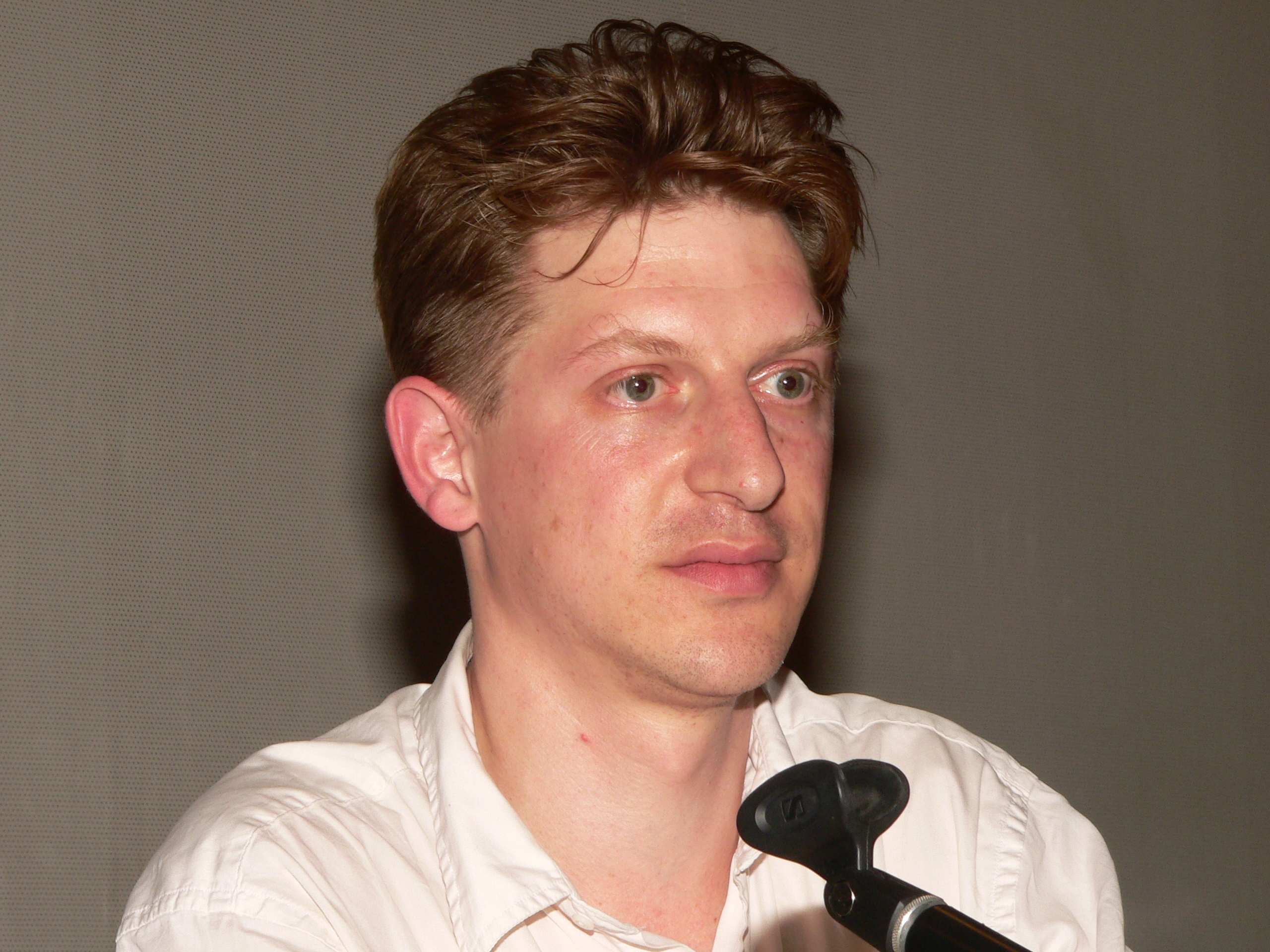
- Jonathan Littell in 2007
- Born: October 10, 1967 (age 59); New York City, New York, United States
- Occupation: Novelist
- Relatives: Robert Littell (father)
- Writing career
- Notable work: The Kindly Ones (Les Bienveillantes)
- Notable awards: Prix Goncourt; 2006; Grand Prix du roman de l'Académie française 2006

Jonathan Littell (born October 10, 1967) is an American-born French-language writer living in Barcelona. His first novel written in French, The Kindly Ones (2006; Les Bienveillantes), won two major French awards, i.e. the Prix Goncourt and the Prix de l'Académie française.

Littell grew up in France and the United States and is a citizen of both countries. After acquiring his bachelor's degree, he worked for a humanitarian organisation for nine years, leaving his job in 2001 in order to concentrate on writing.

== Early life and career ==
Littell is the son of author Robert Littell. Although his grandparents were Jews who emigrated from Russia to the United States at the end of the 19th century, Littell does not define himself as a Jew "at all," and is quoted as saying, "for me Judaism is more [of] a historical background."

Born in New York City, Littell arrived in France at age three, then completed part of his education in his native country from age 13 to 16, before returning to France to achieve his baccalauréat. He returned again to the United States where he attended Yale University and graduated with a bachelor's degree in 1989. During his years at Yale, he finished his first book, Bad Voltage, and later on met William S. Burroughs, who left a lasting impression on him. Due to his influence, he started to read Burroughs, as well as Sade, Blanchot, Genet, Céline, Bataille and Beckett. Afterwards, he worked as a translator, rendering French works by Sade, Blanchot, Genet and Quignard into English. At the same time, he started to write a ten-volume book, but gave up the project after the third volume.

From 1994 to 2001, he worked for the international humanitarian organization Action Against Hunger, working mainly in Bosnia and Herzegovina, but also in Chechnya, Democratic Republic of Congo, Sierra Leone, Caucasus, Afghanistan and Moscow. In January 2001 he was victim of an ambush in Chechnya, during which he was slightly wounded. In the same year he decided to quit his job in order to concentrate on the research of his second book, The Kindly Ones. During that time, he also worked as a consultant for humanitarian organizations.

Littell obtained French citizenship (while being able to keep his American citizenship) in March 2007 after French officials made use of a clause stating that any French speaker whose "meritorious actions contribute to the glory of France" are allowed to become citizens, despite not fulfilling the requirement that he live in France for more than six months out of the year.

== Works ==
Littell's novel The Kindly Ones was written in French and was published in France in 2006. The novel is the story of World War II and the Eastern Front, through the fictional memories of an articulate SS officer named Maximilien Aue.

Littell said he was inspired to write the novel after seeing a photograph of Zoya Kosmodemyanskaya, a Soviet partisan executed by the Wehrmacht. He traces the original inspiration for the book from seeing Claude Lanzmann’s film Shoah, an acclaimed documentary about the Holocaust, in 1991. He began research for the book in 2001 and started the first draft eighteen months later, after he had read around two hundred books about the Third Reich and the Eastern Front, as well as visiting Germany, East Europe and Caucasus. Littell claims that he undertook the creation of his main character, Aue, by imagining what he himself would have done had he been born in pre-war Germany and had become a National Socialist.

Littell's only previously published book, the cyberpunk novel Bad Voltage, which Littell considers "a very bad science-fiction novel", tells the story of Lynx, a "half-breed" who lives in a futuristic Paris. Many scenes in the novel take place in the Paris Catacombs; he also includes an unusual appendix in this novel which lists all the music and songs he listened to while composing. In addition, Littell has published a detailed intelligence report about the security organs of the Russian Federation, an analysis of Léon Degrelle's book La Campagne de Russie, influenced by the works of the sociologist Klaus Theweleit, one book with four texts written before The Kindly Ones and, finally, a short essay.

Following The Kindly Ones, Littell directed a documentary titled Wrong Elements, in which he interviews the former child soldiers of Joseph Kony. The film was screened out of competition at the 2016 Cannes Film Festival.

== Awards ==
The Kindly Ones won the 2006 Prix Goncourt and the grand prix du roman of the Académie française. By the end of 2007, more than 700,000 copies had been sold in France.

Littell was recognised for his contributions in the area of overwrought erotica when the English translation of The Kindly Ones won the 2009 Bad Sex in Fiction Award from The Literary Review, a British literary journal. Littell reportedly beat tough competition for that year's honours, with Philip Roth and Nick Cave among the writers filling out the short list.

He won the Prix Sade in 2018 for Une vieille histoire.

== Commentary ==
In a May 2008 interview with Haaretz, Littell accused Israel of using the Holocaust for political gain and likened Israel's behavior in the occupied territories to that of the Nazis prior to World War II: "If the [Israeli] government would let the soldiers do worse things, they would. Everyone says, 'Look how the Germans dealt with the Jews even before the Holocaust: cutting the beards, humiliating them in public, forcing them to clean the street.' That kind of stuff happens in the territories every day. Every goddamn day." However, he also said that "We really cannot compare the two".

== Personal life ==
Jonathan Littell married a Belgian woman and had two children with her, Émir (b. 2000) and Alma Littell (b. 2002).

== List of works ==
- 1989 – Bad Voltage
- 2006 – Les Bienveillantes (The Kindly Ones, 2009)
- 2006 – The Security Organs of the Russian Federation. A Brief History 1991–2004
- 2008 – Le Sec et L'Humide
- 2008 – Études
- 2008 – Georgisches Reisetagebuch
- 2009 – Récit sur Rien
- 2009 – Tchétchénie, An III
- 2010 – En Pièces
- 2011 – Triptyque: Trois études sur Francis Bacon (Triptych: Three Studies after Francis Bacon, 2013)
- 2011 – The Invisible Enemy
- 2012 – Une vieille histoire
- 2012 – Carnets de Homs (Syrian Notebooks: Inside the Homs uprising, 2015)
- 2013 – The Fata Morgana Books
- 2018 – Une vielle histoire (nouvelle version)
- 2022 – De l'agression russe. Écrits polémiques
- 2023 – Un endroit inconvénient (with photographs by Antoine d'Agata)
- 2024 – The Damp and the Dry (translated to English by Max Lawton)
- 2026 – L'Heritage

== List of awards ==
- Grand prix du roman de l'Académie française, 2006, for Les Bienveillantes
- Prix Goncourt, 2006, for Les Bienveillantes
- Bad Sex in Fiction Award, 2009, for The Kindly Ones
