= Vito Žuraj =

Slovenian composer

Vito Žuraj (born 7 May 1979) is a Slovenian composer of contemporary music whose works are performed internationally.

== Career ==
Born in Maribor, he obtained a degree in composition and music theory with Marko Mihevc at the Ljubljana Academy of Music. He then moved to Dresden to further his education at the Hochschule für Musik Carl Maria von Weber with Lothar Voigtländer, and moved to study with Wolfgang Rihm at the Hochschule für Musik Karlsruhe, where he completed a master's degree in computer music, supervised by Thomas A. Troge.

Žuraj writes chamber, vocal and symphonic music. He has composed for Boštjan Lipovšek, among others. Several of his symphonic works have been performed by the Maribor Philharmonic, the RTV Slovenia Symphony Orchestra, and the Slovenian Philharmonic Orchestra, with Simon Robinson, Lior Shambadal and Marko Letonja conducting. Festivals included the Salzburg Festival, the Ultraschall festival in Berlin, the Darmstädter Ferienkurse and the Wittener Tage für neue Kammermusik, the Gaudeamus Muziekweek and the Takefu International Music Festival in Japan. His works have been commissioned and performed by orchestras including the New York Philharmonic, the BBC Symphony Orchestra and the hr-Sinfonieorchester, and by ensembles such as Ensemble Modern, Klangforum Wien, Ensemble Recherche, and the RIAS Kammerchor, by conductors such as Sylvain Cambreling, Beat Furrer, Johannes Kalitzke, Brad Lubman, Franck Ollu, Matthias Pintscher and Emilio Pomàrico.

== Awards ==
- 2017 Claudio Abbado Composition Prize of the Orchester-Akademie of the Berlin Philharmonic

== Works ==
=== Stage works ===
- Blühen (2023)

=== Orchestral works ===
- Automatones (2023)

== Discography ==
- Maxply (2010)
- Crosscourt (2008)
- Chamber Music (2003)
- Composer's presentation – Vito Žuraj (2001)
