= Bernd Loebe =

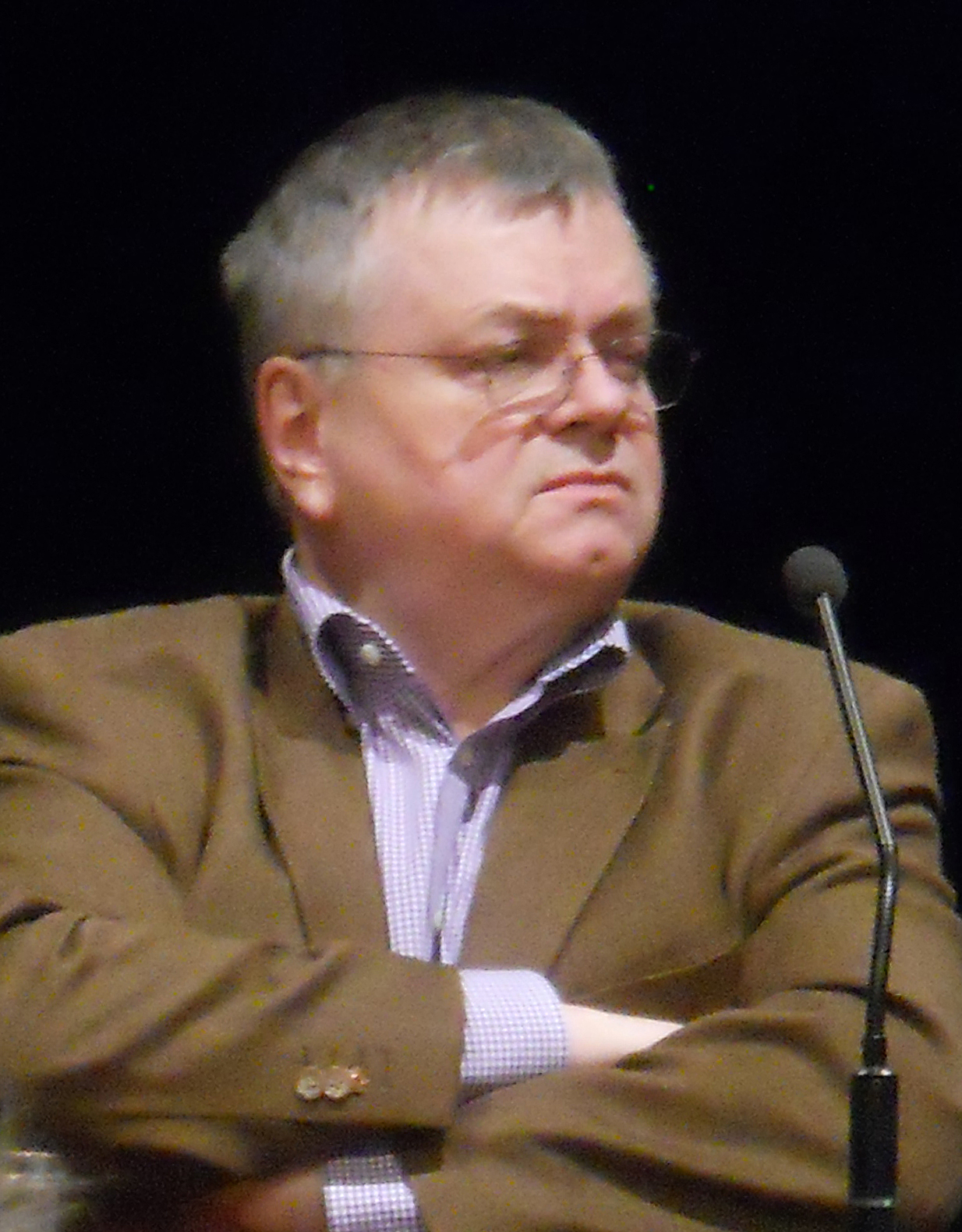
- Bernd Loebe in 2014
- Born: 15 December 1952 (age 73); Frankfurt, Germany
- Education: University of Frankfurt
- Occupations: Music journalist; Opera manager
- Organizations: Frankfurter Allgemeine Zeitung (FAZ); Hessischer Rundfunk; La Monnaie; Oper Frankfurt
- Awards: International Opera Award

Bernd Loebe (born 15 December 1952) is a German music journalist and opera manager. After working as a journalist with a focus on opera and voice for the Frankfurter Allgemeine Zeitung (FAZ), Neue Musikzeitung, Opernwelt and Hessischer Rundfunk, he was artistic director of the opera house of Brussels, La Monnaie, from 1990, and has been Intendant of the Oper Frankfurt since 2002, where he encouraged a capable ensemble, international guest artists, and the production of rarely performed operas. He received the 2018 International Opera Award in the category Leadership in Opera.

== Life ==
Born in Frankfurt am Main, Loebe began to visit the theatre at age 14, and was impressed at age 16 by a performance of Mozart's Die Zauberflöte conducted by Christoph von Dohnanyi. He studied law at the University of Frankfurt, and privately studied the piano. He worked in the music department of the FAZ from 1975 to 1980, also for the Neue Musikzeitung and the journal Opernwelt. He worked freelance for the broadcaster Hessischer Rundfunk, moderating the morning journal Vor dem Alltag and responsible for the biographical Lexikon der Stimmen, presenting in alphabetical order world-famous and forgotten opera singers in interviews and recordings. In 1979, Loebe moved to Hessischer Rundfunk, responsible for opera and especially its international festivals such as the Bayreuth Festival and Salzburg Festival.

In November 1990, the opera La Monnaie in Brussels appointed Loebe as artistic director. He worked as a consultant for the Oper Frankfurt from 2000, where he became Intendant with the 2002/03 season. His contract was renewed several times and now runs to 2023. When he took up the post, he faced a reduced municipal budget. In his first season, he produced Schubert's Fierrabras staged by Tilman Knabe, a good choice to international interest reviewers. Other works that season included operas between Joseph Haydn and Salvatore Sciarrino: Wagner's Der fliegende Holländer staged by Christof Nel, Schreker's Der Schatzgräber, Britten's The Turn of the Screw and Die Frau ohne Schatten by Richard Strauss. He has consistently supported an ensemble, performing eight to nine new productions per season, sometimes conducted in collaboration with other opera houses. After his first season, the Oper Frankfurt received the Opernhaus des Jahres award by the critics of Opernwelt, the second time since 1995. The opera house was awarded the title again for the 2018/19 season. For the 2014/15 season, it received the award by the journal Deutsche Bühne for the best program.

Loebe has supported the formation of a capable ensemble working with international guest artists, and the production of operas beyond the standard repertoire. In an interview, he said that he alone decides the playbill for a season, based on his interest and curiosity. Passionate about voices, he has selected members for the ensemble with long-range plans, and a focus on team spirit. He is present in eight of ten performances at the Oper Frankfurt, and led the opera house to international recognition.

In 2014, the opera house produced the world premiere of Rolf Riehm's Sirenen, based on the Greek myth of Odysseus, Circe and the Sirens. In the 2018/19 season, Loebe produced Franz Schreker's Der Ferne Klang which had received its world premiere in Frankfurt, conducted by Sebastian Weigle, with Jennifer Holloway and Ian Koziara in the leading roles. The production was dedicated to Michael Gielen who had initiated the Schreker revival in Frankfurt with Die Gezeichneten in 1979. In the 2019/20 season, Loebe programmed Rossini's Otello, for the first time in Frankfurt, staged by Damiano Michieletto with Enea Scala in the title role. Loebe matched the voices of Asmik Grigorian, named singer of the year by Opernwelt, and Joshua Guerrero, who debuted in Germany as Puccini's Manon Lescaut and Chevalier des Grieux, staged by Àlex Ollé. Schostakovitch's Lady Macbeth von Mzensk was given with Anja Kampe and Dmitry Belosselskiy. Loebe chose to present Fauré's only opera Pénélope in its second production in Germany, staged by Corinna Tetzel, conducted by Joana Mallwitz, named conductor of the year by Opernwelt, and Paula Murrihy and Eric Laporte in the leading roles.

Since March 2009, Loebe has also been vice president of the Deutsche Akademie der Darstellenden Künste. In June 2010, he was elected president of the Deutsche Opernkonferenz of 13 opera houses in Germany, Austria, and Switzerland. In 2019, he was elected again for a fourth term. In October 2018, Loebe was named the successor of Gustav Kuhn as Intendant of the Tiroler Festspiele Erl, beginning on 1 September 2019. In May 2023, it was announced that Loebe would be leaving the festival at the end of the 2024 summer season.

== Awards ==
- 2018: International Opera Awards in the category Leadership in Opera
- 2024: Goethe Plaque of the City of Frankfurt
