= Käthe Heidersbach =

German soprano

Käthe Heidersbach (30 October 1897 – 26 February 1979) was a German operatic soprano.

== Life and career ==
Born in Breslau, Heidersbach first wanted to become a pianist and studied piano at the conservatory of her hometown. She then took singing lessons with Juan Luria (who was later interned by the Nazi regime and murdered at the Sobibor extermination camp in 1943), Lola Beeth and Fred Husler. The soprano made her debut in 1922 at the Stadttheater in Detmold and was engaged by the Wrocław Opera from 1924 to 1927. From 1927 to 1944, she was engaged at the Staatsoper Unter den Linden in Berlin.

Guest performances led the artist to Dresden, Amsterdam, Vienna, Zurich, Hamburg, Munich and Barcelona. She was engaged at the Bayreuth Festival from 1928 to 1934, where she sang Waldvogel, Freia, Gutrune, Elsa and Eva, and in 1934 a flower girl in the first Bayreuth new production of Parsifal since Richard Wagner's world premiere production.

In 1934 she was appointed a Prussian Kammersängerin at the Staatsoper Unter den Linden. According to Joseph Goebbels, however, she was not satisfied there, as she is said to have complained to him in March 1939 about too little singing time. On 2 June 1939, she sang Eve in a gala performance of Die Meistersinger von Nürnberg in honour of the Regent Prince Paul of Yugoslavia, which was also attended by Adolf Hitler. Herbert von Karajan was the conductor. This performance became legendary because Karajan, who conducted without a score, got out of time and thus incurred the wrath of the Führer. In September 1941, Heidersbach performed in occupied Krakow as "bearer of the German cultural will in the East", among other places at the Theater der SS und der Polizei there. At this occasion she had lunch with the Governor General Hans Frank.

Heidersbach's first marriage was to Johannes Eppinger. She entered her second marriage in 1928 with the Swedish opera singer Nils Källe who was engaged at the opera of Breslau from 1924 to 1927. After 1945, she worked as a concert soprano and teacher in Stockholm, where she had moved to.

Heidersbach died in Kyrkhult, Olofström Municipality, Sweden at the age of 82.

== Recordings ==
- Schlesische Sänger von Weltruf, with Rose Ader-Trigona, Susanne Dessoir, Irene Eisinger, Käthe Heidersbach, George Henschel. [Munich]: Koch Internat., 1991.
- Lebendige Vergangenheit - Four German Sopranos Of The Past (CD). Margarete Bäumer, Emmy Bettendorf, Käthe Heidersbach, Else Gentner-Fischer, Preiser/Naxos, Wien 1998 [Heidersbach interpretiert Szenen aus Le nozze di Figaro, The Magic Flute, Der Freischütz and Tannhäuser]
- Max Lorenz (tenor): Max Lorenz – The complete Electrola recordings 1927–42, Choir and orchestra of the Staatsoper Berlin, with Käthe Heidersbach, including O Fürstin! (Second scene of the 2nd act of the opera Tannhäuser)
- Extract from Giordano's Andrea Chénier, choir and orchestra of the Staatsoper Berlin, conductor: Robert Heger, with Helge Rosvaenge, Käthe Heidersbach, Willi Domgraf-Fassbaender among others (Highlights in German language - historical recording from 1942) [Vinyl LP]
- Extract from Arabella by Hugo von Hofmannsthal and Richard Strauss, with Käthe Heidersbach, Lotte Lehmann (soprano) and the orcheqstra of the Staatsoper Berlin, conductor: Richard Jäger, both in 1933 (DRA 50-07580): Er ist der Richtige nicht für mich... Aber der Richtige, wenn's einen gibt für mich. and Mein Elemer!
- Extract from Weber's Der Freischütz, "Wie? Was? Entsetzen", with Irene Eisinger, Käthe Heidersbach and Erik Wirl. Historische Aufnahme auf: Abc Der Gesangskunst Teil 2, CD2, 2000
