= Koziara =

Koziara is a Polish surname. Notable people with the surname include:

- Gail Koziara Boudreaux (born 1960), American businesswoman
- Ian Koziara, American operatic tenor
