= Benno Ziegler =

German opera singer

Benno Ziegler (8 January 1887 – 18 April 1963) was a German operatic baritone.

== Life ==
Born in Munich the son of the opera singer Wilhelm Ziegler (1857-1931), Ziegler studied at the University of Music and Performing Arts Munich. One teacher there was the Kammersinger Paul Bender. He had his debut in 1909 as Silvio in Pagliacci at the Theater Augsburg. Further engagements took him to Dortmund, Stuttgart, Karlsruhe and Berlin and in 1925 he was engaged as a lyricist and baritone at the Oper Frankfurt. With the soprano Else Gentner-Fischer, who was married to him in a second marriage, he appeared there on the 1 January 1925. In February 1930 she appeared in the role of the spouse in the world premiere of Arnold Schönberg's Von heute auf morgen, directed by Herbert Graf and conducted by William Steinberg. Ziegler was dismissed from the city stage for racist reasons in 1933 after the transfer of power to the National Socialists. Else Ziegler's engagement in Frankfurt was also terminated in 1935 because of her marriage to a non-Aryan, so that she lived in complete seclusion in Prien am Chiemsee and died there in 1943. Ziegler took himself to safety in Great Britain in 1939, where he had to make his living as an unskilled worker.

Ziegler owned a property in Karlsruhe, which had been administered by his brother Edmund (1879-1943) until the Aryanization. Edmund was deported to Gurs in 1940 Wagner-Bürckel-Aktion and killed in 1943 in the Majdanek concentration camp. His nephew Paul-Alexander (1924-2009) was saved in 1939 by the penultimate kindertransport to England.

After the war Ziegler returned to Germany in 1947 and lived in Prien and Munich.

Today Ziegler is represented in editions of historical recordings by Lotte Lehmann, Richard Tauber, Elisabeth Rethberg, Sabine Kalter, Emmy Bettendorf and Karin Branzell.
