= Emmy Bettendorf =

German operatic soprano

External audio
- Shellac recordings with Emmy Bettendorf in the Online Archive of the Österreichische Mediathek

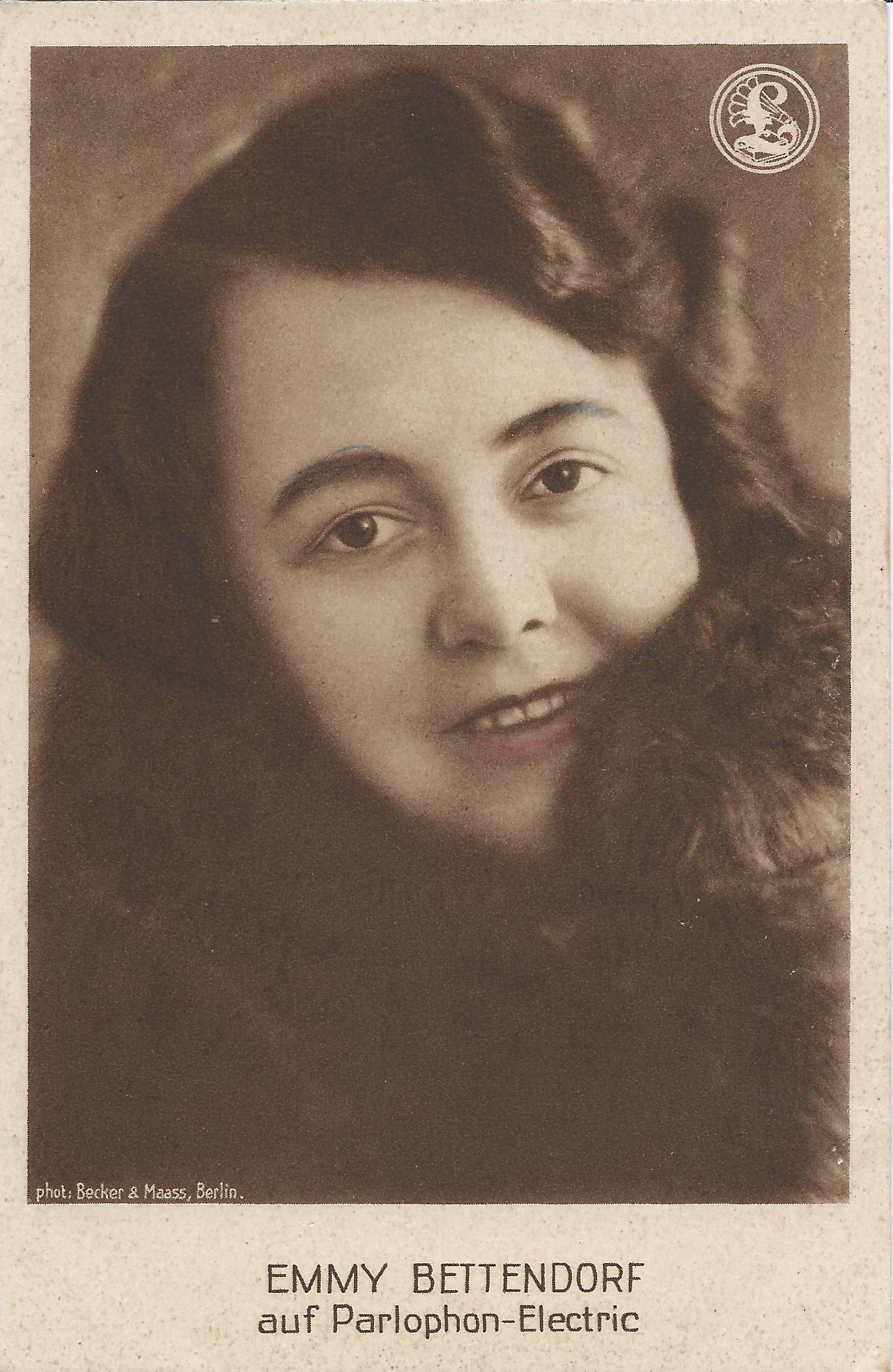
Emmy Bettendorf in 1928 by Becker & Maass

Emmy Bettendorf (16 July 1895 – 20 October 1963) was a German operatic soprano.

== Life ==
Born in Frankfurt, Bettendorf felt attracted to a career as a singer at an early age. At the age of 14 she sang for the first time at the Oper Frankfurt. At the age of 19 she received a two-year contract there in 1914 and made her debut in Das Nachtlager von Granada by Conradin Kreutzer. In 1916 she moved to Schwerin before she went to Berlin in 1920. There she was engaged at the Berlin State Opera from 1920 to 1924, and afterwards at the Deutsche Oper Berlin.

The singer expanded her repertoire in all directions, singing famous roles as both a lyrical and lyric-dramatic soprano. Guest performances with Bronsgeest's touring opera made her famous in Holland, Spain and all over Germany. But already in 1928 an illness put an end to her opera career. After that she only appeared in concerts (until 1934) and sang for recordings. This, however, with an extraordinarily large response. She belonged to the most successful Schellackplatte stars of the 1930s and left more than 300 recordings.

Bettendorf married in 1931 and lived in Austria ever since. After the death of her husband in 1938, she was in such a bad financial situation that she had to give concerts again. So it came to the Truppenbetreuung, in the context of which she gave concerts in Poland, Russia, Greece and Albania in front of German soldiers. With the money she earned she ran a boarding house for foreigners in Garmisch. Finally, the bassist Michael Bohnen brought her to the Berlin Musikhochschule as a singing teacher. There and at the Berlin Conservatory (today both united in the Berlin University of the Arts) she taught until 1952. The once so celebrated singer spent her last years sick and lonely in Berlin at age 68.

The artist's voice has been handed down through recordings, some of which are still available today as CD or MP3 downloads.

== Roles ==
- Giuseppe Verdi: Un ballo in maschera: Amelia
- Giuseppe Verdi: Don Carlos: Elisabeth
- Giuseppe Verdi: Il trovatore: Leonora
- Giacomo Puccini: Tosca: Tosca
- Wolfgang Amadeus Mozart: The Marriage of Figaro: Gräfin
- Wolfgang Amadeus Mozart: Don Giovanni: Donna Anna
- Carl Maria von Weber: Der Freischütz: Agathe
- Richard Wagner: Siegfried: Brünnhilde
- Richard Wagner: Die Meistersinger von Nürnberg: Eva
- Richard Wagner: Der Fliegende Holländer: Senta
- Richard Wagner: Tannhäuser: Elisabeth
- Richard Strauss: Der Rosenkavalier: Marschallin
- Pietro Mascagni: Cavalleria rusticana: Santuzza

== Discography ==
- Lebendige Vergangenheit - Four German Sopranos Of The Past (CD). Margarete Bäumer, Emmy Bettendorf, Käthe Heidersbach, Else Gentner-Fischer, Preiser/Naxos, Vienna 1998
- ABC der Gesangskunst. Historisches Gesangslexikon Teil 1 (Doppel-CD), Cantus-Line DA-Music, Diepholz 2002
- The Lighter Side of Emmy. Emmy Bettendorf (CD), Harmonia Mundi/Dutton lab, Arles 2005
- Lebendige Vergangenheit – Emmy Bettendorf (CD), Preiser/Naxos, Vienna 2007
