= Karl Gentner =

German opera singer (1876–1922)

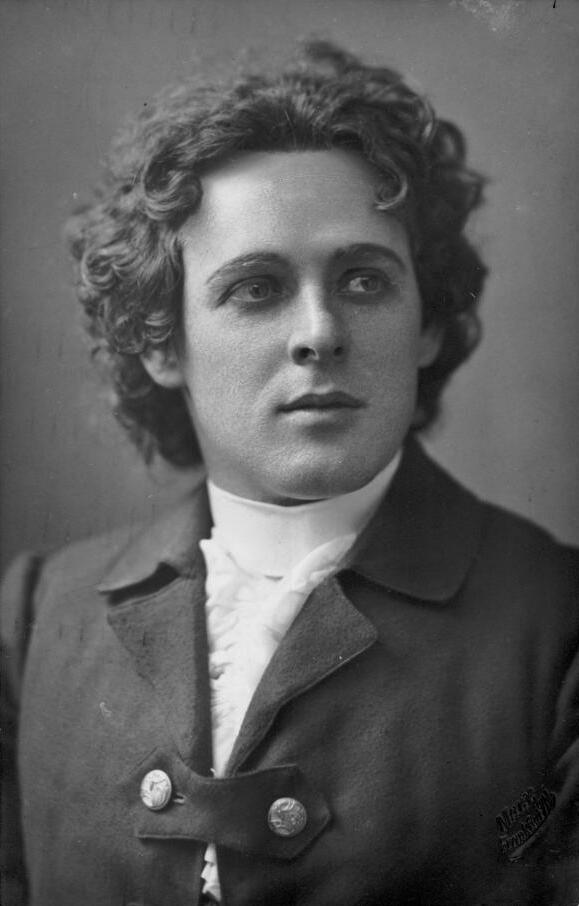
Karl Gentner, 1911

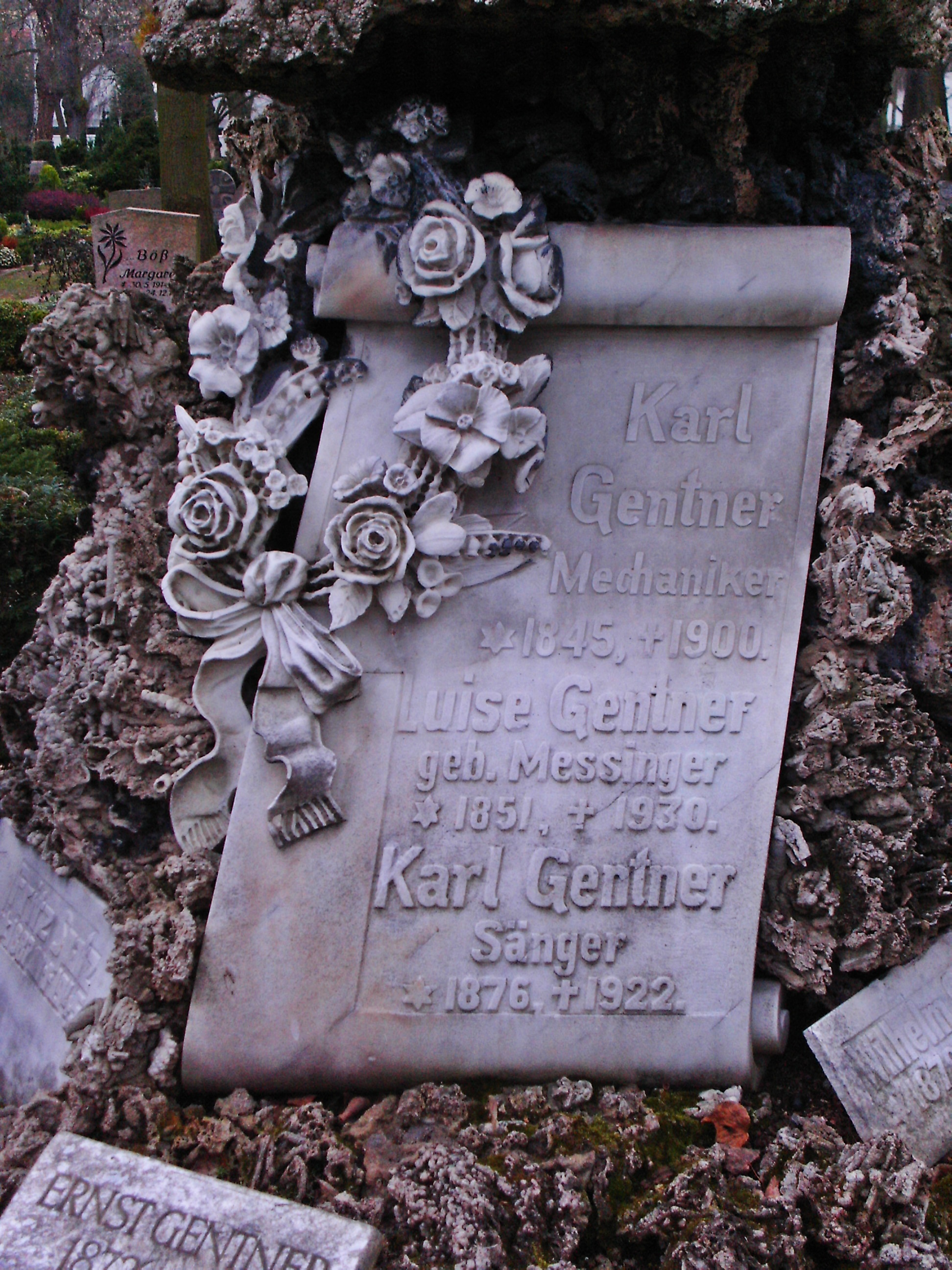
Grave inscription of the singer, on the main cemetery Frankenthal (Pfalz)

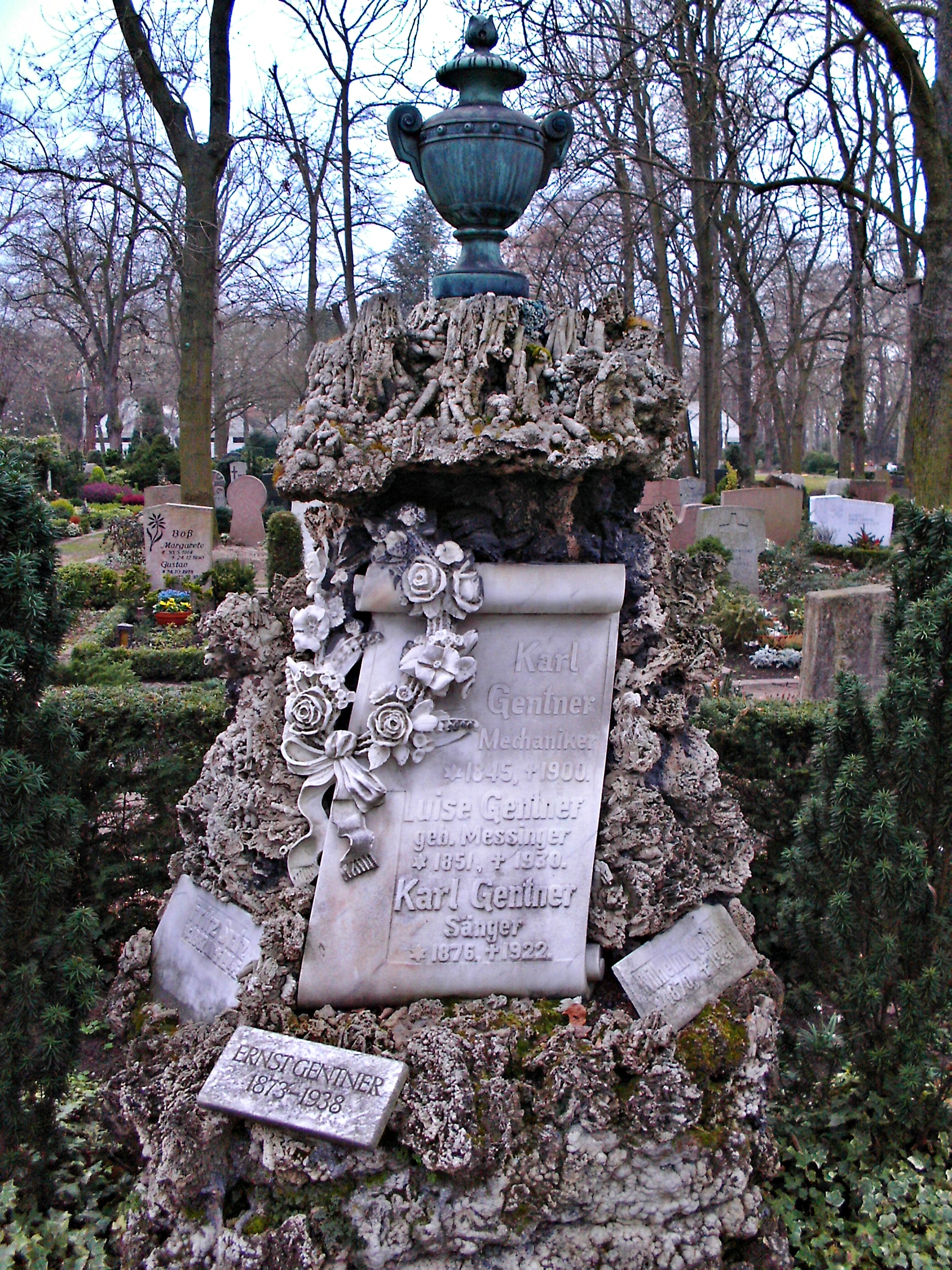
Family grave Gentner, main cemetery Frankenthal

Karl Friedrich Gentner (23 May 1876 – 13 September 1922) was a German operatic tenor.

== Life ==
Gentner was born into a family of mechanic Karl Gentner (1845-1900) and his wife Luise née Messinger (1851-1930) in Frankenthal, then a Bavarian Rhine District. In 1899, the father applied for a technical patent in the USA for a simple but efficient ground anchoring system for electric poles.

Gentner became a well-known opera singer. In 1905 he married the soprano Else Fischer (1883-1943), who was later known as Else Gentner-Fischer, one of the most important dramatic sopranos in Germany.

In 1906 the Frankfurt director Emil Claar [de] appointed the singer couple to the Oper Frankfurt. While his wife remained employed there throughout her life, Gentner moved to the Deutsche Oper Berlin-Charlottenburg in 1914, where he was engaged until his death.

After his death in Berlin at age 46, the singer's body was transferred to his birthplace and buried there in the family's grave. The grave still exists today (as of 2012) at the main cemetery Frankenthal. His wife later married the baritone, Benno Ziegler.

At the premiere of Franz Schreker's opera Der ferne Klang, 1912 in Frankfurt, Gentner played and sang the leading role of Fritz. The Austrian composer Alexander von Zemlinsky described Gentner as "a great talent".
