= Lola Beeth =

Austrian singer (1861–1940)

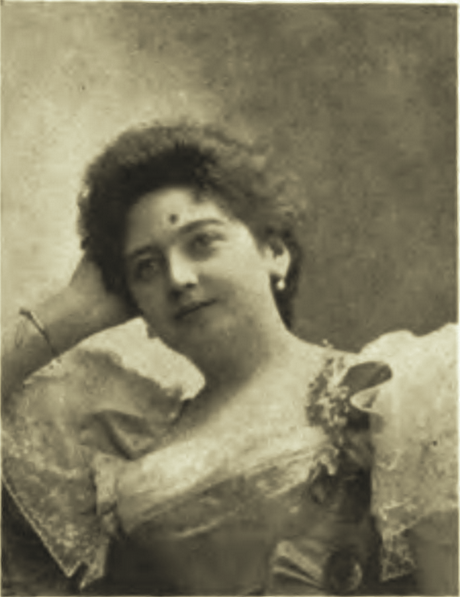

Background information
- Born: 23 November 1860; Kraków
- Died: 18 March 1940 (aged 78) Berlin
- Occupation: operatic soprano

Lola Beeth (23 November 1860 – 18 March 1940) was an Austrian operatic soprano, born in Kraków.

== Biography ==
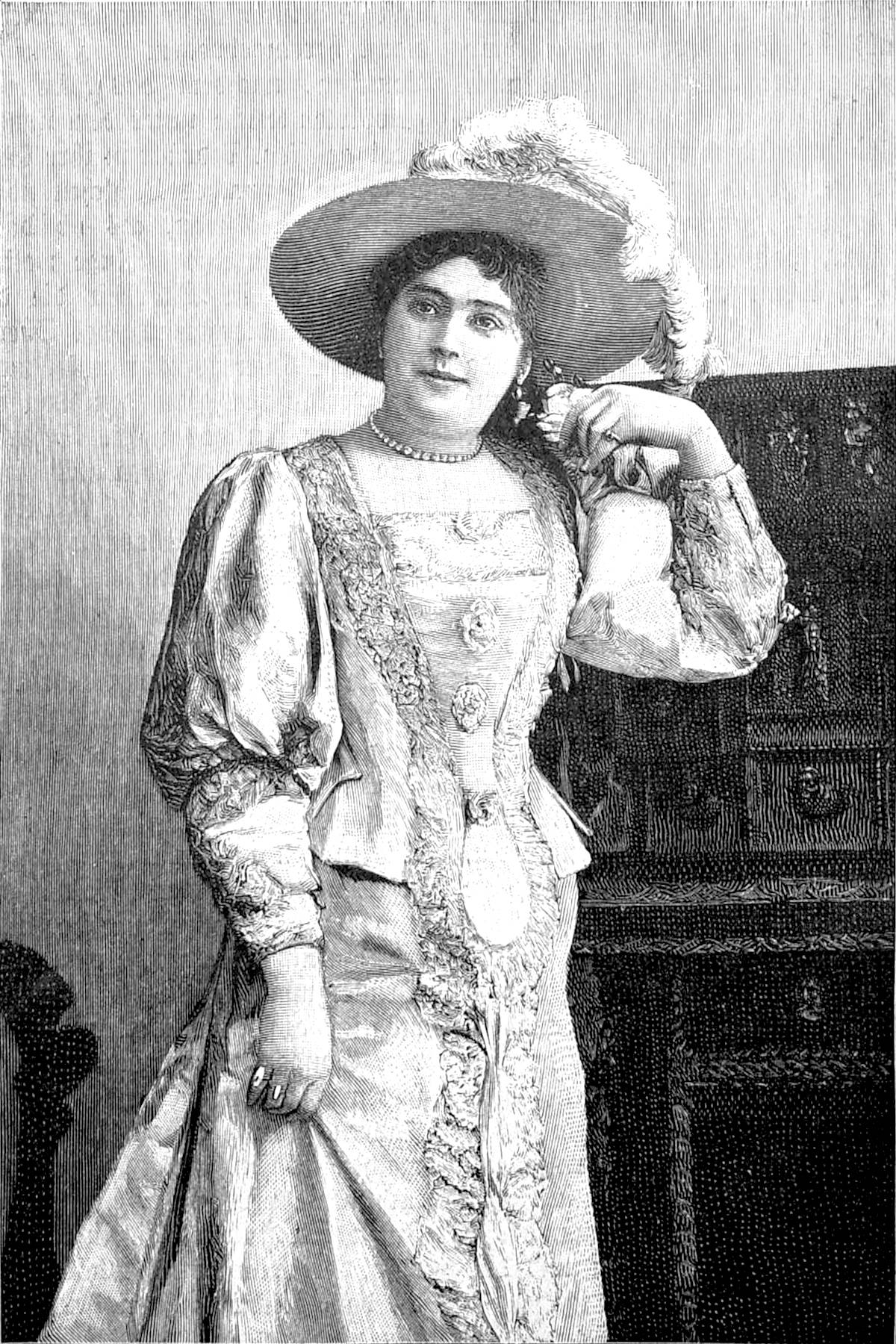
Lola Beeth in Der Trompeter von Säckingen, 1893

Lola Beeth was born on 23 November 1860 in Kraków. She started training as a singer in Lviv, then continued her education with Luise Meyer-Dustmann in Vienna. She also studied with Pauline Viardot-Garcia in Paris, Francesco Lamperti in Milan, and Rosa de Ruda in Berlin. She was a favorite pupil of Mathilde Marchesi, who tutored her in singing in Paris.

Beeth made her professional opera debut at the Berlin Hofoper (BH) as Elsa in Lohengrin in 1882; remaining a resident artist at that theatre until 1888. There she was particularly admired for her performances in the operas of Richard Wagner in partnership with the tenor Albert Niemann. In 1886 she performed in the world premiere of Heinrich Hofmann's Donna Diana at the BH. From 1888 to 1895 she was a prima donna of the Vienna Hofoper. At this theatre she expanded into the coloratura soprano repertoire; taking on parts like Marguerite in Gounod's Faust and Juliette in Gounod's Roméo et Juliette.

In 1892 and 1895 Beeth performed as a guest artist at the Paris Opera in Wagner roles like Venus in Tannhäuser and Elsa. She also sang Elsa for her debut at the Metropolitan Opera House, on 2 December 1895 with Jean de Reszke as Lohengrin. Her New York City performance was hampered by nervousness and having never sung the role in the Italian. She sang eight more roles at the Met during the 1895-1896 season. These included Elisabeth in Tannhäuser, Eva in Die Meistersinger von Nürnberg, Marguerite in Faust, Micaëla in Bizet's Carmen, Nannetta in Falstaff Nedda in Pagliacci, and Sieglinde in Die Walküre. She also sang an aria from La Juive (The Jewess) at the Metropolitan Opera House on 11 January 1896.

In 1896 Beeth performed Sieglinde at the Royal Opera House in London; performing Wagner's Die Walküre in French. From 1898 to 1901 she was once again committed to the Vieena Hofoper. She sang as a guest at many other European opera houses. In her later live she worked as a voice teacher in Berlin. One of her students was soprano Käthe Heidersbach.

Beeth died in 1940, in Berlin, aged 78.
