= Frankenthal =

Frankenthal (Pfalz)
- Town
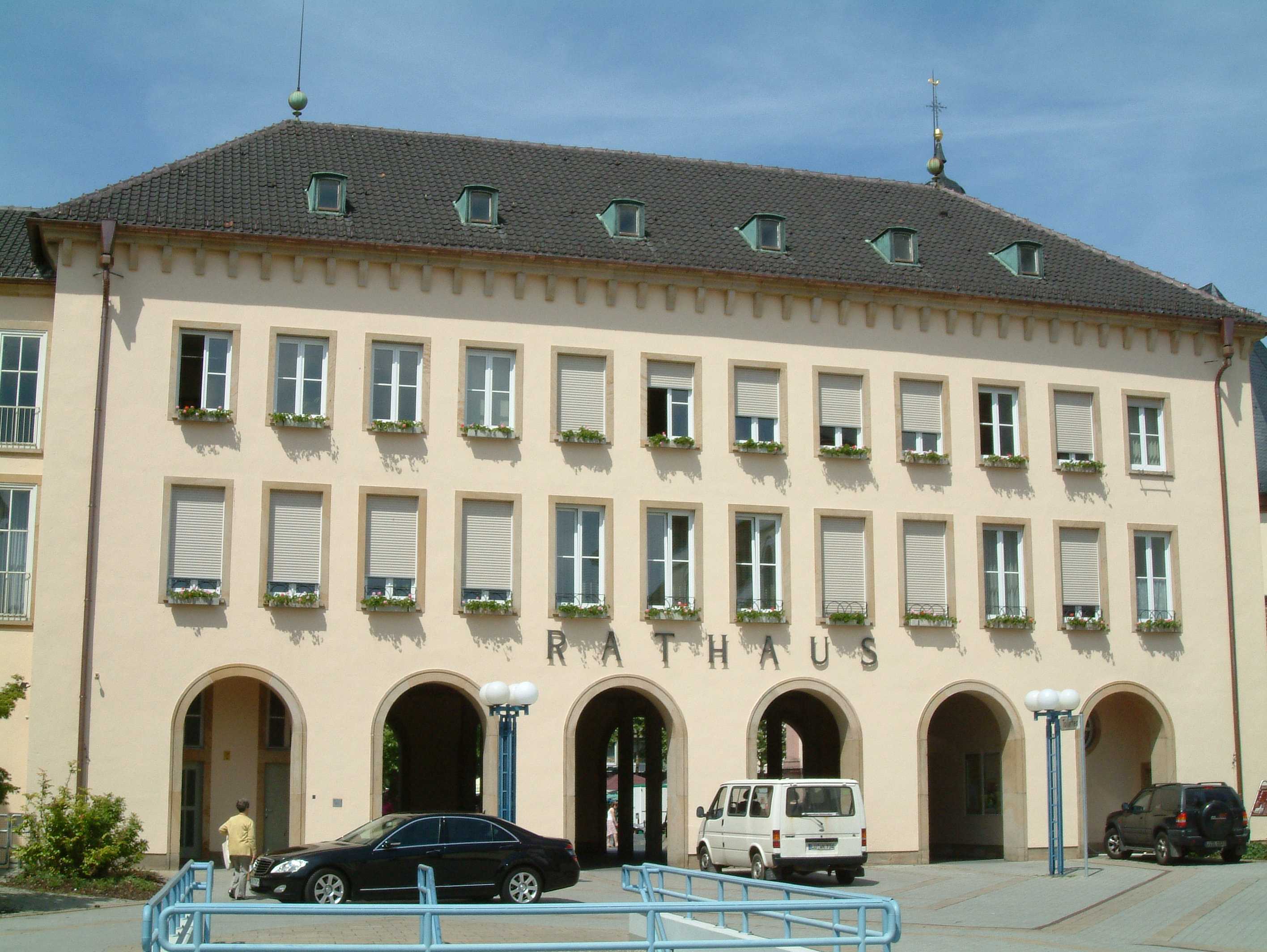
- Town hall

- Flag Coat of arms

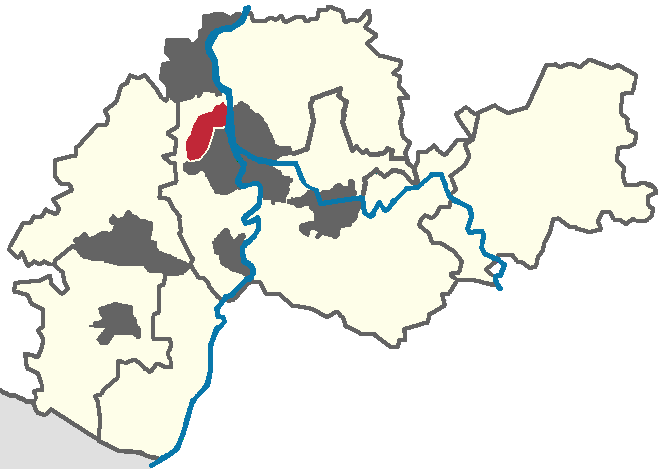
- Frankenthal (red) in the Rhein-Neckar region
- Interactive map of Frankenthal (Pfalz)
- Location within Germany Location within Rhineland-Palatinate
- Coordinates: 49°32′N 8°21′E
- Country: Germany
- State: Rhineland-Palatinate
- District: urban district

Government
  - Mayor (2024—32): Nicolas Meyer

Area
  - Total: 43.88 km^{2} (16.94 sq mi)
- Elevation: 96 m (315 ft)

Population (2025-12-31)
  - Total: 48,134
  - Density: 1,097/km^{2} (2,841/sq mi)
- Time zone: UTC+01:00 (CET)
  - Summer (DST): UTC+02:00 (CEST)
- Postal codes: 67227
- Dialling codes: 06233
- Vehicle registration: FT
- Website: frankenthal.de

Frankenthal (Pfalz) (German pronunciation: [ˈfʁaŋkn̩taːl]; Palatine German: Frongedahl) is a town in southwestern Germany, in the state of Rhineland-Palatinate.

== History ==
Frankenthal was first mentioned in 772. In 1119 an Augustinian monastery was built here, the ruins of which — known, after the founder, as the Erkenbertruine — still stand today in the town centre.

In the second half of the 16th century, people from Flanders, persecuted for their religious beliefs, settled in Frankenthal. They were industrious and artistic and brought economic prosperity to the town. Some of them were important carpet weavers, jewellers and artists whose Frankenthaler Malerschule ("Frankenthal school of painting") acquired some fame. In 1577, the settlement was raised to the status of a city by the Count Palatine Johann Casimir.

In 1600, Frankenthal was converted into a fortress. In 1621, it was garrisoned by English soldiers under Sir Horace Vere and besieged by the Spanish during the Thirty Years' War, and then successively occupied by troops of the opposing sides. Trade and industry were ruined and the town was not reconstructed until 1682.

In 1689, the town was burnt to the ground by French troops in the War of the Grand Alliance. The town did not fully recover from this for more than fifty years.

However, in 1750, under the rule of the Elector (Kurfürst) Charles Theodore, Frankenthal was established as a centre of industry. To establish trade, a port was built between 1772 and 1781, numerous factories were opened and mulberry trees were planted for silk production. In 1755, the famous Frankenthal porcelain factory was opened, which remained in production until 1800. During this period, the town was also known in English as Frankendal.

In 1797, the town came under French occupation during the French Revolutionary Wars. It passed into the rule of Bavaria in 1816. The beginning of modern industrialisation is dated from 1859. In 1938, the Jewish synagogue, built in 1884, was burnt to the ground during the Kristallnacht.

In 1943, during a bombing raid, the centre of the town was almost destroyed. In 1945, at the end of World War II, its industries in ruins, it was occupied first by the Americans and then by the French. Since 1946, Frankenthal has been part of the federal state of Rhineland-Palatinate. Today the town is again the site of some medium-sized industries.

== Number of inhabitants ==
- 1850: 4,767
- 1900: 16,899
- 2000: around 50,000
- 2015: 48,363
- 2022: 49,051

== Lord Mayors ==
- 1921–1933: Hermann Strasser
- 1942-1945: Hieronymus Merkle (NSDAP)
- 1945: Hermann Strasser
- 1946–1947: Karl Zimmermann (SPD)
- 1947–1948: Karl Breyer (SPD)
- 1949: Adam Kroll (CDU)
- 1949–1959: Emil Kraus
- 1959–1964: Jürgen Hahn (SPD)
- 1964–1972: Berno Zeißler (SPD)
- 1972–1983: Günter Kahlberg (CDU)
- 1984–1989: Jochen Riebel (CDU)
- 1990–1999: Peter Popitz (SPD)
- 2000–2015: Theo Wieder (CDU)
- 2015–2023: Martin Hebich (CDU)
- since 2024: Dr. Nicolas Meyer (FWG)

== Twin towns – sister cities ==
Frankenthal is twinned with:

- Colombes, France (1958)
- Rosolini, Italy (2018)
- Sopot, Poland (1991)
- Strausberg, Germany (1990)

Since 1982, Frankenthal has also cooperated with the community of Butamwa in Nyarugenge, Rwanda.

== Notable people ==
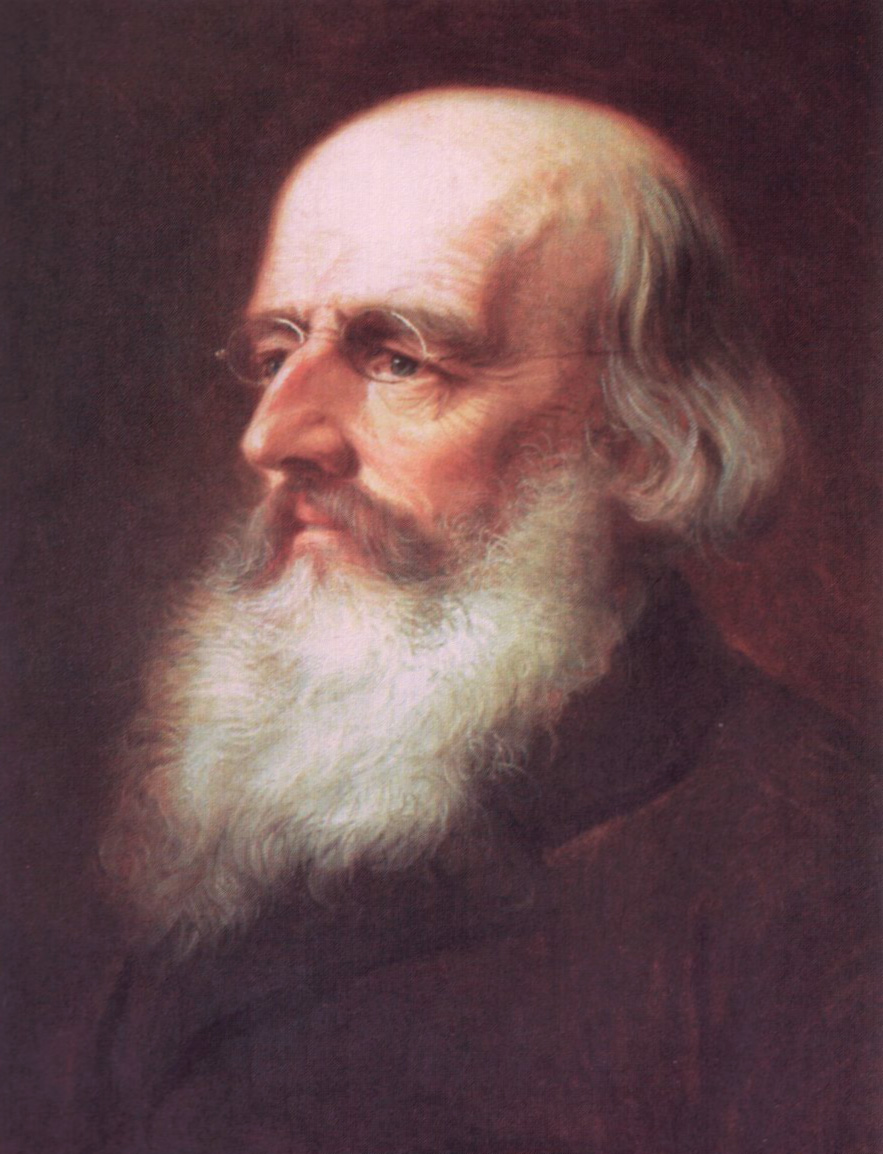
Konrad Maurer in 1876

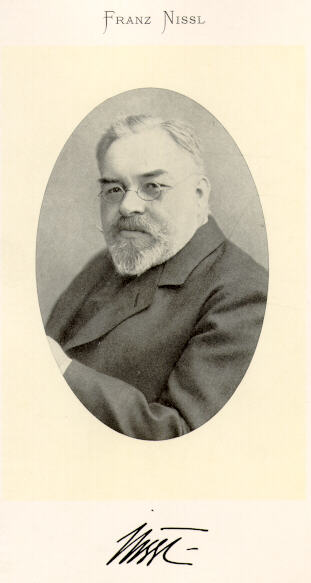
Franz Nissl

- Abraham Heidanus (1597–1678), a reformed theologian
- Esther Moscherosch née Ackermann (1602–1632), wife of the statesman and baroque poet Johann Michael Moscherosch
- Jacob Marrel (1614–1681), still life painter
- Johann Philipp Becker (1809–1886), revolutionary
- Georg Vierling (1820–1901), composer (dedication of the Vierlingstrasse )
- Konrad Maurer (1823–1902), a Bavarian legal historian
- Julius von Michel (1843–1911), ophthalmologist
- Richard Reverdy (1851–1915), civil engineer
- Karl Wendling (1857–1918), pianist and music pedagogue
- Karl Perron (1858–1928), opera singer
- Franz Nissl (1860–1919), neurologist and psychiatrist
- August von Parseval (1861–1942), designer of airships (dedication of the Parsevalplatz)
- Hermann Wilker (1874–1941), rower
- Karl Gentner (1876–1922), operatic tenor
- Oskar Perron (1880–1975), mathematician
- Ludwig Marum (1882–1934), lawyer and politician, a victim of the Holocaust
- Arnold Fanck (1889–1974), director and pioneer of the mountain film
- Paul Martini (1889–1964), medical doctor
- Georg Gehring (1903–1943), wrestler
- Werner Knab (1908–1945), jurist and SS leader
- Hans Carste (1909–1971), composer and conductor
- Adolf Metzner (1910–1978), Leichtathlet
- Michael Werner (publisher) (born 1965), founder of the Pennsylvania German newspaper Hiwwe wie Driwwe

== Family name ==
The family name "Frankenthal" is attested among people scattered in many countries - especially among Jews - and indicates an ultimate origin of the family in the town, though it might be centuries old and leaving no memory other than the name.

== Gallery ==
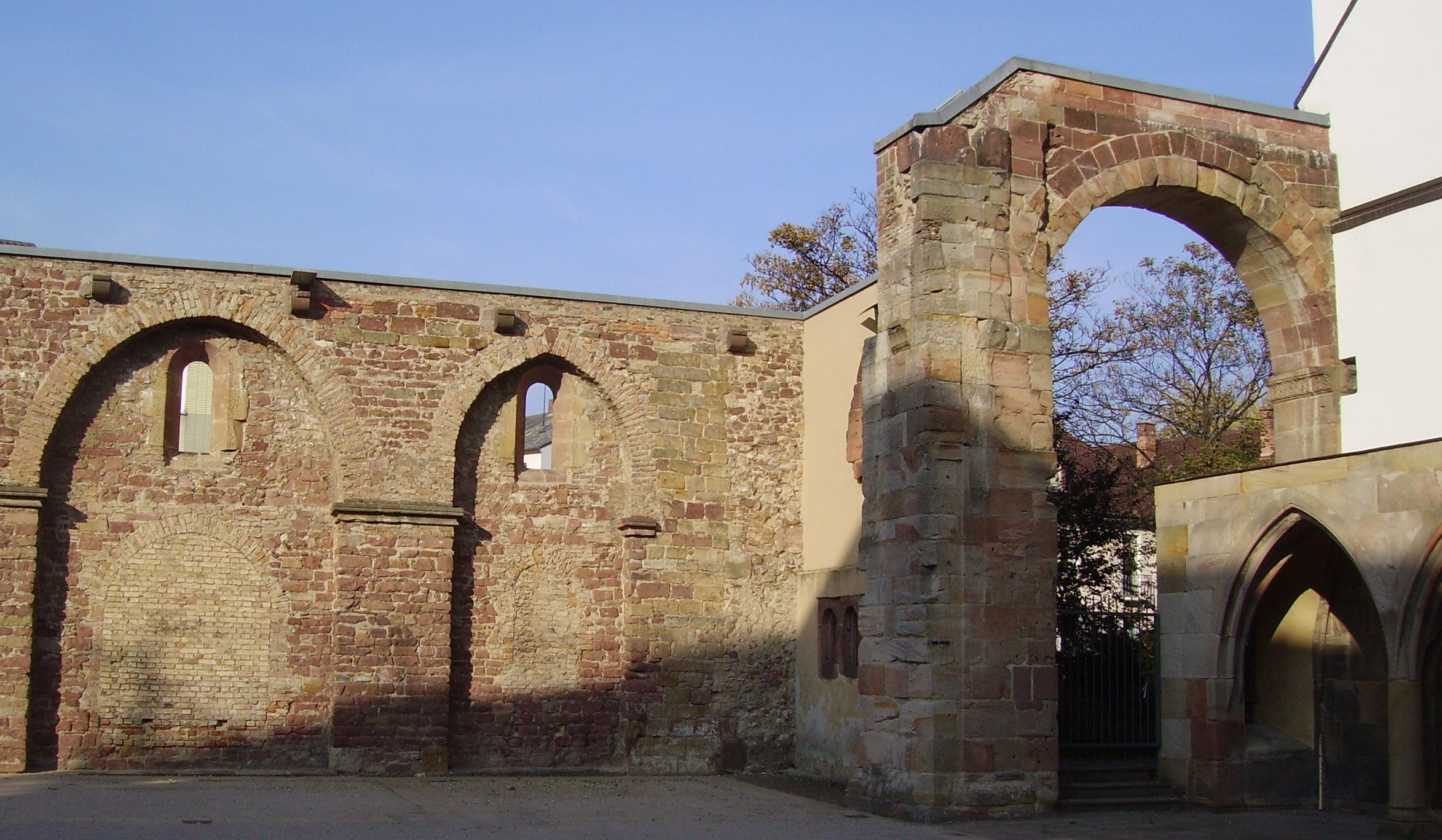
Ruins of the monastery

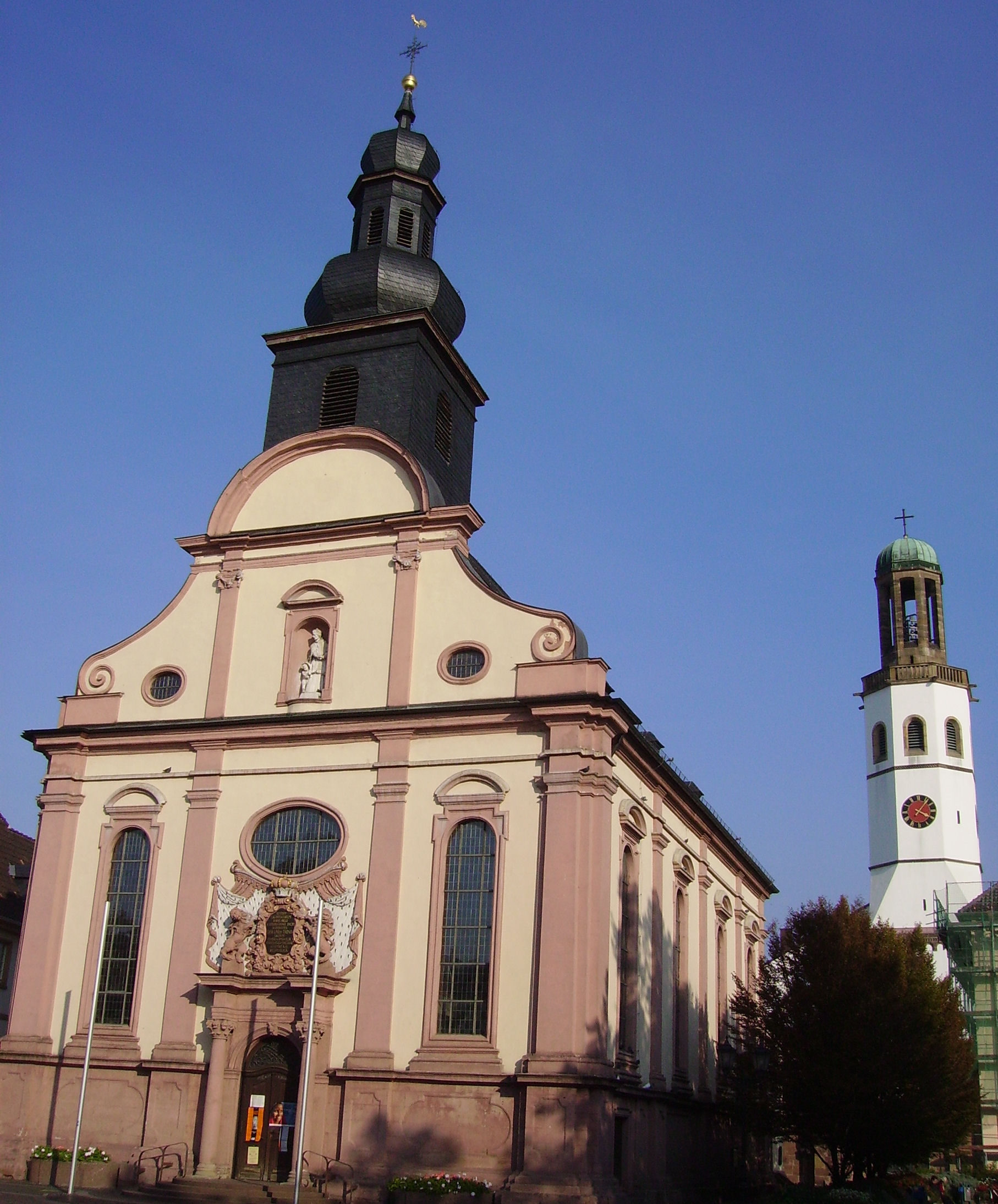
The two churches in the centre

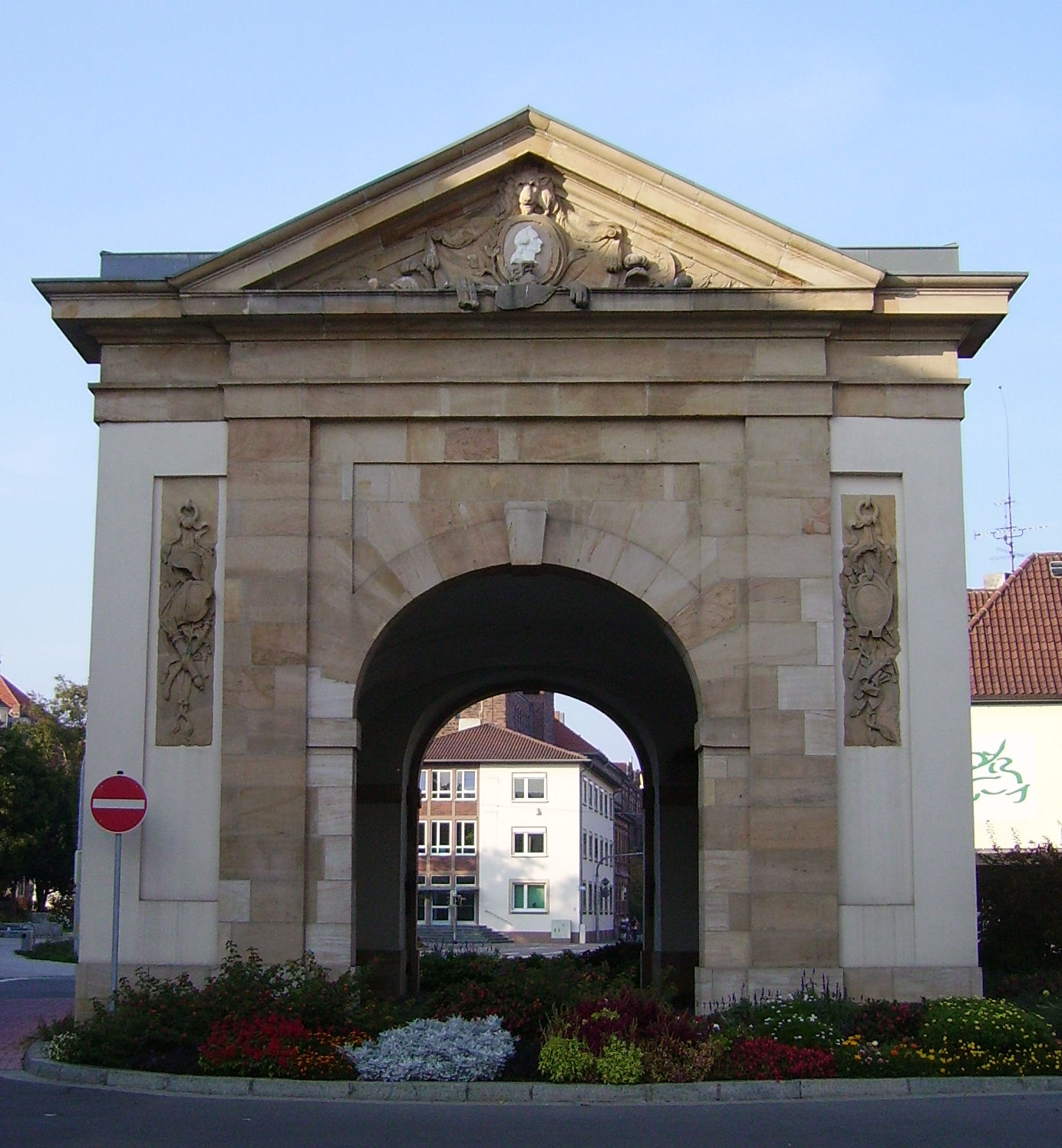
Wormser Tor

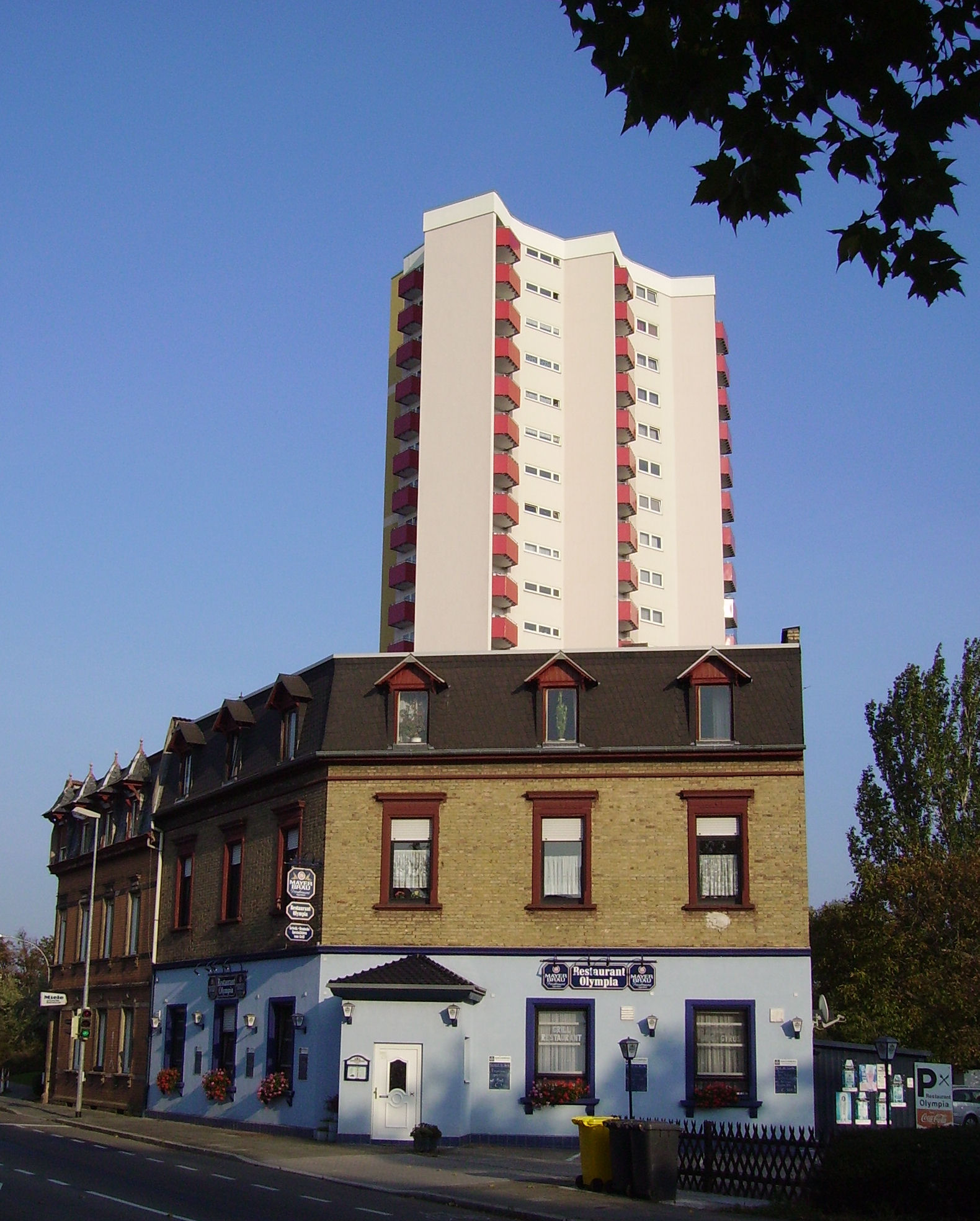
Outskirts

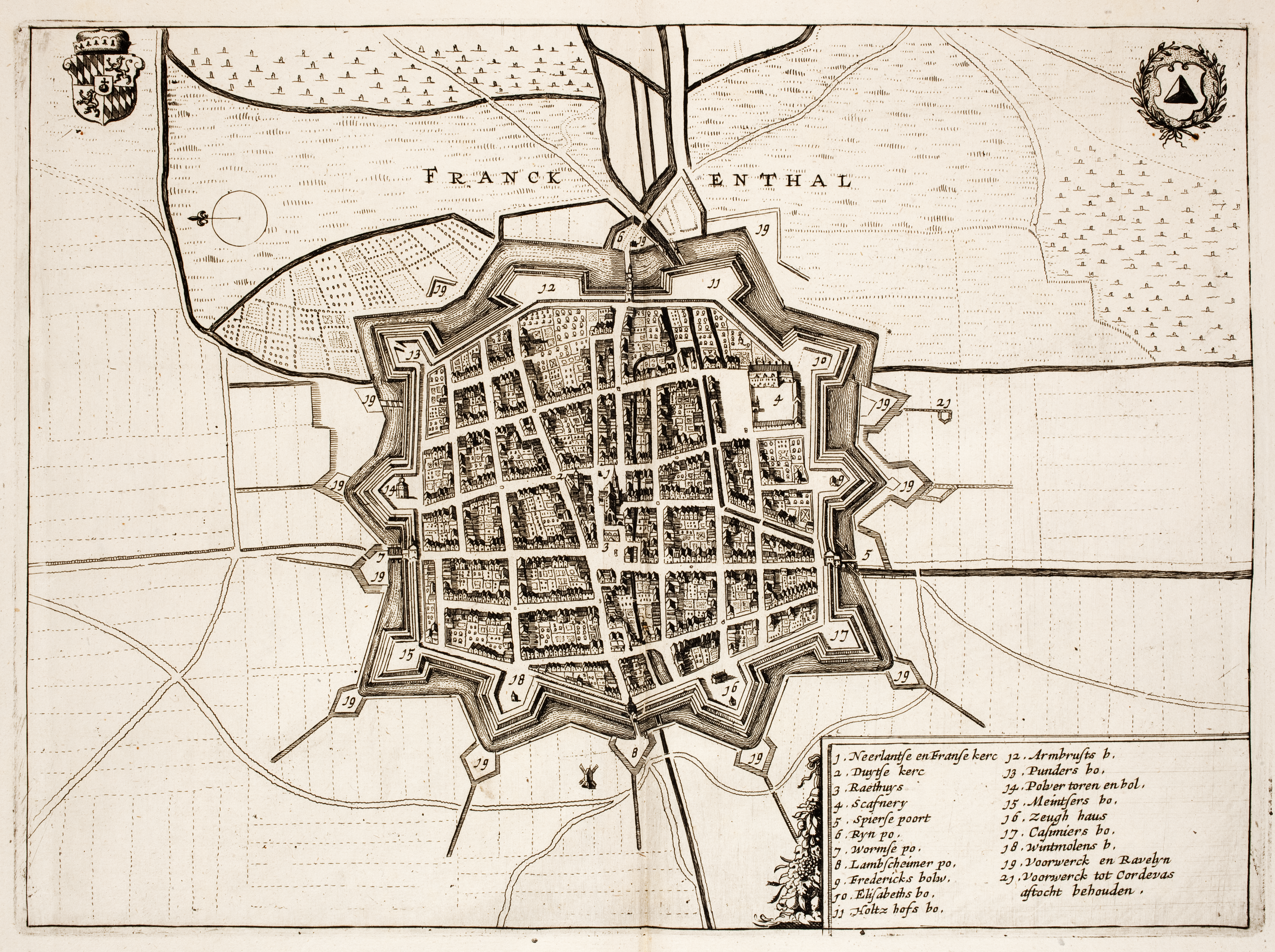
Fortress Franckenthal
