= Von heute auf morgen =

German operatic comedy

- Opera by Arnold Schoenberg
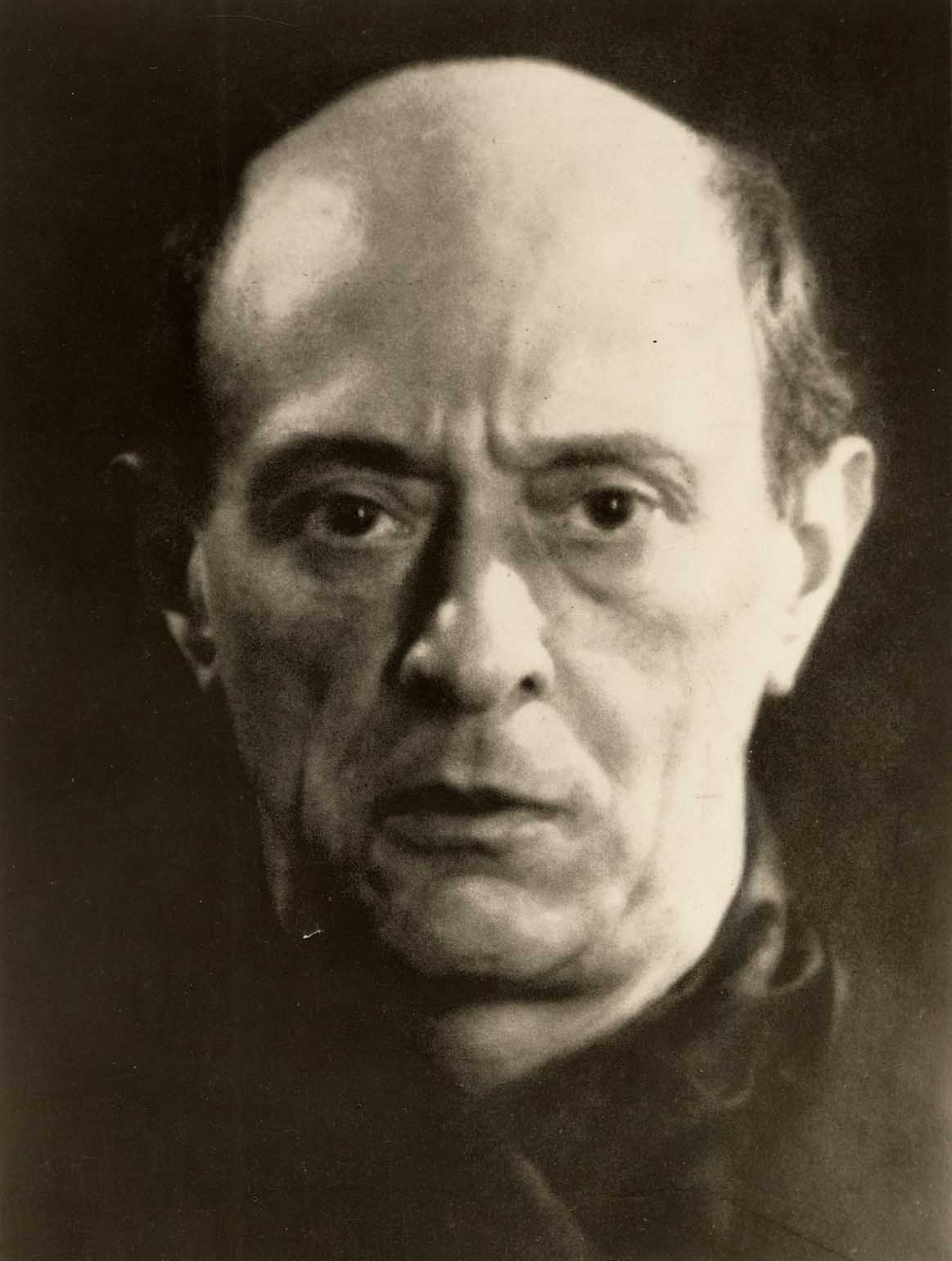
- The composer in 1927
- Translation: From Today to Tomorrow
- Librettist: Max Blonda
- Language: German
- Premiere: 1 February 1930; Oper Frankfurt

Von heute auf morgen (From Today to Tomorrow or From One Day to the Next) is a one-act opera composed by Arnold Schoenberg, to a German libretto by "Max Blonda", the pseudonym of Gertrud Schoenberg, the composer's wife. It is the composer's opus 32.

The opera was composed at the end of 1928 (finished on the first day of 1929), and was premiered at the Oper Frankfurt on 1 February 1930, with William Steinberg conducting Herbert Graf's production. It was the first twelve-tone opera, and Schoenberg's only comedy. The libretto may indeed be a contemporary comedy of manners, but the music is complex, the angular vocal-lines and large orchestra creating a frightening whirlwind of fury. Schoenberg wrote: "I have proved in my operas Von heute auf morgen and Moses und Aron that every expression and characterization can be produced with the style of free dissonance."

== Performance history ==
In 1930, after the Frankfurt premiere, the composer himself conducted a radio broadcast performance in Berlin. After that, the opera was never performed again during Schoenberg's lifetime. Recent revivals include performances at the Leipzig Opera in 2008 and the Tyrolean State Theatre in 2025.

== Roles ==
Roles, voice types, premiere cast
Role	Voice type	Premiere cast, 1 February 1930 (Conductor: William Steinberg)
Die Frau / The Wife	soprano	Else Gentner-Fischer
Die Freundin / The Friend	soprano	Elisabeth Friedrich
Der Sänger / The Singer	tenor	Anton Maria Topitz
Der Mann / The Husband	baritone	Benno Ziegler
Das Kind / The Child	speaking role	

== Synopsis ==
Place: A modern living room/bedroom.

The husband and wife have returned from an evening out and recall the earlier flirtations of the night. During the conversation, the wife gradually changes into a lovely negligee. Their small child interrupts, and is put back to bed. The singer, from earlier in the evening, telephones, making the husband jealous. The wife changes into a cocktail dress, then back into the simple house-dress seen at the start of the opera.

In the morning, the singer and the friend arrive for an early visit, and are served coffee. They champion all the latest trends in society. When they leave, the husband and wife realize, over breakfast, that their own relationship is based on love, not the mere latest fashion.

== Instrumentation ==
The score calls for: 2 flutes, 2 oboes, 4 clarinets, 2 bassoons, 3 saxophones, 2 horns, 2 trumpets, 3 trombones, tuba, percussion, mandolin, guitar, harp, piano, celesta, and strings.

A performance lasts for about one hour. It contains music for flexatone.

== Recordings ==
- Robert Craft conducting the Royal Philharmonic Orchestra, with sopranos Erika Schmidt and Heather Harper, tenor Herbert Schachtschneider and baritone Derrik Olsen. Recorded 1964. Released 1971 by Columbia Records.
- Michael Gielen conducting the Radio-Sinfonie-Orchester Frankfurt, with sopranos Christine Whittlesey and Claudia Barainsky, tenor Ryszard Karczykowski and baritone Richard Salter. Recorded October 1996. Released 1997 by cpo.

== Films ==
The 1996 recording was the basis for a film version (Du jour au lendemain) directed by the French filmmaking duo of Daniele Huillet and Jean-Marie Straub. Photographed on a stage in black-and-white (with a pre-credits sequence showing the orchestra tuning up), the film was one of three films by Straub and Huillet based on Schoenberg works. Earlier, they had directed a film version of his unfinished opera Moses und Aron.
