= Jennifer Holloway =

American mezzo-soprano and soprano

- Born: 1978 (age 47–48); Ohio, U.S.
- Education: University of Georgia; Manhattan School of Music
- Occupations: Operatic mezzo-soprano; Operatic soprano
- Website: www.jennholloway.com

Jennifer Holloway (born 1978) is an American operatic mezzo-soprano and soprano who has made an international career performing at leading opera houses and festivals. She began as a mezzo-soprano singing roles such as Adalgisa in Bellini's Norma, and moved to soprano roles such as Salome and Grete Graumann in Schreker's Der ferne Klang.

== Career ==
Holloway was born in Ohio. She studied voice at the University of Georgia and the Manhattan School of Music. In 2005, she won first prize at the Georgia region of the Metropolitan Opera National Council Auditions. In 2006, she won Fort Worth Opera's McCammon Competition.

Holloway achieved international recognition when she appeared at the Santa Fe Opera in 2006 as Le Prince Charmant in Massenet's Cendrillon alongside Joyce DiDonato as Cinderella. She made her debut with the Metropolitan Opera in the 2010/11 season as Flora in Verdi's La traviata and returned in the 2012/13 season as Tebaldo in his Don Carlos. She appeared at the Israeli Opera as Adalgisa in Bellini's Norma.

She first performed the title role of Salome by Richard Strauss at the Semperoper, where she also appeared as Cassandre in Les Troyens by Berlioz in the 2017/18 season. She first performed the role of Sieglinde in Wagner's Die Walküre at the Hamburg State Opera.

In 2018, she appeared as Donna Elvira in Mozart's Don Giovanni in an open air performance of the broadcaster NDR in Hanover. In 2019, she appeared as Grete Graumann in Franz Schreker's Der ferne Klang at the Oper Frankfurt, where the opera had received its world premiere in 1912 as the composer's breakthrough. In a staging by Damiano Michieletto, she portrayed the main character at three stages of life: as a young girl whose lover, the composer Fritz sung by Ian Koziara, leaves her in search of a distant sound, as a queen of the demimonde, and as an old woman who is finally reunited with her lover, only to have him die in her arms. A reviewer noted her sensitive acting in all stages of the main character's life, with a brilliantly high register and at the same time a lyrical warm timbre ("in der Höhe strahlenden wie lyrisch warmem Sopran").

In concert in 2012, she sang the world premiere of Love and a Question, a song cycle which Frédéric Chaslin had written for her.
