= Gustav Kuhn =

Austrian conductor (born 1945)

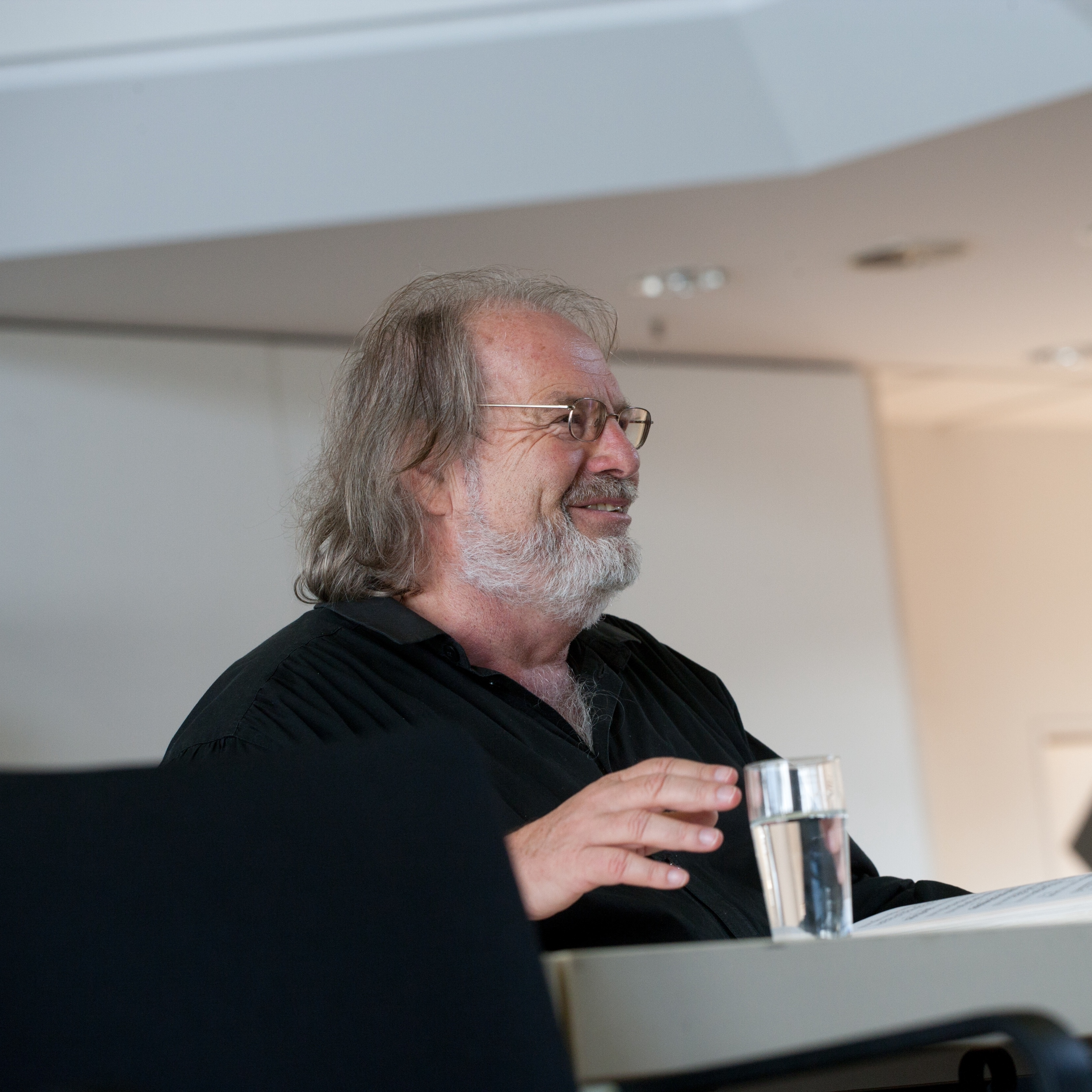
Gustav Kuhn (2012)

Gustav Kuhn (born 28 August 1945) is an Austrian conductor and manager, also a composer, and a teacher and author. During his international conducting career, he founded the later "Accademia di Montegral" for young musicians and singers in 1987, held the artistic directorship of the Tiroler Festspiele Erl, which he founded, for over 20 years and was artistic director of the international singing competition "Neue Stimmen" of the Bertelsmann Foundation since the competition was founded in 1987. Due to the accusations against Kuhn, he ended the collaboration in September 2018.

== Life ==
Born in Turrach, Styria and raised in Salzburg, Kuhn received violin and piano lessons as a child and studied conducting at the conservatories of Vienna and Salzburg with Gerhard Wimberger, Hans Swarowsky, Bruno Maderna and Herbert von Karajan. In 1970, he was awarded the Lilli Lehmann Medal at the Mozarteum University Salzburg. He was awarded a doctorate in philosophy at the University of Salzburg. At the age of 24, he won first prize in the international conducting competition of the ORF.

From 1970 to 1977, he was first choral director and conductor at the Süreyya Opera House (the "Istanbul Opera House"), then 1st Kapellmeister at the Dortmund Opera House. During this time, he made guest appearances in Palermo, Naples and Bologna, and subsequently in Rome, Florence, Venice and Zurich. Later he conducted the Berlin Philharmonic, the Dresdner Staatskapelle, the Israel Philharmonic, the London Philharmonic Orchestra and the London Symphony Orchestra, the Royal Philharmonic Orchestra, the Orchestra Filarmonica of la Scala in Milan, the Orchestre National de France in Paris, the Accademia Nazionale di Santa Cecilia in Rome as well as the NHK Symphony Orchestra in Tokyo and the Vienna Philharmonic. In 1974, he founded the Institute for Aleatoric Music in Salzburg. In 1977, he made his debut at the Vienna State Opera with Elektra by Richard Strauss, in 1978 at the Bavarian State Opera and at the Salzburg Festival. The following season, he conducted for the first time at the Royal Opera House, Covent Garden in London and in 1979 became general music director in Bern. In 1980, he conducted the opening performance at the Glyndebourne Festival Opera. In 1981, came the debut in the United States (Fidelio in Chicago), 1982 at the Paris Opera (Così fan tutte), in 1984 at Milan's La Scala (Tannhäuser) and in 1986 at the Verona Arena (Un ballo in maschera).

From 1983 to 1985, Kuhn was general music director of the Bonn Opera. In 1985, he broke with his teacher Herbert von Karajan. In the same year, Kuhn slapped the general director of the Bühnen der Stadt Bonn, Jean-Claude Riber, which caused a great stir and earned him the nickname "Watsch'n-Gustl" in the local press.

In 1986, Kuhn made his debut as an opera director (set and costumes Peter Papst) with the Flying Dutchman in Trieste, the concept of "hall-opera" was developed by him for the Suntory Hall in 1993. He conducted at the Salzburg Festival until 1997 (1989 Ballo in maschera; 1992, 1994 and 1997 La clemenza di Tito).

In 1986, he was appointed chief conductor of the Teatro dell'Opera in Rome and later artistic director of the Teatro di San Carlo in Naples. From 1990 to 1994, he was in charge of the festival at the Sferisterio in Macerata.

From 1987 to September 2018, Kuhn was artistic director of the international singing competition Neue Stimmen of the Bertelsmann Foundation in Gütersloh. In 1987, he founded an academy for young singers ("Accademia di Montegridolfo") in the small Romagna town of Montegridolfo, not far from Pesaro, where he often conducted at the Rossini Opera Festival, which he renamed "Accademia di Montegral" in 1992. Since 2000, the seat of the academy has been the Convento dell'Angelo in Lucca (Tuscany). In 1997, Kuhn founded the Tyrolean Festival Erl. After several years of working on Wagner's Ring, the Tiroler Festspiele Erl went on tour with this production for the first time in 2005 (Santander) and produced the 24-hour Ring, which became legendary. In the same year, the building contractor Hans Peter Haselsteiner took over the presidency of the Tiroler Festspiele Erl. As a sponsor, he made the construction of a new festival hall possible. Until the summer of 2012, Kuhn conducted and directed ten major Wagner operas in the Erl Passion Playhouse. The opening of the Festspielhaus took place on 26 December of the same year.

Kuhn was artistic director of the Haydn Orchestra of Bolzano and Trento from January 2003 to December 2012. In 2010, at the suggestion of Provincial Governor Durnwalder, he founded the South Tyrol Festival (Toblach/Dobbiaco), which he also directed until 2012.

His compositions include orchestral works, masses and solo pieces; his orchestration of Janáček's The Diary of One Who Disappeared at the Opéra National de Paris (published by Edition Peters) was successful. Since 2007, he has again been a regular guest with the concert series Delirium in his home town of Salzburg.

Kuhn has released recordings with the record companies col legno (of which he has been artistic director together with Andreas Schett since 2006), Sony/BMG, EMI, CBS, Capriccio, Supraphon, Orfeo, Koch/Schwann, Coreolan, ARTE NOVA. His book Aus Liebe zur Musik was published in 2000 by Henschel Verlag, Berlin.

With his wife Andrea he had a son and a daughter (born 1972, born 1980). A daughter came from a second relationship. Two further daughters were born from his relationship with the soprano Nadja Michael.

== Accademia di Montegral ==
Founded in 1987 as the "Accademia di Montegridolfo" for the purpose of training and promoting young artists and renamed the "Accademia di Montegral" in 1992 (see #Life), the academy has been based in the Convento dell'Angelo in Lucca (Tuscany) since 2000. In addition to offering workshops and preparing artistic projects, it aims to provide a comprehensive musical and cultural education. Since its opening, musical masses and concerts have been held regularly in the convent's church.

== Tiroler Festspiele Erl ==
In 1997, Kuhn founded the Tiroler Festspiele Erl, which celebrated its opening in 1998 with the performance of Das Rheingold. Since then, the stage of the Passion Playhouse, built by Robert Schuller in 1959, has been used every year. Between 1998 and 2006, Kuhn staged and conducted Wagner's Der Ring des Nibelungen, Tristan und Isolde, Parsifal and Strauss' Elektra. After the internationally acclaimed 24-hour Ring in 2005, Kuhn presented a seven-day Wagner marathon for the tenth anniversary of the Tyrolean Festival in 2007. In 2009, Beethoven's Fidelio, Elektra and Wagner's Die Meistersinger von Nürnberg were performed, followed in 2010 by Der fliegende Holländer and Die Zauberflöte, in 2011 Tannhäuser, in 2012 Lohengrin. A new festival hall was built as a second stage for the 2010-2012 Tyrolean Festival. With Puccini's Tosca, an Italian opera was performed for the first time at the Tiroler Festspiele Erl in summer 2012.

In 2012, for the opening of the Festspielhaus, Béla Bartók's Bluebeard's Castle and Mozart's The Marriage of Figaro were performed, in 2013 Puccini's Tosca and Mozart's Don Giovanni; for the 2014 winter season Fidelio, Così fan tutte and a low-budget production The Seven Deadly Sins. As the Passion Playhouse was not available in the summer of 2013, a "Verdi Summer" with Rigoletto, La traviata and Il trovatore was performed in the Festspielhaus. In autumn 2014, there was the world premiere of the opera El Juez by Christian Kolonovits, written for the comeback of Josep Carreras.

In 2018, "bad working conditions and the authoritarian behaviour" of Kuhn in Erl were denounced by the Tyrolean journalist Markus Wilhelm and plagiarism allegations raised in connection with his doctoral thesis. Both Kuhn and Haselsteiner fought back with a series of civil lawsuits.

The accusations of plagiarism led to an examination procedure by a "Commission for Ensuring Good Scientific Practice" of the University of Salzburg, which had accepted the dissertation. The commission found that Kuhn's doctoral thesis "contained plagiarised text passages in addition to technical errors". These had already been identified in two dissertation reports in 1969. However, it was not enough to deprive Kuhn of his academic title because "the plagiarised text passages are found in a part of the thesis which, according to the structure of the thesis, is of an illustrative character. Kuhn does not attempt in any way or at any point to pass these passages off as his own statements," the statement said. Rather, Kuhn had unmistakably referred to foreign thoughts. "The fact that their origin was not carefully proven in part constitutes a deficiency in craftsmanship, but does not permit a finding of intentional deception, either in itself or in context." Plagiarism researcher Stefan Weber strongly disagreed with this opinion.

In July 2018, five female musicians complained of sexual assault by Kuhn in an open letter. The assaults allegedly occurred between 1998 and 2017, when the female musicians were employed by the Tyrolean Festival Erl. Following the conclusion of the 2018 summer programme, Kuhn then suspended his position as artistic director of the festival on 31 July 2018 with immediate effect until the allegations had been fully clarified. In September 2018, he also took leave of absence as conductor in Erl, shortly before eight (male) artists and former staff members supported the authors of the open letter in a statement of solidarity on 29 September. At the same time, an extensive report appeared in the Austrian news magazine Profil, which fleshed out the accusations and provided further details on the case under the title "Comprehensive accusations against Erl artistic director Kuhn". An interview with Kuhn, in which he was again confronted with the allegations, took place on 22 October 2018 in the programme Zeit im Bild.

On 24 October 2018, it was announced that Kuhn was immediately stepping down from all his functions. In October 2018, Bernd Loebe was presented as Kuhn's successor, taking over the directorship on 1 September 2019 alongside the directorship of the Frankfurt Opera.

In November 2019, the Equal Treatment Commission of the Austrian Chancellery ruled that sexual harassment by Kuhn had undoubtedly occurred. Nevertheless, in March 2020, the investigation against Kuhn was discontinued, since in most cases "any criminally relevant conduct had already become time-barred ... or ... had not been punishable at the time of the offence in question" by the time the investigation began.

== Honours ==
In 1999, Kuhn received the Tiroler Adler-Orden, "an award of the Provincial Government for non-Tyroleans whose relationship to the Province of Tyrol is of special political, economic or cultural significance". On 9 January 2020, Culture Regional Councillor Beate Palfrader (ÖVP) made it clear "that with today's knowledge an awarding of the order would not have been an option for her." (Wording according to ORF) In the days before, the Green caucus leader Gebi Mair had pushed for a revocation procedure within the coalition. On 10 January 2020, Kuhn informed the Landesregierung Platter III by letter that he would like to return this order.
