= Ian Koziara =

American operatic tenor

- Born: Chicago, Illinois, U.S.
- Education: Lawrence University Conservatory of Music; Shepherd School of Music
- Website: www.iankoziara.com

Ian Koziara is an American operatic tenor who made an international career at major opera houses, such as the Oper Frankfurt and the Metropolitan Opera.

== Career ==
Born in Chicago, Koziara received a bachelor's degree from Lawrence University Conservatory of Music, and a master's degree from Rice University's Shepherd School of Music.

He made his debut at the Metropolitan Opera in New York City, as Enrique in The Exterminating Angel by Thomas Adès. Further roles at the house included Derek in Nico Muhly's Marnie and the Pony Express Rider in Puccini's La Fanciulla del West. These performances appeared in the live broadcasts of the opera house.

In 2018, Koziara performed the title role of Mozart's Ideomeneo with the Wolf Trap Opera. In 2019, he appeared in the leading role of Fritz in Schreker's Der ferne Klang at the Oper Frankfurt, where the work's world premiere had taken place in 1912. The production was directed by Damiano Michieletto and conducted by Sebastian Weigle, with Grete, his partner on stage, sung by Jennifer Holloway.

Koziara is also active in concert and recital. On March 10, 2018, he gave a recital at Carnegie Hall, with pianist Dimitri Dover.
