= Der ferne Klang =

Opera by Franz Schreker

- Opera by Franz Schreker
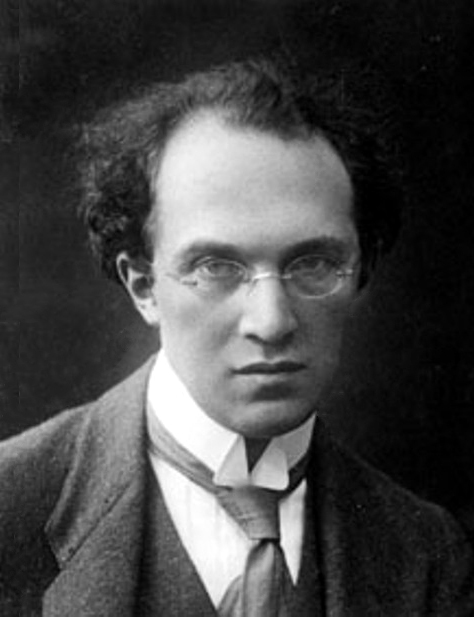
- The composer in 1912
- Translation: The Distant Sound
- Librettist: Schreker
- Language: German
- Premiere: 18 August 1912; Oper Frankfurt

Der ferne Klang (The Distant Sound) is an opera by Franz Schreker, set to his own libretto. Begun in 1903, it was first performed by the Oper Frankfurt on 18 August 1912. It was the composer's breakthrough to fame, and was frequently performed up until 1931, shortly after which the composer's music was proscribed by the Nazi regime. Largely forgotten after World War II, it has been revived by several opera companies in the 21st century.

== Composition history ==
Drafted in 1901, Schreker completed the three-act libretto in 1903. However, composing the music would take about ten years. Criticism from his composition teacher Robert Fuchs caused Schreker to abandon the project for the first time in 1903. He did not return to it until 1905, after having attended the first performances of Richard Strauss' opera Salome. The orchestral interlude of act 3 (entitled Nachtstück) was given its first concert performance by the Wiener Tonkünstler-Orchester on 25 November 1909 under the direction of Oskar Nedbal. Although the performance was a stormy one, propelling Schreker to the forefront of progressive Viennese composers, Schreker felt encouraged enough to finally complete the opera in 1910.

Alban Berg prepared the vocal score of the opera in 1911. The work is dedicated to Bruno Walter.

== Performance history ==
The opera was first performed on 18 August 1912 by the Oper Frankfurt, conducted by Ludwig Rottenberg and continued to be performed regularly over the next two decades when it held a special place in the German-speaking world as one of the pioneering works of modern opera. Important productions included the Czech premiere in May 1920 at the Neues Deutsches Theater in Prague under Alexander Zemlinsky and the highly successful Berlin State Opera production of May 1925 under Erich Kleiber with Richard Tauber and the composers wife Maria Schreker in the leading roles. The opera was also staged in Leningrad (1925) and Stockholm (1927). The last productions during Schreker's lifetime were at the Theater Aachen and in Teplitz-Schönau during the 1930/31 season, whereafter the Nazi ban on Entartete Musik caused it to disappear from the repertory.

The opera has been rediscovered and became popular as illustrated by the number of performances it received in 2010. These included a revival of the Peter Mussbach production at the Berlin State Opera first staged in 2001 and another production at the Opernhaus Zürich, conducted by Ingo Metzmacher, with Juliane Banse and Roberto Saccà in the leading roles. The opera was also given as part of Bard SummerScape, Bard College's summer festival in July-August in Annandale-on-Hudson, New York under music director Leon Botstein and staged by "visionary director" Thaddeus Strassberger.

A new production at Bonn Opera opened in December 2011 and another staging took place at the Opéra national du Rhin in Strasbourg in October 2012. In 2019, a new production was staged by the Oper Frankfurt where the world premiere had taken place, conducted by Sebastian Weigle, staged by Damiano Michieletto with Jennifer Holloway and Ian Koziara in the leading roles. The production was dedicated to Michael Gielen who had initiated the Schreker revival in Frankfurt with Die Gezeichneten in 1979.

In October 2019, a new production was staged at the Royal Swedish Opera, conducted by Stefan Blunier and directed by Christof Loy, with Agneta Eichenholz as Grete and Daniel Johansson as Fritz.

In March 2022, a new staging opened at the Prague State Opera in a production by Timofey Kulyabin conducted by Karl-Heinz Steffens with Světlana Aksenova and Aleš Brescien in the leading roles.

== Roles ==
Roles, voice types, premier cast
Role	Voice type	Premiere cast, 18 August 1912 (Conductor: Ludwig Rottenberg)
Act 1
Old Graumann, a retired civil servant	baritone	Richard Korschen
Old Graumann's Wife	mezzo-soprano	Marie Welling-Bertram
Grete, their daughter	soprano	Lisbeth Sellin
Fritz, a young artist	tenor	Karl Gentner
Landlord of the inn "Zum Schwan"	bass	Josef Gareis
A bad actor	baritone	Rudolf Brinkmann
Dr. Vigelius, a pettifogger	high bass	Herbert Stock
An old woman	mezzo-soprano	Bella Fortner-Halbaerth
Act 2
Greta, a dancer (alias Grete Graumann)	soprano	Lisbeth Sellin
Mizi, a dancer	soprano	Anita Franz
Milli, a dancer	soprano	Fulda Kopp
Mary, a dancer	soprano	Lina Doninger
A Spanish girl, a dancer	soprano	Frieda Cornelius
The count, 24 years old	baritone	Richard Breitenfeld
The baron, 50 years old	bass	Alfred Hauck
The chevalier, 30–35 years old	tenor	Erik Wirl
Fritz	tenor	Karl Gentner
Act 3
Fritz	tenor	Karl Gentner
Tini (alias Grete Graumann)	soprano	Lisbeth Sellin
Rudolf, a doctor, Fritz's friend	high bass or baritone	Walter Schneider
Dr. Vigelius	high bass	Herbert Stock
An actor	baritone	Rudolf Brinkmann
First chorus member	tenor	Otto Weindel
Second chorus member	bass	Carl Bauermann
Waitress	mezzo-soprano	Alma Wendorf
A dubious individual	tenor	Hermann Schramm
A policeman	bass	Wilhelm Drumm
A servant	speaking role	

== Instrumentation ==
The orchestral score requires:

- Woodwinds: 3 flutes (2nd and 3rd doubling piccolos), 3 oboes (3rd doubling cor anglais), 2 clarinets in A/B♭, bass clarinet in B♭ (doubling E♭ clarinet and tenor saxophone), 2 bassoon, contrabassoon
- Brass: 4 horns in F, 3 trumpets in C (1st and 3rd doubling trumpets in E♭/F/A/E, 3rd doubling bass trumpet in E♭/D), 3 trombones, bass tuba (doubling contrabass tuba)
- Percussion: timpani, percussion (three players)
- Keyboard: celesta
- Strings: violins I, violins II, violas, cellos, double basses, 2 harps
- Onstage (Gypsy Music): clarinet in E♭/D, cimbalom, 2 violins, viola, cello, double bass
- Offstage: flute, clarinet in A/B♭, 2 horns in F, timpani, tambourine, piano or pianino, celesta, 2 violins, viola, cello, double bass, harp, 3 mandolins, 2 guitars

The percussion section consists of the following instruments:

- bass drum, snare drum, cymbals, triangle, tambourine, tam-tam, panderoa without jingles (frame drum), xylophone, castanets, glockenspiel, crotales, tubular bells

The offstage music appears as three different kinds of music:

- Venetian Music (Act II): flute, clarinet in A/B♭, tambourine, 2 violins, viola, cello, double bass, 3 mandolins, 2 guitars
- Theater Music (Act III, Scene 1-2): clarinet in A/B♭, 2 horns in F, timpani, 2 violins, viola, cello, double bass, harp
- Undulating Sound (Act III, Scene 10-13): celesta, piano or pianino, harp (ad libitum)

== Synopsis ==
=== Act 1 ===
Fritz, a composer, and Grete Graumann, the daughter of a poor retired officer, are in love. Fritz wants to marry Grete, but he tells her that before that happens, he has to write a great piece of music and discover the mysterious distant sound ("der ferne Klang") which he hears within him. Grete tries in vain to convince him to stay with her. Fritz leaves his childhood sweetheart and goes in search of the distant sound.

As Grete is returning to her house, she meets a strange old woman, who asks the surprised girl about Fritz and promises to help Grete if she needs it. Grete continues on her way home.

Back at home, Grete's mother, Frau Graumann, speaks to Grete about the debts the family has accrued. Frau Graumann has decided that instead of borrowing money, Grete should get a job to help improve their financial situation. Grete complains that her father drinks too much.

Just as she is saying this, Grete's father, Graumann, arrives with his drinking companions, an actor and Dr. Vigelius. Graumann has just gambled his daughter away to his landlord in a dice game and they have come to collect the debt. When Grete refuses, her father becomes furious. Before he can do violence to his daughter, his comrades drag Graumann back to the pub.

To calm her mother, Grete pretends to be happy to marry the landlord. But when her mother leaves her alone in the room, she jumps out of the window and hurries away to find Fritz.

Grete cannot catch up with Fritz and falls exhausted on the shore of a lake. She thinks of drowning herself, but then becomes conscious of the beauty of nature at night. She falls asleep, dreaming of their loving. The old woman, in reality a prostitute, appears again and promises to bring Grete a shining future if she will only follow her.

=== Act 2 ===
Ten years later, Grete is the queen of the demimonde on an island in the gulf of Venice, where we find her in the dance salon "La Casa di Maschere". But even with her fame and success, she still thinks of Fritz.

This particular day, she promises that she will end the suffering of her suitors and decide on her next lover, announcing that whoever can touch her heart the most deeply with a song will win her. The Count sings "In einem Lande ein bleicher König", a sad but beautiful song, which the crowd applauds. The Chevalier counters with "Das Blumenmädchen von Sorrent", a bawdy song that the crowd enjoys as they noisily join in the singing.

As Grete is making up her mind, a stranger appears in the midst. It is Fritz, who recognizes Grete immediately and goes straight to her. He tells her that he has not found the distant sound that has been eluding him these past ten years, so he has gone in search of her instead and now wants to make her his wife.

While Grete is still in love with Fritz and would like to be with him, she decides she must reveal to him that she is a courtesan, and then asks if he still wants to marry her. At first he does not believe it, but when the Count challenges him to a duel, Fritz, shaken and disappointed, refuses to duel and departs. Grete, in her despair, falls into the arms of the Count.

=== Act 3 ===
Five more years have passed, and Fritz has completed his opera, Die Harfe. During the premiere, the first act goes well, but the second act ends with an audience riot because nobody likes the music.

Grete, meanwhile, has lost the protection of the Count and is now a common streetwalker. She hears of the riot and is concerned for Fritz. On the way home, she is accosted by someone on the street, and Dr. Vigelius and the actors, who are staying in a hotel close by, appear and save her from being molested. Dr. Vigelius escorts Grete to his house, telling her that he very much regrets allowing Graumann to gamble away his daughter.

Fritz sits at home, old and depressed. He recognizes too late that he has destroyed not only his life, but also his love. In vain, his friend Rudolf tries to cheer him up and reminds him that there is still time to rewrite the opera. Fritz tells him that he is near the end of his life and only wants to see Grete, whom he foolishly pushed away twice. Rudolf goes to look for her, but Dr. Vigelius arrives instead, bringing Grete.

Grete and Fritz gratefully sink into each other's arms. Finally the composer hears the distant sound, which, it seems, was always within reach. He joyfully begins to write a new ending to his opera, but before he can finish, he dies in the arms of his beloved.

== Recordings ==
- In 1991 Capriccio released a 1990 recording with Gerd Albrecht conducting the Berlin Radio Symphony Orchestra and Gabriele Schnaut and Thomas Moser in the principal roles.
- In 2000, Naxos released a January 1989 live recording from the Hagen Municipal Hall, Germany, with Michael Halász conducting the Hagen Philharmonic Orchestra, and Elena Grigorescu and Thomas Harper in the principal roles.
