= William Steinberg =

German-American conductor (1899–1978)

William Steinberg, c. 1950

William Steinberg (Cologne, August 1, 1899 – New York City, May 16, 1978) was a German-American conductor.

== Biography ==
Steinberg was born Hans Wilhelm Steinberg in Cologne, Germany. He displayed early talent as a violinist, pianist, and composer, conducting his own choral/orchestral composition (based on texts from Ovid's Metamorphoses) at age 13. In 1914, he began studies at the Cologne Conservatory, where his piano teacher was the Clara Schumann pupil Lazzaro Uzielli and his conducting mentor was Hermann Abendroth. He graduated with distinction, winning the Wüllner Prize for conducting, in 1919. He immediately became a second violinist in the Cologne Opera orchestra, but was dismissed from the position by Otto Klemperer for using his own bowings. He was soon re-hired by Klemperer as an assistant, and in 1922, he conducted Fromental Halévy's opera La Juive as a substitute. When Klemperer left in 1924, Steinberg served as principal conductor. He left a year later, in 1925, for Prague, where he was conductor of the German Theater. He next took the position of music director of the Oper Frankfurt. In 1930, in Frankfurt, he conducted the world premiere of Arnold Schoenberg's Von heute auf morgen.

In 1933, Steinberg was relieved of his post by the Nazis because he was Jewish. According to the grandson of composer Ernst Toch, Steinberg was "rehearsing [Toch's opera Der Fächer (The Fan)] in Cologne when Nazi brownshirts came storming into the hall and literally lifted the baton out of his hand".; Steinberg, who had married Lotte Stern in Frankfurt in 1934, was then restricted to conducting concerts for the Jewish Culture League in Frankfurt and Berlin. The Steinbergs left Germany in 1936 for the British Mandate of Palestine. Eventually, with co-founder Bronisław Huberman, Steinberg trained the Palestine Symphony Orchestra, which would later be known as the Israel Philharmonic Orchestra. Steinberg was conducting the orchestra when Arturo Toscanini visited there in 1936. Toscanini was impressed with Steinberg's preliminary groundwork for his concerts and later engaged him as an assistant in preparing for the NBC Symphony Orchestra radio broadcasts.

Steinberg emigrated to the United States in 1938. He conducted a number of concerts with the NBC Symphony Orchestra from 1938 to 1940. He conducted summer concerts at Lewisohn Stadium at the City College of New York (1940–41), led New York Philharmonic concerts in 1943–44, and also conducted at the San Francisco Opera. He became a US citizen in 1944, and was engaged as music director of the Buffalo Philharmonic Orchestra from 1945 to 1952. Steinberg is best known for his long tenure as music director of the Pittsburgh Symphony Orchestra from 1952 to 1976. Steinberg's Pittsburgh appearances in January 1952 were so impressive, he was quickly engaged as music director and also signed to a recording contract with Capitol Records. Thereafter, Pittsburgh was the center of his activity although he held other important positions. From 1958 to 1960, he also conducted the London Philharmonic Orchestra, but eventually resigned that post because the added workload led to medical problems with his conducting arm. Steinberg led the New York Philharmonic for twelve weeks while on sabbatical leave from Pittsburgh in 1964–65; this led to his engagement as the philharmonic's principal guest conductor from 1966 to 1968. From 1969 to 1972, Steinberg was music director of the Boston Symphony Orchestra (with which he had achieved earlier success as guest conductor), while maintaining his Pittsburgh post. He toured Europe with the Boston Symphony in April 1971.

These additional engagements often led to rumors that Steinberg would leave Pittsburgh for a full-time position elsewhere. In 1968 though he declared, "We are too closely wed, the Pittsburgh Symphony and I, to contemplate any divorce." On another occasion, Steinberg said that conducting had become the profession of a traveling salesman. "A conductor has to stay put to educate an orchestra." However, by 1975, Steinberg was suffering from heart and circulatory ailments and he felt pressured to end his tenure and retired from his Pittsburgh post at the end of the 1975–76 season.

Steinberg guest-conducted most of the major US orchestras, including the Chicago Symphony, Cincinnati Symphony, Cleveland Orchestra, Dallas Symphony, Detroit Symphony, Los Angeles Philharmonic, Philadelphia Orchestra, San Francisco Symphony, and Seattle Symphony. Abroad he conducted the Bavarian Radio Symphony Orchestra, Berlin Philharmonic, Frankfurt Opera and Museum Orchestra, Frankfurt Radio Symphony, the Hague Residentie Orkest, Israel Philharmonic Orchestra, Montreal Symphony Orchestra, Munich Philharmonic, Orchestre de la Société des Concerts du Conservatoire, Orchestre National de la RTF, Orchestra dell'Accademia Nazionale di Santa Cecilia, Philharmonia Orchestra, RAI Orchestra of Rome, Orchestra of the Teatro di San Carlo, Royal Concertgebouw Orchestra (in their 1955 Beethoven cycle), Royal Liverpool Philharmonic, Royal Philharmonic, Tonhalle Orchester Zürich, Toronto Symphony Orchestra, Vancouver Symphony Orchestra, Vienna Symphony, and WDR Symphony Orchestra Cologne. He also appeared at summer festivals in the US and Canada (Ambler Temple University Festival, Hollywood Bowl, Ojai, Ravinia, Robin Hood Dell, Saratoga, Tanglewood, and Vancouver) as well as in Europe (Salzburg, Lucerne, Montreux). Steinberg conducted at the Metropolitan Opera in several productions including Barber's Vanessa, Verdi's Aida, and Wagner's Die Walküre, during his sabbatical in 1964–65, and Wagner's Parsifal in 1974.

Steinberg had been in declining health for several years; on May 1, 1978, he conducted the final concert of his career, leading the New York Philharmonic with guest violinist Isaac Stern. He was hospitalized following the concert and died on May 16, 1978, at the age of 78. He is buried beside his wife Lotte, in Green River Cemetery in East Hampton, New York.

== Recording activity ==
Steinberg made his first recording in 1928 with the Stastskapelle Berlin, accompanying Bronisław Huberman in Tchaikovsky's Violin Concerto. In 1940, Steinberg recorded excerpts from Wagner's Lohengrin, Tristan und Isolde, and Tannhäuser as well as Mozart's The Marriage of Figaro, with members of the Metropolitan Opera, issued anonymously on "World's Greatest Opera" records. In 1946, Steinberg made a single recording for the Musicraft label with the Buffalo Philharmonic Orchestra in the first studio recording of Shostakovich's Symphony No. 7 (Leningrad). He made several concerto recordings for RCA Victor, leading the RCA Victor Orchestra with soloists Alexander Brailowsky, Jascha Heifetz, William Kapell, and Arthur Rubinstein.

Steinberg made numerous recordings for Capitol Records, all but two of them with the Pittsburgh Symphony Orchestra. The exceptions included a recording with the Los Angeles Woodwinds of Mozart's Gran Partita, K.361, taped in Hollywood in August 1952, and the aforementioned Strauss disc with the Philharmonia Orchestra. His Pittsburgh recordings for Capitol, all made in the Syria Mosque, included concertos with Nathan Milstein and Rudolf Firkušný, as well as a cross-section of the symphonic repertoire from Beethoven to Wagner. Several of Steinberg's Capitol recordings were later reissued by the budget Pickwick label. In 2011, nearly all of Steinberg's Capitol recordings were reissued on CD in a 20 disc boxed set from EMI.

In 1960, Steinberg and the Pittsburgh Symphony recorded three releases for Everest Records, but by mutual agreement this contract was terminated when Everest abandoned their classical recording program. These were audiophile 35mm film master recordings, a technique pioneered by Everest at that time. A casualty of this decision was a planned recording of Mahler's Sixth Symphony with the London Philharmonic, which was to have been made in conjunction with Steinberg's performance given as part of the Mahler centenary in London. In March, 1961, Steinberg and the Pittsburgh Symphony signed a contract with Enoch Light's Command Records label. Light had attended a Steinberg concert in Danbury, Connecticut a few years earlier and told the conductor he'd like to record the orchestra. After the Everest contract lapsed, Steinberg subsequently made a number of technically acclaimed records for Command on 35mm film recording stock. The Command releases, hailed as "outstanding examples of contemporary recording," were made in the Soldiers and Sailors Memorial Hall in Pittsburgh. Light preferred the sound of this high-ceilinged auditorium with its open stage to that of Syria Mosque for recording. The initial Command recordings, Brahms Symphony No. 2 and Rachmaninoff Symphony No. 2, were taped on May 1–2, 1961. Steinberg's recording of the Brahms Symphony No. 2 was nominated for a Grammy for Classical Album of the Year in 1962. Steinberg said of these sessions, "At first I opposed this location, because I can't hear the orchestra there, the ceiling is so high. I suppose it must be so high to make room for the Lincoln inscription. But the engineers said, 'The microphones hear very well, and we will use a lot of them.' Who am I to argue with the engineers? So we recorded in Memorial Hall. I am the only conductor in history who memorized the Gettysburg Address while rehearsing Brahms' Second Symphony."

Steinberg's Command recordings eventually included complete cycles of the Beethoven and Brahms Symphonies, along with a diverse list of other works. Command's Pittsburgh Symphony activity ended after Steinberg recorded Bruckner's Seventh Symphony, his early Overture in G minor, two arrangements by Robert Russell Bennett, and Dmitri Shostakovich's Symphony No. 1 in April 1968. Command Vice President and General Manager Loren Becker stated that "Steinberg's stature as a great conductor will also mean many more recordings of standard fare." However Becker departed Command a few months later and ABC Records, the label's owner, ended the Pittsburgh series. When Steinberg assumed his post with the Boston Symphony in 1969, he made recordings, first for RCA Red Seal, then Deutsche Grammophon, which signed the Boston Symphony upon expiration of the RCA contract. Steinberg's Boston Symphony recordings for both RCA and DG were praised by critics for their excellence, both musically and technically.

== Awards and honors ==
Steinberg received numerous awards, including both the Kilenyi Bruckner Medal and the Kilenyi Mahler Medal from The Bruckner Society of America. He was named a member of the International Institute of Arts and Letters in 1960. Steinberg was given a star on the Hollywood Walk of Fame the same year. The Pittsburgh Chamber of Commerce named Steinberg Man of the Year for 1964 for his contributions to the city's cultural life, and for leading the Pittsburgh Symphony on a triumphant tour of Europe and the Middle East. He was also an honorary member of Phi Mu Alpha Sinfonia, the national fraternity for men in music. Steinberg received an honorary doctorate of music from Carnegie Institute of Technology in 1954, an honorary doctorate of music from Duquesne University in 1964, and an honorary doctorate of humanities from the University of Pittsburgh in 1966. He was named Sanford Professor of Music at Yale University in September 1973, and conducted several concerts with the Yale Philharmonia.

== Conducting style and repertoire ==
William Steinberg was noted throughout his career for his straightforward yet expressive musical style, leading familiar works with integrity and authority such that they sounded fresh and vital. Despite the dynamic drive of his interpretations, his podium manner was a model of restraint. Steinberg said of his interpretive philosophy, "One must always respect the character of the music and never try to grow lush foliage in a well tempered English garden." Referring to some of his more acrobatic colleagues, Steinberg remarked, "The more they move around, the quieter I get." He told another interviewer, "A conductor does the dirty work at rehearsal. At a concert, he just reminds and signals; that's all that's needed."

Pittsburgh principal flute Bernard Goldberg told how Steinberg "looked forward to being 70 years old because only then did a conductor know what he was doing." Armando Ghitalla, distinguished Boston Symphony principal trumpet from 1966 to 1979, said of Steinberg that "his musical taste was one of the finest I've ever heard." Boston Symphony concertmaster Joseph Silverstein said Steinberg was "as sophisticated a musician as I have ever known."

Steinberg had a wide range of repertoire, including a sympathy for the English music of Elgar and Vaughan Williams. He led several important premieres, including the US premiere of Anton Webern's Six Pieces for Orchestra, Op. 6. During his first Pittsburgh season, Steinberg conducted works by Bartók, Berg, Bloch, Britten, Copland, Harris, Honegger, Milhaud, Schuman, Stravinsky, Vaughan Williams, and Villa-Lobos at the Pittsburgh International Contemporary Music Festival (all of these performances appeared on record, and the Bloch, Schuman, and Vaughan Williams were licensed by Capitol). He was also admired as an interpreter of Beethoven, Brahms, Bruckner, Mahler, Strauss, and Wagner. He made a famous recording of Holst's The Planets with the Boston Symphony for Deutsche Grammophon, after learning the piece at the age of 70. Unusual for a conductor born in Europe, Steinberg was a sympathetic conductor of George Gershwin's music (he made Gershwin recordings for three different labels). His last Metropolitan Opera appearances were three performances of Wagner's Parsifal in April 1974.

Although sometimes criticized for his unusual programming, Steinberg was a champion of certain lesser known works including Berlioz's Roméo et Juliette, Tchaikovsky's Manfred Symphony, Reger's Variations and Fugue on a Theme by Mozart, and his own orchestral transcription of Verdi's String Quartet in E minor. Steinberg said, "The literature is so enormous. I look into what my colleagues won't. Actually, I am not success minded. I merely dare. I take a risk. Criticism I get anyway." Steinberg's prestige however filled Carnegie Hall to 80 percent capacity under the unlikely circumstance of the first all-Schoenberg orchestral program ever given in New York.

== Personality ==
Steinberg once remarked to a San Francisco Symphony musician he corrected, "I may be wrong, but I don't think so." Violinist David Schneider said, "This quality of not taking himself too seriously endeared him to the musicians." Although all business on the podium, Steinberg was not above a bit of clowning in public; at one Pittsburgh Symphony fundraiser, he donned a blonde wig on his bald head that Johnny Carson jokingly presented him. Steinberg's puckish humor was often in evidence, as when he told Time Magazine that he had conceived "something for the New York snobs—an all-Mendelssohn program. This is really the height of snobbishness, the wonderful answer to the question of just what do the snobs need." He said that he spoke four and a half languages – the half being English. Of his habit of eating a steak before every concert he conducted, Steinberg told a columnist, "So you see, it's an expensive business – this concert conducting." Referring to a disagreement with violinist Nathan Milstein that led to Milstein walking out of a rehearsal, Steinberg said, "He decided he would not stay and I decided I would not have him." Concerning acoustics he said, "If the hall is resonant, the tempos must be changed. If the acoustics are too bad, you go fast in order to go home quickly!" Steinberg once reacted to an orchestra's sloppy playing of a passage with a typical quip: "Next time, more notes." To an interviewer who said he had heard that the conductor did not care for giving interviews, Steinberg replied that it was fine as long as the subject was one that interested him – "for instance, myself."

== Conductor and music director ==
External audio
- Steinberg conducting the Boston Symphony Orchestra and pianist André Watts in Ludwig van Beethoven's Coriolan Overture Op. 62 and Piano Concerto No. 4 Op. 58 in 1970

- 1924 Cologne Opera
- 1925–1929 Prague State Opera
- 1929–1933 Oper Frankfurt, Frankfurt am Main
- 1936–1938 Israel Philharmonic Orchestra (As the Palestine Symphony Orchestra)
- 1945–1952 Buffalo Philharmonic Orchestra
- 1952–1976 Pittsburgh Symphony Orchestra
- 1958–1960 London Philharmonic Orchestra
- 1969–1972 Boston Symphony Orchestra

== Recording chronology ==
Recording made with the Staatskapelle Berlin for Parlophone Records:

- December 28, 1928 Pyotr Ilyich Tchaikovsky: Concerto for Violin (Bronislaw Huberman)

Recordings made with the "Publishers Service Symphony Orchestra" for World's Greatest Opera Records:

- May 26–27, 1940 Richard Wagner: Tristan und Isolde excerpts (R. Bampton, A. Carron, L. Summers)
- May 27–28, 1940 Richard Wagner: Lohengrin excerpts (R. Bampton, L. Summers, A. Carron, M. Harrell, N. Cordon); Tannhäuser excerpts (R. Bampton, A. Carron, M. Harrell, B. Hober or L. Senderowna)
- June 5, 1940 Wolfgang Amadeus Mozart: Le nozze di Figaro excerpts (V. Della Chiesa, A. Dickey, L. Browning, N. Cordon, G. Cehanovsky)

Recording made for Columbia Records

- 1942 (exact date unknown) Georges Bizet: Carmen, Air des fleurs (J. Kiepura)

Recording made with the Buffalo Philharmonic Orchestra for Musicraft:

- December 3 & 5, 1946 Dmitri Shostakovich: Symphony No. 7, "Leningrad" (This was the first commercial recording of the work. The date for the studio session is derived from the December 4, 1946, Buffalo Courier-Express, which states: "The recording to be cut tomorrow morning should bring honor to Shostakovich, the Philharmonic, and thereby to the City of Buffalo." The matrix numbers however indicate that some sides of the issued 78 rpm set were recorded at the December 3, 1946, concert performance.)
- Allegro Records LP issue, LP 3041, four sides, sourced as follows according to the sleeve note: "various takes of the original recording were first transferred to tape and then edited into a unified whole. This included portions of a concert performance of the latter part of the symphony."

Recordings made for RCA Victor (with RCA Victor orchestra unless otherwise noted):

- March 26, 1946 Frédéric Chopin: Piano Concerto No. 2 (Artur Rubinstein), NBC Symphony Orchestra
- May 9–10, 1947 Robert Schumann: Piano Concerto (Artur Rubinstein)
- September 12, 1947 Max Bruch: Scottish Fantasy (Jascha Heifetz, violin)
- February 19, 1949 Alexander Glazunov: Violin Concerto (Nathan Milstein)
- April 14, 1949 Frédéric Chopin: Piano Concerto No. 1 (Alexander Brailowsky)
- July 7, 1950 Sergei Rachmaninoff: Piano Concerto No. 2 (William Kapell), Robin Hood Dell Orchestra
- June 12–13, 1951 Édouard Lalo: Symphonie espagnole (Jascha Heifetz, violin)
- June 15, 1951 Ludwig van Beethoven: Romance No. 1 and 2 for Violin (Jascha Heifetz)
- June 15, 1951 Pablo de Sarasate: Zigeunerweisen (Jascha Heifetz, violin)
- June 18, 1951 Camille Saint-Saëns: Havanaise (Jascha Heifetz, violin)
- June 19, 1951 Camille Saint-Saëns: Introduction and rondo capriccioso (Jascha Heifetz, violin)

Recordings made with the Pittsburgh Symphony for Capitol Records:

- February 9, 1952 Franz Schubert: Symphony No. 2, Symphony No. 8
- February 10, 1952 Ludwig van Beethoven: Symphony No. 6
- April 15, 1952 Pyotr Ilyich Tchaikovsky: Symphony No. 5
- February 8, 1953 George Gershwin: Piano Concerto (Leonard Pennario)
- February 9, 1953 Wolfgang Amadeus Mozart: Symphony No. 35, Symphony No. 41
- February 10, 1953 Gustav Mahler: Symphony No. 1
- February 11, 1953 Johann Strauss II: Acceleration Waltz, Adelen Waltz, Emperor Waltz, Annen Polka, Champagne Polka, Pizzicato Polka, Perpetuum Mobile, Tritsch-Tratsch Polka, Thunder and Lightning Polka
- November 17, 1952 Felix Mendelssohn: Symphony No. 3, Richard Wagner: Siegfried's Rhine Journey, Siegfried's Funeral Music, Tristan und Isolde: Prelude & Liebestod
- November 28, 1953 Max Bruch: Violin Concerto No. 1, Felix Mendelssohn: Violin Concerto (Nathan Milstein)
- November 29, 1953 & April 13, 1954 Johannes Brahms: Violin Concerto (Nathan Milstein)
- November 30, 1953 Sergei Prokofiev: Symphony No. 1
- November 30, 1953, and April 14, 1954: Pyotr Ilyich Tchaikovsky: Symphony No. 6, Serenade for String Orchestra
- December 1, 1953 Igor Stravinsky: Le Sacre du printemps
- January 25, 1954 Sergei Rachmaninoff: Symphony No. 2
- January 26, 1954 Richard Strauss: Till Eulenspiegels lustige Streiche, Tod und Verklärung
- April 15–16, 1954 Ludwig van Beethoven: Symphony No. 5, Symphony No. 8
- January 11, 1955 Nikolai Rimsky-Korsakov: Scheherezade
- January 19, 1955 Ludwig van Beethoven: Violin Concerto (Nathan Milstein)
- October 30, 1955 Ludwig van Beethoven: Symphony No. 3
- April 17, 1956 Johannes Brahms: Symphony No. 1
- April 18, 1956 Richard Wagner: Die Meistersinger von Nürnberg – Prelude, Parsifal – Prelude and Good Friday Music, Siegfried Idyll
- April 19, 1956 Anton Bruckner: Symphony No. 4 (1888 version)
- October 14, 1956 Johannes Brahms: Piano Concerto No. 1 (Rudolf Firkušný)
- October 15–16, 1956 Ernst Toch: Symphony No. 3, Paul Hindemith: Symphony: Mathis der Maler
- March 25, 1957 Edward Elgar: Enigma Variations
- March 26, 1957 Ludwig van Beethoven: Symphony No. 7
- April 16, 1957 Antonín Dvořák: Violin Concerto (Nathan Milstein)
- April 17, 1957 Alexander Glazunov: Violin Concerto (Nathan Milstein)
- April 18, 1957 Ralph Vaughan Williams: Fantasia on a Theme by Thomas Tallis
- October 21, 1957 Nikolai Rimsky-Korsakov: Le Coq d'Or Suite, Sergei Prokofiev: Love for Three Oranges Suite
- October 26, 1957 Ludwig van Beethoven: Piano Concerto No. 5 (Rudolf Firkušný)
- October 28, 1957 Wolfgang Amadeus Mozart: Serenade No. 13, Eine kleine Nachtmusik
- October 29, 1957 Wolfgang Amadeus Mozart: Symphony No. 40
- March 11, 1958 Pyotr Ilyich Tchaikovsky: Marche Slave
- March 18, 1958: Mikhail Glinka: Kamarinskaya, Alexander Borodin: Polovtsian Dances, Modest Mussorgsky: A Night on Bare Mountain
- October 20, 1958 George Frideric Handel: Water Music (arr. Harty)
- October 28, 1958 Joseph Haydn: Symphony No. 94
- October 29, 1958 Maurice Ravel: Pavane pour une infante défunte, La Valse, Boléro
- April 4, 1959 Felix Mendelssohn: Symphony No. 4, Pyotr Ilyich Tchaikovsky: Capriccio Italien
- April 6, 1959 Pyotr Ilyich Tchaikovsky: Violin Concerto (Nathan Milstein)
- April 16, 1959 Hugo Wolf: Italian Serenade

Recordings made with the Pittsburgh Symphony for ASCAP Records:

- November 24, 1952 Ernest Bloch: Concerto Grosso No. 1, William Schuman: Symphony for Strings (both later released by Capitol), Benjamin Britten: Serenade, Béla Bartók: Music for Strings, Percussion and Celesta
- November 26, 1952 Igor Stravinsky: Symphony of Psalms, Heitor Villa-Lobos: Bachianas Brasilieris No. 1, Darius Milhaud: Protée, Roy Harris: Symphony No. 5
- November 28, 1952 Arthur Honegger: Symphony No. 5, Aaron Copland: A Lincoln Portrait, Alban Berg: Violin Concerto (Szymon Goldberg), Ralph Vaughan Williams: Five Tudor Portraits (Vaughan Williams later issued by Capitol)

Recordings made with the Los Angeles Winds for Capitol Records:

- August 22–23, 1952 Wolfgang Amadeus Mozart: Serenade No. 10, Gran Partita

Recordings made with the Philharmonia Orchestra for EMI Records:

- April 16–17, 1957 Richard Strauss: Don Juan, Der Rosenkavalier Suite

Recordings made with the Pittsburgh Symphony Orchestra for Everest Records:

- February 13, 1960 Robert Russell Bennett: A Commemoration Symphony (based on works by Stephen Foster); A Symphonic Story of Jerome Kern
- February 14, 1960 Johannes Brahms: Symphony No. 4
- February 16, 1960 George Gershwin: Rhapsody in Blue (with Jesus Maria Sanroma), An American in Paris

Recordings made with the Pittsburgh Symphony Orchestra for Command Classics:

- May 1–2, 1961 Johannes Brahms: Symphony No. 2
- May 1–2, 1961 Sergei Rachmaninoff: Symphony No. 2
- November 1–4, 1961 Johannes Brahms: Symphony No. 1
- November 1–4, 1961 Richard Wagner: Selections from Der Ring des Nibelungen
- November 1–4, 1961 Ludwig van Beethoven: Symphony No. 7
- April 30, 1962 Johannes Brahms: Symphony No. 3, Tragic Overture
- May 1, 1962 Ludwig van Beethoven: Symphony No. 4, Leonore Overture No. 3
- May 2, 1962 Franz Schubert: Symphony No. 3, Symphony No. 8
- April 29 – May 1, 1963 Ludwig van Beethoven: Symphony No. 3, Eroica
- April 29 – May 1, 1963 Richard Wagner: Preludes and Overtures
- April 29 – May 1, 1963 Pyotr Ilyich Tchaikovsky: Symphony No. 4
- April 27 – May 1, 1964 Ludwig van Beethoven: Symphony No. 1, Symphony No. 2
- April 27 – May 1, 1964 Giuseppe Verdi: String Quartet in E (arr. Steinberg)
- April 27 – May 1, 1964 Pyotr Ilyich Tchaikovsky: Nutcracker Suite
- June 7–9, 1965 Johannes Brahms: Symphony No. 4
- June 7–9, 1965 Ludwig van Beethoven: Symphony No. 5
- June 7–9, 1965 Ludwig van Beethoven: Symphony No. 6
- April 4–6, 1966 Ludwig van Beethoven: Symphony No. 9 (Choral)
- April 4–6, 1966 Ludwig van Beethoven: Symphony No. 8
- April 4–6, 1966 Igor Stravinsky: Petrouchka
- May 15, 17, 18, 1967 Maurice Ravel: Valses nobles et sentimentales
- May 15, 17, 18, 1967 Antonín Dvořák: Scherzo capriccioso
- May 15, 17, 18, 1967 Hector Berlioz: Rakoczy March
- May 15, 17, 18, 1967 Camille Saint-Saëns: French Military March
- May 15, 17, 18, 1967 Johann Strauss: Perpetual Motion, Tritsch-Tratsch Polka
- May 15, 17, 18, 1967 George Gershwin: Porgy and Bess – Symphonic Picture, An American in Paris
- May 15, 17, 18, 1967 Aaron Copland: Appalachian Spring, Billy the Kid
- May 15, 17, 18, 1967 John Francis Wade (attr.): Adeste Fidelis
- April 6–8, 1968 Dmitri Shostakovich: Symphony No. 1
- April 6–8, 1968 Anton Bruckner: Symphony No. 7, Overture in G Minor
- April 9–10, 1968 Robert Russell Bennett: The Sound of Music – Symphonic Picture, My Fair Lady – Symphonic Picture

Recordings made with the Boston Symphony Orchestra for RCA Victor:

- September 29, 1969 Franz Schubert: Symphony No. 9, D. 944 (The Great)
- January 12, 1970 Camille Saint-Saëns: Danse macabre with Joseph Silverstein, violin
- January 12, 1970 Richard Strauss: Till Eulenspiegel's Merry Pranks, Op. 28
- January 12, 1970 Igor Stravinsky: Scherzo fantastique, Op. 3; Scherzo a la Russe
- January 19 and October 19, 1970 Anton Bruckner: Symphony No. 6
- October 26, 1970 Paul Dukas: The Sorcerer's Apprentice
- October 26, 1970 Felix Mendelssohn: Scherzo from Octet in E flat

Recordings made with the Boston Symphony Orchestra for DGG:

- September 28 and October 12, 1970 Gustav Holst: The Planets
- March 24, 1971 Richard Strauss: Also sprach Zarathustra, Op. 30
- October 4/5, 1971 Paul Hindemith: Symphony: Mathis der Maler
- October 5, 1971 Paul Hindemith: Concert Music for Strings and Brass

Live recordings issued commercially:

- July 18, 1943 Johannes Brahms: Violin Concerto – Adolf Busch, New York Philharmonic, Music & Arts CD
- September 10, 1965 Gustav Mahler: Symphony No. 2, "Resurrection" – Cologne Radio Symphony Orchestra and Chorus, ICA Classics CD
- December 19, 1969 Wolfgang Amadeus Mozart: Don Giovanni Overture – Boston Symphony Orchestra Archives Release CD
- November 7 or 9, 1969 Sergei Prokofiev: Piano Concerto No. 3 (with Vladimir Ashkenazy) – Pittsburgh Symphony Orchestra, Intaglio CD
- February 26, 1972 Anton Bruckner: Symphony No. 8 – Boston Symphony Orchestra, BSO From the Broadcast Archives 1943–2000 CD set
- June 15, 1973 Ludwig van Beethoven: Missa Solemnis – Cologne Radio Symphony Orchestra and Chorus, ICA Classics CD

Video concert recordings issued commercially:

- Ludwig van Beethoven: Symphony No. 7 (October 6, 1970) & Symphony No. 8 (January 9, 1962); Joseph Haydn: Symphony No. 55 (October 7, 1969) – Boston Symphony Orchestra, ICA Classics DVD
- Anton Bruckner: Symphony No. 8 (January 9, 1962) – Boston Symphony Orchestra, ICA Classics DVD

Cultural offices
Preceded by Erich Leinsdorf	Music director, Boston Symphony Orchestra; 1969–1972	Succeeded by Seiji Ozawa
