= Margarete Bäumer =

German soprano

Margarete Henriette Therese Roßkopf-Bäumer (26 May 1898 – December 1969) was a German operatic soprano.

== Life ==
Born in Düsseldorf, Bäumer trained her soprano voice in Düsseldorf and Cologne and made her debut in 1920 at the Stadttheater Barmen (later Opernhaus Wuppertal). After stations in Düsseldorf, Zurich, Stuttgart, Berlin (Städtische Oper Berlin), Nuremberg and Mannheim, she came to the Opernhaus Leipzig in 1934, where she quickly became a darling of the public and then worked as a leading dramatic soprano until 1953. At the same time, she had engagements at the Bavarian State Opera (1934-1937) and at the Wrocław Opera.

At the Staatsoper Stuttgart, Bäumer switched to the dramatic repertoire in the mid-1920s and from then on was increasingly celebrated as a Wagner singer. On the occasion of an engagement at the German Grand Opera Society in New York, she performed on tour on all major North American stages. Innumerable guest performances at the opera houses of Europe followed in addition to her regular engagements. Thus she sang - mainly in Wagnerian roles - in Vienna (Staatsoper), Brussels, Dresden (Staatsoper), Basel, Geneva, Paris, Barcelona, Zurich, Prague, Riga, Copenhagen, Amsterdam, Venice, Palermo and Turin. She appeared at the Munich Opera Festival in 1935 (as Elektra) and 1936 (as Brünnhilde), and at the Sopot International Song Festival in 1938 (as Brünnhilde).

Although Bäumer continued to perform from 1954 onwards (in 1960 for the last time in Leipzig), from that year on, she was mainly a professor at the Academy of Music in Leipzig. In 1967 she moved to Inning am Ammersee in the Federal Republic of Germany, where she died in 1969 at the age of 72.

Even during her lifetime, Bäumer was considered one of the most important Wagner singers of her generation. New releases of historical recordings and MP3 releases on music portals still bear witness to this today.

== Recordings ==
- Richard Wagner: Tristan und Isolde, Gewandhausorchester Leipzig conducted by Franz Konwitschny, mit Margarete Bäumer. recorded in Leipzig 1950, 3-CD-Box, Preiser/Naxos 2001
- Richard Wagner: Tannhäuser, Complete recording, choir and orchestra of the Bavarian State Opera conducted Robert Heger, with Margarete Bäumer, recorded in Munich 1951, 3-CD-Box, Membran 2006 and 3-CD-Box Preiser/Naxos 2002
- Richard Strauss: Der Rosenkavalier, complete recording, choir of the Dresden State Opera and Staatskapelle Dresden under Rudolf Kempe, with Margarete Bäumer and others, recorded in Dresden 21-23 December 1950; 3-CD-Box, Gala, 2007, GL 100.633
- ABC der Gesangskunst. Historisches Gesangslexikon Teil 1 (Doppel-CD), Cantus-Line DA-Music, Diepholz 2002
- Great Singers Sing Wagner, among others with Margarete Bäumer, 10-CD-Box, Membran Documents 2003
- Four German Sopranos of the Past, Margarete Bäumer, Emmy Bettendorf, Karion Branzell, Irene Eisinger. Margarete Bäumer singan: Du kennst nun den Frevler (Don Juan) and Siegmund, sieh auf mich (Walküre), Preiser Records, Vienna 2006
- Margarete Bäumer. With arias from Tannhäuser, Götterdämmerung, Tiefland, Don Giovanni and Fidelio Hamburger Archiv für Gesangskunst, Hamburg 2007
