= Else Gentner-Fischer =

German operatic soprano (1883–1943)

Else Gentner-Fischer (5 September 1883 – 26 April 1943) was a German operatic soprano. Although she appeared in operas internationally, her career was mainly centered at the Oper Frankfurt where she was a resident artist from 1907-1935. She excelled in the dramatic soprano repertoire, drawing particular acclaim for her portrayal of Wagnerian heroines. She was also an exponent of the works of contemporary composers. Her career was cut short in 1935 due to political pressures and prejudice exerted against her for being married to a Jewish man. She made recordings with Gramophone & Typewriter Ltd., His Master's Voice, and Polydor Records.

== Life and career ==
Born Else Fischer in Frankfurt am Main, Gentner-Fischer was the daughter of a barber. She studied singing at the Hoch Conservatory before making her professional opera debut in 1905 at the National Theatre Mannheim. That same year she married tenor Karl Gentner, to whom she was later widowed in 1922. She later married baritone Benno Ziegler. In 1906, she and her first husband both joined the roster of singers at the Oper Frankfurt through the invitation of Emil Claar. She made her first appearance at that house in early 1907, and remained committed to that opera house until her retirement from the stage in 1935. Outside of Frankfurt, she appeared as a guest artist at the Berlin State Opera, the Liceu, the Teatro Colón, and the Teatro Real. She toured the United States in 1923-1924 with the German Opera Company and also toured with the Oper Frankfurt to the Netherlands in 1934.

In her early career, Gentner-Fischer sang only smaller parts, but by 1910 she was performing leading roles in the soubrette and lyric soprano repertoire. She notably portrayed the role of Sophie in the Frankfurt premiere of Der Rosenkavalier in 1911. In 1914, she was one of the flower maidens in the Frankfurt premiere of Parsifal. She soon moved into heavier repertoire, excelling in parts like Countess Almaviva in The Marriage of Figaro, Donna Anna in Don Giovanni, the Empress in Die Frau ohne Schatten, the Marschallin in Der Rosenkavalier, Santuzza in Cavalleria rusticana, and the title roles in Aida, Carmen, and Tosca. As her career progressed, Wagnerian heroines increasingly became a more important part of her repertoire; including Brünnhilde in The Ring Cycle, Elsa in Lohengrin, and Isolde in Tristan und Isolde.

In addition to performing works from the standard soprano repertoire, Gentner-Fischer also appeared in many productions by modern composers. In Frankfurt she notably created roles in the world premieres of Hermann Wolfgang von Waltershausen's Oberst Chabert (1912, the Countess), Franz Schreker's Die Gezeichneten (1918, Carlotta Nardi), Ernst Krenek's Der Sprung über den Schatten (1924), and Arnold Schoenberg's Von heute auf morgen (1930, the Wife). In 1923 she performed the role of Myrtocle in the United States premiere of Eugen d'Albert's Die toten Augen at the Auditorium Theatre in Chicago. In 1929 she sang the role of Emilia Marty in the German premiere of Leoš Janáček's The Makropulos Case.

On 23 June 1935, Gentner-Fischer gave her final opera performance in the role of Isolde in Frankfurt. Her career was cut short due to prejudice against her husband who was of Jewish descent. In 1939, Ziegler fled Germany for England, leaving Gentner-Fischer behind. She suffered under the political conditions in her country during World War II and lived the remaining years of her life in seclusion in Upper Bavaria. She died in Prien am Chiemsee in 1943 at the age of 59. She is buried in the Frankfurt Main Cemetery.
