= Damiano Michieletto =

Italian director

- Born: 1975 (age 49–50); Venice, Italy
- Education: Ca' Foscari University of Venice; Scuola d'Arte Drammatica Paolo Grassi
- Occupation: Stage director
- Awards: Laurence Olivier Award

Damiano Michieletto (born 1975) is an Italian stage director especially known for opera. He has staged productions at leading opera houses and festivals worldwide. His awards include the 2015 Laurence Olivier Award for the production of Mascagni's Cavalleria rusticana and Leoncavallo's Pagliacci at the Royal Opera House in London.

== Career ==
Michieletto was born in Venice and grew up in Scorzè, a village in the Metropolitan City of Venice. He graduated in literature at the Ca' Foscari University of Venice, and directing at the Scuola d'Arte Drammatica Paolo Grassi in Milan. He made his directing debut with a production of Weinberger's Švanda dudák at the Wexford Festival in 2003.

Michieletto is a specialist for works by Gioacchino Rossini with a critically acclaimed debut at the Rossini Opera Festival in Pesaro in 2007. At La Fenice in his hometown, he directed Mozart's three operas on librettos by Lorenzo da Ponte. He staged some rarely performed operas by Ramón Carnicer, Michael Daugherty, Nino Rota, Stefano Pavesi and Marco Tutino. In 2012, he made his debut at both the Salzburg Festival, where he directed Puccini's La Bohème, and at the Theater an der Wien, where he directed the same composer's Il trittico.

Michieletto directed at La Scala in Milan, for the first time in the 2013/14 season, a production of Verdi' Un ballo in maschera. At the Salzburg Festival, he directed again Verdi's Falstaff, Rossini's La Cenerentola, with Cecilia Bartoli in the title role. He made his London debut in June 2015, staging Rossini's Guillaume Tell at the Royal Opera House.

Michieletto directed Massenet's Cendrillon at the Komische Oper Berlin in 2016 and the world premiere of Filippo Perocco's Aquagranda at La Fenice in 2016, written on a commission on the occasion of the 50th anniversary of the 1966 acqua alta flooding. In 2019, Michieletto directed Franz Schreker's Der ferne Klang at the Oper Frankfurt, where the world premiere had taken place in 1912.

In 2017, the popstar Mika invited Michieletto to collaborate in the realisation of the CasaMika2 programme on Rai 2. In 2020, he created, wrote and hosted the programme Il volo del calabrone on Rai 5.

In 2021, Michieletto made his debut at Berlin State Opera with Jenufa conducted by Simon Rattle and returned to La Scala with Salome by R. Strauss.

== Productions ==
- 2003 Švanda dudák – Wexford Festival Opera
- 2004 Il trionfo delle belle by Stefano Pavesi – Rossini Opera Festival, Pesaro
- 2007 La gazza ladra – Rossini Opera Festival
- 2008 Lucia di Lammermoor – Opernhaus Zürich
- 2009 Roméo et Juliette – La Fenice
- 2009 Die Entführung aus dem Serail – Teatro San Carlo, Neapel
- 2009 La scala di seta – Rossini Opera Festival
- 2010 Il corsaro – Opernhaus Zürich
- 2010 Don Giovanni – La Fenice
- 2010 Madama Butterfly – Teatro Regio, Turin
- 2010 Sigismondo – Rossini Opera Festival
- 2011 Le nozze di Figaro – La Fenice
- 2011 The Greek Passion by Bohuslav Martinů – Teatro Massimo, Palermo
- 2012 Il ventaglio – Teatro Stabile del Veneto
- 2012 Così fan tutte – La Fenice / Liceu, Barcelona
- 2012 La Bohème – Salzburg Festival
- 2012 Il trittico – Theater an der Wien, Copenhagen Opera House
- 2013 Un ballo in maschera – La Scala, Milano
- 2013 Falstaff – Salzburg Festival
- 2013 Idomeneo – Theater an der Wien
- 2014 L’ispettore generale – Teatro Stabile del Veneto
- 2014 The Rake’s Progress – Opernhaus Leipzig, La Fenice
- 2014 La Cenerentola – Salzburg Festival
- 2015 Il viaggio a Reims – Dutch National Opera
- 2015 Divine Parole (Divinas Palabras by Ramón María del Valle-Inclán – Piccolo Teatro di Milano
- 2015 Guillaume Tell – Royal Opera House, London
- 2015 Die Zauberflöte – La Fenice
- 2015 Cavalleria rusticana, Pagliacci – Royal Opera House
- 2016 Otello by Rossini – Theater an der Wien
- 2016 Die Dreigroschenoper – Piccolo Teatro di Milan
- 2016 Cendrillon – Komische Oper Berlin
- 2016 Aquagranda – world premiere, La Fenice
- 2019 Macbeth – La Fenice
- 2019 Der ferne Klang – Oper Frankfurt

== Awards ==
- 2003 Irish Times Theatre Awards – Best Opera Production, for Schwanda
- 2008 Franco Abbiati Prize – Best Director, for La gazza ladra
- 2013 Reumert Prize – Best Opera Production, for Il Trittico
- 2015 Österreichischer Musiktheaterpreis – category Beste Regie, for Idomeneo at the Theater an der Wien
- 2015 Laurence Olivier Award – Best Opera Production, for Cavalleria rusticana – Pagliacci
- 2017 Franco Abbiati Prize – Best Director, for Aquagranda
- 2018 Franco Abbiati Prize – Best Opera Production, for La Damnation de Faust
