= Lascăr =

Lascăr is both a Romanian surname and a masculine Romanian given name. Notable people with the name include:

- Bogdan Lascăr (born 1974), Romanian sculptor, graphic designer, and film maker
- Lascăr Catargiu (1823–1899), Romanian statesman
- Lascăr Vorel (1879—1918), Romanian Post-Impressionist painter
- Mihail Lascăr (1889–1959), Romanian General during World War II

== See also ==
- Lascar (disambiguation)
