= Lashgari =

Lashgari (Persian: لشگری; adjective form of لشگر (lašgar) – a non-standard alternative form of لشکر (laškar) meaning "army"; "division" – and thus roughly translating as "military", "martial") is a Persian surname. Notable people with the surname include:

- Ali Lashgari (born 19??), Iranian football player
- Ehsan Lashgari (born 1985), Iranian wrestler

== See also ==
- Lashkar (disambiguation)
- Lashkari (disambiguation)
