= Lashkari =

Lashkari may refer to:

People

Lashkari is a Persian name; people with this name include:

- Lashkari ibn Muhammad, Shaddadid ruler of Ganja (971–78)
- Lashkari ibn Musa, Shaddadid ruler of Arran (1034–49)
- Muhammad Shah III Lashkari, Bahmani sultan (1463–1482)

Places

- Lashkari, Dahanu, a village in Maharashtra, India

Languages

- The language Lashkari, known more commonly by its Chagatai derived given name Urdu

Other

- Lashkari (racehorse) (1981–96)

== See also ==
- Lascari, town in Sicily, Italy
- Lascar (disambiguation)
- Lashkar (disambiguation)
