= Heinrich Steiner =

German painter and printmaker

- Born: 16 October 1911; Kaiserslautern, Bavaria, German Empire
- Died: 29 January 2009 (aged 97); Rome, Italy
- Education: Academy of Fine Arts, Munich
- Known for: Painting
- Movement: Expressionism

Heinrich Steiner (October 16, 1911 – January 29, 2009) was a German painter and printmaker.

== Life and work ==
Heinrich Steiner was born 1911 in Kaiserslautern as a son of a theatre director. In 1926, he visited the college of arts and crafts in Altona, Hamburg and from 1927 to 1929 he learned scene painting in the Hamburg national theatre and the Berlin national theatre. Subsequently, he was active as a scene painter in the theatre "Am Gärtnerplatz" in Munich. From the year 1932 to 1934 he studied in the Academy of Fine Arts, Munich with Karl Caspar. He lived from 1934 and 1938 as a freelance painter in Düsseldorf and did study trips to Paris, Colmar, Strasbourg, Amsterdam and Zurich.

Heinrich Steiner left Germany in 1938 and went to Florence, where he joined the circle of German artists in Italy. A student of Henri Matisse - Rudolf Levy had particular influence on Steiner's art. In Florence, he studied at the Florentine Academy of Felice Carena and lived in the Guesthouse Bandini on the Piazza Santo Spirito in Florence, together with German artists such as Rudolf Levy and Eduard Bargheer. In 1939, he exhibited his paintings in Florence for the first time. Further exhibitions in Venice and Milan followed. In 1946, he is awarded the foreigner Prize "Premio Colomba" at the Biennale in Venice. On the same Biennale, Carlo Carrà and Massimo Campigli were awarded. The major Venetian art dealer Carlo Cardazzo took him under contract. In 1948, he moved to Venice. In 1949, the Cardazzo contract was not renewed and he returned to Florence.

In 1950, he married Giuliana Toti in Florence and returned to Germany, where he worked as a painter and art teacher. Steiner was a member of the secession art movement Palatinate, like Hans Purrmann, Edvard Frank and Will Sohl. In 1953 he is awarded the Palatinate Prize for Painting by the city of Kaiserslautern and an exhibition was held there. Further exhibitions were held at the Kunstverein Oldenburg, Westend Gallery Frankfurt, national art school in Mainz and the Gallery "l'attico esse arte" in Rome.

In 1974, Steiner moved back to Italy and lived and worked in Rome and Lerici. He died in Rome, Italy in 2009.
