= Lascăr Vorel =

Romanian Post-Impressionist painter

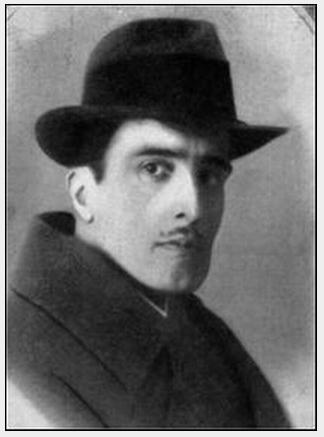
- Born: 19 August 1879; Iași, Principality of Romania
- Died: 8 February 1918 (aged 38); Munich, Kingdom of Bavaria, German Empire
- Education: Franz Stuck
- Known for: painting
- Movement: Art Nouveau; Post-Impressionism; Expressionism; Cubism; Tinerimea Artistică

Lascăr Vorel, also credited as Forel and Forell (19 August 1879 – 8 February 1918), was a Romanian Post-Impressionist painter whose style was linked to Expressionism. He was the scion of a pharmacist clan in Piatra Neamț, but abandoned the family trade to take up drawing, and became a student at Munich's Academy of Fine Arts. Praised as an intellectual as well as a painter, he moved away from Art Nouveau, studying Cubism and Expressionism, and exchanging ideas with a young Marcel Duchamp. Vorel also worked as a cartoonist for Der Komet magazine, befriending Albert Bloch, Hanns Bolz and Erich Mühsam, and frequenting Café Stefanie.

While active in immediate proximity to the early trends in German Expressionism, including Der Blaue Reiter, he never joined any artistic society. His avant-garde paintings, which often incorporated social commentary, alternated with more subdued and conventional landscapes and peasant portraits of Western Moldavia. Maintaining some interest in Romania's modern art scene, he was featured at Tinerimea Artistică shows and published sketch stories in Bucharest's literary magazines.

Ailing from a chronic kidney disease, Vorel lived a withdrawn existence during World War I. He maintained a lively interest in politics and military developments, expressing his continued support for the Central Powers; he was also increasingly pessimistic about the future of art, and about his own ability to thrive. This period brought him into contact with Romanian writer Nae Ionescu, who was his admirer and promoter, but Vorel's notebooks suggest that their friendship was superficial. Briefly interned as a hostile alien, Vorel turned to pacifism during his final years, ultimately dying in Munich at age 38. He remains celebrated in Piatra Neamț, where some of his diaries have been published, but is relatively unknown in Romania at large.

== Biography ==
=== Youth and formation ===
Born to Czech-Romanian parents at Iași, on Copou Hill, Lascăr was the great-grandson of Anton Vorel, a well-known herbalist who had arrived in Moldavia from the Kingdom of Bohemia. Anton had set up the main pharmacy of Piatra Neamț, which doubled as his medical practice; in tandem, he served as consular official for the Austrian Empire. The family business was preserved by Anton's grandson, Lascăr Sr, with the Vorels emerging as a family of note in the regional commercial upper class. They also owned land in Fălticeni, which they rented to the novelist and politician Mihail Sadoveanu c. 1906.

The future painter was born from Lascăr Sr's marriage to Julieta Suess. He spent much of his early life in Piatra, with his younger brothers Constantin and Tudor. Lascăr was the only one of his family not to be interested in pharmacy. Later in life, being almost entirely reliant on his family's financial support, he acknowledged that his pursuits were "anti-economical", that to society he appeared as an "infirm". However, he took pride in noting that his art was without "commercial sense". As he recalled in adulthood, his passion for drawing was first cultivated during his time at the Boys' School in Piatra, and was picked up from a talented schoolmate, Mărgărint, "my first and final master". He continued at the local gymnasium (where his professors included writer Calistrat Hogaș), but then moved to the other end of the country, in Turnu Severin, where he graduated from Traian High School.

Around 1896, Vorel was shortlisted for a national competition held at Tinerimea Artistică society in Bucharest—the event was also attended by Ignat Bednarik, a boy of Moravian Wallachian origin, who took first prize; despite their momentary rivalry, they became good friends. Taking up art as a full-time occupation, from 1899 or 1900 he studied in the German Empire, where he subsequently lived a long part of his life. According to his Romanian colleague Marius Bunescu, his family stipend allowed him to rent a "most beautiful artistic residence, one he would probably never have considered leaving." He was joined there by his brother Tudor, who enlisted at the Munich Polytechnic; the two of them made regular returns to Piatra, and went on fishing escapades along the Doamna River—Lascăr was passionate about this activity, and treasured advice received from elderly Moldavian fishermen.

The elder Vorel, who presided for a while over the Patria Romanian Students' Society, attended the Munich Academy, where he was taught by Franz Stuck. Stuck left notes celebrating Vorel's vision, originality, and "refined taste". From that moment on, Vorel developed a style influenced by the Vienna Secession and other branches of Art Nouveau, sending some of his works to be displayed by Tinerimea Artistică, which was by then the Secession's local equivalent. Other drawings, in cartoon form, were hosted by the Bucharest daily Adevărul, and by George Ranetti's satirical magazine, Furnica.

=== The innovator ===
According to Bunescu, Vorel was interested in carving his own artistic niche; therefore, despite being colleagues with Wassily Kandinsky, Vorel never joined Der Blaue Reiter. One of his early admirers was journalist-philosopher Nae Ionescu, who discovered his "surprising newness and high intellectualism", viewing his "tormented" art as a record of Vorel's own existential struggles. Overall, Ionescu argues, Vorel was "one of the most exquisite exemplars of Romanian spirituality." As noted by critic Valentin Ciucă, Vorel was both a shy man with a "complex interior life" and a modernizer, "interested in artistic synchronism, with all newness that existed in art at the start of the century." Another critic, Petru Comarnescu, argues that Vorel was above all an "intellectual painter" with a "tragic sense of self." In addition to painting and drawing, he was a published writer of sketch stories. These include Măestrul meu ("My Masterful"), taken up by Viața Literară și Artistică journal (1908), as well as a series in Noua Revistă Română (1913). According to Ionescu, this literary production had "vanished" from public memory within a decade.

In 1908–1909, Vorel became interested in Expressionism while attending exhibits of works by Vincent van Gogh, Paul Cézanne, and Henri Matisse. His artistic vision fully incorporated Cézanne's geometrical guidelines, resulting in what writer Dumitru Iov viewed as "moderate cubism". Also according to Iov, Vorel was masterful in his 1914 canvass The Card Players. By then, Vorel had met Max Beckmann, who drew his portrait in charcoal. He was also in contact with Albert Bloch, an American member of Der Blaue Reiter. In 1910–1912 Vorel, Bloch and Hanns Bolz worked as cartoonists for a satirical magazine, Der Komet, which was probably conceived of in Munich's Café Stefanie; the editor was anarchist writer Erich Mühsam, who regularly played chess with Vorel. It was as a result of Vorel's intercession that Der Komet also published cartoons by another Romanian, Nicolae Mantu. He was in contact with another co-national, and fellow student, Nicolae Tonitza, and, as Comarnescu argues, greatly influenced Tonitza's own approach to art. The two men were sharing a studio, and were photographed in it, in or around 1910. Their Romanian friends also included painter Grigore Negoșanu and aviation pioneer Aurel Vlaicu.

Vorel was at the time dating cabaret singer Maria "Mucki" Berger (or Bergé). In these circles, Vorel also met Marcel Duchamp, who lived close to his home on Blütenstrasse. This encounter, mediated by painter "Max Bergmann" (identified by Ciucă as Beckmann), may have helped to radicalize Duchamp's vision on art. Later in the 1910s, Bloch and Vorel were close friends; they visited each other's studios and drew portraits of one other, with Bloch becoming one of the main recipients of Vorel's canvasses (granted to him as gifts).

Although Vorel ultimately refused to join any particular group of artists, his work shares common traits with that of several German Expressionists—including George Grosz, Otto Dix, and Oskar Kokoschka. Many of his paintings are satirical in theme, and center on grotesque caricatures of bourgeois society or its entertainers. Most of them are painted in gouache, and are dominated by blue, grey, and violet tones. His main stylistic choice was contrasted by works depicting his home region: concentrating on wider compositions and landscapes which included more emotional portraits of peasants and artisans, he made use of lighter tones of color. Journalist Constantin Dănciuloiu found these works to be reminiscent of two classical painters, Jean-Baptiste Greuze and Nicolae Grigorescu; another reviewer, I. Cristian, suggests that they were characterized mostly by a "tarnished" palette of "worn-down vegetation". An "exotic note" was only reached in his Portret de femeie ("A Woman's Portrait"), which, Cristian argues, had echoes from Paul Gauguin.

=== Final years ===
Ionescu finally met Vorel in person during early 1914; the two men were possibly reunited in the first half of 1916, which is probably the time-frame for Vorel's only portrait of Ionescu. He described the painter as having an "enormous forehead", "seemingly ready to burst open from the painful pressure of a lingering thought." This self-reflection was "sadistic", because Vorel was always returning to the same conclusion: that old creative forms were no longer sufficient to the modern mindset. After watching Vorel work on his canvasses, Ionescu proposed that his was not painting as much as a "problem-solving" activity. Vorel's private papers document his bouts of anger and depression; in 1915, he described his trade as a form of "clowning around", noting that, at any moment, "hell can reign upon my dwarfish life". He noted that "desperate" work was his only method of fending off uncertainty and isolation, but also that the canvasses he still sent to be exhibited by Tinerimea were purposefully sketch-like or unfinished. Ionescu reports that Vorel consulted the Tinerimea catalogue during a regular meeting at Café Stefanie—passing it around to his German colleagues, including Bloch, Bolz, Franz Marc, and Frank Wedekind. Almost all were reportedly impressed with one work by Ion Theodorescu-Sion.

Upon the outbreak of World War I, Vorel became an enthusiastic supporter of his adoptive Germany and of the Central Powers in general. In his private correspondence, he argued that Germans were "called upon to rule over the world", being especially impressed by Germany's submarine tactics. Vorel commented that peaceful civilization was illusory, and that hatred was the "fundamental habitus of living creatures". He also equated a German victory with the onset of modernization, leading to a "massive output of creative energy". While Romania still kept neutral, Vorel derided its pro-Allied agitators, including Octavian Goga and Ioan Toplicescu, endorsing instead the pro-German Petre P. Carp. As he noted in June 1915, Carp's newspaper Moldova was the only thing worth reading.

By April 1916, Ionescu was asking Vorel to consider publishing more literary contributions in Noua Revistă Română. One of the artist's private records suggests that he and Mucki were growing disappointed with "our pal I."—perhaps the same Ionescu—, who would feign sickness to demand money from the cash-strapped couple. Battling a chronic disease of the kidneys, Vorel followed "a strict diet and a sedentary regimen." During early 1916, he complained that "my old sore in the loins" was giving him problems in the left ear, and seemingly pushing him into deafness. He was also demanding that his family send him more money to pay for a temporary retreat to the countryside, but noted that he was still working on his circus-themed canvasses.

Partly prepared by Bloch, his last exhibit came during summer 1916, at a Munch venue he shared with Erich Heckel. Vorel wrote home to announce that he was engaged to Mucki. The historical context for both these events proved challenging, since, at roughly the same time, Romania was mobilizing to declare war on the Central Powers. Vorel was angered when announcements for his exhibit introduced him as "the Romanian Lascăr Vorel", noting: "this highlighting of my nationality can't possibly serve me in the present circumstances". Bunescu recalls that the Romanian engagement resulted in Vorel's internment as a hostile foreigner, which "shortened his lifespan". From 1917, he was reunited with Bolz, who had been injured during a chemical attack and was recovering in Munich. By then, Vorel had incorporated pacifist protests into his paintings, making them was the last major themes of his art. His death occurred on 8 February 1918 at the Schwabing Hospital in Munich. His kidney disease is cited as his ultimate cause.

== Legacy ==
The artist's remains were incinerated and kept in an urn by his mother; upon her death in January 1942, they were interred alongside her at Eternitatea Cemetery in Piatra. Bloch mourned his death in a sonnet, which describes the event as being "without farewell or warning", suggesting that Vorel had purposefully isolated himself from his friends. He bought and took back to America several of Vorel's Munich cityscapes; one is at the Spencer Museum of Art. Many other works are preserved in Austria, and still others were completely lost by 1968. The Vorel diaries were recovered, and are preserved in the Piatra Neamț Museum of History archives. In October 1924, Ionescu sought to revived interest in Vorel's work with a tribute piece in Cuvântul daily. It urged Bunescu, by then an official painter, to organize a Vorel posthumous exhibit, since "nobody knows his paintings, and that's a shame." In 1939, the Social Service of the National Renaissance Front sponsored a retrospective of Vorel's Romanian works, hosted by Piatra's Petru Rareș National College.

As Forel, Lascăr features briefly in the memoirs of Nell Walden, published in 1954. Vorel's brothers were the last generation to own the Vorel pharmacy practice before its nationalization by the communist regime; several members of the family spent time in communist prisons during the 1950s, although Tudor was kept as factory manager. In 1958 the regime allowed a Vorel exhibition to be hosted by a Bucharest gallery. This was curated by Petru Comarnescu who, in 1968, also put out the first Vorel monograph at Editura Meridiane, introducing him as both a Romanian artist who "never fit in with German art" and a "modern humanist". In his own diary, Comarnescu noted that he was mainly interested in Vorel because he offered glimpses into the "Munich's atmosphere of artistic avant-garde in 1910–1917." By 1975, the Neamț County Museum Complex had received funding to purchase Vorel's Romanian paintings, exhibiting them alongside other acquisitions (from Aurel Băeșu, Aurelia Ghiață, and Constantin Daniel Stahi). In 1979, the National Museum of Art of Romania purchased two of Vorel's café-chantant scenes for its permanent collection. The family's contribution was again recognized from 1983, when a pharmaceutical company took the name Plantavorel.

Recovery efforts continued after the fall of communism in 1989. By April 1993, his more Expressionistic paintings were featured in a retrospective of the Romanian avant-garde, at the National Theater Bucharest's Artexpo Hall. Since May 1993, Piatra Neamț has hosted a Lascăr Vorel Gallery (founded by phililogist Adrian Alui Gheorghe as part of the Neamț Museum). It is the center of a "Vorel Biennale" exhibiting works by contemporary painters. By 2003, some of Vorel's works were also featured in a private museum at Târpești, founded by Neculai Popa (a former soldier, political prisoner of the communists, and author of esoteric literature). A sample from the painter's diaries, covering the year 1916, finally appeared at Piatra in 2009. Commemorating 100 years since Vorel's death, the Asachi Library of Iași noted that, though an "innovator of art in Romania, as well as worldwide", Vorel remained "quite unfamiliar to art lovers".

== Gallery ==
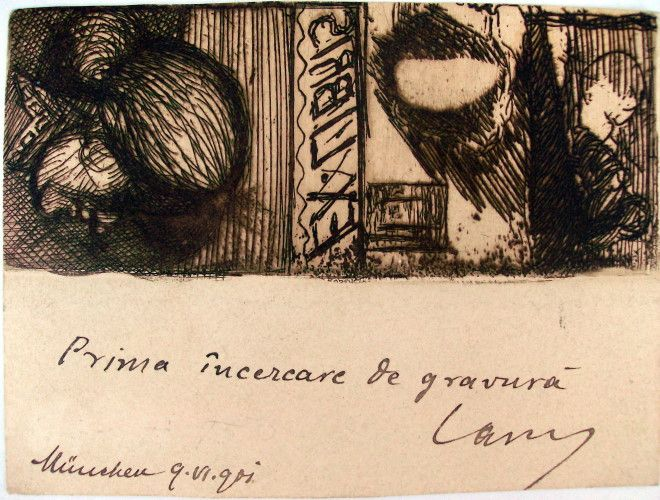
My First Attempt at Engraving, 1901 bookplate

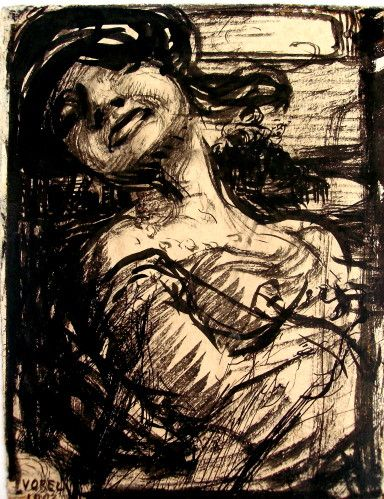
Portrait of a Woman, 1903

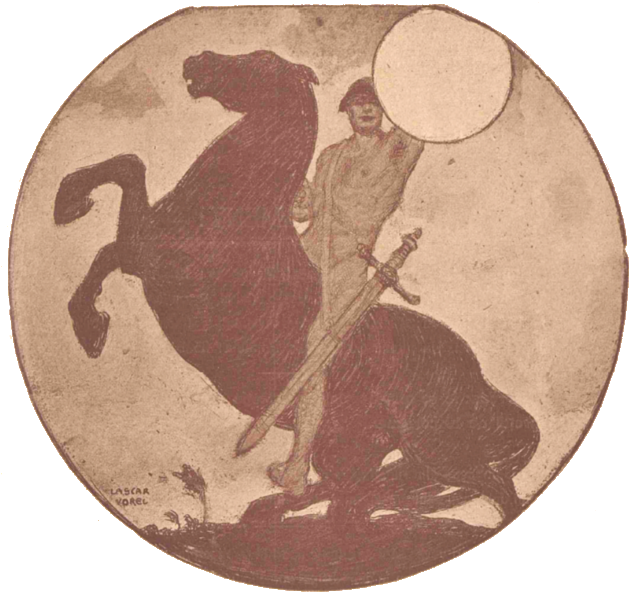
1904 cover for Luceafărul

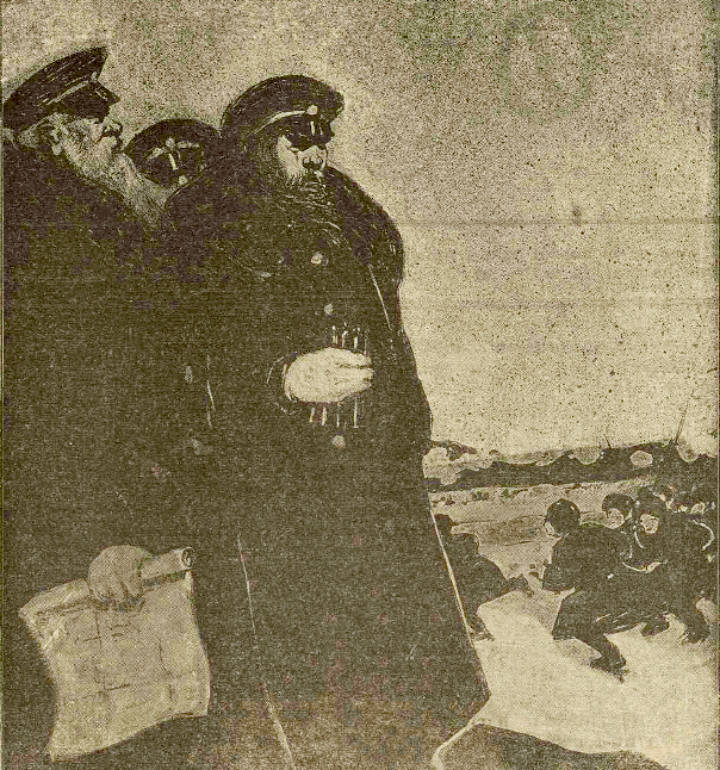
1905 cartoon in Furnica

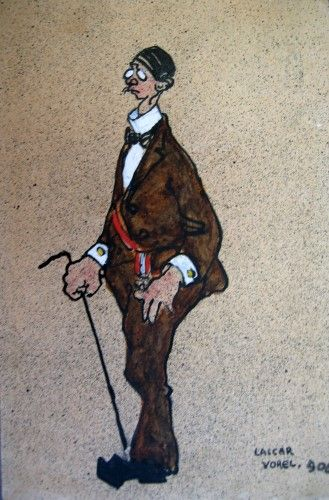
The Student, 1906

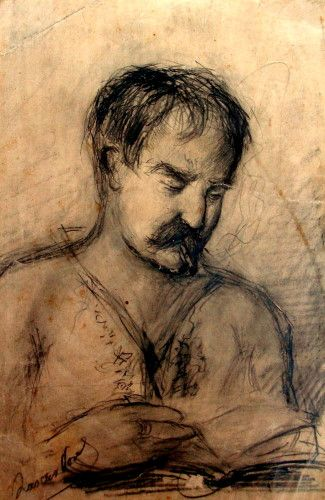
Portrait of My Father, 1907

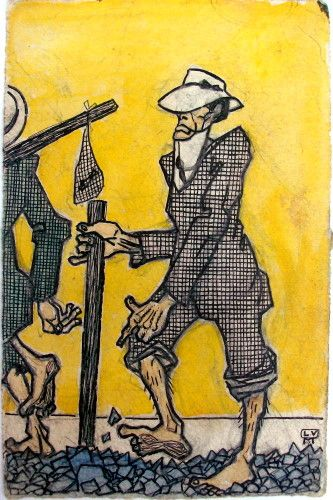
The Path of the Painter (self-portrait), 1907

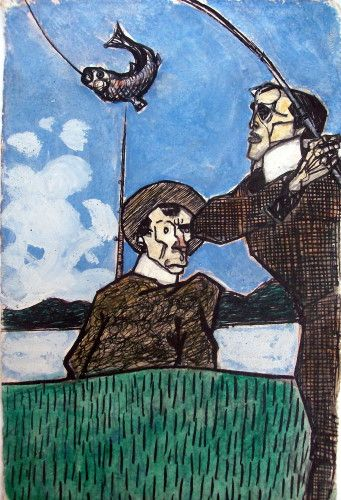
Fishermen, 1907

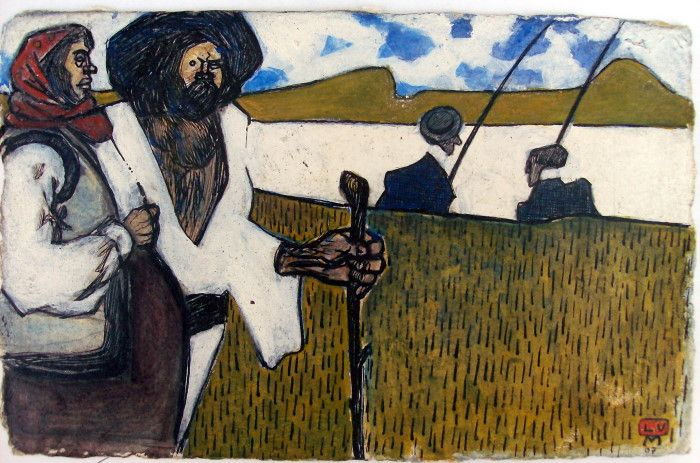
A Contrast, 1907

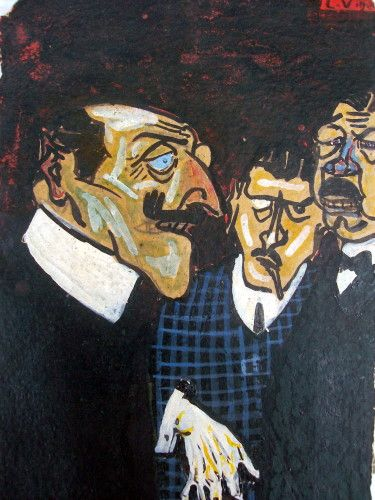
The Hawk; Businessmen, 1907

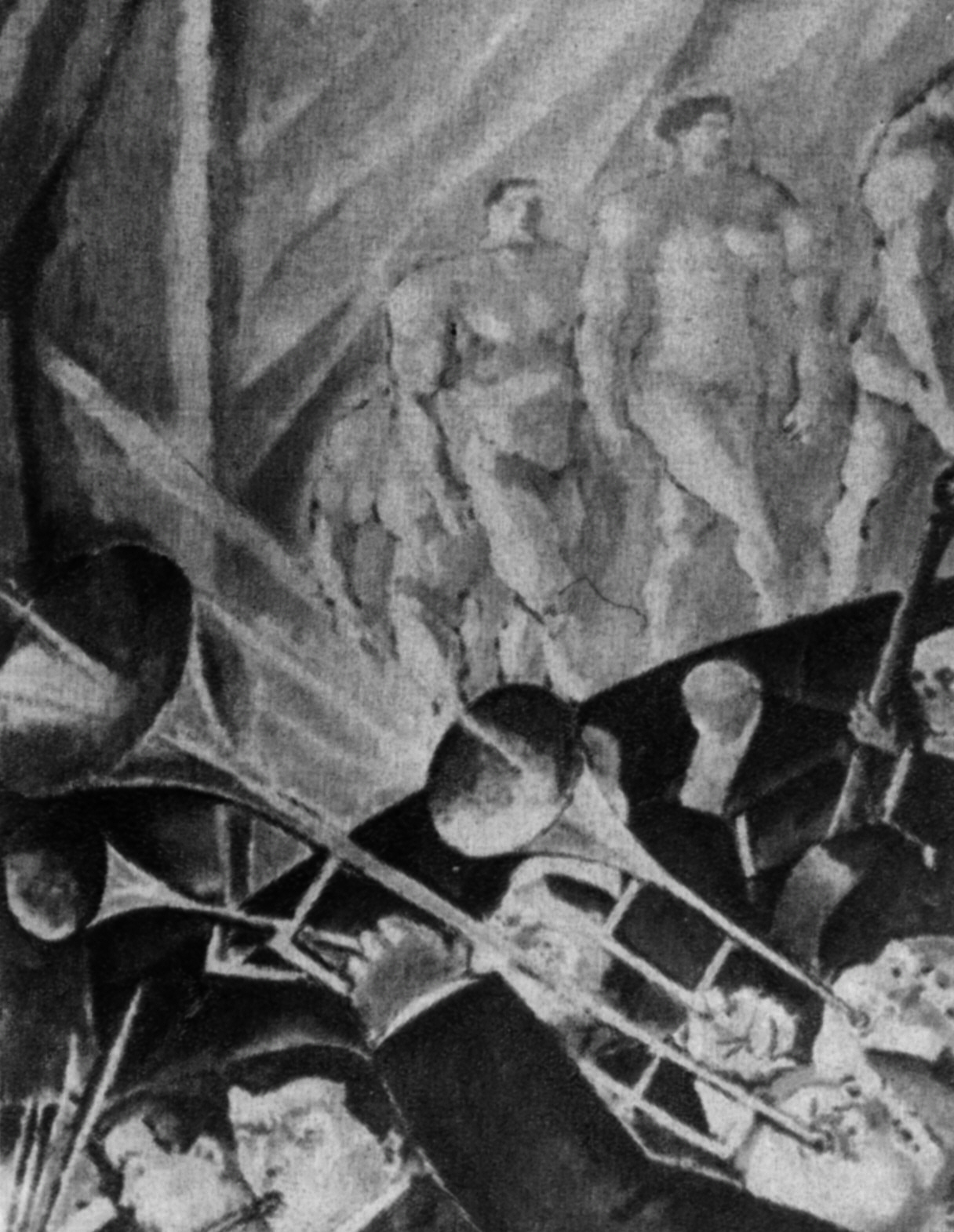
The Acrobats

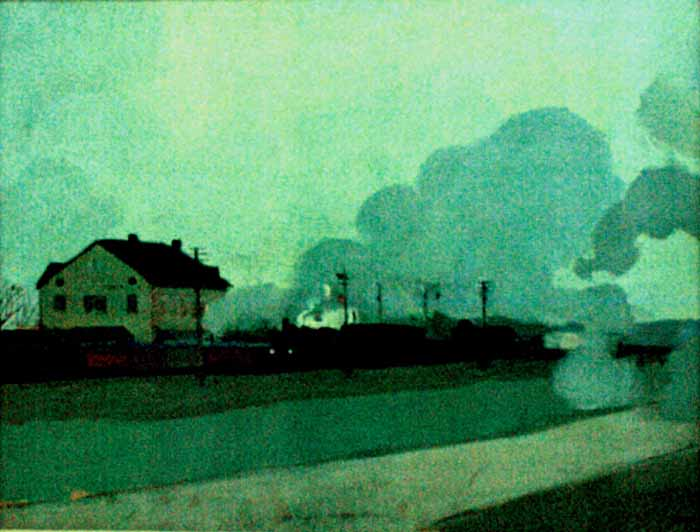
Train Station

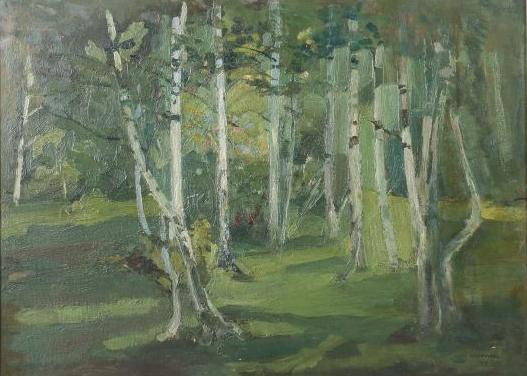
1909 landscape

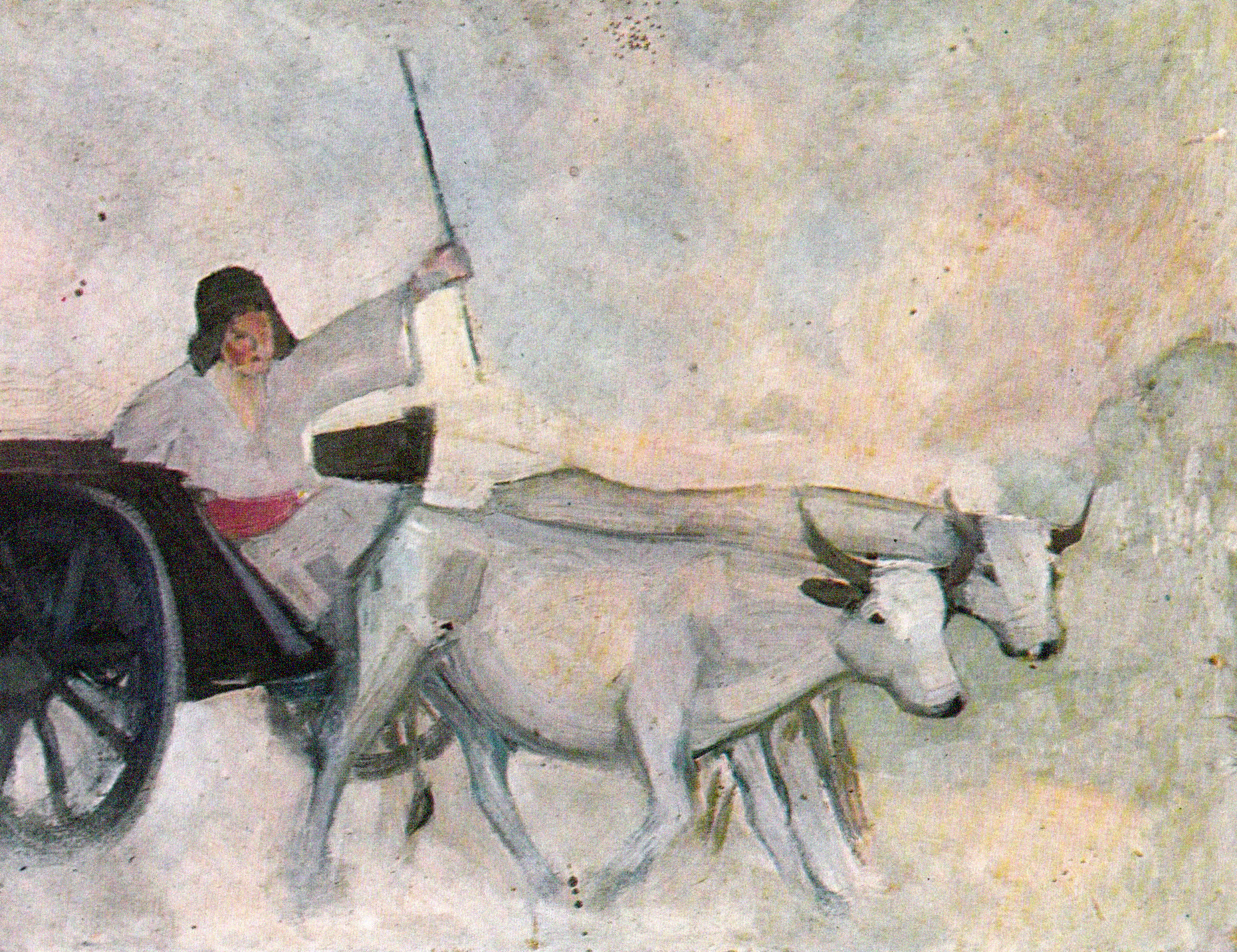
Oxcart

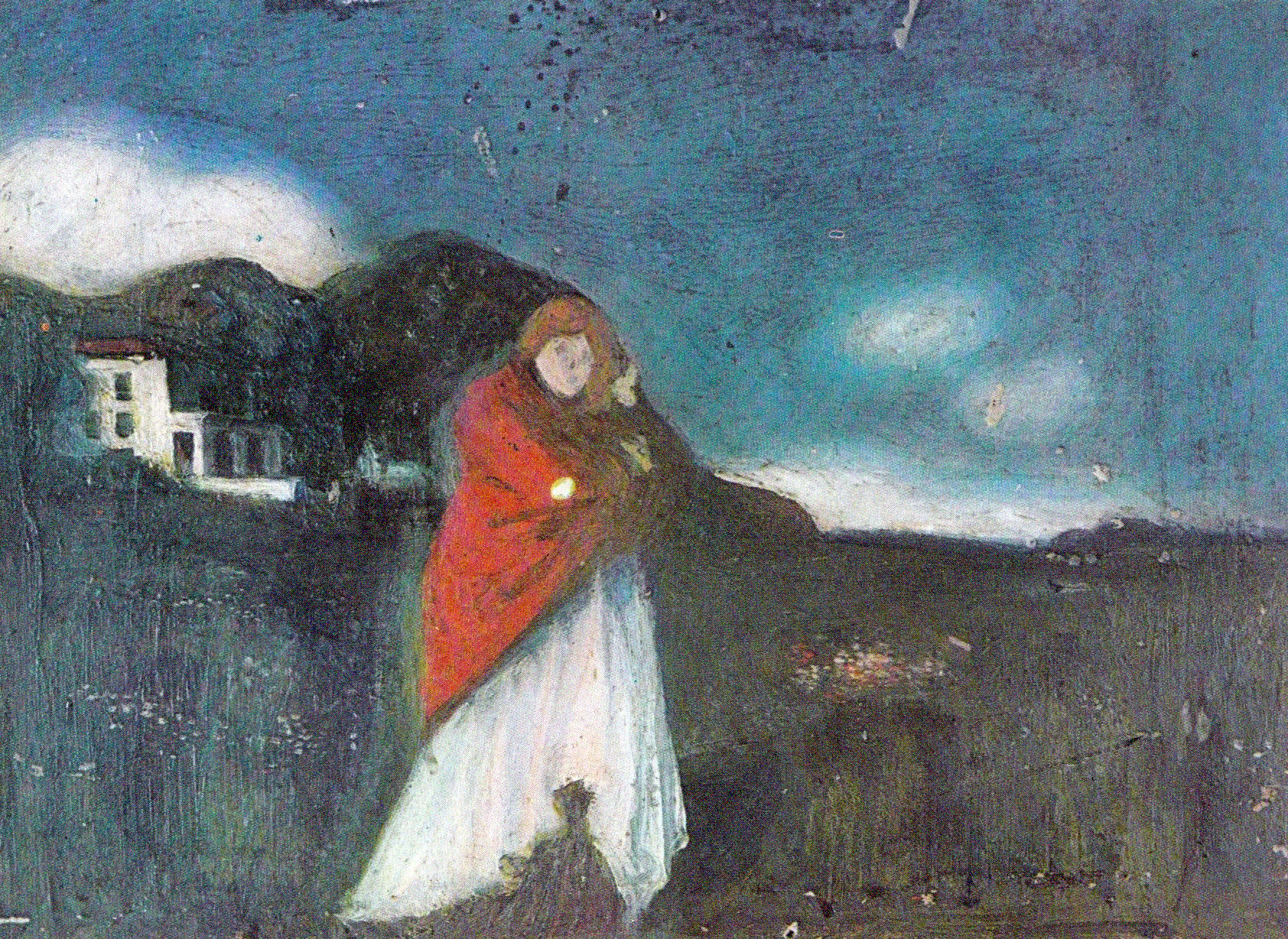
Woman in Red Cape

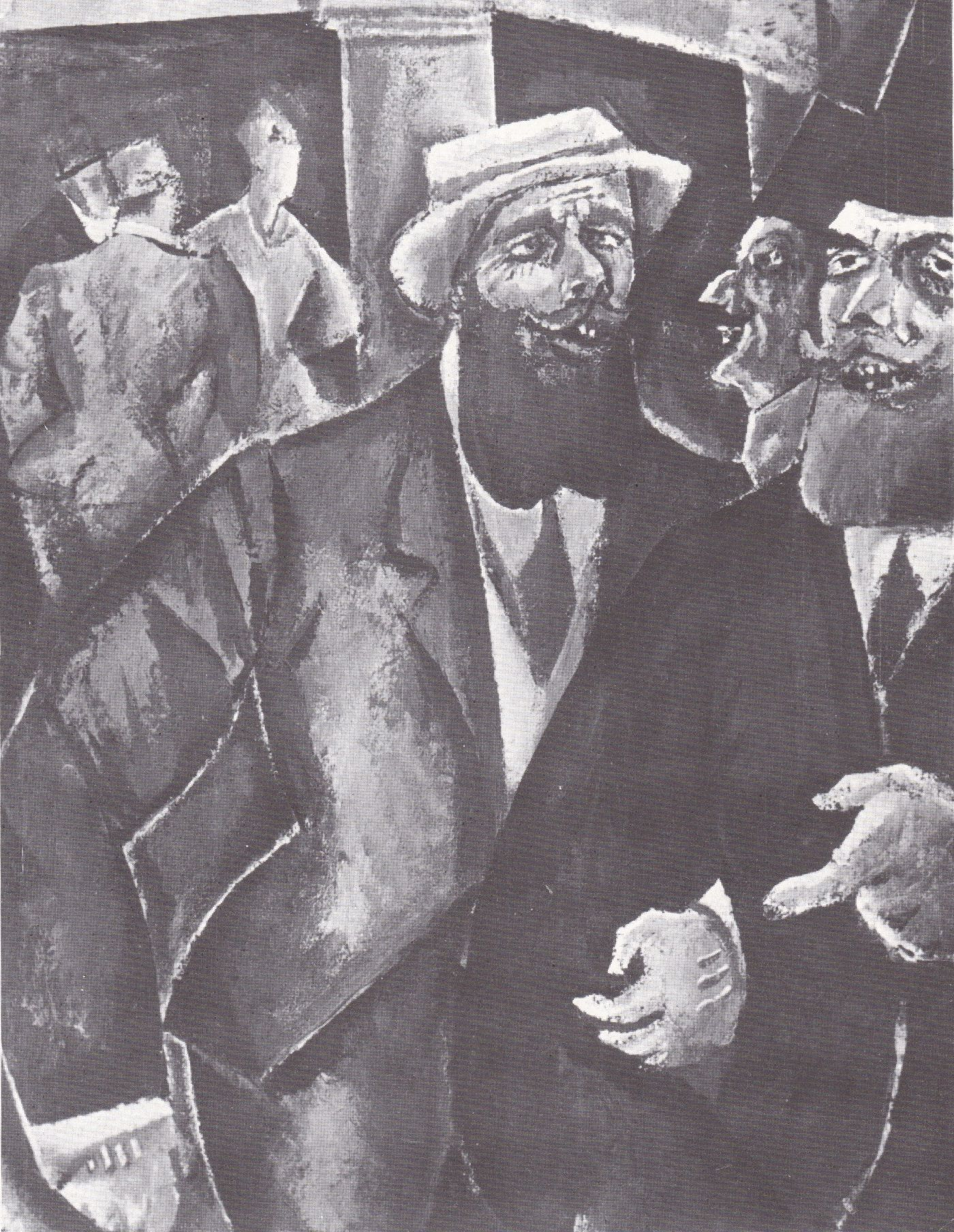
Havas Agency

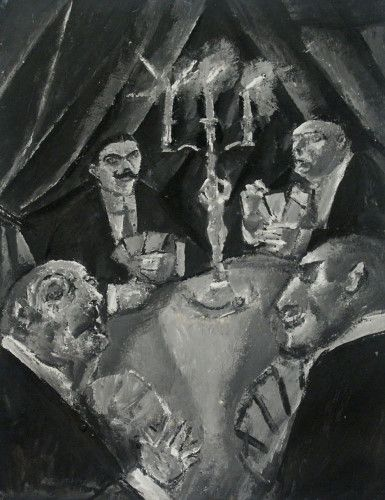
Card Players, 1914

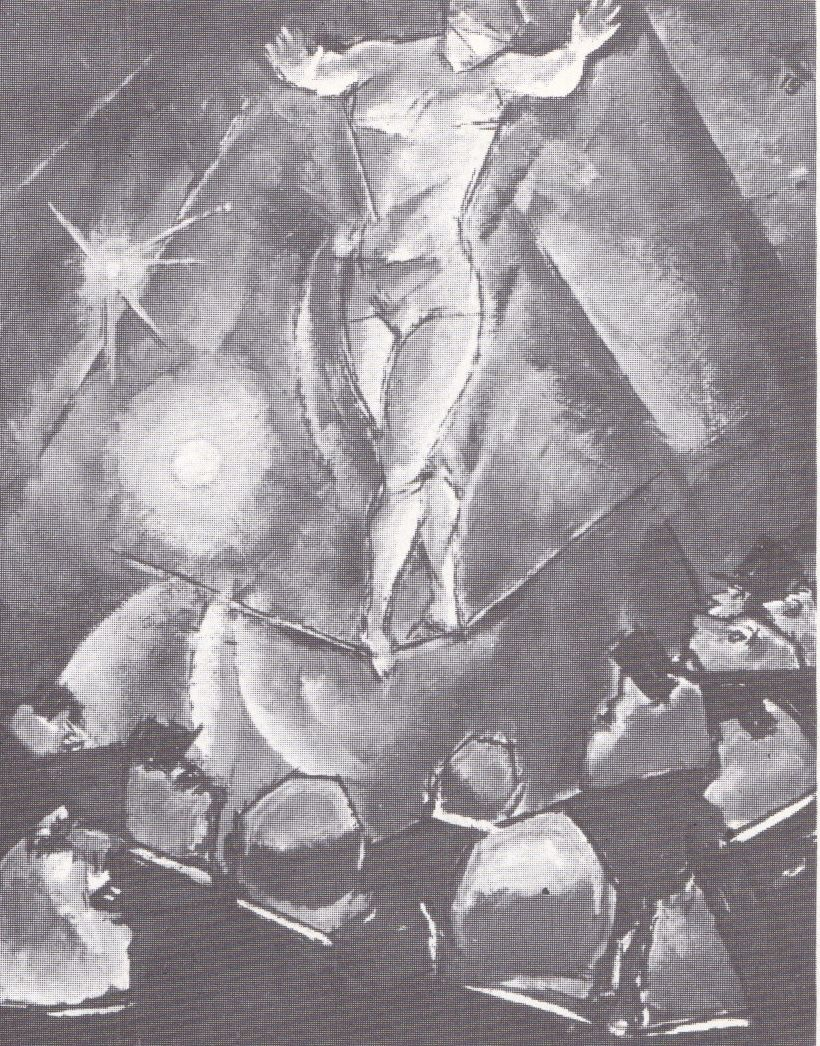
Circus Scene

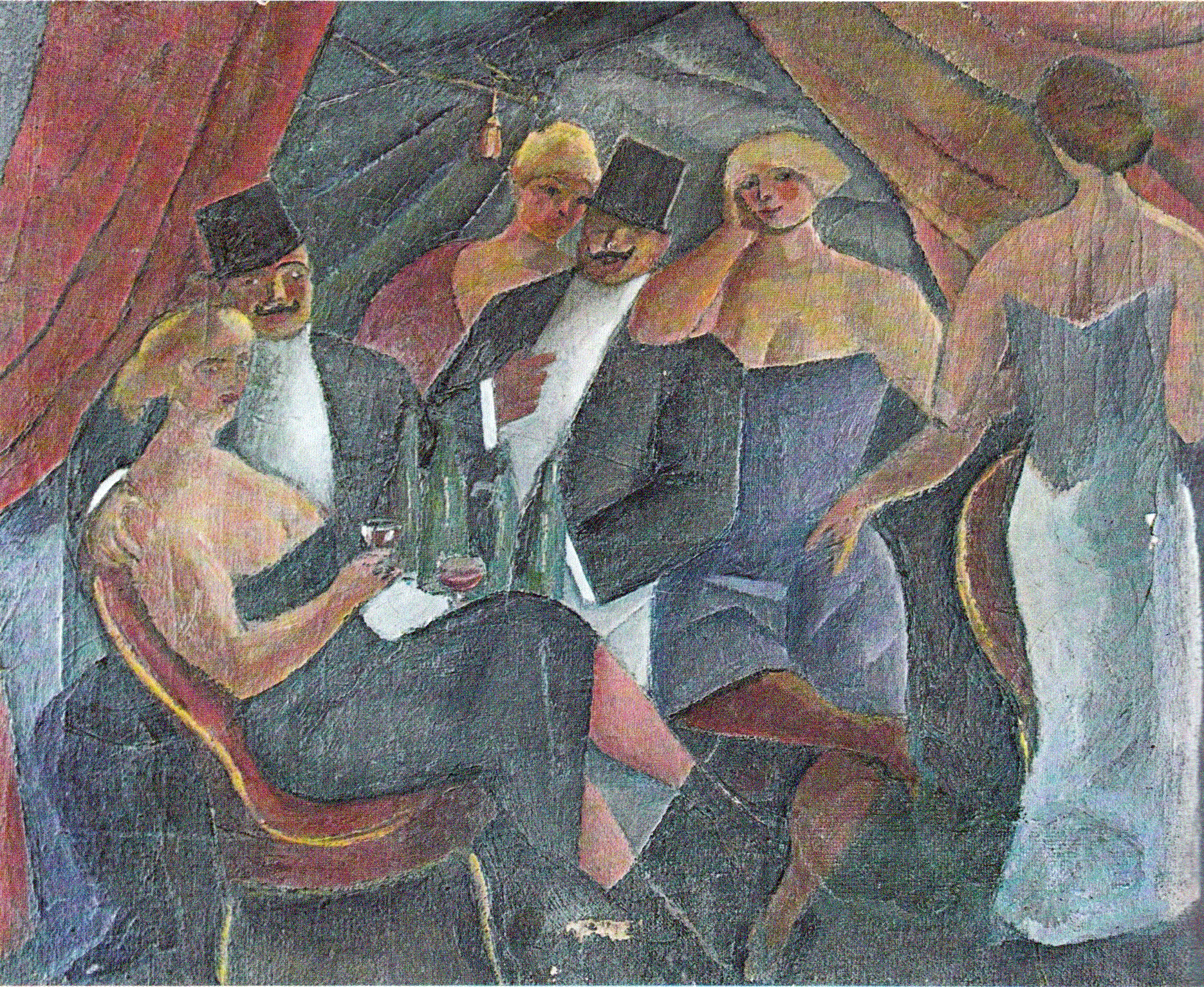
In the Booth

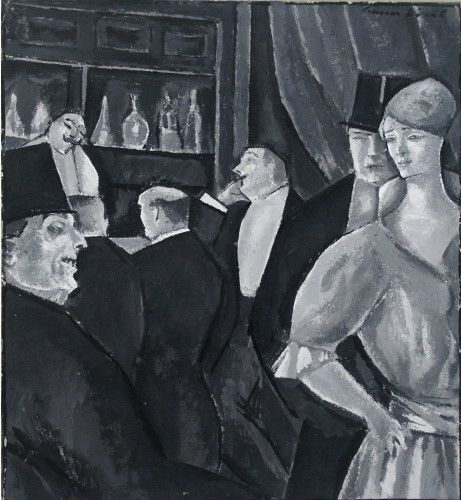
The Bar

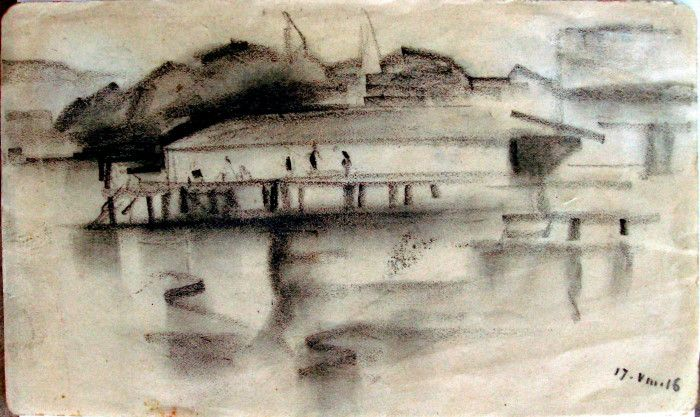
Herrsching am Ammersee, 1916

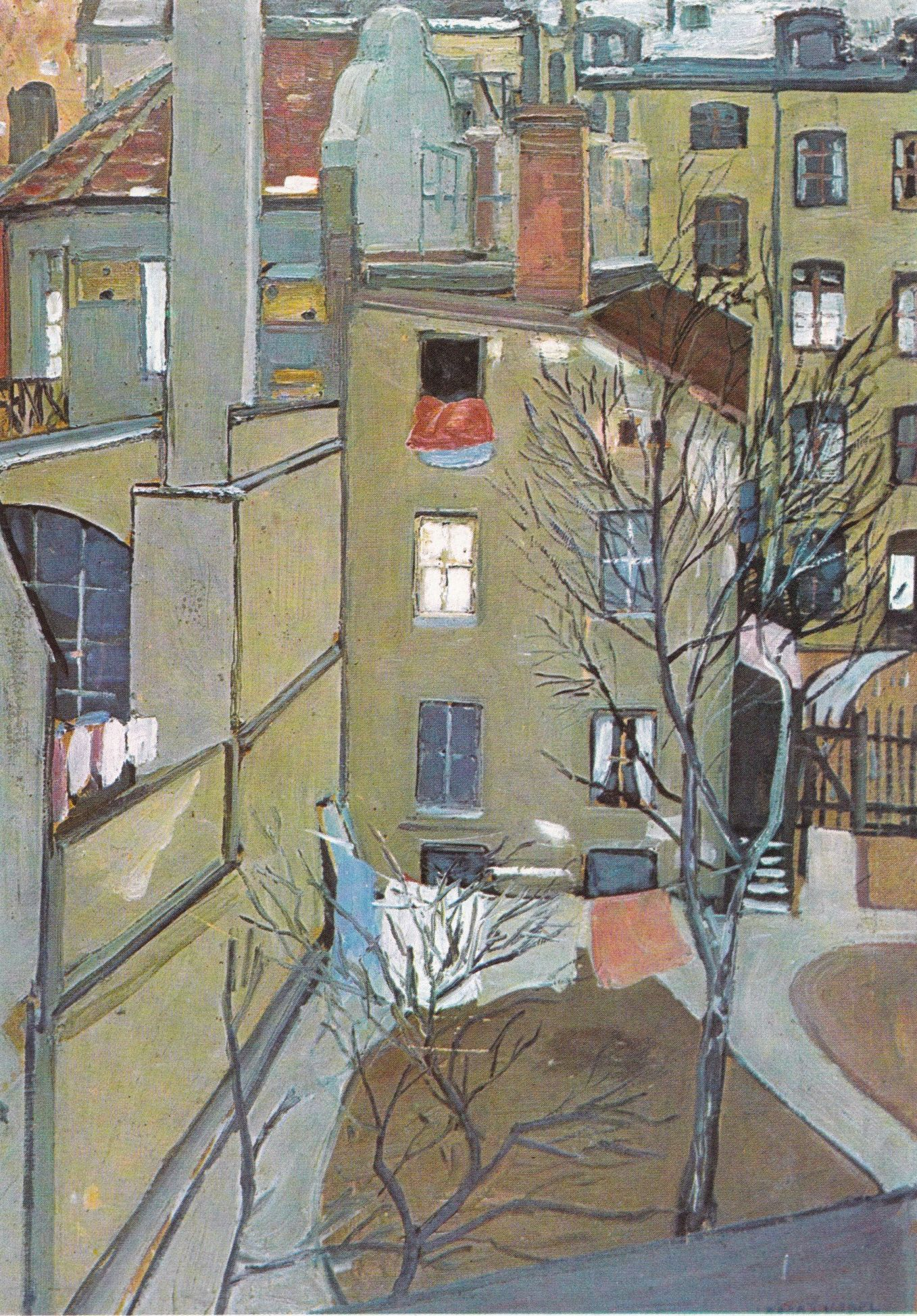
The View from My Studio
