= Hermine Moos =

German dollmaker and painter

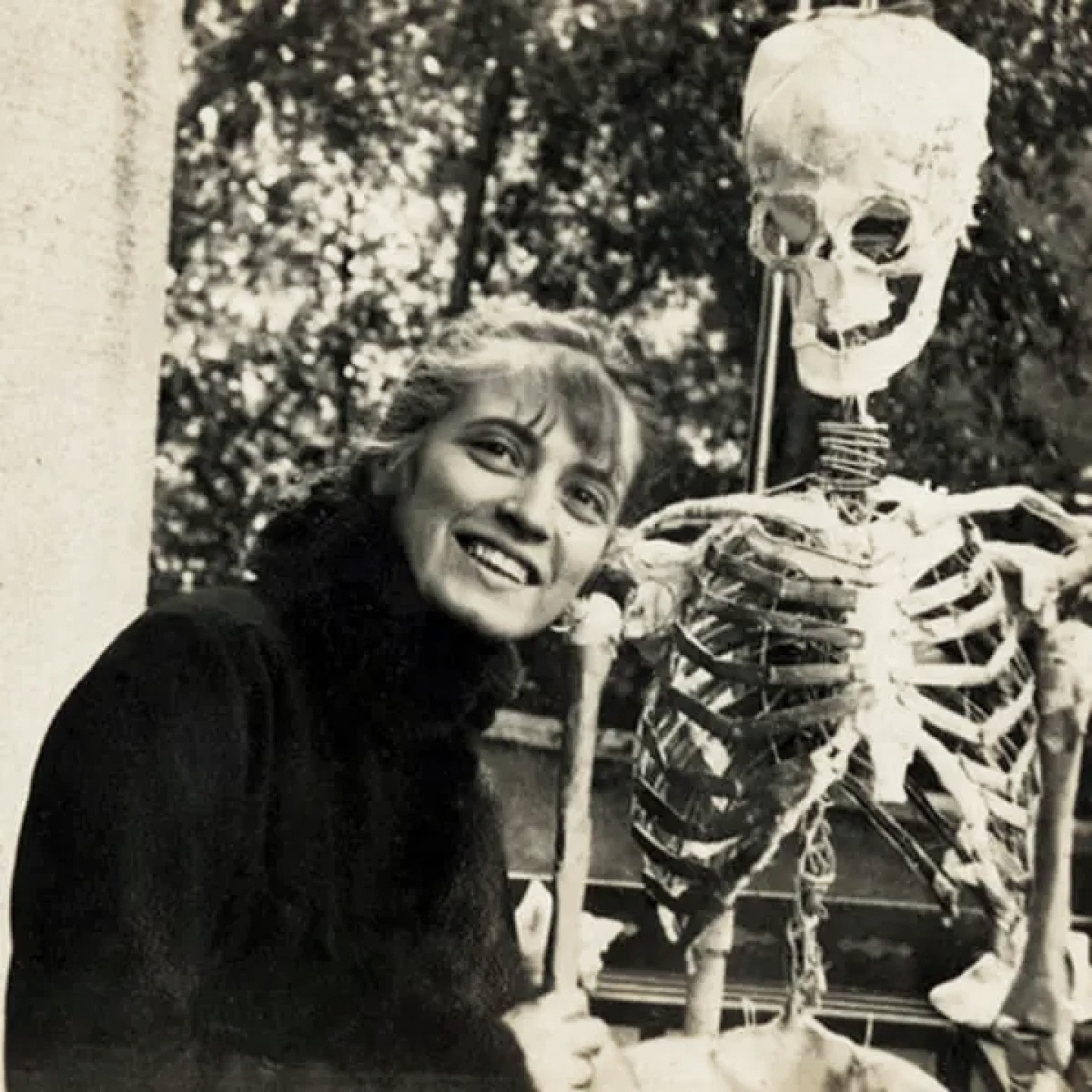
- Moos in 1918
- Born: 12 August 1888; Frankfurt, German Empire
- Died: 15 August 1928 (aged 40); Munich, Germany
- Known for: The Alma Mahler Doll

Hermine Moos (12 August 1888 – 15 August 1928) was a German painter and dollmaker. Moos is best known for creating a life-sized doll for the Austrian artist Oskar Kokoschka between 1918 and 1919.

The doll was created to resemble Kokoschka's former lover, the composer Alma Mahler. While Kokoschka was extremely specific about his desires for the doll's appearance, Moos did not follow his specifications and used feathered swan skin to serve as the doll's skin. No other examples of her work survive.

== Life ==
Moos was born on 12 August 1888 in Frankfurt, Germany (then the German Empire). Her father was Max Moos, an affluent Jewish engineer from Baden, and her mother was Sophie Moos (née Sundheimer), who came from a family of Jewish artisans. Her younger sister, Henriette, was born on 10 February 1890.

In 1913, the Moos family briefly moved to Heidelberg; they moved again in 1914 to Munich, where Hermine would spend the rest of her life. In 1917, the Moos family relocated to an apartment in the borough of Schwabing, where Hermine would presumably create the Alma Mahler Doll. During this time, Moos would occasionally show her work at museums and salons; this is additionally when the painter Oskar Kokoschka became aware of her work through their mutual friends, Gerhard Pagel and the dollmaker Lotte Pritzl.

Little is known about Moos' later life, except that she assisted in the renovations of the Bavarian National Museum's costume department in the early 1920s. Moos died on 12 August 1928, at the age of 40.

== The Alma Mahler Doll ==
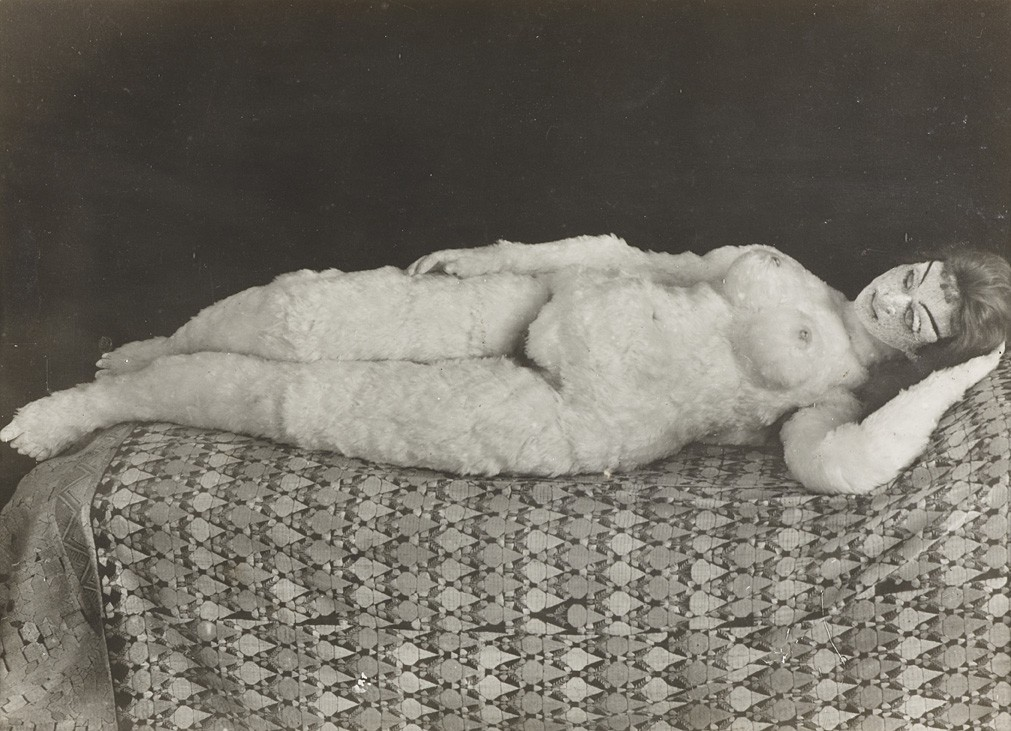
The Alma Mahler Doll following its completion in 1919

Shortly after her husband Gustav Mahler died in 1911, Alma Mahler met Oskar Kokoschka and the pair began a passionate relationship. Alma eventually left Kokoschka in 1914 due to his obsessiveness and possessiveness. However, Kokoschka was still desperately obsessed with Alma, and he eventually attempted to commission the dollmaker Lotte Pritzl to make a doll that looked like her; Pritzl rejected his commission upon viewing the sketches. Kokoschka then wrote to Moos, who accepted his commission in the summer of 1918. He may have selected Moos because she was rumored to have formerly served as Alma Mahler's seamstress.

The doll's creation process overlapped with the end of World War I, the November Revolution, and the collapse of the German Empire, which made many supplies difficult to procure, particularly linen and silk. Regardless, Kokoschka was incredibly insistent that the doll adhere to his elaborate design plans. Throughout the entire process, he communicated frequently with Moos and sent her multiple sketches and paintings of Alma. Moos would send back materials samples for Kokoschka to see and feel. He wanted the skin to be made of peach-colored silk, real human hair for the doll's head, the pubic hair to be made of curly horsehair reclaimed from a couch, and the breasts and buttocks to be stuffed with cotton filling. Kokoschka was specifically preoccupied with the doll's breasts and vagina being realistic; he instructed Moos to masturbate instead of utilizing anatomical diagrams during the creation process. Why Moos accepted the commission, or what she thought about it, is unknown.

=== Following completion ===
After nine months of work, Moos completed the doll in February 1919. According to a designer who recreated the doll, it was likely 160 centimetres (63 in) and may have weighed over 30 kilograms (66 lb). It was covered in feathered swan skin and filled with sawdust. Upon receiving the doll, Kokoschka, who had been eagerly awaiting his "princess of fantasy" was devastated. He called it a "rag doll" and said it looked like it was covered in "polar bear fur." He additionally complained that he could not easily dress the doll in human clothing— one of his primary desires.

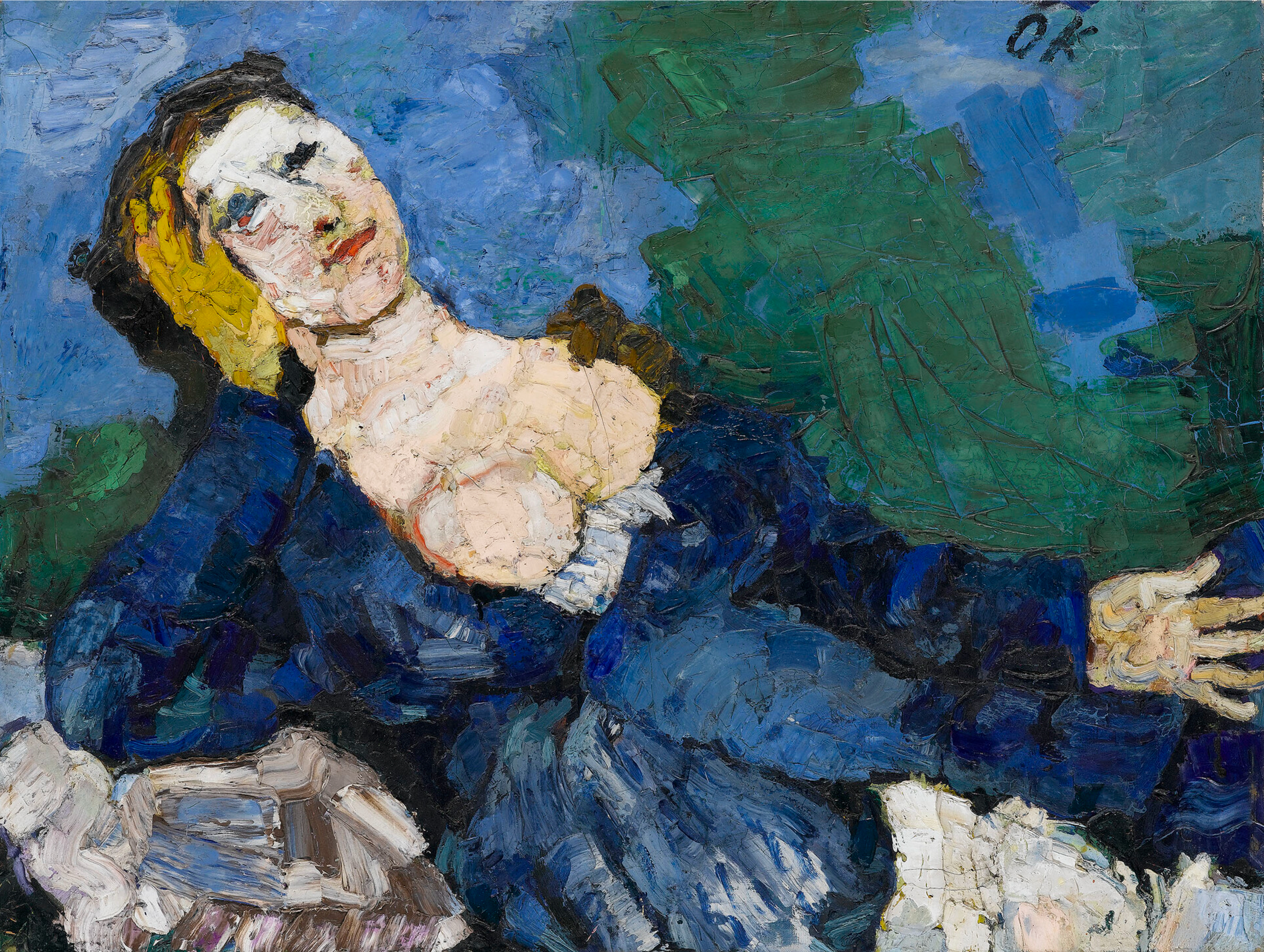
Woman in Blue, an oil painting by Oskar Kokoschka depicting the Alma Mahler Doll reclining in a dress

However, Kokoschka decided to keep the doll and use it as originally planned. He created photos, sketches, and paintings of the doll in various poses and articles of clothing, including three major paintings: Woman in Blue (1919), Painter with Doll (1920–21), and At the Easel (1922). He hired a maid named Hulda to care for and clothe it, slept with it in bed, and took it to cafés, parties, and operas. In the 1920s, he claimed that the doll had "cured" him of his passion for Alma and he decided to destroy it. He threw a party; had Hulda dress the doll in its finest clothes; and then dragged it out into the garden, decapitated it, and broke a bottle of wine over its head.

== See also ==
- Sex doll
- Pygmalion
- Agalmatophilia
