= Peter-Christoph Runge =

German operatic baritone (1933–2010)

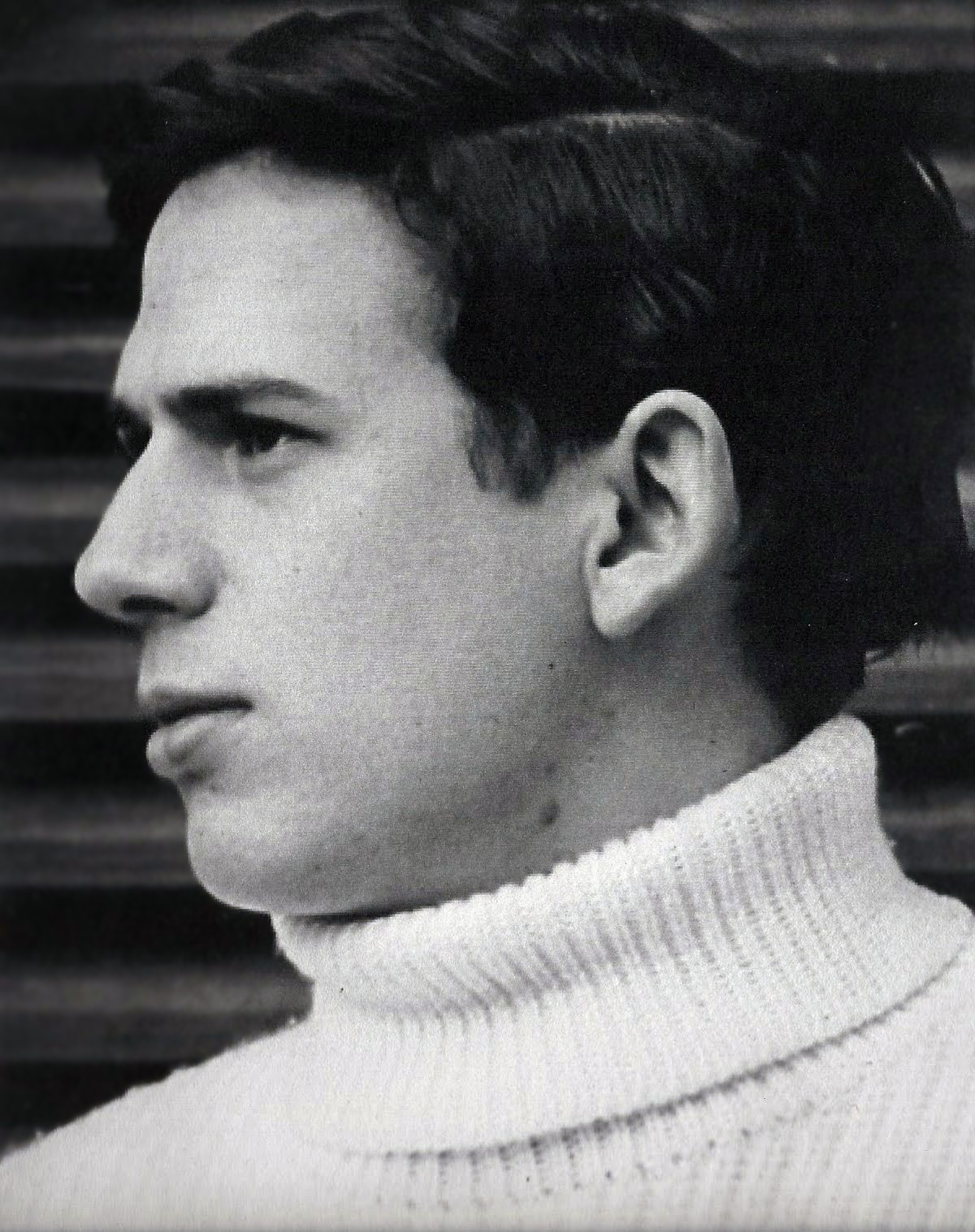
- Runge in 1958
- Born: 12 April 1933; Lübeck, Germany
- Died: 25 June 2010 (aged 77); Verviers, Belgium
- Education: Musikhochschule Hamburg
- Occupations: Operatic baritone; Academic teacher
- Organizations: Deutsche Oper am Rhein; Robert Schumann Hochschule Düsseldorf; Hochschule für Musik und Tanz Köln

Peter-Christoph Runge (12 April 1933 – 25 Juni 2010) was a German operatic baritone and academic teacher. His repertoire in recital, concert and opera is from Renaissance to contemporary music. Based at the Deutsche Oper am Rhein for 46 years, he appeared internationally. He taught at the Robert Schumann Hochschule Düsseldorf and at the Aachen division of the Hochschule für Musik und Tanz Köln.

== Life and career ==
Runge was born in Lübeck on 12 April 1933. As a boy he was a member of the Lübecker Knabenkantorei, already performing solos. He trained to be a bookbinder, completing in 1957 and then studying music, German literature and philosophy.

He studied voice at the Musikhochschule Hamburg and furthered his studies with Heinrich Steiner in Flensburg from 1958. He made his stage debut in Flensburg as Guglielmo in Mozart's Così fan tutte in 1958. He became a member of the ensemble of the Oper Wuppertal in 1959 and moved in 1964 to the Deutsche Oper am Rhein where he remained for 46 years. He was member of the ensemble until 1998.

He appeared as a guest internationally, at the Glyndebourne Festival from 1966, first as Papageno in Mozart's Die Zauberflöte, at the Salzburg Festival, the Edinburgh Festival, the Berliner Festwochen and the Holland Festival

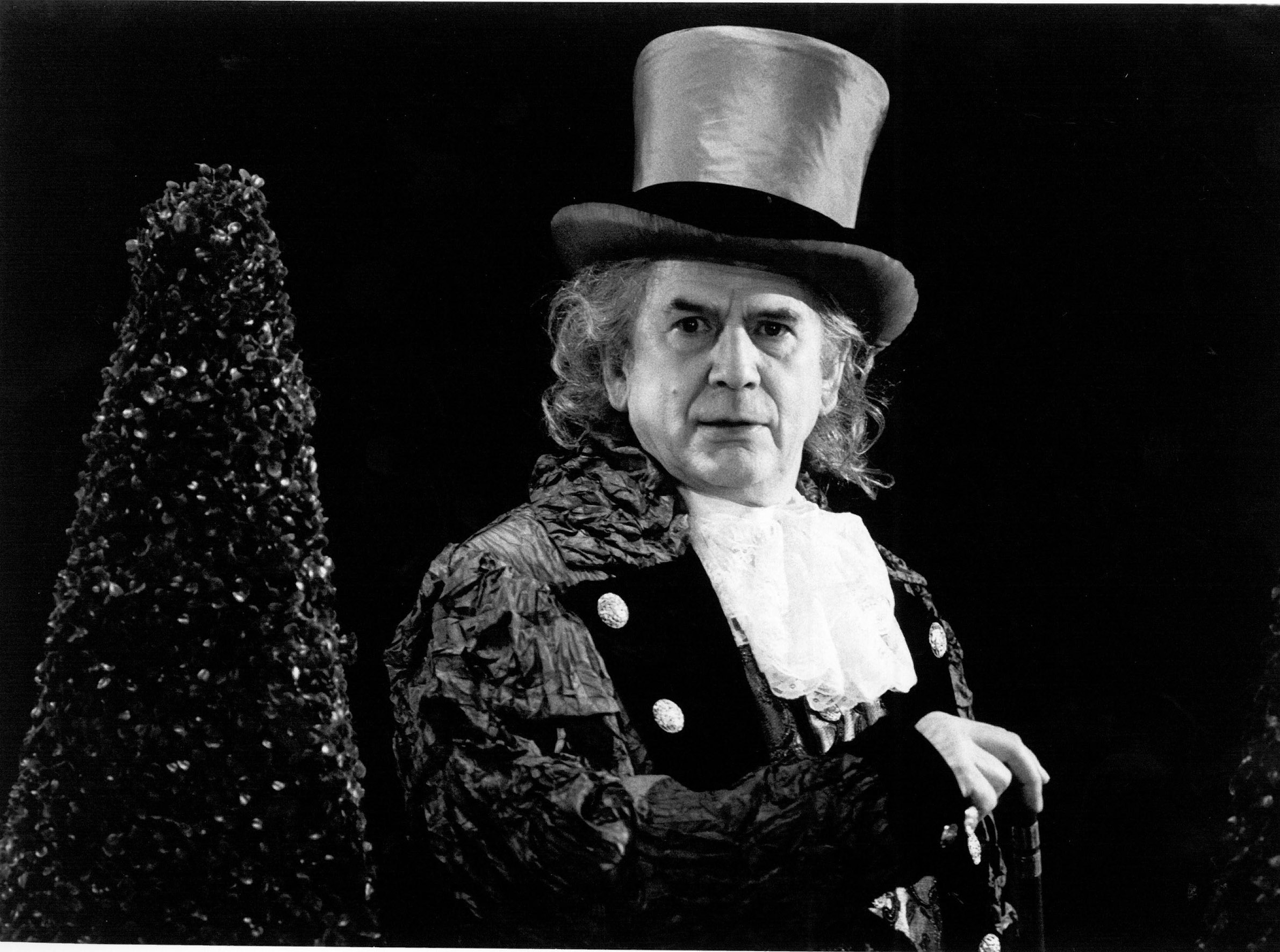
As Don Alfonso in Mozart's Così fan tutte, Düsseldorf 1999

He also performed at the Vienna State Opera, the Bavarian State Opera, Deutsche Oper Berlin, Berlin State Opera, Hamburg State Opera, the Bolshoi Theatre in Moscow, in Buenos Aires, Parma, Verona and Florence.

He was professor of voice at the Robert Schumann Hochschule Düsseldorf and the Aachen division of the Hochschule für Musik und Tanz Köln. He was an honorary member of Deutsche Oper am Rhein and was awarded the title Kammersänger.

Runge died in Verviers, Belgium, on 25 June 2010, at the age of 77.

== Literature ==
- K. J. Kutsch, Leo Riemens: Großes Sängerlexikon. Unveränderte Auflage. K. G. Saur, Bern, 1993, Zweiter Band M–Z, Sp. 2543, ISBN 3-907820-70-3
