= Rudolf Levy =

German painter

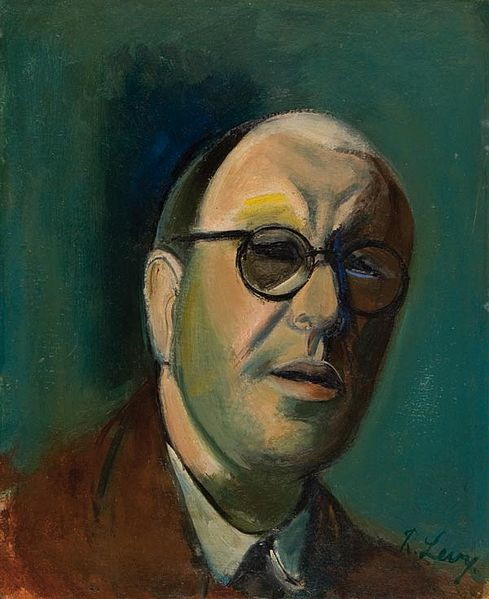
Self-portrait (1943)

Rudolf Levy (15 July 1875, in Stettin – January 1944, in Italy or Auschwitz) was a German expressionist painter of Jewish ancestry.

== Life ==
He came from a Jewish Orthodox family. While he was still a boy, they moved to Danzig, where he grew up. After completing his primary education, he was apprenticed to a carpenter. His parents were strongly opposed to his desires to become an artist but, in 1895, he enrolled at the Academy of Fine Arts, Karlsruhe.

In 1897, he and his friend, Hans Purrmann, went to Munich to open a studio. While there, he continued his studies at the Academy of Fine Arts, Munich with Nikolaus Gysis then, in 1899, took lessons at the private art school operated by Heinrich Knirr and studied plein aire painting with Heinrich von Zügel. He also became a member of a cultural association known as "Sturmfackel" (a type of poppy), that met at the Café Stefanie. In the fall of 1903, he went to Paris and established a circle of German-speaking artists who met at Le Dôme Café. Two years later, he participated in the third exhibition of the Salon d'Automne at the Grand Palais. In 1907, he worked at the newly founded teaching studios of Henri Matisse. Between 1910 and 1913, he made regular trips to the south of France and Tunisia.

During the First World War, he volunteered and fought as a German soldier in Artois and Flanders. He was awarded the Iron Cross in 1915. After the war, he returned to Germany and married Eugenie Schindler (1894-1953), a photographer and actress who went by the name Genia Morelli. They eventually settled in Berlin and, in 1922, he had his first solo exhibition, arranged by Alfred Flechtheim. From 1924 to 1926, he was back in Paris, serving as Flechtheim's agent. In 1928, he became a member of the Berlin Secession and served on its board of directors.

Five years later, due to the increasing persecution of Jews in Germany, he went to Rapallo, Italy, where he stayed with his friend and student, Bob Gesinus-Visser (1898-1978). In 1935, he went to Mallorca. After the outbreak of the Spanish Civil War, he went to New York to stay with his friend, the actor Erik Charell. He did not want to stay there, however, and went back to Europe; first to Dubrovnik, then Ischia, where he lived at the artists' colony. He supported himself with occasional painting sales and financial aid from his family, including his now ex-wife, Genia.

In 1937, his works were placed on the Nazi list of Degenerate Art. After World War II began, his residence permit was cancelled and he had to leave Ischia. Charell worked hard to obtain a visa for him to return to the United States or seek refuge in South America, but to no avail. In 1940, he was able to find a place to stay with friends in Florence. After the German Army occupied Italy in 1943, he had to go underground.

In December of that year, he was lured into a trap by SS agents pretending they were art buyers. He was arrested by the Gestapo, briefly imprisoned at Le Murate, then placed on a transport to Auschwitz. It is generally believed that he died while in transit, but may have survived until reaching there.

== Selected paintings ==
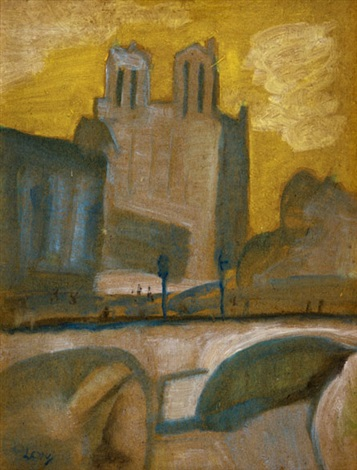
Paris

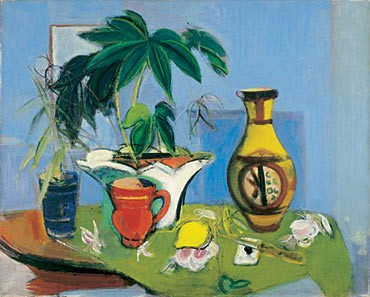
Still-life with Yellow Vase

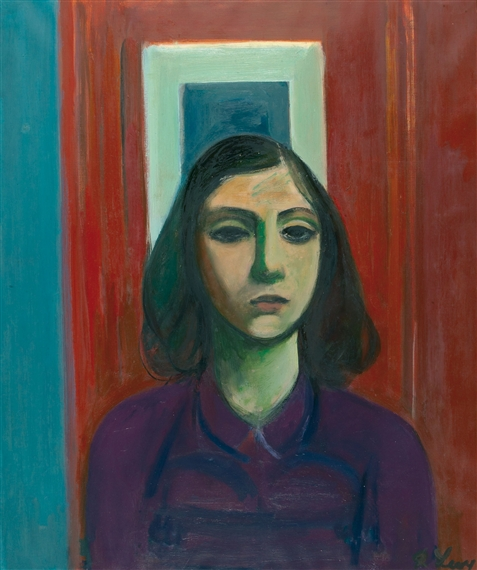
Woman from Ischia

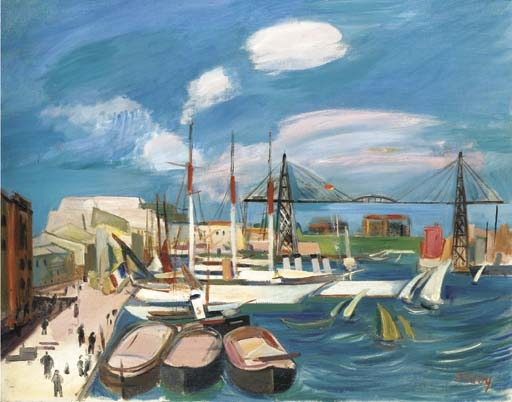
The Port of Marseilles

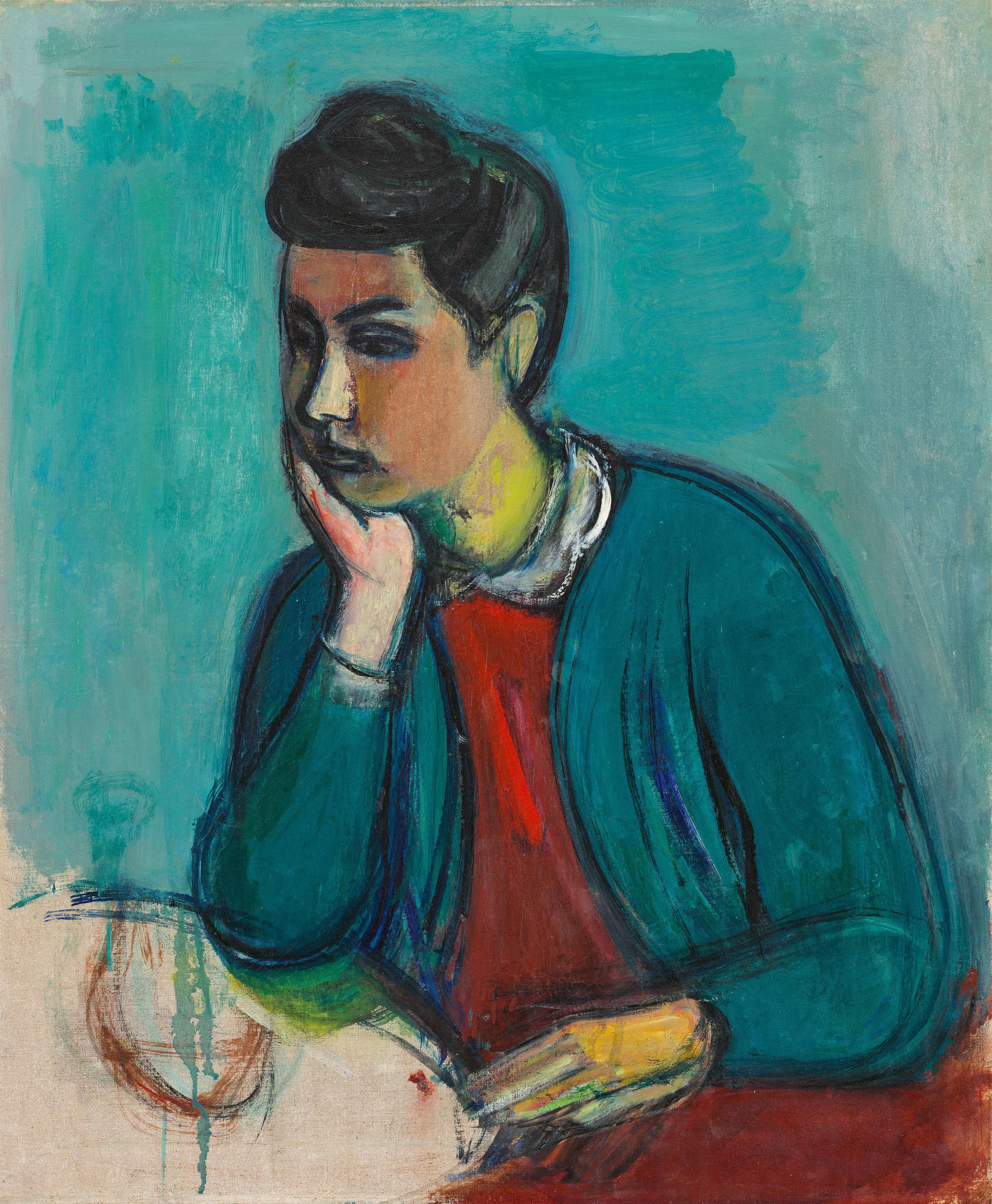
Portrait of Nanda (Florence)
