= Hanns Bolz =

German painter

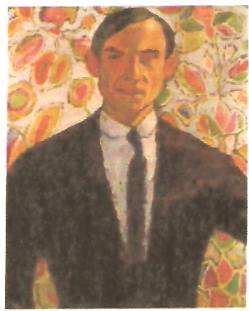
Self-portrait (1910)

Hanns Bolz (22 January 1885, in Aachen – 4 July 1918, in Munich) was a German painter, illustrator and sculptor. He worked in the Expressionist and Cubo-Futurist styles.

== Biography ==
After studying in Aachen and Cologne, he attended the Kunstakademie Düsseldorf from 1905 to 1908. He then spent three years in Paris, where he rented a studio in Montmartre that had previously been occupied by Pablo Picasso. He became an habitué of Le Dôme Café, where he became acquainted with Hans Purrmann, Rudolf Levy and, most importantly, Alfred Flechtheim, who would serve as his agent for the rest of his brief career.

From 1911 to 1912, he lived in Munich, working as an illustrator for the magazine Komet. While there, he met Franz Marc and became associated with the painters of the Der Blaue Reiter. Apparently restless there, he returned to Paris and rented another studio; this time in Montparnasse. He also travelled extensively, visiting Madrid, London, Venice and Oslo.

In 1914, he was drafted for military service and sent to the front. While there, he was involved in a poison gas attack that left him nearly blind and he was mustered out of service in 1917. From that time on, he concentrated on sculpting, as the tactile element compensated for his lost vision to some extent.

At this time, he was living with Otto Freundlich, at his studio in Cologne. Later, he returned to Munich, but became ill and had to be admitted to a hospital where he died of complications from his war injuries.

== Selected paintings ==
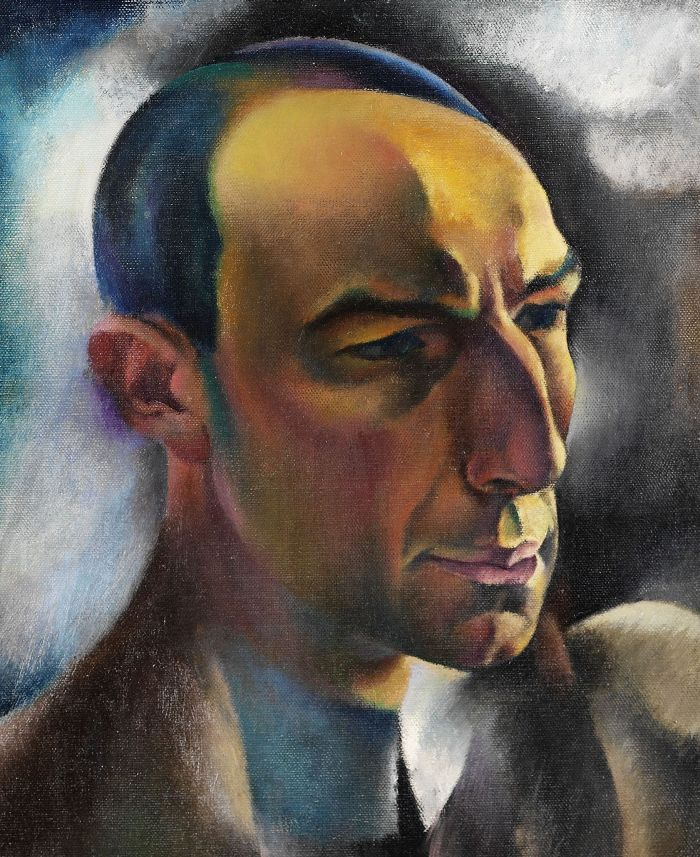
Alfred Flechtheim

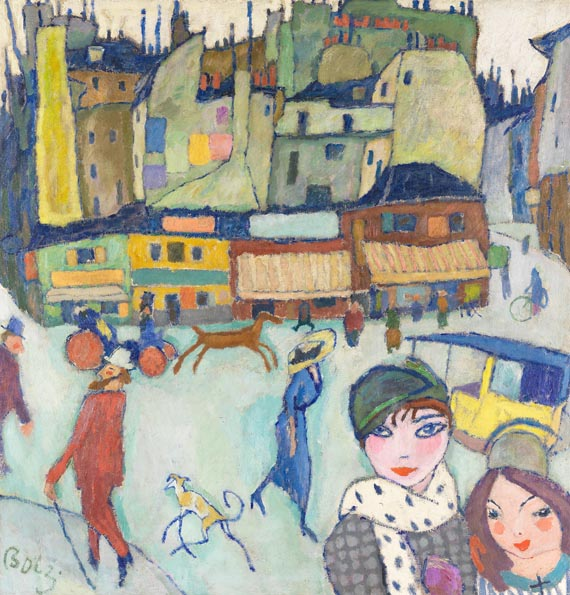
Montmartre

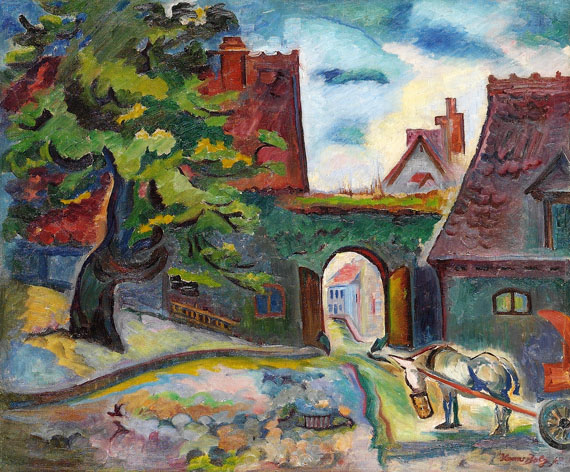
Donkey with Cart

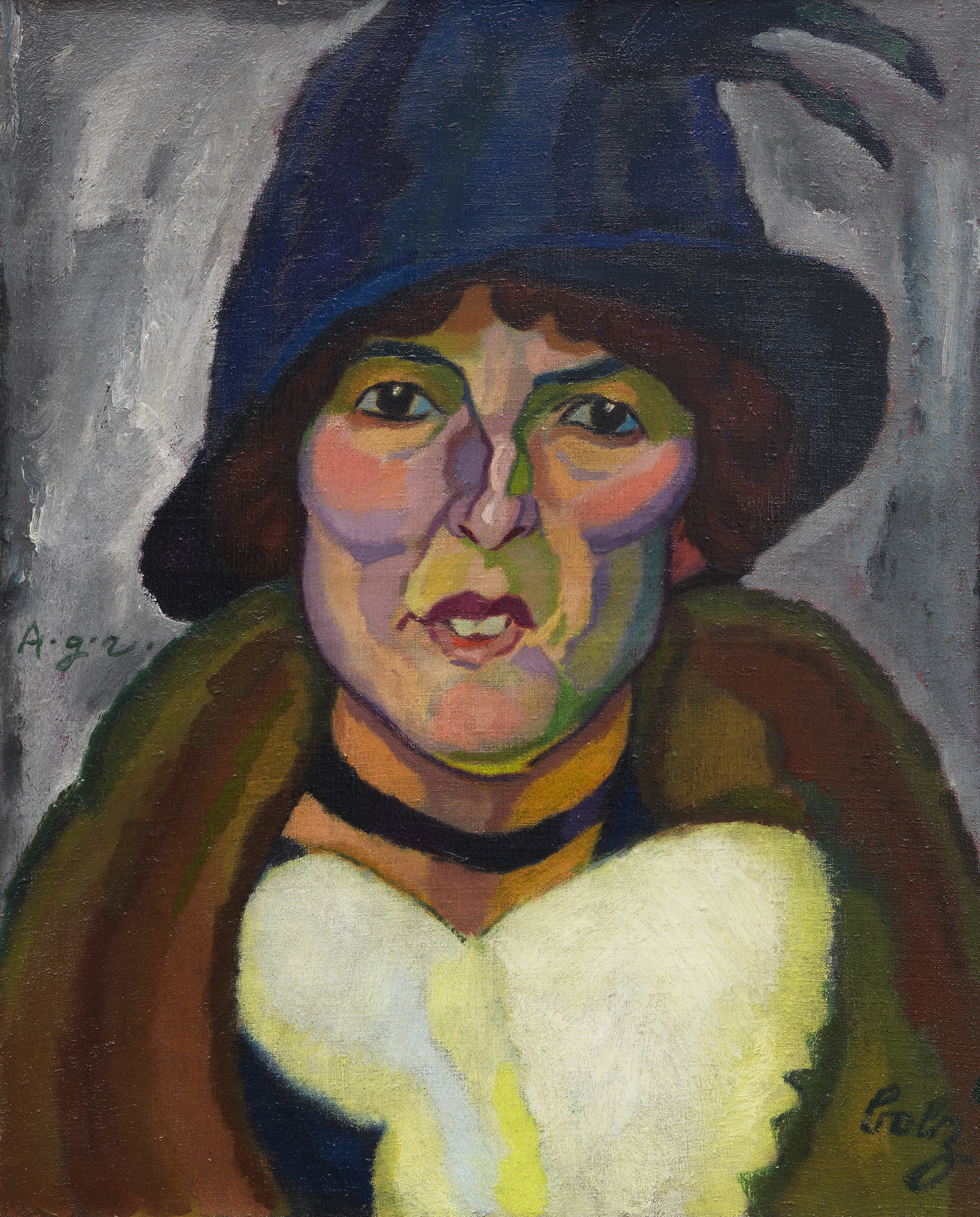
Woman with hat, 1912–1913
