= Café Stefanie =

Café in Munich, Germany

Coordinates: 48°08′52″N 11°34′36″E

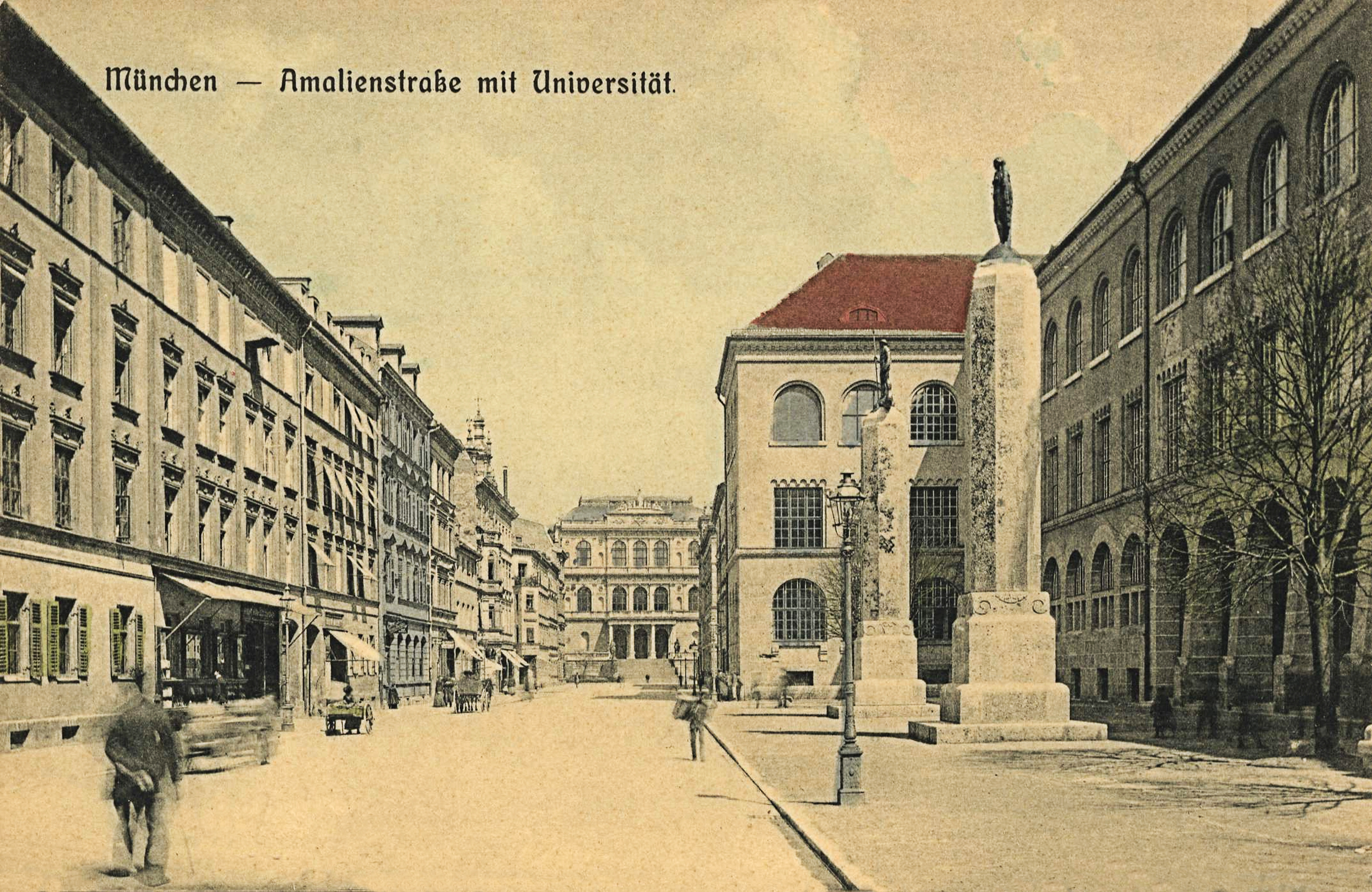
The Amalienstraße around 1900

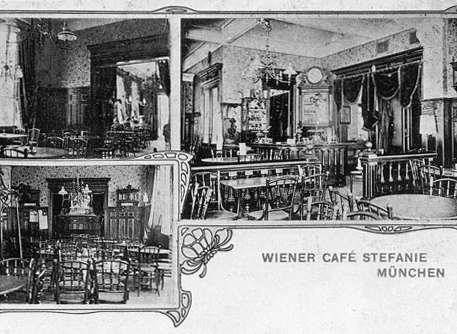
Café Stefanie (interior) - postcard

The Café Stefanie was a coffeehouse in Munich which around the 1900s till the 1920s was the leading artists' meeting place in the city, similar to the Café Größenwahn atmosphere of the Café des Westens in Berlin and the Café Griensteidl in Vienna. The cafe was located on the corner of Amalienstraße and Theresienstraße in the Maxvorstadt not far from the Simplicissimus cabaret and Die Elf Scharfrichter. At the time it was one of the few establishments in Munich which stayed open till 3:00 in the morning.

Regular patrons and visitors included Johannes R. Becher, Hanns Bolz, Hans Carossa, Theodor Däubler, Kurt Eisner, Hanns Heinz Ewers, Leonhard Frank, Otto Gross, Emmy Hennings, Arthur Holitscher, Eduard von Keyserling, Paul Klee, Alfred Kubin, Gustav Landauer, Heinrich Mann, Gustav Meyrink, Erich Mühsam, Erwin Piscator, Lotte Pritzel, Alexander Roda Roda, Ernst Toller, B. Traven and Frank Wedekind.
