= Lotte Pritzel =

German costume designer

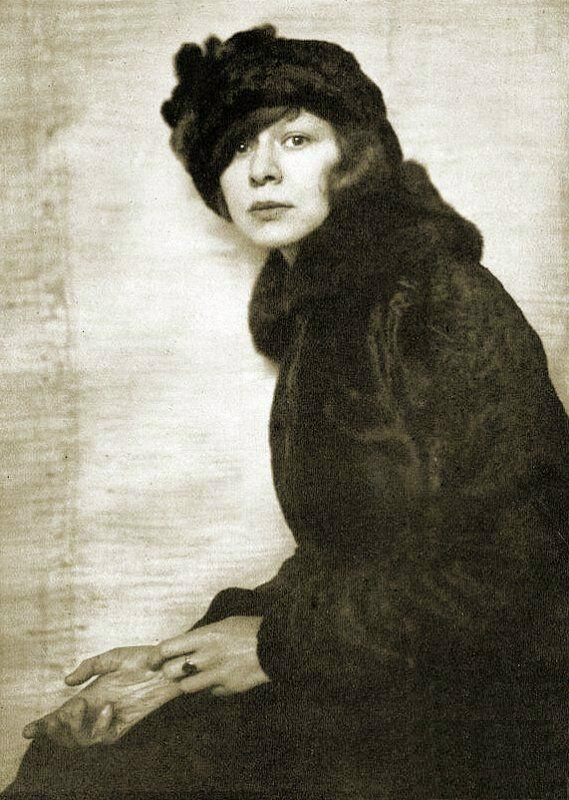
- Pritzel in 1916
- Born: Charlotte Pritzel; January 30, 1887; Breslau, Poland
- Died: February 17, 1952 (aged 65); Berlin, Germany
- Known for: Costume designer

Charlotte Pritzel (30 January 1887 Breslau - 17 February 1952 Berlin) was a German costume designer, doll artist, and draftswoman.

== Life ==
In 1905, Lotte Pritzel moved to Munich. She belonged to the Munich Bohème and moved in the artist circles, which met at Café Stefanie.

Around 1908, Pritzel began making her "wax dolls for the showcase". The approximately 60 centimeter tall figures represented delicate dancers, mysterious Pierrots or melancholic lovers. From 1912, the biscuit manufacturer Hermann Bahlsen commissioned advertising figures that were exhibited at the 1914 Werkbund exhibition in Breslau. She was published in the Darmstadt magazine "German Art and Decoration" as well as exhibitions in Berlin 's Hohenzollern-Kunstgewerbehaus. Her dolls, which were initially flexible and were made of wax at the latest from 1917 and decorated with gauze, lace, glass beads and brocade fragments, sold for high prices.

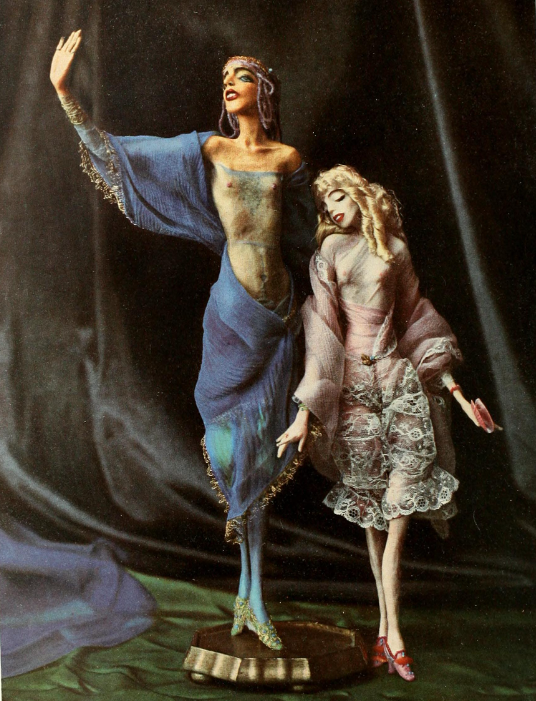
German art and decoration, 1914

Pritzel's entire oeuvre was well over 200 pieces, and around a fifth of the fragile figures have survived to this day. Some were part of the exhibitions “The Puppet Artist and Costume Designer Lotte Pritzel” in Berlin in 2002/2003, and “Off to Munich. Female Artists around 1900” at the Munich City Museum in 2014/2015.

Her 1919 lithograph cycle “Dance – Movements and Costumes” inspired dancers such as Anita Berber or Niddy Impekoven . Rainer Maria Rilke's wrote text for "About the Dolls of Lotte Pritzel", published in 1921 with illustrations by the artist.

In 1923, UFA made a 21-minute documentary entitled Die Pritzel-Puppe.

Pritzel was neither enterprising nor ambitious. Nor did she show any ambition to explain the nature of her dolls in more detail. The "artist who likes to work while intoxicated with morphine" explained at most that her graceful and desperate-looking figures were "creatures of her own" or "inner visions that have become material".

Around 1918, Pritzel was in a relationship with the doctor Gerhard Pagel. Lotte Pritzel and Gerhard Pagel's daughter Irmelin Rose was born on March 15, 1921. The couple married six months later and moved from Munich to Berlin in the early 1920s.

Pritzel also worked as a costume designer and set designer, for example in 1923 for Frank Wedekind's play The Empress of Newfoundland at the Munich Kammerspiele and, in 1925 for Klabund's Kreidekreis at the Deutsches Theater. In the 1930s, Lotte Pritzel, who presumably had one parent of Jewish faith, withdrew from the public eye.

She last lived at Reinickendorfer Straße 31 in Wedding, where Gerhard Pagel also had his medical practice. Pritzel died at Lazarus Hospital in 1952 after suffering a stroke.

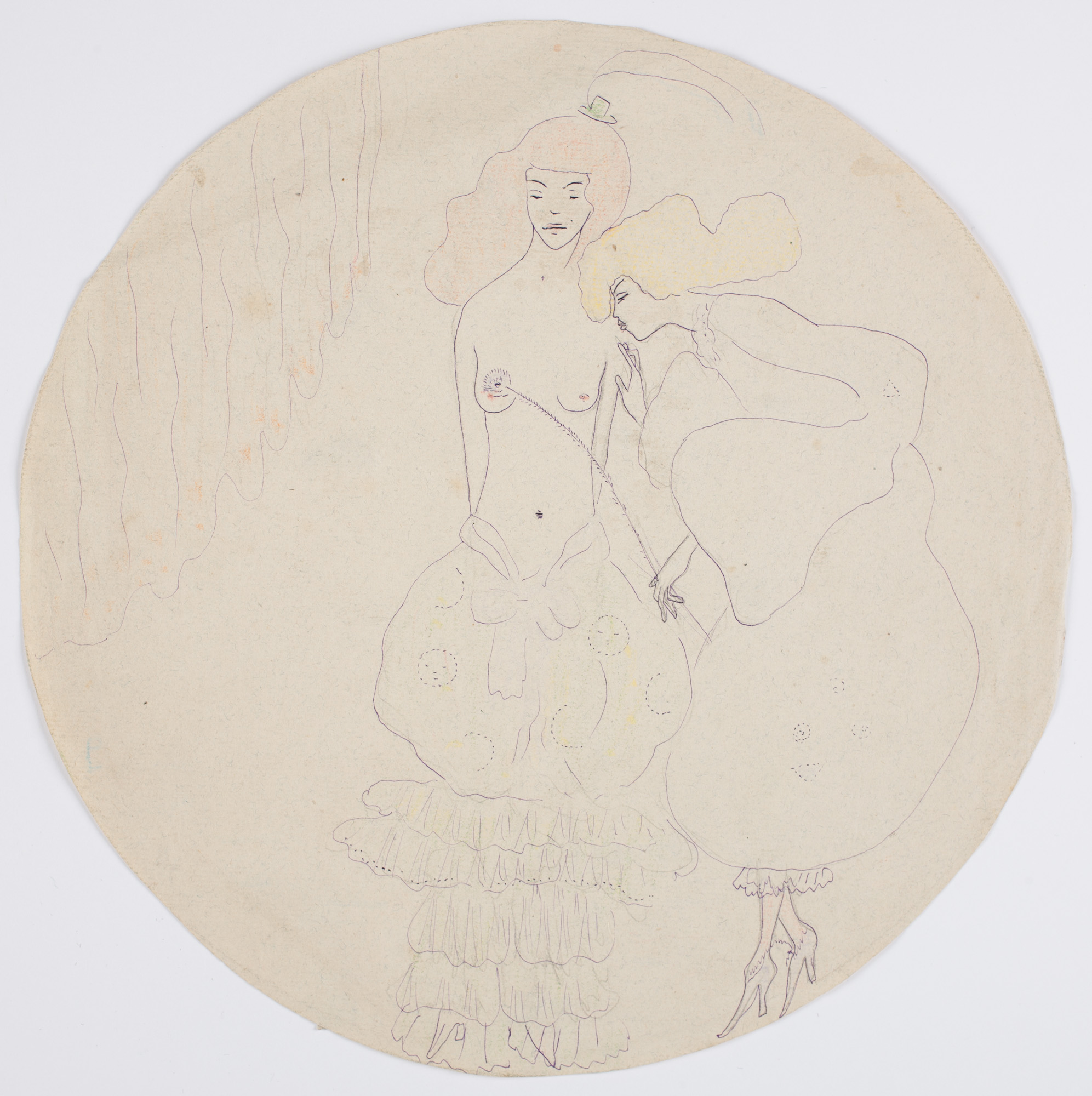
Drawings of dolls (ca. 1910)

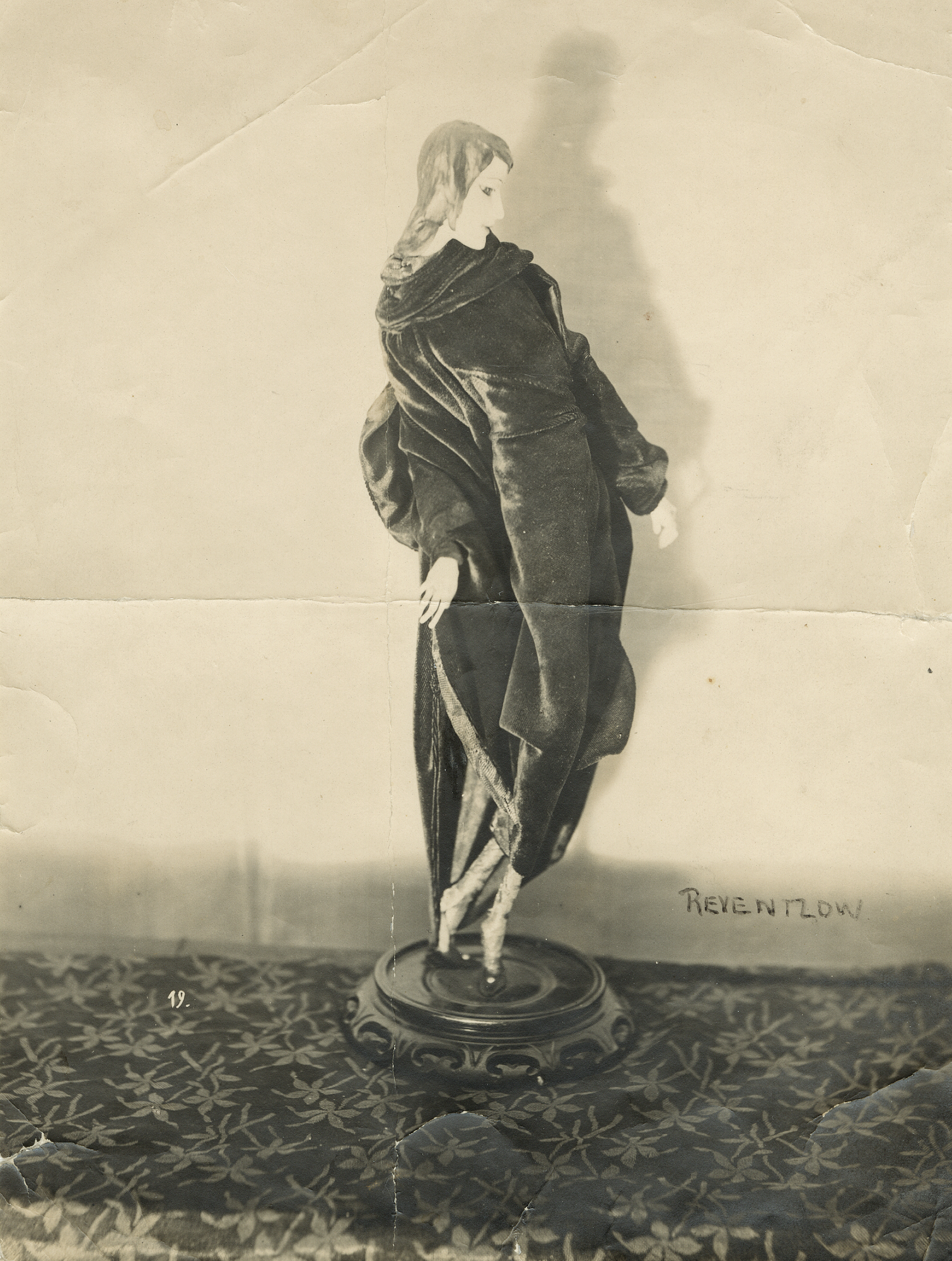
Wax doll Reventlow (ca. 1910)

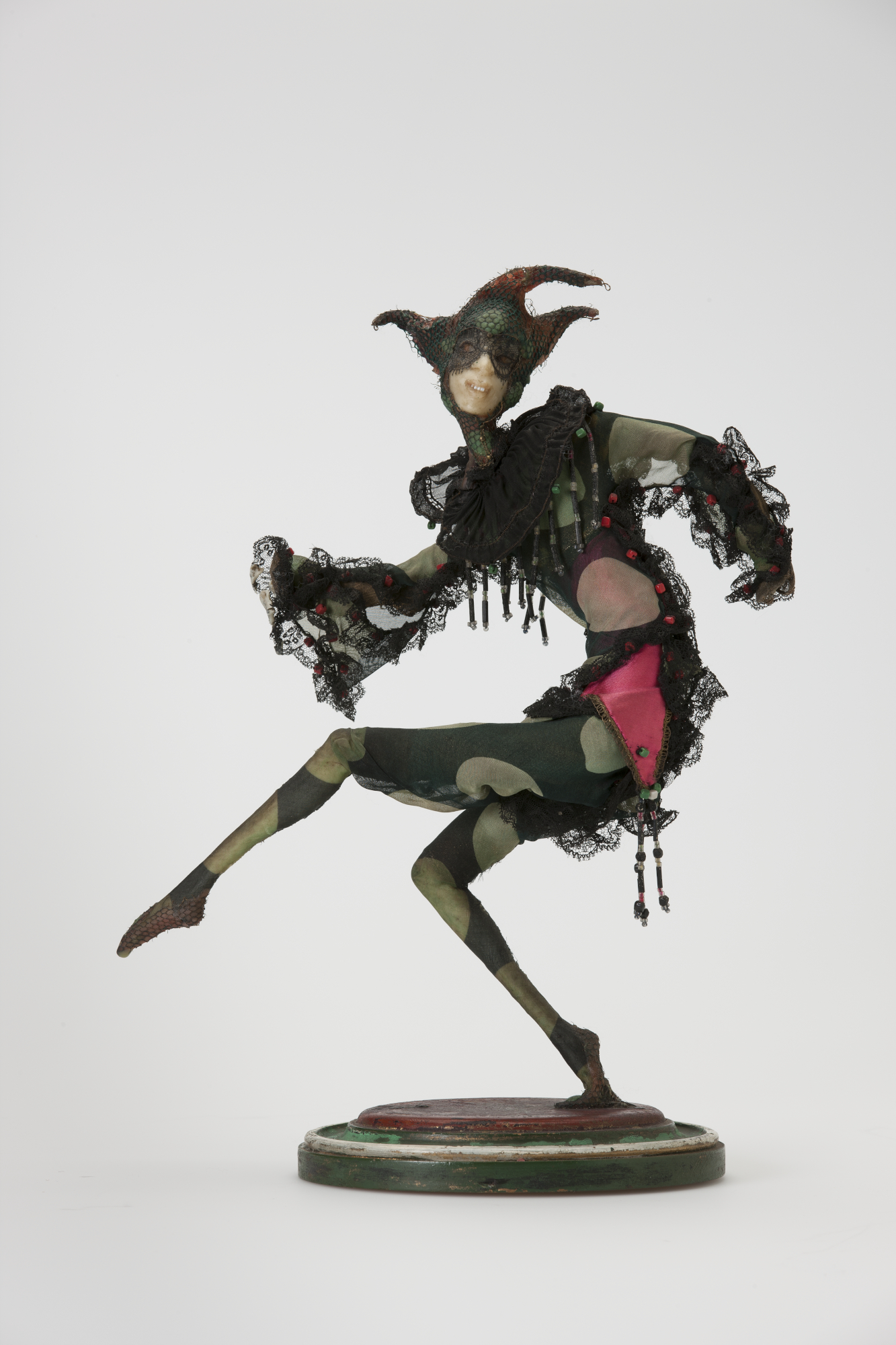
Pierrot made of wax, wire and textiles (1912)

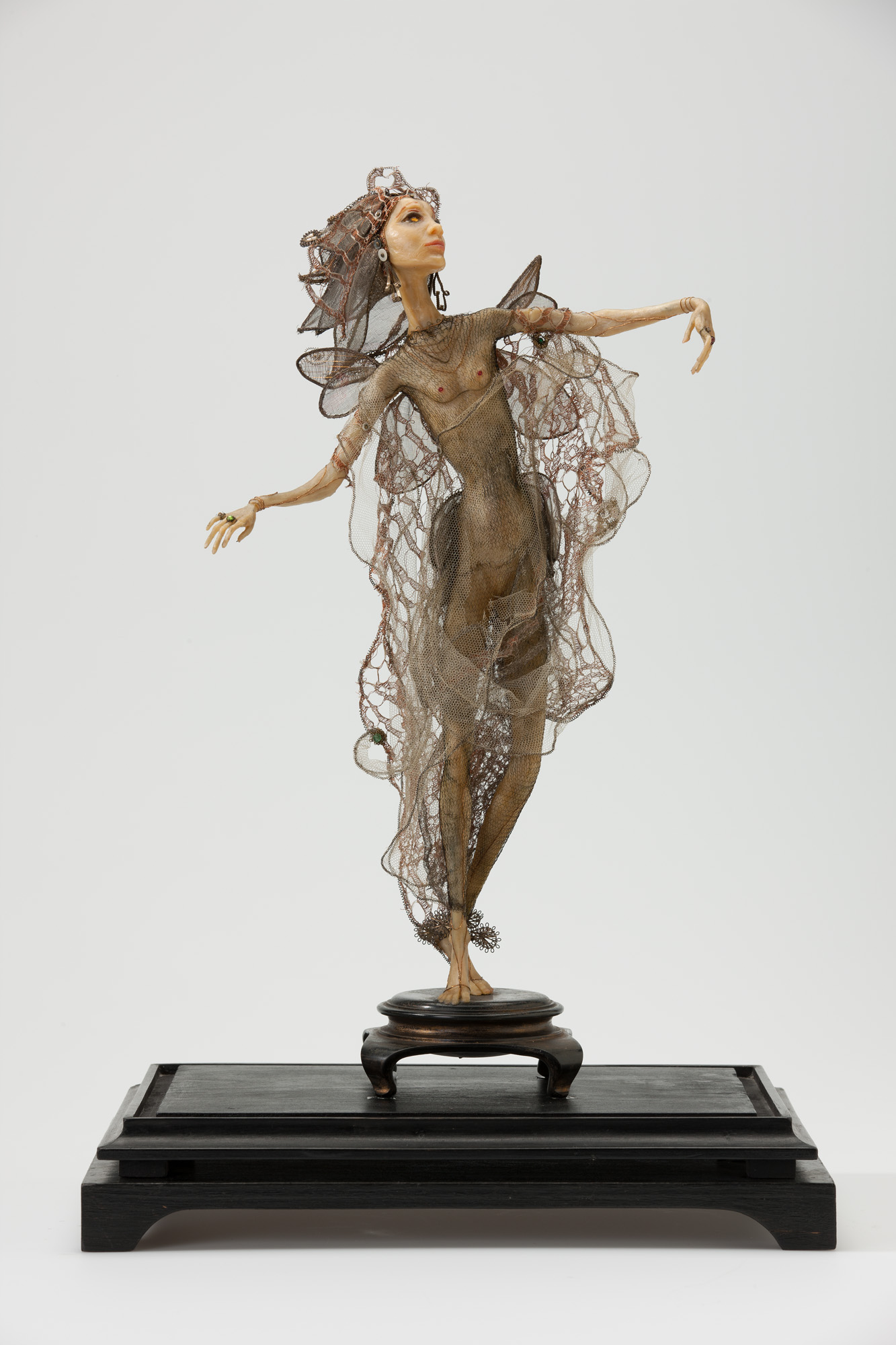
"Bajadere" (before 1924)

== Sources ==
- Nina Lübbren, ‘Renée Sintenis, Wendt & Kühn, Lotte Pritzel: Modes, Markets and Materials in Domestic Objects, 1910-1930’, in Deborah Ascher Barnstone and Maria Makela (eds), Material Modernity: Innovations in Art, Design, and Architecture in the Weimar Republic, London etc.: Bloomsbury, 2022, pp. 221-246.
