= Lashkar =

Lashkar may refer to:

- Lascar, a type of sailor or militiaman employed by the British in South Asia (modern Bangladesh, India, and Pakistan)
- Lashkar (film), a 1989 Bollywood film
- Laskhar (novel), a 2008 military action thriller by Mukul Deva, published by HarperCollins. This is the first of a 4-book bestseller series. The motion picture rights of this novel were purchased by Planman Motion Pictures.
- Lashkargah, a city in southern Afghanistan, capital of Helmand Province
- Lashkar, Gwalior, an area of the city of Gwalior, formerly a separate town
- Lashkar Union, a union council in Bangladesh
- Lashkar-e-Jhangvi, a militant organization in Pakistan
- Lashkar-e-Omar, a Pakistani Islamic fundamentalist organization
- Lashkar-e-Qahhar, an Islamist group that claimed responsibility for the 11 July 2006 Mumbai Train Bombings
- Lashkar-e-Taiba, a Pakistani Islamist terrorist organization

== See also ==
- Lascar (disambiguation)
- Lashkari (disambiguation)
- Laskar (disambiguation)
- Askar (disambiguation), an Arabic word derived from the Persian one
- Askari
