= Lascar (disambiguation) =

Lascar may refer to:

- Lascar, a sailor or militiaman from South Asia employed by the European nations from the 16th century until the beginning of the 20th century
- Lascar (volcano), the most active volcano of the northern Chilean Andes
- Lascăr, a Romanian surname and given name
- Pantoporia, a genus of butterfly
- Upper and Lower Lascar Row, a street in Hong Kong

== See also ==
- Laskar (disambiguation)
- Lashkar (disambiguation)
