= Bogdan Lascăr =

Romanian sculptor, graphic designer and film maker

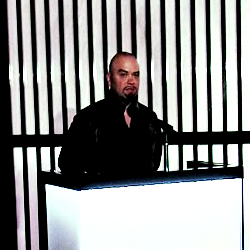
- Lascăr speaking at Armani Hotel, Burj Khalifa, Dubai, April 2011.
- Born: July 30, 1974 (age 51); Bacău, Romania
- Education: Bucharest National University of Arts
- Known for: Sculpture, graphic design, film
- Notable work: Neurophysiologic shapings
- Awards: UNESCO Gold Medal
- Website: bogdanlascar.com

Bogdan Lascăr (born July 30, 1974) is a Romanian sculptor, graphic designer, and film maker. He is the founder of the concept of "Neurophysiologic shapings".

== Life and career ==
Lascăr was born in 1974 in Bacău. He graduated from the Academy of Fine Arts in Bucharest in 1998. His main focus during his studies was sculpture. He was Teaching Assistant in the Department of Sculpture at the same academy between 2004 and 2006. Starting with 2000, he works as visual counselor in the field of cosmetic surgery. Bogdan Lascar lives and works in Bucharest and Dubai (UAE). In 2005 in Athens, Greece, he was awarded the UNESCO Gold Medal.

== Work ==
The concept of "Neurophysiologic shapings", which is fundamental to his work, is a wordplay, in which the meaning of the Romanian word ne-ura (English: no-anger) is blended with the meaning of the medical concept of neurophysiology. What we are dealing with here is a physiology of “no-anger” projected in the field of meta-artistic expression.

Lascăr proposes a new type of meta-visual human expression, placed beyond art, above visual, an existential adventure of individual and social shapings based on the report between spiritual, corporal and obiectual in the field of the most symbolic personal meta-estheticism.

His work is a fusion between the following elements:

- Film installation with its sculptural extensions.
- “Cromatic-alusivoid” drawings, which are drawings applied to flat or volumetric surfaces, whose textures are ranging from resin to canvas, accompanied by successive semi-transparent layers of oil colors.
- “Framing” concept, which is a collage of monumental frames for panels and sculptures.
- “Calmeneuri“, which is a personal system of modeling by means of self-defense skills with its formula: The force of deconstructive gesture, by projection in the field of plastic expression becomes the power of constructive aesthetic gesture.
- Elements of avant-garde medicine.

== Shows ==
- Solo show at the Palace of the Parliament (Romanian: Palatul Parlamentului), the world's second largest building after the Pentagon (1999)
- House of Deputies, Conference Hall "Constantin Brâncuși", Bucharest, Romania (1999)
- Solo show at "Hanul cu tei" Gallery, Bucharest, Romania (2000)
- Group show "Atelier 35", Museum of Art, Constanta, Romania (2000)
- Performance Body Painting for "Vanguardia" fashion show at Hotel Sofitel, Bucharest, Romania (2001)
- Performance Body Painting for "Fashion Days" at Romanian Parliament, Bucharest, Romania (2002)
- Group show at Italian Cultural Centre, Bucharest, Romania (2002)
- Solo show at ROMEXPO ("AM PRESS" stand), Bucharest, Romania (2003)
- Body Painting for "Roberto Cavalli", in The Office Club, Bucharest, Romania (2004)
- Solo show at the Romanian Embassy in Athens, Greece (2005)
- Solo show, Athens, Greece, invited by the UNESCO Club of the Department of Piraeus and Islands (2005)
- Performance and solo show at "Fundatia" Gallery, Bucharest, Romania (2006)
- Solo show at "Melenia" Gallery, Bucharest, Romania (2010)
- Solo show in Dubai at Armani Hotel, Burj Khalifa, the tallest structure in the world, which plays its role in the show (2011)
- Solo show at D.I.F.C. Center, Dubai (2011)
