= Lashkari, Dahanu =

Village in Maharashtra

Rai
- village
- Rai
- Location in Maharashtra, India Rai (India)
- Coordinates: 20.0082607°N 72.743704°E
- Country: India
- State: Maharashtra
- District: Palghar
- Taluka: Dahanu
- Elevation: 18 m (59 ft)

Population (2011)
  - Total: 967
- Time zone: UTC+5:30 (IST)
- 2011 census code: 551599

Rai is a village in the Palghar district of Maharashtra, India. It is located in the Dahanu taluka.

== Demographics ==
According to the 2011 census of India, Rai has 211 households. The effective literacy rate (i.e. the literacy rate of population excluding children aged 6 and below) is 55.54%.

Demographics (2011 Census)
| | Total | Male | Female |
|---|---|---|---|
| Population | 967 | 473 | 494 |
| Children aged below 6 years | 137 | 70 | 67 |
| Scheduled caste | 0 | 0 | 0 |
| Scheduled tribe | 863 | 423 | 440 |
| Literates | 461 | 255 | 206 |
| Workers (all) | 553 | 290 | 263 |
| Main workers (total) | 538 | 288 | 250 |
| Main workers: Cultivators | 12 | 6 | 6 |
| Main workers: Agricultural labourers | 181 | 94 | 87 |
| Main workers: Household industry workers | 10 | 6 | 4 |
| Main workers: Other | 335 | 182 | 153 |
| Marginal workers (total) | 15 | 2 | 13 |
| Marginal workers: Cultivators | 1 | 0 | 1 |
| Marginal workers: Agricultural labourers | 4 | 0 | 4 |
| Marginal workers: Household industry workers | 1 | 0 | 1 |
| Marginal workers: Others | 9 | 2 | 7 |
| Non-workers | 414 | 183 | 231 |
