= Hans Purrmann =

German painter (1880–1966)

Hans Marsilius Purrmann
- Self-portrait, 1897
- Born: 10 April 1880; Speyer
- Died: 17 April 1966 (aged 86); Basel
- Known for: Painting

Hans Marsilius Purrmann (10 April 1880 – 17 April 1966) was a German artist. He was born in Speyer where he also grew up. He completed an apprenticeship as a scene painter and interior decorator, and subsequently studied in Karlsruhe and Munich before going to Paris in 1906. It was here he became a student and later a friend of Henri Matisse whom he set up a painting school with. After 1916, Purrmann lived in Berlin and Langenargen (Lake Constance), moving from there in 1935 to run the German art foundation at the Villa Romana in Florence. He lived there until 1943, then in Montagnola (Switzerland). He died in Basel. Typical of Purrmann's style are colourful, sensitively painted landscapes, still lifes and portraits. There are large collections of his works in Langenargen Museum and in the Purrmann House, Speyer.

== Gallery ==
Seated nude, 1909

Nude in front of a mirror, 1919

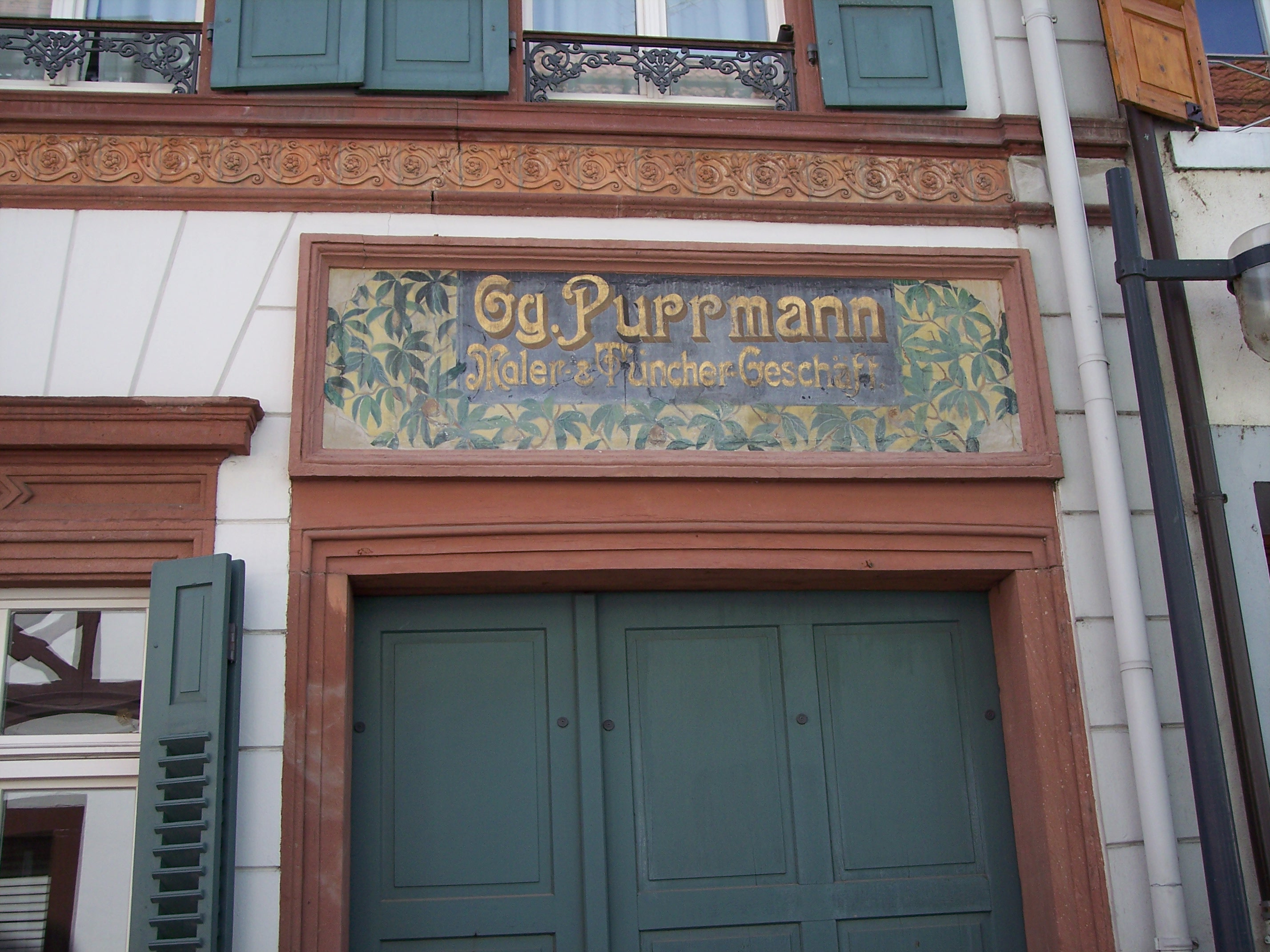
Entrance of Purrmann house in Speyer
