= Laske =

Laske is a surname. Notable people with the surname include:

- Ernst Laske (1915–2004), German-Israeli book antiquarian and bibliophile
- Gabi Laske
- Gotthard Laske (1882–1936), German confectioner, bibliophile and patron of the arts
- Oskar Laske (de)
- Otto Laske
- Laske (Ralbitz-Rosenthal) (Upper Sorbian: Łask), Ralbitz-Rosenthal
- Laske Hundred (sv), Sweden. See List of hundreds of Sweden

== See also ==
- Łask, Lask (disambiguation)
- Łaska, Laska
- Łaski, Laski (disambiguation), Lasky
- Lasker (disambiguation)
