= Bleibtreu =

Bleibtreu (German: stay loyal) is a German surname. Notable people with the surname include:

- Georg Bleibtreu (1828–1892), German painter
- Gisela Bleibtreu-Ehrenberg (1929–2025), German sociologist, ethnologist, sexologist, and writer
- Hedwig Bleibtreu (1868–1958), Austrian actress
- Karl Bleibtreu (1859–1928), German writer
- Marcel Bleibtreu (1918–2001), French activist and theorist
- Monica Bleibtreu (1944–2009), Austrian actress
- Moritz Bleibtreu (born 1971), German actor, son of Monica
