= Mirosław Augustyniak =

Polish politician

Mirosław Jan Augustyniak

Starosta of Maków County
- Incumbent
- Assumed office 12 February 2024
- Preceded by: Zbigniew Deptuła

Councillor of Maków County
- Incumbent
- Assumed office 2024

Member of the Masovian Voivodeship Sejmik
- In office 2010–2024

Personal details
- Born: 29 August 1963 (age 63) Maków Mazowiecki, Poland
- Education: Agricultural and Technical Academy in Olsztyn

Mirosław Augustyniak (born 29 August 1963) is a Polish politician who has served as Starosta of Maków County since 2024. Augustyniak started his political career with the Polish People's Party, serving as a member of the Masovian Voivodeship Sejmik in 2010–2024 before becoming Starosta. In 2023, he unsuccessfully ran for a seat in the Senate in spite of his party's membership of an electoral bloc in his constituency.

== Biography ==
Mirosław Augustyniak was born on 29 August 1963 in Maków Mazowiecki. He graduated from the Agricultural and Technical Academy in Olsztyn (now part of the University of Warmia and Mazury in Olsztyn), completed postgraduate studies in the Radom Polytechnic and pedagogical studies at the University of Social Sciences and Economics in Gdańsk.

Augustyniak served as the director of the Voivodeship Traffic Training Center in Ostrołęka from 1999 until 2010, when he resigned to become a councilman in the Masovian Voivodeship Sejmik. He was succeeded to the directorial office by Rafał Gorno.

=== Party work ===
Augustyniak was long engaged politically as part of the Polish People's Party (PSL). In the 2010s, he served as the chairman of the party's Maków Mazowiecki powiat-level branch. On 25 August 2012, he was re-elected to the office with 64 of 72 votes, becoming also its delegate to the Voivodeship Congress.

After the Polish People's Party leader, Janusz Piechociński, resigned following a decreased vote share for the party in the 2015 parliamentary election, a snap leadership election was held at the party's Supreme Council. Augustyniak contested the election against Władysław Kosiniak-Kamysz, as the party's by-law required that at least two candidates contest the election. He received 3 of the 7 opposing votes to Kosiniak-Kamysz, who received 92 votes in support of him. Kosiniak-Kamysz was later re-elected in a regular party leadership election in 2016.

In late 2019 and 2020, Augustyniak distanced himself from PSL, affiliating with the Bezpartyjni Samorządowcy and its member in the Voivodeship Sejmik, Konrad Rytel. After he contested the 2023 Senate election, the PSL announced Augustyniak's expulsion. However, in 2024, Augustyniak contested the local election under the Third Way alliance, which included PSL.

=== Political office ===
On a local level, he served three terms in the Masovian Voivodeship Sejmik, first elected in 2010, and re-elected in 2014 and 2018. In the 2014 local elections, he also concurrently ran for city president of Ostrołęka from an independent electoral committee, (Note: Electoral Committee of Voters "Our Ostrołęka" (Polish: Komitet Wyborczy Wyborców "Nasza Ostrołęka")) earning 2,308 votes (12.19%) and coming fourth. In 2024, he instead ran for a seat in the council of Maków County, of which he was just elected Starosta, and was elected with 703 votes (18.87%).

Augustyniak also contested national-level elections: in 2011, he unsuccessfully contested that year's parliamentary election, located 24th (last) on the PSL party list in Sejm Constituency no. 18. He earned 3,067 votes (0.90%). He unsuccessfully ran in the same constituency in 2015, located 4th on the PSL party list. He received 2,839 votes (0.76%). In 2023, he unsuccessfully ran for Senate, coming third with 30,389 votes (14.70%).

==== 2023 Senate campaign ====
2023 Senate election in Sieldce I (constituency no. 46). Augustyniak (depicted in gray) is visible with strong regional support in his home region, winning in the gminas of Sypniewo, Krasnosielc and Płoniawy-Bramura.

In the 2023 Senate election, Augustyniak was considered as a possible candidate to the Senate Constituency no. 46 by the Senate Pact 2023, an anti-Law and Justice opposition bloc, of which the PSL was a member. However, after the Senate Pact instead selected Grzegorz Nowosielski (Poland 2050), Augustyniak raised enough support signatures to register himself as an independent candidate (Note: Electoral Committee of Voters Mirosław Augustyniak Candidate for Senator of the Republic of Poland (Polish: Komitet Wyborczy Wyborców Mirosława Augustyniaka Kandydata na Senatora Rzeczpospolitej Polskiej)) in the election. Augustyniak's candidacy, alongside Jarosław Lasecki's in Senate Constituency no. 68 and Arkadiusz Bartkowski in Senate Constituency no. 19, were the only three instances of party members belonging to the Senate Pact 2023 running against the Pact's candidates. As a result of his candidacy, PSL Chairman Władysław Kosiniak-Kamysz announced the party would remove Augustyniak from the party, and Dariusz Klimczak announced that Augustyniak had "removed himself" by contravening the party's by-law. In an interview for "Moja Ostrołęka", he defended his decision to run, stating he was the best candidate for Senator in the constituency. Ultimately, Augustyniak came third in the election, attaining 30,389 votes (14.70%).

==== Starosta of Maków Mazowiecki ====
Augustyniak resigned from seat in the Mazovian Voivodeship Sejmik after being elected Starosta of Maków County on 12 February 2024, succeeding Zbigniew Deptuła, who resigned to become the chairman of the Voivodeship Fund for Environmental Protection and Water Management in Warsaw. Augustyniak was elected with 9 votes against 6 for Andrzej Kos (PiS), then confirmed with 14 votes for and 1 against. He appointed Dariusz Wierzbicki (TD) as his deputy, who was confirmed with 9 votes for and 6 invalid votes.

On 7 April, Augustyniak was elected to the Maków County council in the 2024 local election. On the first sitting of the new Powiat council term on 7 May, he was re-elected as Starosta with 9 votes, defeating Rafał Niestępski (PiS).

On 21 August 2025, councillors of the Maków County council voted to accept a citizens' initiative (Note: 15 of 17 councillors were present at the vote, 7 voted for enthronement and 8 decided not to vote, bringing the vote below the required quorum. However, the council later declared the vote as valid.) enthroning Jesus Christ as the "King of Powiat Maków" and declared 21 June as "Day of Jesus Christ King of the Powiat". Augustyniak defended the wording of the law, although he expressed the certainty of the law being struck down by the Voivode. He later condemned the law, stating it humiliated the Powiat in the eyes of Poland. The Voivodeship invalidated the law in September 2025.

== Views ==
In a 2011 parliamentary debate, Augustyniak spoke out against the Janosikowe tax, a tax system where wealthy self-governments have to redistribute a portion of their revenue to poorer ones. He supported lowering ZUS contributions and stated his support for entrepreneurs. He opposed abolition of Agricultural Social Insurance Fund. He also proposed education reform that would focus on reducing unemployment by helping students choose degrees with high employment demand. In 2014, he expressed disappointment at the low rural turnout in the 2014 European Parliament election.

In 2015, Augustyniak stated his support for the death penalty, minimum wage, the 1997–2021 abortion law and abolition of the Senate. He opposed introduction of the Euro, single-member Sejm constituencies, privatization of healthcare, flat tax, euthanasia and same-sex marriage. He proposed lowering the retirement age to 65 for men and 60 for women as well as a seniority pension for men after 40 years of work and women after 35 years of work. He supported abolishing gymnasiums and halving the amount of religion classes in school. He supported legalization of medical marijuana, although opposed recreational marijuana.

== Personal life ==
Mirosław Augustyniak was the son of Ryszard Augustyniak (born 1931–1932), who died on 22 May 2021. He is a resident of Sypniewo, nearby his birthplace of Maków Mazowiecki.

== Election history ==
=== Local and national elections ===
Electoral history of Mirosław Augustyniak
| Year | Office | C. | Party | Votes | | Result | Ref. |
| Year | Office | C. | Party | Total | % | Result | Ref. |
|---|---|---|---|---|---|---|---|
| 2010 | Masovian Voivodeship Sejmik | 6 | Polish People's Party | 10,622 | 3.45% | Won | |
| 2011 | Sejm of the Republic of Poland | 18 | Polish People's Party | 3,067 | 0.90% | Lost | |
| 2014 | Masovian Voivodeship Sejmik | 6 | Polish People's Party | 13,717 | 4.38% | Won | |
| 2014 | City president of Ostrołęka | – | Independent | 2,308 | 12.19% | Lost | |
| 2015 | Sejm of the Republic of Poland | 18 | Polish People's Party | 2,839 | 0.76% | Lost | |
| 2018 | Masovian Voivodeship Sejmik | 6 | Polish People's Party | 15,414 | 4.06% | Won | |
| 2023 | Senate of the Republic of Poland | 46 | Independent | 30,389 | 14.70% | Lost | |
| 2024 | Powiat council of Maków Mazowiecki | 2 | Third Way | 703 | 18.87% | Won | |

=== Elections to party offices ===
Electoral history of Mirosław Augustyniak
| Date | Office | Party | Votes | | Result | Ref. |
| Date | Office | Party | Total | % | Result | Ref. |
|---|---|---|---|---|---|---|
| 25 August 2012 | Chairman of the PSL Powiat Council | Polish People's Party | 64 | 88.89% | Won | |
| 7 November 2015 | Party Chairman | Polish People's Party | 3 | 3.03% | Lost | |
