= 2015 Polish People's Party leadership election =

Polish election 2015

- 7 November 2015
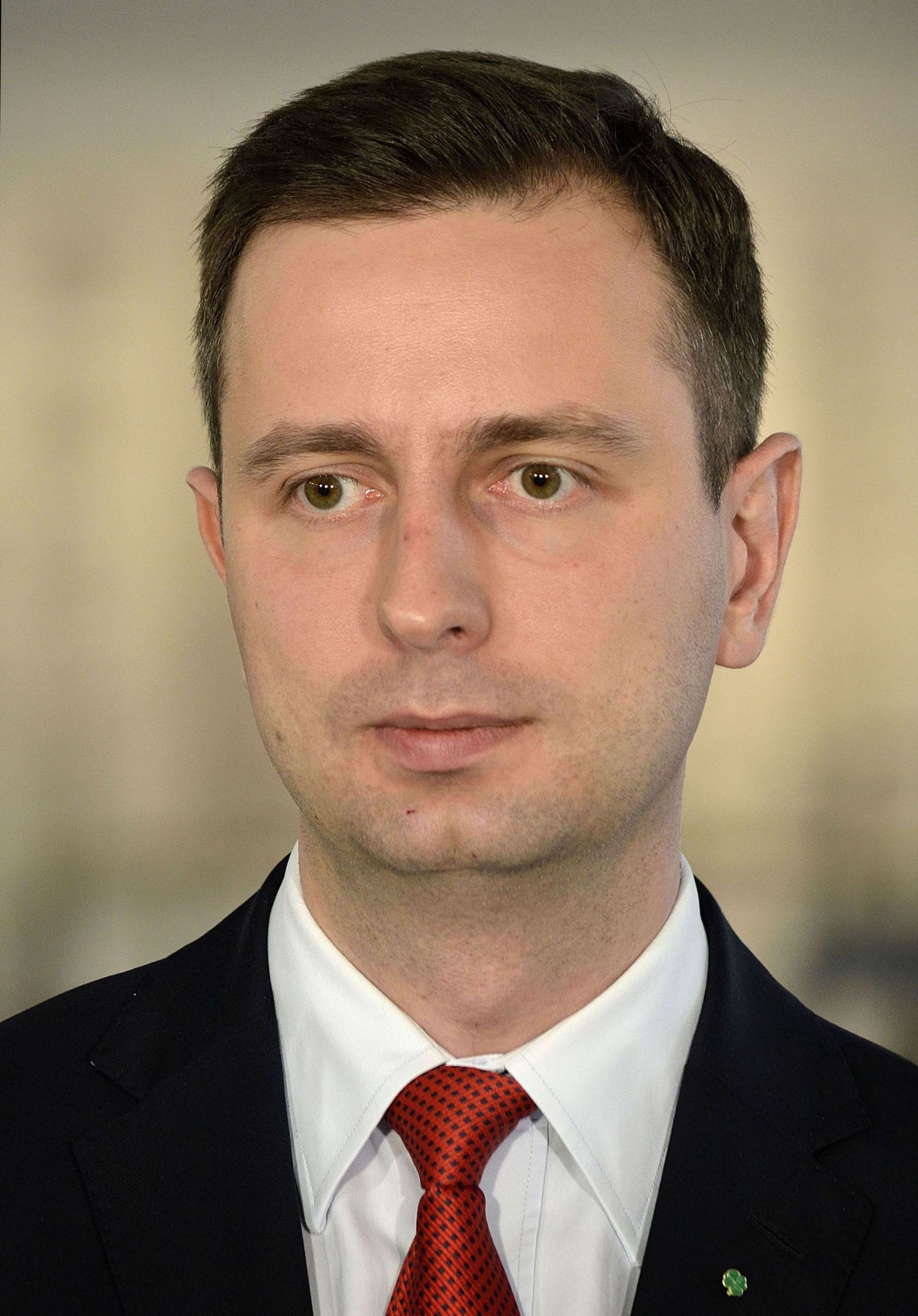

| Candidate | Władysław Kosiniak-Kamysz | Mirosław Augustyniak |
| Popular vote | 92 | 3 |
| Percentage | 92.93% | 3.03% |
Chairman before election
Janusz Piechociński
Elected Chairman
Władysław Kosiniak-Kamysz

The 2015 Polish People's Party leadership election was held on 7 November 2015. Władysław Kosiniak-Kamysz was elected as the leader of the party with no major opposition following the resignation of leader Janusz Piechociński in the aftermath of the party's poor 2015 parliamentary election results. The election marked a generational and ideological shift in the party, with the younger generation led by Kosiniak-Kamysz transitioning the party away from agrarianism.

== Background ==
The Polish People's Party was led by Janusz Piechociński since 2012, when he narrowly ousted Waldemar Pawlak from the position of party chairman at the 11th Polish People's Party Convention. In the 2015 parliamentary election, the party barely crossed the 5% electoral threshold, gaining only 5.1% of the vote, a decline of 3.2 pp since 2011 and overall its worst result in history. Following the election, Piechociński announced he would step down from party leadership, either resigning in the same year or not seeking re-election at the next party congress, ultimately following through with the former, promoting Władysław Kosiniak-Kamysz.

Mazovian Voivodeship Marshal Adam Struzik and former leader Waldemar Pawlak were among the figures considered as potential candidates. Ultimately, neither contested the leadership election, and Struzik submitted the nomination of Kosiniak-Kamysz, although he was uncertain whether to accept the nomination until Piechociński's resignation.

== Candidates ==
| Candidate | Born | Political office |
|---|---|---|
| Mirosław Augustyniak | 29 August 1963; Maków Mazowiecki, Poland | Member of the Masovian Sejmik (2010–2024) |
| Władysław Kosiniak-Kamysz | 10 August 1981; Kraków, Poland | Minister of Labour and Social Policy (2011–2015) |

== Election ==
The election was held on 7 November 2015. Instead of a regular election at a party congress, the Supreme Council of the PSL, the party first voted to accept the resignation of Janusz Piechociński, with 94% voting in favor. The Supreme Council then elected Władysław Kosiniak-Kamysz as the party's chairman, with 92 voting for his candidacy, and 7 against him, 3 of which voting for opponent Mirosław Augustyniak. Augustyniak was a minor local politician who only contested the election due to the party's by-law requiring two candidates in a leadership contest.

== Results ==
=== Piechociński resignation ===
| Candidate | Vote | % |
|---|---|---|
| For resignation ✓ | 95 | 94.06 |
| Against resignation | 3 | 2.97 |
| Total | 98 | 97.03 |
| Abstain | 3 | 2.97 |
| Blank/Invalid | 0 | — |
| Total votes | 101 | 100.00 |
Source: Polsat News

=== Party chairman ===
| Candidate | Vote | % |
|---|---|---|
| Władysław Kosiniak-Kamysz ✓ | 92 | 92.93 |
| Mirosław Augustyniak | 3 | 3.03 |
| Others against | 4 | 4.04 |
| Total votes | 99 | 100.00 |
Source: Dziennik Polski

== Aftermath ==
The election of Kosiniak-Kamysz marked a generational shift in the party, with younger politicians gaining increased prominence. Kosiniak-Kamysz moved the party away from its agrarian and rural roots, stating that "People's [party name] does not mean only 'rural', but also 'universal'." Regardless, he referred to historical peasant movement leaders Wincenty Witos, Stanisław Mierzwa and Stanisław Mikołajczyk as the party's heritage. Over the following years, the party completely abandoned agrarianism.

Kosiniak-Kamysz became the party's parliamentary leader soon after the election. On 19 November, the party selected Krzysztof Hetman, Adam Jarubas, Dariusz Klimczak and Adam Struzik as its vice-chairmen.
