= Qaramurad =

Qaramurad or Karamurad may refer to:

- Böyük Qaramurad, Azerbaijan
- Kiçik Qaramurad, Azerbaijan
