= Deptuła =

Deptuła or Deptula is a surname. Notable people with the surname include:

- David Deptula, American Lieutenant General
- Leszek Deptuła (1953–2010), Polish veterinarian
- Zbigniew Deptuła (born 1962), Polish politician
