= Leshkar fortress =

- Azerbaijani: Leşkər qalaçası
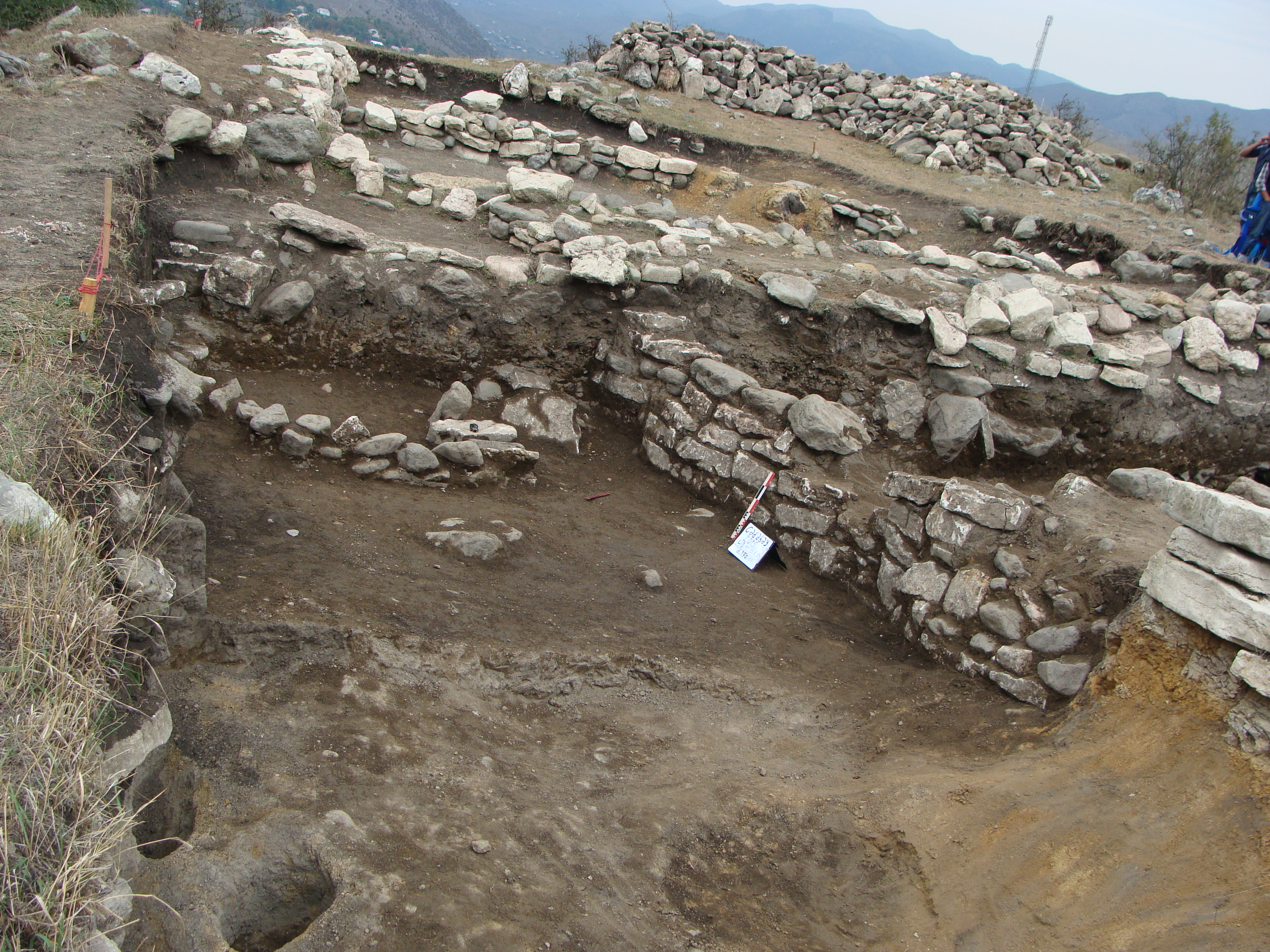
- General view of the Leshkar fortress

- Location within Azerbaijan

General information
- Type: Fortress
- Location: Kichik Garamurad, Gadabay, Azerbaijan
- Coordinates: 40.488714°N 45.752824°E
- Construction started: Late Bronze
- Completed: Early Iron Age

Technical details
- Material: limestone, pebble

Leshkar fortress is a cyclopean building-dwelling, archaeological monument belonging to the Late Bronze-Early Iron Age, located in the territory of the village of Kichik Garamurad, on the right bank of the Delma River, east of the village of Daryurd, Gedebey district.

There are about 80 cyclopean buildings in Gedebey. The castle, which was recorded as the Delma Castle by Ishag Jafarzadeh, was put into scientific circulation under the name Leshkar Castle by Tukezban Goyushova. Archaeological investigations at the monument began in 2009. It continued with certain interruptions until 2021. Investigation work at the castle continued. During the excavations, wall remains, a farm well(s), stone construction, a room, etc. were identified from the territory of the monument. Excavations were carried out on an area of approximately 500 sq./m for the purpose of studying the archaeological monument. During the excavations, the thickness of the cultural layer was determined to be 170-180 cm. During all these excavations, pottery remains, animal bones, and other artifacts were examined.

== General information ==
The fortress, which has a total area of 5.000 sq./m, is oval in shape. The walls of the fortress were arranged in three concentric rows, 10 m apart. The relatively well-preserved southern walls of the fortress are 2.5 m high, and in some places the height of the walls is up to 3 m.

As a result of the research carried out in two squares measuring 5x5m, 6x6m, 10x10m, in an area of a total of 500 sq./m near the southern wall of the fortress, the cultural layer was traced to the mainland. The depth of the cultural layer was 1.7-1.8 m depending on the relief. The excavation site revealed the remains of walls built of river stones and white stones, rooms, farm wells, fire-places, large-capacity farm jars, pottery of various contents, stone and bone tools, awls, clay seals, obsidian cutters, numerous osteological remains, etc. material cultural samples were obtained.

The main construction materials of the structures identified in Leshker fortress are river stone and limestone. In general, limestone and a mortar made from it were used in the construction of archaeological and historical architectural monuments in Gedebey area.

=== Material and cultural samples obtained from the research ===
Artifacts obtained during the research conducted at the Leshkar fortress indicate a high level of development of summer-winter economy, daily life, and craftsmanship of the Bronze Age tribes.

The remains of buildings discovered in the Leshker fortress, as well as the rich material culture samples obtained from it, are of great scientific importance for determining the plan of residential houses in cyclopean structures dating back to the Late Bronze and Early Iron Ages in Azerbaijan, especially in mountainous regions.

Clay seals of small diameter, distinguished by various embossed patterns on their working surfaces, were found in the Leshkar fortress, and the embossed dot-like patterns that completely covered the working surface of such a seal also included a simple cross image in the center. Clay seals, distinguished by their small size and coarsely made handles, are also characteristic of the Late Bronze Age monuments of Gedebey.

As a result of research conducted in two excavation areas (total area 500 sq./m, thickness of the cultural layer 190-250 cm), residential houses-rooms built of white cut and river stones, workshops, farm wells, fire-places, thousands of artifacts – pottery, bone, stoneware, clay basins used in metallurgy and their fragments, a four-sided stone mold, as well as a stove - were discovered in the territory of the fortress with adequate construction techniques for the period. Pottery is represented by hundreds of fragments of various types of vessels (cubes, jars, cups, jugs, glasses, bowls, frying pans, braziers). The fragments of pottery vessels found in Leshkar fortress belong to up to a hundred types of vessels, depending on their shapes and sizes. This fact alone proves once again the high development of pottery here and the rich culinary/cuisine culture of the Bronze Age tribes.

The fortress walls, stone structures, rich archaeological materials, fire-places and kurgans, built with advanced construction techniques, and discovered during archaeological excavations in the Leshkar fortress to this day once again prove that during the period in question, the population lived here densely and intensively, engaged in cattle-breeding and farming, and mastered such crafts as pottery, metalworking, and stone working. All these facts indicate that the Leshkar fortress was a permanent residence for a certain part of the population during the Late Bronze and Early Iron Ages.

== See also ==
- Ishag Jafarzadeh
