= Laskey =

Laskey is a surname. Notable people with the surname include:

- Alice M. Laskey (1906–1998), U.S. naval officer and biochemist
- Bill Laskey (born 1957), American former professional baseball player
- Bill Laskey (American football) (1943–2022), American former football linebacker
- Charles Laskey (1908–1998), American ballet dancer, musical theatre performer
- Sir Denis Laskey (1916–1987), British ambassador
- Michael Laskey (born 1944), English poet and editor
- Jack Laskey (born 1982), English actor, son of Michael Laskey
- John Laskey Woolcock (1862–1929), barrister and Supreme Court judge in Queensland, Australia
- Kathleen Laskey, Canadian actress, primarily associated with television roles
- Posteal Laskey, believed to be the Cincinnati Strangler, a serial killer between 1965 and 1966
- Ron Laskey (born 1945), British cell biologist and cancer researcher

== See also ==
- Laskey, Jaggard and Brown v United Kingdom, case argued before the European Court of Human Rights
- Lasky, surname
- Lackey (surname)
- Laissey
