= Gmina Szelków =

Gmina Szelków Szelków Commune
- Gmina
- Flag Coat of arms

- Location within Poland
- Coordinates (Szelków): 52°50′N 21°13′E
- Country: Poland
- Voivodeship: Masovian
- County: Maków
- Seat: Szelków

Area
  - Total: 112.93 km^{2} (43.60 sq mi)

Population (2011)
  - Total: 3,790
  - Density: 33.6/km^{2} (86.9/sq mi)

Gmina Szelków is a rural gmina (administrative district) in Maków County, Masovian Voivodeship, in east-central Poland. Its seat is the village of Szelków, which is approximately 8 kilometres (5.0 mi) south-east of Maków Mazowiecki and 67 kilometres (42 mi) north-east of Warsaw.

The gmina covers an area of 112.93 square kilometres (43.6 sq mi). In 2011, its population was 3,790, up from 3,695 in 2006.

== Villages ==
Gmina Szelków contains the villages and settlements of Bazar, Chrzanowo, Chyliny, Chyliny Leśne, Ciepielewo, Dzierżanowo, Głódki, Grzanka, Kaptury, Laski, Magnuszew Duży, Magnuszew Mały, Makowica, Nowy Strachocin, Nowy Szelków, Orzyc, Pomaski Małe, Pomaski Wielkie, Przeradowo, Rostki, Smrock-Dwór, Smrock-Kolonia, Stary Strachocin, Szelków and Zakliczewo.

== Neighbouring gminas ==
Gmina Szelków is bordered by the town of Maków Mazowiecki and by the gminas of Czerwonka, Karniewo, Obryte, Pułtusk and Rzewnie.
