= Laskar =

Laskar may refer to:

== People ==
- Abdul Rob Laskar, Indian politician from Assam
- Anamul Haque Laskar, Indian politician from Assam
- Anwar Hussain Laskar (1964–2022), Indian politician from Assam
- Aminul Haque Laskar (born 1966), Indian politician from Assam
- Jacques Laskar (born 1955), French astronomer
- Mehrab Ali Laskar, Indian politician from Assam
- Misbahul Islam Laskar, Indian politician
- Nibaran Chandra Laskar (1902–1987), Indian singer, musician, sportsman, social worker, professor and politician
- Nihar Ranjan Laskar (born 1932), Indian politician from Assam
- Rejaul Karim Laskar, Indian politician and scholar of India's foreign policy and diplomacy
- Renu C. Laskar (1932–2024), Indian-born American mathematician
- Suzam Uddin Laskar, Indian politician from Assam
- Tajamul Ali Laskar, Indian politician from Assam
- Zakir Hussain Laskar, Indian politician from Assam
- Jabed Ahmed Laskar, Indian Businessman Founder of Laskar Enterprise

== Places ==
- Laskar, Bulgaria a village in Pleven Province, Bulgaria
- Laskar Point, Antarctica
- Laskár, a village and municipality in Žilina Region, Slovakia

== Other uses ==
- Laskar Jihad, Indonesian paramilitary group

== See also ==
- Lascar (disambiguation)
- Lascars, Indian sailors who worked for the East India Company in the 17th and 18th centuries
- Lashkar-e-Taiba, a terrorist organization based in Pakistan
- Leşkər, Azerbaijan
- Lasker (disambiguation)
- Lashkar (disambiguation)
