= Laski =

Laski or Łaski may refer to the following Polish villages:

In Greater Poland Voivodeship (west-central Poland):

- Laski, Jarocin County
- Laski, Kępno County
- Laski, Turek County

In Łódź Voivodeship (central Poland):

- Laski, Pajęczno County
- Laski, Piotrków County

In Lublin Voivodeship (east Poland):

- Laski, Łuków County
- Laski, Parczew County

In Lubusz Voivodeship (west Poland):

- Laski, Świebodzin County
- Laski, Gmina Babimost
- Laski, Gmina Czerwieńsk
- Laski, Żary County

In Masovian Voivodeship (east-central Poland):

- Laski, Grójec County
- Laski, Maków County
- Laski, Radom County
- Laski, Warsaw West County
- Laski, Węgrów County

In Pomeranian Voivodeship (north Poland):

- Laski, Bytów County
- Laski, Malbork County

In Subcarpathian Voivodeship (south-east Poland)

- Laski, Bojanów County
- Łaski, Jasło County

In West Pomeranian Voivodeship (north-west Poland):

- Laski, Białogard County
- Laski, Sławno County

In other voivodeships:

- Laski, Kuyavian-Pomeranian Voivodeship (north-central Poland)
- Laski, Lesser Poland Voivodeship (south Poland)
- Laski, Lower Silesian Voivodeship (south-west Poland)
- Laski, Podlaskie Voivodeship (north-east Poland)

== Other uses ==
- Laski (surname)

== See also ==
- Laskiainen
- Lasky
- Łask
- Łask County, called powiat łaski in Polish
- Lasker (disambiguation)
