= Bleibtreustraße =

Street in Berlin-Charlottenburg, Germany

- Bleibtreustrasse
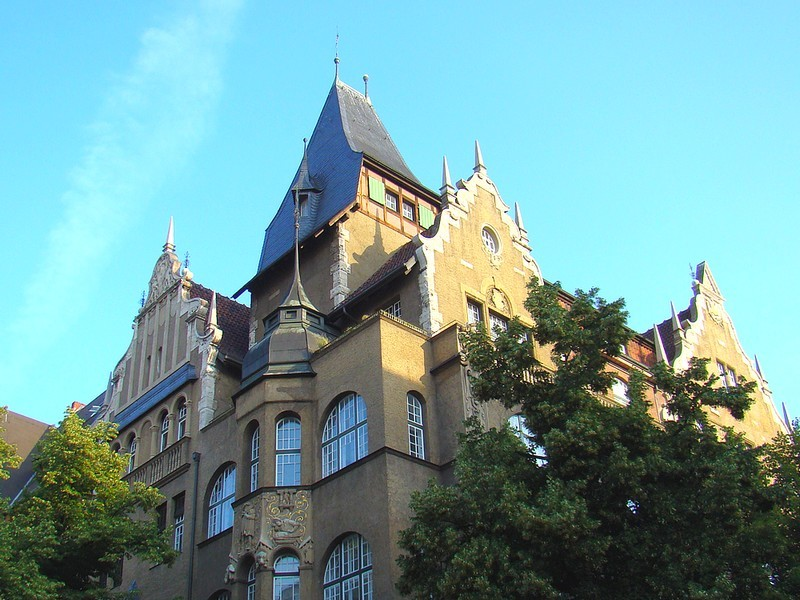
- House on Bleibtreustraße, 2008
- Interactive map of Bleibtreustraße
- Former names: Straße Nr. 12 a der Abt. V; (until 20 August 1897)
- Namesake: Georg Bleibtreu
- Type: Street
- Location: Berlin, Germany
- Quarter: Charlottenburg
- Nearest metro station: Savignyplatz
- Coordinates: 52°30′15″N 13°19′11″E
- North end: Pestalozzistraße
- Major junctions: Kantstraße; Else-Ury-Bogen; Niebuhrstraße; Mommsenstraße; Kurfürstendamm
- South end: Lietzenburger Straße; Sächsische Straße

Bleibtreustraße, or Bleibtreustrasse (see ß), is a street in the Charlottenburg district of Berlin.

== History ==
Bleibtreustraße starts at Lietzenburger Straße, crosses Kurfürstendamm, Mommsenstraße, Kantstraße and ends at Pestalozzistraße. It is connected to the neighboring Savignyplatz via the Else-Ury-Bogen, and the S-Bahn station of the same name can be reached from Bleibtreustraße by elevator

Initially, the street was simply called Straße 12a in the Abt. V development plan until August 20, 1897, when it was named after the painter and graphic artist Georg Bleibtreu, who lived in the parallel Knesebeckstraße until his death in October 1892.

It is considered to be in a "posh" area and has many shops and restaurants.

== Bleibtreustraße and the Holocaust ==
Before the Nazis rose to power in 1933, about a third of Berlin's 160,000 Jews lived in western Charlottenburg district around Bleibtreustrasse. They tended to be middle-class professional families that were so well integrated that they were caught off guard by the Nazis anti-Semitic attacks against them. Of Berlin’s 6,500 commemorative plaques to victims of Nazi persecution called "Stolpersteine", almost half are in this area.

== Commemorative plaques of prominent residents ==
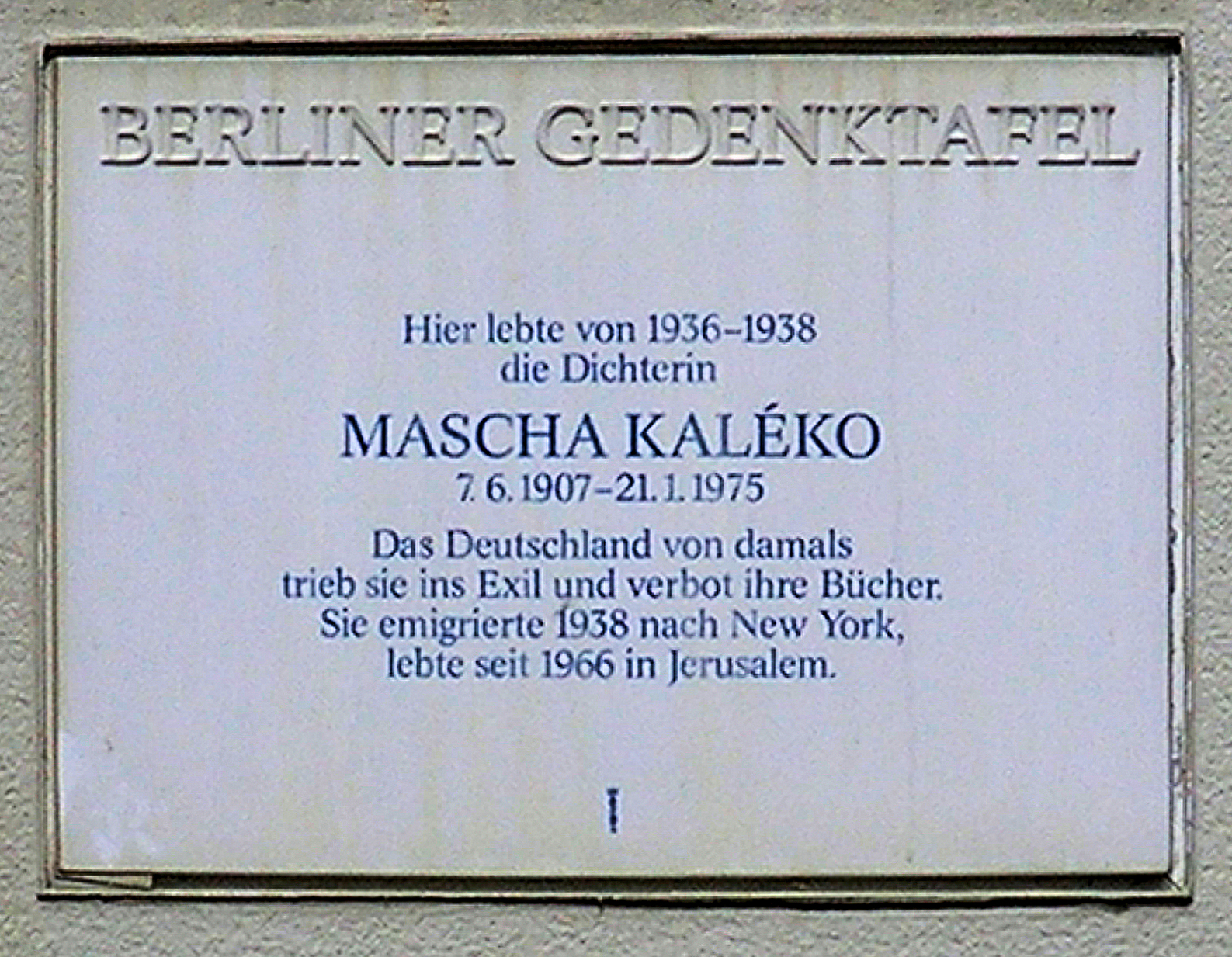

- Bleibtreustraße 10/11: Mascha Kaléko, poet, lived here between 1936 and 1938. During the Nazi era she was forced into exile, her books were banned.
- Bleibtreustraße 12: Gotthard Laske, confectioner, bibliophile and patron of the arts, committed suicide in 1936; his wife Nelly Laske was deported to Auschwitz and murdered in 1943.
- Bleibtreustraße 15: Tilla Durieux, actress, from 1903 at the Reinhardt theaters in Berlin. Emigrated 1933, returned to Berlin 1952, lived here from 1966 to 1971.

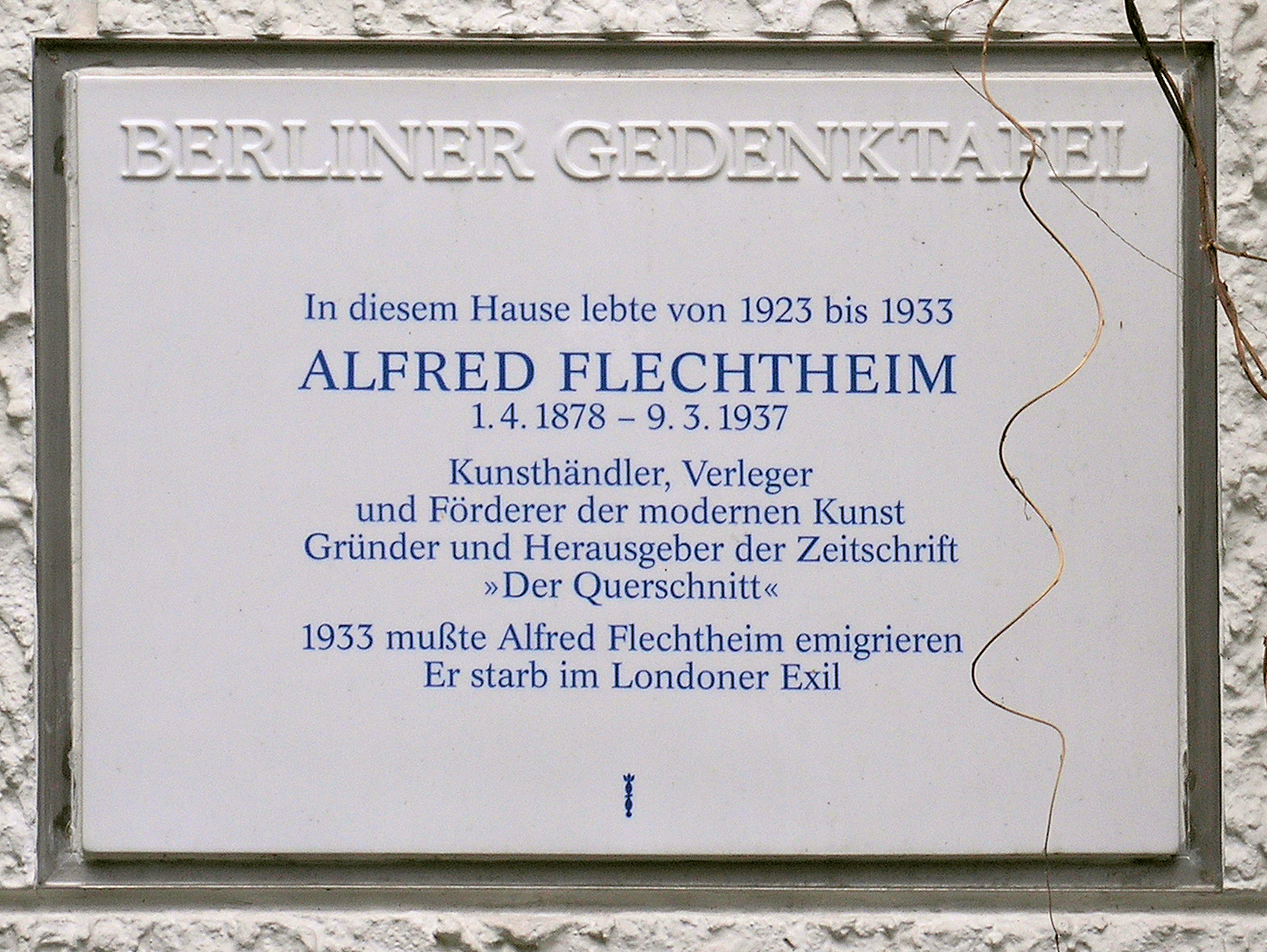

- Bleibtreustraße 15: Alfred Flechtheim, art dealer, publisher and promoter of modern art; founder and editor of the magazine Der Querschnitt, lived here between 1923 and 1933. In 1933 his art dealership was Aryanized by Nazis and he emigrated to London where he died.
- Bleibtreustraße 34/35: The first office of ORT (Organization-Rehabilitation-Training), a Jewish vocational training organization founded in 1880 in Petersburg to promote handicrafts and agriculture among Jews, was located here from 1921. In 1937, ORT opened its own technical school in Berlin
- Bleibtreustraße 38/39: Nathan Zuntz, founder of aviation medicine, professor of animal physiology, lived here from 1914 to 1919.
- Bleibtreustraße 44: Juan Luria, also Giovanni Luria, actually Johannes Lorie or Johannes Lorié was deported to the Sobibor extermination camp on May 18, 1943 and murdered on arrival.

== Deportation of the Jewish residents ==
A Jewish spring bath (mikvah) was opened at Bleibtreustraße 2 in 1927. The Jewish Community acquired the house in 1926 and opened the immersion bath on the first floor and basement, each with a rainwater and a deep-water pool as well as three deep baths. In 1935, the Jewish Welfare and Youth Office also moved into the house, followed by the Jewish General Newspaper in 1936. In 1942, the Jewish Community was forced to sell the house to Erika Brümmel, widow of the district mayor of Berlin-Mitte, who died in 1942, and the proceeds were confiscated by the Gestapo. For a time, the house served as a forced residence for Jews called a "Judenhaus," where Jewish tenants were forcibly committed before being deported to Nazi concentration camps where they were murdered. The Jewish tenants of the house were also deported, only one survived.

In 1937, the then lawyer Kurt Georg Kiesinger, later German Chancellor, moved into an apartment with his wife at Bleibtreustraße 46.

At Bleibtreustraße 4 lived SS-Gruppenführer Hermann Fegelein, a high-ranking commander in the Waffen-SS of Nazi Germany, close to Adolf Hitler and brother-in-law to Eva Braun through his marriage to her sister Gretl. He was arrested there and executed.

== Postwar ==
The building was heavily damaged by Allied bombing in 1943 and later demolished. The Jewish Community attempted for more than 20 years from 1951 to claim restitution of the property against Mrs. Brümmel. In 1956, the district of Charlottenburg built a playground on the property.

On June 27, 1970 the street became famous after a violent confrontation between members of West Berlin's red-light milieu. On behalf of brothel entrepreneur Hans Helmcke, an armed gang led by Klaus Speer attacked rival Iranian pimps at the Restaurant Bucharest, killing one of them and injuring three others. In reference to this shooting, Bleibtreustraße was also known as "Bleistreustraße" in Berlin vernacular for a long time.

== Literature ==
- Bleibtreu (120-seitiges Themenheft zur Bleibtreustraße). Perinique. Magazin Weltkulturerbe, Heft 35, 17. Dezember 2021, ISSN 1869-9952.

== See also ==
- Aryanization
- The Holocaust
- Nazi plunder
- Stolperstein
