= Szelków =

- Village
- Location within Poland
- Coordinates: 52°50′N 21°13′E
- Country: Poland
- Voivodeship: Masovian
- County: Maków
- Gmina: Szelków

Szelków [ˈʂɛlkuf] is a village in Maków County, Masovian Voivodeship, in east-central Poland. It is the seat of the gmina (administrative district) called Gmina Szelków.
