= Juan Luria =

Polish baritone

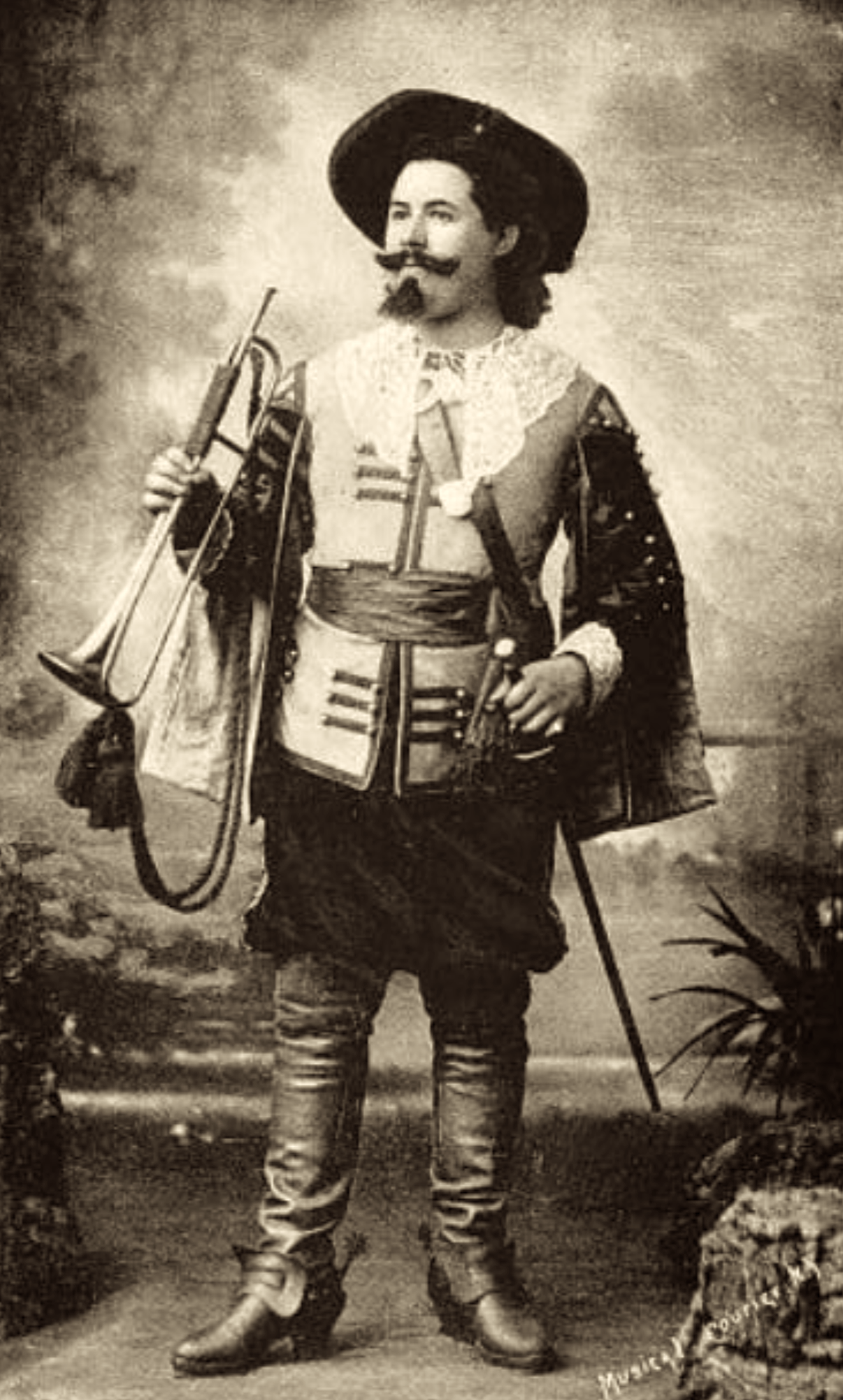
Juan Luria at the Metropolitan Opera in 1890.

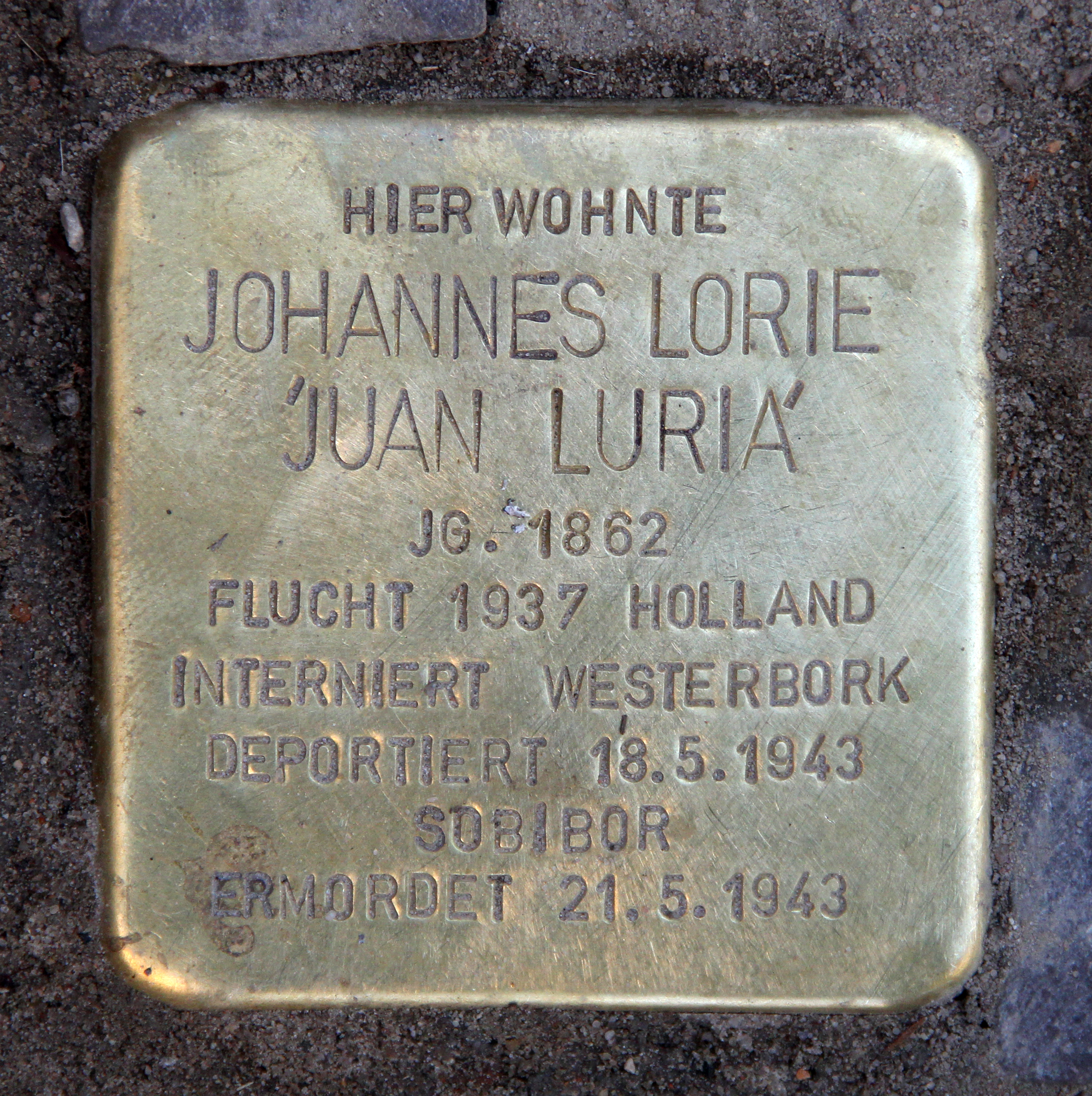
Stolperstein, Johannes Lorie Juan Luria, Bleibtreustraße 44, Berlin-Charlottenburg, Germany

Juan Luria (20 December 1862 – 21 May 1943) was a Polish-Jewish operatic baritone. Born as Johannes Lorié, he studied with Joseph Gänsbacher in Vienna.

He performed with the Stuttgart Opera (then the Stuttgart Hofheater) in 1885, then at NYC's Metropolitan Opera in the 1890–91 season. While in New York, he sang the roles of Pizarro, Kurwenal, Alberich and Gunther, the American premieres of some little remembered operas such as Diana von Solange (9 January 1891).

Among other Metropolitan Opera appearances, he sang two Meyerbeer roles: De Nevers in Les Huguenots and Count Oberthal in Le Prophète. He sang in the Berlin Theater des Westens, Brussels Théâtre de la Monnaie and the Dresden Hoftheater in 1884. In Italy, he sang under the name Giovanni Luria in Genoa and at La Scala in Milan, 1893–94, creating the first Italian Wotan. Upon retirement he turned to teaching. His students included Käthe Heidersbach, Elfriede Marherr, Michael Bohnen and the tenor Gotthelf Pistor.

In 1937, he fled to the Netherlands, teaching in Amsterdam and The Hague, but was caught after the May 1940 invasion of the Netherlands by German forces and interned in a concentration camp. He was deported from Westerbork to Sobibor on 18 May 1943, aged 81, where he died three days later, on 21 May 1943.

He recorded extensively for Favorite (Berlin, 1905–07), Pathé, Zonophone, Beka, Dacapo, Homochord, Pathé, Parlophon, and Anker. He recorded Jewish songs on Odeon.

== Recordings ==
- Duet Fray Heymann-Engel, Juan Luria on Imperial Record
- Tchaikowsky, Serenade of Don Juan, Odeon Records N. 51360
