= Chyliny, Masovian Voivodeship =

Chyliny
- Village
- Location within Poland
- Coordinates: 52°50′32″N 21°8′36″E
- Country: Poland
- Voivodeship: Masovian
- County: Maków
- Gmina: Szelków

Chyliny [xɨˈlinɨ] is a village in the administrative district of Gmina Szelków, within Maków County, Masovian Voivodeship, in east-central Poland.
