= Głódki =

- Village
- Location within Poland
- Coordinates: 52°49′38″N 21°4′12″E
- Country: Poland
- Voivodeship: Masovian
- County: Maków
- Gmina: Szelków

Głódki [ˈɡwutki] is a village in the administrative district of Gmina Szelków, within Maków County, Masovian Voivodeship, in east-central Poland.
