= Zbigniew Deptuła =

Polish politician

Starosta of Maków County
- In office 2006 – 12 February 2024
- Preceded by: Kazimierz Adam Białobrzeski
- Succeeded by: Mirosław Augustyniak

Personal details
- Born: 1 March 1962 (age 64) Smrock-Dwór, Masovian Voivodeship, Poland
- Party: Polish People's Party

Zbigniew Roman Deptuła (born 1 March 1962) is a Polish politician from the Polish People's Party. He has served as member of the Sejm from 2001 to 2005.
