= Rostki, Maków County =

Rostki
- Village
- Location within Poland
- Coordinates: 52°49′19″N 21°4′19″E
- Country: Poland
- Voivodeship: Masovian
- County: Maków
- Gmina: Szelków

Rostki [ˈrɔstki] is a village in the administrative district of Gmina Szelków, within Maków County, Masovian Voivodeship, in east-central Poland.
