= Nowy Strachocin =

- Village
- Location within Poland
- Coordinates: 52°47′56″N 21°13′37″E
- Country: Poland
- Voivodeship: Masovian
- County: Maków
- Gmina: Szelków

Nowy Strachocin [ˈnɔvɨ straˈxɔt͡ɕin] is a village in the administrative district of Gmina Szelków, within Maków County, Masovian Voivodeship, in east-central Poland.
