= Dzierżanowo, Maków County =

Dzierżanowo
- Village
- Location within Poland
- Coordinates: 52°48′N 21°4′E
- Country: Poland
- Voivodeship: Masovian
- County: Maków
- Gmina: Szelków

Dzierżanowo [d͡ʑɛrʐaˈnɔvɔ] is a village in the administrative district of Gmina Szelków, within Maków County, Masovian Voivodeship, in east-central Poland.
