= Bazar, Masovian Voivodeship =

Bazar
- Village
- Location within Poland
- Coordinates: 52°51′53″N 21°7′15″E
- Country: Poland
- Voivodeship: Masovian
- County: Maków
- Gmina: Szelków

Bazar [ˈbazar] is a village in the administrative district of Gmina Szelków, within Maków County, Masovian Voivodeship, in east-central Poland.
