= Chrzanowo, Gmina Szelków =

Chrzanowo
- Village
- Location within Poland
- Coordinates: 52°50′16″N 21°03′53″E
- Country: Poland
- Voivodeship: Masovian
- County: Maków
- Gmina: Szelków

Chrzanowo [xʂaˈnɔvɔ] is a village in the administrative district of Gmina Szelków, within Maków County, Masovian Voivodeship, in east-central Poland.
