= Nowy Szelków =

- Village
- Location within Poland
- Coordinates: 52°50′17″N 21°13′3″E
- Country: Poland
- Voivodeship: Masovian
- County: Maków
- Gmina: Szelków

Nowy Szelków [ˈnɔvɨ ˈʂɛlkuf] is a village in the administrative district of Gmina Szelków, within Maków County, Masovian Voivodeship, in east-central Poland.
