= Chyliny Leśne =

- Village
- Location within Poland
- Coordinates: 52°51′6″N 21°9′12″E
- Country: Poland
- Voivodeship: Masovian
- County: Maków
- Gmina: Szelków
- Population: 130

Chyliny Leśne [xɨˈlinɨ ˈlɛɕnɛ] is a village in the administrative district of Gmina Szelków, within Maków County, Masovian Voivodeship, in east-central Poland.

The village had a population of 130(as of 2008).
