= Makowica, Masovian Voivodeship =

Makowica
- Village
- Location within Poland
- Coordinates: 52°52′N 21°8′E
- Country: Poland
- Voivodeship: Masovian
- County: Maków
- Gmina: Szelków

Makowica [makɔˈvit͡sa] is a village in the administrative district of Gmina Szelków, within Maków County, Masovian Voivodeship, in east-central Poland.
