= Grzanka, Masovian Voivodeship =

Grzanka
- Village
- Location within Poland
- Coordinates: 52°50′52″N 21°7′29″E
- Country: Poland
- Voivodeship: Masovian
- County: Maków
- Gmina: Szelków
- Time zone: UTC+1 (CET)
  - Summer (DST): UTC+2 (CEST)
- Vehicle registration: WMA

Grzanka [ˈɡʐanka] is a village in the administrative district of Gmina Szelków, within Maków County, Masovian Voivodeship, in east-central Poland.

During the German occupation of Poland (World War II), the Germans murdered 50 patients of the hospital in Maków Mazowiecki in the village (see Nazi crimes against the Polish nation).
