= Orzyc, Masovian Voivodeship =

Orzyc
- Village
- Location within Poland
- Coordinates: 52°49′N 21°11′E
- Country: Poland
- Voivodeship: Masovian
- County: Maków
- Gmina: Szelków

Orzyc [ˈɔʐɨt͡s] is a village in the administrative district of Gmina Szelków, within Maków County, Masovian Voivodeship, in east-central Poland.
