= Ciepielewo =

- Village
- Location within Poland
- Coordinates: 52°50′N 21°8′E
- Country: Poland
- Voivodeship: Masovian
- County: Maków
- Gmina: Szelków
- Population: 226

Ciepielewo [t͡ɕɛpjɛˈlɛvɔ] is a village in the administrative district of Gmina Szelków, within Maków County, Masovian Voivodeship, in east-central Poland.
