= Magnuszew Duży =

- Village
- Location within Poland
- Coordinates: 52°49′N 21°13′E
- Country: Poland
- Voivodeship: Masovian
- County: Maków
- Gmina: Szelków

Magnuszew Duży [maɡˈnuʂɛf ˈduʐɨ] is a village in the administrative district of Gmina Szelków, within Maków County, Masovian Voivodeship, in east-central Poland.
