= Kaptury, Maków County =

Kaptury
- Village
- Location within Poland
- Coordinates: 52°52′36″N 21°5′43″E
- Country: Poland
- Voivodeship: Masovian
- County: Maków
- Gmina: Szelków

Kaptury [kapˈturɨ] is a village in the administrative district of Gmina Szelków, within Maków County, Masovian Voivodeship, in east-central Poland.
