= Pomaski Wielkie =

- Village
- Location within Poland
- Coordinates: 52°49′N 21°6′E
- Country: Poland
- Voivodeship: Masovian
- County: Maków
- Gmina: Szelków

Pomaski Wielkie [pɔˈmaski ˈvjɛlkʲɛ] is a village in the administrative district of Gmina Szelków, within Maków County, Masovian Voivodeship, in east-central Poland.
