= Ernst Laske =

German antiquarian seller

Ernst Laske (born 9 August 1915 in Berlin; died 11 May 2004 in Kibbutz Bror Chail, Israel) was a German-Israeli book antiquarian and bibliophile.

== Early life ==
Ernst Laske was the only son of the clothing merchant, art patron and bibliophile Gotthard Laske (1882–1936) and his wife Nelly. Laske grew up in Berlin. In reaction to the rise of the Nazis, he joined the Zionist movement, but hesitated for a long time to leave Germany. His father committed suicide in 1936, and his sister had obtained an affidavit to South Africa and emigrated there. Laske worried about leaving his mother alone in Berlin. Nelly Laske was murdered in Auschwitz in 1943.

== Escape from Nazi persecution ==
In 1938, Ernst Laske took part in a hachshara in Grüsen, Hesse, a preparatory course for the aliyah to what was then Palestine. On 9 November 1938 their residence was attacked by National Socialists and Laske was beaten up so badly that he almost went blind in one eye. The severely injured man dragged himself 30 kilometers to a hospital. There Nazis picked him up again and deported him to Buchenwald concentration camp. After his Zionist friends got him a visa for Denmark, Laske managed to gain release from the concentration camp and escape to Denmark. In 1943, he was one of the Jews who managed to escape deportation of Jews from Denmark in fishing boats to Sweden.

In February 1947, Laske set out for Palestine with his wife and daughter Nurit on one of the illegal immigrant ships. However, the "Chaim Arlosorof" was boarded by the British Navy off Haifa and the Laske family was interned on Cyprus. At the beginning of 1948, immigration finally succeeded. The Laske family became co-founders of the kibbutz "Ne'ot Mordechai" in northern Galilee.

== Antiquarian bookshop in Tel Aviv ==
In the mid-1970s, Ernst Laske left the kibbutz and started a new life in Tel Aviv. For about two decades, he ran the antiquarian bookshop in the "Landsberger" bookstore on Tel Aviv's Ben Jehuda Street. He quickly became an institution for all those interested in German books and German history. He gladly invited his customers - among them publishers and antiquarians from Germany - to his apartment on Jabotinsky Street in Tel Aviv. In his library there were also some of his father's bibliophile treasures, which he had been able to save for emigration, stored in a box.

Every two years Laske traveled to Europe to meet friends. During a visit to Berlin in September 1993, he became a member of the Pirckheimer Society. At the age of 80, Ernst Laske retired from the book business. He spent the last years of his life in a retirement home on Kibbutz Bror Chail in southern Israel, near his grandson's family. He is also buried there.
