= Rick Lasky =

- Born: Chicago, Illinois
- Occupations: Consultant; Author; Motivational speaker Fire chief
- Children: 1 Son, 1 Daughter
- Awards: International Society of Fire Service Instructors "Innovator of the Year", 1996
- Website: www.chieflasky.com

Richard "Rick" Lasky is an emergency services consultant, author, motivational speaker, and former fire chief of the Lewisville, Texas, Fire Department the Coeur d’Alene, Idaho Fire Department, and the Estes Valley Fire Protection District Estes Park, Colorado, as well as serving as the interim chief of the Trophy Club, Texas Fire Department, and currently serving as the interim chief of the Lucas, Texas Fire Department. Originally from the Chicago area, Lasky worked in various capacities for police and fire departments in Illinois and Idaho before moving to Lewisville, where he was the city's fire chief for 11 years. He retired as chief in Lewisville in 2011 to become a full-time consultant and educator. He has written one book and co-authored another.

== Early life ==
Lasky was born in Chicago, Illinois, and attended Lyons Township High School in La Grange. Although he considered playing Major League Baseball with the Chicago White Sox after some success in the sport, he eventually worked for the police departments in Justice and Willow Springs before becoming a firefighter paramedic in Bedford Park. As a battalion commander for the Darien–Woodridge Fire Protection District, Lasky was named the 1996 "Innovator of the Year" by the International Society of Fire Service Instructors for creating a training program aimed towards saving injured firefighters. Lasky became the chief of the Coeur d'Alene, Idaho, Fire Department in 1998, where he attracted praise for his reforms to the department there.

== Lewisville chief ==
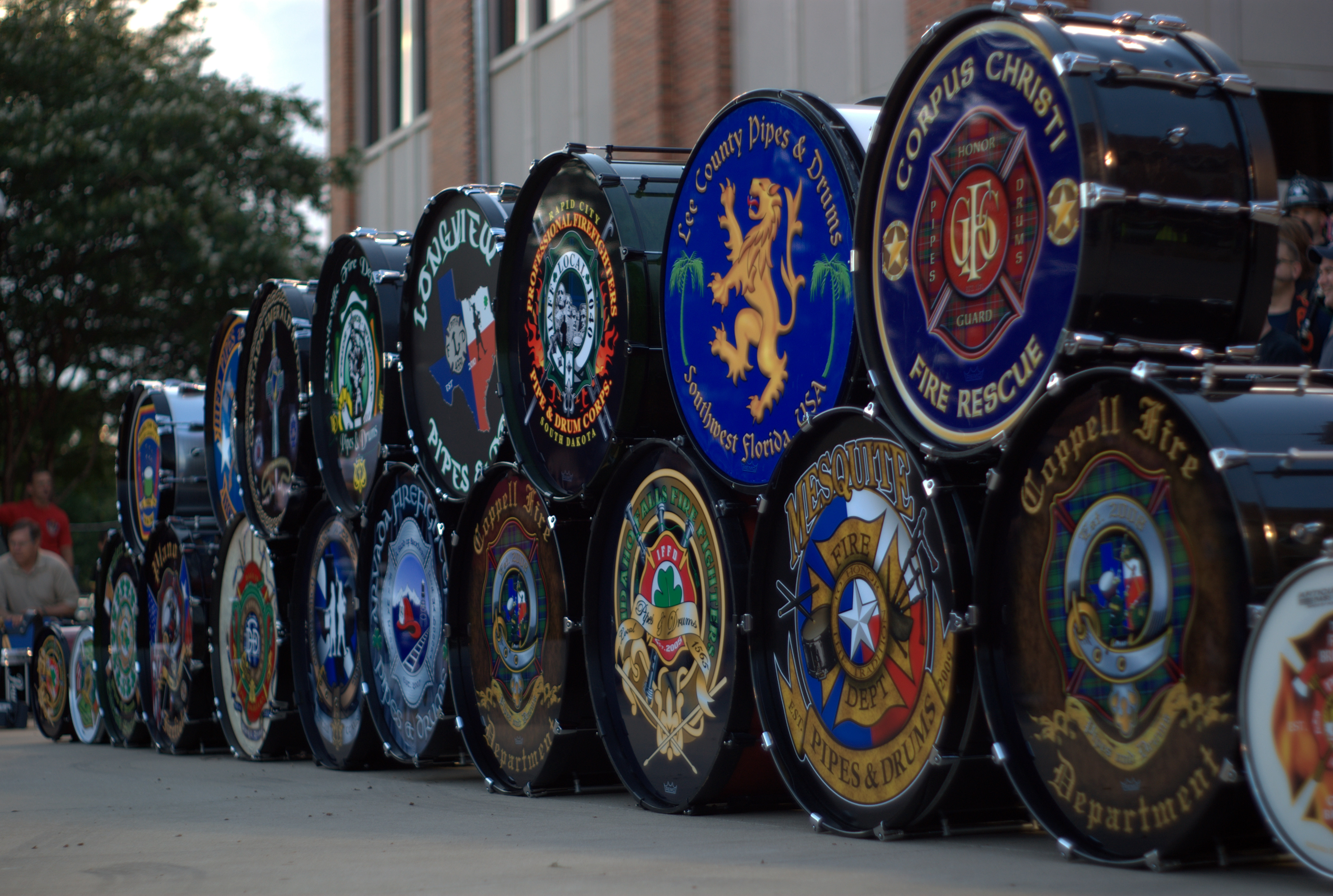
Stacked bass drums during the 2011 Keeping Tradition Alive event in Lewisville

Lasky was hired as chief of the fire department in Lewisville, Texas, in April 2000. After the September 11 attacks, Lasky, who knew many New York City firefighters and was a close friend of chief Peter Ganci, and the Lewisville Fire Department gained national attention when they raised over $200,000 for the families of New York City Firefighters. The fundraising effort caught the attention of John Travolta, who visited Lewisville as a favor to Lasky while promoting the film Ladder 49. In 2004, Lasky formed a bagpipe band and honor guard for the Lewisville Fire Department, and in 2008, the department began holding the Keeping Tradition Alive Symposium, which brings hundreds of members of various bagpipe bands and honor guards representing various firefighting units across the country. In 2011, Lasky was honored on the floor of the U.S. House of Representatives by Congressman Michael C. Burgess.

== Consultant ==
Lasky retired in 2011 after 11 years as chief of the Lewisville Fire Department, and began consulting full-time with John Salka, who led the New York City Fire Department's 18th Battalion. They operate Five Alarm Leadership, LLC, which provides consulting aimed towards improving safety and efficiency in fire departments. He has authored a book, Pride & Ownership: A Firefighter's Love of the Job, co-hosts a firefighting-themed podcast, Command Post, and gives presentations and speeches at fire departments across the country.

== Works ==
- Lasky, Rick (2006-06-30). Pride & Ownership: A Firefighter's Love of the Job. Tulsa, Oklahoma: PennWell. ISBN 978-1-59370-078-2. OCLC 64896524.
- Lasky, Rick; Salka, John (2013-03-31). Five Alarm Leadership: From the Firehouse to the Fireground. Tulsa, Oklahoma: PennWell. ISBN 978-1-59370-234-2. OCLC 819641586.
