= Gotthard Laske =

German confectioner, bibliophile, and patron of the arts

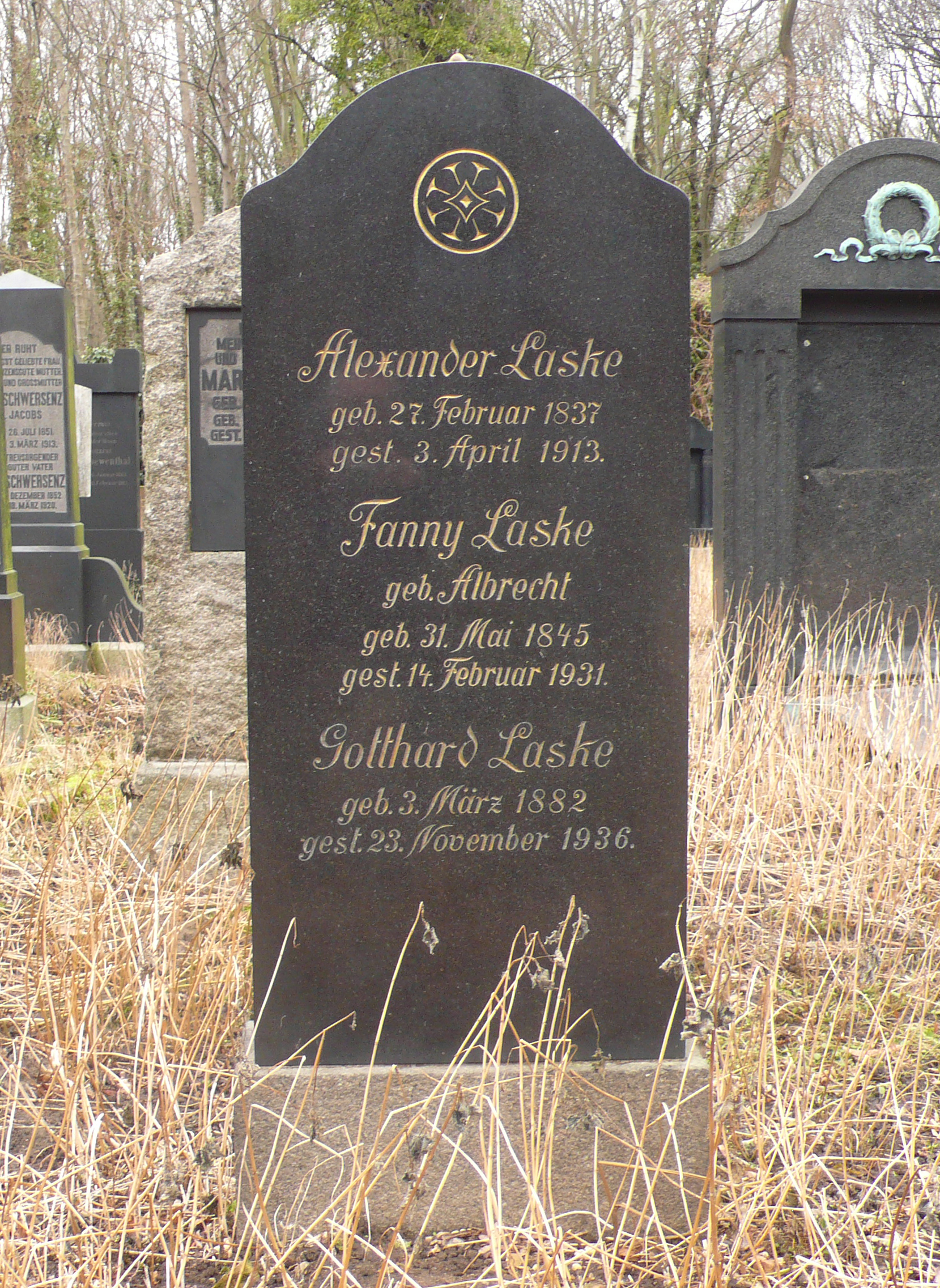
Gotthard Laske's grave in the Jewish cemetery in Berlin-Weißensee

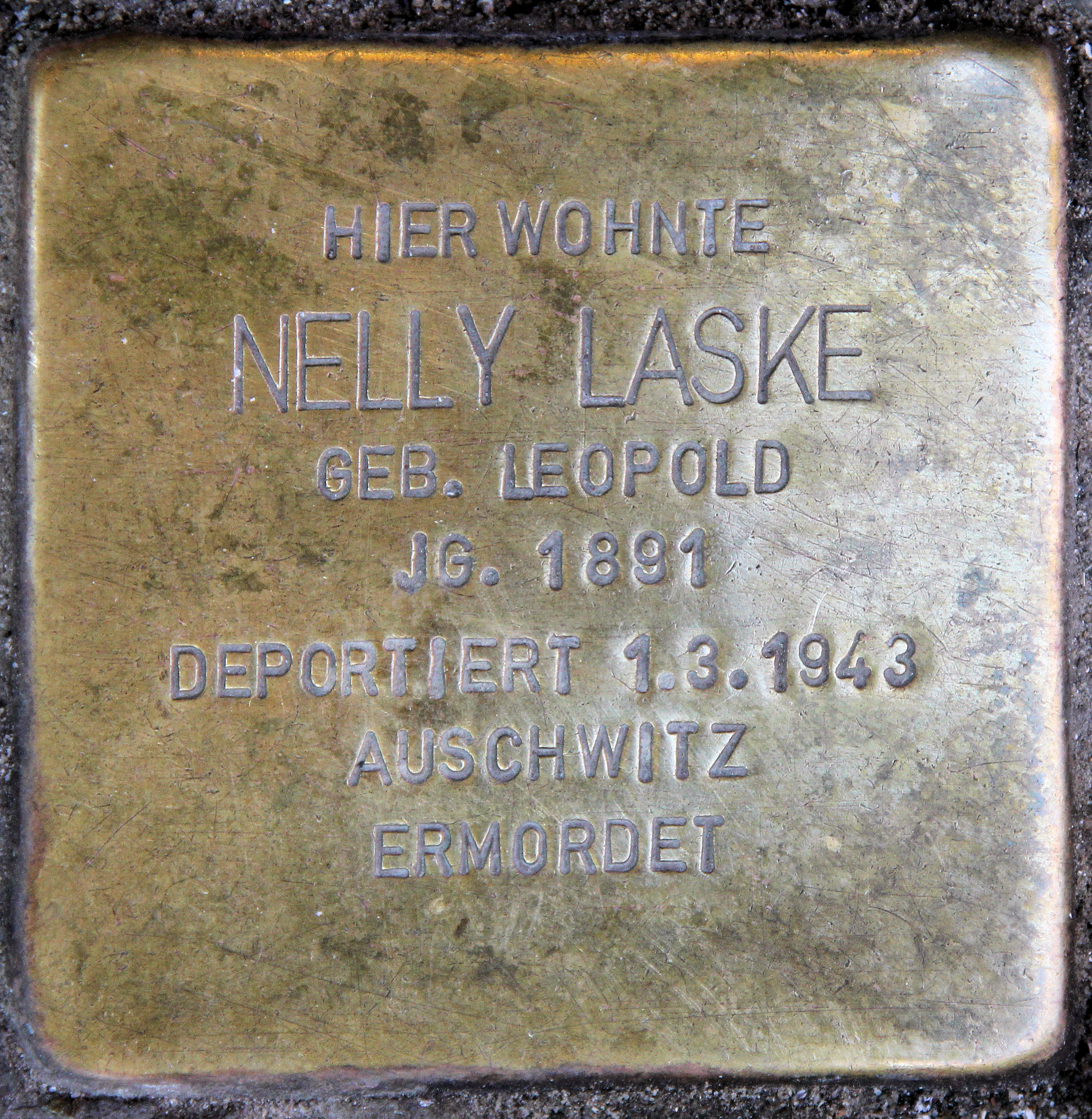
Stumbling stone for Laske's wife Nelly, in front of the house, Bleibtreustraße 25, in Berlin-Charlottenburg

Gotthard Laske (March 3, 1882 – November 23, 1936) was a German confectioner, bibliophile, and patron of the arts.

== Life ==
Laske collected books that were beautifully and lavishly printed and bound. His library contained about 10,000 volumes. In addition, he collected paintings and prints. He remunerated artists with suits and other garments, which he had custom-made in his company. Laske encouraged the printing of many poems at the Officina Serpentis and paid the production costs. Likewise, he donated many prints to the members of the bibliophile societies to which he belonged. He was particularly interested in collecting books, manuscripts and drawings by Paul Scheerbart. On Laske's fiftieth birthday, the Berlin Fontane Evening had a capriccio printed by Josef Maria Frank about this, in which Laske's hunt for a Scheerbart manuscript is described.

== Nazi persecution ==
When the Nazis came to power in 1933, Laske was persecuted because he was Jewish. Laske took his own life in 1936 after his life's work had been destroyed by the National Socialists.

His wife Nelly Laske, whose last place of residence was in Berlin's Bleibtreustraße, was deported to the Auschwitz concentration camp in 1943. The son Ernst Laske was able to emigrate to Israel with some of his father's books and ran an antiquarian bookshop there for many years. Most of the books in Laske's possession were sold by the Berlin antiquarian bookshop Albert Zimmermann (formerly Heinrich Rosenberg and Albert Zimmermann). The two catalogs in which Laske's books are listed were printed in only a few copies and are among the greatest bibliophile rarities. Gotthard Laske was buried in the Jewish cemetery in Berlin-Weißensee.

== Literature ==
- Herrmann Meyer: Privatdrucke von und für Gotthard Laske. Officina Serpentis, Berlin 1932.
- Julius Rodenberg: Deutsche Pressen. Eine Bibliographie. Amalthea-Verlag, Zürich [u. a.] : 1925–1931, Hauptband, S. 160.
- Fritz Homeyer: Deutsche Juden als Bibliophile und Antiquare, 2. Auflage, Tübingen: Mohr Siebeck, 1966 (Schriftenreihe wissenschaftlicher Abhandlungen des Leo Baeck Instituts; 10), S. 50–52.

== See also ==
The Holocaust
