= Karl Bleibtreu =

German writer (1859–1928)

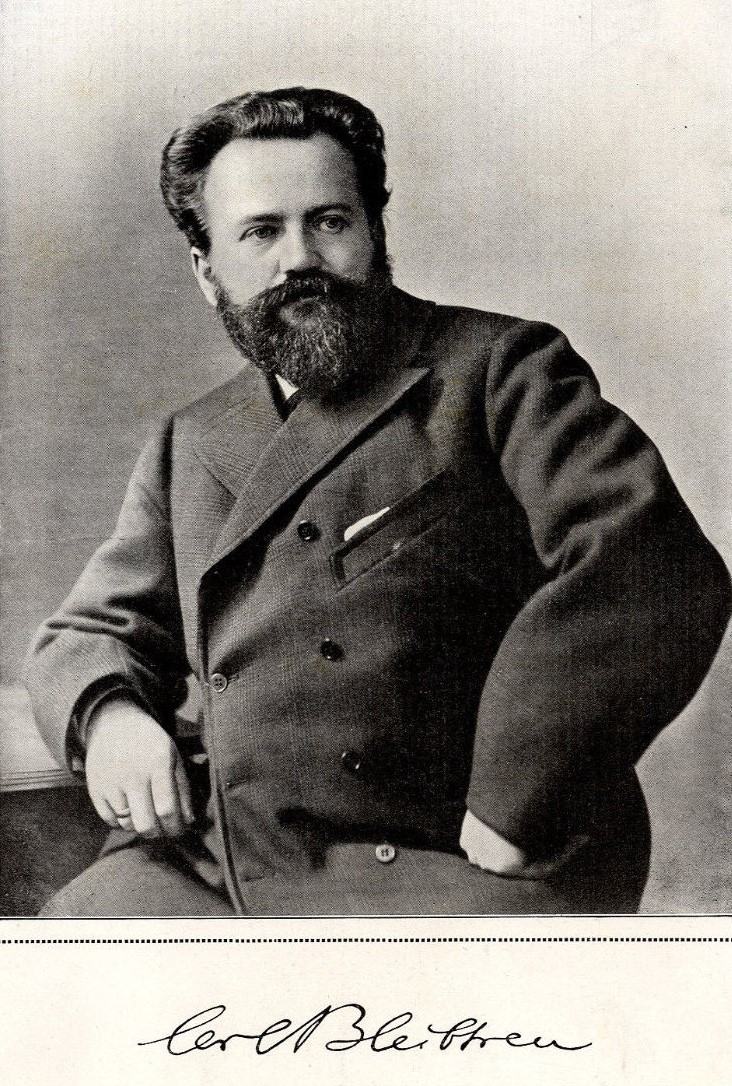
Carl Bleibtreu, 1909

Karl August Bleibtreu (January 13, 1859 – January 30, 1928) was a German writer who promoted naturalism in German literature. He was noted for his aggressive and dogmatic style of criticism, linked to a nationalistic and sometimes antisemitic agenda. His later work was heavily influenced by Nietzsche's theory of the übermensch.

== Life ==
Bleibtreu was born in Berlin, the son of the battle painter Georg Bleibtreu.

After abandoning his studies in 1884 at the Faculty of Arts in Berlin, Bleibtreu travelled all over Europe, visiting Belgium, Hungary, Italy and the UK. In the same year he became editor of the Kleinen Tagblatts, a Berlin newspaper. From 1885 he worked as a freelance writer in Berlin-Charlottenburg, where he met Michael Georg Conrad, with whom from 1888 to 1890 he worked on the magazine Die Gesellschaft: realistische Wochenschrift für Literatur, Kunst und Leben (Society: realistic weekly for literature, art and life).

In 1886, he published the work which made his name, Revolution der Literatur. This proposed a programmatic body of literature dedicated to an Émile Zola-style of systematic naturalism. In 1890, together with Konrad Alberti, Bleibtreu founded the Deutsche Bühne (German Theatre) in Berlin, as a rival to the then important Freie Bühne (Open Theatre). The project was not very successful and failed shortly thereafter. From 1908 he lived in Zurich.

== Literary theory ==
Bleibtreu was considered an important representative of naturalism in German literature. This he promoted as an editor, producer, director and critic. His writings were characterized by their intolerance of opposition. He saw himself as an educator and leader of German literature, often as its saviour.

As a result of his excessive self-centeredness and egotism he acquired both friends and many enemies. He described himself as a poet and genius turned into a great statesman or commander. Like his friend Michael Georg Conrad, he waged a lifelong battle against contemporary literary critics. Literary critics, in his eyes, were of great importance for the success of an author, because they had power to make or break reputations. He described himself as an anti-Semite and suspected a conspiracy of the Jewish press. Bleibtreu insisted that critics should evaluate only the real quality of a literary work and not - as so often in this period - judge on the basis of aversion to the author or his morals and political intentions. In Revolution der Literatur Bleibtreu described this demand in his characteristically lurid style:

If Shakespeare had been the greatest villain [...], would we be less committed to admire him? By heaven! If Jesus Christ showed me bad poetry, I would thrash him mercilessly, all my moral respect and adoration notwithstanding."

He stated that he did not care whether an author was poor or rich, but only respected talent. His literary-critical style was arrogant and insulting, using humiliating and contemptuous expressions for his opponents.

He argued that new German literary forms should follow closely on the Sturm und Drang movement. This new movement should represent realism. Bleibtreu's worldview was shaped by heroism, nationalism, machismo and pessimistic world-weariness. At the height of his career, he even claimed that his work should be regarded as the nucleus of future literature. In reality, his influence was limited only to the short period from 1885 to circa 1890.

After the publication of Gerhart Hauptmann's naturalist drama „Vor Sonnenaufgang“ ("Before Dawn") Bleibreu's call for "revolutionary literature" seemed to be fulfilled. However, from that point on he wanted nothing more to do with "consistent naturalism" („konsequenten Naturalismus“), which he even called "so-called realistic imitation of the Jewish school." He envied the successful new authors, as their success marginalized him.

His later writings show the influence of Friedrich Nietzsche. He entitled his book on Byron, Byron der Übermensch in reference to Nietzsche's theories in Thus Spoke Zarathustra. However, he characteristically belittled other writers who appropriated Nietzschean rhetoric, commenting on the poet Greta Meisel-Hess that,

Everyone today wants to speak with Zarathustra's tongue...even Meisel-Hess showers out poems in Nietzsche's mode in her rhapsodic masturbation.

After 1890, he was mainly involved in the writing of historical novels and books on military issues, especially the Napoleonic era. In 1907 he wrote Der Wahre Shakespeare, a book proposing that Roger Manners, 5th Earl of Rutland was the true author of the canon of William Shakespeare, after an earlier critic had suggested that he may have written the comedies. The theory had a brief but significant flourishing. He died in Locarno, Switzerland.

== Works ==
- Schlechte Gesellschaft, Erzählung, 1885
- Lyrisches Tagebuch, heterogene Lyrik, 1885
- Andere Zeiten, andere Lieder, 1885
- Revolution der Literatur, 1886, Reprint 1973, Verlag Max Niemeyer, ISBN 978-3-484-19022-1
- Lord Byron, 1886
- Der Dämon, Hochstildrama, 1887
- Die Gesellschaft: realistische Wochenschrift für Litteratur, Kunst und Leben Ed. 1888–1890, with M. G. Conrad (subtitle varies)
- Grössenwahn, novel, 3 vols, 1888, Reprint 2008, Verlag Directmedia Publishing, ISBN 978-3-86640-314-7
- Der Kampf um's Dasein der Literatur, 1888
- Schicksal, Hochstildrama, 1888
- Geschichte der englischen Literatur, 2 Bände, 1888
- Schicksal, Schauspiel, 1888
- Napoleon I., 1889
- Zur Psychologie der Zukunft, 1890
- Byron der Übermensch. Sein Leben und sein Dichten, 1890
- Massenmord. Eine Zukunftsschlacht, 1893
- Schlacht bei Wörth am 6. August 1870, 1898, Reprint 2009 Verlag Rockstuhl, Bad Langensalza, ISBN 978-3-86777-072-9
- Von Robespierre zu Buddha W. Friedrich, 1898
- Marschälle, Generäle, Soldaten Napoleons des Ersten, 1899
- Waterloo, Schlachtdichtung, 1902
- Die Verrohung der Literatur. Ein Beitrag zur Haupt- und Sudermännerei 1903
- Schlacht von Königgrätz am 3. Juli 1866, 1903, Reprint 2006 Verlag Rockstuhl, Bad Langensalza, ISBN 978-3-938997-65-9
- Schlacht bei Spichern am 6. August 1870, 1903, Reprint 2009 Verlag Rockstuhl, Bad Langensalza, ISBN 978-3-86777-071-2
- Schlacht bei Weißenburg am 4. August 1870, 1903, Reprint 2009 Verlag Rockstuhl, Bad Langensalza, ISBN 978-3-86777-070-5
- H. P. Blavatsky und die Geheimlehre, 1904
- Die Vertreter des Jahrhunderts, 3 vols, 1904 (Volume III: Theosophie)
- Düppel-Alsen - Deutsch-Dänischer Krieg, 1906, Reprint 2009 Verlag Rockstuhl, Bad Langensalza, ISBN 978-3-86777-013-2
- Langensalza und Der Mainfeldzug 1866, 1906, Reprint 2007 Verlag Rockstuhl, Bad Langensalza, ISBN 978-3-934748-73-6
- Schlacht bei Colombey am 14. August 1870, 1906, Reprint 2009 Verlag Rockstuhl, Bad Langensalza, ISBN 978-3-86777-073-6
- Der Marquis de Sade in: Die Gegenwart. Zeitschrift für Literatur, Wirtschaftsleben und Kunst 72–73 (1907) pp. 134–136 & 151-154. Reprint in: Hans-Ulrich Seifert & Michael Farin, eds.: "Der Mensch ist böse." Ein erotisch-philosophisches Lesebuch: Marquis de Sade Heyne, München 1990 ISBN 3-453-04354-5 S. 7 - 27. Microfiche-Ausg. der Zs: Vlg. Harald Fischer, Erlangen 2003 ISBN 3-89131-444-2
- Belagerung von Straßburg 15. August bis zum 28. September 1870, 1910, Reprint 2009 Verlag Rockstuhl, Bad Langensalza, ISBN 978-3-86777-074-3
- Geschichte der deutschen Nationalliteratur von Goethes Tod bis zur Gegenwart, 2 Teile in einem Band, 1912
- Die Entscheidungsschlacht und andere Kriegsnovellen, 1915
- Bismarck. Ein Weltroman in 4 Bänden 1915. In Projekt Gutenberg-DE :
- Englands große Waterloo-Lüge - Zu den Jahrhunderttagen von 1815, Berlin - Leipzig 1915
- Der Aufgang des Abendlandes, Leipzig 1925 (under the pseudonym John Macready)
