= Smrock-Dwór =

- Village
- Location within Poland
- Coordinates: 52°50′27″N 21°9′51″E
- Country: Poland
- Voivodeship: Masovian
- County: Maków
- Gmina: Szelków

Smrock-Dwór [ˈsmrɔt͡sk ˈdvur] is a village in the administrative district of Gmina Szelków, within Maków County, Masovian Voivodeship, in east-central Poland.
