= Lasky =

Lasky is a surname. Notable people with the surname include:

- Art Lasky (1909–1980), American heavyweight professional boxer
- Bette Lasky (born 1947), American politician; New Hampshire state senator and former state representative
- Benjamin Lasky (born 2000), American musician and former Youtuber
- David Lasky (born 1967), American cartoonist
- Dorothea Lasky (born 1978), American poet
- Floria Lasky (1923–2007), American lawyer in the theater world
- Jesse L. Lasky (1880–1958), American movie producer and founder of Paramount Pictures
- Jesse L. Lasky Jr. (1910–1988), American screenwriter, often with his wife Pat Silver-Lasky
- Kathryn Lasky (born 1944), American author
- Mark Lasky (1954–1983), American cartoonist
- Melvin J. Lasky (1920–2004), American journalist
- Mitch Lasky (born 1962), American venture capitalist
- Pat Silver-Lasky (1925–2025), American actress, screenwriter, and writer, often with her husband Jesse Lasky, Jr.
- Rick Lasky (fl. 1990s–2020s), American emergency services consultant, author, motivational speaker
- Victor Lasky (1918–1990), American newspaper columnist and writer

== See also ==
- Laski (surname)
- Laskey
- Lasky, Ukraine
