= Lasker =

Lasker may refer to:

- Lasker (surname)
- Lasker, North Carolina
- Lasker Award, an award for medical research
- Lasker's Manual of Chess, a book on the game of chess by Emanuel Lasker.
- Lasker–Noether theorem or Lasker Ring, a mathematical theorem
- NOAAS Reuben Lasker (R 228), an American fisheries and oceanographic research ship in commission in the National Oceanic and Atmospheric Administration fleet since 2014

== See also ==
- Lascar (disambiguation)
- Laskar (disambiguation)
- Laski (disambiguation)
- Łask, a town in Poland
