= Alice M. Laskey =

U.S. Naval Officer and biochemist

- Born: April 5, 1906; Duluth, Minnesota, U.S.
- Died: November 22, 1998 (aged 92); Bethesda, Maryland, U.S.
- Education: University of Minnesota; Georgetown University
- Scientific career
- Fields: Biochemistry
- Workplaces: National Institutes of Health

Alice M. Laskey (April 5, 1906 - November 22, 1998) was a U.S. Naval Officer and biochemist and who worked in the National Institutes of Health division of research grants and the National Institute of Allergy and Infectious Diseases. She was a lieutenant commander during World War II.

== Life ==
Laskey was born on April 5, 1906 in Duluth, Minnesota. She graduated from University of Minnesota. In the 1930s, Laskey was a medical technician and later biochemist at the Veterans Administration Hospital laboratories at Fort Snelling, Dwight, Illinois, and Long Island. She completed a master's degree in biochemistry at Georgetown University. Laskey was a lieutenant commander who served in WAVES and was stationed at the National Naval Medical Center.

After World War II, Laskey joined the National Institutes of Health (NIH). She was a chemist at the National Institute of Allergy and Infectious Diseases (NIAID). At this time, she assisted in research on quantifying how much thyrotrophin (TSH) was in a sample, which was important for endocrinology work to measure hormone levels. In 1963, Laskey left the NIH division of research grants (DRG) to return to NIAID and the United States National Library of Medicine. Laskey returned to DRG 's research documentation section in the statistics and analysis branch in 1965. At this time, she joined the MeSH (Medical Subject Headings) staff during this time as the Subject Headings Specialist. She was a Fellow of the American Association for the Advancement of Science. She served as president of the D.C. chapter of the National Graduate Women of Science. In 1970, Laskey retired from her position as a supervisory scientific reference analyst after forty years of working for the U.S. Federal Government.

Laskey died November 22, 1998, at the age of 92 in Bethesda, Maryland due to diabetes-related complications.
