= Leşkər =

- Location within Azerbaijan
- Coordinates: 40°32′46″N 45°41′16″E
- Country: Azerbaijan
- Rayon: Gadabay
- Municipality: Kiçik Qaramurad
- Time zone: UTC+4 (AZT)
  - Summer (DST): UTC+5 (AZT)

Leşkər (also, Ləşkər and Leshker) is a village in the Gadabay Rayon of Azerbaijan. The village forms part of the municipality of Kiçik Qaramurad.
