= Lask =

Lask may refer to:

== People ==
- Emil Lask, (1875–1915) German philosopher
- Berta Lask, (1878–1967) German writer
- Louis Jacobsohn-Lask, (1863–1941) German neurologist and neuroanatomist
- Abraham ben Samuel Cohen of Lask eighteenth century Jewish ascetic
- J. J. Lask, American writer

== Places ==
- Łask, a town in central Poland
  - Gmina Łask, an administrative division based on the town
  - Łask County, a county based on the town
  - Łask railway station, serving the town

== Football teams ==
- ŽFK LASK, Serbian first class women's football team
- LASK, Austrian football club
- LASK Juniors OÖ, (2014–2018) a syndicated football team combining FC Juniors OÖ and the second team of LASK Linz
