= Kiçik Qaramurad =

- Municipality
- Location within Azerbaijan
- Coordinates: 40°33′16″N 45°41′08″E
- Country: Azerbaijan
- Rayon: Gadabay

Population
  - Total: 1,466
- Time zone: UTC+4 (AZT)
  - Summer (DST): UTC+5 (AZT)

Kiçik Qaramurad (also, Kichik Karamurad) is a village and municipality in the Gadabay Rayon of Azerbaijan. It has a population of 1,466. The municipality consists of the villages of Kiçik Qaramurad and Leşkər.
