= 2016 Polish People's Party leadership election =

Polish election 2016

- 19 November 2016
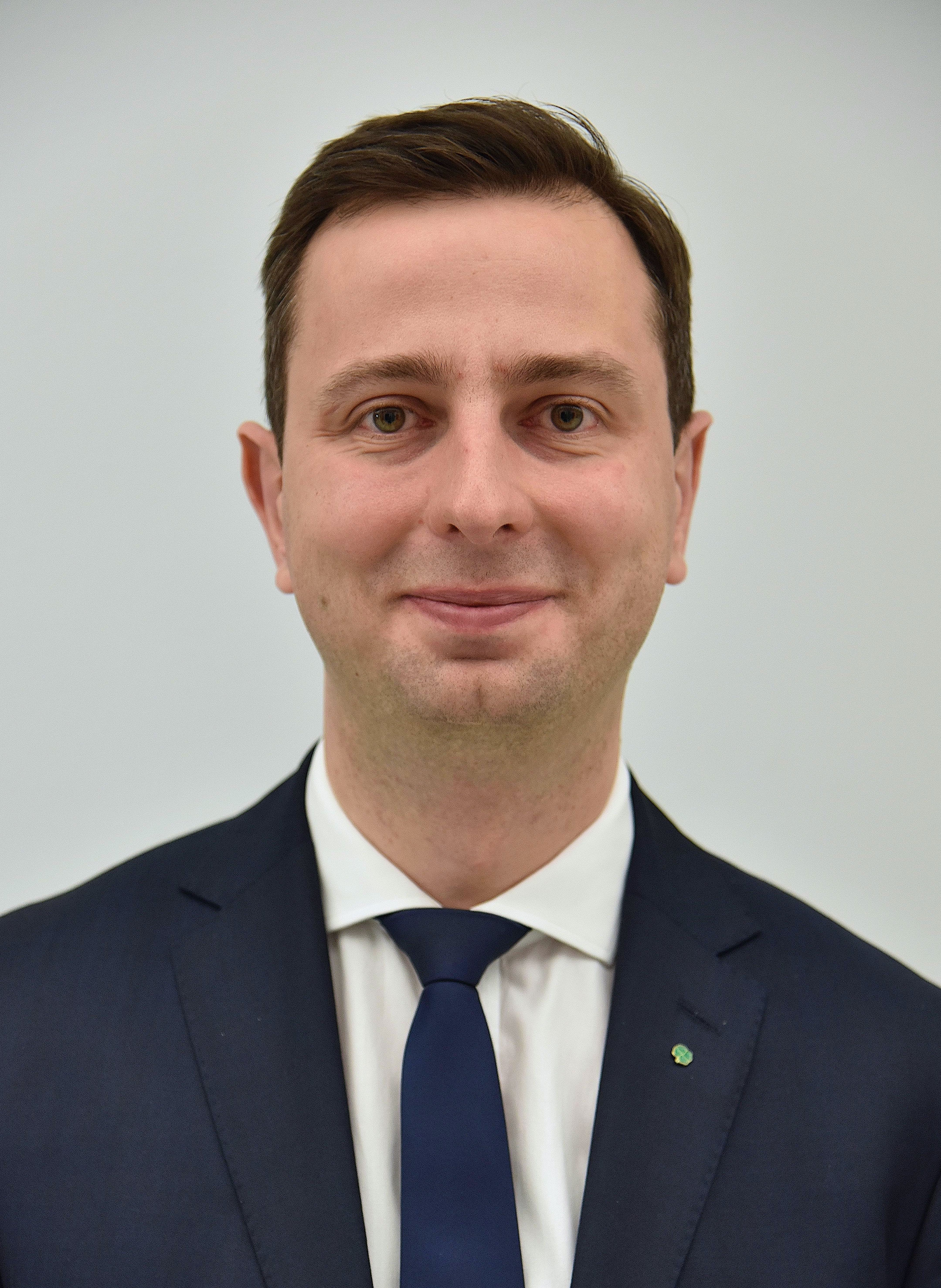

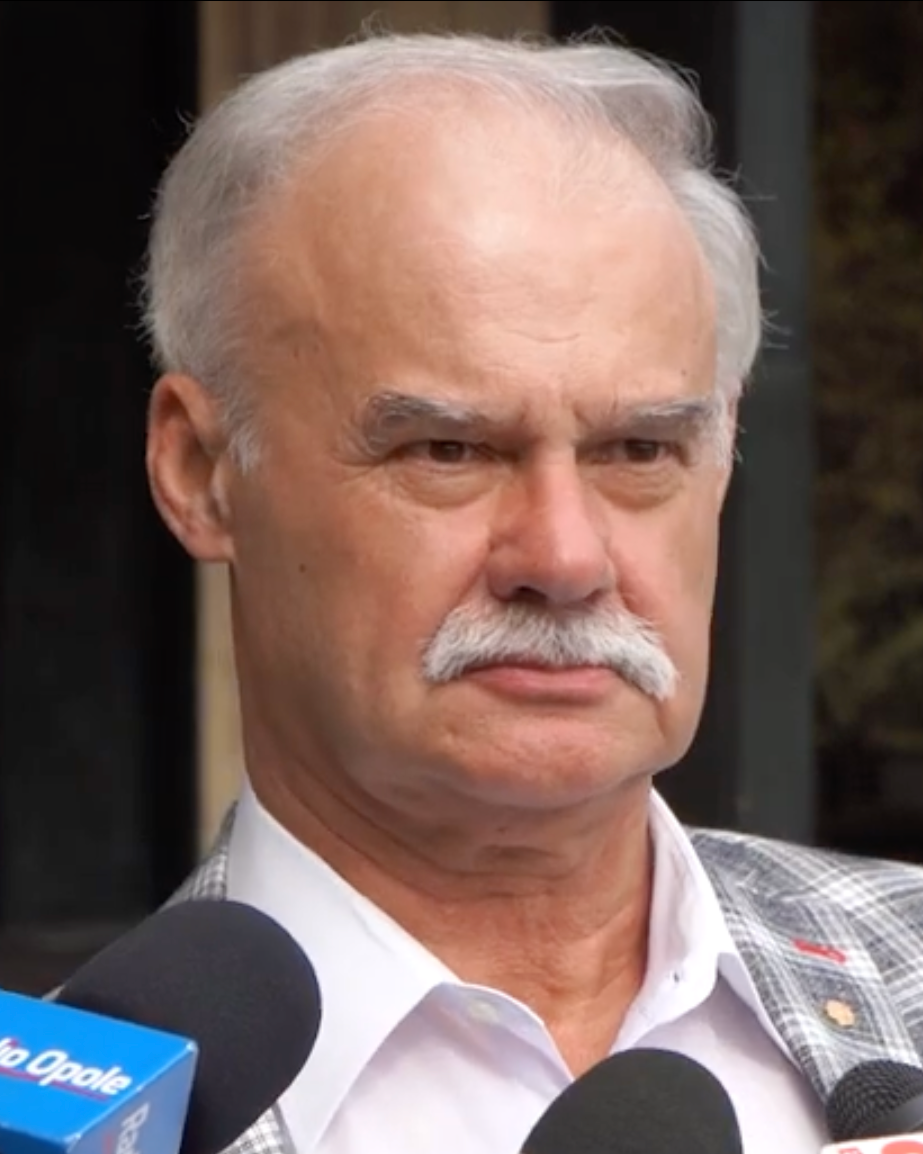
| Candidate | Władysław Kosiniak-Kamysz | Stanisław Rakoczy |
| Popular vote | 1002 | 50 |
| Percentage | 95.25% | 4.75% |
Chairman before election
Władysław Kosiniak-Kamysz
Elected Chairman
Władysław Kosiniak-Kamysz

The 2016 Polish People's Party leadership election was held on 19 November 2016 at the 12th Polish People's Party Congress in Jachranka. Incumbent leader Władysław Kosiniak-Kamysz was re-elected to the position in a landslide victory. He defeated Stanisław Rakoczy for the position.

== Election ==
The election was held on 19 November 2016 at the 12th Polish People's Party Congress in Jachranka. Incumbent chairman Władysław Kosiniak-Kamysz was re-elected with 95% of the vote, defeating Stanisław Rakoczy. Jarosław Kalinowski was elected Head of the Supreme Council, defeating the chairman of the party's youth wing, Tomasz Pilawka, with 77% of the vote.

== Results ==
=== Party chairman ===
| Candidate | Vote | % |
|---|---|---|
| Władysław Kosiniak-Kamysz ✓ | 1002 | 95.25 |
| Stanisław Rakoczy | 50 | 4.75 |
| Total votes | 1052 | 100.00 |
Source: Polish Press Agency

=== Head of the Supreme Council ===
| Candidate | Vote | % |
|---|---|---|
| Jarosław Kalinowski ✓ | 713 | 77.25 |
| Tomasz Pilawka | 210 | 22.75 |
| Total votes | 923 | 100.00 |
Source: Polish Press Agency
