= Georg Bleibtreu =

German painter (1828–1892)

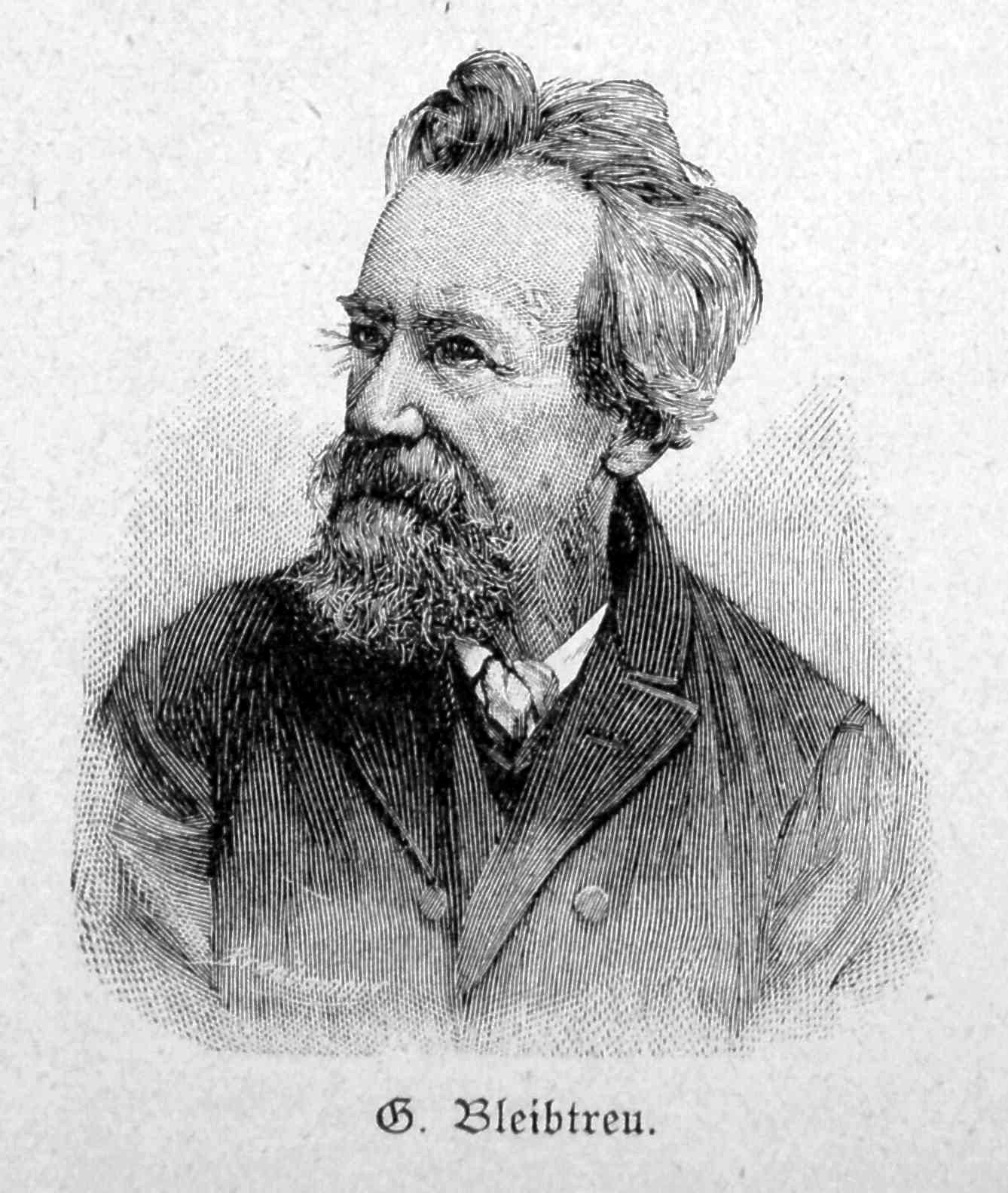
Georg Bleibtreu

Georg Bleibtreu (27 March 1828 – 16 October 1892) was a German painter of military and historical scenes.

== Biography ==
Born in Xanten on 27 March 1828, Bleibtreu was a painter, lithographer, designer and 'graveur sur bois'. He was a member of the Berlin Academy, receiving two gold medals for his works; he also received a medal at Vienna in 1873. Like many history painters of the 19th century, he studied at the Düsseldorf Academy between 1843 and 1848, and also with the historical and military painter, Theodore Hildebrandt. He is associated with the Düsseldorf school of painting. In 1858 he moved to Berlin.

His reputation was built on large canvasses depicting the Prussian and German armies in battle, and he painted numerous scenes of the Schleswig-Holstein War of 1864, the Austro-Prussian War of 1866, and the Franco-Prussian War. The background work to these paintings was done in the field as the artist accompanied the armies; in 1866, he traveled in the suite of Prince Frederick Charles until August when he returned to Berlin with a portfolio of sketches taken at the front. In 1870, he accompanied the Crown Prince. Following the successful war against Denmark, the Prussian king invited artists in December 1864 to compete for a prize of 10,000 thaler by painting a large canvas representing the victory at Düppel, the winning piece to by sent to the National Gallery in Berlin. One of the requirements was that artists had to be familiar with the subject and had experienced the war. Bleibtreu's piece was bought by the king in 1865, and the latter also commissioned the artist to paint the Crossing of the Alsen.

Bleibtreu's Battle of Königgrätz, oil on canvas, 1866, Deutsches Historisches Museum in Berlin

His painting of the Battle of Königgrätz depicted King William on a black horse with his suite, Bismarck, Moltke, Roon, and others, watching the battle; in the foreground is a detachment of captured Austrians. This style pervaded many of Bleibtreu's works where the focus was on the commander, who was often a member of the German royal family, surrounded by his soldiers in battle; this was often because the painting was a commission from the personage depicted.

Shortly after the end of the war with France, he set up a studio in a quiet wing of the Palace of Versailles to commence work on two paintings, one representing the Crown Prince of Prussia at Wörth, and the other, King William at Battle of Sedan. In 1876, he exhibited two Franco-Prussian war scenes at the Royal Academy in Berlin.

Bleibtreu died at Charlottenbourg on 16 October 1892. His work is rarely seen today, and some of his paintings were destroyed in World War II, although pictures of his works can be seen in histories of the various German wars, and regimental histories. He was the father of the literary critic Karl Bleibtreu.

== Paintings ==
- Battle of Kolding (1852)
- Destruction of the Kiel Turner-Corps at Flensburg (1852)
- Battles of Grossbeeren on the Katzbach (1857)
- Battle of Aspern
- Duke Ferdinand of Brunswick in Battle of Crefeld (1858)
- Episode from Battle of Waterloo (1858)
- Skirmishes on Königshugel at Oeversee
- Soldiers crossing to Alsen in 1864
- Battle of Königgrätz
- Charge of the 12th Thuringian Hussars at Rosberitz during the Battle of Königgrätz
- The Emperor at the battle of Vionville
- At the Loigny, December 2, 1870
- The Meeting of Von Moltke and Wimpfen the Evening before Sedan
- Surrender of Napoleon after Sedan
- The Bavarians before Paris
- King William near a battery before Paris
- Crown Prince Albert of Saxony at the Battle of Gravelotte, August 18, 1870
- King William after Battle of Gravelotte
- Napoleon's flight after Battle of Waterloo (1878)
- Attack of Saxon Corps at St. Privat (1880)
- Storming of Fröschweiler by the Würtemberg Troops (1880)
- The Summons in 1813 (1881)
- York at Wartenburg, 1813

== See also ==
- List of German painters
