= Maków Mazowiecki =

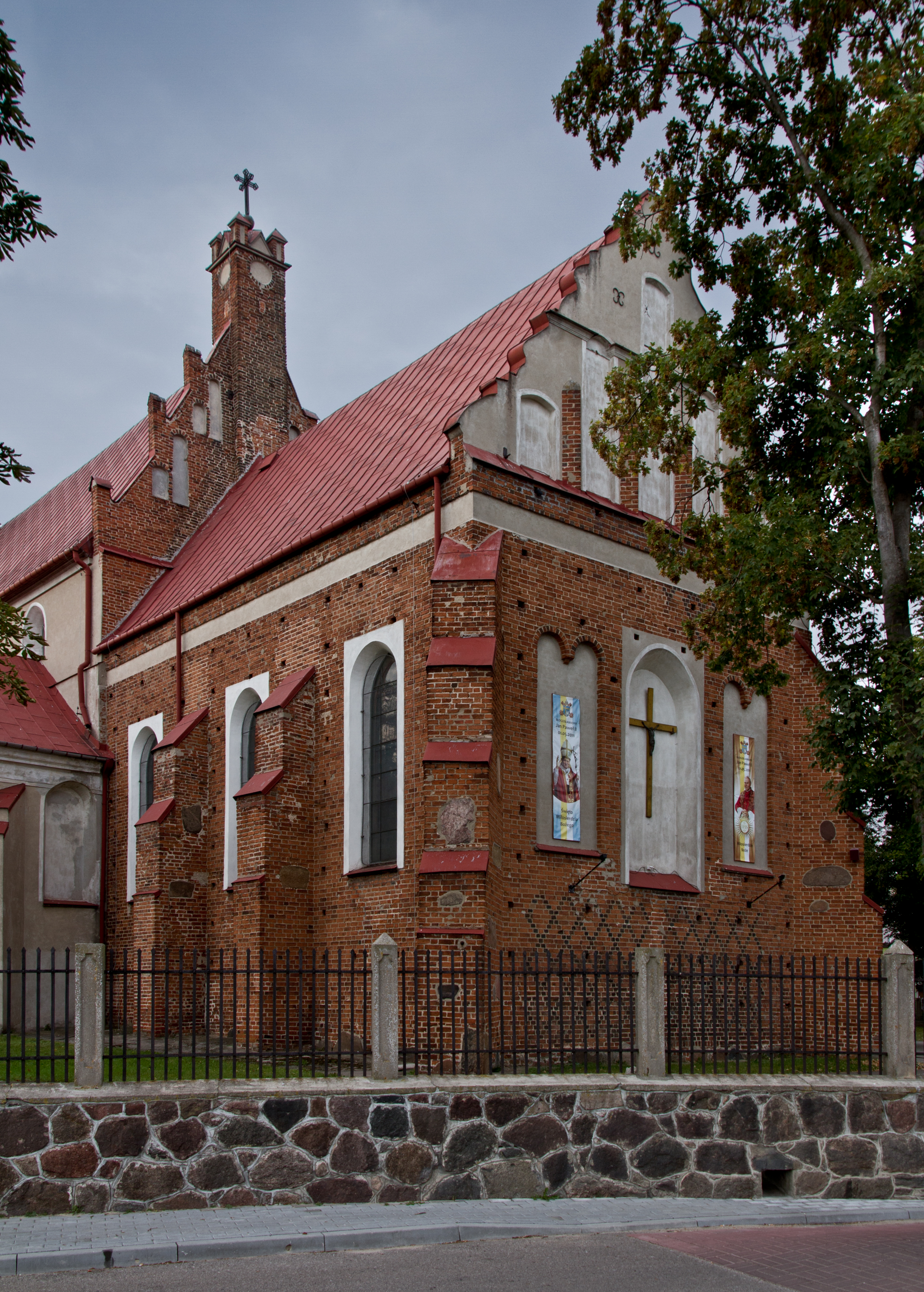
- Corpus Christi church in Maków Mazowiecki

- Coat of arms

- Location within Poland
- Coordinates: 52°52′N 21°6′E
- Country: Poland
- Voivodeship: Masovian
- County: Maków
- Gmina: Maków Mazowiecki (urban gmina)
- Town rights: 1421

Government
  - Mayor: Tadeusz Ciak

Area
  - Total: 10.3 km^{2} (4.0 sq mi)

Population (2011)
  - Total: 10,262
  - Density: 996/km^{2} (2,580/sq mi)
- Time zone: UTC+1 (CET)
  - Summer (DST): UTC+2 (CEST)
- Postal code: 06-200
- Area code: +48 29
- Vehicle registration: WMA
- Website: www.makowmazowiecki.pl

Maków Mazowiecki ([ˈmakuf mazɔˈvʲɛt͡skʲi]; Yiddish: מאקאוו, romanized: Makov; German: Makow, 1941–1945 Mackeim) is a town in Poland, in the Masovian Voivodship. It is the powiat capital of Maków County. Its population is 10,850.

== History ==
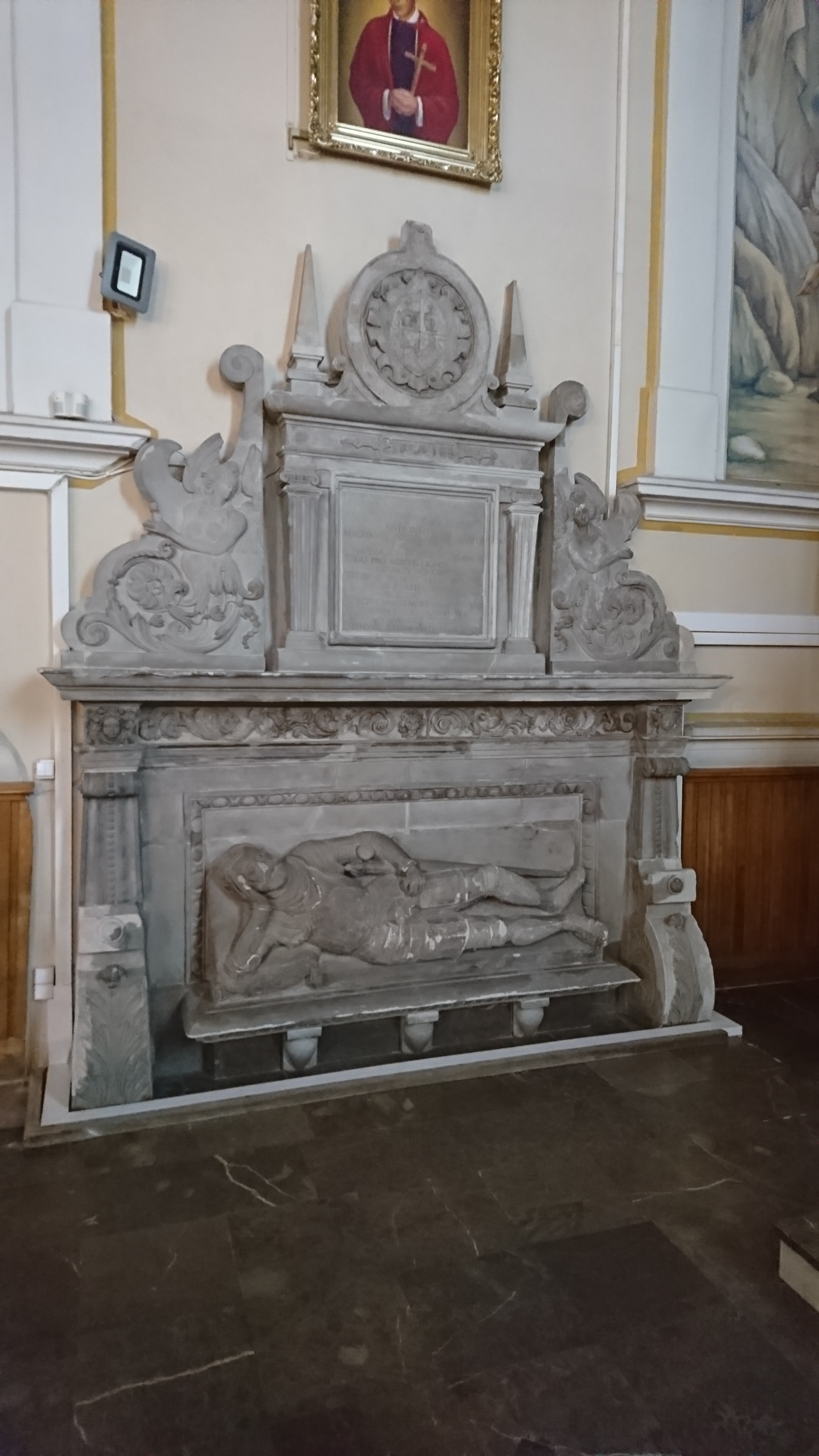
Renaissance tombstone of Jędrzej Noskowski, starost of Maków, in the Corpus Christi church

The town obtained its town charter in 1421. It was a county seat and royal town of the Kingdom of Poland, administratively located in the Masovian Voivodeship in the Greater Poland Province.

A battle was fought nearby on August 19, 1920, during the Polish-Soviet War. Before 1939 about 7,000 people lived in Maków, including 4,000 Poles and 3,000 Jews.

=== World War II ===
During the German invasion of Poland, which started World War II, the Einsatzgruppe V entered the town on September 10–11, 1939, commit atrocities against the population. The Einsatzgruppe V immediately carried out searches of Polish offices and organizations. Medicines from pharmacies and local supplies of grain, sugar and rice were confiscated for the German Army. Under German occupation the name was Germanized to Mackeim. In Maków, the German occupying administration operated a concentration camp for ill and disabled people from the region. In February 1940, the Germans murdered 560 people from the camp in a forest near Wyszogród, while 50 people from the local hospital were murdered in the nearby village of Grzanka.

The Jewish community was murdered by Nazi Germany in the Holocaust. Some killings were done in the town; thousands of Maków Mazowiecki Jews were murdered at the Auschwitz concentration camp. The Germans also operated a forced labour camp for Poles and Jews in the town from 1940 to 1944. Many prisoners died to typhus and cholera. After the camp's dissolution, the surviving prisoners were sent to camps in Działdowo and Gdańsk.

The Germans occupied Maków Mazowiecki until April 1945. In January 1945, heavy fighting and artillery barrages destroyed 90% of the town's buildings.

== Demographics ==
Historical population

Year	Pop.	±%
1890	6,438	—
1897	7,206	+11.9%
1910	7,161	−0.6%
1921	6,198	−13.4%

Year	Pop.	±%
1931	6,645	+7.2%
1950	3,270	−50.8%
1960	4,785	+46.3%
2010	9,755	+103.9%

== Notable people ==
- David Azrieli - Canadian businessman and philanthropist
- Kamil Majkowski - Polish football player
- Hyman G. Rickover - admiral in the US Navy, born in Maków in 1900. His leadership in the nuclear propulsion and power generation was instrumental in developing a culture where safety was paramount.
- Leib Langfus - Rabbi from Makow, later murdered in Auschwitz-Birkenau. His diary of his deportation and time in Auschwitz-Birkenau are considered one of the most valuable Holocaust era eyewitness testimonies.
- Mordechai Ciechanower (1924-2025) - Holocaust survivor (Auschwitz, Stutthof, and other camps), public speaker and author. He dedicated the latter part of his life to Holocaust education through writing, accompanying Israeli high school students and soldiers to Holocaust sites in Poland, and giving testimony through public speaking. His autobiography, "A Star Gleams in the Distance,” was published in Hebrew, English, German and Polish. In 2014, he was the subject of a film titled, “Der Dachdecker von Birkenau (“The Roofer of Birkenau”). Ciechanower also helped the Polish underground while in Auschwitz. After his liberation, he disguised himself as a member of the British Army’s Jewish Brigade and made his way to Palestine where he fought in Israel’s War of Independence.
