= Lowland (disambiguation) =

A lowland is portion of a plain that has a low elevation.

Lowland, Lowlands, or The Lowlands may refer also to:

== Places ==
=== Europe ===
- Scottish Lowlands, a cultural and historic region of Scotland
  - Central Lowlands, a geographic subdivision of Scotland
- North European Plain, also Northern European Lowlands, a region of Europe between the Central Highlands and the North Sea
  - Low Countries, the part that lies in the Netherlands, Belgium and (by extension) Luxembourg
  - Silesian Lowlands, the part that lies in Poland
- Meshchera Lowlands, of Western Russia
- Samogitia, one of the five ethnographic regions of Lithuania
- Central Swedish lowland

=== North America ===
- Arctic Lowlands, of Northern Canada
- Caribbean Lowlands, the low-lying eastern side of Mesoamerican countries
- Eastern Ridges and Lowlands, a region of Eastern Wisconsin
- Hudson Bay Lowlands, also of Northern Canada
- Lowland, North Carolina, a community in Pamlico County, North Carolina
- Rasmussen Lowlands, a region of Northern Canada
- Saint Lawrence Lowlands, a region of North American containing the Great Lakes

=== Other ===
- Lowlands, Western Australia, a locality of Albany

== Music ==
- Lowlands (festival), annual Dutch music festival
- Lowlands (album), a 2000 album by Susan McKeown
- Lowlands of Holland, Scottish folk song

== Other ==
- Lowlands (1922 film), a German silent film
- Tiefland (film) (Lowlands), a 1954 film directed by Leni Riefenstahl
- Tiefland (opera) (Lowlands), a 1903 opera composed by Eugen d'Albert
- SS Lowland, a British cargo ship in service 1947–59
- The Lowland, a 2013 novel by Jhumpa Lahiri
- Low-lands, a short story by Thomas Pynchon printed in New World Writing and reprinted in Pynchon's collection Slow Learner

== See also ==
- Lowlander (disambiguation)
