= Terra baixa =

Play by Ángel Guimerá

Sixth edition of Terra baixa.

Terra baixa (Catalan pronunciation: [ˈtɛrə ˈβaʃə], meaning in English Lowlands, also known as Martha of the Lowlands) is a Catalan-language play written by Àngel Guimerà in 1896. The drama is considered his most popular work, having become an international sensation after its premiere.

It served as the basis for three operas, among them Tiefland, by Eugen d'Albert, which in turn served as the basis for two films, including one by Leni Riefenstahl. Six other films based directly on the play were also made.

== Plot ==
Terra baixa is the story of Marta, a poor girl from Barcelona, who finds herself the young lover to Sebastià, the most important landowner in the Catalan lowlands. Sebastià must marry a woman of prominence to keep his land and inheritance. To squelch gossip of his relationship with Marta but still keep her as his lover, Sebastià marries her off to the unsuspecting Manelic, a young shepherd from the Pyrenees, and sets the newlyweds up in the house attached to the town's mill. Marta is ashamed of having a lover before marriage and is at first cold to her new caring husband, who she thinks agreed to marry her like this. The townspeople gossip and laugh at them. Manelic confronts Marta, who tells Manelic the truth, and expects (and wants) him to kill her. Manelic forgives his wife and takes revenge on Sebastià.

== Filmography ==
- Terra baixa, directed by Fructuós Gelabert and Narciso Cuyàs (Spain, 1907)
- Feudalismo, directed by Alfredo Robert (Italy, 1912)
- Tierra baja, directed by Mario Gallo (Argentina, 1912)
- Marta of the Lowlands, directed by J. Searle Dawley (1914)
- Tiefland, directed by Friedrich Rosenthal and Hans Rhoden (Austria, 1918, based on the opera Tiefland)
- Under the Mountains, directed by Béla Balogh (Hungary, 1920, based on the opera Tiefland)
- Lowlands, directed by Adolf E. Licho (Germany, 1922, based on the opera Tiefland)
- Tierra baja, directed by Miguel Zacarías (Mexico, 1951)
- Tiefland, directed by Leni Riefenstahl (Germany, 1940–54, based on the opera Tiefland)
- Tiefland, directed by Werner Kelch (West Germany, 1964, TV film, based on the opera Tiefland)
- Tierra Baja, directed by Cayetano Luca de Tena (Spain, 1971, TV film)
- Terra baixa, directed by Mercè Vilaret i Llop (Spain, 1982, video)
- Terra baixa, directed by Josep Montanyès (Spain, 1991, TV film)
- Terra baixa, directed by Isidro Ortiz (Spain, 2011)
