= Dennis Rasmussen =

Dennis Rasmussen may refer to:

- Dennis Rasmussen (baseball) (born 1959), an American former MLB player
- Dennis Rasmussen (ice hockey) (born 1990), Swedish NHL player
- Dennis C. Rasmussen (born 1978), American political scientist and author
- Dennis F. Rasmussen (born 1947), American politician

== See also ==
- Rasmussen (disambiguation)
