= Lowlands (1922 film) =

1922 film

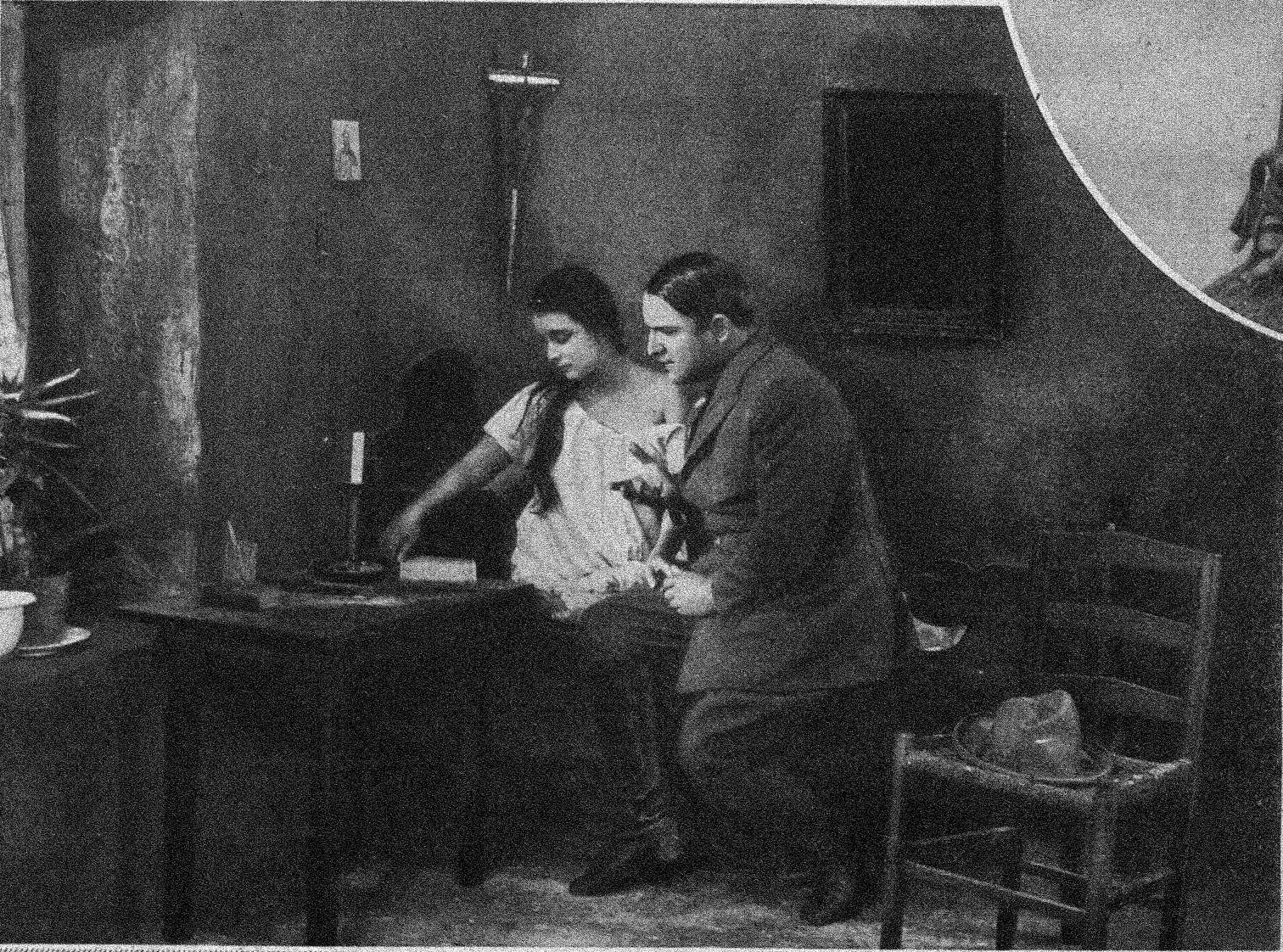
- Lil Dagover and Michael Bohnen
- Directed by: Adolf E. Licho
- Written by: Rudolph Lothar (libretto); Àngel Guimerà (play)
- Produced by: Erich Pommer
- Starring: Lil Dagover
- Cinematography: Curt Courant; Karl Freund; Karl Hasselmann; Friedrich Weinmann
- Music by: Eugen D'Albert
- Production company: Decla-Bioscop
- Distributed by: UFA
- Release date: 1 December 1922
- Running time: 67 minutes
- Country: Germany
- Languages: Silent; German intertitles

Lowlands (German: Tiefland) is a 1922 German silent film directed by Adolf E. Licho and starring Lil Dagover, based on the 1903 opera Tiefland. The story was later turned into a sound film Lowlands directed by and starring Leni Riefenstahl.

== Cast ==
In alphabetical order

- Juan Andrea as Enrico
- Martha Angerstein-Licho as Maria, Enrico's Tochter
- Michael Bohnen as Sebastionos
- Lil Dagover as Martha
- Cecilie Denyse as Schwester Isabella
- Ilka Grüning as Die Duenna
- Paul Hansen as Pedro
- Fritz Kampers as Der Müllerbursche
- Ida Perry as Estrella
- Hans Sternberg as Pfarrer

== Bibliography ==
- Fawkes, Richard (2000). Opera on Film. London: Duckworth. ISBN 978-0-7156-2943-7.
