= Under the Mountains =

1920 film

- Directed by: Béla Balogh
- Written by: József Pakots
- Based on: Tiefland by: Eugen d'Albert; Rudolph Lothar; (that is based in Terra Baixa)
- Starring: Oszkár Dénes; Ila Lóth; László Mihó
- Cinematography: Dezsö Nagy
- Production company: Star Filmgyár
- Release date: 7 July 1920
- Country: Hungary
- Languages: Silent; Hungarian intertitles

Under the Mountains (1920)

Under the Mountains (Hungarian: Hegyek alján) is a 1920 Hungarian silent drama film directed by Béla Balogh and starring Oszkár Dénes, Ila Lóth and László Mihó.

== Cast ==
- Oszkár Dénes as Sebastiano, földbirtokos
- Ila Lóth as Marta, molnárlány
- László Mihó as Maruccio, molnárinas
- Iván Petrovich as Pedro, a pásztor
- Magda Posner as Lujza
- Soma Szarvasi as Tomasso apó
- Leóna Szarvasiné

== Bibliography ==
- Cunningham, John. Hungarian Cinema: From Coffee House to Multiplex. Wallflower Press, 2004.
