= Gertrud Bodenwieser =

Austrian-Australian dancer, choreographer, and dance teacher (1890–1959)

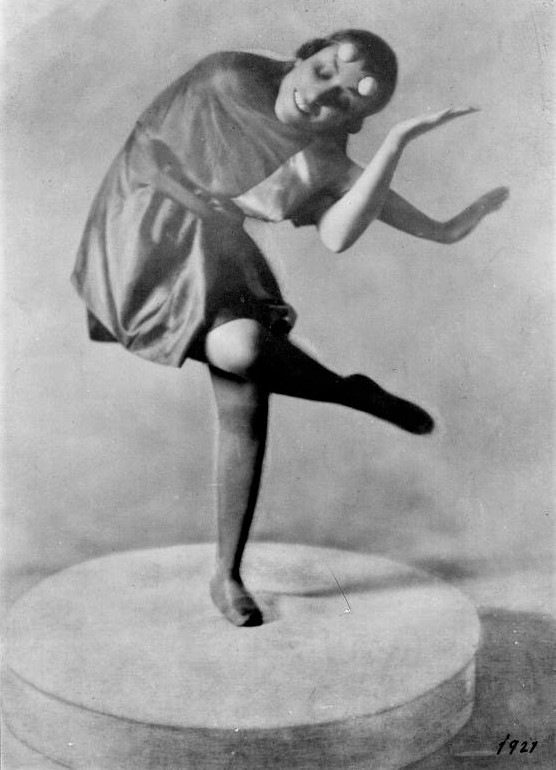
- Born: Gertrud Bondi; 3 February 1890; Vienna, Austria-Hungary
- Died: 10 November 1959 (aged 69); Sydney, Australia
- Known for: Dance, choreography and teaching
- Movement: Expressionism, modern dance, classical ballet
- Spouse: Friedrich Rosenthal

Gertrud Bodenwieser (3 February 1890 – 10 November 1959), also known as "Gertrude", was an Austrian-Australian dancer, choreographer, dance teacher, and pioneer of expressive dance.

== Early life ==
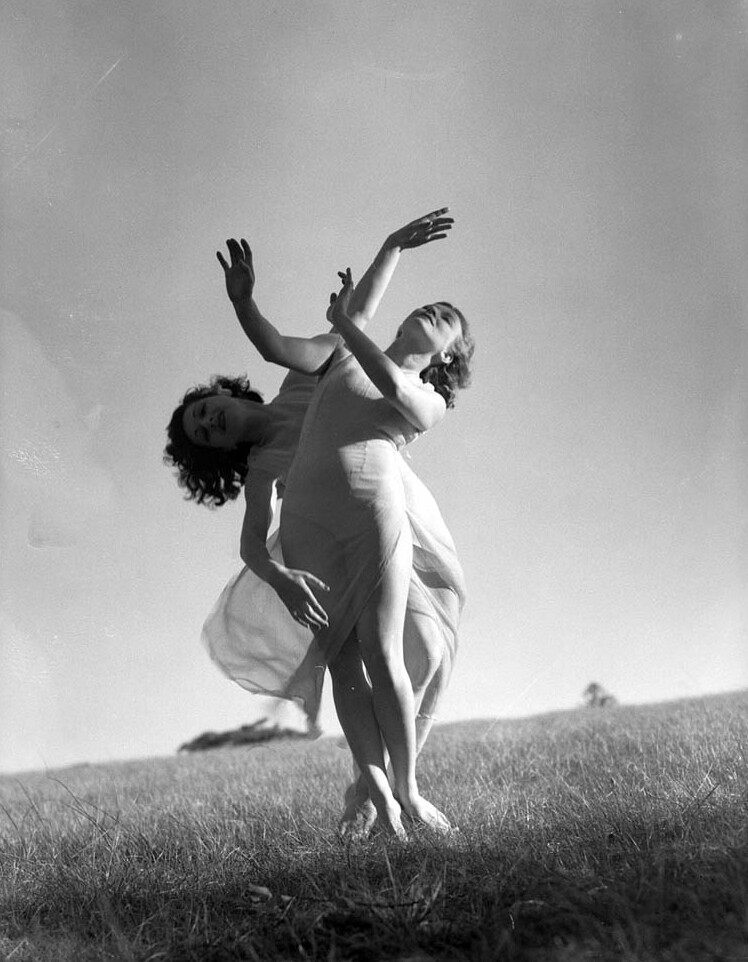
Emmy Towsey (Taussig) and Evelyn Ippen, Bodenwieser Ballet in Centennial Park in Sydney, Australia c. 1939.

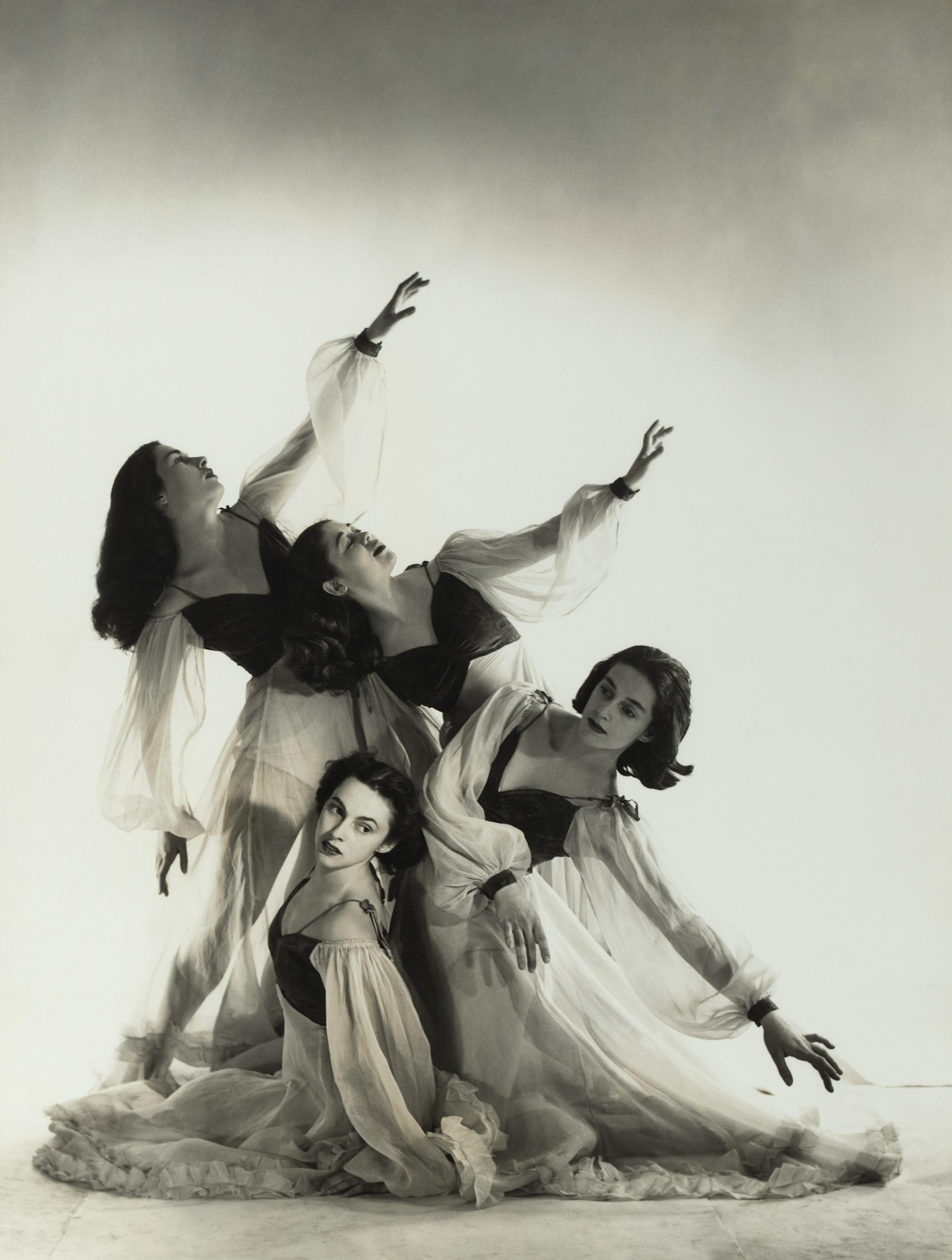
Bodenwieser Ballet performance of Blue Danube Waltz, with Moira Claux, Elaine Vallance, Nina Bascolo and Biruta Apens, 1953

The daughter of Theodore and Maria Bondi, a wealthy Jewish couple, she turned to dance under the pseudonym Gertrud Bodenwieser under which she was celebrated in Vienna as a sensation. Bodenwieser's style was based on classical ballet of which she was originally taught by Carl Godlewski from 1905 to 1910; she had a new style of dance that was welcomed by the audience, critics and young students with much enthusiasm. She was inspired by the works of Isadora Duncan and Ruth St. Denis. One of her greatest successes was "Demon Machine", a dance performance, in which a group of dancers turned into machines.

== Career ==
Bodenwieser was appointed professor of dance at the University of Music and Performing Arts, Vienna. In the concert hall's basement she ran her own dance studio. Her pupils went out on tours throughout Europe as Tanzgruppe Bodenwieser ("Bodenwieser dance group"). Among her students who went on to pursue their own careers were names such as Vilma Degischer, Trudl Dubsky, Shona Dunlop MacTavish, Gisa Geert, Hilde Holger, Susanne Hock, Gertrud Kraus, Maria Palmer, Peggy van Praagh, and Cilli Wang.

Bodenwieser and many of her dancers were Jewish and in 1938, when the Nazis invaded Austria, the ballet was forced to leave Europe. Bodenwieser fled with a handful of students to Colombia, where she gave a guest performance as part of the 400 year celebration of Bogotá. She was even able to fill a bullfighting arena with enthusiastic spectators. Her 1944 dance, "The Masks of Lucifer", showed intrigue, terror and hatred as personifications of political totalitarianism and became famous as the embodiment of an ominous time.

Emigration led Bodenwieser to Australia where she lived the rest of her life. In Sydney, she taught dance and founded the Bodenwieser Ballet (1939–1959), which was described as "the first truly influential modern dance company in Australia". Bodenwieser's teaching produced some of the most important dancers, choreographers, and artists in Australia, including Anita Ardell, Keith Bain, Margaret Chapple, Coralie Hinkley, Ena Noël, Ann Butt, Hanny Exiner, Phillipa Cullen and Eileen Kramer. One student from the days of Vienna, Dunlop MacTavish, continued to dance with the company and also taught ballet in local Sydney schools, including Abottsleigh Girls' School. The company toured both urban and rural Australia, and also toured France, New Zealand (1950), South Africa (1950) and India (1952), before folding with the death of its founder.

== Archive ==
Emmy Towsey and Marie Cuckson collated the "Bodenwiser Archives" from salvaged and catalogued materials, with the intention to donate them to the National Library of Australia.

== Personal life ==
Bodenwieser was married in 1920 to the Viennese director and playwright Friedrich Rosenthal, who died in 1942 in the Auschwitz concentration camp. She died suddenly on 10 November 1959.

== Literature ==
- Cuckson, Marie: Gertrud Bodenwieser. Her Contribution to the Art of the Dance. Vaucluse, NSW 1960.
- Dunlop MacTavish, Shona: An Ecstasy of Purpose. The Life and Art of Gertrud Bodenwieser. Dunedin, N.Z. 1987.
- Grayburn, Patricia (ed.): Gertrud Bodenwieser, 1890–1959. A celebratory monograph on the 100th anniversary of her birth, with a catalogue of the exhibition shown at the University of Surrey (...) and the Royal Festival Hall (...). Surrey 1990.
- Dunlop MacTavish, Shona: Gertrud Bodenwieser. Tänzerin, Choreographin, Pädagogin. Wien – Sydney. (Gekürzte Ausgabe, aus dem Englischen übersetzt von Gabriele Haefs, hrsg.v. Denny Hirschbach). Zeichen und Spuren, Bremen 1992. ISBN 3-924588-21-X.
- Vernon-Warren, Bettina and Charles Warren (ed.): Gertrud Bodenwieser and Vienna's Contribution to Ausdruckstanz. Harwood Academic Publishers, Amsterdam u.a. 1999. ISBN 90-5755-035-0.
- Amort, Andrea: Free Dance in Interwar Vienna. In: Interwar Vienna. Culture between Tradition and Modernity. Eds. Deborah Holmes and Lisa Silverman. New York, Camden House, 2009, p. 117–142. ISBN 978-1-57113-420-2

== Sources ==
- Biography at www.australiadancing.org (accessed 8 November 2008)
- Siglinde Kaiser-Bolbecher: Österreichische Emigration in Kolumbien at www.literaturepochen.at (accessed on 9 November 2008, German)
- Cuckson, Marie; Reitterer, H. (1993). "Bodenwieser, Gertrud (1890–1959)". Australian Dictionary of Biography. Vol. 13. National Centre of Biography, Australian National University. ISBN 978-0-522-84459-7. ISSN 1833-7538. OCLC 70677943.
