= Rudolf Lothar =

Austrian writer (1865–1943)

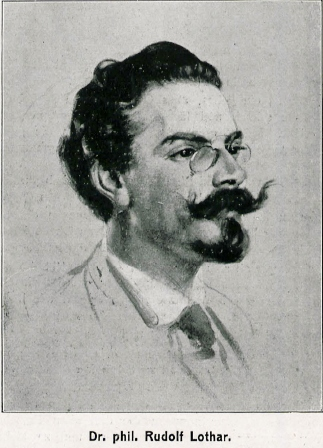
Rudolf Lothar

Rudolf Lothar German pronunciation: [r'uːdolf l'oːtar] (born Rudolf Lothar Spitzer; 25 February 1865 – 2 October 1943) was an Austrian playwright, librettist, critic and essayist. He was born and died in Budapest.

== Literary works ==
- 1891 Der verschleierte König, drama
- 1900 König Harlekin, play, translated into 14 languages
- 1900 Das Wiener Burgtheater
- 1904 Tiefland, opera libretto set to music by Eugen d'Albert, based on the 1896 Catalan play Terra baixa by Àngel Guimerà
- 1910 Kurfürstendamm, novel
- 1910 Die drei Grazien, comedy
- 1910 Der Herr von Berlin, novel
- 1912 Die verschenkte Frau, opera libretto set to music by Eugen d'Albert
- 1912 Liebesketten, opera libretto set to music by Eugen d'Albert based on Àngel Guimerà’s Filla del mar
- 1916 Die Seele Spaniens
- 1920 Casanovas Sohn, comedy
- 1920 Li-Tai-Pe, Des Kaisers Dichter, opera libretto set to music by Clemens von Franckenstein
- 1921 Der Werwolf, comedy
- 1925 Die Kunst des Verführens
- 1927 Der gute Europäer, comedy
- 1927 Die Republik befiehlt, comedy
- 1931 Friedemann Bach, opera libretto set to music by Paul Graener based on Albert Emil Brachvogel's novel of the same name
- 1931 Der Papagei, comedy
- 1931 Besuch aus dem Jenseits, drama
- 1934 The Red Cat (German title: Die Nacht vor dem Ultimo), comedy

== Filmography ==
- Tiefland, directed by Friedrich Rosenthal and Hans Rhoden (Silent film, 1918, based on the opera Tiefland)
- Under the Mountains, directed by Béla Balogh (Silent film, 1920, based on the opera Tiefland)
- Lowlands, directed by Adolf E. Licho (Silent film, 1922, based on the opera Tiefland)
- The Masked Dancer, directed by Burton L. King (Silent film, 1924, based on the play Die Frau mit der Maske)
- For Wives Only, directed by Victor Heerman (Silent film, 1926, based on the story The Critical Year)
- The Magic Flame, directed by Henry King (Silent film, 1927, based on the play König Harlekin)
- The Boudoir Diplomat, directed by Malcolm St. Clair (English, 1930, based on the play Die Republik befiehlt)
  - Don Juan diplomático, directed by George Melford (Spanish, 1931, based on the play Die Republik befiehlt)
  - Boudoir diplomatique, directed by Marcel De Sano (French, 1931, based on the play Die Republik befiehlt)
  - Liebe auf Befehl, directed by Johannes Riemann and Ernst L. Frank (German, 1931, based on the play Die Republik befiehlt)
- Folies Bergère de Paris, directed by Roy Del Ruth (English, 1935, based on the play Die Nacht vor dem Ultimo)
  - Folies-Bergère, directed by Roy Del Ruth and Marcel Achard (French, 1935, based on the play Die Nacht vor dem Ultimo)
- Return of a Stranger, directed by Victor Hanbury (English, 1937, based on a play)
- That Night in Rio, directed by Irving Cummings (English, 1941, based on the play Die Nacht vor dem Ultimo)
- Esta é Fina, directed by Luiz de Barros (Portuguese, 1948, based on the play Die Nacht vor dem Ultimo)
- On the Riviera, directed by Walter Lang (English, 1951, based on the play Die Nacht vor dem Ultimo)
- Tiefland, directed by Leni Riefenstahl (German, 1940–54, based on the opera Tiefland)
