= Gertrud Kraus =

Israeli dancer (1901–1977)

Gertrud Kraus גרטרוד קראוס
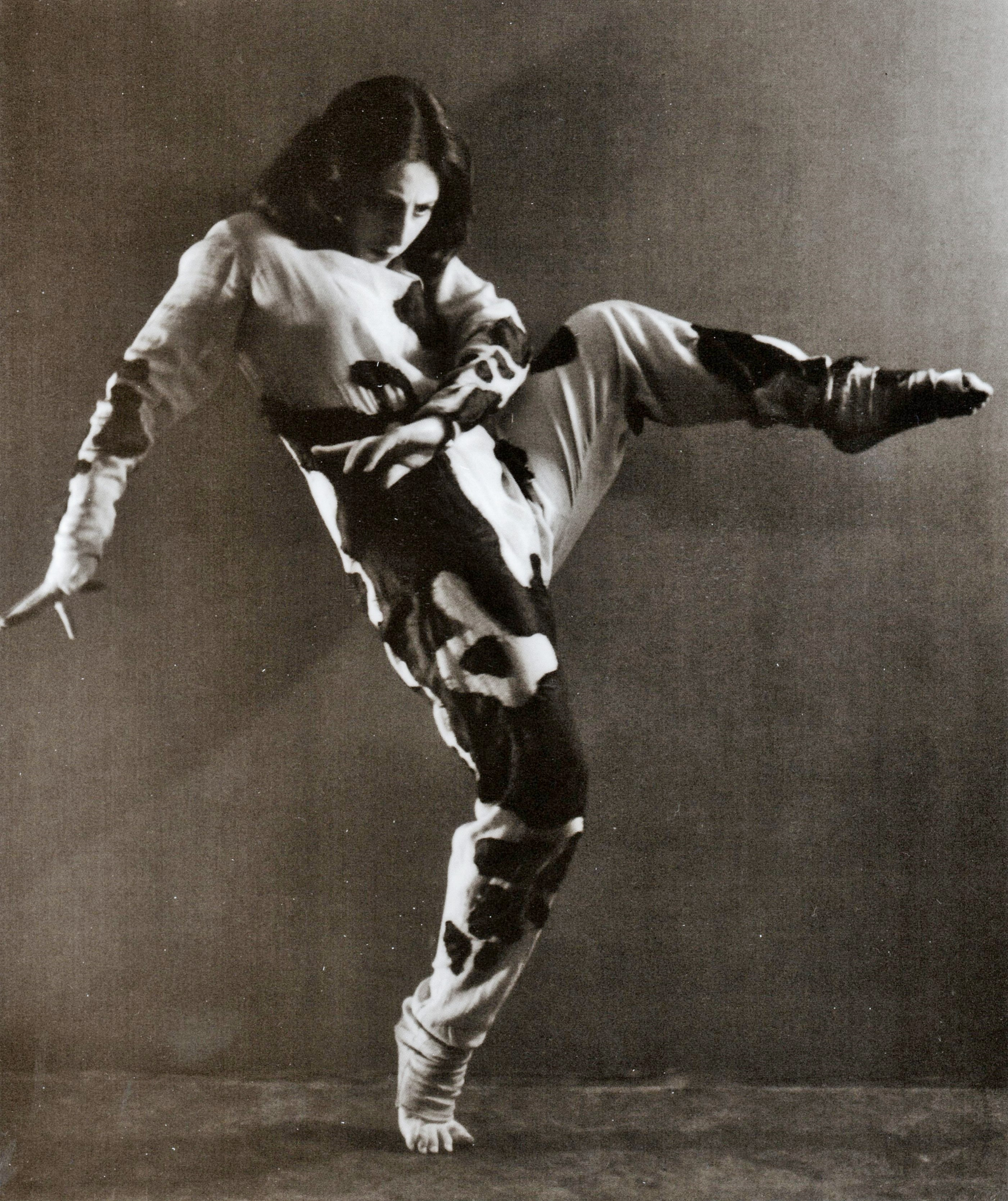
- The Beast, Gertrud Kraus, 1929
- Born: 5 May 1901; Vienna, Austria-Hungary
- Died: 13 November 1977 (age 76)

Gertrud Kraus (Hebrew: גרטרוד קראוס; 5 May 1901 – 13 November 1977) was prominent figure in the development of modern dance in Israel.

== Biography ==
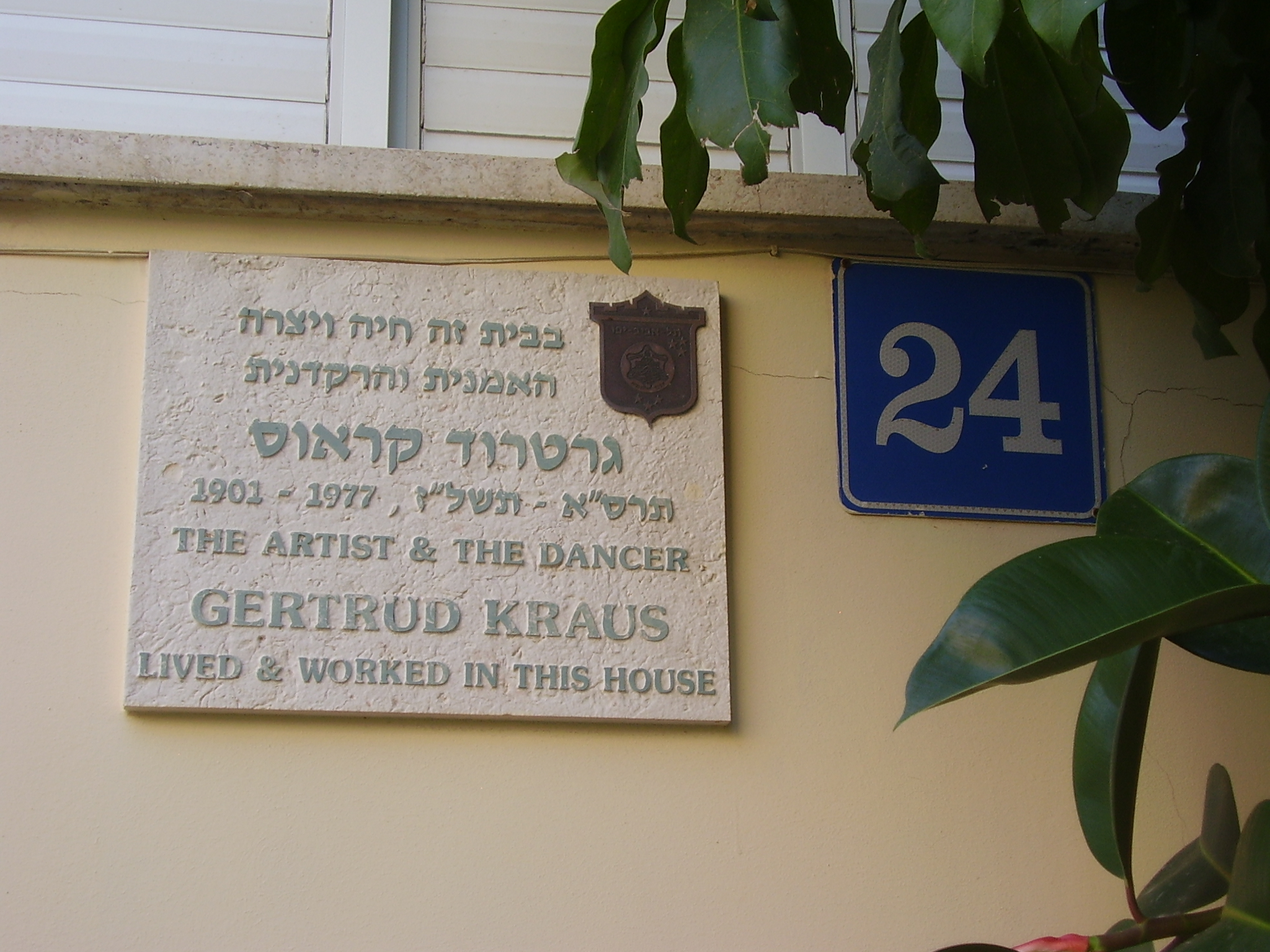
A memorial plaque on her house at 24, Gertrude Kraus Street, Tel Aviv

Gertrud Kraus was born in 1901 in Vienna, Austria-Hungary. Her father, Leopold Kraus, and her mother, Olga (née Neubauer), married in Prague in 1899. They had four children: Robert (1900), Gertrud (1901), Margarethe (1902) and Victor (1903).

Kraus studied piano at the State Academy in Vienna but after graduating decided that what she really loved was dance. She enrolled again at the State Academy, this time in the modern dance department headed by Gertrud Bodenwieser. After graduation, she joined Bodenwieser's dance company.

A few months later, she opened a studio and began rehearsing solos to perform by herself. Her first independent recital took place in a large hall that she hired herself. Friends warned her of the risk involved, but she said: "If it's going to be a flop, at least it will be a spectacular one!"

In the 1920s, Kraus's style was known as expressionist dance, or German dance.

In 1929, Gertrud Kraus, together with Gisa Geert, was chief assistant to Rudolf von Laban, director of a trade union parade during the "Vienna Festival" in Vienna.

In 1930, an impresario invited her to perform in Mandate Palestine. Her tour was a great success and she was invited back the following season. In 1933, her company performed her work Die Stadt wartet ("The City Waits"), presenting the modern metropolis as a fascinating but dangerous place. It was based on a short story by Maxim Gorki. On the night that Adolf Hitler was elected chancellor of Germany, Kraus's company performed this piece on the open-air stage in the palace gardens ('Burggarten') next to the Hofburg in Vienna.

In 1933, while in Prague performing for the Zionist Congress, leaders of a Czech communist cell contacted her and tried to recruit her for their purposes. The next day, she went to the Palestine Office in Prague and applied for immigration.

In 1935, Kraus immigrated to Mandatory Palestine and settled in Tel Aviv first living with friends and then renting a basement that became her studio. She formed a modern dance company affiliated with the Palestine Folk Opera in Tel Aviv, which was probably the only one of its kind in the world. In 1949, she won a scholarship to travel to the United States to get acquainted to the newest trends in modern dance.

In 1950–1951, she founded the Israel Ballet Theatre and became its artistic director. The company folded after a year due to financial difficulties. Until her death in 1977, Kraus devoted herself to teaching dance, as well as painting and sculpture.

== Awards and commemoration ==
In 1968, Kraus was awarded the Israel Prize in dance.

Her legacy is preserved by the "Yad Gertrud Kraus" (Gertrud Kraus House) institution in Ein Hod.
