= The Constitution of the United States: Is It Pro-slavery or Anti-slavery? =

1860 speech by Frederick Douglass

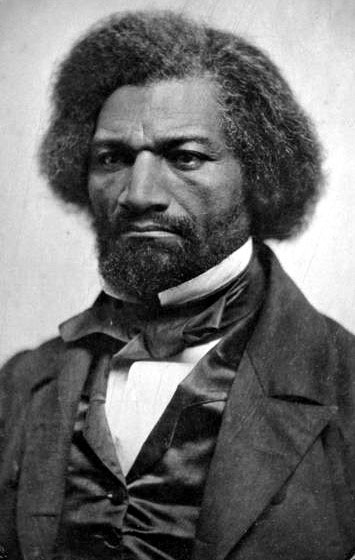
Frederick Douglass in 1856, around 38 years of age

"The Constitution of the United States: Is It Pro-slavery or Anti-slavery?" is a speech that Frederick Douglass gave on March 26, 1860, in Glasgow, in which he rejected arguments made by slaveholders as well as by fellow abolitionists that the United States Constitution is pro-slavery. The popularity of the speech led to its being published as a pamphlet.

== Background ==
Frederick Douglass, born into slavery, escaped and upon meeting Garrisonian abolitionists joined their ranks. Brilliant and capable, Douglass became an active leader and founded The North Star newspaper.

As editor of The North Star, Douglass examined many issues of the day including the text and history of the United States Constitution. Over time, Douglass had a well-publicized break with Garrisonian principles and announced his change of opinion in the North Star with respect to the Constitution as "a pro-slavery document." A decade later, Douglass was accused of having supported John Brown's raid on Harpers Ferry, which prompted him to flee the country. While on a lecture tour in Canada and later Great Britain, Douglass and British Garrisonian abolitionist George Thompson debated the contents and nature of the United States Constitution in front of an interested public. Prior to Douglass's arrival Thompson organized several lectures to denounce Douglass. "But Douglass loved these public squabbles, and his well of resentments and supply of sarcasm against the Garrisonians seemed bottomless".

== Speech ==
Douglass used the allegory of the "man from another country" during the speech, arguing that abolitionists should take a moment to examine the plainly written text of the Constitution instead of secret meanings, saying, "It is not whether slavery existed ... at the time of the adoption of the Constitution" nor that "those slaveholders, in their hearts, intended to secure certain advantages in that instrument for slavery." This was a reference to Roger Taney's view that the Constitution was pro-slavery, which was the view of most lawyers at the time.

Douglass articulated his belief that the "great national enactment done by the people ... can only be altered, amended, or added to by the people," and that the ambiguity of many of its clauses leaned against the flimsy evidence offered by slaveholders.

He argued in the speech for a reform and not a breakup of government, saying, "Do you break up your government? By no means. You say:— Reform the government; and that is just what the abolitionists who wish for liberty in the United States propose." Douglass saw no need to break up the government, because he denied "that the constitution guarantees the right to hold property in man."

During the speech, Douglass examined one by one the four provisions Thompson cited as evidence: the Three-Fifths Clause (Article 1, section 2); the Migration or Importation Clause (Article 1, section 9); the Fugitive Slave Clause (Article 4, section 2); and the clause giving Congress the power to "suppress Insurrections" (Article 1, section 8). In each instance, Douglass took a provision and elaborated a worst-case argument and his own argument. Douglass argued that the Three-Fifths Clause "deprives [slave] States of two-fifths of their natural basis of representation"; that the Migration or Importation Clause allowed Congress to end the importation of slaves from Africa in 1808; that the Fugitive Slave Clause does not apply to slaves but rather to "Person[s] held to Service or Labour", which do not include slaves, because a slave "is a simple article of property. He does not owe and cannot owe service. He cannot even make a contract"; and that the clause giving Congress the power to suppress insurrections gives Congress the power to end slavery, "[i]f it should turn out that slavery is a source of insurrection, [and] that there is no security from insurrection while slavery lasts...." Douglass also examined point by point the meaning of the objects contained in the Preamble, which he listed as "union, defence, welfare, tranquility, justice, and liberty". Douglass concluded that of the six objects slavery "is a foe of them all".

== Historians' reactions ==
The speech has received glowing reviews from historians, who note Douglass's "power of mature reasoning" in this "majestic" speech and his "ingenious textual interpretation of the Constitution".

== Bibliography ==
- Finkelman, Paul (2016). "Frederick Douglass's Constitution: From Garrisonian Abolitionist to Lincoln Republican". Missouri Law Review, vol. 81, no. 1, pp. 1-73.
- Loggins, Vernon (1931). The Negro Author: His Development in America. New York: Columbia University Press. Republished in 1964 as The Negro Author: His Development in America to 1900. Port Washington, N.Y.: Kennikat Press
- Rasmussen, Dennis C. (2026). Frederick Douglass's American Founding: How the Nation's Fiercest Critic Embraced the Constitution. Princeton University Press. Review by David S. Reynolds
- Rebeiro, Bradley (2023). "Frederick Douglass and the Original Originalists". Brigham Young University Law Review, vol. 48
- Rebeiro, Bradley (2026). Until the Last Yoke Is Broken: The Constitutional Vision of Frederick Douglass. Harvard University Press. Review by David S. Reynolds
- Root, Damon. (2020). A Glorious Liberty: Frederick Douglass and the Fight for an Antislavery Constitution. Potomac Books Inc. ISBN 978-1-64012-235-2.

=== Symposium ===
- The subject of the annual Thomas M. Jorde Symposium that was held on November 15, 2022 was "Frederick Douglass and the Two Constitutions, Proslavery and Antislavery". The speakers were David W. Blight, Annette Gordon-Reed, Christopher Tomlins, Martha S. Jones, and James Oakes. Links to their papers are here and a recording of the symposium is available here.
