= Hunold =

Hunold is a surname. Notable people with the surname include:

- Christian Friedrich Hunold (1680-1721), German author
- Erich Hunold (1869-1923), German opera singer
- Rainer Hunold (born 1949), German actor
