= The Daughter of the Hills =

1913 film

- Directed by: J. Searle Dawley
- Written by: J. Searle Dawley
- Produced by: Daniel Frohman
- Starring: Laura Sawyer; Wellington Playter
- Production company: Famous Players Film Company
- Distributed by: State Rights
- Release date: December 20, 1913
- Running time: 4 reels
- Country: USA
- Language: Silent (English intertitles)

The Daughter of the Hills is a 1913 silent historical drama film directed by J. Searle Dawley and starring Laura Sawyer and Wellington Playter. Daniel Frohman and Adolph Zukor produced with distribution through the State Rights system. It was released on December 20, 1913

== Cast ==
- Laura Sawyer as Floria
- Wellington Playter as Serquis
- David Davies as Floria's father
- Frank Van Buren as The Apostle Paul
- P. W. Nares as Nero
- Alexander Gaden as A Slave
- Carmen De Gonzales as Leader of the Dance
- Ben Breakstone as Opposing Gladiator

== Preservation ==
The Daughter of the Hills is currently presumed lost. In February of 2021, the film was cited by the National Film Preservation Board on their Lost U.S. Silent Feature Films list.
