= Cilli Wang =

Austrian-Dutch dancer, performer and theatre maker

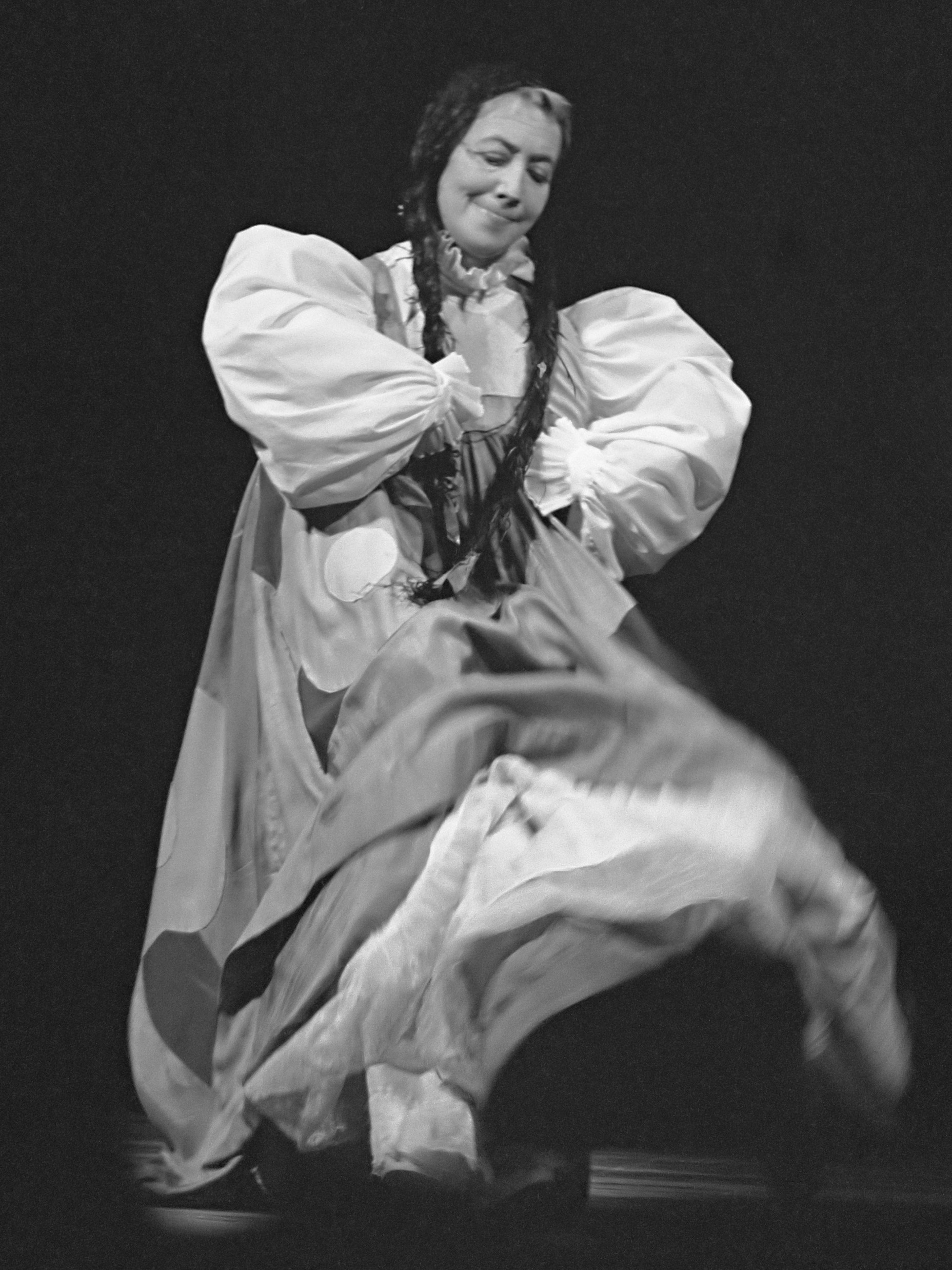
Cilli Wang in 1961

Zäzilie Wang (1 February 1909, Vienna — 10 July 2005, Vienna), stage name Cilli Wang, was an Austrian-born Dutch dancer, performer and theatre maker. Wang initially was known as a dancer and later as a comedienne in Austria and Germany. When Austria merged into the Greater German Reich, she fled to the Netherlands and asked for asylum. After World War II she played in several Dutch cabaret groups and made solo performances into the 1970s.

== Life ==
Cilli Wang studied dance in Vienna, she had previously been a student of Gertrud Bodenwieser. Her debut as a dancer came in 1929, where she danced for the nominations by Ernst Ceiss. In 1932 she married Austrian writer, poet and philosopher Hans Schlesinger, who wrote the solo play Harlekinade, where Wang played solo. In 1932 she went to Berlin and played for several cabaret groups, such as Werner Fincks Cabaret, The Blue Bird and Die Pfeffermühle by Erika Mann. In 1936 she joined her husband’s cabaret group Fröhliche Landtmann in Vienna.

In 1938, Wang joined her husband in Sweden. During this tour Anschluss took place where Nazi Germany invaded Austria. Since both Wang and Hans Schlesinger were Jewish, they feared for their lives and fled to the Netherlands. In 1939 and 1940, Wang appeared in the ABC-cabaret of Wim Kan and Corry Vonk, she also made guest appearances at Cabaret Mallemolen by Cor Ruys. Wang also did some solo performances in Amsterdam and Scheveningen and she starred in the revue. Wang created a large number of magical and absurd characters such as Max and Moritz, a Hague lady, a ballerina, a cleaner and a Tyrolean peasant woman. They used dance, mime, acting, clowning, music, text and acrobatics to put in the characters. In May 1940 the Netherlands was occupied by Nazi Germany and soon took on the occupants anti-Jewish measures. In 1941 she received a call for deportation to the labour camp, which was a Nazi euphemism for the extermination camp. Wang and her husband were suspicious of the call and looked for a safe hiding place.

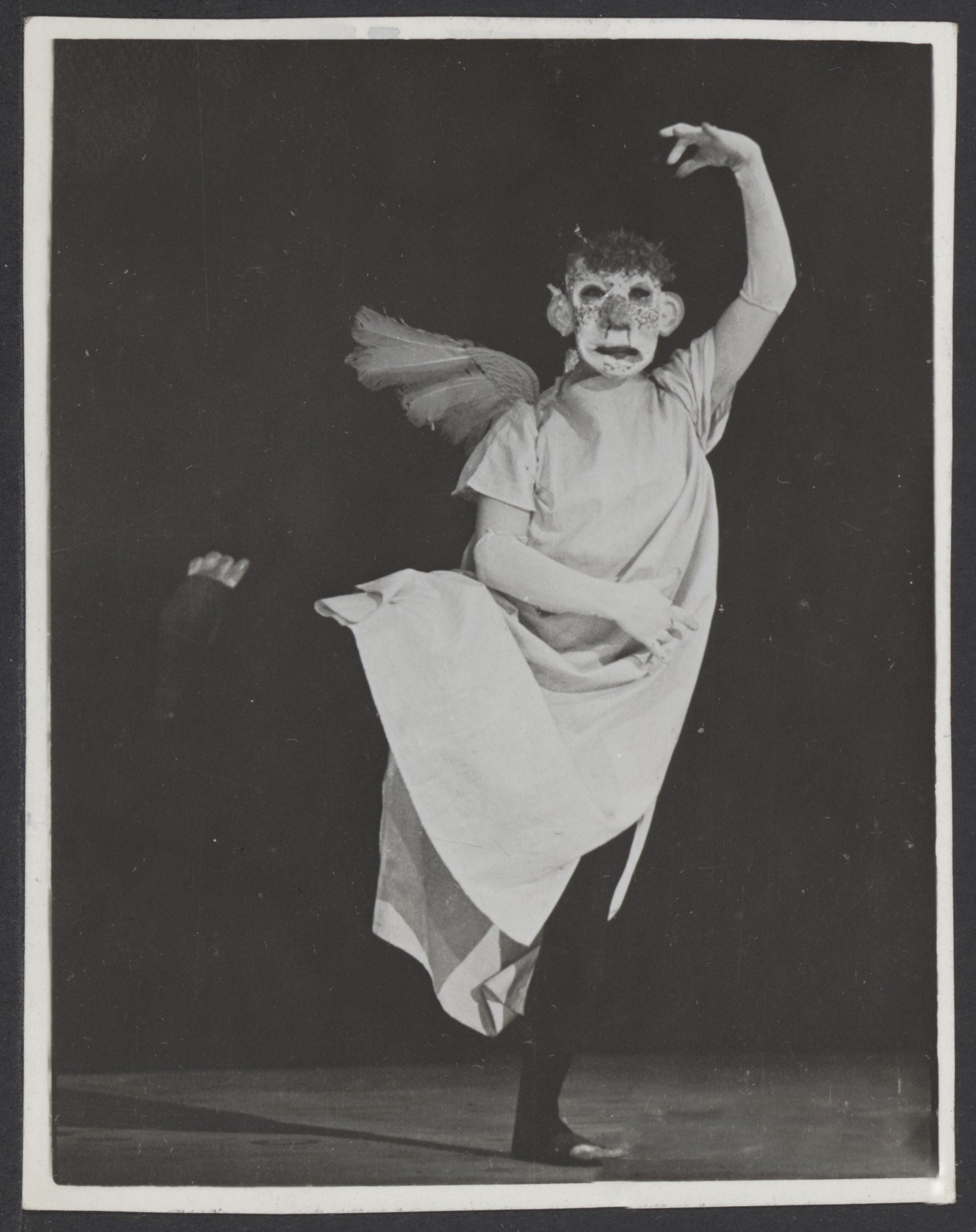
Cilli Wang (1947)

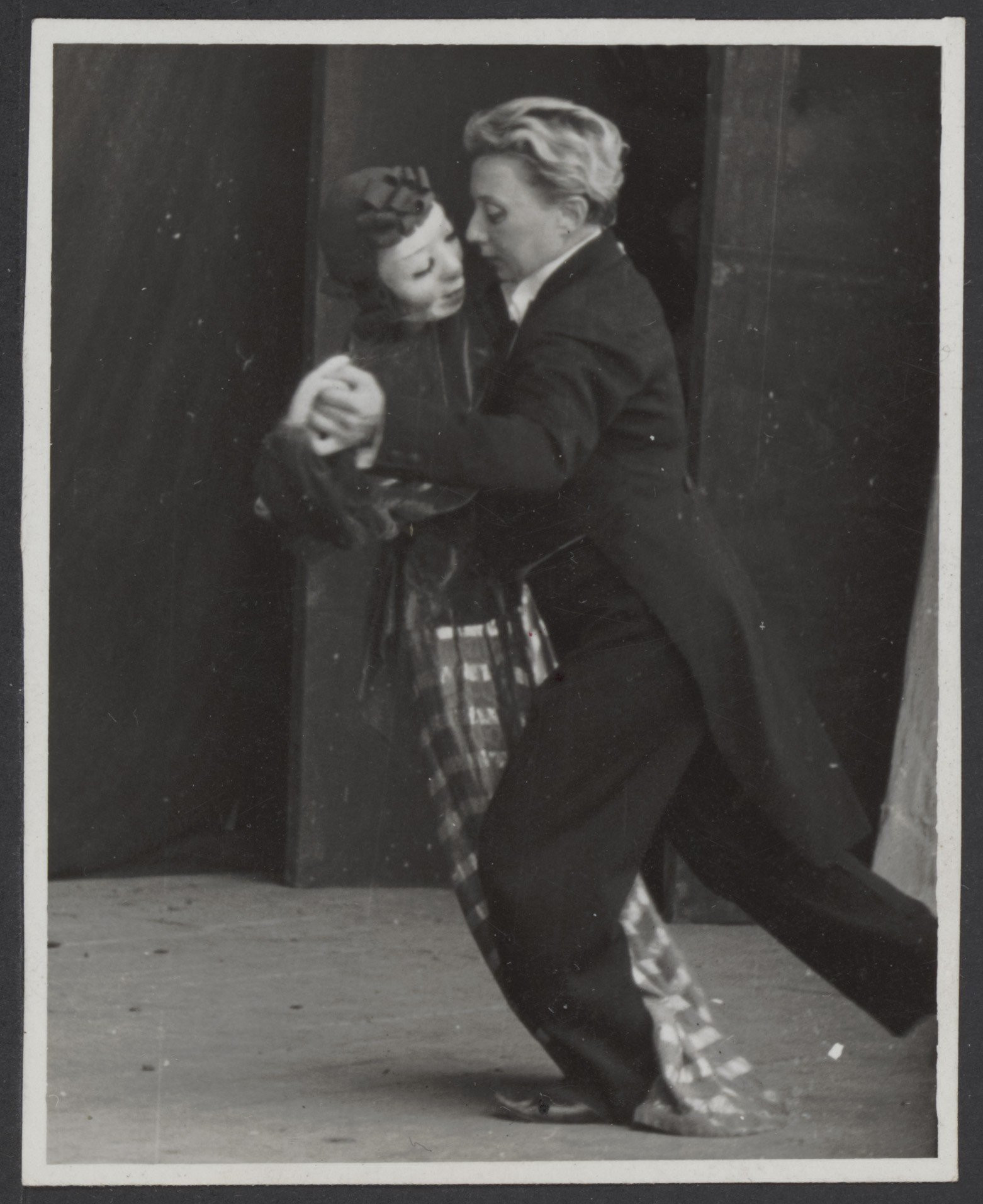
Dancing

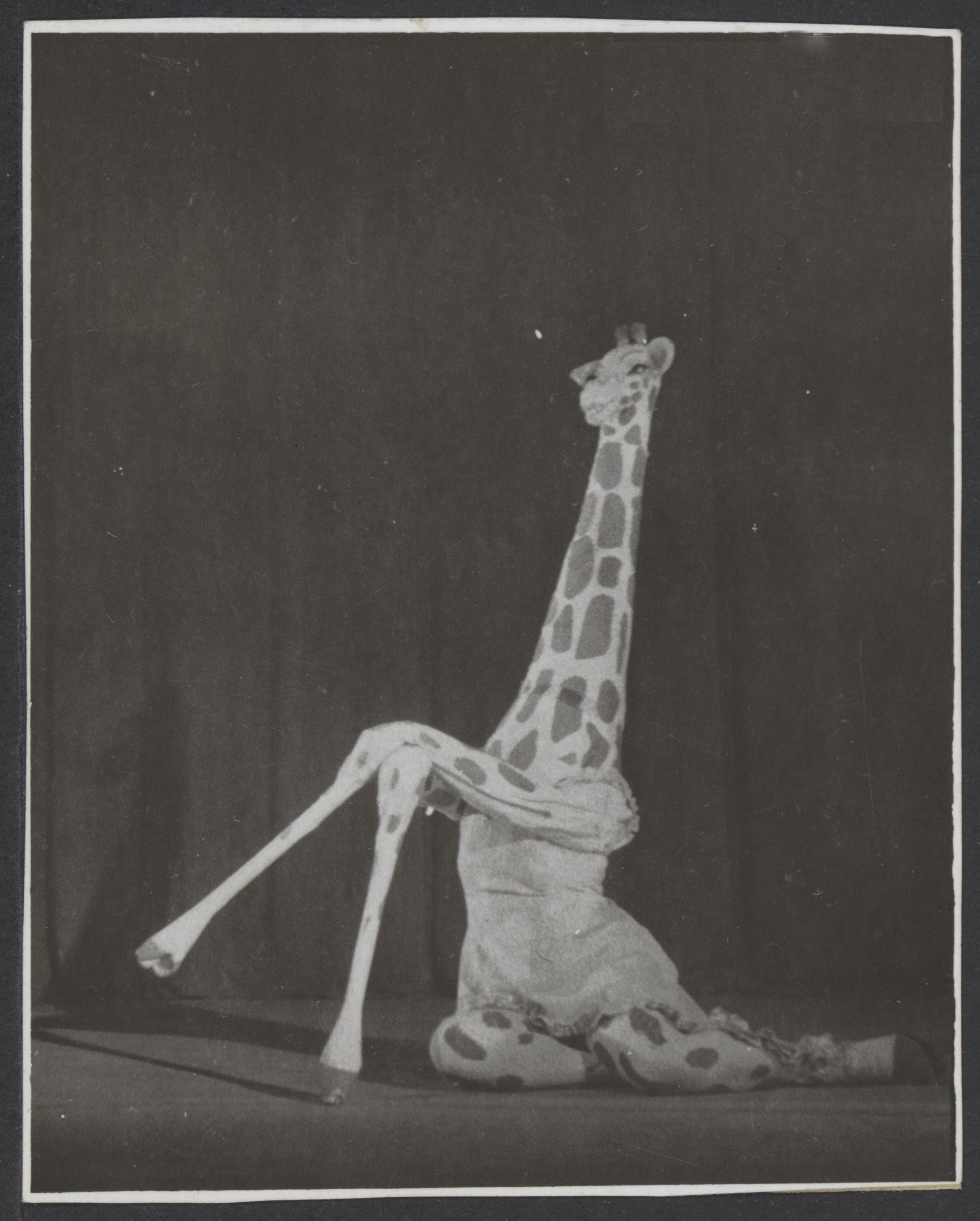
Salon Giraffe

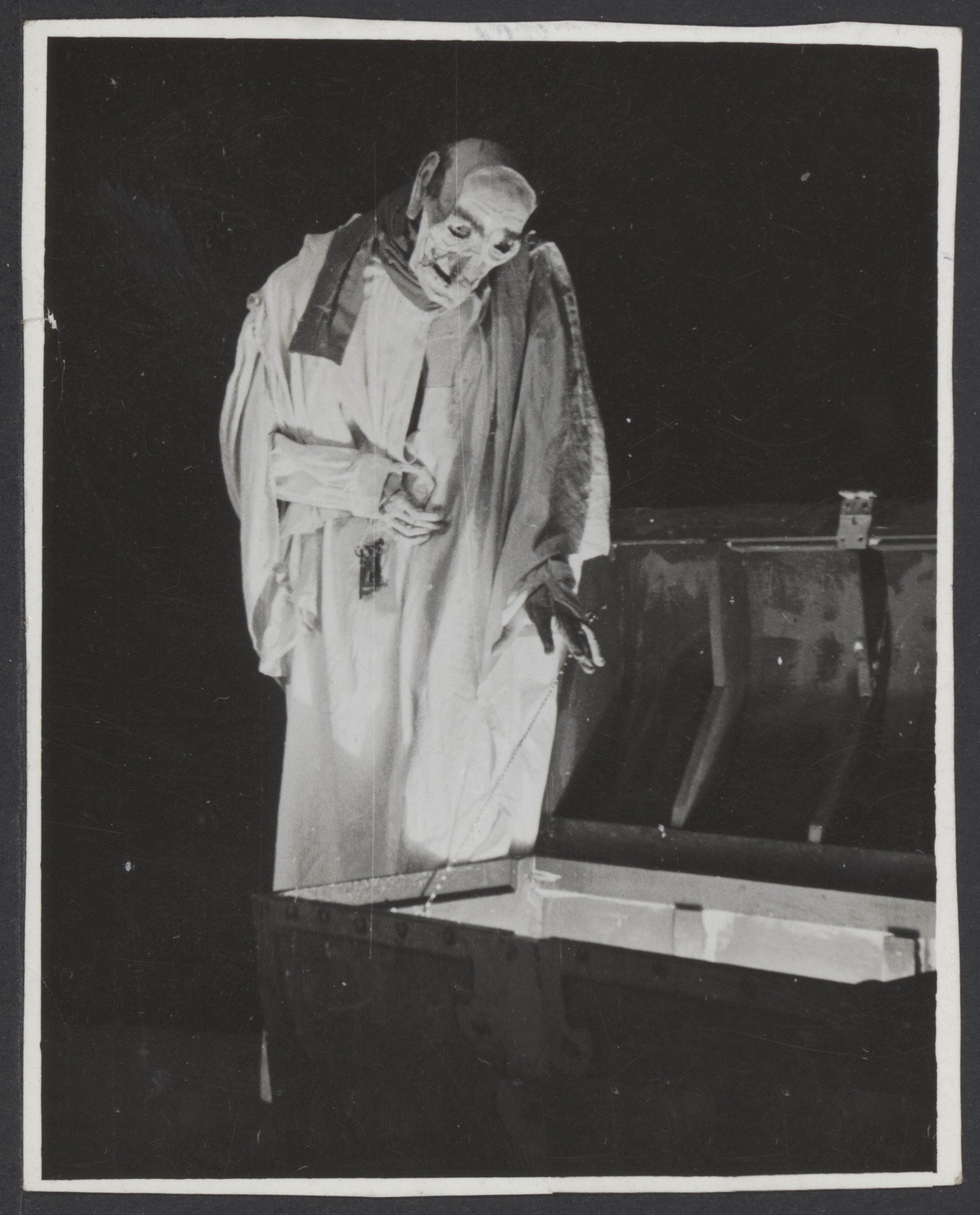
Miser

In April 1945 Hans Schlesinger succumbed to the effects of an exhausting life in hiding. Wang survived the war and returned to work. She performed in the Kurhaus Cabaret by Cor Ruys, acting in the ABC-cabaret of Wim Kan and did her first solo dance project in 1946. For the first time there were no speeches, just the piano accompaniment of Wim de Vries. De Vries was her constant companion. They again played a number of characters and fourth over the triumphs of her shows. In 1952 she became a Dutch naturalized citizen. On January 25, 1959, Wang came to the United States and was presented in concert by Raymond D. Bowman at the Wilshire Ebell Theater in Los Angeles. She received outstanding reviews.

She performed until 1971, when Wim de Vries retired and Wang would no longer perform. In 1975 she returned to her hometown of Vienna. She remained a Dutch citizen, though she did not blame the Austrian government for the murder of her entire family during the Nazi occupation. Since she felt at home in Vienna she lived there until her death on July 10, 2005.

== Sources ==
- Hanny Alkema, "The Wonderful World of Cilli Wang". Amsterdam: 1996
- Ger Van Leeuwen, "Determined to eternal life: The world of CIlli Wang in the Theatre Museum". In: Music and Dance 9 (1981)
- Cilli Wang in the Jewish Women's Archive
