= Àngel Guimerà =

Spanish writer, poet and playwright

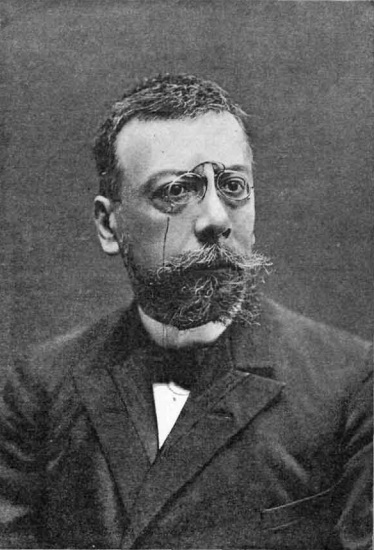
- Guimerà, ca. 1894, by Pau Audouard
- Born: Àngel Guimerà y Jorge; 6 May 1845 or 1847, or 1849; Santa Cruz de Tenerife, Canary Islands, Spain
- Died: 18 July 1924; Barcelona, Spain
- Resting place: Montjuïc Cemetery
- Occupations: Writer, poet, playwright
- Works: Terra baixa, La filla del mar

Àngel Guimerà i Jorge (Note: Born as Ángel Guimerá y Jorge, before the Catalan spelling normalization of Pompeu Fabra. However, during his life he signed his works using different forms of his name, as Ángel Guimerá, Angel Guimerá, Ángel Guimera or Angel Guimerà. In modern Catalan works he is known as Àngel Guimerà i Jorge or just Àngel Guimerà.) (Catalan pronunciation: [ˈaɲʒəl ɣiməˈɾa j ˈxoɾxe]; 6 May 1845 or 6 May 1847 or 1849 – 18 July 1924), usually known simply as Àngel Guimerà, was a Catalan Spanish playwright and poet. His work is known for bringing together under romantic aspects the main elements of realism. He is considered one of the principal representatives of the Renaixença movement, at the end of the nineteenth century.

== Life ==
He was born in Santa Cruz de Tenerife, Canary Islands, to a Catalan father and a Canary Islander mother. At an early age, Guimerà's family moved to Catalonia, where they settled at his father's birthplace, El Vendrell.

Guimerà wrote a number of popular plays, which were translated into other languages and performed abroad, proving instrumental in the revival of Catalan language as a literary language (Renaixença) in the late 19th and early 20th centuries. By far, the most famous was his realistic drama Terra baixa (Lowlands, also translated as Martha of the Lowlands). Written in 1896, it quickly became an international sensation. The play was translated into 15 different languages and the Spanish translation was presented regularly for a period of thirty years by the theatre of Enric Borràs throughout Spain and Latin America. In English, the play received three Broadway productions between 1903 and 1936.

In addition to being a popular stage play, Terra baixa was made into six films, including a silent film in the United States, entitled "Martha of the Lowlands" (1914) and Leni Riefenstahl's Tiefland (1954). Furthermore, it served as the source material for two operas: Eugen d'Albert's German opera Tiefland (1903) and Fernand Le Borne's La Catalane (French).

Guimerà was nominated twenty-three times for the Nobel Prize in Literature, though he never won.

Guimerà had a number of close relationships with men. He lived for many years with journalist and politician Pere Aldavert i Martorell; on 14 February 1910 they granted each other legal powers for the other's affairs before a notary. They were buried in the same tomb.

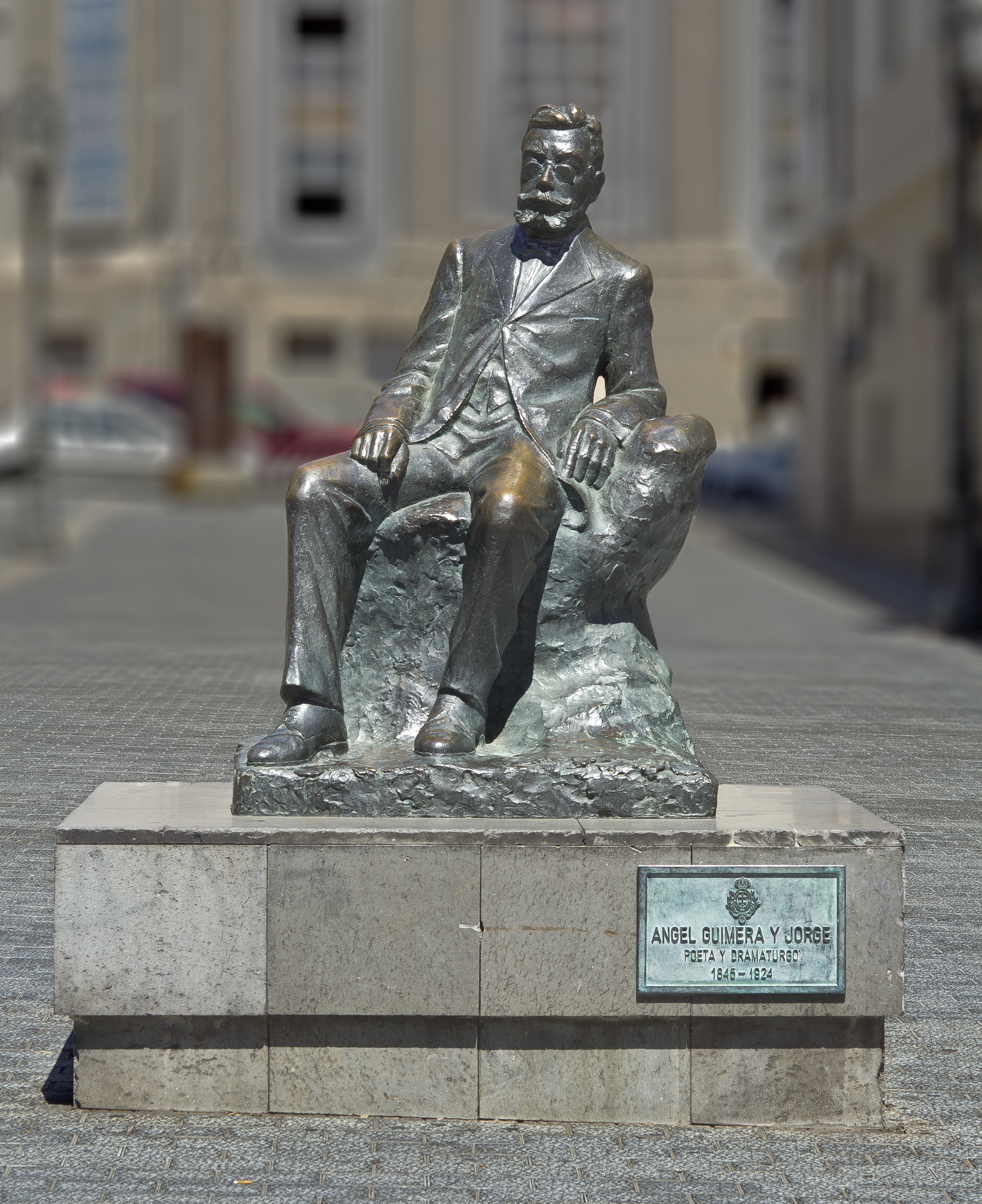
Statue of Guimerà in front of the Teatro Guimerá in Santa Cruz de Tenerife

When Guimerà died in 1924, he was offered a state funeral in Barcelona and was buried at the Montjuïc Cemetery.

In his hometown of Santa Cruz de Tenerife is a theater built in his name (Teatro Guimerá).

== Terra baixa ==
Terra baixa is the story of Marta, a poor girl from Barcelona, who finds herself the young lover to Sebastià, the most important landowner in the Catalan lowlands. Sebastià must marry a woman of prominence to keep his land and inheritance. To squelch gossip of his relationship with Marta but still keep her as his lover, Sebastià marries her off to the unsuspecting Manelic, a young shepherd from the Pyrenees, and sets the newlyweds up in the house attached to the town's mill. Marta is ashamed of having a lover before marriage and is at first cold to her new caring husband, who she thinks agreed to marry her like this. The townspeople gossip and laugh at them. Manelic confronts Marta, who tells Manelic the truth, and expects (and wants) him to kill her. Manelic forgives his wife and takes revenge on Sebastià.

== La filla del mar ==
Another well-known work by Guimerà is the play La filla del mar (The daughter of the sea, 1900), that recounts the story of Àgata (Agate).

Her name is that of a precious stone, in sharp contrast to the contempt in which she is held. Her uncertain origins, and the fact that she had been born "among Moors" renders her an object of hate, branded as a heretic.

One of the few people who does not exclude her is Baltasanet, who states that "When we are born, we are all Moors." Àgata is perfectly conscious of the fact that she is considered a "nobody" and a "nuisance". "What evil have I done, that everyone despises me?", she asks. The discrimination she faces leads ultimately to her death.

Àgata feels attracted by the sea, which seems to be calling out to her, in the voices of her parents.

For her, there is a symbolic opposition between sea and earth, the latter being all about misery and tears, whereas the sea harbours peacefulness and truth. Drowning, for her, would be a return to the 'amniotic fluid' of the sea from which she was born.

Like a sailor, she is strong, brave, and vital. At the same time she is sensitive, and when she finds in Pere Màrtir the affection she had desperately lacked, they are able to connect. She excuses his past as a ladies' man, but, overcome by jealousy, threatens him with death if he relapses.

The story of Àgata involves numerous literary allusions and archetypes, from mythological aquatic characters, to the legend of Sappho committing suicide by throwing herself from a cliff into the sea. Translated by Rudolf Lothar, the work was the basis of Eugen d'Albert's 1912 opera Liebesketten.

== Tributes ==
The main theater of Santa Cruz de Tenerife, the oldest on the Canary Islands, is called Teatro Guimerá after this playwright. On the facade of the Museo Municipal de Bellas Artes de Santa Cruz de Tenerife are a number of marble busts representing famous people from Tenerife, among them Guimerà.

Avenida Ángel Guimerá, where the theater is located, is also named after the playwright and poet, as this was the street on which he was born.

A seated bronze statue of Guimerà was made in Catalonia in 1920 by Josep Cardona i Furró (1878–1923). This original model was then expanded by Josep Maria Codina for Barcelona's Plaça del Pi in 1983. Two replicas were made of this statue, one of which was gifted to the town of El Vendrell (in the province of Tarragona) in 1986. The other is located opposite the stated Teatro Guimerá in Santa Cruz de Tenerife.

He was also named adopted son of Barcelona in 1909.

== Publications ==
=== Poetry ===
- Lo rei y'l conceller (1870)
- Indíbil y Mandoni (1875)
- Cleopatra (1876)
- L'any mil (1877)
- Romiatge (1877)
- Lo darrer plany d'En Clarís (1877)
- Jocs de miralls (1905)
- Cants a la Patria (1906)
- Segon llibre de poesies (1920)
- Poblet

=== Theatre ===
- Andrónica (1905)
- L'aranya (1906)
- L'Eloy (1906)
- En Pep Botella (1906)
- La Santa Espina (rondalla) (1907)
- La reina vella (1908)
- Titaina (1910)
- Sainet trist (1910)
- La reina jove (1911)
- Jesús que torna (1917)
- Indíbil i Mandoni (1917)
- Al cor de la nit (1918)
- L'ànima és meva (1919)
- Alta banca (1921)
- Joan Dalla (1921)
- Per dret diví
- Euda d'Uriac (opera)

=== Prose ===
- Rosa de Lima i altres proses (1920)
