= Lowlander =

Lowlander or Lowlanders may refer to:

- Lowlander (album), a 2000 album by Ed Miller
- Albion Lowlander, a Scottish-built low-height double-decker bus
- Lowlanders Białystok, an American football team based in Białystok, Poland

== See also ==
- Lowland (disambiguation)
