= Teatro Guimerá =

Theatre in Santa Cruz de Tenerife, Spain

Coordinates: 28.465914°N 16.250504°W

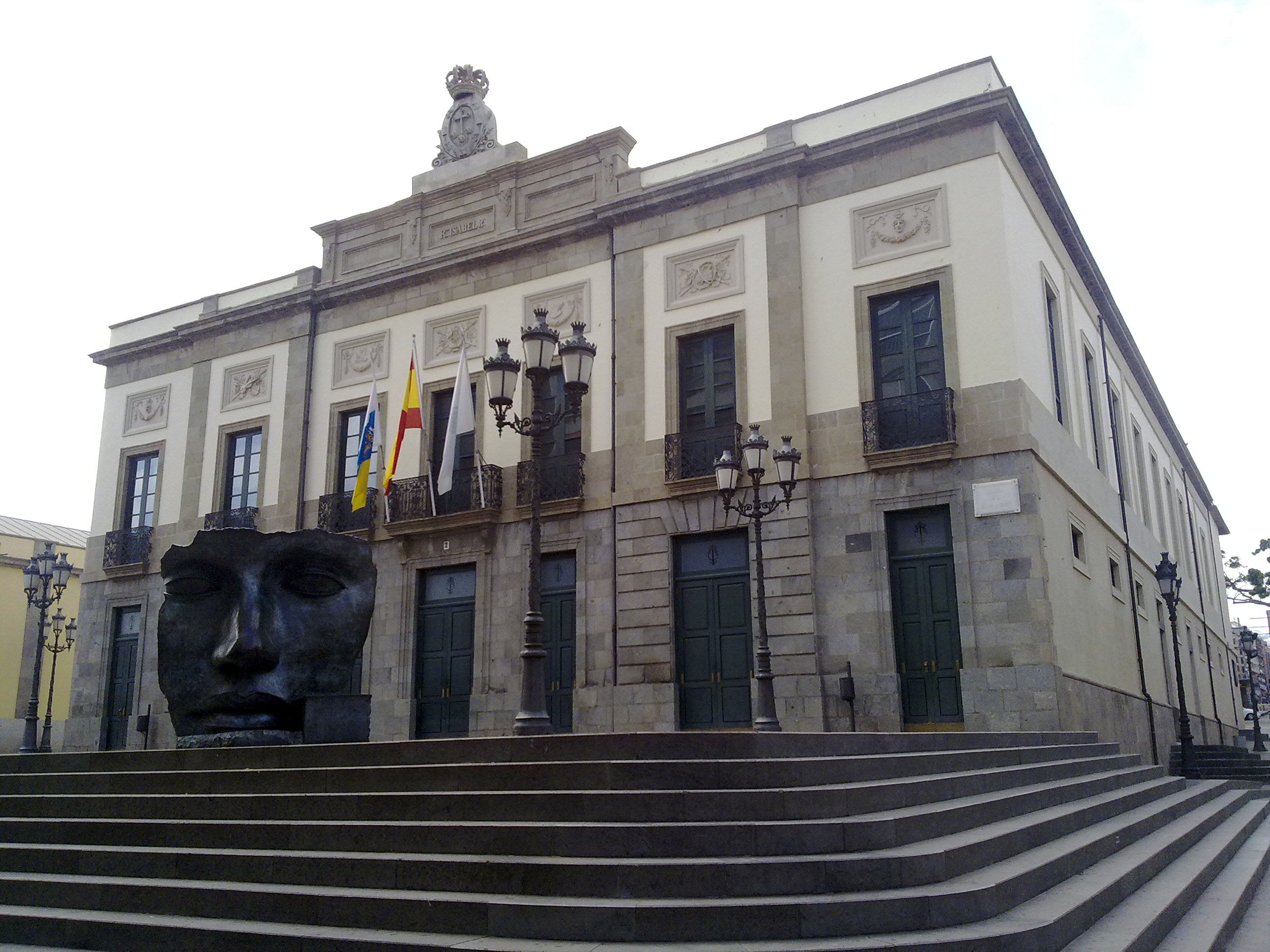
Teatro Guimerá

Teatro Guimerá (formerly known as Teatro Municipal) is a theatre located in Santa Cruz de Tenerife, the capital city of the island of Tenerife in the Canary Islands (Spain). Built in 1849, it is the oldest theater in the Canary Islands. In 1923 it was named after the writer, poet and playwright Àngel Guimerà, born in Santa Cruz de Tenerife.

== History ==
The theater was built on the site previously occupied by the Saint Dominic Convent or Our Lady of Consolation belonging to the Dominican Order and one of the two convents existing in the city. The Spanish confiscation forced the closure of this convent until it was demolished. On the ruins of this convent the future Guimerá Theater would be constructed in a similar way to the Theater of the Lyceum of Barcelona, which was also built on a convent.

The theatre was built in 1849 by the architect Manuel de Oráa in classical-romance style and it originally received the name Teatro Municipal de Santa Cruz de Tenerife. It underwent important works of modification in 1911, mainly of the interior of the building, headed by Antonio Pintor. Between 1989 and 1991 works of restoration and modernisation were done by the architect Carlos Schwartz. Further improvements were made in 2010 under supervision of Haris Kozo.

The theater has been a venue for opera since 1861, when Verdi's Ernani was presented. Operas were usually performed in October and November, with three or four operas given one performance each, usually with an international cast accompanied by the Orquesta Sinfónica de Tenerife. Both orchestra concerts and operas are now performed at the Auditorio de Tenerife, which opened in 2003.
