= Rasmussen (disambiguation) =

Rasmussen is a surname of Danish and Norwegian origin. It may also refer to:

== Geography ==
- Rasmussen, Queensland, a suburb in the City of Townsville, Queensland, Australia
- Rasmussen Basin, a natural waterway through the Canadian Arctic Archipelago in the territory of Nunavut
- Rasmussen Lowlands, a 3,000 km^{2} coastal plain complex of wetlands in Nunavut, Canada
- Knud Rasmussen Glacier in the far northwest of Greenland, to the north of the Thule Air Base

== Other uses ==
- Murder of Sherri Rasmussen
- Rasmussen's aneurysm, a pulmonary artery aneurysm adjacent or within a tuberculous cavity
- Rasmussen College, a private college offering degrees at multiple campuses in Minnesota
- Rasmussen's encephalitis, a rare, progressive neurological disorder
- Rasmussen Reports, an American public opinion polling company
- The "Rasmussen Report'", an informal name for the WASH-1400 report about nuclear reactor safety
- Knud Rasmussen-class patrol vessel, a class of offshore patrol vessel operating in the Royal Danish Navy from 2008

== See also ==
- Kall-Rasmussen Fragment, a parchment page (ca. 1275) from Saxo Gesta Danorum
- The Journals of Knud Rasmussen, a Canadian-Danish film about the pressures on the traditional Inuit culture when explorer Knud Rasmussen introduces European cultural influences
