= The Slave Market (film) =

1917 film

- Directed by: Hugh Ford
- Screenplay by: Clara Beranger; Frederic Arnold Kummer
- Starring: Pauline Frederick; Thomas Meighan; Al Hart; Ruby Hoffman; Wellington A. Playter
- Cinematography: Ned Van Buren
- Production company: Famous Players Film Company
- Distributed by: Paramount Pictures
- Release date: January 1, 1917
- Running time: 50 minutes
- Country: United States
- Language: English

The Slave Market is a 1917 American adventure silent film directed by Hugh Ford and written by Clara Beranger and Frederic Arnold Kummer. Starring Pauline Frederick, Thomas Meighan, Al Hart, Ruby Hoffman, and Wellington A. Playter, it was released on January 1, 1917, by Paramount Pictures.

The film premiered at the Strand Theatre in New York City and had an additional opening at the Garrick Theatre in Minneapolis, MN in January 1917.

== Cast ==
- Pauline Frederick as Ramona
- Thomas Meighan as John Barton
- Al Hart as Firebrand
- Ruby Hoffman as Anna
- Wellington A. Playter as Portuguese Joe

== Preservation ==
The Slave Market is currently presumed lost. In February of 2021, the film was cited by the National Film Preservation Board on their Lost U.S. Silent Feature Films list.
