= Wellington A. Playter =

English actor

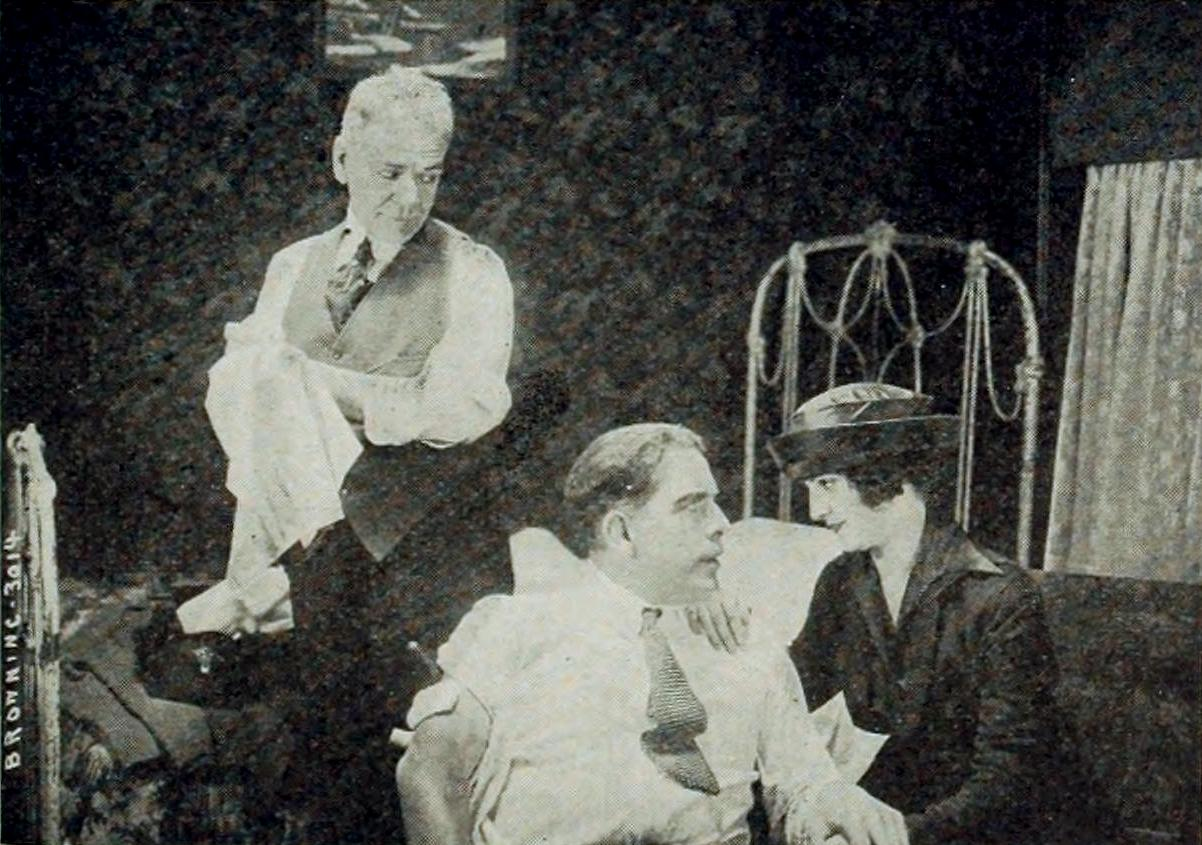
- Wellington A. Playter (center) and Priscilla Dean in The Wicked Darling (1919)
- Born: 9 December 1879; Rawcliffe, North Riding of Yorkshire, England
- Died: 15 July 1937 (aged 57); Oakland, California, United States
- Occupation: Actor
- Years active: 1913-1921

Wellington A. Playter (9 December 1879 – 15 July 1937) was an English actor. He appeared in 43 films between 1913 and 1921.

== Selected filmography ==
(Note:* means that he was credited as Wellington Playter)
- The Daughter of the Hills (1913)
- An American Citizen (1914)
- The Ring and the Man (1914)
- The County Chairman (1914)
- Marta of the Lowlands (1914) *
- The Man from Mexico (1914)
- The Morals of Marcus (1915)
- Coral (1915) *
- The Slave Market (1917) *
- The Sin Woman (1917) *
- Polly of the Circus (1917) *
- The Eagle's Eye (1918)
- The Wicked Darling (1919)
- The Struggle Everlasting (1918)
- Spotlight Sadie (1919) *
- Fool's Gold (1919)
- Back to God's Country (1919)
