= The Wicked Darling =

1919 film

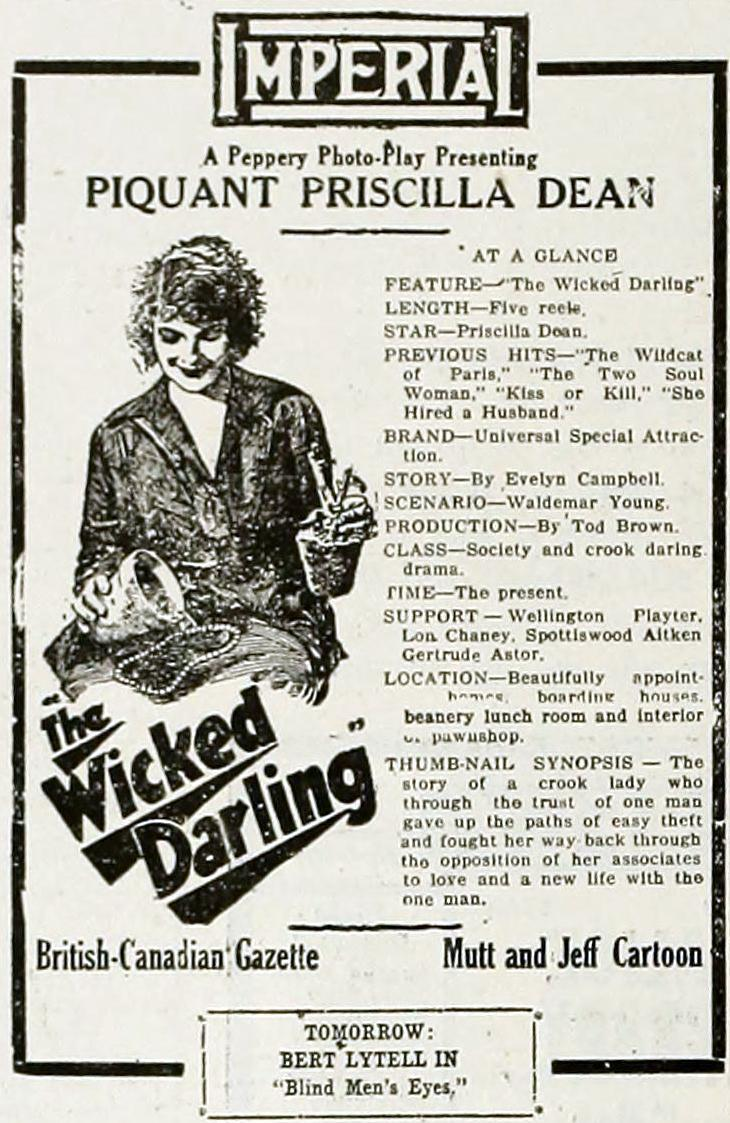
- Ad for film
- Directed by: Tod Browning
- Written by: Evelyn Campbell (story); Harvey Gates (screenplay)
- Starring: Priscilla Dean; Wellington A. Playter; Lon Chaney
- Cinematography: Alfred Gosden
- Distributed by: Universal Studios
- Release date: February 24, 1919
- Running time: 6 reels (59 minutes)
- Country: United States
- Language: Silent (English intertitles)

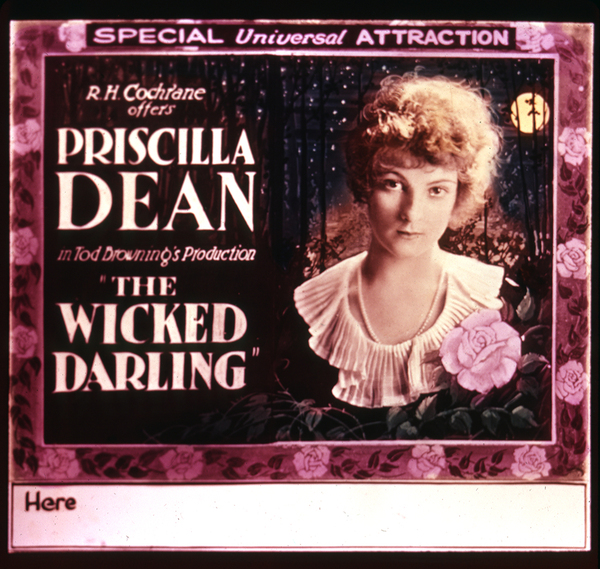
lantern slide The Wicked Darling

The Wicked Darling is a 1919 American silent crime film directed by Tod Browning, and starring Priscilla Dean, Wellington A. Playter and Lon Chaney as pickpocket "Stoop" Connors. This was the first time Lon Chaney appeared in a Tod Browning film, and many other collaborations between the two men would follow.

The film was considered to be a lost film until a copy (with Dutch intertitles) was found in Europe in the 1990s. It was shown at a Tod Browning film festival in Europe in 1996. The copy now resides in the Nederlands Filmmuseum. The print is complete but suffers noticeable decomposition in two separate key scenes. The Wicked Darling was released on DVD (with translated English intertitles) in September, 2005 along with Victory, another early Lon Chaney film appearance. A still exists showing Lon Chaney in the role of sleazy Stoop Connors, as he and a compatriot are about to kidnap the heroine.

The screenplay was written by Harvey Gates, based on a story idea by Evelyn Campbell. Some references state that Waldemar Young also worked on the screenplay, but that appears untrue. Chaney historian Jon C. Mirsalis says that Young was originally chosen to write the screenplay, but the writing chores later went to Harvey Gates instead. The film was in production from December 7, 1918, through early January 1919. Chaney later co-starred in two other films with Priscilla Dean, Paid in Advance and Outside The Law.

== Plot ==
The Wicked Darling (1919)

The wealthy Kent Mortimer has been bankrupted, and while attending a dress ball with his fiancée, Adele Hoyt, he tells her that he must sell all of his household goods to pay off his debts. Adele immediately breaks their engagement and returns all of his gifts, except for a string of pearls which she drops on the sidewalk as she enters her cab. Mary Stevens, a pickpocket and thief, snatches up the pearls and flees the scene with the police in hot pursuit. She sees an open door in a mansion and takes refuge inside.

The mansion is that of Kent Mortimer, and she learns that the pearls really belong to him, but she doesn't let him know she has them. Mary later gets a job as a waitress, and one day Mortimer wanders into the restaurant where they meet again. He begins to date Mary regularly, and Stoop Connors, one of Mary's fellow gang members, gets jealous and shoots Mortimer in the arm. Mary helps Mortimer to walk home (he's living in a run down apartment building now), and learns that his rent is overdue and that he is about to be evicted very soon. She sells two of the pearls to a fence named Fadem, and gives the money to Mortimer's landlady to bail him out.

Fadem and Stoop search Mary's apartment trying to find the rest of the pearls, but she constantly carries the pearls on her. Mortimer is shocked to learn of Mary's true past life as a criminal and tells her they cannot see each other any longer. Mary sends the pearls back to Adele who, in turn, returns them to Mortimer. When Mortimer finds out what Mary has done, he goes off in search of her to beg her forgiveness, but Fadem and Stoop have kidnapped Mary and are trying to force her to tell them where the pearls are.

Mortimer breaks in just as they are choking her to death. He attacks the two men, and a terrible fight ensues. Mary slips from the room and calls the burly bartender from the café below, a huge brute of a man who worships Mary, and he arrives just in time to save Mortimer from being stabbed to death. Fadem and Stoop both slink off like rats into the night, and Mortimer winds up with Mary. They buy a farm out in the country, and hire the bartender as their handyman.

== Cast ==
- Priscilla Dean as Mary Stevens
- Wellington A. Playter as Kent Mortimer
- Lon Chaney as Stoop Connors
- Spottiswoode Aitken as Fadem
- Gertrude Astor as Adele Hoyt
- Kalla Pasha as The Bartender
- Martha Mattox as The Waitress (uncredited)

== Reception ==
"FOLKS! Here's a real photoplay treat! A perfectly wonderful love story told in a way that will make you grip your seat and hold your breath – played so you'll never, never forget it. Don't miss it! – Urbana Daily Democrat (Print Ad; Urbana, Ohio, October 30, 1919)

"This last offering should be a success in every way. The story is strong and interesting, the situations good, and it impresses in its apparent reality. Particularly commendable is the work of Lon Chaney as "Stoop", a crook. The entire picture carries itself along with lucidity." – Variety

"This new six-part Universal offering is an exceptional tale of slum life in the city ... Despite its picturing of the seamy side of life, the picture is full of human sympathy and marks a long step ahead for this type of photoplay. The entire cast cooperates with some of the best character work shown on the screen in a long time, Lon Chaney as "Stoop" and Spottiswoode Aitken as "Uncle Fadem" being especially good." – Moving Picture World.

"This is a remarkable film, and more than that it is a genuinely interesting one for those who like crook stories with a liberal element of romance... When it comes to a crook role, Lon Chaney ... is excellent." – Wid's Film Daily.

== See also ==
- List of rediscovered films
