= Tiefland (film) =

1954 opera film by Leni Riefenstahl

- Directed by: Leni Riefenstahl
- Written by: Leni Riefenstahl; Harald Reinl
- Based on: Tiefland by Eugen d'Albert; Rudolph Lothar (that is based in Terra Baixa, famous catalan play by Àngel Guimerà)
- Produced by: Leni Riefenstahl; Josef Plesner
- Starring: Bernhard Minetti; Leni Riefenstahl
- Cinematography: Albert Benitz
- Edited by: Leni Riefenstahl
- Music by: Herbert Windt; Giuseppe Becce
- Distributed by: Allianz Verleih; Deutsche Cosmopol; Taurus (video)
- Release date: 11 February 1954
- Running time: 98 minutes
- Country: West Germany
- Language: German
- Budget: DM 8.5 million

Tiefland ("Lowlands") is a 1954 West German opera drama film directed, produced, co-written, edited by and starring Leni Riefenstahl, and based on the 1903 eponymous opera composed by Eugen d'Albert to a libretto by Rudolph Lothar based on the 1896 Catalan play Terra baixa by Àngel Guimerà. The film co-stars Bernhard Minetti, and is Riefenstahl's last feature film as both director and lead actress.

Riefenstahl started to develop the script in 1934, with the movie being shot between 1940 and 1944. However, it was not completed by the end of World War II and was eventually finalized and released on February 11, 1954. It was once listed as the feature film with the longest production time in history by the Guinness Book of World Records. This record was later surpassed by The Thief and the Cobbler (with 29 years of production from 1964 to 1993), and there exist films with production times that are longer still.

Riefenstahl's movie is the second Tiefland film that is based on the opera, the first one being a silent film in 1922, directed by Adolf E. Licho, with Lil Dagover as the main actress. The earlier American silent movie Marta of the Lowlands (1914) was based on the English translation of a Spanish translation of Guimerà's play.

== Plot ==
Pedro, a shepherd, is sleeping in his hut in the Pyrenean mountains, when his herd is attacked by a lone wolf. He awakens to defend his sheep, and manages to strangle the wolf. Meanwhile, in the Catalan lowlands of northeastern Spain, a canal is completed which diverts water from the farms and fields of the peasants to support the prize bulls of the landowner, Don Sebastian, marquis of Roccabruno. He arrogantly rejects the request of the peasants for water. However, he has significant debts and needs money. The rich Amelia plans to marry him, but he offends her.

Martha, a "beggar dancer", comes to the village and entertains the people. Sebastian sees her and takes her to his castle, enchanted by her beauty and grace. He keeps her as his mistress in a "golden cage". Martha pleads with him to listen to the plight of the peasants, but he rejects their request again. Seeing his arrogance and inhumanity, she runs away. She collapses in exhaustion in the mountains where Pedro finds her and takes her to his hut. Sebastian's men locate her and return her to the castle.

Sebastian, in dire need to settle his finances, conjures a plan. He will marry Amelia but keep Martha as a mistress; he wants her married to somebody he can manipulate and control. Pedro is commanded to marry her and is installed in a mill under Sebastian's control. For this, Martha despises Pedro at first; but once she realizes that he married her out of love, she responds. Sebastian arrives to be with his mistress. A fight ensues, and Pedro strangles him as he had done to the wolf. In the final scene, Pedro and Martha walk up to the mountains.

== Production ==
Riefenstahl began working on the script in 1934, but shelved it when she became more involved with Nazi propaganda films. After the beginning of World War II, and disturbed by atrocities she witnessed, she had herself dispensed from shooting war documentaries. Using her influence as Hitler's favorite film maker she managed her own production company, Riefenstahl Film, GmbH, independently of the control of Joseph Goebbels who oversaw cultural and propaganda activities. Financed by Hitler with money from the Nazi party and the government, she remained outside of Goebbels' control. Goebbels eventually was not happy about it as the project ran into difficulties and cost overruns. Resuming her work on Tiefland, Riefenstahl started filming in Spain in 1940, but forced by war events soon shifted her work to the Alps, in Germany in the Karwendel and in Italy in the Rosengarten of the Dolomites, as well as the Babelsberg Studios in Berlin. Near Mittenwald, the Spanish village of Roccabruno was reconstructed. Although the German press anticipated the release of the movie in 1941, the production proved to be much more difficult and costly and outdoor shooting lasted until 1944. In 1941, Goebbels complained about the "waste of money", and one year later called it a "rat's nest of entanglements". Problems were compounded by Riefenstahl's depression and other ailments, poor weather, accidents, and the difficulty of getting actors and staff organized during the war. Eventually, at a cost of about 8.5 million ℛ︁ℳ︁, Tiefland was the most expensive black-and-white movie produced in Nazi Germany. After the bombing of the Babelsberg studios in Berlin, the Barrandov Studios in Prague were used to further the work, and by the time the war came to the end, Riefenstahl was in the editing and synchronization process at Kitzbühel.

Riefenstahl took the female lead role of Martha, a step that was not originally planned; however, she claimed, that she did not find an actress to her liking available at the time, and so she did it. Her last major role had been a decade before. She may have been attracted to play a dancer, as dancing was her original artistic calling. She later regretted the decision, as she looked much too old by her own account. "When I saw myself on the screen, I was embarrassed. There was no doubt about it, I was miscast." Critics seemed to agree: she was over forty, while her lover was played by the 23-year-old Franz Eichberger.

Bernhard Minetti played Sebastian. Arnold Fanck, Veit Harlan and Georg Wilhelm Pabst all gave directorial assistance at one time or the other. Harald Reinl, who co-wrote the script, choreographed her dancing scene. Herbert Windt and Giuseppe Becce worked on the musical score that was inspired by Eugen d'Albert's opera. The camera work delivered later well-received nature shots of the Karwendel and Dolomite mountains. The wrestling scene of Eichberger with the only half-tamed wolf was supervised by Bernhard Grzimek.

After the war, the film was confiscated and kept by French authorities for several years, but eventually returned to her. Four reels of film were missing when Riefenstahl received the film, notably the scenes shot in Spain. Despite efforts she failed to retrieve the missing footage. After its final editing, the movie was released in 1954.

Riefenstahl deposited a quantity of unused Tiefland material with the Bundesarchiv, the German national archives.

== Release ==
The film secured distribution agreements for Germany, Austria and the United States in 1954. The world premiere was held on 11 February 1954 in Stuttgart. Riefenstahl embarked on a personal appearances tour of Austria in support of the film. She described the tour as "a roaring success". The film was also screened at several film festivals. This included the 1954 Cannes Film Festival where it was screened in the 'out of competition' category. In 1981, the movie was released in the United States with a limited run. When Riefenstahl was ninety, she negotiated the VHS release as part of the Leni Riefenstahl Collection. The 2006 DVD version has an essay by Luc Deneulin on the background to the movie.

== Reception ==
The film was released to mixed reactions and reviews. Riefenstahl regarded it as "objective". Some critics thought that the style and topic of the movie appeared dated and out of touch, and the burden of her name made it unwelcome. Most ignored her acting, although this was recognised by those that commented as a weak performance. The majority of reviewers acknowledged the photographic effects as a credit to her direction.

Jean Cocteau, then chairman of the 1954 Cannes Film Festival, was struck by its "Breughel-like intensity" and "the poetry of the camera". He offered to provide French subtitles himself and attempted to persuade the West German government to make the film its official entry.

On the 1981 American re-release, the New York Times reviewed the film, deciding that the village scenes could have been more successful, but praised the mountain footage:

The shepherd lives high in the mountains. This affords Miss Riefenstahl the opportunity, in her directorial capacity, to film mists and babbling brooks with a grace that recalls Olympia.

The revisionist view of the 1990s has suggested that the film is a criticism of Nazism. Historians have claimed that the film's true value is as a psychobiography, stressing the film as a political allegory rather than melodrama. Sebastian represents a totalitarian government that tramples the rights and needs of the people, while Pedro is a "naïve" and apolitical hero, only doing what he thinks is right. Even the wolf could be construed as an allegory for Adolf Hitler. Riefenstahl insisted that none of her movies had any political messages, and only conceded that this movie was her "inner emigration". Other interpretations saw the marquis as a representation of a Hitler figure, Martha as a stand-in for a repentant Leni, an unfortunate tempted by opportunism.

== Controversy ==
In 1940, shooting of the movie was moved from Spain to Germany and Italy. In the Dolomites, people from the Sarntal were recruited as (paid) extras. However, for extras with a specific "Roma look", Riefenstahl picked children and adults of Roma and Sinti background who were held in Nazi collection camps, so-called "Zigeunerlager". Fifty-one Roma and Sinti prisoners were chosen from the Maxglan-Leopoldskron camp (near Salzburg) for filming in the Alps in 1940, and, in 1942, at least 66 Roma and Sinti prisoners were taken from the Marzahn camp for scenes at Babelsberg. These extras are seen, for instance, in the dancing sequence in the tavern, and Sinti children run alongside Pedro when he comes down from the mountain to marry Martha.

In three denazification trials after the war, Riefenstahl was accused of Nazi collaboration and eventually termed a "fellow traveler"; however, none of the Sinti was asked to testify. The issue surfaced after the German magazine Revue published the use of these extras in 1949 and indicated that they were forced labor and sent later to Auschwitz where many of them perished in the Holocaust. While some of the surviving Sinti claimed that they were mistreated, others dissented. Riefenstahl claimed that she treated these extras well, and that she was not aware that they were going to be sent to Auschwitz. At one point she even insisted that, after the war, she had seen "all the gypsies" who had worked on the film.

In 1982, Nina Gladitz produced a documentary, Zeit des Schweigens und der Dunkelheit (Time of Darkness and Silence), and examined the use of these Sinti in the making of Tiefland. Riefenstahl subsequently sued Gladitz for defamation and while it was shown that she visited camps and selected Sinti for extras, Gladitz' claim that Riefenstahl knew that they would be sent to Auschwitz had to be stricken from the documentary. Gladitz, however, refused to do so, and thus her film has not been shown since.

The issue surfaced again in 2002, when Riefenstahl was one hundred years old. She was taken to court by a Roma group for denial of the extermination of the Romani. As a consequence of the case Riefenstahl made the following apology, "I regret that Sinti and Roma had to suffer during the period of National Socialism. It is known today that many of them were murdered in concentration camps."

== Influence ==
Robert von Dassanowsky indicates that James Cameron's film Titanic echoes and even copies much of what can be found in Tiefland. The setting, of course, is different, but the woman is tempted on one side by power and riches, and on the other side by the man-child character who offers true love. Dassanowsky sees strong parallels in the key scenes of both films.

== See also ==
- List of films shot over three or more years
- Überläufer
