= Carl Godlewski =

German-Austrian Clown, Acrobat, Ballet Teacher and Choreographer

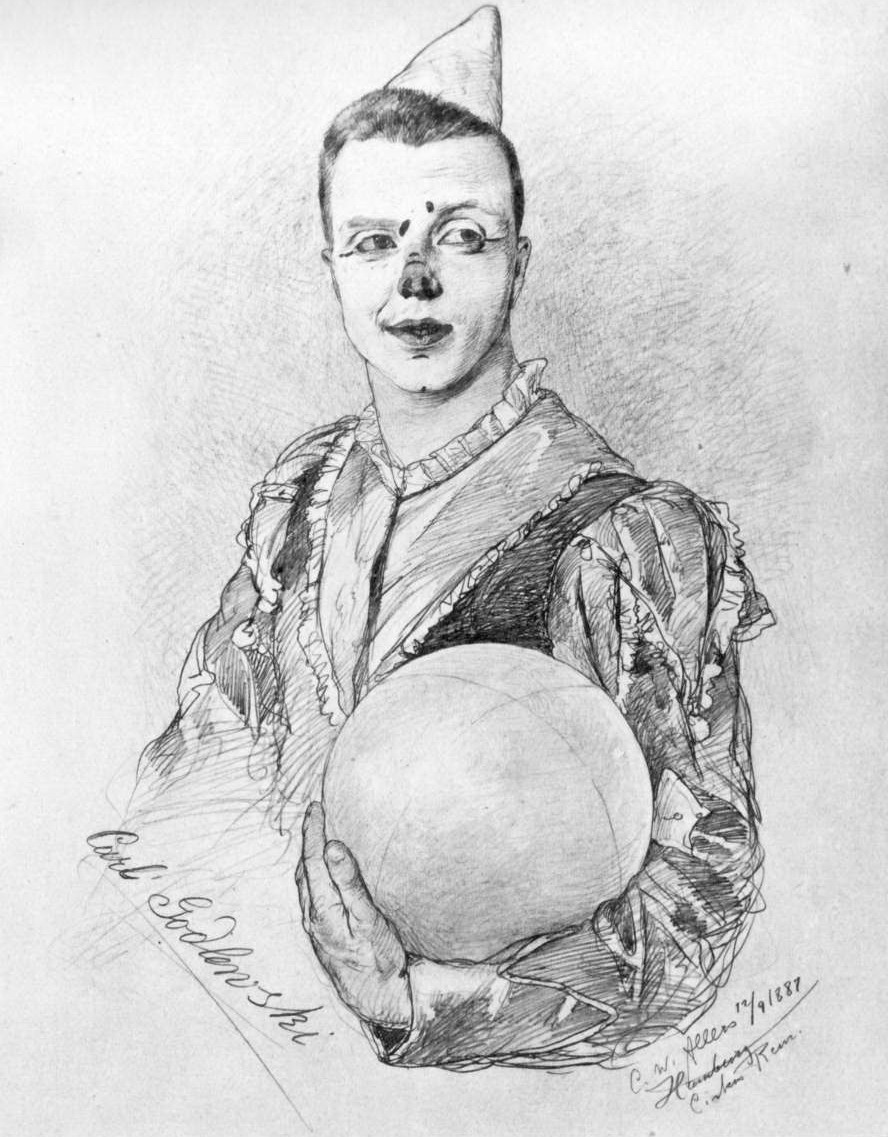
Carl Godlewski as a Clown, 1887, drawn by C.W.Allers

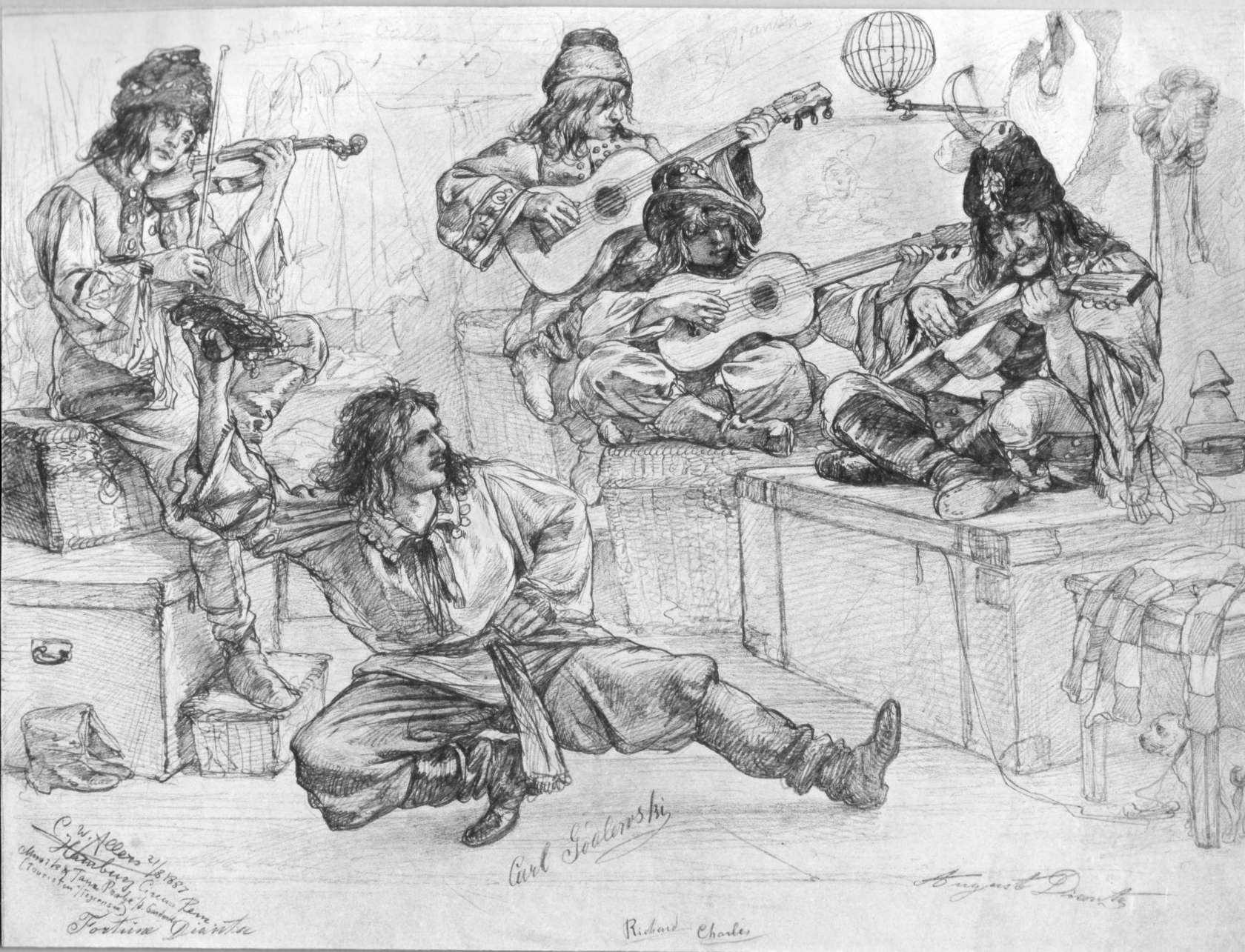
Carl Godlewski 1887, dance rehearsal in Circus Renz, drawn by C.W.Allers

Carl Borromäus Godlewski (20 November 1862 in Dortmund – 8 December 1949 in Mödling) was a circus clown, acrobat, ballet master, dance teacher and choreographer.

== Life and work ==
Godlewski was the son of a builder. Unbeknownst to his father he learned in high school the arts of horse-riding, trapeze arts and acrobatics. After the death of his father Godlewski decided to adopt a circus commitment in order to receive a monthly salary of 50 rubles. After years of traveling with a traveling circus, he was supported by Ernst Renz (1815-1892) to commit to Berlin, where he trained as a clown and teeterboard springer. He worked with elephants and companies of soldiers with fixed bayonets, he later became well known and won world prizes.

Godlewski has already established himself as a celebrity when Wilhelm Jahn (1835-1900) brought him in 1893 from Berlin to the Vienna Court Opera. In his first year of his commitment he was one of the busiest members of the Corps. Because of his reputation, he was appointed at the turn of the century as a dancing master to the court. He was dancing with Grete Wiesenthal, he was the first mime and solo dancer of the Vienna Hofopernballetts from 1918–19, just before the archducal lost its influence over the stage.

In the spring of 1918, Godlewski looked back to 1770 performances on his 25 years anniversary.

Godlewski choreographed numerous ballets at the Vienna Opera, among others, including the world premiere of Erich Wolfgang Korngold’s first work, the pantomime The Snowman (1910). He also designed large revues for the general public, such as the trip Around the world in 80 days (1905) in Vienna's Olympic Arena, which was over 4000 moorings and one of the largest theatres in Europe.

Godlewski's career demonstrates the cultural policy with its educational hostility and sympathy for popular culture, and the declared tolerance during anti-Semitic currents in pre-First World War Vienna, at the time of the Viennese mayor Karl Lueger.

Carl Godlewski married dancer Maria Ludmilla Klahs (1868-1934), with whom he celebrated their silver wedding anniversary in 1914 on his country estate in Tulln an der Donau.

In 1955 the 22nd district Donaustadt of Vienna was named after him, Godlewskigasse.

== Work ==
- —, M(oritz) Kronfeld: Bediene dich selbst! Einactiges Ballett mit Vorspiel. Selbstverlag, Wien 1898, OBV.
- Carl Frühling (Musik), —, Max Lewis: Watteau. Ballet Pantomime in einem Act. Musikdruck. Josef Eberle, Wien (1900), OBV.
- —, Ernst Moriz Kronfeld, Rudolf Gutmannsthal (Musik): Wenn die Katze nicht zu Hause ist … Ballet-Pantomime. Selbstverlag, Wien 1901, OBV.
- Julius Lehnert, Léo Delibes (Musik), Léon Minkus (Musik), — (Choreografie): Rübezahl. Ballet in einem Akt. Wallishausser’sche k.u.k. Hofbuchhandlung, Wien 1910, OBV.
