= Erich Hunold =

German opera singer

Erich Hunold (11 September 1869 in Erfurt - 4 December 1923 in Braunschweig) was a German opera singer, working mainly as a baritone.

== Biography ==
Hunold, the son of a postal clerk, was assigned to study theology after graduating from the Realgymnasium in Weimar. However, as he had been made aware of his beautiful voice by various art experts, he decided to become a stage singer.

He took lessons from Hans von Milde, and Professor Carl Müllerhartung. Hunold secured his first engagement in Teplice, then he worked at the Landestheater in Linz. From there it went upwardly mobile, and Hunold worked at the prestigious city theater in Halle. In 1895 he joined the association of the German National Theater in Prague where he stayed until at least 1905.

In Prague he performed in the leading role of "Mathis" in the premiere of the opera Der Polnische Jude (The Polish Jew) by Karel Weis on 3 January 1901. On the 15 November 1903 Hunold performed in the premiere of the opera Tiefland by Eugen d'Albert as "Sebastiano", alongside Irene Alföldy, and Desider Aranyi.

At the end of his career Hunold was engaged at the court theatre of Braunschweig.
