= Fernand Le Borne =

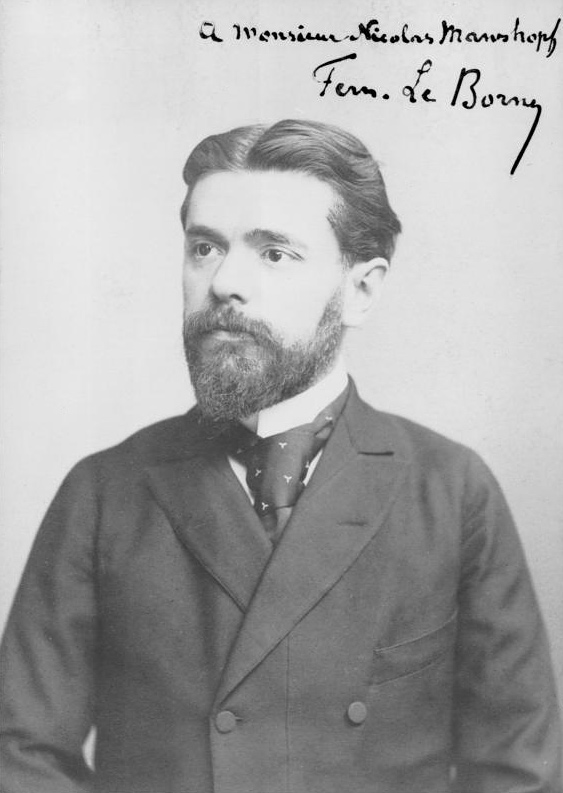
- French composer Fernand Le Borne (1862—1929); picture signed for Friedrich Nicolas Manskopf

Background information
- Born: 10 March 1862
- Died: 15 February 1929
- Genres: opera and classical

Fernand Le Borne (10 March 1862-15 February 1929) was a Belgian-French composer, conductor and music critic.
