= Marta of the Lowlands =

1914 film

- Directed by: J. Searle Dawley
- Screenplay by: Àngel Guimerà
- Produced by: Daniel Frohman
- Starring: Bertha Kalich; Wellington A. Playter; Hal Clarendon; Frank Holland; Lillian Kalich
- Cinematography: H. Lyman Broening
- Production company: Famous Players Film Company
- Distributed by: Paramount Pictures
- Release date: October 5, 1914
- Running time: 5 reels
- Country: United States
- Language: Silent..English titles

Marta of the Lowlands is a 1914 American drama film directed by J. Searle Dawley and written by Àngel Guimerà. The film stars Bertha Kalich, Wellington A. Playter, Hal Clarendon, Frank Holland and Lillian Kalich. The film was released on October 5, 1914, by Paramount Pictures.

== Cast ==
- Bertha Kalich as Marta
- Wellington A. Playter as Manelich (as Wellington Playter)
- Hal Clarendon as Sebastien
- Frank Holland as Sebastien's Servant
- Lillian Kalich as Muri
- George Moss as Villager

== Preservation status ==
- The film is now considered lost.
