= Gisa Geert =

Austrian actress and choreographer

Gisa Geert, stage name of Margarita Gross (Vienna, 7 June 1900 – Madrid, 2 April 1991), was an Austrian actress and choreographer, who was very active in Italy from the 1940s to the 1960s.

== Biography ==
Geert had been a member of the 'Bodenwieser Ensemble', founded under dancer Gertrud Bodenwieser.

At the turn of the Second World War she had choreographed many performances of the revue theatre, working among others with companies and Totò and Erminio Macario, before moving to the more modern musical comedy and vaudeville Garinei e Giovanni. By virtue of the severity with which she operated she earned the nickname the career of the iron lady.

She has been appreciated for her beauty and her ideas. Remembered for the last review of Totò – There you eat! – staged in the season of 1949-1950. On that occasion, one of the choreographic pictures involved were chess pieces with living pawns, or with the dancers depicting the capital in a play against labour; in the end there were illuminated fountains with squirted jets of water up to five metres high.

On television, she filmed the choreography for several programs in the 1960s, including the first season of The Friend of the Jaguar, led by Corrado Mantoni.

For Spanish television she was a guest star in the Galas del sábado, which aired in the season of 1969-1970.

For cinema she produced the choreography for period films, speaking on a couple of occasions as a performer.

== Choreography ==
=== Theatre ===
- C'era una volta il mondo (1947-1948)
- Bada che ti mangio! (1949-1950)
- Oh quante belle figlie madama Doré (1955-1956) – text by Italo Terzoli and Walter Chiari, with the same Chiari and Carlo Campanini with Bice Valori.
- A prescindere (1956-1957)
- Masanello, Bruno Corbucci and Aldo Grimaldi, with Nino Taranto, Macario and Miranda Martino.
- La voce dei padroni (1966-1967) – texts by Faele - Castaldo, show by Garinei e Giovanni, with Alighiero Noschese.

=== Television ===
- Il Mattatore (1959)
- L'amico del giaguaro (1961)
- Scaramouche (1965)
- Non cantare, spara (1968)
- Fantastico (1979)

=== Cinema ===
- Cintura di castità (On My Way to the Crusades, I Met a Girl Who...) (1950)
- Attila (1954)
- A sud niente di nuovo (1957)
- Le fatiche di Ercole (The Labours of Hercules) (1958)

== Filmography ==
- A sud niente di nuovo (1957)
- Menage all'italiana (1965)
