= Pau Audouard =

Spanish photographer (1857–1918)

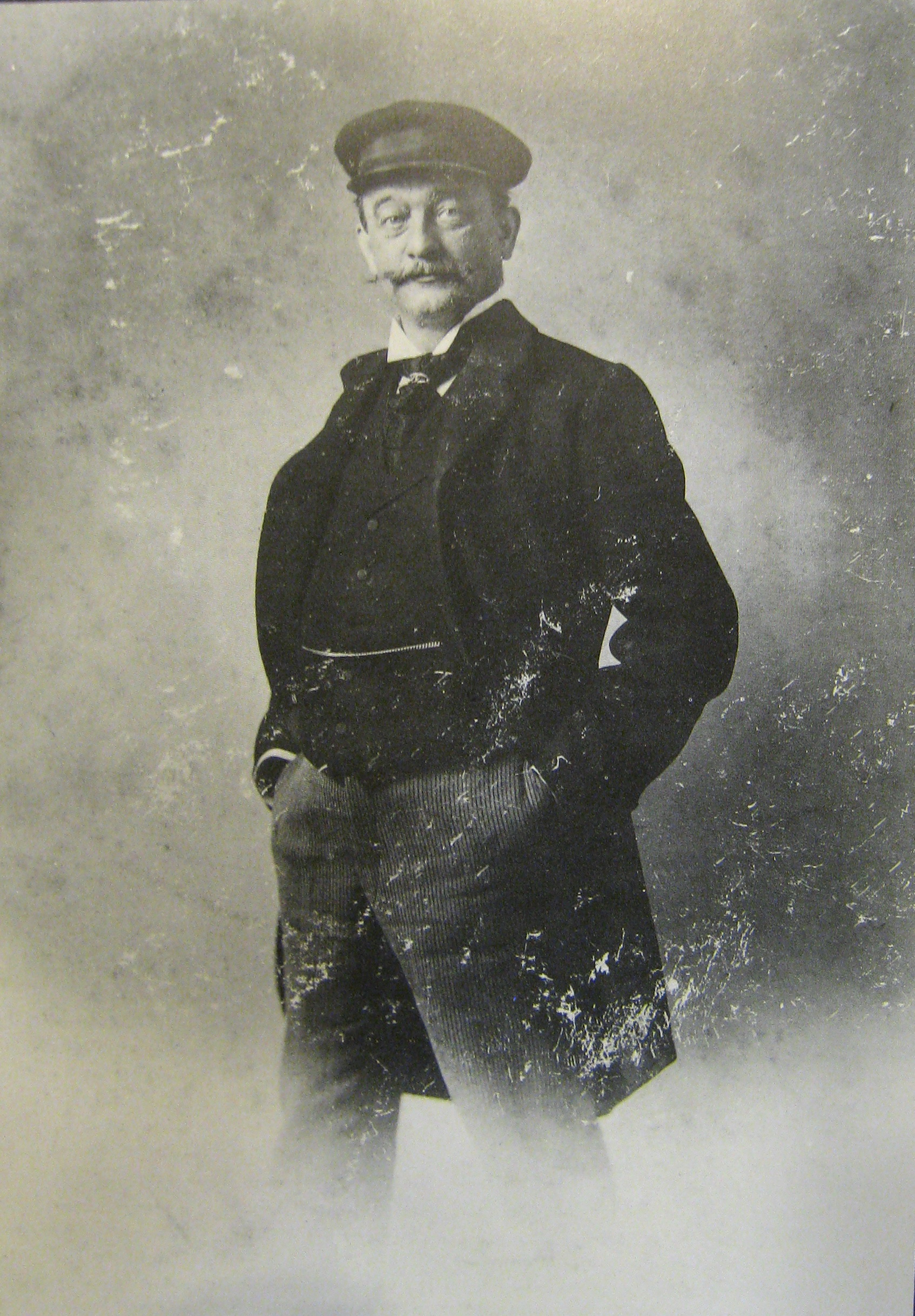
- Pau Audouard, self-portrait
- Born: 1857; Havana, Captaincy General of Cuba, Spanish Empire
- Died: 1918 (aged 60–61)
- Occupation: Photographer
- Organization: Société française de photographie (1879–1894)

Pau Audouard (1857–1918) was a photographer active in Barcelona, Catalonia, Spain at the end of the 19th century who became one of Spain’s most significant photographers during his era.

== Life and work ==
Adouard was born in Havana, Cuba. He moved with his family to Barcelona in 1879, where he opened a studio. He became one of the most important photographers in Spain in the late 19th century, winning two gold medals for his work from the Real Sociedad Económica Aragonesa in 1886. Two years later, he was appointed official photographer of the 1888 Barcelona World's Fair. Adouard was a member of the French Société française de photographie from 1879 to 1894. From 1905 to 1915, he lived and worked in the Casa Lleó Morera, built by architect Lluís Domènech i Montaner.
