= Dennis C. Rasmussen =

American professor and author (born 1978)

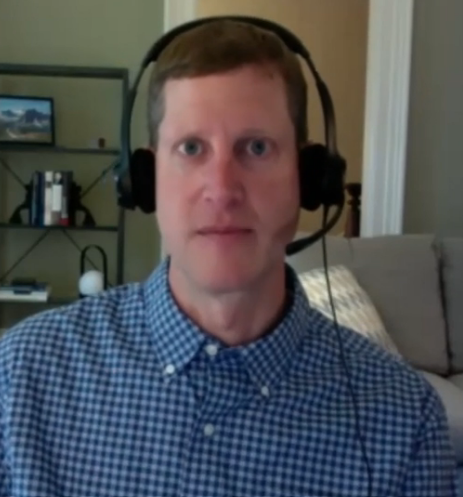
- Rasmussen in 2021
- Born: May 15, 1978 (age 48); St. Louis, Missouri
- Education: Duke University
- Occupation: Professor
- Employer: Syracuse University
- Website: https://www.dennis-rasmussen.com/

Dennis Carl Rasmussen (born 15 May 1978) is an American political scientist and author who currently serves as the co-director of Syracuse University's Political Philosophy Program as well as a professor of political science. He is also a senior research associate in Syracuse University's Campbell Public Affairs Institute.

Rasmussen was born in St. Louis, Missouri, and grew up in Lansing, Michigan. He received his Ph.D. in political science from Duke University in 2005 after obtaining his bachelor's from Michigan State University. From 2005 to 2009, he held various positions with Bowdoin College, Brown University, and the University of Houston before joining Tufts University's faculty in 2009 as an assistant professor. By the time he left Tufts for Syracuse University in 2019, he had become a professor and the chair of Tufts' Department of Political Science. In 2023, Rasmussen became the first recipient of the Hagerty Family Faculty Fellowship, which entitled Rasmussen to an endowment of $1 million.

Rasmussen lives in Cazenovia, New York, with his wife Emily and his son Sam.

== Books ==
- The Problems and Promise of Commercial Society: Adam Smith's Response to Rousseau (2008). Pennsylvania State University Press. This book was an honorable mention for the Delba Winthrop Award.
- The Pragmatic Enlightenment: Recovering the Liberalism of Hume, Smith, Montesquieu, and Voltaire (2014). Cambridge University Press.
- The Infidel and the Professor: David Hume, Adam Smith, and the Friendship That Shaped Modern Thought (2017). Princeton University Press. This book was shortlisted for the Ralph Waldo Emerson Award and listed on various publications' annual best books lists.
- Adam Smith and the Death of David Hume: The Letter to Strahan and Related Texts (2018). Lexington Books.
- Fears of a Setting Sun: The Disillusionment of America's Founders (2021). Princeton University Press. This book was named one of the Wall Street Journal's best political books for that year.
- The Constitution's Penman: Gouverneur Morris and the Creation of America's Basic Charter (2023).University Press of Kansas. This book was a runner-up for Journal of the American Revolution's Book of the Year Award.
- Frederick Douglass's American Founding: How the Nation's Fiercest Critic Embraced the Constitution (2026). Princeton University Press.
