= Rasmussen Lowlands =

- Interactive map of Rasmussen Lowlands
- Coordinates: 68°40′N 093°00′W
- Area: 3,000 km^{2} (1,200 sq mi)

Ramsar Wetland
- Designated: 24 May 1982
- Reference no.: 247

The Rasmussen Lowlands is a 3,000 km^{2} coastal plain complex of wetlands in the Kitikmeot Region, Nunavut, Canada. It was designated a Ramsar wetland of international importance by the Ramsar Convention on May 24, 1982. It is also classified as an Important Bird Area.

The poorly drained area consists of flat lowlands overlain by marine silts and sand, with numerous tundra ponds throughout.

Shorebirds numbering up to 500,000 individuals nest in the ponds and surrounding areas. The vulnerable peregrine falcon nests in the adjacent escarpment, with nearly 6% (80 pairs) of the national population observed here in 1995.
