= Friedrich Rosenthal =

Austrian director and playwright

Friedrich Rosenthal (20 July 1885 in Vienna – 21 August 1942 at the Auschwitz concentration camp) was an Austrian director and playwright.

== Life and work ==
Rosenthal was a theatre historian, playwright and director. He worked both for the theatre and for silent film. From 1910 to 1912 he worked as a playwright at the National Theatre in Mannheim, and was obliged to work from 1913–1929 as a playwright and director at the Volktheater in Vienna. There he staged particularly German classics and folk pieces. In 1920 he founded the first national touring company in Austria. From 1927 to 1931 he was a lecturer of history of the performing arts at the University of Music and Performing Arts, Vienna. From 1932 he was engaged as a playwright, artistic secretary and director at the Burgtheater. There he led and directed in 26 new productions. In 1938, after the annexation of Austria, he fled to France, where he was arrested after the invasion of German troops by the Gestapo and eventually deported to Auschwitz and murdered.

Rosenthal was married in 1920 to the dancer Gertrud Bodenwieser, who was able to escape with some of her students to Colombia and later settled in Australia. She survived the time of National Socialism.

== Film ==
- 1918: So fallen die Lose des Lebens
