= Tiefland (opera) =

Opera by Eugen d'Albert

- Opera by Eugen d'Albert
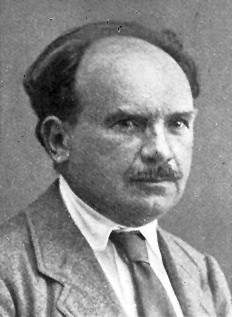
- Eugen d'Albert in 1904
- Translation: The Lowlands
- Librettist: Rudolf Lothar
- Language: German
- Based on: Terra baixa by Àngel Guimerà
- Premiere: 15 November 1903; Neues Deutsches Theater in Prague

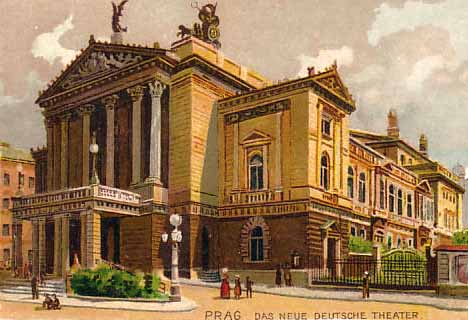
Neues Deutsches Theater in Prague

Tiefland (The Lowlands) is an opera in a prologue and two acts by Eugen d'Albert, to a libretto in German by Rudolf Lothar. Based on the 1896 Catalan play Terra baixa by Àngel Guimerà, Tiefland was d'Albert's seventh opera, and is the one which is now the best known.

== Performance history ==
Tiefland was first performed on 15 November 1903 at the Neues Deutsches Theater in Prague, with only limited success. Part of the reason for the lukewarm reception may have been because the house's leading dramatic tenor, Wilhelm Elsner, had died suddenly not too long before the opera's premiere, forcing another singer to learn and perform the role of Pedro in a relatively short amount of time.

For its next performance, Tiefland was revised by D'Albert and revived in Hamburg and Berlin in 1907, where it played to long runs. Its American premiere took place at the Metropolitan Opera in New York on November 23, 1908 with Emmy Destinn and Erik Schmedes in the two leading roles.

The opera is fairly regularly performed in Germany and Austria, with recent new productions at the Hessisches Staatstheater Wiesbaden in April 2007, the Volksoper Wien in October 2007 and at Deutsche Oper Berlin, with Torsten Kerl as Pedro and Nadja Michael as Marta, in November 2007. Performances outside German speaking countries have tended to be more sporadic. Tiefland was performed in an English translation by Chicago's Civic Opera Company in December 1926. It was performed at the Ankara Opera House in 1951 in a production directed by Carl Ebert with Semiha Berksoy as Marta. It also received a major revival at Washington Opera in 1995 with its first major US production in 81 years, conducted by Heinz Fricke and directed by Roman Terleckyj. The Sarasota Opera performed the opera five times in March 2018.

In addition to Schmedes and Destinn, notable past performers have included: Kirsten Flagstad, who made her stage debut in 1913 at the age of 18 singing the role of Nuri at the National Theater in Oslo; the young Maria Callas, who sang the role of Marta at the Olympia Theatre in Athens during the 1943/1944 season and again the following season; Montserrat Caballé who, like Callas, sang Marta early in her career; and the Danish tenor, Vilhelm Herold who was considered by d'Albert to have been the ideal Pedro. Richard Tauber first performed the role at Dresden in 1918, and recorded the two principal arias in 1928. It remained a favourite role, which he performed widely until 1940 in Switzerland.

The best-known film adaptation of the opera was by the German director Leni Riefenstahl, with Riefenstahl herself playing Marta. The film, begun in 1940, but not released until 1954, used Roma slave labor from a German transportation camp for some of the extras, many of whom were sent to Auschwitz before the end of the war.

== Principal roles ==
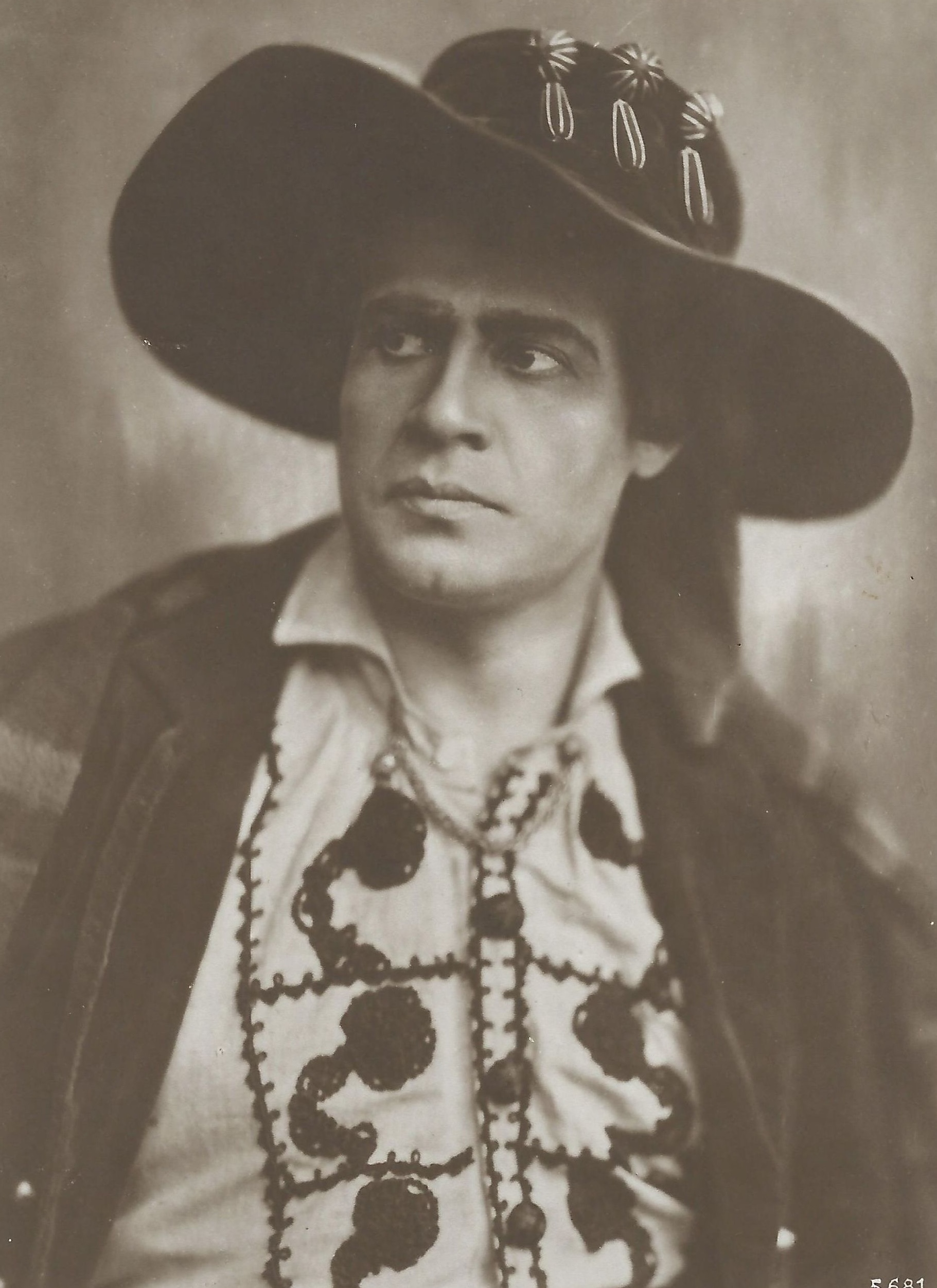
Baritone Joseph Schwarz as Sebastiano in Tiefland. (c. 1916)

Roles, voice types, premiere cast
Role	Voice type	Premiere cast 15 November 1903 Conductor: Leo Blech
Marta, a servant and ward of Sebastiano, loved by both Sebastiano and Pedro	soprano	Irene Alföldy
Pedro, a shepherd in Sebastiano's service	tenor	Desider Arányi
Sebastiano, a rich landowner	baritone	Erich Hunold
Tommaso, an elderly man in the district	bass	Alexander Haydter
Nuri, a servant of Sebastiano and Marta's friend	soprano	Gertrude Förstel
Pepa, a servant of Sebastiano	soprano	Martha Frank-Blech
Antonia, a servant of Sebastiano	mezzo-soprano	Elsa Reich
Rosalia, a servant of Sebastiano	contralto	Lina Carmasini
Moruccio, a miller in Sebastiano's service	bass	Mathieu Frank
Nando, a shepherd in Sebastiano's service	tenor	Josef Pauli

== Synopsis ==
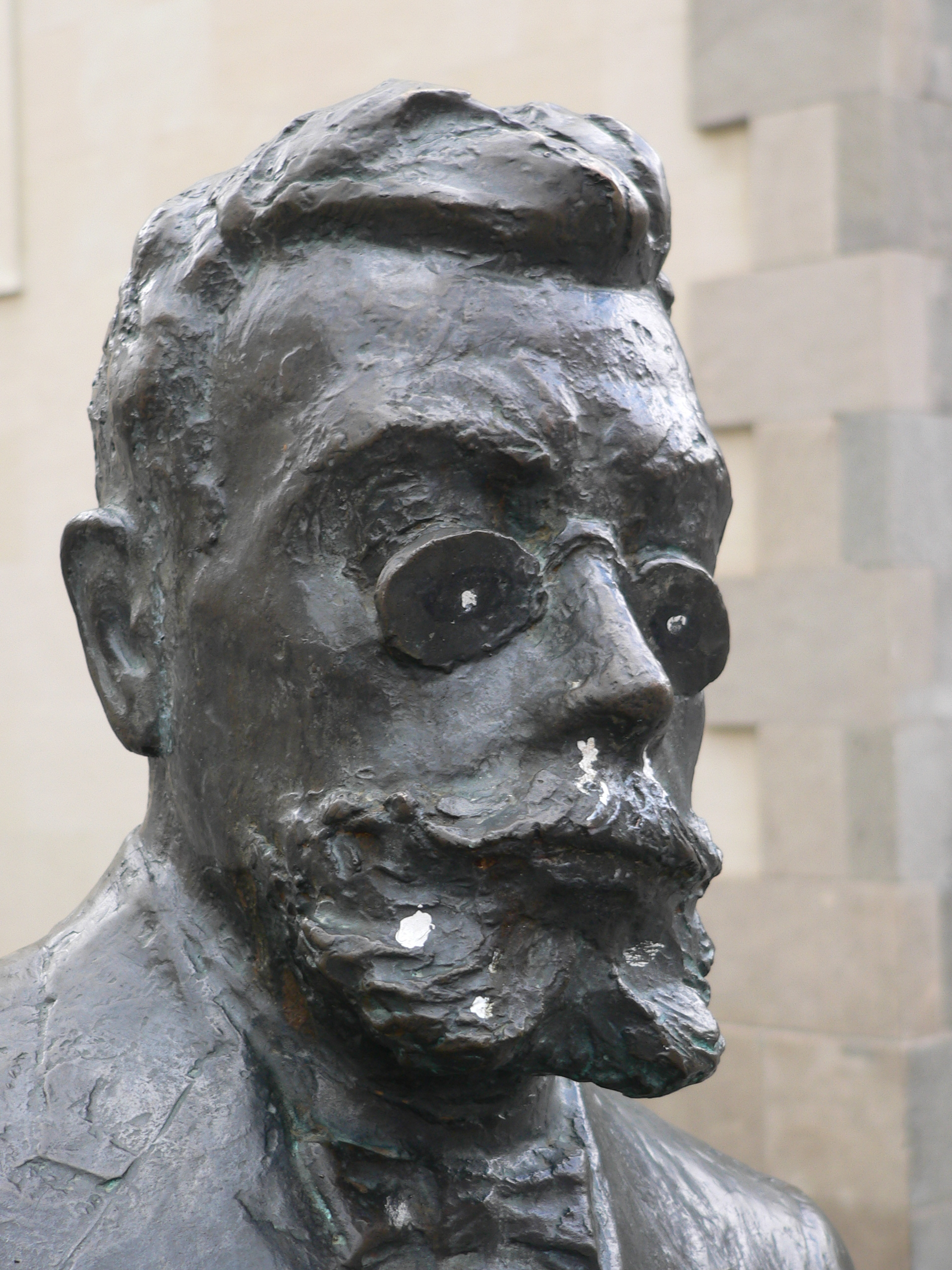
Àngel Guimerà, author of the play that inspired the librettist

Before the opera begins: Years earlier, Marta, the daughter of a strolling player, had been induced to live with Sebastiano, a wealthy landowner in exchange for the gift of a mill to her father. Sebastiano is about to marry a wealthy heiress. In order to keep his mistress, Marta, nearby and continue their affair, he plans to have her marry Pedro (in Güimerà's original play, his name is Manelic), one of his shepherds.

Prologue

The Pyrenees Mountains. Pedro meets Nando, and tells him that he has dreamed of meeting a beautiful woman who will be his wife. Sebastiano, accompanied by Tommaso, brings Marta to Pedro and informs him that he must come down to the Lowlands to marry her and to become the miller. Marta is reluctant to even look at Pedro.

Act 1

The interior of the village mill. Moruccio and the servants gossip about Marta, the girls hinting that Moruccio hoped to marry Marta himself. Nuri reveals that Marta is to be married to a shepherd and reveals that she has overheard a conversation between Sebastiano and Marta which she did not understand, but which the others clearly comprehend reveals their relationship. Pedro arrives at the mill, where his marriage is to take place. Not knowing that Marta is actually Sebastiano's mistress, he is puzzled as to why the villagers are making fun of him. Moruccio reveals the background to Tommaso, who is angered and seeks to confront Sebastiano. The confrontation in which Tomasso is backed by Moruccio leads to Moruccio's dismissal. After the wedding, Marta, who fears that Sebastiano will carry out his intention of coming to her that night, does not go to her chamber nor accompanies Pedro, which puzzles him even more.

Act 2

The interior of the village mill. Marta is now beginning to fall in love with Pedro. However, unable to stand the teasing and persecution of the villagers, he tells her he is going back to the mountains. She begs him to take her with him and tells him the truth about her and Sebastiano. In a jealous rage, Pedro advances towards her with a knife, but, overcome by remorse and his love for her, decides to take her with him. Sebastiano enters with the villagers and makes advances to Marta. Pedro furiously objects and is dragged outside.

Act 3

The interior of the village mill. Sebastiano has been rejected by the heiress whom he had hoped to marry and again makes advances to Marta. She calls Pedro for help. He rushes at Sebastiano with a knife, but seeing that he is unarmed, throws the knife down and strangles him. Carrying Marta in his arms, Pedro exclaims to the villagers: "Far up, far up in the mountains! To sunshine and freedom and light." He and Marta escape to the mountains.

== Notable recordings ==
1952 F. Charles Adler, Vienna Symphony Orchestra (Paperback Opera 20022)

- Marta: Margarita Kenney
- Pedro: Waldemar Kmentt
- Sebastiano: Otto Wiener
- Tommaso: Leo Heppe

1957 Rudolf Moralt, Wiener Symphoniker (Philips 434 781-2)

- Marta: Gré Brouwenstijn
- Pedro: Hans Hopf
- Sebastiano: Paul Schöffler
- Tommaso: Oskar Czerwenka

1963 Paul Schmitz, Staatskapelle Dresden

- Marta: Hanne-Lore Kuhse
- Pedro: Heinz Hoppe
- Sebastiano: Siegfried Vogel
- Tommaso: Theo Adam

1963 Hans Zanotelli, Berliner Symphoniker A video was also made.

- Marta: Isabel Strauss
- Pedro: Rudolf Schock
- Sebastiano: Gerd Feldhoff
- Tommaso: Ivan Sardi

1983 Marek Janowski, Münchner Rundfunkorchester (ARTS 47501-2)

- Marta: Éva Marton
- Pedro: René Kollo
- Sebastiano: Bernd Weikl
- Tommaso: Kurt Moll

2002 Bertrand de Billy, Vienna Radio Symphony Orchestra (Oehms OC 312)

- Marta: Lisa Gasteen
- Pedro: Johan Botha
- Sebastiano: Falk Struckmann
- Tommaso: Kwangchul Youn

2006 Franz Welser-Möst, Orchester der Oper Zürich (EMI DVD, video-recorded at performances in July)

- Marta: Petra-Maria Schnitzer
- Pedro: Peter Seiffert
- Sebastiano: Matthias Goerne
- Tommaso: László Polgár
