= List of operas by Eugen d'Albert =

This is a list of operas by Eugen d'Albert (1864–1932).

== List ==
Title	Genre	Subdivisions	Libretto	Première date	Place, theatre
Der Rubin	musikalisches Märchen	2 acts	d’Albert, after Friedrich Hebbel	12 October 1893	Karlsruhe, Hoftheater
Ghismonda	Oper	3 acts	d’Albert, after Karl Immermann Die Opfer des Schweigens	28 November 1895	Dresden, Hoftheater
Gernot	Oper	3 acts	d’Albert, after Gustav Kastropp	11 April 1897	Mannheim, Hoftheater
Die Abreise	Musikalisches Lustspiel	1 act	Ferdinand Graf von Sporck, after August Ernst von Steigentesch	28 October 1898	Frankfurt, Opernhaus
Kain	musikalisches Tragödie	1 act	Heinrich Bulthaupt	17 February 1900	Berlin, Königliches Opernhaus
Der Improvisator	Oper	3 acts	Gustav Kastropp, after Victor Hugo Angelo, der Tyrann von Padua	26 February 1902	Berlin, Königliches Opernhaus
Tiefland	Musikdrama	prologue and 2 acts	Rudolf Lothar, after Àngel Guimerà Terra baixa	15 November 1903	Prague, Neues Deutsches Theater
Flauto solo	musikalisches Lustspiel	1 act	Hans von Wolzogen	12 November 1905	Prague, Neues Deutsches Theater
Tragaldabas, der geborgte Ehemann	komische Oper	3 acts	Rudolf Lothar, after Auguste Vacquérie	3 December 1907	Hamburg, Stadttheater
Izëyl	Musikdrama	3 acts	Rudolf Lothar, after Paul Armand Silvestre and Eugène Morand	6 November 1909	Hamburg, Stadttheater
Die verschenkte Frau	komische Oper	3 acts	Rudolf Lothar, after E. Antony	6 February 1912	Vienna, Hofoper
Liebesketten; Full score	Oper	3 acts	Rudolf Lothar after Àngel Guimerà La filla del mar	12 November 1912, revised version 8 March 1918	Vienna, Volksoper; Berlin, Deutsches Opernhaus
Die toten Augen; Vocal score	Bühnendichtung	prologue and 1 act	Hanns Heinz Ewers and Marc Henry, after Marc Henry Les yeux morts. Composed 1912/13	5 March 1916	Dresden, Hofoper.
Der Stier von Olivera	Oper	3 acts	Richard Batka, after Heinrich Lilienfein	10 March 1918	Leipzig, Stadttheater
Revolutions Hochzeit	Oper	3 acts	Ferdinand Lion, after Sophus Michaëlis	26 October 1919	Leipzig, Neues Stadttheater
Scirocco	Oper	3 acts	Karl Michael von Levetzow and Leo Feld	16 May 1921	Darmstadt, Landestheater
Mareike von Nymwegen	Legendenspiel	3 acts	Herbert Alberti, based on Mariken van Nieumeghen	31 October 1923	Hamburg, Stadttheater
Der Golem	Musikdrama	3 acts	Ferdinand Lion, after Arthur Holitscher	14 December 1926	Frankfurt, Opernhaus
Die schwarze Orchidee	Opera grottesca	3 acts	Karl Michael von Levetzow	1 December 1928	Leipzig, Neues Theater
Die Witwe von Ephesos	Oper	3 acts	Karl Michael von Levetzow	not performed	
Mister Wu (completed by Leo Blech)	Oper	3 acts	Karl Michael von Levetzow, after Harry M. Vernon and Harold Owen	29 September 1932	Dresden, Staatsoper
