= Auguste Götze =

German actress, singer, and playwright (1840–1908)

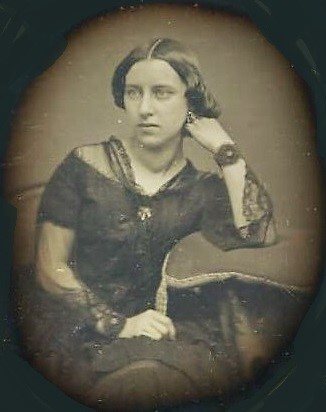
- Auguste Götze c.1860
- Born: Ida Augusta Götze; 24 February 1840; Weimar, German Confederation
- Died: 29 April 1908 (aged 68); Leipzig, German Empire
- Other names: A. Weimar
- Occupations: Classical singer (contralto); Vocal pedagogue; Playwright

Auguste Götze (or Goetze; 24 February 1840 – 29 April 1908) was a German classical singer, actress, playwright, and a distinguished voice teacher. Götze was born in Weimar where she initially trained in music with her father, the tenor Franz Götze. In her later years, she had her own singing school in Leipzig as well as teaching in the conservatory there. She died in Leipzig at the age of 68 after several years of increasingly poor health.

== Life and career ==
Götze was born in Weimar to Franz Götze (1814–1888) and Karoline Götze née Müller (1812–1847). Her father had begun his musical career as a violinist with the Weimar court orchestra and later became a tenor opera singer who sang in the first Weimar performances of Wagner's operas Tannhäuser and Lohengrin. Her mother, a former opera singer and actress, had been paralyzed and bedridden for much of Götze's childhood and died when she was seven years old. She was initially educated at a local school in Weimar but also received intensive lessons from her father in piano and singing. In 1853 Götze moved to Leipzig with her father when he was appointed a singing professor at the Leipzig Conservatory. Her father's friend, Franz Liszt, greatly admired her singing and encouraged her to pursue an artistic career. When she made her debuts as a concert singer in 1860 in Weimar and Jena, Liszt himself accompanied her on the piano. She was described by contemporaries as having a well-balanced contralto voice of rare depth and charm.

By 1861, her intense training had taken a toll on her voice, and for a time Götze turned to acting instead. She made her debut as an actress in the Weimar Court Theater in Karl von Holtei's Lenore. After her vocal health was restored in the mid-1860s, she resumed an active career as a concert and lieder singer. She made a conscious decision not to sing again on the opera stage, a decision which her friend Ida Marie Lipsius said suited her "reserved nature." A highly regarded interpreter of the songs of Schumann, Liszt, and Mendelssohn, she made concert tours to Germany, Switzerland, England, and the Netherlands. After 1873 Götze's concert performances became much less frequent as she began giving private singing lessons and took up a position as a teacher at the Dresden Conservatory. In 1875 she also opened her own singing and opera school in Dresden. Her former pupil, Molly von Kotzebue, (Note: Molly von Kotzebue (1848–1932) was born in Reval (at the time part of the Russian Empire). She was the daughter of General George von Kotzebue and the granddaughter of the dramatist and writer August von Kotzebue. In 1889, she published Lehrbuch der Gesangskunst, a textbook with vocal exercises summarising the teaching approach of the Götze-Kotzebueschen singing school.) joined her school as a teacher in 1885 after which it became known as the "Götze-Kotzebueschen-Schule".

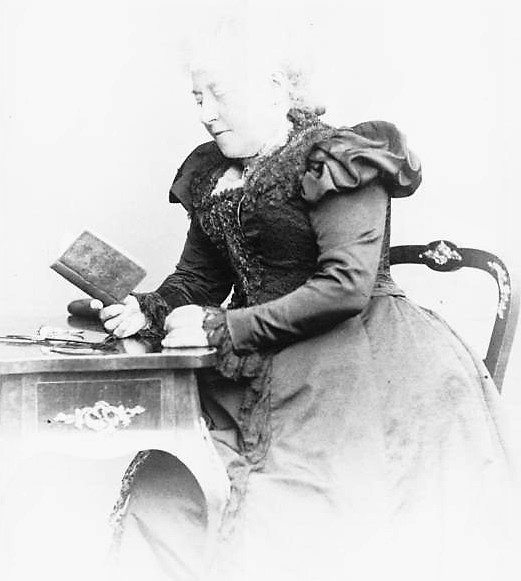
Götze in her later years

In the autumn of 1889, Götze moved her school to Leipzig while Molly von Kotzebue remained in Dresden and went her own way as a singing teacher. Götze's father Franz had died in Leipzig in 1888 after a career of over thirty years as a legendary singing professor at the conservatory, providing her with an entrée into the musical world of the city. Her new singing school's public examinations and soirées soon became social events. One of the highlights was a celebration of Franz Liszt on 4 June 1902 where her students performed two musical melodramas composed by Liszt especially for her. During her time in Leipzig she published several revised versions of vocal exercises by earlier vocal pedagogues, such as Peter von Winter and Giuseppe Concone, as well as collections of her own exercises. Her much-discussed article "Über den Verfall der Gesangkunst" ("On the decline of the art of singing") was published in Neue Zeitschrift für Musik in 1875. In it she summarized her teaching principles and lamented the tendency of talented young singers to rush into stage careers before they had put in the necessary years study and apprenticeship.

In the later years of her life Götze continued giving private singing lessons and writing as long as her health permitted. However, her health gradually deteriorated and she died at the age of 68 after "severe suffering". She was buried in the Neuer Johannisfriedhof cemetery in Leipzig. During her last years she was cared for by her confidante, Selma Deckner, who also helped her financially. After Götze's death Deckner gave a large collection of her papers and photographs to the Leipzig History Museum.

== Writings ==
Although Götze was primarily known for her work as a singer and vocal pedagogue, she also had a parallel career as a writer. Her interest in writing had begun when she was eight years old and wrote a short play entitled Esther oder die Liebe zum Volke (Esther or the Love of the People). She performed it at her father's house before an enthusiastically applauding Franz Liszt. Later as a student in Leipzig she began writing reviews of the concerts that she had attended and some short plays. According to her close friend Ida Marie Lipsius, it was "as if a secret train pulled the child's soul to poetry" and provided a balance to her intense musical training.

Her later writing included music criticism and essays for journals such as Signale für die musikalische Welt, Deutsche Gesangskunst, and Neue Musik-Zeitung and an outspoken reply to Schopenhauer's views on music. She also wrote a number of plays (some under the pseudonym "A. Weimar") which were successfully performed on German and Austrian stages. Her first major success as a playwright was her five-act tragedy Susanne Mountfort based on the life of the English actress Susanna Mountfort. According to a contemporary account in The Athenaeum, its premiere in Dresden was a great success with the actors and the playwright receiving numerous curtain calls. One of her last works was a completion of Schiller's unfinished fragment Demetrius. Götze's version of Demetrius premiered in 1893 in Weimar and was later performed in Dresden and Leipzig.

Götze's dramatic works included: (Note: Dates in parentheses refer to date of first publication)

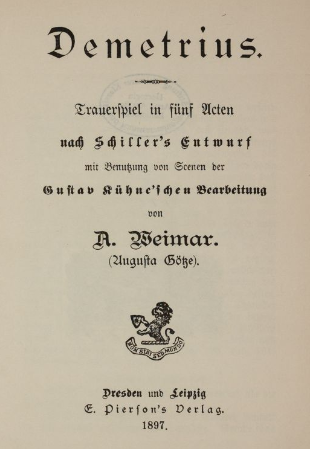
Title page of Götze's play Demetrius

- Susanne Mountfort, tragedy in five acts, premiered Dresden 5 February 1871 (1871)
- Vittoria Accoramboni, tragedy in five acts (1875)
- Eine Heimfahrt, drama in four acts, (1879)
- Magdalena drama in four acts (1880)
- Eine Diplomatin, comedy in four acts, premiered Hamburg (1880)
- Nur kein Blaustrumpf, comedy in one act (1881)
- Hohe Liebe, drama in four acts (1884)
- Gräfin Osmon, drama, premiered Dresden (1884)
- Die weiße Frau, comedy (1884)
- Wera, comedy, premiered Berlin (1884)
- Zwei Mal Christnacht, dramatic fairy tale in eight scenes (1886)
- Schloß Raveneck, drama (1886)
- Alpenstürme, drama in one act, premiered Hamburg (1886)
- Im Bann auf Helgoland, drama (1893)
- Isolde, drama in five acts (1995)
- Demetrius, tragedy in five acts, premiered Weimar 1893 (1897)

== Students ==
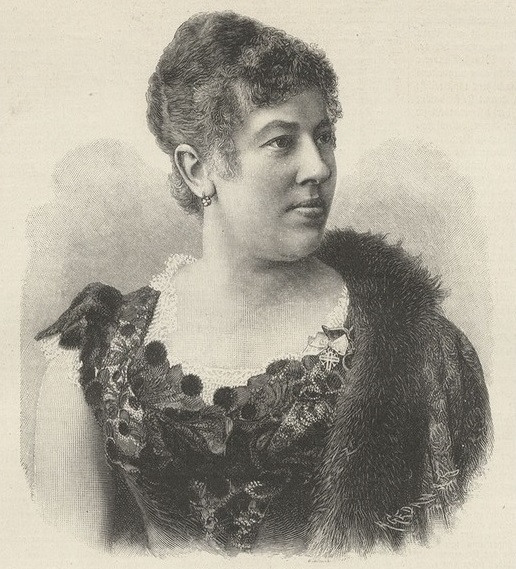
Fanny Moran-Olden, one of Götze's Dresden students

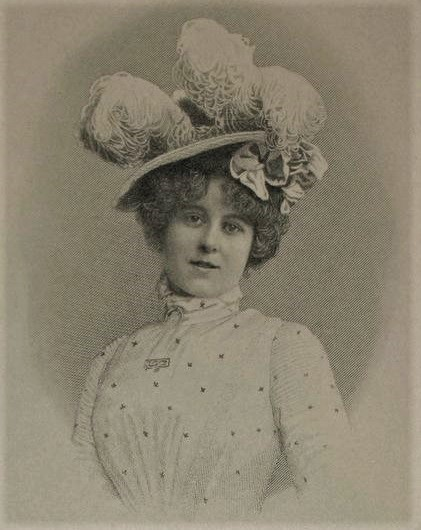
Ada Colley, one of Götze's Leipzig students

Opera and concert singers trained by Götze included:

- Anna Beck-Radecke (1861–1918) was a German contralto primarily active on the stages of Cologne and later a singing teacher. She was born in Osnabrück and died in Berlin.
- Ada Colley (1872–1947) was an Australian light soprano active in the music halls of Australia and Great Britain and variously dubbed the "Sydney Skylark" and the "Australian Nightingale". She was born in Parramatta and died in London.
- Hermine Finck (1872–1932) was a German soprano who created the role of The Witch in Hansel and Gretel and became the third of composer Eugen d'Albert's six wives. She was born in Baden-Baden and died in Berlin where she taught singing in her later years.
- Mary Howe (1870–1952) was an American soprano active in the opera houses of Germany in the late 1880s and later a concert singer in the United States. She was born in Brattleboro, Vermont and died in South Lancaster, Massachusetts
- Fanny Moran-Olden (1855–1905) was a German soprano prominent in the Wagnerian repertoire and possessing an unusually wide vocal range that extended down to contralto. She was born in Cloppenburg and died near Berlin in a hospital for the insane.
- Lucie Krall (dates of birth and death unknown) was a German coloratura soprano active in operetta and concerts in Germany at the turn of the 20th century. She began her career when she was very young in concerts which caused a sensation because of her exceptionally high vocal range. She had the ability to reach notes an octave higher than the normal soprano range.
- Adrienne Osborne (1873–1951) was an American contralto who made her career entirely in Germany and became a Royal Kammersängerin in Munich. She was born in Buffalo, New York and died in Zell am Ziller, Austria.
- Clara Polscher (dates of birth and death unknown) was a German mezzo-soprano concert singer active in the 1890s in Germany and northern Europe and associated with the work of Gustav Mahler. She was born in Leipzig.
- Luise Reuther (1856–1935) was a German soprano and Kammersängerin of the Dresden Opera particularly noted for her Wagnerian roles. She was born in Budapest and died in Dresden.
- Antoinette Ries (1875–after 1913) was a German soprano who specialised in soubrette roles and sang in several opera houses in Germany as well as the Deutsches Theater in Cincinnati, Ohio.
- Anna Smith Behrens (1857–1906) was a Norwegian soprano who later emigrated to the United States where she made her concert debut in Chicago's Central Music Hall in 1888. Possessed of a high crystalline voice, she introduced Americans to the songs of her native country and for the last 10 years of her life was a prominent singing teacher in Minneapolis, Minnesota. She was born in Oslo and died in Minneapolis.
