= Felix Woyrsch =

German composer and choir director (1860–1944)

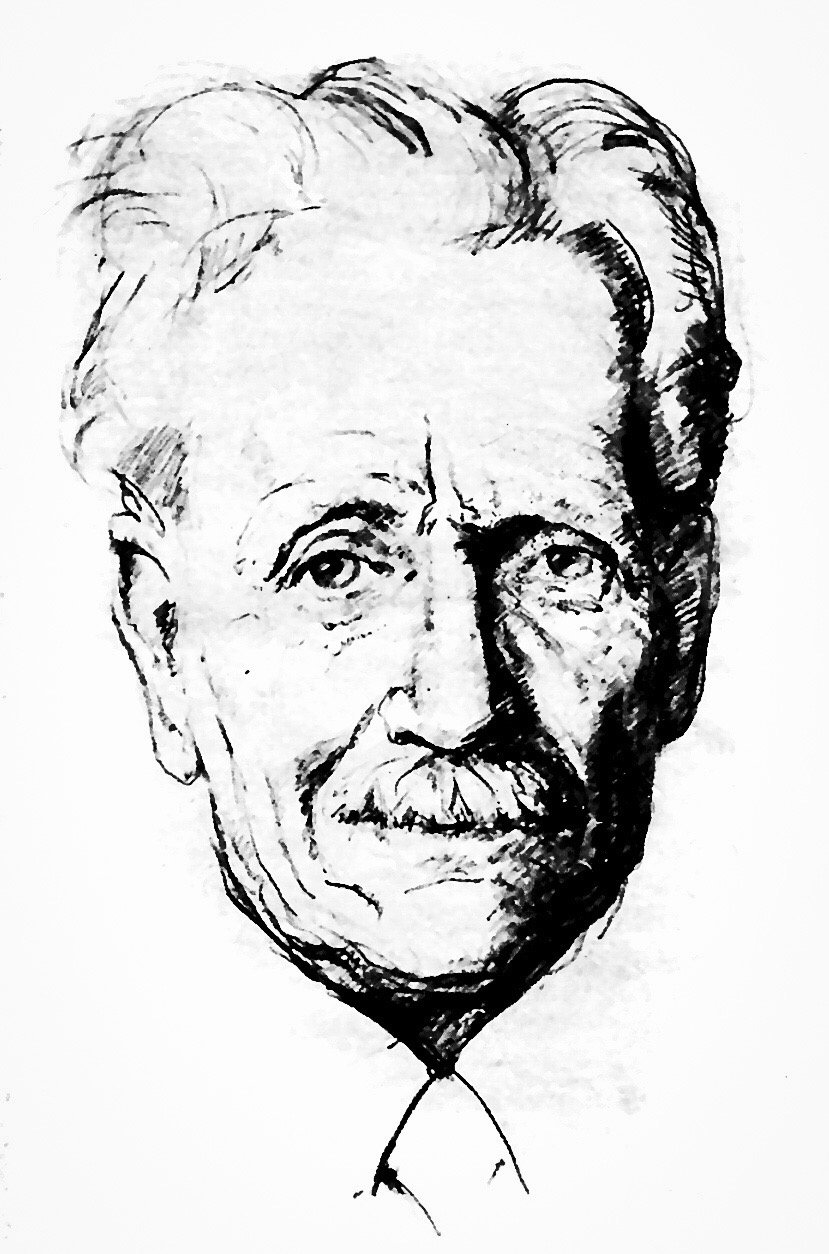
Felix Woyrsch

Felix Woyrsch (8 October 1860 – 20 March 1944) was a German composer and choir director.

== Life ==
Woyrsch was born in Troppau, just over the Prussian border in Austrian Silesia (now Opava in the Czech Republic). He was raised in Dresden and later Altona, a suburb of Hamburg, in a lower middle class family of limited means. Largely self-taught in music, he did study for some time with Ernst August Heinrich Chevallier.

He became director of the "Altonaer Liedertafel" in 1887 and director of the Altona Church Choir in 1893. In 1895, he took over the direction of the Altona "Singakademie", and became organist at the Friedenskirche and then at the Johanniskirche. From 1903, he created municipal symphonic and folk music concerts.

Already a music professor since 1901, he was elected into the Prussian Academy of Arts in Berlin in 1917. He worked as a conductor and as Altona's city music director until 1931. In 1936, he was given the Goethe Medal, followed by the Beethoven Prize in Berlin upon his retirement in 1937.

He died in Altona.

== Style and legacy ==
His main influences included his friend Brahms as well as Bach, Palestrina, Lassus, and Heinrich Schütz. Although Woyrsch quite valued the music of his contemporaries such as Stravinsky, Schoenberg and Hindemith, he felt less committed to musical innovation as a composer. Rather, he devoted himself to the development of a personal style in the classical-romantic tradition. After his death, he quickly fell into oblivion.

Woyrsch's compositions include seven symphonies, five further works for orchestra, three operas, 100 songs, and a violin concerto. His music was widely performed in Germany until 1933, with his oratorio works in particular receiving attention and recognition. Works of his were also performed in the USA, England, Netherlands and Russia. After the seizure of power by the national socialists, interest in his works began to wane.

The Pfohl-Woyrsch-Gesellschaft in Hamburg, founded in 1993, has set itself the goal of preserving the musical heritage of Felix Woyrsch and making it accessible to a wider public.

== Works ==
=== Operas ===
- Der Pfarrer von Meudon (The Priest of Meudon), Op. 20 (1886)
- Der Weiberkriege (Women at War), Op. 27 (1890)
- Wikingerfahrt (Journey of the Vikings) (1896)

=== Orchestral ===
- Symphony in B♭ minor, "Study Symphony" (1884)
- Symphonic Prologue to Dante's Divina commedia, for large orchestra, Op. 40 (1891)
- Skaldic Rhapsody (Saga of Heroes – Lamentation of the Dead – Coming Home), Violin Concerto in D minor, Op. 50 (1904)
- Symphony No. 1 in C minor, Op. 52 (1908)
- 3 Böcklin Phantasies (Die Toteninsel, Der Eremit, Im Spiel der Wellen), Op. 53 (1910)
- Overture to Shakespeare's Hamlet, Op. 56
- Symphony No. 2 in C major, Op. 60 (1914)
- Symphony No. 3 in E♭ minor, Op. 70 (1927)
- Symphony No. 4 in F major, Op. 71 (1930)
- Symphony No. 5 in D major, Op. 75 (1935)
- Theme and Variations, Op. 76
- Symphony No. 6 in C major, Sinfonia Sacra, Op. 77 (1939)

=== Chamber music ===
- Albumblatt for Violin and Piano, Op. 22
- String Quartet No. 1 in A minor, Op. 55 (1909)
- Mors triumphans!, quartet on the sacred folk song Es ist ein Schnitter, der heißt Tod, for four trombones, Op. 58
- String Quartet No. 2 in C minor, Op. 63 (1916)
- String Quartet No. 3 in E♭, Op. 64 (1918)
- Piano Trio in E minor, Op. 65 (1924)
- Piano Quintet in C minor, Op. 66 (1927)
- String Sextet in B♭, Op. 72 (1926)
- String Quartet No. 4 in B♭, Op. 74 (1926)
- String Quartet No. 5 in C minor, Op. 78 (1938–40)

=== Piano ===
- 3 Nocturnes, Op. 1
- 2 Waltzes, Op. 8
- Waltz in E♭ for Piano Four Hands, Op. 13
- Theme and Variations, Op. 17
- 4 Impromptus, Op. 23
- Improvisations for Piano, Op. 44
- Metamorphosen, Op. 48

=== Organ ===
- Festival Preludium on the Chorale Nun danket alle Gott, Op. 43
- 10 Chorale Chorale Preludes, Op. 59
- Passacaglia on the Dies irae, Op. 62

=== Vocal and choral ===
- 4 Lieder for Voice and Piano and Violin (or Cello), Op. 2 (Heine)
- 3 Lieder for Baritone and Piano, Op. 3 (1884)
- Schnitter Tod (Grim Reaper), old traditional German song, for male chorus, Op. 4
- Serenade for Tenor, Op. 5
- 3 Persian Songs for Baritone and Piano, Op. 6
- 2 Songs for Mixed Choir, Op. 7
- Wollt' er nur fragen (Jamie, Come Try Me), song for soprano and small orchestra, Op. 9 (Burns)
- 4 Songs for Mixed Chorus, Op. 10
- 2 Songs for Male Chorus, Op. 11
- Edwardian ballad, Dein Schwert, wie ist's von Blut so rot; Old Scottish ballad (from Percy's Reliques of Ancient English Poetry, translated Herder), for baritone and orchestra, Op. 12
- Spanisches Liederbuch for Voice and Piano, Op. 14
- 3 Lieder for Soprano and Piano, Op. 15
- 10 Rattenfängerlieder (Rat-Catcher Songs) for Baritone and Piano, Op. 16, 1886 (Wolff)
- Die Geburt Jesu, Christmas cantata with words from the Bible, for soloists, choir and orchestra, Op. 18 (1885)
- 4 Lieder for Male Chorus, Op. 19
- Wedding Motet 'Wo du hingehst, for mixed choir, Op. 21
- 3 Lieder for Male Chorus, Op. 24
- 4 Lieder for Mixed Choir, Op. 25
- Lieder, Op. 26
- 4 Men's Choruses (Pfau, Uhland, Kastropp), Op. 28
- Motet Sei getreu bis in den Tod, for mixed choir, Op. 29
- 3 Songs for Men's Voices, Op. 30
- 5 Lieder with piano, Op. 31
- Deutscher Heerbann, cantata for soloists, male-voice choir and orchestra, Op. 32
- Deutsche Volkslieder for mixed choir, Op. 33
- 6 Songs for Women's Chorus, Op. 34
- 2 Lieder for Voice and Piano, Op. 35
- 3 Songs for Male Chorus, Op. 36
- 2 Lieder for Men's Voices, Op. 37
- 3 Men's Choruses, Op. 38
- Der Vandalen Auszug, ballad for men's voices and orchestra, Op. 39
- 4 Lieder for Men's Voices, Op. 41
- Die Bernsteinhexe, ballade for mixed choir (or male-voice choir) and piano, Op. 42 (Dahn)
- Passion Oratorio on words from the Bible, for soloists, choir, organ and orchestra, Op. 45 (1895)
- 3 Sacred Folk Songs for Mixed Choir, Op. 46
- 3 Lieder for Voice and Piano, Op. 47
- Sapphic Ode to Aphrodite, for soprano, women's chorus and orchestra, Op. 49 (1901)
- Totentanz, a mysterium for soloists, choir and orchestra, Op. 51 (1905)
- Da lachte Schön-Sigrid, ballad for choir and orchestra, Op. 54
- Ode an den Tod (Ode to Death), for male chorus and orchestra, Op. 57 (Hölderlin)
- Da Jesus auf Erden ging, mysterium for soloists, choir, children's chorus, organ and orchestra, Op. 61 (1916)
- 10 Lieder und Gesänge for Voice and Piano, Op. 67 (Heine, Kerner)
- Wie glänzt der helle Mond (Kerner), for male chorus a cappella, Op. 68
- 3 Eight-part Motets for Mixed Choir, Op. 69
- Das deutsche Sanktus (Martin Luther) for Choir and Orchestra, Op. 73
- Zum neuen Jahr (To the New Year) for Chorus and Orchestra, Op. 79
