= Charles Albert =

Charles Albert may refer to:

- Charles Albert (boxer), French boxer
- Charles Albert of Sardinia (1798–1849), king of Sardinia
- Charles Albert II of Hohenlohe-Waldenburg-Schillingsfürst (1742–1796)
- Charles Albert III of Hohenlohe-Waldenburg-Schillingsfürst (1776–1843)
- Charles VII, Holy Roman Emperor (1697–1745), known as Charles Albert as king of Bohemia and elector of Bavaria

== See also ==
- Charles d'Albert (disambiguation)
