= Charles d'Albert =

Charles d'Albert may refer to:

- Charles d'Albert, 1st Duke of Luynes (1578–1621), French courtier
- Charles d'Albert, 3rd Duke of Chaulnes (1625–1698), French general
- Charles d'Albert (musician) (1809–1886), German-born British dance master and composer
- Charles Honoré d'Albert, 3rd Duke of Luynes (1646–1712)
- Charles Philippe d'Albert, 4th Duke of Luynes (1695–1758)
- Charles Louis d'Albert, 5th Duke of Luynes (1717–1771)
