= Ivan Törzs =

American conductor

Ivan Törzs is an American conductor and pianist educated at Princeton University, Mannes College of Music, and the Juilliard School.

He worked as a pianist and conductor in Charleston, Spoleto and Santa Fe before moving to Germany in 1981.

In Germany he conducted in Darmstadt, Hamburg and Karlsruhe. In 1993 he became principal conductor of the Mecklenburgisches Staatstheater Schwerin. From 1999 until the summer of 2002 he was also artistic director there. Highlights of his tenure included performances of Otello and Tannhäuser with American-born soprano Helen Donath and concert performances of Parsifal with Renata Scotto.

His repertoire in Schwerin included Tosca, Jenůfa, Der Rosenkavalier, Tristan und Isolde, Parsifal, Wozzeck and Pelléas et Mélisande. From 2002-2008, Ivan Törzs was music director of the Vlaamse Opera. He conducted Fidelio, La traviata, Arabella, Carmen, Salome, Luisa Miller, Il barbiere di Siviglia, Ariadne auf Naxos, and the Ring Cycle there.

As a guest conductor, Törzs has appeared in various European and American opera houses including the Vienna State Opera, the Hamburg State Opera, the Stuttgart Opera, as well as theaters and concert halls in Prague, Budapest, Moscow, Bern, Palermo, Warsaw, Honolulu, Miami and many other cities.

As an accompanist, he has performed in recital with singers like Kurt Moll, Edda Moser, Theo Adam, and Cheryl Studer.

From 2010 until 2020 Ivan Törzs was a professor at the Conservatory of Music in Detmold, Germany. He is also a Professor Emeritus at the Korean National University of the Arts in Seoul, South Korea.

Parallel to his musical career, he also works as an actor. Under the name Jonathan Tribe he has appeared at the Berliner Festspiele, the Vienna Theaterfestival, the Ruhrtriennale in Duisburg, Germany, as well as other stages. He appears in a number of TV commercials in Germany and the USA.
