= Hermine Finck =

German opera singer

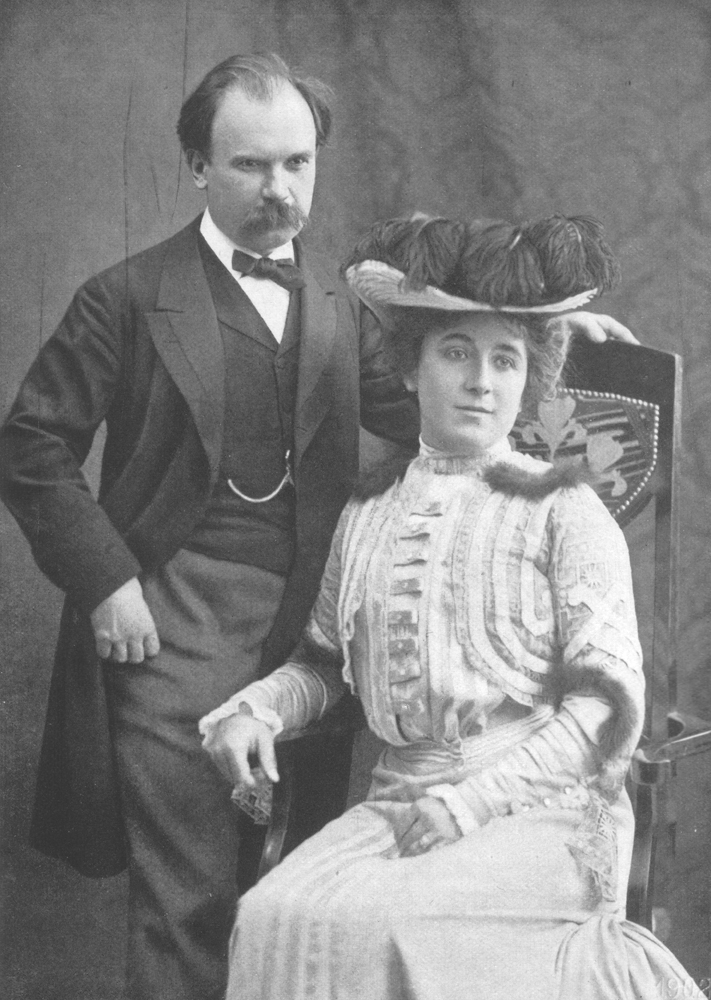
- Hermine Finck and Eugen d'Albert
- Born: 1 January 1872; Baden-Baden, German Empire
- Died: 31 October 1932 (aged 60); Berlin, Germany
- Other names: Hermine d'Albert
- Occupations: Opera singer (soprano); Vocal pedagogue
- Spouse: Eugen d'Albert (married 1895; divorced 1911)

Hermine Finck (1 January 1872 – 31 October 1932) was a German opera singer. She created the role of The Witch in the world premiere of Humperdinck's Hansel and Gretel and appeared in numerous leading soprano roles in the opera houses of Germany. Also known as Hermine d'Albert, she was the third wife of the composer Eugen d'Albert to whom she was married from 1895 until their divorce in 1911. Finck was born in Baden-Baden and died at age 60 in Berlin, where she had taught singing in her later years.

== Life and career ==
Finck was born in Baden-Baden to a prosperous middle-class family. She began her musical education at Dr. Hoch's Konservatorium in Frankfurt and later studied singing at the Leipzig conservatory with Gustav Borchers and Auguste Götze. Finck made her stage debut in the title role of Carmen at the Weimar Court Theater in 1892 and became a regular member of the company. She came to wider attention in 1893 when she sang the role of The Witch in the world premiere of Humperdinck's Hansel and Gretel. Finck and the composer Eugen d'Albert met that same year through his friendship with Richard Strauss who had conducted the Hansel and Gretel premiere. They began an affair, although d'Albert was still in a tempestuous marriage with his second wife, Teresa Carreño.

To be close to Finck, d'Albert took a job as Kapellmeister at the Weimar Court Theatre. Following his divorce from Carreño, the couple married on 21 October 1895 at the Protestant church in Gersbach. In 1897, Finck created the role of Waltrudis in the world premiere of d'Albert's three-act opera Gernot at the Mannheim Court Theater. However, after her marriage, she largely devoted herself to concert singing and touring with her husband and became known as the principal interpreter of d'Albert's vocal music. He wrote nearly 60 songs for her as well as Seejungfräulein, a cantata for soprano and orchestra loosely based on Hans Christian Andersen's fairy tale "The Little Mermaid".

Her marriage to d'Albert ended in divorce in 1911, two years after the birth of their only child, Violante Giovanna d'Albert. It had been the longest and most stable of d'Albert's six marriages. After their divorce, d'Albert married three more times. Finck moved to Berlin, where she resumed her stage career. She was engaged by the Berlin Court Opera from 1911 until 1912 and in the summer of 1912 appeared at the Bayreuth Festival as Gerhilde in Die Walküre. During the course of her career, Finck's other major roles included Bedura in d'Albert's Der Rubin, Donna Anna in Don Giovanni, Leonore in Fidelio, and the title roles of Mignon and Max von Schillings's Ingwelde.

In her later years, Finck continued to perform as a concert singer and taught singing in Berlin. She died there in 1932 at the age of 60. Eugen d'Albert had died earlier that year. Their daughter, Violante Bergel-d'Albert (as she was known after her marriage), became a journalist and writer and died in 1990.
