= Vlaamse Opera =

Opera and ballet company in Belgium

Opera Ballet Vlaanderen
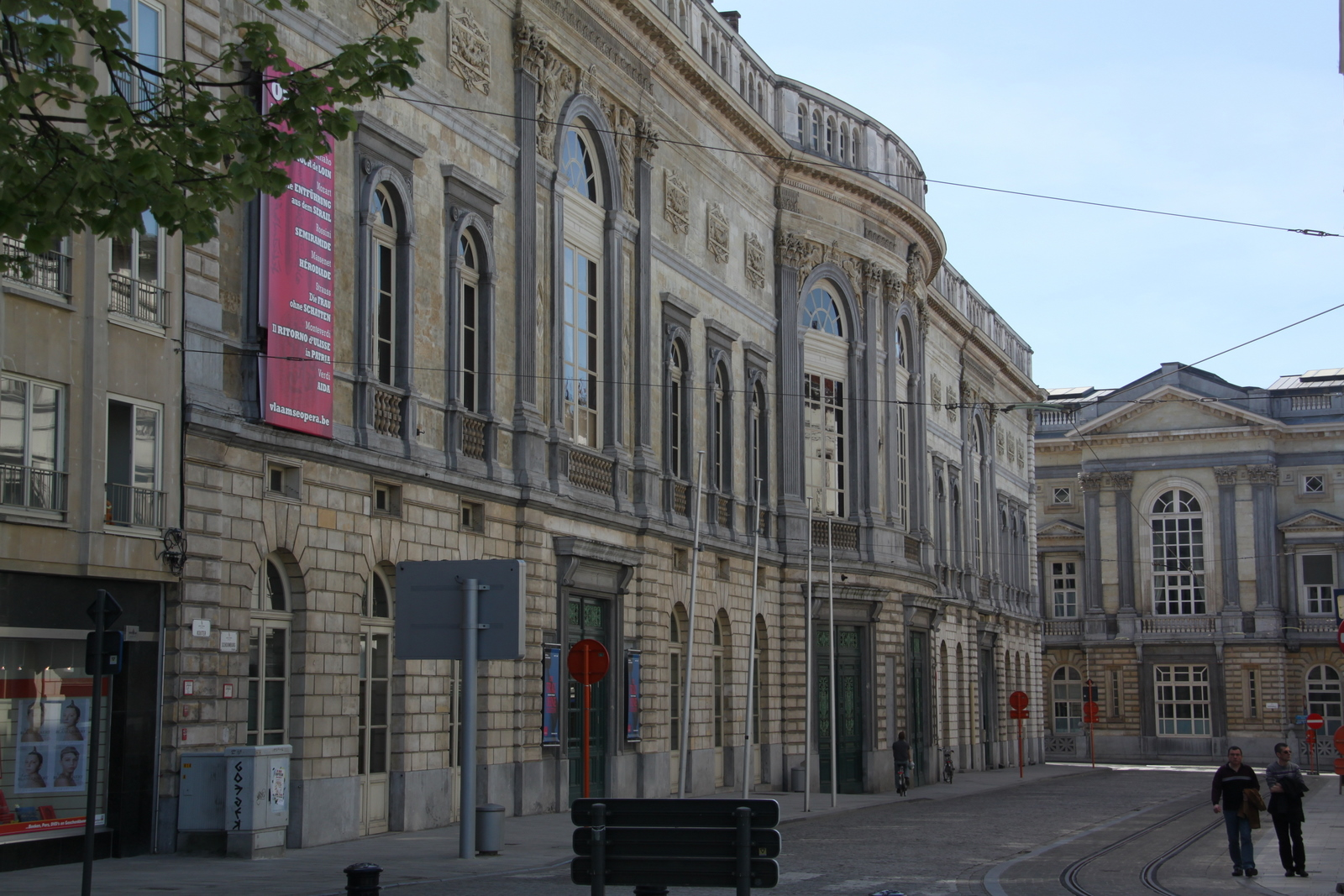
- Opera house of Ghent
- Formation: 1661 in Antwerp
- Location(s): Antwerp and Ghent, Belgium
- Leader: Jan Vandenhouwe
- Award: 2019 International Opera Awards
- Website: operaballet.be/en

Opera Ballet Vlaanderen (Dutch; "Opera Ballet Flanders") is an opera and ballet company in Belgium directed by Jan Vandenhouwe. It operates in two different opera houses in the Flemish cities of Ghent and Antwerp. However, the company shares one orchestra, choir, ballet company, technical team, etc. The organization is mainly financed by the Flemish government and the city councils of Antwerp and Ghent.

Opera Ballet Vlaanderen emerged from a fusion between The Flemish Opera (Vlaamse Opera) and the Royal Ballet of Flanders (Ballet Vlaanderen) in 2014. The Royal Ballet of Flanders was founded in 1969. The Flemish Opera was created in 1996 as a successor to the Flemish Opera Foundation (Vlaamse Opera Stichting) which had existed since 1988, and the Opera for Flanders (Opera voor Vlaanderen) which had existed since 1981. Both former institutions were similar fusions between the former Antwerp Opera and Ghent Opera. Since the fusion in 1981, the company has been giving performances in two different historic theatres.

The company received the "Opera Company of the Year" award at the 2019 International Opera Awards.

== History ==
=== Opera House Antwerp ===
The first public opera performances in Antwerp date back to 1661. Performances took place on the stage of the Schouwburgh van de Oude Voetboog (Theatre of the Guild of Crossbowmen) at the Grote Markt. The theatre gradually lost its popular Flemish character as French artists were engaged and the performances were no longer performed in the local (Dutch) language, but in French, the adopted language of the Flemish elite.

In 1709 a new theatre was installed in the "Tapissierspand", a former covered market for tapestry where alternately Italian and French operas were performed. The new auditorium burnt down in 1746 and was replaced by a new "Grand Théâtre" which opened in 1753. During the period of the United Kingdom of the Netherlands, the theatre was promoted to "Théâtre Royal". At that time the old theatre was already in decay and it became too small to house the growing public. Plans were made to tear down the old building and to replace it by a new and more prestigious building. In 1829 the last performance was given in the "Tappisierspand".

The new theatre opened after the Belgian revolution in 1834. (This building is now known as the Bourlaschouwburg and is used today for regular theatre performances.) The French repertoire (and, to a lesser extent, the Italian repertoire in French translation) continued to dominate.

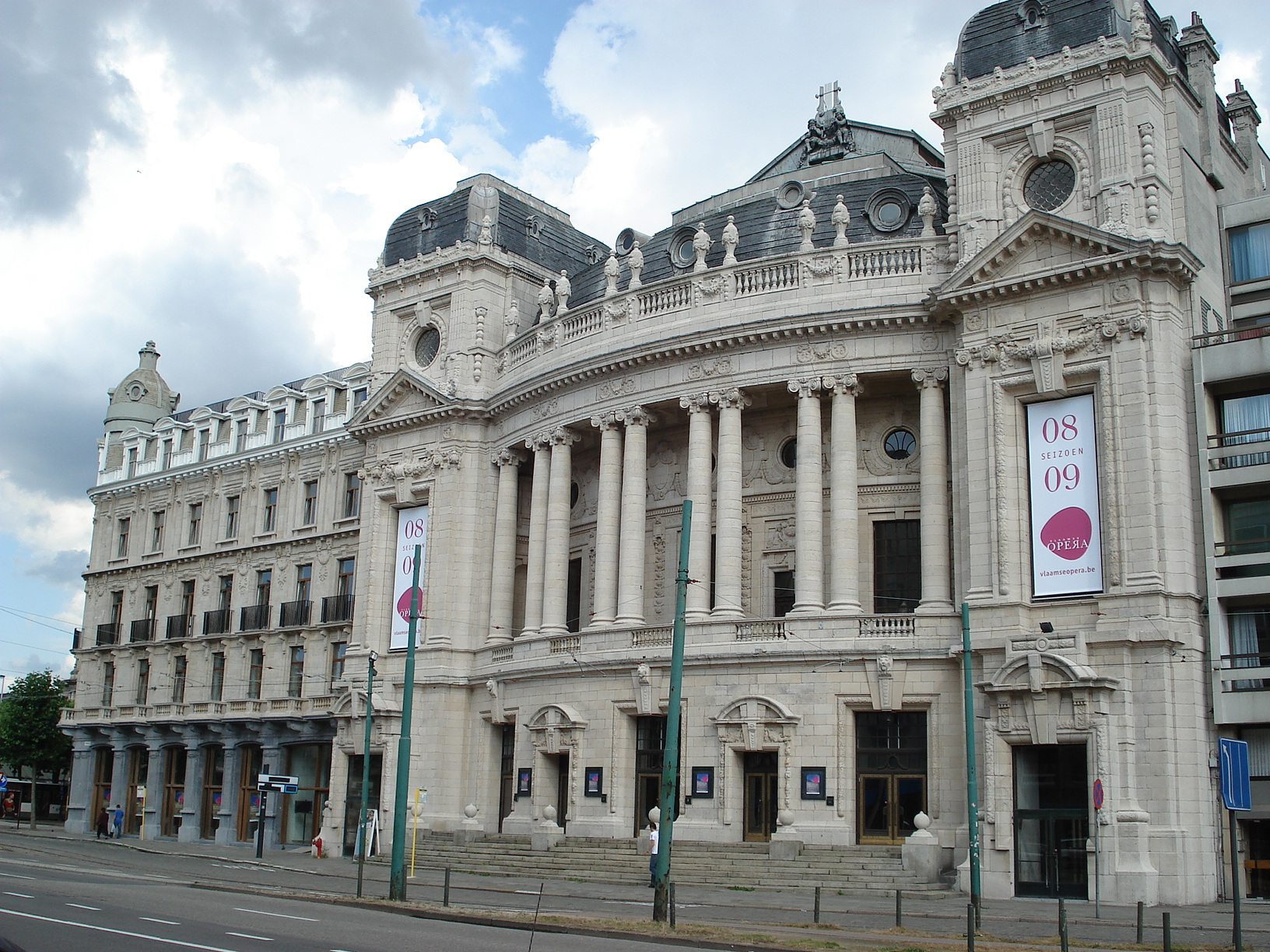
Opera House of Antwerp, inaugurated in 1907

The opera house closed in 2005 for a two-year renovation of the entire building. In November 2007, exactly 100 years after the grand opening in 1907, the opera opened again for a new season. New office buildings were constructed, the main auditorium was updated with new seating, a new heating system, and the walls were painted in a new fresh green colour. Behind the scenes all the offices are combined in the new 'Office territory' behind and next to the stage. Major improvements are the leveling of the stage floor (which had a rake of 4° due to 19th century practice), a big new side stage, updated lighting and mechanical structures.

Because of budget limitations (the first budget estimate for the entire renovation was 33 million euro but, after certain non critical phases were removed from the master plan, the total budget was 24 million euros), only the most urgent tasks were executed. Therefore, not all the ornaments were cleaned and the public hallways are painted white. It is expected that when new funds are available, the golden ornaments and hallways will be updated.

== Administration ==
- Directors

1947–55 : Vina Bovy
1981 : Alfons Van Impe
1987 : Gerard Mortier (ad interim)
1989 : Marc Clémeur
2008 : Aviel Cahn
2019 : Jan Vandenhouwe

- Chief conductors of the Symfonisch Orkest Opera Ballet Vlaanderen (Symphonic Orchestra of Opera Ballet Vlaanderen):

1989 : Rudolf Werthen
1993 : Stefan Soltesz
1997 : Marc Minkowski
2000 : Massimo Zannetti
2002 : Ivan Törzs
2011 : Dmitri Jurowski
2019 : Alejo Pérez
2026 : Francesco Angelico

- Chief conductors of the Koor Opera Ballet Vlaanderen (Choir of Opera Ballet Vlaanderen):

1989 : Peter Burian
1991 : Simon Halsey
1994 : Andrew Wise
1997 : Peter Burian
2002 : Kurt Bikkembergs
2008: Yannis Pouspourikas
2013: Jan Schweiger
