= Hans Joachim Moser =

German musicologist, composer and singer

Hans Joachim Moser (25 May 1889, Berlin – 14 August 1967, Berlin) was a German musicologist, composer, and singer.

Moser was the son of the music-professor Andreas Moser (1859–1925), a pupil and important early biographer of Joseph Joachim. He studied the History of Music (mainly with Gustav Jenner and Robert Kahn), German philology and Philosophy in Marburg, Berlin and Leipzig, and studied violin with his father. With the work Musical Confederations in the German Middle Ages he obtained his doctorate in 1910 at Rostock.

He took part as a lieutenant during the First World War, was officially accepted as part of the University of Halle in 1919, and in 1922 became extraordinary Professor. In 1925 he followed a call to Heidelberg. From 1927 to 1933 he was Director of the State Academy for Church and School Music in Berlin. In 1933 Moser was forcibly pensioned off on political grounds. In 1938 he became the representative leader of the Reichs-authority for Musical Activities in the Reichs-Ministry of Public Enlightenment and Propaganda; from 1940 until 1945 he was its General Secretary. He received in 1947 a professorship from the Jena University, but after two months it was withdrawn in the light of his activities in the Propaganda Ministry. From 1950 to 1960 Moser worked as director at the State Music Conservatory in West Berlin. In 1963 the Mozart Medal of the City of Vienna was bestowed upon him.

Moser wrote studies of numerous composers, like Paul Hofhaimer, Heinrich Schütz und Johann Sebastian Bach as well as his studies in Das deutsche Lied seit Mozart (German Song since Mozart) of 1937. During the 1920s he brought out a History of German Music in three volumes which was published in various forms. After the Second World War Moser wrote a History of Evangelical Church Music in Germany countless biographical essays, like (for example) his Musical History in 100 Life Stories. His Music-Lexikon went through five editions by 1955. Its later development was in the book in the manner of the Germanist Josef Nadler, Music in the German Tradition (1957). Moser carried out the new editing of the Monuments of German Composition (Denkmäler deutscher Tonkunst, or DDT).

Moser's oeuvre as a composer includes piano pieces, songs, theatre music and choral works.

Moser was the father of the singer Edda Moser (b. 1938), of the folklorist and literary scholar Dietz-Rüdiger Moser (1939–2010), and of the singer Wolf-Hildebrand Moser (b. 1943).

== Works ==
- Editions of Songs, including the newer 2-volume Carl Loewe for Edition Peters.
- Das deutsche Lied seit Mozart (Atlantis Verlag, Berlin and Zurich 1937).

== Sources ==
- Ludwig Finscher: Moser, Hans Joachim, in Die Musik in Geschichte und Gegenwart (Music in History and the Present), edited by Ludwig Finscher, 2. new Edition, Personenteil, Vol. 12. (Bärenreiter/ Metzler, Kassel et al. 2004), 528f.
- Ute Lemm: Musikwissenschaft in Westdeutschland nach 1945. (Musicology in West Germany since 1945). Analysen und Interpretationen diskursiver Konstellationen. (University Dissertation, Bonn 2005) (Volltext)
- Heinz Wegener (Editor): Festgabe für Hans Joachim Moser zum 65. Geburtstag. (Festschrift for Hans Joachim Moser on his 65th Birthday). (Hinnenthal, Kassel 1954) (with 91-page Bibliography).
