= Fanny Moran-Olden =

German opera singer

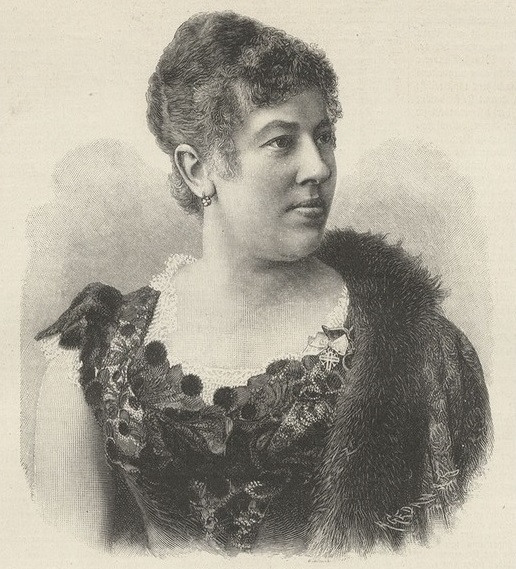
- Moran-Olden in 1886
- Born: Fanny Tappehorn; 28 September 1855; Cloppenburg, Grand Duchy of Oldenburg
- Died: 12 February 1905 (aged 49); Berlin, German Empire
- Other names: Fanny Olden; Fanny Bertram
- Occupation: Opera singer (soprano)
- Spouse: Theodor Bertram

Fanny Moran-Olden (28 September 1855 – 12 February 1905) was a German soprano who appeared in leading roles both in her native Germany and in other European opera houses as well as the Metropolitan Opera in New York. She appeared in wide variety of roles but was particularly prominent in the Wagnerian repertoire. Her voice had an unusually wide range which allowed her to sing soprano, mezzo-soprano and contralto roles. She was born in Cloppenburg and died hopelessly insane at the age of 49 in a sanatorium on the outskirts of Berlin. She was married twice, first to the tenor Carl Moran and secondly to the Wagnerian bass-baritone, Theodor Bertram.

== Life and career ==
The daughter of a medical officer in the Grand Duchy of Oldenburg civil service, Moran-Olden's surname at birth was Tappehorn but she later changed it to Olden because of her family's opposition to a stage career. She began her musical training in Hannover and then studied singing with Auguste Götze in Dresden. She made her concert debut in 1877 at the Leipzig Gewandhaus, and the following year made her opera debut in the title role of Norma at the Dresden Court Opera, after which she became a member of the Frankfurt Opera where she would remain until 1884. At Frankfurt, her roles included Maid Marian in the world premiere of Albert Dietrich's Robin Hood and Donna Anna in the production of Don Giovanni which inaugurated the new opera house in 1880. She had married the tenor Carl Moran, a fellow member of the Frankfurt Opera, in 1879 and added "Moran" to her surname. The following year, their daughter and only child, Dora (Theodora), was born.

From 1884 to 1891 Moran-Olden worked primarily at the Leipzig Opera House and then from 1891 to 1895 at the Munich Court Opera. However, in the 1888 and 1890 seasons she sang at New York's Metropolitan Opera. She made her Met debut on 28 November 1888 as Valentine in Les Huguenots. She went on to sing there as Leonore in Fidelio, Sélika in L'Africaine, Brünnhilde in both Siegfried and Die Walküre, Fricka in Das Rheingold, Fidès in Le Prophète, Azucena in Il trovatore, and Amneris in Aida. In 1896 she began an intense period of several years as a guest singer both in Germany and abroad. She sang in the opera houses of the Netherlands, Denmark, England, Poland, Budapest, Prague, and Russia. Other roles which she successfully essayed in the course of her career were Senta in Der Fliegende Holländer, Isolde in Tristan und Isolde, Ortrud in Lohengrin, Eglantine in Euryanthe, Frau Fluth in The Merry Wives of Windsor, Santuzza in Cavalleria rusticana, and the title role of Carmen.

Moran-Olden divorced Carl Moran and in 1897 married the renowned Wagnerian bass-baritone, Theodor Bertram, who was fourteen years her junior. She retired from the stage in 1902 and taught singing at the Klindworth-Scharwenka Conservatory in Berlin. However, her career as a teacher was short-lived. In 1903 she was afflicted with a brain disease which led to incurable insanity. She spent the last two years of her life in a sanatorium in Schöneberg on the outskirts of Berlin. She died there in 1905 at the age of 49. Theodor Bertram committed suicide in 1907. Her first husband, Carl Moran, died in 1940. Their daughter, Dora Moran-Olden, became a concert and lieder singer of some note and died in 1930.

== Roles created ==
Roles sung by Moran-Olden in world premiere performances included:

- Maid Marian in Albert Dietrich's Robin Hood, Frankfurt, 1879
- Zoraya in Joseph Abert's Die Almohaden, Leipzig, 1890
- Sesella in Niccola Spinelli's A basso porto, Cologne, 1894
