= Ferdinand Lion =

Swiss journalist and writer

Ferdinand Lion (11 June 1883 – 21 January 1968) was a Swiss journalist and writer.

== Life ==
Born in Mulhouse, Lion studied history and philosophy in Strasbourg, Munich and Heidelberg, got to know André Gide during a stay in Paris and worked as a journalist during the First World War, among others for the Neuen Merkur. Since 1917 he became friends with Thomas Mann, later also with Alfred Döblin. After the end of the war he became literary editor by Ullstein Verlag in Berlin, employee of the Neue Rundschau and wrote libretti, among others for Eugen d'Albert and Paul Hindemith. He emigrated to Switzerland in 1933, was editor of the magazine Maß und Wert in 1937/1938, lived in France during the Second World War and returned to Zurich in 1946. In addition to fiction, Lion wrote literary, historical, and philosophical treatises, including Lebensquellen der deutschen Metaphysik (1960).

== Works ==
Libretti

- Revolutionshochzeit; Opera, music by Eugen d’Albert (1919)
- Der Golem; Musikdrama (opera), music by Eugen d’Albert (1926)
- Cardillac. Opera; music, (1925/26) Paul Hindemith

Essays

- Geschichte biologisch gesehen. Max Niehans, Zürich 1935
- Romantik als deutsches Schicksal. Rowohlt Verlag, Stuttgart/Hamburg 1947
- Lebensquellen französischer Metaphysik. (Translated from French by Ruth Gillischewski, with Hans Hermann Hagedorn as illustrator). Claassen & Goverts, Zürich 1949
- Geist und Politik in Europa. Verstreute Schriften aus den Jahren 1915–1961. Wallstein Verlag, ISBN 3-89244-141-3

== Bibliography ==
- Konrad Feilchenfeldt (1985). "Lion, Ferdinand". Neue Deutsche Biographie (in German). Vol. 14. Berlin: Duncker & Humblot. pp. 641–642. (full text online).
- Walter Tetzlaff: 2000 Kurzbiographien bedeutender deutscher Juden des 20. Jahrhunderts. Askania, Lindhorst 1982, ISBN 3-921730-10-4.
- Lion, Ferdinand. In Lexikon deutsch-jüdischer Autoren. Band 16: Lewi–Mehr. edited from Archiv Bibliographia Judaica. Saur, München 2008, ISBN 978-3-598-22696-0, p. 63–71.
