= Robert vom Scheidt =

German opera singer

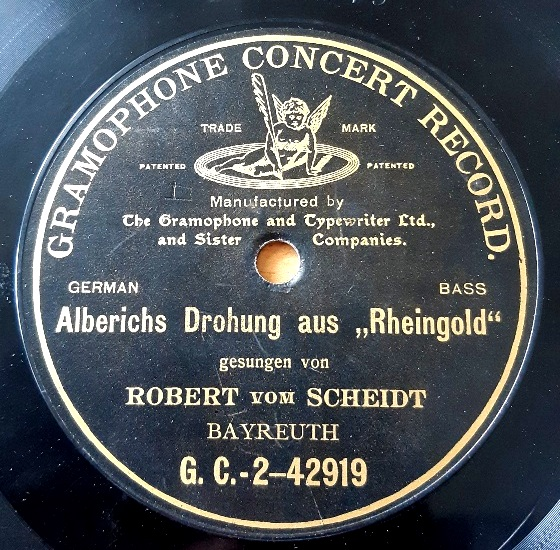
Record of Robert vom Scheidt (Bayreuth 1904)

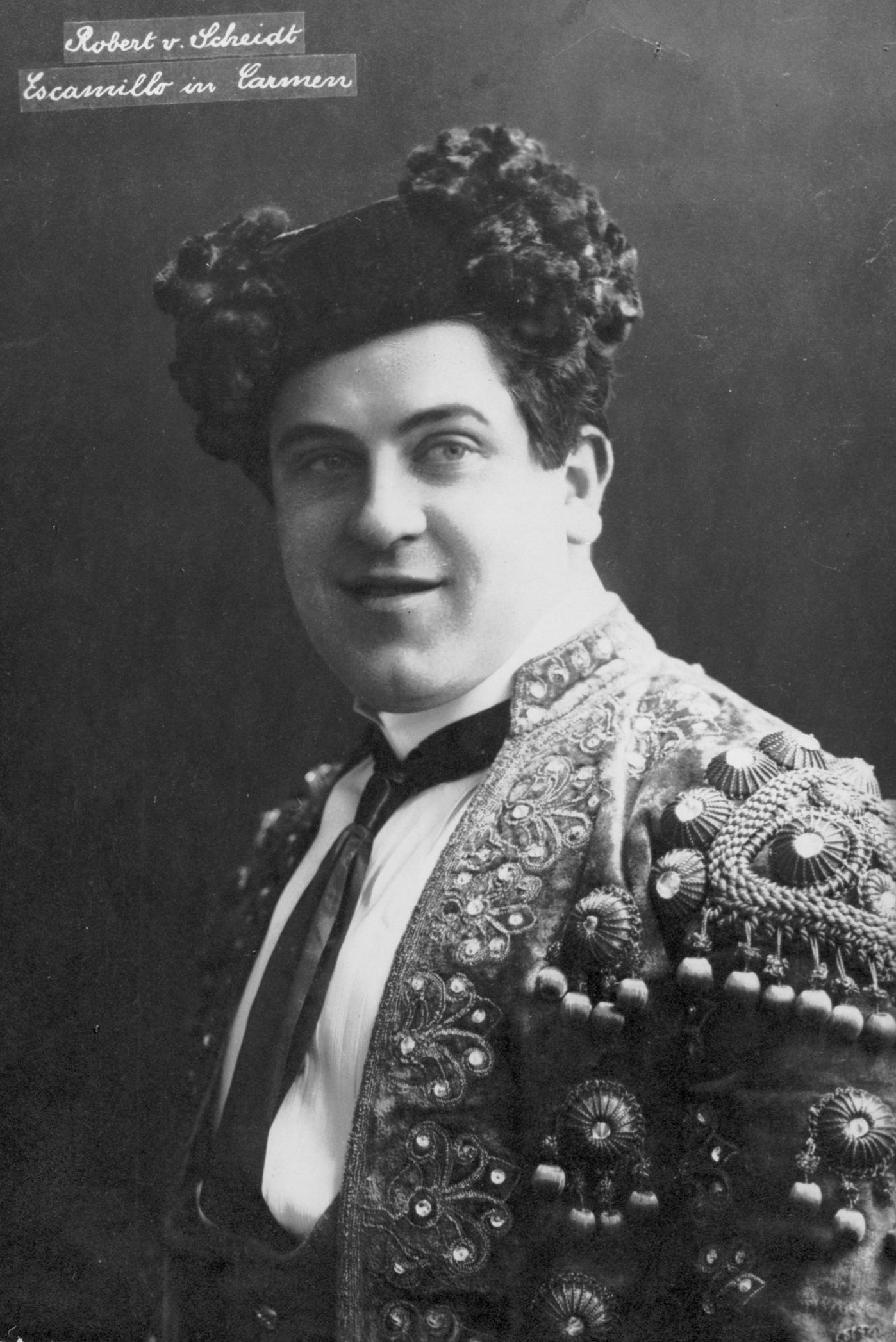
Robert vom Scheidt as Escamillo

Robert vom Scheidt (16 April 1881, Elberfeld – 10 April 1964, Frankfurt) was a German operatic baritone. He created roles in several world premieres at the Oper Frankfurt, including Wolf in Franz Schreker's Das Spielwerk und die Prinzessin (1913), Vitellozzo Tamare/Andrea in Schreker's Die Gezeichneten (1918), Baliv in Schreker's Der Schatzgräber (1920), and Rabbi Leone in Eugène d'Albert's Der Golem (1926).

His elder sister was Selma vom Scheidt (1874–1959), a soprano at the court of the Grand Duke in Weimar. His elder brother, Julius vom Scheidt (1877–1949), was also an opera singer.

Vom Scheidt left records for G&T (Bayreuth 1904), Gramophone (Berlin 1909), Homokord (Berlin 1909), Anker (Berlin 1909), Odeon (Berlin 1909), Polyphon (Leipzig 1910) and Pathé (Berlin 1911-12).
