= Edda Moser =

German operatic soprano (born 1938)

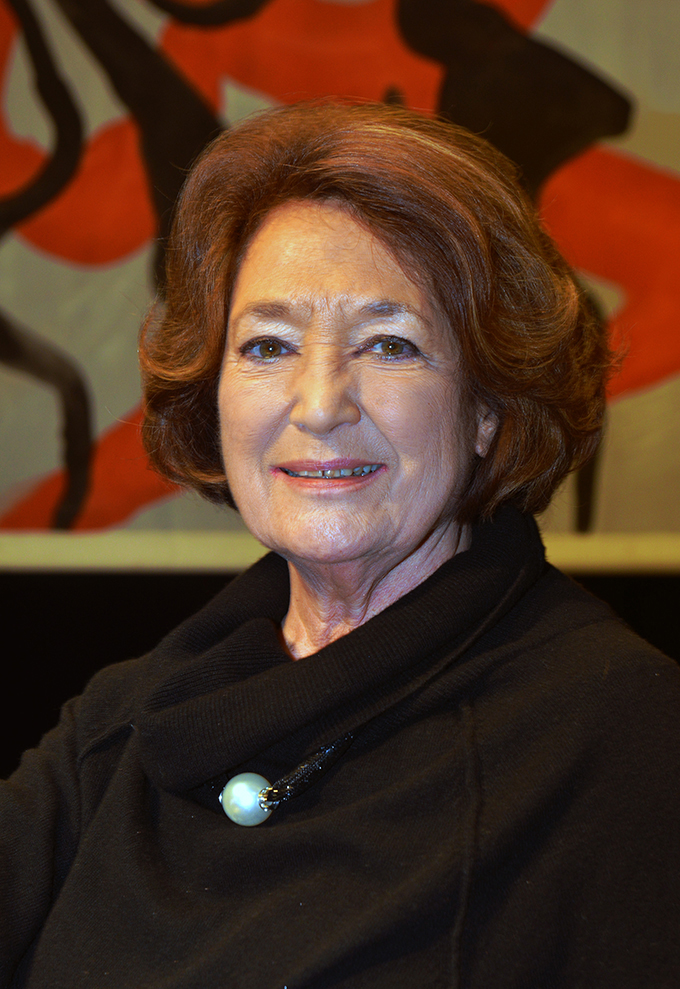
- Moser in 2016
- Born: 27 October 1938 (age 87); Berlin, Germany
- Occupations: Operatic soprano; academic teacher; language activist
- Years active: 1962–present
- Organisation(s): Vienna State Opera; Hochschule für Musik Köln; Festspiel der Deutschen Sprache
- Known for: Der Hölle Rache on the Voyager Golden Record
- Father: Hans Joachim Moser
- Website: www.eddamoser.com

Edda Moser (born 27 October 1938) is a German operatic soprano. She was particularly well known for her interpretations of music by Mozart. Her 1973 recital LP Virtuose Arien von W.A. Mozart received the Grand Prix du Disque.

== Life and career ==
Moser was born in Berlin, the daughter of the musicologist Hans Joachim Moser. She is aunt to cellist Johannes Moser and pianist Benjamin Moser. She studied at the Stern Conservatory with Hermann Weißenborn and Gerty König and made her debut as Kate Pinkerton in Madama Butterfly at the Deutsche Oper Berlin in 1962. After singing in the Würzburg Opera Chorus from 1962 until 1963, she sang at the opera houses in Hagen, Bielefeld, Hamburg and Frankfurt, before joining the Vienna State Opera in 1971. She also sang in Salzburg.

She made her American debut in November 1968, when she appeared at the Metropolitan Opera in the role of Wellgunde in Das Rheingold. She went on to sing various roles there over nine seasons, including the parts of Donna Anna (Don Giovanni) and the Queen of the Night (The Magic Flute), as well as Liù in Puccini's Turandot.

She maintained an extensive repertoire, singing both coloratura and spinto soprano roles. She played Donna Anna in Joseph Losey's movie Don Giovanni. She was one of the original performers of Hans Werner Henze's oratorio Das Floß der Medusa which she created on disc because the intended premiere in Hamburg was cancelled after a classical music riot.

Opera News has said in a review of a series of recordings made in the 1980s that Moser could sing with a "finely controlled" legato."

After retiring from opera, Moser remained active as a recitalist during the late 1990s. She gave several concerts in Germany with Ivan Törzs at the piano (Dresden, Semperoper 1997, Stadttheater Gießen (1999) with programs ranging from Johann Adolph Hasse to Clara Schumann and Richard Strauss. She gave her farewell performance in Munich in 1999 at the Cuvilliés Theatre.

Edda Moser is involved in promoting the use of proper German instead of Denglisch. In 2006 she founded the yearly Festspiel der Deutschen Sprache (Festival of German language). Three CDs documenting this festival have appeared thus far at the German publishing house Bastei Lübbe. She was also a professor of singing at the Hochschule für Musik in Cologne.

A recording by Moser of "Der Hölle Rache kocht in meinem Herzen" from The Magic Flute was included on the Voyager Golden Record.

== Recordings ==
=== Operas and operettas (studio recordings) ===
- Beethoven – Fidelio – Leonore
- D'Albert – Die Abreise – Luise
- Gluck – Orfeo ed Euridice – Amor
- Gounod – Faust (in German Margarethe highlights) – Marguerite
- Humperdinck – Hänsel und Gretel – Knusperhexe
- Kálmán – Gräfin Mariza – Manja
- Lehár – Giuditta – Giuditta
- Lehár – Die lustige Witwe – Hanna Glawari
- Leoncavallo – Pagliacci (Der Bajazzo) – Nedda
- Mozart – Apollo et Hyacinthus – Hyacinthus
- Mozart – Don Giovanni – Donna Anna
- Mozart – Idomeneo – Elettra
- Mozart – Der Schauspieldirektor – Mademoiselle Silberklang
- Mozart – Die Zauberflöte – Königin der Nacht
- Orff – Prometheus – Chorführerin I
- Rameau – Hippolyte et Aricie – prêtresse, chasseresse
- Schubert – Die Verschworenen – Gräfin Ludmilla
- Schumann – Genoveva – Genoveva
- O. Strauss – Ein Walzertraum – Franzi Steingrüber
- Suppé – Boccaccio – Beatrice
- Verdi – Don Carlos (in German, highlights) – Elisabetta
- Wagner – Das Rheingold, Götterdämmerung – Wellgunde
- Weber – Abu Hassan – Fatime

=== Sacred music ===
- Bach – Magnificat (BWV 243)
- Beethoven – Missa Solemnis
- Handel – Brockes Passion
- Mozart – Krönungsmesse
- Mozart – Vesperae solennes de confessore

=== Concert arias and operatic recitals ===
- Virtuose Arien von WA Mozart, Orchestra of the Bavarian State Opera, Munich, EMI Electrola 1C 063-29 082 (1 LP, issued 1973)
  - Works:
    - O zittre nicht, mein lieber Sohn, recitative and aria for the Queen of the Night from Die Zauberflöte
    - "Der Hölle Rache kocht in meinem Herzen", aria for the Queen of the Night from Die Zauberflöte
      - Conductor: Wolfgang Sawallisch
    - "Popoli di Tessaglia!", K. 316, recitative and aria for soprano and orchestra
    - "Crudele? – Non mi dir, bell idol mio", recitative and aria for Donna Anna from Don Giovanni
    - "Ma che vi fece, o stelle ... Sperai vicino il lido", K. 368, recitative and aria for soprano and orchestra
    - "Martern aller Arten" from Die Entführung aus dem Serail
      - Conductor: Leopold Hager
  - Awards: Grand Prix du Disque; Schallplattenpreis der Mozartgemeinde Wien
- Various other albums with Mozart Concert Arias on EMI and Berlin Classics (with Jeanette Scovotti)
- Mendelssohn – "Infelice! Ah, ritorna, età felice", Op. 94
- Opera Recital, arias from Tannhäuser, Oberon, Ariadne auf Naxos, Alceste, Rinaldo, Iphigenie en Tauride, La clemenza di Tito, Münchner Rundfunkorchester, conductor Peter Schneider
- Wagner – arias (Isolde, Brünnhilde) Ljubljana Symphony Orchestra, conductor Anton Nanut

Live recordings

- Handel – Rinaldo – Alcina (Met, 1984)
- Henze – Novae de infinito laudes
- Mozart – Don Giovanni – Donna Anna (Met, 1971)
- Mozart – Mitridate – Aspasia
- Verdi – Rigoletto – Gilda
- Wagner – Die Walküre, first act – Sieglinde
- The Metropolitan Opera Centennial Gala (1983)

Anthologies

- Great Moments of ... Edda Moser [EMI box set]
- Edda Moser singt Mozart, EMI 2006

=== Other ===
Various albums on EMI with Lieder by Robert Schumann (Frauenliebe und -leben), Clara Schumann (Drei Lieder nach Friedrich Rückert), Brahms, Wolf (Mignon Lieder), Strauss (Brentano Lieder, Ophelia Lieder), Pfitzner and Schubert.

- Cavalieri – Rappresentatione di Anima, et di Corpo – Vita Mondana
- Henze – Cantatas Being Beauteous, Cantata della Fiaba Estrema, Whispers from Heavenly Death
- Henze – Das Floß der Medusa – La Mort
- Haydn – Die Jahreszeiten – Hanne
- Bruno Maderna – Studi per 'Il processo' di Franz Kafka
- Schumann – Das Paradies und die Peri – Die Peri
- Schumann – "Des Sängers Fluch", Op. 139
- Schumann – Spanisches Liederspiel, Spanische Liebeslieder, Tragödie, Liebesfrühling, Minnespiel

Symphonies

- Beethoven – 9th symphony
- Mahler – 8th symphony

Spoken word

- Fairy tales for Christmas by Hans Christian Andersen
- Poems to the Moon (Mondgedichte)

== Bibliography ==
- Jürgen Kesting, Die großen Sänger (vol. 2) 1986, pp. 1371–1375 "Tragische Scheuche: Edda Moser"
