= Bethen =

Town in Lower Saxony, Germany

Coordinates: 52°51′55″N 8°03′44″E

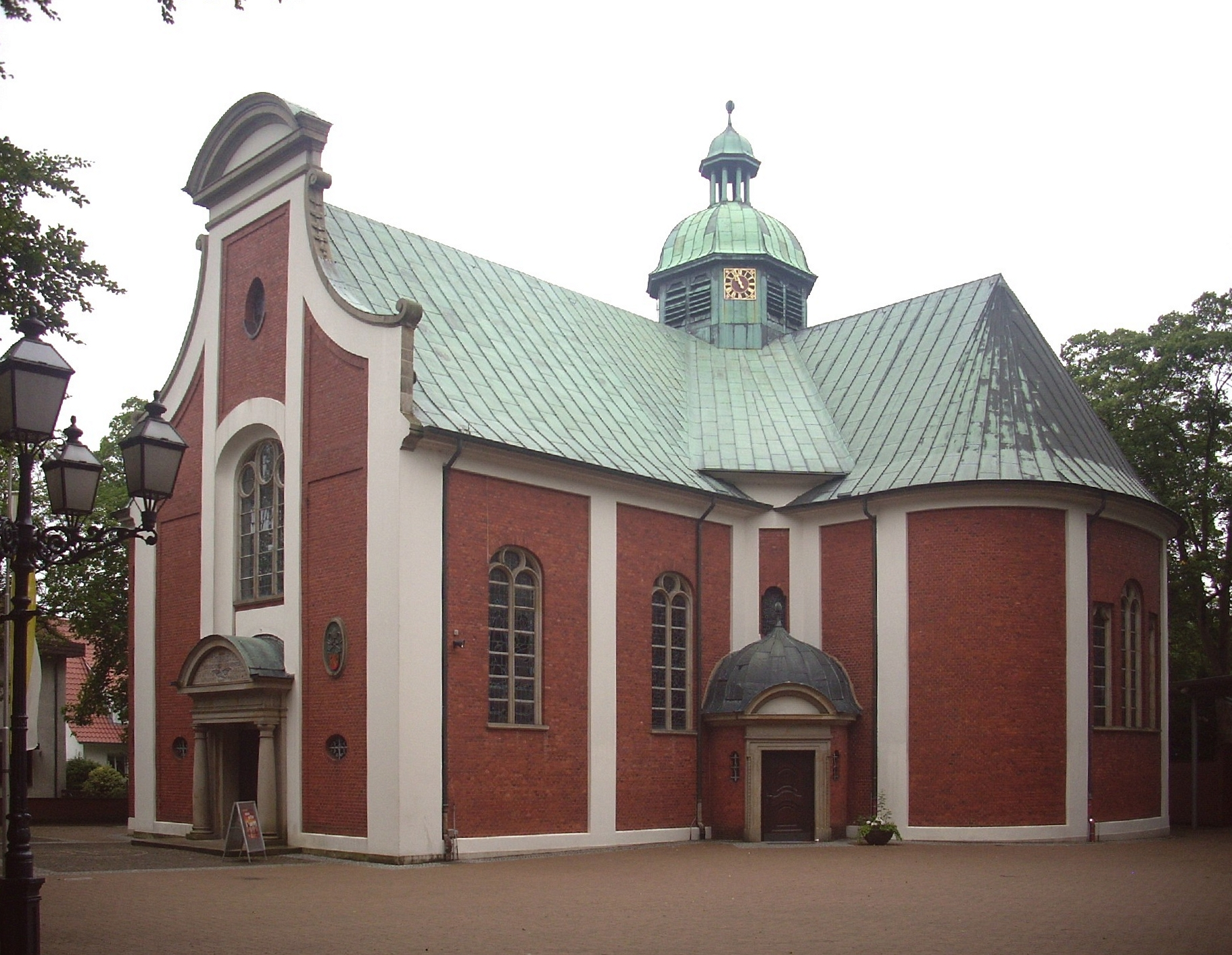
Bethen Pilgrimage basilica

Bethen is a small town on the edge of the German city Cloppenburg in Lower Saxony. It is a Marian shrine, as such first mentioned in 1448.
