= Theodor Bertram =

German opera singer

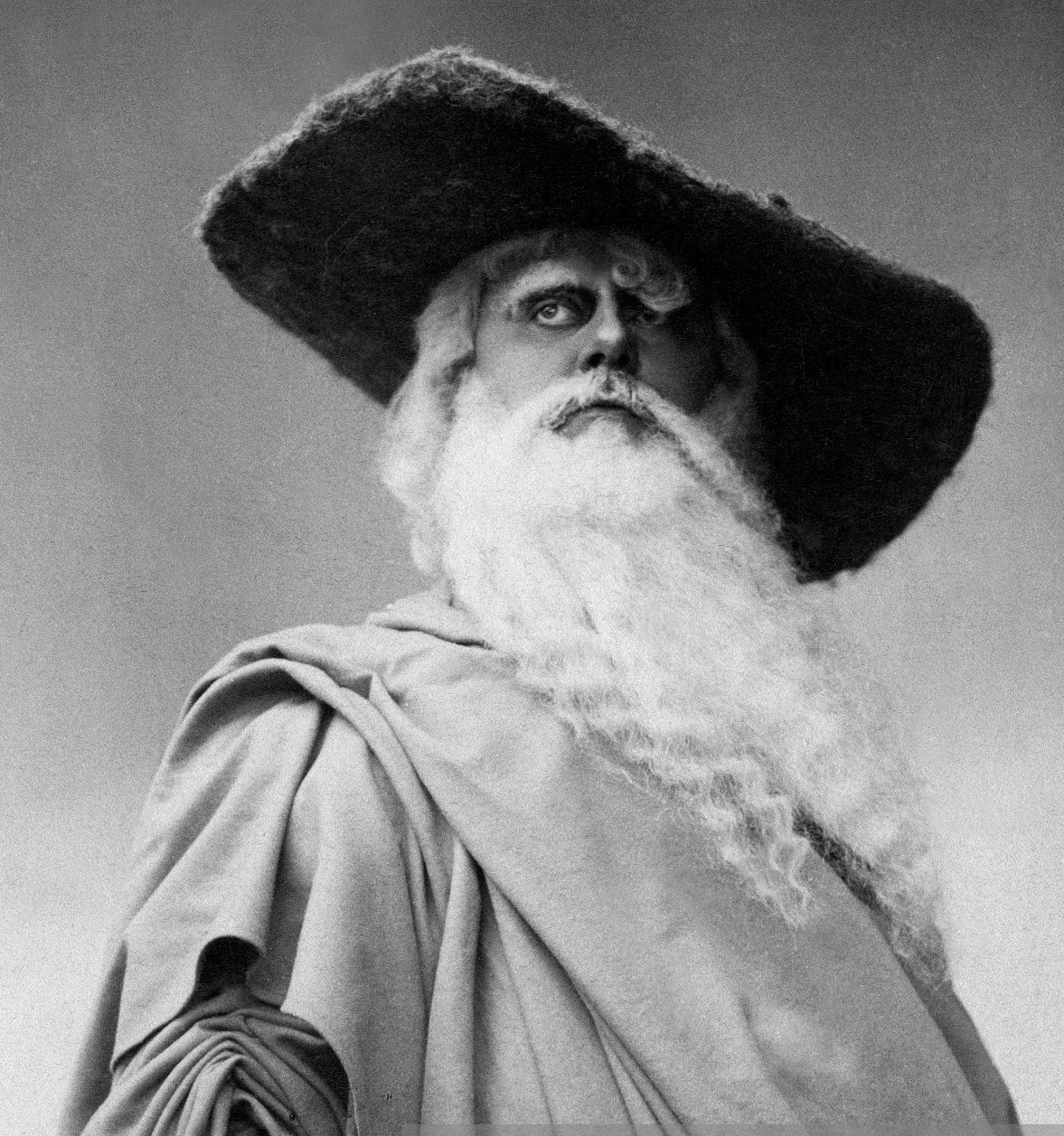
- Bertram as Wotan in Wagner's Siegfried
- Born: 12 February 1869; Stuttgart, Kingdom of Württemberg
- Died: 24 November 1907 (aged 38); Bayreuth, German Empire
- Occupation: Opera singer (bass-baritone)
- Spouse: Fanny Moran-Olden

Theodor Bertram (12 February 1869 – 24 November 1907) was a German bass-baritone prominent in the operas of Richard Wagner. A regular performer at the Bayreuth Festival from 1901 to 1906, he was greatly admired for his portrayals of Wagnerian heroes and particularly Wotan. Bertram was born in Stuttgart and died by suicide in Bayreuth following the death of his second wife, Lotte Wetterling. His first wife was the soprano Fanny Moran-Olden who was also a prominent Wagnerian singer.

== Life and career ==
Bertram was born in Stuttgart to the baritone Heinrich Bertram (1825–1903) and the soprano Marie Bertram-Mayer (1838–1882). He was trained in singing by his father and made his debut at the age of twenty in the small role of The Hermit in Der Freischütz at the city theatre of Ulm. Bertram was then engaged at the Hamburg Opera in 1891, the Berlin Kroll Opera in 1892, and the Munich Court Opera in 1893. Bertram remained with the Munch Court Opera until 1899 singing there in three world premieres. He also achieved great success in the roles of Hans Sachs and Wotan at the Munich Wagner Festival.

The end of 1899 saw Bertram singing with the Metropolitan Opera, both on tour to Boston, Philadelphia, Chicago, and Cincinnati and in the main opera house in New York City. He made his company debut on 2 December 1899 as Wotan in Die Walküre and remained with the company until April 1901 singing in a total of 78 performances. His other Wagnerian roles at the Met were Telramund in Lohengrin, The Dutchman in Der Fliegende Holländer, Wolfram in Tannhäuser, Hans Sachs in Die Meistersinger von Nürnberg, and Kurwenal in Tristan und Isolde. He also appeared with the company as Herr Fluth in Die Lustige Weibern von Windsor, Pizarro in Fidelio, and in the title role of Don Giovanni.

Bertram made his first appearance at the Bayreuth Festival in 1892 in the relatively minor role of Konrad Nachtigall in Die Meistersinger von Nürnberg. He returned to the festival in 1901 at the height of his career and appeared there regularly until 1906 in a variety of leading roles including Wotan, The Dutchman, Wolfram, and Amfortas. His work was highly valued by Cosima Wagner, especially his portrayals of Wotan in the four operas of Der Ring des Nibelungen. During this time, he also undertook a series of guest appearances in several German opera houses and abroad. He sang at the Vienna Court Opera in 1902, the Neues Deutsches Theater in Prague from 1901 to 1905, the Zürich Opera House from 1903 to 1905, the Royal Swedish Opera in 1904, and London's Royal Opera House where he appeared in 1900, 1903 and 1907.

According to his entry in the Großes Sängerlexikon, Bertram possessed a voice "with an inexhaustible fullness of tone and expressive power" which made him an "incomparable" Wotan. It also allowed him to excel in certain Mozart roles: Papageno in The Magic Flute, the Count in The Marriage of Figaro, Alfonso in Così fan tutte, and the title role of Don Giovanni. His successful roles outside the Wagner and Mozart repertoire included Mephistopheles in Faust, Lothario in Mignon, Dapertutto in The Tales of Hoffmann, and Tonio in Pagliacci. Bertram left a large recorded legacy dating from 1902 to 1907 on the G & T, Lyrophon, Odeon, Columbia, and Edison labels .

In 1897 Bertram had married the soprano Fanny Moran-Olden who was noted for her portrayal of Wagnerian heroines and was fourteen years his senior. Their years together were cut short in 1903 when she was committed to a sanatorium outside Berlin afflicted with hopeless insanity. She died there two years later. Shortly after Moran-Olden's death he married Lotte Wetterling, a former singer in Berlin variety shows. When she died in February 1907 in the SS Berlin shipwreck off the Hook of Holland, Bertram suffered a mental collapse. Increasingly in debt and drinking heavily, he hanged himself in a hotel room in Bayreuth nine months later. At his wish, he was buried in Holland next to Lotte.

== Roles created ==
Roles sung by Bertram in world premiere performances included:

- Theuerdank in Ludwig Thuille's Theuerdank, Nationaltheater, Munich, 12 February 1897.
- Cerikov in Alexander von Zemlinsky's Sarema, Nationaltheater, Munich, 10 October 1897
- Fremder in Siegfried Wagner's Der Bärenhäuter, Nationaltheater, Munich, 22 January 1899
- Prinz von Hildburghausen in Bernhard Scholz's Anno 1757, Königliches Schauspielhaus, Berlin, 18 January 1903
