= Gustav Kastropp =

German poet

Gustav Kastropp (30 August 1844 – 11 September 1925) was a German poet, librettist and musician. Kastropp's texts were used by composers such as Georg Schumann, Eugen d'Albert and Bernhard Stavenhagen.

== Biography ==
Kastropp was born in Salmünster, Hesse. He went to Gymnasium in Göttingen and just like his father he worked as a pharmacist. He studied music at the conservatories in Stuttgart, Göttingen and Sondershausen. From 1874 to 1877 he taught literature at the Großherzogliche Orchesterschule in Weimar.

He died in Hildesheim, Germany.

== Works ==
- König Elfs Lieder (1875)
- Helene (1875)
- Suleika (1876)
- Gnomenmärchen (1877)
- Dornröschen (1877)
- Das vierblättrige Kleebatt (1879), with Richard Roltsch
- Kain (1880)
- Heinrich von Ofterdingen (1880)
- Agamemnon (1890)
- Gunhild (1891)
- Phantasien und Märchen (1891)
- Gernot (1896), libretto for an opera by Eugen d'Albert
- Der Improvisator (1902), libretto for an opera by Eugen d'Albert
