= Der Golem (opera) =

Opera by Eugen d'Albert

Der Golem is an opera in three acts by composer Eugen d'Albert. The work uses a German language libretto by Ferdinand Lion after Arthur Holitscher's 1908 play Der Golem: Ghettolengende in drei Aufzügen. The opera premiered on 14 November 1926 at the Oper Frankfurt, conducted by Clemens Krauss.

== Roles ==
Roles, voice types, premiere cast
Role	Voice type	Premiere cast, 14 November 1926 Conductor: Clemens Krauss
Der Golem	bass	Jean Stern
Rabbi Loew	baritone	Robert vom Scheidt
His apprentice	tenor	Hans Brandt
Lea, Rabbi Loew's foster daughter	soprano	Elisabeth Kandt
Emperor Rudolf II	bass	Walter Schneider
First Jew	tenor	Hans Brandt
Second Jew	baritone	Robert vom Scheidt

== Recordings ==
In 2010 the German company Musikproduktion Dabringhaus und Grimm (MDG) released a live recording made early in 2010, with Stefan Blunier conducting the Beethoven Orchester Bonn.
