= Charles d'Albert (musician) =

Dance-music composer (1809–1886)

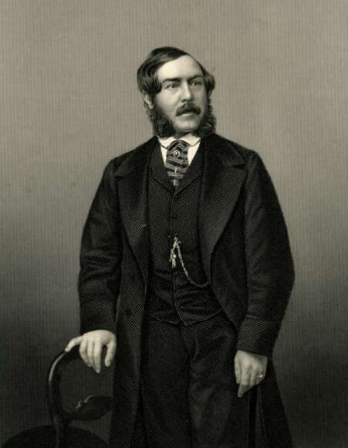
Portrait of D'Albert taken c. 1850s

Charles Louis Napoléon d'Albert (25 February 1809 – 26 May 1886) was a German-born British dance master and prolific composer of popular dance music. In addition to his own compositions he published numerous arrangements of operatic melodies as dance music. He was the father of the Romantic-era pianist Eugene d'Albert.

== Life and career ==
D'Albert was born on 25 February 1809 in Nienstedten, near Hamburg, the only son of François Benoit d'Albert, a cavalry captain in the French Army and aide-de-camp to General Bernard-Georges-François Frère. His mother was Chretienne Sophie Henriette, née Schultz, daughter of Johann Carl Schultz, a Hamburg merchant. She was an accomplished amateur musician and gave d'Albert his first instruction, introducing him to the music of Haydn, Mozart, and Beethoven. His father died in 1816, and Johann Schultz was ruined by commercial failures. The necessity of earning a living led the widow to turn her musical skills to account. Having many contacts in England she moved there with her child.

D'Albert studied the piano with Frédéric Kalkbrenner and composition with Samuel Wesley in London. Kalkbrenner left England in 1824 and settled in Paris; d'Albert followed suit, becoming a student at the Académie Royale, where he studied music and dance. Returning to England he joined the corps de ballet of The King's Theatre, and rose to be principal dancer and ballet master both there and at Covent Garden.

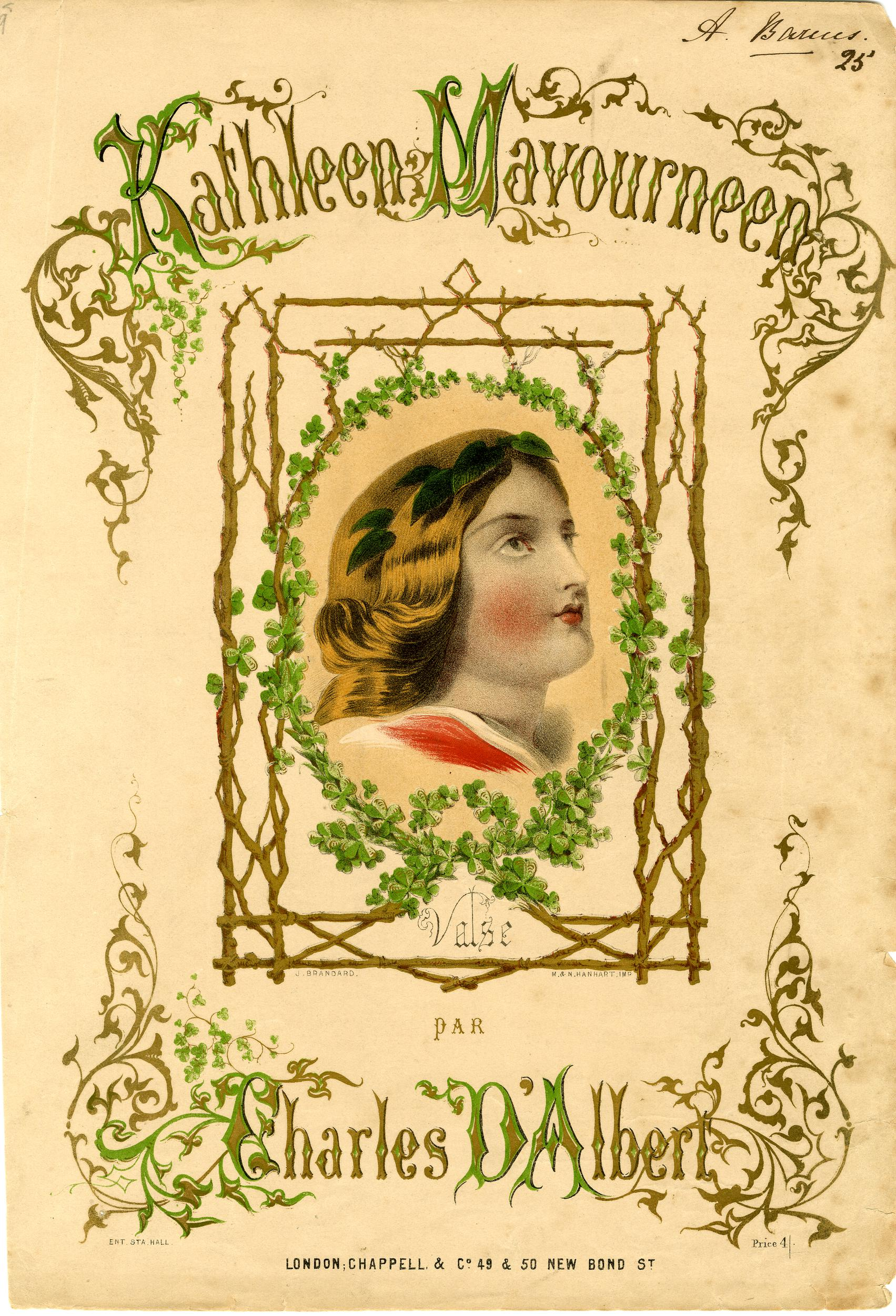
Cover of his valse adaptation of "Kathleen Mavourneen"

By 1835 d'Albert had left London for Newcastle upon Tyne, had established his own dance school and was composing dance music. There, he published Ballroom Etiquette (1835). His first success as a composer of popular dances was the "Bridal Polka" in 1845. On 28 May 1863 d'Albert and Annie Rowell, who ran a school in Newcastle, were married in Paris. The following year, during an annual teaching trip to Scotland, Annie gave birth to Eugen d'Albert who became a well known pianist and composer.

At one time d'Albert had about 300 piano and piano duet pieces in print, especially quadrilles, waltzes, polkas and galops, but also orchestral and military band arrangements. Many were arrangements of music from operas and operettas, including those by George Alexander Macfarren, Friedrich von Flotow, Giuseppe Verdi, Robert Planquette, Edmond Audran, and Gilbert and Sullivan.

After a successful career, d'Albert and his wife retired to Kensington, London in 1876. He continued to compose and promote his son's career as a virtuoso pianist and composer. D'Albert died on 26 May 1886, aged 77, and was buried in Kensal Green Cemetery.
