= Giuseppe Concone =

Italian composer

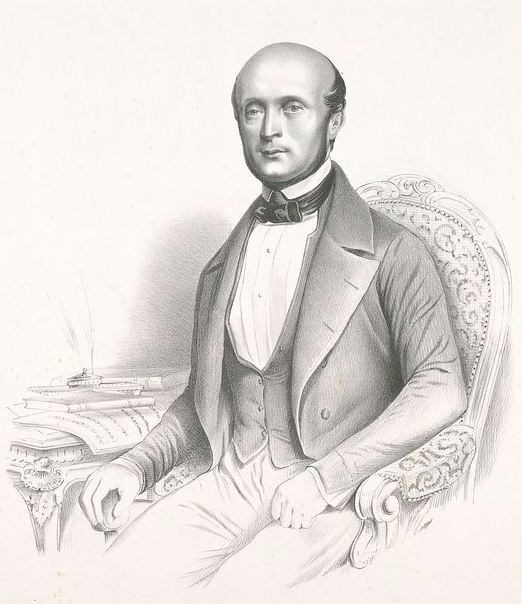

Giuseppe Concone (September 12, 1801 - June 1, 1867 Turin) was an Italian voice teacher and composer.

== Life and careerr ==
Giuseppe Concone was born in Turin, Italy on September 12, 1801. He had a brief career as singer before devoting himself almost entirely to working as a voice teacher; beginning that work in Turin. He composed the opera Un episodio del San Michele which premiered in Turin on 8 June 1836. He composed a second opera, Graziella, which was never performed.

In 1837 Concone went to Paris where he became a celebrated voice instructor. He taught there for eleven years during which time he published several books on vocal training and technique; some of which have remained in use. He became widely known for his vocal exercises—solfeggi and vocalizzi—which are unusually attractive for works of their kind, and at the same time excellent for their special purpose. Thomaidis and MacPherson describe them as 'lively' works in the Italian tradition of those times. While in Paris he wrote three 'oratorios.' One commentator (named Smither) wrote: "These are quite brief, and include no orchestra but only piano accompaniment. They are evidently intended for performance in a private soiree rather than a theatre. No performance of any of the three is known."

Concone returned to Italy in 1848, probably due to events resulting from the Revolutions of 1848. He was appointed both organist and maestro di cappella of the Sardinian court in Turn; a position he remained in until his death in Turin on September 12, 1861.

Concone also composed some etudes for piano in 25 Melodic Studies, Op. 24., and concert arias and duets.

== List of works by Concone ==
- Fifteen Vocalises for Soprano
- Twenty-Five Lessons for Medium Voice
- Fifty Lessons for High Voice
- Fifty Lessons for Medium Voice, see also here
- Forty Lessons for Bass or Baritone
- Thirty Exercises for the Voice
