= Die Abreise =

Opera by Eugen d'Albert

Die Abreise (The Departure) is a comic opera in one act by composer Eugen d'Albert. The libretto was written by Ferdinand Sporck, a friend of the composer, after a play by August Ernst Steigentesch.

== Composition history ==
Eugen d'Albert composed the opera in 1896. The score was published by Max Brockhaus Musikverlag in 1898, and is now available from Boosey & Hawkes.

== Performance history ==
The opera was first performed 20 October 1898 at the Alte Oper in Frankfurt, under the baton of Ludwig Rottenberg.

== Roles ==
Roles, voice types, premiere cast
Role	Voice type	Premiere cast, 20 October 1898 Conductor: Ludwig Rottenberg
Gilfen, a baron	baritone	Rudolf Brinkman
Luise, his wife	soprano	Hedwig Schacko
Trott, a baron, their friend	tenor	Max Pichler

== Synopsis ==
Time and place: The garden hall of a summer residence in central Germany, at the end of the 18th century.

Gilfen and Luise have been married for many years, and the passion in their relationship has dimmed considerably. Gilfen has been planning to undertake a long journey, but he has postponed his departure every time because he was afraid his wife would take advantage of the situation. And so, he never departed.

Trott, a friend of the couple, is in love with Luise, so it is easily understood why he advises his friend to finally undertake the long planned journey. Gilfen (who has guessed Trott's motives) plays along and takes leave from his wife, faking his departure. Trott immediately seizes the opportunity, but Luise rejects him.

Gilfen then returns to find (much to his surprise and delight) that his wife has been faithful to him. Now it is Trott's turn to leave. Gilfen and Luise finally have time for each other again and they decide to renew their love.

== Recordings ==
In 1998 CPO released a recording made in 1978 at the Ruhrfestspielhaus. János Kulka conducted the Philharmonia Hungarica; the singers were Hermann Prey (Gilfen), Edda Moser (Luise) and Peter Schreier (Trott).
