= Cloppenburg =

- Town
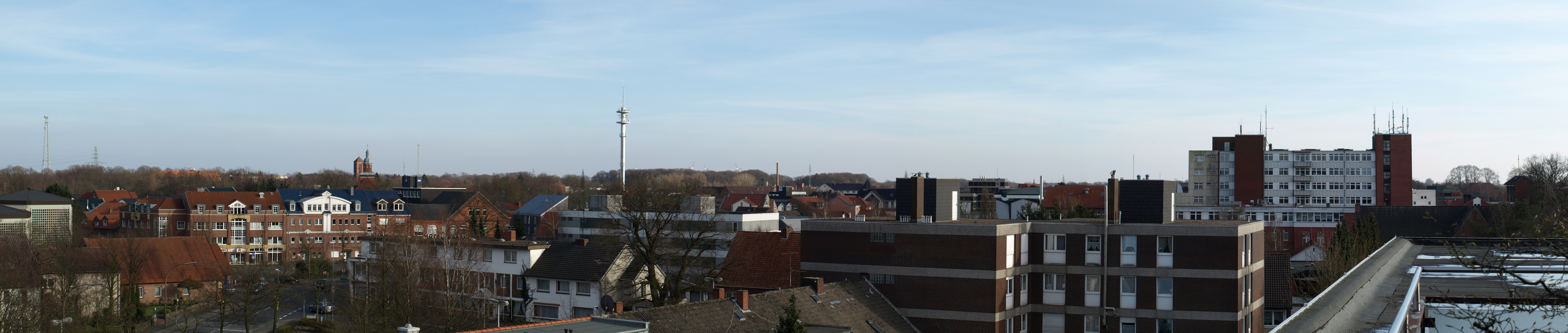
- Panorama of Cloppenburg

- Flag Coat of arms

- Location of Cloppenburg within Cloppenburg district
- Interactive map of Cloppenburg
- Location within Germany Location within Lower Saxony
- Coordinates: 52°51′N 8°3′E
- Country: Germany
- State: Lower Saxony
- District: Cloppenburg

Government
  - Mayor (2021–26): Neidhard Varnhorn (CDU)

Area
  - Total: 70.86 km^{2} (27.36 sq mi)
- Elevation: 39 m (128 ft)

Population (2025-12-31)
  - Total: 36,535
  - Density: 515.6/km^{2} (1,335/sq mi)
- Time zone: UTC+01:00 (CET)
  - Summer (DST): UTC+02:00 (CEST)
- Postal codes: 49661
- Dialling codes: 04471
- Vehicle registration: CLP
- Website: www.cloppenburg.de

Cloppenburg (German: [ˈklɔpm̩ˌbʊʁk]; Low German: Cloppenborg; Saterland Frisian: Kloppenbuurich [ˈklɔpənˌbuːrɪx]) is a town in Lower Saxony, in north-western Germany, capital of Cloppenburg District and part of Oldenburg Münsterland. It lies 38 km south-south-west of Oldenburg in the Weser-Ems region between Bremen and the Dutch border. Cloppenburg is not far from the A1, the major motorway connecting the Ruhr area to Bremen and Hamburg. Another major road is the federal highway B213 being the shortest link from the Netherlands to the A1 and thus to Bremen and Hamburg.

== History ==
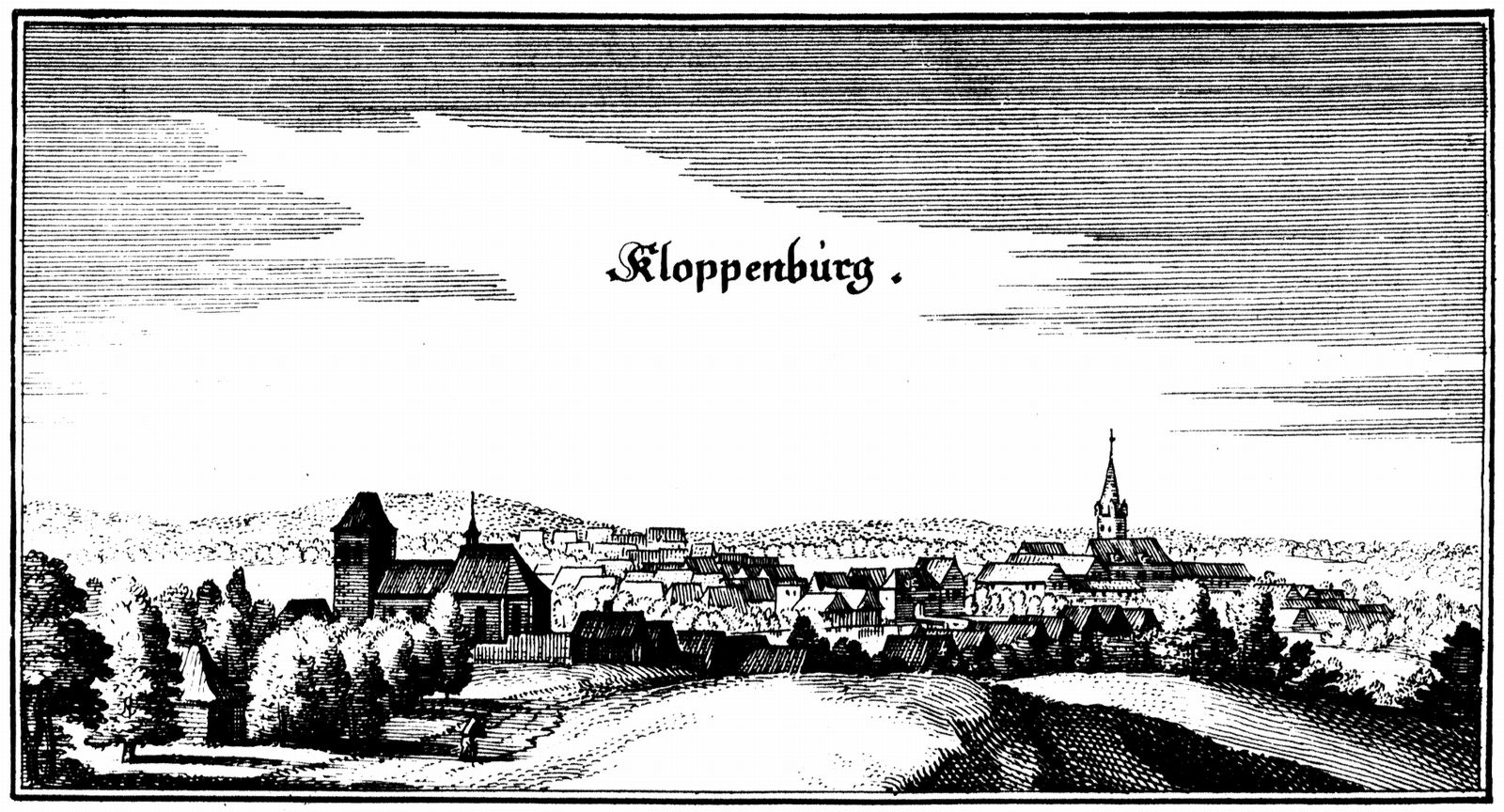
17th-century view of the town

Under Nazi Germany, it was the location of a forced labour subcamp of the prison in Vechta and a camp for Sinti and Romani people (see Romani Holocaust).

The town had strong cultural links with St Munchins Parish in Limerick, Ireland from the 1970s to the 1990s. During this period many groups of teens/young adults from both areas visited and were hosted by families from the other area.

== Economy ==
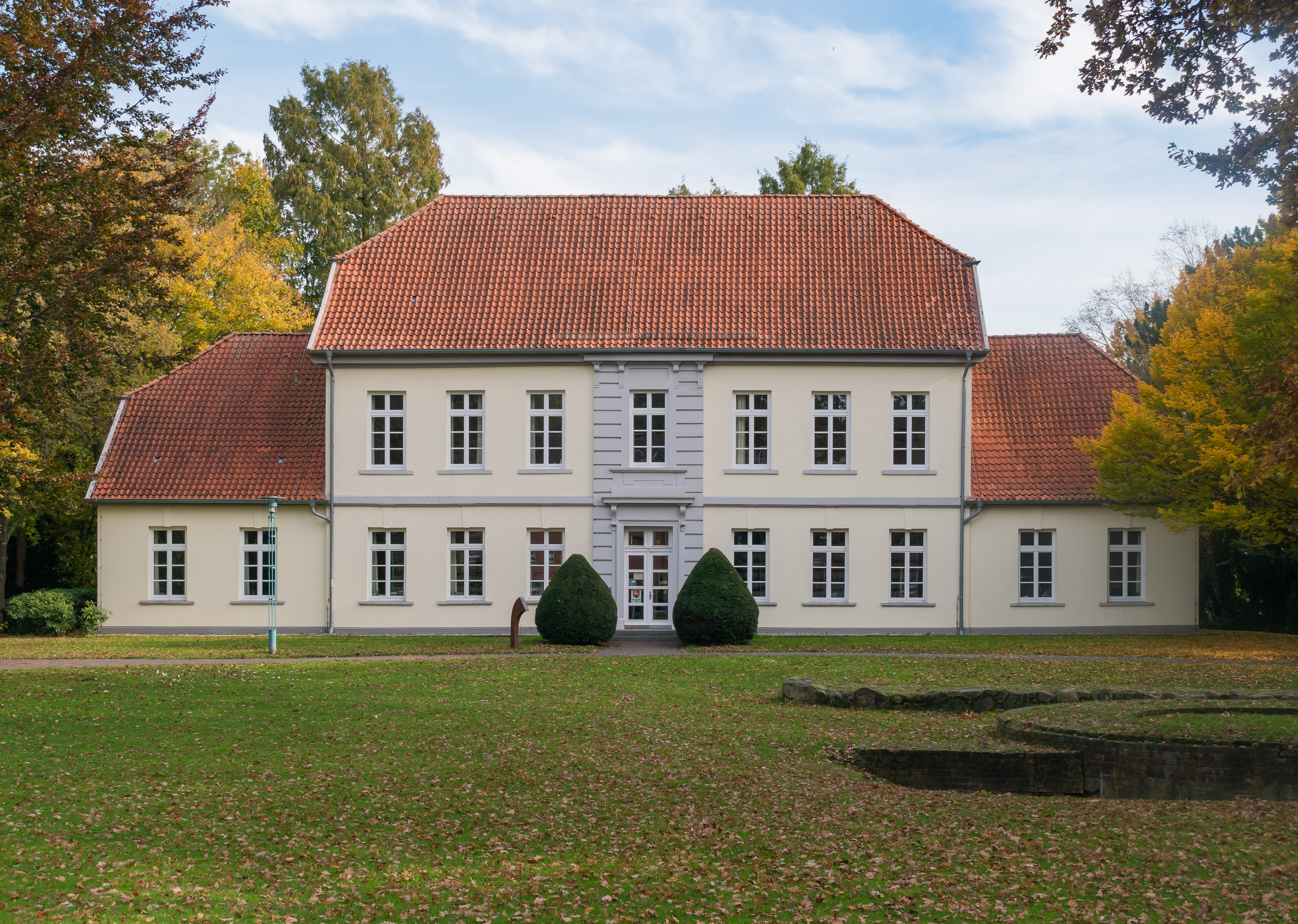
Cloppenburg Castle

The town is a centre for the largely agricultural region of southern Oldenburg. It is the administrative centre of the district and there are many schools.

However, there is also some industry in town: e.g. Lumberg (connector systems) and Derby Cycle (bikes).

== Tourism ==
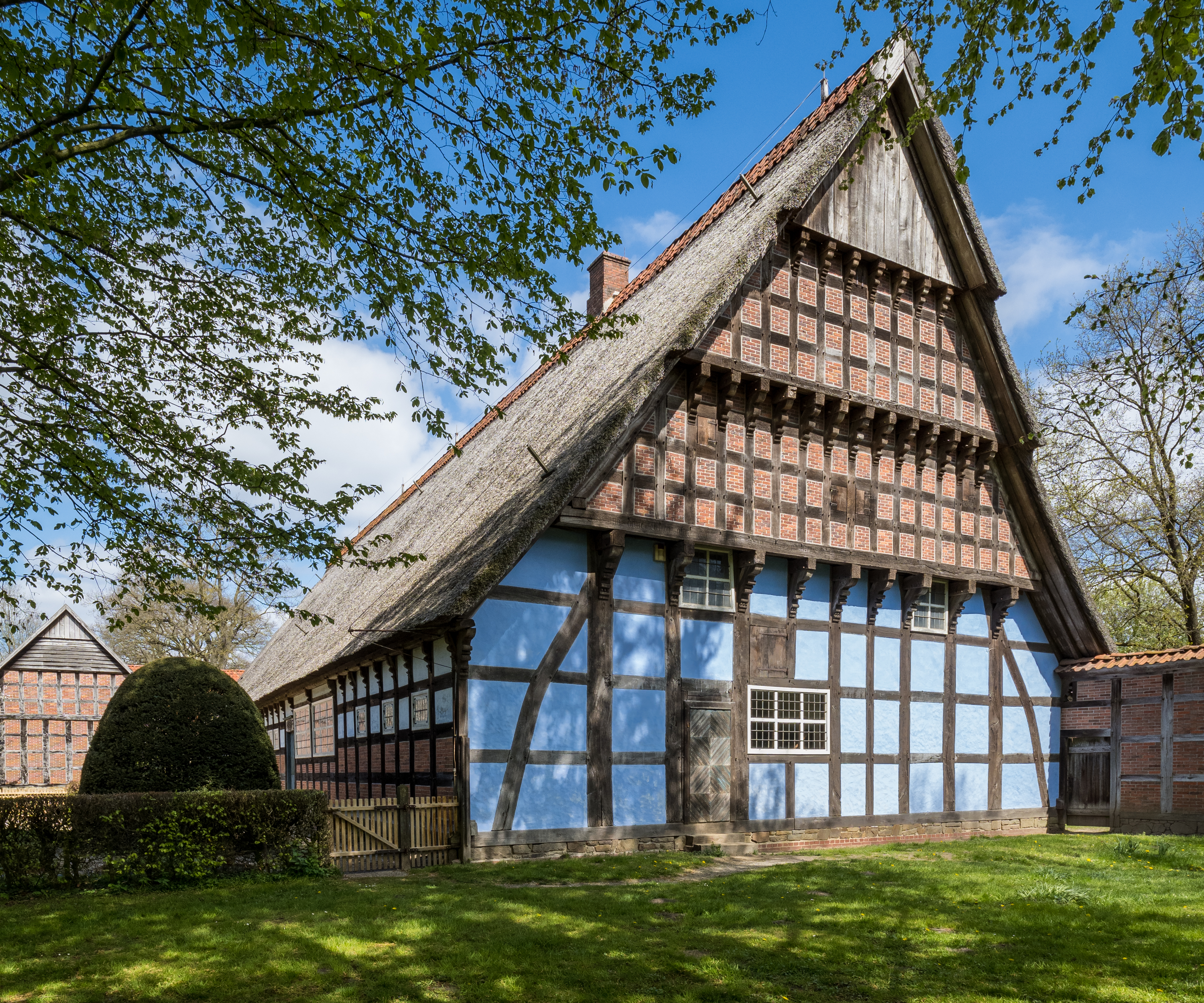
Cloppenburg Museum Village

One of Cloppenburg's main tourist attractions is the Cloppenburg Museum Village, an open-air museum containing a collection of old buildings from the region that were dismantled and reassembled in the museum.

== Sport ==
MSC Cloppenburg are a German motorcycle speedway team who race at the MSC Arena Cloppenburg on Boschstraße.

== Twin town ==
Cloppenburg is twinned with:

- Bernay, France

== Mayors ==
- Ignatz Feigel (1855–1922)
- Bernhard Heukamp (1884–1946)
- Georg Wessling (1889–1974)
- Wolfgang Wiese (2014–2021)
- Neidhard Varnhorn (2021–incumbent)

== Notable people ==
- Werner Baumbach (1916–1953), bomber pilot in World War II
- Laurenz Berges (born 1966), photographer, work focuses on transience
- Heinrich Anton Adolph Cloppenburg (1844–1922), founder of Peek & Cloppenburg
- Jupp Derwall (1927–2007), football player and coach, played more than 275 games
- Günter Dreyer (1943–2019), an Egyptologist at the German Archaeological Institute
- Lena Gercke (born 1988), model, grew up locally
- Bernd Gerdes (born 1989), footballer, played 350 games
- Artjom Gilz (born 1987), actor
- Fanny Moran-Olden (1855–1905), opera singer (soprano)
- Heinrich Timmerevers (born 1952), prelate, the 50th Bishop of Dresden-Meissen since 2016
- Georg Wessling (1889–1974), mayor of Cloppenburg and member of parliament
- Manfred Zapatka (born 1942), actor, graduated from the Clemens-August-Gymnasium Cloppenburg in 1962

== See also ==
- Bethen
- Route of Megalithic Culture
