= Eugen d'Albert =

Scottish-German pianist and composer (1864–1932)

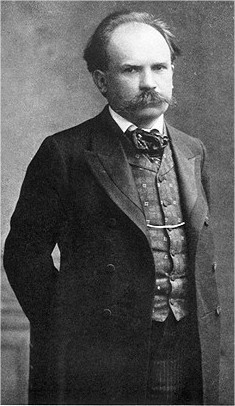
Eugen d'Albert in 1904

Eugen (originally Eugène) Francis Charles d'Albert (10 April 1864 – 3 March 1932) was a Scottish-born pianist and composer who immigrated to Germany and later to Switzerland.

Educated in Britain, d'Albert showed early musical talent and, at the age of seventeen, he won a scholarship to study in Austria. Feeling a kinship with German culture and music, he soon immigrated to Germany, where he studied with Franz Liszt and began a career as a concert pianist. D'Albert repudiated his early training and upbringing in Scotland and considered himself German.

While pursuing his career as a pianist, d'Albert focused increasingly on composing, producing 21 operas and a considerable output of piano, vocal, chamber and orchestral works. His most successful opera was Tiefland, which premiered in Prague in 1903. His successful orchestral works included his cello concerto (1899), a symphony, two string quartets and two piano concertos. In 1907 d'Albert became the director of the Hochschule für Musik in Berlin, where he exerted a wide influence on musical education in Germany. He edited critical editions of the scores of Beethoven and Bach, transcribed Bach's organ works for the piano and wrote cadenzas for Beethoven's piano concertos. He also held the post of Kapellmeister to the Court of Weimar.

D'Albert was married six times, including to the pianist-singer Teresa Carreño, and was successively a British, German and Swiss citizen. His first son was Louis-Albert Salingré.

== Biography ==
=== Early life and education ===
d'Albert aged 20

D'Albert was born at 4 Crescent Place, Glasgow, Scotland, to an English mother, Annie Rowell, and a German-born father of French and Italian descent, Charles Louis Napoléon d'Albert (1809–1886), whose ancestors included the composers Giuseppe Matteo Alberti and Domenico Alberti. D'Albert's father was a pianist, arranger and a prolific composer of salon music who had been ballet-master at the King's Theatre and at Covent Garden. D'Albert was born when his father was 55 years old. The Musical Times wrote in 1904 that "This, and other circumstances, accounted for a certain loneliness in the boy's home-life and the years of his childhood. He was misunderstood, and 'cribbed, cabined, and confined' to such an extent as to largely prejudice him against the country which gave him birth".

D'Albert was brought up in Glasgow and taught music by his father until he won a scholarship to the new National Training School for Music (forerunner of the Royal College of Music) in London, which he entered in 1876 at the age of 12. D'Albert studied at the National Training School with Ernst Pauer, Ebenezer Prout, John Stainer and Arthur Sullivan. By the age of 14, he was winning public praise from The Times as "a bravura player of no mean order" in a concert in October 1878. He played Schumann's Piano Concerto at the Crystal Palace in 1880, receiving more encouragement from The Times: "A finer rendering of the work has seldom been heard." Also in 1880, d'Albert arranged the piano reduction for the vocal score of Sullivan's sacred music drama The Martyr of Antioch, to accompany the chorus in rehearsal. He is also credited with writing, under Sullivan's direction, the overture to Gilbert and Sullivan's 1881 opera, Patience.

For many years d'Albert dismissed his training and work during this period as worthless. The Times wrote that he "was born and educated in England, and won his earliest successes in England, although, in a freak of boyish impetuosity, he repudiated some years ago all connexion with this country, where, according to his own account, he was born by mere accident and where he learnt nothing." In later years, however, he modified his views: "The former prejudice which I had against England, which several incidents aroused, has completely vanished since many years."

=== Career ===
J.S.Bach: Prelude and Fugue in D major, BWV 532
Transcribed for piano by Eugen d'Albert, performed by Martha Goldstein

In 1881 Hans Richter invited d'Albert to play his first piano concerto, which was "received with enthusiasm". This seems to have been d'Albert's lost concerto in A major, not the work published three years later as his Piano Concerto No. 1 in B minor, Op. 2. In the same year d'Albert won the Mendelssohn Scholarship, enabling him to study in Vienna, where he met Johannes Brahms, Franz Liszt and other important musicians who influenced his style. D'Albert, retaining his early enthusiasm for German culture and music ("hearing Tristan und Isolde had a greater influence on him than the education he received from his father or ... at the National Training School for Music") changed his first name from Eugène to Eugen and immigrated to Germany, where he became a pupil of the elderly Liszt in Weimar.

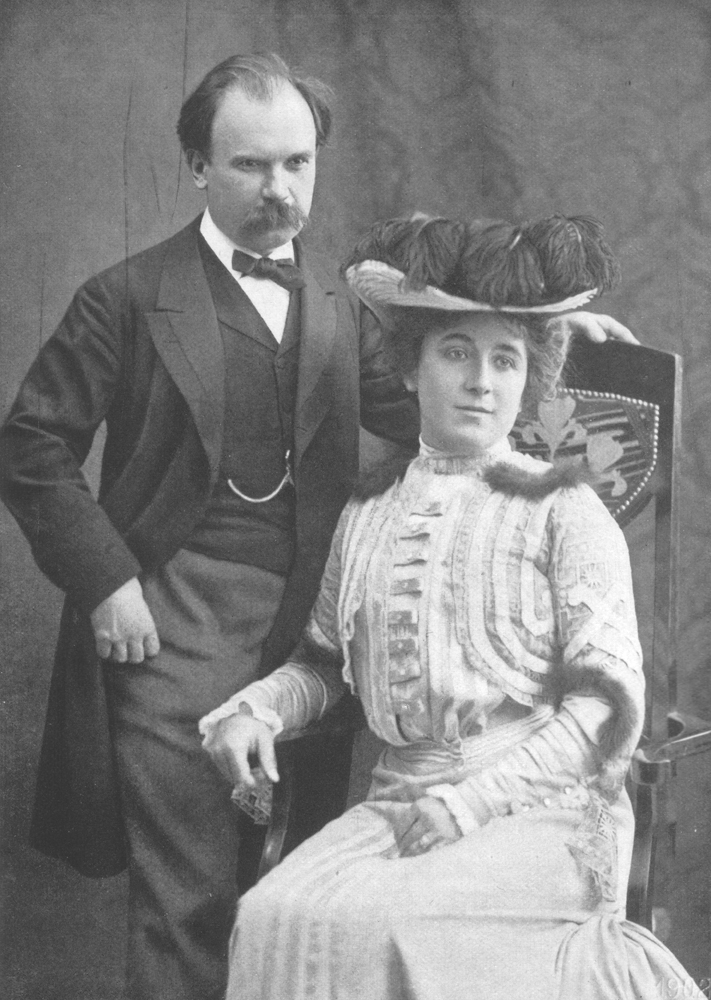
d'Albert and Hermine Finck in 1902

In Germany and Austria d'Albert built a career as a pianist. Liszt called him "the second Tausig", and d'Albert can be heard in an early recording of Liszt works. He played his own piano concerto with the Vienna Philharmonic Orchestra in 1882, the youngest pianist who had appeared with the orchestra. D'Albert toured extensively, including in the United States from 1904 to 1905. His virtuoso technique was compared to that of Busoni. He was praised for his playing of Beethoven's sonatas and J. S. Bach's preludes and fugues, some of which d'Albert transcribed for piano. "As an exponent of Beethoven, Eugen d'Albert has few, if any, equals." Gradually, d'Albert's work as a composer occupied his time more and more, and he reduced his concert playing. He was the recipient of a number of dedications, most notably of Richard Strauss's Burleske in D minor, which he premiered in 1890. In 1907 he became the director of the Hochschule für Musik in Berlin, where, according to The Times, he exerted a wide influence on musical education in Germany. He also held the post of Kapellmeister to the Court of Weimar.

D'Albert was a prolific composer. His output includes a large volume of successful piano and chamber music and lieder. He also composed twenty-one operas, in a wide variety of styles, which premiered mostly in Germany. D'Albert His first, Der Rubin (1893) was an oriental fantasy; Die Abreise (1898), which established him as an opera composer in Germany, was a one-act domestic comedy; Kain (1900) was a setting of the biblical story; and one of his last operas, Der Golem (1926), was on a traditional Jewish theme. His most successful opera was his seventh, Tiefland, which premiered in Prague in 1903. When Thomas Beecham introduced the opera to London, The Times observed, "the scoring owes more than a little to the discipline of Sullivan; there is also a curiously English fragrance". Tiefland played in opera houses throughout the world and has retained a place in the standard German and Austrian repertoire, with a production at the Deutsche Oper Berlin, in November 2007. According to biographer Hugh Macdonald, it "provides a link between Italian verismo and German expressionist opera, although the orchestral textures recall a more Wagnerian language." Another stage success was a comic opera called Flauto solo in 1905. D'Albert's most successful orchestral works included his cello concerto (1899), a symphony, two string quartets and two piano concertos. "Though not a composer of profound originality ... he had an unfailing sense of dramatic appropriateness and all the resources of a symphonic technique to give it expression and was thus able to achieve success in so many styles".

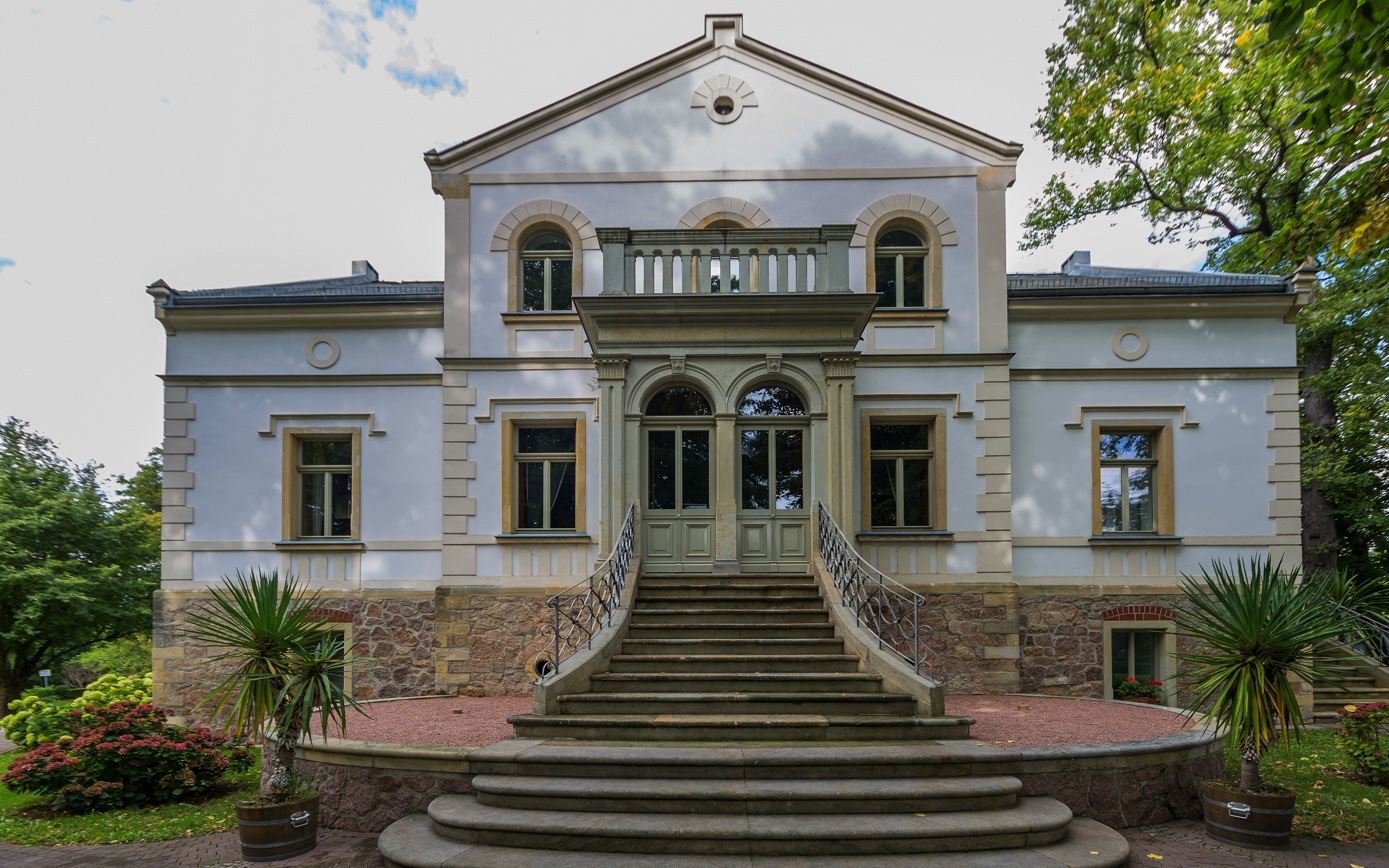
Villa Teresa, Coswig, home of d'Albert and Carreño from 1891 to 1895, now a museum

=== Personal life and death ===
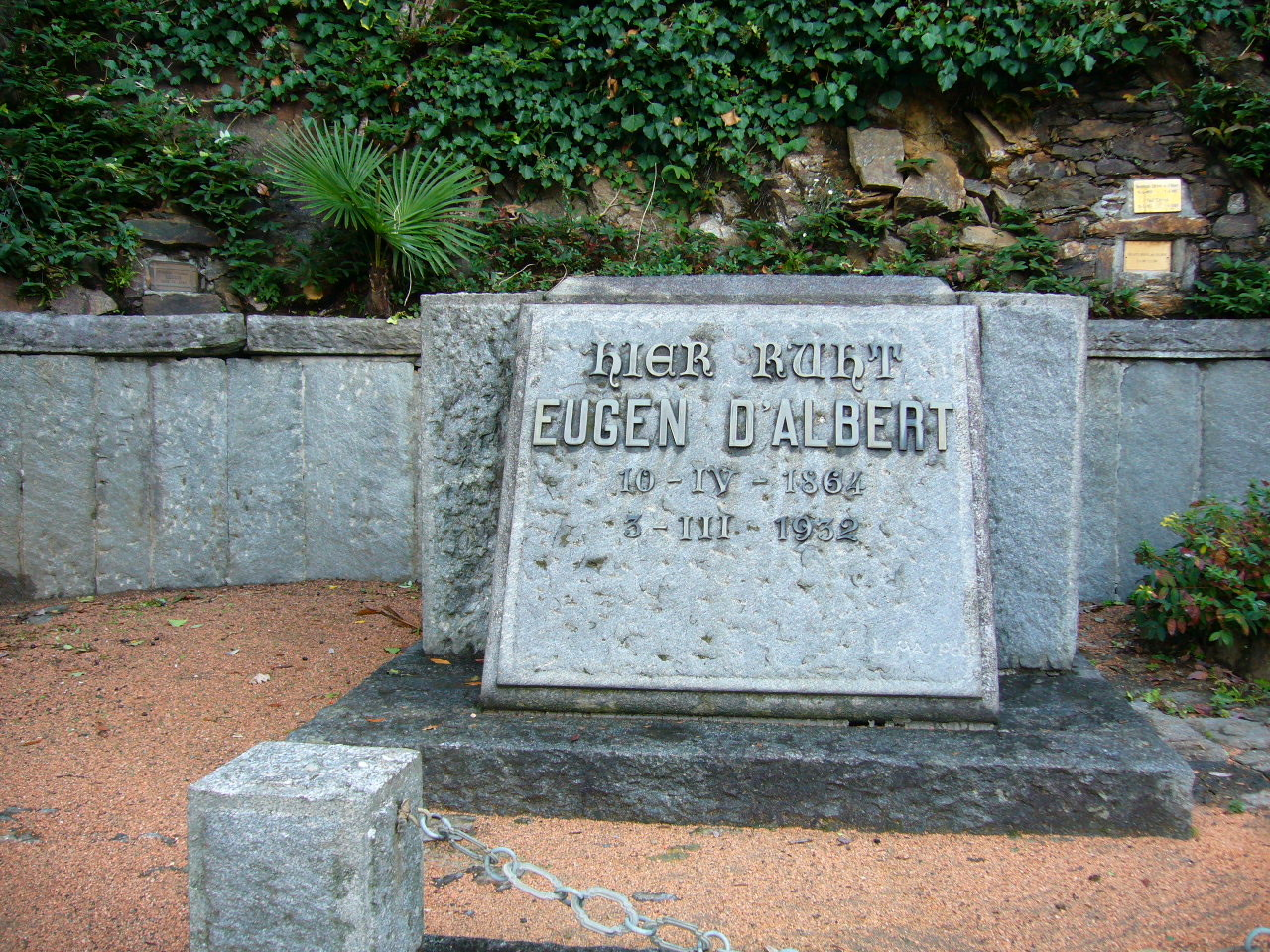
Grave of d'Albert at the cemetery of Morcote

D'Albert's friends included Richard Strauss, Hans Pfitzner, Engelbert Humperdinck, Ignatz Waghalter and Gerhart Hauptmann, the dramatist. He was married six times and had eight children. His first wife was Louise Salingré; their first son was Louis-Albert Salingré. His second wife, from 1892 to 1895, was the Venezuelan pianist, singer and composer Teresa Carreño, who had married several times and was considerably older than d'Albert. D'Albert and Carreño were the subject of a famous joke: "Come quick! Your children and my children are quarrelling again with our children!" The line, however, has also been attributed to others. His later wives were soprano Hermine Finck, who originated the role of the witch in Humperdinck's Hansel and Gretel; actress Ida Fulda; Friederike ("Fritzi") Jauner; and Hilde Fels. His last companion was a mistress, Virginia Zanetti.

In 1914 d'Albert moved to Zurich and became a Swiss citizen, where he continued working through the 1920s. His last opera, Mister Wu, was completed by Leo Blech and premiered posthumously in 1932. He died in 1932 at the age of 67 in Riga, Latvia, where he had travelled for a divorce from his sixth wife. In the weeks preceding his death, d'Albert was the subject of attacks by the press in Riga concerning his personal life. D'Albert was buried in the cemetery overlooking Lake Lugano in Morcote, Switzerland.

== Works ==
=== Operas ===
D'Albert composed twenty-one operas in a variety of styles, which premiered mostly in Germany.

=== Orchestral works ===
- Piano Concerto in G minor (1874)
- Piano Concerto in A major (1881, lost)
- Piano Concerto No. 1 in B minor, Op. 2 (1884)
- Symphony in F major, Op. 4 (1886)
- Esther, Op. 8 (1888)
- Piano Concerto No. 2 in E major, Op. 12 (1893)
- Cello Concerto in C major, Op. 20 (1899)
- Aschenputtel. Suite, Op. 33 (1924)
- Symphonic Prelude to Tiefland, Op. 34 (1924)

=== Keyboard ===
- Suite in D minor for piano, Op. 1 (1883) Musical score
- Eight Piano pieces, Op. 5
- Waltzes for piano, four hands, Op. 6 Musical score
- Piano sonata in F♯ minor, Op. 10 (1893)
- Klavierstücke, Op. 16

=== Chamber works ===
- String Quartet No. 1 in A minor, Op. 7 (1887)
- String Quartet No. 2 in E♭ major, Op. 11 (1893)

=== Vocal music ===
- Der Mensch und das Leben, Op. 14 (1893)
- Seejungfräulein, Op. 15 (1897)
- Wie wir die Natur erleben, Op. 24 (1903)
- Mittelalterliche Venushymne, Op. 26 (1904)
- An den Genius von Deutschland, Op. 30 (1904)
- d'Albert also wrote total of 58 lieder for voice and piano, published in 10 volumes

== Recordings ==
As pianist, d'Albert did not record extensively, although his recordings represent a wide range of music. They include his own Scherzo, Op. 16; Capriolen, Op. 32; Suite, Op. 1, Gavotte and Minuet; and piano arrangements from his opera Die toten Augen (1916). He made several Beethoven recordings, including the Piano Sonatas Nos. 18 and 21 ("Waldstein"), and the "Spring" Sonata for violin and piano (with Andreas Weißgerber). A selection of Chopin pieces were recorded in the 1910s and 1920s, with études, polonaises and waltzes represented. Perhaps surprisingly, his teacher Liszt is not strongly represented among d'Albert's recordings, though he committed "Au bord d'une source" from Années de pèlerinage (1st year) to disc in 1916. Brahms, Mozart, Schubert and Weber also feature in his discography.

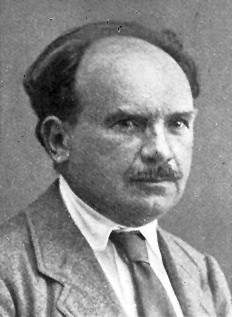

As a composer, d'Albert has been more widely represented on record in recent decades than previously. Some modern recordings include:

- Die Abreise
  - Hermann Prey; Edda Moser; Peter Schreier; Philharmonia Hungarica/János Kulka
- Piano Concertos No. 1 in B minor, Op. 2, and No. 2 in E major, Op. 12
  - Piers Lane/BBC Scottish Symphony Orchestra/Alun Francis
  - Joseph Banowetz/ Moscow Symphony Orchestra/ Dmitry Yablonsky
- Piano Sonata in F-sharp minor, Op. 10; Klavierstücke, Op. 16; Heft 1 and Heft 2, Serenata and Capriolen Fünf schlichte Klavierstücke
  - Piers Lane
- String Quartets No. 1 in A minor, Op. 7, and No. 2 in E-flat, Op. 11
  - Sarastro Quartet
- Suite in Fünf Sätzen, Op.1, Impromptu in D flat Major, Albumblatt in D flat Major, Vier Klavierstücke, Op.16
  - Sofja Gülbadamova
- Tiefland
  - Éva Marton; René Kollo; Bernd Weikl; Kurt Moll; Münchner Rundfunkorchester/Marek Janowski
  - Margherita Kenney; Waldemar Kmentt; Otto Wiener; Vienna Symphony Orchestra/ F. Charles Adler
  - Lisa Gasteen; Johan Botha; Falk Struckmann; Vienna Radio Symphony Orchestra/ Bertrand de Billy
