= Glyndebourne Festival Opera: history and repertoire, 1934–51 =

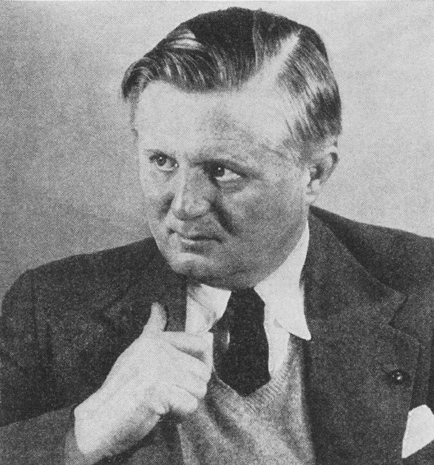
Fritz Busch, 1930.

This is a list of the operas performed by Glyndebourne Festival Opera during the music directorship (1934-1951) of Fritz Busch. Operas performed at venues other than Glyndebourne by Glyndebourne forces are also included, as are operas performed at Glyndebourne by other companies.

Year	Opera	Composer	Principal cast	Conductor	Director	Designer
1934	The Marriage of Figaro	Mozart	Willi Domgraf-Fassbänder (Figaro), Audrey Mildmay (Susanna), Roy Henderson (Count), Aulikki Rautawaara (Countess), Luise Helletsgruber (Lucie Manén) (Cherubino)	Fritz Busch	Carl Ebert	Hamish Wilson/Ann Litherland
1934	Così fan tutte	Mozart	Ina Souez (Fiordiligi), Luise Helletsgruber (Dorabella), Heddle Nash (Ferrando), Willi Domgraf-Fassbänder (Guglielmo), Irene Eisinger (Despina), Vincenzo Bettoni (Don Alfonso)	Fritz Busch	Carl Ebert	Hamish Wilson/Ann Litherland
1935	The Marriage of Figaro	Mozart	Willi Domgraf-Fassbänder (Figaro), Audrey Mildmay (Susanna), Roy Henderson (Count), Aulikki Rautawaara (Countess), Luise Helletsgruber (Cherubino)	Fritz Busch/Hans Oppenheim	Revival of 1934 production	
1935	Die Entführung aus dem Serail	Mozart	Noël Eadie (Konstanze), Walther Ludwig (Belmonte), Ivar Andrésen (Osmin), Irene Eisinger (Blonde), Heddle Nash (Pedrillo)	Fritz Busch	Carl Ebert	Hamish Wilson/Ann Litherland
1935	The Magic Flute	Mozart	Walther Ludwig (Tamino), Aulikki Rautawaara (Pamina), Willi Domgraf-Fassbänder (Papageno), Ivar Andrésen (Sarastro), Mìla Kočová/Noël Eadie (Queen of the Night)	Fritz Busch	Carl Ebert	Hamish Wilson
1935	Così fan tutte	Mozart	Ina Souez (Fiordiligi), Luise Helletsgruber (Dorabella), Heddle Nash (Ferrando), Willi Domgraf-Fassbänder (Guglielmo), Irene Eisinger (Despina), John Brownlee (Don Alfonso)	Fritz Busch	Revival of 1934 production	
1936	Don Giovanni	Mozart	John Brownlee (Don Giovanni), Ina Souez (Donna Anna), Luise Helletsgruber (Donna Elvira), Salvatore Baccaloni (Leporello), Koloman von Pataky (Don Ottavio)	Fritz Busch	Carl Ebert	Hamish Wilson/Hein Heckroth
1936	The Marriage of Figaro	Mozart	Mariano Stabile (Figaro), Audrey Mildmay (Susanna), John Brownlee (Count), Aulikki Rautawaara (Countess), Luise Helletsgruber (Cherubino)	Fritz Busch	Revival of 1934 production	
1936	Die Entführung aus dem Serail	Mozart	Julia Moor (Konstanze), Koloman von Pataky (Belmonte), Salvatore Baccaloni (Osmin), Irma Beilke (Blonde), Heddle Nash (Pedrillo)	Fritz Busch	Revival of 1935 production	
1936	Così fan tutte	Mozart	Ina Souez (Fiordiligi), Luise Helletsgruber (Dorabella), Heddle Nash (Ferrando), Roy Henderson (Guglielmo), Tatiana Menotti (Despina), John Brownlee (Don Alfonso)	Fritz Busch	Revival of 1934 production	
1936	The Magic Flute	Mozart	Thorkild Noval (Tamino), Aulikki Rautawaara (Pamina), Roy Henderson (Papageno), Alexander Kipnis (Sarastro), Noël Eadie/Julia Moor (Queen of the Night)	Fritz Busch/Hans Oppenheim	Revival of 1935 production	
1937	Don Giovanni	Mozart	John Brownlee (Don Giovanni), Ina Souez (Donna Anna), Luise Helletsgruber (Donna Elvira), Salvatore Baccaloni (Leporello), Dino Borgioli (Don Ottavio)	Fritz Busch	Revival of 1936 production	
1937	Die Entführung aus dem Serail	Mozart	Margherita Perras (Konstanze), Eric Starling (Belmonte), Herbert Alsen (Osmin), Irene Eisinger (Blonde), Heddle Nash (Pedrillo)	Fritz Busch	Revival of 1935 production	
1937	Così fan tutte	Mozart	Ina Souez (Fiordiligi), Luise Helletsgruber (Dorabella), Heddle Nash (Ferrando), Willi Domgraf-Fassbänder/Roy Henderson (Guglielmo), Irene Eisinger (Despina), John Brownlee/Salvatore Baccaloni (Don Alfonso)	Fritz Busch	Revival of 1934 production	
1937	The Marriage of Figaro	Mozart	Willi Domgraf-Fassbänder (Figaro), Irene Eisinger (Susanna), John Brownlee (Count), Aulikki Rautawaara (Countess), Marita Farell (Cherubino)	Fritz Busch	Revival of 1934 production	
1937	The Magic Flute	Mozart	Thorkild Noval (Tamino), Aulikki Rautawaara (Pamina), Roy Henderson (Papageno), Herbert Alsen/David Franklin (Sarastro), Sinäda Lissitschkina (Queen of the Night)	Fritz Busch	Revival of 1935 production	
1938	Macbeth	Verdi	Francesco Valentino (Macbeth), Vera Schwarz (Lady Macbeth), David Lloyd (Macduff)	Fritz Busch	Carl Ebert	Caspar Neher
1938	Don Giovanni	Mozart	John Brownlee (Don Giovanni), Ina Souez (Donna Anna), Luise Helletsgruber (Donna Elvira), Salvatore Baccaloni (Leporello), Dino Borgioli (Don Ottavio)	Fritz Busch/Alberto Erede	Revival of 1936 production	
1938	Così fan tutte	Mozart	Ina Souez (Fiordiligi), Luise Helletsgruber (Dorabella), Heddle Nash (Ferrando), Roy Henderson (Guglielmo), Irene Eisinger (Despina), John Brownlee (Don Alfonso)	Fritz Busch	Revival of 1934 production	
1938	The Marriage of Figaro	Mozart	Mariano Stabile (Figaro), Audrey Mildmay/Irene Eisinger (Susanna), John Brownlee (Count), Aulikki Rautawaara (Countess), Marita Farell (Cherubino)	Fritz Busch/Alberto Erede	Revival of 1934 production	
1938	Don Pasquale	Donizetti	Salvatore Baccaloni (Pasquale), Dino Borgioli (Ernesto), Audrey Mildmay (Norina), Mariano Stabile (Malatesta)	Fritz Busch	Carl Ebert	Hamish Wilson/Kenneth Green
1939	Don Giovanni	Mozart	John Brownlee (Don Giovanni), Ina Souez (Donna Anna), Hella Toros (Donna Elvira), Salvatore Baccaloni (Leporello), David Lloyd/Dino Borgioli (Don Ottavio)	Fritz Busch/Alberto Erede	Revival of 1936 production	
1939	Don Pasquale	Donizetti	Salvatore Baccaloni (Pasquale), Luigi Fort (Ernesto), Audrey Mildmay (Norina), Mariano Stabile (Malatesta)	Fritz Busch	Revival of 1938 production	
1939	Macbeth	Verdi	Francesco Valentino (Macbeth), Margherita Grandi (Lady Macbeth), David Lloyd (Macduff)	Fritz Busch	Revival of 1938 production	
1939	Così fan tutte	Mozart	Ina Souez (Fiordiligi), Risë Stevens (Dorabella), Gino del Signore (Ferrando), Roy Henderson (Guglielmo), Irene Eisinger (Despina), John Brownlee (Don Alfonso)	Fritz Busch	Revival of 1934 production	
1939	The Marriage of Figaro	Mozart	Mariano Stabile (Figaro), Audrey Mildmay/Irene Eisinger (Susanna), John Brownlee (Count), María Markan (Countess), Risë Stevens (Cherubino)	Fritz Busch/Alberto Erede	Revival of 1934 production	
1940	The Beggar's Opera	Pepusch	Michael Redgrave (Macheath), Audrey Mildmay/Irene Eisinger (Polly), Roy Henderson (Peachum), Constance Willis/Elsie French (Mrs Peachum), Joseph Farrington (Lockit), Linda Gray (Lucy)	Frederic Austin/Anthony Bernard/Michael Mudie	John Gielgud	Motley
1941/5	No Festival - theatre closed during World War II					
1946	The Rape of Lucretia	Britten	Kathleen Ferrier/Nancy Evans (Lucretia), Otakar Kraus/Frank Rogier (Tarquinius), Peter Pears/Aksel Schiøtz (Male Chorus), Joan Cross/Flora Nielson (Female Chorus), Norman Walker/Owen Brannigan (Collatinus), Edmund Donlevy/Frederick Sharp (Junius)	Ernest Ansermet/Reginald Goodall/Hans Oppenheim/Benjamin Britten	Eric Crozier	John Piper
1947	Orfeo ed Euridice	Gluck	Kathleen Ferrier (Orfeo), Ann Ayars (Euridice), Zoë Vlachopoulos	Fritz Stiedry	Carl Ebert	Joseph Carl
1947	Albert Herring	Britten	Peter Pears (Albert), Joan Cross (Lady Billows), Frederick Sharp/Denis Dowling (Sid), Nancy Evans/Catherine Lawson (Nancy), Betsy de la Porte (Mrs Herring)	Benjamin Britten/Ivan Clayton	Frederick Ashton	John Piper
1947	Macbeth	Verdi	Francesco Valentino (Macbeth), Margherita Grandi (Lady Macbeth), Walter Midgley (Macduff)	Berthold Goldschmidt	Revival of 1938 production	
1947	The Marriage of Figaro	Mozart	Italo Tajo (Figaro), Tatiana Menotti/Ayhan Alnar (Susanna), John Brownlee (Count), Eleanor Steber (Countess), Giulietta Simionato (Cherubino)	Walter Susskind/Renato Cellini	Revival of 1934 production	
1948	Don Giovanni	Mozart	Paolo Silveri (Don Giovanni), Ljuba Welitsch (Donna Anna), Christina Carroll (Donna Elvira), Vito de Taranto (Leporello), Richard Lewis (Don Ottavio)	Rafael Kubelik	Revival of 1936 production	
1948	Così fan tutte	Mozart	Suzanne Danco (Fiordiligi), Eugenia Zareska (Dorabella), Petre Munteanu (Ferrando), Erich Kunz (Guglielmo), Hilde Güden (Despina), Mariano Stabile (Don Alfonso)	Vittorio Gui	Carl Ebert	Rolf Gérard
1949	Un ballo in maschera	Verdi	Mirto Picchi (Riccardo), Ljuba Welitsch/Margherita Grandi (Amelia), Paolo Silveri (Renato), Alda Noni (Oscar), Jean Watson/Amalia Pini (Ulrica)	Vittorio Gui/Hans Oppenheim	Carl Ebert	Caspar Neher
1949	Così fan tutte	Mozart	Suzanne Danco (Fiordiligi), Sena Jurinac (Dorabella), Petre Munteanu (Ferrando), Marko Rothmüller (Guglielmo), Irene Eisinger (Despina), John Brownlee (Don Alfonso)	Vittorio Gui/Hans Oppenheim	Revival of 1948 production	
1950	Die Entführung aus dem Serail	Mozart	Ilse Hollweg (Konstanze), Richard Holm (Belmonte), Endre Koréh (Osmin), Alda Noni (Blonde), Murray Dickie (Pedrillo)	Fritz Busch	Carl Ebert	Rolf Gérard
1950	Così fan tutte	Mozart	Sena Jurinac (Fiordiligi), Blanche Thebom (Dorabella), Richard Lewis (Ferrando), Erich Kunz/Geraint Evans (Guglielmo), Alda Noni (Despina), Mario Borriello (Don Alfonso)	Fritz Busch	Revival of 1948 production	
1950	The Marriage of Figaro	Mozart	George London (Figaro), Elfride Troetschel (Susanna), Marko Rothmüller (Count), Clara Ebers (Countess), Sena Jurinac (Cherubino)	Ferenc Fricsay	Carl Ebert	Rolf Gérard
1950	Ariadne auf Naxos	Strauss	Hilde Zadek (Ariadne), Ilse Hollweg (Zerbinetta), Peter Anders (Bacchus), Douglas Craig (Harlekin)	Thomas Beecham	Carl Ebert	Oliver Messel
1951	Idomeneo	Mozart	Richard Lewis (Idomeneo), Léopold Simoneau (Idamante), Sena Jurinac (Ilia), Birgit Nilsson (Elettra)	Fritz Busch/John Pritchard	Carl Ebert	Oliver Messel
1951	The Marriage of Figaro	Mozart	Alois Pernerstorfer (Figaro), Genevieve Warner (Susanna), Alfred Poell (Count), Lisa della Casa (Countess), Dorothy MacNeil (Cherubino)	Fritz Busch/John Pritchard	Revival of 1950 production	
1951	Così fan tutte	Mozart	Sena Jurinac (Fiordiligi), Alice Howland (Dorabella), Richard Lewis (Ferrando), Marko Rothmüller (Guglielmo), Isa Quensel (Despina), Sesto Bruscantini (Don Alfonso)	Fritz Busch/John Pritchard	Revival of 1948 production	
1951	Don Giovanni	Mozart	Mario Petri (Don Giovanni), Hilde Zadek (Donna Anna), Suzanne Danco (Donna Elvira), Alois Pernerstorfer (Leporello), Léopold Simoneau (Don Ottavio)	Fritz Busch/John Pritchard	Carl Ebert	John Piper
1951	La forza del destino	Verdi	Walburga Wegner (Leonora), David Poleri (Don Alvaro), Marko Rothmüller (Don Carlo), Bruce Dargavel (Padre Guardiano), Mildred Miller (Preziosilla), Owen Brannigan (Fra Melitone)	Fritz Busch	Carl Ebert	Leslie Hurry
1951	Don Giovanni	Mozart	Mario Petri (Don Giovanni), Hilde Zadek (Donna Anna), Dorothy MacNeil (Donna Elvira), Alois Pernerstorfer/Owen Brannigan (Leporello), Léopold Simoneau (Don Ottavio)	Fritz Busch/John Pritchard	Revival of 1951 Glyndebourne production	

== Sources ==
- Norwich, John Julius (1985). Fifty Years of Glyndebourne. London: Jonathan Cape. ISBN 0-224-02310-1.

== See also ==
- Glyndebourne Festival Opera: history and repertoire 1952-1963
