= Don Giovanni discography =

- Complete recording (4 hours), introduction starts at 1:55, music at 6:40 – via Internet Archive

This is a partial discography of Wolfgang Amadeus Mozart's opera Don Giovanni.

== Audio recordings ==
| Year | Cast (Don Giovanni Leporello Donna Anna Don Ottavio Donna Elvira Zerlina Masetto Commendatore) | Conductor, Opera house and orchestra | Label |
|---|---|---|---|
| 1934 | Ezio Pinza; Virgilio Lazzari; Rosa Ponselle; Tito Schipa; Maria Müller; Edytha Fleischer; Louis D'Angelo; Emanuel List | Tullio Serafin; Metropolitan Opera orchestra and chorus | CD: Andromeda; Cat: ANDRCD 9026 |
| 1936 | John Brownlee; Salvatore Baccaloni; Ina Souez; Koloman von Pataky; Luise Helletsgruber; Audrey Mildmay; Roy Henderson; David Franklin | Fritz Busch; Glyndebourne Festival orchestra and chorus | 78 rpm: His Master's Voice; Cat: DB 2961–2983; LP: RCA Victor; Cat: DM 423/424/425; CD: Naxos; Cat: 8.110135-37 |
| 1937 | Ezio Pinza; Virgilio Lazzari; Elisabeth Rethberg; Dino Borgioli; Luise Helletsgruber; Margit Bokor; Karl Ettl; Herbert Alsen | Bruno Walter; Vienna Philharmonic | CD: Andromeda; Cat: ANDRCD 5126 |
| 1942 | Ezio Pinza; Alexander Kipnis; Rose Bampton; Charles Kullman; Jarmila Novotná; Bidu Sayão; Mack Harrell; Norman Cordon | Bruno Walter; Metropolitan Opera orchestra and chorus | CD: Andromeda; Cat: ANDRCD 9040; CD: Naxos; Cat: 8.110013-4 |
| 1944 | Ezio Pinza; Salvatore Baccaloni; Florence Kirk; Charles Kullman; Eleanor Steber; Bidu Sayão; Mack Harrell; Nicola Moscona | George Szell; Metropolitan Opera orchestra and chorus | CD: Walhall; Cat: WLCD 0106 |
| 1947 | Ezio Pinza; Salvatore Baccaloni; Regina Resnik; Charles Kullman; Polyna Stoska; Nadine Conner; Lorenzo Alvary; Jerome Hines | Max Rudolf; Metropolitan Opera orchestra and chorus | CD: Omega; Cat: 648 |
| 1950 | Tito Gobbi; Erich Kunz; Ljuba Welitsch; Anton Dermota; Elisabeth Schwarzkopf; Irmgard Seefried; Alfred Poell; Josef Greindl | Wilhelm Furtwängler; Vienna Philharmonic | CD: EMI Classics; Cat: 0094633679924 |
| 1953 | Cesare Siepi; Otto Edelmann; Elisabeth Grümmer; Anton Dermota; Elisabeth Schwarzkopf; Erna Berger; Walter Berry; Raffaele Arié | Wilhelm Furtwängler; Vienna Philharmonic; Konzertvereinigung Wiener Staatsopernchor (recorded at Salzburg Festival) | CD: Orfeo; Cat: C 624 043 D |
| 1954 | Cesare Siepi; Otto Edelmann; Elisabeth Grümmer; Anton Dermota; Elisabeth Schwarzkopf; Erna Berger; Walter Berry; Dezső Ernster | Wilhelm Furtwängler; Vienna Philharmonic orchestra and chorus | CD: EMI Classics; Cat: 336 799–2 |
| 1955 | Cesare Siepi; Fernando Corena; Suzanne Danco; Anton Dermota; Lisa Della Casa; Hilde Güden; Walter Berry; Kurt Böhme | Josef Krips; Vienna Philharmonic; Vienna State Opera chorus | CD: Decca Records; Cat: 478 1389 |
| 1955 | Giuseppe Taddei; Italo Tajo; Mary Curtis Verna; Cesare Valletti; Carla Gavazzi; Elda Ribetti; Vito Susca; Antonio Zerbini | Max Rudolf; RAI Orchestra Sinfonica and chorus | LP: Everest; Cat: S-403/3; CD: Warner-Fonit; Cat: 0927 43561–2 |
| 1955 | George London; Erich Kunz; Lisa Della Casa; Anton Dermota; Sena Jurinac; Irmgard Seefried; Walter Berry; Ludwig Weber | Karl Böhm; Vienna State Opera orchestra and chorus (sung in German) | CD: RCA Red Seal; Cat: 74321 57737 2 |
| 1955 | George London; Walter Berry; Hilde Zadek; Léopold Simoneau; Sena Jurinac; Graziella Sciutti; Eberhard Wächter; Ludwig Weber | Rudolf Moralt; Vienna Symphony; Wiener Kammerchor | CD: Philips; Cat: 438 674–2 |
| 1955 | George London; Benno Kusche; Hilde Zadek; Léopold Simoneau; Maud Cunitz; Rita Streich; Horst Günter; Ludwig Weber | Otto Klemperer; Kölner Rundfunkchor; Kölner Rundfunk Sinfonie Orchester (recorded on 27 may 1955 in Köln) | Archiphon; ARC-WU 2055 |
| 1956 | Antonio Campo; Marcello Curtis; Teresa Stich-Randall; Nicolai Gedda; Suzanne Danco; Anna Moffo; André Vessières; Raffaele Arié | Hans Rosbaud; Orchestre de la Société des Concerts du Conservatoire; Festival d'Aix-en-Provence chorus | CD: EMI Classics; Cat: 7243 5 72195 2 5 (with Le Nozze di Figaro) |
| 1958 | Dietrich Fischer-Dieskau; Karl-Christian Kohn; Sena Jurinac; Ernst Haefliger; Maria Stader; Irmgard Seefried; Ivan Sardi; Walter Kreppel | Ferenc Fricsay; Deutsches Symphonie-Orchester Berlin | CD: Deutsche Grammophon; Cat: 000289 463 6292 1 |
| 1959 | Eberhard Wächter, Giuseppe Taddei, Joan Sutherland, Luigi Alva, Elisabeth Schwarzkopf, Graziella Sciutti, Piero Cappuccilli, Gottlob Frick | Carlo Maria Giulini, Philharmonia Orchestra and chorus | CD: EMI Classics; Cat: 747260–8 For details, see Don Giovanni (Giulini recording) |
| 1959 | Cesare Siepi; Fernando Corena; Birgit Nilsson; Cesare Valletti; Leontyne Price; Eugenia Ratti; Heinz Blankenburg; Arnold van Mill | Erich Leinsdorf; Vienna Philharmonic | CD: London; Cat: 444594 |
| 1959 | George London; Ezio Flagello; Eleanor Steber; Cesare Valletti; Lisa Della Casa; Laurel Hurley; Theodor Uppman; William Wilderman | Karl Böhm; Metropolitan Opera orchestra and chorus | CD: The Met Guild; Cat: |
| 1960 | Eberhard Wächter; Walter Berry; Leontyne Price; Cesare Valletti; Elisabeth Schwarzkopf; Graziella Sciutti; Rolando Panerai; Nicola Zaccaria | Herbert von Karajan; Vienna Philharmonic; Konzertvereinigung Wiener Staatsopernchor (recorded at Salzburg Festival) | CD: MYTO; Cat: 00317 |
| 1962 | George London; Benno Kusche; Hildegard Hillebrecht; Nicolai Gedda; Sena Jurinac; Anneliese Rothenberger; Albrecht Peter; Gottlob Frick | Joseph Keilberth; Munich Opera Festival | CD: Golden Melodram; Cat: |
| 1966 | Nicolai Ghiaurov; Walter Berry; Claire Watson; Nicolai Gedda; Christa Ludwig; Mirella Freni; Paolo Montarsolo; Franz Crass | Otto Klemperer; Philharmonia Orchestra | CD: EMI Classics; Cat: 77776384153 |
| 1967 | Dietrich Fischer-Dieskau; Ezio Flagello; Birgit Nilsson; Peter Schreier; Martina Arroyo; Reri Grist; Alfredo Mariotti; Martti Talvela | Karl Böhm; Prague National Theatre Orchestra | CD: Deutsche Grammophon; Cat: DG 429 870–2 |
| 1968 | Gabriel Bacquier; Donald Gramm; Joan Sutherland; Werner Krenn; Pilar Lorengar; Marilyn Horne; Leonardo Monreale; Clifford Grant | Richard Bonynge; English Chamber Orchestra | CD: Decca; Cat: |
| 1970 | Nicolai Ghiaurov; Geraint Evans; Gundula Janowitz; Stuart Burrows; Teresa Żylis-Gara; Olivera Miljakovic; Rolando Panerai; Victor von Halem | Herbert von Karajan; Vienna Philharmonic; Konzertvereinigung Wiener Staatsopernchor (recorded at Salzburg Festival) | CD: Orfeo; Cat: C 615 033 D |
| 1970 | Nicolai Ghiaurov, Sesto Bruscantini; Gundula Janowitz; Alfredo Kraus; Sena Jurinac; Olivera Miljakovic; Walter Monachesi; Dimiter Petkov | Carlo Maria Giulini; RAI Symphony orchestra and chorus (recorded on 12 May 1970 in Rome) | CD: Opera Hommage; Cat: 7001835 |
| 1973 | Ingvar Wixell; Wladimiro Ganzarolli; Martina Arroyo; Stuart Burrows; Kiri Te Kanawa; Mirella Freni; Richard Van Allan; Luigi Roni | Sir Colin Davis; Royal Opera House orchestra and chorus | CD: Philips; Cat: 422 541–2 |
| 1977 | Sherrill Milnes; Walter Berry; Anna Tomowa-Sintow; Peter Schreier; Teresa Żylis-Gara; Edith Mathis; Dale Duesing; John Macurdy | Karl Böhm; Vienna Philharmonic; Vienna State Opera chorus | CD: Deutsche Grammophon; Cat: DG 477 5655 |
| 1978 | Bernd Weikl; Gabriel Bacquier; Margaret Price; Stuart Burrows; Sylvia Sass; Lucia Popp; Alfred Šramek; Kurt Moll | Georg Solti; London Philharmonic Orchestra; London Opera Chorus; Jeffrey Tate (harpsichord) | LPs: Decca D164D4 (recorded at the Kingsway Hall in October and November 1978) |
| 1983 | Thomas Allen; Richard Van Allan; Carol Vaness; Keith Lewis; Maria Ewing; Elizabeth Gale; John Rawnsley; Dimitri Kavrakos | Bernard Haitink; London Philharmonic Orchestra; Glyndebourne Festival Chorus | EMI, Virgin Classics; Cat: 3 58638 2 |
| 1985 | Samuel Ramey; Ferruccio Furlanetto; Anna Tomowa-Sintow; Gösta Winbergh; Agnes Baltsa; Kathleen Battle; Alexander Malta; Paata Burchuladze | Herbert von Karajan, Berlin Philharmonic orchestra | CD: Deutsche Grammophon; Cat: DG DG 419 179–2 |
| 1985 | Alan Titus; Rolando Panerai; Júlia Várady; Thomas Moser; Arleen Auger; Edith Mathis; Rainer Scholze; Jan-Hendrik Rootering | Rafael Kubelík; Bavarian Radio Symphony Orchestra; Chorus of the Bavarian Radio | CD: RCA Classics (BMG); Cat: 74321 25284 2 |
| 1985 | Hermann Prey; Malcolm King; Cheryl Studer; Gösta Winbergh; Gundula Janowitz; Krisztina Laki; Marcel Vanaud; Sergei Koptchak | Jeffrey Tate; Orchestre National de France; Choeur de Radio France (recorded on 20 March 1985) | CD: Houseofopera-dot-com; Cat: |
| 1988 | Thomas Hampson; László Polgár; Edita Gruberová; Hans Peter Blochwitz; Roberta Alexander; Barbara Bonney; Anton Scharinger; Robert Holl | Nikolaus Harnoncourt; Royal Concertgebouw Orchestra; Dutch National Opera chorus | CD: Teldec Classics; Cat: 022924418426 |
| 1989 | Håkan Hagegård; Gilles Cachemaille; Arleen Auger; Nico van der Meel; Della Jones; Barbara Bonney; Bryn Terfel; Kristinn Sigmundsson | Arnold Östman; Drottningholm Palace Theatre orchestra and chorus | CD: L'oiseau-lyre; Cat: 425 943–2 |
| 1990 | William Shimell; Samuel Ramey; Cheryl Studer; Frank Lopardo; Carol Vaness; Susanne Mentzer; Natale de Carolis; Jan-Hendrik Rootering | Riccardo Muti; Vienna Philharmonic; Konzertvereinigung Wiener Staatsopernchor | CD: EMI; Cat: 7 54255 2 |
| 1990 | Thomas Allen; Simone Alaimo; Sharon Sweet; Francisco Araiza; Karita Mattila; Marie McLaughlin; Claudio Otelli; Robert Lloyd | Sir Neville Marriner; Academy of St Martin in the Fields; Ambrosian Opera Chorus | CD: Philips; Cat: 473 959–2 |
| 1990 | Renato Bruson; Nicola Ghiuzelev; Sona Ghazarian; Giuseppe Sabbatini; Gertrude Ottenthal; Patrizia Pace; Stefano Rinaldi-Milani; Franco de Grandis | Kölner Rundfunkchor; Kölner Rundfunk-Sinfonie-Orchester; Neeme Järvi | CD: Chandos |
| 1992 | Andreas Schmidt; Gregory Yurisich; Amanda Halgrimson; John Mark Ainsley; Lynne Dawson; Nancy Argenta; Gerald Finley; Alastair Miles | Roger Norrington; London Classical Players; Schütz Choir of London | CD: EMI Classics; Cat: 7 54859 2 |
| 1994 | Rodney Gilfry; Ildebrando D'Arcangelo; Ľuba Orgonášová; Christoph Prégardien; Charlotte Margiono; Eirian James; Julian Clarkson; Andrea Silvestrelli | John Eliot Gardiner; English Baroque Soloists; Monteverdi Choir | CD: DG Archiv; Cat: 445 870–2 |
| 1995 | Bo Skovhus; Alessandro Corbelli; Christine Brewer; Jerry Hadley; Felicity Lott; Nuccia Focile; Umberto Chiummo; Umberto Chiummo | Charles Mackerras; Scottish Chamber Orchestra & chorus | CD: Telarc; Cat: 80726 |
| 1997 | Bryn Terfel; Michele Pertusi; Renée Fleming; Herbert Lippert; Ann Murray; Monica Groop; Roberto Scaltriti; Mario Luperi | Sir Georg Solti; London Philharmonic orchestra, London Voices | CD: London; Cat: 455 500–2 |
| 1998 | Simon Keenlyside; Bryn Terfel; Carmela Remigio; Uwe Heilmann; Soile Isokoski; Patrizia Pace; Ildebrando D'Arcangelo; Matti Salminen | Claudio Abbado; Chamber Orchestra of Europe | CD: Deutsche Grammophon; Cat: |
| 1999 | Peter Mattei; Gilles Cachemaille; Carmela Remigio; Mark Padmore; Véronique Gens; Lisa Larsson; Till Fechner; Gudjon Oskarsson | Daniel Harding; Mahler Chamber Orchestra | CD: Virgin Classics; Cat: |
| 2000 | Garry Magee; Andrew Shore; Majella Cullagh; Barry Banks; Vivian Tierney; Mary Plazas; Dean Robinson; Clive Bayley | David Parry; Philharmonia orchestra Geoffrey Mitchell Choir | CD: Chandos Records; Cat: CHA 3057 (in English) |
| 2000 | Bo Skovhus; Renato Girolami; Adrianne Pieczonka; Torsten Kerl; Regina Schörg; Ildikó Raimondi; Boaz Daniel; Janusz Monarcha | Michael Halász; Nicolaus Estherházy Sinfonia; Hungarian Radio chorus | CD: Naxos Records; Cat: 8.660080-82 |
| 2006 | Johannes Weisser; Lorenzo Regazzo; Olga Pasichnyk; Kenneth Tarver; Alex Penda; Sunhae Im; Nikolay Borchev; Allessandro Guerzoni | René Jacobs; Freiburger Barockorchester; RIAS Kammerchor | CD: Harmonia Mundi; Cat: HMC901964.66 |
| 2012 | Ildebrando D'Arcangelo; Luca Pisaroni; Diana Damrau; Rolando Villazón; Joyce DiDonato; Mojca Erdmann; Konstantin Wolff; Vitalij Kowaljow | Yannick Nézet-Séguin; Mahler Chamber Orchestra | CD: Deutsche Grammophon; Cat: 0289 477 9878 1 |
| 2016 | Dimitris Tiliakos; Vito Priante; Myrtò Papatanasiu; Kenneth Tarver; Karina Gauvin; Christina Gansch; Guido Loconsolo; Mika Kares | Teodor Currentzis; MusicAeterna | CD: Sony Music Entertainment; Cat: 88985316032 |

== Video recordings ==
| Year | Cast (Don Giovanni, Leporello, Donna Anna, Don Ottavio, Donna Elvira, Zerlina, Masetto, Commendatore) | Conductor, Opera house and orchestra | Label |
|---|---|---|---|
| 1954 | Cesare Siepi; Otto Edelmann; Elisabeth Grümmer; Anton Dermota; Lisa Della Casa; Erna Berger; Walter Berry; Dezső Ernster | Wilhelm Furtwängler; Vienna Philharmonic, Salzburg Festival; Shot on 35mm film; directed by Paul Czinner using multi-cameras. | VHS: VAI; Cat: 69063; DVD: Deutsche Grammophon; Cat: 000440 073 0199 9 |
| 1961 | Dietrich Fischer-Dieskau; Walter Berry; Elisabeth Grümmer; Donald Grobe; Pilar Lorengar; Erika Köth; Ivan Sardi; Josef Greindl | Ferenc Fricsay; Deutsche Oper Berlin orchestra and chorus (videotaped performance for television; in black & white, sung in German) | DVD: Premiere Opera Ltd. Cat: 5245 |
| 1977 | Theo Adam; Siegfried Vogel; Anna Tomowa-Sintow; Peter Schreier; Kay Griffel; Renate Hoff; Peter Olesch; Motomu Itzuki | Otmar Suitner; Berlin State Opera orchestra and chorus (videotaped performance for Japanese television; sung in Italian with Japanese subtitles) | |
| 1979 | Ruggero Raimondi; José van Dam; Edda Moser; Kenneth Riegel; Kiri Te Kanawa; Teresa Berganza; Malcolm King; John Macurdy | Lorin Maazel; Paris Opera orchestra and chorus 1979 film directed by Joseph Losey | DVD: Second Sight; Cat: 2NDVD 3132; CD: Sony; Cat: 82876 87758–2; Blu-ray: Olive Films |
| 1987 | Thomas Allen; Claudio Desderi; Edita Gruberová; Francisco Araiza; Ann Murray; Susanne Mentzer; Natale de Carolis; Sergei Koptchak | Riccardo Muti; Teatro alla Scala orchestra and chorus videotaped performance; directed by Giorgio Strehler | DVD: Opus Arte; Cat: 3001 |
| 1987 | Samuel Ramey; Ferruccio Furlanetto; Anna Tomowa-Sintow; Gösta Winbergh; Júlia Várady; Kathleen Battle; Alexander Malta; Paata Burchuladze | Herbert von Karajan; Vienna Philharmonic; Videotaped performance at the Salzburg Festival; directed by Michael Hampe | DVD: Sony Classical; Cat: 88697296049; Blu-ray: C Major |
| 1988 | Thomas Allen; Stafford Dean; Makvala Kasrashvili; Stuart Burrows; Kiri Te Kanawa; Joan Rodgers; Gordon Sandison; Gwynne Howell | Colin Davis; Royal Opera House orchestra and chorus Television broadcast on Channel 4 produced by Peter Wood | VHS: Premiere Opera |
| 1990 | Eugene Perry; Herbert Perry; Dominique Labelle; Carroll Freeman; Lorraine Hunt Lieberson; Ai Lan Zhu; Elmore James; James Patterson | Craig Smith; Vienna Symphony orchestra Arnold Schoenberg Choir video directed by Peter Sellars cast and costumed in the manner of a modern blaxploitation movie, set in Spanish Harlem | DVD: Decca; Cat: 071 4119 9 DH |
| 1990 | Samuel Ramey; Ferruccio Furlanetto; Carol Vaness; Jerry Hadley; Karita Mattila; Dawn Upshaw; Philip Cokorinos; Kurt Moll | James Levine; Metropolitan Opera orchestra and chorus | DVD: The Opera Lovers; Cat: DVDDONG 199001 |
| 2000 | Bryn Terfel; Ferruccio Furlanetto; Renée Fleming; Paul Groves; Solveig Kringelborn; Hei-Kyung Hong; John Relyea; Sergei Koptchak | James Levine; Metropolitan Opera orchestra and chorus production directed by Franco Zeffirelli | DVD: Deutsche Grammophon; Cat: B003MSYXMS |
| 2001 | Rodney Gilfry; László Polgár; Isabel Rey; Roberto Sacca; Cecilia Bartoli; Liliana Nikiteanu; Oliver Widmer; Matti Salminen | Nikolaus Harnoncourt; Zürich Opera House orchestra and chorus video directed by Brian Large | DVD: Arthaus Musik; Cat: 100 328 |
| 2007 | Simon Keenlyside; Anton Scharinger; Eva Mei; Piotr Beczała; Malin Hartelius; Martina Janková; Reinhard Mayr; Alfred Muff | Franz Welser-Möst; Zürich Opera House orchestra and chorus production by Sven-Eric Bechtolf | DVD: EMI; Cat: 50999 500970 9 8 |
| 2008 | Simon Keenlyside; Kyle Ketelsen; Marina Poplavskaya; Ramón Vargas; Joyce DiDonato; Miah Persson; Robert Gleadow; Eric Halfvarson | Charles Mackerras; Royal Opera House orchestra and chorus stage director: Francesca Zambello | Blu-ray: Opus Arte; Cat: OABD7028D |
| 2010 | Bo Skovhus; Kyle Ketelsen; Marlis Petersen; Colin Balzer; Kristine Opolais; Kerstin Avemo; David Bižić; Anatoly Kocherga | Louis Langrée; Freiburg Baroque Orchestra; Recorded July 2010, Aix-en-Provence Festival; Stage director: Dmitri Tcherniakov | Blu-ray: Bel Air Classiques; Cat: BAC480 |
| 2010 | Gerald Finley; Luca Pisaroni; Anna Samuil; William Burden; Kate Royal; Anna Virovlansky; Guido Loconsolo; Brindley Sherratt | Vladimir Jurowski; Glyndebourne Festival Opera; Orchestra of the Age of Enlightenment stage direction by Jonathan Kent | DVD: EMI; Cat: 072017–9 |
| 2011 | Peter Mattei; Bryn Terfel; Anna Netrebko; Giuseppe Filianoti; Barbara Frittoli; Anna Prohaska; Stefan Kocan; Kwangchul Youn | Daniel Barenboim; Teatro alla Scala orchestra and chorus | DVD: Deutsche Grammophon; Cat: |
| 2015 | Carlos Álvarez; Alex Esposito; Irina Lungu; Saimir Pirgu; Maria José Siri; Natalia Roman; Christian Senn; Rafał Siwek | Stefano Montanari; Arena di Verona orchestra and chorus | DVD: Major; Cat: |
