= Luise Helletsgruber =

Austrian operatic soprano

Luise Helletsgruber (30 May 1901 – 5 January 1967) was an Austrian operatic soprano, who performed at the Vienna State Opera, the Salzburg Festival and the Glyndebourne Festival Opera.

== Life and career ==
Born in Wienerherberg, Helletsgruber studied in Vienna and made her debut in 1922 at the Vienna State Opera as the young shepherd in Wagner's Tannhäuser. The singer remained a member of the ensemble of the Haus am Ring until 1942. She quickly developed a broad repertoire, especially as a lyric soprano, with a focus on Mozart roles. She had a lovable and charming stage presence as well as a slender but powerful voice and impressed audiences in Vienna, Salzburg and Glyndebourne as Cherubino in The Marriage of Figaro, as Donna Anna and Donna Elvira in Don Giovanni and as Dorabella in Così fan tutte. Her lyrical roles also included Eva in Wagner's Die Meistersinger von Nürnberg, Micaëla in Bizet's Carmen and Marguerite in Gounod's Faust. Occasionally she also took on more dramatic roles, such as Elsa in Wagner's Lohengrin or Liù in Puccini's Turandot, the latter with Jan Kiepura as Kalaf.

Together with Erika Rokyta and Jella Braun-Fernwald, she went on tour in the mid-1920s. Until 1938 she regularly sang leading roles at the Salzburg Festival, for example in 1931 and 1935 to 1938, Donna Elvira in Don Giovanni and Marzelline in Beethoven's Fidelio. She also assumed the latter role in 1936 on the occasion of the reopening of the rebuilt Salzburger Festspielhaus. The conductor was Arturo Toscanini, and the director Lothar Wallerstein in stage designs by Clemens Holzmeister. The ensemble included Lotte Lehmann as Leonore, Koloman von Pataky as Florestan, Carl Bissuti, Alfred Jerger, Anton Baumann and Hermann Gallos.

Her major contribution to music history was her participation in the first five seasons of the Glyndebourne Festival Opera in southern England, which was founded in 1934 by John Christie and his wife, the singer Audrey Mildmay, the conductor Fritz Busch and the director Carl Ebert. There she was a member of a renowned international ensemble and played leading roles in four Mozart operas. Three of them, the three Da Ponte's operas, were recorded and have been available ever since. They were praised by critics as outstanding and excellent. In 1934 Helletsgruber made her debut in Glyndebourne as Dorabella and Cherubino, in 1935 she also sang the First Lady in The Magic Flute. In 1936 she sang Donna Elvira for the first time and continued to sing Cherubino and the First Lady. Even after the Annexation of Austria in March 1938 she continued to participate in the English festival.

Another important sound document by Helletsgruber is Beethoven's Symphony No. 9, a recording with the Vienna Philharmonic under Felix von Weingartner, recorded in two parts in 1935 and 1938.

Helletsgruber and her husband Karl Friedrich Alois Lehr (1896-1967) died of the consequences of a car accident in Sattledt.

== Recordings ==
- Beethoven's Fidelio, with Lotte Lehmann (Leonore), Koloman von Pataky, Carl Bissuti, Alfred Jerger, Anton Baumann, Luise Helletsgruber, Hermann Gallos, William Wernigk and Karl Ettl. Vienna Philharmonic, Salzburger Festspielchor, conductor Arturo Toscanini, 1936. (act one only) Radio Years, Grammophon
- Beethoven's 9th symphony, with Luise Helletsgruber (soprano), Rosette Anday (mezzo-soprano), Georg Maikl (tenor) and Richard Mayr (bass). Wiener Philharmoniker, Konzertvereinigung Wiener Staatsopernchor, conductor Felix von Weingartner, 1935 and 1938. Zuletzt auf Naxos Records 8.110863.
- Mozart's Così fan tutte, with Ina Souez (Fiordiligi), Luise Helletsgruber (Dorabella), Irene Eisinger (Despina), Heddle Nash (Ferrando), Willi Domgraf-Fassbaender (Guglielmo), John Brownlee (Alfonso). Glyndebourne Festival Orchestra, conductor Fritz Busch. First complete studio recording of this opera, 1936. His Master's Voice, later also Naxos Records 8.110280-81. (Remastered Version, 2004)
- Mozart's Don Giovanni, with John Brownlee (Don Giovanni), Salvatore Baccaloni (Leporello), Ina Souez (Donna Anna), Koloman von Pataky (Don Ottavio), Luise Helletsgruber (Donna Elvira), Audrey Mildmay (Zerlina), Roy Henderson (Masetto), David Franklin (Commendatore). Glyndebourne Festival Orchestra, conductor Fritz Busch. First complete studio recording of this opera, 1936. His Master's Voice, Turnabout TV-4117-4119, reissued in 1989, Pearl GEMM CDS-9369 and Naxos Records 8.110135-37.
- Mozart's Don Giovanni, with Ezio Pinza (Don Giovanni), Virgilio Lazzari (Leporello), Elisabeth Rethberg (Donna Anna), Dino Borgioli (Don Ottavio), Luise Helletsgruber (Donna Elvira), Margit Bokor (Zerlina), Karl Ettl (Masetto), Herbert Alsen (Commendatore). Wiener Philharmoniker, conductor Bruno Walter. Live-Mitschnitt, 1937. Andromeda ANDRCD 5126.
- Mozart's The Marriage of Figaro, with Audrey Mildmay (Susanna), Aulikki Rautawaara (Contessa Almaviva), Luise Helletsgruber (Cherubino), Constance Willis (Marcellina), (unknown) Barbarina, Willi Domgraf-Fassbaender (Figaro), Roy Henderson (Count Almaviva), Norman Allin (Bartolo), Heddle Nash (Don Basilio). Glyndebourne Festival Orchestra, conductor Fritz Busch. 1934–35. Turnabout TV-4114-4116, reissued in 1981, Turnabout Historical Series THS 65081–83, in 1989, Pearl GEMM CDS-9375, and Naxos Records (2002) 8.110186-87.
- Wagner's Götterdämmerung, Live recording from the Vienna State Opera (Excerpts from Act 3), with Max Lorenz (Siegfried), Anny Konetzni (Brünnhilde), Luise Helletsgruber (Woglinde), Dora With (Floßhilde) and Aenne Michalsky (Wellgunde). Wiener Philharmoniker, Konzertvereinigung Wiener Staatsopernchor, conductor Hans Knappertsbusch.
