= Noël Eadie =

- Born: December 10, 1901; Paisley, Renfrewshire, Scotland
- Died: April 11, 1950 (aged 48)
- Education: St Leonards School
- Occupation: Operatic soprano
- Years active: 1921–1947
- Known for: Queen of the Night in The Magic Flute
- Spouse: R. J. Dixon Wilkie

Noël Eadie (December 10, 1901 – April 11, 1950) was a Scottish soprano. She began her career on the concert stage in 1921 and made her opera debut in 1923 with the British National Opera Company as the Queen of Night in Mozart's The Magic Flute. She achieved fame for her portrayal of this role both in the United Kingdom and in the United States. She remained active as a concert and opera singer until illness forced her into retirement in 1947.

== Early life and career ==
Noël Eadie was born in Paisley, Renfrewshire on December 10, 1901. Her father was a provost in service to Paisley. She was educated at St Leonards School in St Andrews, Fife. She studied singing in London; with her principal voice teacher being Australian soprano Esta d'Argo. D'Argo's encouragement was instrumental in her decision to pursue a performance career.

In August 1921 Eadie sang at a benefit concert given at the Broadstairs Cineama for the Broadstairs War Memorial Fund in which she was accompanied by pianist Margaret Cooper. The following month she appeared at the La Scala Theatre, Dublin with the Dublin Symphony Orchestra conducted by Vincent O'Brien as a soloist at the "Mater Orchestral Concert". In October 1921 she was a soloist in a series of concerts with the Winter Garden Orchestra at Llandudno Pier Pavilion Theatre (LPPT). In reviewing her performances at the LPPT, The North Wales Weekly News stated she "possessed a beautiful voice and perfect method".

In 1922 Eadie was a soloist in a concert at Ulster Hall in Belfast, and made her London recital debut at Wigmore Hall with Harold Craxton as her accompanist. In the latter concert she performed arias by Handel and Mozart among other repertoire. In 1923 she was the soprano soloist in both the Brahms Requiem and Mendelssohn's Elijah with the Carlisle Choral Society at Strand Road drill hall, Carlisle, performed as a guest singer with the Belfast Philharmonic Society led by conductor Edward Godfrey Brown, and was a soloist in Handel's Messiah with the Bolton Choral Union. I

In April 1923 Eadie gave a recital at the Grand Pump Room in Bath, and was a soloist with the Worcester Festival Choral Society and conductor Ivor Atkins. In October 1923 she sang a concert with Norman Allin at St Andrew's Hall, Norwich. She was also a soloist in Elijah with conductor Henry Lucas Balfour and the Royal Choral Society at Royal Albert Hall in November 1923. She ended the year as a soloist in Bach's Christmas Oratorio sung in Pontypridd with the Tabernacle Choral Society.

== Queen of the Night ==
Eadie began her opera career with the British National Opera Company (BNOC) in Edinburgh; portraying the Queen of Night (QON) opposite Miriam Licette as Pamina in Mozart's The Magic Flute on December 1, 1923 at the King's Theatre, Glasgow under the baton of Hamilton Harty. Her opera debut was made under less than ideal circumstances; being asked to learn the role just two days before her debut and without any rehearsal. She toured with the BNOC to the Royal Opera House (ROH) in London in 1924 where she repeated the QON under conductor Julius Harrison. (Note: Some sources such as Grove Music Online state that Eadie gave her first opera performances at the Royal Opera House in London as Woglinde in Der Ring des Nibelungen in 1926, and that she gave her first performance with British National Opera Company as the Queen of Night in Edinburgh in 1928. This however, is contradicted by 1924 newspaper reviews of her performance as The Queen of the Night at the Royal Opera House in London with the British National Opera Company that were published in January 1924.) Mozart's queen was the opera role for which she became famous. In his review of her first London performance as the Queen, critic Ernest Newman wrote:

"Of the other operatic performances of the week the best, in general, was The Magic Flute which introduced us to a new and very promising Queen of the Night, Miss Noel Eadie. She sang the difficult music with a good deal of ease and a decided purity of tone, though she did not quite realise all the dramatic possibilities of the part. The Queen of the Night is a character, not merely a medium for a display of coloratura."

Eadie repeated the QON with the BNOC on tour to Manchester and Liverpool in 1924. She sang the role again in Edinburgh in 1924, 1925, 1927, and 1928. She sang the QON with BNOC at His Majesty's Theatre, London in 1926 with Eugene Goossens conducting. When she repeated the role at the ROH in 1931 under conductor Bruno Walter it was recorded live for international radio broadcast. The Chicago Tribune among other American papers reported that it was "the first operatic broadcast from Europe to America" when it was relayed by WABC and CBS Radio. She made made her American debut as the QON at the Civic Opera House with the Chicago Civic Opera on November 3, 1931. Edward Moore of the Chicago Tribune wrote:

"Miss Eadie is an astonishing person. Perhaps one reason why The Magic Flute is not more often considered by opera producers is that the Queen of the Night is such a difficult part. Miss Eadie started her singing with almost the breadth of a mezzo-soprano. Soon her voice began to soar higher and higher , lightening as it went, and as it lightened growing more lovely. There are high F's to sing here— ask any singer how high they are — and it was a revelation to hear how surely and firmly she hit them, not to speak of the C's and D's and other notes that make up this remarkable set of vocal fireworks. Not for a long time has there been such coloratura singing here abouts."

In 1933 Eadie performed as the QOH with the Sadler's Wells Opera in a production co-starring Joan Cross as Pamina and Tudor Davies as Tamino. She also performed the QON at the Glyndebourne Festival Opera in 1935 and 1936. In the 1936 cast Aulikki Rautawaara was her Pamina, Carl Ebert was The Speaker, and Alexander Kipnis was Sarastro. It was recorded for radio broadcast.

== Other opera and concert work ==
Eadie returned frequently to Edinburgh in a variety of opera roles; including Gilda in Verdi's Rigoletto (1926), Mimì in Puccini's La bohème (1927 & 1929), Rosina in The Barber of Seville (1927, 1928, & 1929), Cio-Cio-San in Puccini's Madama Butterfly (1928, 1938, & 1944), Marguerite in Gounod's Faust (1929), and Liù in Turandot (1929 & 1930). She performed in Der Ring des Nibelungen under conductors Bruno Walter and Robert Heger at the ROH; appearing as Helmwige in Die Walküre (1926), Woglinde in Das Rheingold (1926), and as both Woglinde and the 2nd Norn in Götterdämmerung (1927).

In 1930 she sang Sandrina in the British première of Mozart's La finta giardiniera at the Scala Theatre in London. In Chicago she sang Gilda to the Rigoletto of John Charles Thomas and Duke of Mantua of Jan Kiepura in 1931. She also sang Gilda at the ROH that same year.

In 1935–1936 she performed Konstanze in Die Entführung aus dem Serail at the Glyndebourne Festival Opera. In 1936–1937 she sang both Rosina in The Barber of Seville and Olympia in The Tales of Hoffmann at the ROH. In 1938 she returned to the ROH as a last minute replacement for an ailing Maggie Teyte in the role of Cio-Cio-San in Puccini's Madama Butterfly.

During World War II she sang at many charity events and at concerts for those serving in the armed forces. In 1941 she was a soloist in Edward Elgar's The Kingdom with the BBC Symphony Orchestra & Chorus at Colston Hall. In 1946 she was the soprano soloist in Handel's Messiah at both the Lichfield Cathedral and the Hippodrome Theatre, Coventry. Her final performances were in 1947. That year she was a soloist with the London Symphony Orchestra led by George Frederick Brockless at Central Hall Westminster as a soloist in Samuel Coleridge-Taylor's The Song of Hiawatha.

== Personal life and death ==
Eadie was married to R. J. Dixon Wilkie. Illness forced Eadie into retirement in 1947, and she was in poor health until her death two and half years later.

== Critical assessment ==
Grove Music Online states, "There was some reserve in the expression of Eadie’s singing, but her well-poised voice was an admirable musical instrument, equable and pure. No other Queen of Night of her generation caused the listener so few qualms; and though there may have been heroines more resourceful scenically in Entführung, her Konstanze was surpassingly musical."

== Notes and References ==
=== Bibliography ===
- Simeone, Nigel (2025). Edward Elgar and Adrian Boult. Boydell Press. ISBN 9781837652204.
- Wearing, J. P. (2014). The London Stage 1920-1929: A Calendar of Productions, Performers, and Personnel. Rowman & Littlefield. ISBN 9780810893016.
