= Aenne Michalsky =

Austrian opera singer

Aenne Michalsky (19 July 1908 in Prague – 7 November 1986 in Vienna) – who was also given 1901 as year of birth – was an Austrian operatic soprano, who was engaged at the Vienna State Opera from 1924 to 1955 and who sang at the Salzburg Festival from 1928 to 1941.

== Life and career ==
Little is known about Michalsky's life. However, the performance catalogue of the Vienna State Opera provides a good insight into the singer's three decades of activity at the house. Michalsky took on many small roles, servants and maidservants, page, squire, and slave, angel's voice, but also sang occasionally leading roles such as Liù in Turandot or Micaëla in Carmen. 98 times she impersonated the Countess Ceprano in G. Verdi's Rigoletto, 113 times the maid Marianne Leitmetzerin in Der Rosenkavalier by Hugo von Hofmannsthal and Richard Strauss, who became her signature role.

At the Salzburg Festival she made her debut as Second Lady in The Magic Flute from 1927 to 1930/1928 and in 1933 as Second Servant in the Die Frau ohne Schatten, but also sang the maid Marianne Leitmetzerin in the Rosenkavalier every year from 1932 to 1939 and again from 1938 to 1944/1941. She could also be seen and heard in Salzburg as Zerlina in Don Giovanni and as Barbarina in The Marriage of Figaro, and in smaller roles in operas by Gluck, Strauss and Weber.

She sang under the direction of a number of renowned conductors, including Wilhelm Furtwängler, Robert Heger, Hans Knappertsbusch, Clemens Krauss, Dimitri Mitropoulos and Bruno Walter.

Michalsky was also a concert singer. For example, in 1931 she took over soprano roles in a Radio Verkehrs AG-concert with works by Brahms, Bruckner and Wolf, conducted by Rudolf Nilius, and in G. Mahler's Symphony No. 2 in Wiener Konzerthaus, conducted by Anton Konrath. In 1946 she sang in the Mozart Hall A.Bergs's Seven Early Songs.

== Roles ==
G. Bizet:

- Frasquita und Micaëla in Carmen

Alexandre Borodin:

- Amme der Fürstin Jaroslawna in Prince Igor

E. d’Albert:

- Pepa, Nuri und Antonia in Tiefland

Christoph Willibald Gluck:

- Amor und Geister des Elysiums in Orfeo ed Euridice

Engelbert Humperdinck:

- Sandmännchen, Taumännchen and Gretel in Hänsel und Gretel

Erich Wolfgang Korngold:

- Lucienne in Die tote Stadt

Franz Lehár:

- Sylviane in Die lustige Witwe
- Anita in Giuditta

Leoncavallo:

- Nedda in Der Bajazzo

A. Lortzing:

- Marie in Zar und Zimmermann
- Nanette in Der Wildschütz

P. Mascagni:

- Lola in Cavalleria rusticana

Mozart:

- Barbarina in Le nozze di Figaro
- Zerlina in Don Giovanni
- 2. Dame in Die Zauberflöte

Nicolai:

- Jungfer Anna Reich in The Merry Wives of Windsor

G. Puccini:

- Kate Pinkerton in Madama Butterfly
- Nella in Gianni Schicchi
- Liù in Turandot

G. Rossini:

- Clorinda in La Cenerentola

Bedřich Smetana:

- Marie in Die verkaufte Braut

Johann Strauß:

- Ida und Felicita in Die Fledermaus

R. Strauss:

- Ein Sklave in Salome
- Vierte Magd und Vertraute in Elektra
- Marianne Leitmetzerin in Der Rosenkavalier
- Echo und Dryade in Ariadne auf Naxos
- 1. Elf in Die ägyptische Helena
- 2. Dienerin, Ungeborene und Sklavin in Die Frau ohne Schatten

Suppé:

- Isabella und Fiametta in Boccaccio

G. Verdi:

- Gräfin Ceprano und Page der Herzogin in Rigoletto
- Nannetta in Falstaff

R. Wagner:

- Friedensbote in Rienzi
- Wellgunde in Götterdämmerung
- Knappe und Blumenmädchen in Parsifal

Carl Maria von Weber:

- Droll in Oberon

Wolf-Ferrari:

- Lucieta in I quatro rusteghi

== Recordings ==
- R.Strauss: Der Rosenkavalier Extracts (end of the 1st act and beginning of the 2nd act), with Lotte Lehmann, Elisabeth Schumann, Maria Olczewska, Richard Mayr, Hermann Gallos, Viktor Madin, Bella Paalen, Karl Ettl and Aenne Michalsky. Wiener Philharmoniker, Konzertvereinigung Wiener Staatsopernchor, conductor: Robert Heger (3xLP, Mono + Box)
- R. Wagner: Götterdämmerung, Live-Mitschnitt aus der Wiener Staatsoper (Excerpts from the 3rd act), with Max Lorenz (Siegfried), Anny Konetzni (Brünnhilde), Luise Helletsgruber (Woglinde), Dora With (Floßhilde) and Aenne Michalsky (Wellgunde). Wiener Philharmoniker, Konzertvereinigung Wiener Staatsopernchor, conductor:Hans Knappertsbusch.
- Great Singers and Musicians in Copenhagen, 1931–1939.
