= Paalen =

Paalen is a surname. Notable people with the surname include:

- Bella Paalen (1881–1964), Austrian opera singer
- Wolfgang Paalen (1905–1959), Austrian-Mexican artist
