= Bella Paalen =

Austrian opera singer (1881–1964)

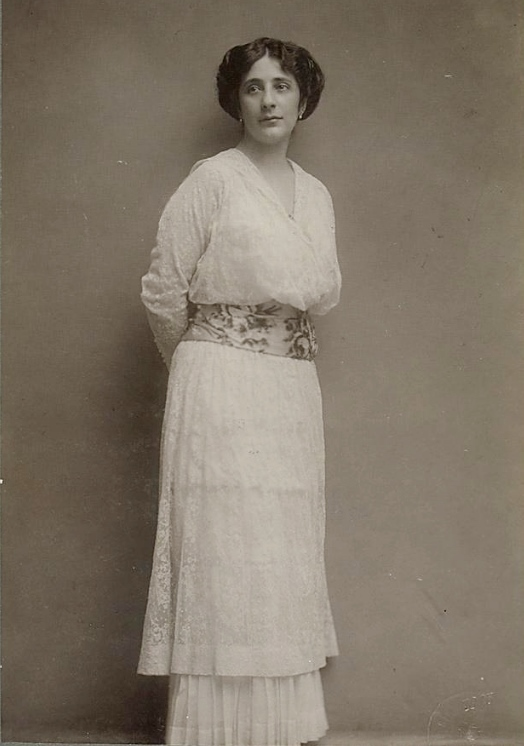
Bella Paalen, c. 1915

Bella Paalen, real name Isabella Pollak (9 July or 9 December 1881 – 28 July 1964) was an Austrian-American operatic contralto of Hungarian origin. She was engaged for 31 years at the k.-k. Hofoper in Vienna, later the State Opera, was appointed Kammersängerin there in 1933 and had to leave the country after the Anschluss because of her Jewish origins.

== Life and career ==
Born in Pásztó, Austria-Hungary, Paalen was the daughter of Ernst Pollak (1851–1935) and Laura Pollak née Jamnitz (1858–1935). The father came from Jungbunzlau, the mother from Vienna where her two brothers B. F. Dolbin (1883–1971) and Otto Friedrich Pollak (1885–1915) were born. Paalen's second brother and her parents also died in Vienna. In 1912, her brother Benno Fred changed his family name to Dolbin.

She studied singing with Rosa Papier and Johannes Ress. In 1904, she made her debut at the Düsseldorfer Opernhaus – as Fidès in Meyerbeer's Le prophète. In 1905 and 1906, she was at the Stadttheater Graz. The Viennese court opera director and composer Gustav Mahler heard her in Graz as soloist in his Symphony No. 3, was impressed and engaged her to his house.

=== K.k. Hofoper in Vienna ===
From 1 September 1907 to 1 September 1937, Paalen was a member of the ensemble of the Imperial Court Opera and from 1918 of the Vienna State Opera. She sang leading roles there, but also medium, small and minor parts. She took part in two Viennese premieres, in 1907 as Kate Pinkerton in Puccini's Madama Butterfly and in 1911 as Annina in Der Rosenkavalier by Hugo von Hofmannsthal and Richard Strauss. This role became her parade role in Vienna, she sang Annina in a total of 173 state opera performances.

She appeared on stage at the Vienna State Opera 58 times as Amneris in Verdi's Aida, 54 times as Rosalia in d'Albert's Tiefland, 46 times as Herodias, 39 times as Ortrud, 32 times as Clytemnestra and 31 times as Ulrica. She was part of the cast of the Vienna Un ballo in maschera in 1924, still considered legendary today, with Richard Tauber as Gustaf III, Mattia Battistini as René Ankarström and the ladies Vera Schwarz (Amelia), Bella Paalen (Ulrica) and Selma Kurz (Oscar). In the 31 seasons in which the artist was engaged at the Vienna Opera, she demonstrated her versatility. She was equally at home in the heavy Wagnerian repertoire as in German Spieloper and Viennese operettas, she sang the Italian and French repertoire with aplomb, as well as works from the Slavic repertoire. And she proved herself as a stand-in for smaller and larger roles. She took on the title role in Carmen, in which she had otherwise always impersonated Mercedes, and Mamma Lucia in Cavalleria rusticana, twice as Wigelis in Feuersnot, once as Gertrud in Hans Heiling and, surprisingly, on 17 January 1913, as the Steersman in Hans Heiling. Jänner 1913 the Steuermann in Der fliegende Holländer, a tenor role.

Paalen was highly associated with the State Opera and was awarded the title Kammersängerin for her achievements in 1933.

=== Guest performances ===
Paalen made guest appearances – parallel to her engagement at the Vienna Opera – in Holland, Spain, England and Czechoslovakia. In 1911 and 1912, she sang Fricka in Die Walküre at the Amsterdam Wagner Society. In 1925, she made a successful guest appearance at the Royal Opera House in London in four Wagner roles (as Ortrud, Magdalene, Mary and Fricka) as well as Annina in Der Rosenkavalier. From 1934 to 1937, she sang two minor roles at the Salzburg Festival, in Der Corregidor by Hugo Wolf and in Elektra by Richard Strauss. According to Kutsch/Riemens, these guest performances brought her "great success".

=== Emigration and life in the United States ===
As it was no longer safe for Paalen to stay in Vienna due to her Jewish origins, she emigrated to the United States in 1939 with the help of Lotte Lehmann. Her brother B. F. Dolbin, a press illustrator, had also fled Germany for the US. "The late timing of her escape from Nazi Vienna indicates that she had probably felt protected by her 30-plus years of membership in the Vienna State Opera." Like her brother, the singer settled in New York City, but was unable to find an engagement. From then on she worked as a singing teacher until 1959. She became a US citizen in 1944 and died in New York in 1964, aged 83.

== Roles ==
=== Premiere ===
- 1934: Marietta in Bittners Das Veilchen – Wiener Staatsoper, conductor: Clemens Krauss (8 December)

=== Repertoire ===
Bizet:

- Mercedes and Titelpartie in Carmen

d'Albert:

- Rosalia in Tiefland

Delibes:

- Mistress Bentson in Lakmé

Giordano:

- Bersi in Andrea Chénier

Humperdinck:

- Hänsel und Gertrud in Hänsel und Gretel

Kienzl:

- Magdalena in Der Evangelimann

Lortzing:

- Witwe Browe in Zar und Zimmermann
- Irmentraut in Der Waffenschmied
- Nanette and Countess in Der Wildschütz

Mascagni:

- Mamma Lucia in Cavalleria rusticana

Meyerbeer:

- Erste Ehrendame in Les Huguenots
- Fidès in Le prophète
- Selika in L'Africaine

Millöcker:

- Palmatica in Der Bettelstudent

Mozart:

- Dritte Dame in the magic flute

Puccini

- Kate Pinkerton in Madama Butterfly
- Äbtissin in Suor Angelica
- Zita in Gianni Schicchi

Smetana:

- Háta and Ludmila in The Bartered Bride

Johann Strauß:

- Prinz Orlofsky in Die Fledermaus

Richard Strauss:

- Herodias in Salome
- Klytämnestra, Magd, Vertraute und Aufseherin in Elektra
- Annina in Der Rosenkavalier
- Dryade in Ariadne auf Naxos

Tschaikowski:

- Larina und Filipjewna in Eugene Onegin
- Gouvernante in The Queen of Spades

Verdi:

- Ulrica in Un ballo in maschera
- Giovanna und Maddalena in Rigoletto
- Azucena in Il trovatore
- Preziosilla in La forza del destino
- Amneris in Aida
- Meg Page and Mrs. Quickly in Falstaff

Wagner:

- Adriano in Rienzi
- Mary in Der fliegende Holländer
- Venus in Tannhäuser
- Ortrud in Lohengrin
- Brangäne in Tristan und Isolde
- Magdalene in Die Meistersinger von Nürnberg
- Fricka, Erda and a Rhine daughter in Das Rheingold
- Fricka and Grimgerde in Die Walküre
- Erda in Siegfried
- Norn in Götterdämmerung
- Blumenmädchen, Knappe and voice from above in Parsifal

Wolf

- Donna Mercedes and Manuela in Der Corregidor

Wolf-Ferrari:

- Margarita in I quatro rusteghi

== Recordings ==
- Acoustic recordings at Pathé, 1910
- Strauss: Der Rosenkavalier Excerpts (end of Act 1 and beginning of Act 2), with Lotte Lehmann, Elisabeth Schumann, Maria Olczewska, Richard Mayr, Hermann Gallos, Viktor Madin, Bella Paalen, Karl Ettl and Aenne Michalsky. Wiener Philharmoniker, Konzertvereinigung Wiener Staatsopernchor, conductor: Robert Heger, Vienna 1934, His Master's Voice (3xLP, Mono + Box)
- The Koch/Schwann edition published excerpts from performances at the Vienna State Opera, in which she, among other things, performed Magdalene, Herodias, Mary, Annina, Fricka, Grimgerde and sings a Norn.
- On EJS, parts from Götterdämmerung, Staatsoper Vienna, 1935

== Publication ==
- Worte des Gedenkens. In Aufbau (New York), vol. 13, 21. February 1947, No. 8.7.
