= Margaret Cooper =

Margaret Cooper may refer to:

- Margaret Joyce Cooper (1909–2002), English swimmer
- Margaret Cooper (singer) (1877–1922), English singer
- Margaret Cooper (nurse) (1922–2013), English nurse and nurse-tutor
- Margaret Cooper (WRNS officer) (1918–2016), worked at the signal interception and deciphering centre at Bletchley Park, England
- Margaret Miller Cooper (1872–1965), American artist
