= Sarah-Jane Lewis =

British soprano opera singer (born 1987)

- Born: 1987 (age 37–38)
- Occupation: Classic soprano
- Musical career
- Genres: Classical opera
- Instrument: Vocal

Sarah-Jane Lewis (born 1987) is a British soprano opera singer. Lewis graduated from the Royal College of Music in 2009 and received her diploma from the Royal Academy of Music in 2013. She then finished her education at the National Opera Studio in 2014.

Lewis has won multiply awards including the Hampshire National Singing Competition in 2013, earning a prize of UK£6,000. In 2014, she won second place behind Christina Gansch at the Kathleen Ferrier Awards. The Times described Lewis as "a warm, capacious soprano, its strength powerfully contained and focused throughout its wide register. And her wonderfully serene and assured stage presence reaches out to her audience,"

As of 2015, Lewis is currently a guest artist for the Henley Symphony Orchestra.
