= The Marriage of Figaro (1949 film) =

1949 film

- Directed by: Georg Wildhagen
- Written by: Pierre Beaumarchais (play); Lorenzo Da Ponte (original libretto); Georg Wildhagen
- Produced by: Walter Lehmann
- Starring: Angelika Hauff; Willi Domgraf-Fassbaender; Sabine Peters; Elsa Wagner
- Cinematography: Eugen Klagemann; Karl Plintzner
- Edited by: Hildegard Tegener
- Music by: Wolfgang Amadeus Mozart
- Production company: DEFA
- Distributed by: Progress Film
- Release date: 25 November 1949
- Running time: 107 minutes
- Country: East Germany
- Language: German

The Marriage of Figaro (German: Figaros Hochzeit) is a 1949 East German musical film directed by Georg Wildhagen and starring Angelika Hauff, Willi Domgraf-Fassbaender and Sabine Peters. It was based on the opera The Marriage of Figaro by Wolfgang Amadeus Mozart and Lorenzo Da Ponte, which was itself based on the play The Marriage of Figaro by Pierre Beaumarchais. The film was made by DEFA, the state production company of East Germany, in their Babelsberg Studio and the nearby Babelsberg Park. It sold 5,479,427 tickets.

The production used a German text instead of the Italian original. The recitatives were replaced with dialogue spoken by the actors. Except for Willi Domgraf-Fassbaender as Figaro and Mathieu Ahlersmeyer as Count Almaviva, the singing parts were supplied by opera singers. During Figaro's aria "Non più andrai" (In German: "Nun vergiss leises Flehn"), a battle scene from Veit Harlan's 1942 film The Great King is shown.

== Cast ==
- Angelika Hauff as Susanna, sung by Erna Berger
- Willi Domgraf-Fassbaender as Figaro
- Sabine Peters as Countess Rosina, sung by Tiana Lemnitz
- Mathieu Ahlersmeyer as Count Almaviva
- Elsa Wagner as Marcellina, sung by Margarete Klose
- Victor Janson as Dr. Bartolo, sung by Eugen Fuchs
- Alfred Balthoff as Basilio, sung by Paul Schmidtmann
- Franz Weber as Don Curzio, sung by Kurt Reimann
- Ernst Legal as Antonio, sung by Willi Sahler
- Willi Puhlmann as Cherubino, sung by Anneliese Müller
- Katharina Mayberg as Barbarina, sung by Elfriede Hingst
- Theodor Vogeler as Scribe (not a role in the opera)

== Bibliography ==
- Davidson, John E. & Hake, Sabine. Framing the Fifties: Cinema in a Divided Germany. Berghahn Books, 2007.
