= Anneliese Müller =

German opera singer

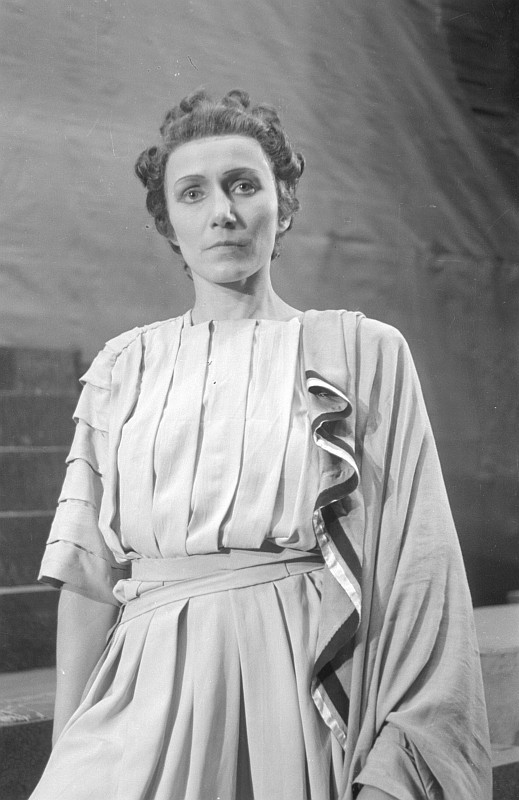
Anneliese Müller, Orpheus und Eurydike

Anneliese Müller (8 August 1911 – 5 April 2011) was a German operatic alto and mezzo-soprano.

== Life ==
Müller began her artistic career in the choir of the Stadttheater Halberstadt. There she got a contract as a soloist in 1939. In 1945 she changed to the Staatsoper Berlin. At the reopening of the house after the Second World War she sang the title role in Gluck's Orfeo ed Euridice. Later she was appointed Kammersängerin. She left the stage in 1966.

== Filmography ==
- 1949: The Marriage of Figaro (vocal synchronization)

== Operas ==
- 1954: Richard Wagner: Die Meistersinger von Nürnberg (Magdalena) – director: Wolf Völker (Deutsche Staatsoper Berlin)
- 1955: Alban Berg: Wozzeck –director: Werner Kelch (Deutsche Staatsoper Berlin)
- 1956: Richard Wagner: Die Walküre – director: Erich Witte (Deutsche Staatsoper Berlin)
- 1957: Richard Wagner: Das Rheingold (Rheintochter) – director: Erich Witte (Deutsche Staatsoper Berlin)
- 1958: Sergei Prokofiev: Die Verlobung im Kloster (Duenna) – director: Erich-Alexander Winds (Deutsche Staatsoper Berlin)
- 1958: Giacomo Puccini: Madama Butterfly (Suzuki) – director: Peter Neitsch (Deutsche Staatsoper Berlin)
- 1961: Kurt Schwaen: Leonce und Lena (Gouvernante) – director: Erich-Alexander Winds (Deutsche Staatsoper Berlin – Apollosaal)
