= Mathieu Ahlersmeyer =

German opera singer

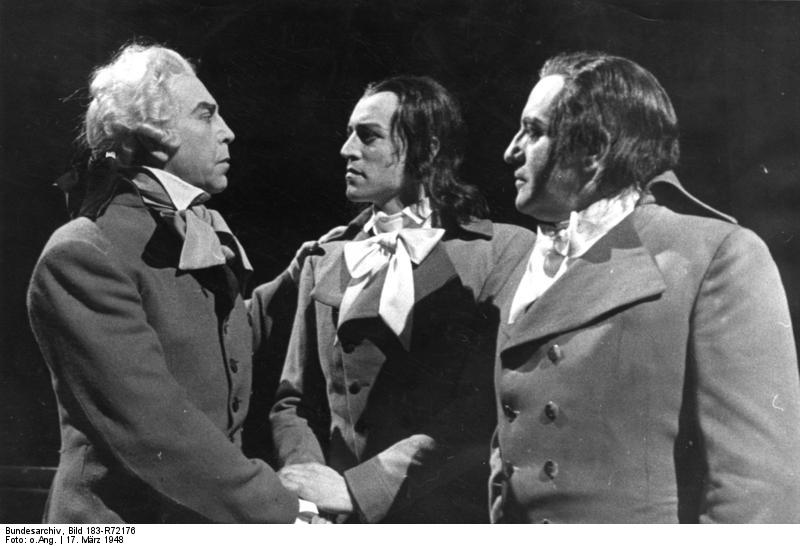
- Ahlersmeyer (l.) in the title role of Dantons Tod at the Hamburgische Staatsoper (1948)
- Born: 29 June 1896; Cologne
- Died: 3 March 1964 (aged 67); Garmisch-Partenkirchen, Bavaria, Germany
- Occupation: Operatic baritone
- Organizations: Staatsoper Dresden; Hamburgische Staatsoper

Mathieu Karl Maria Ahlersmeyer (29 June 1896 – 23 July 1979) was a German operatic baritone and actor.

== Life ==
Born in Cologne, Ahlersmeyer took singing and acting lessons with Karl Niemann in Cologne. He gained his first stage experience in Mönchengladbach in 1929; engagements followed as an opera singer in Berlin, Hamburg (1931–34), Dresden and also abroad. In 1938 he sang the title role in the world premiere of Werner Egk's opera Peer Gynt. In the final phase of the Second World War Hitler included him in the Gottbegnadeten list of the most important artists in 1944.

Ahlersmeyer's residence in Dresden was bombed in 1945, and he went to the Hamburgische Staatsoper, where he was engaged again. His last guest appearance in Hamburg was in 1973. Ahlersmeyer died in Garmisch-Partenkirchen at the age of 83. He is buried at the Partenkirchen cemetery.

He was married to Marcia Otten. The marriage yielded four children.

== Filmography ==
- 1949: The Marriage of Figaro, Part of the Count Almaviva in this DEFA-film adaptation of the opera
- 1951: The Dubarry
- 1955: Das Fräulein von Scuderi
- 1963/1964: Die Reise auf den Mond
