= Richard Van Allan =

British operatic bass singer (1935–2008)

Richard Van Allan CBE (28 May 1935 – 4 December 2008) was a versatile British operatic bass singer who had a lengthy career.

He sang varied repertoire at Covent Garden and English National Opera, as well as at important houses worldwide. With his distinctive profile and memorable stage presence, he made a strong impression in many roles, from Wagner, Verdi and Mozart, to Gilbert and Sullivan. The Times wrote that he embodied "all the virtues that make the complete artist – vocal beauty and technique, musicianship, language, dramatic ability, stylistic authority".

== Biography ==
Richard Van Allan was born in Clipstone, Nottinghamshire, on 28 May 1935. He grew up in Derbyshire, singing in the church choir in Bolsover and participated in Gilbert and Sullivan operas at Brunts grammar school in Mansfield. He left school without finishing, becoming a police cadet, and became a constable after completing military service in Germany, where he became more interested in singing. He studied at Worcester Teacher Training College, during which he sang in concerts and performed in more amateur Gilbert and Sullivan productions.

=== Career ===
Van Allan taught science in Birmingham while studying voice with David Franklin at the Birmingham School of Music. In 1964, he joined the chorus of Glyndebourne Festival Opera, then Sadler's Wells. He also toured with Opera for All. Van Allan made his solo debut at Glyndebourne in 1966 as Second Priest and Second Armoured Man in Mozart's The Magic Flute. In 1967, he appeared as Osmano in Francesco Cavalli's L'Ormindo at Glyndebourne under Raymond Leppard. He sang the roles of the Speaker in The Magic Flute, Johann in Massenet's Werther, and in 1969 he alternated in the title role and as Leporello in Don Giovanni for Sadler's Wells at the London Coliseum. In 1970 he created the role of Colonel Lord Francis Jowler in the premiere of Nicholas Maw's The Rising of the Moon at Glyndebourne.

He made his 1971 Covent Garden debut as the Mandarin in Puccini's Turandot. He became a regular artist at the Royal Opera House in the 1970s and 1980s in the Mozart/Da Ponte operas, as well as Fidelio, Nabucco, Carmen and La bohème. He sang Leporello in Don Giovanni with Glyndebourne Touring Opera. He also sang with Welsh National Opera, beginning in 1969, in the leading bass roles in La Cenerentola, Rigoletto, Macbeth, Nabucco, The Barber of Seville, Aida and Ernani.

Van Allan returned to Sadler's Wells in the title role of Don Giovanni, in John Gielgud's production. He later sang Leporello with English National Opera (Sadler's Wells's new name), as well as the Grand Inquisitor and later King Philip II in Don Carlos (Verdi), the title role in Boris Godunov (Mussorgsky), Baron Ochs in Der Rosenkavalier (Richard Strauss), the title role in Don Quichotte (Massenet), Count Almavivia in The Marriage of Figaro (Mozart), Procida in I Vespri Siciliani (Verdi), Mazeppa (Tchaikovsky), Padre Guardiano in La forza del destino (Verdi), Mephistofeles in both Gounod's and Berlioz's versions of Faust, Mustafà (Rossini), and one of his most admired parts, Claggart in Benjamin Britten's Billy Budd, among many other roles. He was the original Pooh-Bah in ENO's acclaimed version of The Mikado, one of his favourite parts at ENO.

Overseas, he appeared at the Opéra National de Paris and elsewhere in France, La Monnaie in Brussels, the Wexford Festival in Ireland, Teatro Colón in Buenos Aires, San Diego Opera (where he sang his first Baron Ochs in Der Rosenkavalier in 1976), the Metropolitan Opera (where he finally made his debut in 1987 as Count des Grieux in Massenet's Manon), Boston, Miami and Seattle.

His concert performances included Beethoven's Ninth symphony, Bruckner's Mass in F minor, Dvořák's Te Deum, and Berlioz's L'enfance du Christ and The Damnation of Faust (with Sir Simon Rattle). From 1986 to 2001 Van Allan was director of the National Opera Studio (succeeding Michael Langdon). He was appointed a Commander of the Order of the British Empire (CBE) in 2001.

=== Later years ===
In his later career, his performances became less frequent. However, he continued to tackle new roles. He created the role of Tiresias in the world premiere of John Buller's The Bacchae (1992) with English National Opera. Also in 1992, he sang the role of Davenant in The Vampyr: A Soap Opera, a television miniseries based on Heinrich Marschner's opera Der Vampyr. In 1994 at the English National Opera, he sang the title role in Massenet's Don Quichotte for the first time. Also at ENO, he sang the Man Without a Conscience in Nigel Osborne's Goya opera Terrible Mouth, and King Hildebrand in Ken Russell's much criticised production of Gilbert and Sullivan's Princess Ida. He performed in Madrid as Don Jerome in the first staged performances of Robert Gerhard's The Duenna, and in Florence as Swallow in Peter Grimes. At Glyndebourne, he played the comic speaking role of Frosch in Die Fledermaus in the autumn of 2006. His last performance was as Folz in Wagner's Die Meistersinger von Nürnberg at the 2006 Edinburgh Festival.

Van Allan died of lung cancer on 4 December 2008, aged 73, survived by his wife, Rosemary, and children Guy and Emma. Another son, Robert, predeceased him.

== Discography ==
Audio recordings

- Rutland Boughton: Bethlehem
- Jonathan Dove: Flight
- Gilbert and Sullivan: The Mikado, as Pooh-Bah with ENO (1986) and Telarc (1992), and the title role with BBC (1989)
- Gilbert and Sullivan: The Pirates of Penzance, as the Sergeant of Police (1993, Telarc)
- Gilbert and Sullivan: H.M.S. Pinafore, as Bill Bobstay (1994, Telarc)
- Franco Leoni: L'Oracolo (with Tito Gobbi and Joan Sutherland)
- Mozart: Così fan tutte (with Montserrat Caballé and Janet Baker, conducted by Sir Colin Davis; Grammy Award, 1976)
- Mozart: Don Giovanni twice (under Colin Davis and Bernard Haitink)
- Rossini: Il Turco in Italia (with Mirella Freni and James Morris, conducted by Leonard Bernstein, 1983)
- Tchaikovsky: Eugene Onegin
- Vaughan Williams: Hugh the Drover
- Verdi: Luisa Miller (with Caballé and Luciano Pavarotti)
- Verdi: La traviata, as Marchese d'Obigny (with Beverly Sills and Nicolai Gedda)
- William Walton: Troilus and Cressida (with Janet Baker)
- Kurt Weill: Street Scene
- other operas of Berlioz, Bizet, Britten, Donizetti, Offenbach, Puccini, Rossini, and Verdi
- Kismet
- Oliver!
- Song of Norway

Video and film recordings

- Berlioz: L'enfance du Christ (1986; as Herodes)
- Britten: Gloriana (1984; as Raleigh; conducted by Sir Charles Mackerras)
- Britten: The Rape of Lucretia (1987; ENO, as Junius; with Anthony Rolfe Johnson, Jean Rigby, and Alan Opie; conducted by Lionel Friend; directed by Michael Simpson)
- Britten: Billy Budd
- Britten: Albert Herring (1985; as Mr Budd)
- Gilbert and Sullivan: The Mikado (1986; ENO, as Pooh Bah)
- Gilbert and Sullivan: Iolanthe (1982; Brent Walker, as Private Willis)
- Mozart: The Magic Flute (2003; Second Priest)
- Prokofiev: The Love for Three Oranges (1982; as Tchélio)
- Purcell: The Fairy-Queen (1995; with Yvonne Kenny; conducted by Nicholas Kok)
- Stravinsky: The Rake's Progress (with Felicity Lott, Samuel Ramey, Rosalind Elias, under Bernard Haitink; designed by David Hockney)
- Verdi: La traviata (1994; as Baron Duphol; under Sir Georg Solti)
- "The Temptation of Franz Schubert" (1997 television film; also known as "The Double Life of Franz Schubert"; as Johann).
