= María Markan =

Icelandic soprano (1905–1995)

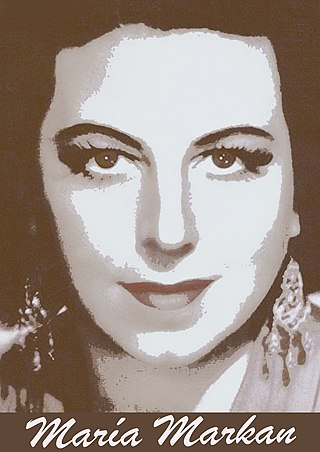
- Born: María (Einarsdóttir) Markan; 25 June 1905; Ólafsvík, Iceland
- Died: 15 May 1995 (aged 89); Reykjavík, Iceland
- Occupation: soprano
- Spouse: Georg Östlund (m. 1942)
- Children: 1

María Markan (25 June 1905 – 15 May 1995) was an Icelandic soprano. She was among the most talented Icelandic singers of her generation and performed in leading opera houses, including Glyndebourne, the Royal Danish Theater in Copenhagen, and the Metropolitan Opera in New York.

== Career ==
María Markan (born María Einarsdóttir) was born in Ólafsvík but raised in Reykjavík, the daughter of state accountant Einar Markússon and his wife, Kristín Árnadóttir. She grew up in a musical household and began studying piano at age 8; three of her siblings (Einar, Sigurður, and Elísabet) would also become singers. Later she studied at Kvennaskólinn í Reykjavík (Reykjavík Women's College), intending to become a nurse, but decided to focus on music instead. She gave her first public concert in Reykjavík in 1930. Later she studied in Berlin with Ella Schmücker, who was a student of Pauline Viardot. Markan gave her debut in Berlin in 1935 and was hired to the Schiller Opera in Hamburg later that same year.

In the following years, Markan appeared frequently in Germany and Scandinavia. Among her main roles were Agathe in Der Freischütz, Leonora in Il trovatore, the Queen of the Night in The Magic Flute, and Santuzza in Cavalleria rusticana. In 1938, she sang the role of the Countess in Mozart's The Marriage of Figaro at the Royal Opera in Copenhagen. There, the conductor Fritz Busch heard her and immediately hired her to sing the same role at the Glyndebourne opera in England.

In autumn 1939, Markan embarked on a six-month concert tour of Australia. From there she went to Canada and finally to New York, where she was employed at the Metropolitan Opera in 1941–1942. The New York Times devoted an article to her appointment, claiming that she was "among those groomed to fill the roles of Kirsten Flagstad, who will not return from Norway next season." Markan's career at the Metropolitan Opera came to a sudden end; in her autobiography, published in 1965, she revealed that the reason had been a local tabloid's smear campaign about her supposed involvement with Nazism. The truth, she maintained in her biography, was that the Nazis had offered her a position at a leading opera house, which she declined.

In 1942 she married Georg Östlund, and they lived in New York, Canada, and eventually moved back to Iceland in 1955. Their son, Pétur Östlund, is a well-known musician.

Following her return to Iceland, Markan ran her own singing school in Reykjavík, until she retired at the age of 73 in 1978. She appeared on stage rather infrequently after her return, but these included performances of Cavalleria rusticana at the National Theater in 1955 (her first opera role in Iceland), and The Magic Flute in 1956, as well as concert appearances with the Iceland Symphony Orchestra.

Markan made many recordings. Most of her recordings were 78-rpm recordings, made in 1930, 1933, and 1937. She also recorded several songs in 1955. A 3-LP compendium of her recordings (María Markan: Hljóðritanir 1929–1970) was released in 1988.

María Markan also composed songs of her own, particularly early in her career. One of her songs, Svanahljómar, was released in 1930 on a Columbia Records 78-rpm record, performed by her brother, Einar Markan, and the Austrian pianist Franz Mixa. This is the earliest recorded example of music by an Icelandic woman.

== Awards and recognitions ==
Markan was made Commander of the Icelandic Order of the Falcon in 1940, and a Grand Commander (stórriddari) in 1980. She was an honorary member of the Society of Icelandic Musicians (Félag íslenskra tónlistarmanna) and the Society of Icelandic Singers (Félag íslenskra einsöngvara).
