= Margaret Cooper (singer) =

Background information
- Born: Margaret Gernon Cooper; 28 June 1877; Walworth, London, England
- Died: 27 December 1922 (aged 45) Cricklewood, London, England
- Genre: Music hall
- Occupation: Singer
- Instruments: Piano
- Years active: c.1900–1919

Margaret Gernon Cooper (28 June 1877 – 27 December 1922) was an English music hall performer, the first such female performer to sing to her own piano accompaniment.

== Life and career ==
She was born in Walworth, London, the daughter of a bakery and shop owner, and grew up in the Paddington area. She was a talented musician; learned piano, violin and organ; and attended the Royal Academy of Music. She performed as an accompanist and sang at dinners and concerts.

She was seen playing at a charity concert by theatre manager Alfred Butt, the manager of the Palace Theatre, a music hall in Cambridge Circus. Although singing at the piano in public had previously been restricted to men, Butt persuaded Cooper to appear on stage, and she made her first public performance at the theatre in October 1906. She was immediately successful, and later the same month appeared in Bristol, billed as "The Latest London Sensation".

A soprano, but with a thin voice, she initially sang sentimental songs, but gradually introduced more humorous – but tasteful – material into her act, such as "Waltz Me Around Again, Willie". The theatre historian W. J. MacQueen-Pope wrote:

Beautifully dressed, she would sail onto the stage and acknowledge the welcoming applause with a short, sharp, spasmodic smile... Then, she would seat herself, taking off her elbow length gloves with great care and in the most leisurely manner and then proceed to remove her numerous rings and bracelets, which she placed one at a time and with considerable exactitude of touch on top of the piano. It was a routine that the audience watched spellbound with apparent enjoyment. And then, she would begin...

Cooper performed in a wide range of venues, all over the country; sang and played at private parties including those arranged for the royal family; and toured Australia and New Zealand in 1912. Between 1907 and 1919, she also made a number of recordings for His Master's Voice. Her performing style was parodied by H. G. Pélissier, who would exaggerate her preparations by carefully placing a handkerchief and the song's words on the top of the piano, then meticulously adjusting the music stool.

She married a teacher, Arthur Maughan Humble-Crofts, in 1910. He gave up his career to manage her activities, and they lived in Cricklewood. During the First World War, she entertained troops in hospitals while her husband worked for the Admiralty. He died from pneumonia in November 1918, and she gave few performances after his death.

She was intending to marry musical theatre star Harry Welchman, who was in the process of divorcing his wife, but Cooper died at home in Cricklewood in 1922, aged 45, from heart failure after a period of illness.
