= Alexander Kipnis =

Russian and American singer (1891–1978)

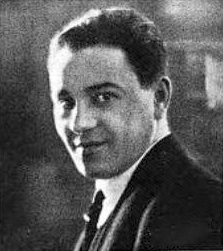
- In the Music Trade Indicator, April 7, 1928
- Born: February 13, 1891; Zhitomir, Russian Empire
- Died: May 14, 1978 (aged 87); Westport, Connecticut, US
- Occupation: Opera singer
- Spouse: Mildred Eleanor Levy (m. 1925)

Alexander Kipnis (February 13 [O.S. February 1] 1891 – May 14, 1978) was a Russian and American bass singer. Having initially established his artistic reputation in Europe, Kipnis became an American citizen in 1931, following his marriage to an American. He appeared often at the Chicago Opera before making his belated début at the Metropolitan Opera in New York City in 1940.

== Early life ==
Aleksandr Kipnis was born in Zhitomir, the capital of the Volhynian Governorate, in the Russian Empire (today part of Ukraine). His impoverished family of seven lived in a Jewish ghetto. After his father died, when he was aged 12, he helped support the family as a carpenter's apprentice and by singing soprano in local synagogues and in Bessarabia (now Moldova) until his voice changed. As a teenager he took part in a Yiddish theatrical group, until he entered the Warsaw Conservatory at age 19. The conservatory did not require a high-school diploma. His education included the study of the trombone, double bass and conducting. All the while he continued to sing in synagogues. On the recommendation of the choirmaster, he traveled to Berlin and studied voice with Ernst Grenzebach who was also a teacher of Lauritz Melchior, Meta Seinemeyer, and Max Lorenz. At the same time he sang second bass in Monti's Operetta Theater.

When the First World War started, Kipnis was interned as an alien in a German holding camp. While singing to himself he was overheard by an army captain whose brother was general manager of the Wiesbaden Opera. Kipnis was released from custody and he was engaged by the Hamburg Opera. He made his operatic debut in 1915, singing three Johann Strauss songs as a "guest" in the party scene of the operetta Die Fledermaus. In 1917, he moved to the Wiesbaden Opera, having gained invaluable stage experience. He sang in more than 300 performances at Wiesbaden until 1922, when he joined the Berlin Staatsoper.

== International career ==
The following year Kipnis visited the United States with a touring Wagnerian company. For nine seasons, between 1923 and 1932, he was on the roster of the Chicago Civic Opera. In 1927, at the Bayreuth Festival, he appeared as Gurnemanz in Wagner's Parsifal under Karl Muck and recorded the Good Friday Music under Siegfried Wagner. (A purported live performance recording in 1933 under Richard Strauss has been generally discounted.) He also appeared at the Salzburg Festival.

Kipnis was under contract with the Berlin Opera until 1935, when he was able to break his contract and flee Nazi Germany. He appeared for three seasons as a guest performer with the Vienna State Opera in 1936–1938. Just after the Anschluss he left Europe and settled permanently in the United States. By the time he was finally signed by the Metropolitan in 1940 he had appeared in most of the world's major opera houses. In addition to those European and American theatres already mentioned in this article, he was heard at the United Kingdom's foremost venue for singers, the Royal Opera House, Covent Garden, (in 1927 and 1929–1935), and also at the Teatro Colón in Buenos Aires (1926–1936).

Kipnis was regarded throughout the inter-war years as being one of the greatest basses in the world. He was praised for the beauty of his smooth and mellow voice and the excellence of his musicianship. As befitted his status, he was invited to appear with the top conductors of his day. They included Ernest Ansermet, John Barbirolli, Thomas Beecham, Leo Blech, Fritz Busch, Albert Coates, Karl Elmendorff, Wilhelm Furtwängler, Robert Heger, Herbert von Karajan, Josef Krips, Erich Kleiber, Otto Klemperer, Hans Knappertsbusch, Serge Koussevitzky, Erich Leinsdorf, Willem Mengelberg, Dimitri Mitropoulos, Pierre Monteux, Karl Muck, Arthur Nikisch, Eugene Ormandy, Hans Pfitzner, Fritz Reiner, Artur Rodziński, Hans Rosbaud, Hermann Scherchen, Richard Strauss, George Szell, Arturo Toscanini, Bruno Walter and Felix Weingartner.

Kipnis showed signs of vocal deterioration during the 1940s and he retired from the Met in 1946. He made his last concert appearance in 1951. Since his debut in 1915, he had sung at least 108 roles, often in more than one language, and his performances in opera and oratorio numbered more than 1600. He died in Westport, Connecticut in 1978, aged 87.

== Critical appreciation ==
Among Kipnis's most celebrated roles were the bass parts in operas by Mozart and Wagner, as well as the title role in Mussorgsky's Boris Godunov and the part of Rocco in Fidelio by Beethoven. In Germany he also was renowned as a Verdi singer. He was a distinguished interpreter of German lieder and Russian songs, too.

During the 1920s and 1930s, Kipnis's chief bass rivals were the Italians Nazzareno De Angelis, Ezio Pinza and Tancredi Pasero in the Verdi repertoire, and the Norwegian Ivar Andresen in the Wagner repertoire.

== Family ==
In 1925, Kipnis married Mildred Eleanor Levy. Their son Igor Kipnis was a harpsichordist.

== Recordings ==
CD reissues of his recorded work include:

- The Best of Alexander Kipnis – arias and songs by Wagner, Mozart, Verdi, Gounod, Brahms, Meyerbeer, Wolf and Halevy in recordings selected by his son, Igor Kipnis, and issued by Pearl (Pavilion Records Ltd.), GEMM CD 9451.
- "Alexander Kipnis, Mussorgsky, Boris Godunov" contains excerpts from Boris recorded in 1945 by RCA and a selection of Russian arias and songs. album 60522-2-RG
- Austrian Preiser Records issued several well-filled CD recitals devoted to Kipnis.
- German TIM AG, Die Zauberflöte, 2 CD's. Kipnis as Sarastro, Vienna Philharmonic (conducted by Toscanini) 1937 Order No. 205179 EAN 4011222051790

== Sources ==
- Shawe-Taylor, Desmond: "Kipnis, Alexander" in The New Grove Dictionary of Opera, ed. Stanley Sadie (London, 1992) ISBN 0-333-73432-7
