= Aulikki Rautawaara =

Finnish opera singer

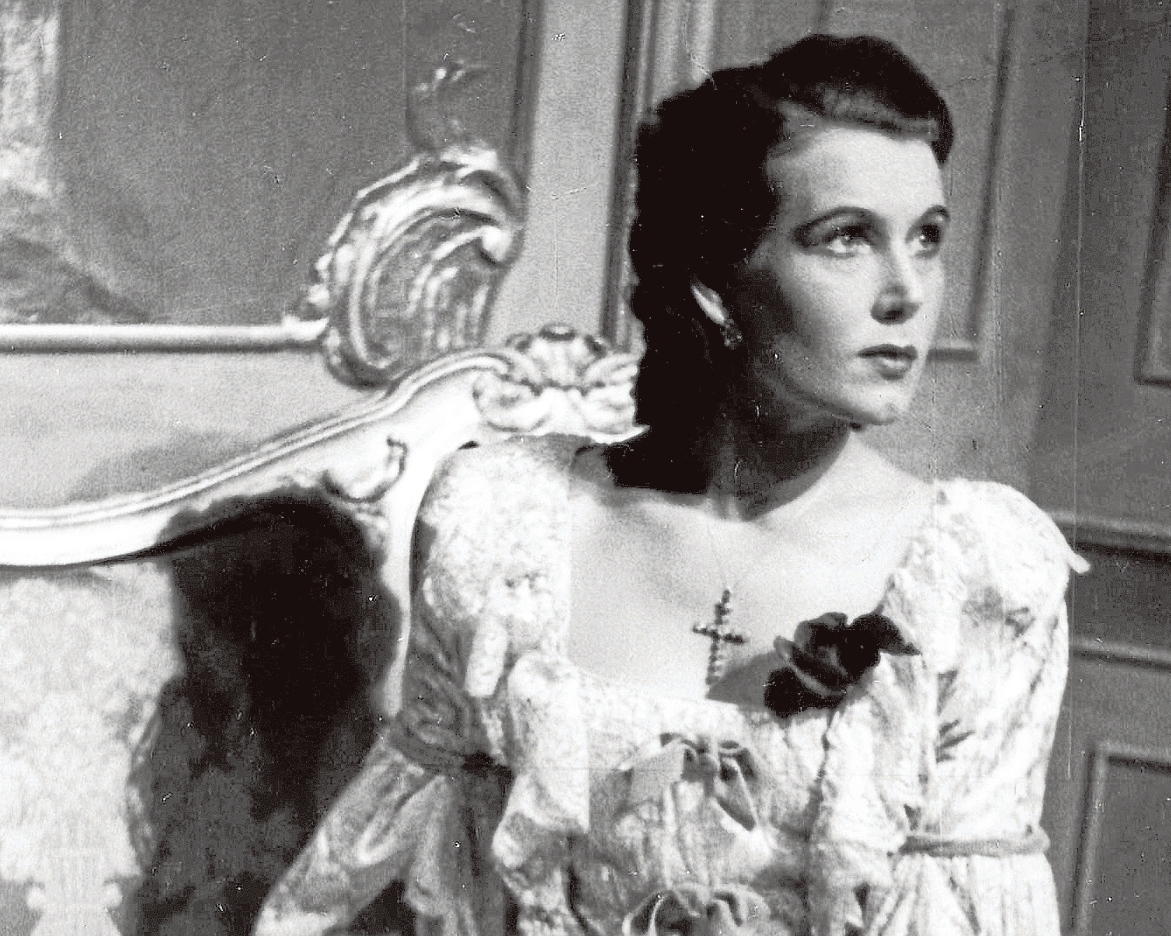
Aulikki Rautawaara as the Countess in Le nozze di Figaro

Terttu Aulikki Rautawaara (2 May 1906 — 29 December 1990) was a Finnish soprano. She was famous for her interpretation of works by Edvard Grieg and Jean Sibelius, including some of the first recordings of Sibelius made outside Scandinavia. She played the part of Countess Almaviva in Mozart's The Marriage of Figaro, in the first ever opera performed at the Glyndebourne festival (1934), and continued to play a number of parts in operas staged in Glyndebourne in the 1930s. She recorded many duets with Peter Anders, among others. She also appeared in British and German films in the 1930s (e.g. the German comedy Alles hört auf mein Kommando). In 1945, Jean Sibelius dedicated the Hymn to Thaïs to her.

Aulikki Rautawaara was born in Vaasa. She was briefly married to the Finnish composer Erik Bergman, from 1956 to 1958, that being her third marriage. She died in Helsinki.
