= Christina Gansch =

Austrian operatic soprano (born 1990)

Christina Gansch (born 1990) is an Austrian operatic soprano. She won first prize in the 2014 Kathleen Ferrier Competition.

== Life and career ==
Born in St. Pölten, during her school time Gansch studied at the Konservatorium für Kirchenmusik of the Roman Catholic Diocese of Sankt Pölten, went to the Mozarteum University Salzburg in 2008, graduated there in 2012 with distinction and won some prizes. She attended master classes with Michèle Crider, Edita Gruberová, Angelika Kirchschlager, and Thomas Moser and continued her studies at the Royal Academy of Music in London.

Her international opera debut took place in September 2013 as Amor in Gluck's Orfeo ed Euridice at the Opéra national de Montpellier. This was followed by appearances at the Verbier Festival in Switzerland, at the "Resonanzen-Festival" in Vienna and at the Wigmore Hall in London. In March 2013 she played Barbarina in Le nozze di Figaro at the Theater an der Wien – in the context of the concert performance Da-Ponte-cycle with the Concentus Musicus Wien directed by Nikolaus Harnoncourt, receiving favourable reviews.

From 2014 to 2016 she was a member of the international opera studio at the Hamburg State Opera and in the 2016/2017 season a member of the ensemble at this house, where she performed Pamina in The Magic Flute, Constance in Dialogues des Carmélites, the title role in Handel's Almira and Gemmy in Rossini's William Tell among other roles.

== Awards ==
- 2011: Internationaler Gesangswettbewerb Passau: Besondere Sängerbegabung prize
- 2013: Gesangswettbewerb Ferruccio Tagliavini, Deutschlandsberg: 1st Prize in the 2nd section and soprano Award
- 2013: Cesti-Wettbewerb, Innsbruck: 2nd prize, Alte Vestersjø, Newcomer prize and special prize.
- 2014: Kathleen Ferrier Award, first prize
