= Walburga Wegner =

German operatic soprano (1908–1993)

Walburga Wegner (25 August 1908 in Cologne – 23 February 1993 idem at age 84) was a German operatic soprano who appeared at major opera houses internationally and made recordings.
