= David Franklin (broadcaster) =

Opera singer and broadcaster

Franklin as Baron Ochs in Der Rosenkavalier, Covent Garden, 1947

Henry Cyril Franklin (17 May 1908 – 22 October 1973), known professionally as David Franklin, was an English opera singer and broadcaster. His professional singing career, which began in 1936, was twice cut short, first by army service in the Second World War and then by a throat operation in 1951, which badly affected his singing voice and forced him to retire. He made a second career as a writer and broadcaster, becoming known to a wider public through his appearances on the BBC radio shows My Music and Twenty Questions.

== Early years ==
Franklin was born in London in 1908, the son of Henry James Franklin, a joiner, and his wife Jane Maria, née Chapman. He was educated at Alleyn's School, Dulwich, and St Catharine's College, Cambridge, and worked as a schoolmaster from 1930 to 1935, singing as a pastime. In 1931 he married Hilda Bickell, with whom he had two sons and two daughters; the sons both died in infancy.

After lessons from the singing teacher Jani Strasser, Franklin auditioned for Fritz Busch, the musical director of Glyndebourne and was invited to perform at the 1936 Glyndebourne Festival, playing the Commendatore in Don Giovanni and the Second Priest in The Magic Flute. In the latter work he was promoted to the role of Sarastro for the 1937 Festival, in succession to Alexander Kipnis. The Times said of him:

The upper part of Mr Franklin's voice is perhaps rather lacking in resonance at present, but that will no doubt develop in so young a singer. His low notes are already full and sonorous; we cannot remember having heard a low F sung with such beautiful tone. To his vocal quality Mr Franklin adds an unusual stature and a dignity of well-timed gesture that make him ideal in the part.

In 1938 he again sang the Commendatore and added Banquo in the English premiere of Verdi's Macbeth, to the Macbeth of Francesco Valentino. In addition to opera, during the late 1930s he established himself as, in the words of The Times, one of the country's leading oratorio basses.

== Covent Garden ==
After war-time service Franklin appeared at Sadler's Wells in 1946 as Sir James Pinchbeck (Cancian) in the first performance in England of I quattro rusteghi and then joined the new resident company at Covent Garden as principal bass until a throat condition ended his singing career in 1951. He created the role of Mars in the premiere of Arthur Bliss's The Olympians, and in the Italian repertoire he sang Sparafucile in Rigoletto, Ramfis in Aida and Colline in La bohème.

In the German opera repertoire Franklin played Sarastro, Rocco in Fidelio, King Mark in Tristan und Isolde, Hunding in Die Walküre, Fafner in Das Rheingold and Siegfried, Pogner in Die Meistersinger and, a part for which he was particularly well known, Baron Ochs in Der Rosenkavalier. (Note: The widow of the librettist Hugo von Hofmannsthal praised his performance as Ochs "because of its razor-edge balance between breeding and decadence". Another critic wrote that Ochs could seldom have been played with such vocal and histrionic skill as Franklin brought to the role.) His other roles included Zuniga in Carmen and Pimen in Boris Godunov. The Times commented, "in all these parts his resonant, deep bass of uncommon range and his height and dignity of bearing were great assets".

During Franklin's time at Covent Garden almost all performances were given in English, a practice with which he was strongly in sympathy. He placed a high value on putting across the drama of operas, which he felt was best done in the vernacular. After he retired from singing he appeared again at Covent Garden in the speaking role of Zamiel, the demon "Black Huntsman" in Der Freischütz in 1956.

== Later career ==
An operation to treat an enlarged thyroid badly damaged Franklin's singing voice and led to his retirement from professional singing in 1951. He turned to writing and broadcasting. He wrote the libretto for Phyllis Tate's opera The Lodger. From 1967 to 1973 he was a team member on the light-hearted BBC radio quiz My Music. He also became the chairman of the long-running radio panel game Twenty Questions from 1970 to 1972, in succession to Stewart MacPherson, Gilbert Harding and Kenneth Horne. In 1970 he published an autobiography, Basso Cantante, which Alan Blyth described in The Musical Times as "an outspoken, wise, amusing book from which both singers and the layman can learn much".

Franklin died of a heart attack on 22 October 1973 at Ronkswood Hospital, Worcester. He was survived by his wife and daughters.
