= John Brownlee (baritone) =

Australian opera singer (1900–1969)

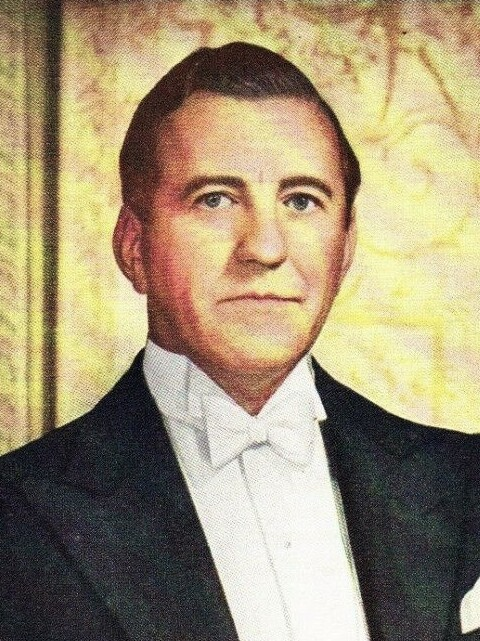
- Brownlee in 1947
- Born: 7 January 1900; Geelong, Victoria, Australia
- Died: 10 January 1969 (aged 69); New York City, US
- Occupations: Operatic baritone; Academic teacher
- Organizations: Royal Opera House; Paris Opera; Metropolitan Opera; Manhattan School of Music

John Donald Mackenzie Brownlee (7 January 1900 – 10 January 1969) was an Australian operatic baritone and academic teacher. For most of his professional career he was based in Europe and then the United States.

== Biography ==
John Brownlee was born in Geelong, Victoria. As a boy, he became a junior naval cadet in the Royal Australian Navy, serving during World War I. Following service, he studied accounting. He entered a singing contest in Ballarat, winning first prize even though he had never had a lesson. Several singing engagements followed. One of these, a performance of Handel's Messiah, was attended by Nellie Melba, who convinced him to go to Paris for serious study with Dinh Gilly. His debut took place at Covent Garden on 8 June 1926, in the performance of Puccini's La bohème in which Melba made her farewell appearance. That autumn he was engaged by the Paris Opera, the first time a British subject had been made a permanent member of that company; his Paris debut was in Thaïs in 1927.

In 1934, he appeared as a singer in the British film The Private Life of Don Juan.

On 17 February 1937, he appeared for the first time at the Metropolitan Opera, as Verdi's Rigoletto. Besides making important appearances elsewhere, Brownlee remained a regular at Covent Garden, the Paris Opera, and the Met, making his last performance there in March 1957.

Brownlee's greatest successes were in the Mozart repertory, particularly at the Glyndebourne Festival. He was also acclaimed in Salome and Pelléas et Mélisande. In 1943, he starred as "The Vagabond King" at New York's Shubert Theatre. After retiring from singing, Brownlee became a stage director, making his debut at the Met on 27 November 1958 in a performance of Die Fledermaus by J. Strauss.

Brownlee joined the voice faculty of Manhattan School of Music in 1953 and headed the opera department. He was appointed director (a title later changed to President) of the school, the second in the school's history, in 1956, leading a major expansion that included a successful $9.5 million fund-raising campaign and a move from the school's original East Harlem location to its current site at 130 Claremont Avenue in Morningside Heights.

Brownlee died in New York in 1969, and was buried in Ferncliff Cemetery, Hartsdale, New York. An Australian scholarship in his name was first awarded after his death in 1969.

== Recordings ==
He can be heard on CD in the title role of Don Giovanni, and as Don Alfonso in Così fan tutte, both Glyndebourne productions with Fritz Busch conducting, as the Count in The Marriage of Figaro, and as Mercutio in Roméo et Juliette.

== Personal life ==
He married former Countess Donna Carla Oddone di Feletto in Paris on 29 November 1928, and the couple had a daughter and two sons.
