= Willi Domgraf-Fassbaender =

German opera singer

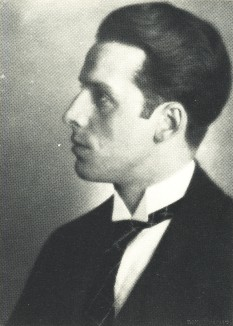
Willi Domgraf-Fassbaender.

Willi Domgraf-Fassbaender (19 February 1897, Aachen – 13 February 1978, Nuremberg) was a German operatic baritone, particularly associated with Mozart and Verdi roles. He is considered to have been one of the best lyric baritones of the inter-war period.

== Life and career ==
Domgraf-Fassbaender studied first in Berlin with Jacques Stuckgold and Paul Bruns, and later in Milan with the prominent Italian dramatic tenor Giuseppe Borgatti (who also taught the English tenor Heddle Nash). His stage debut occurred in 1922 in his native Aachen, as Almaviva in Nozze di Figaro.

He sang at the Deutsche Oper Berlin from 1923 to 1925, at the Düsseldorf opera house from 1925 to 1927, at the Staatstheater Stuttgart from 1927 to 1930 and finally at the Berlin Staatsoper from 1930 until 1948. Domgraf-Fassbaender was invited to sing at the Glyndebourne Festival in England from the festival's foundation in 1934 until 1937, performing Mozart roles. He also appeared at the Salzburg Festival in Austria in 1937, as Papageno in The Magic Flute. After the Second World War, he performed mostly in Vienna, Munich, Hannover, and Nuremberg, where he was resident producer at the latter city's opera house from 1953 to 1962.

In 1954, he began teaching at the Meistersinger-Konservatorium in Nuremberg, where he trained his daughter, mezzo-soprano Brigitte Fassbaender. He was married to the actress Sabine Peters.

Domgraf-Fassbaender had a voice, which he used with sensitive musicianship and an excellent technique. He was an accomplished singer-actor as well, appearing in a few musical films. Domgraf-Fassbaender left a sizeable legacy of audio recordings, many of which are available on CD reissues.

== Selected filmography ==
- Theodor Körner (1932)
- The Marriage of Figaro (1949)

== Sources ==
- Dictionnaire des interprètes, Alain Pâris, (Éditions Robert Laffont, SA, Paris, 1989) ISBN 2-221-06660-X
- The Concise Oxford Dictionary of Opera [second edition], (Oxford University Press, London, 1980).
