= Robert Heger =

German conductor and composer (1886–1978)

Robert Heger (19 August 1886 – 14 January 1978) was a German conductor and composer from Strasbourg, Alsace-Lorraine.

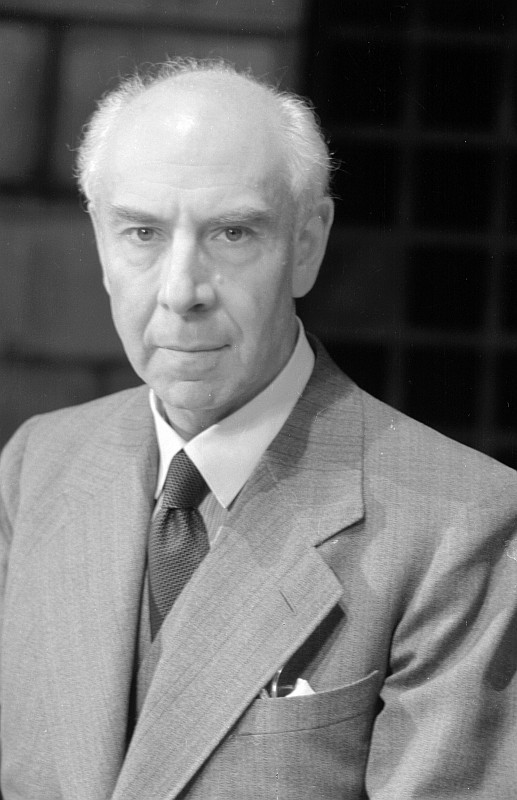
Robert Heger, conductor at the Deutsche Oper Berlin, 1945-1948

== Life and career ==
He studied at the Conservatory of Strasbourg under Franz Stockhausen, then in Zurich under Lothar Kempter and finally in Munich under Max von Schillings. After early conducting engagements in Strasbourg he made his debut at Ulm in 1908 or 1909. He held appointments in Barmen (1909), at the Vienna Volksoper (1911), and at Nuremberg (1913), where he also conducted Philharmonic concerts. He went on to Munich and Vienna, where he recorded a magnificent version of Goldmark's Rustic Wedding Symphony with the Vienna Philharmonic; and then to Berlin (1933-1950), where a live wartime Lohengrin was preserved and afterwards issued on LP, after which he returned again to Munich.

In 1932, he conducted the Vienna Symphony Orchestra and one-armed pianist Paul Wittgenstein in the world premiere of Maurice Ravel's Piano Concerto for the Left Hand, after Arturo Toscanini had declined Ravel's invitation to conduct the premiere.

In 1937, Heger joined the Nazi Party. Heger conducted one of the final concerts of the Berlin Philharmonic on 12 April 1945 at the Berlin the Philharmonic Hall, 4 days before the Red Army started the Battle of Berlin. The Berliner played Wagner’s Brünnhilde's last aria and the finale from Götterdammerung, Beethoven's Violin Concerto and Bruckner's Romantic Symphony, in attendance of the Albert Speer and Admiral Karl Dönitz. Historical records confirm that members of the Hitler Youth offered cyanide capsules to the audience when leaving the building, to the horror of Albert Speer.

Heger conducted at the Royal Opera House, Covent Garden, from 1925 to 1935, and again with his Munich company in 1953, when he gave the first London performance of Richard Strauss's opera Capriccio. He lived to conduct stereo recordings, notably a fine rendition of Schubert's complete Rosamunde incidental music in the 1960s, before his death at 91 in Munich.

== Compositions ==
Heger composed four operas. His works include:

- The Jewess of Worms (melodrama)
- Pianoforte trio, op 14
- Songs
- A Festival at Haverslev (3-act opera, prod. Nuremberg 1919)
- Hero and Leander (symphonic drama, full orchestra) op. 12
- Violin concerto in D major op. 16
- Symphony in D minor
- A Song of Peace (choral work for soli, chorus, orchestra and organ)

== Decorations and awards ==
- 1956 Grand Merit Cross of the Federal Republic of Germany
- 1959 Bavarian Order of Merit
- 1961 Honorary Citizen of Munich
- 1961 Member of the Bavarian Academy of Fine Arts
- 1967 Austrian Cross of Honour for Science and Art, 1st class

== Sources ==
- A. Eaglefield-Hull, A Dictionary of Modern Music and Musicians (Dent, London 1924)
- H. Rosenthal and J. Warrack, Concise Oxford Dictionary of Opera (OUP, London 1974 printing)
