= Konzertvereinigung Wiener Staatsopernchor =

Austrian choir

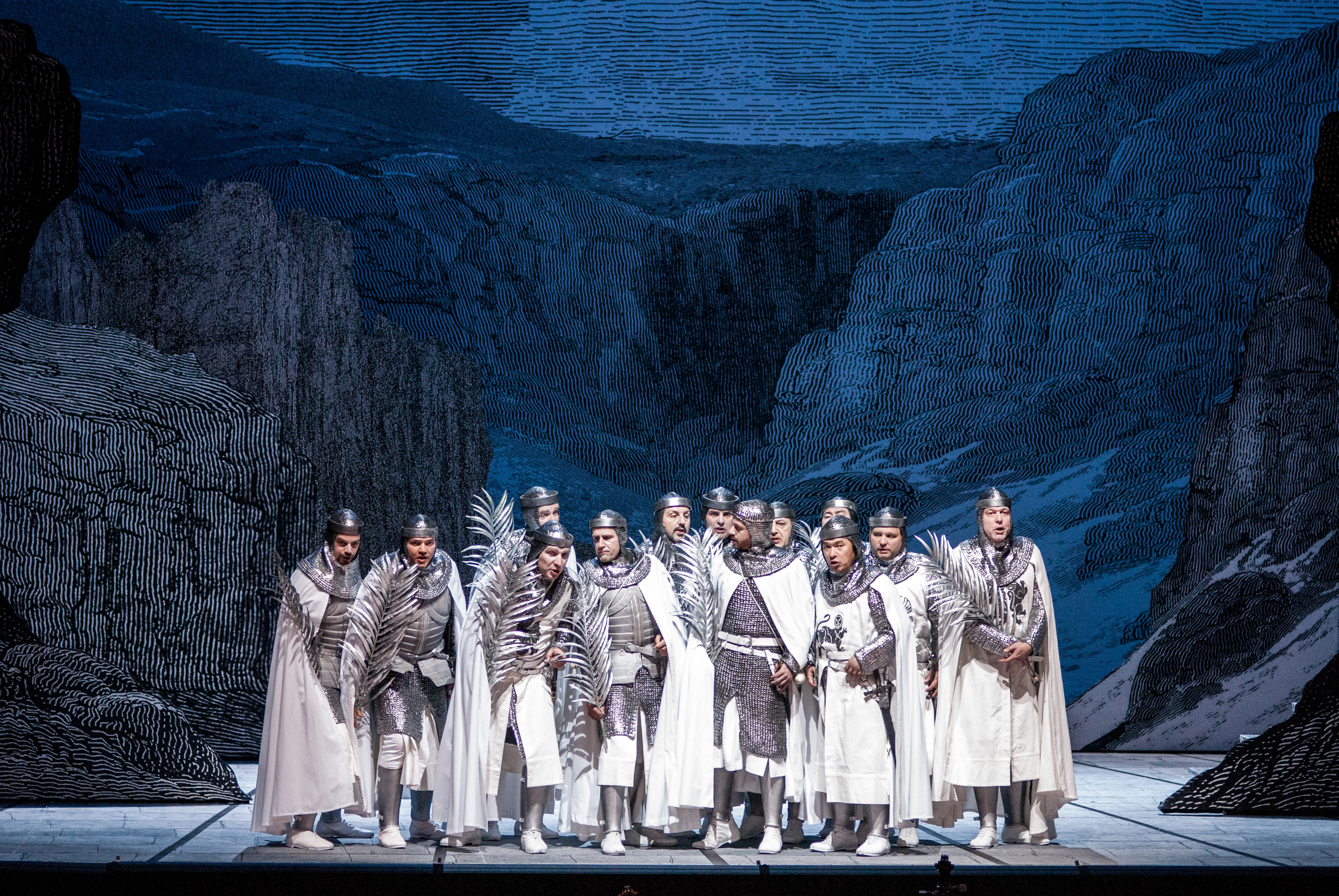
In Fierrabras, Salzburg Festival 2014

The Konzertvereinigung Wiener Staatsopernchor is an Austrian mixed choir of classical music and is formed by members from the Chor der Wiener Staatsoper.

== History ==
In 1927, Viktor Maiwald, a chorus member of the Vienna State Opera, founded the Concert Association of the Vienna State Opera Chorus in order to give the ensemble a stage presence outside the house – in the style of the Vienna Philharmonic Orchestra, which had already become independent in 1842 from the Vienna State Opera Orchestra for its own external concerts.

The choir is organised in self-administration and elects four board members, in detail a treasurer, managing director, secretary and the executive board, as well as an extended board consisting of eight voice representatives of the individual voice groups to represent their interests. who also perform representative tasks. Since its founding, the Concert Association has also appointed its own concert director from conductors with close ties to it. These include Karl Böhm, Claudio Abbado and three-time Clemens Krauss.

The choir accepts engagements for television productions, recordings and concerts. Especially the intensive participation with several simultaneous productions at the Salzburg Festival make it necessary under certain circumstances to recruit substitutes, who are selected for reinforcement after the audition selection procedure.

== Concert directors ==
Year		Conductor	Country
from	until	Conductor	Country
1927	1931	Franz Schalk	Austria
1931	1934	Clemens Krauss	Austria
1935	1936	Felix Weingartner	Austria
1936	1938	Bruno Walter	Germany | Austria
1939	1945	Clemens Krauss	Austria
1945	1947	Josef Krips	Austria
1949	1954	Clemens Krauss	Austria
1954	1981	Karl Böhm	Austria
1987	2002	Claudio Abbado	Italy
2002		Seiji Ozawa	Japan

== Recordings (selection) ==
- Claude Debussy: Pelléas et Mélisande conductor Claudio Abbado
- Johannes Brahms: Ein deutsches Requiem conductor Carlo Maria Giulini
- Wolfgang Amadeus Mozart: Requiem conductor Karl Böhm
- Richard Wagner: Lohengrin conductor Claudio Abbado
- Giuseppe Verdi: Un ballo in maschera conductor Herbert von Karajan
