= Koloman von Pataky =

Hungarian opera singer (1896–1964)

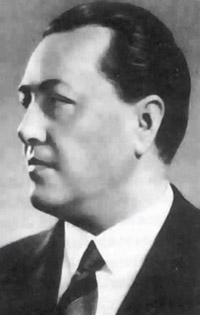
- Pataky in 1937
- Born: 14 November 1896; Unter-Limbach, Austria-Hungary
- Died: 3 March 1964 (aged 67)
- Occupation: Operatic tenor

Koloman von Pataky, real name Kálmán Pataky de Déstalva (14 November 1896 – 3 March 1964) was a Hungarian operatic tenor.

== Life and career ==
Pataky was born in Unter-Limbach, Austria-Hungary. After a short period of training he made his debut in Budapest as the Duke of Mantua. In 1926 he went to Vienna and took part in the first performance of Die ägyptische Helena by R. Strauss]]. His focus was on Italian and French music, and he made a name for himself as a Mozart singer. In 1931 he made his debut at the Salzburg Festival in Der Rosenkavalier by R. Strauss.

In 1939, Pataky sang the role of Huon in Weber's Oberon in La Scala in Milan under Tullio Serafin.

His Mozart interpretations are said to have been among the best of the 20th century. After a leg amputation he had to end his career in the 1940s.

== Filmography ==
- 1943: Mouse in the Palace.

== Bibliography ==
- Jürgen Kesting: Die großen Sänger des 20. Jahrhunderts. CormoranVerlag, 1993, ISBN 3-517-07987-1
- Christian Fastl: Pataky de Désfalva, Kálmán (Koloman von). Online-Ausgabe, Vienna 2002, ISBN 3-7001-3077-5; Druckausgabe: volume 4, Verlag der Österreichischen Akademie der Wissenschaften, Vienna 2005, ISBN 3-7001-3046-5.
