= Ina Souez =

American opera singer

- Born: Ina Rains; June 3, 1903; Windsor, Colorado, US
- Died: December 7, 1992 (aged 89); Santa Monica, California, US
- Burial place: Los Angeles National Cemetery
- Occupation(s): Soprano and jazz singer

Ina Souez (June 3, 1903 – December 7, 1992) was an American soprano and jazz singer who made her career in the United Kingdom.

== Early life ==
Born Ina Rains in Windsor, Colorado on June 3, 1903. She was of Cherokee extraction and took her maternal grandmother's name as her own when she embarked upon her career. She studied under Florence Hinman in Denver, and in 1931 traveled to Europe, taking further lessons with Sofia del Campo in Milan.

== Career ==
Souez made her debut as Mimi in Ivrea in 1928 and was soon singing at the Teatro Massimo in Palermo. In May 1929 she bowed as Liù at the Royal Opera House to the Turandot of Eva Turner. Although she was very well-received, she was not re-engaged. For the following decade she remained in England, eventually attracting the attention of Hamish Wilson, who suggested her for a position at the Glyndebourne Festival.

Souez appeared at Glyndebourne for the first time on the second night of the inaugural festival, May 29, 1934, singing Fiordiligi; married at the time to an Englishman, she was billed as an English singer. Her performance was sensationally received, and the Royal Opera House quickly engaged her for the upcoming season; this created a problem for Glyndebourne, as they had taken it for granted that she would return and so had not bothered signing her up for the following festival year. She was able to discharge both obligations but was once again not re-engaged in London.

She also sang Donna Anna for Glyndebourne, in 1936, and appeared in Stockholm and The Hague as well before returning to the United States on the outbreak of World War II. During this time she also recorded Don Giovanni and Così fan tutte, the first commercial recordings either piece would receive. Souez joined the Women's Army Corps after her return. She appeared a few more times in New York, but retired from opera to become a jazz singer in 1945.

Souez spent the next part of her career touring with Spike Jones and his band, often the butt of many of their jokes. Of the experience, she said that Jones "was offering me some real money"; she remained with him for more than ten years before retiring to teach voice in San Francisco and Los Angeles.

== Personal life ==
Souez spent the last few years of her life in a nursing home in Santa Monica, California. She is buried at the Los Angeles National Cemetery.
