= Gottfried Hornik =

Austrian operatic baritone (born 1940)

- Born: 5 August 1940 (age 85); Vienna, Austria
- Education: Vienna Academy
- Occupations: Operatic baritone; Academic teacher
- Organizations: Graz Opera; Vienna State Opera
- Title: Kammersänger

Gottfried Hornik (born 5 August 1940) is an Austrian operatic baritone and voice teacher. He was a member of the Vienna State Opera for 25 years and appeared worldwide in leading roles. His signature role was Beckmesser in Wagner's Die Meistersinger von Nürnberg. He was awarded the title of an Austrian Kammersänger.

== Life ==
=== Education and beginnings ===
Born in Vienna, Hornik studied at the Vienna Academy with teachers including Paula Köhler and Josef Witt. During his vocal studies he sang his first lyric baritone solo roles at the Stadttheater Klagenfurt, where he had his first engagement in the 1964/65 season, with roles including Papageno in Mozart's Die Zauberflöte and Silvio in Leoncavallo's Pagliacci.

From 1965 to 1976, he was engaged at the Graz Opera, where he was able to build up a broad repertoire. After initial roles such as Mozart's Figaro and Don Giovanni, he turned to Wagner, including Alberich in Der Ring des Nibelungen. At the same time he worked as a singing teacher in Graz.

=== Vienna State Opera ===
With the 1976/77 season, Hornik was engaged at the Vienna State Opera, where he performed 45 roles in 25 years. He appeared in almost 800 performances, covering roles in German, Italian, French and Russian from the 18th to the 20th century. His roles included Count Almaviva in Mozart's Le nozze di Figaro, Papageno and Speaker in Die Zauberflöte, Kurwenal in Wagner's Tristan und Isolde and Alberich, and Strauss roles Orest in Elektra, the music teacher in Ariadne auf Naxos, and especially Faninal in Der Rosenkavalier, which he sang 88 times..

In May 1995, he sang the role of Don Giulio in the world premiere of Alfred Schnittke's opera Gesualdo. In Das Traumfresserchen, an opera for children by librettist Michael Ende and composer Wilfried Hiller, he could be seen and heard as the King from September 1999 to June 2000 in performances in a tent on the roof terrace of the opera house. He also sang Mahler's Lieder eines fahrenden Gesellen in a ballet production. His last role at the house was the aged Emperor Altoum in Turandot in June 2002.

=== Beckmesser as signature role ===
Sixtus Beckmesser in Wagner's Die Meistersinger von Nürnberg became Hornik's signature role. He performed it first at the Theater Aachen, in a production presented at the Liceu in Barcelona in 1976. He appeared as Beckmesser in 1977 at the Graz Opera, in 1978 in both Vienna and at the Teatro Nacional de São Carlos in Lisbon, in 1979 at the Teatro dell'Opera di Roma, in 1981 at the Deutsche Oper Berlin and in 1993 at the Bavarian State Opera in Munich.

In the 1980/81 season, he made his U.S. debut with this role at the San Francisco Opera and in February 1993, performed it at the Metropolitan Opera in New York City. In 2001, he made a guest appearance as Beckmesser at the Santiago de Chile Opera.

=== Guest performances ===
In the 1976/77 season, Hornik appeared in the title role of Alban Berg's Wozzeck at la Scala in Milan.

In 1980 and 1981, he was engaged at the Salzburg Easter Festival as Klingsor in Wagner's Parsifal. In 1983 and 1984, he appeared as Faninal at the Salzburg Festival, with Herbert von Karajan conducting. In 1989, he returned to Salzburg as Angelotti in Puccini's Tosca.

Since the 1980s, Hornik appeared regularly at the Deutsche Oper Berlin, as 1988 as Alberich. He performed at the Paris Opera in 1981 as Faninal, at the Teatro Colón in Buenos Aires in 1983 as Papageno, at the Cologne Opera in 1983 as Klingsor, and at the Royal Opera House in London in 1987 as Faninal.

In October 1986, he first appeared at the Metropolitan Opera, again as Faninal. It was followed by over 50 performances, including Papageno, Frank in Die Fledermaus by Johann Strauss, and Wozzeck.

In 1992, he appeared as Orest at the New Music Hall (Meggaron Mousikis Athenon) in Athens. At the Graz Opera House, he performed the title role of Moses in a production of Schoenberg's Moses und Aron in 1998. In September 2007, he made another guest appearance at the Stadttheater Klagenfurt, where his career had begun in the 1960s, in the speaking role as the music teacher in Ariadne auf Naxos.

=== Teaching activities ===
Hornik taught singing at the University of Music and Performing Arts Graz from 1972 to 1978. From 1997, he held a visiting professorship there. His students included Clemens Unterreiner, Anna Siminska (soprano), and Andrejus Kalinovas (tenor).

== Roles ==
Alban Berg: Title role in Wozzeck; Hector Berlioz: Mercure in Les Troyens; Georges Bizet: Moralès in Carmen; Gaetano Donizetti: Malatesta in Don Pasquale; Gottfried von Einem: Teacher in Der Besuch der alten Dame; Umberto Giordano: Roucher in Andrea Chénier; Hans Werner Henze: Scharf in Der junge Lord; Leoš Janáček: Kuligin in Káťa Kabanová; Leoncavallo: Silvio in Der Bajazzo; Albert Lortzing: Count in Der Wildschütz; Jules Massenet: Vitellius in Hérodiade; Lescaut in Manon; Albert in Werther; Wolfgang Amadeus Mozart: Figaro and Conte Almaviva in Le nozze di Figaro; Don Alfonso in Così fan tutte; Speaker, Papageno and Second Armed Man in Die Zauberflöte; Otto Nicolai: Reich in Die lustigen Weiber von Windsor; Jacques Offenbach: Spalanzani, Lindorf, Coppélius, Miracle and Dapertutto in The Tales of Hoffmann	Hans Pfitzner: Cardinal of Lothringen and Luna in Palestrina; Giacomo Puccini: Schaunard in La bohème; Cesare Angelotti in Tosca; Larkens in La fanciulla del West; Title role and Spinelloccio in Gianni Schicchi; Altoum in Turandot; Gioachino Rossini: Fernando Villabella in La gazza ladra; Arnold Schoenberg: Moses and Ein anderer Mann (debut role at the Vienna State Opera) in Moses und Aron; Franz Schreker: Count in Der ferne Klang; Johann Strauss I: Frank in Die Fledermaus; Richard Strauss: Fifth Jew Salome; Orest in Elektra; Faninal in Der Rosenkavalier; Music Teacher in Ariadne auf Naxos; Morbio in Die schweigsame Frau; Olivier in Capriccio; Giuseppe Verdi: Douphol in La traviata; Richard Wagner: Kurwenal and Melot in Tristan und Isolde; Beckmesser in Die Meistersinger von Nürnberg; Alberich in Das Rheingold; Klingsor and Second Knight in Parsifal; Carl Maria von Weber: Ottokar in Der Freischütz; Lysiart in Euryanthe

== Recordings ==
- Mozart: Die Zauberflöte, with Edith Mathis, Karin Ott, Janet Perry, Anna Tomowa-Sintow, Agnes Baltsa, Hanna Schwarz, Francisco Araiza, José Van Dam, Berlin Philharmonic, choir of the Deutsche Oper Berlin, conductor: Herbert von Karajan (both complete opera and excerpts), Deutsche Grammophon 1980) – as Papageno
- Lortzing: Der Wildschütz, with Doris Soffel, Peter Schreier, Edith Mathis, Hans Sotin, Georgine Resick, Staatskapelle Berlin, Rundfunkchor Berlin, conductor: Bernhard Klee (LP, Deutsche Grammophon 1983) – as Count
- Mozart: Die Zauberflöte, with Barbara Hendricks, June Anderson, Ulrike Steinsky, Jerry Hadley, Robert Lloyd, Thomas Allen, Scottish Chamber Orchestra, Scottish Chamber Chorus] conductor: Sir Charles Mackerras (Telarc 1991) – as Papageno
- Richard Strauss: Capriccio, with Kiri Te Kanawa, Håkan Hagegård, Uwe Heilmann, Olaf Bär, Victor von Halem, Brigitte Fassbaender, Werner Hollweg, Anna Rita Taliento, Roberto Saccà and Hans Hotter, Vienna Philharmonic, conductor: Ulf Schirmer (Decca 1996) – as Olivier
- Johann Strauss II: Die Fledermaus, with Adrianne Pieczonka, Edita Gruberová, Carmen Oprișanu, Thomas Moser, Georg Tichy, Franz Kasemann, Martin Zauner, Jörg Schneider; Hungarian State Opera House, conductor: Friedrich Haider (Nightingale Classics 1998) – as Frank

=== Film ===
- Richard Strauss: Der Rosenkavalier, with Felicity Lott, Anne Sofie von Otter, Barbara Bonney, Kurt Moll, chorus and orchestra of the Vienna State Opera, conductor: Carlos Kleiber, director in Vienna: Otto Schenk, 13 April 1968 (Unitel, Edizioni Del Prado 2004) – as Faninal
