= Op. 98 =

In music, Op. 98 stands for Opus number 98. Compositions that are assigned this number include:

- Beethoven – An die ferne Geliebte
- Brahms – Symphony No. 4
- Dvořák – American Suite
- Milhaud – L'abandon d'Ariane
- Schubert – Wiegenlied, D 498
- Schumann – Songs from Wilhelm Meister (Lieder und Gesänge aus 'Wilhelm Meister'), Op. 98a; Requiem for Mignon, Op. 98b
- Sibelius – Suite mignonne and Suite champêtre, each for small orchestra (1921–1922)
