= Bernhard Klee =

German conductor (1936–2025)

- Klee, in the 1960s
- Born: 19 April 1936; Schleiz, Thuringia, Germany
- Died: 10 October 2025 (aged 89); Kreuzlingen, Thurgau, Switzerland
- Occupation: Conductor
- Organizations: Theater Lübeck; Radiophilharmonie Hannover; Düsseldorf Symphony Orchestra; Staatsphilharmonie Rheinland-Pfalz
- Spouse: Edith Mathis (divorced)
- Awards: Deutscher Schallplattenpreis; Wiener Flötenuhr; Preis der deutschen Schallplattenkritik

Bernhard Klee (19 April 1936 – 10 October 2025) was a German conductor and pianist. His leadership posts included terms as Generalmusikdirektor (GMD) at the Theater Lübeck from 1966 to 1973, chief conductor of the Radiophilharmonie Hannover in Hanover from 1976 to 1979, GMD in Düsseldorf from 1977 to 1987, chief conductor of the NDR Radiophilharmonie from 1991 to 1995 and of the Staatsphilharmonie Rheinland-Pfalz from 1992 to 1997, Beginning in the 1970s, he was closely associated with the BBC as a regular guest conductor of several London orchestras. He performed in Munich, Vienna, at the Salzburg Festival and in the United States, among others, and recorded extensively. As a pianist, he often accompanied his first wife, soprano Edith Mathis, in Lieder repertoire.

Klee was regarded as a renowned interpreter of Mozart, discovering rarely played works such as Zaide and recognized in awards for recordings of his music such as Deutscher Schallplattenpreis and Wiener Flötenuhr. He made significant contributions to the performance of contemporary music, conducting world premieres of works by Hans-Jürgen von Bose, Wolfgang Fortner, Sofia Gubaidulina, Hans Werner Henze, Volker David Kirchner, Detlev Müller-Siemens, Dieter Schnebel and Manfred Trojahn.

== Life and career ==
Bernhard Klee was born in Schleiz, Thuringia, on 19 April 1936 and grew up in Jena. Klee learned to play the piano, violin, and double bass. He was a member of the Leipzig Thomanerchor from 1948 to 1955, under Günther Ramin, eventually serving as prefect. At the age of ten, he heard his first Mozart opera (Le nozze di Figaro), which would shape him profoundly. After completing his Abitur in 1955 at the Thomasschule zu Leipzig, he studied at the State Academy of Music in Cologne, where his teachers included Günter Wand for conducting, Else Schmitz-Gohr for piano, and Maurits Frank for chamber music. He later emphasized that Fritz Schieri especially influenced his conducting technique. Wand was a role model for him as a conductor focused on the composition.

=== Early career ===
In 1957, Klee began his career as a répétiteur at the Cologne Opera, where Otto Ackermann was Generalmusikdirektor (GMD). In 1958, he moved to the Stadttheater Bern. When Wolfgang Sawallisch was GMD in Cologne, he appointed Klee as his assistant. Klee made his conducting debut in 1960 with Mozart's Die Zauberflöte; the soloists at the time included Elisabeth Grümmer, Edith Mathis, Fritz Wunderlich, and Franz Crass. He then held his first positions as Kapellmeister at the Landestheater Salzburg (1962/63), Theater Oberhausen (1963–1965), and Staatsoper Hannover (1965/66).

=== Lübeck ===
From 1966 to 1973, he held his first leading position as GMD at the Theater Lübeck, succeeding Gerd Albrecht. According to Klaus Matthias, who described him as "a gifted Mozart conductor," Klee devoted himself to the music of Haydn and Mozart, as well as Beethoven and Brahms. He also continued the biennial Bruckner tradition, revisited the symphonies of Mahler and programmed a Sibelius cycle. Matthias noted that Klee "particularly honored Lübeck's historically rooted orientation toward Scandinavia." Klee also performed works by other Romantic composers and representatives of classical modernism, such as Igor Stravinsky, Béla Bartók, and Dmitri Shostakovich. He also played the previously neglected Baroque and pre-Classical composers, which Matthias attributed to Klee's time with the Thomanerchor. Klee's wife, the renowned soprano Edith Mathis, frequently performed in concerts. From 1967, Klee introduced pre-concert talks and later program notes for modern works by Karl Amadeus Hartmann and Wolfgang Fortner. His concert series Musik der Zeit (Music of the time) showcased "avant-garde attempts that were rejected by the audience and not sustained." He also advocated for children's concerts. In 1973, he stepped down from his duties in Lübeck "with courageous intellectual independence ahead of schedule".

=== Guest conducting and international breakthrough ===
In 1968 Klee made his debut with the Berlin Philharmonic Orchestra, with which he would repeatedly perform during the tenures of Karajan and Abbado. After his debut in 1979 with the Berlin Radio Symphony Orchestra, he became a regular guest at its symphony concerts in the Berliner Philharmonie and the Haus des Rundfunks during the 1980s.

A guest performance by the Hamburg State Opera took him to the Edinburgh Festival in Scotland in 1969 with Wagner's The Flying Dutchman. In 1971/72, he was a guest conductor with the BBC Symphony Orchestra in London, where he collaborated with Pierre Boulez. At the Proms in London's Royal Albert Hall during the 1970s, he conducted not only the BBC Symphony Orchestra (1972) but also the London Symphony Orchestra (LSO / 1973, 1975). In an interview, he stated that of the three London orchestras he regularly worked with, he felt particularly connected to the LSO. He made his debut at the Royal Opera House in London in 1972 with Mozart's Così fan tutte.

In 1973, he first appeared at the Salzburg Festival, where he performed Mozart symphonies, arias and a piano concerto with the Mozarteum Orchestra, bassist Robert Kerns and pianist Alexander Jenner (piano). Further appearances there included three performances of Jean-Pierre Ponnelle's production of Le nozze di Figaro 1979 with the Vienna Philharmonic. In 1975, he first conducted at the Wiener Musikverein, where he subsequently conducted the Vienna Symphony and the Royal Stockholm Philharmonic Orchestra.

Klee first conducted in Munich in the 1973/74 season, works by Hartmann and Hans Werner Henze in a musica viva concert. Karl Heinz Ruppel praised him in the Süddeutsche Zeitung for his precise conducting. Further performances with the Bavarian Radio Symphony Orchestra followed, including at the Mozart Festival Würzburg. Joachim Kaiser was impressed by Klee's performance at a concert at the Herkulessaal in 1976, which "established him as a conductor of distinction." During the interim period between Rudolf Kempe and Sergiu Celibidache, Klee was one of the guest conductors with the Munich Philharmonic. At his first Munich Opera Festival in 1979, he conducted the premiere of Mozart's La finta giardiniera at the Cuvilliés Theatre, directed by Ferruccio Soleri.

When Daniel Barenboim withdrew from his commitment to the New York Philharmonic in the 1973/74 season due to an orchestra strike, Klee stepped in, making his debut in the United States at Avery Fisher Hall. Harold C. Schonberg from the New York Times described his performance of works by Weber, Hartmann, and Mahler as solid but lacking inspiration. Subsequently, Klee was invited to conduct other major U.S. orchestras, including the Big Five. He was a frequent guest with the Pittsburgh Symphony Orchestra at Heinz Hall in the 1990s. In 1992, he made his debut with the Dutch Concertgebouw Orchestra, performing works by Mozart, Schumann, and Dvořák. For Wolf-Eberhard von Lewinski (1976), Klee was "an equally musical and intelligent conductor, a precise craftsman, and a sovereign interpreter."

=== Hannover, Düsseldorf, Ludwigshafen ===
Following the death of Willy Steiner, Klee served as chief conductor of the Radiophilharmonie Hannover from 1976 to 1979, and again from 1991 to 1995. According to Günter Katzenberger, he provided the orchestra with "decisive artistic impulses that led to its high reputation and made it known beyond the region." While still active in Hannover, Klee led the Düsseldorf Symphony Orchestra from 1977 to 1987, succeeding Willem van Otterloo. He placed a particular emphasis on the Second Viennese School, already in his inaugural concert. He conducted local premieres of music by Ravel, Stravinsky, Bartók, and Busoni. He also incorporated music by Olivier Messiaen, Karol Szymanowski, and Henryk Czyż. During his tenure the orchestra was enlarged from 90 players to 130. He planned concert programs carefully, sometimes combining seemingly incompatible pieces, with courage and instinct. The Düsseldorfer Musikverein choir was highly challenged by performances of contemporary music. Highlights included the performance of Denisov's Requiem in 1985, in the presence of the composer and Soviet ambassador Vladimir Semyonov, as well as Messiaen's La Transfiguration de Notre Seigneur Jésus-Christ. Klee also conducted works by Alexander Scriabin and Franz Schreker, as well as composers from the second half of the 20th century, including Boulez, Ligeti, Maderna, and Penderecki. Contemporary compositions by Baird, Henze, and Kotoński were also performed. Composers such as Witold Lutosławski, Heinz Holliger, and Hans Zender conducted their own works in Düsseldorf during Klee's tenure. Klee also championed Düsseldorf composers such as Günther Becker, Oskar Gottlieb Blarr, and Jürg Baur. He initiated a program for composers in their 20s to collaborate with the orchestra, giving each a residence of a week of watching rehearsals, speak with the musicians and try things out. Together with the choir of the Musikverein choir, Klee recorded for EMI Schumann's Scenes from Goethe's Faust, Requiem, Requiem for Mignon, and orchestral-choral ballads. In 1984, he led the choir and orchestra on a highly acclaimed guest tour to the Wratislavia Cantans festival in Wrocław, Poland. On the program were Mozart's Requiem, Schoenberg's A Survivor from Warsaw and then a repeat of the Requiem until the point where Mozart ended because he died; the program was regarded as an expression of reconciliation.

When the "new" Tonhalle Düsseldorf was opened in 1978 after restoration, he also programmed chamber music works there, unprecedented since Heinrich Hollreiser. He established a second repeat of symphony concerts on Sunday mornings. Music critic Hans Winking (1985) considered him one of the "most distinguished German conductors," who had made significant contributions to contemporary music in Düsseldorf.

During his Düsseldorf years, Klee became the principal guest conductor of the BBC Philharmonic Orchestra in Manchester from 1985 to 1989. He performed regularly with them at the Proms. His final Proms concert was in 1991. After Franz Welser-Möst did not assume his post in 1991, Klee initially became interim chief conductor of the Rhine-Palatinate State Philharmonic in Ludwigshafen in 1992.

=== Guest conducting in Halle ===
After his initial engagement as guest conductor of the Philharmonisches Staatsorchester Halle in 1997, Klee was designated to succeed Heribert Beissel as GMD. He assumed a formal guest conducting role in 1998. According to Johannes Killyen, Klee "transformed the orchestra into a top ensemble within a few months," but was frustrated by the city of Halle's "mismanagement in the administration and failure to meet certain contractual conditions", which led to Wolf-Dieter Hauschild becoming chief conductor.

=== Personal life ===
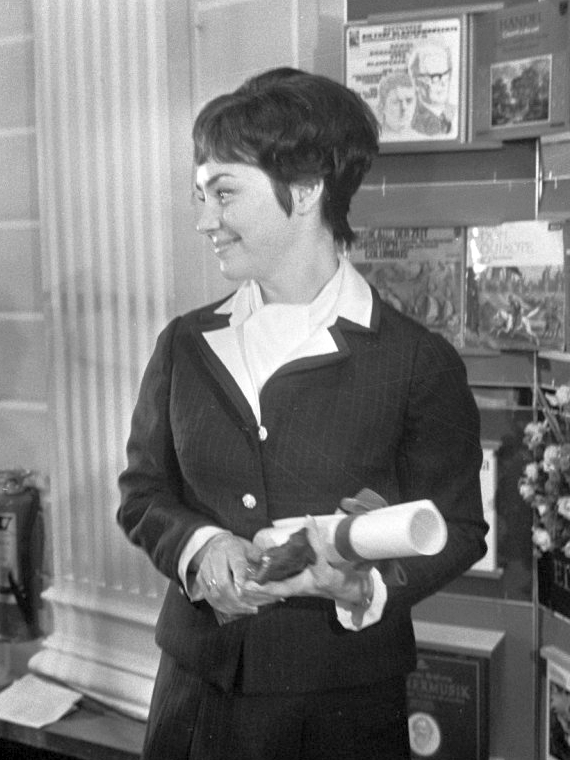
Edith Mathis (1969)

Bernhard Klee settled in Switzerland with his first wife, the Swiss soprano Edith Mathis. He frequently performed as her accompanist for Lieder; a joint recording earned the Deutscher Schallplattenpreis in 1973. Their marriage ended in divorce. Klee's second wife Yvonne was a Swiss psychologist. He last lived in Wagerswil and Kreuzlingen in the Canton of Thurgau.

Klee died in Kreuzlingen on 10 October 2025, at the age of 89.

== Premieres and recordings ==
Klee conducted the Berlin Philharmonic Orchestra in the German premieres of Henze's Second Violin Concerto and Heliogabalus Imperator in 1972. He led several world premieres, including works by Wolfgang Fortner (Triptychon, 1978), Manfred Trojahn (Abschied..., 1978), Detlev Müller-Siemens (Passacaglia, 1979), Hans-Jürgen von Bose (Idyllen, 1983), Henze (Ode an eine Äolsharfe, at the Lucerne Festival 1986), Sofia Gubaidulina (Märchenpoem, 1992), Volker David Kirchner (Second Symphony "Mythen", 1992), and Dieter Schnebel (Canones, 1995).

Klee conducted complete opera recordings including Mozart's Zaide (1973), Nicolai's Die lustigen Weiber von Windsor (1976), Lorting's Der Wildschütz (1982), Mendelssohn's Die Hochzeit des Camacho (1988), and Mozart's La clemenza di Tito (1989). The Nicolai recording is considered a reference recording. Furthermore, according to Albrecht Dümling, Klee is regarded as "one of the most knowledgeable pioneers of the Zemlinsky renaissance."

== Awards ==
Honours

- 1995: Honorary conductor of the Radiophilharmonie Hannover

Record Awards

- 1973: Deutscher Schallplattenpreis (Vocal Recital) for Mozart Lieder with Mathis – pianist
- 1975: Wiener Flötenuhr for Mozart's Thamos, King of Egypt – conductor
- 1976: Wiener Flötenuhr for Mozart's Zaide – conductor
- 1984: Preis der deutschen Schallplattenkritik, quarterly list 2/1984 for Schumann's Requiem and other works – conductor
- 2004: Gramophone Editor's Choice; R 10 Classica; Le Timbre de Platine, for Mozart's La clemenza di Tito, live recording from the Bavarian State Opera – conductor

== Selected discography ==
Pianist

- 1973: Mozart: Lieder with Edith Mathis. Deutsche Grammophon, Hamburg. OCLC 310820129
- 1976: Mozart: Lieder with Hermann Prey. Deutsche Grammophon, Hamburg. OCLC 310820129

Conductor

- 1970: Beethoven: The Creatures of Prometheus. Berlin Philharmonic (Deutsche Grammophon) OCLC 1116899934
- 1970: Beethoven: The Ruins of Athens and others. Berlin Philharmonic, RIAS Kammerchor; Soloists: Arleen Augér, Franz Crass, Klaus Hirte (Deutsche Grammophon) OCLC 1115708313
- 1970: Beethoven: Christ on the Mount of Olives. Vienna Symphony, Vienna Singverein; Soloists: Elizabeth Harwood, James King, Franz Crass (Deutsche Grammophon) OCLC 237045321
- 1974: Mozart: Flute Concerto Nos. 1 and 2; Andante for Flute and Orchestra, English Chamber Orchestra and Karlheinz Zöller. Deutsche Grammophon, Hamburg 2530 344. OCLC 313157832
- 1974: Mozart: Thamos, King of Egypt, Staatskapelle Berlin, Berliner Solistenvereinigung; Soloists: Karin Eickstaedt, Gisela Pohl, Eberhard Büchner, Theo Adam, Hermann Christian Polster (Philips Records) OCLC 954343086
- 1975: Mozart: Zaide, Berlin State Orchestra; Soloists: Edith Mathis, Peter Schreier, Ingvar Wixell, Werner Hollweg, Reiner Süß (Philips) OCLC 24987154
- 1975: Haydn: Symphonies No. 6, 7, 8, Prague Chamber Orchestra; Soloists: Petr Škvor, Oldřich Vlček, Bohumil Bayer, František Pošta (Deutsche Grammophon) OCLC 2672048
- 1976: Nicolai: Die lustigen Weiber von Windsor, Staatskapelle Berlin; Soloists: Helen Donath, Edith Mathis, Hanna Schwarz, Kurt Moll, Peter Schreier, Siegfried Vogel, Bernd Weikl. Deutsche Grammophon. OCLC 884873458
- 1979: Mozart: Coronation Mass; Sparrow Mass; Exsultate, jubilate; Ave verum corpus. Soloists: Edith Mathis, soprano, and others, Hans Otto, organ, Bavarian Radio Choir, Regensburger Domspatzen, Staatskapelle Dresden, Bavarian Radio Symphony Orchestra. Hamburg, Deutsche Grammophon/Galleria 419 060-1 (partly originally Berlin/DDR, VEB Deutsche Schallplatten, Eterna 1973) OCLC 36024677
- 1981: Zemlinsky: Lyric Symphony, Berlin Radio Symphony Orchestra; Soloists: Elisabeth Söderström, Dale Duesing (Schwann Musica Mundi) OCLC 960412120
- 1982: Zemlinsky: Six Songs, Berlin Radio Symphony Orchestra; Soloists: Glenys Linos (Schwann Musica Mundi) OCLC 960412120
- 1982: Mozart: Piano Concertos Nos. 21/22, Bavarian Radio Symphony Orchestra; Soloist: Wilhelm Kempff (Deutsche Grammophon) OCLC 802455849
- 1980–1982: Lortzing: Der Wildschütz. Staatskapelle Berlin, Berlin Radio Choir, Berlin Radio Children's Choir; Soloists: Hans Sotin, Georgine Resick, Peter Schreier, Edith Mathis, Gottfried Hornik, Doris Soffel (LPs: Eterna 1984 > CDs: Brilliant Classics 94701, 2014) OCLC 889966945
- 1982: Schumann: Scenes from Goethe's Faust. Düsseldorf Symphony Orchestra, Tölz Boys' Choir, Düsseldorf Municipal Music Association Choir; Soloists: Edith Mathis, Nicolai Gedda, Dietrich Fischer-Dieskau, Walter Berry (EMI Classics) OCLC 1223267208
- 1984: Schumann: Requiem; Requiem for Mignon; Soloists: Helen Donath, Doris Soffel, Nicolai Gedda, Dietrich Fischer-Dieskau, and others, Düsseldorf Symphony Orchestra ([EMI Classics 1C 067/1467561]): Op. 148 also (EMI Classics 7243 5 65830 2 3) (1996) OCLC 11862633
- 1986: Schumann: Complete Ballads. Düsseldorf Symphony Orchestra, Düsseldorfer Musikverein; Soloists: Walton Grönroos, Peter Meven, Walter Berry, Doris Soffel, Ilse Gramatzki, Brigitte Lindner, Josef Protschka, and others (EMI Classics) OCLC 33972722
- 1992: Bruckner: Ninth Symphony. BBC Philharmonic Orchestra (BBC Classics) OCLC 154159439
- 1993: Bruno Maderna: Grande Aulodia and others. Southwest Radio Symphony Orchestra; Soloists: Han de Vries, Roberto Fabbriciani (BVHaast) OCLC 785997554
- 1994: Sofia Gubaidulina: Piano Music. Hannover Radio Philharmonic of the NDR; Soloist: Andreas Haefliger (Sony Classical) OCLC 874527682
- 1994: Sofia Gubaidulina: Märchenbild and others. Hannover Radio Philharmonic of the NDR (cpo) OCLC 1116272601
- 1995: Killmayer: Hölderlin-Lieder. Hannover Radio Philharmonic of the NDR; Soloists: Peter Schreier, Philipp Jungebluth (WERGO) OCLC 1083862790
- 1996: Mozart: Requiem (Franz Beyer) + Luigi Nono: Canti di vita e d'amore (IPPNW Memorial Concert for the 50th Anniversary of Hiroshima and Nagasaki 1995); Bundesjugendorchester, Riga Academic Choir, Carl von Ossietzky Choir Berlin; Soloists: Barainsky, Kallisch, Randle, Snell (NDR/ARS MUSICI. AMP 5059-2) OCLC 163141775
- 2004: Mozart: La clemenza di Tito and others: Bavarian State Orchestra; Soloist: Julia Varady (Orfeo) OCLC 1020702514

Cultural offices
Preceded by Willy Steiner	Chief Conductor, Radiophilharmonie Hannover; 1976–1979	Succeeded by Zdeněk Mácal
Preceded by Willem van Otterloo	Principal Conductor, Düsseldorf Symphony Orchestra; 1977–1987	Succeeded by David Shallon
Preceded by Aldo Ceccato	Chief Conductor, Radiophilharmonie Hannover; 1991–1995	Succeeded by Eiji Ōue
Preceded by Leif Segerstam	Chief Conductor, Staatsphilharmonie Rheinland-Pfalz; 1992–1997	Succeeded by Theodor Guschlbauer
