= Der Wildschütz =

1842 opera by Albert Lortzing

- Opera by Albert Lortzing
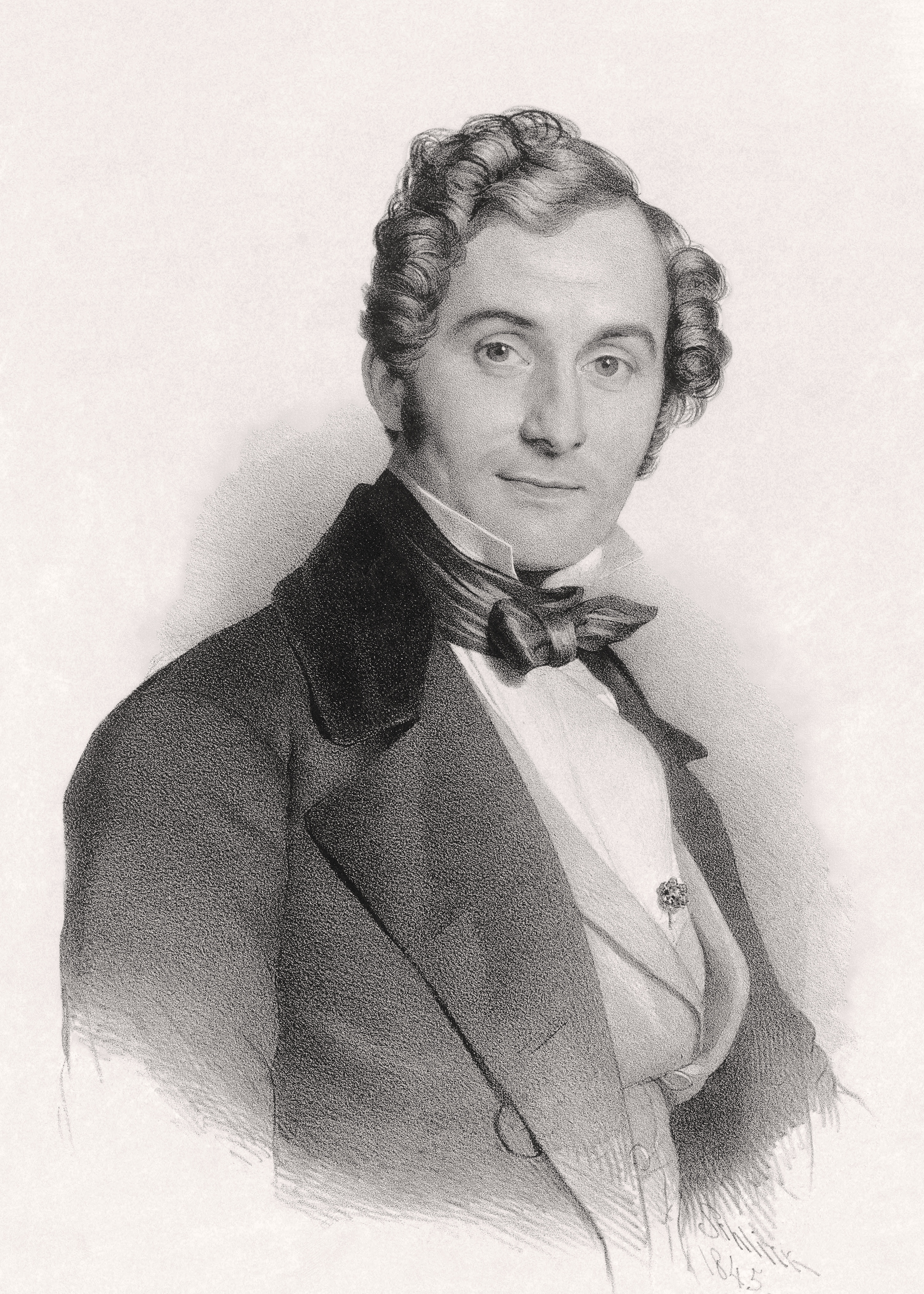
- The composer in 1845
- Translation: The Poacher
- Librettist: Lortzing
- Language: German
- Based on: Der Rehbock by August von Kotzebue
- Premiere: 31 December 1842; Stadttheater, Leipzig

Der Wildschütz oder Die Stimme der Natur (The Poacher, or The Voice of Nature) is a German Komische Oper, or comic opera, in three acts by Albert Lortzing from a libretto by the composer adapted from the comedy Der Rehbock, oder Die schuldlosen Schuldbewussten by August von Kotzebue. It had its premiere at the Stadttheater in Leipzig on 31 December 1842.

== Roles ==
Role	Voice type	Premiere Cast, 31 December 1842 (Conductor: Albert Lortzing)
Count von Eberbach	baritone	August Kindermann
Gräfin (Countess) von Eberbach, his wife	alto	Caroline Düringer-Lange
Baron Kronthal, brother of the Countess	tenor	Heinrich Schmidt
Baronin (Baroness) von Freimann, widow, sister of the Count	soprano	Caroline Günther-Bachmann
Baculus, schoolmaster	bass	Gotthelf Leberecht Berthold
Gretchen, his fiancée	soprano	Auguste Krüger-Aschenbrenner
Pancratius, the Count's major-domo	baritone	Max Ballmann
Nanette, the Baroness's maid	mezzo-soprano	Tanz

== Synopsis ==
=== Act 1 ===
At the village hotel, the schoolmaster Baculus is celebrating his engagement to Gretchen. A hunter from the Count von Eberbach then arrives at the festivities with a letter telling Baculus that he has been dismissed from his schoolmaster post, as Baculus had earlier gone hunting on the count's land without his permission. Baculus thinks to send Gretchen to change the count's mind, but then recalls the count's weakness for young women. The Baroness von Freimann, sister of the count and recently widowed, arrives disguised as a student to travel incognito. Her brother wants her to remarry with Baron Kronthal. The Baroness hears of Baculus's misfortune, and offers herself to plead his case in place of Gretchen. The Count then comes on the scene with his shooting party, as does Baron Kronthal. Both the Count and the baron are immediately attracted to Gretchen. The entire party is then gathered for the count's birthday celebration at his castle.

=== Act 2 ===
The Countess von Eberbach has a weakness for ancient tragedies, particularly Sophocles, and she bores her servant when she expounds on them. Pancratius, the house master, advises Baculus to exploit this feature to gain favour with the countess. Baculus impresses the countess with quotations from these ancient literary works. However, the Count sees this and tries to banish Baculus from the proceedings. Baculus then tries to enlist the Baroness with the idea of her appearing as Gretchen, in disguise. A storm then arises, and this forces Baculus and Gretchen to remain locked in the castle. During a billiards party, the lights suddenly go out. The Count and the Baron take the opportunity to surprise Gretchen. However, the Countess helps Baculus and Gretchen to escape. The baron then offers a reward of 5000 Taler for delivering Gretchen to him.

=== Act 3 ===
The Count's birthday celebration is continuing. The "correct" Gretchen is now brought to the castle. The Baron notices that Gretchen seems different from before. Baculus then reveals that the "previous" Gretchen was a student in disguise. After Baculus is pressed further, the Baroness reveals her true identity. The Baron demands an explanation from Baculus, and later the Count adds his voice to ask for clarification. The countess eventually arrives as well. The confusion is finally clarified. In the end, Baculus and Gretchen are reunited, and Baculus is restored to his schoolmaster position. It also turns out that Baculus had accidentally shot his own donkey initially, rather than a deer on the count's grounds.

== Complete recordings ==
key: conductor/baronin/gretchen/gräfin/kronthal/eberbach/baculus

- Hans Müller-Kray/Wissmann/Nentwig/Münch/Fehringer/Rehfuss/Kurt Böhme - 1954, Süddeutscher Rundfunk
- Wallberg/Seefried/Holm/Rössl-Majdan/Kmentt/Völker/Dönch - 1960, live in Vienna, Orfeo
- Robert Heger/Anneliese Rothenberger/Lotte Schädle/Litz/Fritz Wunderlich/Hermann Prey/Fritz Ollendorff, Bavarian State Orchestra - 1963, EMI CMS 7 63205 2, reed. 0946-3-81837-2-3
- Bernhard Klee/Edith Mathis/Georgine Resick/Doris Soffel/Peter Schreier/Gottfried Hornik/Hans Sotin, Staatskapelle Berlin - 1982, Deutsche Grammophon 2740-271
- Eschwé/Dorn/Ullrich/Brohm/Davislim/Roth/Zeppenfeld - 2015, live in Dresden
