= Op. 148 =

In music, Op. 148 stands for Opus number 148. Compositions that are assigned this number include:

- Rheinberger – Organ Sonata No. 11
- Schubert – Notturno
- Schumann – Requiem
