= Elizabeth Norberg-Schulz =

Norwegian-Italian operatic soprano

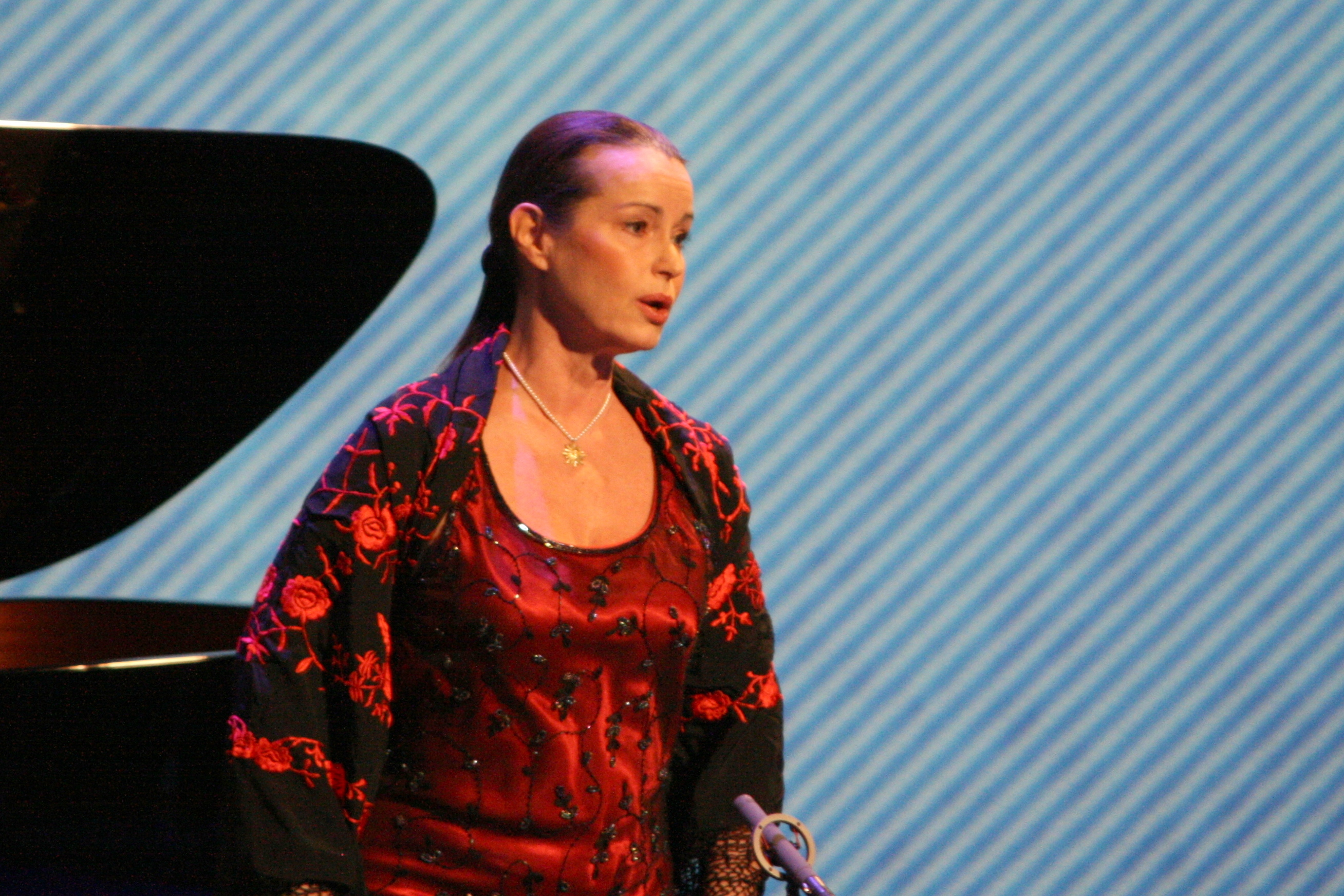
- Born: 27 January 1959 (age 67); Oslo, Norway
- Education: Conservatorio Santa Cecilia
- Occupations: Operatic soprano; voice teacher
- Father: Christian Norberg-Schulz

Elizabeth Norberg-Schulz (born 27 January 1959) is a Norwegian-Italian operatic soprano.

== Early life and education ==
Elizabeth Norberg-Schulz is the daughter of Norwegian architectural theorist Christian Norberg-Schulz, and Italian translator and writer Anna Maria de Dominicis. She grew up in Ris, Oslo. When she was young she took lessons in voice with Anne Brown, as well as lessons in piano, ballet and theatre.

She started studies at the Conservatorio Santa Cecilia in Rome in 1974, first piano and from 1974 in voice with Rosina Vedrani Laporta, with whom she studied for ten years. She got a diploma in piano in 1978 and in voice in 1982.

She has also studied with John Shirley-Quirk, Peter Pears, and for a number of years with Elisabeth Schwarzkopf.

== Career ==
She has performed in many of the world's leading opera houses and companies, including La Scala, Teatro dell'Opera di Roma, Teatro Comunale di Bologna, Teatro Massimo di Palermo, Teatro Regio di Torino, Teatro San Carlo in Naples, Teatro Carlo Felice in Genoa, La Fenice in Venice, the New York Metropolitan Opera, the Lyric Opera of Chicago, Royal Opera, Covent Garden, Opéra Bastille, La Monnaie in Brussels, Teatro Real in Madrid, Opéra de Genève, Bavarian State Opera in Munich, Vienna State Opera and the Norwegian National Opera.

Since 2006 she has been professor in voice and interpretation at the University of Stavanger in Norway.

== Personal life ==
Norberg-Schulz is married to Italian conductor Vittorio Bonolis. The couple have one son.

== Opera roles ==
Her principal roles include (in alphabetical order):

- Adele – Die Fledermaus (Johann Strauss II): Metropolitan Opera (New York)
- Adina – Adina (Rossini): La Scala (Milan), Rome, Naples, Vienna State Opera
- Asteria – Tamerlano (Handel): Florence, Halle, London, Théâtre des Champs-Élysées (Paris)
- Constance – Dialogues des Carmélites (Dialogues of the Carmelites) (Poulenc): La Scala
- Gilda – Rigoletto (Verdi): Vienna, Spoleto, Palermo, Treviso, Oslo
- Gretel – Hänsel und Gretel (Hansel and Gretel) (Humperdinck): Chicago
- Liù – Turandot (Puccini): Covent Garden, Athens, Bologna
- Lucia – Lucia di Lammermoor (Donizetti): Vienna State Opera, Spoleto, Oslo
- Manon Lescaut – Manon (Massenet): Vienna State Opera
- Micaëla – Carmen (Bizet): Opéra Bastille (Paris), Rome, Oslo
- Mimì – La bohème (Puccini): Glyndebourne Festival, Oslo
- Musetta – La bohème (Puccini): Florence, Vienna State Opera
- Nannetta – Falstaff (Verdi): La Scala, Salzburg, Vienna State Opera, Madrid
- Norina – Don Pasquale (Donizetti): Munich, Hamburg, Macerata, Naples
- Oscar – Un ballo in maschera (Verdi): Metropolitan Opera, Chicago, Vienna State Opera, Oslo
- Pamina – Die Zauberflöte (The Magic Flute) (Mozart): Chicago, Madrid, Salzburg Festival, Vienna State Opera, Bologna
- Susanna – Le nozze di Figaro (The Marriage of Figaro) (Mozart): La Scala, Vienna
- Zerlina – Don Giovanni (Mozart): Rome, Naples, Vienna
- Romilda – Serse (Handel): Florence, Halle, London, Les Arts Florissants (ensemble)

Her festival appearances include the Rossini Opera Festival of Pesaro, where she has sung Corinna (Il viaggio a Reims, Rossini), Anaïs (Anaï) (Mosè in Egitto, Moses in Egypt, Rossini), Jemmy (Guglielmo Tell, William Tell, Rossini) and Giulia (La scala di seta, The Silken Ladder, Rossini). They also include Salzburg, Montreux, Spoleto, Macerata, the Beethoven Festival (de) in Bonn, and the Handel Festival, Halle.

== Concert repertoire ==
Her concert appearances have included (in alphabetical order of orchestras, and conductors):

- Bavarian Radio Symphony Orchestra. With Sir Colin Davis): Mahler, Symphony No. 8
- Bergen Philharmonic Orchestra. With Aldo Ceccato: Mahler, Symphony No. 4; Berg, Sieben frühe Lieder; de Falla, Atlántida; Brahms, A German Requiem
- Berlin Philharmonic. With Claudio Abbado: Schumann, Requiem for Mignon; Brahms, A German Requiem
- Boston Symphony Orchestra. With Seiji Ozawa: Ravel, L'enfant et les sortilèges
- Chicago Symphony Orchestra. With Sir Georg Solti: Haydn, The Creation
- Dresden Staatskapelle. With Giuseppe Sinopoli: Beethoven, Symphony No. 9; Richard Strauss, Four Last Songs; Mozart, Requiem
- Filarmonica della Scala. With Valery Gergiev: Mozart, Requiem
  - With Riccardo Muti: Mozart, Requiem
- Munich Philharmonic. With Claudio Abbado: Pergolesi, Salve Regina. With Marcello Viotti: Lili Boulanger, Clairières dans le ciel
- New York Philharmonic. With Kurt Masur: Debussy, Le Martyre de saint Sébastien
- Orchestre de Paris. With Semyon Bychkov: Mahler, Symphony No. 2; Beethoven, Symphony No. 9
- Oslo Philharmonic. With Mariss Jansons: opera recital
  - With Giuseppe Sinopoli: Mahler, Symphony No. 4
- RAI National Symphony Orchestra. With Jeffrey Tate: Mahler, Symphony No. 2; Mahler, Symphony No. 4; Berg, "Der Wein"
- San Francisco Symphony. With Herbert Blomstedt: Brahms, A German Requiem
- Vienna Philharmonic. With Claudio Abbado: Brahms, A German Requiem
  - With Sir Georg Solti: Mozart, Great Mass in C minor, K. 427

== Awards ==
Early in her career she won the Salzburg "Mozart Wettbewerb" and the Spoleto "Sperimentale" prizes, and in 1993, she was awarded the Grieg Prize by the Grieg Academy in Oslo. She has also received the "Minerva Prize" (2004) and the "Verdi Prize" (2006). In 2004, King Harald V of Norway, made her a Knight of the Order of St. Olav, and in 2006, the Italian President Giorgio Napolitano made her a "Commander of the Italian Republic".

== Recordings ==
Norberg-Schulz's recordings for Philips, Decca, EMI, Ricordi and BMG include Mozart's Mass in C minor, Verdi's Falstaff with Solti (Nanetta), Brahms' Ein deutsches Requiem with Blomstedt (Grammy Award), Mahler's Symphony Number 8 with Sir Colin Davis, and Tamerlano with Trevor Pinnock (Asteria). She has also recorded a recital disc of songs by Edvard Grieg with the pianist Håvard Gims which received the Grieg Award.
