= Glenys Linos =

British-Greek operatic mezzo-soprano (1937–2020)

- Glenys Linos, in the 1960s
- Born: Glenys Birch; 30 January 2020; Cairo, Egypt
- Died: 30 January 2020 (aged 82); Vienna, Austria
- Other names: Glenys Loulis; Glenys Linos-Persché
- Occupation: Operatic mezzo-soprano
- Spouse: Gerhard Persché

Glenys Linos (born Glenys Birch; 29 September 1937 – 30 January 2020) was a British operatic mezzo-soprano. She appeared under the name Glenys Loulis until 1974. She performed widely across Europe from the 1960s to the early 1990s, appearing at major opera houses including the Opernhaus Zürich, Bayerische Staatsoper, Opéra de Paris, Royal Opera House, and La Scala.

== Life and career ==
Glenys Birch was born in Cairo on 29 September 1937 to a British father and Greek mother. She grew up in the United Kingdom and then studied music at the Athens Conservatoire, first playing horn and then turning to voice. She continued vocal studies privately with Elvira de Hidalgo in Milan and with later Dennis Hall in Bern. She made her debut at the Athens Festival as Emilia in Verdi's Otello.

She began her professional career in Germany, with engagements at the Stadttheater Mainz (1958–69), Theater Ulm (1969–73), and Staatstheater Wiesbaden (1973–77). Until 1974, she performed under the name Glenys Loulis, including at the 1971 Bayreuth Festival as Schwertleite in Wagner's Die Walküre. She appeared as a guest at the Opéra de Monte-Carlo as Annina in Der Rosenkavalier by R. Strauss the same year. She portrayed the title role of Bizet's Carmen at the Théâtre du Capitole in Toulouse in 1973.

In 1977 Linos became a member of the ensemble of the Opernhaus Zürich, remaining until 1982 and appearing regularly as a guest artist thereafter. She performed there in the Monteverdi cycle directed by Jean-Pierre Ponnelle and conducted by Nikolaus Harnoncourt, in 1978 as Messagera in L’Orfeo and as Ottavia in L’incoronazione di Poppea. In 1979 she portrayed the Countess Geschwitz in the Swiss premiere of Alban Berg's Lulu in the version completed by Friedrich Cerha, directed by Götz Friedrich and conducted by Ferdinand Leitner. Roles in Zürich included the Carmen, Auntie in Brittens Peter Grimes, Charlotte in Massenet's Werther in 1979, with Peter Dvorský in the title role, Giulietta in Offenbachs Les contes d'Hoffmann in 1980, the title role in Der Rosenkavalier, Maddalena in Verdis Rigoletto, Brangäne in Wagner's Tristan und Isolde in 1980 for the Zürich June Festival and the title role in Othmar Schoeck's Penthesilea in 1984.

She performed at the Theater Basel in 1979 as Fricka in Wagner's Das Rheingold and Die Walküre, and in 1988 as Mrs. Quickly in Verdi's Falstaff. She appeared at the Theater St. Gallen in 1980 as Orfeo in Gluck's Orfeo ed Euridice, at the Theater Bern as Santuzza in Mascagni's Cavalleria rusticana in 1982, and at the Lausanne Opera as Schoeck's Penthesilea and the Sorceress in Purcells Dido and Aeneas in 1886.

Beyond Switzerland, she returned to Wiesbaden in 1979 to portray Adriano in Wagner's Rienzi, conducted by Siegfried Köhler, in a production that was recorded on video and broadcast several times. She appeared in several roles by Richard Strauss, as the Nurse in Die Frau ohne Schatten at the Deutsche Oper am Rhein and the Bavarian State Opera as part of the Munich Opera Festival in 1978 as Clairon in Capriccio in Bologna in 1987, as Herodias in Salome in Genova and as Klytämnestra in Elektra at the Spoleto Festival in 1990. She performed Verdi roles, Amneris in Aida at the Staatsoper Hannover and Staatstheater Karlsruhe, Preziosilla in La forza del destino in Nizza in 1984, Azucena in Il trovatore and Ulrica in Un ballo in maschera at the Staatsoper Stuttgart.

Linos portrayed Countess Geschwitz also at the Liceu in Barcelona and the Royal Opera House in London, and appeared as Baba the Turk in Strawinsky's The Rake's Progress at the Maggio Musicale Fiorentino and the Cologne Opera. She appeared at the Salzburg Festival as Storgè in a scenic production of Handel's oratorio Jephtha from 1984 to 1986, in 1985 at the Grand Théâtre de Genève as Lucretia in Britten's The Rape of Lucretia, at the Opéra-Comique as Laura in Dargomyzhsky’s The Stone Guest and at the Oper Frankfurt as Dido in Purcell's Dido and Aeneas. She performed at La Scala in Milan as Geneviève in Debussy's Pelléas et Mélisande in 1986, conducted by Claudio Abbado. In 1986 she also performed as Ermengarde in Spontini's Agnese di Hohenstaufen in Rome.

She portrayed Carmen frequently, including at the Theater Bern in 1979, Opéra de Paris (Palais des Sports), Bavarian State Opera in Munich and the Deutsche Oper Berlin.

Her concert repertoire extended from Baroque works to Mahler's Das Lied von der Erde. She performed the alto solo in Verdi's Requiem at the Royal Festival Hall in London in 1983. She appeared as soloist with the Tonhalle-Orchester Zürich, Staatsphilharmonie Rheinland-Pfalz, and the Essen Philharmonic.

Linos retired from the stage in 1992 after her final performances as Leokadja Begbick in Weill's Rise and Fall of the City of Mahagonny in Frankfurt. After her performing career, Linos taught singing in Zürich, at the Royal Academy of Music in London, and from 2002 in Vienna, where she lived until her death.

Linos was married to the Austrian dramaturge and musicologist Gerhard Persché.

Linos died in Vienna on 30 January 2020, at the age of 82.

== Recordings ==
- Mahler: Symphony No. 2, with Rosalind Plowright, Chor der St. Hedwigs-Kathedrale Berlin, conducted by Bernhard Klee, Altus, 1982
- Pelléas et Mélisande – Geneviève; conducted by Claudio Abbado, Teatro alla Scala, 1986 (live recording, later released on CD)
- Andrea Chénier – Madelon; live from Alte Oper Frankfurt, 1990 (CD release)
