= Jerusalem Symphony Orchestra =

Israeli orchestra

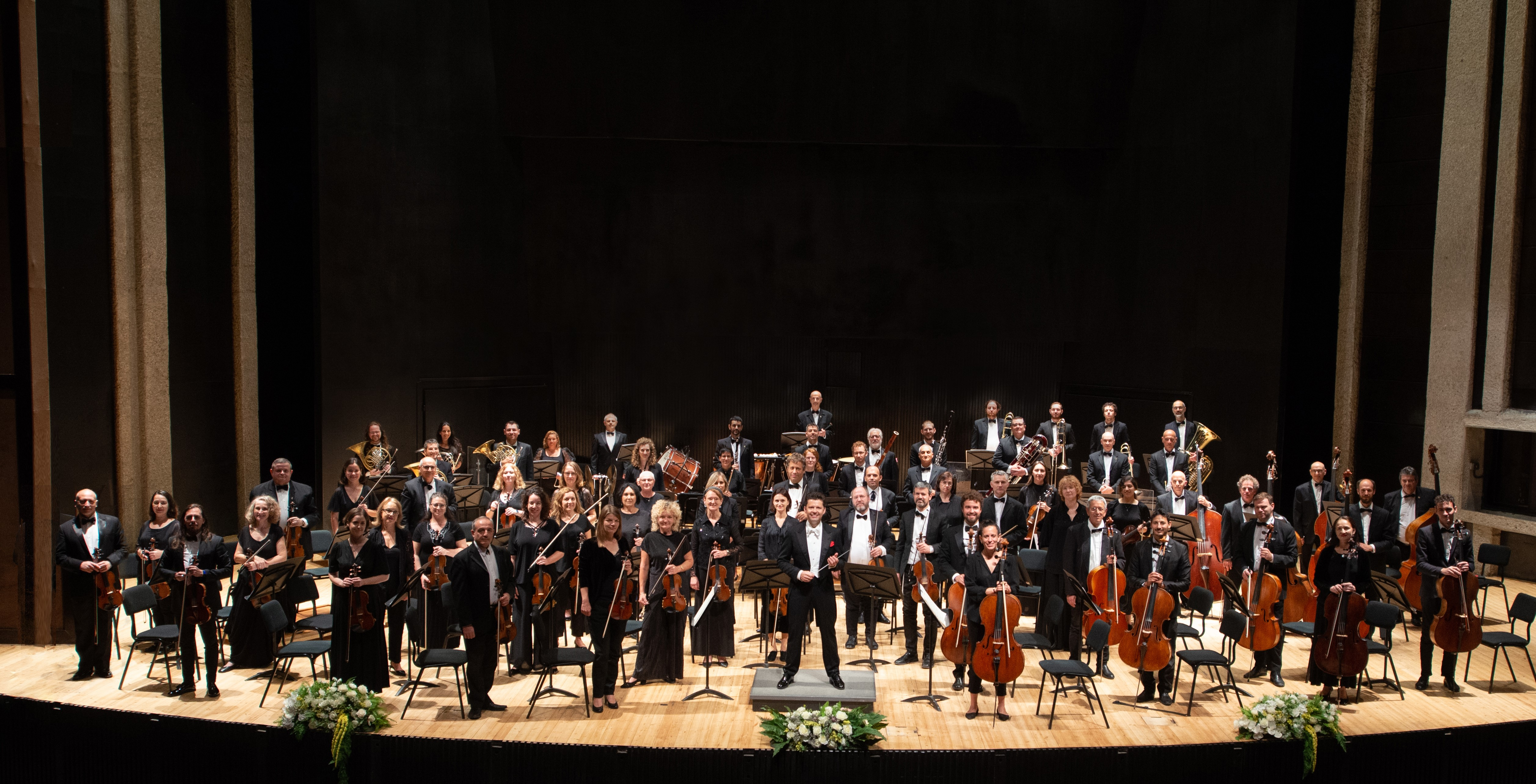
Jerusalem Symphony Orchestra

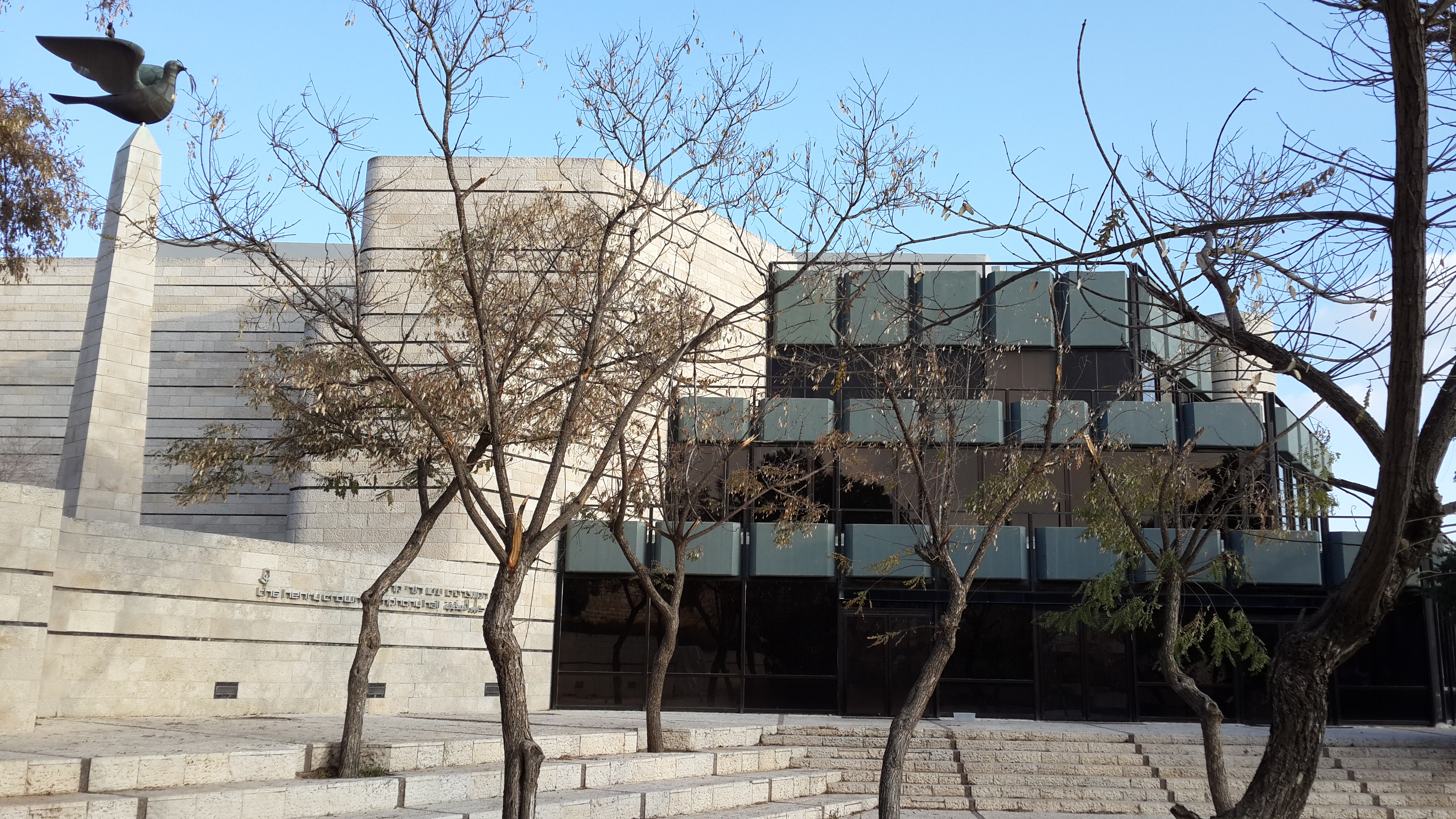
Henry Crown Symphony Hall home of the orchestra

The Jerusalem Symphony Orchestra (Hebrew: התזמורת הסימפונית ירושלים, ha-Tizmoret ha-Simfonit Yerushalayim) is a major orchestra of Israel. Since the 1980s, the JSO has been based in the Henry Crown Symphony Hall, part of the Jerusalem Theater complex.

== History ==
The Jerusalem Symphony Orchestra, was founded as the Palestine Broadcasting Service Orchestra in the late 1930s. In 1948 it became the national radio orchestra and was known as the “Kol Israel Orchestra”. In the 1970s, the orchestra was expanded into the Jerusalem Symphony Orchestra, Israel Broadcasting Authority. As a radio symphony orchestra, the majority of the concerts which the orchestra holds at its resident hall – the Henry Crown Auditorium – are being recorded and broadcast over Kan Kol Ha’musika station.

The current Music Director of the JSO is Maestro Dmitry Yablonsky. The orchestra has had eight musical directors hitherto: Mendi Rodan, Lukas Foss, Gary Bertini, Lawrence Foster, David Shallon, Leon Botstein, Frédéric Chaslin, Steven Sloane and Julian Rachlin.

The orchestra maintains a varied repertoire which ranges from the Baroque and the Classical periods through the Romantic period, extending to contemporary composers, many of whom have received their Israeli premières with the JSO. The orchestra was the first Israeli Orchestra to perform the works of renowned composers such as Sofia Gubaidolina, Henry Dutilleux, Alfred Schnittke and others. Since its inception the Jerusalem Symphony Orchestra has consistently encouraged Israeli composers by commissioning and performing their works.

Over the decades, some of the music world’s legendary musicians have performed with the JSO, with performances by Igor Stravinsky, Otto Klemperer, Arthur Rubinstein, Yehudi Menuhin, Mstislav Rostropovich, Isaac Stern, Pablo Casals, Igor Markevitch, Henryk Szeryng, Yo Yo Ma, Pierre Boulez, Neville Mariner, Christa Ludwig, Tabea Zimmermann, Martha Argerich, Radu Lupu, Jose Carreras, Jean Pierre Rampal, Maxim Vengerov and Yefim Bronfman.

Among the most notable premières performed by the orchestra: the opera David by Milhaud (1954); the cantata Abraham and Isaac by Stravinsky, conducted by Robert Craft (1964); and Symphony No. 7 The Seven Gates of Jerusalem by Krzysztof Penderecki conducted by Maestro Lorin Maazel, which was commissioned as the conclusion for the Jerusalem 3000 celebrations.

In the past, the orchestra took particular pride in the Liturgical Festival, founded by Maestro Gary Bertini, which presented music of worship from the three major religions. The festival has now been incorporated into the concert season as a series of vocal and liturgical concerts.

The orchestra performs regularly at the Israel Festival. In 2008 the JSO presented the Israeli première of Das klagende Lied (Mahler) with conductor Uri Segal and the Warsaw Philharmonic Choir.

The JSO often conducts tours in Europe and in the United States, and has played in some of the most prestigious venues, including the Musikvereine in Vienna, the Philharmonie in Cologne and Carnegie Hall in New York. In February 2015 the JSO was invited by UNESCO to Paris to perform Shostakovich’s Symphony No. 13, Babi Yar in a special concert which commemorated the 70th anniversary of the liberation of Auschwitz. Even more recently, in August 2015 the orchestra toured in Brazil with Maestro Chaslin and Israeli soloist Itamar Zorman and in 2016 toured the US and Japan. In June 2009 the orchestra performed the oratorio Elijah (Mendelssohn) at the closing event of the annual Bachfest in Leipzig.

The orchestra is supported by the Ministry of Culture and Sport and the Jerusalem City municipality.

== Musical directors ==
The Jerusalem Symphony has been led by the following musical directors:

- Karel Salmon (1938–1948)
- Mendi Rodan (1963–1972)
- Lukas Foss (1972–1976)
- Gary Bertini (1978–1987)
- Lawrence Foster (1988–1992)
- David Shallon (1992–2000)
- Frédéric Chaslin (1999–2002)
- Leon Botstein (2003–2011)
- Frédéric Chaslin (2011–2019)
- Steven Sloane (2019–2023)
- Julian Rachlin (2023–2026)
- Dmitry Yablonsky (2026–present)

== See also ==
- Israel Philharmonic Orchestra
