= Düsseldorf Symphony Orchestra =

Orchestra based in Düsseldorf, Germany

Coordinates: 51°13′55″N 6°46′22″E

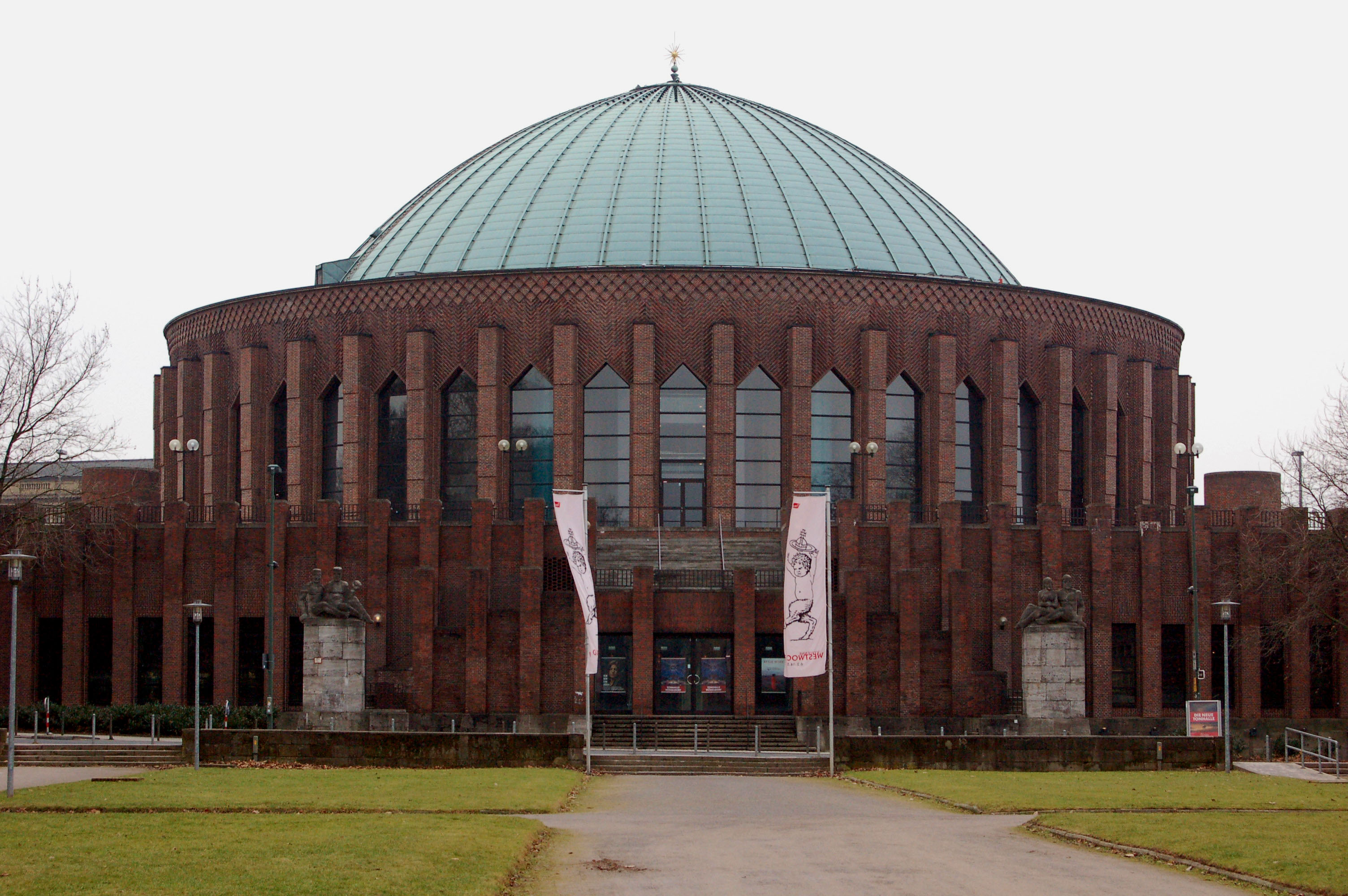
Tonhalle Düsseldorf, the hall of the Düsseldorf Symphony Orchestra

The Düsseldorf Symphony Orchestra (German: Düsseldorfer Symphoniker) is a German orchestra based in Düsseldorf. The second oldest municipal orchestra in Germany, the orchestra is based at the Tonhalle Düsseldorf. In addition to its symphonic concerts, the orchestra serves as one of the two orchestras of the Deutsche Oper am Rhein, alongside the Duisburg Philharmonic.

== History ==
In May 1818, the Municipal Music Association was formed as part of the 1st Lower Rhine Music Festival. Friedrich August Burgmüller was hired as the ensemble's first municipal music director. From 1824 to 1833, Louis Spohr and Ferdinand Ries served as interim music directors of the ensemble. Subsequent music directors included Felix Mendelssohn Bartholdy (1833–1835), Ferdinand Hiller (1847-1850) and Robert Schumann (1850-1854). In 1864, the orchestra was officially founded when 34 musicians were officially accepted into the city's service. On the occasion of the 150th anniversary of the Düsseldorf Symphony Orchestra, the Great Hall of the Tonhalle Düsseldorf was renamed Mendelssohn Hall in honor of its former music director.

Recent principal conductors of the orchestra have included John Fiore (2000–2008) and Andrey Boreyko (2009–2014). In 2015, Ádám Fischer became principal conductor of the orchestra. Fischer and the orchestra have recorded Gustav Mahler's symphonic works for the AVI label in association with Deutschlandfunk. In September 2024, the orchestra announced the extension of Fischer's contract as principal conductor through 31 July 2030.

== Principal conductors ==
- Friedrich August Burgmüller (1812–1824)
- Felix Mendelssohn Bartholdy (1833–1835)
- Julius Rietz (1835–1847)
- Ferdinand Hiller (1847–1850)
- Robert Schumann (1850–1854)
- Julius Tausch (1854–1890)
- Julius Buths (1890–1908)
- Karl Panzner (1908–1923)
- Georg Schnéevoigt (1924–1925)
- Hans Weisbach (1925–1933)
- Hugo Balzer (1933–1945)
- Heinrich Hollreiser (1945–1952)
- Eugen Szenkar (1952–1960)
- Jean Martinon (1960–1965)
- Rafael Frühbeck de Burgos (1966–1971)
- Henryk Czyż (1971–1974)
- Willem van Otterloo (1974–1977)
- Bernhard Klee (1977–1987)
- David Shallon (1987–1993)
- Salvador Mas i Conde (1993–1999)
- John Fiore (2000–2008)
- Andrey Boreyko (2009–2014)
- Ádám Fischer (2015–present)
