= NDR Radiophilharmonie =

German radio orchestra

- Radio orchestra
- Former name: Rundfunkorchester Hannover; Radiophilharmonie Hannover
- Founded: 1950; 76 years ago
- Concert hall: Landesfunkhaus Niedersachsen
- Music director: Stanislav Kochanovsky
- Website: www.ndr.de/orchester_chor/radiophilharmonie/index.html

The NDR Radiophilharmonie is a German radio orchestra, affiliated with the Norddeutscher Rundfunk (NDR) in Hanover, the capital of Lower Saxony. The orchestra principally gives concerts in the Großer Sendesaal of the Landesfunkhaus Niedersachsen.

== History ==
A historical precursor orchestra was the Niedersächsisches Sinfonie-Orchester, a radio orchestra that was affiliated with the Nordische Rundfunk Aktiengesellschaft since the late 1920s. Following World War II, with the founding of the Nordwestdeutscher Rundfunk (NWDR), the current orchestra was founded in 1950 originally as the Rundfunkorchester Hannover. Willy Steiner was the first chief conductor, beginning in 1950, and held the post until 1975. During his tenure, the orchestra later changed its name to the Radiophilharmonie Hannover. In 2003, the orchestra took its current name of the NDR Radiophilharmonie.

After Steiner, chief conductors have been Bernhard Klee, Eiji Ōue and Eivind Gullberg Jensen. Since 2009, Ōue has held the title of conductor laureate (Ehrendirigent) with the orchestra. Since 2014, the orchestra's current chief conductor has been Andrew Manze. In March 2017, the orchestra announced the extension of Manze's contract through to 2021. In February 2019, the orchestra announced a further extension of Manze's contract to 2023. Manze concluded his tenure as chief conductor of the orchestra at the close of the 2022–2023 season.

In June 2022, Stanislav Kochanovsky first guest-conducted the orchestra. In July 2023, the orchestra announced the appointment of Kochanovsky as its next chief conductor, effective with the 2024–2025 season, with an initial contract of three seasons. In May 2026, the orchestra announced that Kochanovsky is to conclude his tenure as its chief conductor at the close of the 2026-2027 season.

The orchestra has recorded commercially for such labels as CPO and Pentatone.

== Chief conductors ==
- Willy Steiner (1950–1975)
- Bernhard Klee (1976–1979)
- Zdeněk Mácal (1980–1983)
- Aldo Ceccato (1985–1989)
- Bernhard Klee (1991–1995)
- Eiji Ōue (1998–2009)
- Eivind Gullberg Jensen (2009–2014)
- Andrew Manze (2014–2023)
- Stanislav Kochanovsky (2024–present)

=== Principal guest conductors ===
- Jörg Widmann (2023–2026)

== Venue ==
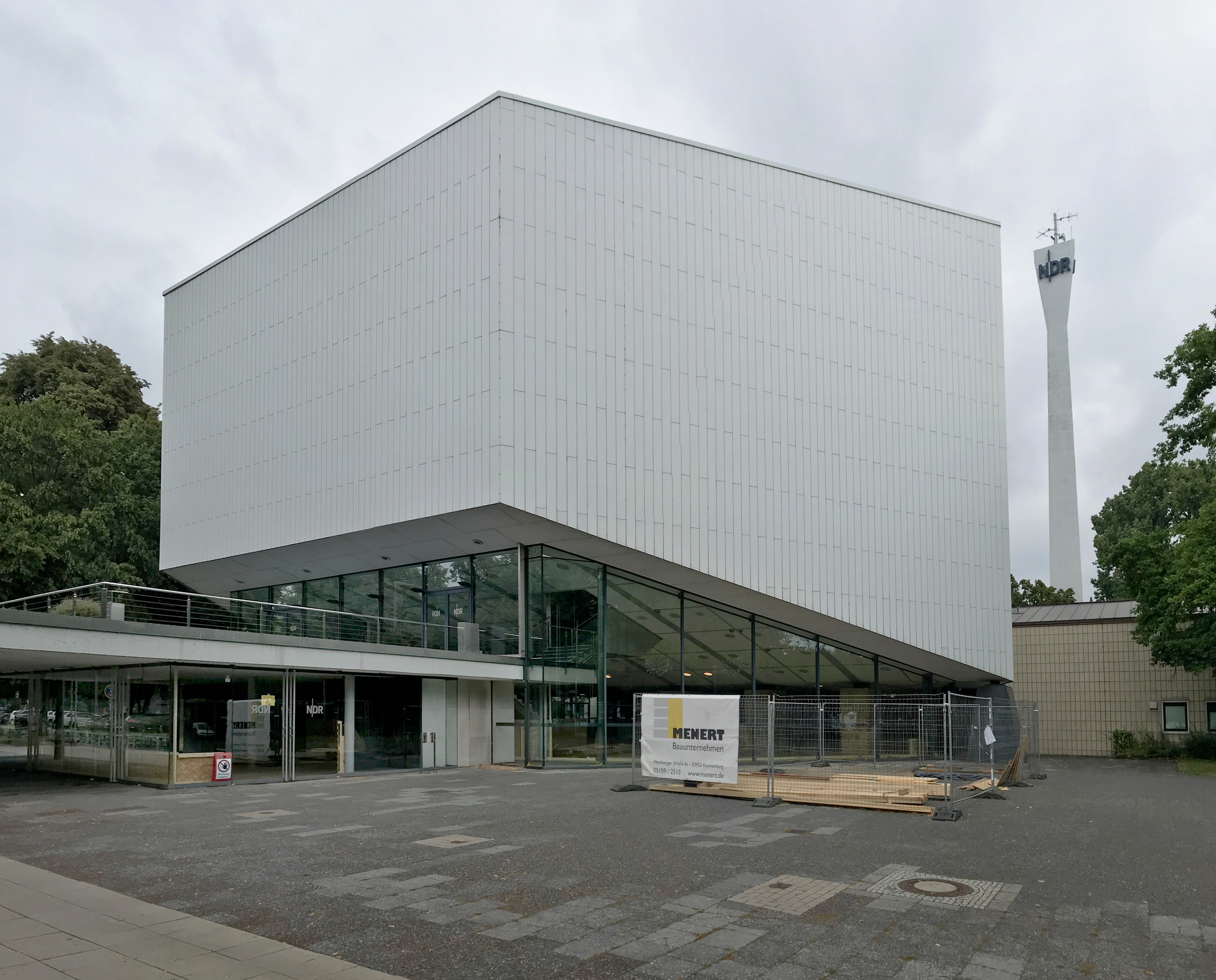
Landesfunkhaus Niedersachsen des NDR, Großer Sendesaal
