= Ulrike Steinsky =

Austrian operatic soprano

Ulrike Steinsky (born 21 September 1960) is an Austrian operatic soprano and voice teacher.

== Life ==
Born in Vienna, Steinsky completed her vocal studies with the Kammersängerin Hilde Zadek and Waldemar Kmentt. She followed this with training at the opera school of the Conservatory of the City of Vienna.

Since 1982, Steinsky has been an ensemble member of the Vienna State Opera and has also been engaged by the Vienna Volksoper since 1987. In 1995 she was appointed Kammersängerin.

Since 1992, she has also given concerts of classical Viennese music in Germany.

Since 2011, she has been working as a singing teacher in Vienna. On 3 December 2012, she was awarded the professional title of "Professor" by Federal President Heinz Fischer.

She is married to the tenor Alois Haselbacher. Her sister Eva, born in 1956, is also an opera singer (soprano). Furthermore, Steinsky is a practising Reiki therapy.

== Recordings ==
- Alban Berg: Lulu, with Julia Migenes, Margarethe Bence, Ulrike Steinsky, Theo Adam; conductor: Lorin Maazel, Orchester der Wiener Staatsoper, Ariola, Live recording 1983
- Mozart: Die Zauberflöte, with Barbara Hendricks, June Anderson, Ulrike Steinsky, Jerry Hadley, Gottfried Hornik (Papageno), Robert Lloyd, Thomas Allen, Scottish Chamber Orchestra, Scottish Chamber Chorus, conductor: Sir Charles Mackerras (Telarc 1991)
