= Klaus Hirte =

German opera singer

Klaus Hirte (28 December 1937 – 15 August 2002) was a German operatic baritone.

== Life ==
=== Training ===
Born in Berlin, Hirte grew up in Calw, learned the profession of tool and die maker and occasionally sang entertainment songs among his friends. After completing his military service, he worked as a driver for a car company in Stuttgart. At the State University of Music and Performing Arts Stuttgart he had his voice trained by Hans Hager and in 1964 he was hired as a beginner at the Staatstheater Stuttgart, where he had great success since then.

=== Career as opera singer ===
Hirte sang Beckmesser in 1971 in R. Wagner's Die Meistersinger von Nürnberg at the Staatstheater Nürnberg, a part which became his future signature role. He also sang this role at the Bavarian State Opera in Munich, in Stuttgart, at the Deutsche Oper am Rhein in Düsseldorf and from 1973 to 1975 also at the Bayreuth Festival.

Hirte died in Stuttgart at age 64.
