= Suite mignonne =

Concert suite in by Jean Sibelius (1921)

- Concert suite by Jean Sibelius
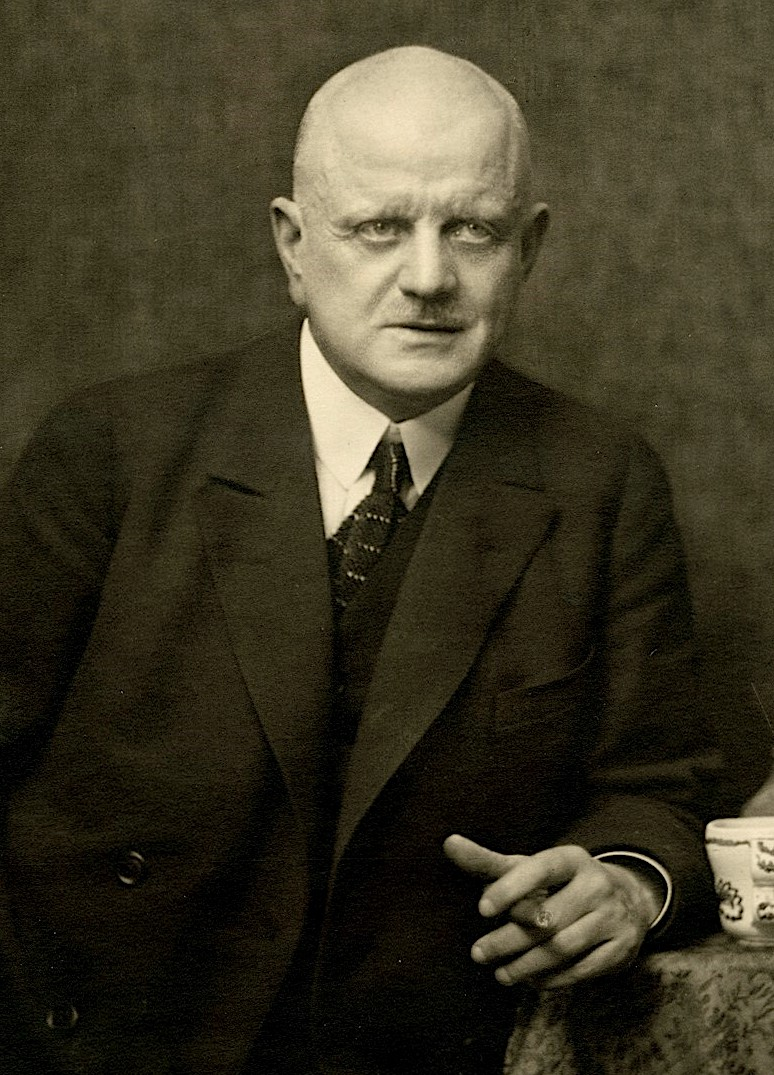
- The composer (c. 1923)
- Opus: 98a
- Composed: 1921
- Publisher: Chappell (1921)
- Duration: 8 mins.
- Movements: 3

Premiere
- Date: 6 April 1922
- Location: Helsinki, Finland
- Conductor: Karl Ekman
- Performers: Helsinki Philharmonic Orchestra

The Suite mignonne, Op. 98a, is a three-movement concert suite for two flutes and string orchestra written in 1921 by the Finnish composer Jean Sibelius.

== Structure ==
The Suite mignonne contains three movements, as follows:

1. Petite scène. Allegretto
2. Polka. Animoso
3. Épilogue. Vivace - Largamente - Vivace

== History ==
The suite was composed, and published by Chappell & Co., in 1921; it received its premiere in Helsinki on 6 April 1922, played by the Helsinki City Orchestra conducted by Karl Ekman.

== Discography ==
No.	Conductor	Ensemble	Rec. (Note: Refers to the year in which the performers recorded the work; this may not be the same as the year in which the recording was first released to the general public.)	Time	Recording venue	Label	Ref.
1	Nils-Eric Fougstedt	Finlandia Orchestra				Fennica	(Note: N. Fougstedt–Fennica (SS 6) yyyy)
2	Sir Charles Groves	Royal Liverpool Philharmonic Orchestra			Liverpool Philharmonic Hall	EMI Classics	(Note: C. Groves–EMI Classics (5 85532 2) 2003)
3	Lennart Hedwall	Örebro Chamber Orchestra	1974	6:41	Örebro Castle	Swedish Society Discofil	(Note: L. Hedwall–Swedish Society Discofil (SCD 1007) 1989)
4	Leif Segerstam	Helsinki Chamber Orchestra	1974	7:15	Sibelius Academy	BIS	(Note: L. Segerstam–BIS (LP–19) 1975)
5	Jan-Olav Wedin	Stockholm Sinfonietta	1980			Caprice	(Note: J. Wedin–Caprice (CAP 1248) yyyy)
6	Pekka Helasvuo	Finlandia Sinfonietta	1985	7:36	Laurentius Hall	Finlandia	(Note: P. Helasvuo–Finlandia (FACD 354) 1986)
7	Neeme Järvi	Gothenburg Symphony Orchestra	1987	7:28	Gothenburg Concert Hall	BIS	(Note: N. Järvi–BIS (CD–384) 1988)
8	Jukka-Pekka Saraste	Avanti!	1988		Kulttuuritalo	Kansallis-Osake-Pankki	(Note: J. Saraste–KOP (PI–DC–01) 1989)
9	William Boughton	English String Orchestra	1988	7:08	Great Hall, University of Birmingham	Nimbus	(Note: W. Boughton–Nimbus (NI 7716/7) 2000)
10	Tuomas Hannikainen	Tapiola Sinfonietta	2000	5:45	Tapiola Hall, Espoo Cultural Centre	Ondine	(Note: T. Hannikainen–Ondine (ODE 952–2) 2000)
11	Osmo Vänskä	Lahti Symphony Orchestra	2005	5:46	Sibelius Hall	BIS	(Note: O. Vänskä–BIS (CD–1921/23) 2009)

== Notes, references, and sources ==
Notes

Sources

- Barnett, Andrew (2007). Sibelius. New Haven: Yale University Press. ISBN 978-0-300-11159-0.
- Dahlström, Fabian [in Swedish] (2003). Jean Sibelius: Thematisch-bibliographisches Verzeichnis seiner Werke [Jean Sibelius: A Thematic Bibliographic Index of His Works] (in German). Wiesbaden: Breitkopf & Härtel. ISBN 3-7651-0333-0.
- Tawaststjerna, Erik (2008) [1978/1988; trans. 1997]. Sibelius: Volume III, 1914–1957. Translated by Layton, Robert. London: Faber and Faber. ISBN 978-0-571-24774-5.
