= Requiem (Schumann) =

Work for Chorus and Orchestra Op. 148 by Robert Schumann

- by Robert Schumann
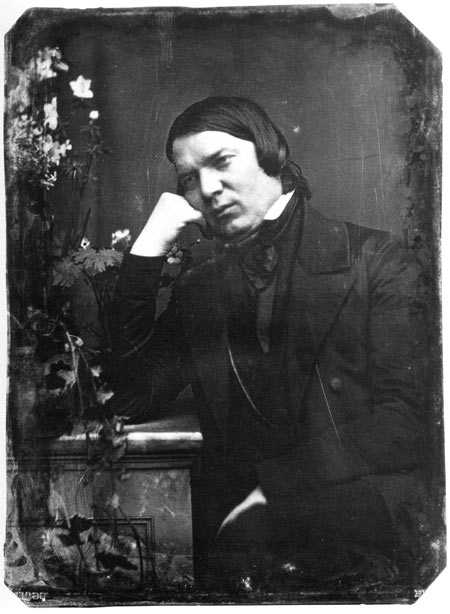
- Schumann in an 1850 daguerreotype
- Key: D♭ major
- Opus: 148
- Language: Latin
- Composed: 1852
- Published: 1865
- Duration: 33 minutes
- Movements: 9
- Scoring: Choir & Orchestra

The Requiem in D♭ major, Op. 148 is a Requiem Mass by Robert Schumann for choir and orchestra. The work was originally composed in 1852 and published in 1865, eight years after the composer's death. A performance lasts approximately 33 minutes.

== Background ==
Started in 1852, Schumann's requiem was one of the last works the composer would successfully complete. Critics point to the work as evidence of Schumann's failing creativity and mental state.

Absent any known commission, substantial questions have been raised about Schumann's motivation for writing a requiem which represented a significant departure from the composer's previous style, in which he remained mostly secular. While Schumann was contractually obligated to perform in cathedrals several times per year after his move 1850 to Düsseldorf, documentation is not conclusive on the composer's religious background.

During Schumann's stay in an asylum for a suicide attempt, his requiem was one of few that he continued to compose. The original manuscript indicates that it was heavily revised, demonstrating Schumann's poor state of mind. It is speculated that Schumann, like Mozart, was writing his own mass.

== Structure ==
The work consists of nine movements:

1. Requiem
2. Te decet
3. Dies irae
4. Liber scriptus
5. Qui Mariam absolvisti
6. Domine Jesu Christe
7. Hostias et preces tibi
8. Sanctus
9. Benedictus

== Notable recordings ==
- Bernhard Klee, Cond.
- Hungarian State Orchestra, József Gregor, bass, June 3, 1987.
- Bavarian Radio Symphony Orchestra, Wolfgang Sawallisch cnnd., October 7, 1996.
- Saarbrücken-Kaiserslautern Philharmonic Orchestra, Sibylla Rubens soprano, Christoph Prégardien tenor, Ingeborg Danz alto, Georg Grün cond., 2015.
