= David Shallon =

Israeli conductor (1950–2000)

David Shallon (Hebrew: דוד שאלון; 15 October 1950 in Tel Aviv, Israel – 15 or 16 September 2000 in Tokyo, Japan) was an Israeli conductor.

== Biography ==
David Shallon learned the violin and French horn as a boy. At the Tel Aviv Music Academy, he studied conducting with Noam Sheriff and continued his studies in Vienna with Hans Swarowsky, where he met his future wife, the German violist Tabea Zimmermann.

At the invitation of Leonard Bernstein, he became his assistant, and conducted Gustav Mahler's 3rd Symphony with the Wiener Symphoniker in 1980. He has performed with world-famous soloists since then, including Gidon Kremer, Radu Lupu, Alicia de Larrocha, Itzhak Perlman, András Schiff, Heinrich Schiff, Isaac Stern, Frank Peter Zimmermann and Tabea Zimmermann. He has also conducted performances at various opera houses, such as the Vienna State Opera, the Frankfurt Opera, the Deutsche Oper am Rhein in Düsseldorf, the Amsterdam Opera and the New Israeli Opera in Tel Aviv. From 1987 to 1993 he was general music director of the Düsseldorf Symphony Orchestra, and was the principal conductor of the Jerusalem Symphony Orchestra from 1992 to 2000, and finally the Luxembourg Philharmonic Orchestra from 1997 until his death.

In September 2000, Shallon died suddenly and unexpectedly from an asthma attack in Tokyo during a concert tour in Japan.
