= Edith Mathis =

Swiss soprano (1938–2025)

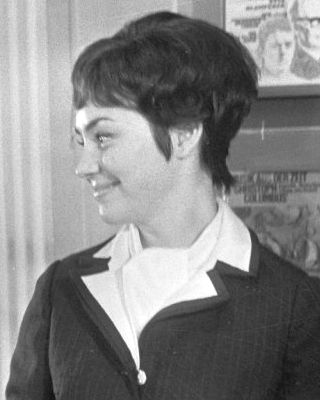
- Mathis in 1969
- Born: 11 February 1938; Lucerne, Switzerland
- Died: 9 February 2025 (aged 86); Salzburg, Austria
- Occupations: Operatic soprano; Academic teacher
- Organizations: Deutsche Oper Berlin; University of Music and Performing Arts Vienna
- Title: Kammersängerin
- Spouse: Bernhard Klee (divorced)
- Awards: Mozart Medal; Hans-Reinhart-Ring

Edith Mathis (Swiss Standard German: [ˈeːdɪt ˈmatɪs]; 11 February 1938 – 9 February 2025) was a Swiss soprano known for her roles in Mozart's operas. Early in her career, Cherubino in Le nozze di Figaro was her signature role that she performed at debuts at several opera houses and festivals in Europe. Later, she portrayed Susanna in the same opera, Zerlina in Don Giovanni and Pamina in Die Zauberflöte. She took part in premieres of operas, Henze's Der junge Lord and works by Gottfried von Einem, Menotti and Heinrich Sutermeister. Based at Deutsche Oper Berlin from 1963 to 1971, she was in demand internationally, also as a singer of Lied and in concert.

Mathis recorded operas, symphonies by Gustav Mahler and oratorios with the leading conductors of her time. She recorded many of Bach's church cantatas in Karl Richter's cycle, and Lieder by Mozart, Schubert, Schumann, Richard Strauss and Hugo Wolf. From 1992, she taught Lied interpretation at the University of Music and Performing Arts Vienna and in master classes.

== Career ==
Edith Mathis was born in Lucerne on 11 February 1938. She was determined from a young age to become a singer, inspired by listening to recordings and broadcasts with Renata Tebaldi and Maria Callas. She studied voice at the Lucerne Conservatory with Elisabeth Bossart. She made her operatic debut at the Luzerner Theater in 1956 as the Second Boy in Mozart's Die Zauberflöte. Good reviews helped her get an invitation to perform as Cherubino in Mozart's Le nozze di Figaro at the Opernhaus Zürich. She continued gaining stage experience in Switzerland for the next three years. In 1959 she moved to the Cologne Opera, where Wolfgang Sawallisch was then musical director. Her roles there included Cherubino and Zerlina in Mozart's Don Giovanni.

She appeared regularly at the Salzburg Festival from 1960. In the early 1960s she made frequent guest appearances, often as Cherubino, at the Hamburg State Opera in 1960, at the Vienna State Opera in 1962, and at the Glyndebourne Festival in 1963. She became a member of the Deutsche Oper Berlin that year, and performed as Cherubino with the company in Tokyo. She appeared in Berlin first as Zerlina, and was compared to Audrey Hepburn as she "embodied this ideal of girlish, at once high-spirited and vulnerable innocence visually, with large dark eyes, short dark hair and delicate appearance". She portrayed other young women "with unaffected elegance": Susanna in Le nozze di Figaro, Sophie in Der Rosenkavalier by Richard Strauss, Ännchen in Weber's Der Freischütz and Pamina in Die Zauberflöte, the latter with "touching sadness". She became a favourite with the audience, and remained at the house until 1971.

In 1964 she performed at the Hamburg State Opera in the world premiere of Gottfried von Einem's Der Zerrissene after Nestroy. In more premieres, she appeared in Berlin as Luise in Henze's Der junge Lord in 1965, and portrayed the girl Emily in Menotti's Hilfe, Hilfe, die Globolinks in Hamburg in 1968.

She had guest contracts with Hamburg, Oper Frankfurt and the Bavarian State Opera. Her first role in Munich was Pamina in Die Zauberflöte in 1970 as part of the opera festival. She returned regularly, also as Susanna in Le nozze di Figaro and Zerlina in Don Giovanni, Marzelline in Beethoven's Fidelio, the Countess in Figaro, as Zdenka in Arabella by Richard Strauss, and as Mélisande in Debussy's Pelleas. She took part there, as Queen Marie, in the world premiere of Heinrich Sutermeister's Le roi Berénger after Ionesco in 1985.

Between 1970 and 1972 she performed 25 times at the Metropolitan Opera in New York City, as Pamina in Die Zauberflöte, Marzelline in Fidelio, Ännchen in Der Freischütz and Zerlina in Don Giovanni. She made her debut at the Royal Opera House in London in 1970. In the 1970s she appeared in more major European opera houses including the Opéra de Paris. She performed at the Vienna State Opera, after Cherubino, also as Zerlina in Don Giovanni between 1972 and 1985, Sophie in Der Rosenkavalier by Richard Strauss, Susanna in Figaro between 1976 and 1986, and Pamina. Throughout her career, Mathis remained within her lyric soprano range, expanding her repertoire by Agathe in Der Freischütz and the Marschallin in Der Rosenkavalier. She retired from the stage in 2001.

In addition to her operatic career, Mathis made numerous international concert tours in Lieder recitals. Singing Lieder, she was focused on the texts and their settings, serving the poet and the composer. Mathis led a Lied class as a professor at the University of Music and Performing Arts Vienna from 1992 to 2006. She gave master classes in Europe, Asia and the US. One of her students was Diana Damrau.

"Sull'aria...che soave zeffiretto", a duet from Le nozze di Figaro that she performed with Gundula Janowitz as the Countess, features prominently in the film The Shawshank Redemption. According to The New York Times, they "soar over a prison yard, signifying joy and hope in a world of despair".

== Personal life ==
Mathis was married to conductor and pianist Bernhard Klee, with whom she often performed. After they divorced, she lived with her second husband, the art collector Heinz Slunecko, in Salzburg.

Mathis died in Salzburg on 9 February 2025, two days before her 87th birthday.

== Awards ==
- Mozart Medal of the International Mozarteum Foundation Salzburg (1976)
- Hans-Reinhart-Ring (1978)
- Kunst- und Kulturpreis der Stadt Luzern (1978)
- Kammersängerin in Bavaria (1979)
- Buxtehude-Preis of the senate of Lübeck (1981)
- Prix Mondial du disque, of Montreux

== Discography ==
- J. S. Bach
  - 75 cantatas, Münchener Bach-Chor, Münchener Bach-Orchester, conductor Karl Richter, Teldec & Archiv 1959–1979
  - Matthäus-Passion, 1979, with Janet Baker, Schreier, Dietrich Fischer-Dieskau, Matti Salminen, Regensburger Domspatzen, Münchener Bach-Chor and Orchestra, Richter. Archiv Produktion
  - Bach cantatas (solo cantatas BWV 202, 51, church cantatas 99, 106) – with conductors Peter Schreier, Wolfgang Gönnenwein
- Beethoven: Fidelio, as Marzelline, 1969, Lukaskirche Dresden, Staatskapelle Dresden, MDR Rundfunkchor, cond. Karl Böhm. Deutsche Grammophon (DG)
- Berlioz: La damnation de Faust, as Marguerite, 1973, Symphony Hall, Boston, Boston Symphony, Tanglewood Festival Chorus, Boston Boy Choir, cond. Seiji Ozawa. DG.
- Brahms
  - Ein deutsches Requiem, 1972, with Fischer-Dieskau, London Philharmonic, Edinburgh Festival Chorus, cond. Daniel Barenboim. DG.
  - Volkslieder, Volks-Kinderlieder, 1975, Edith Mathis soprano, Peter Schreier tenor, Karl Engel piano. DG.
  - Liebeslieder Waltzes, Neue Liebeslieder, and Quartets, Op. 64, 1981, with Brigitte Fassbaender, Schreier, Fischer-Dieskau, pianists Karl Engel and Wolfgang Sawallisch, DG.

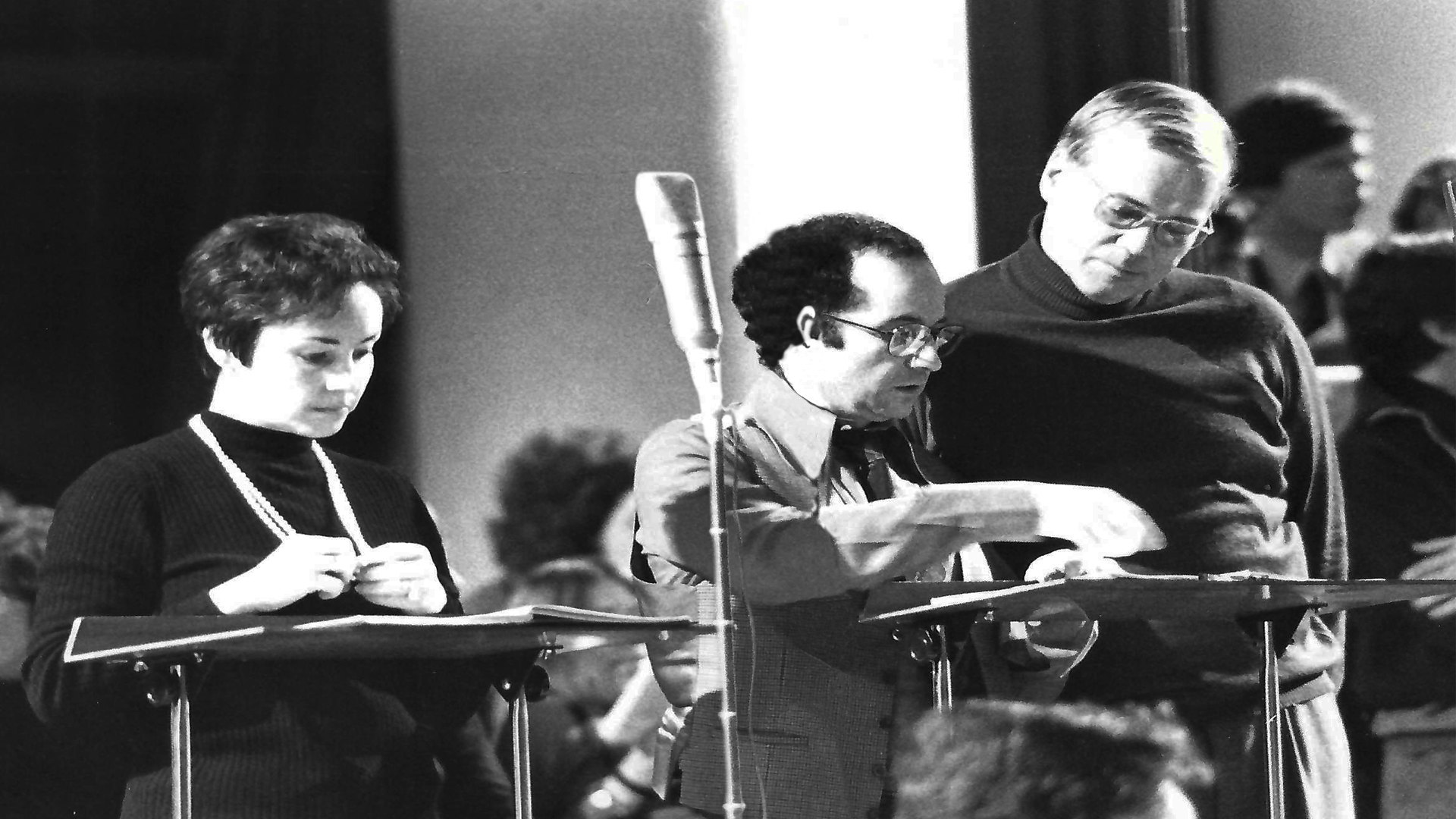
Soloists working on Die Schöpfung, 1980

- Haydn
  - Il mondo della luna, 1978, Orchestre de Chambre de Lausanne, cond. Antal Doráti, Philips
  - Die Schöpfung, 1980, with Aldo Baldin, Fischer-Dieskau, Chorus and Academy of St Martin in the Fields, cond. Marriner. Philips.
  - Die Jahreszeiten, 1981, with Siegfried Jerusalem, Fischer-Dieskau, Chorus and Academy of St Martin in the Fields, cond. Neville Marriner. Philips.
  - Die Schöpfung, 1983, with Francisco Araiza, José van Dam, Wiener Singverein, Wiener Philharmoniker, cond. Herbert von Karajan (live recording) DG.
- Mahler
  - Symphony No. 2 "Resurrection", 1967, cond. Rafael Kubelik
  - Symphony No. 4, 1972, Vienna Philharmonic, cond. Leonard Bernstein, DG.
  - Symphony No. 4, 1979, Berlin Philharmonic, cond. Herbert von Karajan, DG.
  - Symphony No. 2 "Resurrection", 1982, with Doris Soffel, London Philharmonic Orchestra & Choir, cond. Klaus Tennstedt. EMI
- W. A. Mozart
  - Requiem, 1963, New Philharmonia Orchestra & Chorus, cond. Rafael Frühbeck de Burgos. EMI.
  - Great Mass in C minor, 1963, with Helen Donath, Theo Altmeyer, Franz Crass, Süddeutscher Madrigalchor, Südwestdeutsches Kammerorchester, cond. Gönnenwein. EMI.
  - Le nozze di Figaro, 1966, as Cherubino, DVD from the Salzburg Festival of 1966, with Ingvar Wixell, Claire Watson, Reri Grist, Walter Berry. Wiener Philharmoniker, cond. Böhm.
  - Le nozze di Figaro, 1968, as Susanna, Figaro: Hermann Prey, Countess: Janowitz, Count: Fisher-Dieskau, Cherubino: Tatiana Troyanos, Choir and Orchestra of Deutsche Oper Berlin, cond. Böhm. DG.
  - Requiem, 1971, Wiener Philharmoniker, Konzertvereinigung Wiener Staatsopernchor, cond. Böhm. DG.
  - Die Zauberflöte, Hamburg State Opera directed by Sir Peter Ustinov, filmed 1971, with Tamino: Gedda, Pamina: Mathis, Sarastro: Hans Sotin, Queen of the Night: Cristina Deutekom, Papageno: William Workman, Papagena: Carol Malone, Monostatos: Franz Grundheber, Speaker: Fischer-Dieskau, Two Men in Armour: Helmut Melchert, Moll, cond. Horst Stein. Arthaus DVD.
  - Don Giovanni, 1978, Wiener Philharmoniker, cond. Karl Böhm, DG.
  - Idomeneo, 1979, Staatskapelle Dresden, cond. Karl Böhm, DG.
  - Exsultate, jubilate and other sacred arias for soprano, 1979, cond. Bernhard Klee
  - Die Zauberflöte, 1980, Berlin Philharmonic, cond. Herbert von Karajan, DG.
  - Der Messias, arrangement of Handel's Messiah, 1990, cond. Charles Mackerras
- Nicolai: Die lustigen Weiber von Windsor, 1976, with Kurt Moll (Falstaff), Bernd Weikl (Ford), Siegfried Vogel (Mr. Page), Schreier (Fenton), Mathis (Mrs. Ford), Hanna Schwarz (Mrs. Page), Donath (Anne), Choir of the Staatsoper Berlin, Staatskapelle Berlin, cond. Klee. Berlin Classics.
- Richard Strauss: Der Rosenkavalier, as Sophie, 1969, Großes Festspielhaus Salzburg (live), Wiener Philharmoniker, Choir of the Vienna State Opera, cond. Böhm. DG.

Mathis made many recordings of Lied repertoire, by Mozart in 1973 with Bernhard Klee and in 1986 with Karl Engel, by Schumann with Christoph Eschenbach, also by Schubert, Richard Strauss and Hugo Wolf. She recorded Handel's Neun Deutsche Arien in 1966 with the Consortium Musicum and arias by Haydn in 1981, conducted by Armin Jordan.
