= The Merry Wives of Windsor (opera) =

Opera by Otto Nicolai

Die lustigen Weiber von Windsor
- Singspiel by Otto Nicolai
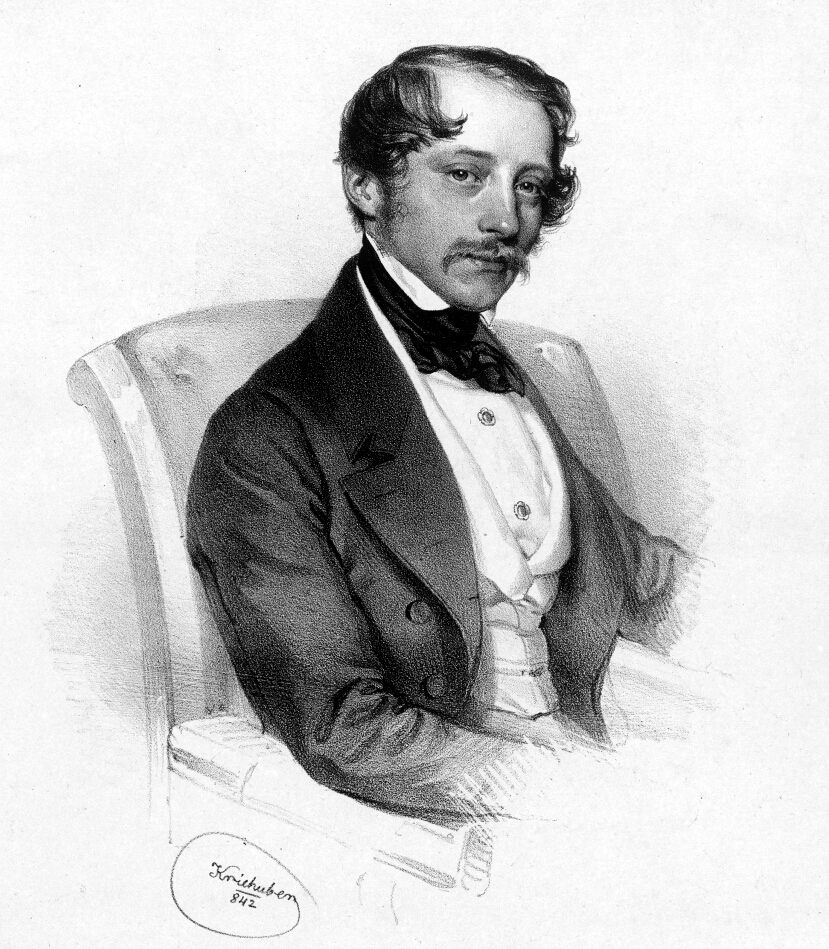
- The composer in 1842
- Translation: The Merry Wives of Windsor
- Librettist: Salomon Hermann Mosenthal
- Language: German
- Based on: The Merry Wives of Windsor by Shakespeare
- Premiere: 9 March 1849; Königliches Opernhaus Berlin

Die lustigen Weiber von Windsor, or The Merry Wives of Windsor, is an 1849 opera in three acts by Otto Nicolai to a German libretto by Salomon Hermann Mosenthal based on Shakespeare's play. Published as a comical-fantastical work in three acts with dance (komisch-phantastische Oper in 3 Akten mit Tanz), its structure is musical numbers linked by spoken dialogue, harkening back to the then-outmoded Singspiel format. It remains popular in Germany and Austria and its overture is sometimes heard in concert in other countries.

== Composition history ==
Nicolai wrote most of the music in 1845 and 1846 but was able to adjust the score in 1849 just before the work's delayed premiere. He had earlier won success with four Italian melodramatic operas, viz. Rosmonda d’Inghilterra, Gildippe ed Odoardo, Il templario and Il proscritto, the last of which he revised to a German libretto as Die Heimkehr des Verbannten, to additional acclaim, in 1843, leading to his attention to the Shakespeare, in German. Die lustigen Weiber von Windsor was to become his acknowledged masterpiece. The composer was confident enough to adjust Mosenthal's libretto.

== Performance history ==
It was difficult at first to find a stage that was willing to mount the opera. Following the premiere at the Königliches Opernhaus (Royal Opera House, now Berlin State Opera) in Berlin on 9 March 1849 under the baton of the composer, it proved unsuccessful at first, having been cancelled after a mere four shows. Its ongoing success started to gain traction only some time after Nicolai's death. Though the libretto and the dramaturgy may seem old-fashioned to today's audiences, the piece nevertheless remains popular to this day.

The music is of such high quality that the work is performed with increasing regularity. 23 performances of four productions were planned in four German cities between March and July 2012.

=== Overture ===
Overture
Performed in 1993 by the U.S. Marine Band (8:39)

The overture inspired the short musical film, Overture to The Merry Wives of Windsor. Edwin Lemare also made a transcription for organ. In addition, Peter Richard Conte transcribed the score for the Wanamaker Organ.

== Roles ==
Roles, voice types, premiere cast
Role	Voice type	Premiere cast, 9 March 1849 Conductor: Otto Nicolai
Frau Fluth (Alice Ford)	soprano	Leopoldine Tuczek
Frau Reich (Meg Page)	mezzo-soprano	Pauline Marx
Sir John Falstaff	bass	August Zschiesche
Fenton	tenor	Julius Pfister
Herr Fluth (Ford)	baritone	Julius Krause
Anna Reich (Anne Page)	soprano	Louise Köster
Herr Reich (Page)	bass	August Mickler
Spärlich (Slender)	tenor	Eduard Mantius
Dr. Cajus	bass	A. Lieder
Robin	spoken	
The innkeeper	spoken	
A waiter	spoken	
First citizen	tenor	
Second, third, and fourth citizens	spoken	
Two servants of Herr Fluth	silent	
Chorus of men and women of Windsor, neighbors, elves, spooks, and insects

== Synopsis ==
=== Act 1 ===
Scene 1

Two married ladies, Frau Fluth and Frau Reich, discover that they both received love letters from the impoverished nobleman Falstaff at the same time. They decide to teach him a lesson and withdraw to hatch a plan. Now the husbands of Frau Fluth and Frau Reich come in. Anna, Frau Reich's daughter, is of marriageable age and three gentlemen seek her hand in marriage: Dr. Cajus, a French beau, is her mother's favorite, and her father wants the shy nobleman Spärlich as his son-in-law, but Anna is in love with the penniless Fenton.

Scene 2

Frau Fluth has invited Falstaff to a supposed tryst, and he enters with grand romantic gestures and clumsily attempts to ensnare her. As Frau Reich reports the return of the distrustful Herr Fluth, which had been previously arranged, the old gentleman is hidden in a laundry basket, the contents of which are quickly emptied into a ditch. Herr Fluth has searched the whole house in the meantime without success and is forced to believe his wife, who protests her innocence.

=== Act 2 ===
Scene 1

At the inn, Falstaff has recovered from his bath and sings bawdy drinking songs. A messenger brings him a letter, in which Frau Fluth proposes another rendezvous. Her husband appears in disguise and presents himself as Herr Bach to get Falstaff to talk about his trysts. He unsuspectingly brags about his affair with Frau Fluth, which provokes her husband's rage.

Scene 2

Spärlich and Cajus sneak around Anna's window, but before they attempt to go near, they hear Fenton's serenade and hide in the bushes. From there they observe a passionate love scene between the two lovers.

Scene 3

Falstaff is again with Frau Fluth, and Frau Reich again warns them both that Herr Fluth is on his way home. This time they dress the fat knight in women's clothes to try and pass him off as the maid. Herr Fluth enters and finds only the old maid, whom he angrily throws out of the house.

=== Act 3 ===
Scene 1

Fluth and Reich are finally let in on the plan by their wives and the four of them decide to take Falstaff for a ride one last time. The knight is expected to show up at a grand masked ball in Windsor Forest. Additionally, Herr and Frau Reich each plan to take advantage of the confusion to marry Anna off to their preferred suitor. Instead, however, she has arranged a nighttime meeting with Fenton in the forest.

Scene 2

After the moonrise, depicted by the choir and orchestra, the masked ball in the forest begins. At first, Falstaff, disguised as Ritter Herne, is lured by the two women, but then he is frightened by various other guests disguised as ghosts, elves, and insects. After the masks are removed and Falstaff is mocked by everyone, Anna and Fenton, who got married in the forest chapel, appear. In a cheerful closing number all of the parties are reconciled.

== Music ==
The opera follows the Singspiel tradition, in which musical numbers are connected by spoken dialog. Nicolai referred to the work as a "komisch-fantastische Oper" ("comic/fantasy opera"), reflecting its fusion of romantic opera in the style of Carl Maria von Weber and the comic operas of Albert Lortzing, which were very popular at the time. On the romantic side are the love scenes between Anna and Fenton, the ghost and elf music and, naturally, the moonrise. The opera buffa element comes into play with the figure of Falstaff, the husbands, and both of the suitors spurned by Anna.

== Noted arias ==
- "Horch, die Lerche singt im Hain" ("Hark! The lark sings in the grove") (Fenton)
- "Als Büblein klein an der Mutter Brust" ("As a little rascal on my mother's breast") (Falstaff)
- "Nun eilt herbei" ("Now hurry here") (Frau Fluth)
- "Wie freu' ich mich" ("How pleased I am") (Falstaff and Herr Fluth)

== Instrumentation ==
The opera is scored for two flutes (second doubling piccolo), two oboes, two clarinets, two bassoons, four horns, two trumpets, three trombones, timpani, bass drum, cymbals, tenor drum, triangle, harp, strings, plus offstage harp and offstage bell in G.

== Adaptations ==
- A 1950 East German film adaptation The Merry Wives of Windsor directed by Georg Wildhagen
- A 1965 Austrian–British film adaptation The Merry Wives of Windsor directed by Georg Tressler

== Recordings ==
- Capriccio 60094: Franz Hawlata, Dietrich Henschel, Heinz Zednik, Juliane Banse, Regina Klepper; Landesjugendchor NRW; WDR Rundfunkorchester Köln; Helmuth Froschauer, conductor
- Deutsche Grammophon 2740 159: Edith Mathis, Hanna Schwarz, Kurt Moll, Bernd Weikl, Siegfried Vogel, Peter Schreier, Claude Dormoy; Chorus of the Staatsoper; Staatskapelle Berlin; Bernhard Klee, conductor, 1976
- Decca D86D 3: Helen Donath, Karl Ridderbusch, Wolfgang Brendel, Lilian Sukis; Bavarian Radio Chorus; Bavarian Radio Symphony Orchestra; Rafael Kubelík, conductor
- EMI 29 0940 3: Gottlob Frick, Ernst Gutstein, Kieth Engen, Fritz Wunderlich, Edith Mathis; Chorus and orchestra of the Bavarian State Opera; Robert Heger, conductor
- Preiser PR90208, Cantus Classics, Aura LRC 1118, Wilhelm Strienz, Georg Hann, Ludwig Windisch, Walter Ludwig, Lore Hoffmann, Irma Beilke, Marie Luise Schilp, Berlin Radio Symphony Orchestra, Choir of the Städtische Oper Berlin, Artur Rother, conductor, 1943.
