= Suite champêtre =

Concert suite in by Jean Sibelius (1922)

- Concert suite by Jean Sibelius
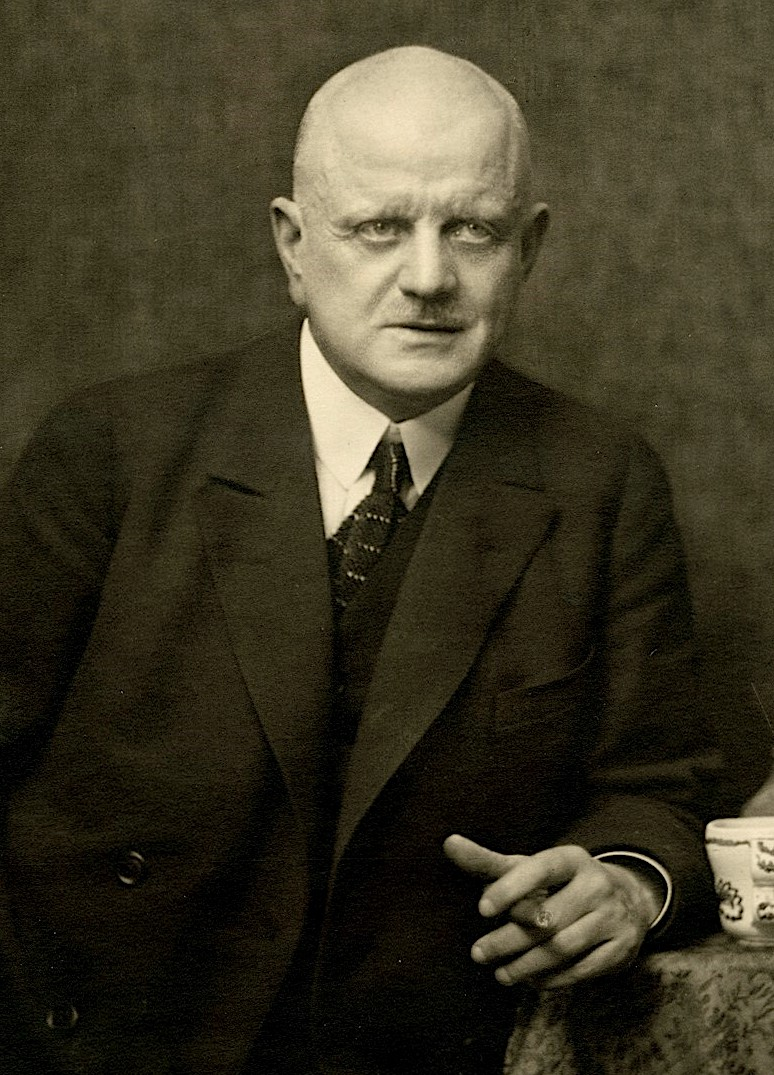
- The composer (c. 1923)
- Opus: 98b
- Composed: 1922
- Publisher: Hansen (1923)
- Duration: 7 mins.
- Movements: 3

Premiere
- Date: 19 February 1923
- Location: Helsinki, Finland
- Conductor: Jean Sibelius
- Performers: Helsinki Philharmonic Orchestra

The Suite champêtre, Op. 98b, is a three-movement concert suite for string orchestra written in 1921 by the Finnish composer Jean Sibelius.

== History ==
Sibelius finished composing the Suite champêtre on 7 February 1922; immediately, he mailed it to the London-based publishing firm Chappell & Co., which had accepted the three-movement Suite mignonne (Op. 98a, 1921) for two flutes and strings the previous year. However, Chappell refused the new suite, and in the end, Sibelius reached an agreement in April with Copenhagen's Edition Wilhelm Hansen.

== Structure ==
The Suite champêtre contains three movements, as follows:

1. Pièce caractéristique. Comodo
2. Mélodie élégiaque. Poco adagio
3. Danse. Allegretto

== Discography ==
No.	Conductor	Ensemble	Rec. (Note: Refers to the year in which the performers recorded the work; this may not be the same as the year in which the recording was first released to the general public.)	Time	Recording venue	Label	Ref.
1	Sir Charles Groves	Royal Liverpool Philharmonic Orchestra	1973-75		Liverpool Philharmonic Hall	EMI Classics	(Note: C. Groves–EMI Classics (5 85532 2) 2003)
2	Pekka Helasvuo	Finlandia Sinfonietta	1985	7:18	Laurentius Hall	Finlandia	(Note: P. Helasvuo–Finlandia (FACD 354) 1986)
3	Neeme Järvi	Gothenburg Symphony Orchestra	1987	9:04	Gothenburg Concert Hall	BIS	(Note: N. Järvi–BIS (CD–384) 1988)
4	Péter Csaba	Virtuosi di Kuhmo		7:53		Ondine	(Note: P. Csaba–Ondine (ODE 830–2) 1994)
5	Juha Kangas	Ostrobothnian Chamber Orchestra	1994	7:27	Kaustinen Church	Finlandia	(Note: J. Kangas–Finlandia (4509–98995–2) 1996)
6	William Boughton	English String Orchestra	1988	7:37	Great Hall, University of Birmingham	Nimbus	(Note: W. Boughton–Nimbus (NI 7716/7) 2000)
7	Tuomas Hannikainen	Tapiola Sinfonietta	2000	6:22	Tapiola Hall, Espoo Cultural Centre	Ondine	(Note: T. Hannikainen–Ondine (ODE 952–2) 2000)
8	Osmo Vänskä	Lahti Symphony Orchestra	2005	7:27	Sibelius Hall	BIS	(Note: O. Vänskä–BIS (CD–1921/23) 2009)

== Notes, references, and sources ==
Notes

Sources

- Barnett, Andrew (2007). Sibelius. New Haven: Yale University Press. ISBN 978-0-300-11159-0.
- Dahlström, Fabian [in Swedish] (2003). Jean Sibelius: Thematisch-bibliographisches Verzeichnis seiner Werke [Jean Sibelius: A Thematic Bibliographic Index of His Works] (in German). Wiesbaden: Breitkopf & Härtel. ISBN 3-7651-0333-0.
- Tawaststjerna, Erik (2008) [1978/1988; trans. 1997]. Sibelius: Volume III, 1914–1957. Translated by Layton, Robert. London: Faber and Faber. ISBN 978-0-571-24774-5.
