= Requiem for Mignon =

Choral work by Robert Schumann

Requiem für Mignon
- by Robert Schumann
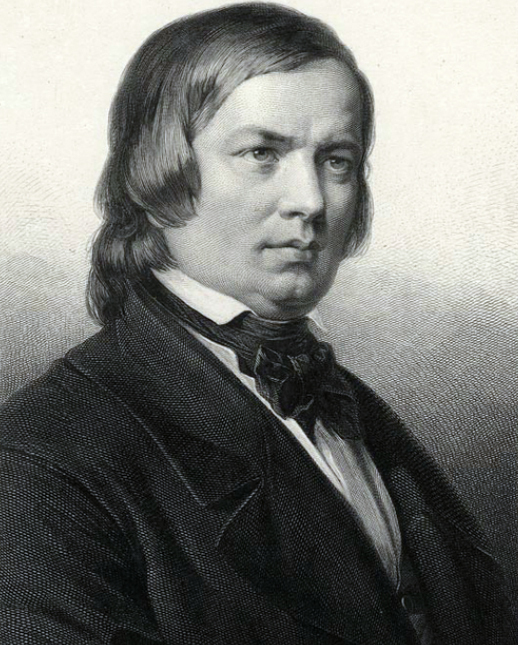
- English: Requiem for Mignon
- Key: C minor
- Opus: 98b
- Period: Romantic
- Genre: Requiem
- Composed: 1849
- Movements: 3
- Scoring: Chorus & Orchestra

Premiere
- Date: November 21, 1851

Requiem for Mignon (German: Requiem für Mignon) is a six movement work by Robert Schumann for choir and orchestra. The work was originally composed in 1849, premiered in 1851, and runs approximately 13 minutes.

== Development ==
Schumann was reportedly fascinated by Goethe's Wilhelm Meisters Lehrjahre and dedicated both parts of his Op. 98 (the songs Lieder und Gesänge aus 'Wilhelm Meister', Op.98a, and the Requiem for Mignon, Op. 98b) to the book. Schumann was particularly interested in a character named Mignon, a young woman born out of incest. The year of its composition marked the centenary of Goethe's birth, and Schumann acknowledged this in several of his works.

Schumann laid the foundation for the Requiem on July 2 and 3, 1849 and finished its orchestration in September of the same year. The work would premier in a concert for Düsseldorf Allgemeiner Musikverein on November 21, 1851.

== Content ==
Contrasting with other requiems of the time which represented masses for the dead, Requiem for Mignon describes only Mignon's funeral scene at the end of the book. In this scene, four coffin boys are reconciled by her death. These boys are represented by four adult female voices in Schumann's orchestration, but the work is sometimes performed with boys nevertheless.

Schumann ends the requiem on a semi-positive note, before Mignon's identity and origin are discovered. The work instead focuses on the girl's sickly life and her yearning for the immortal. The work ends by stating that her yearnings for the immortal are satisfied and that life is to continue.

== Structure ==
The work consists of 6 movements that run without stopping:

1. Langsam - C minor - Chorus
2. Etwas bewegter - C minor - Soprano and Alto
3. Lebhaft -C major - Chorus
4. Feierlich, doch nicht zu langsam - F major - Chorus
5. Die Viertel wie vorher die Halben - C major - Bass
6. Lebhaft - C major - Chorus

== Notable performances ==
Notable performances of the work include:

- Bernhard Klee, cond. Schumann - Requiem Op. 148, Requiem für Mignon Op. 98b + P° (reference recording: Bernhard Klee)
- Chamber Orchestra of Europe, January 1, 1992 Schumann: Requiem für Mignon, Op. 98b - I. Langsam feierlich Schumann: Requiem für Mignon, Op. 98b - VI. Lebhaft
- Michel Corboz, cond., 1998 Schumann : Requiem for Mignon Op.98b
- William Dazeley, cond., January 1, 2010. Schumann: Requiem für Mignon aus Goethes "Wilhelm Meister", Op.98b For Soloists, Chorus And...
- Conservatory of Innsbruch Choir, January 1, 2011 Schumann - Requiem für Mignon Op. 98B
