= Doris Soffel =

German mezzo-soprano (born 1948)

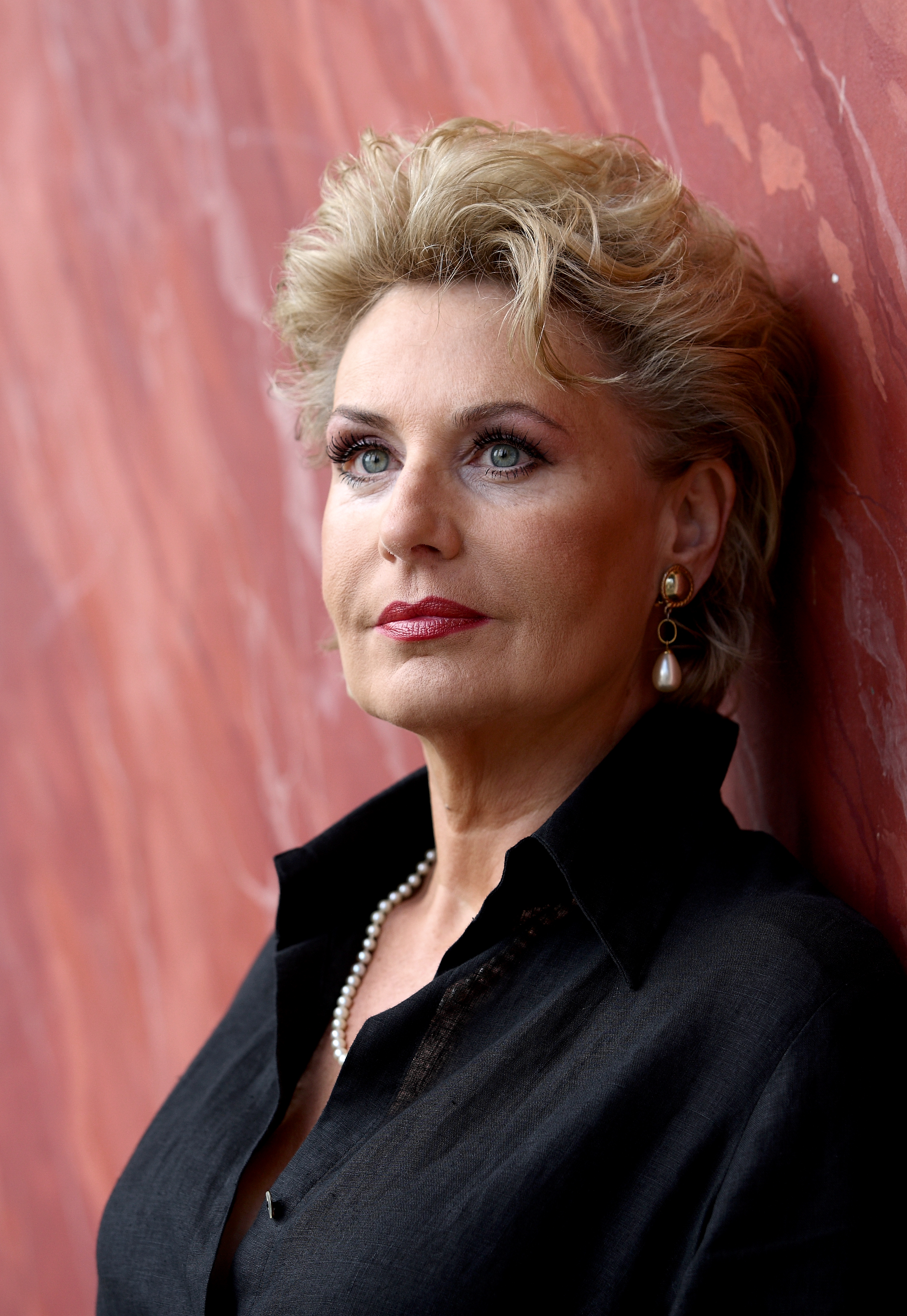
Doris Soffel

Doris Soffel (born 12 May 1948, Hechingen, Germany) is a German mezzo-soprano.

Doris Soffel first played the violin, then switched to singing at the Hochschule für Musik und Theater München. She was member of the Stuttgart Opera ensemble from 1973 to 1982. Her international breakthrough was as Sesto in Mozart's La clemenza di Tito at the Royal Opera House, London in 1982. She sang Fricka in the Bayreuth Festival 1983 and was the only German coloratura mezzo with an international career, singing in works by Gioachino Rossini, Gaetano Donizetti, and Vincenzo Bellini. She sang world premieres by contemporary composers like Aribert Reimann and Krysztof Penderecki and had performances worldwide of Gustav Mahler's vocal works. From 1994, more dramatic roles like Judith in Béla Bartók's Bluebeard's Castle, Eboli in Verdi's Don Carlo and Amneris in his Aïda. Since 1999 she belongs to the most important interpreters of operas by Richard Wagner and Richard Strauss (e.g. Ortrud, Kundry, Fricka, Herodias and Amme). In 2007 she sang the female principal part (Marfa) in the Mussorgsky's Khovanshchina in Munich. She appears on about 60 CDs and several DVDs.

In 1994, she performed at the Nobel Prize Award ceremony.

== Honours ==
- 2026: Officière de l´Ordre des Arts et des lettres
- 2025: Order of Merit of the Federal Republic of Germany
- 2025: Honorary Member of the Deutsche Oper Berlin
- 2007: Kammersängerin
- 2001: Order of the Polar Star

== Repertoire ==
Opera

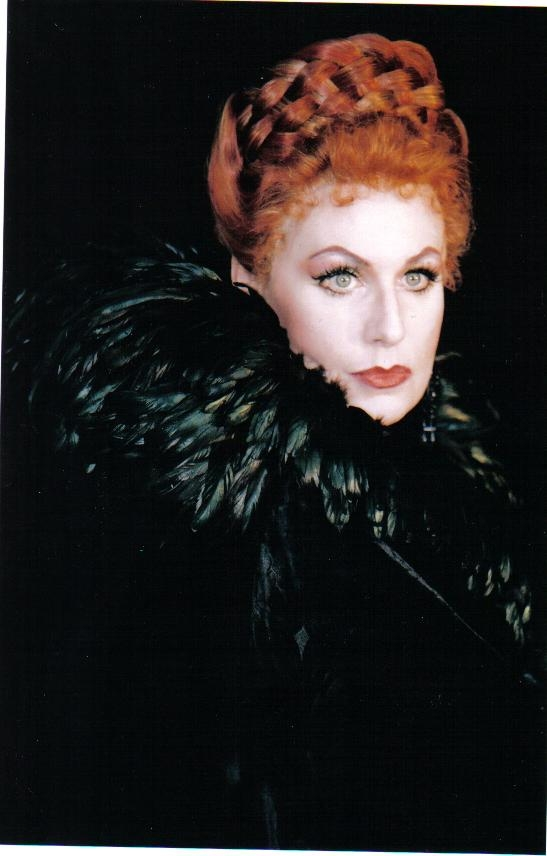
Ortrud, Lohengrin

Composer	Opera	Part
Béla Bartók	A Kékszakállú herceg vára (Bluebeard's Castle)	Judit
Vincenzo Bellini	Norma	Adalgisa
Alban Berg	Lulu	Gräfin Geschwitz
Hector Berlioz	Les Troyens	Didon
Georges Bizet	Carmen	Carmen
Francesco Cilea	Adriana Lecouvreur	La Principessa di Bouillon
Gaetano Donizetti	Anna Bolena	Giovanna di Seymour
	La Favorita	Leonora di Guzman
	Maria Stuarda	Elisabetta
Antonín Dvořák	Rusalka	Hexe Jezibaba
Friedrich von Flotow	Martha oder Der Markt zu Richmond	Nancy
Christoph Willibald Gluck	Orfeo ed Euridice	Orfeo
George Frideric Handel	Hercules	Dejanira
Leoš Janáček	Káta Kabanová	Kabanicha
Pietro Mascagni	Cavalleria rusticana	Santuzza
Jules Massenet	Hérodiade	Hérodiade
	Werther	Charlotte
Wolfgang Amadeus Mozart	Così fan tutte	Dorabella
	La Clemenza di Tito	Sesto
	Die Zauberflöte	Zweite Dame
Modest Mussorgsky	Boris Godunow	Marina Mnisek
	Chowantschina	Marfa
Krzysztof Penderecki	Ubu Rex	Mère Ubu
Amilcare Ponchielli	La Gioconda	Laura Adorno
Francis Poulenc	Dialogues des Carmelites	Madame de Croissy
Aribert Reimann	Troades	Kassandra
Gioachino Rossini	Cenerentola	Angelina
	Il Barbiere di Siviglia	Rosina
	L'Italiana in Algeri	Isabella
	Mosè in Egitto	Sinaide
Camille Saint-Saëns	Samson et Dalila	Dalila
Othmar Schoeck	Penthesilea	Penthesilea
Louis Spohr	Jessonda	Amazili
Johann Strauss	Die Fledermaus	Prinz Orlofsky
Richard Strauss	Elektra	Klytämnestra
	Ariadne auf Naxos	Der Komponist
	Capriccio	Clairon
	Die Frau ohne Schatten	Die Amme
	Der Rosenkavalier	Octavian
	Salome	Herodias
Igor Stravinsky	Oedipus Rex	Jocaste
Pyotr Ilyich Tchaikovsky	Orleanskaja Deva	Jeanne d'Arc
	Pique Dame	Gräfin
Giuseppe Verdi	Aida	Amneris
	Don Carlos	Eboli
	Un ballo in Maschera	Ulrika
	Il Trovatore	Azucena
Richard Wagner	Götterdämmerung	Waltraute
	Lohengrin	Ortrud
	Parsifal	Kundry
	Das Rheingold	Fricka
	Rienzi: Der letzte der Tribunen	Adriano
	Tannhäuser und der Sängerkrieg auf Wartburg	Venus
	Tristan und Isolde	Brangäne
	Die Walküre	Fricka
Hugo Wolf	Der Corregidor	Frasquita
Alexander Zemlinsky	Eine Florentinische Tragödie	Bianca

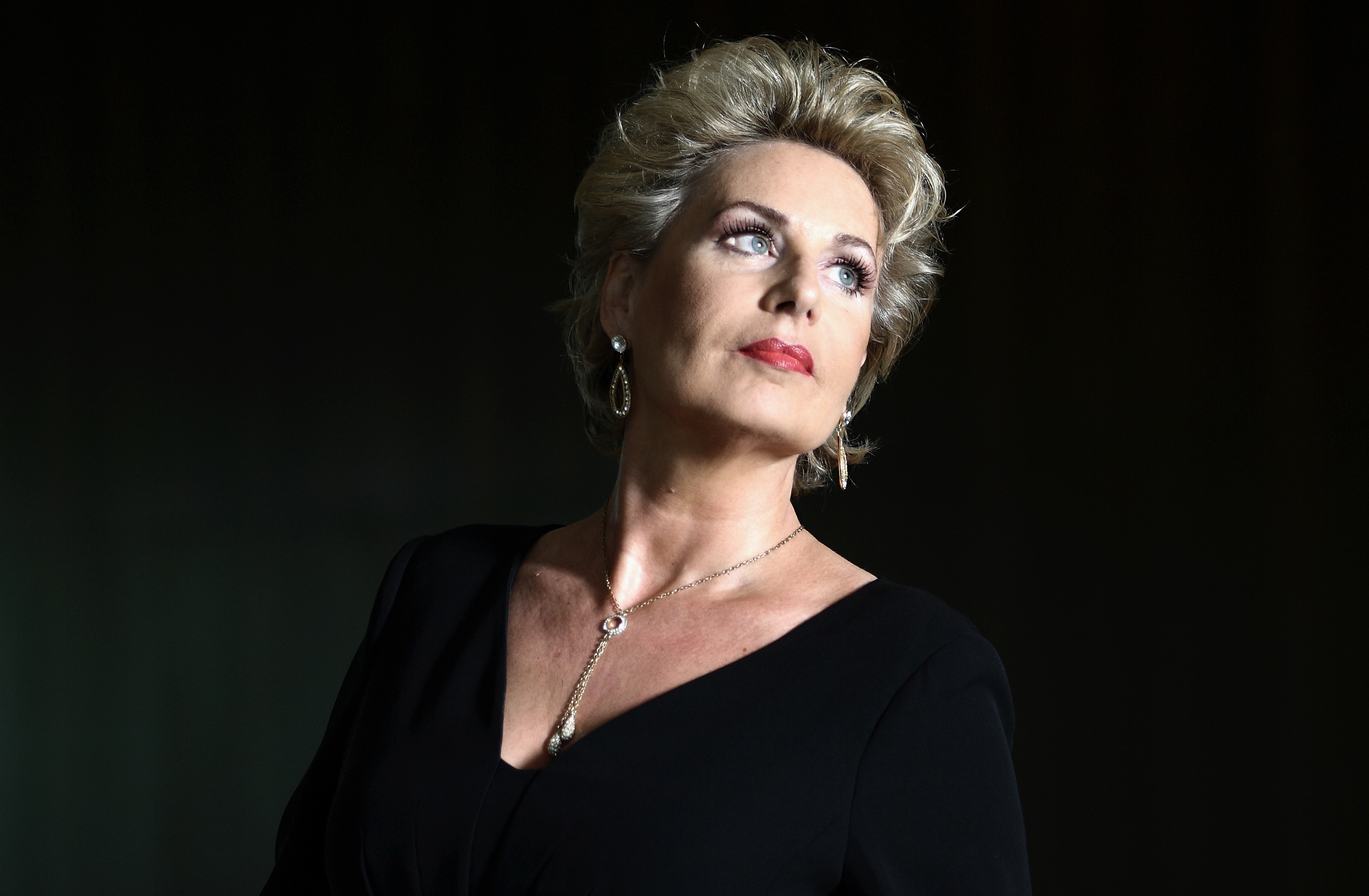
Doris Soffel

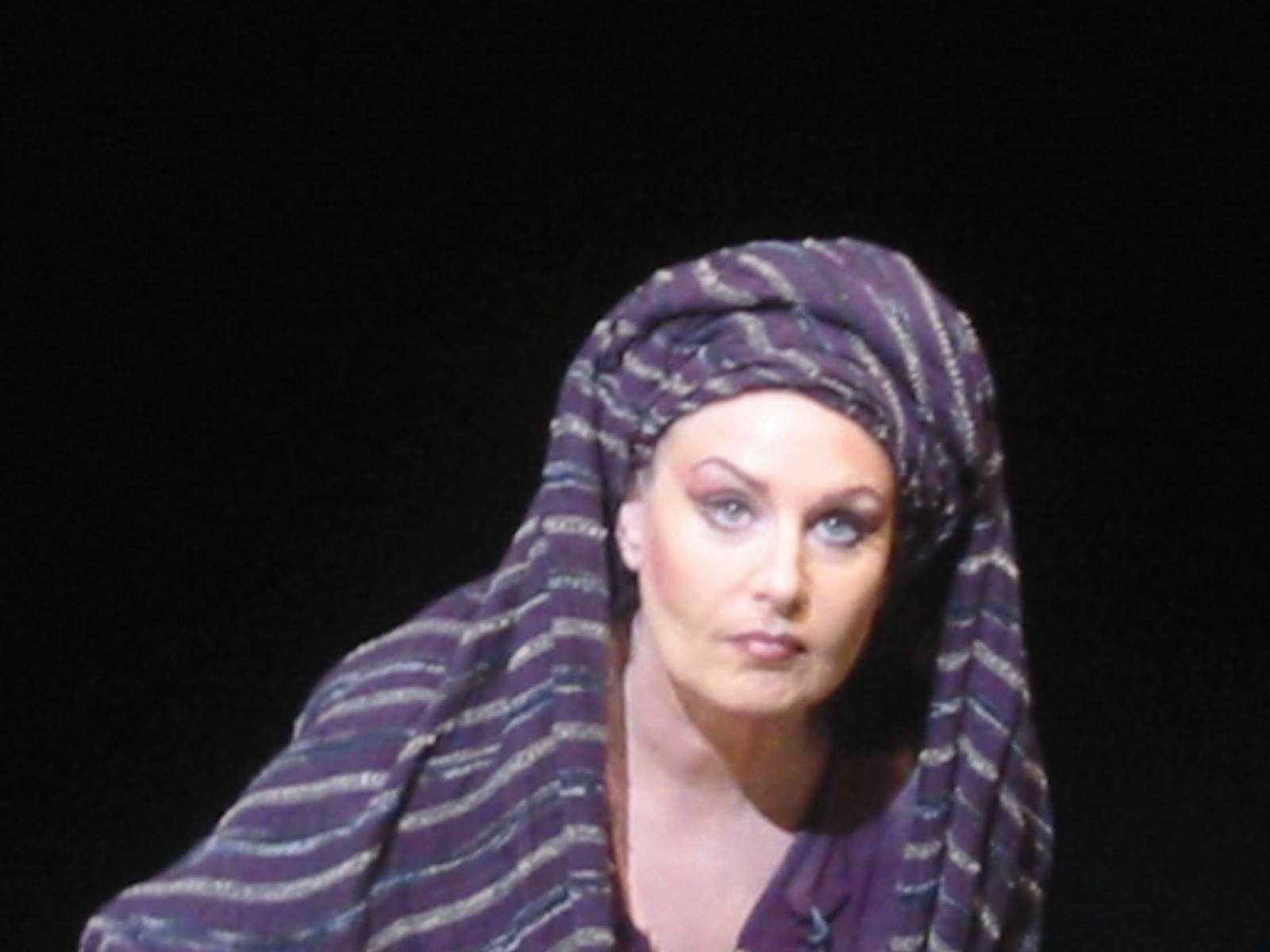
Kundry in Parsifal

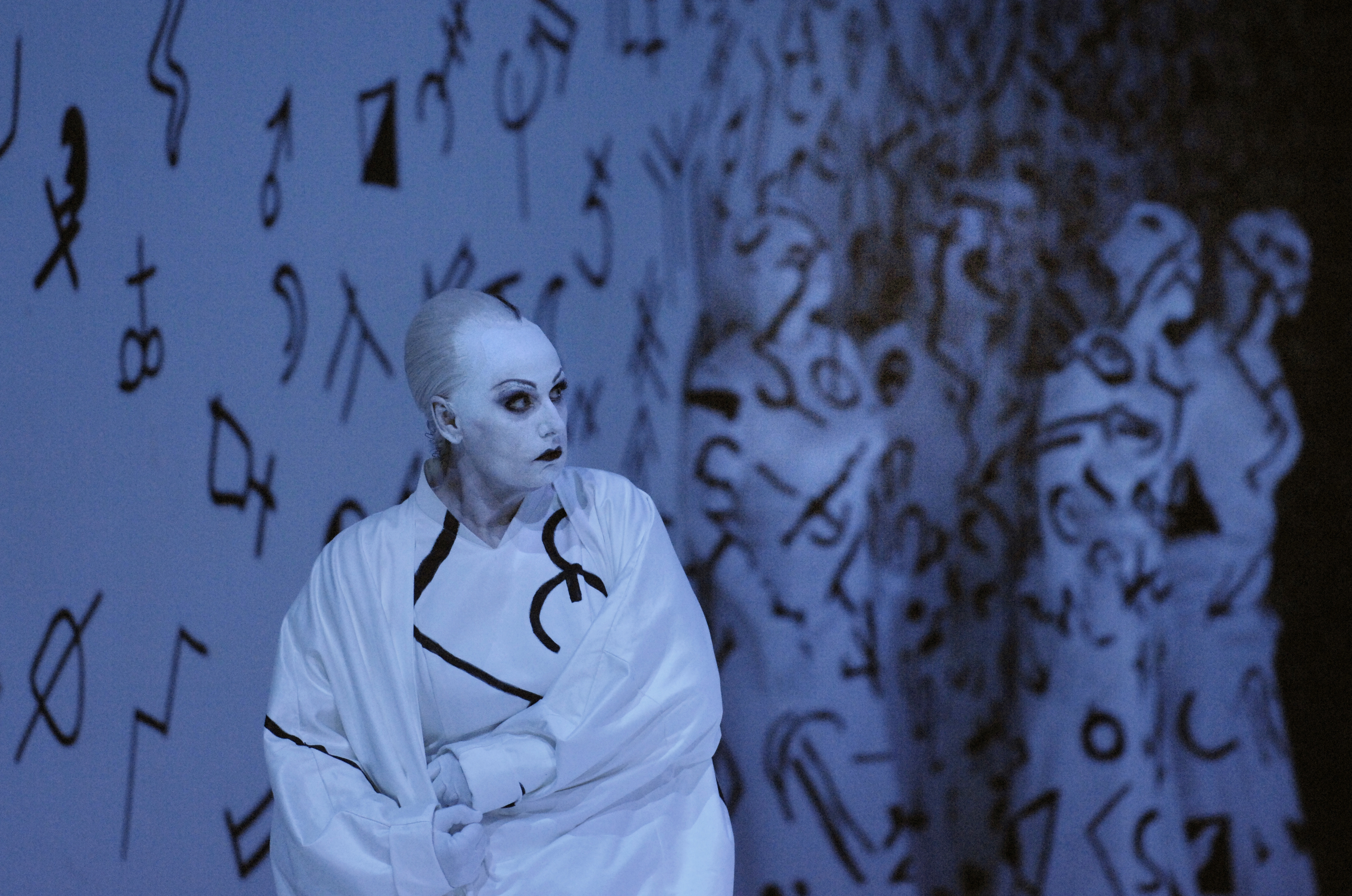
Amme in Frau ohne Schatten

Concerts

Johann Sebastian Bach	Passionen und Oratorien	Mezzo
Ludwig van Beethoven	Missa solemnis D-dur op.123	Mezzo
	Symphonie No. 9	Alto
Hector Berlioz	Mort de Cleopâtre	Mezzo
	Nuits d´été	Mezzo
	Damnation de Faust	Marguerite
Johannes Brahms	Lieder Brahms	Mezzo
Anton Bruckner	Mass No. 3 in F minor	Alto
Joseph Haydn	Harmoniemesse B-dur Hob.XXII:13	Alto
	Heiligmesse B-dur Hob XXII:10	Alto
	Missa Sanctae Caeciliae C-dur	Alto
Karl Amadeus Hartmann	Symphonie 1 Versuch eines Requiem (on texts by Walt Whitman)	Alto
Gustav Mahler	Das Lied von der Erde	Mezzo
	Kindertotenlieder	Mezzo
	Sinfonie Nr.2 c-moll (Auferstehung)	Alto
	Sinfonie Nr.8 Es-dur (Sinf.der Tausend)	Alto
	Symphonie No. 3	Mezzo
	Rückert-Lieder	Mezzo
	Lieder eines fahrenden Gesellen	Mezzo
Hermann Reutter	Lieder	Mezzo
Franz Schubert	Lieder und Liederzyklen	Mezzo
Erwin Schulhoff	Landschaften/Menschheit	Mezzo
Robert Schumann	Lieder und Liederzyklen	Mezzo
Arnold Schoenberg	Gurrelieder	Waldtaube
Wolfgang von Schweinitz	Liederzyklus "Papiersterne"	Mezzo
Alexander Scriabin	Symphonie Nr. 1 E-Dur	Mezzo
Richard Strauss	Lieder und Liederzyklen	Mezzo
Giuseppe Verdi	Requiem	Mezzo
Richard Wagner	Wesendonk-Lieder	Mezzo
Alexander Zemlinsky	Maeterlink Orchesterlieder	Mezzo
