= Glyndebourne Festival Opera: history and repertoire, 1952–63 =

This is a list of the operas performed by Glyndebourne Festival Opera during the music directorship (1952-1963) of Vittorio Gui. Operas performed by Glyndebourne forces at venues other than Glyndebourne are also included.

| Year | Opera | Composer | Principal cast | Conductor | Director | Designer |
|---|---|---|---|---|---|---|
| 1952 | Idomeneo | Mozart | Richard Lewis (Idomeneo), Léopold Simoneau (Idamante), Sena Jurinac (Ilia), Maria Kinasiewicz (Electra) | John Pritchard | Revival of 1951 production | |
| 1952 | La Cenerentola | Rossini | Marina de Gabaráin (Cenerentola), Juan Oncina (Ramiro), Sesto Bruscantini (Dandini), Ian Wallace (Don Magnifico) | Vittorio Gui | Carl Ebert | Oliver Messel |
| 1952 | Così fan tutte | Mozart | Sena Jurinac (Fiordiligi), Anna Pollak (Dorabella), Richard Lewis (Ferrando), Sesto Bruscantini (Guglielmo), Alda Noni (Despina), Dezsö Ernster (Don Alfonso) | Vittorio Gui | Revival of 1948 production | |
| 1952 | Macbeth | Verdi | Marko Rothmüller (Macbeth), Dorothy Dow (Lady Macbeth), James Johnston (Macduff) | Vittorio Gui | Revival of 1938 production | |
| 1953 | Alceste | Gluck | Magda László (Alceste), Richard Lewis (Admète), Thomas Hemsley (Hercules) | Vittorio Gui | Carl Ebert | Hugh Casson, Rosemary Vercoe |
| 1953 | La Cenerentola | Rossini | Marina de Gabaráin (Cenerentola), Juan Oncina (Ramiro), Sesto Bruscantini (Dandini), Ian Wallace (Don Magnifico) | Vittorio Gui | Revival of 1952 production | |
| 1953 | Ariadne auf Naxos | Strauss | Dorothy Dow (Ariadne), Mattiwilda Dobbs (Zerbinetta), Carlos Guichandut (Bacchus), Kurt Gester (Harlekin), Sena Jurinac (Composer) | John Pritchard | Carl Ebert | Oliver Messel |
| 1953 | Die Entführung aus dem Serail | Mozart | Sári Barabás (Constanze), Helmut Krebs (Belmonte), Fritz Ollendorf (Osmin), Emmy Loose/April Cantelo (Blonde), Murray Dickie (Pedrillo) | Alfred Wallenstein | Revival of 1950 production | |
| 1953 | Così fan tutte | Mozart | Sena Jurinac/Rita McKerrow (Fiordiligi), Anna Pollak (Dorabella), Juan Oncina/Alexander Young (Ferrando), Geraint Evans (Guglielmo), Alda Noni (Despina), Sesto Bruscantini (Don Alfonso) | John Pritchard | Revival of 1948 production | |
| 1953 | The Rake's Progress | Stravinsky | Richard Lewis (Tom Rakewell), Elsie Morison (Anne), Jerome Hines (Nick Shadow), Nan Merriman (Baba the Turk) | Alfred Wallenstein | Carl Ebert | Osbert Lancaster |
| 1953 | Idomeneo | Mozart | Richard Lewis (Idomeneo), Helmut Krebs (Idamante), Sena Jurinac (Ilia), Jennifer Vyvyan (Electra) | John Pritchard | Revival of 1951 production | |
| 1954 | The Barber of Seville | Rossini | Sesto Bruscantini (Figaro), Graziella Sciutti (Rosina), Juan Oncina (Almaviva), Ian Wallace (Bartolo), Antonio Cassinelli (Basilio) | Vittorio Gui | Carl Ebert | Oliver Messel |
| 1954 | Alceste | Gluck | Magda László (Alceste), Richard Lewis (Admète), Thomas Hemsley (Hercules) | Vittorio Gui/Bryan Balkwill | Revival of 1953 production | |
| 1954 | Arlecchino | Busoni | Kurt Gester (Arlecchino), Ian Wallace (Ser Matteo), Geraint Evans (Abbate), Fritz Ollendorf (Dottore), Murray Dickie (Leandro), Elaine Malbin (Colombina) | John Pritchard | Peter Ebert | Peter Rice |
| 1954 | Ariadne auf Naxos | Strauss | Lucine Amara (Ariadne), Mattiwilda Dobbs/Ilse Hollweg (Zerbinetta), Richard Lewis (Bacchus), Kurt Gester (Harlekin), Sena Jurinac (Composer) | John Pritchard | Revival of 1953 production | |
| 1954 | Don Giovanni | Mozart | James Pease (Don Giovanni), Margaret Harshaw (Donna Anna), Sena Jurinac (Donna Elvira), Benno Kusche (Leporello), Léopold Simoneau (Don Ottavio) | Georg Solti | Revival of 1951 production | |
| 1954 | The Rake's Progress | Stravinsky | Richard Lewis (Tom Rakewell), Elsie Morison (Anne), Marko Rothmüller (Nick Shadow), Marina de Gabaráin (Baba the Turk) | Paul Sacher/Bryan Balkwill | Revival of 1953 production | |
| 1954 | Le comte Ory | Rossini | Juan Oncina (Ory), Sári Barabás (Adèle), Sesto Bruscantini (Raimbaud), Fernanda Cadoni (Isolier) | Vittorio Gui | Carl Ebert | Olivier Messel |
| 1954 | Ariadne auf Naxos | Strauss | Lucine Amara (Ariadne), Mattiwilda Dobbs (Zerbinetta), Richard Lewis (Bacchus), Kurt Gester (Harlekin), Sena Jurinac (Composer) | John Pritchard | Revival of 1953 Glyndebourne production | |
| 1954 | Così fan tutte | Mozart | Sena Jurinac (Fiordiligi), Magda László (Dorabella), Juan Oncina/Richard Lewis (Ferrando), Geraint Evans (Guglielmo), Alda Noni (Despina), Sesto Bruscantini (Don Alfonso) | Vittorio Gui/John Pritchard | Carl Ebert | Rolf Gérard, Rosemary Vercoe |
| 1954 | The Soldier's Tale | Stravinsky | Anthony Nicholls (Narrator), Terence Longdon (Soldier), Robert Helpmann (Devil), Moira Shearer (Princess) | Hans Schmidt-Isserstedt | Günther Rennert | Alfred Mahlau |
| 1955 | The Marriage of Figaro | Mozart | Sesto Bruscantini (Figaro), Elena Rizzieri (Susanna), Franco Calabrese (Count), Sena Jurinac (Countess), Frances Bible/Risë Stevens (Cherubino) | Vittorio Gui | Carl Ebert | Oliver Messel |
| 1955 | Le comte Ory | Rossini | Juan Oncina (Ory), Sári Barabás (Adèle), Giuseppe Valdengo (Raimbaud), Fernanda Cadoni (Isolier) | Vittorio Gui | Revival of 1954 production | |
| 1955 | Don Giovanni | Mozart | Giuseppe Valdengo (Don Giovanni), Sena Jurinac (Donna Anna), Lucina Amara (Donna Elvira), Geraint Evans (Leporello), Richard Lewis (Don Ottavio) | John Pritchard | Revival of 1951 production | |
| 1955 | The Barber of Seville | Rossini | Sesto Bruscantini (Figaro), Gianna D'Angelo (Rosina), Juan Oncina (Almaviva), Ian Wallace (Bartolo), Cristiano Dalamangas (Basilio) | Vittorio Gui/Bryan Balkwill | Revival of 1954 production | |
| 1955 | The Rake's Progress | Stravinsky | Richard Lewis (Tom Rakewell), Elsie Morison (Anne), Marko Rothmüller (Nick Shadow), Marina de Gabaráin (Baba the Turk) | Paul Sacher | Revival of 1953 production | |
| 1955 | Falstaff | Verdi | Fernando Corena (Falstaff), Anna Maria Rovere (Alice), Walter Monachesi (Ford), Oralia Dominguez (Mistress Quickly), Eugenia Ratti (Nannetta), Juan Oncina/Kevin Miller (Fenton) | Carlo Maria Giulini | Carl Ebert | Osbert Lancaster |
| 1955 | La forza del destino | Verdi | Sena Jurinac (Leonora), David Poleri (Don Alvaro), Marko Rothmüller (Don Carlo), Hervey Alan (Padre Guardiano), Marina de Gabaráin (Preziosilla), Ian Wallace (Fra Melitone) | John Pritchard | Peter Ebert | Leslie Hurry |
| 1956 | Idomeneo | Mozart | Richard Lewis (Idomeneo), William McAlpine (Idamante), Elisabeth Grümmer (Ilia), Lucille Udovick (Electra) | John Pritchard | Revival of 1951 production | |
| 1956 | Die Entführung aus dem Serail | Mozart | Mattiwilda Dobbs (Constanze), Ernst Haefliger (Belmonte), Arnold van Mill (Osmin), Lisa Otto (Blonde), Kevin Miller (Pedrillo) | Paul Sacher/Peter Gellhorn | Carl Ebert | Oliver Messel |
| 1956 | The Magic Flute | Mozart | Ernst Haefliger (Tamino), Pilar Lorengar (Pamina), Geraint Evans (Papageno), Frederick Guthrie/Drago Bernardic (Sarastro), Mattiwilda Dobbs (Queen of the Night) | Vittorio Gui | Carl Ebert | Oliver Messel |
| 1956 | Così fan tutte | Mozart | Sena Jurinac (Fiordiligi), Nan Merriman (Dorabella), Richard Lewis/Juan Oncina (Ferrando), Sesto Bruscantini (Guglielmo), Elena Rizzieri (Despina), Ivan Sardi (Don Alfonso) | Vittorio Gui/John Pritchard | Revival of 1954 production | |
| 1956 | Don Giovanni | Mozart | Kim Borg (Don Giovanni), Sena Jurinac (Donna Anna), Elisabeth Lindermeier/Doreen Watts (Donna Elvira), Geraint Evans (Leporello), Richard Lewis (Don Ottavio) | John Pritchard/Bryan Balkwill | Revival of 1951 production | |
| 1956 | The Marriage of Figaro | Mozart | Sesto Bruscantini (Figaro), Elena Rizzieri (Susanna), Michel Roux (Count), Elisabeth Grümmer/Joan Sutherland (Countess), Cora Canne Meijer (Cherubino) | Vittorio Gui/Maurits Sillem | Revival of 1955 production | |
| 1957 | L'italiana in Algeri | Rossini | Oralia Dominguez (Isabella), Juan Oncina (Lindoro), Paolo Montarsolo (Mustafa), Marcello Cortis (Taddeo) | Vittorio Gui | Peter Ebert | Osbert Lancaster |
| 1957 | Le comte Ory | Rossini | Juan Oncina (Ory), Sári Barabás (Adèle), Heinz Blankenburg (Raimbaud), Fernanda Cadoni (Isolier) | Vittorio Gui | Revival of 1954 production | |
| 1957 | Der Schauspieldirektor | Mozart | Joan Sutherland (Mme Herz), Naida Labay (Mme Silberklang), Alexander Young (Herr Herz), Gwyn Griffiths (Herr Buff) | Bryan Balkwill | Anthony Besch | Peter Rice |
| 1957 | Ariadne auf Naxos | Strauss | Lucine Amara (Ariadne), Mimi Coertse/Sári Barabás (Zerbinetta), David Lloyd (Bacchus), Heinz Blankenburg (Harlekin), Elisabeth Söderström (Composer) | John Pritchard | Revival of 1954 production | |
| 1957 | Falstaff | Verdi | Geraint Evans (Falstaff), Orietta Moscucci (Alice), Antonio Boyer (Ford), Oralia Dominguez (Mistress Quickly), Antonietta Pastori (Nannetta), Juan Oncina (Fenton) | Vittorio Gui | Revival of 1955 production | |
| 1957 | Die Entführung aus dem Serail | Mozart | Wilma Lipp (Constanze), Ernst Haefliger (Belmonte), Mihály Székely (Osmin), Rosl Schwaiger (Blonde), Kevin Miller (Pedrillo) | Paul Sacher | Revival of 1956 production | |
| 1957 | The Magic Flute | Mozart | David Lloyd (Tamino), Pilar Lorengar (Pamina), Geraint Evans/Heinz Blankenburg (Papageno), Mihály Székely (Sarastro), Margareta Hallin (Queen of the Night) | Paul Sacher/Peter Gellhorn | Revival of 1956 production | |
| 1958 | Falstaff | Verdi | Geraint Evans (Falstaff), Ilva Ligabue (Alice), Mario Borriello (Ford), Oralia Dominguez (Mistress Quickly), Graziella Sciutti (Nannetta), Juan Oncina (Fenton) | Vittorio Gui | Revival of 1955 production | |
| 1958 | Alceste | Gluck | Consuelo Rubio (Alceste), Richard Lewis (Admète), Robert Massard (Hercules) | Vittorio Gui | Revival of 1953 production | |
| 1958 | The Marriage of Figaro | Mozart | Geraint Evans (Figaro), Graziella Sciutti (Susanna), Michel Roux (Count), Pilar Lorengar (Countess), Teresa Berganza (Cherubino) | Hans Schmidt-Isserstedt | Revival of 1955 production | |
| 1958 | The Rake's Progress | Stravinsky | Richard Lewis (Tom Rakewell), Elsie Morison (Anne), Otakar Kraus (Nick Shadow), Gloria Lane (Baba the Turk) | Paul Sacher | Revival of 1953 production | |
| 1958 | Le comte Ory | Rossini | Juan Oncina (Ory), Sári Barabás (Adèle), Heinz Blankenburg (Raimbaud), Fernanda Cadoni (Isolier) | John Pritchard | Revival of 1954 production | |
| 1958 | Il segreto di Susanna | Wolf-Ferrari | Mary Costa (Countess), Michel Roux (Gil) | John Pritchard | Peter Ebert | Carl Toms |
| 1958 | Ariadne auf Naxos | Strauss | Lucine Amara (Ariadne), Rita Streich (Zerbinetta), Richard Lewis (Bacchus), Heinz Blankenburg (Harlekin), Helga Pilarczyk (Composer) | John Pritchard | Revival of 1954 production | |
| 1959 | Der Rosenkavalier | Strauss | Régine Crespin (Feldmarschallin), Elisabeth Söderström (Oktavian), Anneliese Rothenberger (Sophie), Oscar Czerwenka (Ochs) | Leopold Ludwig | Carl Ebert | Oliver Messel |
| 1959 | Idomeneo | Mozart | Richard Lewis (Idomeneo), William McAlpine (Idamante), Sylvia Stahlman (Ilia), Angela Vercelli (Electra) | John Pritchard/Peter Gellhorn | Revival of 1951 production | |
| 1959 | Così fan tutte | Mozart | Ilva Ligabue (Fiordiligi), Gloria Lane (Dorabella), Juan Oncina (Ferrando), Geraint Evans (Guglielmo), Graziella Sciutti (Despina), Carlos Feller (Don Alfonso) | John Pritchard | Revival of 1954 production | |
| 1959 | Fidelio | Beethoven | Gré Brouwenstijn (Leonore), Richard Lewis (Florestan), Kim Borg (Pizarro), Mihály Székely (Rocco) | Vittorio Gui | Günther Rennert | Ita Maximowna |
| 1959 | La Cenerentola | Rossini | Teresa Berganza/Anna Maria Rota (Cenerentola), Juan Oncina (Ramiro), Sesto Bruscantini (Dandini), Ian Wallace (Don Magnifico) | Vittorio Gui/Peter Gellhorn | Revival of 1952 production | |
| 1959 | The Marriage of Figaro | Mozart | Carlos Feller/Geraint Evans (Figaro), Elisabeth Söderström (Susanna), Michel Roux (Count), Pilar Lorengar (Countess), Josephine Veasey (Cherubino) | Peter Maag | Revival of 1955 production | |
| 1960 | I Puritani | Bellini | Joan Sutherland (Elvira), Nicola Filacuridi (Arturo), Ernest Blanc (Riccardo), Giuseppe Modesti (Giorgio) | Vittorio Gui/Bryan Balkwill | Franco Enriquez | Desmond Heeley |
| 1960 | Falstaff | Verdi | Geraint Evans (Falstaff), Ilva Ligabue (Alice), Sesto Bruscantini (Ford), Oralia Dominguez (Mistress Quickly), Mariella Adani (Nannetta), Juan Oncina (Fenton) | Vittorio Gui | Revival of 1955 production | |
| 1960 | Der Rosenkavalier | Strauss | Régine Crespin (Feldmarschallin), Regina Sarfaty (Oktavian), Anneliese Rothenberger (Sophie), Oscar Czerwenka (Ochs) | Leopold Ludwig | Revival of 1959 production | |
| 1960 | Don Giovanni | Mozart | Ernest Blanc (Don Giovanni), Joan Sutherland (Donna Anna), Ilva Ligabue (Donna Elvira), Geraint Evans/Sesto Bruscantini (Leporello), Richard Lewis (Don Ottavio) | John Pritchard/Peter Gellhorn | Günther Rennert | Ita Maximowna |
| 1960 | The Magic Flute | Mozart | Richard Lewis (Tamino), Pilar Lorengar (Pamina), Geraint Evans (Papageno), Mihály Székely (Sarastro), Margareta Hallin (Queen of the Night) | Colin Davis | Revival of 1956 production | |
| 1960 | La Cenerentola | Rossini | Anna Maria Rota (Cenerentola), Juan Oncina (Ramiro), Sesto Bruscantini (Dandini), Ian Wallace (Don Magnifico) | John Pritchard/Peter Gellhorn | Revival of 1952 production | |
| 1960 | Il segreto di Susanna | Wolf-Ferrari | Mariella Adani (Countess), Sesto Bruscantini (Gil) | John Pritchard | Revival of 1958 production | |
| 1960 | La voix humaine | Poulenc | Denise Duval (Elle) | John Pritchard | Jean Cocteau | Jean Cocteau |
| 1960 | Arlecchino | Busoni | Heinz Blankenburg (Arlecchino), Ian Wallace (Ser Matteo), Gwyn Griffiths (Abbate), Carlos Feller (Dottore), Dermot Troy (Leandro), Helga Pilarczyk (Colombina) | John Pritchard | Revival of 1954 production | |
| 1961 | L'elisir d'amore | Donizetti | Luigi Alva (Nemorino), Eugenia Ratti (Adina), Carlo Badioli (Dulcamara), Enzo Sordello (Belcore) | Carlo Felice Cillario | Franco Zeffirelli | Franco Zeffirelli |
| 1961 | Die Entführung aus dem Serail | Mozart | Mattiwilda Dobbs (Constanze), Heinz Hoppe (Belmonte), Mihály Székely/Michael Langdon (Osmin), Dorit Hanak (Blonde), Duncan Robertson (Pedrillo) | Peter Gellhorn | Peter Ebert | Oliver Messel |
| 1961 | Fidelio | Beethoven | Gré Brouwenstijn (Leonore), Richard Lewis (Florestan), Herbert Fliether (Pizarro), Mihály Székely (Rocco) | Vittorio Gui | Revival of 1959 production | |
| 1961 | Elegy for Young Lovers | Henze | Carlos Alexander (Mittenhofer), André Turp (Toni), Elisabeth Söderström (Elizabeth) | Kerstin Meyer (Carolina) John Pritchard/Hans Werner Henze | Günther Rennert | Lila De Nobili |
| 1961 | Don Giovanni | Mozart | György Melis (Don Giovanni), Gerda Scheyrer (Donna Anna), Ilva Ligabue (Donna Elvira), Geraint Evans (Leporello), Richard Lewis (Don Ottavio) | John Pritchard/Peter Gellhorn | Revival of 1960 production | |
| 1961 | The Barber of Seville | Rossini | Sesto Bruscantini (Figaro), Alberta Valentini (Rosina), Juan Oncina (Almaviva), Ian Wallace (Bartolo), Carlo Cava (Basilio) | Vittorio Gui | Revival of 1954 production | |
| 1962 | Pelléas et Mélisande | Debussy | Henri Gui (Pelléas), Denise Duval (Mélisande), Michel Roux (Golaud) | Vittorio Gui | Carl Ebert | Beni Montresor |
| 1962 | The Marriage of Figaro | Mozart | Heinz Blankenburg (Figaro), Mirella Freni (Susanna), Gabriel Bacquier (Count), Leyla Gencer (Countess), Edith Mathis/Maureen Keetch (Cherubino) | Silvio Varviso/John Pritchard | Revival of 1955 production | |
| 1962 | Così fan tutte | Mozart | Antigone Sgourda (Fiordiligi), Stafania Malagù (Dorabella), Loren Driscoll (Ferrando), Ingvar Wixell (Guglielmo), Reri Grist (Despina), Michel Roux (Don Alfonso) | John Pritchard | Carl Ebert | Rolf Gérard/Bernard Nevill |
| 1962 | L'incoronazione di Poppea | Monteverdi | Magda Laszlo (Poppea), Richard Lewis (Nerone), Frances Bible (Ottavia), Walter Alberti (Ottone), Lydia Marimpietri (Drusilla), Carlo Cava (Seneca) | John Pritchard | Günther Rennert | Hugh Casson/Conwy Evans |
| 1962 | Ariadne auf Naxos | Strauss | Enriqueta Tarrés (Ariadne), Gianna d'Angelo/Reri Grist (Zerbinetta), Richard Lewis/William McAlpine (Bacchus), Heinz Blankenburg (Harlekin) | Silvio Varviso | Revival of 1950 production | |
| 1962 | L'elisir d'amore | Donizetti | Luigi Alva (Nemorino), Mirella Freni (Adina), Sesto Bruscantini (Dulcamara), Enzo Sordello (Belcore) | Carlo Felice Cillario | Revival of 1961 production | |
| 1963 | Capriccio | Strauss | Elisabeth Söderström (Countess), Horst Wilhelm (Flamand), Raymond Wolansky (Olivier), Benno Kusche (La Roche), Tom Krause (Count), Soňa Červená (Clairon) | John Pritchard/Bryan Balkwill | Günther Rennert | Dennis Lennon/Anthony Powell |
| 1963 | Fidelio | Beethoven | Gré Brouwenstijn (Leonore), Richard Lewis (Florestan), Herbert Fliether (Pizarro), Victor de Narké (Rocco) | Bryan Balkwill | Revival of 1959 production | |
| 1963 | Pelléas et Mélisande | Debussy | Hans Wilbrink (Pelléas), Denise Duval (Mélisande), Michel Roux (Golaud) | Vittorio Gui | Revival of 1962 production | |
| 1963 | The Marriage of Figaro | Mozart | Heinz Blankenburg (Figaro), Liliane Berton (Susanna), Michel Roux (Count), Leyla Gencer (Countess), Edith Mathis (Cherubino) | Silvio Varviso/Myer Fredman | Revival of 1955 production | |
| 1963 | The Rake's Progress | Stravinsky | Richard Lewis (Tom Rakewell), Heather Harper (Anne), Delme Bryn Jones/Hermann Uhde (Nick Shadow), Gloria Lane (Baba the Turk) | Paul Sacher | Revival of 1953 production | |
| 1963 | L'incoronazione di Poppea | Monteverdi | Magda Laszlo (Poppea), Richard Lewis (Nerone), Frances Bible (Ottavia), Walter Alberti (Ottone), Lydia Marimpietri (Drusilla), Carlo Cava (Seneca) | John Pritchard | Revival of 1962 production | |
| 1963 | The Magic Flute | Mozart | Ragnar Ulfung (Tamino), Judith Raskin (Pamina), Heinz Blankenberg (Papageno), Carlo Cava (Sarastro), Claudine Arnaud (Queen of the Night) | Vittorio Gui | Franco Enriquez | Emanuele Luzzati |

== Sources ==
- Hughes, Spike (1963). Glyndebourne, a history of the Festival Opera. London: Methuen.
- Norwich, John Julius (1985). Fifty Years of Glyndebourne. London: Jonathan Cape. ISBN 0-224-02310-1.

== See also ==
- Glyndebourne Festival Opera: history and repertoire, 1934–1951
