= Opera at the Edinburgh International Festival: history and repertoire, 1947–1956 =

Opera was an important feature of the Edinburgh International Festival from its inception.

All the early productions were at the King's Theatre, a variety touring house with a capacity of 1,350 seats, which had hosted the Carl Rosa Opera and the D'Oyly Carte Opera Company. Edinburgh did not have an opera house, and only limited creative resources to originate productions, in a way that was possible at festivals such as Salzburg from the 1960s onwards.

The Glyndebourne Festival Opera was an key partner who brought two productions to the festival each year from 1947 to 1951. In 1952, their place was taken by the Hamburg State Opera who brought six productions that year. However, in 1953, 1954 and 1955 Glyndebourne returned each time with three productions. Hamburg State Opera made their second visit in 1956, this time with five productions.

== 1947 (two productions) ==
Orchestra, Choir, Conductor	Director, Set Designer	Female singer	Male singer
Glyndebourne Opera production of Macbeth by Giuseppe Verdi, August 25, 27, 29, and September 2, 4, 6, 8, 10, 12 1947 (nine performances) at the Kings Theatre
The Scottish Orchestra; Glyndebourne Festival Chorus; Georg Szell	Carl Ebert; Caspar Neher settings	Margherita Grandi Lady Macbeth	Francesco Valentino Macbeth; Italo Tajo Banquo; Owen Brannigan Banquo; Walter Midgley Macduff; Andrew McKinley Malcolm
Glyndebourne Opera production of Le nozze di Figaro by Lorenzo Da Ponte and Wolfgang Amadeus Mozart, August 26, 28, 30, September 1, 3, 5, 9, 11, 13 1947 (nine performances) at the Kings Theatre
The Scottish Orchestra; Glyndebourne Festival Chorus; Georg Szell	Carl Ebert; Hamish Wilson and Ann Litherland settings	Eleanor Steber Countess Almaviva; Virginia MacWatters Susanne; Catherine Lawson Marcellina; Jarmila Novotna Cherubino	John Brownlee Count Almaviva; Italo Tajo Figaro; Bruce Flegg Basilio; Owen Brannigan Bartolo

== 1948 (two productions) ==
Orchestra, Choir, Conductor	Director, Set Designer	Female singer	Male singer
Glyndebourne Opera production of Don Giovanni by Wolfgang Amadeus Mozart, August 23, 25, 27, 31, and September 2, 4, 6, 8, 10, 1948 (nine performances) at the Kings Theatre
Royal Philharmonic Orchestra; Glyndebourne Festival Chorus; Rafael Kubelik	Carl Ebert; Hamish Wilson design Hein Heckroth costumes	Ljuba Welitsch Donna Anna; Christina Carroll Donna Elvira; Ann Ayars Zerlina	Vito de Taranto Leporello; Paolo Silveri Don Giovanni; David Franklin Commendatore; Richard Lewis Don Ottavio; Ian Wallace Masetto
Glyndebourne Opera production of Così fan tutte by Lorenzo Da Ponte and Wolfgang Amadeus Mozart, August 24, 26, 28, 30, and September 1, 3, 7, 9, 11 1948 (nine performances) at the Kings Theatre
Royal Philharmonic Orchestra; Glyndebourne Festival Chorus; Vittorio Gui	Carl Ebert; Rolf Gérard settings	Suzanne Danco Fiordiligi; Eugenia Zareska Dorabella; Hilde Güden Despina	Petre Munteanu Ferrando; Erich Kunz Guglielmo; Mariano Stabile Don Alfonso

== 1949 (two productions) ==
Orchestra, Choir, Conductor	Director, Set Designer	Female singer	Male singer
Glyndebourne Opera production of Un ballo in maschera by Giuseppe Verdi, August 22, 24, 26, 29, 31 and September 1, 3, 5, 6, 8, 10 1949 (11 performances) at the Kings Theatre
Royal Philharmonic Orchestra; Glyndebourne Festival Chorus; Vittorio Gui	Carl Ebert; Caspar Neher settings	Ljuba Welitsch Amelia; Margherita Grandi Amelia; Alda Noni Oscar; Jean Watson Ulrica	Mirto Picchi Riccardo; William Horne Riccardo; Paolo Silveri Renato; Ian Wallace Samuelo; Hervey Allan Tommaso; Francis Loring Silvano; George Israel Judge
Glyndebourne Opera production of Così fan tutte by Lorenzo Da Ponte and Wolfgang Amadeus Mozart, August 23, 25, 27, 30, and September 2, 7, 9 1949 (seven performances) at the Kings Theatre
Royal Philharmonic Orchestra; Glyndebourne Festival Chorus; Vittorio Gui	Carl Ebert; Rolf Gérard settings	Suzanne Danco Fiordiligi; Sena Jurinac Dorabella; Irene Eisinger Despina	Petre Munteanu Ferrando; Marko Rothmuller Guglielmo; John Brownlee Don Alfonso

== 1950 (two productions) ==
Orchestra, Choir, Conductor	Director, Set Designer	Female singer	Male singer
Glyndebourne Opera production of Ariadne auf Naxos by Richard Strauss, preceded by a shortened version of Molière's Le Bourgeois gentilhomme, August 21, 23, 25, 29, 31 and September 2, 4, 6, 8 1950 (nine performances) at the Kings Theatre
Royal Philharmonic Orchestra; Glyndebourne Festival Chorus; Sir Thomas Beecham	Carl Ebert; Oliver Messel settings	Hilde Zadek Ariadne; Ilse Hollweg Zerbinetta; Dorothy Bond Najade; Marjorie Thomas Dryade; April Cantelo Echo	Peter Anders Bacchus; Douglas Craig Harlekin; Murray Dickie Brighella; Alexander Young Scaramuccio; Bruce Dargavel Truffaldin
Glyndebourne Opera production of Le nozze di Figaro by Lorenzo Da Ponte and Wolfgang Amadeus Mozart, August 22, 24, 26, 28, 30 September 1, 5, 7, 9 1950 (nine performances) at the Kings Theatre
Royal Philharmonic Orchestra; Glyndebourne Festival Chorus; Ferenc Fricsay	Carl Ebert; Rolf Gérard settings	Clara Ebers Countess Almaviva; Elfride Troetschel Susanne; Jean Watson Marcellina; Sena Jurinac Cherubino; April Cantelo Barbarina	Marko Rothmüller Count Almaviva; George London Figaro; Murray Dickie Basilio; Ian Wallace Bartolo

== 1951 (two productions) ==
Orchestra, Choir, Conductor	Director, Set Designer	Female singer	Male singer
Glyndebourne Opera production of La forza del destino by Giuseppe Verdi, August 20, 22, 24, 28, 30 and September 1, 3, 5, 7 1951 (nine performances) at the Kings Theatre
Royal Philharmonic Orchestra; Glyndebourne Festival Chorus; Fritz Busch	Carl Ebert; Leslie Hurry settings	Walburga Wegner Leonora; Mildred Miller Preziosilla; Alda Noni Oscar; Jean Watson Ulrica	David Poleri Don Alvaro; Marko Rothmüller Don Carlo; Bruce Dargavel Padre Guardiano; Owen Brannigan Fra Melitone
Glyndebourne Opera production of Don Giovanni by Lorenzo Da Ponte and Wolfgang Amadeus Mozart, August 21, 23, 25, 27, 29, 31 and September 4, 6, 8 1951 (nine performances) at the Kings Theatre
Royal Philharmonic Orchestra; Glyndebourne Festival Chorus; Fritz Busch / John Pritchard	Carl Ebert; John Piper settings	Hilde Zadek Donna Anna; Dorothy MacNeil Donna Elvira; Suzanne Danco Donna Elvira; Genevieve Warner Zerlina; Pierrette Alarie Zerlina; Roxane Houston Zerlina	Mario Petri Don Giovanni; Alois Pernerstorfer / Owen Brannigan Leporello; Léopold Simoneau Don Ottavio; Geraint Evans Masetto

== 1952 (six productions) ==
Orchestra, Choir, Conductor	Director, Set Designer	Female singer	Male singer
Hamburg State Opera production of Fidelio by Ludwig van Beethoven, August 18, 20 and September 1, 4 1952 (four performances) at the Kings Theatre
Hamburg Philharmonic Orchestra; Hamburg State Opera Chorus; Leopold Ludwig	Günther Rennert; Alfred Siercke settings	Inge Borkh Leonore; Martha Mödl Leonore; Lisa della Casa Marzelline	Caspar Bröcheler Don Fernando; Josef Metternich Don Pizarro; Peter Anders Florestan; Theo Herrmann Rocco; Kurt Marschner Jacquino
Hamburg State Opera production of Der Freischütz by Carl Maria von Weber, August 22, 25, 27 1952 (three performances) at the Kings Theatre
Hamburg Philharmonic Orchestra; Hamburg State Opera Chorus; Josef Keilberth	Günther Rennert; Caspar Neher settings	Elisabeth Grümmer Agathe; Clara Ebers Agathe; Anneliese Rothenberger Annchen	Georg Mund Ottakar; Toni Blankenheim Kuno; Gottlob Frick Kaspar / Eremit; Caspar Bröcheler Kaspar; Peter Anders Max; Kurt Marschner Kilian; Theo Herrmann Eremit; Wolfgang Rottsieper Samiel
Hamburg State Opera production of Die Zauberflöte by Wolfgang Amadeus Mozart, August 19, 21, 23, 26 1952 (four performances) at the Kings Theatre
Hamburg Philharmonic Orchestra; Hamburg State Opera Chorus; Georg Solti	Günther Rennert; Alfred Siercke settings	Valerie Bak Queen of the Night; Elisabeth Grümmer Pamina; Lisa della Casa Pamina; Anneliese Rothenberger Papagena; Lisa Jungkind First lady Ilse Koegel Second lady Maria von Ilosvay Third lady	Gottlob Frick Sarastro; Rudolf Schock Tamino; Josef Metternich Sprecher; Horst Günther Papageno; Kurt Marschner Monostatos; Helmuth Melchert First armed man Jean Wilhelm Pfendt Second armed man
Hamburg State Opera production of Der Rosenkavalier by Richard Strauss, August 28, 30 and September 5, 1952 (three performances) at the Kings Theatre
Hamburg Philharmonic Orchestra; Hamburg State Opera Chorus; Joseph Keilberth / Leopold Ludwig	Günther Rennert; Alfred Siercke settings	Clara Ebers Marschallin; Martha Mödl Octavian; Lisa della Casa Sophie; Hedy Gura Annina	Theo Herrmann Ochs; Caspar Bröcheler Faninal; Fritz Göllnitz Valzacchi; Rudolf Schock Singer; Fritz Lehnert Singer
Hamburg State Opera production of Mathis der Maler by Paul Hindemith, August 29 and September 2, 1952 (two performances) at the Kings Theatre
Hamburg Philharmonic Orchestra; Hamburg State Opera Chorus; Leopold Ludwig	Günther Rennert; Helmuth Jürgens, Alfred Siercke settings	Elfriede Wasserthal Ursula; Anneliese Rothenberger Regina; Lisa Jungkind Gräfin Helfenstein	Helmuth Melchert Albrecht; Mathieu Ahlersmeyer Mathis; Toni Blankenheim Lorenz; Fritz Lehnert Wolgang Capito; Theo Herrmann Riedinger; Heinrich Bensing Hans Schwalb; Jean Wilhelm Pfendt Truchsess von Waldburg; Kurt Marschner Sylvester
Hamburg State Opera production of Die Meistersinger by Richard Wagner, September 3, 6 1952 (two performances) at the Kings Theatre
Hamburg Philharmonic Orchestra; Hamburg State Opera Chorus; Leopold Ludwig	Günther Rennert; Helmuth Jürgens, Rosemarie Jakameit settings	Elisabeth Grümmer Eva; Gisela Litz Magdalena	Otto Edelmann Hans Sachs; Gottlob Frick Pogner; Fritz Lehnert Vogelsang; Martin Schramm Nachtigall; Toni Blankenheim Beckmesser; Caspar Bröcheler Kothner; Erich Zimmermann Zorn; Peter Konig Eisslinger; Robert Bodewig Moser; Karl Otto Ortel; Jean Wilhelm Pfendt Schwarz; Joseph Vetter Foltz; Peter Anders Walther; Kurt Marschner David; Horst Wegner Nightwatchman

== 1953 (three productions) ==
Orchestra, Choir, Conductor	Director, Set Designer	Female singer	Male singer
Glyndebourne Opera production of La Cenerentola by Gioachino Rossini, August 24, 26, 28, 31 and September 8, 10, 12 1953 (seven performances) at the Kings Theatre
Royal Philharmonic Orchestra; Glyndebourne Festival Chorus; Vittorio Gui, John Pritchard	Carl Ebert; Oliver Messel settings	Alda Noni Clorinda; Fernanda Cadoni Tisbe; Marina de Gabarain Angelina	Hervey Allan Alidoro; Ian Wallace Don Magnifico; Juan Onchina Don Ramiro; Sesto Bruscantini Dandini
Glyndebourne Opera production of The Rake's Progress by Igor Stravinsky, August 25, 27, 29, September 2, 4 1953 (five performances) at the Kings Theatre
Royal Philharmonic Orchestra; Glyndebourne Festival Chorus; Alfred Wallenstein	Carl Ebert; Osbert Lancaster settings	Elsie Morison Ann; Mary Jarred Mother Goose; Nan Merriman Baba the Turk	David Lloyd Tom Rakewell; Hervey Allan Truelove; Jerome Hines Nick Shadow; Murray Dickie Sellem; Dennis Wicks Keeper of the madhouse
Glyndebourne Opera production of Idomeneo by Wolfgang Amadeus Mozart, September 1, 3, 5, 7, 9, 11 1953 (six performances) at the Kings Theatre
Royal Philharmonic Orchestra; Glyndebourne Festival Chorus; John Pritchard	Carl Ebert; Rolf Gérard settings	Sena Jurinac Ilia; Jennifer Vyvyan Electra	Helmut Krebs Idamante; John Cameron Arbace; Richard Lewis Idomeneo; John Carolan High Priest; Hervey Allan Voice of Neptune

== 1954 (three productions) ==
Orchestra, Choir, Conductor	Director, Set Designer	Female singer	Male singer
Glyndebourne Opera production of Le Comte Ory by Gioachino Rossini, August 23, 25, 27, 30 and September 1, 4, 7 1954 (seven performances) at the Kings Theatre
Royal Philharmonic Orchestra; Glyndebourne Festival Chorus; Vittorio Gui	Carl Ebert; Oliver Messel settings	Halina de Tarczynska Alice; Monica Sinclair Ragonde; Fernanda Cadoni Isolier; Sári Barabás Countess Adèle	Sesto Bruscantini Raimbaud; Juan Oncina Count Ory; Ian Wallace Tutor; Dermot Troy Cavalier
Glyndebourne Opera production of Ariadne auf Naxos by Richard Strauss, August 24, 26, 28, September 3, 8, 10 1954 (seven performances) at the Kings Theatre
Royal Philharmonic Orchestra; Glyndebourne Festival Chorus; John Pritchard	Carl Ebert; Oliver Messel settings	Sena Jurinac Composer; Mattiwilda Dobbs Zerbinetta; Lucine Amara Ariadne; Maureen Springer Naiade; Noreen Berry Dryade; Elaine Malbin Echo	David Franklin Major Domo; Geraint Evans Music master Richard Lewis Bacchus; John Carolan Officer; Murray Dickie Dancing master, Brighella; Gwyn Griffiths Wig-maker; James Atkins Lackey; Kurt Gester Harlekin; Juan Oncina Scaramucchio; Fritz Ollendorff Truffaldin
Glyndebourne Opera production of Cosi fan tutte by Wolfgang Amadeus Mozart, August 31, September 2, 6, 9, 11 1954 (five performances) at the Kings Theatre
Royal Philharmonic Orchestra; Glyndebourne Festival Chorus; Vittorio Gui, John Pritchard	Carl Ebert; Rolf Gérard, Rosemary Vercoe settings	Sena Jurinac Fiordiligi; Magda Laszlo Dorabella; Alda Noni Despina	Richard Lewis Ferrando; Juan Oncina Ferrando; Geraint Evans Guglielmo; Sesto Bruscantini Don Alfonso

== 1955 (three productions) ==
Orchestra, Choir, Conductor	Director, Set Designer	Female singer	Male singer
Glyndebourne Opera production of Il barbiere di Siviglia by Gioachino Rossini, August 22, 24, 26, 31 and September 6, 9 1955 (six performances) at the Kings Theatre
Royal Philharmonic Orchestra; Glyndebourne Festival Chorus; Alberto Erede	Carl Ebert; Oliver Messel settings	Gianna D'Angelo Rosina; Monica Sinclair Berta	Gwyn Griffiths Fiorello; Juan Oncina Conte; Sesto Bruscantini Figaro; Ian Wallace Bartolo; Harold Williams Ambrogio; Cristiano Dalamangas Basilio; David Kelly Officer; Daniel McCoshan Notary
Glyndebourne Opera production of Falstaff by Giuseppe Verdi, August 23, 25, 27, 29, September 2, 7 1955 (six performances) at the Kings Theatre
Royal Philharmonic Orchestra; Glyndebourne Festival Chorus; Carlo Maria Giulini	Carl Ebert; Osbert Lancaster settings	Fernanda Cadoni Mistress Page; Anna Maria Rovere Mistress Ford; Oralia Domínguez Mistress Quickly; Eugenia Ratti Nanetta	Fernando Corena Falstaff; Dermot Troy Caius; Daniel McCoshan Bardolph; Marco Stefanoni Pistol; Juan Oncina Fenton; Geraint Evans Ford
Glyndebourne Opera production of La forza del destino by Giuseppe Verdi, August 30, September 1, 3, 5, 8, 10 1955 (six performances) at the Kings Theatre
Royal Philharmonic Orchestra; Glyndebourne Festival Chorus; John Pritchard	Peter Ebert; Leslie Hurry settings	Sena Jurinac Donna Leonora; Marina de Gabarain Preziosilla; Monica Sinclair Curra	David Kelly Calatrava; Marko Rothmüller Don Carlo; David Poleri Don Alvaro; Hervey Allan Padre Guardiano; Ian Wallace Fra Melitone

== 1956 (four productions) ==
Orchestra, Choir, Conductor	Director, Set Designer	Female singer	Male singer
Hamburg State Opera production of Die Zauberflöte by Wolfgang Amadeus Mozart, August 20, 22, 24, 29, 31 and September 3, 1956 (six performances) at the Kings Theatre
Hamburg Philharmonic Orchestra; Hamburg State Opera Chorus; Rudolf Kempe, Leopold Ludwig	Günther Rennert; Ita Maximovna settings	Colette Lorand Queen of the Night; Anny Schlemm Pamina; Elisabeth Grümmer Pamina; Anneliese Rothenberger Papagena; Erna Maria Duske Papagena	Rudolf Schock Tamino; Heinz HoppeTamino; Horst Günther Papageno; Kurt Marschner Monostatos; James Pease Speaker; Arnold van Mill Sarastro; Peter Markwort First Priest
Hamburg State Opera production of Oedipus Rex and Mavra by Igor Stravinsky, August 21, 28 and September 5, 1956 (three performances) at the Kings Theatre
Hamburg Philharmonic Orchestra; Hamburg State Opera Chorus; Leopold Ludwig	Günther Rennert; Teo Otto settings	Maria von Ilosvay Jocasta Melitta Muszely Parasha; Gisela Litz Mother; Margarete Ast Neighbour	Helmut Melchert Oedipus; James Pease Creon; Arnold van Mill Tiresias; Fritz Lehnert Shepherd; Caspar Bröcheler Messenger Jürgen Förster Hussar
Hamburg State Opera production of Der Barbier von Bagdad by Peter Cornelius, August 23, 25 and September 7, 1956 (three performances) at the Kings Theatre
Hamburg Philharmonic Orchestra; Hamburg State Opera Chorus; Albert Bittner	Günther Rennert; Alfred Siercke settings	Melitta Muszely Margiana; Gisela Litz Bostana	Georg Mund Caliph; Kurt Marschner Baba Mustapha; Sándor Kónya Nureddin; Heinz Hoppe Nureddin; Arnold van Mill Abdul Hassan; Jürgen Förster Slave
Hamburg State Opera production of Salome by Richard Strauss, August 30 and September 1, 4, 6, 8 September 1956 (five performances) at the Kings Theatre
Hamburg Philharmonic Orchestra; Hamburg State Opera Chorus; Leopold Ludwig	Wolf Völker; Alfred Siercke settings	Christel Goltz Salome; Helga Pilarczyk Salome; Siw Ericsdotter Herodias; Margarete Ast Page	Fritz Lehnert Narraboth; Horst Günter First Soldier; Jean Pfendt Second Soldier; Caspar Bröcheler Jokanaan; Josef Metternich Jokanaan; Georg Mund Cappadocian; Werner Hecker Slave; Helmut Melchert Herod; Peter Markwort Herod; Kurt Marschner First Jew; Jürgen Förster Second Jew; Hans Böhm Third Jew; Victor GawlitzerFourth Jew; Karl Otto Fifth Jew; Arnold van Mill First Nazarene; Erich Zimmermann Second Nazarene

== See also ==
- Edinburgh International Festival
- Opera at the Edinburgh International Festival: history and repertoire, 1957–1966
- Opera at the Edinburgh International Festival: history and repertoire, 1967–1976
- Drama at the Edinburgh International Festival: history and repertoire, 1947–1956
- Drama at the Edinburgh International Festival: history and repertoire, 1957–1966
- Drama at the Edinburgh International Festival: history and repertoire, 1967–1976
- Ballet at the Edinburgh International Festival: history and repertoire, 1947–1956
- Ballet at the Edinburgh International Festival: history and repertoire, 1957–1966
- Ballet at the Edinburgh International Festival: history and repertoire, 1967–1976
- Musicians at the Edinburgh International Festival, 1947–1956
- Musicians at the Edinburgh International Festival, 1957–1966
- Musicians at the Edinburgh International Festival, 1967–1976
- Visual Arts at the Edinburgh International Festival, 1947–1976
- World premieres at the Edinburgh International Festival
- Edinburgh Festival Fringe
- List of Edinburgh festivals
- List of opera festivals
