= Martha (opera) =

Romantic comic opera by Friedrich von Flotow

- Romantisch-komische Oper by Friedrich von Flotow
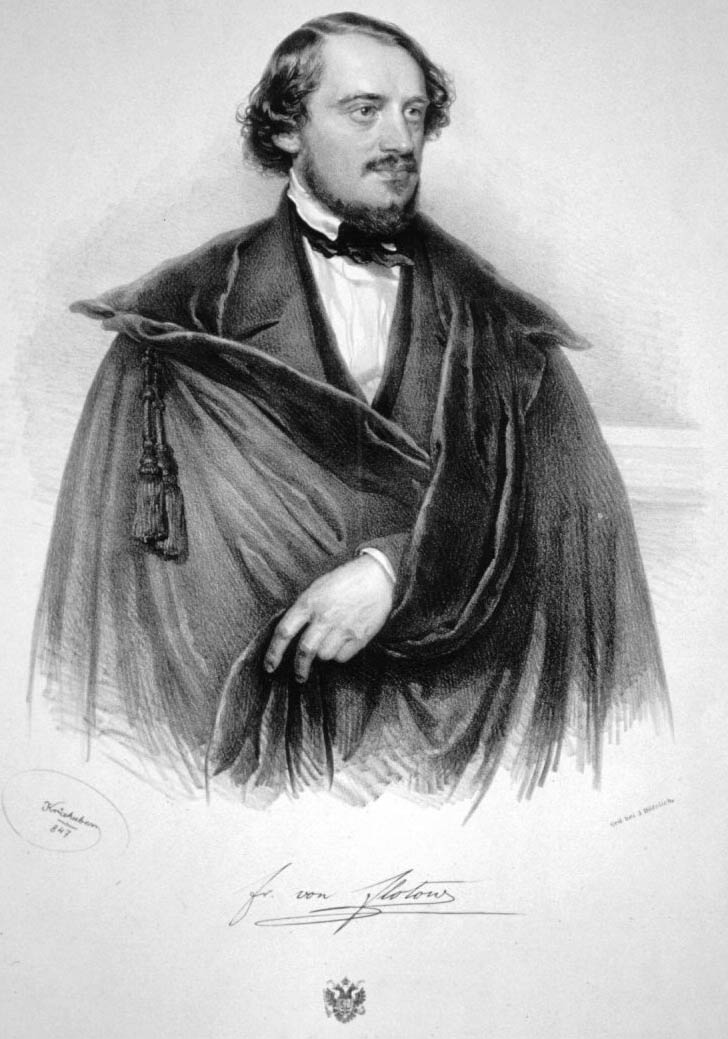
- The composer in 1847
- Librettist: Friedrich Wilhelm Riese
- Language: German
- Based on: story by Jules-Henri Vernoy de Saint-Georges
- Premiere: 25 November 1847; Kärntnertortheater, Vienna

Martha, oder Der Markt zu Richmond (Martha, or The Market at Richmond) is a romantic comic opera in four acts by Friedrich von Flotow set to a German libretto by Friedrich Wilhelm Riese and based on a story by Jules-Henri Vernoy de Saint-Georges.

Flotow had composed the first act of a ballet, Harriette, ou la servante de Greenwiche, derived from a text by Saint-Georges, for the ballerina Adèle Dumilâtre. This was first performed by the Paris Opera Ballet at the Salle Le Peletier on 21 February 1844. The time available for the composition was short, so the second and third acts were assigned, respectively, to Friedrich Burgmüller and Édouard Deldevez. The opera Martha was an adaptation of this ballet.

== Critical appreciation ==
According to Gustav Kobbé, Martha, though written by a native of Mecklenburg and first performed in Vienna, is French in character and elegance. Flotow was French in his musical training, as were the origins of both the plot and the score of this work, effectively in the tradition of Auber. (Flotow studied composition in Paris under Reicha from 1827 until 1830, and having left on account of the July Revolution returned there from 1835 until 1848, and again from 1863 until 1868.)

== Performance history ==
The first performance of Martha took place at the Kärntnertortheater in Vienna on 25 November 1847. Other early productions followed in Weimar (16 February 1848), Dresden (1 March 1848), Leipzig (1 March 1848), and Berlin (7 March 1848). It was performed in Budapest in Hungarian (11 July 1848) and in Prague in German (24 March 1849) and in Czech (17 February 1850). There were several early productions in London, the first in German at Drury Lane (4 June 1849), followed by one in Italian at Covent Garden (1 July 1858) and another in English at Drury Lane (11 October 1858).

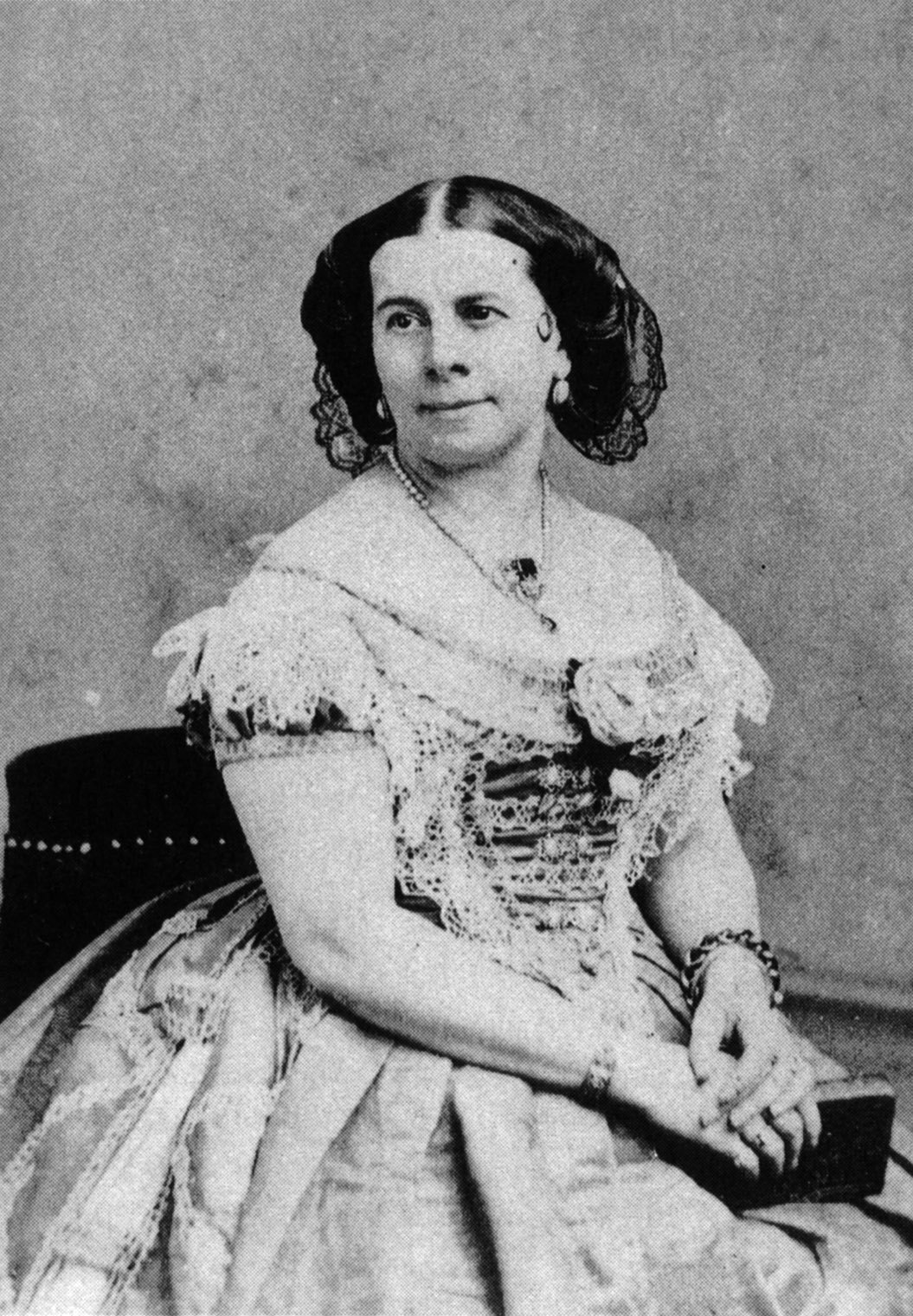
Anna Bishop

In the United States, it was produced in English at Niblo's Garden in New York City on 1 November 1852 with Anna Bishop, in New Orleans on 27 January 1860, in French. It had its first Australian performance in Melbourne on 24 June 1856. The opera was performed at the second inauguration of Abraham Lincoln in 1865.

It was first performed in France in Italian by the Théâtre-Italien at the Salle Ventadour in Paris on 11 February 1858 and in French at several provincial theatres beginning in December 1858 and at the Théâtre Lyrique in Paris on 18 December 1865. According to T. J. Walsh, numerous editions of Kobbé's Opera Book have incorrectly given the date of the first performance at the Théâtre Lyrique as 16 December 1865. He also challenges Kobbé's statement that the aria "M'appari" (which Flotow composed for his earlier opera L'âme en peine) was first introduced into the opera Martha at that theatre. He notes that it was sung by Mario at the Théâtre-Italien in 1858 and is also found (as "Ach! so fromm") in an early (probably 1848) Vienna edition of the score in the British Library and was probably always a part of the opera. The confusion may have arisen from further alterations made by the Théâtre Lyrique's director, Léon Carvalho, which included the insertion in act 4 of Flotow's baritone aria "Depuis le jour j'ai paré ma chaumière" (also from L'âme en peine).

In 1877, at the Royal Italian Opera in Covent Garden, Victor Capoul performed as Lyonel, with Francesco Graziani (baritone) as Plunkett and Sofia Scalchi as Nancy.

Martha received a fresh boost in popularity in 1906 when it was staged at the Metropolitan Opera in New York in a production that featured the famed tenor Enrico Caruso, singing the opera in Italian. Lyonel was one of Caruso's most popular roles, performing it many times during subsequent seasons; he also recorded several extracts from the Italian version of the opera. Martha fell out of favor by the 1920s and it was rarely performed for decades thereafter. Interest in the opera was rekindled by the 1980s and recent productions in the United Kingdom have included those by Opera South in 1986 and 2009 and Bel Canto Opera in 2002. Those in the U.S. have included Michigan Opera Theatre in 1985.

== Roles ==
Roles, voice types, premiere cast
Role	Voice type	Premiere cast, 25 November 1847
Lady Harriet Durham, maid of honor to Queen Anne ('Martha')	soprano	Anna Zerr
Nancy, her servant ('Julia')	mezzo-soprano	Therese Schwarz
Plunkett, a young farmer	bass	Karl Johann Formes
Lyonel, his foster brother	tenor	Joseph Erl
Sir Tristan Mickleford, Lady Harriet's cousin (Farmer Bob)	bass	Carl Just
Sheriff	bass	Alois Ander
Chorus: Courtiers, pages, ladies, hunters, farmers

== Synopsis ==
Time: 1710.
Place: Richmond, England.

=== Act 1 ===
Lady Harriet Durham, a maid-of-honour to Queen Anne, is so tired of Court life, and so sick of her many insipid admirers, she retires to the country. But she becomes bored so she decides to attend the fair at Richmond where girls hire themselves out as servants. For a laugh, she and her confidante Nancy masquerade as maidservants. Her foppish old cousin, Sir Tristan, another admirer whom she deems a bore, accompanies them. Harriet manages to lose her escort, and then she and Nancy stand in the line of girls waiting to be hired. Two young farmers, Lyonel and Plunkett, are looking for a couple of wenches to do their housework and, being struck by the beauty and charm of the two masqueraders, proceed to hire them. Lady Harriet gives her name as Martha. The girls are soon dismayed to find they are legally bound to their new masters for a year. Sir Tristan is unable to retrieve them from their fate.

=== Act 2 ===
Quickly, both farmers fall for their new maidservants — Lyonel for Harriet and Plunkett for Nancy. Harriet feels that Lyonel is of higher station than he appears. He is an orphan who was left with Plunkett's parents in early childhood. The new maids are totally inept at their tasks, which infuriates Plunkett. Finally, the new maids are told to go to bed, but escape through the window, with the aid of Sir Tristan. The young farmers are distressed and angry at the loss of their maids, and Lyonel's grief is so great that he falls into a melancholy state.

=== Act 3 ===
Wandering in the forest, Lyonel meets a royal hunting party and recognises Lady Harriet. He declares his love for her, but she rebuffs him. Lyonel reminds her of her contract to serve him for a year. She tells the party the young man is mad, and Sir Tristan supports her declaration. Orders are given to imprison the young man. Lyonel has a ring his father gave him, saying if he was ever in trouble he was to send the ring to the Queen. He begs his friend to take it to the court.

=== Act 4 ===
The ring saves Lyonel. The Queen recognises it as that of a banished nobleman, whose innocence has since been proven. Lady Harriet is now willing to accept his courtship as there is no longer a class difference to stand between them. She is filled with remorse for the way she has treated him. She reveals to him her true identity and tells him that his estate will be restored but he is blinded by anger with Harriet for the injustice she did him and refuses to accept her love. To win him back, Harriet and Nancy return to the fair once again dressed as country wenches. When Plunkett brings Lyonel to the fair and points out the two pretty serving-maids, Lyonel realises he does love Harriet. He embraces her, and they agree to marry, as do Plunkett and Nancy.

==== Noted arias, duets, ensembles ====
- "Ach! so fromm, ach! so traut (M'apparì tutt'amor)" (Lyonel)
- "Blickt sein Aug" (Harriet and Lyonel)
- "Lasst mich euch fragen (Porter-Lied)" Drinking Song (Plunkett)
- "Letzte Rose (The Last Rose of Summer)" (Qui sola vergin rosa) (Harriet, later with Lyonel)
- "Mag der Himmel Euch vergeben" (Lyonel's Prayer)
- "Schlafe wohl! Und mag Dich reuen" (Good Night Quartet)
- "Was soll ich dazu sagen?" (Spinning-Wheel Quartet)
- "Povero Lionello... Il mio Lionel" (Added by Flotow for baritone Graziani's Plunkett, solely in the Italian version)

== Musical content ==
The Last Rose of Summer
Sung by Adelina Patti in 1906

Ja, seit frühster Kindheit Tagen
Sung by Enrico Caruso in 1910

The overture is among von Flotow's most appreciated works. It begins with a slow A minor introduction, but changes suddenly to an A major theme (that of Lyonel's prayer in act 3, "Mag der Himmel Euch vergeben"), presented as an extended French horn solo with orchestral accompaniment that concludes with the theme stated by the full orchestra. It reverts to A minor with a busy, agitated motif for the Allegro, representing Lady Harriet and Nancy bustling about, leading into the slightly slower (meno moto) C major peasant girls' chorus theme from act 1, played by woodwinds accompanied by triangle and snare drum with pizzicato string punctuation. This concludes with a mini-coda for the full orchestra a tempo in C; then the agitated theme returns, but modulates several times from C through D minor and E minor to a section pitting the agitated theme in F major against Lyonel's prayer in the oboes, clarinets, and cellos in the midst of the orchestral texture, adding winds and brass to the theme in a crescendo until suddenly breaking off and reprising the peasant girls' chorus in A major. That leads without further modulation back to the Lyonel's prayer motif for full orchestra as in the beginning, and so the overture ends with a brisk, very short duple-meter coda. The fluctuations of light and shade are reminiscent of Schubertian scoring, or of Weber (e.g. Der Freischütz overture): but without modulation into remote tonalities, they never really portend a tragic conclusion, but rather the lovers' dilemmas and local color.

Though the powerful overture hints at a darker outcome, the opera ends happily. The heroine's levity and Lyonel's sincerity are its themes. The dramatic music, as between Lyonel and Harriet in act 4, is weighty, while the scoring of the comic scenes is also (but differently) effective. In his own idiom, like Mozart in Don Giovanni or Verdi in Un ballo in maschera, von Flotow could build convivial music into a tragic dramatic context.

The Thomas Moore traditional Irish melody "The Last Rose of Summer", introduced for Martha in act 2, was a successful inclusion. Popular airs were then often introduced informally to operas as show-pieces by sopranos, for example "Home! Sweet Home!" in the lesson scene of The Barber of Seville. Singers such as Jenny Lind or Adelina Patti made much of them. In Martha the custom is formally perpetuated, and the melody then appears as a leitmotif to represent Lyonel's longing.

== Recordings ==
- 1944 Erna Berger (Harriet), Else Tegetthoff (Nancy), Peter Anders (Lyonel), Josef Greindl (Plunkett), Eugen Fuchs (Tristan); Chor der Staatsoper Berlin / Staatskapelle Berlin; Johannes Schüler (conductor) – Berlin Classics
- 1954 Elena Rizzieri (Harriet), Pia Tassinari (Nancy), Ferruccio Tagliavini (Lyonel), Carlo Tagliabue (Plunkett), Bruno Carmassi (Tristan); Orchestra Sinfonica e Coro di Torino della RAI; Francesco Molinari-Pradelli (conductor) – Fonit Cetra (in Italian)
- 1955 Wilma Lipp (Harriet), Hetty Plümacher (Nancy), Waldemar Kmentt (Lyonel), Kurt Böhme (Plunkett), Rudolf Wünzer (Tristan); Chor der Bayerischen Rundfunks / Münchner Rundfunksorchester; Hans Gierster (conductor) – Cantus Classics
- 1956 Teresa Stich-Randall (Harriet), Hilde Rössel-Majdan (Nancy), Waldemar Kmentt (Lyonel), Walter Berry (Plunkett), Hans Braun (Tristan); Chor der Wiener Staatsoper / Wiener Symphoniker; Franz Salmhofer (conductor) – Gala (excerpts)
- 1960 Sonja Schöner (Harriet), Gisela Litz (Nancy), Donald Grobe (Lyonel), Karl-Christian Kohn (Plunkett), Walter Dicks (Tristan); Chor und Orchester des Hamburger Rundfunks; Walter Martin (conductor) – Cantus Classics
- 1960 Anneliese Rothenberger (Harriet), Hetty Plümacher (Nancy), Fritz Wunderlich (Lyonel), Gottlob Frick (Plunkett), Georg Völker (Tristan); Chor der Deutschen Oper Berlin / Berliner Symphoniker; Berislav Klobučar (conductor) – EMI (excerpts)
- 1961 Victoria de los Ángeles (Harriet), Rosalind Elias (Nancy), Richard Tucker (Lyonel), Giorgio Tozzi (Plunkett), Lorenzo Alvary (Tristan); Chorus and Orchestra of the Metropolitan Opera House; Nino Verchi (conductor) – Celestial Audio (live in English)
- 1965 Erika Köth (Harriet), Elisabeth Steiner (Nancy), Rudolf Schock (Lyonel), Walter Kreppel (Plunkett), Manfred Röhrl (Tristan); Der Chor der Deutschen Oper Berlin / Berliner Symphoniker; Wilhelm Schüchter (conductor) – Eurodisc (excerpts)
- 1968 Anneliese Rothenberger (Harriet), Brigitte Fassbaender (Nancy), Nicolai Gedda (Lyonel), Hermann Prey (Plunkett), Dieter Weller (Tristan); Der Chor der Bayerischer Staatsoper München / Der Orchester der Bayerischer Staatsoper München; Robert Heger (conductor) – EMI
- 1977 Lucia Popp (Harriet), Doris Soffel (Nancy), Siegfried Jerusalem (Lyonel), Karl Ridderbusch (Plunkett), Siegmund Nimsgern (Tristan); Chorus of the Bavarian Radio / Munich Radio Orchestra; Heinz Wallberg (conductor) – RCA
- 2016 Maria Bengtsson (Harriet), Katharina Magiera (Nancy), AJ Glueckert (Lyonel), Björn Bürger (Plunkett), Barnaby Rea (Tristan); Chor der Oper Frankfurt / Frankfurter Opern- und Museumsorchester; Sebastian Weigle (conductor) – Oehms (live)
