= Marina de Gabaráin =

Spanish mezzo-soprano

- Born: 1917; San Sebastián (Donostia), Spain
- Died: 13 June 1972 (aged 54–55); Paris, France
- Occupation: Operatic mezzo-soprano

Marina de Gabaráin (1917 (Note: 1917 according to Joaquín Martín de Sagarmínaga, Diccionario de cantantes líricos españoles, Acento Editorial, 1997, p. 151. Other sources give 1925.) – 13 June 1972) was a Spanish mezzo-soprano. Her international career began at Glyndebourne in 1952, where she appeared in Rossini's La Cenerentola as Angelina (Cinderella), which became her signature role.

== Life ==
Born in San Sebastián (Donostia) in 1917, Gabaráin initially trained in Italy with Giuseppe Pais, who also taught Renata Tebaldi. Continuing her studies with Lotte Leonard and Pierre Bernac in Paris, her final training was with Elena Gerhardt in London, under whom she graduated from the Royal College of Music in 1950. Her first professional work was for BBC Radio, broadcasting Spanish and Hispano-American songs. Her stage debut was in the title role of Bizet's Carmen, during Carl Rosa Opera's Scottish 1949 tour.

She achieved international recognition when she appeared in the title role of Angelina in Rossini's La Cenerentola at the 1952 Glyndebourne Festival, conducted by Vittorio Gui. She repeated her success the following year, when the production was recorded for LP by EMI, and in 1954, when the production was also seen on tour at the Städtische Oper in Berlin. The production was last staged at the Royal Court Theatre in Liverpool in 1956. Further Glyndebourne roles included Baba the Turk in Stravinsky's The Rake's Progress in the opera's British premiere, conducted by Paul Sacher; and Preziosilla in the company's 1955 production of Verdi's La forza del destino at the Edinburgh Festival, conducted by John Pritchard. She became a regular singer at the Royal Opera House, where her roles included Carmen, Rosina in Rossini's Il barbiere di Siviglia and Azucena in Verdi's Il trovatore.

At the Liceu in Barcelona, she first appeared in 1954 as Angelina, repeating her signature role the following year in Monte Carlo. In 1956 she first appeared at the Teatro Colón in Buenos Aires in the world premiere of Juan José Castro's opera Bodas de Sangre. The theatre became her main base of operations in the following years, where she added Marfa in Mussorgsky's Khovanshchina, Isabella in Rossini's L'italiana in Algeri, Orfeo in Gluck's Orfeo ed Euridice and Santuzza in Mascagni's Cavalleria rusticana to her repertoire. She appeared at the Grand Théâtre of Geneva, La Monnaie in Brussels, La Fenice in Venice and the Opera di Roma, as well as concert appearances in Spanish repertoire under conductors including Leopold Stokowski, Ataúlfo Argenta and Lorin Maazel.

After her marriage (1959) to the Italian industrialist Giancarlo Villa, and the birth of their daughter Beatriz in 1961, her career took second place in her life – although she did achieve a major success in Pretoria during 1964, with performances as Azucena, Carmen, and Amneris in Verdi's Aida. She also maintained a fruitful musical partnership with the guitarist Julian Bream, with whom she regularly performed in Spanish voice-guitar recitals. In 1968 she showed the first signs of the serious illness which was to cause her definitive retirement, and her death in 1972 while undergoing treatment in Paris.

== Vocal style ==
Although famed for its agility, her dark mezzo-soprano was heavier than that style usually associated with the Rossini repertoire in which she achieved her earlier successes. Her range (Middle C to High D) was wide and true, her lower register rich in colour – although for some critics her voice tended to become hard and occasionally strained in its upper registers, and others felt that her talents were better-suited to the stage than to the recording studio. Nevertheless, her small legacy of commercial recordings (supplemented by many off-air performances) assures her a significant place amongst the finest 20th-century operatic mezzo-sopranos.

== Recordings ==
Gabaráin's recordings include:

Year	Composer – Opera (role)	Cast, Orchestra, Chorus and Conductor	Label
1953	La Cenerentola (Angelina)	Sesto Bruscantini (Dandino), Ian Wallace (Don Magnifico), Juan Oncina (Ramiro), Chorus and Orchestra of Glyndebourne Festival, Vittorio Gui	CD: Warner Classics 0288462 (2011)
1957	de Falla – Siete canciones populares españolas	Hallé Orchestra, John Barbirolli	CD: Warner Classics 9029538608 (2020)
1959	Carissimi – Historia Divitis	Orchestra Dell'Angelicum Di Milano, Umberto Cattini	LP: Angelicum LPA-972 (1959)
1955	de Falla – El amor brujo (Gitana)	Orchestre de la Suisse Romande, Ernest Ansermet	CD: Decca 4339082 (1999)
