= Hetty Plümacher =

German opera singer (1919–2005)

- Born: 3 December 1919; Solingen, Germany
- Died: 3 June 2005 (aged 85); Steinenbronn, Germany
- Other names: Hedwig Mathilde Lipp
- Education: Musikhochschule Köln
- Occupation: Operatic mezzo-soprano
- Organizations: Staatstheater Stuttgart; Mozarteum; Staatliche Hochschule für Musik und Darstellende Kunst Stuttgart

Hedwig Mathilde Plümacher (3 December 1919 – 3 June 2005) was a German operatic singer who appeared on stage as Hetty Plümacher. A long-term member of the Staatstheater Stuttgart, she also performed at international festivals and major opera houses, as well as recording music.

== Career ==
Hedwig Mathilde Plümacher was born in Solingen, and studied voice at the Musikhochschule Köln. After her first engagement in Oslo in 1943, she was member of the ensemble of the Staatstheater Stuttgart from 1946 to 1976. She often performed in Munich and Vienna, but gradually made her way into all major European opera houses.

Plümacher appeared at the Salzburg Festival from 1963 to 1965, at the Bayreuth Festival from 1953 to 1957, and at the Schwetzingen Festival in 1957.

Her main roles were initially in operas by Mozart and Richard Strauss, later she also played dramatic roles in Wagner operas. She was also a sought-after concert soloist for the Passions by Johann Sebastian Bach, the oratorios by Handel and Felix Mendelssohn, and Verdi's Requiem.

In opera, Plümacher sang mezzo-soprano and contralto.

After leaving the stage she taught as a professor at the Mozarteum in Salzburg and at the Staatliche Hochschule für Musik und Darstellende Kunst Stuttgart.

When she married her name was Hedwig Mathilde Lipp.

On 3 December 2005, at the age of 85, Plümacher died at her long-time residence in Steinenbronn. Her grave is in Dettenhausen.

== Recordings ==
- Richard Strauss: Die schweigsame Frau – Vienna Philharmonic, conducted by Karl Böhm, with Fritz Wunderlich, Hermann Prey, Hetty Plümacher, Hilde Güden. Deutsche Grammophon (Universal)
- Wagner Parsifal – Hans Knappertsbusch 1954, with Josef Greindl, Wolfgang Windgassen, Hetty Plümacher. Archipel 4CDs ARPCD 0283
- Hetty Plümacher – Arias from The Marriage of Figaro, La clemenza di Tito, Il turco in Italia, Mignon, The Merry Wives of Windsor, The Tales of Hoffmann, Madama Butterfly, La Cenerentola, Samson and Delilah, La forza del destino, Die toten Augen, Der Bettelstudent and Oberon. uraCant 2055, Broadcast Performances, 1949–61
- Offenbach: Hoffmanns Erzählungen – Hans Müller-Kray, with Hetty Plümacher. Rec. 1949/Walhall Eternity /2 CDs
- Wagner: Der Ring des Nibelungen – Vienna Philharmonic, conducted by Sir Georg Solti, with George London, Hetty Plümacher, Kirsten Flagstad, Waldemar Kmentt, Gottlob Frick. Decca
- Mozart Die Zauberflöte – Vienna Philharmonic, Sir Georg Solti, with Cristina Deutekom, Dietrich Fischer-Dieskau, Hetty Plümacher (Third Lady), Hermann Prey, Renate Holm, Gerhard Stolze, René Kollo. DECCA 479/81 Stereo, Box, 3 LPs + Book – AA
- Wolfgang Fortner: Bluthochzeit, with Hetty Plümacher. Immortal DVD Cat. No. – IMM950017
- Weber: Oberon – Wilhelm Schüchter, mit Hetty Plümacher. Eurodisc 70828 1LP (1964)
- Puccini: Madama Butterfly – Ferdinand Leitner 1960, with Anny Schlemm, Sándor Kónya, Hetty Plümacher, Kim Borg. Deutsche Grammophon
- Mozart: Così fan tutte
- Flotow: Martha – with Wilma Lipp, Hetty Plümacher. Relief CD album (2 volumes), 02/2006
- Marschner: Hans Heiling – Joseph Keilberth, with Hermann Prey, Hetty Plümacher. MYTO Records 2 MCD 005.232
- d'Albert: Die toten Augen – with Marianne Schech, Wolfgang Windgassen, Hetty Plümacher. Myto Historical Series 00152
