= Gertrude Förstel =

German opera singer (1880–1950)

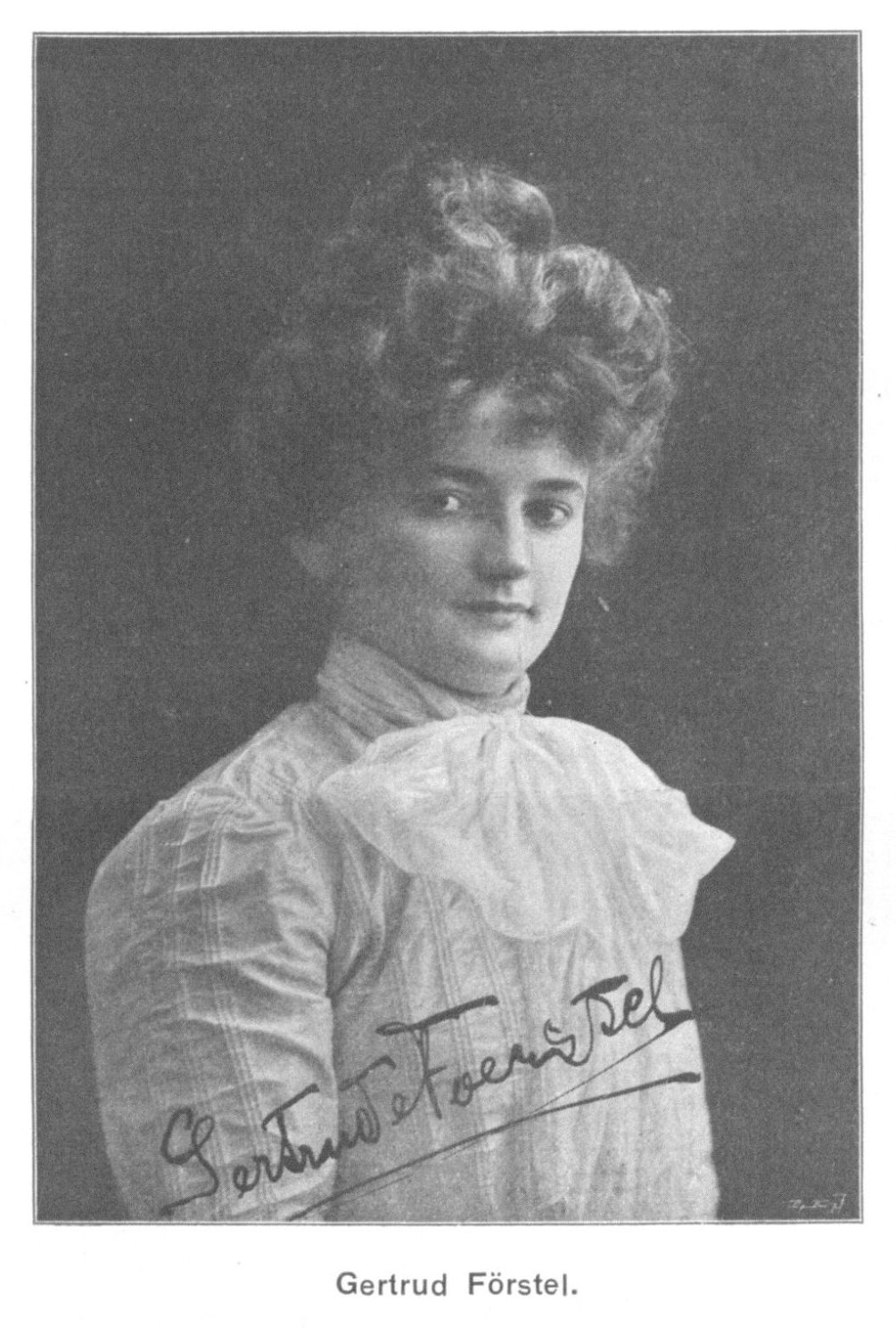
- Förstel in 1902
- Born: 21 December 1880; Leipzig, German Empire
- Died: 7 June 1950 (aged 69); Bad Godesberg, Germany
- Other names: Gertrude Förstel-Link
- Occupations: Classical soprano; Academic teacher
- Organizations: Wiener Hofoper; Musikhochschule Köln

Gertrude Förstel (21 December 1880 – 7 June 1950) was a German operatic dramatic soprano and an academic voice teacher. She performed the soprano solo in Mahler's Fourth Symphony internationally, and participated in the premieres of Eugen d'Albert's Tiefland and Mahler's Eighth Symphony.

== Career ==
Born in Leipzig the daughter of a member of the Gewandhausorchester, she was supposed to be a pianist, studied piano at the Leipzig Conservatory and made her debut in 1897 in Werdau. Angelo Neumann noticed her voice, and he supported her studies in Berlin with Bertha Niklas-Kempner and in Dresden with Aglaja Orgeni. She made her operatic debut at the Deutsches Theater Prag, which Neumann directed, on 1 September 1900 as Amina in Bellini's Die Nachtwandlerin. She performed the part of Nuri in the premiere of Eugen d'Albert's Tiefland there on 15 November 1903.

On 11 April 1905 she appeared as a guest at the Wiener Hofoper as Sulamith in Karl Goldmark's Die Königin von Saba, where she was then engaged as member from 1906 to 1912. She appeared as Sophie in Der Rosenkavalier by Richard Strauss when the opera was staged in Vienna for the first time in 1911.

From 1904 to 1912, she performed several times at the Bayreuth Festival, in parts such as Waldvogel in Siegfried, and Woglinde in Der Ring des Nibelungen, among others.

In concert, she participated in 1910 in the premiere of Mahler's Eighth Symphony. Her performance of the soprano solo in Mahler's Fourth Symphony, delivered also in Paris, has been regarded as one of her best achievements.

After retiring from the stage, she was a voice teacher at the Musikhochschule Köln. One of her students was Ilse Hollweg. Förstel died in Bad Godesberg, Germany.

== Literature ==
- Ludwig Eisenberg : Großes biographisches Lexikon der Deutschen Bühne im XIX. Jahrhundert. Verlag von Paul List, Leipzig 1903, p. 267f.

== Bibliography ==
- Kutsch, Karl-Josef; Riemens, Leo, eds. (2003). "Förstel, Gertrude". Großes Sängerlexikon (in German). Vol. 1 (4th ed.). Walter de Gruyter. p. 1503. ISBN 3-598-11598-9.
- "Gertrude Förstel" (in German). Bayerisches Musiker-Lexikon Online (BMLO).
- "Ilse Hollweg". Bayreuth Festival. Archived from the original on 30 July 2017.
