= Anneliese Rothenberger =

German operatic soprano

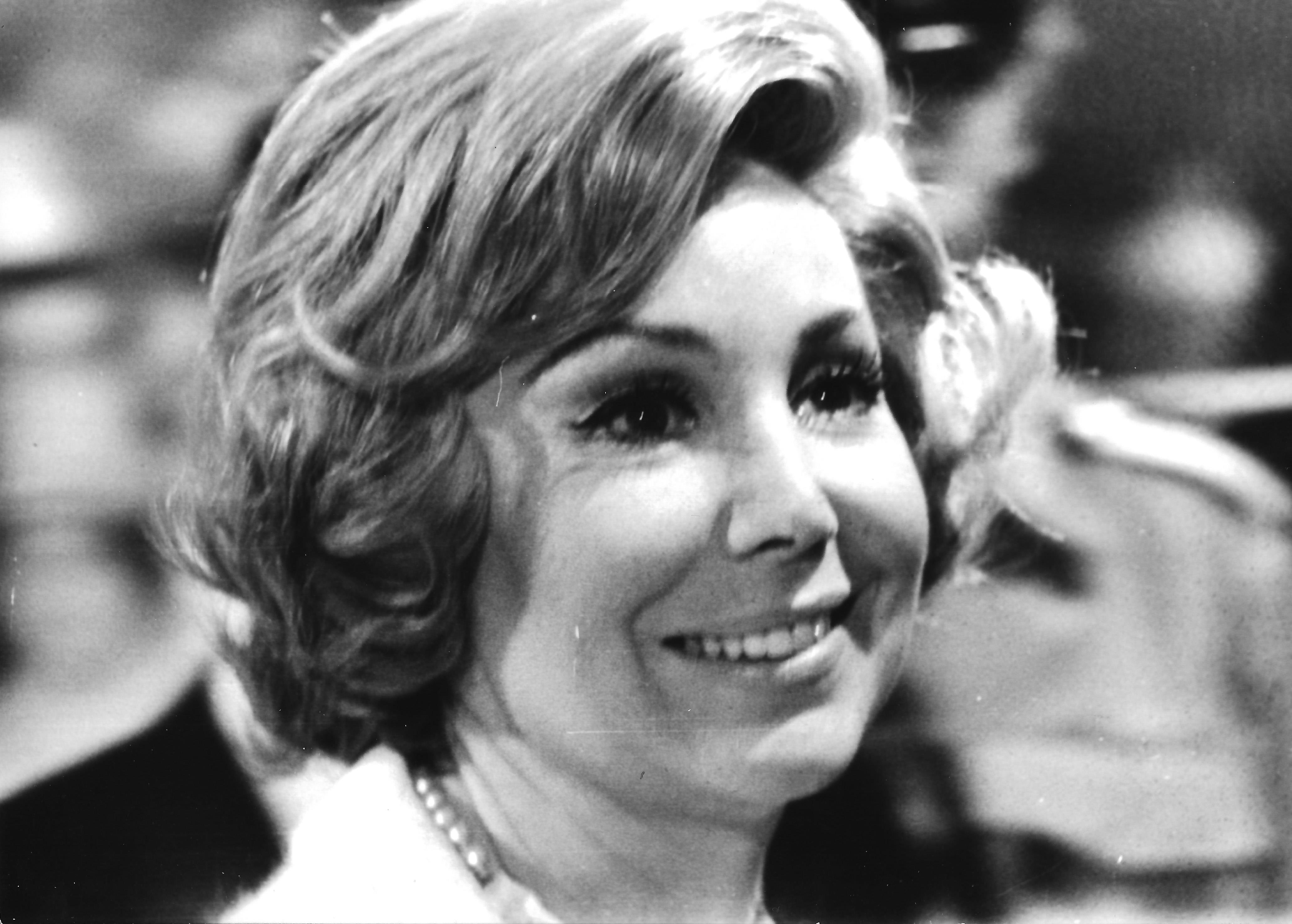
Anneliese Rothenberger as Sophie in Richard Strauss' Der Rosenkavalier.

Anneliese Rothenberger (19 June 1919 – 24 May 2010) was a German operatic soprano who had an active international performance career which spanned from 1942 to 1983. She specialized in the lyric coloratura soprano repertoire, and was particularly admired for her interpretations of the works of Wolfgang Amadeus Mozart and Richard Strauss.

== Life and career ==
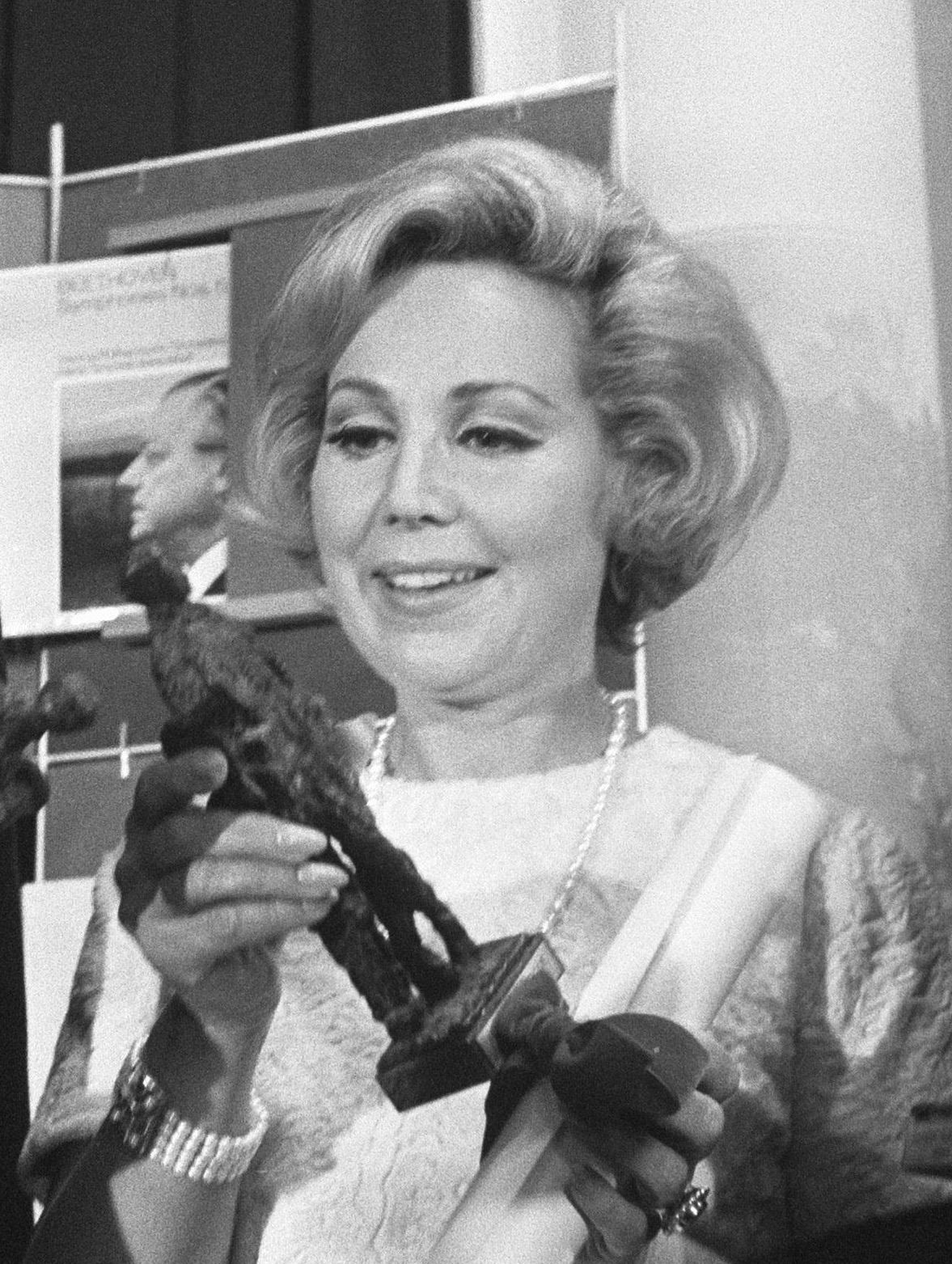
Anneliese Rothenberger with the Dutch Edison Award in 1969.

Rothenberger was born in Mannheim, Germany in 1919. She studied with Erika Müller, and took up her first engagement in Koblenz in 1942. In 1946, Günther Rennert offered her a job at the Hamburg Opera House, where she sang in Rennert's now famous production of Alban Berg's Lulu twenty years later, a role she would also perform at the Munich Opera Festival, under the direction of Christoph von Dohnányi.

1954 saw her make her debut at the Salzburg Festival, and she appeared in Rolf Liebermann's Schule der Frauen, three years later. From 1954, she became a guest singer at the Vienna State Opera. New York City audiences had their first chance to hear the soprano's fine voice in 1960, when she sang at the Metropolitan Opera in Arabella. She later sang there in Le nozze di Figaro, Un ballo in maschera, Orfeo ed Euridice, Die Fledermaus and La boheme. She also sang there in Der Rosenkavalier; her performance in that opera prompted Lotte Lehmann to call her 'the best Sophie in the world'. Herbert von Karajan chose her to appear alongside Elisabeth Schwarzkopf and Sena Jurinac for the filmed performance of Der Rosenkavalier at the Salzburg Festival.

Having favoured light and high-register lyric parts in the beginning of her career, by the mid-1960s she changed to roles with a stronger dramatic emphasis, including Konstanze in Mozart's Die Entführung aus dem Serail (for example 1965 with Fritz Wunderlich in the now legendary Salzburg Festival production staged by Giorgio Strehler and designed by Luciano Damiani), Fiordiligi in Così fan tutte, Zdenka in Richard Strauss's Arabella, Marie in Berg's Wozzeck, Soeur Constance in Poulenc's Dialogues of the Carmelites, and Violetta in La traviata on stage. She also appeared in many contemporary operas by Henze, Britten, Hindemith, Carl Orff, Pfitzner, and Menotti.

== Retirement ==
In the 1970s, she became a popular television personality. She retired in 1983. When her husband died after 45 years of marriage in 1999, she settled in Switzerland, on Lake Constance. In 2003, she received the Echo Klassik Award for lifetime achievement. She wrote an autobiography in 1973: Melodie meines Lebens.

She died in May 2010 in Münsterlingen, Switzerland, aged 90. The Anneliese Rothenberger rose (a.k.a. Oregold rose) is named after her.

== Recordings ==
A large number of complete recordings and highlights discs bear witness to her opera work: among these are The Magic Flute, Don Giovanni, Idomeneo, Arabella, Die Fledermaus, Orfeo ed Euridice, Hänsel und Gretel, The Merry Widow, La bohème, La traviata, and Martha, and a much-celebrated The Marriage of Figaro. Her partners on stage and on records included, among many others, Lisa della Casa, Dietrich Fischer-Dieskau, Fritz Wunderlich, Irmgard Seefried, Nicolai Gedda, Peter Schreier, Walter Berry, and Rudolf Schock. Her discography also includes many operetta and lieder recordings.

== Sources ==
- "Rothenberger, Anneliese" by Harold Rosenthal, in The New Grove Dictionary of Opera, ed. Stanley Sadie (London, 1992) ISBN 0-333-73432-7
- Anneliese Rothenberger at IMDb
