= Tatiana Menotti =

Italian opera singer

- Tatiana Menotti in La traviata (photo with 1946 dedication)
- Occupation: opera soprano singer

Tatiana Menotti (24 June 1909 – 3 October 2001) was an Italian operatic soprano. Born to Italian baritone Delfino Menotti and his Russian wife in Boston, Massachusetts, Menotti grew up in Trieste. In 1936, she sang the role of Despina in Così fan tutte at Glyndebourne. For 25 years, she was a principal artist at La Scala in Milan. She stopped her career in 1957 in order to support her husband, the Spanish tenor Juan Oncina. She died in Barcelona following an intracranial hemorrhage.
