= Kurt Marschner =

German operatic tenor

Kurt Marschner (27 April 1913 – 25 September 1984) was a German operatic tenor and actor.

== Life and career ==
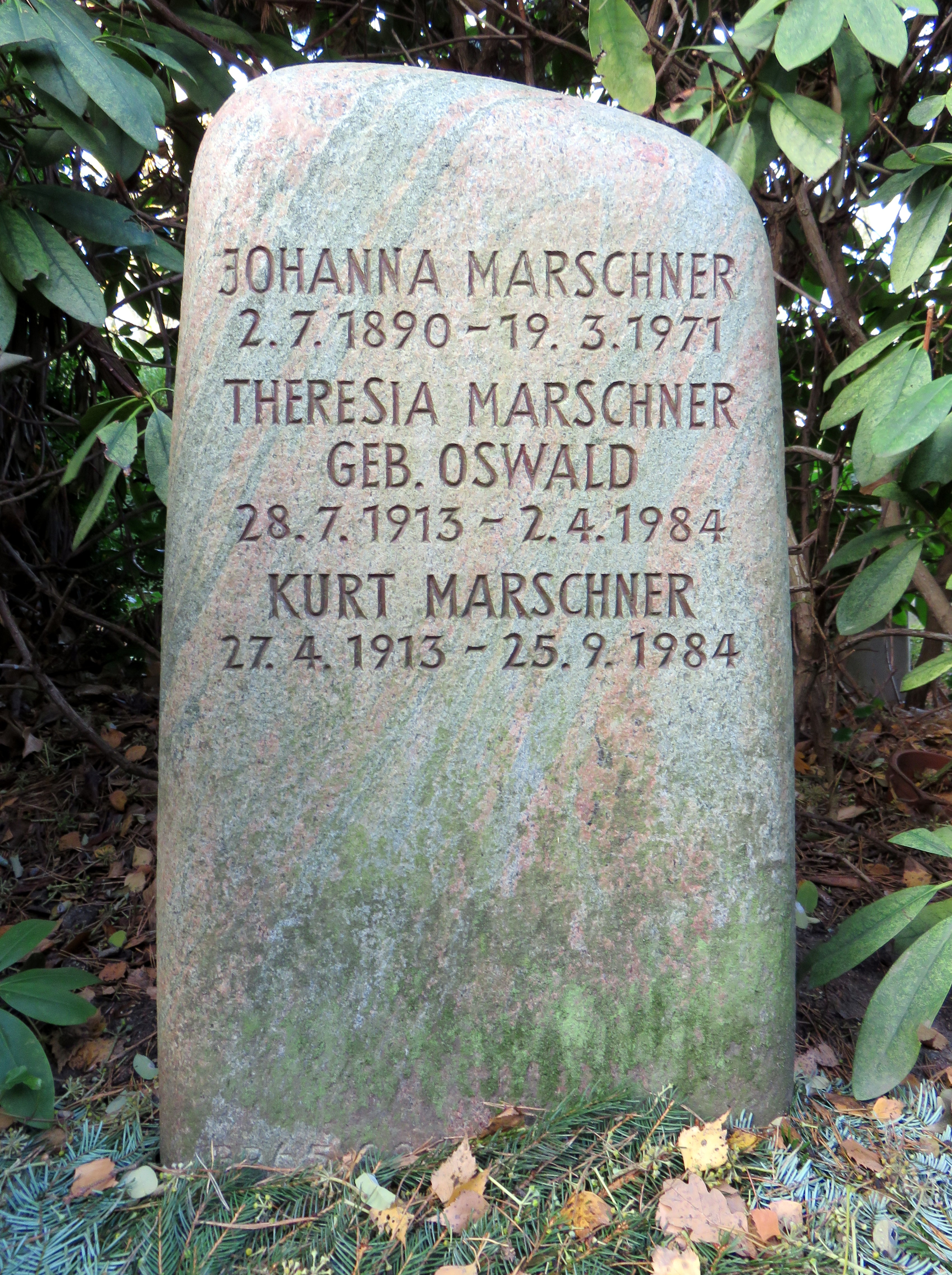
Grabstein Kurt Marschner, Friedhof Ohlsdorf

Born in Krásná Lípa, Marschner trained as a singer at the Dresden Conservatory. He made his debut in Karlsbad (Sudetenland), not far from his native village. From 1942 to 1944 Marschner sang at the opera in German-occupied Oslo. After the end of the war he played in Oldenburg and Frankfurt. In 1949 Marschner joined the Hamburg State Opera where he remained a member of the ensemble for several decades. At this venue he took part in over 4000 performances.

In addition to his work on stage, Marschner also appeared in filmed performances beginning in the 1960s: At first he played and sang small parts in works such as Fidelio and The Magic Flute. In later years Marschner also took over bigger supporting roles such as Balthasar Zorn in Wagner's Die Meistersinger von Nürnberg and also leading roles such as Orpheus in Offenbach's Orpheus in the Underworld. In some filmed performances he was the voice dubbed in for the actor (e.g. 1953 in La traviata and 1964 in Die Reise auf den Mond).

Marschner died in Hamburg at age 71. He is buried in the Friedhof Ohlsdorf in Hamburg.

== Literature ==
- Who’s Who in the Arts, two volumes. 2nd revised edition, Wörthsee 1978. First volume, p. 604
