= Murray Dickie =

Scottish opera singer (1924–1995)

Murray Dickie OBE (3 April 1924 – 19 June 1995) was a Scottish tenor opera singer and director, who established his career in England, Austria and Italy during the 1950s. In addition to his extensive stage work he was a prolific recording artist.

== Early career 1947–1955 ==
Born in Bishopton, Scotland, Dickie had his first vocal training in Glasgow. He studied in Vienna with Stefan Pollmann, and afterwards he studied in London with Dino Borgioli, and in Milan with Guido Farinelli. He at first worked for the BBC as effects boy and went on to become a production assistant.

His debut was at the Cambridge Theatre in London in January 1947 as part of the New London Opera Company, as Almaviva in Il barbiere di Siviglia, a role he afterwards repeated for them on several occasions. He joined the new resident company at Covent Garden when it was first formed after the War, from 1948 to 1952. His debut there was as Tamino. An early triumph was as David in Die Meistersinger von Nürnberg, a role with which he became identified. In 1952 he was invited to undertake this role at La Scala by Wilhelm Furtwängler, and won approval. He also sang the role in Berlin, Munich, Vienna and elsewhere. He made debuts in 1950 in Barcelona and in 1951 in Rome, and at the Vienna State Opera, where he was immediately engaged as a permanent member of the company. In 1949 he created the role of Curé in the Arthur Bliss opera The Olympians at Covent Garden.

In the Glyndebourne Festival of 1950, Dickie appeared as Don Basilio, Pedrillo and as Brighella in Ariadne auf Naxos, and went to the Edinburgh Festival with the company later in the same year. Thereafter he sang regularly with the Glyndebourne company and at Edinburgh. In October 1951 he appeared as Florestein in Sir Thomas Beecham's revival of The Bohemian Girl: he sang David at Covent Garden under Beecham (parts of which were recorded live) and that year also appeared in Der Rosenkavalier and again as Don Basilio. As his career in Vienna got under way in 1952 he repeated the roles of David and Pedrillo, and also performed Jacquino, with great success. He took part in the 1952 Paris Festival of Twentieth Century Music, and sang as a guest at Munich (1952 and 1953) with the Bavarian State Opera.

He performed David again for the Covent Garden coronation season of 1953, and sang at Glyndebourne in their Coronation Festival. He then took part in the British premiere of Stravinsky's The Rake's Progress, at Edinburgh. Also in that year he sang at Berlin, and took part in the French premiere of Die Liebe der Danae at the Paris Opéra. In 1954 he appeared at Glyndebourne as Leandro in Ferruccio Busoni's Arlecchino. He had by this time also become an experienced broadcaster.

== Continuing career ==
In 1976, he translated and directed A Night in Venice for English National Opera at the London Coliseum.

In 1975, Dickie was awarded the Austrian Cross of Honour for Science and Art, 1st class. He was appointed OBE in the 1976 New Year Honours.

Dickie died in 1995 in Cape Town, South Africa, aged 71.

== Family details ==
Murray Dickie was the younger brother of William Dickie, a singer who studied with Pollman, Titta Ruffo, Giuseppe De Luca and Gino Bechi. William sang in Glasgow during the 1930s and in London and Italy after 1946. Murray Dickie was married to the singer Maureen Springer, also a member of the Vienna company and who often joined her husband in concert. Together they had four sons. Their eldest son John Dickie too was a member of the Vienna company.

== Selected recordings ==
There are many recordings featuring Dickie in his characteristic roles in opera, and in works of the concert hall. A selection follows:

- Beethoven: Ninth Symphony, with Gottlob Frick, Elisabeth Höngen and Wilma Lipp, conducted by Carl Schuricht, Orchestre de la Société des Concerts du Conservatoire de Paris. (EMI Angel CD)
- Beethoven: Fidelio, conducted by Eugen Jochum, Rai Symphony Orchestra of Rome (Melodram CD)
- Berg: Wozzeck (in the role of Andrès), conducted by Karl Böhm (1955). (Andante CD)
- Bizet: Carmen, conducted by Lorin Maazel, Vienna State Opera (live recording). (Orfeo D'Or CD)
- Mahler: Das Lied von der Erde, with Dietrich Fischer-Dieskau, conducted by Paul Kletzki, Philharmonia Orchestra. (EMI Classics CD)
- Richard Strauss: Die Frau ohne Schatten (as Barak's brother), conducted by Karl Böhm, Vienna Philharmonic. (Opera D'Oro CD)
- Richard Strauss: Der Rosenkavalier conducted by Georg Solti, Vienna Philharmonic (1968). (London/Decca CD)
- Richard Strauss: Salome, conducted by Karl Böhm, Vienna State Opera (1972). (Opera D'Oro CD)
- Mozart: Requiem in D minor with Elisabeth Höngen, Wilma Lipp, Ludwig Weber, conducted by Jascha Horenstein, Wiener Musikverein (1956). (Vox Classic CD)
- Mozart: Great Mass, with Walter Berry, Wilma Lipp, Christa Ludwig, conducted by Ferdinand Grossmann. (Preiser CD)
- Mozart: Die Entführung aus dem Serail (as Pedrillo), conducted by George Szell, Vienna Philharmonic (live at Salzburg Festival 1956). (Melodram CD)
- Mozart: Le nozze di Figaro, (as Basilio), conducted by Erich Kleiber, Vienna Philharmonic (1956). (London/Decca CD). For details, see Le nozze di Figaro (Kleiber recording).
- Offenbach: The tales of Hoffmann, conducted by Thomas Beecham, Sadler's Wells. (Pearl CD)
- Poulenc: Dialogues des Carmélites, conducted by Berislav Klobučar, Vienna State Opera (1961). (Ponto CD)
- Monteverdi: Il ritorno d'Ulisse in patria (as Iro), conducted by Nikolaus Harnoncourt, Concentus Musicus Wien (1971). (Teldec Das Alte Werk)
- Wagner: Die Meistersinger von Nürnberg (as David), conducted by Fritz Reiner, Vienna State Opera (1955). (Orfeo D'Or)
- Wagner: Die Meistersinger von Nürnberg, acts 1 and 2, (as David), cond Thomas Beecham, Covent Garden 1951. (Gebhardt CD)
- Wagner: Tannhäuser, cond Artur Rodziński, Rome (1957). (IDI CD)
- Folk and Traditional Songs – from England, the Hebrides, Ireland and Scotland, with John Pritchard, piano (Philips mono 10" LP)
