= Alda Noni =

Italian soprano

Alda Noni as Adina in L'elisir d'amore (photo with 1949 dedication).

Alda Noni (30 April 1916 – 19 May 2011) was an Italian soprano leggiero, one of the leading soubrettes of the immediate postwar period.

Born in Trieste, she first studied voice and piano in her native city, and completed her studies in Vienna. She made her professional debut in Ljubljana in 1937, as Rosina, later appearing in Zagreb and Belgrade.

She sang at the Vienna State Opera from 1942 to 1946, in Mozart, Rossini and lighter Donizetti roles, such as: Susanna, Zerlina, Despina, Adina, Norina. She was chosen by Richard Strauss himself, to sing Zerbinetta in 1944, to celebrate his 80th birthday.

She sang widely in Italy, both on stage and on radio broadcast, where she was admired in opera by Cimarosa, Paisiello, and Fioravanti, often partnering Cesare Valletti and Sesto Bruscantini. She also appeared in London, 1946, Glyndebourne, 1949, and made her Paris Opéra debut in 1951, as Oscar, later singing Nanetta. She retired from the stage in 1955. She can be heard in many recordings made for Cetra Records in the early 1950s, notably Le cantatrici villane, Le nozze di Figaro, Il matrimonio segreto, L'elisir d'amore, Don Pasquale, I quatro rusteghi.

== Sources ==
- Le guide de l'opéra, les indispensables de la musique, R. Mancini & J-J. Rouvereux, (Fayard, 1986), ISBN 978-2-213-59567-2
