= Petre Munteanu =

Romanian opera singer

- Petre Munteanu in Falstaff, Bologna (photo with 1953 dedication)
- Occupation: tenor opera singer

Petre Munteanu (26 November 1916 – 18 July 1988) was a Romanian operatic tenor particularly associated with Mozart and lighter Italian roles.

== Life and career ==
Born in Câmpina, Romania, Munteanu studied at the Bucharest Conservatory. He made his operatic debut in 1940 at Bucharest Opera House. However, he continued his studies in Germany, notably in Berlin with Hermann Weißenborn, and after World War II, he began to appear in Italy in concert.

In 1947, he made his debut at the Rome Opera House, as Don Ottavio in Don Giovanni, and at La Scala in Milan, as Ferrando in Cosi fan tutte. He took part in the premiere of works such as Igor Stravinsky's Persephone, Alban Berg's Wozzeck, Rimsky-Korsakov's The Snow Maiden, as well as a revival of Domenico Cimarosa's Il credulo.

In August 1947 he vacationed with his bride Johanna Winter (born 1924) at her father Gustav Winter's Canary Island retreat on Jandía, Fuerteventura. While on this trip, he performed in Las Palmas, Gran Canaria on September 11, 1947.

He made guest appearances in Trieste, Florence, Naples, the Bavarian State Opera in Munich, the Vienna State Opera, the Royal Opera House in London, the Glyndebourne Festival and the Edinburgh Festival. In 1961, he took part in the creation of Luigi Nono's Intolleranza 1960 at the Teatro La Fenice in Venice.

Other notable roles included Pedrillo in Die Entfuhrung aus dem Serail, Tamino in Die Zauberflöte, Almaviva in Il barbiere di Siviglia, Nemorino in L'elisir d'amore, Ernesto in Don Pasquale, Cassio in Otello, Fenton in Falsaff, Feliperto in I quatro rusteghi. He was also admired in Bach's and Haydn's oratorios, and in Lieder recitals.

Later in life, he worked as a teacher at the Milan Conservatory. He died in Milan at the age of 71.

== Sources ==
- Petre Munteanu at Bach-Cantatas.com
