= Gisela Litz =

German operatic contralto (1922–2023)

- Born: 14 December 1922; Hamburg, Germany
- Died: 21 July 2023 (aged 100)
- Occupations: Opera singer
- Instruments: Voice

Gisela Litz (14 December 1922 – 21 July 2023) was a German contralto who sang frequently at the Bayreuth Festival. A recording is available of her singing as one of the Rhinemaidens in Der Ring des Nibelungen conducted by Clemens Krauss in 1953.

Litz sang the part of Widow Bigbeck in the recording of the Brecht/Weill opera Rise and Fall of the City of Mahagonny by the Norddeutscher Rundfunk Orchestra and Chorus.

She sang the role of Irmentraut, Marie's governess in the 1964 Columbia recording of Albert Lortzing opera Der Waffenschmied conducted by Fritz Lehan. And the role of Die Gräfin in the 1963 EMI Electrola recording of Albert Lortzing opera Der Wildschütz conducted by Robert Heger.

Gisela Litz turned 100 in December 2022, and died on 21 July 2023.
