= Dermot Troy =

Irish tenor singer

Dermot Troy (31 July 1927 – 6 September 1962) was an Irish lyric tenor mainly associated with the music of Mozart.

== Life and career ==
Troy was born in Tinahely, County Wicklow, and was raised in Inchicore, Dublin. As a young man he joined the Royal Air Force in 1945. He left the R.A.F. in 1948 but had received a serious hearing loss in his right ear due to an explosion.

In 1952 he entered a voice competition, which was coordinated with the opening of the Mario Lanza film The Great Caruso. After winning the Irish section of this competition, he attended the finals in England where he was runner-up. This brought a good deal of interest in his voice. He began with the noted Italian tenor Dino Borgioli and had a number of singing engagements in England.

He had a breakthrough in 1958 when he was invited to sing leading tenor roles at the Mannheim State Opera (the same year he sang the small role of Gastone in La traviata at Covent Garden next to the Violetta of Maria Callas - a live recording of one of the performances has been released by EMI). Another opportunity opened up for him in 1960 when he was invited to sing at the prestigious Hamburg State Opera.

In June 1961 he suffered a heart attack. He was known to be a very heavy smoker. He returned to Dublin for his recovery and in April 1962 he was able to return to Hamburg where in September 1962 he suffered a fatal heart attack.

Troy did not leave many recordings. He is a member of a prestigious cast on an EMI recording of Richard Strauss' Capriccio and in the 1957 recording of a live performance of Les Troyens (Hylas) by Berlioz. He also recorded Mozart's Zaide. Of Irish music, he recorded selections of Thomas Moore's Irish Melodies and a small number of songs by John F. Larchet and Aloys Fleischmann.

== Selected recordings ==
- Dermot Troy Remembered, RTÉ Lyric FM CD 114 (2007); works by A. Fleischmann, J. F. Larchet, W. A. Mozart, F. Schubert, E. Grieg, F. Léhar, Cardillo, L. Denza, Tosti, Capel, H. Wood, Henry Bishop, I. Novello, Sanderson.

== Bibliography ==
- Gus Smith: Irish Stars of the Opera (Dublin: Madison Publishers, 1994), p. 99–112; ISBN 1-870862-02-3
