= Ilse Hollweg =

German opera singer

- Born: 23 February 1922; Solingen, Germany
- Died: 9 February 1990 (aged 67); Solingen, Germany
- Education: Musikhochschule Köln
- Occupation: Operatic coloratura soprano
- Organizations: Deutsche Oper am Rhein

Ilse Hollweg (23 February 1922 – 9 February 1990) was a German operatic coloratura soprano. A member of the Deutsche Oper am Rhein, she appeared at major European opera houses and festivals including the Bayreuth Festival and the Glyndebourne Festival.

== Career ==
Born in Solingen, Hollweg studied voice at the Musikhochschule Köln with Gertrude Förstel. She sang the solo in Ein deutsches Requiem by Brahms already in 1939. She made her debut in 1943 at the Theater Saarbrücken as Blonde in Mozart's Die Entführung aus dem Serail. In 1946 she became first coloratura soprano at the Deutsche Oper am Rhein where she was a member until 1970. In 1951 she took part in the premiere there of Winfried Zillig's Troilus und Cressida.

In 1950 she appeared as Konstanze in Mozart's Entführung at the Glyndebourne Festival. That same year, she performed Zerbinetta in Ariadne auf Naxos by Richard Strauss there, repeated in 1954. She also appeared at the Salzburg Festival and the Bayreuth Festival, where she performed the part of the Forest Bird in Wagner's Siegfried. In Lieder recitals, she collaborated with Sebastian Peschko. In 1964 she took part in the premiere at the Hamburgische Staatsoper of Ernst Krenek's Der goldene Bock. She appeared at major German opera houses, at La Scala, Covent Garden, and the Vienna State Opera, among others.

Hollweg taught voice at the Alanus University of Arts and Social Sciences. She died in Solingen.

== Recordings ==
In 1956, Hollweg recorded Mozart's Entführung with Sir Thomas Beecham conducting the Royal Philharmonic Orchestra, alongside Lois Marshall as Konstanze, Léopold Simoneau as Belmonte, Gerhard Unger as Pedrillo and Gottlob Frick as Osmin. She and Unger were the only soloists who also performed the spoken dialogue. A reviewer noted: "Her security up high and purity of tone in 'Durch Zärtlichkeit' is awe-inspiring, as is her overall range. On the other end of the emotional scale lies her Act 2 'Welche Wonne', negotiated with enviable ease by Hollweg."

She recorded in 1965 Luigi Nono's Il canto sospeso with the Royal Concertgebouw Orchestra, conducted by Pierre Boulez.

== Literature ==
Karl Ruhrberg (1971). Ilse Hollweg. Duisburg. ISBN 3-87096-115-5.
