= Juan Oncina =

Spanish opera singer (1921–2009)

- Juan Oncina (photo with 1953 dedication)
- Occupation: tenor opera singer

Juan Oncina (15 April 1921 in Barcelona – 29 December 2009 in Barcelona) was a Spanish tenor, particularly associated with Rossini and light Donizetti roles, one of the leading tenore di grazia of the 1950s.

== Life and career ==
Juan Oncina began his vocal studies in Barcelona with Mercedes Capsir, and later in Milan, with Augusta Oltrabella. He made his debut in Barcelona, as des Grieux in Manon, in 1946. The same year he made his Italian debut in Bologna, as Almaviva in Il barbiere di Siviglia. He appeared in 1949, as Paolino in Il matrimonio segreto, in Paris, and in Cherubini's L'osteria portoghese and Lully's Armide, in Florence.

The turning point in his career came in 1952, when he made his debut at the Glyndebourne Festival, where he was to appear until 1961, especially in Rossini roles such as Almaviva, Lindoro in L'italiana in Algeri, Ramiro in La Cenerentola, and most notably as Le comte Ory, possibly his greatest success.

Apart from Rossini, he also excelled in opera by Cimarosa and Paisiello. Other notable roles included: Don Ottavio in Don Giovanni, Nemorino in L'elisir d'amore, Ernesto in Don Pasquale, Fenton in Falstaff. In the 1960s, he began, perhaps unwisely, to expand his repertory towards heavier roles in opera by Verdi and Puccini.

Oncina was married to soprano Tatiana Menotti.

== Selected recordings ==
- G.Rossini - Le Comte Ory - Vittorio Gui - EMI - 1956
- G.Rossini - La Cenerentola - Vittorio Gui - EMI - 1953
- G.Donizetti - Don Pasquale - István Kertész - DECCA - 1964
- G.Verdi - Falstaff - Leonard Bernstein - Sony - 1966
- G.Verdi - Un giorno di regno - Alfredo Simonetto - Cetra - 1951

== Sources ==
- Roland Mancini and Jean-Jacques Rouveroux, (orig. H. Rosenthal and J. Warrack, French edition), Guide de l’opéra, Les indispensables de la musique (Fayard, 1995). ISBN 2-213-59567-4
