= Arnold van Mill =

Dutch opera singer (1921–1996)

Arnold van Mill (26 March 1921 in Schiedam – 5 October 1996 in Hamburg) was a Dutch bass opera singer.

== Debut ==
He made his debut in 1941 at the Circustheater in The Hague as Wagner in the opera Faust of Charles Gounod. After the Second World War ended, he started to sing at the Flemish Opera. There, he already sang, in Dutch, the great bass roles of the repertoire like Boris Godunov, King Marke, Hagen and Gurnemanz.

== Bayreuther Festspiele ==
His career got a real boost when he was invited, after an audition, to sing at the first post-war Bayreuth Festival in 1951. Wieland and Wolfgang Wagner thought Van Mill was suited well for the roles of Titurel (Parsifal), Hunding (Die Walküre) and Hans Sachs. It was the beginning of a long period in Bayreuth, although it was not as long as it could have been. Van Mill sang all important bass roles in Bayreuth, until a misunderstanding about Van Mill's cancellation of Bayreuth performances in favour of Venice in 1958 and Milan in 1959 ended the cooperation between Wieland Wagner and Van Mill.

== Other roles ==
Between 1950 and 1980 he was famous not only for his interpretations of roles in operas of Richard Wagner, but also of roles in the operas of Wolfgang Amadeus Mozart and Giuseppe Verdi. He also performed with success in comic operas like Zar und Zimmermann by Albert Lortzing. He worked with the great stars of the fifties and sixties like Kirsten Flagstad, Birgit Nilsson, Christa Ludwig, Herbert von Karajan, Wolfgang Windgassen, Hans Knappertsbusch and Dietrich Fischer-Dieskau.

He was a member of the Hamburg State Opera from 1953 to 1971 where he received the German/Austrian honorary title of Kammersänger in 1962.

His legacy on record consists of, among others, Die Entführung aus dem Serail (Osmin), Tristan und Isolde (König Marke), Die Walküre (Hunding) and Aida (Ramfis). He also sang in the famous 1959 recording of Mahler's 8th Symphony conducted by Jascha Horenstein.
