= Leopold Ludwig =

German conductor (1908–1979)

- Leopold Ludwig (photo with dedication)
- Born: 12 January 1908; Witkowitz, Moravia
- Died: 25 April 1979 (aged 71); Lüneburg, Lower Saxony, Germany
- Education: Vienna Conservatory
- Occupation: conductor
- Known for: principal conductor of the Oldenburgisches Staatstheater (1936–1939), Vienna State Opera (1939–1943), and Berlin Städtische Oper (1943–1946)
- Awards: Adolf Hitler appointed him State Kapellmeister; Johannes Brahms Medal

Leopold Ludwig (12 January 1908 – 25 April 1979) was a German conductor active mainly in Austria and Germany from the 1930s through the 1970s. He was principal conductor of the Oldenburgisches Staatstheater (1936–1939), Vienna State Opera (1939–1943), and Berlin Städtische Oper (1943–1946). From 1950–1971 he was the general music director of the Hamburg State Opera; a position which brought him international recognition. He was a frequent guest conductor at the San Francisco Opera from 1958 through 1969, and also made guest appearances with the Metropolitan Opera in the early 1970s.

== Life and career ==
Born in Witkowitz, Moravia, Leopold Ludwig was trained as a pianist at the Vienna Conservatory where he was a pupil of Emil Paur. He began his conducting career in the 1930s in south Germany and at Brno. In 1936 he became music director of the Oldenburgisches Staatstheater and concurrently was a frequent guest conductor at the Berlin State Opera. In 1939 he became the principal conductor at the Vienna State Opera; a post he held until 1943 when he became principal conductor of the Berlin Städtische Oper.

On April 20, 1942, Adolf Hitler appointed him State Kapellmeister. In 1943, he also worked as a conductor at the Berlin Municipal Opera. During his time in Berlin, among other things, a radio recording of Carl Maria von Weber's Abu Hassan was made in 1944. Ludwig was on the Gottbegnadeten-Liste in 1944.

After World War II, Ludwig was active as a conductor at both the Berlin State Oper and the Berlin Städtische Oper. After the end of World War II, he was sentenced in April 1946 by a British military court to one and a half years' suspended prison sentence and a fine for having concealed his membership in the National Socialist German Workers' Party (Nazi Party) since 1937 in the denazification questionnaire.

In 1950 he became general music director of the Hamburg State Opera (HSO), a position he held for the next 21 years. This position brought him international recognition, and he played an instrumental role in placing the Hamburg State Opera as one of the leading opera houses on the international stage by programming innovative repertoire and touring internationally with several lauded productions. The first of these was at the Edinburgh Festival in 1952 when the HSO presented the British première of Hindemith's Mathis der Maler. In 1960 he conducted the world premiere of Hans Werner Henze's Der Prinz von Homburg and in 1965 he conducted the world premiere of Giselher Klebe's Jacobowsky und der Oberst; both at the HSO.

From 1958 through 1969 Ludwig was a frequent guest conductor at the San Francisco Opera (SFO); beginning his appearances in San Francisco with a double bill performance of the United States premieres of Carl Orff's Carmina Burana and Orff's Die Kluge on 3 October 1958. He later conducted the world premiere of Norman Dello Joio's Blood Moon at the SFO on 18 September 1961, and the United States premiere of Dmitri Shostakovich's Katerina Ismailova on 23 October 1964. Other works he conducted for the SFO included Elektra (1958), Tannhäuser (1958), The Bartered Bride (1958, 1964),Ariadne auf Naxos (1959), Die Frau ohne Schatten (1959-1960, 1964), Die Meistersinger von Nürnberg (1959, 1961, 1965), Don Giovanni (1959, 1962), Simon Boccanegra (1960), Wozzeck (1960, 1962), Boris Godunov (1961), Fidelio (1961), The Rake's Progress (1962), Dialogues of the Carmelites (1963), Die Walküre (1963, 1968–1969), The Queen of Spades (1963), Die Fledermaus (1965), Lulu (1965), and Das Rheingold (1968).

Ludwig also worked internationally with other opera houses as a guest conductor. In 1959 he conducted Der Rosenkavalier at the Glyndebourne Festival. He made his conducting debut at the Metropolitan Opera on 14 November 1970, conducting Richard Wagner's Parsifal with Christa Ludwig as Kundry and Helge Brilioth in the title role. He continued to conduct at the Met in 1971–1972 with Parsifal and Der Freischütz.

Leopold Ludwig died on 25 April 1979 in Lüneburg. In 1958 he was awarded the Johannes Brahms Medal.
