= Marko Rothmüller =

Croatian operatic baritone, composer and pianist

- Born: 31 December 1908; Trnjani, Kingdom of Croatia-Slavonia, Austria-Hungary
- Died: 20 January 1993 (aged 84); Bloomington, Indiana, U.S.
- Education: University of Zagreb
- Occupations: Baritone, composer, pianist

Marko Rothmüller (born Aaron Rothmüller; 31 December 1908 – 20 January 1993) was a Croatian operatic baritone, composer and pianist.

== Early life and education ==
Rothmüller was born in the village of Trnjani near Slavonski Brod to a Jewish family, who owned a store. He was raised with five siblings (three brothers and two sisters): Branko, Avraham, Erich Cvi, Tilika and Elvira. When he was four, Rothmüller moved to Zagreb with his parents Josef and Ana (née Hahn) Rothmüller.

He studied at Zagreb Music Academy at the University of Zagreb. He later went to Vienna to train under Regina Weiss, Franz Steiner and Alban Berg. He lived and worked in Zagreb until 1935.

== Career ==
In 1932 he made his debut in Hamburg, with the role of Ottokar in Der Freischütz and was immediately ranked among the leading European interpreters of heroic baritone roles.

Because of antisemitism in Nazi Germany, Rothmüller returned home to Zagreb in 1933. In 1935 he moved to Zurich, where until 1947 he was a permanent member of the Zurich opera emphasizing the roles in Verdi and Wagner operas. Between 1946 and 1949, he was a member of the Vienna State Opera.

In London's Royal Opera House, Rothmüller made his debut in 1939 under the direction of Sir Thomas Beecham. Rothmüller was a permanent member of the Royal Opera House from 1948 until 1952. In the Glyndebourne Opera House he performed from 1949 until 1955. Occasionally he also appeared in Glyndebourne productions in Edinburgh as well. He appeared on British television in performances of Macbeth and La Forza del Destino. His Master's Voice issued a few 78 rpm records on their plum label featuring Rothmüller in rôles from Così fan Tutte, Zauberflöte, Tannhäuser, Rigoletto, Tosca and Andrea Chenier. The Verdi and Puccini performances were much admired in The Record Guide, but the discs were soon deleted and are now very rare.

Rothmüller made his debut in United States in 1948, at the New York City Opera. He often performed on concert and opera stages across the United States. He debuted at the Metropolitan Opera, New York City, in 1959 and performed there until 1961, and again in 1964/65.

In 1955 he was appointed as the professor of singing at Indiana University in Bloomington, Indiana.

His interest in Jewish music prompted him to research its history. He arranged the Sephardi folk songs, and in Zagreb in 1932, and Zurich in 1942, Rothmüller founded Omanut, society for the fostering of Jewish music. He was a master of the song interpretation. Rothmüller also wrote a book on the history of Jewish music.

In 1983 he edited and published his late brother Cvi Rotem's book, David Schwarz Tragödie des Erfinders Zur Geschichte des Luftschiffes.

== Personal life ==
Rothmüller was married to Ela (née Reiss) with whom he had two sons, Ilan and Daniel.

He died in Bloomington Indiana, on 20 January 1993, and was survived by his second wife, Margrit.

== Compositions ==
- Three Palestinian folk songs for mixed chorus and piano, Vienna 1931
- Hajimu Nahmanu Bjaliku u spomen for violin, viola and violoncello, Zagreb 1936
- Divertimento for solo trombone, timpani and string orchestra, London 1955
- Mit Shakespeares XXX. Sonett for string quartet, published in: C.T.Frey-Wehrlin, ur., Festschrift zum 60. Geburtstag C.A. Meier (Zürich, 1965) 9-13
- Religious Sephardic folk songs
- Symphony for strings
- Two string quartets
- Sonata for Double Bass (1980) Unpublished

== Scientific work ==
- Die Musik der Juden: Versuch einer geschichtlichen Darstellung ihrer Entwicklung (Zürich, 1951.)
- The Music of the Jews: An Historical Appreciation (London, 1953; New York, 1954 i 1960; Cranbury 1975.)
- Pronunciation of German Diction: Guidelines and Exercises for the Pronunciation of German in Speech and in Singing for Speakers of English (Bloomington, Indiana 1978.)

== Bibliography ==
- Snješka Knežević, Aleksander Laslo (2011). Židovski Zagreb. Zagreb: AGM, Židovska općina Zagreb. ISBN 978-953-174-393-8.
- Kraus, Ognjen (1998). Dva stoljeća povijesti i kulture Židova u Zagrebu i Hrvatskoj. Zagreb: Židovska općina Zagreb. ISBN 953-96836-2-9.
- Rotem, Cvi (1983). David Schwarz Tragödie des Erfinders Zur Geschichte des Luftschiffes. Bloomington: Indiana University Printing Services.
- Paul Suter (2005). "Marko Rothmüller". In Andreas Kotte (ed.). Theaterlexikon der Schweiz / Dictionnaire du théâtre en Suisse / Dizionario Teatrale Svizzero / Lexicon da teater svizzer [Theater Dictionary of Switzerland] (in German). Vol. 3. Zürich: Chronos. pp. 1533–1534. ISBN 978-3-0340-0715-3. LCCN 2007423414. OCLC 62309181.
