= Leslie Hurry =

British artist

Leslie George Hurry (10 February 1909– 20 November 1978) was a British artist and set designer for ballet, theatre and opera.

== Biography ==
Hurry was born in London, where his father, A. G. Hurry, was a funeral director in St John's Wood. Leslie Hurray was educated at Haberdashers' Aske's Boys' School before, resisting pressure to join the family business, he attended St. John's Wood Art School and the Royal Academy Schools. Leaving the Royal Academy School of Painting in 1931, before the completion of his five-year scholarship, his first commission was from a brewing firm to decorate a chain of saloon bars with landscape murals.

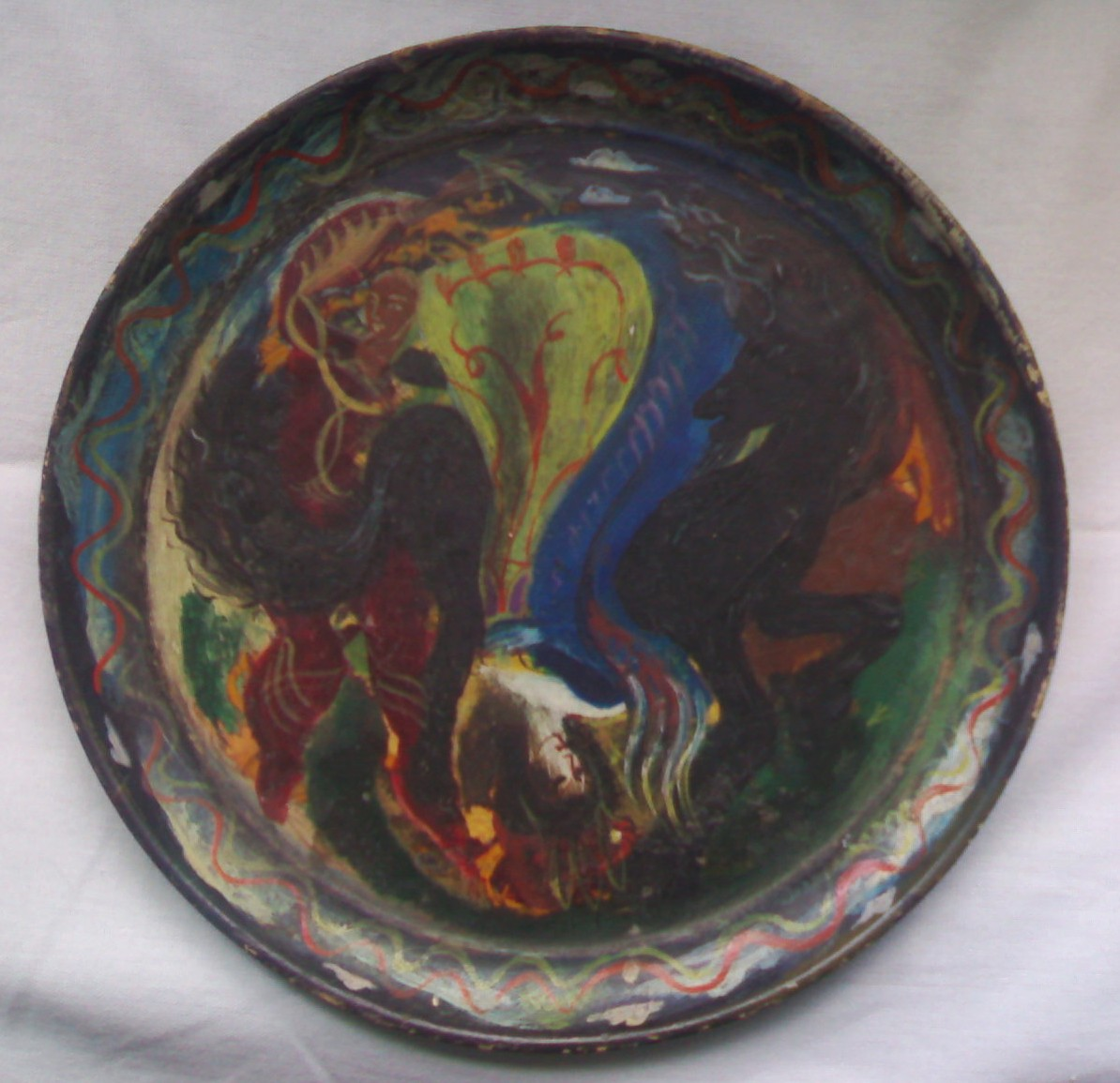
A papier-mâché tray by Hurry, showing a circus artiste hanging off the back of a black horse

In the second half of the 1930s he wandered Britain and Ireland painting landscapes. Depressed with his work and seeking inspiration to develop a personal style, he moved to Brittany then Paris, but was forced to return to Britain due to health problems.

In 1939, found unfit for military service and disturbed by the war, he isolated himself in his secluded cottage at [Buntings, Hundon,[Suffolk]. At this time he was befriended by Grace Sholto Douglas, an elderly patron of arts who died in 1942. In 1940–41 he produced two books of intricate automatic drawings that were exhibited at the Redfern Gallery, leading to his acclaim as an "ultra-surrealist".

His first stage work was for a production of Hamlet for the Sadler's Wells Ballet in 1942, work commissioned by Robert Helpmann, who had seen his paintings in a London gallery. He subsequently worked for Sadler's Wells, the Old Vic, Aldwych Theatre, Glyndebourne, the Royal Opera House, the Royal Shakespeare Company and the theatre in Canada, particularly in Stratford, Ontario.

He left a large corpus of paintings, including abstract, portraiture and landscape works.
