= Wilma Lipp =

Austrian soprano (1925–2019)

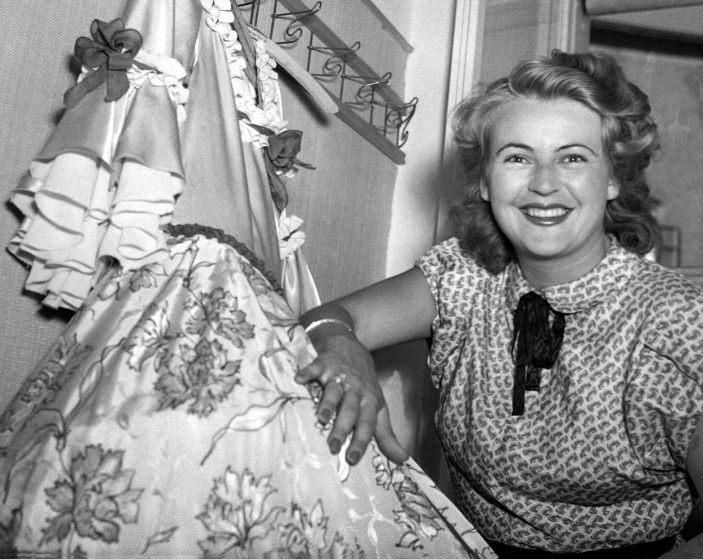
- In the wardrobe of the Festspielhaus during the Salzburg Festival in 1950
- Born: 26 April 1925; Vienna, Austria
- Died: 26 January 2019 (aged 93); Inning am Ammersee, Bavaria, Germany
- Occupations: Operatic soprano; Academic voice teacher
- Organizations: Vienna State Opera; Theater an der Wien
- Title: Kammersängerin (1953)
- Awards: Ehrenmedaille der Bundeshauptstadt Wien

Wilma Lipp ([vɪlma lɪp]; 26 April 1925 – 26 January 2019) was an Austrian operatic soprano and academic voice teacher. A long-time member of the Vienna State Opera, she was particularly associated with the role of the Queen of the Night in Mozart's Die Zauberflöte, a role she performed internationally more than 400 times. She was awarded the title Kammersängerin at age 28, and was an honorary member of the Vienna State Opera, among other honours.

== Career ==
Lipp studied in Vienna with Friedel Sindel, Paola Novikova, Anna Bahr-Mildenburg and Alfred Jerger, and also with Toti Dal Monte in Milan. She made her stage debut in Vienna as Rosina in Rossini's The Barber of Seville in 1943 in an open-air performance, and joined the Vienna State Opera in 1945. She won international attention as the Queen of the Night in Mozart's Die Zauberflöte in a 1948 performance conducted by Josef Krips. She sang the role then also at La Scala in Milan, at the Paris Opéra, in Hamburg and in Brussels, among others. In 1948, she appeared at the Salzburg Festival as Konstanze in Mozart's Die Entführung aus dem Serail. Her early roles in Vienna included Zerbinetta in Ariadne auf Naxos by Richard Strauss, Adele in Die Fledermaus by Johann Strauss, Olympia in Offenbach's Les Contes d'Hoffmann and Oscar in Verdi's Un ballo in maschera. She performed the title role in Donizetti's Lucia di Lammermoor with great success in Naples. In 1951, she sang at the Bayreuth Festival as the Forest Bird in Siegfried.

Lipp possessed a pure, supple high-soprano voice with an accurate coloratura technique and a so-called "white" tone. Her career, which began in soubrette and high coloratura roles, later progressed to more lyrical ones, such as Ilia in Mozart's Idomeneo, Countess Almaviva in his Figaro, Donna Elvira in his Don Giovanni, Pamina in his Die Zauberflöte, Eva in Wagner's Die Meistersinger von Nürnberg, Musetta in Puccini's La bohème, and the title roles of Flotow's Martha and Verdi's La traviata, among others.

She made her United States debut as Nanetta in Verdi's Falstaff at the San Francisco Opera in 1962. The same year she performed as Pamina with Herbert von Karajan at the re-opening at Theater an der Wien as a festival theatre. Lipp said that her years at this theatre were the "most happy" years of her life, because the acoustic was perfect for her as a young singer.

She performed for nearly 40 years on stage, at the Vienna State Opera (including 1945–55 at Theater an der Wien), around 1,200 evenings. Her most sung role was the Queen of the Night, with about 400 performances. She performed on many international opera houses, concert halls and festivals. In June 1981, she gave her farewell performance as Marianne Leitmetzerin in Der Rosenkavalier by Richard Strauss in Vienna with Karajan.

She taught voice at the Mozarteum in Salzburg from 1982 to 1998. She then retired and lived with her husband in Bavaria. She died at her home in Inning am Ammersee.

The director of the Vienna State Opera called her a leading member of the house during the time of Böhm and Karajan, a model in both in singing and voice pedagogy, who was able to perform both, devoted to the house but also pursuing an international career.

== Recordings ==
Lipp's first recording was the Queen of the Night in 1949. She also recorded this role with Karajan, Böhm, Krips, Wilhelm Furtwängler, Joseph Keilberth, and Wilhelm Schüchter. She recorded Pamina (Karajan, Schüchter), Konstanze (Krips, von Matacic), Elvira and Ilia. She also recorded operattas, both Adele and Rosalinde in Die Fledermaus by Johann Strauss, Laura in Millöcker's Der Bettelstudent, Pepi in Wiener Blut by Johann Strauss, Franzi in Ein Walzertraum by Oscar Straus, and the Briefchristl in Zeller's Der Vogelhändler. She recorded lieder recitals, Mozart's Requiem, and Ein deutsches Requiem by Johannes Brahms. Her last recording was as Leitmetzerin in 1983.

She is well represented in live recordings and radio broadcasts such as Musetta, Nanetta, Martha, the title role in Donizetti's La fille du régiment, Marguerite in Gounod's Faust, and many masses and oratorios. She has also appeared on TV (Live broadcast of Die Zauberflöte) and in films such as Unsterblicher Mozart (1954), The House of Three Girls (1958), The Cardinal (1963) and The Salzburg Festival (Tony Palmer, 2006).

== Awards ==
- 1953: Kammersängerin (deprecated: 1951, age 26)
- 1961: Austrian Decoration for Science and Art
- 1966: Nicolai Medal of the Vienna Philharmonic
- 1977: Honorary Medal of Vienna in gold
- 1982: Honorary Member of the Vienna State Opera
- 2004: Gold Medal for services to the city of Vienna
