= Günther Rennert =

German opera director (1911 - 1978)

Günther Rennert (1 April 1911 – 31 July 1978) was a German opera director and administrator.

== Life and career ==
Günther Rennert was born in Essen, Rhine Province on 1 April 1911. His brother was the conductor Wolfgang Rennert. He began his career as a film director in 1933, he then became involved in the operatic theatre, becoming an assistant to Walter Felsenstein at the Oper Frankfurt. From 1939-1942 he was a resident director at the Königsberg Theatre, and from 1942-1945 he was a resident director at the Berlin Städtische Oper. He directed a production of Ludwig van Beethoven's Fidelio for the opening of the Bavarian State Opera's 1945 season. He later staged that same opera at the Glyndebourne Festival in 1959.

In 1946 Rennert was appointed the administrative head of the Hamburg State Opera. There he directed two landmark productions of operas by Gioachino Rossini: The Barber of Seville and Il turco in Italia. These productions are credited with helping spark the bel canto revival of the mid twentieth century. In 1960 he was appointed joint artistic director of the Glyndebourne Festival with Vittorio Gui. During his tenure he directed productions of Rossini's La pietra del paragone, Handel's Jephtha, Strauss's Capriccio, Henze's Elegy for Young Lovers Mozart's Don Giovanni, Monteverdi's L'incoronazione di Poppea, and Cavalli's Ormindo.

Rennert finished his career as superintendent of the Bayerische Staatsoper from 1967 through 1977. He died in Salzburg, Austria on 31 July 1978.
