= Sena Jurinac =

Austrian opera singer (1921 – 2011)

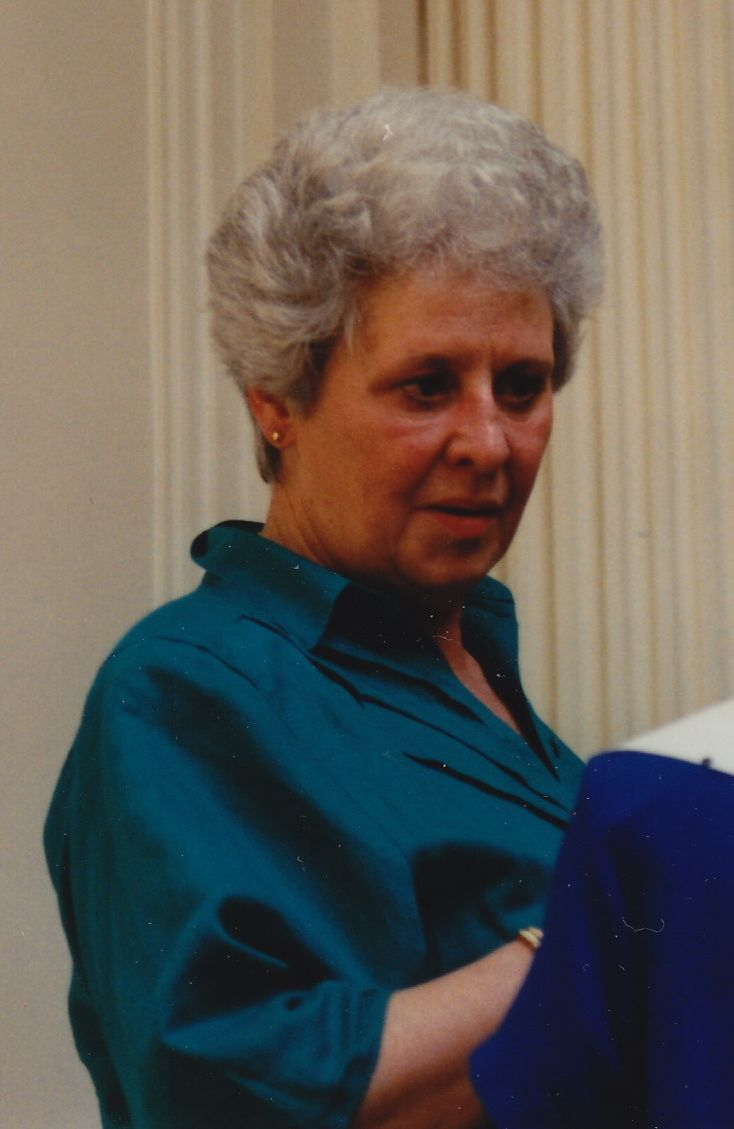
Sena Jurinac - Masterclasses Paris - Salle Gaveau May 1989

Srebrenka "Sena" Jurinac (Croatian pronunciation: [srêbreːŋka sěːna jurǐːnat͜s]) (24 October 1921 – 22 November 2011) was a Bosnian-born Austrian operatic soprano.

== Biography ==
Sena Jurinac was born on 24 October 1921 in Travnik, Bosnia-Herzegovina (then part of the Kingdom of Yugoslavia), the daughter of a Croatian father (a doctor) and a Viennese mother.

She studied at the Zagreb Academy of Music, and with Milka Kostrenčić. Her voice was pitched exactly between soprano and mezzo. Her repertoire included Poppea, Elisabetta (Don Carlos), Desdemona (Otello), Elisabeth (Tannhäuser), Ilia, Iphigenia, Jenůfa, Leonora (La forza del destino), the Composer (Ariadne auf Naxos), Marie (Wozzeck), Pamina (The Magic Flute), Mimi, Butterfly and Tosca. In many operas, her repertoire included more than one major role: Cherubino and Countess Almaviva, Donna Anna and Donna Elvira, Fiordiligi and Dorabella, Amor and Eurydice, Leonore and Marzelline (Fidelio), Marina and Fyodor (Boris Godunov); Octavian and the Marschallin. She also played supporting roles in The Ring of the Nibelung: Woglinde, Gutrune and several of the Norns.

She débuted as Mimi at Zagreb in 1942. In the following two years she sang the Countess, Freia, and Isabella in the première of Werner Egk's Columbus. In 1943, she was summer student of Anna von Mildenburg at the Salzburg Mozarteum. She appeared in the first Croatian sound movie, Lisinski (1944). In 1944, the Vienna State Opera engaged her, where she was first nicknamed "Sena". Conductor Karl Böhm's secretary suggested it because she feared the pronunciation of "Srebrenka" would cause difficulties for many Austrians. Because of the war, and the consequential closing of the opera three days after her arrival, she was unable to sing at the Vienna State Opera until 1946, when her first role was Cherubino. In the first year at the Staatsoper, she sang more than 150 performances. She remained associated with the company for almost four decades, receiving an honorary membership of the company with the title of Kammersängerin.

In the autumn of 1947, she appeared at Covent Garden with others of the Vienna company, singing Dorabella. Her Salzburg Festival début was in 1947. She appeared at La Scala as Cherubino, and became established as one of the Wiener Ensemble (together with Irmgard Seefried, Elisabeth Schwarzkopf, Christa Ludwig, Lisa della Casa, Anton Dermota and others). In 1951, she recorded Richard Strauss's Four Last Songs, shortly after Kirsten Flagstad had sung the world premiere in London.

She often visited England, where between 1951 and 1956 she sang the principal Mozart soprano roles at Glyndebourne, recording both the Countess in Figaro and Ilia in Idomeneo. She appeared regularly at Covent Garden between 1959 and 1963, singing Leonore in Fidelio under Otto Klemperer in 1961. Her American début was in the title role of Madama Butterfly, in San Francisco in 1959. Her portrayal of Octavian is preserved in the Paul Czinner film of Der Rosenkavalier, conducted by Herbert von Karajan with Schwarzkopf as the Marschallin. Her final operatic performance was as the Marschallin at the Vienna State Opera in November 1982. She continued to give recitals and master classes, and served on the juries of international singing competitions.

Jurinac was married twice. Her first marriage was to the Italian baritone Sesto Bruscantini from 1953 to 1956. The marriage ended in divorce. In 1965, she married Josef Lederle, and the marriage lasted until his death in 2005. She had no children.

== Decorations and awards ==
- 1961: Austrian Cross of Honour for Science and Art, 1st class
- 1967: Grand Decoration of Honour for Services to the Republic of Austria
- 1968: Honorary Ring of the Vienna State Opera
- 1971: Honorary Member of the Vienna State Opera
