= Sesto Bruscantini =

Italian operatic baritone singer (1919–2003)

- Sesto Bruscantini (photo with 1950 dedication)
- Occupation: opera singer

Sesto Bruscantini (10 December 1919 – 4 May 2003) was an Italian baritone, one of the greatest buffo singers of the post-war era, especially renowned in Mozart and Rossini.

== Biography and career ==
Bruscantini was born in Civitanova Marche, Marche, Italy. After obtaining a law degree, he turned to vocal studies in Rome, with Luigi Ricci at the Accademia Nazionale di Santa Cecilia. He won a vocal contest organized by RAI in 1947 and made his debut at La Scala in Milan in 1949, as Geronimo in Cimarosa's Il matrimonio segreto.

Bruscantini rapidly established himself in buffo roles in opera by Mozart and Rossini such as Le nozze di Figaro, Don Giovanni, Cosi fan tutte, Il turco in Italia, L'italiana in Algeri, Il barbiere di Siviglia, La Cenerentola but also in works by Donizetti such as L'elisir d'amore, La fille du régiment and Don Pasquale. In some of these works he often alternated roles, from Figaro to the Count in Nozze, Guglielmo to Alfonso in Cosi, Belcore to Dulcamara in Elisir, Malatesta to Pasquale in Don Pasquale, etc. He also took part in many revivals of opera by Pergolesi, Scarlatti and Cimarosa. He even recorded with Marilyn Horne the first modern performance of Antonio Vivaldi's Orlando Furioso.

In the 1960s, Bruscantini started singing more lyrical and dramatic roles in opera such as I puritani alternating between Riccardo and Giorgio, and La favorite singing both Alfonso and Baldasare. He also added Verdi roles such as Rigoletto, Germont in La Traviata, Simon Boccanegra, Melitone in La forza del destino, Rodrigo in Don Carlos and Ford in Falstaff.

Bruscantini was a regular guest at the Glyndebourne and Salzburg festivals, the Vienna State Opera, also appearing in Brussels, Monte Carlo, Paris, Madrid, and London. He sang relatively little outside Europe but did appear at the Lyric Opera of Chicago beginning in 1961 as Figaro in Il barbiere di Siviglia, and continuing in a total of 14 roles in 11 seasons through 1985-86.

From 1953 until 1956 Bruscantini was married to soprano Sena Jurinac, with whom he often appeared on stage in the 1950s. Both may be seen in their roles in Le nozze di Figaro in the 1955 film On Such a Night.

Bruscantini enjoyed a long and distinguished career, singing well into his 60s, making his belated Metropolitan Opera debut in 1981, as Taddeo in L'italiana in Algeri, in his two seasons at the Met he also sang Bartolo in Il barbiere di siviglia and Dulcamara in L'elisir d'amore. He also left an impressive discography, recording as late as 1986, the role of Don Romualdo in Donizetti's Emilia di Liverpool for Opera Rara.

Sesto Bruscantini died in his native Civitanova Marche, on 4 May 2003, aged 83.

== Videography ==
The Metropolitan Opera Centennial Gala, Deutsche Grammophon DVD, 00440-073-4538, 2009

== Sources ==
- Dictionnaire des interprètes, Alain Pâris, (Éditions Robert Laffont, 1989). ISBN 2-221-06660-X
- Guide de l’opéra, Les indispensables de la musique, R. Mancini & J-J. Rouvereux, (Fayard, 1989). ISBN 2-213-01563-5
