= 24th Academy Awards =

- Date: March 20, 1952
- Site: RKO Pantages Theatre, Hollywood, California
- Hosted by: Danny Kaye

Highlights
- Best Picture: An American in Paris
- Most awards: An American in Paris and A Place in the Sun (6)
- Most nominations: A Streetcar Named Desire (12)

The 24th Academy Awards were held on March 20, 1952, honoring the films from 1951 and the ceremony was hosted by Danny Kaye.

An American in Paris and A Place in the Sun each received six Oscars, splitting Best Picture and Best Director, respectively. A Streetcar Named Desire won four Oscars, including three of the four acting awards for which it was nominated. The film's only unsuccessful acting nomination was that of Marlon Brando, whose performance as Stanley Kowalski was later considered one of the most influential of modern film acting.

Humphrey Bogart was the last man born in the 19th century to win Best Actor. He won it over favored winner Marlon Brando, by the logic of the former being too long overlooked and the latter being a newcomer. The next day, Bogart remarked that "awards don't mean a thing unless every actor plays Hamlet and then who is best is decided."

An American in Paris became the second color film to win Best Picture, and was the first film since Grand Hotel to win Best Picture without any acting nominations. Its win was a surprise, as either A Streetcar Named Desire or A Place in the Sun was expected to win. Some reflected that it may have won due to the number of Academy voters employed by Metro-Goldwyn-Mayer at the time.

== Winners and nominees ==
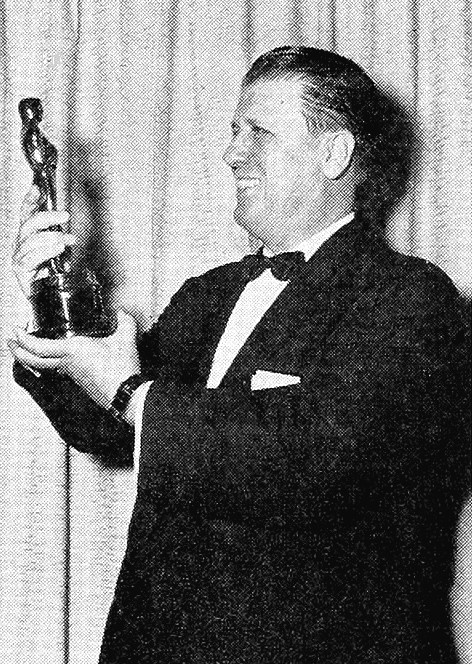
George Stevens; Best Director winner

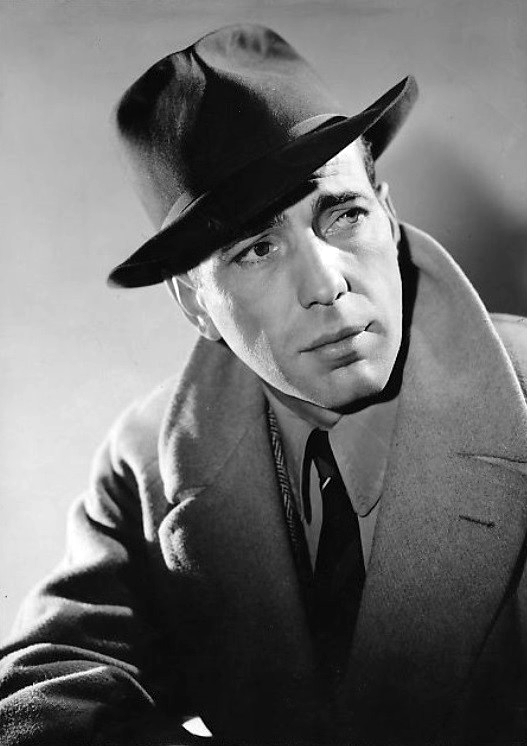
Humphrey Bogart; Best Actor winner

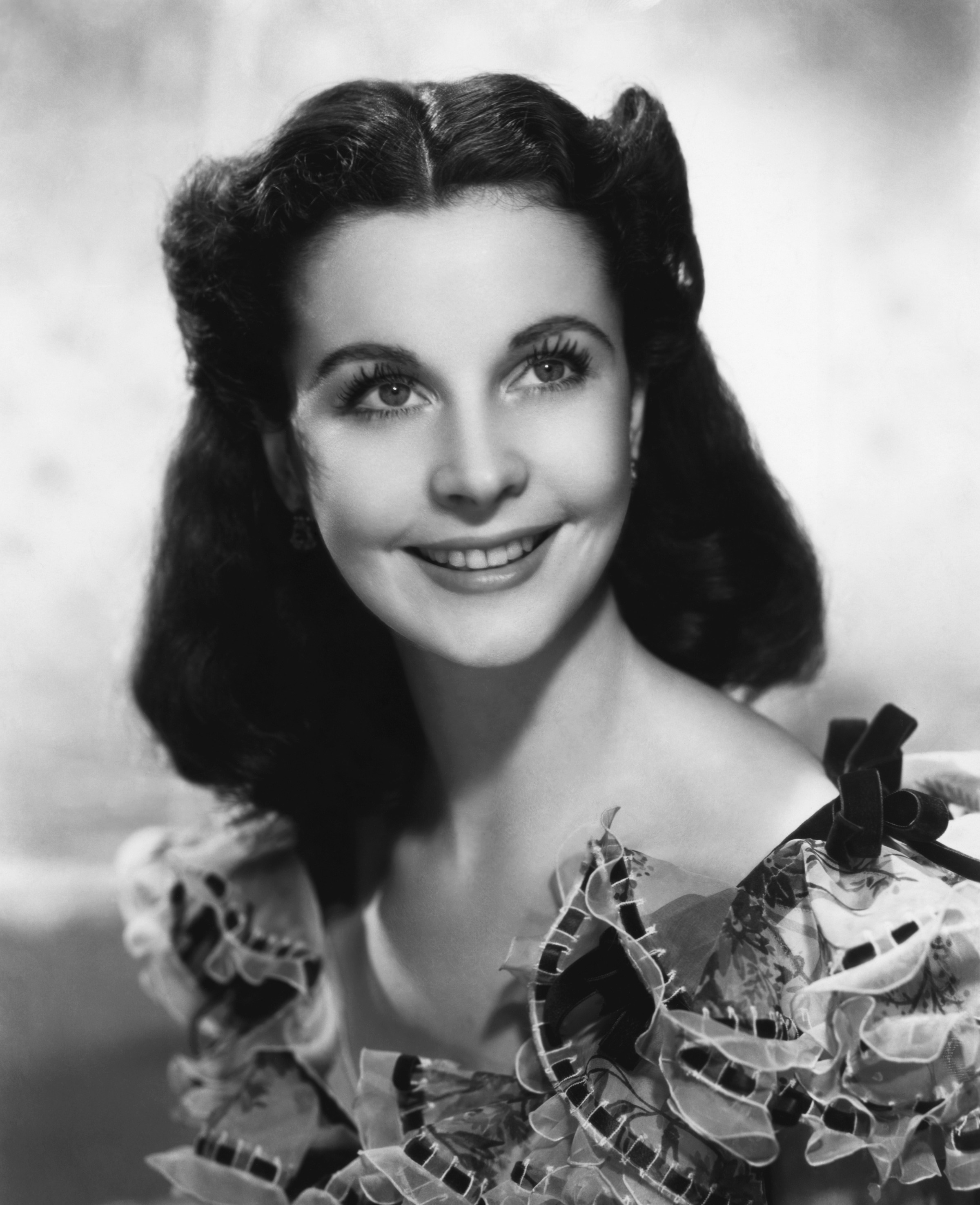
Vivien Leigh; Best Actress winner

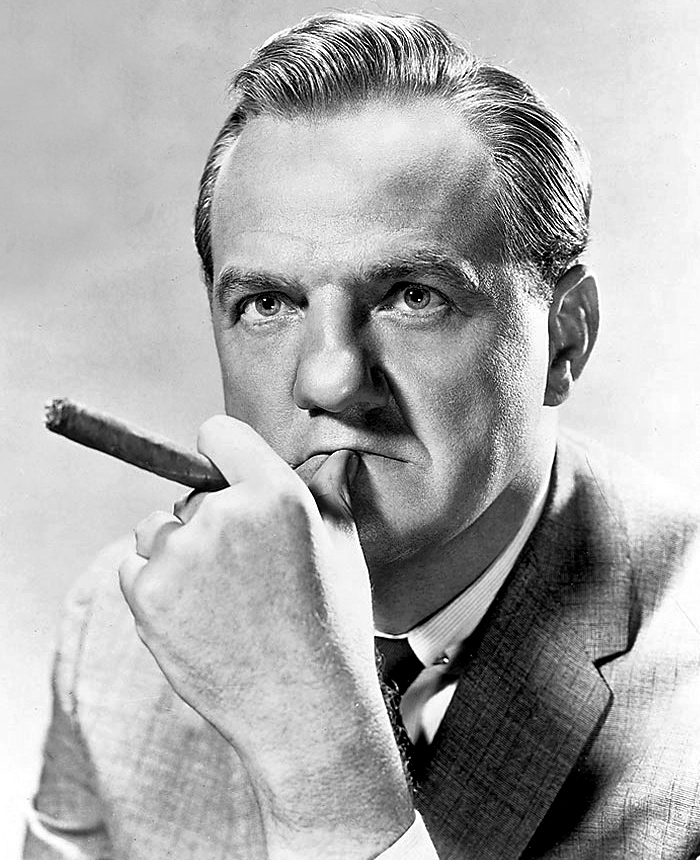
Karl Malden; Best Supporting Actor winner

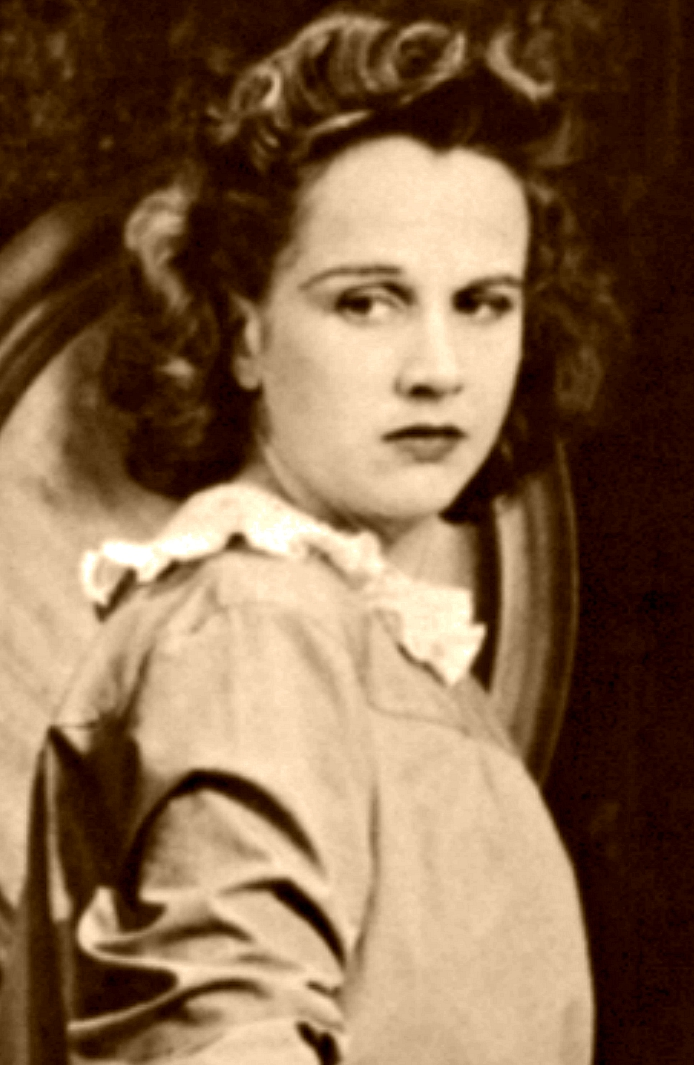
Kim Hunter; Best Supporting Actress winner

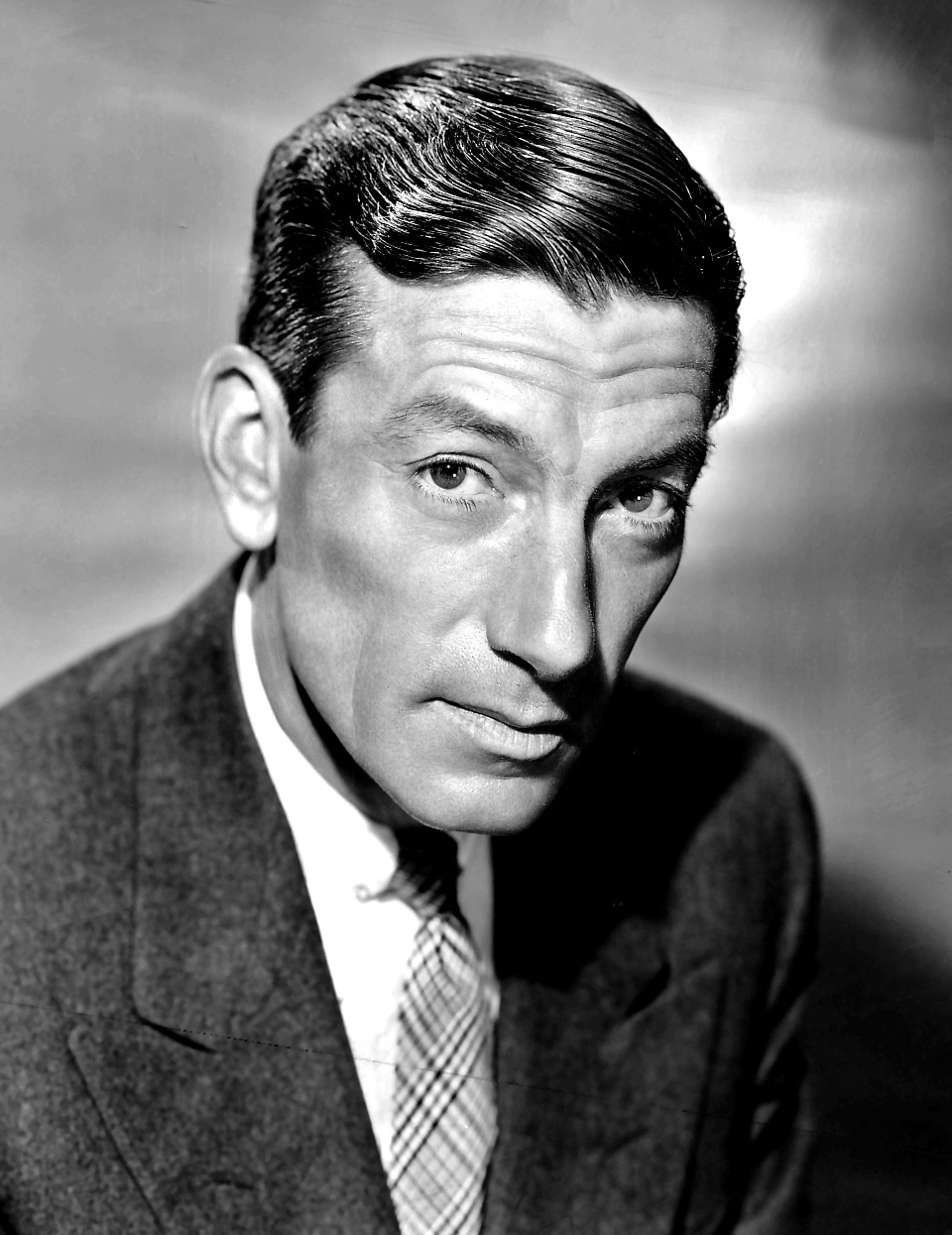
Hoagy Carmichael; Best Song co-winner

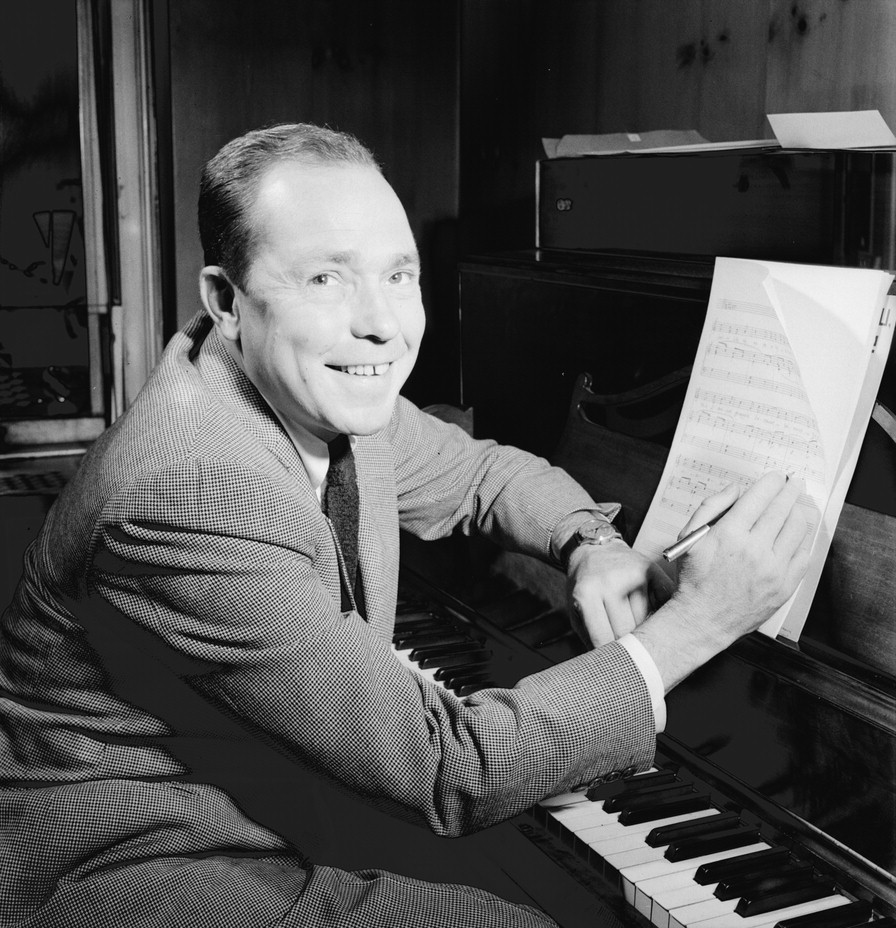
Johnny Mercer; Best Song co-winner

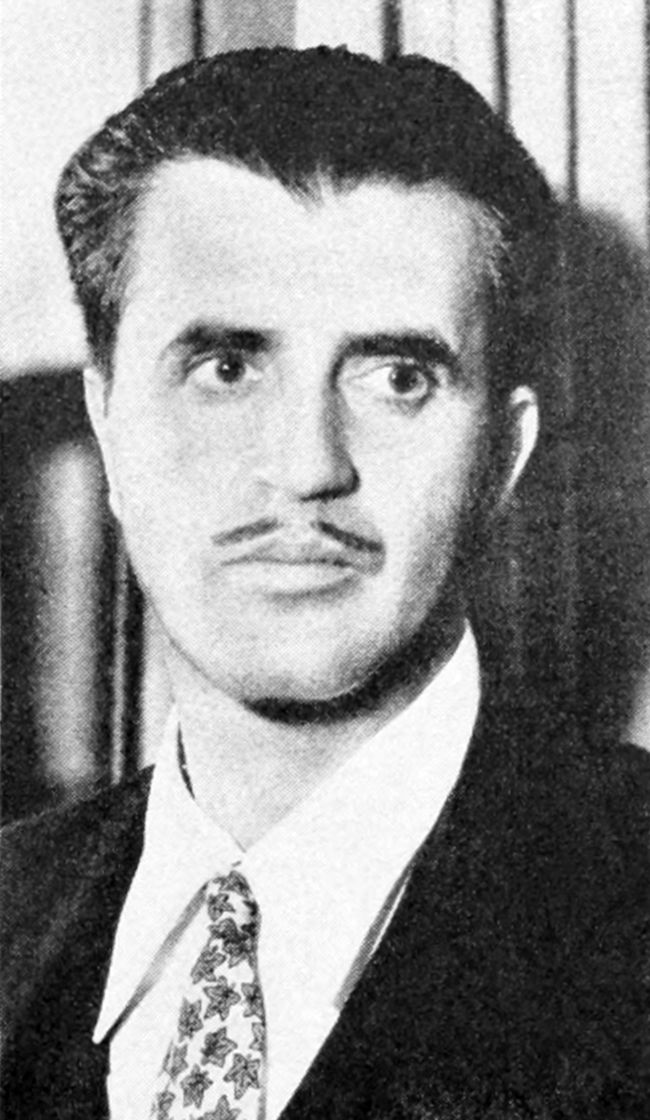
Cedric Gibbons; Best Art Direction, Color, co-winner

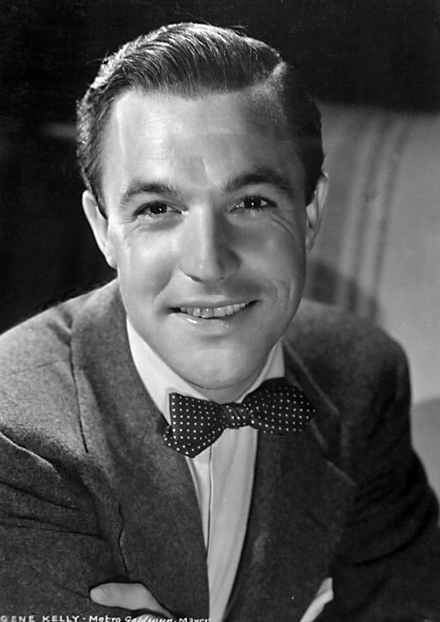
Gene Kelly; Academy Honorary Award recipient

=== Awards ===
Nominations were announced on February 11, 1952. Winners are listed first and highlighted in boldface.

**Best Motion Picture**: **An American in Paris – Arthur Freed for Metro-Goldwyn-Mayer**; Decision Before Dawn – Anatole Litvak and Frank McCarthy for 20th Century Fox; A Place in the Sun – George Stevens for Paramount Pictures; Quo Vadis – Sam Zimbalist for Metro-Goldwyn-Mayer; A Streetcar Named Desire – Charles K. Feldman for Warner Bros.	**Best Directing**: **George Stevens – A Place in the Sun**; John Huston – The African Queen; Vincente Minnelli – An American in Paris; William Wyler – Detective Story; Elia Kazan – A Streetcar Named Desire
**Best Actor**: **Humphrey Bogart – The African Queen as Charlie Allnut**; Marlon Brando – A Streetcar Named Desire as Stanley Kowalski; Montgomery Clift – A Place in the Sun as George Eastman; Arthur Kennedy – Bright Victory as Larry Nevins; Fredric March – Death of a Salesman as Willy Loman	**Best Actress**: **Vivien Leigh – A Streetcar Named Desire as Blanche Dubois**; Katharine Hepburn – The African Queen as Rose Sayer; Eleanor Parker – Detective Story as Mary McLeod; Shelley Winters – A Place in the Sun as Alice Tripp; Jane Wyman – The Blue Veil as LouLou Mason
**Best Actor in a Supporting Role**: **Karl Malden – A Streetcar Named Desire as Harold "Mitch" Mitchell**; Leo Genn – Quo Vadis as Petronius; Kevin McCarthy – Death of a Salesman as Biff Loman; Peter Ustinov – Quo Vadis as Nero; Gig Young – Come Fill the Cup as Boyd Copeland	**Best Actress in a Supporting Role**: **Kim Hunter – A Streetcar Named Desire as Stella Kowalski**; Joan Blondell – The Blue Veil as Annie Rawlins; Mildred Dunnock – Death of a Salesman as Linda Loman; Lee Grant – Detective Story as Shoplifter; Thelma Ritter – The Mating Season as Ellen McNulty
**Best Writing (Motion Picture Story)**: **Seven Days to Noon – Paul Dehn and James Bernard**; Bullfighter and the Lady – Budd Boetticher and Ray Nazarro; The Frogmen – Oscar Millard; Here Comes the Groom – Robert Riskin and Liam O'Brien; Teresa – Alfred Hayes and Stewart Stern	**Best Writing (Story and Screenplay)**: **An American in Paris – Alan Jay Lerner**; Ace in the Hole – Billy Wilder, Lesser Samuels and Walter Newman; David and Bathsheba – Philip Dunne; Go for Broke! – Robert Pirosh; The Well – Clarence Greene and Russell Rouse
**Best Writing (Screenplay)**: **A Place in the Sun – Michael Wilson and Harry Brown from An American Tragedy by Theodore Dreiser**; The African Queen – James Agee and John Huston from The African Queen by C. S. Forester; Detective Story – Philip Yordan and Robert Wyler from Detective Story by Sidney Kingsley; La Ronde – Jacques Natanson and Max Ophüls from Reigen by Arthur Schnitzler; A Streetcar Named Desire – Tennessee Williams from A Streetcar Named Desire by Tennessee Williams	**Best Documentary (Feature)**: **Kon-Tiki – Olle Nordemar**; I Was a Communist for the FBI – Bryan Foy
**Best Documentary (Short Subject)**: **Benjy – Fred Zinnemann, with the cooperation of Paramount Pictures Corporation for the Los Angeles Orthopaedic Hospital**; One Who Came Back – Owen Crump; The Seeing Eye – Gordon Hollingshead	**Best Short Subject (One-Reel)**: **World of Kids – Robert Youngson**; Ridin' the Rails – Jack Eaton; The Story of Time – Robert G. Leffingwell
**Best Short Subject (Two-Reel)**: **Nature's Half Acre – Walt Disney**; Balzac – Les Films du Compass; Danger Under the Sea – Tom Mead	**Best Short Subject (Cartoon)**: **The Two Mouseketeers – Fred Quimby**; Lambert the Sheepish Lion – Walt Disney; Rooty Toot Toot – Stephen Bosustow
**Best Music (Music Score of a Dramatic or Comedy Picture)**: **A Place in the Sun – Franz Waxman**; David and Bathsheba – Alfred Newman; Death of a Salesman – Alex North; Quo Vadis – Miklós Rózsa; A Streetcar Named Desire – Alex North	**Best Music (Scoring of a Musical Picture)**: **An American in Paris – Johnny Green and Saul Chaplin**; Alice in Wonderland – Oliver Wallace; The Great Caruso – Peter Herman Adler and Johnny Green; On the Riviera – Alfred Newman; Show Boat – Adolph Deutsch and Conrad Salinger
**Best Music (Song)**: **"In the Cool, Cool, Cool of the Evening" from Here Comes the Groom – Music by Hoagy Carmichael; Lyrics by Johnny Mercer**; "A Kiss to Build a Dream On" from The Strip – Music and Lyrics by Bert Kalmar (posthumous nomination), Harry Ruby and Oscar Hammerstein II; "Never" from Golden Girl – Music by Lionel Newman; Lyrics by Eliot Daniel; "Too Late Now" from Royal Wedding – Music by Burton Lane; Lyrics by Alan Jay Lerner; "Wonder Why" from Rich, Young and Pretty – Music by Nicholas Brodszky; Lyrics by Sammy Cahn	**Best Sound Recording**: **The Great Caruso – Douglas Shearer**; Bright Victory – Leslie I. Carey; I Want You – Gordon E. Sawyer; A Streetcar Named Desire – Nathan Levinson; Two Tickets to Broadway – John O. Aalberg
**Best Art Direction (Black-and-White)**: **A Streetcar Named Desire – Art Direction: Richard Day; Set Decoration: George James Hopkins**; Fourteen Hours – Art Direction: Lyle R. Wheeler and Leland Fuller; Set Decoration: Thomas Little and Fred J. Rode; The House on Telegraph Hill – Art Direction: Lyle R. Wheeler and John DeCuir; Set Decoration: Thomas Little and Paul S. Fox; La Ronde – Art Direction and Set Decoration: D'Eaubonne; Too Young to Kiss – Art Direction: Cedric Gibbons and Paul Groesse; Set Decoration: Edwin B. Willis and Jack D. Moore	**Best Art Direction (Color)**: **An American in Paris – Art Direction: Cedric Gibbons and E. Preston Ames; Set Decoration: Edwin B. Willis and F. Keogh Gleason**; David and Bathsheba – Art Direction: Lyle R. Wheeler and George Davis; Set Decoration: Thomas Little and Paul S. Fox; On the Riviera – Art Direction: Lyle R. Wheeler and Leland Fuller; Set Decoration: Thomas Little and Walter M. Scott; Musical Settings: Joseph C. Wright; Quo Vadis – Art Direction: William A. Horning, Cedric Gibbons and Edward Carfagno; Set Decoration: Hugh Hunt; Tales of Hoffmann – Art Direction and Set Decoration: Hein Heckroth
**Best Cinematography (Black-and-White)**: **A Place in the Sun – William C. Mellor**; Death of a Salesman – Franz Planer; The Frogmen – Norbert Brodine; Strangers on a Train – Robert Burks; A Streetcar Named Desire – Harry Stradling	**Best Cinematography (Color)**: **An American in Paris – Alfred Gilks; Ballet Photography by John Alton**; David and Bathsheba – Leon Shamroy; Quo Vadis – Robert Surtees and William V. Skall; Show Boat – Charles Rosher; When Worlds Collide – John F. Seitz and W. Howard Greene
**Best Costume Design (Black-and-White)**: **A Place in the Sun – Edith Head**; Kind Lady – Walter Plunkett and Gile Steele (posthumous nomination); The Model and the Marriage Broker – Charles LeMaire and Renié; The Mudlark – Edward Stevenson and Margaret Furse; A Streetcar Named Desire – Lucinda Ballard	**Best Costume Design (Color)**: **An American in Paris – Orry-Kelly, Walter Plunkett and Irene Sharaff**; David and Bathsheba – Charles LeMaire and Edward Stevenson; The Great Caruso – Helen Rose and Gile Steele (posthumous nomination); Quo Vadis – Herschel McCoy; Tales of Hoffmann – Hein Heckroth
**Best Film Editing**: **A Place in the Sun – William Hornbeck**; An American in Paris – Adrienne Fazan; Decision Before Dawn – Dorothy Spencer; Quo Vadis – Ralph E. Winters; The Well – Chester Schaeffer

=== Best Special Effects ===
- When Worlds Collide – Paramount.

=== Honorary Foreign Language Film Award ===
- To Rashomon - voted by the Board of Governors as the most outstanding foreign language film released in the United States during 1951.

=== Honorary Award ===
- To Gene Kelly in appreciation of his versatility as an actor, singer, director and dancer, and specifically for his brilliant achievements in the art of choreography on film.

=== Irving G. Thalberg Memorial Award ===
- Arthur Freed

== Presenters and performers ==
=== Presenters ===
- Lucille Ball (Presenter: Short Subject Awards)
- Charles Brackett (Presenter: Honorary Award to Gene Kelly)
- Leslie Caron (Presenter: Best Foreign Language Film)
- Marge and Gower Champion (Presenters: Best Art Direction)
- Cyd Charisse (Presenter: Best Sound Recording)
- Ronald Colman (Presenter: Best Actress)
- Sally Forrest (Presenter: Best Special Effects)
- Zsa Zsa Gabor (Presenter: Best Costume Design)
- Greer Garson (Presenter: Best Actor)
- Jesse L. Lasky (Presenter: Best Motion Picture)
- Claire Luce (Presenter: Writing Awards)
- Joseph L. Mankiewicz (Presenter: Best Director)
- George Murphy (Presenter: Scientific or Technical Awards)
- Donald O'Connor (Presenter: Music Awards)
- Janice Rule (Presenter: Documentary Awards)
- George Sanders (Presenter: Best Supporting Actress)
- Constance Smith (Presenter: Best Film Editing)
- Claire Trevor (Presenter: Best Supporting Actor)
- Vera-Ellen (Presenter: Best Cinematography)
- Darryl F. Zanuck (Presenter: Irving G. Thalberg Memorial Award)

=== Performers ===
- Kay Brown
- Dick Haymes
- Howard Keel and Jane Powell
- Jane Wyman

== Multiple nominations and awards ==
Films with multiple nominations
Nominations	Film
12	A Streetcar Named Desire
9	A Place in the Sun
8	An American in Paris
8	Quo Vadis
5	David and Bathsheba
5	Death of a Salesman
4	The African Queen
4	Detective Story
3	The Great Caruso
2	The Blue Veil
2	Bright Victory
2	Decision Before Dawn
2	The Frogmen
2	Here Comes the Groom
2	La Ronde
2	On the Riviera
2	Show Boat
2	The Tales of Hoffmann
2	The Well

Films with multiple awards
Awards	Film
6	An American in Paris
6	A Place in the Sun
4	A Streetcar Named Desire

== See also ==
- 9th Golden Globe Awards
- 1951 in film
- 3rd Primetime Emmy Awards
- 4th Primetime Emmy Awards
- 5th British Academy Film Awards
- 6th Tony Awards
