= The Tales of Hoffmann (1951 film) =

1951 film by Michael Powell and Emeric Pressburger

- Theatrical release poster
- Directed by: Michael Powell; Emeric Pressburger
- Written by: Michael Powell; Emeric Pressburger; Dennis Arundell (Note: English libretto); Jules Barbier (Note: French libretto); E. T. A. Hoffmann (Note: Stories (uncredited))
- Produced by: Michael Powell; Emeric Pressburger
- Starring: Moira Shearer; Robert Helpmann; Léonide Massine; Robert Rounseville; Pamela Brown; Ludmilla Tchérina; Ann Ayars
- Cinematography: Christopher Challis
- Edited by: Reginald Mills
- Music by: Jacques Offenbach
- Production companies: London Films; The Archers
- Distributed by: British Lion Films
- Release dates: 4 April 1951 (US trade); 17 May 1951 (UK trade); 26 November 1951 (UK release)
- Running time: 128 minutes; 136 minutes (2015 re-release)
- Country: United Kingdom
- Language: English
- Box office: £105,035 (UK rentals); $1.25 million (US rentals)

The Tales of Hoffmann is a 1951 British Technicolor opera anthology film written, produced and directed by the team of Michael Powell and Emeric Pressburger working under the umbrella of their production company The Archers. It is an adaptation of Jacques Offenbach's 1881 opera The Tales of Hoffmann, itself based on three short stories by E. T. A. Hoffmann.

The film stars Robert Rounseville, Moira Shearer, Robert Helpmann and Léonide Massine and features Pamela Brown, Ludmilla Tchérina and Ann Ayars. Only Rounseville and Ayars sang their own roles.

The film's soundtrack consists of music conducted by Sir Thomas Beecham and played by the Royal Philharmonic Orchestra. In addition to Rounseville and Ayars, singers included Dorothy Bond, Margherita Grandi, Monica Sinclair and Bruce Dargavel. The film's production team included cinematographer Christopher Challis and production and costume designer Hein Heckroth, who was nominated for two 1952 Academy Awards for his work.

== Plot summary ==
The film is arranged into a prologue, three acts or "tales," and an epilogue.

The prologue, and framing story, occurs in Nuremberg. Celebrated poet Hoffmann watches the object of his affection, prima ballerina Stella, perform in "The Ballet of the Enchanted Dragonfly". Stella sends Hoffmann a note asking him to meet her after the performance, but the note is intercepted by his rival, Councillor Lindorf. Hoffmann goes to a tavern in the interval, where, to entertain a throng of reverential students, he tells the story of a clown, Kleinzach, and three stories of his past loves—Olympia, Giulietta and Antonia—and gets drunk.

"The Tale of Olympia" takes place in Paris. Hoffman, then a naïve student himself, wanders into a shop run by magic spectacle maker Coppelius and scientist Spalanzani. The two conspire to get Hoffman to marry Olympia, an automaton crafted by Coppelius who appears alive along with the rest of the shop when Hoffman wears Coppelius' magic spectacles. Ignorant of her artifice, Hoffman declares his love to the doll. The scheme is foiled when Spalanzani cheats Coppelius out of the rights to Olympia's design and, in revenge, Coppelius tears his creation apart. Hoffman is mocked by all when he finally discovers that Olympia is "automatic".

"The Tale of Giulietta" follows Hoffman, "now a man of the world," who visits Venice and falls for Giulietta, a beautiful courtesan. Giulietta is a servant of black magician Dapertutto, who has used her to steal military officer Schlemil's shadow and soul. Dapertutto promises Giulietta jewels if she seduces Hoffman and takes his reflection, which she does. Hoffman realizes he has been deceived, but is challenged to a duel by the jealous Schlemil. Dapertutto attempts to use his magic to kill Hoffman during the duel, but it backfires and allows Hoffman to kill Schlemil instead. Hoffman shatters Giulietta's mirror and regains his reflection.

"The Tale of Antonia" brings Hoffman, now a renowned poet, to a Greek isle, housing consumptive soprano Antonia and her widowed father, talented conductor Crespel. Though Antonia must not sing, the evil Dr. Miracle appears and promises to cure her. He conjures the ghost of Antonia's mother, and forces Antonia to sing to her. Antonia's soul reunites with her mother's and she dies, breaking the hearts of Hoffmann and Crespel.

The epilogue returns the action to Nuremberg. It becomes apparent that Hoffman views Olympia, Giulietta, and Antonia as different aspects of his current love, Stella, and similarly sees Coppelius, Dapertutto, and Dr. Miracle as reflections of Lindorf. All in the tavern are stunned into silence by the force of his stories; even Lindorf appears to be moved. Stella appears, but, seeing Hoffmann drunk and incapacitated, is led away by Lindorf.

== Adaptation ==
Though the original French libretto is presented in an English translation, the film is relatively faithful to the traditional adaptations of Offenbach's last opera and incorporates his unfinished score with the thread of the plot. However, the score was "extensively cut and altered to fit in with the scenic demands of the film" in the process of adapting the story for the screen:

- All of Lindorf's music is omitted, making him a silent character.
- Stella's profession is changed: she is a ballerina rather than an opera singer; and she appears in "The Ballet of the Enchanted Dragonfly" rather than Mozart's Don Giovanni. This is also reflected in "The Tale of Olympia", where Olympia dazzles Hoffman with her dancing as well as her singing.
- "The Tale of Giulietta" is moved before "The Tale of Antonia". The Antonia sequence is itself shortened, ending with the powerful trio for Antonia, the ghost of her mother, and Dr. Miracle rather than Antonia's death scene.
- Most crucially, the role of Nicklaus, Hoffman's friend and servant, is abridged, though Nicklaus still appears. In the opera, Nicklaus is a Muse in disguise who tries to devote Hoffman to poetry rather than romance. In the opera's epilogue, the Muse reveals herself to Hoffman and convinces him to pledge his love to her rather than earthly women (represented by Stella).

== Cast ==
Role	Actor	Singer
Stella/Olympia	Moira Shearer	Dorothy Bond (Olympia)
Giulietta	Ludmilla Tchérina	Margherita Grandi
Antonia	Ann Ayars	Ann Ayars
Nicklaus	Pamela Brown	Monica Sinclair
Schlemil	Léonide Massine	Owen Brannigan
Spalanzani/Franz	Léonide Massine	Grahame Clifford
Lindorf/Coppélius/Dapertutto/Dr Miracle	Robert Helpmann	Bruce Dargavel
Kleinzach/Cochenille	Frederick Ashton	Murray Dickie (Cochenille)
Crespel	Mogens Wieth	Owen Brannigan
Hoffmann	Robert Rounseville	Robert Rounseville
Pitichinaccio	Lionel Harris	Murray Dickie
Andreas	Philip Leaver	
Luther	Meinhart Maur	Fisher Morgan
Stella's partner in Dragonfly ballet	Edmond Audran	
Antonia's mother		Joan Alexander
Nathaniel	John Ford (uncredited)	René Soames
Hermann	Richard Golding (uncredited)	Owen Brannigan

== Production ==
In the later years of his partnership with Pressburger, Powell became interested in what he termed "a composed film", a marriage of image to operatic music. The finale of Black Narcissus and the ballet sequence of The Red Shoes were earlier steps toward his goal.

The Tales of Hoffmann is an achievement of this ideal, as the entire opera was prerecorded to create the soundtrack and the film was edited to the rhythms of the music. The production is completely without dialogue and, with the exception of Robert Rounseville and Ann Ayars, none of the actors did their own singing. Some of the singers had established careers in Britain at the time. Grahame Clifford, for example, had been a leading comedian with the D'Oyly Carte Opera Company for several years. Kathleen Ferrier was offered the role of Nicklausse, but declined. but Monica Sinclair was fast becoming an audience favourite at Covent Garden; she would later become one of the company's most popular artists of the next two decades. The acting (especially by Helpmann) is highly stylised and similar to that of the silent-film era.

Each tale is marked by a primary colour denoting its theme. "The Tale of Olympia", set in Paris, has yellow contours highlighting the farcical nature and tone of the first act. "The Tale of Giulietta" is a hellish depiction of Venice, where dark colours, especially red, are used. The final tale, set in Greece, uses different shades of blue, alluding to its sad nature. The set design is deliberately made to look artificial with the costumes similarly stylised. The opening scene of the "Tale of Giulietta" (in which Giulietta performs the "Barcarolle", the most famous theme of the opera) is staged on a gondola that moves through deliberately artificial Venetian canals, although it does not seem to actually move on the water.

The Tales of Hoffmann was in production from 1 to 16 July 1950 at Shepperton Studios in Shepperton, Surrey.

== Reception ==
=== Critical response ===
Following the film's world premiere in New York City, Bosley Crowther of The New York Times wrote:

[D]espite its opulence, coupled with a brilliant rendering of the score by the Royal Philharmonic Orchestra under Sir Thomas Beecham's bristling baton and some masterly singing of the libretto (in English) by a host of vocal cords, this film version of the opera is, in toto, a vastly wearying show. And that is because it sates the senses without striking any real dramatic fire ... The inevitable question about this picture is how close does it come to matching the beauty and excitement of the same producers [sic] The Red Shoes? Although the two films are basically different, a comparison is fair to this extent: The Red Shoes had warmth and vitality, Tales of Hoffmann is splendid and cold.

Reportedly, Cecil B. DeMille sent a letter to Powell and Pressburger saying: "For the first time in my life, I was treated to Grand Opera where the beauty, power and scope of the music was equally matched by the visual presentation."

For the 2002 Sight and Sound poll, George A. Romero called it his "favourite film of all time; the movie that made me want to make movies." Three years earlier, Romero had introduced the film as part of the "Dialogues: Talking with Pictures" programme at the 1999 Toronto International Film Festival. Romero later taped an interview for the Criterion Collection edition, discussing his love of the film and its influence on his career. Martin Scorsese, an ardent fan of Powell and Pressburger, provides an audio commentary track on the Criterion edition.

In a book on the British cinema, André Bazin is quoted as saying:

The cinema thus creates here a new artistic monster: the best legs adorned by the best voice. Not only is opera liberated from its material constraints but also from its human limitations. Lastly, dance itself is renewed by the photography and the editing, which allows a kind of choreography of the second degree where the rhythm of the dance is served by that of the cinema.

For the 2015 re-release, with the additional nine minutes of the Antonia section and extended curtain calls, the Opera critic hailed the "famous cinematic coups — the visceral dismembering of Moira Shearer’s Olympia doll, eyelashes a-flutter; Antonia’s virtual leap into a vertiginous abyss; the mirror effects of the Venetian act" as "new-minted and breathtaking as ever". Describing it as a "legendary film", he added that the "over-the-top Expressionism of the circular-studio production, the detail of Heckroth’s profoundly ravishing designs, the Ballets Russes homage of Massine’s tireless choreography, all come over with a vitality enhanced by the passing years".

=== Accolades ===
At the 24th Academy Awards, The Tales of Hoffmann received two nominations, both for Hein Heckroth, for Best Art Direction-Set Decoration, Color and Best Costume Design, Color; the awards in both cases went to the crew of An American in Paris.

Powell and Pressburger were nominated for the Grand Prize of the 1951 Cannes Film Festival winning a special prize (Prix Exceptionnel); the Commission supérieure technique [de l’image et du son] awarded it a prize for technical achievement. They also won the Silver Bear award for best musical at the 1st Berlin International Film Festival.

== Soundtrack ==
The soundtrack was recorded at Shepperton Studios between May and September 1950, conducted by Sir Thomas Beecham. Decca obtained permission from London Films to release the soundtrack album. In response, Beecham sued, as he had not approved the release because the soundtrack did not truly represent his interpretation of the opera because of the changes made for the film. On 20 March 1951, he failed to obtain a high court injunction to prevent the release but received assurances that the album would be clearly labelled as having been taken from the soundtrack.

== 2015 re-release ==
In March 2015, the 4K restoration of the film, produced by Martin Scorsese's The Film Foundation, the British Film Institute and Studiocanal, was released in the U.S. by Rialto Pictures. The restored version runs 136 minutes, including a final credits sequence of all the performers and singers not seen in any previous releases.
