= John William Warde =

American suicide victim

John William Warde was a 26-year-old American bank clerk from Southampton, New York, who committed suicide on July 26, 1938. He leaped from a window ledge of the 17th floor of the Gotham Hotel at 5th Avenue and 55th Street in Manhattan. The son of a Long Island express agent, his 12-hour dilemma before jumping held 300 New York City Police Department officers at bay. They were afraid of making a bold move that might cause Warde to jump.

== Background ==
John William Warde worked as a bank clerk in Southampton until he survived a suicide attempt with a knife in July 1937 and spent three months in the Central Islip Psychiatric Center. A note on the discharge papers of the asylum in November 1937 declared:

The patient's manic-depressive psychosis seems to have arrested itself.

After Warde's discharge, he returned to the home at 25 Willow Street, Southampton, where he lived with his parents. Eight days before his suicide, Warde was observed on a bridge outside Hampton Bays, New York, staring over the edge into the water. A bridge tender chased him away and contacted the authorities, giving them Warde's license plate number. The police checked on him at his home and spoke with him.

On Tuesday morning, July 26, 1938, after spending a long weekend in Chicago, Warde, his sister Katherine and two friends of the family surnamed Valentine checked in to room 1714 on the 17th floor of the Gotham Hotel in midtown Manhattan. During a conversation, his sister suggested making an appointment for him with a psychiatrist he already had seen. Her comment apparently upset him. He dashed for a window and then occupied the ledge balancing there from late in the morning until 10:38 pm.

Neither of Warde's parents had joined the group for the trip to Chicago, and neither was in the Gotham Hotel when Warde's sister made the comment that upset him. Their father, John A. Warde, was vacationing in Vermont, contacted by telephone there and told, many hours before his son jumped, about the suicidal gesture.

== Chronology of death ==
Warde on the ledge of the Gotham Hotel as his sister pleads with him to come in

400 police officers and NYPD personnel responded to the emergency together with members of the Fire Department and volunteer helpers. Psychiatrist J. C. Presner was called by hotel management to make a plea to Warde, who was believed to be clinically depressed. Presner dropped a half-milligram of Benzedrine in glass after glass of water that Warde drank when NYPD Patrolman Charles V. Glasco handed each to him. Presner, aware that an apparently dehydrated Warde was repeatedly asking for and drinking water, hoped the successive very small doses of Benzedrine would alleviate his melancholia. Evidently, they did not.

Patrolman Glasco was a Woodhaven, Queens resident whose NYPD job was in the “First District Traffic Summons Squad,” as the New Yorker reported many years later. At noon, Glasco was helping the NYPD sergeant who supervised him control the traffic jam that already had started outside the Gotham Hotel as a result of numerous pedestrians and motorists trying to look at whatever was going on. Both Glasco and the NYPD sergeant, standing on the street, noticed John Warde’s sister Katherine pleading with him to return to their room while she stuck her head through the window opening near Warde. (Room 1714 was used regularly by a wealthy Southampton, Long Island family surnamed Valentine that had befriended Warde in 1937 following a suicide attempt he had made that year. The room contained only one window.) Immediately wanting to help, NYPD Patrolman Glasco decided to pose as a civilian and then talk with Warde. The sergeant, agreeing this was a good plan, told Glasco, “You always was a pretty fair actor. It’s worth trying, anyhow. Go on up to Room 1714 and tell the lieutenant I sent you. …”

Donning a bellhop uniform he borrowed from a bellhop in the lobby, Glasco entered Room 1714 and attempted to persuade Warde not to jump by talking to him on-and-off for ten-and-a-half hours. They discussed baseball, ping pong, the merits of night-versus-day picnics, and other subjects. Glasco told Warde that this was his first day on the new job as bellhop, and that if he jumped, it would be bad for business and the Gotham Hotel management would have to fire him. Glasco hoped that his multiple servings of water and cigarettes that Warde consumed would enable himself to get close enough to Warde to grab him. Because Warde insisted upon watching Glasco drink from every glass of water before he himself drank the rest of it, that meant Glasco, too, ingested the half-milligram of Benzedrine that each glass of water contained.

Warde disclosed a secret to Glasco during their time together. Glasco never revealed this secret to anyone, not even many years later, and it is unknown what the secret was. Eventually, Glasco allegedly persuaded Warde to move away from the ledge and return to Room 1714. As Warde was exiting the ledge and re-entering the hotel room, a photographer attempted to photograph Warde, causing him to jump off the ledge.. This was at least the second occasion when Warde felt betrayed by Glasco’s many assurances that he could have privacy were he to change his mind about jumping. Previously, a peculiarly dressed “gaunt” [as described by the New Yorker magazine many years later] man who claimed to be a priest had defied police orders to stay out of Room 1714, and Warde, staring through the open window space after sunset, had seen the strange man and had returned to his precarious position on the ledge.

Warde leaped feet-first at 10:38 pm, crashing into the glass marquee of the 55th Street entrance of the Gotham Hotel. His body smashed to the sidewalk. When he jumped, 10,000 people were gathered at the busy intersection of 55th Street and Fifth Avenue. Collectively, they shouted "Here he comes!" before becoming silent at the moment Warde made his plunge.

== Burial ==
Warde was buried in Cemetery of the Evergreens, Brooklyn, following a private funeral service at the New York and Brooklyn Funeral Home, located at 187 South Oxford Street in Brooklyn. His parents and two friends were present at the service. The service was pushed ahead four hours from a previously arranged time so as to avoid crowds.

== Film adaptation ==
Writer Joel Sayre wrote about the Warde suicide in The New Yorker in an article entitled "That Was New York: The Man on the Ledge", published on April 16, 1949. The story was purchased by Twentieth Century Fox.

The Sayre article was adapted by Fox into the 1951 film Fourteen Hours, with Richard Basehart as the man on the ledge and Paul Douglas as the police officer who tries to talk him out of jumping. As originally shot, the film ended as in reality, with the man jumping to his death. After a preview, this was changed to end with his falling accidentally and grabbing the net to save his life.

The studio changed the title from The Man on the Ledge to Fourteen Hours at the request of Warde's mother, so that the picture would not be as closely identified with her son. Studio chief Darryl F. Zanuck considered changing the setting of the movie to another city for the same reason, but it was ultimately filmed in New York. Various details about Officer Glasco's life were also fictionalized in the film.
