= Meoni =

Meoni is an Italian surname. Notable people with this surname include:

- Fabrizio Meoni (1957–2005), Italian off-road and rallying motorcycle racer
- Giovanni Meoni, Italian operatic baritone
- Marco Meoni (born 1973), Italian volleyball player
- Mario Meoni (1965–2021), Argentine politician
