= Macbeth discography =

Audio and video recordings of Verdi's opera

This is a list of recordings of Macbeth, an opera by Giuseppe Verdi. The first performance of the work was on 14 March 1847 at the Teatro della Pergola in Florence. Verdi subsequently revised the work and the first performance of this version was on 21 April 1865 at the Théâtre Lyrique in Paris.

Some recordings and some performances today incorporate both Macbeth's final aria before he dies (from the original version) and the revised version's ending with the soldiers' chorus.

== 1847 original version ==
Year	Cast (Macbeth, Lady Macbeth, Banco, Macduff)	Conductor, opera house and orchestra	Label
1978	Peter Glossop, Rita Hunter, John Tomlinson, Kenneth Collins	John Matheson; BBC Concert Orchestra and BBC Singers	CD: Opera Rara; Cat: ORCV 301
2018	Giovanni Meoni, Nadja Michael, Fabrizio Beggi, Giuseppe Valentino Buzza	Fabio Biondi; Europa Galante	CD:Glossa Music; Cat:GCD923411

== 1865 revised version ==
Year	Cast (Macbeth, Lady Macbeth, Macduff, Banco)	Conductor, opera house and orchestra	Label
1947	Francesco Valentino, Margherita Grandi, Walter Midgley, Italo Tajo	Berthold Goldschmidt; Scottish Orchestra, Glyndebourne Festival Chorus (Live recording from Edinburgh Festival, 27 August 1947)	CD: Classical Recordings Quarterly Editions; Cat: CRQ CD004-5
1951	Ivan Petroff, Astrid Varnay, Gino Penno, Italo Tajo	Vittorio Gui; Chorus and Orchestra of the Teatro Communale di Firenze (Live performance May 6)	Operadepot-dot-com; Cat: CD-10939-2
1952	Enzo Mascherini, Maria Callas, Gino Penno, Italo Tajo	Victor de Sabata; La Scala Chorus and Orchestra (Live recording of 7 Dec. performance)	CD: Myto; Cat: MCD 063 H 115
1959	Leonard Warren, Leonie Rysanek, Carlo Bergonzi, Jerome Hines	Erich Leinsdorf; Metropolitan Opera Chorus and Orchestra	LP: RCA Victrola; Cat: VICS-6121; CD: RCA Victor; Cat: 4516-2-RG
1960	Giuseppe Taddei, Leyla Gencer, Mirto Picchi, Ferrucio Mazzoli	Vittorio Gui; Teatro Massimo Chorus and Orchestra	CD: Great Opera Performances (GOP); Cat: B00HYKI61Y
1964	Giuseppe Taddei, Birgit Nilsson, Bruno Prevedi, Giovanni Foiani	Thomas Schippers, Accademia di Santa Cecilia Orchestra and Chorus	CD: Decca; Cat: 433 039-2
1970	Dietrich Fischer-Dieskau, Elena Souliotis, Luciano Pavarotti, Nicolai Ghiaurov	Lamberto Gardelli, London Philharmonic Orchestra and Ambrosian Opera Chorus	CD: Decca; Cat: 440 048-2
1976	Piero Cappuccilli, Shirley Verrett, Plácido Domingo, Nicolai Ghiaurov	Claudio Abbado, Coro e Orchestra del Teatro alla Scala	CD: Deutsche Grammophon; Cat: 449 732-2
1976	Sherrill Milnes, Fiorenza Cossotto, José Carreras, Ruggero Raimondi	Riccardo Muti, New Philharmonia Orchestra and Ambrosian Opera Chorus	CD: EMI; Cat: CMS 5 67128-2
1986	Leo Nucci, Shirley Verrett, Veriano Luchetti, Samuel Ramey	Riccardo Chailly, Teatro Comunale di Bologna Orchestra and Chorus	CD: Decca; Cat: 417 525-2; DVD: Decca, Cat: 073 4380 and 1040309 (US)
1986	Piero Cappuccilli, Sylvia Sass, Péter Kelen, Kolos Kováts	Lamberto Gardelli, Hungarian Radio and Television Chorus and Budapest Symphony Orchestra	CD: Hungaroton; Cat: HCD 12738-40
1987	Renato Bruson, Mara Zampieri, Neil Shicoff, Robert Lloyd	Giuseppe Sinopoli, Orchester und Chor der Deutsche Oper Berlin (Live recording on video)	DVD: ArtHaus Musik; Cat: 100 141
1992	Renato Bruson, Gwyneth Jones, Alberto Cupido, Roberto Scandiuzzi	Gustav Kuhn, Tokyo Philharmonic Orchestra (Live recording)	CD: Eurostar Sine Qua Non; Cat: 39820242DDD
2001	Thomas Hampson, Paoletta Marrocu, Luis Lima, Roberto Scandiuzzi	Franz Welser-Möst, Chorus and Orchestra of the Zürich Opera House (Live recording)	DVD: TDK; Cat: DV-OPMAC
2006	Leo Nucci, Sylvie Valayre, Roberto Iuliano, Enrico Iori	Bruno Bartoletti, Teatro Regio di Parma (Performed in October) (Directed by Liliana Cavani, video direction by Andrea Bevilacqua)	Blu-ray: C Major; DVD: Cat: 722008
2008	Željko Lučić, Maria Guleghina, Dimitri Pittas, John Relyea	James Levine, Metropolitan Opera Orchestra, Chorus, and Ballet (Live recording of 12 January performance, production by Adrian Noble)	HD video: Met Opera on Demand; DVD: EMI Classics; Cat: 2063049
2011	Simon Keenlyside, Liudmyla Monastyrska, Dimitri Pittas, Raymond Aceto	Antonio Pappano, Chorus and Orchestra of the Royal Opera House (Stage director: Phyllida Lloyd; recorded live, June)	HD video: Royal Opera Stream; Blu-ray/DVD: Opus Arte
2014	Željko Lučić, Anna Netrebko, Joseph Calleja, René Pape	Fabio Luisi, Metropolitan Opera Orchestra, Chorus, and Ballet (Live recording of 11 October performance, production by Adrian Noble)	HD video: Met Opera on Demand; Blu-ray: DGG
