= 1952 Academy Awards =

1952 Academy Awards may refer to:

- 24th Academy Awards, the Academy Awards ceremony that took place in 1952
- 25th Academy Awards, the 1953 ceremony honoring the best in film for 1952
