= Nora Sayre =

American film critic (1932–2001)

- Born: Nora Clemens Sayre; September 20, 1932; Hamilton, Bermuda
- Died: August 8, 2001 (aged 68); New York City, U.S.
- Occupations: Film critic; journalist; historian
- Spouse: Robert Neild (m. 1957; div. 1961)

Nora Clemens Sayre (September 20, 1932 – August 8, 2001) was an American film critic, journalist, and cultural historian. In the 1960s, she was U.S. correspondent for the New Statesman magazine. In the 1970s, she reviewed films for The New York Times. As a historian, she studied the effects of the Cold War on American culture. She authored several books, including Running Time: Films of the Cold War (1982), in which she focused on Hollywood moviemaking in the 1950s. Her first book, Sixties Going on Seventies (1973), was a National Book Award nominee.

== Personal life ==
Nora Sayre was born in Hamilton, Bermuda in 1932. She was the only child of Joel Sayre, a screenwriter, novelist, and reporter, and Gertrude Lynahan, also a reporter. Nora grew up surrounded by notable writers; family friends included A. J. Liebling, Edmund Wilson, Dorothy Parker, and Graham Greene. She attended Friends Seminary, and graduated from Radcliffe College in 1954.

Next, she spent five years in England. She said that when she felt homesick, she would pay a call on blacklisted American screenwriter Donald Ogden Stewart who was living in exile in London; he was another famous writer she had met as a child. In 1956 she befriended American photojournalist Walker Evans who was in London to cover British sporting events.

In 1957 she married British economist Robert Neild, but the marriage was dissolved four years later.

Nora Sayre died on August 8, 2001, at Lenox Hill Hospital in Manhattan. The cause of death was emphysema. She was 68.

== Career ==
While in England, Sayre earned a living as a freelance journalist. She wrote for the New Statesman and BBC radio about late 1950s cultural happenings, such as the "angry young men" group of working-class writers. She also sought to explain American culture to a British audience.

After returning to New York, she worked as a U.S. correspondent for the New Statesman from 1965 to 1970. In addition, she contributed articles to The New York Times Book Review, The Nation, and Esquire magazine. From 1973–1975, she was the daily film reviewer for The New York Times.

Her most successful book was Sixties Going on Seventies, a compilation of her magazine articles on key American events and political figures from that time period. Published in 1973, it was nominated for the 1974 National Book Award in the Contemporary Affairs category. Sayre provided updated commentary for a revised edition of the book in 1996.

As a historian, she was particularly interested in Cold War culture. She gave a series of lectures entitled "Hollywood and the Cold War" for the Film Department of New York City's Museum of Modern Art. In 1982 she published Running Time: Films of the Cold War in which she discussed dozens of American films made during World War II and the height of the Second Red Scare and Cold War. She examined recurring themes and messages she found in those films and noted how, in her words, "the mentalities of the period were reflected on the screen".

Starting in 1981, Sayre taught courses on nonfiction writing and journalism in the Writing Program at Columbia University. Among her own writing mentors, she listed the English critic and book reviewer John Davenport, whom she had met as a child when he was a screenwriter for MGM. He would later visit the adult Sayre with suggestions of things she should read and write about. She recalled, "after a dose of Davenport, one was all the more responsive to words—either to classical or contemporary prose, or to the random eloquence of the street... his conversation made one immediately want to go home and write. Hence he served as an igniter: He gave one momentum."

In her last decade she published another Cold War history, Previous Convictions: A Journey Through the 1950s (1995), as well as a memoir, On the Wing: A Young American Abroad (2001).

== Legacy ==
The Nora Sayre Endowed Residency for Nonfiction was created at Yaddo, an artists' community in Saratoga Springs, New York, to support her literary legacy.

== Bibliography ==
- (1973) Sixties Going on Seventies (Arbor House) ISBN 978-0877950547
- (1982) Running Time: Films of the Cold War (The Dial Press) ISBN 978-0385276214
- (1995) Previous Convictions: A Journey Through the 1950s (Rutgers University Press) ISBN 978-0813522319
- (1996) Sixties Going on Seventies: Perspectives on the Sixties (Rutgers University Press) ISBN 978-0813521930 – Revised edition
- (2001) On the Wing: A Young American Abroad (Counterpoint) ISBN 978-1582431444
