= Margherita Grandi =

Australian-born Italian opera singer (1892–1972)

External images
- The young Grandi
- Grandi, c. 1940

Margherita Grandi (10 October 1892 (Note: Some sources give her birthdate as 4 October 1894.) – 29 January 1972) was an Australian-born Italian dramatic soprano.

== Life and career ==
Margherita Grandi was born Margaret Gard in Harwood Island, Clarence River, near Maclean, in the Northern Rivers area of New South Wales, Australia. When she was ten, her family moved to Tasmania and she went to school in Hobart. She left Australia in 1911 to study at the Royal Conservatory of Music in London. She also studied with Mathilde Marchesi and Jean de Reszke, and later in Paris with Emma Calvé. She made her professional debut in Paris, as a mezzo-soprano under the stage name of Djéma Vécla (Vecla being an anagram of Calvé) (Note: Not to be confused with the French singer Emma Vecla who adopted that stage name for the same reason (student of Calvé) and whose biography has many parallels.) singing Charlotte in Massenet's Werther. In 1922, she created Massenet's Amadis in Monte Carlo.

She went to Italy, where she married stage designer Giovanni Grandi, with whom she had a daughter, Patricia. After further studies in Milan, with Giannina Russ, and an absence from the stage of almost ten years, she made a new debut as a soprano using her married name Grandi in 1932, at the Teatro Carcano in Milan in the title role of Verdi's Aida. She made her debut at La Scala in 1934, as Helen in Boito's Mefistofele. She made her British debut in 1939 at Glyndebourne, as Verdi's Lady Macbeth, considered her greatest role. She sang the role of Maria in the Italian premiere of Richard Strauss's Friedenstag in 1940. Later, she was sent to an internment camp at Avellino, near Naples; her husband retrieved her and she retreated to the Italian Alps for the duration. She reportedly actively supported the partisans, helping to smuggle Allied airmen to safety in Switzerland.

Returning to Britain following the Second World War, she sang at the Royal Opera House from 1947 to 1950, as Donna Anna in Mozart's Don Giovanni, Leonora in Il trovatore and the title role in Puccini's Tosca, and there she created the role of Diana in Arthur Bliss's The Olympians. She sang Lady Macbeth at the 1947 Edinburgh Festival, since issued on CD. In 1948, she recorded the Sleepwalking Scene from Macbeth conducted by Sir Thomas Beecham, but the scene's final floated high D-flat was "ghost-sung" by the English coloratura soprano Dorothy Bond. When news of this emerged shortly afterwards, Grandi announced that this note was not yet beyond her, and she would be singing it herself in a forthcoming concert at the Royal Albert Hall, which she did.

Margherita Grandi's singing voice is heard in the 1948 film The Red Shoes. She retired from the stage in 1951, and died in Milan in 1972, survived by her daughter.

She can be heard on disc and in the film as Giulietta in Offenbach's The Tales of Hoffmann conducted by Beecham, and in excerpts from Verdi's Macbeth, La forza del destino and Don Carlos, and Puccini's Tosca. She left few commercial recordings as she was in her fifties by the time she entered the studio. She never performed in, or even returned to, her native Australia after leaving in 1911, and consequently is little known there.

== Notes and sources ==
Notes
