= Giannina Russ =

Italian opera singer (1873–1951)

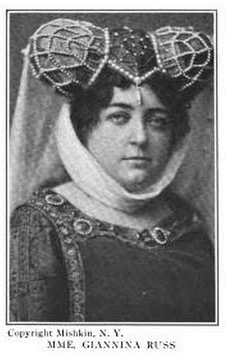
Giannina Russ, from a 1907 publication

Giannina Russ (27 March 1873 – 28 February 1951) was an Italian operatic dramatic soprano, particularly associated with the Italian repertory.

== Life and career ==
Russ was born in Lodi. She studied piano and voice at the Milan Music Conservatory with Leoni. She made her debut in Bologna, as Mimi in 1903, at La Scala in 1905, as Aida, and in Florence in 1908, as Norma.

She was quickly invited abroad, making her debut in 1904 at both the Royal Opera House in London, and the Monte Carlo Opera, also appearing at the Teatro Colón in Buenos Aires, and the Manhattan Opera Company in New York, in 1907.

Russ performed in a wide range of roles, from bel canto to verismo, her repertory included Semiramide, Giulia, Amaltea, Paolina, Abigail, Elvira, Leonora, Amelia, Wally, Gioconda, and Santuzza. She made recordings in 1905, singing "I Sacri Nomi" and "Ritorna Vincitor" from Aïda.

After retirement she became a respected voice teacher. Among her students were Margherita Grandi and Clara Petrella. She died on 28 February 1951 in Milan, where she lived her last years in the city's rest home for aged musicians.
