= World of Kids =

1951 film

- Directed by: Robert Youngson
- Produced by: Robert Youngson
- Distributed by: Warner Bros.
- Release date: June 23, 1951
- Running time: 10 minutes
- Country: United States
- Language: English

World of Kids is a 1951 American short documentary film directed by Robert Youngson. In 1952, it won an Oscar for Best Short Subject (One-Reel) at the 24th Academy Awards.
