= Clara Petrella =

Italian operatic soprano (1914–1987)

- Clara Petrella (photo with dedication)
- Occupation: opera soprano singer

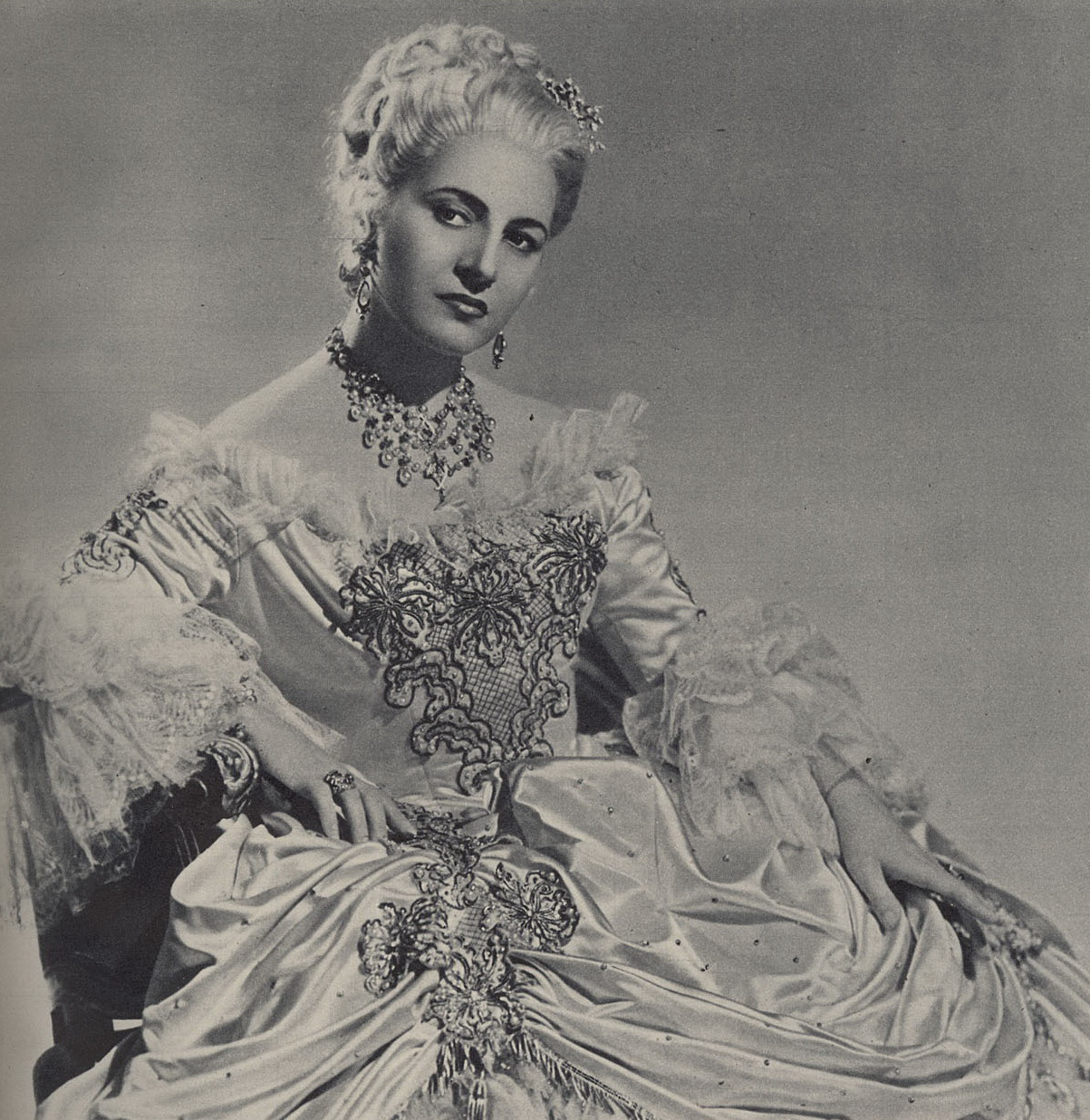
Clara Petrella, 1954.

Clara Petrella (28 March 1914 – 19 November 1987) was an Italian operatic soprano, particularly associated with the Italian repertory, an outstanding singing-actress nicknamed the "Duse of Singers".

Born in Greco Milanese to a musical family, she was a descendant of composer Errico Petrella, and the niece of soprano Oliva Petrella. She studied first with her sister Micaela, and later with Giannina Russ. She made her debut in Alessandria, as Liu, in 1939.

She quickly sang throughout Italy, making her debut at La Scala in 1947, as Giorgetta in Il tabarro, she sang there regularly until 1962. She was particularly admired in the verismo repertory and contemporary works. She created many roles in opera by the following composers; Lodovico Rocca, Ildebrando Pizzetti, Ermanno Wolf-Ferrari, and Renzo Rossellini.

Petrella had a beautiful spinto voice, combined with an explosive dramatic temperament, and she was compared to the great Italian actress Eleonora Duse. In the early 1950s, she made several recordings with Cetra Records, notably; Manon Lescaut, Madama Butterfly, Il tabarro, L'amore dei tre re, Zazà, and for Decca, she recorded Pagliacci. She also appeared on Italian television productions of Manon Lescaut and Il tabarro, in 1956.

Clara died in 1987 in Milan.

== Sources ==
- Le guide de l'opéra, les indispensables de la musique, R. Mancini & J-J. Rouvereux, (Fayard, 1986), ISBN 2-213-01563-5
