= Gunga Din (film) =

1939 film by George Stevens

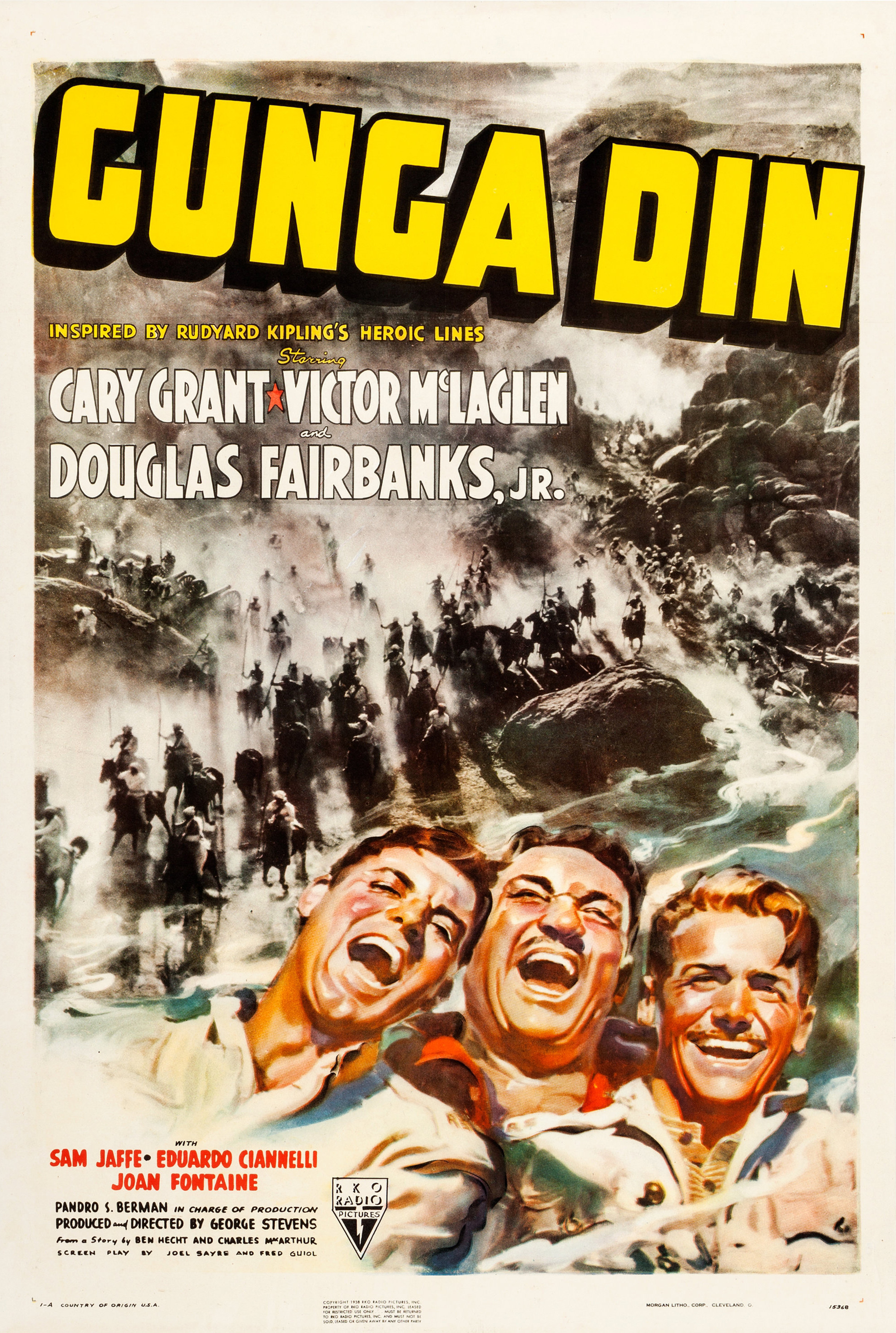
- Theatrical release poster
- Directed by: George Stevens
- Written by: Joel Sayre; Fred Guiol
- Story by: Ben Hecht; Charles MacArthur
- Based on: "Gunga Din"; 1890 poem by Rudyard Kipling
- Produced by: George Stevens
- Starring: Cary Grant; Victor McLaglen; Douglas Fairbanks Jr. Sam Jaffe; Eduardo Ciannelli; Joan Fontaine
- Cinematography: Joseph H. August
- Edited by: Henry Berman
- Music by: Alfred Newman
- Production company: RKO Radio Pictures
- Distributed by: RKO Radio Pictures
- Release date: February 17, 1939 (U.S.)
- Running time: 117 minutes
- Country: United States
- Languages: English; Hindi
- Budget: $1,915,000
- Box office: $2,807,000

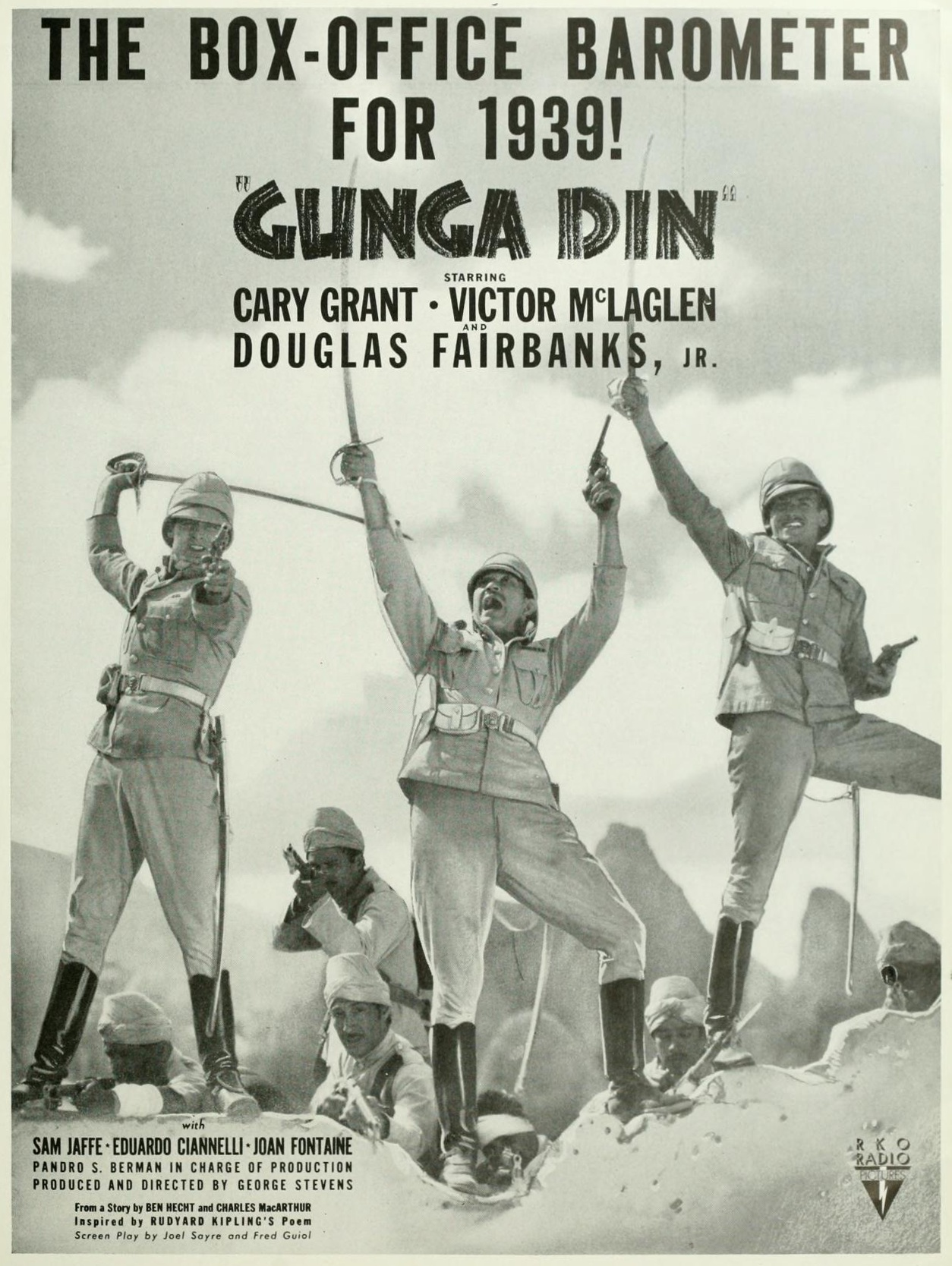
1939 magazine ad

Gunga Din is a 1939 American adventure film from RKO Radio Pictures directed by George Stevens and starring Cary Grant, Victor McLaglen, and Douglas Fairbanks Jr., loosely based on the 1890 poem of the same name by Rudyard Kipling combined with elements of his 1888 short story collection Soldiers Three. The film is about three British sergeants and Gunga Din, their native bhisti (water bearer), who fight the Thugs, a resurgent Indian murder cult, in colonial British India.

The supporting cast features Joan Fontaine, Eduardo Ciannelli, and in the title role, Sam Jaffe. The epic film was written by Joel Sayre and Fred Guiol from a storyline by Ben Hecht and Charles MacArthur, with uncredited contributions by Lester Cohen, John Colton, William Faulkner, Vincent Lawrence, Dudley Nichols, and Anthony Veiller.

In 1999, Gunga Din was deemed "culturally, historically, or aesthetically significant" by the United States Library of Congress and selected for preservation in the National Film Registry.

== Plot ==
On the Northwest Frontier of India, circa 1880, contact is lost with a British outpost at Tantrapur while it is in the midst of sending a telegraph message. Colonel Weed dispatches a detachment of twenty-five British Indian Army troops to investigate, led by three sergeants of the Royal Engineers: MacChesney, Cutter, and Ballantine, veteran campaigners. Accompanying the detail are six Indian camp workers, including regimental water carrier (Note: Also called a bhisti.) Gunga Din, who longs to throw off his lowly status and become a soldier of the Queen.

They find Tantrapur apparently deserted and set about repairing the telegraph. However, they are soon surrounded by hostile locals. The troops fight their way out, taking losses. Weed and Major Mitchell identify an enemy weapon brought back by the survivors as belonging to the Thuggee murder cult that had been suppressed by Sleeman fifty years before. Weed intends to send MacChesney and Cutter back with a larger force, to retake Tantrapur and complete the telegraph repairs. Ballantine, however, is due to muster out of the army in days; Weed orders Sgt. Higginbotham to join the expedition as Ballantine's replacement.

Once he is discharged, Ballantine plans to wed a woman named Emmy Stebbins and go into the tea business. MacChesney and Cutter are invited to the engagement party; they spike the punch, which Higginbotham eventually drinks. Higginbotham is so sick the following morning that he cannot march out with the expedition, so a reluctant Ballantine is ordered to replace him.

Ballantine's enlistment ends while the detachment goes to Tantrapur, and a relief column led by Higginbotham, with Emmy riding along to surprise Ballantine, arrives. Meanwhile, in Tantrapur, Gunga Din mentions a temple made of gold that he has found. However, MacChesney is not interested and has Cutter put in the stockade to prevent him from deserting to look for gold. That night, Cutter escapes with Din's help and goes to the temple, which turns out to belong to the Thugs. Cutter creates a distraction and allows himself to be captured so that Din can slip away and sound the warning.

When Din gives MacChesney the news, he decides to go to the rescue, while Higginbotham sends word to headquarters to call out the entire regiment. Ballantine wants to go, too, but MacChesney points out that he cannot, as he is now a civilian. Ballantine reluctantly agrees to re-enlist, on the understanding that the enlistment paper will be torn up after the rescue. Eager, MacChesney heads to the temple without questioning Din in detail. As a result, MacChesney, Ballantine and Din are easily captured. They are thrown into a cell with Cutter, who has been tortured since his capture; the Thuggee guru demands that they reveal the details of their regiment's location. The soldiers eventually take the guru hostage. A standoff ensues, and the soldiers take the guru to the roof of the temple and discover the true size of the Thuggee forces.

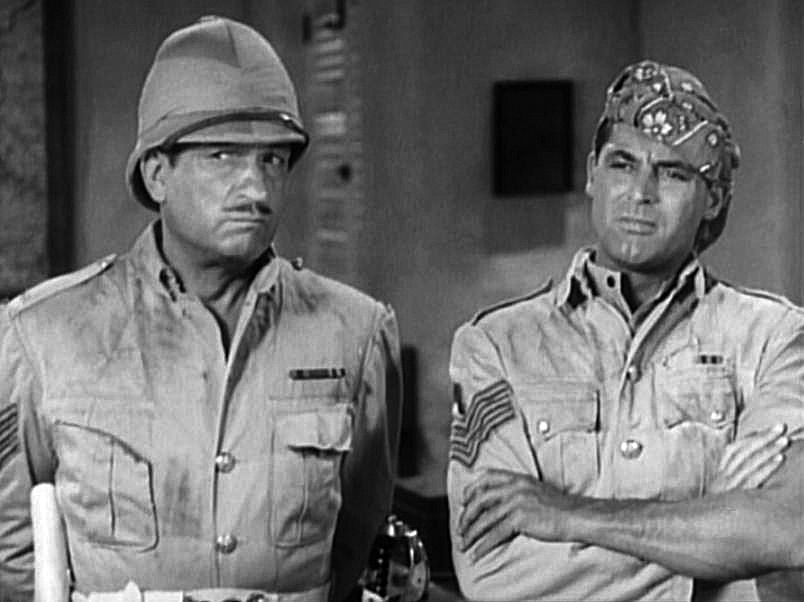
Still from Gunga Din trailer showing Victor McLaglen and Cary Grant

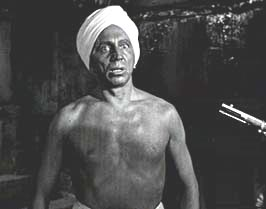
Sam Jaffe as Gunga Din

As the regiment marches toward the temple, the guru boasts that they are falling into the trap he has set. He orders his men to take their positions, but they refuse to abandon him. When he sees that they are unwilling to leave him in enemy hands, he commits suicide to remove that obstacle; the Thuggee force moves into position, while other cultists swarm up the temple to kill the sergeants. Thug shoot and bayonet Cutter. Gunga Din is also bayoneted, climbs with the last of his strength to the top of the temple's dome and sounds the alarm with a bugle taken from a dead Thug. He is then shot dead, but the British force is alerted and defeats the Thugs.

At Din's funeral pyre, Weed formally inducts Gunga Din as a British corporal—then he asks visiting journalist Rudyard Kipling to hand the draft of the poem the latter has just completed. (Note: The poem is "Gunga Din".) Weed reads the final words himself over Din's body. Ballantine announces his intention to remain in the army, and instead of tearing up his re-enlistment papers, gives them to Weed. Gunga Din's spirit later stands proudly and salutes at attention, now in British uniform.

== Cast ==
- Cary Grant as Sgt. Archibald Cutter
- Victor McLaglen as Sgt. "Mac" MacChesney
- Douglas Fairbanks Jr. as Sgt. Thomas "Tommy" Ballantine
- Sam Jaffe as Gunga Din
- Eduardo Ciannelli as Guru
- Joan Fontaine as Emaline "Emmy" Stebbins
- Montagu Love as Col. Weed
- Robert Coote as Sgt. Bertie Higginbotham
- Abner Biberman as Chota
- Lumsden Hare as Maj. Mitchell
- Cecil Kellaway as Mr. Stebbins (uncredited)
- Reginald Sheffield as Rudyard Kipling (uncredited)
- George Regas as Thug Chieftain "Toadface" (uncredited)
- Roland Varno as Lt. Markham (uncredited)

== Production ==
=== Development ===
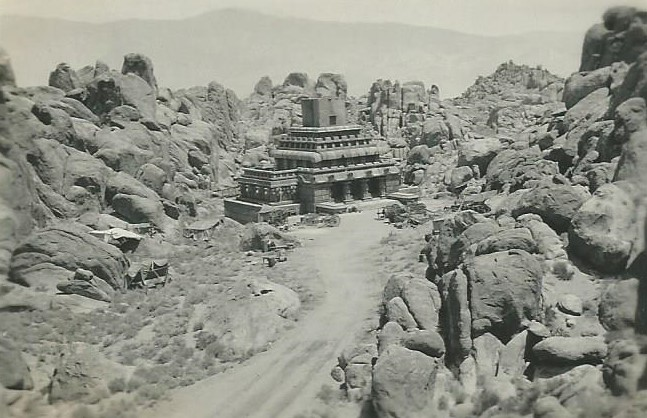
Gunga Din temple location in Alabama Hills (photo taken by Edward D. Sly in 1937 or '38)

The rights to Kipling's poem were bought by producer Edward Small's Reliance Pictures in 1936 for £4,700. RKO took the rights as part of a production deal with Small when he moved to the company. William Faulkner did some preliminary script work then the project was assigned to Howard Hawks. He got Ben Hecht and Charles MacArthur to write the screenplay and the film was set to start in 1937 but was delayed to find suitable cast. Hawks was fired from the project following the commercial failure of Bringing Up Baby and George Stevens was assigned to direct.

Originally, Grant and Fairbanks were assigned each other's role; Grant was to be the one leaving the army to marry Joan Fontaine's character, and Fairbanks the happy-go-lucky treasure hunter, since the character was identical to the legendary screen persona of Fairbanks' father.

According to Robert Osborne of Turner Classic Movies, when Grant wanted to switch parts, director George Stevens suggested they toss a coin; Grant won and Fairbanks Jr. lost his most important role.

On the other hand, according to a biography of director George Stevens by Marilyn Ann Moss entitled Giant: George Stevens, a Life on Film, the Cutter role was originally slated for comedy actor Jack Oakie until Grant requested the part because it would enable him to inject more humor into his performance, at which point Fairbanks Jr. was brought on board to replace Grant as Ballantine.

On a more recent showing of the film on TCM, Ben Mankiewicz has contradicted the story told about the coin-flip by his colleague Osbourne, and has stated that while Grant was originally slated to play Sergeant Ballantine, and did indeed decide to switch to the more comedic role of Sergeant Cutter, he claimed that after taking over the role that may or may not have already been filled, Grant actually recommended that his former role go to his friend Douglas Fairbanks Jr. and was primarily responsible for him gaining the part.

Fairbanks Jr. claims he was cast as Cutter by Howard Hawks then asked to change.

=== Filming ===
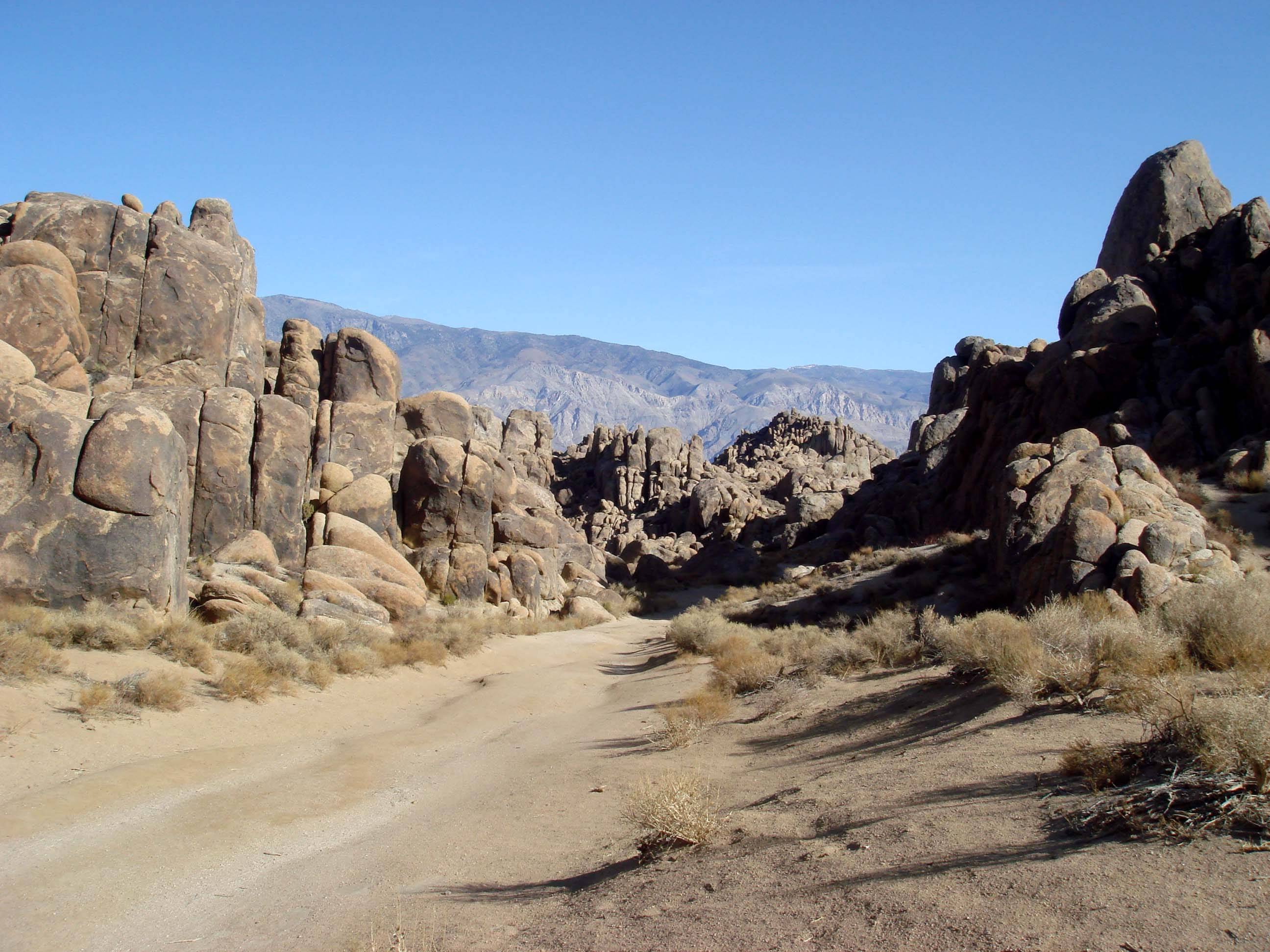
This narrow valley in California's Alabama Hills doubled as the Khyber Pass.

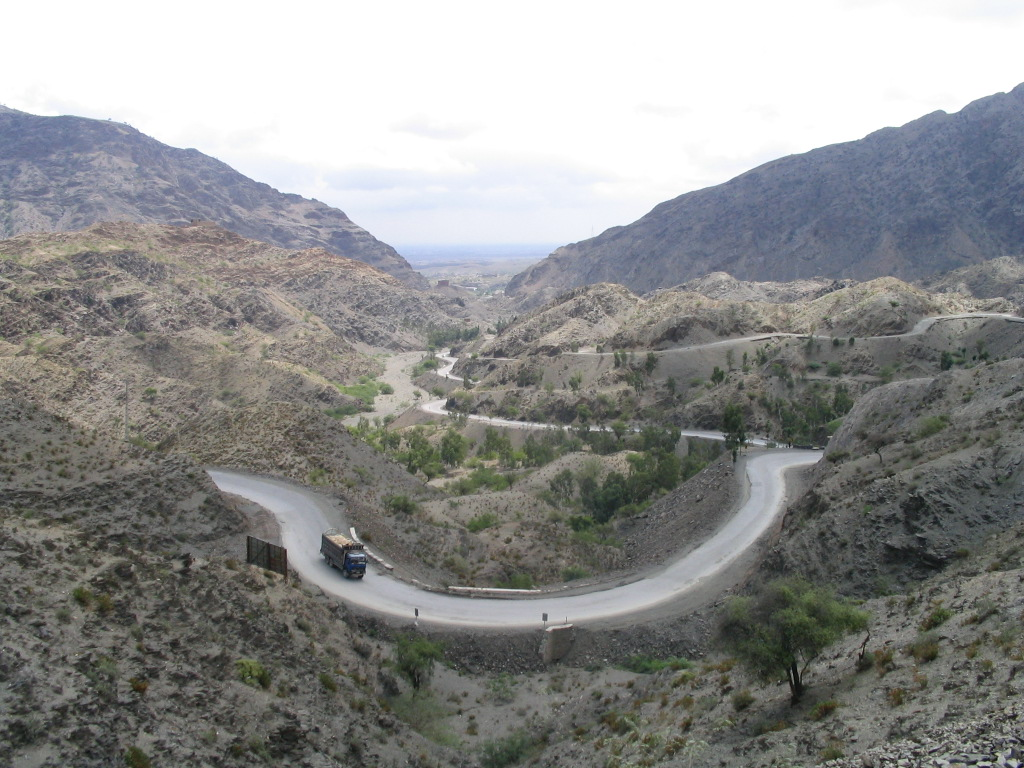
The real Khyber Pass

Filming began on June 24, 1938, and was completed on October 19, 1938. California's Sierra Nevada range, Alabama Hills and surrounding areas doubled as the Khyber Pass for the film. Variety reported that the last of the battle scenes "were shot with hundreds of half-clad extras shivering in the cold."

Douglas Fairbanks Jr. reported in a featurette interview on the DVD release that in his travels, he has met several Hindi Indians who were convinced the external scenes were filmed on location in Northwest India at the actual Khyber Pass. A few interiors were made on sets at RKO Radio Pictures Hollywood sound stages, and one exterior scene filmed on the RKO Encino movie ranch. The original script was composed largely of interiors and detailed life in the barracks. The decision was made to make the story a much larger adventure tale, but the re-write process dragged on into principal shooting. Some of the incidental scenes that flesh out the story were filmed while hundreds of extras were in the background being marshaled for larger takes.

The movie includes a sequence at the end in which a fictionalized Rudyard Kipling, played by Reginald Sheffield, witnesses the events and is inspired to write his poem (the scene in which the poem is first read out carefully quotes only those parts of the poem that tally with the events of the movie). Following objections from Kipling's family, the character was excised from some prints of the movie, but has since been restored.

The film premiered in Los Angeles on January 24, 1939.

== Reception ==
=== Box office ===
The film earned $1,507,000 in the United States and Canada and $1,300,000 elsewhere, but because of its high production cost, it recorded a loss of $193,000. The film was the sixth highest-grossing film nationally in 1939; however, in the ten states of Indiana, Ohio, Nebraska, Montana, Idaho, Utah, Pennsylvania, Alabama, Mississippi, and South Carolina, it was the third highest-grossing film, coming only behind Gone with the Wind (which came in first place nationally, as well as in each of these states individually) and The Wizard of Oz (which came in fifth place nationally and second place in the aforementioned ten states).

=== Critical ===
Time gave Gunga Din a positive review. However, they also noted that the film was part of a recent Hollywood trend of manufactured screwball comedies, re-releases, remakes, and thinly disguised remakes; comparing Gunga Din to several previous films such as Lives of a Bengal Lancer, Charge of the Light Brigade, and The Drum.

Bertolt Brecht discusses the film in his short essay "Is it worth speaking about the amateur theater?" Here Brecht reflects that "I felt like applauding, and laughed in all the right places, despite the fact that I knew all the time that there was something wrong, that the Indians are not primitive and uncultured people but have a magnificent age-old culture, and that this Gunga Din could also be seen in a different light, e.g. as a traitor to his people, I was amused and touched because this utterly distorted account was an artistic success and considerable resources in talent and ingenuity had been applied in making it. Obviously artistic appreciation of this sort is not without effects. It weakens the good instincts and strengthens the bad, it contradicts true experience and spreads misconceptions, in short it perverts our picture of the world."

Douglas Fairbanks Jr. called the film "my sole masterpiece among the hundred or so films I made."

After criticism from the Indian press (notably the Bombay Chronicle and Filmindia), the film was banned in Bengal and Bombay, then later in Japan because it "injures the sentiments of a friendly nation."

On the review aggregator website Rotten Tomatoes, 89% of 28 critics' reviews are positive. The website's consensus reads: "Funny, suspenseful, and spectacularly entertaining, Gunga Din is an expertly calibrated adventure flick with some unfortunately outdated ideas about race."

=== Awards ===
Gunga Din was on a preliminary list of submissions from the studios for an Academy Award for Cinematography (Black-and-White) but was not nominated.

In 1999, the film was deemed "culturally significant" by the United States Library of Congress and selected for preservation in the National Film Registry.

American Film Institute List

- AFI's 100 Years...100 Cheers – #74

== Influence ==
Gunga Din was one of novelist and screenwriter William Goldman's favorite films. His first novel, The Temple of Gold, is named after the location of the film's climax, and the movie is mentioned by name in the introduction to Goldman's novel The Princess Bride.

The film was remade in 1962 as Sergeants 3 by members of the Rat Pack (Frank Sinatra, Dean Martin, Sammy Davis Jr, Peter Lawford and Joey Bishop); the part of Gunga Din was played by Sammy Davis Jr. while Sinatra portrayed a variation of the Victor McLaglen role and Dean Martin played Cary Grant's part.

Several later films have paid homage to scenes from Gunga Din. In Help! (1965) the Beatles are pursued by a thuggee-like cult, and in The Party (1968) Peter Sellers plays an actor starring in "Son of Gunga Din" and parodies the bugle scene.

In the 1984 film Indiana Jones and the Temple of Doom (set in India in 1935), many of the events and scenes are taken directly from Gunga Din, including scenes involving the Thugee cult and its leader (cast with a look-alike) and the bridge sequence.

Rian Johnson, the director of the 2017 film Star Wars: The Last Jedi, listed Gunga Din as one of the six movies for the cast and crew to watch before starting production.

== See also ==
- List of American films of 1939
- Sergeants 3
