= Dorothy Bond =

English coloratura soprano (c.1921–1952)

Dorothy Irene Bond (later Dorothy Irene Dobson and Dorothy Irene Jenkins; c. 1921 – 20 November 1952), known professionally as Dorothy Bond, was an English coloratura soprano whose star shone brightly but briefly. She was noted for the purity of her tone and the accuracy of her intonation. She became a favourite singer of Sir Thomas Beecham's, recording the voice of Olympia for the Powell and Pressburger film of Offenbach's The Tales of Hoffmann in 1950. She also recorded Delius's A Village Romeo and Juliet under Beecham, and Ernest Bloch's Sacred Service under the composer. She was killed in a road accident aged 31.

== Training ==
Bond was born in 1921. She studied piano and cello at the Royal Academy of Music in London. She expressed an interest in becoming a singer, but Professor Evelyn Langston advised her to wait till she turned 20. This proved to be sound advice, as the fine coloratura voice she developed by the mid-1940s earned her a solid reputation in the concert hall.

== Career ==
In 1948, Bond participated in Thomas Beecham's recording of Frederick Delius's A Village Romeo and Juliet. She sang the roles of Vreli as a child, and the Gingerbread Woman.

In 1949, Bond participated in a recording of Ernest Bloch's Avodath Hakodesh (Sacred Service), conducted by the composer. The same year she sang final floated high D in a recording of the Sleepwalking Scene from Giuseppe Verdi's Macbeth, conducted by Beecham, which was otherwise sung by Margherita Grandi. This was followed in 1950 by a film soundtrack recording of Offenbach's Tales of Hoffmann, made under Beecham at Shepperton Film Studios by London Films. Bond sang the role of Olympia; the role was played on-screen by dancer Moira Shearer. The recording was then licensed by Decca and released on LP in 1951, Beecham having tried and failed in the courts to prevent its release.

In 1949 and again in 1952, Bond was the soprano soloist in performances of Ralph Vaughan Williams's A Pastoral Symphony at the BBC Proms. The latter performance was conducted by Sir Malcolm Sargent. In 1951, she recorded Johann Sebastian Bach's cantata Tritt auf die Glaubensbahn, BWV 152, conducted by Karl Haas.

With her second husband, the violinist Tom William Jenkins, Bond recorded a selection of songs and arias, including "O luce di quest'anima" from Gaetano Donizetti's Linda di Chamounix (reaching a top F with ease), Eric Coates's "Bird Songs at Eventide", the "Waltz Song" from Edward German's Tom Jones, and Olympia's Song from The Tales of Hoffmann.

== Death ==
On 20 November 1952, at the age of 31, Bond was killed in a road accident near Leicester.

== Personal life ==
Bond's first husband was Michael Dobson (1923–1992), principal oboist with the London Philharmonic Orchestra. They had a daughter, Ann.

In 1951, Bond married (as the second of his three wives) the violinist Tom William Jenkins (1910–1957), with whom she had a son.
