= Fourteen Hours =

1951 film

- Theatrical release poster
- Directed by: Henry Hathaway
- Screenplay by: John Paxton
- Based on: The Man on the Ledge; 1949 short story by Joel Sayre
- Produced by: Sol C. Siegel
- Starring: Paul Douglas; Richard Basehart; Barbara Bel Geddes; Debra Paget; Agnes Moorehead; Robert Keith
- Cinematography: Joseph MacDonald
- Edited by: Dorothy Spencer
- Music by: Alfred Newman
- Distributed by: Twentieth Century-Fox
- Release dates: March 6, 1951 (New York); April 27, 1951 (Los Angeles)
- Running time: 92 minutes
- Country: United States
- Language: English

Fourteen Hours is a 1951 American drama directed by Henry Hathaway that tells the story of a New York City police officer trying to stop a despondent man from jumping to his death from the 15th floor of a hotel.

The film stars Richard Basehart, Paul Douglas, Barbara Bel Geddes and Debra Paget. It also marks the screen debut of Grace Kelly and Jeffrey Hunter, who appear in small roles.

The screenplay was written by John Paxton based on an article by Joel Sayre in The New Yorker describing the 1938 suicide of John William Warde.

== Plot ==
A room-service waiter at a New York hotel is horrified to discover a man standing on the narrow ledge outside his room on the 15th floor. Traffic cop Charlie Dunnigan unsuccessfully tries to convince the man to return to his room. Dunnigan's officious chief dismisses him with contempt. The man on the ledge refuses to speak to psychiatrists; he wants Dunnigan, who is summoned from the street. A psychiatrist advises Dunnigan to relate to the man on a human basis. A curious crowd gathers in the street below and on the surrounding buildings. Cabbies take bets on when Cosick will jump, a young couple meets and a woman who is seeking a divorce changes her mind.

The police identify the man as Robert Cosick and locate his mother. Her hysterical behavior upsets Cosick and seems to drive him closer to jumping. His father, whom his mother has taught him to despise, arrives, but when he criticizes Robert's mother, Robert threatens to kill him. Mrs. Cosick reveals that Cosick has an estranged fiancée named Virginia who lives in Connecticut, and the police attempt to reach her.

Against the psychiatrist's advice, the police try to lasso Cosick, but he becomes furious. Dunnigan loses his temper and, in frustration, dares Cosick to jump. Robert apologizes and Dunnigan convinces him that everyone will leave the hotel room so that he can rest and eat. As Cosick begins to enter the room, a mentally ill street evangelist enters the room, frightening Cosick back to the ledge and destroying his trust in Dunnigan.

Night has fallen, and giant spotlights are in place on the street, trained on the hotel, but the police chief orders them to be pointed away. Virginia arrives and reveals that it was not she who broke the engagement. Cosick had told her that he would make her unhappy, and she tried to convince him to see a doctor. The psychiatrist explains the family dynamic in Freudian terms: Cosick's mother taught him to hate his father, which made him hate himself, and he feels unworthy of the love of others. However, there is hope that he can be helped.

Virginia pleads with Cosick to leave the ledge, professing that she loves and needs him. She recites a poem that he had written for her but stops at the morose final lines, which he completes. Police place a net below him, out of his sight in the dark. In the street, TV crews point the spotlights at the evangelist, calling "Kneel and pray!".

Dunnigan reconnects with Cosick and discusses the bright side of his life, and he offers to take Cosick fishing. A teenager on the street, mocking Cosick, jumps and accidentally lights a spotlight, temporarily blinding Cosick, who falls from the ledge but is caught by the net.

The psychiatrist tells Virginia and Dunnigan that Cosick, now sleeping in a hotel room behind them, wants to live.

== Cast ==
- Paul Douglas as Patrolman Charlie Dunnigan
- Richard Basehart as Robert Cosick
- Barbara Bel Geddes as Virginia Foster
- Debra Paget as Ruth
- Agnes Moorehead as Christine Hill Cosick
- Robert Keith as Paul E. Cosick
- Howard Da Silva as Deputy Chief Moksar
- Jeffrey Hunter as Danny Klempner
- Martin Gabel as Dr. Strauss
- Grace Kelly as Mrs. Louise Ann Fuller
- Frank Faylen as Walter, room service waiter
- Jeff Corey as Police Sgt. Farley
- James Millican as Police Sgt. Boyle
- Donald Randolph as Dr. Benson

== Production ==
=== Story ===
Although the onscreen credits contain a statement saying that the film and characters depicted were "entirely fictional," the film was based on the suicide of John William Warde, a 26-year-old man who jumped from the 17th floor of the Gotham Hotel in Manhattan on July 26, 1938 after 14 hours on a ledge. The character of Charlie Dunnigan was based on Charles V. Glasco, a policeman who tried to convince Warde to return to the safety of the hotel. Pretending to be a bellhop, Glasco entered Warde's room and spoke with him intermittently for 14 hours. Warde, who had previously attempted suicide, also heard pleas from his sister. Glasco had convinced Warde to return to the hotel, but a photographer scared him as he was reentering. As a result, Warde jumped from the ledge, and although police had tried to rig a net below him, it could not be extended far enough to block his fall. During the ordeal, traffic was stopped for blocks around the hotel and thousands watched the drama unfold.

Writer Joel Sayre wrote about the Warde suicide in an April 16, 1949 article in The New Yorker titled "That Was New York: The Man on the Ledge". The story was purchased by Twentieth Century-Fox in April 1949 and the studio assigned Sol C. Siegel to produce the film. In August 1949, the studio announced that the team of James Gow and Arnaud d'Usseau would write the script. In January 1950, Fox assigned screenwriter John Paxton to write the script. Paxton elected against employing flashbacks to explain Cosick's mental state.

In the film's original ending, Cosick falls to his death (as did John Warde in the real-life incident). However, on July 17, 1950, Fox president Spyros Skouras's 23-year-old daughter Chickie fell to her death from the roof of the Fox West Coast Building. Although authorities were unsure whether the fall was accidental, the woman had recently been treated for mental illness. After Skouras watched a preview version of the film, he refused to release it with its tragic ending, so director Henry Hathaway shot a new ending in which Cosick is saved, which delayed the film's release.

=== Casting ===
The story was originally purchased as a vehicle for Richard Widmark, with Robert Wagner to play the role of Danny, the young man in the couple. The role of Cosick was awarded to Richard Basehart, who had achieved stage fame in The Hasty Heart and had just signed a long-term contract with Fox. Paul Douglas was announced for the role of Dunnigan as early as August 1949. Grace Kelly, previously known for appearing in The Father on stage, made her film debut in the role of Virginia, for which Anne Bancroft also auditioned. Gary Cooper noticed Kelly during a visit to the set. He subsequently starred with her in High Noon. Hathaway hired more than 300 actors to play bit parts and serve as extras.

Howard Hawks refused to direct the film because of its subject matter and was only interested in directing if the script could be converted into a Cary Grant comedy, but Twentieth Century-Fox declined. Henry Hathaway was assigned to the project in April 1950.

=== Filming ===
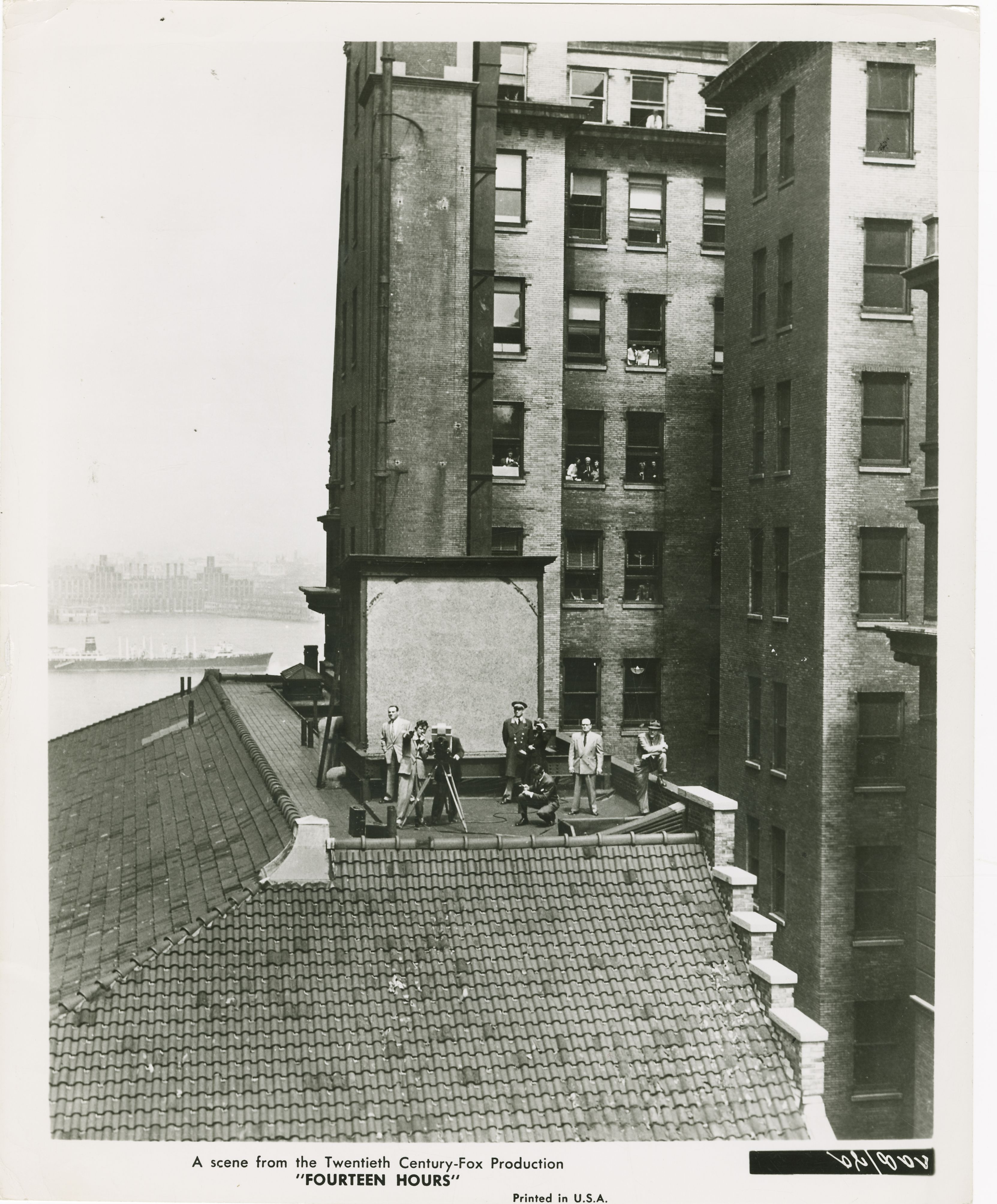
Actors and technicians at work

Twentieth Century-Fox changed the title in April 1950 from The Man on the Ledge to Fourteen Hours following a request from Warde's mother, who wished to distance the film from her son's story. Studio chief Darryl F. Zanuck considered changing the film's setting to another city for the same reason, but it was ultimately filmed in New York.

Filming began with a modest budget in New York in June 1950 and lasted 50 days. Much of the filming occurred on Broadway in Manhattan, including exteriors at the American Exchange National Bank building at 128 Broadway. Basehart's stunt double on the ledge of the building was Richard Lacovara. There was a padded platform below Lacovara, but it was removed for some shots. Basehart endured more than 300 hours on the ledge with little movement, despite having a sprained ankle and poison oak rashes on his legs. His wife died of cancer during production of the film.

== Release ==
As a sales gimmick when the film was shown in Baltimore, the studio stationed a trained nurse in the theater lobby to tend to any viewers who might be overcome by the film's suspense. Gimmicks were also employed in advertisements for the film, which contained a warning for film critics to avoid divulging the ending and stated that no customers would be seated during the film's final ten minutes.

In many American markets, Fourteen Hours was presented as the headliner in a double feature with My Outlaw Brother.

== Reception ==
In a contemporary review for The New York Times, critic Bosley Crowther called Fourteen Hours a "superior American film" with "hard, staggering shocks" and wrote: "Fox has taken the story of that poor, unbalanced young man, as it recently was recollected in The New Yorker Magazine by Joel Sayre, and has staged it, with liberal alterations and some added atmospheric details, to put on display a hotly throbbing, brutally candid slice of metropolitan life. Fitly directed by Henry Hathaway in crisp journalistic style and played to the hilt down to its "bit" parts, it makes a show of accelerating power."

Edwin Schallert of the Los Angeles Times wrote: "The cast is good, the subject unusual, and 'Fourteen Hours' is suspenseful in essence. However, it has the big disadvantage of centering around a single issue, which is bound to wear thin. .... Novelty and its documentary quality are the keynotes of the appeal of 'Fourteen Hours,' though its public perception is likely to be mixed."

The New Yorker praised Basehart's performance, writing that he "succeeds in conveying the notion that he is indeed sorely beset.”

Rotten Tomatoes rates the film at 63% based on eight reviews.

== Awards ==
The film was nominated for an Academy Award for Best Art Direction (Lyle R. Wheeler, Leland Fuller, Thomas Little and Fred J. Rode).

Fourteen Hours was listed among the top 10 films of 1951 by the National Board of Review of Motion Pictures. For his performance, Richard Basehart won the board's 1951 award for best actor.

The film was nominated for the BAFTA award for best film from any source. Hathaway was nominated for the Golden Lion Award at the Venice Film Festival, and Paxton was nominated for a Writers Guild of America award for his screenplay.

== Remake ==
In 1955, Fourteen Hours was remade as an episode of The 20th Century Fox Hour titled "Man on the Ledge", starring Cameron Mitchell and Joseph Cotten. The episode was released theatrically in Britain.

== Home video ==
When the film was shown at a revival at a Los Angeles theater in 2003, only one print survived. However, the title was included in the Fox Film Noir DVD series in 2006.
