= Hein Heckroth =

German art director (1901–1970)

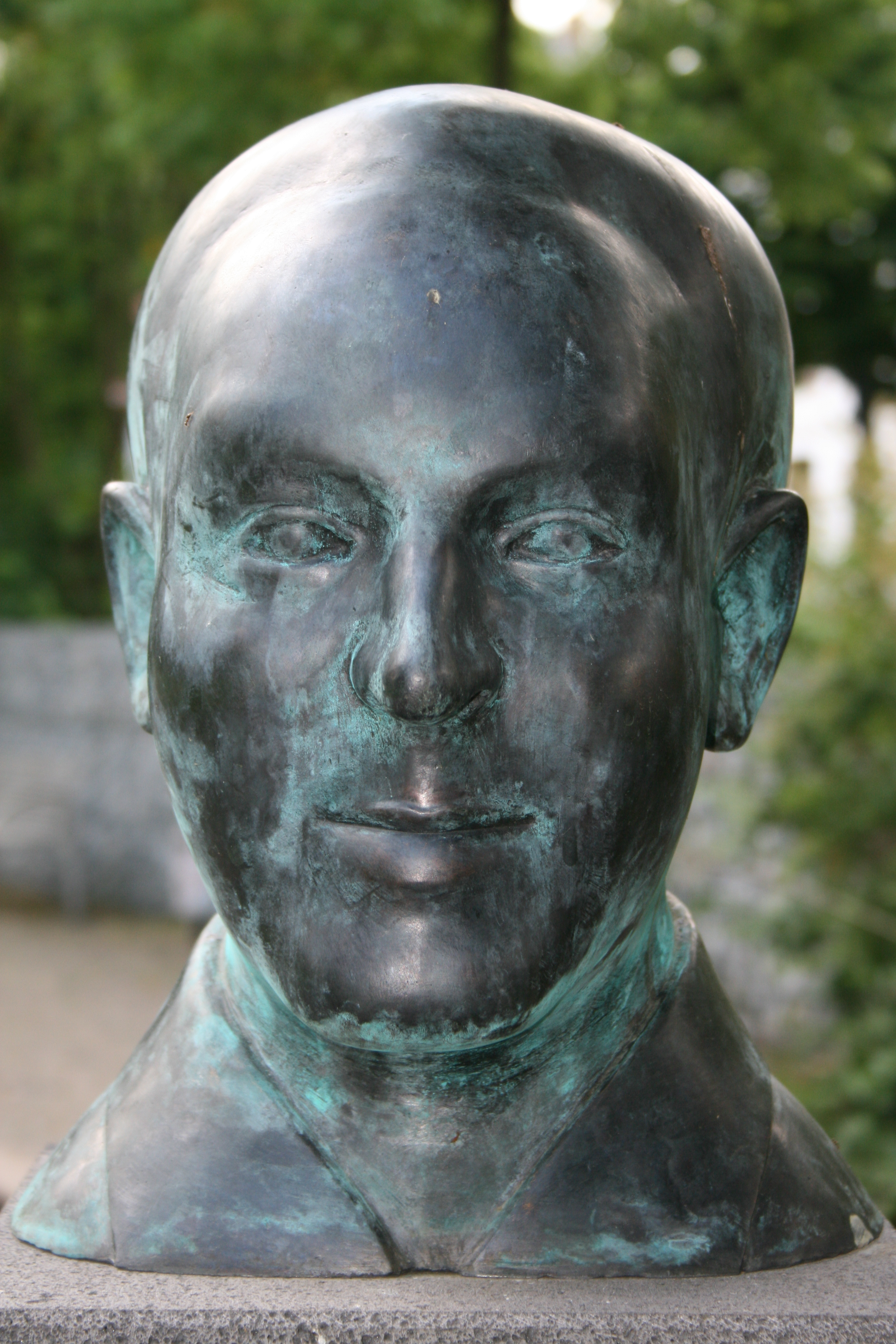
A bust of Hein Heckroth

Hein Heckroth (14 April 1901 in Gießen - 7 July 1970 in Amsterdam) was a German painter, costume designer and art director of stage and film productions. Heckroth spent much of his career in the United Kingdom, and he is best known for his work during that period with the filmmakers Michael Powell and Emeric Pressburger on films such as The Red Shoes and The Tales of Hoffmann.

== Early life and career ==
Heckroth was born in 1901 in Giessen, Germany. As a young man, he moved to Frankfurt, where he studied as a painter. He was deeply affected by the prevailing artistic movements of the postwar era, including Surrealism, Expressionism, and Cubism. Heckroth's career quickly skyrocketed, and, at only twenty-three years old, he began designing costumes and sets for Kurt Jooss's pioneering dance company. He achieved renown as a prolific designer of stage productions, including several performances of Jacques Offenbach's opera The Tales of Hoffmann and the original production of The Green Table. After Adolf Hitler came to power in Germany, Heckroth's Jewish wife Ada, also an artist, left for Paris with their daughter, Nandi. Heckroth joined them in 1935, and the three moved to Great Britain. There, he reestablished himself as both a painter and art designer, designing the sets and costumes for the first production of Don Giovanni at Glyndebourne in 1936 and the Kurt Weill operetta, A Kingdom for a Cow. During this time, he also began teaching art at Dartington Hall. There, he met his old friends, Walter Gropius and Lee Miller. Miller introduced him to her husband, Roland Penrose, and the art critic Herbert Read. He also befriended other members of the Dartington faculty, including David Mellor, Mark Tobey, and Cecil Collins.

== Move to England and work with The Archers ==
When World War II broke out, Heckroth was imprisoned by the British government as an enemy alien and shipped to Australia. His friends in the art world rallied to his defense; Read campaigned for his release, as did Michael Foot. As part of their efforts, the organized his first solo exhibition in Britain in May 1943. Their efforts were successful, and Heckroth was allowed to return to England. After his return, he designed an ambitious stage production of War and Peace which incorporated a number of filmic elements, including film projected onto the stage. The art director Vincent Korda noticed this, and he was soon recruited as the costume designer on Gabriel Pascal's Caesar and Cleopatra.

His entry into the film world was noticed by another German emigre, Alfred Junge, who was working as the production designer for Michael Powell and Emeric Pressburger, the acclaimed filmmaking duo known as The Archers. He served under Junge as the costume designer on A Matter of Life and Death and Black Narcissus.

Heckroth's greatest success came in 1948, when The Archers made him their production and costume designer on The Red Shoes. Junge was unwilling to design a film with the radical edge that Powell was looking for, and Heckroth's work quickly earned him notice. He won the Academy Award for Best Art Direction for his work on the film with art director, Arthur Lawson.

Heckroth remained one of The Archers' principal collaborators for the next several years, designing their films The Small Back Room, The Elusive Pimpernel, Gone to Earth, The Tales of Hoffmann (for which he was nominated for two more Academy Awards for his art direction and costume designs), and Oh... Rosalinda!!. He also served as artistic supervisor on The Battle of the River Plate.

== Return to Germany and last years ==
During the four year gap between The Tales of Hoffmann and Oh... Rosalinda!!, Heckroth returned to Germany, where he became the chief designer at the Frankfurt City Theatre. He also switched from a career in film to one in television. He invited Powell to Germany to direct the television versions of two stage productions he'd been hired to design, The Sorcerer's Apprentice, based on a recent ballet, and Herzog Blaubarts Burg, based on the Béla Bartók opera Duke Bluebeard's Castle. The last film he designed was Alfred Hitchcock's Topaz in 1967. He died in 1970.

His designs for The Red Shoes are preserved at MOMA in New York City and the British Film Institute in London.

== See also ==
- List of German-speaking Academy Award winners and nominees
