= Joel Sayre =

American reporter and screenwriter (1900–1979)

- Born: December 13, 1900; Marion, Indiana, U.S.
- Died: September 9, 1979 (aged 78); Taftsville, Vermont, U.S.
- Occupations: Reporter, screenwriter, novelist
- Notable work: Gunga Din (1939)
- Spouse: Gertrude Lynahan (m. 1930; died 1960)
- Children: 1; Nora

Joel Grover Sayre Jr. (December 13, 1900 – September 9, 1979) was an American reporter, screenwriter, and novelist. During Prohibition, he was a crime reporter for the New York Herald Tribune. He later served as a World War II correspondent for The New Yorker. In his time in Hollywood, he was best known as chief script writer for the successful 1939 film Gunga Din.

== Early life and education ==
Sayre was born in Marion, Indiana in 1900. He was the son of businessman Joel Grover Sayre and Nora Clemens Sayre, a photographer and interior decorator. He was raised in Columbus, Ohio and educated at the Columbus Academy. He later attended a private school in Cleveland.

At age 16 during World War I, Sayre attempted unsuccessfully to join the U.S. Army. However, with a falsified birth certificate, he managed to join the Canadian Army and was sent to Siberia with its Expeditionary Force. After the war, Sayre read literature at Exeter College, Oxford, graduating with a BA in English in August 1922. He became friends with author James Thurber in 1922, and they maintained a lifelong correspondence. He briefly studied medicine at Heidelberg University in Germany before returning to the U.S. and beginning his career in journalism.

== Career ==
After a short stint as a sports columnist for The Boston Herald, Sayre settled in as a crime reporter for the New York World and New York Herald Tribune. He wrote about "Legs" Diamond and other notorious gangsters of the 1920s Prohibition era. He also started contributing articles for The New Yorker magazine. In 1932 he published his first novel, Rackety Rax, a comic story about a racketeer who sets up a fake college, "Old Canarsie", and recruits a team of boxers and wrestlers to take the field as football players. The novel was quickly turned into a Hollywood film with Sayre receiving a story credit. In 1933 he published his second novel, Hizzoner the Mayor, a satirical look at corrupt "machine" politics. It was praised by The New York Times as "even more hilarious" than Rackety Rax.

In the mid-1930s, Sayre was lured to Hollywood to work as a screenwriter. His credits included Annie Oakley (1935), The Road to Glory (1936) co-written with William Faulkner, and The Toast of New York (1937). His most popular screenplay was the comedy-adventure film Gunga Din (1939), co-written with Fred Guiol. Loosely based on Rudyard Kipling's 1890 poem, Gunga Din became one of the top box-office successes of 1939.

During World War II, The New Yorker hired Sayre as a foreign correspondent. He reported on the Persian Gulf Command, which supplied the Soviet Union with munitions via Iran. He also covered the Teheran Conference in late 1943. His wartime articles for The New Yorker were collected in his 1945 book, Persian Gulf Command: Some Marvels on the Road to Kazvin. Shortly after V-E day, he was sent as a correspondent to Germany, where he met the Hofmann family who were living in a bombed-out home in Berlin. He published an account of their lives in his 1948 book, The House Without a Roof.

After the war, one of Sayre's notable magazine articles was "The Man on the Ledge", which appeared in The New Yorker in April 1949. The article chronicled the attempts to prevent a suicide jumper, and it became the basis for the film Fourteen Hours (1951).

== Personal life ==
In 1930, Sayre married Gertrude Lynahan, a reporter he met when she was working for the New York World. She was subsequently a fashion editor for The New York Times. They remained married until her death in 1960. Their daughter was the film critic Nora Sayre.

Joel Sayre died of heart failure on September 9, 1979. He was 78.
