= Fred J. Rode =

Set decorator

- Born: May 19, 1896; Brooklyn, New York, USA
- Died: October 1971; Washington, District of Columbia, USA
- Occupation: Set decorator
- Years active: 1939-1951

Fred J. Rode (May 19, 1896 – October 1971) was an American set decorator. He was nominated for an Academy Award in the category Best Art Direction for the film Fourteen Hours.

== Selected filmography ==
- Fourteen Hours (1951)
