= Emma Vecla =

French operatic soprano

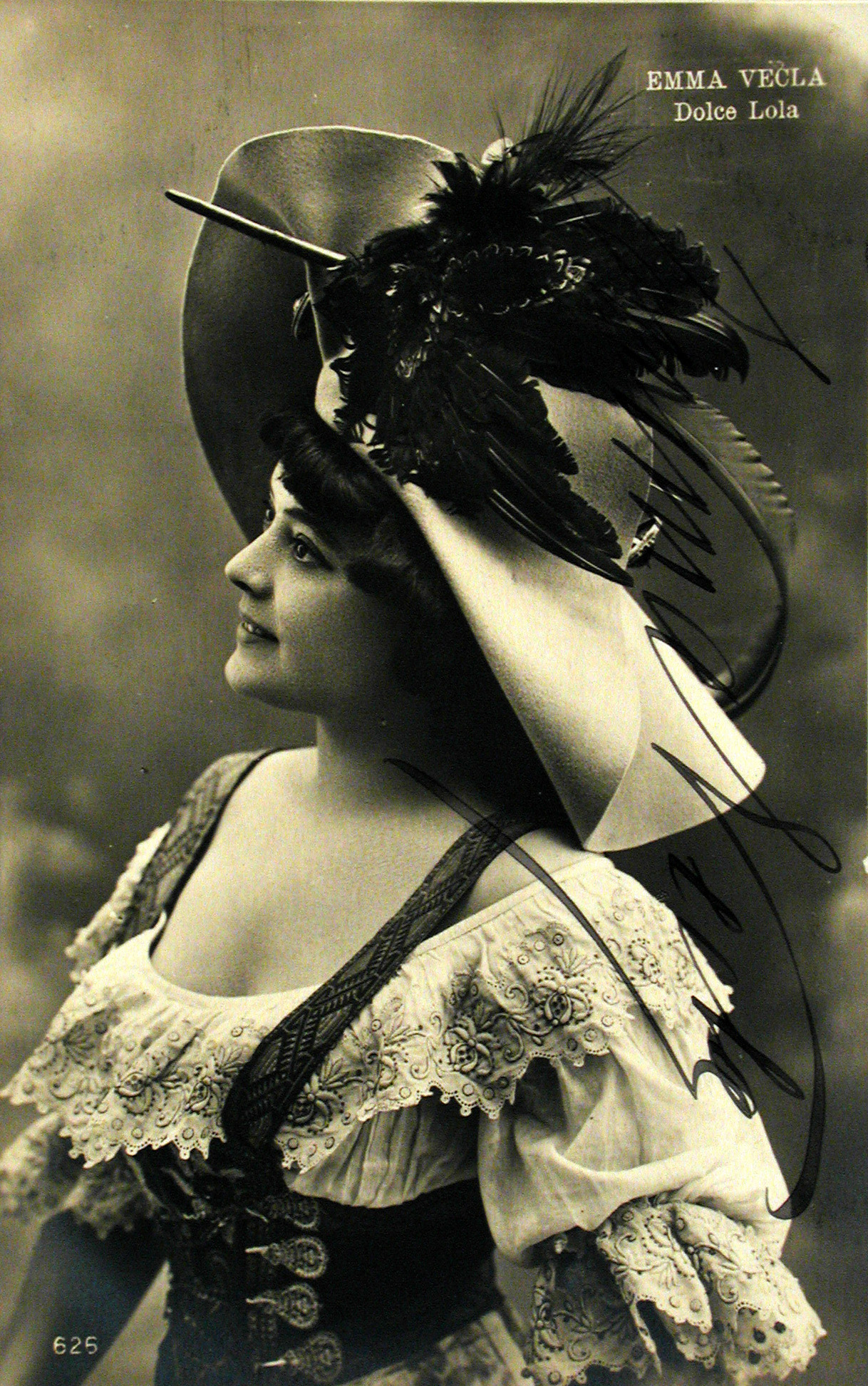
Emma Vecla

Emma Vecla (most widely used stage name), birth name Ernestine Louise Telmat, alternate stage name Adrienne Telma, (1877–1972) was a French operatic soprano who was born in Maghnia, Algeria. She made her début at the Opéra-Comique in 1898 as Filina in Ambroise Thomas' Mignon. She is remembered in particular for her operetta performances from 1907 in Italy, where she became quite a celebrity.

== Biography ==
Born on 11 January 1877 in Maghnia, Algeria into a French family, Ernestine Louise Telmat was educated at the Paris conservatory. She made her début at the Opéra-Comique in 1898 as Filina in Ambroise Thomas' Mignon. At the Opéra-Comique, she also played the title role in Cendrillon, Henriette in Enrique Granados' Follet, the Sandman in Hansel and Gretel and Ellen in Lakmé.

She probably first performed in Italy in 1903 at the Teatro Lirico in Milan, taking the title role in Thaïs. She also performed at opera houses in France, Spain and South America. In 1907, she turned from opera to operetta, becoming a celebrated performer in both French and German.

Her performances in grand opera included the title role in Jules Massenet's Manon, Mimi in La bohème, Marguerite in Gounod's Faust, the title role in Léo Delibes' Lakmé and Zerline in Daniel Auber's Fra Diavolo. From 1907 to 1930, she was one of the most prominent operetta singers, especially in Italy where she was greatly appreciated. There she played the role of Hanna Glawari in Franz Lehár's The Merry Widow no less than 985 times.

Emma Vecla died in Milan on 29 May 1972.

Vecla made a wide range of recordings on the Fonotipia label.
