= Robert Neild =

British economist (1924–2018)

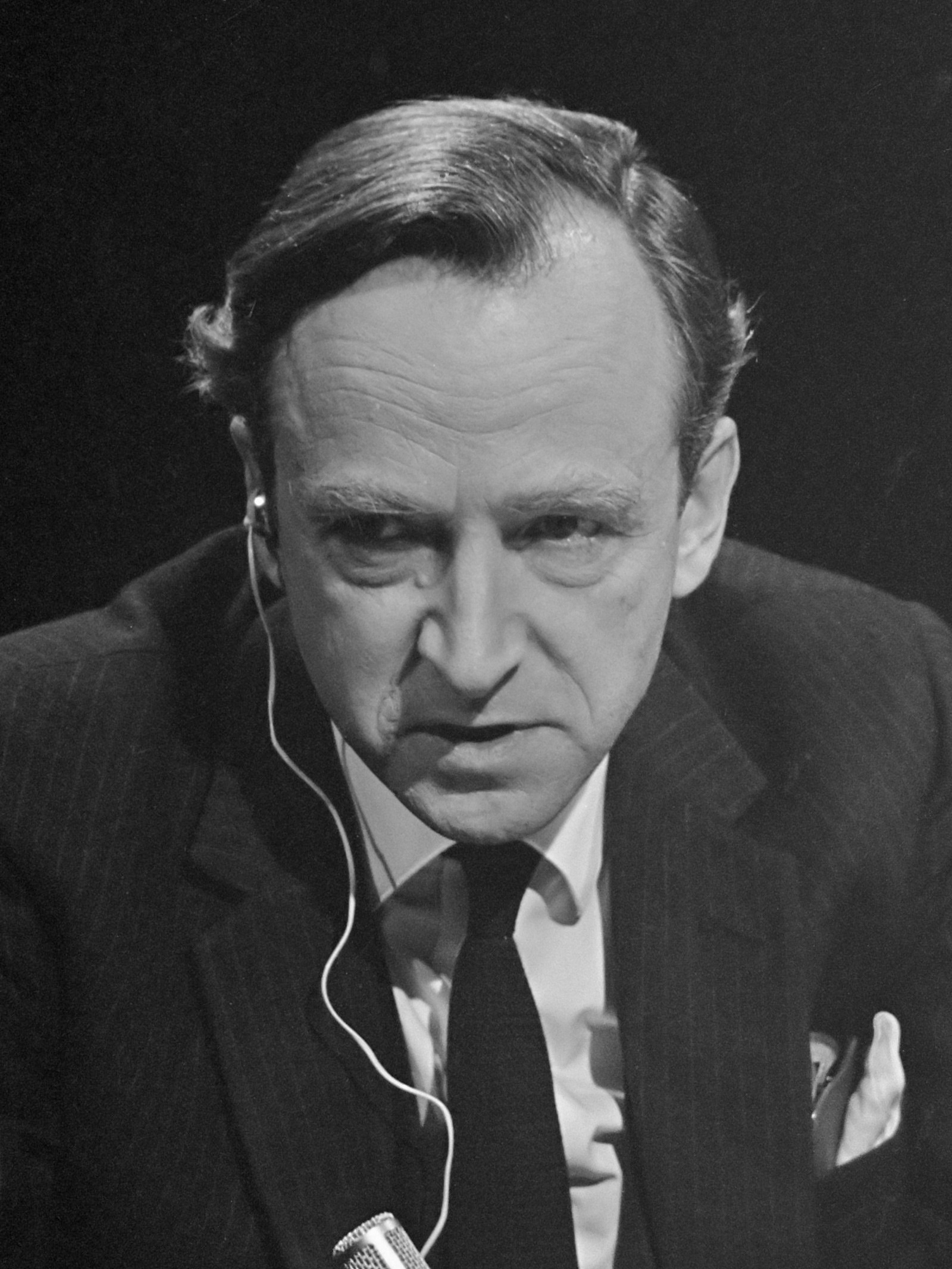
Robert Neild (1967)

Robert Ralph Neild (10 September 1924 – 18 December 2018) was a Professor of Economics at Cambridge University.

Robert Neild was born in Hertfordshire in 1924, and was educated at Charterhouse School and Trinity College, Cambridge. Elected a Fellow of Trinity in 1971, he has also served on the Secretariat of the UN Economic Commission for Europe and has held posts in the UK Cabinet Office, HM Treasury (its first Economic Advisor in the 1960s) and at the MIT Center for International Studies, India Project. A former Deputy Director of the National Institute for Economic and Social Research, he was in 1966 appointed as founding Director (with Alva Myrdal and then Gunnar Myrdal as chairman) of the Stockholm International Peace Research Institute (SIPRI) and has held other influential posts in commerce and on advisory bodies. In that same year, he was appointed by Harold Wilson as a member of the Fulton Committee on the Civil Service.

Widely published on issues concerned with economics and peace studies, Neild was also the author of The English, The French and the Oyster. Written on his retirement and spurred by a holiday in France, this is a historical-economic exploration of relative prices of oysters in Britain and France and the political and economic origins of these. He also wrote Public Corruption: The Dark Side of Social Evolution (Anthem Press).

He gained attention in 1981 as the co-instigator of a letter to The Times signed by 364 of Britain's best-known economists, questioning Margaret Thatcher's economic policy, with a warning that it would only result in deepening the prevailing depression.

Among memorable quotes, Neild, rebuffing Blair's claims about Saddam Hussein's alleged biological weapons, wrote: 'To say that the UN inspectors found "enough to have killed the world's population several times over" is equivalent to the statement that a man in his prime can produce a million sperm any day, therefore he can produce a million babies a day. The problem in both cases is that of delivery systems.'

He died on 18 December 2018 at the age of 94.
