= Giovanni Meoni =

Italian operatic baritone

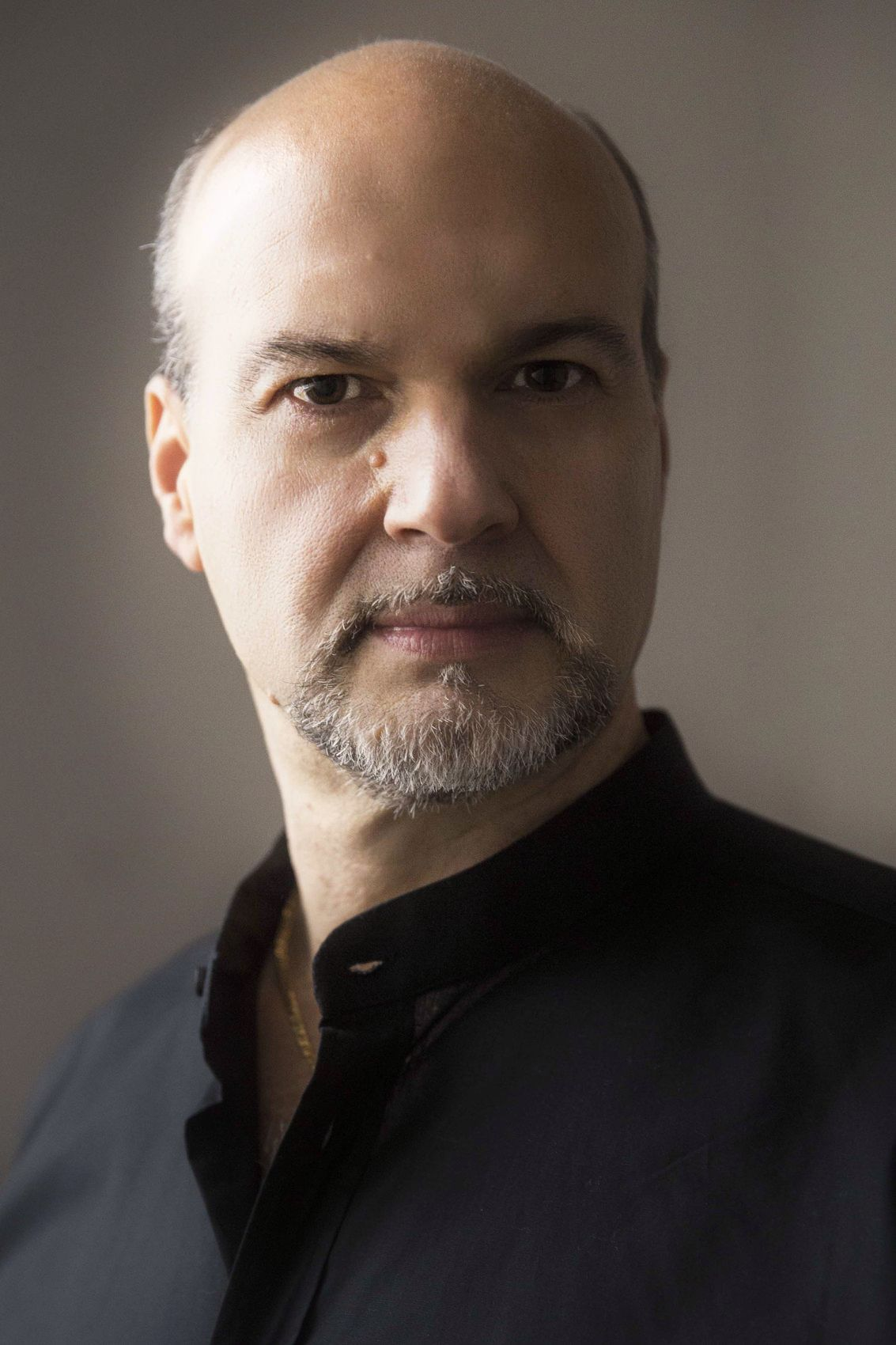
- Meoni in 2016
- Occupations: Opera singer; baritone

Giovanni Meoni is an Italian operatic baritone and Vocal coach.

== Biography ==
Meoni began his studies at the Conservatorio di Santa Cecilia in Rome. Following the teaching of Master Leodino Ferri (a pupil of Arturo Melocchi), that will be crucial and decisive for his artistic training, he made his debut in 1991 in La Bohème (Marcello) at the Teatro Flavio Vespasiano of Rieti. From 1991 to 1993 he was awarded important national and international awards in competition including the Mattia Battistini (1991), and first place and best baritone in the Mario Basiola (1993).

An important interpreter of the Italian operatic tradition, the early years of his career were in the bel canto repertoire of Bellini and Donizetti. Later on in his career he excelled in the "noble baritone" roles of Verdi, where the voice finds its natural place and reaches its maximum expression with refined phrasing and a significant presence.

== Career ==
He has sung on the major stages of the world including the Metropolitan Opera in New York City, Vienna State Opera, Liceu in Barcelona, Houston Grand Opera, Bolshoi Theatre in Moscow, Opera of Rome, Teatro San Carlo in Naples, Teatro Regio in Turin, Teatro Comunale di Bologna, Teatro La Fenice in Venice, Teatro Comunale in Florence, Teatro Massimo in Palermo, Teatro Carlo Felice in Genoa, Arena di Verona, Teatro Regio (Parma) in Parma, Sferisterio di Macerata, Bavarian State Opera in Munich, Hamburg State Opera, Deutsche Oper Berlin, Zürich Opera House.

Mr. Meoni has also performed in many of the world's most famous concert halls including Carnegie Hall in New York City, the Concertgebouw in Amsterdam, the Accademia Nazionale di Santa Cecilia, the Munich Philharmonic of Munich. He has also given recitals in Milan, New York City, London, Brussels, Paris, Madrid, Hong Kong, Bucharest, and Sofia.

During his career, he has collaborated with the world's leading conductors including Riccardo Muti, Zubin Mehta, Myung-Whun Chung, Daniele Gatti, Daniel Oren, Pinchas Steinberg, Gianandrea Noseda, Gianluigi Gelmetti, Bruno Campanella, Alain Lombard, Nello Santi, Patrick Summers, Paolo Arrivabeni, Renato Palumbo He has also collaborated with directors Franco Zeffirelli, Hugo De Ana, Pier Luigi Pizzi, Robert Carsen, Jonathan Miller, Giuliano Montaldo, Ferzan Özpetek, Beni Montresor, Alberto Fassini, Gianfranco De Bosio, Renzo Giacchieri, Henning Brockhaus.

He has also received important rewards such as the "Premio Lauri-Volpi" and the "Premio Ettore Bastianini"

Since 2023 he is Professor and Vocal coach in Parma's Conservatory of Music "A. Boito".

== Repertoire ==
- Giuseppe Verdi
  - Macbeth (Macbeth)
  - Nabucco (Nabucco)
  - Rigoletto (Rigoletto)
  - Simon Boccanegra (Simone)
  - Il trovatore (Conte di Luna)
  - Attila (Ezio)
  - La forza del destino (Don Carlo)
  - Don Carlos (Rodrigo)
  - Otello (Iago)
  - Un ballo in maschera (Renato)
  - I due Foscari (Francesco)
  - Ernani (Carlo V)
  - I vespri siciliani (Monforte)
  - I masnadieri (Francesco)
  - Luisa Miller (Miller)
  - La traviata (Giorgio Germont)
  - Aida (Amonasro)
- Gaetano Donizetti
  - La Favorite (Alphonse)
  - Lucia di Lammermoor (Enrico)
  - Poliuto (Severo)
  - Roberto Devereux (Nottingham)
  - Maria di Rohan (Chevreuse)
  - Messa di requiem
- Vincenzo Bellini
  - I puritani (Riccardo)
- Giacomo Puccini
  - Tosca (Scarpia)
  - il Tabarro (Michele)
  - Madama Butterfly (Sharpless)
- Charles Gounod
  - Faust (Valentino)
- Pietro Mascagni
  - Cavalleria rusticana (Alfio)
- Gioachino Rossini
  - Guglielmo Tell (Guglielmo Tell)
