= Five Songs =

Five Songs may refer to:

== Music ==
=== Classical compositions ===
- Five Songs, Op. 7 (Pfitzner) (1888–1900) by Hans Pfitzner
- Five Songs, Op. 9 (Pfitzner) (1894–1895) by Hans Pfitzner
- Five Songs, Op. 22 (Pfitzner) (1907) by Hans Pfitzner
- Five Songs, Op. 26 (Pfitzner) (1916) by Hans Pfitzner
- Five Songs, Op. 37 (Sibelius) (1900–02) by Jean Sibelius
- Five Songs, Op. 38 (Sibelius) (1903–04) by Jean Sibelius
- Five Songs, Op. 15 (Bartók) (1916) by Béla Bartók
- Five Songs (1956–57) by Witold Lutosławski
- Cinq mélodies, Op. 2 (1869) by Henri Duparc

=== Albums and EPs ===
- Five Songs and a Cover, a 2005 EP by Foo Fighters
- 5 Songs (Seether EP), 2002
- 5 Songs (The Decemberists EP), 2001
- 5 Songs (Iced Earth EP), 2011
- 5 Songs, a 2007 EP by The Story So Far

== See also ==
- Music to Five Poems by J. P. Jacobsen, Op. 4 (1891), songs composed by Carl Nielsen
- Five Songs from the Norwegian (1888), a compositions by Frederick Delius
- Five Christmas Songs (1897–1913) by Jean Sibelius
- Five Mystical Songs (1906–1911), by Ralph Vaughan Williams
- Five Flower Songs (1950), by Benjamin Britten
- 5 Songs Dedicated to Louis Hornbeck, compositions by Edvard Grieg
- Cinco canciones populares argentinas (1943), by Alberto Ginastera
- Cinco canciones negras (1945), by Xavier Montsalvatge
- Cinco canciones para niños y dos canciones profanas (1938–1939), by Silvestre Revueltas
- Cinco canciones a una paloma que es el alma (1955), by Ricardo Molinari
- Cinco Canciones Vascas for Soprano and Orchestra, by Tomás Garbizu
- 5 Little Songs (5 Petites chansons) (1915), a composition by Reynaldo Hahn
- Cinq Chansons à Hurle-Vent (2014), by Ben Foskett
- Cinq chansons folkloriques et deux rigaudons à une voix (c. 1931), compositions by Vincent d'Indy
- A number of compositions by Eugène Bozza beginning Cinq chansons ...
- Cinq chansons pour les enfants (1932, a composition by Jean Françaix
- Cinq Chansons de femme (1952), by Philip Cannon
- Cinq chansons de Paul Fort, Op. 18 (1935), by Jean Absil
- Five Spanish Songs, a 2013 EP by Destroyer
