= Two Songs, Op. 19 (Pfitzner) =

Two Songs
- by Hans Pfitzner
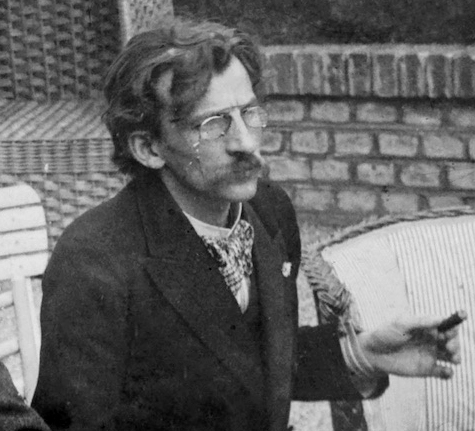
- Hans Pfitzner in 1905
- Native name: Zwei Lieder
- Opus: 19
- Text: Carl Hermann Busse
- Composed: 1905
- Published: 1906 - Leipzig
- Publisher: Max Brockhaus
- Movements: 2
- Scoring: Voice and piano

Two Songs, Op. 19 (German: Zwei Lieder), is a set of two songs by German composer Hans Pfitzner. It was finished in 1905.

== Background ==
Pfitzner's Op. 19 presents two contrasting songs dealing with love scenes. They were written to two poems by Carl Busse in 1905 and were dedicated to Ottilie Metzger-Froitzheim. The set was published in Leipzig in 1906 by Max Brockhaus.

== Structure ==
The set is written for middle voice and piano. It is composed of two contrasting songs, the first one in C♯ minor, and the second one in A♭ major:

1. Stimme der Sehnsucht. Äußerst schnell (Presto)
2. Michaelskirchplatz. Langsam

== Recordings ==
The composer performed at the piano Michaelskirchplatz for recording, with baritone Gerhard Hüsch at Electrola Studios on February 10, 1939, in Cologne. It is common for singers to record these two pieces individually instead of as a whole set. The following is a list of complete recordings of the set:

Recordings of Pfitzner's Two Songs, Op. 19
Voice	Piano	Date of recording	Place of recording	Label
Uwe Schenker-Primus	Klaus Simon	2021	—	Naxos
