= Three Songs, Op. 10 (Pfitzner) =

Three Songs
- by Hans Pfitzner
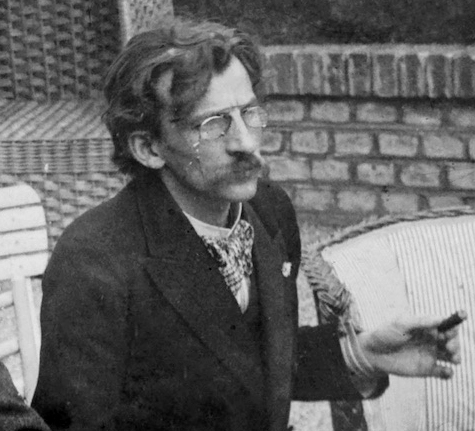
- Hans Pfitzner in 1905
- Native name: Drei Lieder
- Opus: 10
- Text: Detlev von Liliencron; Joseph von Eichendorff
- Language: German
- Published: 1900 – Leipzig
- Publisher: Max Brockhaus
- Movements: 3
- Scoring: Middle voice and piano

Three Songs, Op. 10 (German: Drei Lieder), is a song cycle for middle voice and piano by German composer Hans Pfitzner. It was composed in 1900.

== Background ==
Three Songs, Op. 10, includes songs based on poems by Detlev von Liliencron as well as an ending song setting a text by Joseph von Eichendorff. The Liliencron settings were unofficially commissioned by the poet's publisher, Schuster und Löffler, who suggested that Pfitzner set lesser-known texts; instead, Pfitzner presented three settings of the composer's own choice, among which were Liliencron's own Sehnsucht and Müde. These two songs were never published by Schuster und Löffler. Pfitzner also composed a third Liliencron setting, Tiefe Sehnsucht, but refused to authorize its publication; he later gave the manuscript to Liliencron in 1904 as a sixtieth birthday gift. The song's melody was subsequently reused in Die Rose vom Liebesgarten. The set was dedicated "in reverence" to Egon von Niederhöffer. The set was completed in 1900 and was published that same year by Max Brockhaus in Leipzig.

== Structure ==
The set is scored for middle voice and piano. The following is a list of movements:

1. Sehnsucht. Langsam
2. Müde. Leicht, munter
3. Zum Abschied meiner Tochter. Gemächlich – Schneller

== Recordings ==
Pfitzner recorded the third song in this cycle at the piano, with baritone Gerhard Hüsch at Electrola Studios on February 10, 1939, in Cologne. A list of complete recordings can be found below:

Recordings of Pfitzner's Three Songs, Op. 10
Voice	Piano	Date of recording	Place of recording	Label
Uwe Schenker-Primus	Klaus Simon	2021	—	Naxos
