= Four Songs, Op. 32 (Pfitzner) =

1923 song cycle by Hans Pfitzner

Four Songs
- for Baritone or Bass with Piano after poems by Conrad Ferdinand Meyer
- by Hans Pfitzner
- Native name: Vier Lieder für eine Singstimme mit Klavier
- Opus: 32
- Language: German
- Composed: 1923
- Published: 1923 - Berlin
- Publisher: Adolph Fürstner
- Movements: 4
- Scoring: Bass (or baritone) and piano

Four Songs for Baritone or Bass with Piano after Poems by Conrad Ferdinand Meyer, Op. 32 (German: Vier Lieder für Bariton oder Bass mit Klavier nach Gedichten von Konrad Ferdinand Meyer), commonly referred to as Four Songs for consistency, is a song cycle by German composer Hans Pfitzner. Written in 1923, the work is one of the last song cycles written by the composer.

== Background ==
Four Songs, Op. 32, was composed in 1923, and was conceived as a coherent cycle from the start, rather than a compilation of independent pieces, written in a few weeks. It sets four different poems by Conrad Ferdinand Meyer. The first song to be completed was the first one, on June 25; then, the fourth one was completed on July 1; the third one was finished the next day, July 2; and, lastly, the second song was the last to be finished, on July 5. The first two songs were dedicated to Paul Bender, a German bass, and the last two were dedicated to Heinrich Rehkemper, a baritone. Both had previously worked with Pfitzner in the composer's operas. The set premiered shortly after, on September 7, 1923, in Munich.

Four Songs, Op. 32, was published in 1923 in Berlin by Adolph Fürstner, the same publisher responsible for several of Pfitzner's late song collections.

== Structure ==
The cycle consists of four songs for bass or baritone and piano. Musicologist Peter Wackernagel described this set as a "song symphony" in four movements, as they correspond to the traditional four-movement symphonic structure. The first song, in F minor, is a solemn, slow and restrained, chorale-like introduction which concludes in F major. The song is based on the poem Es geht mit mir zu Ende. The second song remains in the same key, F major, and is a scherzo-like, swift movement. based on the homonymous poem by Meyer. The third song is a slow adagio-like movement in A-flat major, even though much of it lacks a stable tonal center. It is based on Meyer's Meine eingelegten Ruder triefen. The last song, which is after the homonymous poem by Meyer, works as an intense finale in F minor that closes the piece in the initial key.

Following is the list of movements in the set:

1. Hussens Kerker. Sehr langsam
2. Säerspruch. Gemessen, heiter-kräftig
3. Eingelegte Ruder. Sehr ruhig (Adagio)
4. Lass scharren deiner Rosse Huf.... Sehr leidenschaftlich. Schnell

== Reception ==
Pfitzner recorded Hussens Kerker and Säerspruch in a performance with baritone Gerhard Hüsch and the composer himself at the piano, at Electrola Studios in Cologne. In this session, which took place on February 4, 1938, the composer only recorded poems from Opp. 32 and 40. Following is a list of complete recordings of the piece:

Recordings of Pfitzner's Four Songs, Op. 32
Voice	Piano	Date of recording	Place of recording	Label
Uwe Schenker-Primus	Klaus Simon	2021	—	Naxos
