= Six Songs, Op. 40 (Pfitzner) =

Six Songs
- by Hans Pfitzner
- Native name: Sechs Lieder
- Opus: 40
- Year: 1932
- Published: 1932
- Publisher: Edition Peters
- Movements: 6
- Scoring: Mezzo-soprano and piano

Six Songs, Op. 40 (German: Sechs Lieder) is the last song cycle and one of the last compositions for voice and piano by German composer Hans Pfitzner. The composer wrote it in 1931, at the age of 62.

== Background ==
This song cycle was completed at the end of 1931. The first song, Leuchtende Tage, was written on October 8, after a homonymous poem by Ludwig Jacobowski. Pfitzner then wrote the fourth song in the set, Herbstgefühl, composed on November 19, after a homonymous poem by Friedrich Hermann Frey under the pseudonym Martin Greif, which was collected in his own Gedichte (1868). The next songs were written relatively more hastily to get them published as a set. The second song was next, Wenn sich Liebes von dir lösen will, composed on December 12 with text by contemporary poet Adolf Bartels. Then, it was Sehnsucht, written a few days later, on December 12, after a poem written by Ricarda Huch. The fifth song, Wanderers Nachtlied, was written on December 16, after the homonymous poem by Johann Wolfgang von Goethe, originally written in 1776. The last song to be featured in the set is Der Weckruf, the poem which it is based on was written by Joseph Karl Benedikt Freiherr von Eichendorff, originally published in his own Gedichte.

The set premiered on February 12, 1932, in Munich. It was published that year by Edition Peters in Leipzig, and was reprinted in London in 1960. Pfitzner also made two arrangements: one of Wanderers Nachtlied, in which he orchestrated the piano part, and another one of Der Weckruf, for choir and orchestra, even thought the composer specifies a solo singer can replace the choir. Pfitzner also recorded Leuchtende Tage and Herbstgefühl with the baritone Gerhard Hüsch, accompanying him at the piano, at the Electrola Studios in Cologne on February 4, 1938. During this session, he recorded only songs from Opp. 32 and 40.

== Structure ==
Six Songs is made up of six lieder for middle voice (mezzo-soprano) and piano. The following is a list of movements in the set:

1. Leuchtende Tage. Bewegt, mit Empfindung
2. Wenn sich Liebes von dir lösen wil. Ruhig, ergeben
3. Sehnsucht. Langsam, innig
4. Herbstgefühl. Bewegt
5. Wanderers Nachtlied. Sehr langsam
6. Der Weckruf. Ziemlich schnell

Each piece in the set has its own key. Song No. 1 is in B minor and in an unchanging 3/4. Song No. 2 is in A minor and presents some time signature changes. Song No. 3 is in D major and in a constant 2/4, even though the central section is used to constantly modulate keys in an unstable tonal center. Song No. 4 is in G major. While the piano uses 6/8 as a time signature, the singer simultaneously uses. Song No. 5 marks a return to D major and is in an ample and slow-moving 6/4. The last song presents a short motif on the piano for the first three bars with no tempo marking, and then presents the main movement in B major.
