= Five Songs, Op. 9 (Pfitzner) =

1895 song cycle by Hans Pfitzner

Five Songs
- by Hans Pfitzner
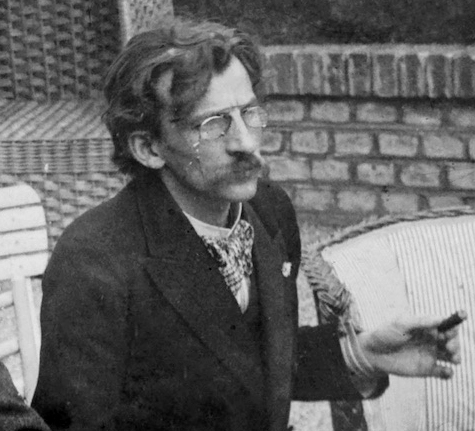
- Hans Pfitzner in 1905
- Opus: 9
- Composed: 1894-95
- Dedication: Anton Sistermans
- Published: 1898 - Leipzig
- Publisher: Max Brockhaus
- Movements: 5
- Scoring: Voice and piano

Five Songs, Op. 9, is a song cycle written by German composer Hans Pfitzner. Composed after poems by Joseph Freiherr von Eichendorff, it was written between 1894 and 1895

== Background ==
The Five Songs were written in 1894-95 and dedicated to Anton Sistermans. It marks Hans Pfitzner’s first settings of poems by Joseph von Eichendorff, a poet with whom he maintained a close association throughout his career, later culminating in the cantata Von deutscher Seele. The set was published in Leipzig in 1898, by Max Brockhaus. Pfitzner's fondness of the first two songs in this set was apparent insofar as he recorded them at the piano with baritone Gerhard Hüsch at Electrola Studios on February 10, 1939, in Cologne, and he arranged them for violin and piano in a set of arrangements published in 1940, also by Max Brockhaus in Leipzig.

== Structure ==
Five Songs was written for low voice and piano. The text presented in the original publication was in German, even though John Bernhoff provided English translations for both the text in the songs and the titles. The movement list is as follows:

1. Der Gärtner ("The Gardener"). Langsam
2. Die Einsame ("The Soul of Solitude"). Äusserst langsam und zart
3. Im Herbst ("Autumn"). Schwermütig, jedoch nicht langsam, etwas aufgeregt
4. Der Kühne ("The Bold Hunter"). Sehr rhythmisch zu spielen und zu singen, im Romanzenton
5. Abschied ("Farewell"). Sehr langsam, leise

== Recordings ==
Pfitzner's Op. 9 has frequently been recorded in excerpts, especially at recitals. Pfitzner himself recorded only songs Nos. 1 and 2. The following is a list of complete performances of Five Songs, Op. 9:

Recordings of Pfitzner's Five Songs, Op. 9
| Voice | Piano | Date of recording | Place of recording | Label |
|---|---|---|---|---|
| Uwe Schenker-Primus | Klaus Simon | 2021 | — | Naxos |
