= Four Songs, Op. 29 (Pfitzner) =

Song cycle by Hans Pfitzner

Four Songs
- after Poems by Hölderlin, Rückert, Goethe, and Dehmel, for voice and piano
- by Hans Pfitzner
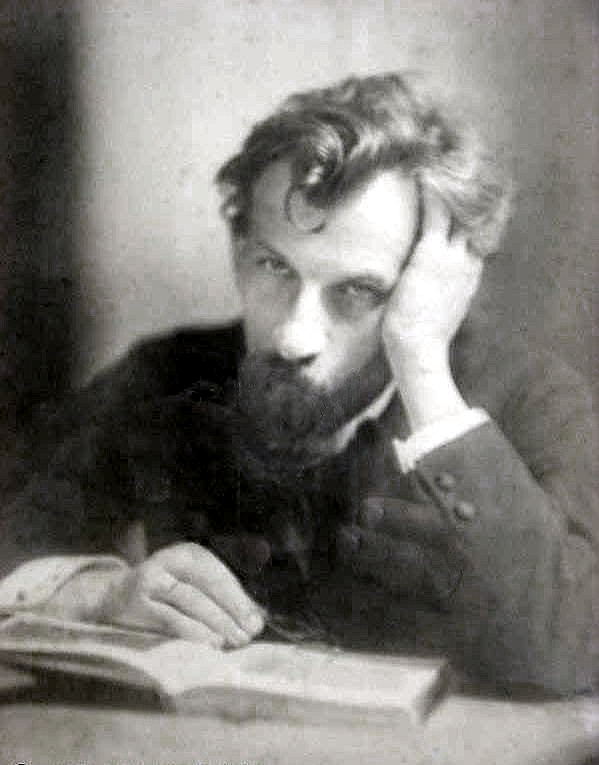
- Hans Pfitzner ca. 1910
- Native name: Vier Lieder nach Gedichten von Hölderlin, Rückert, Goethe, Dehmel, für eine Singstimme mit Klavier
- Opus: 29
- Language: German
- Composed: 1921
- Published: 1922 - Berlin
- Publisher: Adolph Fürstner
- Movements: 4
- Scoring: Voice and piano

Four Songs after Poems by Hölderlin, Rückert, Goethe, and Dehmel, for Voice and Piano, Op. 29 (German: Vier Lieder nach Gedichten von Hölderlin, Rückert, Goethe, Dehmel, für eine Singstimme mit Klavier), commonly referred to as Four Songs for consistency, is a song cycle written by German composer Hans Pfitzner. Dedicated to the composer's family, it was finished in 1921.

== Background ==
This cycle was created when Pfitzner was already in his fifties, in 1921. In it, Pfitzner set homonymous poems by Friedrich Hölderlin (Abbitte, composed on 11 November), Friedrich Rückert (Herbsthauch, composed on 8 October), Johann Wolfgang von Goethe (Willkommen und Abschied, composed on 3 November), and Richard Dehmel (Die stille Stadt, composed on 7 October). Each song in the set was dedicated to a different family member, the dedication being referenced by their first name and not mentioning their last name: No. 1 was dedicated to "Mimí", née Mimi Kwast, Pfitzner's wife, who married him in 1899 and died five years after writing the set, in 1926; No. 2 was dedicated to "Pauli", Hans and Mimi's son Paul Pfitzner; No. 3 was dedicated to "Peti", Hans and Mimi's second son Peter Pfitzner, who was killed during World War II in 1944; and No. 4 was dedicated to "Agi", Hans and Mimi's daughter. None of the dedicatees survived the composer.

Four Songs was published in 1922 in Berlin by Adolph Fürstner. Many years later, Pfitzner recorded Abbitte in a performance with baritone Gerhard Hüsch and the composer himself at the piano, at Electrola Studios on February 10, 1939, in Cologne.

== Structure ==
This set is composed of four songs for unspecified voice and piano. The harmonic language used in the songs is different from the one used in previous Pfitzner songs. The tonal center of the first song is purposefully ambiguous: it is in no specific key, sometimes approaching atonality, but it ends with a D major triad chord. The second song is in G♯ minor, with the accompanying piano playing arpeggios to develop chords. The third song, the longest song in the set, is in B♭ major, with a central section that constantly changes its key, before returning to B♭ major once again for the coda. The last song is in E minor.

Following is the list of movements in the set:

1. Abbitte. Sehr langsam und feierlich
2. Herbsthauch. Ruhib, ergeben - Langsamer
3. Willkommen und Abschied. Sehr schnell und stürmisch - Ruhig beginnen, doch immer zügig, gleichsam alla breve - Wieder feurig - Erstes Zeitmaß
4. Die stille Stadt. Sehr ruhig und leise
