= Wechselmann =

Wechselmann is a surname. Notable people with the surname include:

- Erhard Wechselmann (1895–1943), German opera singer
- Ignaz Wechselmann (1828–1903), Hungarian architect and philanthropist
- Maj Wechselmann (born 1942), Danish-Swedish documentary director and filmmaker
