= Theater Ulm =

Theatre in Ulm, Germany

Coordinates: 48°24′05″N 9°59′12″E

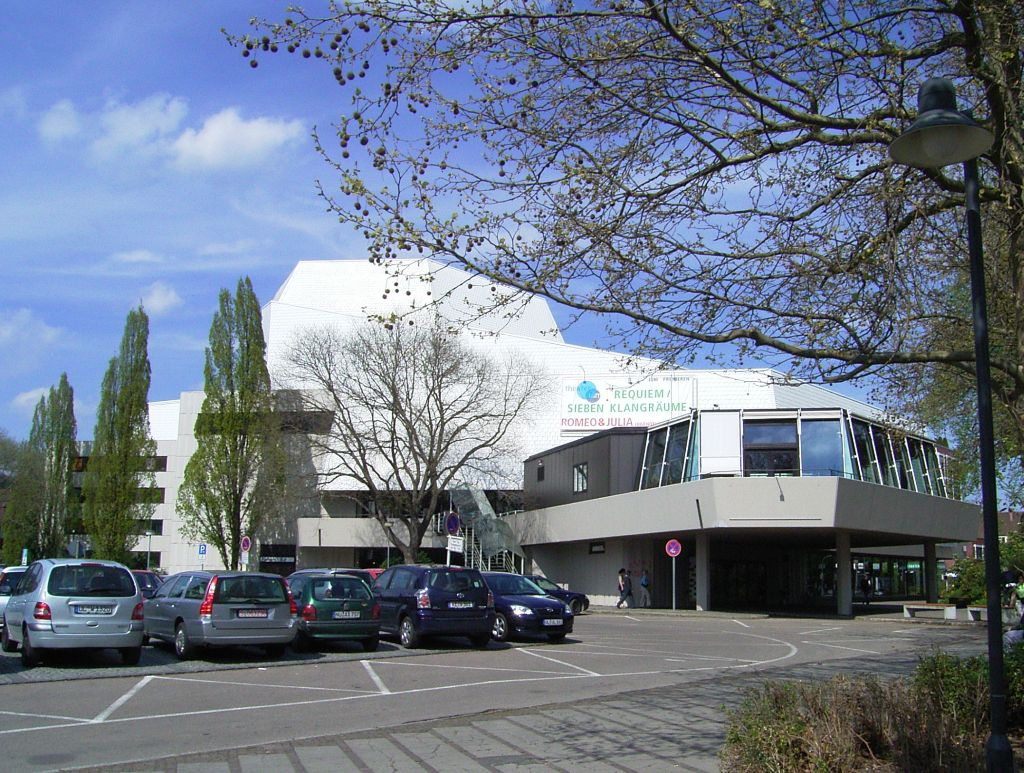
- Interactive map of Theater Ulm
- Former names: Ulmer Theater
- Address: Herbert-von-Karajan-Platz 1 Ulm; Germany
- Type: Theater

Construction
- Built: 1641
- Renovated: 1966–1969

Website
- theater-ulm.de

Theater Ulm is the municipal theater in the Baden-Württemberg city of Ulm in Germany. Founded in 1641, it is the oldest municipal theater in Germany. Today, it operates distinct ensembles for opera/operetta, acting, and ballet. Until 2006, it operated as Ulmer Theater.

The current building, at Herbert-von-Karajan-Platz 1, was built from 1966 to 1969, based on plans by Fritz Schäfer. It was opened on 3 October 1969.

== History ==
The earliest records of theater performances in Ulm date back to the early-16th century. In 1641, a theater was built based on plans by Joseph Furttenbach. This building was already equipped with a curtain and an orchestra pit and had stadium seating for 650 people, as well as standing room for 150. Audience capacity was upgraded to a total of 1,000 in 1650.

In 1780, the Ulm city council decided to have the municipal coach house be remodeled into a theater building. This building continued to be expanded and remodeled through the 19th century, with the last major expansion dating to 1923. Herbert von Karajan's first engagement was at this theater from 1929 to 1934.

Allied bombing sorties almost completely razed this building in 1944 and 1945. The gym hall of the Wagnerschule served as a makeshift replacement in the postwar years, until the opening of the current building in 1969.

== Intendants ==
- Erwin Dieterich (1925–1935)
- Reinhold Ockel (1935–1944)
- Alfred Mendler (1945–1950)
- Gustav Deharde (1950–1953)
- Peter Wackernagel (1954–1958, died during season break)
- Joachim von Groeling (provisional intendant, 1958–1959)
- Kurt Hübner (1959–1962)
- Ulrich Brecht (1962–1966)
- Detlof Krüger (1966–1973)
- Peter Borchardt (1973–1979)
- Volkmar Clauß (1979–1985)
- Pavel Fieber (1985–1991)
- Bernd Wilms (1991–1994)
- Ansgar Haag (1994–2006)
- Andreas von Studnitz (2006–2018)
- Kay Metzger (since 2018)

== Bibliography ==
- Das Ulmer Theater im neuen Haus: Sonderbeilage der Südwest Presse zur Eröffnung des neuen Ulmer Theaters am 3. Oktober 1969. Ulm, 1969
- Theater in Ulm. Compiled by Hans Radspieler, Ulm: Ulmer Volksbank, 1991
