= Luise Schulze-Berghof =

Luise Doris Albertine Ribbe Schulze-Berghof (14 June 1889 - 1970) was a German composer, pianist, and teacher who performed for Berlin television. She published and performed as Luise Schulze-Berghof.

Schulze-Berghof was born in Potsdam. She studied piano and composition at the Berlin Academy and with Johannes Schulze and Gustav Kulenkampff. Later, she taught piano and performed on Berlin television.

Schulze-Berghof was a member of the American Society of Composers, Authors, and Publishers (ASCAP). She set some of her own texts to music, as well as those by other authors. Her other compositions included:

== Selected works ==
=== Piano ===
- pieces

=== Vocal ===
- lieder and ballads on texts by Carl Hermann Busse, Richard Dehmel, Knodt, Detlev von Liliencron, Salus, and Else Lasker-Schueler

=== Theatre ===
- Frau Einsamkeit
