= Henriette Gottlieb =

German soprano

- Born: 1884; Berlin, Germany
- Died: 8 April 1994 (aged 90); Łódź Ghetto
- Occupation: Operatic soprano

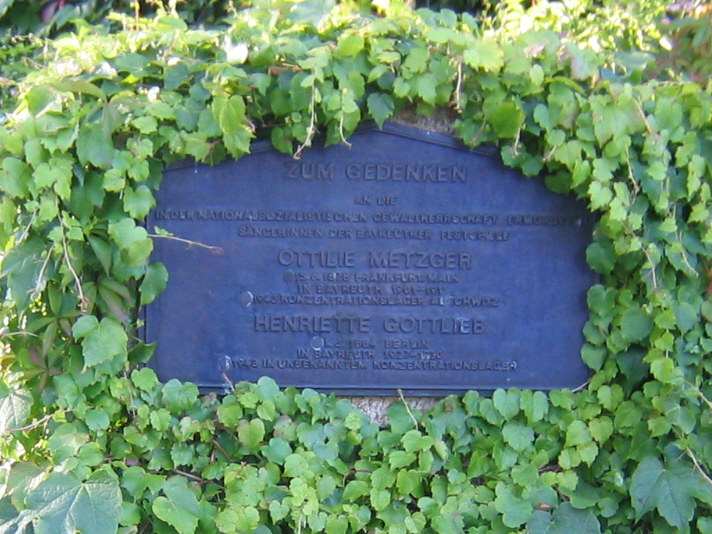
Plaque at the Festspielpark Bayreuth memorial to Henriette Gottlieb and Ottilie Metzger

Henriette Gottlieb (1884 – 2 January 1942) was a German soprano.

Gottlieb was born in Berlin. She performed the Wagnerian role of Brünnhilde at the Théâtre des Champs-Élysées, Paris, in a 1929 performance of Der Ring des Nibelungen. She also performed in the premiere of operas in Berlin, Friedrich Koch's Die Hügelmühle in 1918 and Emil von Reznicek's Holofernes in 1923. Following the Nazi ban on Jewish performers, she lived in Berlin until she was deported to the Łódź Ghetto (in the General Government region of occupied Poland) in 1941. She died there on 2 January 1942.

She was noted for her performances and recordings of Wagner's Brünnhilde:

Gramophone

— "The cast also includes the diminutive soprano Henriette Gottlieb, a fine singer who perished at Auschwitz 13 years later. Gottlieb makes a decidedly feminine Brunnhilde (more a Lehmann than a Leider) and von Hoesslin's conducting generates considerable excitement. The untameable 78rpm originals have been dealt with as skilfully as possible, using copies."

s

== Recordings ==
- Fidelio – Quartets from Acts I and II
- mp3 ♪ Wagner - 'Die Walküre': "Nun zäume dein Ross" (with Ludwig Weber; Paris, 1930) ♪
