= Five Songs, Op. 26 (Pfitzner) =

1916 song cycle by Hans Pfitzner

Five Songs
- by Hans Pfitzner
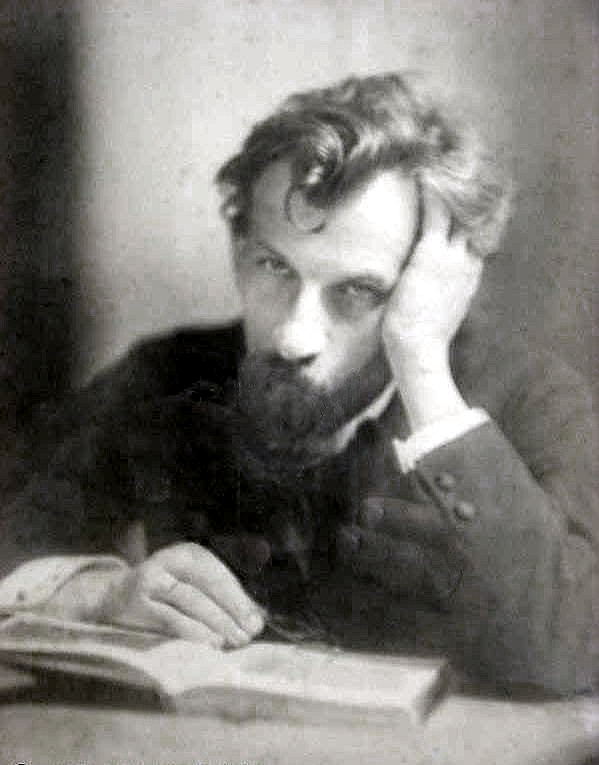
- Hans Pfitzner ca. 1910
- Native name: Fünf Lieder
- Opus: 26
- Year: 1916
- Published: 1916 - Leipzig
- Publisher: Max Brockhaus
- Movements: 5
- Scoring: Voice and piano

Five Songs, Op. 26 (German: Fünf Lieder), is a song cycle by German composer Hans Pfitzner. It was written in 1916.

== Background ==
This set of five songs was written in 1916 in Strasbourg. Pfitzner set the following homonymous poems: Gebet, composed in August 16 in Salzburg, is based on a poem originally written by Friedrich Hebbel for his Gedichte; Nachts and Neue Liebe, written on August 9 and 12 also in Salzburg, are based on poems written by Joseph von Eichendorff for his own Gedichte; Trauerstille, composed on August 19, was written after a poem by Gottfried August Bürger and first published in 1789 in the Lyrische Gedichte collection; and Mailied, composed in August 22, is based on a poem written by Johann Wolfgang von Goethe in 1771. The whole set was dedicated to Mientje Lamprecht van Lammen. It premiered on November 10, 1916, in Strasbourg and was published that same year by Max Brockhaus in Leipzig in 1916.

== Structure ==
Five Songs is scored for middle or high voice and piano. Gebet, the first song, is in A♭ major, even though Pfitzner wrote an alternate version for a lower voice in F major. Nachts, the second song in the set, is in B♭ major. Neue Liebe is in A major (wrongly described as a piece in A♭ major), and it has an alternate adaptation by Pfitzner in F major. Trauerstille is described as a sonet in C major. Finally, Mailied is in the key of A♭ major, even though Pfitzner also wrote an alternate lower version in E major. The movement list is as follows:

1. Gebet. Ruhig schwebend
2. Nachts. Ruhig
3. Neue Liebe. Froh und drängend
4. Trauerstille (Sonett). Sehr langsam und müde
5. Mailied. Bewegt, froh, nicht leidenschaftlich

== Recordings ==
Pfitzner recorded the second song in this cycle at the piano, with baritone Gerhard Hüsch at Electrola Studios on February 10, 1939, in Cologne. Complete recordings of the set are rare, as the voice required is expected to have a different range in each song.
