= Duo (Pfitzner) =

Duo for Violin, Cello, and Small Orchestra
- by Hans Pfitzner
- Native name: Duo für Violine und Cello mit kleinem Orchester
- Opus: 43
- Year: 1937
- Dedication: Max Strub; Ludwig Hoelscher
- Published: 1937 - Leipzig
- Publisher: F. E. C. Leuckart
- Duration: 13 minutes approx.
- Movements: 3
- Scoring: Violin, cello, and orchestra

The Duo for Violin, Cello, and Small Orchestra, Op. 43 (German: Duo für Violine und Cello mit kleinem Orchester), sometimes also referred to as the Duo for Violin, Cello, and Orchestra or, simply, the Duo, is a composition by German composer Hans Pfitzner. It was finished in 1937.

== Background ==
The Duo was finished in 1937. It received its world premiere on 3 December, 1937, at the Museumskonzert in Frankfurt, Germany, performed by Max Strub at the violin, Ludwig Hoelscher at the cello, and the composer conducting. It was dedicated to the two soloists. The duo was published that same year, in 1937, as a reduction for violin, cello, and piano, in Leipzig by F.E.C. Leuckart. The full orchestral score was not published until many years after the composer's death, in 1964.

== Structure ==
The piece is structured into three movements (or a single movement in three distinct sections). It is scored for two soloists, a violin and a cello, with a reduced orchestra consisting ot two flutes, two clarinets in B♭, two bassons, two French horns, and a string section. It has an approximate duration of 13 minutes. The movement list is as follows:

1. Allegro moderato – Etwas langsamer
2. Moderato
3. Ganze Takte – Schneller

Even though it is scored in the fashion of a double concerto, Pfitzner specified that it should not be regarded as a virtuosistic or concertante piece, but rather as a chamber piece, especially when performing the violin, cello, and piano reduction. He went further and stated that the two solo players should "never perform their parts from memory, but should play seated at the stand, reading from the score."

== Recordings ==
The following is a list of recordings of the Duo for Violin, Cello, and Small Orchestra:

Recordings of Pfitzner's Duo for Violin, Cello, and Small Orchestra
Violin	Cello	Conductor	Orchestra	Date of recording	Place of recording	Label
Max Strub	Ludwig Hoelscher	Hans Pfitzner	Staatskapelle Berlin	February 1938	Berlin, Germany	EMI Classics
Gergana Gergova	Alban Gerhardt	Sebastian Weigle	Rundfunk-Sinfonieorchester Berlin	June 2012	Haus des Rundfunks, Berlin, Germany	Hyperion Records
