= Felix Wolfes =

German-American educator, conductor, and composer (1892–1971)

Felix Wolfes (September 2, 1892 in Hannover – March 28, 1971 in Boston) was an American educator, conductor and composer.

== Biography ==
Felix was born to Jewish parents in Hannover, Germany. After graduating from high school, he attended the Leipzig Conservatory, where he studied music theory with Max Reger and piano with Robert Teichmüller. He also studied with Richard Strauss and later in Strasbourg with Hans Pfitzner. His conducting debut was in Breslau in 1923. He then worked as musical director and opera conductor in Essen (1924–1931) and Dortmund (until 1933).

In Dortmund he had to leave his position in the spring of 1933 due to the Nazi rise to power. He emigrated first to France and later to the US. He conducted the Monte Carlo opera in 1936 and 1937. While in France, he was also the teacher of composer Lukas Foss, who studied orchestration with him.

In 1938 he moved to New York City, where he worked as an assistant conductor at the Metropolitan Opera, where he stayed until 1947. In 1948 he followed a call to the New England Conservatory in Boston, where he taught for two decades. He died in Boston, aged 78.

== Musical compositions and editing ==
Wolfes composed at least 140 songs that are published. Most were composed after he moved to Boston, but he continued to set German poetry. There are a few songs in English, however. As a disciple of Strauss and Pfitzner, Wolfes composed vocal works using similar complex rhythmic and harmonic materials.

He was also highly skilled in editing and preparing the vocal scores for operas from the full orchestral score. Some of his important work in this area was for the Strauss opera Arabella and the Pfitzner opera Palestrina. He also prepared vocal scores for Strauss's opera Die schweigsame Frau and Pfitzner's operas Das Herz and Die Rose vom Liebesgarten.

== Works ==
Ausgewählte Lieder in 5 Bänden für Singstimme und Klavier (Selected Songs in Five Volumes), Mercury Music Corporation, New York 1962

Volume I, songs for high voice

- 1. Die Nachtigall (Theodor Storm), 1930
- 2. Weihnachten (Joseph von Eichendorff), 1940
- 3. Weinende Frau (Friedrich Schnack), 1943
- 4. Auf dem See (Ernst Bertram), 1943
- 5. Todelust (Joseph von Eichendorff), 1944
- 6. Du schlank und rein wie eine Flamme (Stefan George), 1944
- 7. Spruch des Engels (Hugo von Hofmannsthal), 1945
- 8. Vorfrühling (Hugo von Hofmannsthal), 1947
- 9. Totengräber und Mädchen (Friedrich Schnack), 1949
- 10. Möwenflug (Conrad Ferdinand Meyer), 1950

Volume II, songs for high voice

- 11. Blume, Baum, Vogel (Hermann Hesse), 1951
- 12. Ein Winterabend (Georg Trakl), 1952
- 13. Tief in den Himmel verklingt (Ricarda Huch), 1952
- 14. Dämmrung senkte sich von oben (Goethe), 1953
- 15. Herbstliche Tröstung (Werner Bergengruen), 1956
- 16. An eine Strophe (Ernst Bertram), 1956
- 17. Gelassenheit (Wang We, tr. Manfred Hausmann), 1956
- 18. Lied (Wilhelm Klemm), 1957
- 19. Erdgewalt (Rudolf G. Binding), 1958
- 20. Blühender Kirschbaum (Christian Wagner), 1958

Volume III, songs for medium voice

- 1. Die Zeder, 1962
- 2. Immer Wieder, 1962
- 3. Auf dem See, 1962
- 4. Der Feind, 1962
- 5. Auf Wanderung, 1962
- 6. Herbst, 1962
- 7. Stimme der Mutter, 1962
- 8. Am Ziele, 1962
- 9. Das letzte Haus, 1962

Volume IV, songs for medium voice

- 10. In einer Dämmerstunde (Wilhelm von Scholz), 1955
- 11. Oase El Kjem (Albert H. Rausch), 1955
- 12. Vergiss, vergiss (Rainer Maria Rilke), 1956
- 13. Verschneiter Fluss (Liu Dsung-Yüan, tr. Manfred Hausmann)
- 14. Zigeunerlied (Johann Wolfgang von Goethe), 1956
- 15. Erdgewalt (Rudolf G. Binding), 1958
- 16. Gelbe Rose(Ludwig Strauss), 1958
- 17. Gefunden (Johann Wolfgang von Goethe), 1958

Volume V, songs for low voice

Selected Lieder, ed. John S. Bowman and Richard Aslanian, Theodore Presser Company, Bryn Mawr, Pennsylvania

Volume VI, songs for high voice, 1987

- 1. Unter den Sternen (Conrad Ferdinand Meyer), 1948
- 2. Todesmusick (Franz von Schober), 1960
- 3. Herbstbild (Friedrich Hebbel), 1960
- 4. Venedig (Friedrich Nietzsche)
- 5. Kleine Rat (Wolfgang Amadeus Mozart), 1961
- 6. In den Nachmittag geflüstert (Georg Trakl), 1961
- 7. Das Ende des Festes (Conrad Ferdinand Meyer), 1963
- 8. Der Hecht (Christian Morgenstern), 1963
- 9. Rotkehlchen (Wilhelm Busch), 1964
- 10. Frühlingslied (Friederike Kempner), 1965
- 11. Auf eine Lampe (Eduard Mörike), 1968

Volume VII, songs for medium voice, 1987

- 1. Verklärter Herbst (Georg Trakl), 1940
- 2. Nachklänge Beethovenscher Musik (Clemens Brentano), 1952
- 3. Der Einsiedler (Joseph von Eichendorff), 1953
- 4. Es geht eine dunkle Wolk' herein (German Folksong from the Thirty Years' War), 1953
- 5. Verfall (Georg Trakl), 1953
- 6. Septembermorgen (Eduard Mörike), 1955
- 7. Ein Traum ist unser Leben (Johann Gottfried von Herder), 1956
- 8. Das trunkne Lied (Friedrich Nietzsche), 1961
- 9. Es ist ein Schnee gefallen (15th century German Folksong), 1962
- 10. Eingelegte Ruder (Conrad Ferdinand Meyer), 1963
- 11. Die beiden Esel (Christian Morgenstern), 1963
- 12. Inschrift auf eine Uhr mit den drei Horen (Eduard Mörike), 1965
- 13. Gesang einer gefangenen Amsel (Georg Trakl), 1965
- 14. In ein altes Stammbuch (Georg Trakl), 1965
- 15. Früh im Wagen (Eduard Mörike), 1967

Volume VIII, songs for low voice, 1991

- 1. Abschied vom Leben (Stefan Zweig), 1952
- 2. Lied Kaspar Hausers (Paul Verlaine, tr. Richard Dehmel), 1926
- 3. Die stille Stadt (Richard Dehmel), 1951
- 4. Grabschrift eines Mannes (Rudolf Binding), 1959
- 5. Die zwei Brüder (Paul Pfitzner), 1959
- 6. In der letzten Stunde (Paul Pfitzner), 1959
- 7. Die Hölle (Manfred Hausmann), 1962
- 8. Ein Mönch spricht zu Gott (Wilhelm von Scholz), 1966
- 9. Schlaf ein! (Alexander von Bernus), 1966
- 10. Abendgespräch (Hermann Hesse), 1966
- 11. Verlorenheit (Hermann Hesse), 1967
- 12. Im Nebel (Hermann Hesse), 1941
- 13. Allein (Hermann Hesse), 1945

Volume IX, songs for high voice, 1991

- 1. Die Birke (Hermann Hesse), 1951
- 2. Über die Felder (Hermann Hesse), 1951
- 3. Am einen Schmetterling (Josef Weinheber), 1952
- 4. Die Schritte (Albrecht Goes), 1960
- 5. Am eine Tote (Josef Weinheber), 1960
- 6. Traumboot (Manfred Hausmann), 1961
- 7. Im Grase hingestreckt (Hermann Hesse), 1962
- 8. Verlorener Klang (Hermann Hesse), 1962
- 9. Was ist die Welt? (Hugo von Hofmannsthal), 1962
- 10. Weisse Wolken (Hermann Hesse), 1963
- 11. Spätblau (Hermann Hesse), 1964
- 12. Symphonie (Hermann Hesse), 1964

Volume X, songs for medium voice, 1992

- 1. Bei Mondaufgang (Sao-Han, tr. Hans Bethge), 1946
- 2. Sylphide, Josef Weinheber), 1955
- 3. Scheidende Seele (Albrecht Schaeffer), 1956
- 4. Heim in den Anbeginn (Werner Bergengruen), 1956
- 5. Am Gartenfenster (Albrecht Goes), 1958
- 6. Das Glasperlenspiel (Hermann Hesse), 1958
- 7. Spruch für eine Sonnenuhr (Rudolf G. Binding), 1958
- 8. Jahraus-Jahrein (Josef Weinheber), 1959
- 9. Zu Musik (Ricarda Huch), 1959
- 10. Die Liebenden (Georg von der Vring), 1959
- 11. Still zu wissen... (Josef Weinheber), 1961
- 12. Die Frauen von Ravenna (Hermann Hesse), 1961
- 13. Volkslied (After the French) (Manfred Hausmann), 1963

Volume XI, songs for medium voice, 1992

- 1. Den Toten (Josef Weinheber), 1953
- 2. Eisnacht (Siegbert Stehmann), 1954
- 3. Tausend Male (Christian Wagner), 1958
- 4. Ecce homo! (Veikko Antero Koskenniemi, tr. Johannes Öhquist), 1960
- 5. Nacht (Bo Djü, tr. Manfred Hausmann), 1960
- 6. Nachtlied (Georg von der Vring), 1962
- 7. Der Tod (Bernhard von der Marwitz), 1963
- 8. Der Dichter (Hermann Hesse), 1964
- 9. Kleiner Gesang (Hermann Hesse), 1964
- 10. Märzsonne (Hermann Hesse), 1969
- 11. Knarren eines geknickten Astes (Hermann Hesse), 1964
- 12. Aufgehender Mond (Georg von der Vring), 1965

Volume XII, songs for high voice, 1996

- 1. Brunnen-Inschrift (Wilhelm von Scholz), 1945
- 2. Nun leuchtet schon wieder (Unknown poet), 1951
- 3a. Die kleine Passion (original version) (Gottfried Keller), 1954
- 3b. Die kleine Passion (abridged version), 1954
- 4. Orpheus (Rudolf Binding), 1960
- 5. Relief (Saladin Schmitt), 1961
- 6. Andenken (Lili Medhat), 1962
- 7. Rote Pantoffeln (Heinrich Heine), 1962
- 8. Melodie (Ricarda Huch), 1962
- 9. An einen Dichter (Albrecht Schaeffer), 1963
- 10. Manche Nacht (Richard Dehmel), 1967

Volume XIII, settings of poems by Hermann Hesse, ed. Richard Aslanian, 2008

- 1. Nacht, 1966
- 2. Traurigkeit, 1966
- 3. Weisse Rose in der Dämmerung, 1966
- 4. Weg in die Einsamkeit, 1967
- 5. Bei Nacht, 1967
- 6. Leise wie die Gondeln..., 1967
- 7. Spruch, 1968
- 8. Verwelkende Rosen, 1968
- 9. Sprache des Frühlings, 1968
- 10. Aufhorchen, 1968
- 11. Bei der Nachtricht vom Tod eines Freundes, 1968
- 12. Herbstvögel, 1969
- 13. Hingabe, 1969
- 14. Wie eine Welle, 1969
- 15. Kindheit des Zauberers, 1969
- 16. Der Blütenzweig, 1969
- 17. Aus der Kindheit her, 1969

== See also ==
- Richard Strauss
- Hans Pfitzner
