= Damir Imamović =

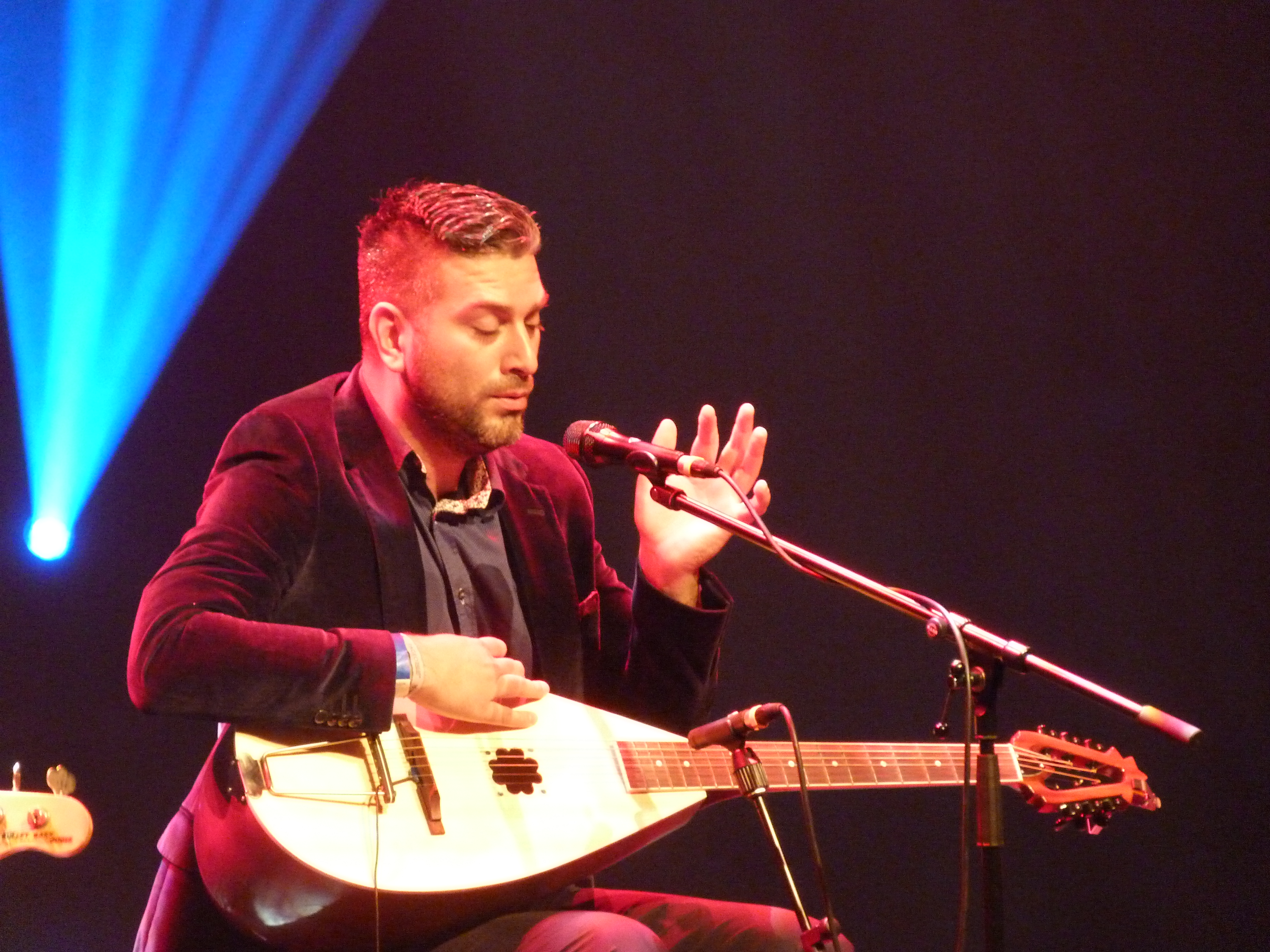
- Born: 1978 (age 47–48); Sarajevo, SR Bosnia and Herzegovina, SFR Yugoslavia
- Occupation: Vocalist
- Years active: 2004–present
- Relatives: Zaim Imamović (grandfather)
- Musical career
- Genres: sevdalinka
- Instrument: vocals

Damir Imamović (born in 1978) is a Bosnian singer-songwriter. His music is mostly in the traditional Bosnian genre of "sevdalinka" or "sevdah". His 2020 Album Singer of Tales won the 2021 Songlines Music Awards for Best European Album, and Imamović himself was nominated for Best Artist.

== Early life ==
Imamović was born in Sarajevo, Bosnia and Herzegovina into a musical family. His father Nedžad Imamović (1948-2020), was a bass player, producer, singer and author, while his paternal grandfather Zaim Imamović (1920–1994), was a traditional Bosnian folk singer who achieved fame in the 1940s and 1960s.

In 1992, when Imamović was 14, his hometown of Sarajevo was besieged as part of the ongoing Bosnian War. Imamović would remain trapped in Sarajevo with the rest of its residents until 1995. It was during this time that Imamović began to learn to play his first instrument, the guitar.

Imamović's music teachers included Spaso Berak, multiinstrumentalist and sevdah arranger for Himzo Polovina), as well as saz player Hašim Muharemović and sevdah singer Emina Zečaj.

== Career ==
Imamović held his first concert in The Art Gallery of Bosnia and Herzegovina, in Sarajevo, in 2004. Soon after he played numerous concerts in Bosnia and Herzegovina and in the region of the former Yugoslavia, after the first CD with his Damir Imamović Trio was released in 2006. His most acclaimed CD was "Abrašević Live" which was to appear in 2008. It won him the "Davorin" music award of Bosnia and Herzegovina, as well as numerous international tours and performances in important festivals such as: Druga Godba (Slovenia), Jazz Fest Sarajevo (BIH). The "Abrašević Live" also features Damir's first sevdah compositions based on the traditional lyrics "Dva se draga".

Renowned Bosnian/Croatian filmmaker Marina Andree-Škop collaborated with Damir Imamović in crafting the documentary film "Sevdah," rekindling the interest of a younger audience in this ancient art form. The film earned accolades, securing the Audience Award, "The Heart of Sarajevo," at the Sarajevo Film Festival in 2009.

Damir's solo ventures showcase a distinctive, more intimate style. His live performances in Sarajevo's summer gardens garnered considerable acclaim, prompting the release of the live album "Svrzina Kuća" on 9 October 2011 by the Sarajevo-based record label iTM. The album features recordings from Damir's captivating shows held on 27 and 28 July 2011 at the historic Svrzo house in Sarajevo.

In 2012 Damir formed "Damir Imamović's Sevdah Takht," featuring Ivan Mihajlović (electric bass, from Belgrade) and Nenad Kovačić (percussion, from Zagreb). The trio made notable appearances at prestigious music festivals across Europe, including Druga Godba (Slovenia), Balkan Trafik (Belgium), Culturscapes (Switzerland), and TFF Rudolstadt (Germany). In 2015, Sarajevo-based violinist Ivana Djurić joined the ensemble.

The quartet showcased their musical prowess at the WOMEX 2015 festival in Budapest. In 2015, Glitterbeat Records signed the quartet, and their inaugural album is set for international release on 29 April 2016, with the first single, "Sarajevo," hitting the airwaves on 13 February 2016.

Beyond his musical contributions, Damir Imamović is a dedicated sevdah researcher, educator, and producer. In 2014, he produced and released the album "The Art of Saz" by Ćamil Metiljević, a sevdah master from an older generation. Additionally, he played a pivotal role in producing the debut album "The House of Saz" by young saz player Jusuf Brkić.

== Research, education, authorship ==
- "Sevdah" a book on history of the sevdah genre by Damir Imamović (Vrijeme, Zenica, B-H, 2016; in English in 2017)
- "Sevdah, the art of freedom", a multimedia exhibition by Damir Imamović (Art Gallery of Bosnia and Herzegovina, Sarajevo, November 2015).
- SevdahLab, an educational program on history, performance and studies of the genre of sevdah (sevdalinka) by Damir Imamović (since 2013). SevdahLab lectures and workshops were held around the world.

== Discography ==
- with Damir Imamović Trio
  - Svira Standarde (buybook, 2006)
  - Abrašević live (samizdat, 2008)
- Solo
  - Damir Imamović (Gramofon, 2010)
  - Svrzina Kuća (iTM, The House of Svrzo, 2011)
- with Sevdah Takt
  - Sevdah Takht (iTM, 2012)
  - Dvojka (Glitterbeat Records, 2016), produced by Chris Eckman
- with Ivana Djuric, Derya Türkan and Greg Cohen (produced by Joe Boyd and Andrea Goertler)
  - Singer of Tales (Wrasse Records, 2020), the album was proclaimed "The Best European World Music Album" by Transglobal World Music Annual Charts in 2020.
