= Michael Schiefel =

German singer

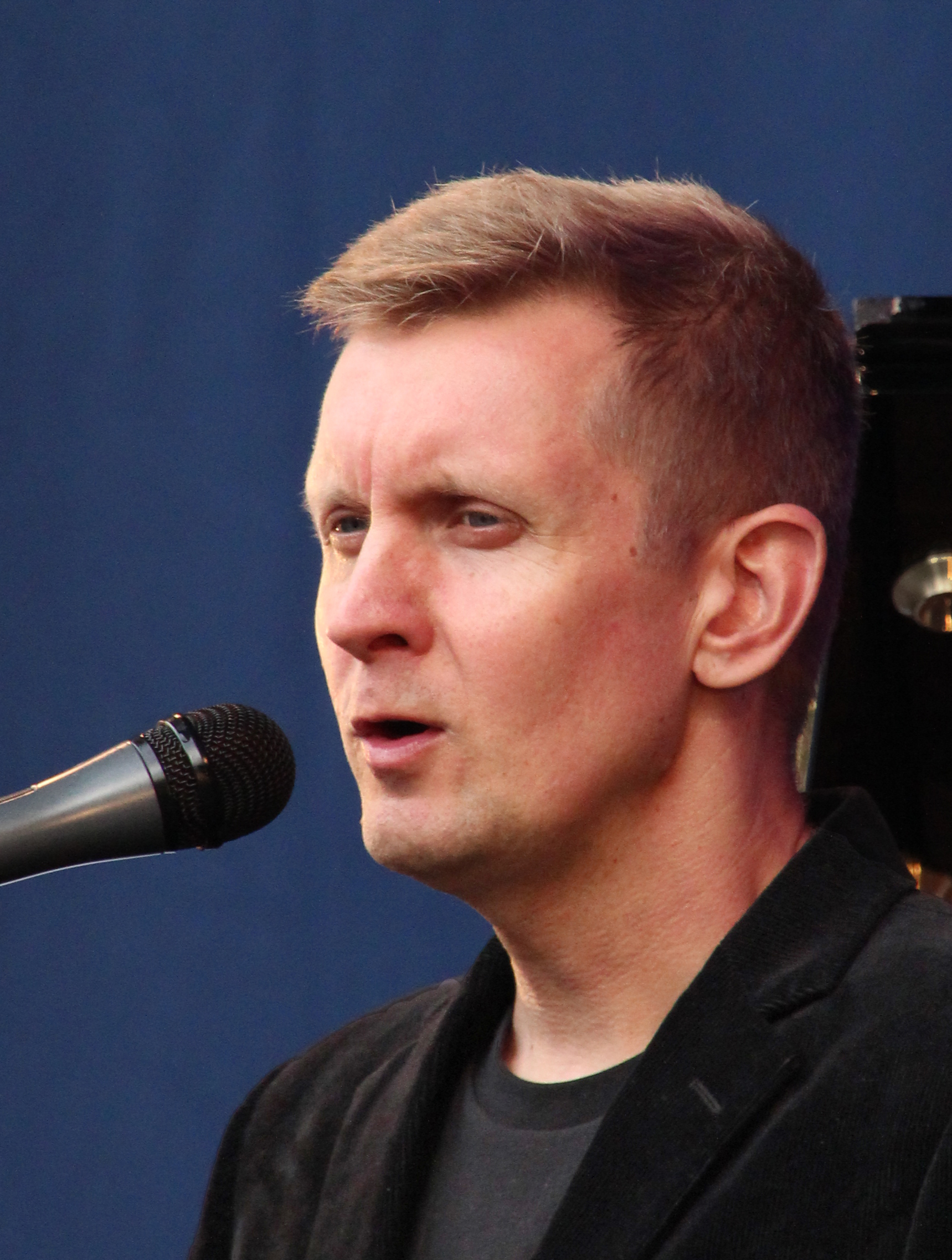
- Michael Schiefel in 2017

Background information
- Born: Michael Schiefel
- Origin: Münster, West Germany
- Genres: Jazz, Experimental
- Occupation(s): Singer, songwriter
- Years active: 1990s–present
- Labels: ACT; Traumton
- Website: www.michaelschiefel.com

Michael Schiefel (born 1970 in Münster, West Germany) is a jazz and experimental singer.

He studied in Berlin University of the Arts and graduated in 1996 with a High Honours Diplom in vocal jazz and music education. He is currently a professor of jazz vocal in the Franz Liszt Conservatory of Music in Weimar, a position he has held since 2001.

== Discography ==
=== Solo albums ===
- 1997: Invisible Loop
- 2001: I Don't Belong
- 2006: Don't Touch My Animals
- 2010: My Home Is My Tent

=== With Jazz Indeed ===
- 1996: Under Water
- 1998: Who the Moon Is
- 2005: Blaue Augen
