= Five Songs, Op. 22 (Pfitzner) =

Five Songs
- by Hans Pfitzner
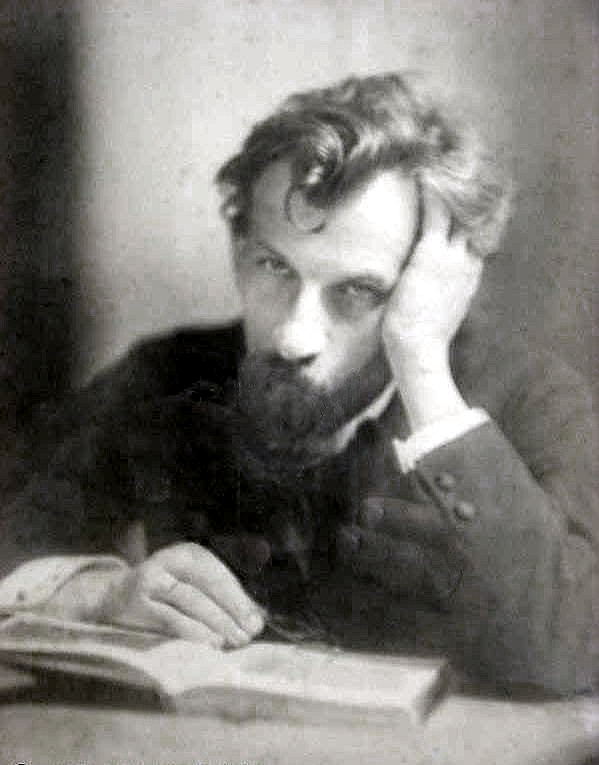
- Hans Pfitzner ca. 1910
- Native name: Fünf Lieder
- Opus: 22
- Year: 1907
- Text: Joseph von Eichendorff; Adelbert von Chamisso; Gottfried August Bürger
- Language: German
- Dedication: Johan Messchaert; Rudolf Moest; Fritz Feinhals; Helene Staegemann
- Published: 1907 - Leipzig
- Publisher: Max Brockhaus
- Movements: 5
- Scoring: Voice and piano

Five Songs, Op. 22 (German: Fünf Lieder), is a song cycle by German composer Hans Pfitzner.

== Background ==
Five Songs, Op. 22, was completed in 1907. It set homonymous poems by Joseph von Eichendorff (In Danzig), Adelbert von Chamisso (Tragische Geschichte, taken from his own Lieder und lyrisch epische Gedichte), and Gottfried August Bürger (Schön Suschen; Gegenliebe, originally published in 1803; and An die Bienen, in 1835). Dedicated respectively to Johan Messchaert (Nos. 1–2), Rudolf Moest (No. 3), Fritz Feinhals (No. 4), and Helene Staegemann (No. 5). It was published in Leipzig in 1907 by long-time publisher Max Brockhaus.

== Structure ==
The set consists of five songs for voice and piano. The voice is generally a high-ranging baritone, even though the last song actually employs a high soprano instead of a male voice. The movement list is as follows:

1. In Danzig
2. Tragische Geschichte
3. Schön Suschen
4. Gegenliebe
5. An die Bienen
