= Die Rose vom Liebesgarten =

1900 opera by Hans Pfitzner

- Opera by Hans Pfitzner
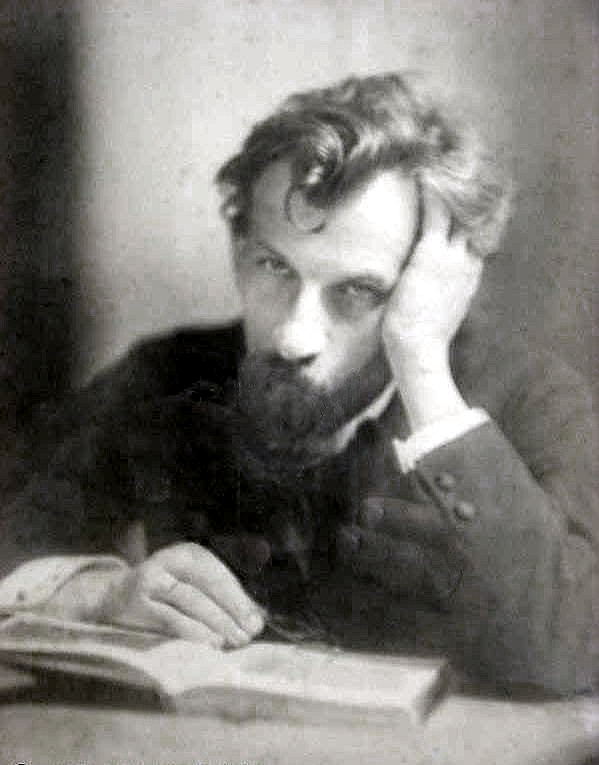
- The composer c. 1910
- Librettist: James Grun
- Language: German
- Based on: Hans Thoma's painting Der Wächter vor dem Liebesgarten
- Premiere: 9 November 1901; Elberfeld

Die Rose vom Liebesgarten (The Rose from the Garden of Love) is a 1900 opera by Hans Pfitzner to a libretto by James Grun, one of Pfitzner's fellow students at the Hoch Conservatory in Frankfurt, which had been prompted by an 1890 painting by Hans Thoma, Der Wächter vor dem Liebesgarten (The Guardian Before the Garden of Love).

The first act was first premiered in concert in March 1900 where it was poorly received between two pieces by Richard Strauss. The premiere on 9 November 1901 in Elberfeld was better received, followed by performances in Mannheim, Bremen, Munich and Hamburg. The opera was published in 1901 and received its first truly successful staging by Gustav Mahler in Vienna in 1905.
