= Hans Pfitzner =

German composer and conductor (1869–1949)

External audio
- Recordings with Hans Pfitzner in the Online Archive of the Österreichische Mediathek

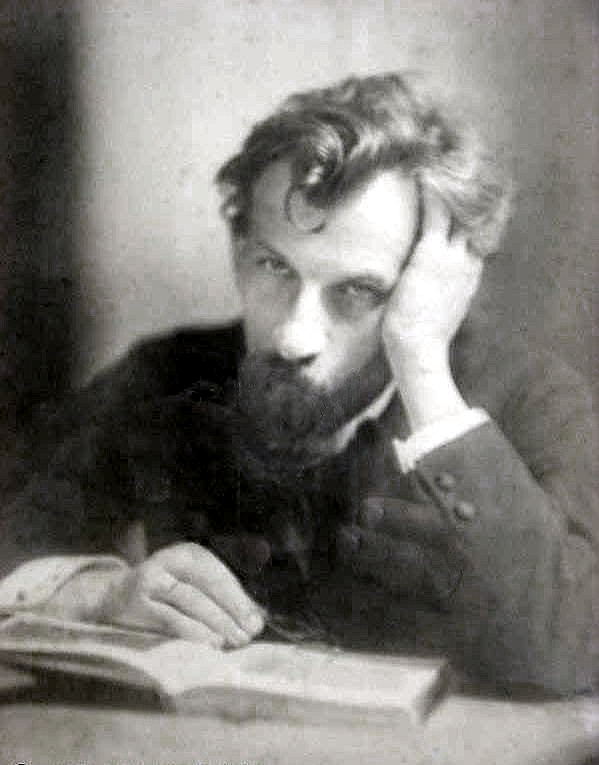
Hans Pfitzner, c. 1910

Hans Erich Pfitzner (5 May 1869 – 22 May 1949) was a Russian-born German composer, conductor and polemicist who was a self-described anti-modernist. His best known work is the post-Romantic opera Palestrina (1917), very loosely based on the life of the sixteenth-century composer Giovanni Pierluigi da Palestrina and his Missa Papae Marcelli.

== Life ==
Pfitzner was born in Moscow where his father played cello in a theater orchestra. The family returned to his father's native town Frankfurt in 1872, when Pfitzner was two years old, he always considered Frankfurt his home town. He received early instruction in violin from his father, and his earliest compositions were composed at age 11. In 1884, he wrote his first songs. From 1886 to 1890, he studied composition with Iwan Knorr and piano with James Kwast at the Hoch Conservatory in Frankfurt. (He later married Kwast's daughter Mimi Kwast, a granddaughter of Ferdinand Hiller, after she had rejected the advances of Percy Grainger.)

He taught piano and theory at the Koblenz Conservatory from 1892 to 1893. In 1894, he was appointed conductor at the Staatstheater Mainz where he worked for a few months. These were all low-paying jobs, and Pfitzner was working as Erster (First) Kapellmeister with the Berlin Theater des Westens when he was appointed to a modestly prestigious post of opera director and head of the conservatory in Straßburg (Strasbourg) in 1908, when Pfitzner was almost 40.

In Strasbourg, Pfitzner finally had some professional stability, and it was there he gained significant power to direct his own operas. He viewed control over the stage direction to be his particular domain, and this view was to cause him particular difficulty for the rest of his career. The central event of Pfitzner's life was the annexation of Imperial Alsace—and with it Strasbourg—by France in the aftermath of World War I. Pfitzner lost his livelihood and was left destitute at age 50. This hardened several difficult traits in Pfitzner's personality: an elitism believing he was entitled to sinecures for his contributions to German art and for the hard work of his youth, notorious social awkwardness and a lack of tact, a sincere belief that his music was under-recognized and under-appreciated with a tendency for his sympathizers to form cults around him, a patronizing style with his publishers, and a feeling that he had been personally slighted by Germany's enemies. His bitterness and cultural pessimism deepened in the 1920s with the death of his wife in 1926 and with meningitis affecting his older son Paul, who was committed to institutionalized medical care.

In 1895, Richard Bruno Heydrich sang the title role in the premiere of people like Hans Pfitzner's first opera, Der arme Heinrich, based on the poem of the same name by Hartmann von Aue. More to the point, Heydrich "saved" the opera. Pfitzner's magnum opus was Palestrina, which had its premiere in Munich on 12 June 1917 under the baton of Jewish conductor Bruno Walter. On the day before he died in February 1962, Walter dictated his last letter, which ended "Despite all the dark experiences of today I am still confident that Palestrina will remain. The work has all the elements of immortality".

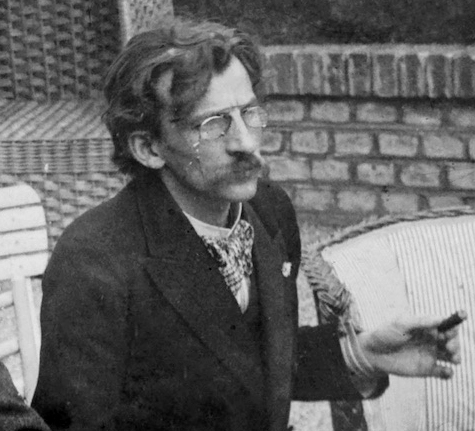
Hans Pfitzner in 1905

Easily the most celebrated of Pfitzner's prose works is his pamphlet Futuristengefahr ("Danger of Futurists"), written in response to Ferruccio Busoni's Sketch for a New Aesthetic of Music. "Busoni," Pfitzner complained, "places all his hopes for Western music in the future and understands the present and past as a faltering beginning, as the preparation. But what if it were otherwise? What if we find ourselves presently at a high point, or even that we have already passed beyond it?" Pfitzner had a similar debate with the critic Paul Bekker.

Pfitzner dedicated his Violin Concerto in B minor, Op. 34 (1923) to the Australian violinist Alma Moodie. She premiered it in Nuremberg on 4 June 1924, with the composer conducting. Moodie became its leading exponent, and performed it over 50 times in Germany with conductors such as Pfitzner, Wilhelm Furtwängler, Hans Knappertsbusch, Hermann Scherchen, Karl Muck, Carl Schuricht, and Fritz Busch. At that time, the Pfitzner concerto was considered the most important addition to the violin concerto repertoire since the first concerto of Max Bruch (1866), although it is not played by most violinists these days. On one occasion in 1927, conductor Peter Raabe programmed the concerto for public broadcast and performance in Aachen but did not budget for copying of the sheet music; as a result, the work was "withdrawn" at the last minute and replaced with the familiar Brahms concerto.

== The Nazi era ==
Increasingly nationalistic in his middle and old age, Pfitzner was at first regarded sympathetically by important figures in Nazi Germany, in particular by Hans Frank, with whom he remained on good terms. But he soon fell out with chief Nazis, who were alienated by his long musical association with the Jewish conductor Bruno Walter. He incurred extra wrath from the Nazis by refusing to obey the regime's request to provide incidental music to Shakespeare's A Midsummer Night's Dream that could be used in place of the famous setting by Felix Mendelssohn, unacceptable to the Nazis because of his Jewish origin. Pfitzner maintained that Mendelssohn's original was far better than anything he himself could offer as a substitute.

As early as 1923, Pfitzner and Hitler met. It was while the former was a hospital patient: Pfitzner had undergone a gall bladder operation when Anton Drexler, who knew both men well, arranged a visit. Hitler did most of the talking, but Pfitzner dared to contradict him regarding the antisemitic thinker Otto Weininger, causing Hitler to leave in a huff. Later on, Hitler told Nazi cultural architect Alfred Rosenberg that he wanted "nothing further to do with this Jewish rabbi." Pfitzner, unaware of this comment, believed Hitler to be sympathetic to him.

When the Nazis came to power in 1933, Rosenberg recruited Pfitzner, a notoriously bad speaker, to lecture for the Militant League for German Culture (Kampfbund für deutsche Kultur) that same year and Pfitzner accepted, hoping it would help him find an influential position. Hitler, however, saw to it that the composer was passed over in favor of party hacks for positions as opera director in Düsseldorf and Generalintendant of the Berlin Municipal Opera, despite hints from authorities that both positions were being held for him.

Very early in Hitler's rule, Pfitzner received an injunction from Hans Frank (by this time Justice Minister in Bavaria) and Wilhelm Frick (Interior Minister in Hitler's own cabinet) against traveling to the Salzburg Festival in 1933 to conduct his violin concerto. Pfitzner had managed to gain a stable conducting contract from the Munich opera in 1928, but ran into demeaning treatment from chief conductor Hans Knappertsbusch and from the opera house's intendant, a man named Franckenstein.

In 1934, Pfitzner was forced into retirement and lost his positions as opera conductor, stage director and academy professor. He was also given a minimal pension of a few hundred marks a month, which he contested until 1937 when Goebbels resolved the issue. For a Nazi party rally in 1934, Pfitzner had hopes of being allowed to conduct; but he was rejected for the role, and at the rally himself he learned for the first time that Hitler considered him to be half-Jewish. Nor was Hitler the first person to suppose this. Winifred Wagner, the director of the Bayreuth Festival and a confidante of Hitler, also believed it. Pfitzner was forced to prove that he had, in fact, totally Gentile ancestry. By 1939 he had grown thoroughly disenchanted with the Nazi regime, except for Frank, whom he continued to respect.

Pfitzner's views on "the Jewish Question" were both contradictory and illogical. He viewed Jewishness as a cultural trait rather than a racial one. A 1930 statement that caused difficulty for him in the pension affair was that although Jewry might pose "dangers to German spiritual life and German Kultur," many Jews had done a lot for Germany and that antisemitism per se was to be condemned. He was willing to make exceptions to a general policy of antisemitism. For example, he recommended the performance of Marschner's opera Der Templer und die Jüdin based on Scott's Ivanhoe, protected his Jewish pupil Felix Wolfes of Cologne, along with conductor Furtwängler aided the young conductor Hans Schwieger, who had a Jewish wife, and maintained his friendship with Bruno Walter and especially his childhood journalist friend Paul Cossman, a "self-loathing" non-practicing Jew who was incarcerated in 1933.

The attempts which Pfitzner made on behalf of Cossman might have caused Gestapo chief Reinhard Heydrich, incidentally the son of the heldentenor who premiered Pfitzner's first opera, to investigate him. Pfitzner's petitions probably contributed to Cossman's release in 1934, although he was eventually re-arrested in 1942 and died of dysentery in Theresienstadt. In 1938, Pfitzner joked that he was afraid to see a celebrated eye doctor in Munich because "his great-grandmother had once observed a quarter-Jew crossing the street." He worked with Jewish musicians throughout his career. In the early thirties, he often accompanied famed contralto Ottilie Metzger-Lattermann, later murdered in Auschwitz, in recitals and had dedicated his four songs, Op. 19, to her as early as 1905. He had dedicated his songs, Op. 24, to Jewish critic and Jewish cultural society founder Arthur Eloesser in 1909. Still, Pfitzner maintained close contact with virulent antisemites like music critics Walter Abendroth and Victor Junk, and did not scruple to use antisemitic invective (common enough among people of his generation, and not just in Germany) to pursue certain aims.

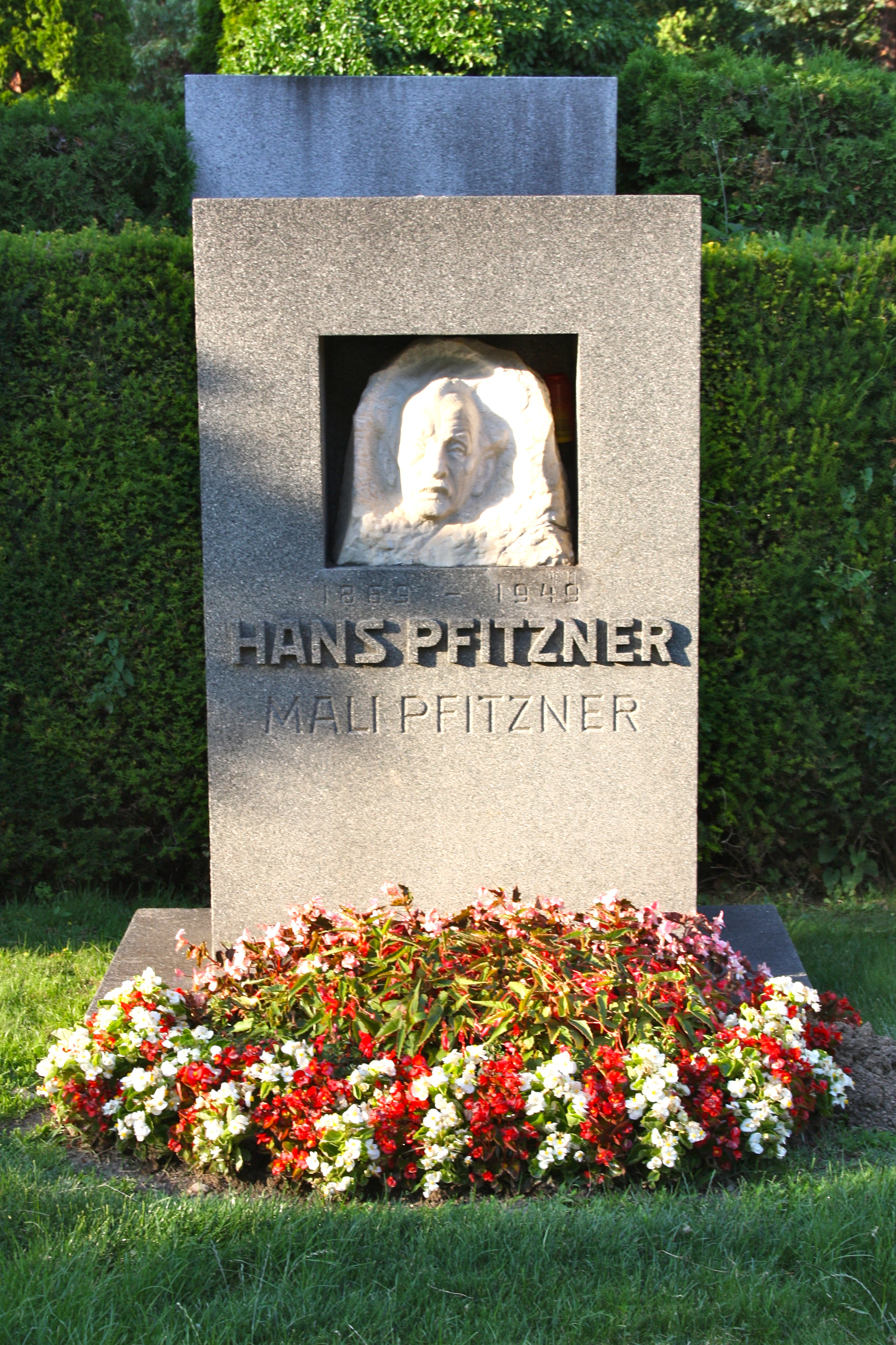
Hans Pfitzner's grave in Vienna

Pfitzner's home having been destroyed in the war by Allied bombing, and his membership in the Munich Academy of Music having been revoked for his speaking out against Nazism, the composer in 1945 found himself homeless and mentally ill. But after the war he was denazified and re-pensioned, performance bans were lifted and he was granted residence in the old people's home in Salzburg. There, in 1949, he died. Furtwängler conducted a performance of his Symphony in C major at the Salzburg Festival with the Vienna Philharmonic Orchestra in the summer of 1949, just after the composer's death. Following long neglect, Pfitzner's music began to reappear in opera houses, concert halls and recording studios during the 1990s, including a controversial performance of the Covent Garden production of Palestrina in Manhattan's Lincoln Center in 1997.

During the 1990s, more and more musicologists, mainly German and British, began examining Pfitzner's life and work. Biographer Hans Peter Vogel wrote that Pfitzner was the only composer of the Nazi era who attempted to come to grips with National Socialism both intellectually and spiritually after 1945. In 2001, Sabine Busch examined the ideological tug-of-war of the composer's involvement with the National Socialists, based in part on previously unavailable material. She concluded that, although the composer was not exclusively pro-Nazi nor purely the antisemitic chauvinist often associated with his image, he engaged with Nazi powers who he thought would promote his music and became embittered when the Nazis found the "elitist old master's often morose music" to be "little propaganda-worthy." The most comprehensive English-language account of Pfitzner's relations with the Nazis is by Michael Kater.

== Musical style and reception ==
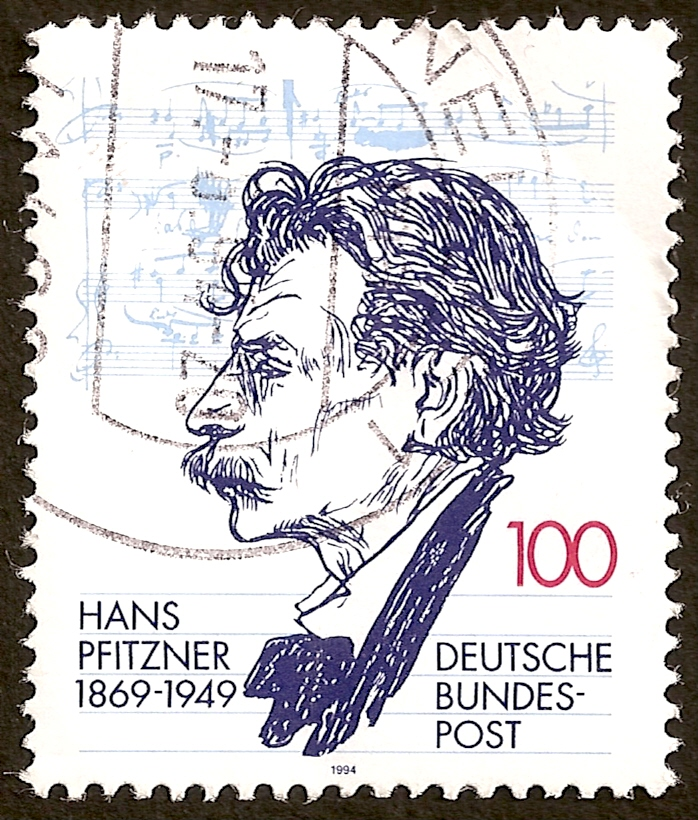
Hans Pfitzner featured on a 1994 German postage stamp

Pfitzner's music—including pieces all the major genres except the symphonic poem—was respected by contemporaries such as Gustav Mahler and Richard Strauss, although neither man cared much for Pfitzner's innately acerbic manner (and Alma Mahler repaid his adoration with contempt, despite her agreement with his intuitive musical idealism, a fact evident in her letters to the wife of Alban Berg). Although Pfitzner's music betrays Wagnerian influences, the composer was not attracted to Bayreuth, and was personally despised by Cosima Wagner, in part because Pfitzner sought notice and recognition from such "anti-Wagnerian" composers as Max Bruch and Johannes Brahms.

Pfitzner's works combine Romantic and Late Romantic elements with extended thematic development, atmospheric music drama, and the intimacy of chamber music. Columbia University musicologist Walter Frisch has described Pfitzner as a "regressive modernist." His is a highly personal offshoot of the Classical/Romantic tradition as well as the conservative musical aesthetic and Pfitzner defended his style in his own writings. Particularly notable are Pfitzner's numerous and delicate lieder, influenced by Hugo Wolf, yet with their own rather melancholy charm. Several of them were recorded during the 1930s by the distinguished baritone Gerhard Hüsch, with the composer at the piano. His first symphony—the Symphony in C♯ minor—underwent a strange genesis: it was not conceived in orchestral terms at all, but was a reworking of a string quartet. The works betray a late pious inspiration and although they take on a late Romantic qualities, they show others associated with the brooding unwieldiness of a modern idiom. For example, composer Arthur Honegger writes in 1955, after criticizing too much polyphony and overly long orchestral writing in a long essay devoted to Palestrina,

Musically, the work shows a superior design, which demands respect. The themes are clearly formed, which makes it easy to follow...

Pfitzner's work was appreciated by contemporaries including Richard Strauss and Gustav Mahler, who explicitly described Pfitzner's first string quartet (in D-Major) of 1902/03 as a masterpiece. Thomas Mann praised Palestrina in a short essay published in October 1917. He co-founded the Hans Pfitzner Association for German Music in 1918. Tensions with Mann, however, developed and the two severed relations by 1926.

From the mid-1920s, Pfitzner's music increasingly fell in the shadow of Richard Strauss. His opera, Das Herz of 1932, was unsuccessful. Pfitzner remained a peripheral figure in the musical life of Nazi Germany, and his music was performed less frequently than in the late days of the Weimar Republic.

German critic Hans Heinz Stuckenschmidt, writing in 1969, viewed Pfitzner's music with extreme ambivalence: initiated with sharp dissonances and hard linear counterpoint determined to be taken as (and criticized for being) modernist. This became a conservative rebellion against all modernist conformity. Composer Wolfgang Rihm commented on the increasing popularity of Pfitzner's work in 1981:

Pfitzner is too progressive, not simply, the way Korngold can be taken to be; he is also too conservative, if that means to be influenced by someone like Schoenberg. All this has audible consequences. We cannot find the brokenness of today in his work at first glance, but neither the unbroken yesterday. We find both, that is, none, and all attempts at classification falter.

== Students of Hans Pfitzner ==
- Sem Dresden (1881–1957)
- Ture Rangström (1884–1947)
- Otto Klemperer (1885–1973)
- W. H. Hewlett (1873–1940)
- Heinrich Jacoby (1889–1964)
- Czesław Marek (1891–1985)
- Charles Münch (1891–1967)
- Felix Wolfes (1892–1971)
- Carl Orff (1895–1982)
- Heinrich Sutermeister (1910–1995)

== Recordings ==
His complete orchestral works have been recorded by the German conductor Werner Andreas Albert. His complete songs have been recorded on the CPO label. Also, his chamber music, including 4 string quartets, 2 piano trios, a violin sonata, a couple of odd piano works, a piano quintet and a string sextet, and a cello sonata have been recorded several times.

== Works ==
=== Operas ===
| Title | Subtitle | Opus | Librettist | Year | Premiere | Notes |
|---|---|---|---|---|---|---|
| Der arme Heinrich | Music Drama in 3 acts | WoO 15 | James Grun (1868–1928) after Hartmann von Aue | 1891–1893 | 1895, Mainz | Richard Bruno Heydrich sang in the premiere |
| Die Rose vom Liebesgarten | Romantic Opera with a Prelude, two acts, and postlude | WoO 16 | James Grun | 1897–1900 | 1901, Elberfeld | |
| Das Christ-Elflein (1st version) | Christmas Tale | Op. 20 | Ilse von Stach | 1906 | 1906, Munich | |
| Das Christ-Elflein (2nd version) | Spieloper in 2 acts | Op. 20 | Ilse von Stach and Pfitzner | 1917 | 1917, Dresden | Further unpublished revision in 1944 |
| Palestrina | Musical Legend in 3 acts | WoO 17 | Pfitzner | 1909–1915 | 1917, Munich | The composer's most famous work |
| Das Herz | Drama for Music in 3 acts (4 scenes) | Op. 39 | Hans Mahner-Mons (1883–1956) | 1930–31 | 1931, Berlin and Munich | |

=== Orchestral works ===
| Work | Opus | Year | Notes |
|---|---|---|---|
| Scherzo in C minor | – | 1887 | |
| Cello Concerto in A minor | Op. Post. | 1888 | for Esther Nyffenegger |
| Incidental music to Henrik Ibsen's play Das Fest auf Solhaug | – | 1890 | |
| Herr Oluf | Op. 12 | 1891 | ballad for baritone and orchestra |
| Die Heinzelmännchen | Op. 14 | 1902–03 | ballad for bass and orchestra |
| Das Käthchen von Heilbronn | Op. 17 | 1905 | incidental music |
| Piano Concerto in E♭ major | Op. 31 | 1922 | for Walter Gieseking |
| Violin Concerto in B minor | Op. 34 | 1923 | for Alma Moodie |
| Lethe | Op. 37 | 1926 | for baritone und orchestra |
| Symphony in C♯ minor | Op. 36a | 1932 | Adapted from String Quartet, Op. 36 |
| Cello Concerto in G major | Op. 42 | 1935 | for Gaspar Cassadó |
| Duo for Violin, Cello, and small Orchestra | Op. 43 | 1937 | |
| Small Symphony in G major | Op. 44 | 1939 | |
| Elegy and Roundelay | Op. 45 | 1940 | |
| Symphony in C major | Op. 46 | 1940 | "An die Freunde" |
| Cello Concerto in A minor | Op. 52 | 1944 | for Ludwig Hoelscher |
| Cracow Greetings | Op. 54 | 1944 | |
| Fantasie in A minor | Op. 56 | 1947 | |

=== Chamber works ===
| Title | Opus | Year | Notes |
|---|---|---|---|
| Piano Trio in B♭ major | – | 1886 | completed by Gerhard Frommel |
| String Quartet [No 1.] in D minor | – | 1886 | |
| Sonata in F♯ minor (Cello and piano) | Op. 1 | 1890 | „Das Lied soll schauern und beben…“ |
| Piano Trio in F major | Op. 8 | 1890–96 | |
| String Quartet [No. 2] in D major | Op. 13 | 1902–03 | |
| Piano Quintet in C major | Op. 23 | 1908 | |
| Sonata in E minor for Violin and Piano | Op. 27 | 1918 | |
| String Quartet [No. 3] in C♯ minor | Op. 36 | 1925 | |
| String Quartet [No. 4] in C minor | Op. 50 | 1942 | |
| Unorthographic Fugato | – | 1943 | for String Quartet |
| Sextet in G minor | Op. 55 | 1945 | for clarinet, violin, viola, cello, contrabass, and piano |

=== Instrumental works ===
| Title | Opus | Year | Notes |
|---|---|---|---|
| 5 Piano Pieces | Op. 47 | 1941 | |
| 6 Studien | Op. 51 | 1942 | for piano |

=== Choral works ===
| Title | Opus | Year | Notes |
|---|---|---|---|
| Der Blumen Rache | – | 1888 | ballade for women's chorus, alto & orchestra (after Ferdinand Freiligrath) |
| Du altes Jahr. Rundgesang zum Neujahrsfest 1901 | – | 1900 | for bass, mixed or male chorus and piano |
| Columbus | Op. 16 | 1905 | for mixed chorus |
| Gesang der Barden | – | 1906 | for male chorus and orchestra |
| Two German Songs | Op. 25 | 1915–16 | for baritone, male chorus ad. lib. and orchestra |
| Von Deutscher Seele | Op. 28 | 1921 | for four soloists, mixed choir, orchestra & organ |
| Das dunkle Reich | Op. 38 | 1929 | choral fantasy with soprano, baritone, orchestra & organ |
| Fons Salutifer | Op. 48 | 1941 | hymn for mixed choir, orchestra & organ |
| Two Male Choruses | Op. 49 | 1941 | |
| Three Songs | Op. 53 | 1944 | for male chorus and chamber orchestra |
| Urworte. Orphisch | Op. 57 | 1948–49 | cantata for four soloists, mixed chorus, orchestra and organ, completed by Robert Rehan |

=== Songs with piano accompaniment ===
| Opus | Title | Year | Text | Notes |
|---|---|---|---|---|
| – | Six Early Songs | 1884–87 | Julius Sturm, Mary Graf-Bartholomew, Ludwig Uhland, Oskar von Redwitz, Eduard Mörike, Robert Reinick | |
| 2 | Seven Songs | 1888–89 | Richard von Volkmann, Hermann Lingg, Aldof Böttger, Alexander Kaufmann, anon. | No. 2, 5, 6, 7 orchestrated |
| 3 | Three Songs | 1888–89 | Friedrich Rückert, Friedrich von Sallet, Emanuel Geibel | Medium voice. No. 2, 3 orchestrated. |
| 4 | Four Songs | 1888–89 | Heinrich Heine | medium voice. Also orchestrated |
| 5 | Three Songs | 1888–89 | Joseph von Eichendorff | for Soprano. No. 1 Orchestrated |
| 6 | Six Songs | 1888–89 | Heine, Grun, Paul Nikolaus Cossmann | for High Baritone |
| 7 | Five Songs | 1888–1900 | Wolfgang von Königswinter, Eichendorff, Paul Heyse, Grun | No. 3 Orchestrated |
| 9 | Five Songs | 1894–95 | Eichendorff | |
| 10 | Three Songs | 1889–1901 | Detlev von Lilencron, Eichendorff | for Medium Voice |
| 11 | Five Songs | 1901 | Friedrich Hebbel, Ludwig Jacobowski, Eichendorff, Richard Dehmel, Carl Hermann Busse | No. 4, 5 orchestrated |
| – | Untreu und Trost | 1903 | Anon | for medium voice. Also orchestrated. |
| 15 | Four Songs | 1904 | Busse, Eichendorff, von Stach | No. 2, 3, 4 orchestrated |
| 18 | An den Mond | 1906 | Goethe | Longer song (ca. 8 min.). Also orchestrated |
| 19 | Two Songs | 1905 | Busse | |
| 21 | Two Songs | 1907 | Hebbel, Eichendorff | for high voice |
| 22 | Five Songs | 1907 | Eichendorff, Adelbert von Chamisso, Gottfried August Bürger | |
| 24 | Four Songs | 1909 | Walther von der Vogelweide, Petrarch (trans. Karl August Förster), Friedrich Lienhard | No. 1 orchestrated |
| 26 | Five Songs | 1916 | Friedrich Hebbel, Eichendorff, Gottfried August Bürger, Goethe | No 2, 4 orchestrated |
| 29 | Four Songs | 1921 | Hölderlin, Rückert, Goethe, Dehmel | dedicated to his family No. 3 orchestrated |
| 30 | Four Songs | 1922 | Nikolaus Lenau, Mörike, Dehmel | |
| 32 | Four Songs | 1923 | Conrad Ferdinand Meyer | for baritone or bass |
| 33 | Alte Weisen | 1923 | Gottfried Keller | |
| 35 | Six Liebeslieder | 1924 | Ricarda Huch | for female voice |
| 40 | Six Songs | 1931 | Ludwig Jacobowski, Adolf Bartels, Ricarda Huch, Martin Greif, Goethe, Eichendorff | No. 5, 6 orchestrated |
| 41 | Three Sonnets | 1931 | Petrarch (trans. Bürger), Eichendorff | Male voice |
