= Ottilie Metzger =

German opera singer

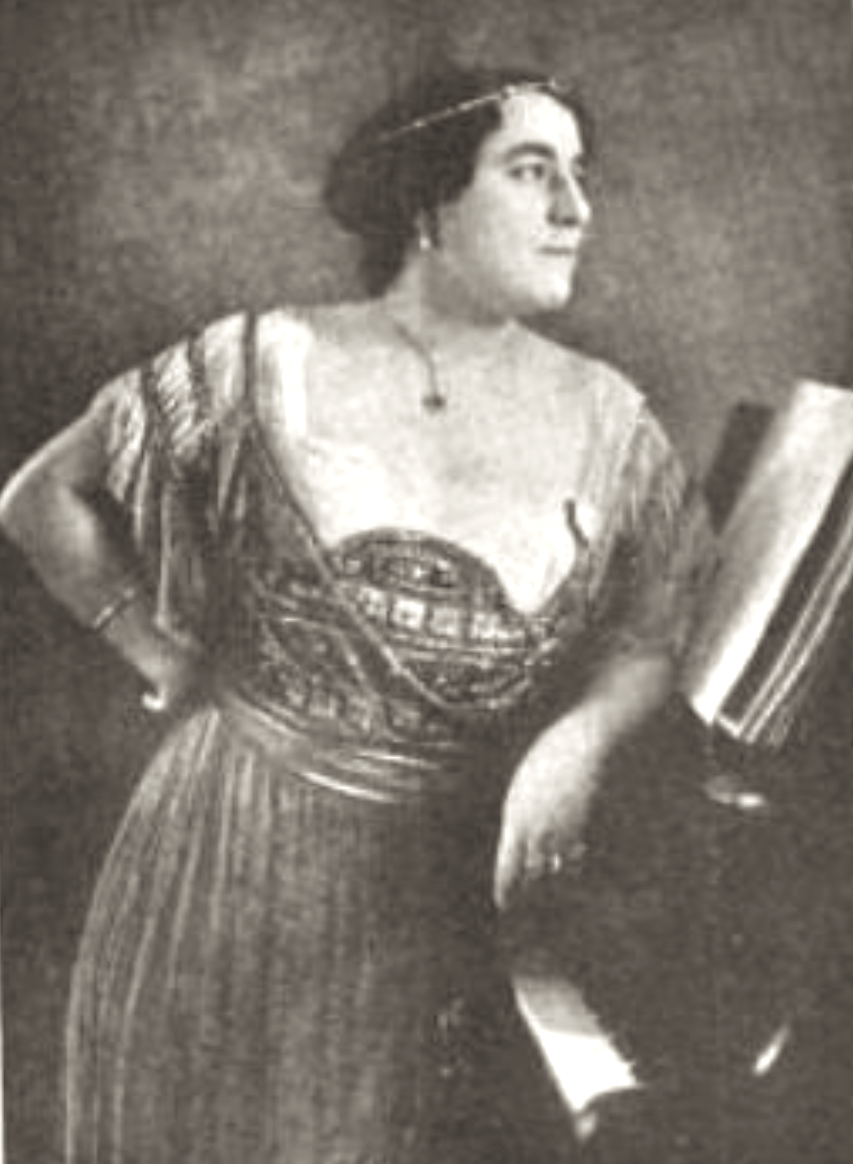
- 1915 image of Ottilie Metzger from The Musical Courier.
- Born: 15 July 1878; Frankfurt
- Died: February 1943 (aged 64); Auschwitz
- Occupation(s): Contralto singer, voice teacher

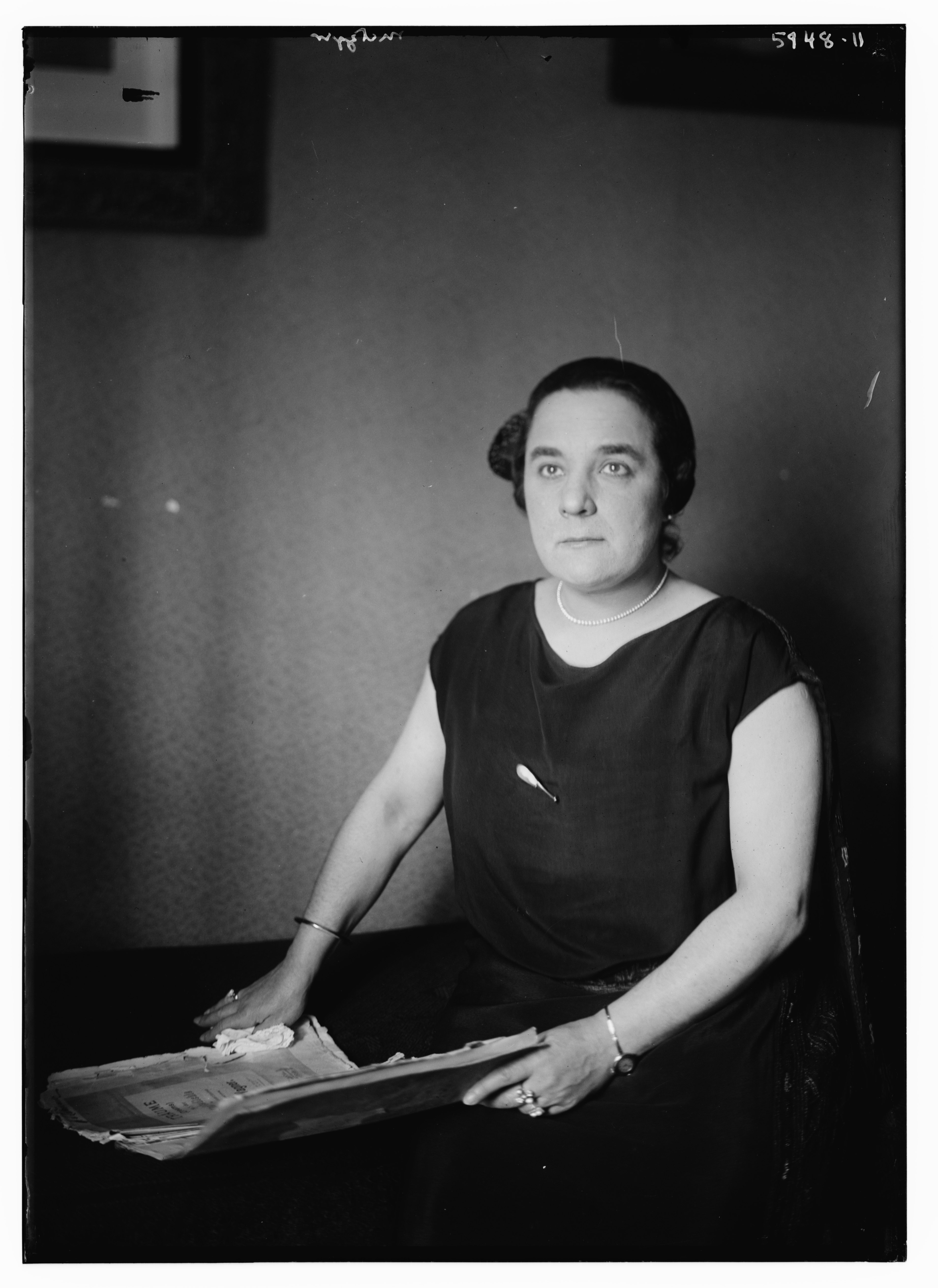
Ottilie Metzger, from the Library of Congress

Ottilie Metzger, also known by her married names Ottilie Metzger-Froitzheim and Ottilie Metzger-Lattermann, (15 July 1878 – c. February 1943) was a German contralto who had an active international career in operas, oratorios, and concerts from 1898 until her retirement from the stage in 1925. She sang a wide repertoire that encompasses German, French, and Italian opera. She was celebrated for her portrayal of the title heroine in Georges Bizet's Carmen, and for her performances in the operas of Richard Wagner and Richard Strauss. She was active as a voice teacher in Berlin at the Stern Conservatory, her alma mater, until the rise of Nazi Germany in the 1930s. Due to her Jewish heritage, she fled to Brussels in 1939 and remained there until 1942 when she was arrested during the German occupation of Belgium during World War II. A victim of the Holocaust, She was interned in Auschwitz and sentenced to death in October 1942. While the exact date and circumstances of her death are unknown, there is some speculation that her death may have occurred in or near February 1943.

== Early life and education ==
Ottile Metzger was born in Frankfurt, Germany on 15 July 1878. Her parents, Ludwig Richard Metzger and Rosalie "Rosa” Metzger, were Jewish. The Metzger family lived in Frankfurt during Ottile's early childhood, and she attended schools in that city. In c. 1892/1893 the family moved to Berlin. There, Ottile's father worked for the Berliner Tageblatt as both a journalist and an editor; with records showing he was an editor from 1893 to 1921.

Metzger began serious musical training with Ottilie Hey in 1894, and in 1895 she matriculated to the Stern Conservatory in Berlin. She studied voice with the soprano Selma Nicklass-Kempner; a professor of singing at Stern. She also studied in Berlin with Georg Vogel (singing) and Emanuel Reicher (acting).

== Early career: 1898-1915 ==
Metzger made her professional opera debut in 1898 at the Halle Opera House. She was a resident principal artist at the Cologne Opera from 1900-1903. In 1902 she married the author Clemens Froitzheim, and they divorced six years later in 1908. She sometimes used her married name Ottilie Metzger-Froitzheim professionally, but also made records and appeared on the stage under her maiden name Ottilie Metzger during these years. In 1910 she married the baritone Theodor Lattermann (1880-1926), after which she would occasionally use the name Ottilie Metzger-Latterman professionally. However, she still also used her maiden name, Ottilie Metzger, during her second marriage on recordings and on the stage.

Metzger was the leading resident contralto at the Hamburg State Opera (HSO) from 1903-1915. With the latter company she became a great star of the opera stage. At the HSO, at the HSO she portrayed leading parts in the world premieres of Siegfried Wagner’s Bruder Lustig (1905), Leo Blech’s Versiegelt (1908) and Eugen d'Albert’s Izegl (1909). She also starred in the title role of Georges Bizet's Carmen with Enrico Caruso as Don José, and also sang Amneris with Caruso as Radamès in Giuseppe Verdi's Aida.

In 1901 Metzger appeared as a guest artist at the Vienna State Opera and the Berlin State Opera. In 1901, 1904, and 1912 she performed in The Ring Cycle at the Bayreuth Festival; appearing to acclaim in the roles of Erda and Waltraute. In 1902 she made her debut at the Royal Opera House (ROH) in London; appearing that year in productions of Die Meistersinger von Nürnberg, Siegfried, and Tristan und Isolde. She later returned to London in 1910 as Clytemnestra in Richard Strauss's Elektra and as Herodias in the first London staging of Strauss's Salome. She also performed the role of Bizet's Carmen at the ROH.

Other opera houses she performed at as a guest artist while working at the HSO included the Hessisches Staatstheater Wiesbaden (1903), the Bavarian State Opera (1903), the Mariinsky Theatre, the Frankfurt Opera, the Hungarian State Opera, the Prague State Opera, and La Monnaie. In 1910 she was a soloist in Munich premiere of Gustav Mahler's Symphony No. 8. In 1914-1915 she and her husband took an extensive tour of the United States.

== Later career: 1916-1924 ==
In 1916 Metzger became a principal artist the Semperoper in Dresden; remaining in that position through 1921. She also worked as a guest artist during these years in other theaters. In 1916 she performed the role of Brangäne in Tristan und Isolde at the Stadsschouwburg in Amsterdam. In 1917 she was a guest artist at the Zürich Opera and the Stadttheater Bern.

In 1922-1923 Metzger toured the United States as the lead contralto in Leo Blech's German Opera Company. She performed the role of Magdalena in the United States premiere of Wilhelm Kienzl's Der Evangelimann at the Great Northern Theatre in Chicago in 1923; a role which she repeated in New York City in 1924. She also performed in the United States premiere of Eugen d'Albert's Die toten Augen in 1924.

== Career as a voice teacher and later life: 1925-c.1942 ==
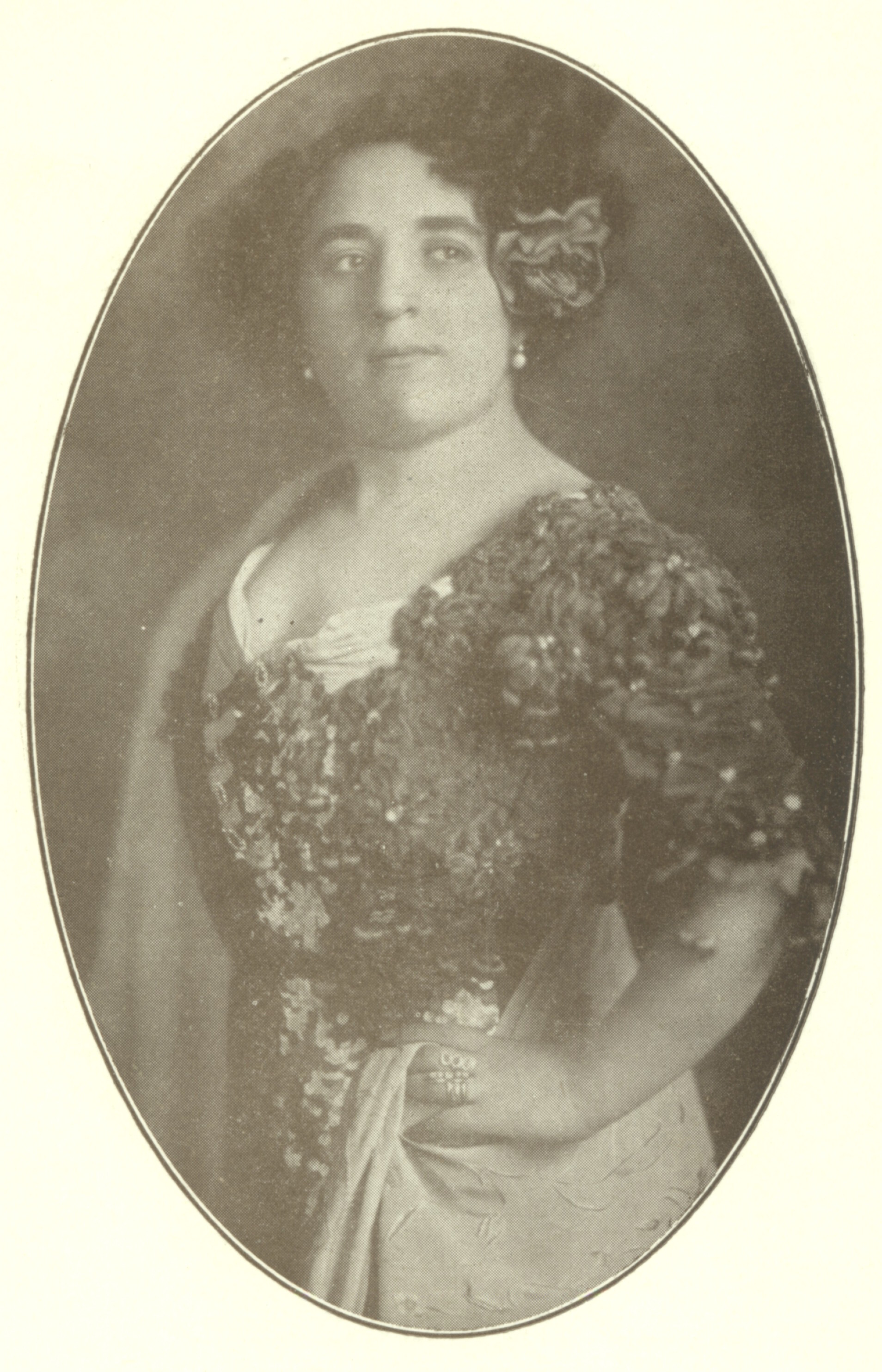
Ottilie Metzger-Lattermann

Metzger mainly retired from the opera stage in 1925 when her husband Theodor became seriously ill. He died in March 1926 at the age of 40. Thereafter, Metzger only performed periodically in concerts and as a guest artist in operas; mainly devoting her time working as a voice teacher. In 1927 she joined the voice faculty at her alma mater, the Stern Conservatory.

Metzger continued to perform as a Lieder recitalist, often accompanied by Richard Strauss and Hans Pfitzner. She gave her last concerts in 1933 under Bruno Walter in Berlin and Otto Klemperer in Dresden, with the seizure of power by Hitler. In 1933 the Nazi Regime instated a ban on Jewish artists performing in public theaters other than those designated by the Jüdischen Kulturbund (Jewish Cultural Association); and after this Metzger was limited to performing for Jewish audiences. She performed on at least one occasion in a Lieder evening with the baritone Erhard Wechselmann, who was also to perish in Auschwitz.

In 1933, the American theatre impresario George Blumental (a former associate of Oscar Hammerstein I, who in 1917 had tried to set up theatres for American troops in Paris), tried to arrange with Georg Hartmann and Arthur Hirsch to bring over conductor Blech and a troupe of 12 Jewish opera singers to present Wagner's Ring in New York. Hirsch's assistant, Otto Metzger, was Ottilie's brother and Ottilie was on the list. Blumental's plans came to nothing, partly due to the unavailability of Blech, Klemperer, and Walter.

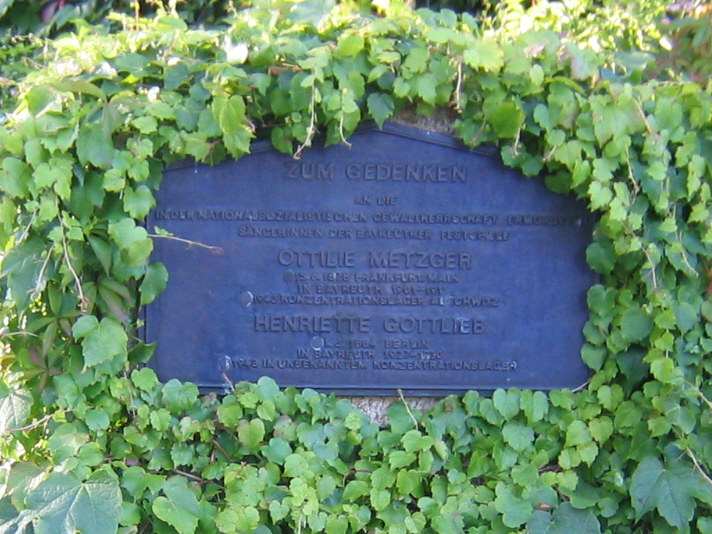
Memorial, Festival Park Bayreuth

Metzger and her daughter, Susanne Lattermann, fled to Brussels in 1939. With the German occupation of Belgium during World War II, Brussels was no longer safe for Metzger and her daughter. Metzger was arrested on 2 October 1942, deported to Auschwitz on 10 October 1942, and arrived at Auschwitz on 12 October 1942 where her processing papers condemned her to death but without specifying how or when she would be killed. She died in Auschwitz sometime after this, with some sources speculating that it occurred sometime around February 1943.

Metzger's daughter Susanne survived the Holocaust. The fact that her father was not Jewish and a Protestant spared her from being sent to a death camp, although her half-Jewish heritage did lead her to be fired from her secretarial job in Brussels and her legal documents marked her as a Jew. In 1947 she emigrated to the United States where she lived for the remainder of her life.

== Bayreuth memorial ==
During the 1970s, a Bayreuth antiquarian bookseller, Peer Baedeker petitioned Winifred Wagner for a plaque to "Richard Breitenfeld, Henriette Gottlieb, Ottilie Metzger-Lattermann – Honoured as festival singers – Murdered in Nazi concentration camps" to be installed at Bayreuth.

== Recordings ==
- Richard Wagner, Siegfried, "Stark ruft das Lied" (1908), Opera Nederland, profile, photo (in Dutch)
