= Erhard Wechselmann =

German opera singer

Erhard Eduard Wechselmann (1895–1943) was a German baritone who was murdered in Auschwitz concentration camp. Wechselmann was born in Eastern-Europe but migrated to The Hague, the Netherlands, where he was chazan in the Synagoge. He was also vocal teacher of Dutch Jiddish singer Lin Jaldati, who wrote also about him in the autobiography she published together with her husband Eberhard Rebling in 1986 in the German Democratic Republic, Sag nie, du gehst den letzten Weg. Dutch translation: Lied van verzet (Song of resistance), 2024. Jaldati, Rebling and Wechselmann also gave a concert together. According to a Dutch source, Wechselmann was murdered in Sobibor.

According to Peter Hugh Reed writing in American Record Guide, 1949, he also sang with the Metropolitan Opera in 1890. Under the Nazi regime, Wechselmann performed for Jewish audiences, on at least one occasion with the contralto Ottilie Metzger-Lattermann who was also to perish in Auschwitz.
