= Yrjö Kilpinen =

Finnish composer (1892–1959)

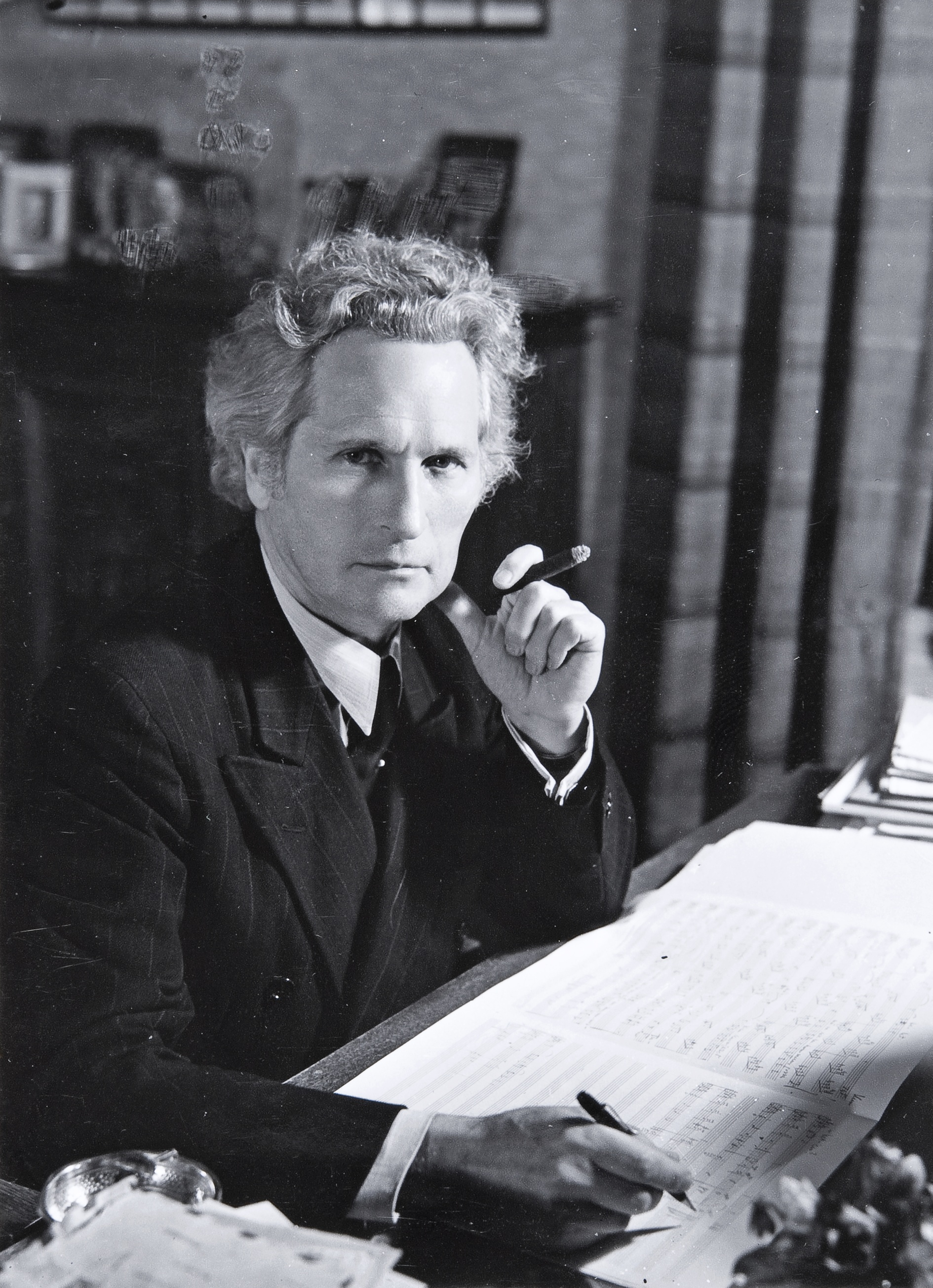
Kilpinen in 1951

Yrjö Henrik Kilpinen (4 February 1892 – 2 March 1959) was a Finnish composer. He was born in Helsinki, and in 1907 he started his studies in the Helsingin Musiikkiopisto (later named Sibelius Academy). In 1910 Kilpinen moved to Vienna to continue his studies and from 1913 to 1914 he studied in Berlin. He travelled extensively in Scandinavia and central Europe, especially Germany. He became an honorary professor in 1942 and was elected to the Finnish Academy in 1948.

Kilpinen is most famous for composing 790 works in the Lieder style. Among his other works were six piano sonatas, a violin sonata and a cello sonata. During the 1930s and 1940s he was internationally the most well-known Finnish composer after Jean Sibelius.

Kilpinen's friendship with the German national-socialistic leaders brought him a bad name after the war, after which he was more or less a "persona non grata" in Finland. Kilpinen remains a controversial figure to this very day despite the continuous popularity of his music — him being a Nazi-sympathiser still casts a dark shadow upon his reputation.

In April 1999, the North American Yrjö Kilpinen Society came into existence. The Sousa Archives and Center for American Music at the University of Illinois at Urbana-Champaign holds the Jeffrey Sandborg Collection of Yrjo Kilpinen Music, 1920–1940, which consists of published scores, manuscripts (originals and facsimiles), newspaper and journal articles, concert programs, photographs, phonograph and reel-to-reel recordings.

== Literature ==
- The Biographical Dictionary of Musicians, p. 234. Blue Ribbon Books, Inc. 1940. (Original © 1903.)
- Karila, Tauno (1964). Yrjö Kilpinen: Säveltäjäkuvan ääriviivoja (in Finnish). Helsinki: WSOY.
- Salmenhaara, Erkki (2005). "Kilpinen, Yrjö (1892–1959)". Suomen kansallisbiografia (in Finnish). Vol. 5. Helsinki: Suomalaisen Kirjallisuuden Seura. pp. 165–167. ISBN 951-746-446-0. ISSN 1456-2138.
- Waldén-Antikainen, Susanna (2026). Kansallissosialismi Yrjö Kilpisen ja Gerhard Hüschin musiikkitoiminnassa: Lehdistö, konsertointi ja menneisyydenhallinta [National Socialism in the musical work of Yrjö Kilpinen and Gerhard Hüsch: Press, concerts, and dealing with the past] (Ph.D. thesis). Studia musicologica Universitatis Helsingiensis, 32 (in Finnish). Helsinki: University of Helsinki. ISBN 978-952-84-2364-5. ISSN 0787-4294.
