= Michael Leuschner =

German classical pianist and professor of piano (born 1948)

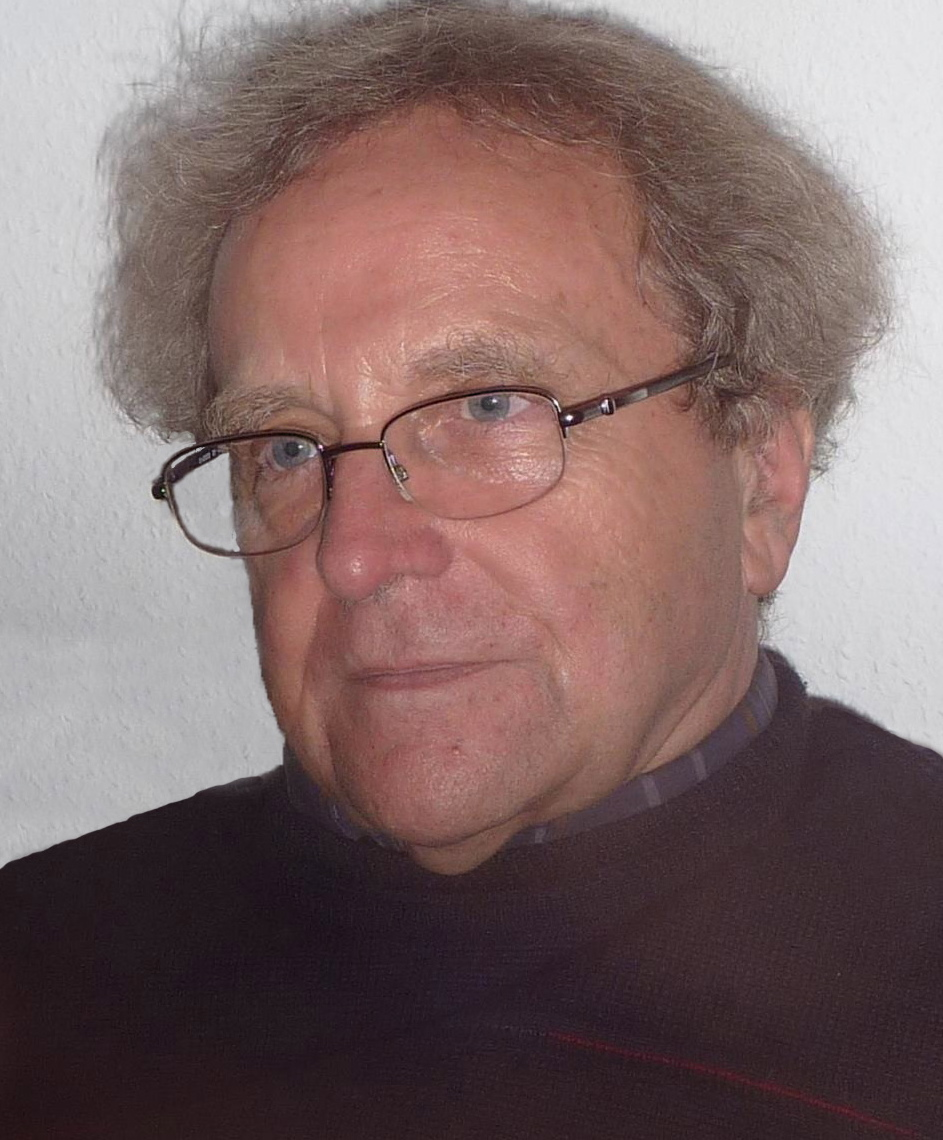
Michael Leuschner

Michael Leuschner (born 29 April 1948 in Wernigerode, Germany - 15 October 2023 in Freiburg, Germany) was a German classical pianist and professor of piano at the University of Music (Hochschule für Musik) Freiburg im Breisgau, Germany.

== Life and work ==
Michael Leuschner was born on 29 April 1948 in Wernigerode (Germany). His father Prof. Dr. Joachim Leuschner was professor of history, his mother Helga was interpreter. He grew up in Göttingen and there his first piano teachers were Meta Conrad and Martin Galling. After his Abitur he first studied musicology and German literature in Göttingen before beginning his piano studies at the University of Music (Hochschule für Musik) in Freiburg i. Br. under Edith Picht-Axenfeld, Helmut Barth (Chambermusic) and Carl Seemann. A scholarship enabled him to continue his studies in London with Bernard Roberts and in Positano (Italy) with Wilhelm Kempff. He also took part actively in a Schubert-masterclass with Alfred Brendel. He was prizewinner in several competitions.

From 1970 until 1974 Michael Leuschner gave concerts as a member of the Freiburg Ensemble for Contemporary Music and later he continued his career as a soloist giving recitals and chamber music performances in many European countries, Asia, Australia, South America and in the United States. His extensive repertoire includes many of the major works of Bach, Beethoven, Schubert, Chopin, Schumann and Debussy. He has recorded and performed in several cities the complete cycle of the 32 Beethoven sonatas.

Not only as a solo pianist Michael Leuschner has also devoted much time as a chamber musician, having played the majority of chamber music works for violin, cello and wind instruments from Brahms, Beethoven, Schumann and Schubert. He frequently performs chambermusic, together with, and as a member of the Dreisam Trio, established in 1994.

Michael Leuschner was professor at the Hochschule für Musik and Theater in Hannover from 1984 to 1989 and is now professor of piano at the University of Music (Hochschule für Musik) in Freiburg i. Br. Many of his students have continued on into successful careers as performers and teachers, several winning first prizes in international and national piano competitions. For many years until 2011 he was head of the Keyboard Department. He was artist in residence at the ((University of Western Australia)) in Perth and has given regular masterclasses in Australia, and also in Indonesia, Thailand, China, Japan, the USA, Russia and the Ukraine.

Well over a hundred radio recordings for nearly all German stations, as well as in Switzerland, England (BBC), Australia (ABC and other broadcasting stations) document his interpretations.

CD recordings have been published in the USA (Brioso) with works of Clementi, Germany (abadone) with works of Bach, Mozart, Chopin, Schumann, Schubert, Debussy, Switzerland with works for piano 4-hands of Schubert, and Japan (ACJ) including works of Haendel, Beethoven, Chopin and Brahms. He can also be seen on YouTube in live performances as well as in the photo and picture videos of Meinolf Wewel

Leuschner has been chairman of the Denzlinger Kulturkreis for more than 20 years and organizer of a highly successful concert series in Denzlingen. In 2003 he was honoured with the 1st Denzlingen prize for cultural engagement.
