= Five Songs, Op. 7 (Pfitzner) =

Song cycle by Hans Pfitzner

Five Songs
- by Hans Pfitzner
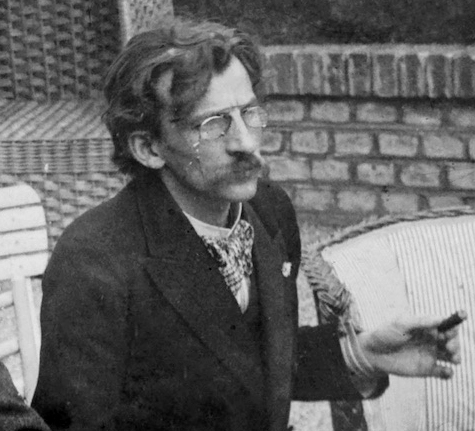
- Hans Pfitzner in 1905
- Opus: 7
- Movements: 5
- Scoring: Voice and piano

Five Songs, Op. 7 (German: Fünf Lieder für Singstimme mit Pianoforte) is a song cycle by German composer Hans Pfitzner. The fifth in his extensive song cycle output, it was written between 1888 and 1900.

== Background ==
Five Songs, Op. 7, forms part of Pfitzner’s early compositions for voice and piano. It was dedicated to Max Steinitzer (1864–1936). Individual songs from the set were written over an extended period: "Wie Frühlingsahnung weht es durch die Lande" (No. 5), dates from 1888–89 and was composed while Pfitzner was studying at the Hoch Conservatory in Frankfurt, while "Lockung" (No. 4), was written between 1897 and 1900. The cycle sets contemporary poetry: two songs, nos. 2 and 4, set poems by Joseph von Eichendorff; one song, no. 3, sets a poem by Paul Heyse, taken from his published poems; another song uses a text by Wolfgang Müller von Königswinter (no. 1); the final song sets a poem by James Grun, a friend of Pfitzner's. The collection was published by Ries & Erler in 2002 and, later, by Schott Music.

== Structure ==
The song cycle consists of five songs for voice and piano. The movements are as follows:

1. "Hast du von den Fischerkindern das alte Märchen vernommen?"
2. "Nachtwanderer"
3. "Über ein Stündlein"
4. "Lockung"
5. "Wie Frühlingsahnung weht es durch die Lande"
