= Peter Wackernagel =

German musicologist and librarian

Peter Wackernagel (26 July 1897 – 17 May 1981) was a German musicologist and librarian

== Life ==
Wackernagel was born in Breslau as the son of the priest Paul Wackernagel. He studied history, German language and literature and philosophy in Breslau and received his doctorate in 1921. He passed the examination for a teaching profession for secondary schools. He worked as a volunteer at the Universitätsbibliothek Breslau and trained himself as an autodidact in musicology by attending appropriate seminars. He was also a student of Max Schneider. His piano playing was perfected through private lessons. In 1924, in accordance with his abilities and recommendations by his library director, he accepted an offer from Wilhelm Altmann to move to Berlin to take up a position in the music department of the Staatsbibliothek Berlin. He became responsible for the manuscripts department. Furthermore, he became music consultant at the Deutsche Tageszeitung. He is the author of various music analyses for the concerts of the Berliner Philharmoniker, facsimile and music editions, book publications and essays.

From 1 April 1928, he was a library councillor, and after the death of Georg Schünemann on 2 January 1945, he was made head of the music department, which he held until 31 August 1950.

Wackernagel died in Berlin at the age of 83.

== Work ==
=== Book publications ===
- Johann Sebastian Bach, Brandenburgische Konzerte: Einführungen, (1938), - 31 S,
- Berliner Rundfunk / Magistrat von Gross-Berlin, Abt. für Volksbildung: 16 March – 13 April 1947, Berliner Bahms-Fest on the occasion of the 50th anniversary of Johannes Brahms' death on 3 April 1947: 12 symphony and chamber concerts [Introduction by P.W.], Berlin, (1947),
- 70 Jahre Berliner Philharmonisches Orchester; [preface by] Joachim Iiburtius. - Berlin.
- Wilhelm Furtwängler: Die Programme d. Konzerte mit d. Berliner Philharmonischen Orchester 1922–1954. Zsgest. von P.W. - Wiesbaden, (1958). - 48 p.
- Die Ära Nikisch. Vortrag. - Berlin, (1968), - 15 p. (Annual Edition of the Society of Friends of the Berliner Philharmonie 1968),
- Die Ära Furtwangler: Lecture held on the occasion of the 85th birthday of the conductor. Berlin (1971), - 18 p. (Annual Edition of the Society of the Berlin Philharmonic Orchestra 1971)

=== Articles in journals and collective works ===
- 25 Jahre Deutsche Musiksammlung, in the Deutsche Tageszeitung, 30 March 1931
- Textkritisches zu Guido von Arezzo, in Kritische Beiträge zur Geschichte des Mittelalters. Festschrift für Robert Holtzmann zum 60. Geburtstag. - Berlin (1933), pp. 54–63.
- Die Musikhandschriften der Staatsbibliothek, in Atlantis Jg. 6 (1934), pp. 657–664 with 11 facsimiles of autographs of Bach, Haydn, Mozart, Beethoven, Schubert and Schumann
- Tönende Schriften. Schätze der Musikabteilung an der Preußischen Staatsbibliothek, in Deutsche Allgemeine Zeitung, 4 August 1941,
- Johannes Wolf zum Gedächtnis. Ansprache vor d. Arbeitskollegen d. Öff. Wiss. Bibl. am 3. Juli 1947, in ZfB 61 (1947), pp. 205–207.
- Handschriften Chopins, in Chopin-Almanach: 100. Wiederkehr des Todesjahres von Fryderyk Chopin. Ed. by the Chopin Committee in Germany. - Potsdam, (1949), pp. 125–133.
- Eine kostbare Handschriftensammlung (Besprechung des Kataloges über die Musikautographen-Sammlung Louis Koch), in Musica 8 (1954), pp. 308–209.
- Beobachtungen am Autograph von Bachs Brandenburgischen Konzerten, in Festschrift Max Schneider zum 80. Geburtstag: In Verb. mit ... edited by Walter Vetter, Leipzig (1955), pp. 129–145.
- Wilhelm Furtwängler und das Berliner Orchester, in: Wilhelm Furtwängler im Urteil seiner Zeit, Zürich (1955), pp. 179–194.
- Aus glücklichen Zeiten der Preußischen Staatsbibliothek. Erinnerungen an Kollegen und Freunde von einst, in Festschrift für Friedrich Smend zum 70. Geburtstag, dargebracht von Freunden und Schülern.- Berlin (1963), pp. 61–65
- Rückschau auf denkwürdige Aufführungen aus vergangener Zeit, in Singakademie zu Berlin: Festschrift zum 175jährigen Bestehen. Edited by werner Bollert. - Berlin (1966), pp. 29–31.
- Wilhelm Furtwängler, Wesen und Wirken, in Philharmonische Blätter (1974/75) issue. 2, pp. 4–7.

=== Facsimile editions ===
- Bach, Johann Sebastian: Fantasia super Komm heiliger Geist. F. Orgel (BWV 651). Faksimileausg. Words by P. W. ed. on the occasion of the 100th anniversary of the Ed. Merseburger, Leipzig, 21. September 1949, 8 Bl.; u. zum Bach-Jahr 1950. - Berlin (1950)
- Bach, Johann Sebastian: Brandenburgische Konzerte (f. Orch.) (BWV 1046-51). Faks. nach dem ... Autograph (together with text from P. W.) Part.-Leipzig: Peters (1950), 85 Bl., 8 p.

=== Publications ===
- Bach, Johann Sebastian: Neues Bach-Buch. 15 leichte Klavierstücke ausgewählt u. eingeleitet von P. W., London, Bonn: Boosey & Hawkes (1952), 31 p.
- Mozart, W. A.: A Musical Joke. <Dorfmusikanten-Sextett>(KV 522), Neu rev. Ausg. von P. W., Berlin-Lichterfelde: Lienau (1952), 40 p.- + 6 St.
- Weber, Carl Maria v. : Trio for fl., cel. and piano (JV 259) op. 63. According to the original edition. rev. by P.W. Part. u. St., Berlin-Lichterfelde: Lienau (1953), 21 p. + 3 St. (Ausgewählte Kammermusik)
