= Klaus Simon =

German classical pianist and conductor

Klaus Simon is a German classical pianist and conductor.

== Biography and career ==
Klaus Simon was born in Überlingen am Bodensee, Germany, and studied music, German and geography at Albert-Ludwigs-Universität in Freiburg. He studied piano with Michael Leuschner at the Freiburg Musikhochschule, and later studied in master classes with Aloys Kontarsky, for piano, and Hans Zender und Johannes Kalitzke for conducting.

Simon founded the Holst Sinfonietta and the Young Opera Company, and is music director for both of these groups. He is especially interested in 20th-century music, and, as accompanist, he initiated and led a series of lieder recitals featuring music by composers such as Arnold Schoenberg, Hans Pfitzner, Erich Wolfgang Korngold, Wolfgang Rihm, Paul Hindemith, Frank Bridge, Gustav Holst, Rebecca Clarke, George Crumb and Dominick Argento.

Simon has recorded several CDs for the Naxos label, and is slated to record the complete songs of Pfitzner and Korngold. He has also recorded works by John Adams and, for the cpo label, Korngold's last stage work, Die Stumme Serenade. Simon has also edited editions of works by Gustav Mahler and Schoenberg for Universal Edition in Vienna. These editions have been used for a number of performances and recordings. One such arrangement is of Mahler's 4th Symphony for soprano and chamber orchestra (2007).
