= Carl Hermann Busse =

German poet (1872–1918)

Carl (Hermann) Busse (12 November 1872 – 3 December 1918) was a German lyric poet. He worked as a literary critic and published his own poetry and prose, occasionally under the pseudonym Fritz Döring.

== Life ==
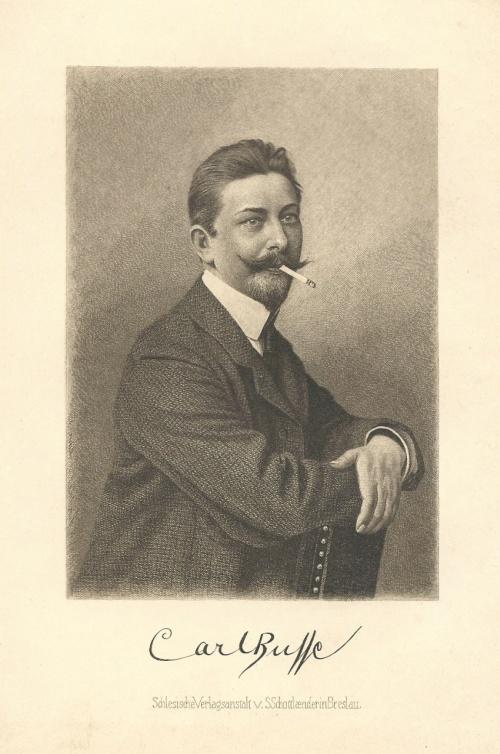
Carl Busse (Fritz Döring). Etching by Johann Lindner

Busse was born in Lindenstadt near Birnbaum (today Międzychód) in the Prussian Province of Posen (Poznań). He received his secondary education in Wągrowiec (German: Wongrowitz). From 1893 he lived in Berlin and received a military education. In 1894 he studied philology, history, and philosophy at the Humboldt University of Berlin and in 1898 earned a doctorate from the University of Rostock where he wrote a thesis on the poetry of Novalis advised by Wolfgang Golthier. Upon graduation, he was active as a freelance author and literary critic in Berlin. He was an associate editor of the Deutschen Wochenblatt, a journal for politics, art, and literature, and contributed to Leipzig publisher Velhagen & Klasings Monatsheften. Busse was a founding member of the "Cartel of German Lyric Authors".

The composer Heinrich Kaspar Schmid included a setting Busse's poem "Schöne Nacht" in his Op. 9 songs of 1903. The song premiered on 18 June 1903 at the Munich Odeon in a concert of students from the Academy of Music in Munich with the composer at the piano. German composer Luise Schulze-Berghof (1889-1970) also set Busse’s text to music.

Busse belonged to a circle of writers supported by Ludwig Stollwerck, a Cologne chocolate magnate and entrepreneur. They helped design the Stollwerck firm's series of collectable scrapbooks and print albums, "Stollwerck's Sammel-Album". Other writers included poet "T. Resa" (Theresa Gröhe, née Pauli-Greiffenberg), zoology professor Paul Matschie, author Hans Eschelbach, journalist Julius Rodenberg, author Joseph von Lauff, novelist Gustav Falke, and the poet Anna Ritter.

During the World War I in 1916, Busse joined the militia and was decorated with an Iron Cross, Second Class. He died in Berlin, in the 1918 flu pandemic. Busse was buried in the Friedrichswerderscher Friedhof in Berlin's Kreuzberg district.

Busse married Paula Sara Jacobsen and had two daughters, Ute and Christine. In 1924, his widow rented the ground floor of their house at 25-6 Heidestrasse in Berlin's Steglitz district to Dora Diamant and Franz Kafka under the name "Dr. Kaesbohrer". Heidestrasse was named the "Busseallee" in his honor in 1931. In the Nazi period, Paula Busse survived internment at Theresienstadt.

Busse's brother, Georg Busse-Palma, was also a writer.

== Works ==
- Gedichte 1892
- In junger Sonne 1892
- Geschichte einer Jugend 1892
- Jugendstürme 1896
- Jadwiga 1899
- Die Schüler von Polajewo 1901
- Das Gymnasium zu Lengowo 1907 (Roman)
- Geschichte der Weltliteratur zwei Bände, Bielefeld / Leipzig 1909–1912
- Sturmvögel 1917
- Trittchen(aus dem Tagebuch eines Verwundeten)
- Der dankbare Heilige und andere Novellen
- Deutsche Kriegslieder (1914/1915)
- Heilige Not (Ein Gedichtbuch 1910)
- Neue Gedichte (1892–1895)
- Aus verklungenen Stunden (Sketchbook 1919), Jugenderzählungen – collected by Paula Busse
- Träume 1895
- Über Zeit und Dichtung (Aufsätze zur Literatur 1915)
- Vagabunden (Neue Lieder und Gedichte)
- Federspiel (westliche und östliche Geschichten)
- Im polnischen Wind (Ostmärkische Geschichten)
- Flugbeute (Neue Erzählungen)
- Annette von Droste
- Feuerschein (Novellen und Skizzen aus dem Weltkrieg)
- Klar Schiff (Seekriegslieder 1914/1915)

Georg Busse-Palma:

- Lieder eines Zigeuners (1899), with an introduction by Carl Busse
- Zwei Bücher Liebe und andere Gedichte (1903)
