= Gerhard Hüsch =

German baritone (1901–1984)

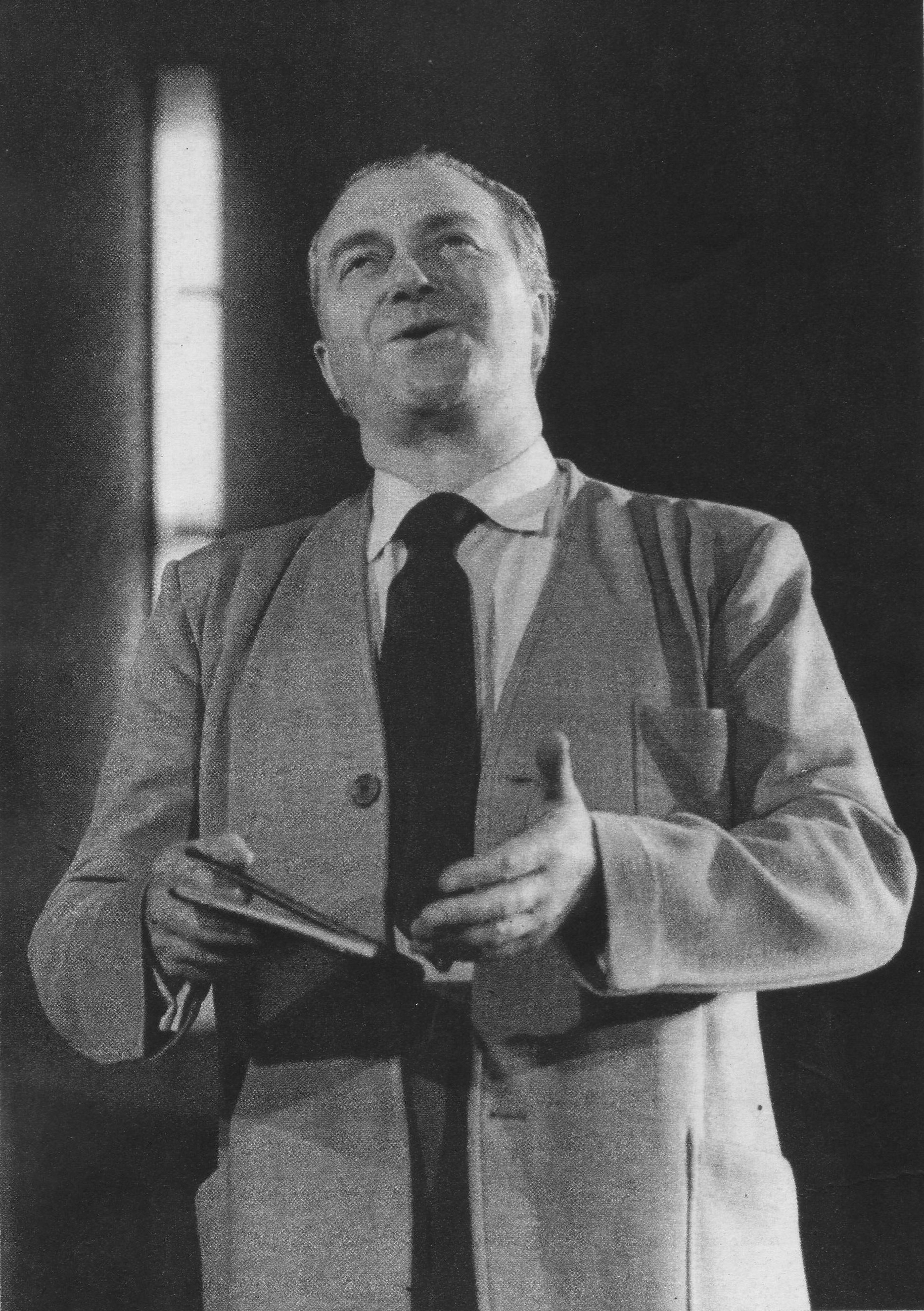
- Hüsch in Japan, 1952
- Born: Gerhard Heinrich Wilhelm Fritz Hüsch; 2 February 1901; Hanover, Lower Saxony, Germany
- Died: 23 November 1984 (aged 83); Munich, Bavaria, Germany
- Occupation: Baritone
- Years active: 1920s–1950s

Gerhard Heinrich Wilhelm Fritz Hüsch (2 February 1901 – 23 November 1984) was one of the most important German singers of modern times. A lyric baritone, he specialized in Lieder but also sang, to a lesser extent, German and Italian opera.

== Career ==
Hüsch was born in Hanover in 1901. He studied acting there as a young man but later took up singing, gaining experience at a series of provincial German theatres, proving to be a brilliant comic actor. Between 1925 and 1944, he was engaged to sing regularly in Berlin (most significantly at the Berlin State Opera) and at several other leading opera venues in Germany and Austria. Such important overseas theatres as the Royal Opera House (Covent Garden, London) and La Scala (Milan) heard him sing during the 1930s, when his international reputation attained its peak.

The operatic role for which he is perhaps best remembered is that of Papageno in Mozart's The Magic Flute. (In 1937–38 he recorded a complete Papageno for His Master's Voice, with Sir Thomas Beecham conducting the Berlin Philharmonic Orchestra.) His stage repertoire, however, included most of the standard roles for the lighter baritone voice, including those of Wagner. Indeed, he was invited to perform at the annual Bayreuth Festival, most famously in 1930 and 1931 as Wolfram in Tannhäuser, under the baton of Arturo Toscanini. The vocal music of Richard Strauss was familiar to him, too, and he took part in the premiere of Strauss's Intermezzo.

Lacking the vocal amplitude of his baritone contemporaries Hans Hotter and Rudolf Bockelmann, Hüsch concentrated instead on investing his singing with a rounded tone and diction in the manner of German lyric-baritone rival, Heinrich Schlusnus, who was 13 years his senior. These vocal qualities were displayed in his pre-war, 78 rpm Lieder records. He performed on disc the uncut versions of Schubert's Winterreise and Die schöne Müllerin song-cycles, and Beethoven's An die ferne Geliebte; his discs of songs by Hugo Wolf, made under Walter Legge's auspices, helped introduce that composer to thousands of music-lovers previously unfamiliar with Wolf's output; and he released a selection of songs by Hans Pfitzner, these recordings bearing the imprimatur of Pfitzner himself at the piano. The Finnish composer Yrjö Kilpinen, found in Hüsch a steadfast champion.

On close listening, recordings show that Hüsch chose to intentionally 'under-sing', never pushing his upper register or inflating his tone beyond the limits of its natural resonance. Sometimes Hüsch performed in choral masterpieces as well. His recorded work in this field including an exceptional Jesus in a wartime set – severely abridged – with Günther Ramin conducting, of Bach's St Matthew Passion.

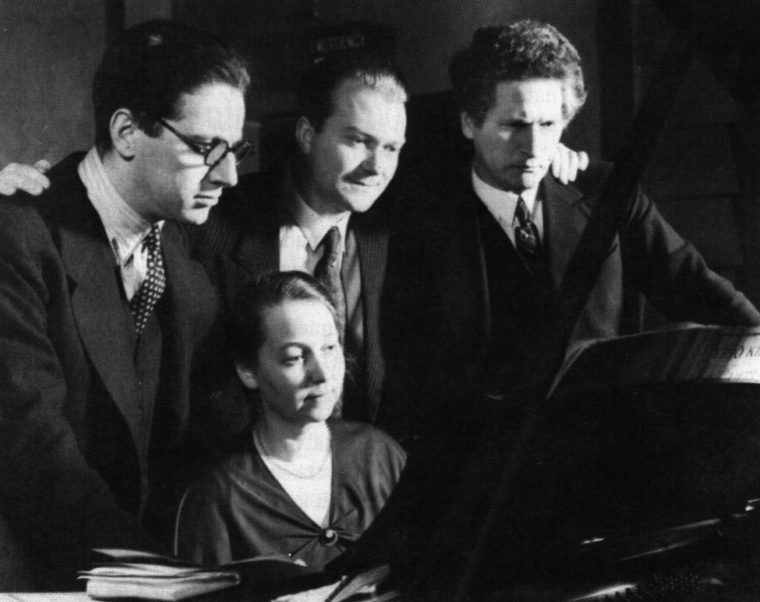
Recording session by Yrjö Kilpinen in London, 1935. Seated at the piano is Margaret Kilpinen (1896–1965); behind her, from left to right, are producer Walter Legge, Hüsch, and Kilpinen.

After World War II, Hüsch, whose political naïveté during the Third Reich (and, in particular, his closeness to Rosalind von Schirach, the sister of prominent Nazi Baldur von Schirach) was unlikely to endear him to the victorious Allies, mostly abandoned concert and operatic appearances, preferring to concentrate on teaching.

A professor at the Munich Hochschule für Musik, he numbered among his pupils the British tenor Nigel Rogers and, notably, James King. He also gave masterclasses in Europe and on a visit to Japan in 1952–53.

From 1977 to 1981, Hüsch taught at the Indiana University School of Music in Bloomington, Indiana, where his private studio was small. He also taught the Master's and Doctoral courses in "song literature". In addition, during his three years in Bloomington, he offered students a seminar in Lieder interpretation for three days each week. Hüsch paired select singers and pianists in specific repertoire from Mozart and Beethoven to Kilpinen and Pfitzner.

Following Bloomington and a few guest masterclasses at the University of Texas at Austin, he accepted a teaching post at the University of Colorado Boulder for the 1982 academic year.

In 1984, at the age of 83, he died in Munich.

Today, most of his large Lieder and operatic discography has been reissued on compact disc by various companies.
