= Salzburg Festival: history and repertoire, 1935–1937 =

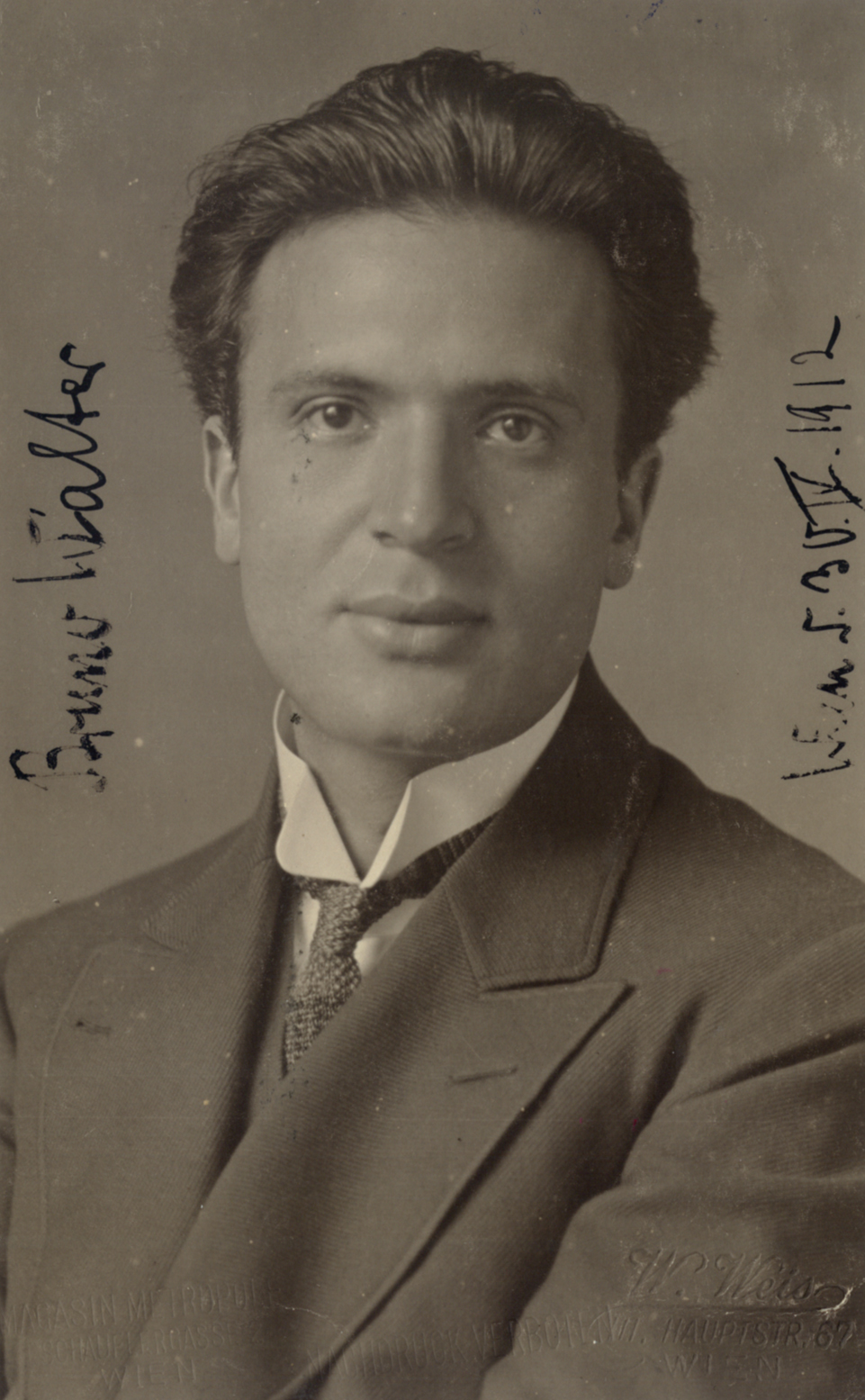
Bruno Walter

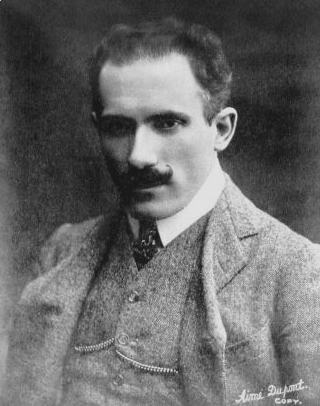
Arturo Toscanini

This is a list of the operas performed by Salzburg Festival during the music directorship of Arturo Toscanini and Bruno Walter (1935–1937). This period was ended by the invasion and annexation of the Republic of Austria by Nazi Germany in March 1938. Arturo Toscanini, an avid opponent of the Nazi regime, thereafter declined to return to Salzburg. Bruno Walter was forced to flee to the United States.

== New opera productions ==
The period 1935 to 1937 was extremely successful for the Salzburg Festival. The percentage of tickets sold rose from 53% in 1934 to 89% in 1937. Each year during this period, Arturo Toscanini presented one new production of an opera suitable to the Salzburg atmosphere. He insisted on major funding and the best available singers. In 1935 he presented Giuseppe Verdi's last opera, Falstaff, performed for the first time at the Salzburg Festival. His choice of Wagner's Meistersinger von Nürnberg in 1936 was seen as an act of opposition to the Bayreuth Festival, insisting that this opera belongs to the cultural heritage of the world and not to Nazi Germany. His last Salzburg premiere was dedicated to the genius loci, Wolfgang Amadeus Mozart, and his masterpiece Die Zauberflöte. Another political statement of Toscanini was that each year he conducted Beethoven's freedom opera Fidelio, a masterpiece against tyranny.

Meanwhile, Bruno Walter, who was the only conductor fully accepted by Toscanini, concentrated on majors works by Mozart, presented a highly acclaimed production of Gluck's Orfeo ed Euridice, and expanded the Salzburg repertory by adding rarely performed operas like Wolf's Der Corregidor and Weber's Euryanthe. He, too, insisted on conducting Wagner in Salzburg – Tristan und Isolde with a splendid cast led by Anny Konetzni and Josef Kalenberg.

=== 1935 ===
Orchestra and Choir Conductor	Director Settings and Costumes	Female Roles	Male Roles
Die Entführung aus dem Serail by Johann Gottlieb Stephanie and Wolfgang Amadeus Mozart, August 12, 21 and 29
Vienna Philharmonic; Choir of Vienna State Opera; Bruno Walter	Herbert Graf; Oscar Strnad Settings	Margherita Perras Konstanze; Margit Bokor/Lotte Schöne Blondchen	Alfred Muzzarelli Bassa Selim; Charles Kullmann Belmonte; William Wernigk Pedrillo; Berthold Sterneck/Ludwig Hofmann Osmin
Falstaff by Arrigo Boito and Giuseppe Verdi, July 29 and August 3, 17 and 26
Vienna Philharmonic; Choir of Vienna State Opera; Arturo Toscanini	Guido Salvini; Robert Kautsky, Ladislaus Czettel; Margarete Wallmann Choreography	Maria Caniglia/Dusolina Giannini Mrs. Alice Ford; Edith Mason Nannetta; Angelica Cravcenco Mrs. Quickly; Mita Vasari Mrs. Meg Page	Mariano Stabile Sir John Falstaff; Piero BiasiniFord; Dino Borgioli Fenton; Angelo Badà Dr. Cajus; Giuseppe Nessi Bardòlfo; Fernando Autori Pistòla

=== 1936 ===
Orfeo ed Euridice by Ranieri de' Calzabigi and Christoph Willibald Gluck, August 1 and 17
Vienna Philharmonic; Choir of Vienna State Opera; Bruno Walter	Margarete Wallmann; Robert Kautsky, Ladislaus Czettel	Kerstin Thorborg Orfeo; Jarmila Novotna Euridice; Margit Bokor Amor; Dora Komar Seliger Geist	
Die Meistersinger von Nürnberg by Richard Wagner, August 8, 14, 18 and 22
Vienna Philharmonic; Choir of Vienna State Opera; Arturo Toscanini	Herbert Graf; Robert Kautsky, Willi Bahner	Lotte Lehmann Eva; Kerstin Thorborg Magdalena	Hans Hermann Nissen Hans Sachs; Herbert Alsen Veit Pogner; Georg Maikl Kunz Vogelsang; Rolf Telasko Konrad Nachtigall; Hermann Wiedemann Sixtus Beckmesser; Viktor Madin Fritz Kothner; Anton Dermota Balthasar Zorn; Eduard Fritsch Ulrich Eißlinger; Hermann Gallos Augustin Moser; Alfred Muzzarelli Hermann Ortel; Carl Bissuti Hans Schwarz/Ein Nachtwächter; Karl Ettl Hans Foltz; Charles Kullmann Walther von Stolzing; Richard Sallaba David; Wolf Daucha, Marie Eder, Ludwig Fleck, Josef Fruchter, Lucy Haupt, Martha Karl, Marie Langhans, Erich Majkut, Matthias Oswald, Hans Rosenberg, Oskar Schweiberer, Otto Zuzan Lehrbuben
Der Corregidor by Rosa Mayreder and Hugo Wolf, August 11 and 21
Vienna Philharmonic; Choir of Vienna State Opera; Bruno Walter	Lothar Wallerstein; Robert Kautsky, Ladislaus Czettel	Kerstin Thorborg Donna Mercedes; Jarmila Novotna Frasquita, Gattin des Müllers; Polly Batic Duenna, im Dienste des Corregidors; Bella Paalen Manuela, Magd bei Juan Lopez	Gunnar Graarud Don Eugenio de Zuniga, Corregidor; Carl Bissuti Juan Lopez, Alkalde; William Wernigk Pedro, dessen Sekretär; Nicola Zec Tonuelo, Gerichtsbote; Ludwig Hofmann Repela, Diener des Corregidors; Alfred Jerger Tio Lukas, Müller; Hermann Gallos Ein Nachbar; Alfred Muzzarelli Ein Nachtwächter

=== 1937 ===
Die Zauberflöte by Emanuel Schikaneder and Wolfgang Amadeus Mozart, July 30, August 7, 16 and 31
Vienna Philharmonic; Choir of Vienna State Opera; Arturo Toscanini	Herbert Graf; Hans Wildermann Settings	Júlia Osváth Königin der Nacht; Jarmila Novotna Pamina; Hilde Konetzni Erste Dame; Stefania Fratnik Zweite Dame; Kerstin Thorborg Dritte Dame; Dora Komarek Papagena	Alexander Kipnis Sarastro; Helge Roswaenge Tamino; Willi Domgraf-Fassbaender Papageno; Alfred Jerger Sprecher; Richard Sallaba Priester; William Wernigk Monostatos; Anton Dermota, Carl Bissuti Zwei Geharnischte; Kurt Pech, Albert Feuhl, Fritz Mascha Drei Knaben; Hugo Lindinger, Harry Horner, Eduard Fritsch Drei Sklaven
Le nozze di Figaro by Lorenzo Da Ponte and Wolfgang Amadeus Mozart, August 11, 19 and 30
Vienna Philharmonic; Choir of Vienna State Opera; Bruno Walter	Lothar Wallerstein; Alfred Roller; Margarete Wallmann Choreography	Aulikki Rautawaara Contessa d'Almaviva; Esther Réthy Susanna; Angelica Cravcenco Marcellina; Jarmila Novotna Cherubino; Dora Komarek Barbarina; Maria Kastl, Grete Zehetmayer Brautjungfern	Mariano Stabile Conte d'Almaviva; Ezio Pinza Figaro; William Wernigk Basilio; Virgilio Lazzari Bartolo; Viktor Madin Antonio; Giuseppe Nessi Don Curzio
Euryanthe by Helmina von Chézy and Carl Maria von Weber, August 18 and 25
Vienna Philharmonic; Choir of Vienna State Opera; Bruno Walter	Lothar Wallerstein; Clemens Holzmeister, Marielouise Luksch; Margarete Wallmann, Willy Fränzl Choreography	Maria Reining Euryanthe von Svoyen; Kerstin Thorborg Eglantine von Puiset; Dora Komarek Bertha	Herbert Alsen König Ludwig VI; Karl Friedrich Adolar, Graf von Nevers; Alexander Svéd Lysiart, Graf von Forest; Eduard Fritsch Rudolf, ein Lehensmann

== Repertory ==
In addition to the new productions, the following works from the repertory were performed at the Salzburg Festival.

=== 1935 ===
- Così fan tutte, cond. Felix von Weingartner, August 5 and 19
- Don Giovanni, cond. Bruno Walter, August 1, 8, 15, 23 and 28
- Fidelio, cond. Arturo Toscanini, August 7, 14, 24 and 31
- Le nozze di Figaro, cond. Felix von Weingartner, August 13 and 30
- Der Rosenkavalier, cond. Josef Krips, July 30, August 9 und 27
- Tristan und Isolde, cond. Bruno Walter, July 27

=== 1936 ===
- Così fan tutte, cond. Felix von Weingartner, July 29 and August 25
- Don Giovanni, cond. Bruno Walter, July 28, August 4, 13 and 24
- Falstaff, cond. Arturo Toscanini, July 31, August 10, 20 and 26
- Fidelio, cond. Arturo Toscanini, July 25, August 5, 16 and 31
- Le nozze di Figaro, cond. Felix von Weingartner, July 27 and August 29
- Tristan und Isolde, cond. Bruno Walter, August 27

=== 1937 ===
- Don Giovanni, cond. Bruno Walter, August 2, 13 and 28
- Elektra, cond. Hans Knappertsbusch, August 8 and 22
- Falstaff, cond. Arturo Toscanini, July 26, August 9 and 23
- Fidelio, cond. Arturo Toscanini, August 24 and 26
- Die Meistersinger von Nürnberg, cond. Arturo Toscanini, August 5, 12 and 20
- Orfeo ed Euridice, cond. Bruno Walter, July 31 and August 14
- Der Rosenkavalier, cond. Hans Knappertsbusch, July 27, August 6 and 24

== Salzburg Festival: history and repertoire, 1922–1926 ==
- Salzburg Festival: history and repertoire, 1922–1926

== Sources ==
- Kaut, Josef (1982). Die Salzburger Festspiele 1920–1981, Mit einem Verzeichnis der aufgeführten Werke und der Künstler des Theaters und der Musik von Hans Jaklitsch. Salzburg: Residenz Verlag. ISBN 3-7017-0308-6.
