= Hermann Wiedemann =

German operatic baritone (1879–1944

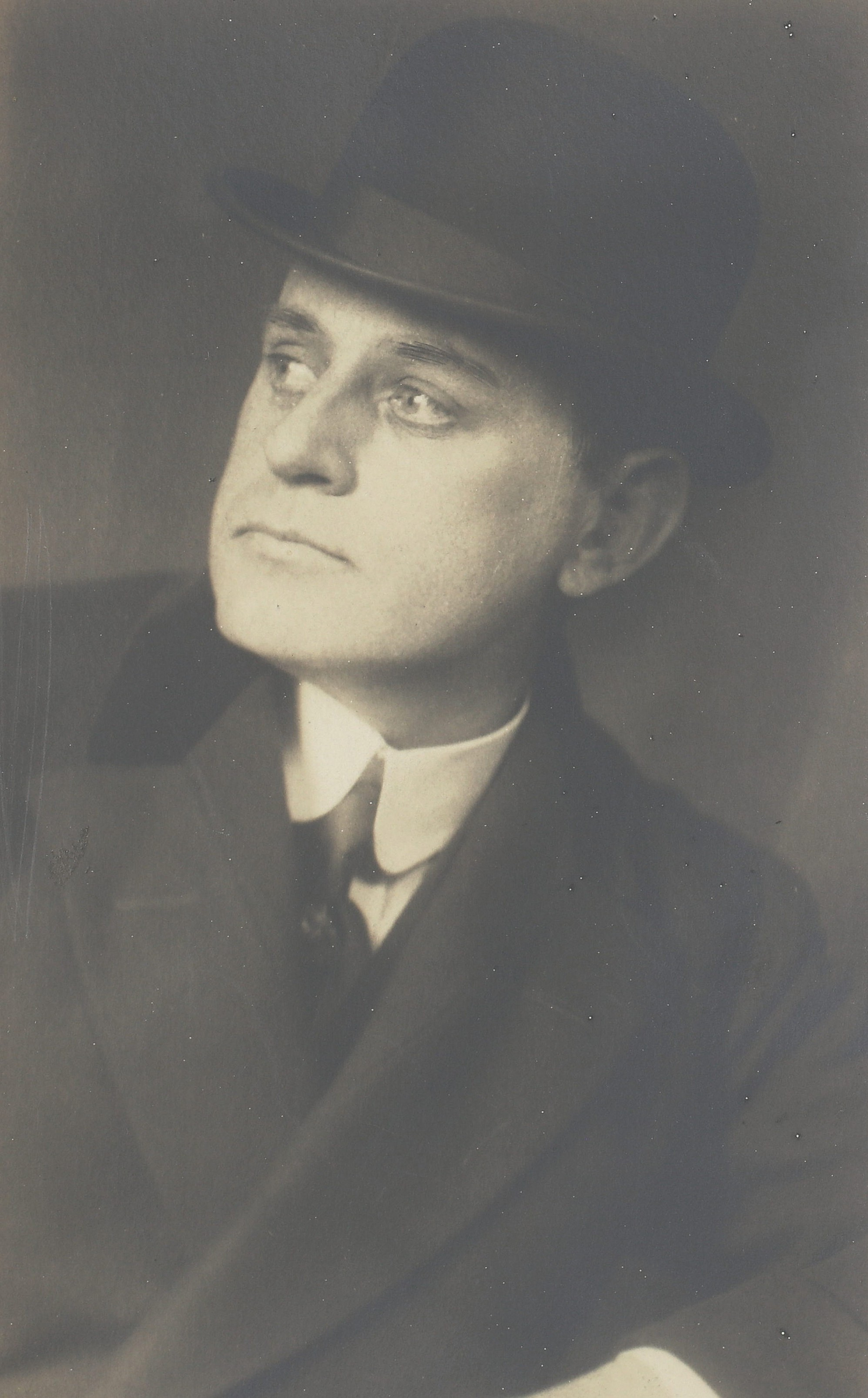
- Photograph of Wiedemann by Franz Löwy, 1919
- Born: 7 March 1879; Neuhausen, Bavaria
- Died: 21 June or 1 July 1944 (aged 65); Strengberg, Lower Austria
- Occupations: Operatic baritone; Academic teacher
- Organizations: Vienna State Opera; Salzburg Festival; Zoppoter Festspiele; Wiener Musikakademie
- Title: Kammersänger

Hermann Wiedemann (7 March 1879 – 21 June or 1 July 1944) was a German operatic baritone and academic teacher. He was a long-term member of the Imperial Court Opera in Vienna from 1916, where he appeared as Faninal in Der Rosenkavalier by Richard Strauss 196 times, and as Beckmesser in Wagner's Die Meistersinger von Nürnberg 155 times. He was Beckmesser also in a recording from the Salzburg Festival 1937, conducted by Arturo Toscanini. He performed internationally at leading opera houses and festivals, such as the Teatro Colón of Buenos Aires and the Zoppoter Festspiele. He appeared in the world premieres of Wolf-Ferrari's I gioielli della Madonna in Berlin, Busoni's Die Brautwahl in Hamburg, and Lehár's Giuditta in Vienna.

== Life and career ==
Wiedemann was born in the Neuhausen district of Munich. He was trained as a baritone and made his debut in 1904 at the Stadttheater Elberfeld (now part of Wuppertal) where he was engaged for two seasons. From 1906 until 1909, he worked at the Mahen Theatre in Brno, then for four seasons at the Hamburg State Opera, and from 1913 at the Berlin Court Opera. His guest appearances began in 1907 at the Dresden Court Opera and in 1909 at the Bavarian State Opera. In 1913, he appeared as Faninal in Der Rosenkavalier by Richard Strauss at the Royal Opera House in London.

In 1916, he followed a call to the Imperial Court Opera in Vienna, which became the Vienna State Opera in 1918. He remained there for the rest of his career. The roles he performed most often in Vienna were Faninal in Der Rosenkavalier, performed 196 times, and Wagner's Beckmesser in Die Meistersinger von Nürnberg, performed 155 times, Alberich in Der Ring des Nibelungen and Klingsor in Parsifal. He also performed in Mozart operas, Beethoven's Fidelio and in Italian operas. He appeared as Escamilio in Bizet's Carmen, and in operas by Alban Berg, Julius Bittner, Marco Frank, Wilhelm Kienzl, Erich Wolfgang Korngold, Otto Nicolai, Hans Pfitzner, Ermanno Wolf-Ferrari and Alexander von Zemlinsky. His repertoire also included Viennese operettas by Johann Strauss and Franz Lehár. In 1930, he was awarded the title Kammersänger. At the Salzburg Festival, he first appeared as Guglielmo in Mozart's Così fan tutte in 1922, returned in 1925 as Malatesta in Donizetti's Don Pasquale, and appeared from 1929 until 1941 almost annually as Faninal. Arturo Toscanini cast him in 1936 and 1937 as Beckmesser, a production that was recorded. It remained the only leading role of the singer that has been preserved in its entirety. James Forrest of Fanfare magazine praised the performance, when Wiedemann was already aged 58 but sang with a "well-preserved" voice.

He performed as a guest at the Liceu of Barcelona in 1927, at La Monnaie in Brussels in 1936, the Teatro Colón of Buenos Aires in the 1930s, and in London as Beckmesser in 1938. He also gave a guest performance at the Munich Opera Festival as Donner and Alberich in the Ring cycle, and from 1934 to 1941 almost every year at the Zoppoter Festspiele, a festival in the Forest Opera of Sopot known as the Bayreuth of the North.

Wiedemann was also a significant concert singer. From 1942, he taught operatic dramatic performance at the Wiener Musikakademie.

Wiedemann was married to Marie Dopler a dramatic soprano who performed in Brno, Hamburg and Magdeburg. She also appeared at the Vienna Court Opera in the 1911–12 season, as Elektra in the opera by Richard Strauss, Ortrud in Wagner's Lohengrin and Brünnhilde in Siegfried. She died in 1942 and was buried in her family's grave at Hietzinger Friedhof on 13 June 1942.

According to Oesterreichisches Musiklexikon, Wiedemann died at a sanatorium in Strengberg, Lower Austria, at the age of 65.

== List of roles ==
=== Premieres ===
- 1911: I gioielli della Madonna by Ermanno Wolf-Ferrari, Deutsches Künstlertheater Berlin (23 December) – as Raffaele
- 1912: Die Brautwahl by Ferruccio Busoni, Hamburger Stadttheater (15 April) – as Voswindel
- 1934: Giuditta by Franz Lehár, Wiener Staatsoper (20 January) – as Manuele Biffi

=== Repertoire ===
Wiedemann's roles included:

Beethoven:

- Pizarro in Fidelio

Berg:

- Doktor in Wozzeck

Bittner:

- Hofrat Emil Freiherr von Weidinger in Das Veilchen

Bizet:

- Escamillo in Carmen

Donizetti:

- Belcore in L'elisir d'amore

Humperdinck:

- Peter in Hänsel und Gretel

Janáček:

- Altgesell in Jenůfa

Kienzl:

- Johannes in Der Evangelimann

Korngold:

- Simone Trovai in Violanta
- Frank in Die tote Stadt
- Schwertrichter in Das Wunder der Heliane

Mascagni:

- Alfio in Cavalleria rusticana

Meyerbeer:

- Count Nevers in Les Huguenots

Mozart:

- Count Almaviva in Le nozze di Figaro
- Guglielmo in Così fan tutte
- Papageno in The Magic Flute

Mussorgski:

- Shtshelkalov in Boris Godunov

Nicolai:

- Fluth in The Merry Wives of Windsor

Pfitzner:

- Count Luna in Palestrina

Puccini:

- Marcello in La bohème
- Scarpia in Tosca
- Sharpless in Madama Butterfly
- Jack Rance in La fanciulla del West
- Marcel in Il tabarro
- Ping in Turandot

Johann Strauss (son):

- Dr. Falke in Die Fledermaus

Richard Strauss:

- Jochanaan in Salome
- Orest in Elektra
- Faninal in Der Rosenkavalier
- Harlekin / Music teacher in Ariadne auf Naxos
- Count Waldner in Arabella
- Notary in Intermezzo

Tchaikovsky:

- Count Tomski / Plutus in The Queen of Spades

Verdi:

- Count Luna in Il trovatore
- Paolo Albiani in Simone Boccanegra
- Samuel / Count Horn / Hastings in Un ballo in maschera
- Amonasro in Aida

Wagner:

- Paolo Orsini in Rienzi
- Wolfram in Tannhäuser
- Telramund / Heerrufer Lohengrin
- Melot in Tristan und Isolde
- Beckmesser in Die Meistersinger von Nürnberg
- Donner in Das Rheingold
- Alberich in Das Rheingold, Siegfried and Götterdämmerung
- Klingsor in Parsifal

== Recordings ==
Despite the long duration of his career, there are only a few sound documents. For a long time, acoustic His Master's Voice records from the years 1912 to 1914 (excerpts from Tannhäuser und der Sängerkrieg auf Wartburg and Der Schmuck der Madonna) were the only documents. There is also a shellac with the aria "Ich soll ein Glück entbehren" from Figaro. There are at least three recordings of individual scenes from the Vienna State Opera, as Alberich (with Luise Helletsgruber, Enid Szánthó and Dora With as Rheintöchter), as Klingsor and Beckmesser. The following complete recording is from Salzburg:

- Wagner: Die Meistersinger von Nürnberg, recording of the Salzburg Festival 1937, with Hans-Hermann Nissen (Hans Sachs), Henk Noort (Walther von Stolzing), Richard Sallaba (David), Maria Reining (Eva), Kerstin Thorborg (Magdalene), Herbert Alsen (Veit Pogner), Georg Maikl (Kunz Birdsong), Rolf Telasko (Konrad Nightingale), Hermann Wiedemann (Sixtus Beckmesser), Viktor Madin (Fritz Kothner), Anton Dermota (Balthasar Zorn), Eduard Fritsch (Ulrich Eißlinger), Hermann Gallos (Augustin Moser), Alfred Muzzarelli (Hermann Ortel), Carl Bissuti (Hans Schwarz and Night Watchman) as well as Karl Ettl (Hans Foltz); Konzertvereinigung Wiener Staatsopernchor, Vienna Philharmonic conducted by Arturo Toscanini.

Wiedemann appears as Melot in Wagner's Tristan und Isolde in a recording from Buenos Aires:

- Richard Wagner: Tristan und Isolde, Live-Mitschnitt with Max Lorenz (Tristan), Anny Konetzni (Isolde), Karin Branzell (Brangäne), Herbert Janssen (Kurwenal), Emanuel List (King Marke), Hermann Wiedemann (Melot), Koloman von Pataky (Voice of a sailor, Herdsman), Victor Bacciato (Steuermann); conductor: Erich Kleiber, recorded in the Teatro Colón on 18 September 1938
