= Rolf Telasko =

Austrian operatic bass-baritone

Rolf Telasko, also Ralph Telasco, originally Rudolf (10 August 1911 - 8 March 1991) was an Austrian operatic bass-baritone, later also actor and singing teacher. At the beginning of his career he was engaged at the Vienna State Opera and the Salzburg Festival. He was forced to emigrate from the NS regime in 1939 because of his descent .

After the fall of the Hitler dictatorship, he returned to Europe, was engaged at a number of opera houses and undertook extensive tours.

== Life and career ==
Born in Hollenstein an der Ybbs, Telasko studied singing at the Wiener Musikakademie and at the Neues Wiener Konservatorium as well as musicology at the University of Vienna. He was a pupil of the baritone and singing teacher Viktor Fuchs (1888-1966) and made his debut as Heerrufer in Wagner's Lohengrin at the Volksoper Wien in 1934. From 1934, he was engaged for one season each at the Volksoper, the Vienna State Opera and the Stadttheater Troppau. In 1936 and 1937, he took over the role of Konrad Nachtigall in the legendary new production of die Meistersinger conducted by Arturo Toscanini at the Salzburg Festival, of which a complete recording is available. From 1937, he performed at the Opernhaus Graz and the Landestheater Linz, from 1938 he was also the director of the opera in Linz. After the Annexion of Austria by Hitler's Germany in March 1938, he was still allowed to perform as a half-Jew, but he must have been aware of the danger he was in. He also got a contract for the 1939/40 season, but used the theatre holidays in summer 1939 to escape, quasi at the last minute before the outbreak of World War II. He emigrated to South America via France, Spain and Portugal.

From 1940 to 1943, Telasko was engaged at the Teatro Municipal of Rio de Janeiro and subsequently worked as a guest singer in the United States from 1944 with interruptions until 1953 at the New York City Opera, further in Chicago, New Orleans and Philadelphia. In May 1948, two guest appearances at the Vienna State Opera are recorded, once as Amonasro in Aida, once in the four villain roles of The Tales of Hoffmann. In 1949, he went on tour through Central America.

At the beginning of the 1950s, he shifted the focus of his activities back to Europe. He made guest appearances at the Tiroler Landestheater Innsbruck, and from 1952, he had permanent engagements at German and Swiss opera houses: From 1952 to 54 at the Landestheater Darmstadt, from 1954 to 55 at the Theater Basel, where he played Golaud, Lescaut and Count Almaviva, from 1955 to 61 at the Saarländisches Staatstheater and in 1961 until the end of his career in 1976, at the Opernhaus Zürich. There, he showed the full range of his repertoire, from Mozart and Beethoven to Wagner and Bizet and contemporary composers from both the (E field ?) (Henze, Krenek, Sutermeister) as well as from the (U range ?) (Burkhard), from the classical baritone (Escamillo, Scarpia) to the basso cantante and the character basses (Boris Godunov, King Philipp).

Parallel to his regular engagements, Telasko had the opportunity to perform at important stages throughout Europe - at Teatro La Fenice of Venice and Teatro Comunale di Firenze, Teatro Liceu of Barcelona and Teatro Nacional de São Carlos of Lisbon, in Bordeaux, Lyon, Marseille, Nice and Toulouse, in 1963 and 1965 at the Théâtre de la Monnaie of Brussels, in Basle and Geneva, Prague and Brno, in Duisburg, Düsseldorf, Frankfurt, Cologne, Mannheim, Wiesbaden and Wuppertal. He also returned to North and South America and could be seen and heard at the Teatro Colón of Buenos Aires, in Boston, Baltimore, Pittsburgh and Washington. In 1964, he took over Hans Foltz in Die Meistersinger von Nürnberg at the Bayreuth Festival. He was known for his flexibility, taking on smaller roles as well as big roles. His stage repertoire was very extensive, but he was also successful as a concert singer. In 1982, he left the Zurich Opera House - as music teacher in Ariadne auf Naxos.

By this time, he had already worked as a singing teacher for twenty years. From 1969 to 1971, he was head of the opera class of the Corbett Foundation in Zurich. He also continued his pedagogical work in Darmstadt, where he worked as a singer and actor at the Staatstheater Darmstadt until 1986. His last role was Burgoyn in Schiller's Maria Stuart.

Telasko died in Darmstadt aged 79.

== List of roles ==
=== Premiere ===
- 1967: Madame Bovary by Heinrich Sutermeister, Opernhaus Zürich (26 May) – the blind barrel organ player

=== Repertoire ===
Beethoven:

- Don Pizarro, Don Fernando and second prisoner in Fidelio

Bizet:

- Escamillo, Moralès and Zuniga in Carmen

Burkhard:

- Albert Oberholzer in Das Feuerwerk

Debussy:

- Golaud in Pelléas et Mélisande

Gluck:

- Orest in Iphigénie en Tauride

Giordano:

- Pietro Fléville and Dumas in Andrea Chénier

Henze:

- Cigolotti in König Hirsch

Krenek:

- Pope Clemens VII. and Moritz von Sachsen in Karl V.

Lehár:

- Mirko Zeta in The Merry Widow
- Antonio in Giuditta

Lortzing:

- Offizier in Zar und Zimmermann

Massenet:

- Lescaut in Manon

Mozart:

- Graf Almaviva in Le nozze di Figaro

Mussorgsky:

- Title role in Boris Godunov

Offenbach:

- Lindorf/Coppélius/Miracle/Dapertutto in the Tales of Hoffmann

Puccini:

- Geronte de Ravoir in Manon Lescaut
- Colline in La Bohème
- Scarpia, Cesare Angelotti, Schließer, Sciaronne and Spoletta in Tosca
- Bello in La fanciulla del West
- Ein Mandarin in Turandot

Johann Strauß:

- Ali-Bey, Dr. Falke and Frosch in Die Fledermaus
- Graf Peter Homonay in Der Zigeunerbaron

Richard Strauss:

- Steward to the Field Marshal im Der Rosenkavalier
- music teacher, wigmaker and Lakai in Ariadne auf Naxos
- Mandryka in Arabella

Verdi:

- Monterone, Marullo and Türhüter in Rigoletto
- Christian and Diener Amelias in Un ballo in maschera
- Amonasro in Aida
- König Philipp in Don Carlos

Wagner:

- Heerrufer des Königs und Edler von Brabant in Lohengrin
- Kurwenal in Tristan und Isolde
- Konrad Nachtigall and Hans Foltz in Die Meistersinger von Nürnberg
- Wotan in Die Walküre
- Klingsor in Parsifal

Weber:

- Kuno in Der Freischütz

== Recordings ==
- Giacomo Puccini: Manon Lescaut, recording at the Teatro Colón in Buenos Aires, July 1966, with Montserrat Caballé (Manon Lescaut), Richard Tucker (Des Grieux), Gian Piero Mastromei (Lescaut), Tulio Gagliardo (Commandante), Ralph Telasko (Geronte) and José Nait (Il lampionario); conductor: Bruno Bartoletti
- Johann Strauss jr.: Der Zigeunerbaron, Highlights of the operetta, released in June 1952, with Rolf Telasko (Homonay), Fritz Krenn (Zsupan); conductor: Max Schönherr
- Richard Wagner: Die Meistersinger von Nürnberg, recording of the 1937 Salzburg Festival, with Hans Hermann Nissen (Hans Sachs), Henk Noort (Walther von Stolzing), Richard Sallaba (David), Maria Reining (Eva), Kerstin Thorborg (Magdalene), Herbert Alsen (Veit Pogner), Georg Maikl (Kunz Vogelgesang), Rolf Telasko (Konrad Nachtigall), Hermann Wiedemann (Sixtus Beckmesser), Viktor Madin (Fritz Kothner), Anton Dermota (Balthasar Zorn), Eduard Fritsch (Ulrich Eißlinger), Hermann Gallos (Augustin Moser), Alfred Muzzarelli (Hermann Ortel), Carl Bissuti (Hans Schwarz and Nachtwächter) as well as Karl Ettl (Hans Foltz); Konzertvereinigung Wiener Staatsopernchor, Wiener Philharmoniker conducted by Arturo Toscanini
- Richard Wagner: Tristan und Isolde, excerpts, produced as studio recording in 1973 near Monte Carlo, with Stanley Unruh (Tristan), Gerry de Groot (Isolde), Barbara Pressler (Brangäne), Ralf Telasko (Kurwenal), Opéra de Monte-Carlo Orchestra, directed by Boris Mersson

== Awards ==
- 1980: Silbernes Verdienstkreuz der Republik Österreich
