= Polly Batic =

Austrian operatic mezzo-soprano (1906–1992)

- Born: Leopoldine Batic; 1906; Vienna, Austria-Hungary
- Died: 10 May 1992 (aged 85–86); Vienna, Austria
- Other names: Leopoldine Graf
- Occupation: Operatic mezzo-soprano
- Organizations: Salzburg Festival; Vienna State Opera
- Spouse: Max Graf

Polly Batic (real name Leopoldine Graf, née Batic, 1906 – 10 May 1992) was an Austrian operatic mezzo-soprano who appeared in Europe. She frequently appeared at the Salzburg Festivals between the world wars in roles such as Annina in Der Rosenkavalier by Richard Strauss and Marcellina in Mozart's Le nozze di Figaro. After World War II, she became an ensemble member of the Vienna State Opera. She often appeared in contemporary opera, including the world premiere of Der Prozeß in Salzburg in 1953.

== Life and career ==
Leopoldine Batic was born in Vienna. After completing her vocal studies, she made her stage debut at the Theater Trier in 1929. The same year she married the musicologist and music critic Max Graf (1873–1958). It was his third marriage. He had a son from his first marriage Herbert Graf (1903–1973), who would become an opera director. The lived in Vienna, and she travelled to guest appearances and concerts. From 1931 to 1937, she was engaged every summer at the Salzburg Festival, initially in small roles, then in supporting roles such as Annina in Der Rosenkavalier by Richard Strauss, Marcellina in Mozart's Le nozze di Figaro and the servant in Hugo Wolf's Der Corregidor.

After the Anschluss to Nazi Germany, her husband and stepson had to emigrate to the United States. Batic remained in Vienna but was no longer employed in Salzburg. In the 1941/1942 season, she was engaged at the theatre of Bernburg (Saale), then for two seasons at the municipal theatre of Liegnitz. Max Graf returned to Vienna in 1947, Herbert Graf settled in Switzerland in the early 1960s. In 1948, Batic was engaged by the Vienna State Opera, where she had previously appeared at least twice as a guest – in 1935 as Annina in Der Rosenkavalier, and in 1946 in the title role of Puccini's Madama Butterfly; there, she performed the roles of maids, servants, wet nurses, and one of the valkyries in Wagner's Die Walküre. She frequently appeared in contemporary works, in Vienna in two Menotti operas, The Consul and The Medium, and in Salzburg in 1951 as Margret in Berg's Wozzeck and in 1953 as Frau Grubach in the world premiere of Gottfried von Einem's Der Prozeß after Kafka's novel. These two productions were subsequently shown at the Vienna State Opera. She appeared at the Vienna Volksoper in operetta roles, such as Palmatica in Millöckers' Der Bettelstudent, and as Praskowia in Lehar's Die lustige Witwe.

Batic made guest appearances with the State Opera ensemble, in 1950 at La Scala in Milan, and in 1953 at the Théâtre des Champs-Élysées in Paris. In 1951, she appeared as Schwertleite in Geneva, where Die Walküre could not be performed on stage because that was damaged by fire during a rehearsal. It was given instead in a concert performance in the Victoria Hall, with Robert F. Denzler conducting the Orchestre de la Suisse Romande. The performance, with Gertrude Grob-Prandl as Brünnhilde, Torsten Ralf as Siegmund, Helene Werth as Sieglinde and Ludwig Hofmann as Wotan, was completely recorded for radio, and reissued. The singer retired from the stage in 1963.

She was also successful as an oratorio and lieder singer. Audio recordings document her small roles at the Salzburg Festival. She also recorded lieder by Josef Matthias Hauer and Ernst Krenek.

She died in Vienna on 10 May 1992.

== See also ==
- Salzburg Festival: history and repertoire, 1935–1937
