= Karl Friedrich (tenor) =

Austrian operatic tenor (1905–1981)

Karl Friedrich (15 January 1905 – 8 April 1981) was an Austrian operatic tenor. A member of the Vienna State Opera from 1938 to 1970, he is regarded as one of the leading tenors at the house during World War II and afterwards.

== Life ==
Born in Vienna, Friedrich began as an apprentice metalworker. He studied voice at the Vienna Academy. He had his first engagement in 1931 in Karlsruhe, the following year in Ulm, the next year in Stralsund, from 1934 in Magdeburg, and from 1936 in Düsseldorf.

In 1937, he was invited to appear as Don José in Bizet's Carmen at the Vienna State Opera. A reviewer noted: "We have heard the flower aria only from Romanesque singers with the same passion and with such flowery lips, rarely with such beautiful messa di voce". He then performed at the Salzburg Festival as Adolar in Weber's Euryanthe, conducted by Bruno Walter. Friedrich became a member of the Vienna State Opera on 1 September 1938 and remained at the house until 1970. He sang the entire lyrical-dramatic tenor repertoire.

Friedrich was a regular guest at the Salzburg Festival. He also performed many parts in Franz Lehár's operettas, both on stage and on radio. He recorded the complete operettas Giuditta and Paganini, and appeared as Florestan in a recording of Beethoven's Fidelio, conducted by Clemens Krauss.

Friedrich was awarded the title Kammersänger in 1948. He became an honorary member of the Vienna State Opera in 1973.

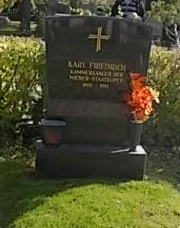
Karl Friedrich's grave

== Death ==
Friedrich died in Vienna, aged 76. He was buried in an honorary grave in the Vienna Central Cemetery.
