= Der Prozeß (opera) =

Opera by Gottfried von Einem

- Opera by Gottfried von Einem
- Translation: The Trial
- Language: German
- Based on: Der Process by Franz Kafka
- Premiere: 17 August 1953; Salzburg Festival

Der Prozeß (The Trial) is a German-language opera in two parts, divided into nine scenes, with music by Gottfried von Einem and a libretto by Boris Blacher and Heinz von Cramer, based on the posthumously published 1925 novel by Franz Kafka. Composed over the period 1950 to 1952, this was von Einem's second opera. He dedicated it to the psychologist and theologian Oskar Pfister, who had been his therapist, and to his former teacher, Karl Christian Jensen.

The opera premiered on 17 August 1953 at the Salzburg Festival, with stage direction by Oscar Fritz Schuh, scene design by Caspar Neher, and Karl Böhm as conductor. The US premiere of the opera was in October 1953 at the New York City Opera, directed by Otto Preminger. The British premiere, attended by the composer Gottfired Von Einem, took place in May 1973, at Bloomsbury Theatre London, in a production, conducted by Leon Lovett, directed by Fuad Kavur.

== Roles ==
Roles, voice type, premiere cast
Role	Voice type	Premiere cast, 17 August 1953 Conductor: Karl Böhm
Josef K.	tenor	Max Lorenz
Franz	bass	Walter Berry
Willem	baritone	Alois Pernerstorfer
The Guard	baritone	Ludwig Hofmann
Frau Grubach	soprano	Polly Batic
Fraulein Bürstner	soprano	Lisa Della Casa
A passer-by	baritone	Ludwig Hofmann
A youth	tenor	Erich Majkut
The examining magistrate	baritone	Oskar Czerwenka
The wife of the bailiff	soprano	Lisa Della Casa
The bailiff	bass	Alois Pernerstorfer
The student	tenor	Peter Klein
The flogger	bass	Oskar Czerwenka
Albert K.	bass	Endré Koréh
The solicitor	baritone	Alfred Poell
Leni	soprano	Lisa Della Casa
The industrialist	baritone	Ludwig Hofmann
The bank deputy director	tenor	Peter Klein
The hunchbacked girl	soprano	Luise Leitner
The chaplain	bass	Ludwig Hofmann
Three gentlemen	Two tenors, baritone	Oskar Czerwenka et al.

== Synopsis ==
=== Part 1 ===
Scene 1, Die Verhaftung – zwei Zimmer (The Arrest – two rooms)
One morning, Josef K., a bank clerk, is arrested by two men, Franz and Willem, without being told the reason for his arrest. Franz and Willem go through his belonging inappropriately, to Josef K.'s annoyance. However, the men tell Josef K. that he may continue to work and move freely. Josef K. begins to suffer mental torment because he does not understand what crime he may have committed.

Scene 2, Fräulein Bürstner – zwei Zimmer (Fräulein Bürstner – two rooms)
After dinner, Josef K. visits his neighbor, Fräulein Bürstner, and discusses his arrest with her. She sits down at the table and begins to take notes. When there is a knock at the door, she tries to persuade her uninvited guest to leave the room. Josef K. then kisses her passionately.

Scene 3, Die Vorladung – Straße (The Subpoena – street)
At night, Josef K. walks on the street, feeling threatened by invisible forces. A stranger walks past him without a word, but then turns around and says that there will be a little investigation regarding his situation next Saturday. Josef K. should not miss the date.

Scene 4, Erste Untersuchung – Dachboden (First Examination – attic)
Josef K. finds the High Court with difficulty, arriving one hour late. The court audience eagerly awaits the start of the trial. Josef K. protests furiously at the court's treatment of him. Among the listeners is a student, who suddenly makes improper advances to the wife of the court usher. The examining magistrate interrupts the trial and retires with his colleagues. The wife of the court usher assures Josef K. that she would do everything in her power to help him. The student then carries her off. After being told that the investigation of the case will continue, Josef K. curses the High Court and leaves.

=== Part 2 ===
Scene 5, Der Prügler – Hausflur (The Whipper – basement)
Josef K. finds Franz and Willem in a dimly lit room, being subjected to corporal punishment. Josef K. believes that this is the result of his complaint about their behaviour during the arrest. Suddenly, the passer-by comes down the stairs and orders Josef K. to go directly to the court chancery.

Scene 6, Der Advokat – zwei Zimmer (The barrister – two rooms)
Josef K.'s uncle, Albert K., brings him to an old solicitor, who enjoys a high reputation. However, instead of questioning Josef K., the solicitor prefers to chat with Albert K.. Meanwhile, Josef K. is in the next room, and meets Leni, the lawyer's maid. They fall into each other's arms and kiss.

Scene 7, Der Fabrikant – Büro in der Bank (The manufacturer – the bank office)
Josef K. tries to continue work as a bank official, but his trial weighs so heavily on his conscience that he cannot concentrate. A client at the bank, a manufacturer, advises Josef K. to visit painter Titorelli and ask him for help. Titorelli has painted almost all of the city's notable figures and thus has important connections.

Scene 8, Der Maler – Atelier (The painter – studio)
In front of Titorelli's house, Josef K. has to squeeze himself through a group of violently shrieking girls to enter the studio. Titorelli, a braggart, explains to Josef K. three ways of how the trial could end: by genuine acquittal (echten Freispruch), apparent acquittal (scheinbaren Freispruch), or protraction (Verschleppung). He advises Josef K. to assess carefully the possibilities and should not lose any time. However, Josef K. is more confused than before.

Scene 9, Im Dom und im Steinbruch (In the cathedral – in the quarry)
Josef K. is so desperate that he goes to the cathedral as a last resort. However, the conversation with the priest gives him no consolation. On the contrary, the priest accuses Josef K. him of seeking too much help from strangers, especially women, and that he lacks foresight.

The stage is then transformed into a quarry. Two men bring in Josef K., and one of them pulls out of his frock coat a large knife. With exquisite courtesy, he passes it over Josef K's head to the other man. Then the stage goes completely dark.

== Music ==
The choice of libretto has been regarded as to express the situation of the existentialism of the post-war era. The composer said that his work, as Kafka's novel, was to express like a parable aspects of the problem of existential guilt, turning to a psychological interpretation of original sin in dialogue ("... das Problem existentieller Schuld, um eine Hinwendung zu einer tiefenpsychologischen und dialogischen Ausdeutung der Erbsünde").

The opera is scored for soloists and orchestra. The vocal lines are declamatory, using moderately modern harmony including elements of twelve-tone serialism. The music quotes at times rhythms from dance music of the early 1950s. The orchestra consists of three flutes (two doubling piccolos), two oboes, two clarinets, two bassoons, four horns, three trumpets, three trombones, tuba. timpani and percussion, piano and strings.

== Recordings ==
- Der Prozess: Lisa Della Casa, Max Lorenz, Ludwig Hofmann, Walter Berry, Alfred Poell; Vienna State Opera Chorus; Vienna Philharmonic; Karl Böhm, conductor (Orfeo C393952I, live recording from the 1953 Salzburg Festival)
