= Lotte Ingrisch =

Austrian writer (1930–2022)

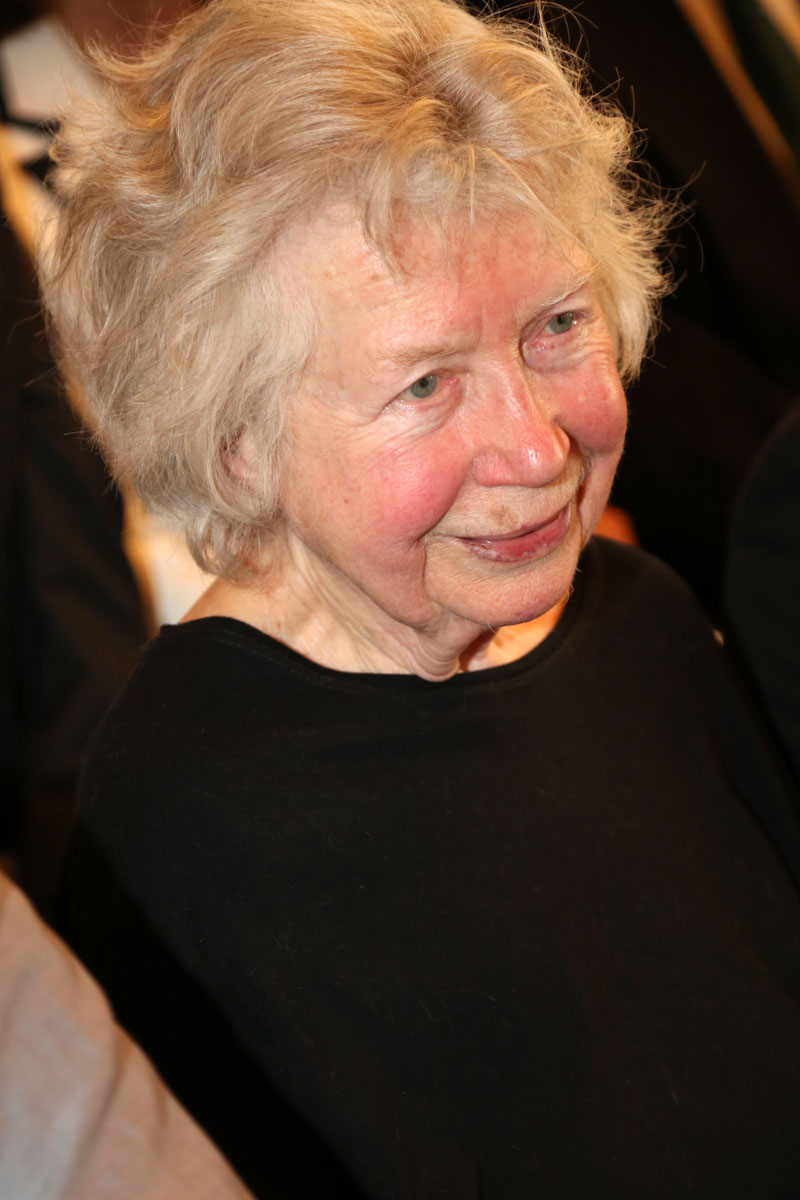
Lotte Ingrisch

Lotte von Einem (born Charlotte Gruber; 20 July 1930 – 24 July 2022), the daughter of Emma and Karl Gruber, was an Austrian author and playwright.

Ingrisch was born in Vienna on 20 July 1930. From 1949 to 1965, the author was married to the Austrian philosopher Hugo Ingrisch. In 1966, she married Austrian composer Gottfried von Einem, who died in 1996, for whom she wrote a number of libretti.

During the fifties and sixties, Lotte Ingrisch published some novels under the pen name "Tessa Tüvari". From the seventies onward, she became a renowned playwright (stage and radio) and wrote libretti for her husband's operas. A good part of her work has been translated into English, Spanish and other world languages, as shown by WorldCat.

Ingrisch died on 24 July 2022, at the age of 92.

== Decorations and awards ==
- Austrian Cross of Honour for Science and Art, 1st class (2001)
- Gold Decoration for Services to Lower Austria (2006)
