= Margarete Wallmann =

Stage director

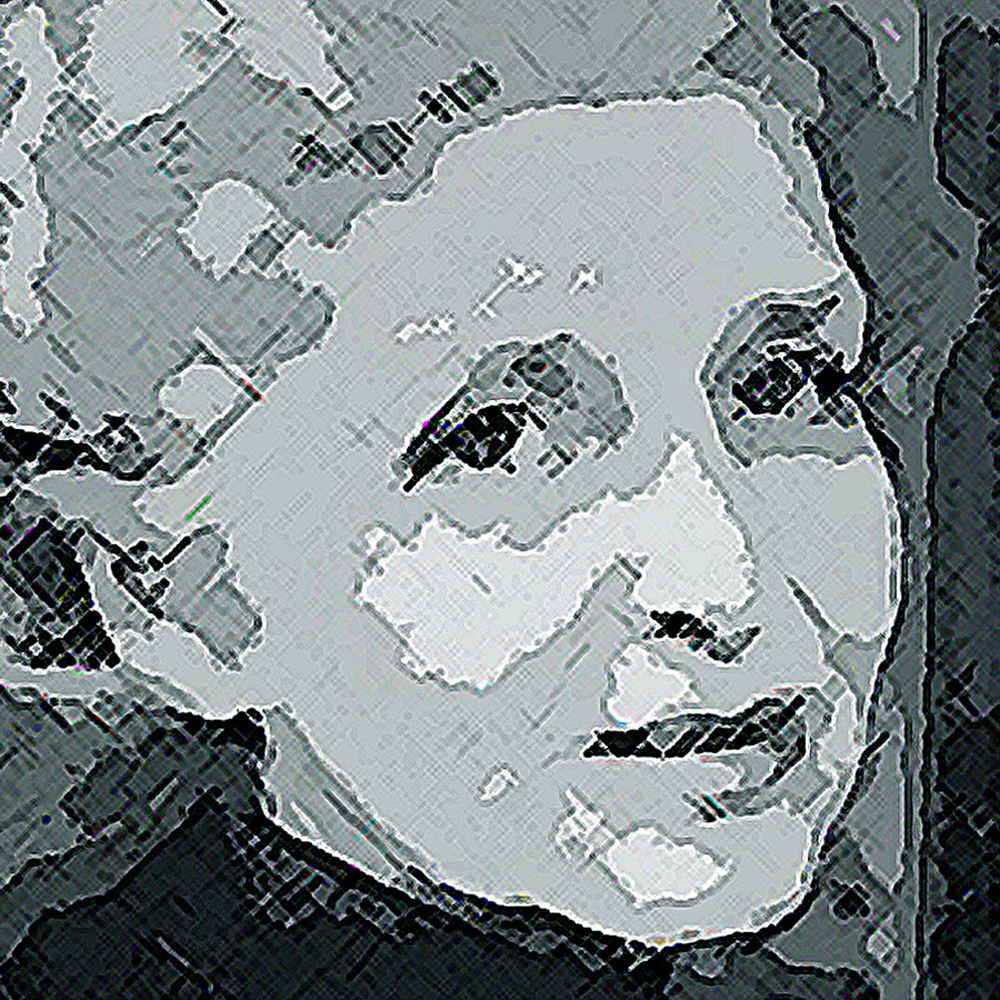
Wallmann (1970)

Margarete Wallmann or Wallman (aka Margarethe Wallmann, Margherita Wallman or Margarita Wallmann) (22 June or July 1901 or 1904 – 2 May 1992) was a ballerina, choreographer, stage designer, and opera director.

== Life and career ==
Born probably in Berlin, Wallmann received classical dancing education from Eugenia Eduardowa (1882–1960) in Berlin, and later from Heinrich Kröller (1880–1930) and Anna Ornelli in Munich. From 1923, she attended Mary Wigman's ballet school in Dresden and for a time belonged to Wigman's touring company, whose members included such future dance stars as Hanya Holm and Gret Palucca. In 1928 she traveled to New York and held lectures there on Wigman's Ausdruckstanz. In 1929 she became head of the Wigman School in Berlin.

In 1930 she founded her own company Tänzer-Kollektiv which in 1931 had already grown to 37 members. Their first production was the "movement drama" Orpheus Dionysos by Felix Emmel with Wallmann as Euridike and Ted Shawn as Orpheus. Shawn invited Wallmann to teach at his Denishawn School of Dancing and Related Arts in Los Angeles. In 1931 the company staged Emmel's Das jüngste Gericht (The Last Judgement) for the Salzburg Festival and performed there again the following year. Due to an accident, however, Wallmann had to quit dancing.

In 1933 she moved to Vienna, and in 1934 became ballet master at the Vienna State Opera and head of its ballet school. In 1938, after Austria's Anschluss to Nazi Germany, due to her "non-aryan" descent, she was let go, as was her soon to be divorced husband, Hugo Burghauser. While Burghauser, on 12 September 1938, fled via Hungary, Yugoslavia and Italy to Canada and finally to the United States, Wallmann found employment as ballet director at the Teatro Colón in Buenos Aires and became a leading figure of dance in Argentine.

In 1949 she returned to Europe and became ballet director of La Scala in Milan. One of the new ballets she created there was Vita dell'uomo by Alberto Savinio (1958). Since 1952, she devoted herself mainly to directing operas. Wallmann became the choice to direct premiere performances, from Darius Milhaud's David to La Scala's 1958 rendition of Turandot, with Birgit Nilsson. Also at the Scala, she directed Maria Callas in Médée (conducted by Leonard Bernstein, 1953), Alceste (conducted by Carlo Maria Giulini, 1954), Norma (1955, the last few seconds of which were filmed), and Un ballo in maschera (1957).

In the 1950s Wallmann worked closely with Poulenc during the composition process and in evolving the structure for Dialogues des Carmélites, with the composer "becoming like an elder brother to me". After directing the premiere she worked closely with him again when she re-staged the production in other theatres. Her husband at this time was the president of Ricordi music publishers.

In 1957 Wallmann returned to the Vienna State Opera to stage Tosca (conducted by Herbert von Karajan, and starring Renata Tebaldi), followed in later years by new productions of Dialogues des Carmelites (1959; conducted by Heinrich Hollreiser; starring Irmgard Seefried, Ivo Žídek, Elisabeth Höngen, Hilde Zadek, Christel Goltz, Rosette Anday, Anneliese Rothenberger), Assassinio nella cattedrale (1960, reviving Wallmann's 1958 La Scala production; conducted by Herbert von Karajan, starring Hans Hotter, Kurt Equiluz, Anton Dermota, Gerhard Stolze, Paul Schöffler, Walter Berry, Hilde Zadek, Christa Ludwig), La forza del destino (1960; conducted by Dimitri Mitropoulos; starring Antonietta Stella, Giuseppe di Stefano, Ettore Bastianini, Giulietta Simionato), Turandot (1961; conducted by Francesco Molinari-Pradelli, starring Birgit Nilsson, Giuseppe di Stefano, Leontyne Price), and Don Carlos (1962; conducted by Oliviero de Fabritiis, starring Flaviano Labò, Boris Christoff, Hans Hotter, Sena Jurinac, Eberhard Wächter, Giulietta Simionato).

In 1958, on 19 and 20 April was the director in the Dialogues of the Carmelites in the Teatro Nacional de São Carlos in Lisbon, with Nicoletta Panni, Gianna Pederzini, Nora Rose, Luciana Serafini, Elda Ribatti, Laura Zanini, Maria Cristina de Castro, Alfredo Kraus, Renato Cesari, Piero De Palma, Vito Susca, Manuel Leitão, Alessandro Maddalena, Armando Guerreiro, Giorgio Giorgetti, Álvaro Malta; Maestro Oliviero de Fabrittis; Stage Designer Alfredo Furiga.

For the Deutsche Oper Berlin she directed Turandot (1965), and La forza del destino (1970).

One of her last productions was Der Rosenkavalier for the Monte Carlo Opera (1987), and her very last production was Donizetti's Il campanello dello speziale for the Fete Nationale, in the Monte Carlo Opera, on 19 November 1990.

She died in Monte Carlo.

== Videography ==
- Ballet stager: Anna Karenina. Directed by Clarence Brown, with Greta Garbo, Fredric March, Basil Rathbone. 1935. IMDB
- Choreographer: Regina della Scala. Directed by Camillo Mastrocinque. 1937. IMDB
- Choreographer: La donna piu bella del mondo. Directed by Robert Z. Leonard, with Gina Lollobrigida, Vittorio Gassman, Robert Alda, Anne Vernon. 1955. IMDB
- Choreographer: Aida Directed by Clemente Fracassi, with Sophia Loren/ Renata Tebaldi, 1953. IMDB
- Director: Turandot with Birgit Nilsson, Conductor Georges Prêtre, 1967 (Legato Classics). operone.de

== Memoir ==
- Les balcons du ciel. Mémoires. Robert Laffont, 1976.
- re-edition under the title: Sous le ciel de l'opéra. Mémoires. Felin, 2004. ISBN 2-86645-562-2
