= Lothar Wallerstein =

Austrian-American musician, conductor, and theatre director

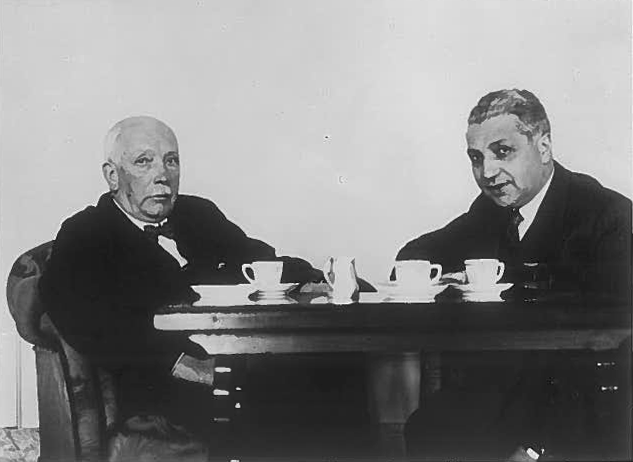
- Richard Strauss and Lothar Wallerstein, April 8 1932
- Born: November 6, 1882; Prague, Austria-Hungary
- Died: November 14, 1949 (aged 67); New Orleans, Louisiana, United States
- Citizenship: United States (1945)
- Occupation: Opera director
- Years active: 1926-49

Signature
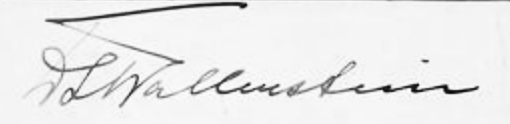

Lothar Wallerstein (6 November 1882 – 14 November 1949) was a Czech-born musician and conductor of Austrian descent who became a U.S citizen in 1945, four years before his death. He was a stage manager at the Vienna State Opera, Salzburg Festival and Metropolitan Opera. He became stage director of the Vienna State Opera in 1926, where in 1931 he collaborated with Richard Strauss in re-writing Mozart’s Idomeneo. He emigrated to New York City in 1940 to evade the rise of Nazi influences in Austria, followed by the German annexation of that country, and the subsequent invasion of the Netherlands where he had sought refuge. At the end of World War II, he returned to Europe, where he taught acting classes for singers, and founded an opera school in The Hague, Netherlands.

== Personal life ==
Wallerstein was born on November 6, 1882, in Prague, Austria-Hungary, to Moritz and Bertha (née Reiniger) as one of six children in a Jewish family devoted to music. He studied medicine, art and music at Charles University in Prague and the Ludwig-Maximilians-Universität München, and he obtained the Diplome de Virtuosite in piano from the Geneva Conservatory in Switzerland.

He married Maria Strug in New York in 1944. Strug was a mezzo-soprano, who had studied voice at Hunter College.

Wallerstein died of a heart attack shortly after the final rehearsal of Richard Strauss’s Salome in New Orleans, on November 14, 1949.

== Career ==
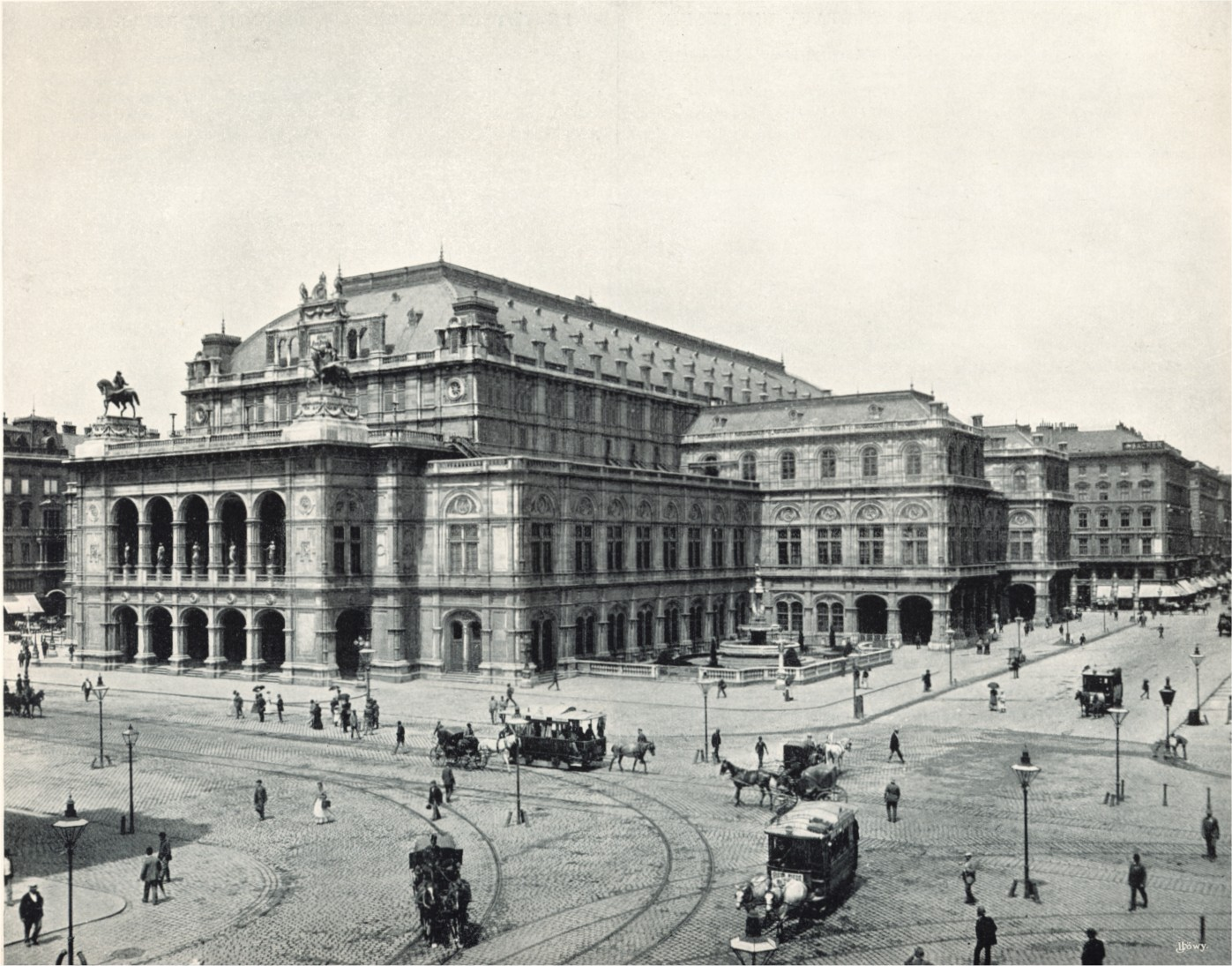
The Vienna State Opera

From 1908 to 1910, Wallerstein worked as a pianist and director at the royal court theater in Dresden. There he met Richard Strauss and played an off-stage piano in the third act of the world premiere of Der Rosenkavalier at the Dresden Opera on January 26, 1911.

Wallerstein was operatic director and stage manager in Posen, Germany, from 1910-1914. With the outbreak of World War I, he returned to medicine, serving as a surgeon in the Austro-Hungarian army on both the Russian and Italian fronts. When the war ended, he was invited to Breslau, Germany, as chief stage director of the Breslau City Theater. From 1922 to 1924, he held the same position at Duisburg where a new theater with updated stage technology gave him more artistic flexibility with set designs.

=== 1926 to 1940 ===
In 1926, The Vienna State Opera invited Wallerstein to stage Andre Chenier with Lotte Lehman and Traian Grozăvescu as principals. He was invited back to Vienna to stage their premier performance of Puccini’s Turandot with Mafalda Salvatini in the title role.

From 1927 to 1930, Wallerstein taught opera classes at the Hoch Conversatory in Frankfurt, Germany—a school noted for such teachers as Clara Schumann and Engelbert Humperdinck. At the same time, he was appointed Oberregisseur at the Frankfurt Opera. There he met the impresario, Clemens Krauss, who conducted Wallerstein's 1927 production of Turandot in Frankfurt.

==== Vienna State Opera ====
Wallerstein’s successes as guest director led to his appointment as chief stage director of the Vienna State Opera in 1927. Franz Schalk was then its sole conductor. From 1919 to 1924, Schalk had shared the conductorship with Richard Strauss, serving as co-conductors until 1924 when Strauss resigned. Five years later, in 1929, Clemens Krauss was appointed Director. There Krauss conducted and Wallerstein produced Turandot.

Wallerstein applied his interest in new acting and staging techniques in a collaboration with Krauss, who joined him in Vienna as conductor and brought new singers to the company. Since the directors were expected to innovate, he was free to implement his new techniques of stagecraft in lighting, staging and directing the movements of the cast on stage. Lotte Lehmann, a well-known opera singer of the time, noted that Wallerstein brought much-needed breath of fresh air to the Viennese opera. As director, he willingly agreed to continue the reformist course Krauss had set in Frankfurt. During Wallerstein’s years at the Vienna State Opera (1927–1938), he directed seventy-five new productions, as well as many old ones.

==== Revision of Idomeneo ====
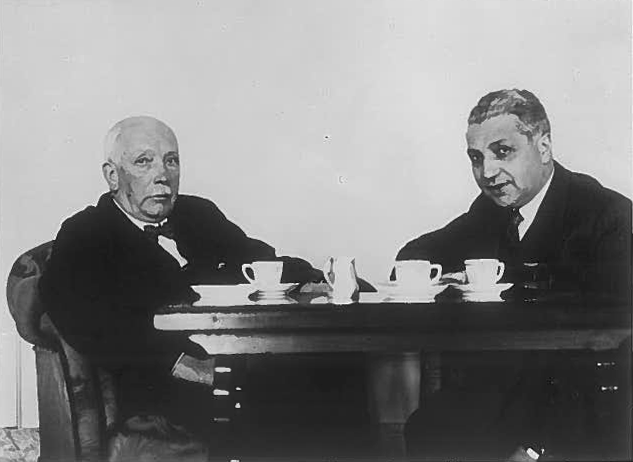
Richard Strauss and Wallerstein, subsequent to their collaborative revision of Mozart's Idomeneo

In 1931, Strauss enlisted Wallerstein’s assistance in up-dating Mozart’s Idomeneo, based on the original libretto by Varesco. Wallerstein translated it from Italian into German prose and then sent it to Strauss for his additions and retractions. The two exchanged revisions through the mail between Strauss's residence in Garmisch to Wallerstein in Vienna. A Strauss letter to Wallerstein illustrates the manner of collaboration: “In eight days I will be finished with the complete Idomeneo (score and everything) and I would ask you to quickly finish the text part of all the arias. So, when I send you the score in a week, the text can be inserted." Their revision of Mozart’s Idomeneo resulted in a new production at the Vienna State Opera, conducted by Strauss himself.

==== Arrival of Nazi influence in Austria ====
From 1926 to 1938, Wallerstein also was Regisseur of the Salzburg Festival, where he worked for eleven consecutive summers, while continuing in his post at the Vienna State Opera. His career flourished despite rising political unrest in Austria. By the summer of 1938, however, the Festival was firmly under Nazi control. Productions by Wallerstein, Herbert Graf, and Margaret Wallmann—all regarded as "non-Aryans"—were replaced by productions that were regarded as "racially pure" and presented in the newly reconstructed Festspielhaus. Among Jewish artists exiled from the Festival were Bruno Walter, Max Reinhardt, Lotte Lehman, Herbert Graf, Hugo Burghauser, Elsa Kurzbauer and Wallerstein.

==== Flight from Vienna ====
At the State Opera in Vienna, where Wallerstein continued working during the winters, he evaded an arrest by the Gestapo and fled to Italy where he already had contracts with Teatro Reale in Rome and Maggio Musicale Fiorentino in Florence. Both contracts, however, were cancelled by Nazi Germany's crackdown on every aspect of Italian life.

Wallerstein then traveled to Amsterdam to join his colleague, Bruno Walter, who had found both political refuge and artistic work. Walter was preparing to conduct Don Giovanni and invited Wallerstein on board as Regisseur. During Wallerstein’s tenure in Holland, he was named professor at the Royal Conservatory of The Hague and, also, at the Conservatory in Amsterdam. When Germany invaded the Netherlands in May 1940, he continued to work until he was dismissed for religious reasons. At that point, he escaped Europe to the United States.

=== 1941 to 1945 ===
While in the United States, Wallerstein found work with the Metropolitan Opera and companies in other cities. He returned to Europe with the conclusion of World War II.

==== Metropolitan Opera ====
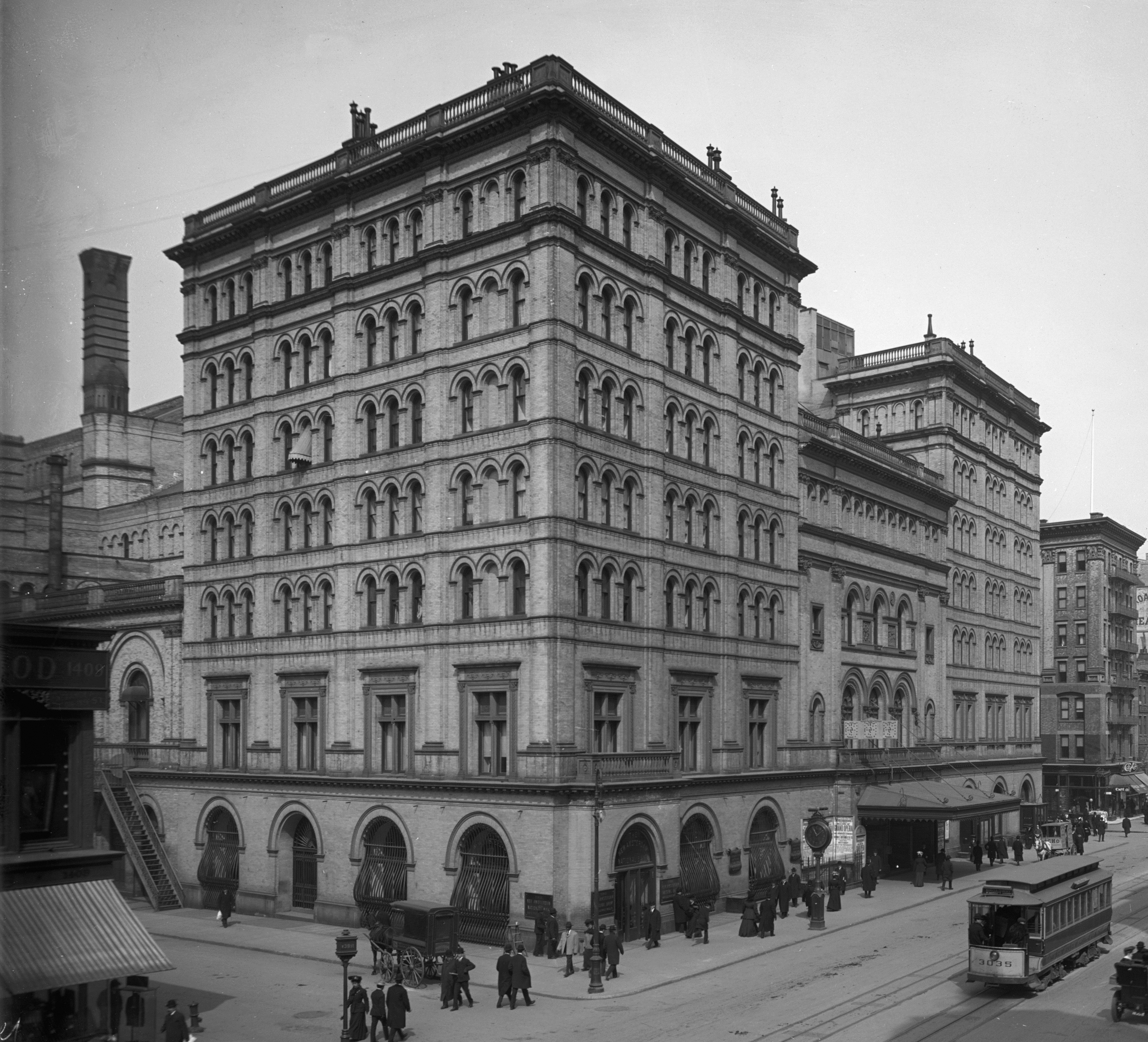
Original Metropolitan Opera house

A June 1941 article in The New York Times described Wallerstein's charm and accomplishments after his arrival in New York City in search of work, initially without English or funds. In that year he joined the Metropolitan Opera as a senior stage director. His debut was on January 9 with the opera, Lohengrin, conducted by Erich Leinsdorf. By the next month, he had directed three more operas and began receiving critical attention from American reviewers such as Oscar Thompson who wrote in Musical America that “The stage direction [of Pagliacci] was expert and imaginative." During Wallerstein’s years at the Met, he directed 28 operas primarily with the conductors, Erich Leinsdorf, George Szell and Thomas Beecham. Appearing in these performances were many well known artists of their day: Ezio Pinza, Lily Pons, Rise Stevens and Helen Traubel.

==== Other engagements ====
While working at the Met, Wallerstein also accepted guest engagements with opera companies in Chicago, Detroit, Rio de Janeiro, and Canada. He taught acting courses in the studios of C. Beeson Fry and Estelle Liebling and for the Griffith Music Foundation with Cesare Sodero, for the Mannes Music School and Hunter College Opera Workshop with Joseph Reitler and Fritz Stiedry as well as (what was then) the Metropolitan Opera University. He also staged operatic scenes for the National Concert and Artists Association’s tour of the Metropolitan Opera Ensemble with Novotna, Glaz, Jobin and Singher.

==== Return to Europe ====
In 1945, the same year World War II ended and the denazification trials began, Wallerstein became a citizen of the United States. Despite his enthusiasm for American life, Wallerstein was drawn back to Europe. The Netherlands Ministry of Education, Arts and Sciences invited him to take over opera classes in the Royal Conservatories of The Hague and Amsterdam.

=== 1946 to 1949 ===
In 1946, Wallerstein settled in The Hague where more opportunities opened for him. He accepted contracts with the Vienna State Opera, La Scala of Milan, and the Maggio Musicale Fiorentino. At this time, conditions in the wake of World War II were bleak. Since the State Opera itself had been razed by Allied bombing, he directed performances at the Volksopera—the first postwar Tannhäuser followed by productions of Schwanda, Boris Godunov, Don Carlos, and Turandot.

During the 1946 Summer Festival in Milan, he produced the staging for Lohengrin and Carmen in the giant Palazzo dello Sport built by Mussolini. Because of its size—155 feet (47 m) wide—he could showcase his expertise in staging mass operatic scenes, such as the bridal scene Lohengrin. As Wallerstein continued alternating guest performances in London (where he performed Fidelio with the entire Vienna Opera), he also continued his work at the Royal Conservatory of The Hague.

== Honors ==
The Austrian government gave Wallerstein the title, Hofrat, for his innovative work at the Vienna State Opera and Salzburg Festival. Richard Strauss dedicated the sixth song of his Opus 56, Die Heiligen drei Könige aus Morgenland, to Wallerstein.

== Bibliography ==
- Götz Klaus Kende: "Zur Erinnerung an Lothar Wallerstein (1882–1949)." In: Richard Strauss-Blätter. 8 (1982), S. 6–10.
- Walter Pass, Gerhard Scheit, Wilhelm Svoboda: Orpheus im Exil. Die Vertreibung der österreichischen Musik 1938–1945. Verlag für Gesellschaftskritik, Wien 1995, ISBN 385115200X.
- Stefan Jaeger (ed.): Das Atlantisbuch der Dirigenten. Eine Enzyklopädie. Atlantis, Zürich 1986, S. 375, ISBN 3254001060.
- Susanne Blumesberger, Michael Doppelhofer, Gabriele Mauthe: Handbuch österreichischer Autorinnen und Autoren jüdischer Herkunft 18. bis 20. Jahrhundert. Band 3: S–Z, Register. Edited by the Österreichische Nationalbibliothek. Saur, München 2002, ISBN 3-598-11545-8, p. 1423.
