= Gottfried von Einem =

Austrian composer (1918–1996)

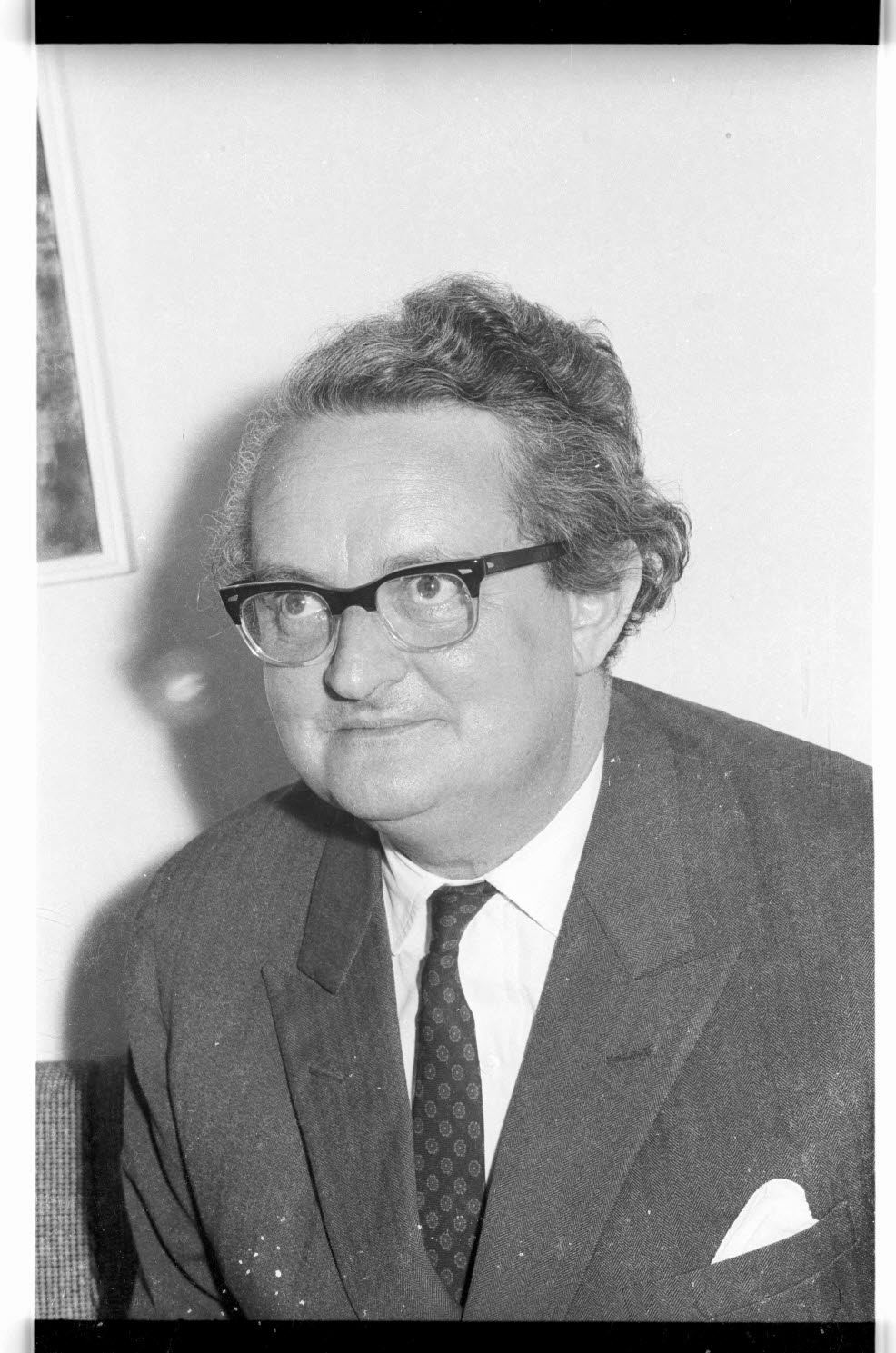
- Von Einem, 1966
- Born: 24 January 1918; Bern, Szitzerland
- Died: 12 July 1996 (aged 78); Oberdürnbach, Austria
- Education: Musikhochsschule Berlin
- Occupation: Classical composer
- Awards: Theodor Körner Prize; Grand Austrian State Prize; Austrian Cross of Honour for Science and Art

Gottfried von Einem (24 January 1918 – 12 July 1996) was an Austrian composer. He is known chiefly for his operas influenced by the music of Stravinsky and Prokofiev, as well as by jazz. He also composed pieces for piano, violin and organ.

== Biography ==
Einem was born in the Swiss capital Bern into the Einem noble family. According to Einem's publisher, his father was William von Einem, military attaché of the Austro-Hungarian embassy. According to another source, however, he was adopted by Einem, his natural father being the Hungarian aristocrat Count László von Hunyadi. His mother, Baroness Gerta Louise née Rieß von Scheurnschloss, an officer's daughter from Kassel, led a lavish lifestyle between Berlin and Paris. The family moved to Malente in the Prussian Province of Schleswig-Holstein, when Gottfried was four years old.

After his school days in Plön and Ratzeburg, Gottfried von Einem went to Berlin in 1937, to study at the State School of Music with Paul Hindemith who nevertheless resigned his post in October that year in protest against his modernist music being banned from public performances by Joseph Goebbels. By the agency of the tenor Max Lorenz, he started an employment as a répétiteur at the Berlin State Opera, where in 1939 Herbert von Karajan became Staatskapellmeister. From 1938 onwards, Einem also worked as an assistant of director Heinz Tietjen at the Bayreuth Festival. In 1941 he began to take counterpoint lessons with Boris Blacher; at that time he wrote his first work, Prinzessin Turandot, at the suggestion of Werner Egk. The ballet was first performed at the Dresden Semperoper conducted by Karl Elmendorff in early 1944 and became a success. Previously in March 1943, Leo Borchard had first performed Einem's composition Capriccio (Op. 2) with the Berlin Philharmonic orchestra.

During World War II, in Berlin, Einem helped to both save the life and continue the professional development of young Jewish musician Konrad Latte by employing him as a rehearsal assistant for Prinzessin Turandot and later helping him obtain other employment. Einem obtained a ration book and membership card of the Reich Musicians' Chamber for Latte, and lent him his own pass to the State Opera as well as introducing him to friends who could help his underground existence.

Through Blacher, Einem met his first wife, Lianne Mathilde von Bismarck (1919–1962) of the Bismarck family, whom he married after the war in 1946. They had a son, Caspar Einem, who was an Austrian cabinet minister. In 1953, the family moved back to Vienna. Lianne von Bismarck died in 1962. In 1966 Einem married his librettist, the renowned Austrian playwright and author Lotte Ingrisch. Apart from Vienna, the couple spent much of their time in the Waldviertel of Lower Austria (specifically, at Oberdürnbach and Rindlberg/Großpertholz), a virtually pristine region that clearly inspired not only his own work, but also the literature of Ingrisch.

Von Einem died in Oberdürnbach in 1996.

== Works ==
Einem composed mainly operas based on dramas. He was internationally recognized after the premiere of his opera Dantons Tod at the Salzburg Festival of 1947, conducted by Ferenc Fricsay. His last operas, starting with Jesu Hochzeit, are based on libretti by his second wife, Lotte.

In 1973 he wrote as a commission of the UN to commemorate the 30th anniversary of its foundation the cantata An die Nachgeborenen for mezzo-soprano, baritone, chorus and orchestra, based on diverse texts. The title is taken from a poem of Bertolt Brecht, translated as To Those Who Follow in Our Wake. The premiere in 1975 in New York with Julia Hamari, Dietrich Fischer-Dieskau, the Chorus of Temple University and the Vienna Symphony was conducted by Carlo Maria Giulini.

In England, Einem had two of his operas premiered within days of each other. In May 1973 The Trial (Der Prozeß) received its premiere at the Bloomsbury Theatre, London, conducted by Leon Lovett, directed by Fuad Kavur. The following week, at Glyndebourne The Visit of the Old Lady (Der Besuch der alten Dame) received its British premiere, conducted by John Pritchard and directed by John Cox.

In May 1996, the chamber chorus Cantori New York, directed by Mark Shapiro, gave the U.S. premiere of Einem's cantata Die träumenden Knaben, for chorus, clarinet and bassoon, on a work by the painter Oskar Kokoschka.

== Awards ==
- 1955 Theodor Körner Prize
- 1958: Preis der Stadt Wien für Musik (Prize of the City of Vienna for Music)
- 1960 Associate Member of the Academy of Arts, West Berlin
- 1965: Grand Austrian State Prize for Music (Großer Österreichischer Staatspreis für Musik)
- 1974: Austrian Cross of Honour for Science and Art
- 1975 Corresponding member of the Academy of Arts, East Berlin
- 1979 Member of the Academy of Arts, West Berlin
- 1993 Member of the Academy of Arts, Berlin
- 2002: posthumously Righteous Among the Nations by Yad Vashem, for helping save the life of musician Konrad Latte

== Operas ==
- Dantons Tod (1947) after the play by Georg Büchner
- Der Prozeß (1953) after the novel by Franz Kafka
- Der Zerrissene (1964) after Johann Nestroy
- Der Besuch der alten Dame (1971) after the play by Friedrich Dürrenmatt
- Kabale und Liebe (1976) after the play by Friedrich Schiller
- Jesu Hochzeit (1980), libretto by Lotte Ingrisch
- Tulifant (1990), chamber opera, libretto by Lotte Ingrisch
- Luzifers Lächeln (1998), libretto by Lotte Ingrisch

== See also ==
- List of Austrians in music
