= Herbert Graf =

Austrian-American opera producer (1903–1973)

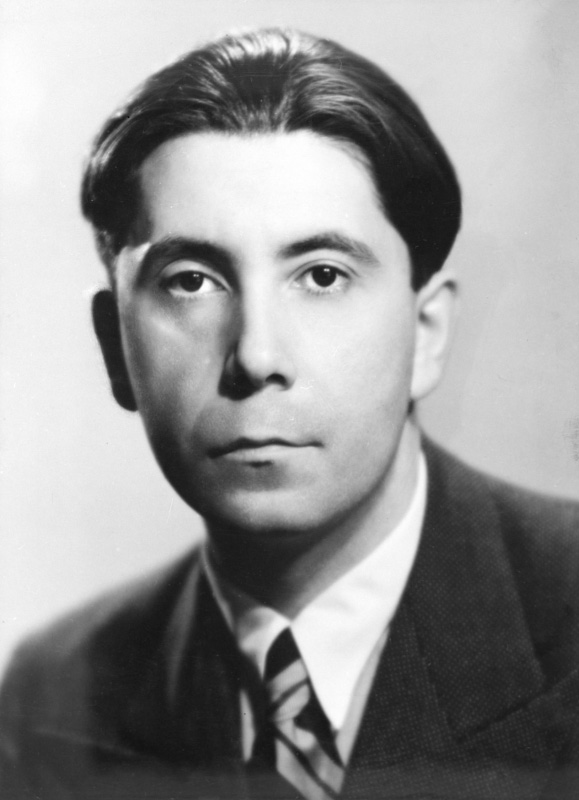
Photo from the 1930s by Wilhelm Willinger

Herbert Graf (10 April 1903 – 5 April 1973) was an Austrian-American opera producer. Born in Vienna in 1903, he was the son of Max Graf (1873–1958), and Olga Hönig. His father was an Austrian author, critic, musicologist and member of Sigmund Freud's circle of friends. Herbert Graf was the Little Hans discussed in Freud's 1909 study Analysis of a Phobia in a Five-year-old Boy.

== 'Little Hans' ==
This was one of just a few case studies which Freud published. In his introduction to the case, he had in the years before the case been encouraging his friends and associates, including Graf's parents, to collect observations on the sexual life of children in order to help him develop his theory of infantile sexuality. Thus Max Graf had been sending notes about his child's development to Freud before Herbert's fear of horses emerged. As "Little Hans", he was the subject of Freud's early but extensive study of castration anxiety and the Oedipus complex. Freud saw Herbert only once and did not analyze the child, but rather supervised the child's father, who carried out the analysis and sent extensive notes to Freud. In the published version, Herbert's father's account is abridged and punctuated by Freud's comments.

When he was four years old, Herbert was witness to a frightening event when he was at the local park in the company of the family's maid. A cart horse pulling a heavy load collapsed. Herbert became fearful of going out into the street, with his fear focused on horses and heavily loaded vehicles, which he was afraid would fall over. This fear was interpreted as a neurosis (equinophobia). Herbert's father initially attributes the neurosis to "sexual over-excitement caused by his mother's caresses" and fear caused by the large penises of horses. While not rejecting these explanations, Freud gradually encourages the father also to understand Herbert's disorder in terms of the anxiety caused by the arrival of his younger sister and an inadequately satisfied curiosity as to the origin of babies. Although a number of sexual and excretal fantasies and anxieties (such as Oedipal wishes and castration anxiety) are explored during the case history, Freud does not ultimately explain the case in terms of these factors, and on occasion reproaches Herbert's father for sticking too dogmatically to a rigidly Oedipal understanding of his son's anxiety. Freud also regrets the parents' unwillingness to tell Herbert the truth about coition.

Freud wrote a summary analysis of "Little Hans", in 1909, in a paper titled Analysis of a Phobia in a Five-year-old Boy. The information gathered from the father included reports of Herbert's dreams, his behavior, and his answers to the father's questions. Freud believed that what he learned from Herbert's situation backed up his ideas about infantile sexuality as outlined in his Three Essays on the Theory of Sexuality in 1905. Herbert's fear was thought to be the result of several factors, including the birth of a little sister, his desire to replace his father as his mother's sexual mate, emotional conflicts over masturbation, and others. The anxiety was seen as stemming from the incomplete repression and other defense mechanisms being used to combat the impulses involved in his sexual development. Herbert's behavior and emotional state improved after he was provided with sexual information by his father, and the two became closer.

Herbert's analysis falls into two distinct stages, the first concerning the fear of horses themselves, and the second of the boxes and containers that they transported around Vienna. In the first phase, Herbert is afraid that a white horse will bite him or come into his room, or will collapse and fall over. Freud interprets this as a fear of the father, fear that the father will punish him for his desires over the mother and to act aggressively towards the father. Because Herbert's father was acting as analyst, Freud conjectures that this fear is impeding the progress of the treatment, something which he resolved by inviting Herbert to see him (Freud) personally and explaining this fear to him:

With this explanation I vanquished the most powerful resistance in Herbert to conscious recognition of his unconscious thoughts, since it was his own father who was taking the role of his physician. From this moment on we had conquered the summit of his condition, the material flowed abundantly, the young patient showed courage in communicating the details of his phobia and soon intervened independently in the course of the analysis.

Following this, Herbert becomes pre-occupied with excrement, which Freud and Herbert's father help him to associate with the birth of babies. The carts and omnibuses are associated with the boxes which, according to the theory of reproduction that Herbert has been given, storks use to bring new babies. Herbert fears the arrival of more babies as this will further reduce the attention he receives from his mother, and expresses the wish that his baby sister should die. He also expresses the wish to have children of his own (with his mother) with his father elevated to the role of grandfather.

Herbert's treatment is taken to be complete when he expresses two new fantasies: one which shows that he has overcome his castration anxiety, and one which consciously acknowledges his desire to be married to his mother. These fantasies coincide with the disappearance of his phobia.

Freud follows the case history with a 40-page assessment of the case in which he links it to his theory of sexuality. He claims that he has learned nothing from this case that he already had not deduced from his analysis of adults, but he is nonetheless "tempted to claim a typical and exemplary importance" for the case in view of the direct and immediate proof of his theories that it appears to provide.

In 1922, Freud wrote a short postscript to the case study, in which he reported that "Little Hans" had appeared in his office as a "strapping youth of nineteen", who "was perfectly well and suffered from no troubles or inhibitions". Minor revisions and additions to the case material were made in 1923–1924.

The conclusions drawn by Freud were strongly criticized by Joseph Wolpe and Stanley Rachman in the essay "A Little Child Shall Lead Them" published first as "Psychoanalytic Evidence: A Critique Based on Freud's Case of Little Hans." in Critical Essays on Psychoanalysis, edited by Stanley Rachman, Macmillan (1963) which maintains that most of the material provided by Herbert was planted in his mind by Freud and Herbert's father.

== Career in opera ==
In 1930, in Frankfurt, Herbert Graf directed the world premiere of Arnold Schoenberg's Von heute auf morgen. In 1936, after holding operatic posts in Münster, Breslau (now Wrocław, Poland), Frankfurt (where he was director of the Opera School at the Hoch Conservatory, 1930–1933; when the Nazis came to power he was released from his duties) and Salzburg, the 33-year-old Graf emigrated to the United States, where he became a successful and popular opera producer at New York's Metropolitan Opera (1936–1960, debuting with Samson and Delilah). He staged new famous productions in the French (The Tales of Hoffmann 1937), Italian (Otello 1937, La forza del destino 1943), then German (Der Ring des Nibelungen 1947, Der Rosenkavalier 1949), repertoires. He also staged the 1947 world premiere of Bernard Rogers's The Warrior. Graf had a strong sense of tradition and encouraged young operatic talent. In the late 1950s, he returned to Europe, where he produced opera at London's Royal Opera House, Covent Garden, (1958–1959). After another year in New York, Graf settled in Switzerland, working at the Zürich Opera (1960–1963), and Geneva's Grand Théâtre (1965–1973).

Graf staged several operas for the Salzburg Festival: Otello (1951, with Wilhelm Furtwängler conducting, 1952 with Mario Rossi conducting; both times with Ramón Vinay as Otello), The Marriage of Figaro (1952, with Rudolf Moralt conducting, with Erich Kunz, George London, Elisabeth Schwarzkopf, Irmgard Seefried, Hilde Gueden; 1953 revival conducted by Furtwängler and Paul Schöffler replacing London), a legendary Don Giovanni conducted by Furtwängler and designed by Clemens Holzmeister (1953, with Cesare Siepi, Elisabeth Grümmer, Anton Dermota, Schwarzkopf, Otto Edelmann, Walter Berry, Raffaele Arié, Erna Berger; revival 1954, with Dezsö Ernster replacing Arié; 1956 with Dimitri Mitropoulos conducting), Gottlob Frick replacing Ernster, Léopold Simoneau replacing Dermota, Lisa Della Casa replacing Schwarzkopf, Fernando Corena replacing Edelmann, Rita Streich replacing Berger) an equally legendary The Magic Flute conducted by Georg Solti and designed by Oskar Kokoschka (1955, cast included Gottlob Frick, Dermota, Schöffler, Kunz, Grümmer, Erika Köth, Peter Klein; revival in 1956 with Berry replacing Kunz); Elektra (1957, conducted by Mitropoulos, with Inge Borkh, Della Casa, Jean Madeira, Max Lorenz, Kurt Böhme), Simon Boccanegra (1961, with Gianandrea Gavazzeni conducting, with Tito Gobbi, Leyla Gencer, Giorgio Tozzi, Rolando Panerai), and finally La rappresentazione di anima e di corpo by Emilio de' Cavalieri (the production premiered in 1968 and was shown each year until 1973).

Graf staged Maria Callas in Les vêpres siciliennes (at the Florence May Festival and La Scala, 1951), Mefistofele (at the Verona Arena, in which Callas alternated with Magda Olivero, 1954), and Poliuto (at La Scala, 1960, also with Franco Corelli and Ettore Bastianini).

For the Arena di Verona Festival, Graf directed several productions of Aida (1954, revival in 1955; 1958; and 1966).

== Publications ==
Among the books written by Herbert Graf were The Opera and Its Future in America (New York, W. W. Norton, 1941), Opera for the People (Minneapolis, University of Minnesota Press, 1951), and Producing Opera for America (Zurich and New York, Atlantis Books, 1961).

== Videography ==
- Mozart: Don Giovanni (Grümmer, della Casa, Berger, Dermota, Siepi, Edelmann; Furtwängler, 1954) [live] Deutsche Grammophon
- Verdi: Falstaff (Carteri, Moffo, Barbieri, Alva, Taddei, Colombo; Serafin, 1956) VAI
- Verdi: Aïda (Gencer, Cossotto, Bergonzi, Colzani, Giaiotti; Capuana, 1966) [live] Bel Canto Society
- Strauss: Elektra (Nilsson, Rysanek, M.Dunn, Nagy, McIntyre; Levine, 1980) [live] Paramount
