= Margit Bokor =

Hungarian opera singer (1903–1949)

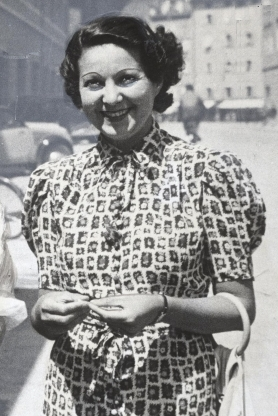
- Born: Margit Wahl; 1 June 1903 or 1 April 1900; Losonc, Kingdom of Hungary, Austria-Hungary
- Died: 9 November 1949; New York City, U.S.
- Occupation: Operatic soprano
- Organizations: Leipzig Opera; Semperoper; Vienna State Opera

Margit Bokor, born Margit Wahl, (1 June 1903 or 1 April 1900 – 9 November 1949) was a Hungarian operatic soprano. She created the role of Zdenka in Arabella by Richard Strauss at the Semperoper in 1933, but then had to leave Germany. She was a member of the Vienna State Opera from 1934 to 1938. She moved to Paris, then emigrated to the United States in 1939, continuing her career at opera houses of the Americas.

== Life and career ==
Wahl was born in Losoncz, Kingdom of Hungary, in what was then the Hungarian Nógrád County, or perhaps in Budapest. She took singing lessons in Budapest and Vienna. She graduated in 1928 from the Budapest Conservatory, and made her stage debut the same year in the title role of Beethoven's Fidelio at the Leipzig Opera, where she was a member to 1930. She sang at the Semperoper of Dresden from 1930 to 1933. She appeared as Leonora both in Verdi's Il trovatore and his La forza del destino, as Dorabella in Mozart's Così fan tutte, Irene in Wagner's Rienzi and the Composer in Ariadne auf Naxos by Richard Strauss, among 42 roles at the house. In Suppé's operetta Boccaccio, she sang the role of Beatrice. In Wagner's Tannhäuser, she was Venus, conducted by Fritz Busch.

Bokor created the role of Zdenka in Arabella by Richard Strauss, premiered on 1 July 1933 in Dresden, conducted by Clemens Krauss, and performed the role also in the U.K. premiere at the Royal Opera House in London a year later.

She had to leave Germany under the Nazi regime, and was a member of the Vienna State Opera from 1934 to 1938. She created the role of Anita in Lehár's Giuditta, alongside Jarmila Novotná and Richard Tauber, conducted by the composer. She appeared at the Salzburg Festival from 1935, as Octavian in Der Rosenkavalier by Richard Strauss, and as Zerlina in Mozart's Don Giovanni, among others. She collaborated with conductors including Bruno Walter and Felix von Weingartner. In Vienna, major roles included Rosalinde in Die Fledermaus by Johann Strauss, Frau Fluth in Nicolai's Die lustigen Weiber von Windsor, and Alice Ford in Verdi's Falstaff. During that time, she appeared at the Slovak National Theatre in Bratislava, in 1936 in Der Zigeunerbaron by Johann Strauss, and in 1937 in Die lustigen Weiber von Windsor.

In 1938, she was "released" from the Vienna State Opera. She moved to Paris, and sang in Amsterdam, Brussels and Antwerp. She moved to North America in 1939, where she continued her career at major houses in St. Louis, Chicago and Philadelphia. In Rio de Janeiro, she sang the title role in Verdi's La traviata and Musetta in Puccini's La bohème. She appeared at the New York City Opera in 1947.

Bokor died in New York City on 9 November 1949. A Memorial Fund of Columbia University is named after her.

== Bibliography ==
- Elisabeth Theresia Hilscher: "Bokor, Margit", Oesterreichisches Musiklexikon 2022
