= Max Graf =

Austrian musicologist and composer (1873–1958)

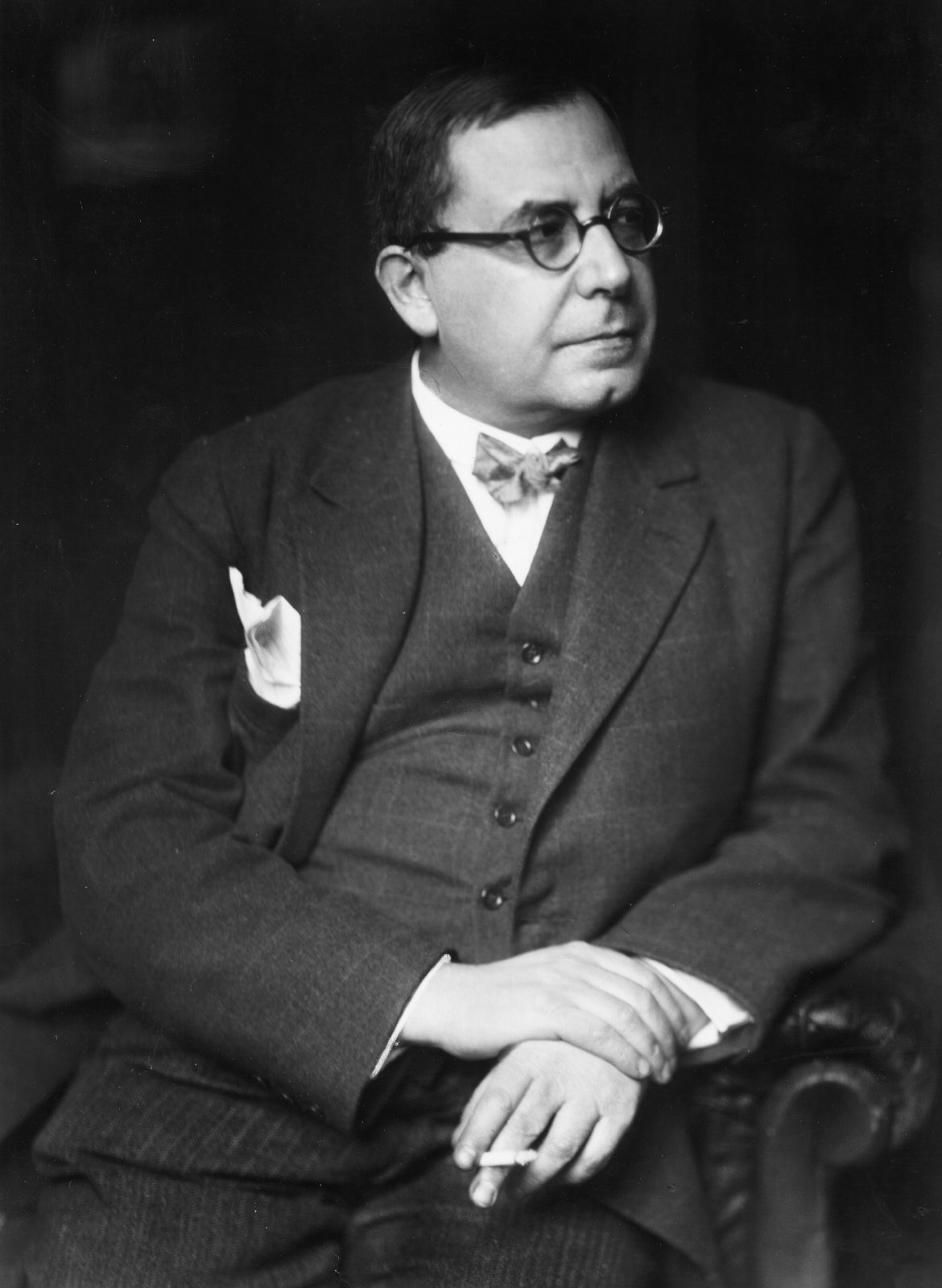
- Max Graf
- Born: 1 October 1873; Vienna, Austria-Hungary
- Died: 24 June 1958 (aged 84); Vienna, Austria
- Education: University of Vienna
- Occupations: Musicologist; critic; composer
- Children: Herbert Graf

Max Graf (Austrian German: [ɡraːf]; 1 October 1873 – 24 June 1958) was an Austrian music historian and critic. Graf was described as the "dean of music critics in Vienna" in the first part of the 20th century. He is also notable for his role in the history of psychoanalysis as the father of Little Hans, whose treatment was described by Sigmund Freud in the case study Analysis of a Phobia in a Five-year-old Boy in 1909.

== Biography ==
=== Early life ===
Graf was born in Vienna into an Austrian-Jewish family. He was the son of Josef Graf, a political writer and editor, and Regine (née Lederer).

Educated in Vienna and Prague, Graf studied law at the University of Vienna from 1891, but devoted most of his time to music, with the intention of becoming a composer. In the introduction to Composer and Critic, Graf details his original interest in music criticism as having stemmed from attending the lectures of Anton Bruckner in Vienna. After graduating in 1896 he focused on music composition on criticism, regularly taking part in meetings of the Young Vienna society.

=== Career ===
From 1902 Graf taught the history of music and musical aesthetics at the Vienna Conservatory, where he became a professor in 1909. He had met Sigmund Freud in 1900, and from the end of 1904 he took part in sessions of the so-called Wednesday Psychological Society, which would form the nucleus of the Vienna Psychoanalytic Society, at Freud's Vienna apartment. Graf's involvement with the society lasted until 1913, producing several essays and books on the psychology of creativity and the arts.

In 1909 Graf moved to Paris as a correspondent for the Frankfurter Zeitung, and also translated works by Romain Rolland into German. Following the Anschluss, Graf fled Vienna for the United States in 1938, where he taught a seminar in music criticism at The New School for Social Research in New York City. He was also a visiting professor at the Carnegie Institute of Technology in Pittsburgh, and at Temple University in Philadelphia.

Graf returned to Austria in 1947, after which he taught music criticism at the State Academy of Music in Vienna, the Mozarteum University in Salzburg, and elsewhere. He died of a stroke in Vienna in 1958.

=== Personal life ===
Graf was married three times. His first wife was Olga Hönig (1877–1961), a former patient of Freud's with an apparently severe personality disorder (her analysis had failed). They divorced in 1920. Max’s mother, Regine, died in 1921. In 1922, he married Rosa Zentner (1895–1928). In early 1928, she died of sepsis following a tonsillectomy. In 1929, Max married the opera singer Leopoldine (Polly) Batic (1906–1992).

== Writings ==
Graf's book Composer and Critic is noted for its amicable style, with M. A. Schubart of The New York Times stating: "Dr. Graf has written a charming, comprehensive, intelligent treatise on music criticism, drawing generously on his own large supply of knowledge and experience ... The only major issue which I cannot reach agreement with Dr. Graf is his manner. He is much too polite. No subject in the world deserves more rudeness than music criticism." Countering this impression, Graf published a sharply critical article on the Metropolitan Opera in 1946, where his son worked as an operatic director.

== Works ==
- Die Musik der Frauen in der Renaissancezeit, diss. (Vienna, 1896; republished as Die Musik im Zeitalter der Renaissance, Berlin: Bard-Marquardt, 1905)
- Deutsche Musik im neunzehnten Jahrhundert (Berlin: Cronbach, 1898)
- Wagner-Probleme und andere Studien (Vienna: Wiener Verlag, 1900)
- Die innere Werkstatt des Musikers (Stuttgart: Enke, 1910)
- Richard Wagner im "Fliegenden Holländer": ein Beitrag zur Psychologie künstlerischen Schaffens (Leipzig: Deuticke, 1911)
- Vier Gespräche über die deutsche Musik (Regensburg: Bosse, 1931)
- Legend of a Musical City (New York: Philosophical Library, 1945)
- Composer and Critic. Two Hundred Years of Musical Criticism (London: Norton, 1946)
- Modern Music. Composers and Music of Our Time, trans. Beatrice R. Maier (New York: Philosophical Library, 1946)
- From Beethoven to Shostakovich. The Psychology of the Composing Process (New York: Philosophical Library, 1947)
- Geschichte und Geist der modernen Musik (Stuttgart/Vienna: Humboldt, 1953)
- Die Wiener Oper (Vienna/Frankfurt am Main: Humboldt, 1955)
- Jede Stunde war erfüllt. Ein halbes Jahrhundert Musik- und Theaterleben (Vienna/Frankfurt am Main: Forum, 1957)

== See also ==
- Psychoanalysis and music
