= Charles Kullman =

American opera singer

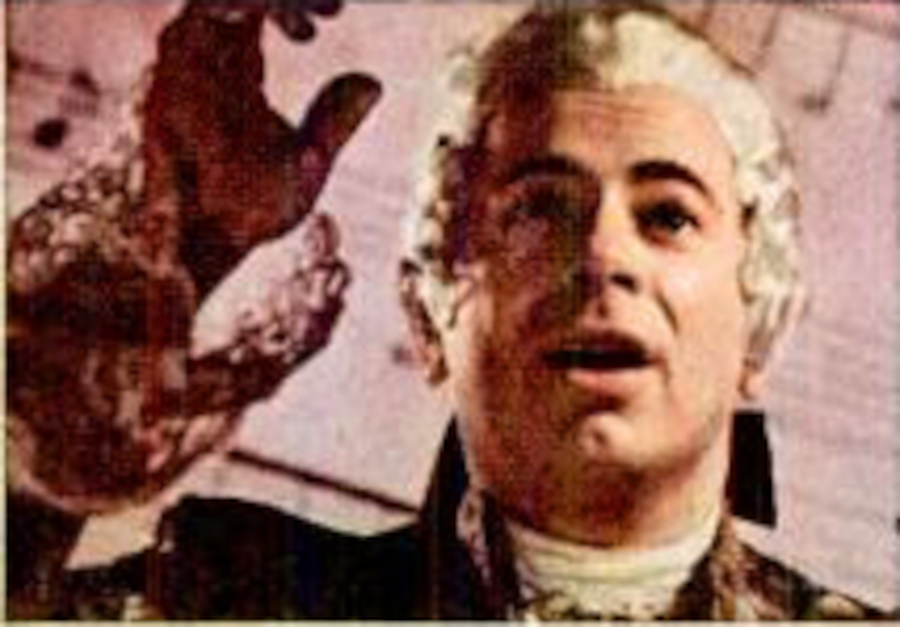
Kullman circa 1945.

Charles Kullman (January 13, 1903 – February 8, 1983), originally Charles Kullmann, was an American tenor who enjoyed a wide-ranging career, both in Europe and America.

== Life and career ==
Charles Kullman was born in New Haven, Connecticut, and began performing in church choir at age eight.

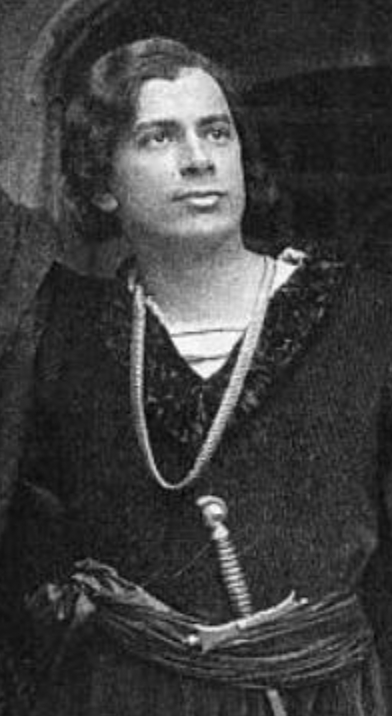
Charles Kullman as Amaury in Yolanda of Cyprus, from a 1929 publication

He attended Yale University, studying medicine. However, after graduating in 1924, he returned to his first interest, music, believing he could succeed in making a career as a singer. He was accepted at the Juilliard School on a scholarship where he studied with Anna Eugénie Schoen-René. After completing three years of study there, he won another scholarship, this one affording him the opportunity to study at the American University in Fontainebleau, France, with Thomas Salignac. Upon returning to America, he taught voice for a while at Smith College, then joined Vladimir Rosing's touring American Opera Company and began singing leading roles.

Two years later, Kullman returned to Europe. An associate brought his name to the attention of conductor Otto Klemperer, which led to his engagement at the Kroll Theater in Berlin, where he made his debut on February 24, 1931, as Pinkerton in Madama Butterfly. A year later, Kullman made his debut at the Berlin Staatsoper, where he became a favorite with the public. During his time there, he worked with Germany's leading conductors, including Wilhelm Furtwängler, Erich Kleiber and Leo Blech.

1934 saw Kullman making his debut at the Vienna State Opera, and the Royal Opera House in London. The following year saw his triumphant debut at the Salzburg Festival, as Florestan in Fidelio, conducted by Arturo Toscanini. His Walther in Die Meistersinger von Nürnberg, in 1936, again with Toscanini, won him further praise. He is heard at this time in the live recording of Das Lied von der Erde, with Kerstin Thorborg, under Bruno Walter, from the Vienna Musikverein (also 1936).

On December 8, 1939, he changed the spelling of his name from Kullmann to Kullman.

After having sung widely in Europe, Kullman returned to America for his debut at the Metropolitan Opera on December 19, 1935, in the title role of Faust. A live recording can be heard of him in this time, singing Alfredo in La traviata, opposite Bidu Sayão and Leonard Warren in 1943, under Cesare Sordero.

In 1947 he appeared in the film Song of Scheherazade as a singing ship's doctor and friend of Nikolai Rimsky-Korsakov. The film was an imaginary episode in the composer's life. Kullman was billed as "Charles Kullmann".

In 25 seasons at the Met, his roles included Don José in Carmen, Pinkerton, Walther, Ottavio in Don Giovanni, Avito in L'amore dei tre re, and Eisenstein in Die Fledermaus. He later took on character roles such as Shuisky in Boris Godunov and Goro in Madama Butterfly, then weightier roles, ranging from Tannhäuser to Parsifal.

In later years he taught voice both at Indiana University (1956–1971) and Curtis Institute of Music (1970–1971).

Charles Kullman died in his native New Haven, Connecticut, aged 80.
