= Max Lorenz (tenor) =

German tenor

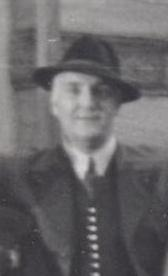
Max Lorenz, Bayreuth, August 1941

Max Lorenz (born Max Sülzenfuß; 10 May 1901 – 11 January 1975) was a German heldentenor famous for Wagnerian roles.

== Career ==
Lorenz was born in Düsseldorf, and studied with Ernst Grenzebach in Berlin in the 1920s. He later was a pupil of Estelle Liebling in New York City. He made his debut at the Semperoper in Dresden in 1927, becoming a principal tenor. From 1929 to 1944 he was a member of the ensemble at the Berlin State Opera, appearing also at the New York Metropolitan Opera (1931–1934), the Bayreuth Festspielhaus (1933–1939, 1952, 1954) and the Royal Opera House Covent Garden (1934 and 1937). He sang, too, at the Vienna State Opera (1929–1933, 1936–1944, 1954).

Audiences at the Salzburg Festival also heard him, and he created roles in such post-World War II works as Gottfried von Einem’s Der Prozess (Josef K, 1953), Rolf Liebermann’s Penelope (1954) and Rudolf Wagner-Régeny’s Das Bergwerk zu Falun (1961).

Lorenz's operatic and recital career lasted almost three decades. He became known as one of the world's leading heldentenors, particularly renowned for his performances as Tristan.

At the height of his career in the 1930s and 1940s, Lorenz possessed a powerful, ringing, impassioned voice. Many of his recordings of operatic arias are now available online. Notably, he was recorded live in a performance of Die Meistersinger at the Bayreuth Festival (1943), under the baton of Furtwängler; and, in a performance of Götterdämmerung, also at Bayreuth (1952), under the baton of Josef Keilberth. He was also a notable Otello, Bacchus and Herod.

== Personal life ==
Lorenz was homosexual, but from 1932 he was married to Charlotte (Lotte) Appel, who was Jewish and was aware of his homosexuality. His homosexuality was mostly tolerated by the Nazis as a well-known secret. When Lorenz had to appear in court because of an affair with a young man, Joseph Goebbels advised Winifred Wagner, the director of the Bayreuth Festival, that Lorenz would not be suitable for the Festival. Wagner answered that in that case she might as well close the Festival because, without Lorenz, "Bayreuth can't be done."

As for his Jewish wife, Lorenz insisted on being open about his marriage, which was taken as a provocation by the Nazis. When Lorenz was away from home, the SS burst in and tried to arrest his wife and mother-in-law. At the last moment they were saved when Lotte Lorenz called the sister of Hermann Göring. The SS was ordered to leave their residence and not to bother the two women. Göring stated in a letter of 21 March 1943 that Lorenz was under his personal protection and that no action should be taken against him, his wife, or her mother.

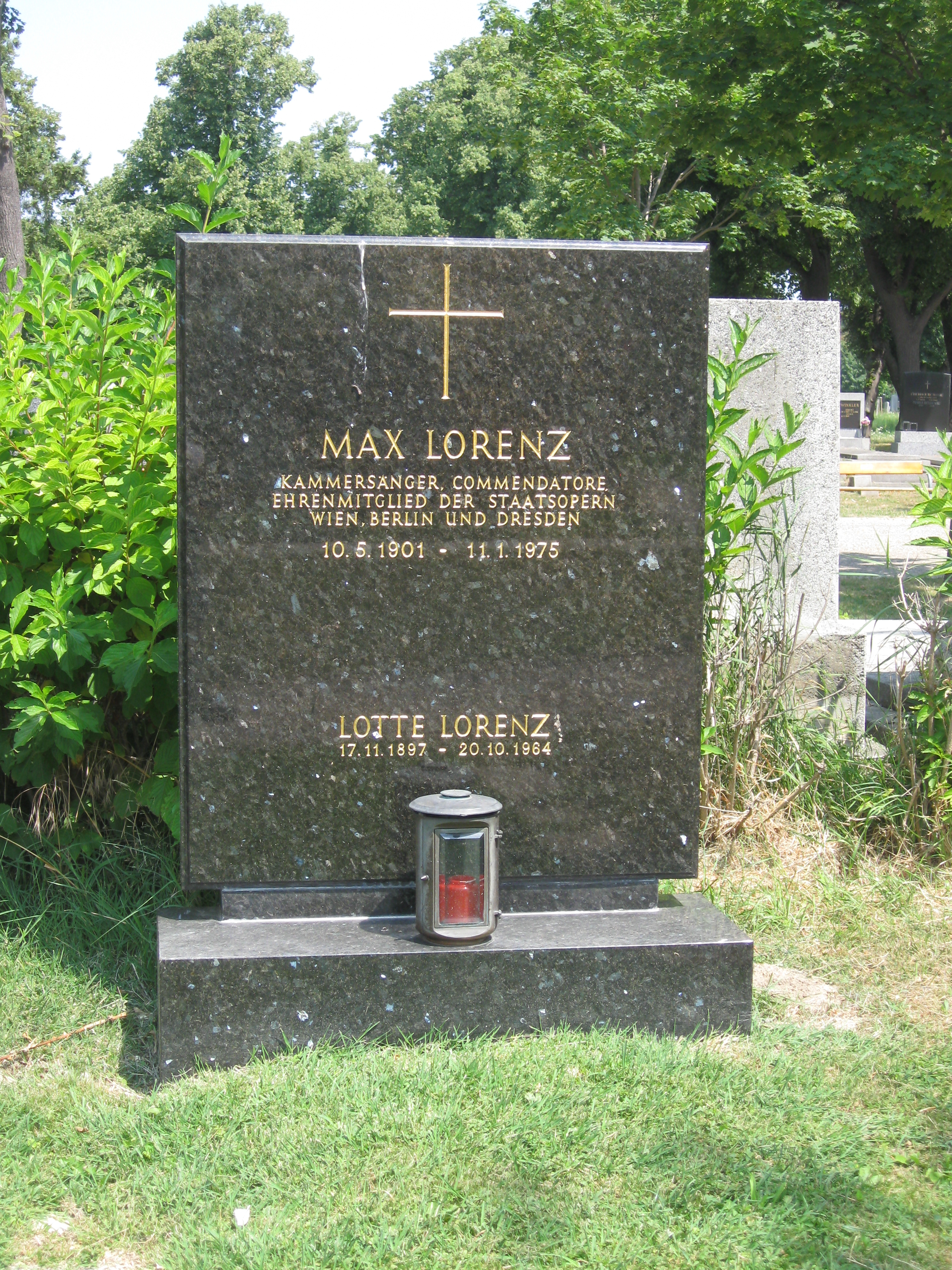
Grave of Max Lorenz in Section 40 (reserved for honorary Austrians) in the Zentralfriedhof in Vienna

Max Lorenz died in Salzburg and is buried at the Zentralfriedhof in Vienna.

== Recordings ==
Max Lorenz made several recordings during his career, especially from the works of Richard Wagner and Richard Strauss. Tristan, as Walther von Stolzing, as Siegmund, Siegfried (in Götterdämmerung), and as Tenor/Bacchus in Ariadne auf Naxos.
