= Giuditta =

1934 operetta by Franz Lehár

Giuditta is an operatic musikalische Komödie (German for musical comedy) in five scenes, with music by Franz Lehár and a German libretto, by Paul Knepler and Fritz Löhner-Beda. Scored for a large orchestra, it was Lehár's last and most ambitious work, written on a larger scale than his previous operettas. Of all his works it is the one which most approaches true opera, the resemblances between the story and that of Bizet's Carmen and its unhappy ending heightening the resonances. Perhaps the best known song in the work is the soprano aria "Meine Lippen, sie küssen so heiß", sung by Giuditta in the fourth scene. Another strong influence, especially for the North African setting, was the 1930 movie Morocco, starring Marlene Dietrich and Gary Cooper in very similar central roles, she being a singer-dancer, he being a soldier.

== Production history ==
The work received its first performance at the Vienna State Opera on 20 January 1934, with Jarmila Novotná and Richard Tauber in the leading roles. The premiere attracted more attention than any of his previous works. It was broadcast live on 120 radio stations across Europe and the United States and ran for 42 performances in its debut season. Despite this initial interest, Giuditta soon faded from the repertoire.

The original production, directed by Hubert Marischka, played 42 times during the season in which it was introduced into the general Vienna opera repertoire. In 1938, after only a few more performances had been played, came the Anschluss and Tauber left town, as did Novotná. Librettist Fritz Löhner-Beda was taken away to a concentration camp and was murdered in Auschwitz.

Giuditta received little attention overseas. It was produced in Budapest shortly after its introduction in Vienna, and the Théâtre de la Monnaie, Brussels, staged a production (translated by André Mauprey) the following season with Kate Walter-Lippert and José Janson in the leading roles. Janson also featured in the first French performance, at Toulouse in 1936, opposite Mme Chauny-Lasson, but Giuditta, in spite of a handful of provincial productions, did not play in Paris, nor London, nor New York. However, the work got a late English-language and American première at the Ohio Light Opera in 1994. It was subsequently also recorded in English by conductor Richard Bonynge, featuring tenor Jerry Hadley.

In 1970 a German television version was made with tenor Rudolf Schock and soprano Teresa Stratas.

== Roles ==
Roles, voice types, premiere cast
Role	Voice type	Premiere cast 20 January 1934 Conductor: Franz Lehár
Anita, a fishergirl	soprano	Margit Bokor
Antonio	baritone	Josef Knapp
Giuditta	soprano	Jarmila Novotná
Manuele Biffi, Giuditta's husband	baritone	Hermann Wiedemann
Octavio	tenor	Richard Tauber
Pierrino, a fruit seller	tenor	Georg Maikl
Professor Martini	bass	Viktor Madin
Sebastiano	tenor	Erich Zimmermann

== Synopsis ==
Scene 1
In the lively Mediterranean town, street singers fill the air with their melodies as the fruit seller Pierrino prepares to bid farewell to his livelihood. He plans to embark on a journey to North Africa with his girlfriend Anita. Meanwhile, the skilled local craftsman Manuele works diligently, devoted to his beautiful wife Giuditta. The scene takes a turn when a group of officers, led by the captivating Captain Octavio, arrive and are entranced by Giuditta's beauty and her soul-stirring song. Infatuated, Octavio implores Giuditta to accompany him on his upcoming voyage. Unable to resist the allure, Giuditta agrees to join him.

Scene 2
Now penniless, Anita and Pierrino seek refuge at Octavio's villa in a North African garrison town. Giuditta offers Anita employment, while Pierrino plans to return home to rebuild his trade. However, things become complicated when Giuditta confesses her love for Octavio, who is troubled by news of a possible regiment relocation.

Scene 3
In the moonlit military encampment, soldiers sing of their nomadic life. Octavio is tormented by the thought of parting ways with Giuditta and contemplates desertion. Giuditta, unaware of Octavio's inner turmoil, yearns for true love.

Scene 4
Separated from Octavio, Giuditta transforms into a nightclub dancer in a bustling North African city. There, she receives a bouquet from the wealthy Englishman Lord Barrymore, who invites her to supper. Meanwhile, Octavio, now a deserter, arrives at the club. He learns of Giuditta's new life and watches her from a distance, consumed by despair.

Scene 5
Four years later, Giuditta has become a renowned dancer and receives an invitation to a private supper with a Duke. To her surprise, the Duke's pianist turns out to be none other than Octavio. Upon recognizing him, Giuditta is taken aback. Octavio reveals his torment over their shattered love, but when Giuditta professes her enduring love for him, he dismisses it, claiming that love no longer holds meaning for him. As the Duke joins Giuditta, Octavio retreats to his piano, playing until the room is empty. Ultimately, he departs, a man broken by love.

== Recordings ==
- Decca GOS 583-4: Hilde Güden; Waldemar Kmentt; Murray Dickie; Emmy Loose; Walter Berry; Oscar Czerwenka; Vienna State Opera Chorus and Orchestra; Rudolf Moralt, conductor
- EMI Classics ZDMB-65378: Edda Moser; Nicolai Gedda; Brigitte Lindner; Martin Finke; Günter Wewel; Willi Boskovsky; Munich Radio Symphony And Chorus. Digitally recorded in May 1980.
- Original cast recordings of six numbers were made in Vienna by Odeon on 11 January 1934, with the composer conducting the Vienna Philharmonic. These include four solos by Tauber, one by Novotná, and their duet "Schön wie die blaue Sommernacht".
