= Richard Sallaba =

Austrian actor and operatic tenor

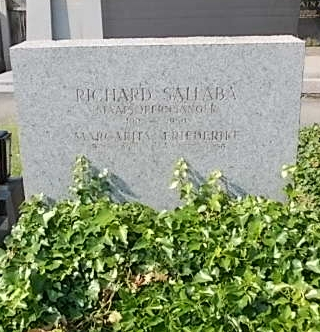
Grave of Richard Sallaba

Richard Sallaba (23 November 1905 – 2 May 1956) was an Austrian stage actor and operatic as well as operetta tenor.

== Life ==
Born in Vienna, after his Abitur, Sallaba attended the University of Music and Performing Arts Vienna, where he studied acting with Rudolf Beer and took speech lessons with Zdenko Kestranek. From 1927 to 1931, he worked as an actor at the Wiener Volkstheater, then he decided to become a singer. He travelled with an operetta group through the Netherlands, Belgium and West Germany. In 1933–1934, he worked in Solothurn and from 1934 until 1935 in Bern. He was then a member of the Vienna State Opera from 1936 to 1945, and in 1946 at the Volksoper Wien. He was especially successful in the buffo field, he also sang operetta parts at the Berlin Metropoltheater from 1941 to 1942, worked at the Salzburg Festival (among other things he was part of the Opera casts of the Salzburg Festival 1938 to 1944 in Fidelio -1938-) and was also active as a singing teacher.

Sallaba died in Vienna aged 50. His last resting place is at the Döbling Cemetery in Vienna.
