= Kerstin Thorborg =

Swedish opera singer (1896–1970)

Kerstin Thorborg (19 May 1896 – 12 April 1970) was a Swedish mezzo-soprano opera singer. She was one of the best dramatic Wagnerian singers in the two decades between 1930 and 1950. By all accounts, Thorborg was a magnificent actor with great stage presence. In addition, she was endowed with a beautifully steady and intense tone.

== Biography ==
Born in Venjan, Sweden, Kerstin Thorborg studied singing at the Royal College of Music, Stockholm. She made her debut in 1924 singing the role of Ortrud in Lohengrin. After six successive seasons at the Royal Swedish Opera, Thorborg was engaged for the next two years at the Nuremberg Opera. The famed conductor Bruno Walter (1876–1962) engaged her for the Städtische Oper in Berlin and became her mentor.

Although a contralto, Thorborg's upper register was so secure that she sang numerous mezzo-soprano roles, including Venus, Kundry, Fricka, Waltraute, and Magdalena. She was especially known for her searingly beautiful Brangäne, which was preserved on record. She also appears to wonderful advantage in the live recording of Mahler's Das Lied von der Erde, with Charles Kullmann (1903–1983) under Bruno Walter, at the Vienna Musikverein in 1936 and the even more famous one with the Royal Concertgebouw Orchestra under Carl Schuricht (1880–1967) in 1939.

In 1938, to escape the Nazis, she made her home in the United States, singing various roles at the Metropolitan Opera. She returned to her native Sweden in 1950, after her retirement.

== Personal life ==
In 1928, she married opera singer, actor, screenwriter, theater and opera director, Gustaf Bergman (1880-1952).
