= Karl Ettl =

Austrian operatic bass

Karl Ettl (19 February 1899 – 19 October 1956) was an Austrian operatic bass singer. He was an ensemble member of the Vienna State Opera from 1924 to 1945 and made regular guest appearances at the Salzburg Festival.

== Life and career ==
Born in Vienna, From 1916 to 1920 Ettl was a member of the Peterlini Boys' Choir, a Viennese boys' choir and forerunner of the Vienna Boys' Choir. After his vocal studies, he was engaged by Richard Strauss at the Vienna State Opera in 1924 and made his debut there on 6 September 1924 as the Second Guardsman in The Magic Flute.

He was mostly cast in small and smallest roles, so-called "Charges", but also sang middle parts and regularly various comprimario roles. In total, Ettl impersonated 135 roles in 86 operas at the Vienna State Opera. Ettl also appeared in a number of premieres, for example as the Grail Knight in Parsifal in 1933, as Illo in the world premiere of Jaromír Weinberger's opera Wallenstein in 1937 or as the Helmsman in Tristan und Isolde in 1943.

His middle roles at the Vienna State Opera included Cesare Angelotti in Tosca, Titurel (Parsifal), Zuniga in Carmen, the King in Aida, Micha in The Bartered Bride, Kuno in Der Freischütz and three roles in Mozart operas, Masetto in Don Giovanni and Don Bartolo and Antonio in the Marriage of Figaro.

Ettl was given only a few leading roles, once singing Fafner, twice Fasolt in Das Rheingold, presumably as a stand-in. He continued to appear almost daily on the stage of the Staatsoper after the outbreak of the Second World War. His last performance at the Haus am Ring was The Bartered Bride on 26 June 1944, in which he impersonated Micha for the 100th time.

In 1928 and 1936, he made guest appearances with the Vienna State Opera company at the Paris Opera.

He made his Salzburg Festival debut in August 1928 as the Second Prisoner in Fidelio and as the second priest and second armoured man (The Magic Flute). From then until 1939, he was invited back to Salzburg every year for opera or concert, as Reinmar von Zweter in Tannhäuser, as notary and police commissioner in Der Rosenkavalier, but also as Masetto, whom he embodied for eight festival years, and as Don Bartolo. In 1941, he appeared for the last time in Salzburg as the police commissioner (Der Rosenkavalier).

Ettl was able to show off his powerful voice mainly in the concert hall or during church services. He regularly appeared on Sundays as a soloist in performances of the Vienna Boys' Choir in the Hofburgkapelle. He was in great demand as a soloist in sacred and secular works. Performances in highly diverse contexts are attested, for example on 13 and 14 March 1925 at workers' symphony concerts, in the context of which Liszt's "Workers' Choir" was given, or in the Pfarrkirche Böheimkirchen, where at Hochamt Mozart's Coronation Mass was performed. At the Salzburg Festival, he took the bass solos in eleven concerts.

Ettl's concert repertoire ranged from Mozart's Great Mass in C minor and other church music, for example K. 277 and K. 339 to Beethoven's Missa solemnis, which Ettl sang three times in Salzburg, to Bruckner's Mass No. 3 and Liszt's Christus-Oratorium.

In 1944, he was called up for military service. His fate after the end of the war is unknown. He probably did not perform in opera or concert halls. Karl Ettl died in Vienna in 1956 at the age of 57.
