= Herbert Alsen =

German opera singer (1906–1978)

Herbert Alsen (sometimes Ahlsen; 12 October 1906 – 25 October 1978) was a German operatic bass of formidable volume and stature.

== Biography ==
Alsen debuted as Rocco in Fidelio in Westfalen. In 1936, he performed as the Commendatore in Mozart's Don Giovanni under Bruno Walter, and as Pogner the goldsmith in Wagner's Die Meistersinger von Nürnberg under Arturo Toscanini. Basing his career in Vienna, he went on to play all the great Wagner bass roles, including Gurnemanz, Hunding, Fafner, King Marke and Hagen, and more than forty roles by other composers. He sang at the Metropolitan Opera in the 1938–9 season. He retired in 1959.

== Sources ==
- Norbeck, Peters & Ford, Herbert Alsen (Preiser 90579)
