= Viktor Madin =

Austrian opera singer

Viktor Madin, originally Viktor Madincea, (20 December 1876 – 19 March 1968) was an Austrian opera singer (baritone) of Romanian descent. He was a member of the ensemble of the Vienna State Opera for more than fifty years.

== Biography ==
Madin was born in Lugoj, a city in Timiș County, Banat, belonging today to Romania.

He was one of the longest serving singers of the Vienna State Opera. In the years 1908 to 1959 he sang more than 250 roles in more than 7,000 performances, mainly in smaller and medium parts. He is regarded as the singer with the highest number of performances ever in any opera house. He was named Kammersänger, an honour awarded to distinguished State Opera singers. He was especially successful in the Da Ponte/Mozart roles of Masetto in Don Giovanni and Antonio in Le nozze di Figaro as well as Faninal in Der Rosenkavalier by Hofmannsthal and Strauss. Sometimes he also sang major parts such as Klingsor in Parsifal, Alberich in Der Ring des Nibelungen and Don Alfonso in Così fan tutte. In Der Rosenkavalier over a period of forty-five years (1911-1956) he switched between five roles - 89 times Lakai der Marschallin, once the Notario, 265 times Haushofmeister bei der Feldmarschallin, 201 times Polizeikommissär and 52 times Faninal. In 1955 he was awarded the Decoration of Honour for Services to the Republic of Austria, and in 1966 he was appointed Honorary Member of the Vienna State Opera.

From 1922 to 1946 he was a regular guest at the Salzburg Festival. In the first opera performance of the Festival – Don Giovanni, conducted by Richard Strauss on August 14, 1922 – he sang Masetto. Through all the political changes – from First Republic, Ständestaat, Third Reich and Second Republic – he sang the role of the gardener Antonio in all the Salzburg productions of Le nozze di Figaro from 1922 to 1946.

Madin died in Vienna.

== Literature ==
- Madin, Viktor in Kutsch/Riemens: Großes Sängerlexikon, S. 15041 f (vgl. Sängerlexikon Vol. 3, p. 2160), Verlag K.G. Saur, elektronische Ausgabe der dritten, erweiterten Auflage, Digitale Bibliothek Vol. 33.
- Isabella Ackerl / Friedrich Weissensteiner: Österreichisches Personenlexikon der Ersten und Zweiten Republik, Wien: Ueberreuter 1992
- Franz Hadamowsky / Alexander Witeschnik: Hundert Jahre Wiener Oper am Ring [Jubiläumsausstellung]. Wien: Aktionskomitee 100 Jahr-Feier der Wiener Staatsoper 1969, p. 106
