= Alfred Muzzarelli =

Austrian operatic bass-baritone

Alfred Muzzarelli (27 February 1890 – 5 May 1958) was an Austrian operatic bass-baritone.

== Life ==
Born in Wiener Neustadt the son of a family connected to theatre for generations, Muzzarelli attended the upper secondary school in Wiener Neustadt, where he became a member of the Pennale Fraternity Nibelungia. He studied chemistry in Vienna. During his studies he became a member of the Wiener Burschenschaft Libertas in 1911. He received his musical education at the Wiener Musikakademie. From 1919 until the end of his life, he was engaged at the Wiener Staatsoper. He also performed at the Salzburg Festival for several years.

Muzzarelli died in Schruns at the age of 68.
