= Carl Bissuti =

Austrian operatic bass (1899–1974)

Carl Bissuti (16 February 1899 – 14 September 1974) was an Austrian operatic bass.

== Life and career ==
Born in Stephanshart, Ardagger, Lower Austria, Bissuti originally aspired to the career of a railway official. In Asten he founded a youth choir. At a concert his voice caught the attention and the famous Salzburg Festival singer Richard Mayr campaigned for him to be accepted as a student at the Mozarteum. His singing teacher was Bianca Bianchi. In the 1922–23 season, he was engaged as chorister at the Salzburger Landestheater. This was followed by engagements as an actor, first for three seasons in Salzburg, then for two seasons in Linz. In 1928, he was engaged as a singer in Trier. This was followed by engagements in Troppau. (1932–33), Bielefeld (1933–34) and Darmstadt (1934–35).

In 1934, he was invited by Clemens Krauss for a guest performance at the Vienna State Opera as Sarastro in The Magic Flute. Thereupon he was engaged there from 1935, where he sang almost everything that belonged to his subject, from Mozart to Kienzl, from Verdi to Wagner. The Austrian Theatre Museum features role models from Jaromír Weinberger's Wallenstein' and Lehár's The Land of Smiles'. From 1936 to 1939, he was engaged every summer at the Salzburg Festival. He there sang first under the musical direction of Arturo Toscanini (Magic Flute, Fidelio, Meistersinger of Nuremberg), by Bruno Walter (Così fan tutte) and by Felix von Weingartner (The Corregidor). After the annexation of Austria to Nazi Germany, he was given the title of "The Corregidor" by the conductors Wilhelm Furtwängler, (Meistersinger) and Hans Knappertsbusch (Fidelio, Freischütz and Tannhäuser) to Salzburg.

The singer remained a member of the Vienna State Opera ensemble until 1942, when he received a permanent engagement at the Salzburger Landestheater. In 1944, he was seriously injured during an air raid on Vienna. He had to give up his profession and later moved to Graz.

He was married with the soprano Josefine Stelzer (1902–1958). The couple had at least one son, Kristian Bissuti, born 1940, who became a photographer.

Bissuti died in Graz age 75.

== Roles ==
=== Premiere ===
- 1937: Marco Frank: Die fremde Frau – Wiener Staatsoper (Dr. Chesnel)
- 1937: Jaromír Weinberger: Wallenstein – Wiener Staatsoper (Wachtmeister)
- 1938: Franz Salmhofer: Iwan Tarassenko – Wiener Staatsoper (Exzellenz Burulbasch)

=== Repertoire ===
Beethoven:

- Don Fernando und Rocco in Fidelio

d'Albert:

- Tommaso in Tiefland

Handel:

- Nirenus in Giulio Cesare

Kienzl:

- Friedrich Engel in Der Evangelimann
- Titante in Don Quixote
- Fussel in Der Kuhreigen

Franz Lehár:

- Graf Ferdinand von Lichtenfels in The Land of Smiles

Meyerbeer:

- Il Gran Bramino in L'Africaine

Mozart:

- Don Alfonso in Così fan tutte
- Sarastro in The Magic Flute

Nicolai:

- Herr Reich in The Merry Wives of Windsor

Hans Pfitzner:

- Kardinal von Lothringen und Kapellsänger von Santa Maria Maggiore in Palestrina

Puccini:

- Sonora in La fanciulla del West
- Timur in Turandot

Smetana:

- Benes in Dalibor

Richard Strauss:

- Musketier in Friedenstag

Verdi:

- Graf Monterone in Rigoletto
- Ferrando in Il trovatore
- Doktor Grenvil in La traviata
- Tom, Graf Wartung, Berkley in Un ballo in maschera
- Ein Mönch (Kaiser Karl V.) in Don Carlos
- König und Ramfis in Aida

Wagner:

- Daland in Der fliegende Holländer
- Biterolf in Tannhäuser
- Hans Schwarz and Nigntwatchter in Die Meistersinger von Nürnberg

Weber:

- Kuno und Eremit in Der Freischütz
- Harun al Raschid in Oberon, König der Elfen

Wolf:

- Juan Lopez and Tonuelo in Der Corregidor

Wolf-Ferrari:

- Simon in I quatro rusteghi

== Recordings ==
There are relatively few sound documents from Bissuti. In Salzburg, performances of The Magic Flute and Die Meistersinger von Nürnberg remain. Koch has published archive recordings from the Vienna State Opera, for example Aida (Ramfis) and Der Freischütz (Kuno).
