= Georg Maikl =

Austrian operatic tenor

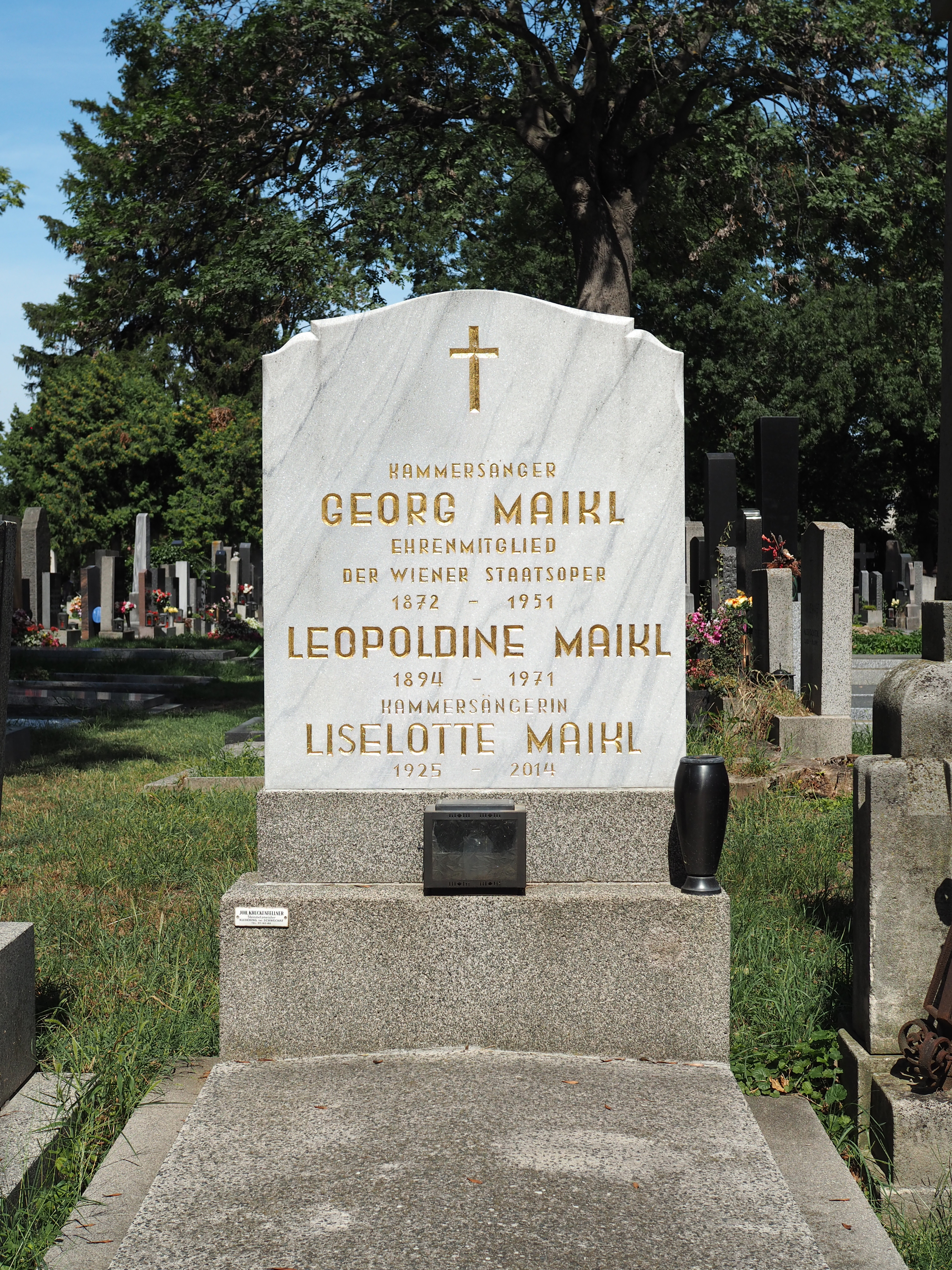
Grave of Georg Maikl and his daughter Liselotte Maikl in the Vienna Central Cemetery

Georg Maikl (4 April 1872 – 22 August 1951) was an Austrian operatic tenor.

== Life ==
Born in Hippach near Zell am Ziller in Tyrol, Maikl came from a family of singers and studied singing in Stuttgart with the tenor Anton Hromada.

After he was discovered by Pollini in 1899, a ten-year engagement at the Hamburg Opera failed because he died shortly afterwards. Instead, Maikl sang at the Mannheim Hofbühne in the same year, where he made his debut in the role of Tamino.

Gustav Mahler brought Maikl in 1904 to the Wiener Staatsoper, where he worked for the rest of his life and sang 99 roles until 1942. From 1906 to 1910, he worked for the Salzburg Mozart festivals and from 1920 for the Salzburg Festival.

Kammersänger Maikl died in Vienna aged 79 and was buried in a grave of honour in the Wiener Zentralfriedhof (group 33A/5/17). In 1959, the Maiklgasse in Vienna-Favoriten was named after him.

His daughter was the soprano Liselotte Maikl (1925–2014).

== Performance ==
Maikl was above all a Mozart singer. But he also sang almost all the lyrical and musical parts, including the leading roles in La Bohème and La traviata, Don Octavio, Belmonte or Faust. In total, he mastered 99 roles and appeared 3062 times on the Vienna stage. Therefore Richard Strauss described him as the most dutiful member of the company. He created the role of Phoebus in the 1914 world premiere of Notre Dame by Franz Schmidt.

== Awards ==
- Goldenes Ehrenzeichen für Verdienste um die Republik Österreich (1929)
- Liste der Ehrenmitglieder der Wiener Staatsoper (1941)
- Kammersänger
