= Anton Dermota =

Slovene tenor

Kammersänger Anton Dermota (June 4, 1910 – June 22, 1989) was a Slovene lyric tenor.

== Early life ==
He was born in a poor family in the Upper Carniolan village of Kropa in what was then the Austro-Hungarian Empire (and is now in Slovenia). He went to the Ljubljana Conservatory with the intention of studying composition and organ, but in 1934 he received a scholarship which sent him to Vienna. There, he devoted himself exclusively to vocal study with Marie Radó.

== Career ==
Dermota made his debut at the opera in Cluj in 1934, and was promptly invited by Bruno Walter to perform at the Vienna State Opera. Here he made his début as "First Man in Armor" in Wolfgang Amadeus Mozart's The Magic Flute in 1936 and got a contract immediately. His first leading role was Alfredo in Giuseppe Verdi's La traviata, which he sang in 1937. In the same year Dermota made his début at the Salzburg Festival in a production of Wagner's Die Meistersinger von Nürnberg, conducted by Arturo Toscanini.

Dermota quickly became a favorite of the Viennese audience and remained with the State Opera's company for more than forty years. He was a witness (and helped to save parts of the furniture) when the opera house burned down after an Allied air raid on March 13, 1945. After the war he stayed with the company in its provisional lodgings at Theater an der Wien, and was one of the stars of the reopening of the original house in 1955 (as Florestan in Beethoven's Fidelio). As early as 1946 Dermota was honoured for his loyalty with the title of Kammersänger.

Anton Dermota sang as a tenor as Alfred in Die Fledermaus in the 1950 London Gramophone recording LLP 305.

For 20 years, Dermota sang at the Salzburg Festival almost every summer. As guest he gave acclaimed performances at the Royal Opera House Covent Garden London, in Palais Garnier and Teatro dell'Opera di Roma, at Teatro di San Carlo in Naples, Teatro Colón in Buenos Aires, in Australia, Czechoslovakia and Hungary.

Dermota was best known for his Mozart roles, especially his Don Ottavio in Don Giovanni. But he sang a good deal of the lyric tenor repertory during his career, including more modern parts, such as Oedipus in Igor Stravinsky's Oedipus rex, the title role of Hans Pfitzner's Palestrina and Flamand in Richard Strauss's Capriccio. Later in life he ventured into heldentenor territory, essaying parts such as the title role in Smetana's Dalibor and Florestan. All told, his repertoire included some 80 roles.

Anton Dermota singing the lied "The Monk" by Benjamin Ipavec, accompanied on piano by his wife Hilde

An accomplished Lieder singer, he gave many recitals accompanied by his wife, the pianist Hilde Berger-Weyerwald. He began a second career as a singing coach at the Wiener Musikhochschule in 1966.

To celebrate his 70th birthday, Dermota sang Tamino in The Magic Flute at the Vienna State Opera. A popular anecdote states that when he spoke the line "Ist's Phantasie, dass ich noch lebe?" ("Is it a fantasy that I am still alive?") the audience broke into spontaneous applause. A year later he sang the Shepherd in Carlos Kleiber's famous recording of Richard Wagner's Tristan und Isolde, sounding astonishingly young.

== Death ==
He died in Vienna less than a month after his 79th birthday.

== Decorations and awards ==
- 1959: Austrian Cross of Honour for Science and Art, 1st class
- 1977: Grand Silver Medal for Services to the Republic of Austria
