= Salzburg Festival: history and repertoire, 1922–1926 =

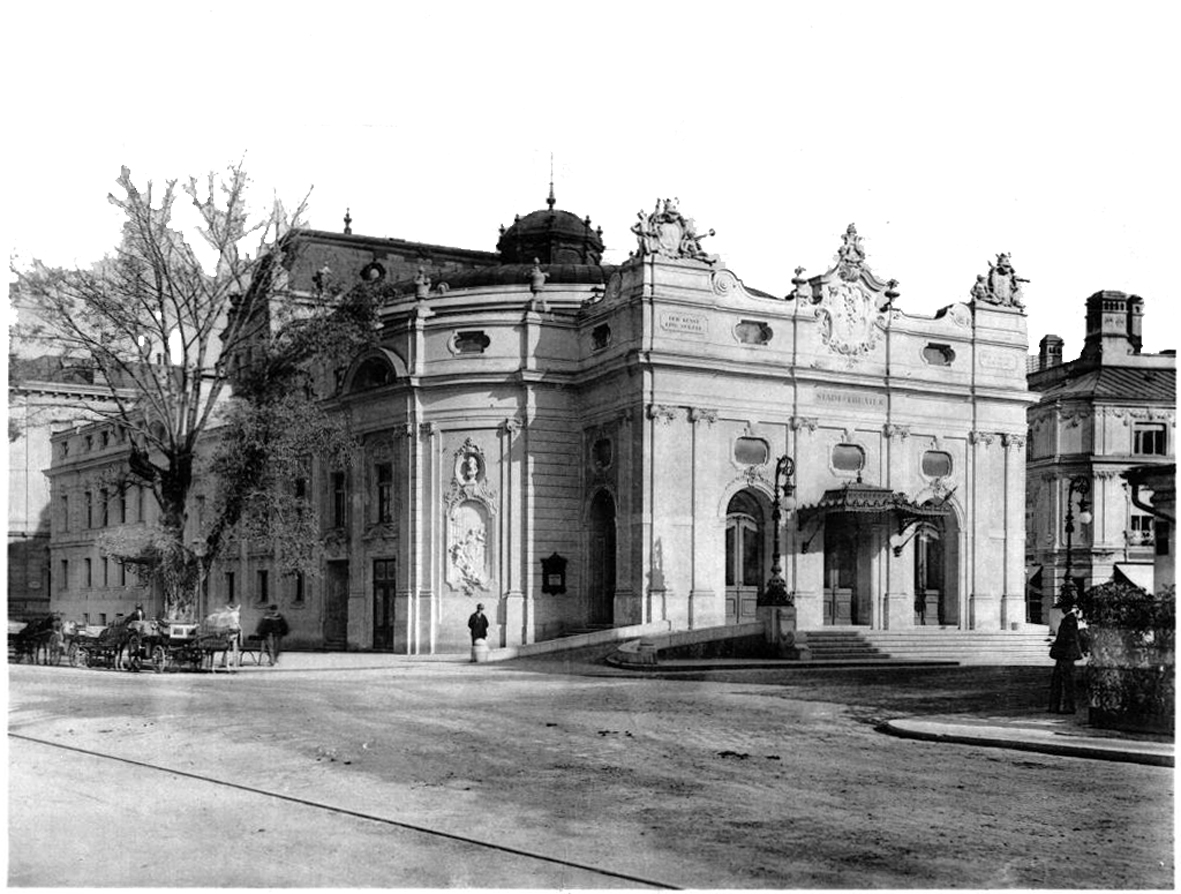
The Salzburg City Theatre, performance venue of the first opera productions at the Salzburg Festival

Salzburg Festival: history and repertoire, 1922-26 lists all opera productions of the Salzburg Festival in its founding years.

== Concept ==
The first Salzburg Festival took place in 1920 — without operas although all concepts for the festival included operas as a main part of the endeavor. The first festival consisted of open air performances of the drama Jedermann [Everyman] by Austrian poet Hugo von Hofmannsthal who wrote several librettos for operas by Richard Strauss. The play was performed at the grand square in front of the Salzburg Cathedral. The play describes the life and death of a rich man and is based on several medieval mystery plays. Jedermann was directed by world-famous Max Reinhardt and was a stunning success. The play is still today performed every year at the same place.

In 1921, concerts were added to the festival program. Concerts of the world's best orchestras, singers and soloists still today represent an important pillar of Salzburg Festival. In 1922, Richard Strauss and Franz Schalk brought opera to the festival. Both were famous conductors and since 1919 functioned also as general managers of Vienna State Opera. They chose four works of Salzburg born genius Wolfgang Amadeus Mozart for the first season — the three Da Ponte operas and Die Entführung aus dem Serail [The Abduction from the Seraglio]. In the founding years the festival did not have the means to produce entire opera productions. So Strauss and Schalk brought the settings, the singers, the orchestra and the chorus from Vienna State Opera to Salzburg. The press critically noted that the opera program of the festival constituted ″the summer residence of Vienna State Opera″. Nevertheless, the performances were superb due to the orchestra, the chorus and the great singers. They came from all over Europa and created excellent ensembles for the Mozart operas, later on also for works by Donizetti, Johann Strauß and Richard Strauss. An important role was also given to set designer Alfred Roller who dominated the visual aspect of the first Salzburg Festival opera performances.

All performances listed took place at the Salzburger Stadttheater.

== 1922 ==
Orchestra, Choir, Conductor	Director, Set Designer	Female singer	Male singer
Don Giovanni by Lorenzo Da Ponte and Wolfgang Amadeus Mozart, August 14 to 26, 1922 (five performances)
Wiener Philharmoniker; Wiener Staatsopernchor; Richard Strauss	Hans Breuer; Alfred Roller settings	Gertrud Kappel Donna Anna; Claire Born Donna Elvira; Lotte Schöne Zerlina	Alfred Jerger Don Giovanni; Richard Mayr Leporello; Franz Markhoff Der Komtur; Richard Tauber Don Ottavio; Viktor Madin Masetto
Così fan tutte by Lorenzo Da Ponte and Wolfgang Amadeus Mozart, August 15 to 27, 1922 (three performances)
Wiener Philharmoniker; Wiener Staatsopernchor; Richard Strauss	Hans Breuer; Alfred Roller settings	Felicie Hüni-Mihacsek Fiordiligi; Rosette Anday Dorabella; Elisabeth Schumann Despina	Hermann Wiedemann Ferrando; Fritz Krauß Guglielmo; Josef von Manowarda Don Alfonso
Le nozze di Figaro by Lorenzo Da Ponte and Wolfgang Amadeus Mozart, August 16 to 28, 1922 (four performances)
Wiener Philharmoniker; Wiener Staatsopernchor; Franz Schalk	Harry Stangenberg, Hans Breuer; Alfred Roller settings	Elisabeth Rethberg Gräfin Almaviva; Elisabeth Schumann Susanne; Hermine Kittel Marcellina; Lotte Schöne Cherubino; Paula von Hentke Barbarina	Hans Duhan Graf Almaviva; Alfred Jerger Figaro; Hans Breuer Basilio; Julius Betetto Bartolo; Viktor Madin Antonio; Hermann Gallos Don Curzio
Die Entführung aus dem Serail by Johann Gottlieb Stephanie and Wolfgang Amadeus Mozart, August 17 to 29, 1922 (four performances)
Wiener Philharmoniker; Wiener Staatsopernchor; Franz Schalk	Hans Breuer; Alfred Roller settings	Selma Kurz Konstanze; Elisabeth Schumann Blondchen Gerhard Stehmann Bassa Selim; Richard Tauber Belmonte; Hermann Gallos Pedrillo; Nikola Zec Osmin	

Cast changes in repeat performances:

- Don Giovanni. Conductor: Karl Alwin; Don Giovanni: Hans Duhan, Donna Elvira: Felicie Hüni-Mihacsek, Donna Anna: Rose Pauly, Don Ottavio: Georg Maikl, Leporello: Karl Norbert, Zerline: Editha Fleischer, Masetto: Julius Betetto.
- Così fan tutte. Conductor: Karl Alwin; Dorabella: Claire Born, Despina: Charlotte Brunner, Don Alfonso: : Karl Norbert.
- Le nozze di Figaro. Gräfin: Claire Born, Felicie Hüni-Mihacsek, Susanne: Editha Fleischer, Figaro: Richard Mayr, Basilio: Paul Kuhn, Bartolo: Karl Norbert, Cherubino: Rosette Anday, Barbarina: Karola Jovanović.
- Die Entführung aus dem Serail. Konstanze: Elisabeth Rethberg, Blondchen: Karola Jovanović, Belmonte: Georg Maikl.

In 1923 there were no operatic performances at the Salzburg Festival. In 1924, the Festival had to be suspended due to an economic crisis in Austria.

== 1925 ==
Orchestra, Choir, Conductor	Director, Set Designer	Female singers	Male singers
Don Giovanni by Lorenzo Da Ponte and Wolfgang Amadeus Mozart, August 24 and 28, 1925 (two performances)
Wiener Philharmoniker; Wiener Staatsopernchor; Karl Muck	Hans Breuer; Alfred Roller settings	Helene Wildbrunn Donna Anna; Claire Born Donna Elvira; Lotte Schöne Zerlina	Alfred Jerger Don Giovanni; Richard Mayr Leporello; Franz Markhoff Der Komtur; Hermann Gallos Don Ottavio; Viktor Madin Masetto
Le nozze di Figaro by Lorenzo Da Ponte and Wolfgang Amadeus Mozart, August 25 to 30, 1925 (three performances)
Wiener Philharmoniker; Wiener Staatsopernchor; Franz Schalk	Hans Breuer; Alfred Roller settings	Claire Born Gräfin Almaviva; Lotte Schöne Susanne; Hermine Kittel Marcellina; Rosette Anday Cherubino; Paula von Hentke Barbarina	Karl Renner Graf Almaviva; Alfred Jerger Figaro; Hans Breuer Basilio; Franz Markhoff Bartolo; Viktor Madin Antonio; Hermann Gallos Don Curzio
Don Pasquale by Giovanni Ruffini and Gaetano Donizetti, August 26 and 29, 1925 (two performances)
Wiener Philharmoniker; Wiener Staatsopernchor; Bruno Walter	Hans Breuer	Maria Ivogün Norina	Richard Mayr Don Pasquale; Hermann Wiedemann Malatesta; Karl Erb Ernesto; Viktor Madin Notar

Cast change in repeat performances:

- Don Giovanni. Zerline: Maria Ivogün.

== 1926 ==
Orchestra, Choir, Conductor	Director, Set Designers	Female singers	Male singers
Die Entführung aus dem Serail by Johann Gottlieb Stephanie and Wolfgang Amadeus Mozart, August 9 and 28, 1926 (two performances)
Wiener Philharmoniker; Wiener Staatsopernchor; Bruno Walter	Alois Moira; Alfred Roller settings	Maria Gerhart Konstanze; Anni Frind Blondchen	Hans Duhan Bassa Selim; Richard Tauber Belmonte; Hermann Gallos Pedrillo; Paul Bender Osmin
Don Giovanni by Lorenzo Da Ponte and Wolfgang Amadeus Mozart, August 10 and 22, 1926 (two performances)
Wiener Philharmoniker; Wiener Staatsopernchor; Franz Schalk	Marie Gutheil-Schoder; Alfred Roller settings	Mária Németh Donna Anna; Claire Born Donna Elvira; Maria Rajdl Zerlina	Hans Duhan Don Giovanni; Richard Mayr Leporello; Franz Markhoff Der Komtur; Richard Tauber Don Ottavio; Viktor Madin Masetto
Die Fledermaus by Karl Haffner, Richard Genée and Johann Strauss II, August 13 to 29, 1926 (five performances)
Wiener Philharmoniker; Wiener Staatsopernchor; Bruno Walter	Josef Hietz	Wanda Achsel Rosalinde; Rosette Anday Orlofsky; Fritzi Massary Adele; Paula von Hentke Ida	Karl Ziegler Eisenstein; Hans Duhan Frank; Erik Wirl Alfred; Karl Renner Dr. Falke; Viktor Madin Dr. Blind; Hans Moser Frosch
Ariadne auf Naxos by Hugo von Hofmannsthal and Richard Strauss, August 18 to 25, 1926 (three performances)
Wiener Philharmoniker; Wiener Staatsopernchor; Clemens Krauss	Lothar Wallerstein; Oskar Strnad settings	Lotte Lehmann Primadonna/Ariadne; Maria Rajdl Komponist; Maria Gerhart Zerbinetta; Luise Helletsgruber Najade; Hermine Kittel Dryade; Karola Jovanović Echo	Viktor Madin Haushofmeister; Hans Duhan Musiklehrer/Harlekin; John Gläser Tenor/Bacchus; Georg Maikl Tanzmeister/Brighella; Hermann Gallos Scaramuccio; Franz Markhoff Truffaldino; Heinrich Berthold Brighella (Vorspiel)

Cast changes in repeat performances:

- Die Entführung aus dem Serail. Blondchen: Stella Eisner, Osmin: Karl Norbert.
- Die Fledermaus. Eisenstein: Richard Tauber, Adele: Paula Beck.
- Ariadne auf Naxos. Conductor: Richard Strauss (on August 21); Musiklehrer/Harlekin: Karl Renner, Ariadne: Claire Born.

== See also ==
- Salzburg Festival: history and repertoire, 1935-37

== Sources ==
- Gallup, Stephen (1989). Die Geschichte der Salzburger Festspiele. Wien: Orac. ISBN 3-7015-0164-5., pp. 35–56
- Jaklitsch, Hans (1991). Die Salzburger Festspiele, Band III, Verzeichnis der Werke und der Künstler 1920-1990. Salzburg: Residenz Verlag. ISBN 3-7017-0639-5., pp. 1–8
- Kaut, Josef (1982). Die Salzburger Festspiele 1920-1981, Mit einem Verzeichnis der aufgeführten Werke und der Künstler des Theaters und der Musik von Hans Jaklitsch. Salzburg: Residenz Verlag. ISBN 3-7017-0308-6., p. 244–249.
