= Hans Duhan =

Austrian baritone (1890–1971)

External audio
- Shellac recordings with Hans Duhan in the Online Archive of the Österreichische Mediathek
- Hans Duhan sings Schubert on YouTube

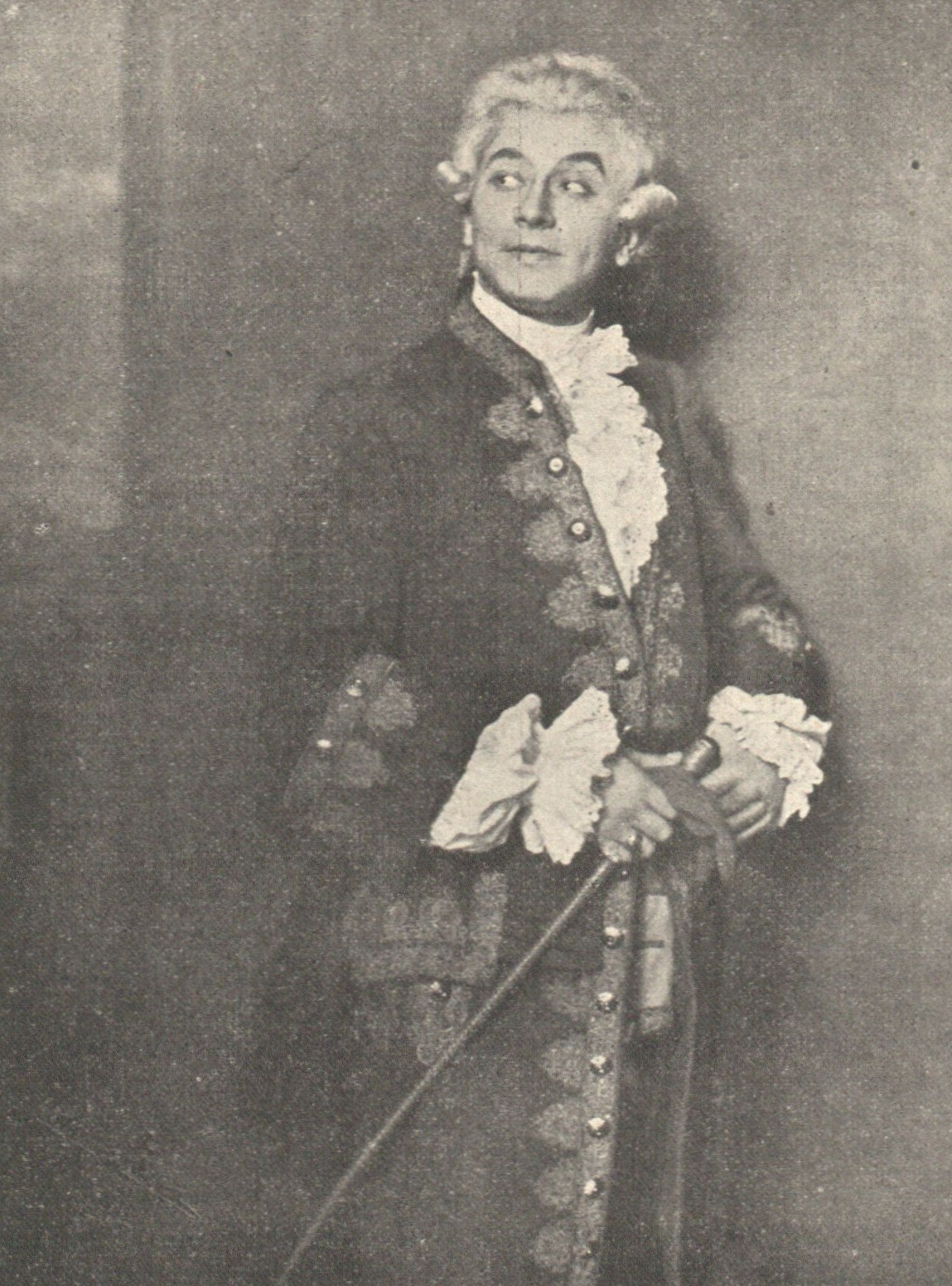
Duhan as Graf Almaviva

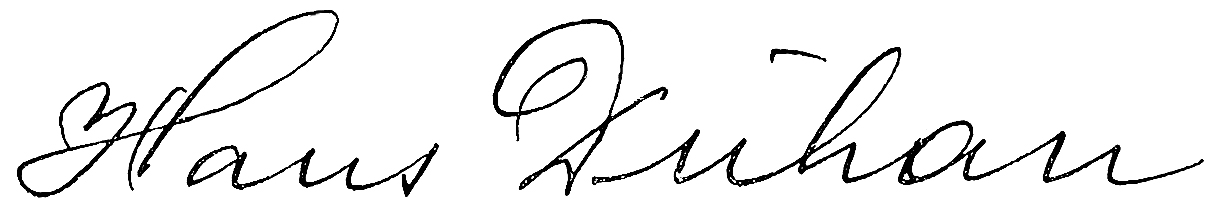

Hans Duhan (27 January 1890 – 6 March 1971) was an Austrian operatic baritone. He belonged to the ensemble of the Vienna State Opera for 26 years and was the first Count Almaviva (The Marriage of Figaro) and the first Papageno (the Magic Flute) of the Salzburg Festival.

== Life and career ==
Born in Vienna, Duhan was a "real Viennese", was born there, grew up there and completed his secondary school and his musical studies there. Besides singing with Heinrich Gottinger and Emil Steger, he studied piano, organ and music theory with Ferdinand Rebay and completed the conducting course with Franz Schalk and Felix Weingartner. With the exception of Salzburg, he rarely worked outside Vienna's city limits. Of course he made his debut at the Stadttheater of Troppau in 1910, as usual in the province at that time.

On 27 April 1914, Duhan made his debut as Amonasro in Verdi's Aida at the Wiener Hofoper. He remained a member of the institute until 1940, not only as an esteemed baritone, but later also as a director and occasionally as conductor. In the Haus am Ring, Duhan sang at least 16 times Count Almaviva in The Marriage of Figaro and 17 times Bassa Selim in Die Entführung aus dem Serail, 24 times Scarpia in Puccini's Tosca, 29 times Don Fernando in Beethoven's Fidelio and 62 times the prison director Frank in Die Fledermaus by Johann Strauss.

Duhan participated in three important world premieres: in 1916 he impersonated the music teacher and Harlequin in the new version of Ariadne auf Naxos by Hugo von Hofmannsthal and Richard Strauss. He represented the music teacher a total of 60 times, Harlequin 76 times. From 1927 on, he sang and played the violin virtuoso Daniello 21 times in Ernst Krenek's highly controversial jazz opera Jonny spielt auf. In 1934, in the premiere of Lehár's Giuditta, he took over the Duke, whom he was to perform a total of 19 times. He also took over the role of Manuele Biffi 7 times. From the end of the 1920s, Duhan was increasingly used as a director and director, he was responsible for the smooth running of several hundred evenings at the Staatsoper.

Hans Duhan also accompanied the Vienna State Opera on numerous tours to London, Paris, Stockholm, Amsterdam, Rome, Budapest, etc. In 1924, he sang the title role in Don Giovanni as well as Count Almaviva at one of these guest performances at the Paris Théâtre des Champs-Élysées in The Marriage of Figaro.

=== Salzburg Festival ===
Duhan made his debut at the Salzburg Festival as early as 1922: in the very first opera production of the festival he sang the title role three times in Mozart's Don Giovanni, at that time nobly called Don Juan, as the understudy of Alfred Jerger. He conducted Richard Strauss. His last appearance took place in 1937 at the last festival before the Anschluss, in a Liederabend together with the soprano Helen Gahagan, dedicated to "Österreichs Gegenwart im Lied". Works were sung by Josef Matthias Hauer, Hans Ewald Heller, Rudolph Reti, Joseph Marx, Alban Berg, Wilhelm Kienzl and Joseph Rinaldini. At the piano Joseph Marx and Fritz accompanied Kuba. Two of the composers had to emigrate shortly afterwards, a third (Hauer) was defamed by the National Socialists in the travelling exhibition "degenerate music".

In the 1920s and 1930s, Duhan was an important pillar of the festival – in 1922 also as the first Count Almaviva in The Marriage of Figaro, in 1926 as the first cast of Don Giovanni, as prison director Frank in Die Fledermaus and as the music teacher in Ariadne auf Naxos, in 1927 again as Almaviva and Don Giovanni, in 1928 as first Papageno of the festival, 1933 as Melot in Tristan und Isolde and as soloist in Brahms' Deutsches Requiem, and from 1934 to 1936 again as Melot. As early as 1926 he was to perform a lieder recital, but this had to be cancelled due to indisposition.

=== Lieder recitals and oratorios ===
Duhan gave a series of lieder recitals, mainly singing works by Franz Schubert, Franz Liszt, Carl Loewe and Richard Strauss. Numerous audio documents of his song interpretations are available. He was the first singer to record all three song cycles of Franz Schubert – namely Die schöne Müllerin, Winterreise and the Schwanengesang. This was realized in 1928 for His Master's Voice. He also endeavoured to produce works by contemporary composers; in addition to the composers mentioned in the Salzburg Liederabend, he also interpreted works by Erich Zeisl who was later forced to emigrate.

His Christ in Bach's St Matthew Passion signaled him above all as an oratorio singer.

=== Singing teacher ===
From the 1931/32 season until 1955 Duhan worked as a teacher of opera drama at the Vienna Music Academy. He trained numerous baritones, bass baritones and basses of the following generation, among them Hans Braun, Ernst Gutstein, Erich Kunz, Peter Lagger, Hermann Uhde and Otto Wiener, as well as the tenor Waldemar Kmentt.

=== Composer and conductor ===
- Mozart. A singspiel in two acts and an epilogue, libretto by Julius Wilhelm and Paul Frank (screenwriter). Gabor Steiner Verlag, Wien/Leipzig 1923. World premiere on 2 June 1923, Vienna Volksoper.

Occasionally he also stood on the podium of the Vienna Philharmonic: once each time he conducted the Der fliegende Holländer and Lohengrin, twice Verdi's Rigoletto and five times Puccini's Tosca.

== Miscellaneous ==
From 1934 to 1938 Duhan was a member of the Federal Cultural Council as a representative of the art group, designed programmes for "patriotic events" and was closely associated with Ernst Rüdiger Starhemberg and the Heimwehr.

In 1919 Wilhelm Kienzl dedicated his Op. 96 to him. Aus des Volkes Wunderhorn. A collection of fifteen folk poems, set to music for a middle voice with piano accompaniment by Wilhelm Kienzl. Dedicated to Hans Duhan in the highest artistic esteem.

Duhan, who was married to Erilda (Eri), née Strell (7 March 1894 – 14 July 1962) died in Munich. Both graves are located at the Hietzing Cemetery.

== Awards ==
- 1926: Appointment as Kammersänger (3 July).
