= Hans Braun (baritone) =

Austrian opera singer (1917–1992)

- Born: 14 May 1917; Vienna, Austria-Hungary
- Died: 2 May 1992 (aged 74); Vienna, Austria
- Burial place: Vienna Central Cemetery
- Occupation: baritone
- Organizations: Vienna State Opera
- Awards: Austrian Decoration for Science and Art

Hans Braun (14 May 1917 – 2 May 1992) was an Austrian operatic baritone. He was a long-term member of the Vienna State Opera and appeared in leading roles such as Mozart's Count Almaviva and Wagner's Wolfram, including in major European opera houses and festivals.

== Life ==
Born in Vienna, Braun was a member of the Peterlini-Sängerknaben in his hometown. He studied voice at the Wiener Musikakademie with Hermann Gallos and Hans Duhan. He made his debut in 1938. From 1943 to 1945 he had an engagement at the Stadttheater Königsberg in today's Kaliningrad. From 1945, he was a member of the Vienna State Opera, to which he belonged until 1979. After singing secondary roles in the beginning, he soon advanced to leading roles, performing 75 roles there. At the Salzburg Festival, he first appeared as a concert singer, then in 1949 and 1950 as the Minister in Beethoven's Fidelio, in 1950 also as Olivier in Capriccio by Richard Strauss and Tarquinius in Benjamin Britten's The Rape of Lucretia.

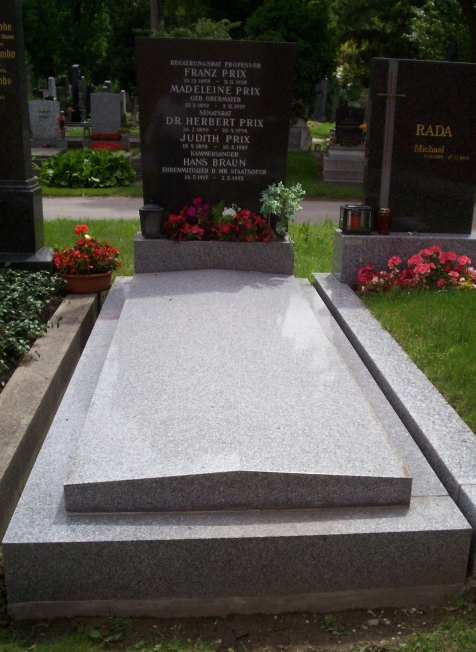
Braun's grave, Vienna Central Cemetery

Braun made guest appearances at many European opera houses. He appeared at the Royal Opera House in London as Count Almaviva in Mozart's Le nozze di Figaro in 1949 and as Orest in Elektra by Richard Strauss in 1953, which he also sang at the Maggio Musicale Fiorentino that year. In 1950, he performed as Wolfram in Wagner's Tannhaüser at La Scala in Milan. He appeared also in Naples, Berlin, Munich, and Hamburg, and at the Bayreuth Festival, where he performed the role of the Heerrufer in Lohengrin.

Braun was briefly married to his colleague Dagmar Hermann.

Braun died in Vienna at age 74. He was buried at the Vienna Central Cemetery.

== Honours ==
- 1977: Honorary member of the Vienna State Opera
