= Waldemar Kmentt =

Austrian opera singer

Waldemar Kmentt (Vienna, 2 February 1929 – Vienna, 21 January 2015) was an Austrian operatic tenor, who was particularly associated with the German repertory, both opera and operetta.

Born in Vienna, Kmentt studied at the Vienna Music Academy, first the piano, and later voice with Adolf Vogel, Elisabeth Radó and Hans Duhan. In 1950, he sang the tenor-solo part in Beethoven's Ninth Symphony under Karl Böhm. His professional opera debut was in 1951 at the Vienna State Opera, where he played the Prince in The Love for Three Oranges. He appeared regularly at the Staatsoper for the next 35 years, in a total of 1,480 performances, and the company awarded him honorary membership in 1982. His Salzburg Festival debut was in 1955 in Hans Pfitzner's Palestrina, as Dandini. Other roles at Salzburg Festival particularly include Mozart roles (Belmonte, Don Ottavio, Ferrando, Tamino, and both Idamante and Idomeneo).

Beginning in 1956, he appeared outside Austria, in places such as Milan, Rome, Paris, Amsterdam, Brussels, Teatro Colón in Buenos Aires, Berlin, and Munich (Idomeneo, Jenůfa, Die Frau ohne Schatten, and Les contes d'Hoffmann (The Tales of Hoffmann). He made his debut at the Bayreuth Festival, as Walther von Stolzing in Wagner's Die Meistersinger von Nürnberg, in 1968. He also appeared regularly at the Vienna Volksoper in operetta, notably Die Fledermaus.

Other notable roles included Jacquino, Erik, Bacchus, The Emperor. He also sang a few Italian roles with success such as Rodolfo, des Grieux, Ruggero, etc. In 1960, he created Gabriel in Frank Martin's Le Mystère de la Nativité. Kmentt continued to sing into his sixties, in character roles such as Triquet in Eugene Onegin, the Innkeeper in Der Rosenkavalier and Altoum in Turandot, while teaching at the Vienna Music Academy. His final Vienna State Opera performance was on 25 November 2005 as the Haushofmeister in Ariadne auf Naxos.

Kmentt is featured on such recordings as Herbert von Karajan's version of Beethoven's ninth symphony (1963), the Georg Solti Decca/London Records recordings of Arabella (1957) as Elemer, Das Rheingold (1958) as Froh, Tristan und Isolde (1960) as the Young Sailor, and Salome (1961) as Narraboth. He also recorded Narraboth under Rudolf Moralt in 1952 for Philips (Columbia in the U.S.) and sang the role in Vienna in 1972 under Karl Böhm in a live performance that later appeared on RCA and some "pirate" labels.
