= Die Frau ohne Schatten =

Opera by Richard Strauss

- Opera by Richard Strauss
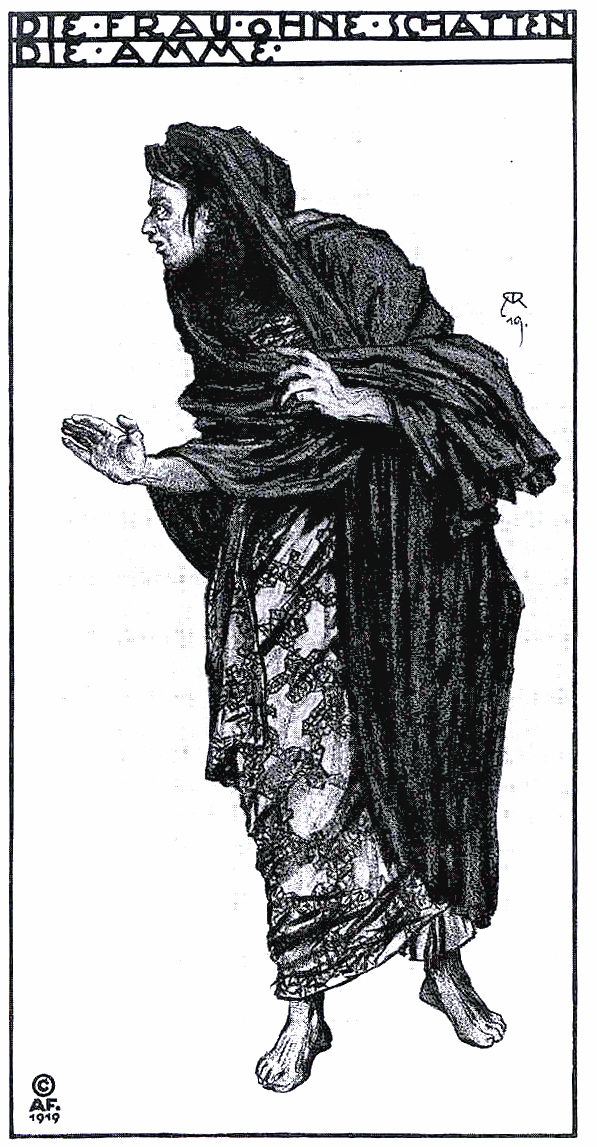
- Costume design by Alfred Roller for the premiere, for the role of the Nurse
- Translation: The Woman without a Shadow
- Librettist: Hugo von Hofmannsthal
- Language: German
- Based on: The German Refugees by Goethe
- Premiere: 10 October 1919; Vienna State Opera

Die Frau ohne Schatten (The Woman without a Shadow), Op. 65, is an opera in three acts by Richard Strauss with a libretto by his long-time collaborator, the poet Hugo von Hofmannsthal. It was written between 1914 and 1917. When it premiered at the Vienna State Opera on 10 October 1919, critics and audiences were unenthusiastic. Many cited problems with Hofmannsthal's complicated and heavily symbolic libretto. However, it is now a standard part of the operatic repertoire.

== Composition history ==
Work on the opera began in 1914. Hofmannsthal's earliest sketches for the libretto are based on a piece from Goethe's collection The German Refugees (1795). Hofmannsthal handles Goethe's material freely, adding the idea of two couples, the emperor and empress who come from another realm, and the dyer and his wife who belong to the ordinary world. Hofmannsthal also drew on portions of The Arabian Nights, Grimms' Fairy Tales, and even quotes Goethe's Faust. The opera is conceived as a fairy tale on the theme of love blessed through the birth of children. Hofmannsthal, in his letters, compared it with Mozart's Magic Flute, which has a similar arrangement of two couples.

Strauss began composing immediately. He and Hofmannsthal worked on music and words in parallel, each receiving inspiration from the other. Strauss was happy with Hofmannsthal's text, but asked him to rewrite many passages for the sake of dramatic effect. Hofmannsthal was adamantly opposed and was more worried about the symbolism beneath his libretto. The opera was finished in 1917, during the First World War, but had to wait for its premiere until 1919. The sometimes difficult genesis of the opera is documented in their correspondence.

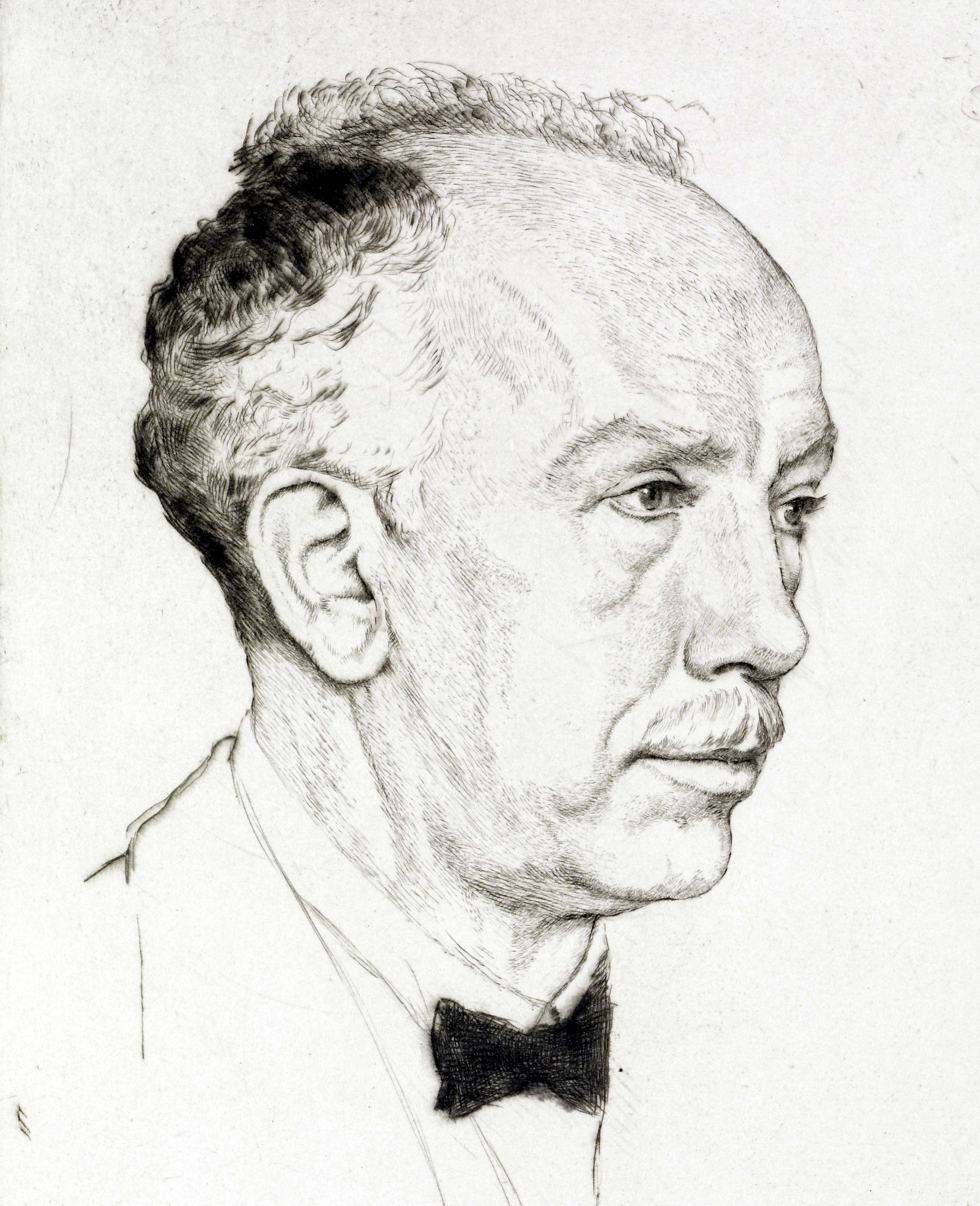
Strauss in 1917, portrait by Emil Orlík

Strauss himself called this opera his "child of woe", even nicknaming it Die FroSch ("Frosch" means "frog" in German), that is "Die Frau ohne Schatten"). The complexity of the text and the stress of wartime made its composition a laborious task, and Strauss was also disappointed with the first productions.

Musically, Die Frau ohne Schatten is one of Strauss's most complicated and colorful scores. In contrast to the quickly-moving Salome and Elektra, it includes extended monologues and scenes. The opera remains a challenge to stage, even for a major opera house, calling as it does for five top soloists in the demanding principal roles, first rate secondary roles, a large orchestra, and elaborate sets and scenic effects.

Scenically, it is also demanding, with all the scene changes and special effects. Children singing out of a frying pan is particularly demanding, as is the final golden waterfall scene. Few opera houses are capable of staging the work.

In 1946 Strauss created a one-movement orchestral piece, Fantasy on Die Frau ohne Schatten, based on highlights from the opera. It was premiered in Vienna in 1947.

Writing about Die Frau ohne Schatten in 1948, Strauss said, despite the difficulties of staging it, "it has succeeded nevertheless and has made a deep impression ... and music lovers in particular consider it to be my most important work."

== Roles ==
Roles, voice types, premiere cast
Role	Voice type	Premiere cast, 10 October 1919 Conductor: Franz Schalk
The Emperor (Der Kaiser)	heldentenor	Karl Aagaard Østvig
The Empress (Die Kaiserin), Keikobad's daughter	dramatic coloratura soprano	Maria Jeritza
The Nurse (Die Amme), her guardian	dramatic mezzo-soprano	Lucie Weidt
Barak, the Dyer (Barak, der Färber)	bass-baritone	Richard Mayr
The Dyer's Wife (Die Färberin)	high dramatic soprano	Lotte Lehmann
The One-eyed Man (Der Einäugige), Barak's brother	high bass	Viktor Madin
The One-Armed Man (Der Einarmige), Barak's brother	bass	Julius Betetto
The Hunchback (Der Bucklige), Barak's brother	high tenor	Anton Arnold
The Messenger of Keikobad (Geisterbote)	high baritone	Josef von Manowarda
The Voice of a Falcon (Die Stimme des Falken)	soprano	Felicie Hüni-Mihacsek
The Apparition of a Youth (Die Erscheinung eines Jünglings)	high tenor	
The Guardian of the Threshold (Der Hüter der Schwelle des Tempels)	soprano	Sybilla Blei
A Voice From Above (Stimme von oben)	contralto	Maria Olczewska
Voices of Six Unborn Children, Voices of Three Town Watchmen, Servants of the Empress, other children and beggar-children, spirit-servants and spirit-voices

The role of the Empress calls for a dramatic soprano who can support a very high tessitura and negotiate an act 1 entrance aria including coloratura passages, a trill, and a high D. Similarly, any tenor attempting the Emperor must be able to handle numerous passages in his uppermost range, particularly his extended solo scene in act 2. The Nurse's role makes some demands on the singer's lower range but also requires frequent leaps above the staff. The Dyer's Wife also calls for a soprano with immense sound to be heard over heavily orchestrated passages. The Dyer is the most approachable of the leading vocal parts, but again the orchestration is very heavy and requires a baritone with sufficient stamina to last the opera's three hours and fifteen minutes.

== Synopsis ==
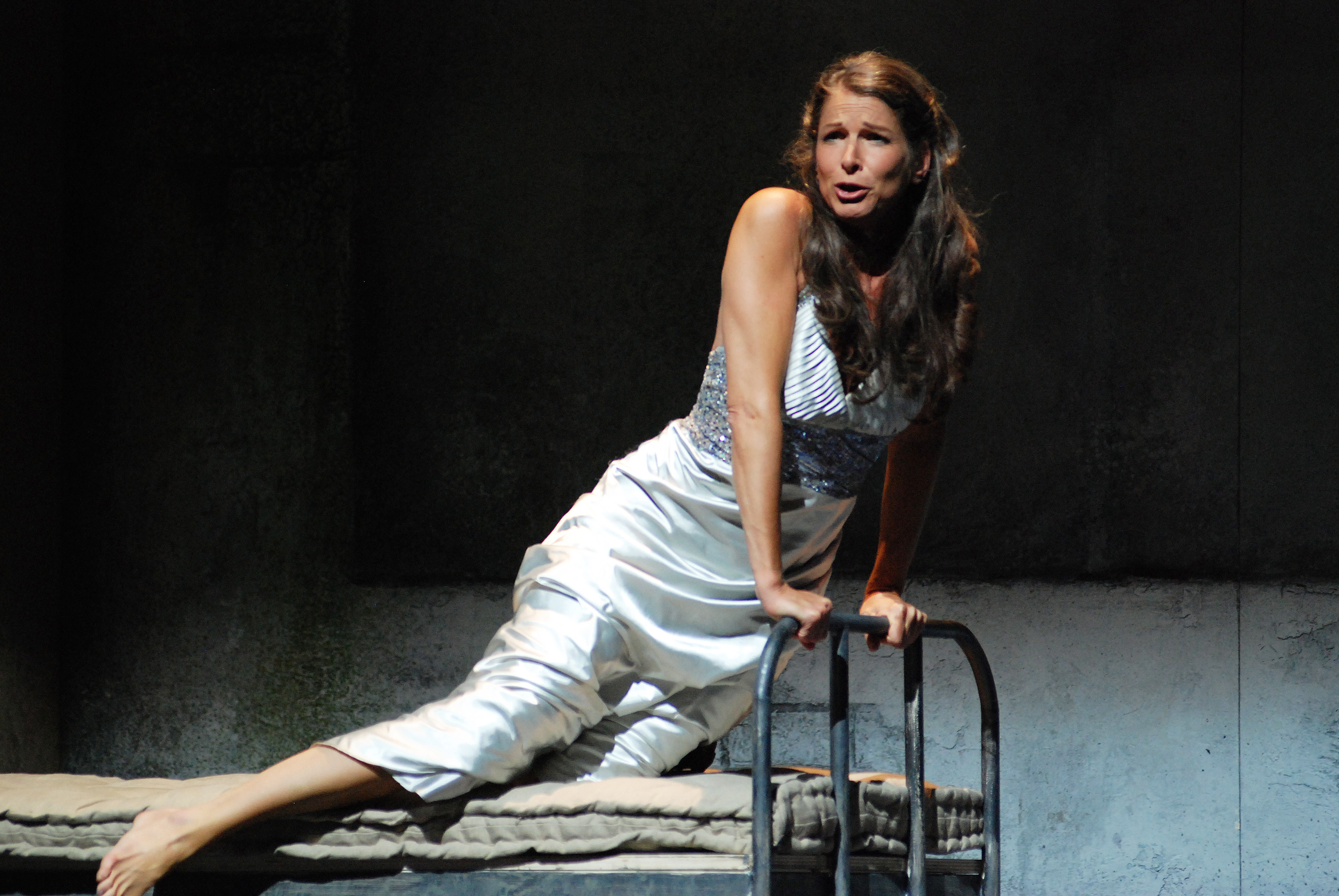
Nicola Beller Carbone as The Dyer's Wife, Hessisches Staatstheater Wiesbaden, 2014

The opera's story is set in the mythical empire of the Southeastern Islands and involves five principal characters: the Emperor (tenor), the Empress (soprano), her Nurse (mezzo-soprano), Barak, a lowly dyer (bass-baritone), and the Dyer's Wife (dramatic soprano). A sixth character, Keikobad, King of the Spirit Realm and father to the Empress, sets the plot in motion, but never appears on stage. The Empress is half human: she was captured by the Emperor in the form of a gazelle. She assumed human shape and he married her, but she has no shadow. This symbolizes her inability to bear children. Keikobad has decreed that unless the Empress gains a shadow before one year elapses after her human marriage, he will reclaim her as his daughter and the Emperor will turn to stone.

=== Act 1 ===
Scene 1

It is dawn, outside the bedchambers of the Emperor and Empress. The Messenger of Keikobad arrives, and tells the Empress's nurse that the Empress must acquire a shadow within three days, or she will be forcibly returned to his realm, and the Emperor turned to stone. The Nurse is excited about the prospect of returning to the spirit world, since she hates humans and having to dwell with them.

The Messenger leaves and the Emperor emerges from his bedchamber. He departs on a three-day hunting trip, seeking his favorite falcon, which he drove away for attacking a gazelle that later turned into the Empress. He leaves his wife to the Nurse's care. The Empress emerges from her chamber and reminisces about times when she had the ability to turn into any creature she wanted.

It is revealed that after being attacked by the red falcon that the Emperor is seeking, she lost a talisman that gave transformation powers, and on which was inscribed a curse that foresaw the fate she and the Emperor are about to face if she does not acquire a shadow. The red falcon appears and warns the Empress that the curse is about to be fulfilled. The Empress begs the Nurse to help her get a shadow. The Nurse, who is steeped in magic, suggests descending to the mortal world and finding a woman who will sell her shadow to the Empress.

Scene 2

Barak, a dyer, shares his hut with his Wife and his three brothers: the One-Eyed Man, the One-Armed Man, and the Hunchback. The three brothers fight about a stolen item and are separated by the Wife, who throws a bucket of water at them. The three brothers then argue with the Wife. Barak enters and stops the argument. The Wife wants to have her brothers-in-laws thrown out, but her husband refuses.

The Dyer desires children, but his Wife fears the responsibility and has secretly sworn not to have any. The Dyer and his brothers leave, and the Empress and the Nurse arrive in disguise. The Nurse conjures up visions of luxury and promises them to the Wife in return for her shadow. The Wife agrees to deny her husband for three days, during which the Nurse and the Empress will live at the Dyer's hut as poor relatives who have come to work as servants.

Barak approaches and the Wife is worried that dinner is not ready. The Nurse uses her magic to have dinner ready, and also splits the couple's bed into two single beds, separating them with a curtain. The Nurse and Empress disappear, and the Wife is greatly upset by the offstage Voices of Unborn Children lamenting, which emerge from the fish that are cooking on the fire. The Dyer returns to find he is barred from his marital bed. The Wife informs him of the impending stay of her "cousins" and goes off to her separate bed. From outside, the Town Watchmen are heard singing of the importance of conjugal love. Barak sighs and lies down to sleep on the floor.

=== Act 2 ===
Scene 1

The Empress, acting as a servant, helps the Dyer leave for work, but is troubled by her role, because Barak is very kind to her. The Nurse conjures up the image of a handsome youth by bringing a broom to life, which tempts the Dyer's Wife. The Dyer returns with his hungry brothers and a throng of beggar children. He has had a magnificent day at the market, selling all his goods, and has invited everyone to celebrate. However, his Wife manages to ruin the celebration by refusing to eat the food he has brought home.

Scene 2

The Emperor is led to his hunting lodge in the forest by the red falcon. He sees the Empress and Nurse surreptitiously enter the lodge, and is suspicious. When he comes closer, he smells a human odor trailing the Empress. Thinking she has betrayed him, he resolves to kill her. He first thinks of using an arrow, and then his sword, and then his bare hands. Finally he realizes he can't do it. He resolves to seek out some isolated ravine to be alone with his misery.

Scene 3

At the Dyer's house, the Dyer is drugged into sleep by the Nurse. The Nurse again conjures up the young man for the Wife, who grows frightened and rouses the Dyer. Barak is surprised to learn that there is a man in his house but then is quickly turned upon by his Wife, who shouts at him, then leaves for the city, leaving her confused husband. Left alone with Barak, the Empress feels guiltier than before.

Scene 4

The Empress goes to sleep at the hunting lodge, but in her sleep she is further troubled by her crime and by the possible fate of the Emperor. In a dream, she sees the Emperor enter her father's realm. Unseen choruses chant the curse of the talisman. Awakening, she is overcome with guilt and remorse.

Scene 5

The next day, the Wife announces that she has sold her shadow. When a fire reveals that she has no shadow, the enraged Barak is ready to kill her. The Empress cries out that she no longer wants the shadow. A sword appears in the Dyer's hand. His brothers restrain him as the Wife declares her remorse and urges Barak to kill her. An earthquake splits the ground and Barak and his wife are swallowed into the earth. The brothers flee, and the Nurse, recognizing Keikobad's hand, spirits the Empress away.

=== Act 3 ===
Scene 1

In a grotto beneath the realm of Keikobad, the Wife and the Dyer are seen in separate chambers, unaware of the other's presence. The Wife is haunted by the Voices of Unborn Children. She protests that she loves the Dyer, who regrets his attempted violence. A voice directs them up separate staircases.

Scene 2

The Empress and Nurse arrive before Keikobad's temple. The Nurse tries to convince the Empress to escape but she remembers the doors from her dream and knows that her father is waiting for her on the other side. She dismisses the Nurse and enters. The Nurse foretells terrible tortures awaiting the Empress and misleads the Wife and Barak, who are looking for each other, she to die at her husband's hand, he to forgive her and hold her in his arms. Keikobad's Messenger condemns the Nurse to wander the mortal world.

Scene 3

Inside the Temple, the Empress speaks to Keikobad, asking for forgiveness and to find her place amongst those who cast shadows. Keikobad does not answer but shows the Emperor already almost petrified. The Fountain of Life springs up before the Empress, and a temple guardian urges her to drink from it and claim the Wife's shadow for herself. But the Dyer and the Wife are heard offstage, and the Empress refuses to steal their future happiness and become human by robbing humanity from someone else: "Ich will nicht!" ("I will not!"). This act of renunciation frees her: she receives a shadow, and the Emperor is restored to natural form.

Scene 4

The scene changes to a beautiful landscape. Barak and his Wife are reunited and she regains her own shadow. Both couples sing of their humanity and praise their Unborn Children.

== Instrumentation ==
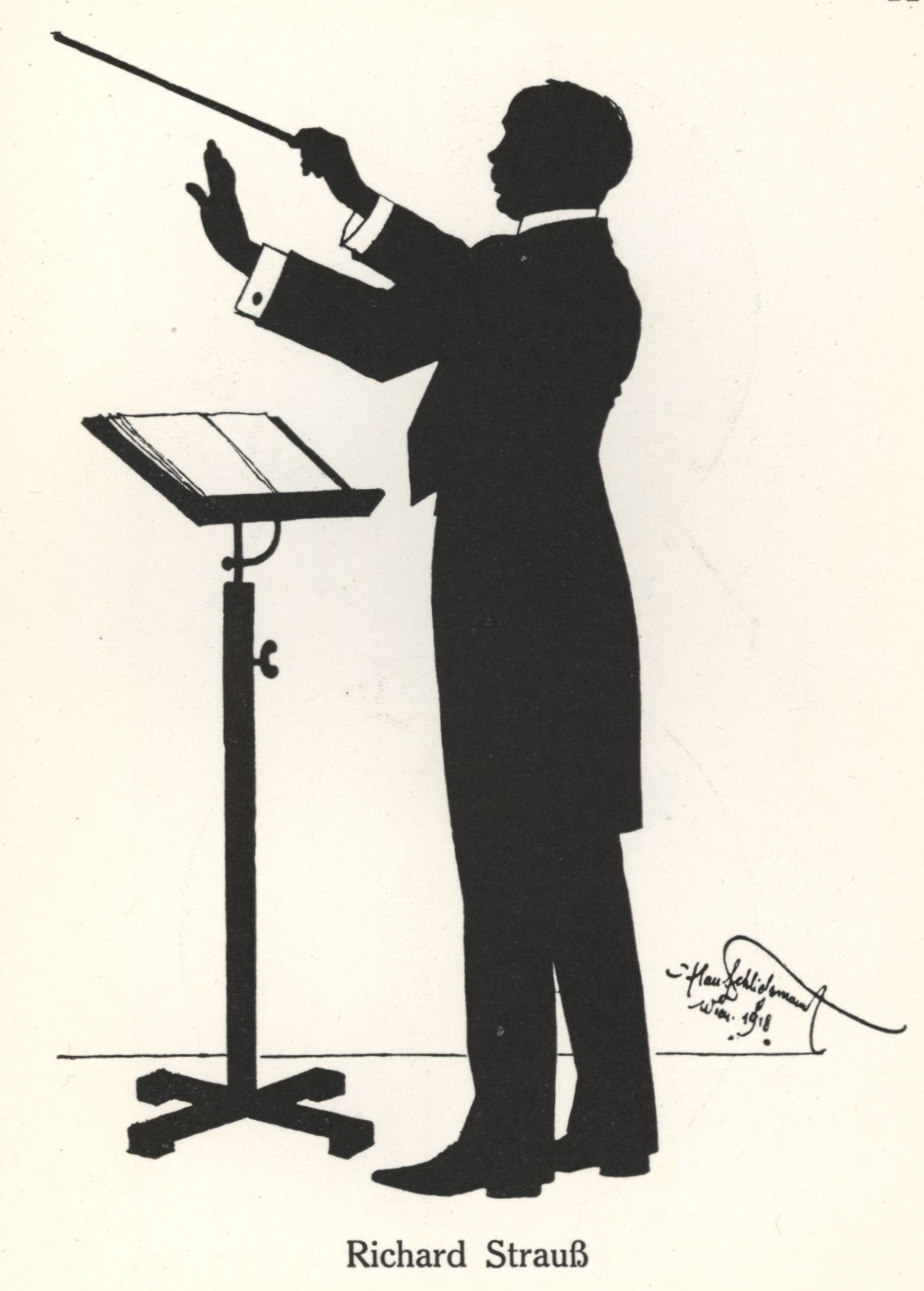
Strauss by Hans Schliesmann, 1918

The opulent 164 piece instrumentation includes:

- woodwind: 4 flutes, 2 piccolos, 3 oboes, English horn, E♭ clarinet, D clarinet, 2 clarinets in B♭, 2 clarinets in C, basset horn, bass clarinet in B♭, 4 bassoons, contrabassoon
- brass: 8 French horns, 4 Wagner tubas, 4 trumpets, 4 trombones, bass tuba
- percussion: glass harmonica, 4 timpani, 5 pitched Chinese gongs, 1 pair of crash cymbals, suspended cymbal, snare drum, rute, 1 set of sleigh bells, bass drum, large tenor drum, triangle, tambourine, 2 pairs of castanets, tam-tam (gong), whip (slapstick), big field drum, xylophone, glockenspiel, 2 celestas
- strings: 16 1st violins, 16 2nd violins, 6 1st violas, 6 2nd violas, 6 1st cellos, 6 2nd cellos, 8 double basses, 2 harps
- stage orchestra: 2 flutes, oboe, 2 clarinets in C, bassoon, French horn, 6 trumpets, 6 trombones, wind machine, thunder sheet, organ, 4 tam-tams (gongs) (Two of the on-stage trumpets move to the pit for act 3, thus in total 10 trumpets are required.)

== Historical sources of the libretto ==
For the name of the opera, see The Woman Who Had No Shadow.

Hofmannsthal was inspired by the fairy tale by Wilhelm Hauff, "The Cold Heart".

Keikobad is a variant spelling of the name of the Sasanian king Kovad and the mythical Iranian king Kai Kobad from the Kayanian dynasty in the Shahnameh (book of kings) by Ferdowsi. There are other references to Iranian mythology in the story, such as the trial of fire and the fountain of life, which are present in Shahnameh.
