= Peterlini =

Peterlini is an Italian surname. Notable people with the surname include:

- Dominik Peterlini (1875–1944), Austrian musician and choral conductor
- Hans Karl Peterlini (born 1961), Austrian author, journalist, university professor and educational researcher
- Martina Peterlini (born 1997), Italian World Cup alpine ski racer
- Oskar Peterlini (born 1950), Italian political writer and lecturer
