= Liselotte Maikl =

Austrian soprano and ballett dancer

Liselotte Maikl (6 March 1925 – 10 December 2014) was an Austrian soprano and ballet dancer.

== Life ==
Born in Vienna, Maikl was the daughter of the tenor Georg Maikl (1872–1951) and a ballet dancer. At the age of seven she joined the Ballet Academy of the Vienna State Opera and was a member of the Vienna State Ballet. In addition to her ballet training, she also studied singing with Maria Gerhart and received dramatic lessons at the University of Music and Performing Arts Vienna.

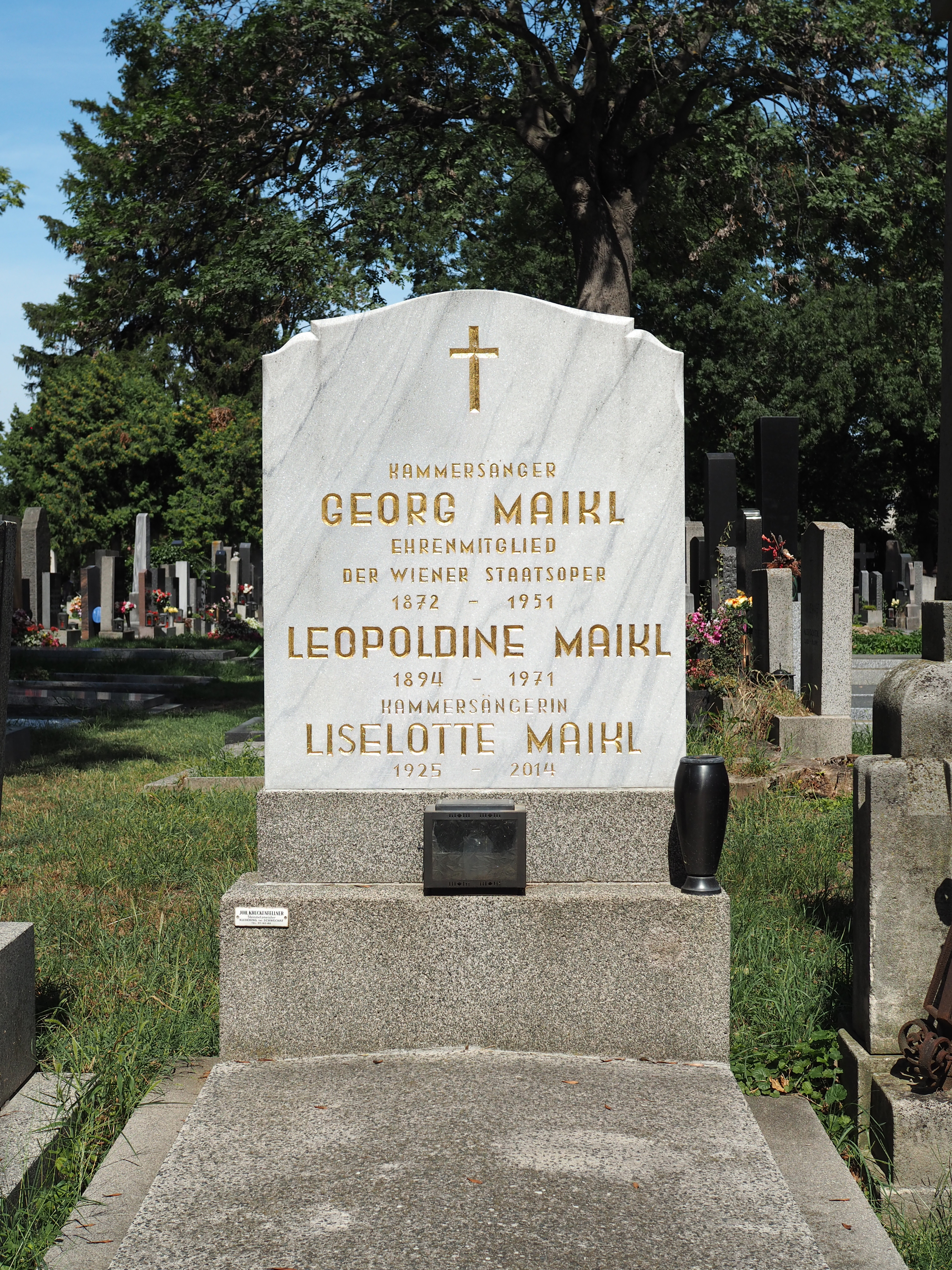
Grave of Liselotte Maikl and her father Georg Maikl in the Vienna Central Cemetery

With her father she was on stage at the Der Vogelhändler as Christel. From 1948 to 1950, she was engaged as a singer at the Landestheater Linz, then at the Volksoper Wien. From 1951, she was a member of the ensemble of the Vienna State Opera. She made her State Opera debut on 19 May 1951 as one of the four Edelknaben in Wagner's Lohengrin. After the opera building was destroyed in bombing raids in March 1945, the rehearsals and performances were held at the Theater an der Wien until its reopening in 1955. At the Salzburger Festspiele, she appeared as Barbarina in Mozart's Le nozze di Figaro in 1953 and 1960, and in Verdi's Don Carlos in 1960. With the Wiener Solistenorchester under the direction of Karl Grell, she made television appearances as an operetta and Wienerlied singer. She said her farewell to the State Opera on 13 December 1978 in Wagner's Die Walküre. In total she played 66 different roles in 1206 performances.

In 1974 she was awarded the title Österreichische Kammersängerin.

Maikl died on 10 December 2014 at the age of 89 in the artists' home in Baden near Vienna, where she was a member of the board of the association Künstler helfen Künstler and spent her last years. She was buried at her father's side in the Vienna Central Cemetery (Group 33A/5/17).

== Awards ==
- Österreichisches Ehrenzeichen für Wissenschaft und Kunst.
- Goldene Ehrenmedaille der Bundeshauptstadt Wien.
