= Harry Stangenberg =

Swedish opera director

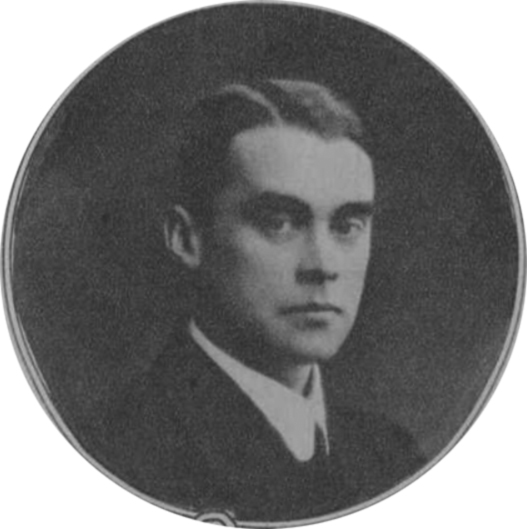
Harry Stangenberg

Harry Stangenberg (21 April 1893 – 3 November 1941) was a Swedish opera director and from 1927 the head of the Staatstheater Stuttgart. He was expelled by the National Socialists in 1933.

== Life and career ==
Born in Stockholm, the son of August Emil Stangenberg, an otolaryngologist (1860–1950), Stangenberg graduated from the Stockholm School of Economics, but then turned to opera. He completed his apprenticeship from 1913 to 1916 as a volunteer at the Royal Swedish Opera of Stockholm, as assistant director to Max Reinhardt in Berlin and at the Bavarian State Opera. Afterwards followed first productions in Bern, Frankfurt and in Riga. In 1919, he was engaged as house director at the Royal Opera in Stockholm, where he successfully staged operas from the Baroque to the present day, including Gluck's Iphigénie en Tauride, der Rosenkavalier by Hugo von Hofmannsthal and Richard Strauss, Die toten Augen by Eugen d’Albert, Die Kronbraut by Strindberg and Ture Rangström as well as Mona Lisa by Max von Schillings on a libretto by Beatrice Dovsky.

In 1922 was the year in which the Salzburg Festival first had opera performances on its programme. Four Mozart operas were shown, including the marriage of Figaro in a production by Harry Stangenberg and Hans Breuer. From 1 August 1927, Stangenberg was head of the Staatstheater Stuttgart, appointed at the suggestion of the general director Albert Kehm. Kehm knew him from Bern. Stangenberg took over half of the ten new productions each year and gave the programme a distinctive profile. The emphasis was on contemporary works on the one hand and highly interesting rediscoveries on the other. The latter category included, for example, Nerone by Arrigo Boito, La Juive by Jacques Fromental Halévy and Rusalka by Antonín Dvořák. In the category of period operas, one could include Stravinsky's Histoire du soldat, Hindemith's Cardillac, Krenek's Jonny spielt auf or the two short operas Der Protagonist and Der Zar lässt sich photographieren by Georg Kaiser and Kurt Weill.

On 20 November 1930, a xenophobic and anti-Semitic orgy of verbal hatred poured out against the director, who was accused of staging "foreign and Jewish operas generously with German money". Published in the Völkischer Beobachter, the text included the question, "How much longer?" The month before, hate articles had already appeared against the premiere of the comedy Shadows over Harlem by Osip Dymow. Kehr and Stangenberg then abandoned the innovative playbill policy in anticipation of "the calming of political conditions". However, the situation did not calm down and the planned performances of Berg's Wozzeck, Weinberger's The Outcasts of Poker Flat as well as Rise and Fall of the City of Mahagonny by Bertolt Brecht and Kurt Weill did not take place, although some of the performance rights had already been acquired. The question "How much longer?" was answered by the new Nazi director Otto Kraus, who gave notice at the end of March 1933 and cynically recommended that the director should apply "to Berlin theatres". The expulsion of the spirit from Germany was in full swing. Stangenberg left the country on 12 July 1933. He went back to Sweden and worked again as a freelance director. In 1938, he was appointed head director of the Royal Opera of Stockholm. In the 1936 film Flowers from Nice '1936) he acted as a musical director.

He died in 1941 at the age of 48 in Stockholm's Engelbrekt Parish and was buried at Norra begravningsplatsen.
