= Maria Olszewska =

German opera singer

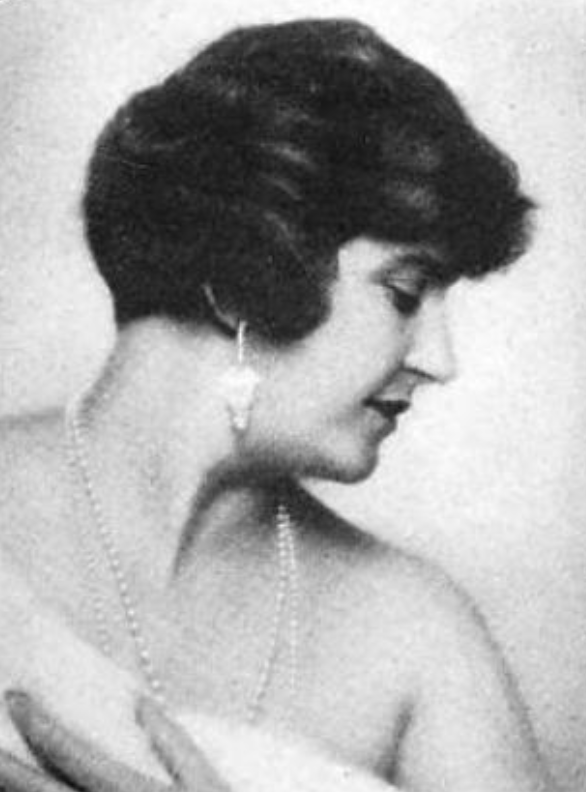
- Maria Olszewska from a 1927 publication
- Born: 12 August 1892; Germany
- Died: 17 May 1969 (aged 76); Germany
- Other names: Marie Berchtenbreitner
- Occupation: Opera singer

Maria Olszewska (Olczewska, also Marie Berchtenbreitner; 12 August 1892 – 17 May 1969) was a German operatic dramatic contralto.

== Biography ==
Olszewska was born in Ludwigsschwaige, Germany. She studied singing in Munich with Karl Erler for three years before beginning her career singing in operettas in that city in 1913. She made her first opera appearance in 1915 as the Page in Richard Wagner's Tannhäuser at the opera house in Krefeld, where she already had a two-year contract. Arthur Nikisch attempted to secure her services. Soon after she was engaged at the Oper Leipzig up through 1919.

Olszewska left Leipzig to join the Hamburg State Opera, where she was engaged from 1919 to 1922. While there, she notably portrayed Brigitta/Lucienne in the world co-premiere of Erich Wolfgang Korngold's Die tote Stadt on 4 December 1920. While singing in Hamburg, she was appointed to the roster of artists at the Vienna State Opera (VSO) in 1921 where she sang through 1923. She was a member of the Bavarian State Opera in Munich from 1923 to 1925, after which she returned to the VSO from 1925 to 1930. In 1925, she married the baritone Emil Schipper (1882–1957).

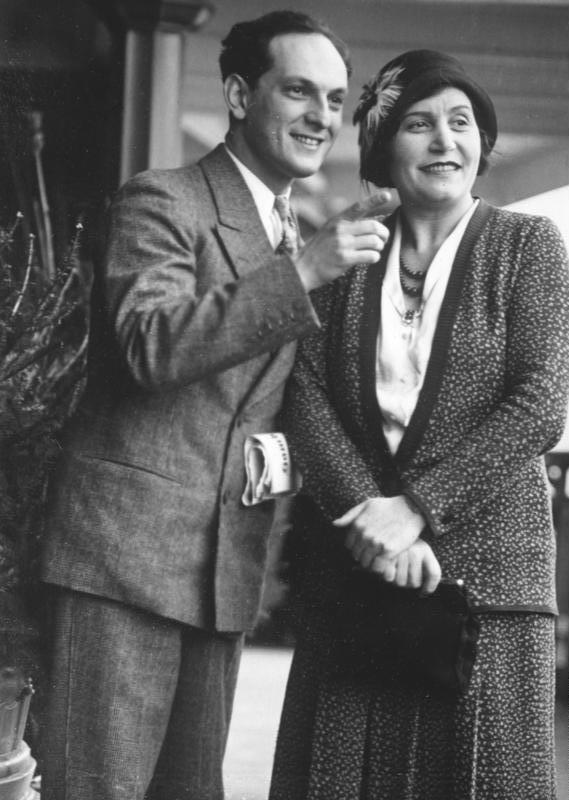
Actor Joseph Schildkraut with Maria Olszewska in 1932

Olszewska appeared frequently as a guest artist at opera houses around the world. In 1923 and 1928 she was heard as a guest at the Teatro Colón in Buenos Aires. She made numerous appearance at the Royal Opera, London between 1924 and 1932, where her performances in such roles as Fricka, Ortrud, Brangäne and Herodias drew the highest critical acclaim. Her Carmen and Amneris were less successful, but her Octavian and Orlofsky were highly regarded. In the United States, she sang in Chicago (1928–1932) and at the Metropolitan Opera. She also gave performances at La Scala, La Monnaie, and highly successful tours in South and Central America.

From 1947, Olszewska taught at the University of Music and Performing Arts, Vienna and in 1948 she became a lecturer at the Vienna State Opera. From 1951 to 1955, she again appeared at the Vienna Volksoper, singing roles like Agricola in Johann Strauss II's A Night in Venice. She retired from the stage in 1955, after which she devoted her time to teaching. She died in Klagenfurt.

== Recordings ==
Olszewska is best known for her Octavian in the 1932 abridged recording of Der Rosenkavalier, conducted by Robert Heger, with Lotte Lehmann as the Marschalin, Elisabeth Schumann as Sophie, and Richard Mayr as Baron Ochs.

== Sources ==
- Bach Contatas.com
