= Erik Wirl =

German operatic tenor

Erik Wirl (30 May 1884 – 15 February 1954) was a German operatic tenor and actor.

== Life ==
Born in Ebensee, Wirl left his voice training with the court and chamber singer Eduard F. Schuegraf in Munich. (Note: Baritone Eduard Schuegraf (6 December 1851 in Munich - 14 December 1928 id.) and worked as a concert singer there after his training. After further studies he was engaged at the Munich Court Opera in 1882/83. He also sang at the theater in Nuremberg, where he gave a song recital on 3 May 1888 as a farewell performance. From 1889 to 1890 he was engaged at the Mecklenburg State Theatre. Besides, he worked as a singing teacher. Cf. NKL 1/2007, vol. 3."Picture of Schuegraf". Archived from the original on April 7, 2014. can be seen here.) First classified as a baritone, he later changed his voice range to that of tenor. He debuted in the role of the young sailor in Wagner's Tristan und Isolde. He then performed as a tenor opera singer in Bayreuth, Berlin, Budapest, Buenos Aires, The Hague, Frankfurt/Main, Cologne, Leipzig, Munich, Paris, Salzburg and Vienna.

Wirl also sang operettas and entertainment songs - often in duet with renowned colleagues of his time. Wirl also sang the hits of the still young sound film the Viennese song Ja dort im Liebhardstal and the title song Wien, du Stadt der Lieder by Hans May.

In his work, special emphasis was placed on the works of Franz Schreker. Wirl sang the role of the Chevalier at the premieres of his operas Der ferne Klang on 18 August 1912 and Die Gezeichneten on 25 April 1918 the role of Menaldo Negroni and created the figure of the jester in Der Schatzgräber. In Busoni's opera Turandot he sang in 1918 under Gustav Brecher at the Oper Frankfurt next to Else Gentner-Fischer and Hans Ertl. At the world premiere of Delius' opera in 11 pictures Fennimore and Gerda he sang in 1919 alongside John Gläser, Emma Holt and Elisabeth Kandt.

Examples of his appearance in modern operettas are Madame Pompadour by Leo Fall, where he sang René, Comte D'estrades, and Münchhausen by Ernst Steffan where he could be heard in the premiere on 23 December 1927 alongside Hella Kürty, Rose Ader and Fritz Schulz.

At the end of the 1920s, Wirl's participation in performances of contemporary musical avant-garde such as Paul Hindemith's lustiger Oper in drei Teilen Neues vom Tage and Lindberghflug cf. notes on the Ozeanflug. In Bertolt Brecht: Schriften zur Literatur und Kunst. Vol. I. Suhrkamp Verlag, pp. 128–131, and Radiotheorie cf. work introduction He appeared on stage with it both as well as in the broadcast of the Berliner Funkstunde on 18 March 1930 with Fritz Düttbernd and Betty Mergler, see DRA and ORF. "One of the most legendary plays from the late 1920s is a cooperation of Kurt Weill and Paul Hindemith on a text by Bert Brecht..." and in the record studio.

Auch in den modernen Opern von Ernst Křenek trat er auf. Nachdem er bereits am 2. Dezember 1928 bei der Aufführung der Einakter-Trilogie Křeneks in der Kroll Opera House den blinden Offizier und Liebhaber in der „Tragischen Oper in einem Akt“ (so das Vorwort) Der Diktator op. 49 gesungen hatte, gab er in der Aufführung von Křeneks Oper Leben des Orest Op. 60 on 8 March 1930 in der Staatsoper Berlin unter dem Dirigat von Otto Klemperer Agamemnon.

Wirl died in Rottach-Egern at age 69.

=== Filmography ===
- 1921 Tania, the Woman in Chains
- 1929 Eine kleine Liebelei
- 1932 Großstadtnacht with Dolly Haas and Trude Berliner
- 1933 Détective amateur (original title: Kriminalreporter Holm)

== Recordings ==
Wirl sang for the Grammophon, Vox and HMV/Electrola labels. There is no news about him from the time after 1933.

on Grammophon:

- Grammophon 65 572 [042 578] (mx. 1372–m) Wie gefährlich ist die Frau im Negligé (Ade, ade) aus der Operette Die spanische Nachtigall by Leo Fall. Erik Wirl, with orchestra, recorded in Berlin, 10.1920
- Grammophon 65 570 [044 322] (mx. 1371 m) Mon chéri (Mon chéri, heute Nacht) from the operetta Die spanische Nachtigall by Leo Fall. Fritzi Massary and Erik Wirl, with orchestra, recorded in Berlin, 10.1920
- Grammophon 65 572 [044 324] (mx. 1526 s) Fink und Nachtigall (Nachtigall, dir lauscht man überall) from the operetta Die spanische Nachtigall by Leo Fall, Fritzi Massary and Erik Wirl, with orchestra, recorded in Berlin, 11.1920

on Vox:

- Vox 3004 (mx. 18 B) Weinlied aus Der lachende Ehemann (Edmund Eysler)
- Vox 3004 (mx. 19 B) Wiener Fiaker-Lied (Gustav Pick), Erik Wirl, with orchestra accompaniment.
- Vox 3610 E (mx 1106-II BB) Zwei Märchenaugen, song from the operetta Die Zirkusprinzessin (Kálmán)
- Vox 3610 E (mx. 11041 BB) Die kleinen Mädchen im Trikot, Lied und Foxtrot from the operetta Die Zirkusprinzessin (Kálmán), Erik Wirl, with orchestra accompaniment.
- Vox 4199 E (mx. 1105-1 BB) Wenn du mich sitzen läßt, fahr ich sofort nach Budapest. Lied und Foxtrot from the operetta Die Zirkusprinzessin (Kálmán)
- Vox 4199 E (mx. 1107-1 BB) Mein Darling muß so sein, Lied und Foxtrot from the operetta Die Zirkusprinzessin (Kálmán), Erik Wirl, and Marianne Alfermann, with orchestra accompaniment. Februar 1927
- Vox 4201 (mx. 1627 BB) Wenn man für’s Herz was braucht, Foxtrot from the operetta Der blonde Zigeuner (Martin Knopf & Oskar Felix, H.Frey)
- Vox 4201 (mx. 1628 BB) Ich schleich zur Nacht, Blues from the operetta Der blonde Zigeuner (Martin Knopf & Oskar Felix, H.Frey), Erik Wirl, and Marianne Alfermann with orchestra accompaniment, April 1927
- Vox 4202 (mx. ? BB) Selbst die roten Rosen küssen, song from the operetta Der blonde Zigeuner (Martin Knopf & Oskar Felix, H.Frey), Erik Wirl, and Marianne Alfermann, with orchestra accompaniment.

on HMV / Electrola:

- His Master's Voice E.G. 1574 (mx. BLR 5690-I) Frauen, ihr macht uns das Leben schön, Lied aus Marietta (Oscar Strauss. Deutsche Bearbeitung und Gesangstext von Alfred Grünwald), Erik Wirl mit dem Orchester des Metropol-Theaters, Berlin. Dirigent: Kapellmeister H. Bruck
- His Master's Voice E.G. 1574 (mx. BLR 5689-I) Marietta, holdes Frauenbild, Lied aus Marietta (Oskar Strauss. Deutsche Bearbeitung und Gesangstext von Alfred Grünwald), Erik Wirl mit dem Orchester des Metropol-Theaters, Berlin. Dirigent: Kapellmeister H. Bruck
- His Master's Voice E.G. 1796 (mx. BLR 5980-I) Fein, fein schmeckt uns der Wein. Weinlied aus Der lachende Ehemann (Eysler)
- His Master's Voice E.G. 1796 (mx. BLR 5978 II) Trinke Liebchen, trinke schnell. Trinklied aus Die Fledermaus (J. Strauss), Erik Wirl, Tenor. In Deutsch. Mit Orch.
- Electrola E.G.1845 (mx. BLR 6175-II) Auch du wirst mich einmal betrügen, auch du (Stolz, Reisch & Robinson) aus der Tonfilm-Operette Zwei Herzen im Dreivierteltakt. Duett Irene Eisinger und Erik Wirl, mit Orchester.
- Die Aufnahme wurde auch in den USA vertrieben: Victor V. 6082-A You'll Be Unfaithful. Irene Eisinger – Erik Wirl
- Electrola E.G.1846 (mx. BLR 6174-II) Wien, du Stadt der Lieder. Tango aus dem gleichnamigen Atlas-Tonfilm (Hans May. Text von E. Neubach)
- Electrola E.G.1846 (mx. BLR 6176-I) Ja, dort im Liebhardtstal. Ein Wiener Lied aus dem Atlas-Tonfilm Wien, du Stadt der Lieder (Hans May. Instr.: Kurt Lubbe. Text von Hans Pflanzer), Erik Wirl, Tenor, mit Orchesterbegleitung

== Reissues ==
- CDs 75 Jahre Donaueschinger Musiktage 1921–1996 [ WWE 12CD 31899 (WWE 1CD 31900) ], Verlag Col Legno, München 1996, enthält: Lindberghflug / Paul Hindemith, Kurt Weill (18' 25")
- CDs, Four German Sopranos Of The Past, Preiser Records contains: Carl Maria von Weber: Der Freischütz (Op. 77): Wie? was? Entsetzen! Erik Wirl / Irene Eisinger / Käte Heidersbach, 1930 (6' 32").
- CD Imre Kálmán: Du bist das Liebste: Ein Komponistenportrait, Duophon Records, Fa. Alfred Wagner, enthält als track 8 Marianne Alfermann & Erik Wirl: Wenn du mich sitzen lässt.
- CD Tonfilmschlager der Weimarer Republik (1929–1933), Duophon Records, Fa. Alfred Wagner, contained as track 22 Irene Eisinger, Erik Wirl – Auch du wirst mich einmal betrügen.
- CD Fritzi Massary 4, TrueSoundTransfers, Fa. Chr. Zwarg, Best. Nr. TT-3053 contains three Grammophon-recording with Fritzi Massary and Erik Wirl from the operetta Die spanische Nachtigall by Leo Fall.
- Vinyl LP A-6034 A / A-6034 B Brüder, zur Sonne, zur Freiheit: Arbeitermusik der Weimarer Republik in Originalaufnahmen. Label: pläne – 88287, pläne – 88287 G (1982). Thereof re-recording on CD (No. 1627, 1995) contained as track 10 Erik Wirl with Orchestra: Die Massnahme.
