= Fritz Uhl =

Austrian opera singer

Fritz Uhl (2 April 1928 – 21 May 2001) was an Austrian operatic tenor, particularly associated with Wagner roles.

Born in Matzleinsdorf, near Vienna, he studied in Vienna with Elisabeth Radó, and while still a student toured the Netherlands with an operetta troupe. He made his operatic debut in Vienna as Gounod's Faust in 1952, and then sang in Graz (1952–53), in Luzern (1953–54), in Oberhausen (1954–56), in Wuppertal (1956–58). In 1957, he began making guest appearances at the Munich State Opera and the Vienna State Opera, also appearing at the Salzburg Festival and the Bayreuth Festival.

He began his career by singing lyric roles and lighter Wagner roles such as Erik in Der fliegende Holländer, Loge in Das Rheingold, First Knight in Parsifal, and gradually moved into heldentenor roles such as Tristan, Siegmund, Stolzing, Florestan, and Herod.

He sang widely in Europe, appearing at the Paris Opéra, La Monnaie in Brussels, the Liceo in Barcelona, the Maggio Musicale Fiorentino, and the Royal Opera House in London. He also performed at the San Francisco Opera and the Teatro Colón in Buenos Aires.

He took part in the creation of Ján Cikker's Das Spiel von Liebe und Tod in 1969, and in Heinrich Sutermeister's Le roi Béranger in 1985, both in Munich.

He is best known for his recording of Tristan und Isolde, opposite Birgit Nilsson, under Sir Georg Solti.

== Selected recordings ==
- Berlioz, Benvenuto Cellini : Edith Kermer (Teresa), Fritz Uhl (Cellini), Otto Wiener (Fieramosca), Leo Heppe, Grosses Wiener Rundfunkorchester, conducted by Kurt Tenner. (sung in German) Wallhall Eternity series CD-9737514 (1952)

== Sources ==
- Operissimo.com
