= Rosette Anday =

Hungarian opera singer (1899–1977)

Piroska Anday (12 December 1899, in Budapest – 22 December 1977, in Vienna) known as Rosette Anday, was a leading Hungarian mezzo-soprano.

== Life ==
On 23 September 1921, Bizet's opera Carmen was performed at the Vienna State Opera and a hitherto unknown 18-year-old woman sang the most difficult arias of the opera. Franz Schalk, the then director of the Vienna State Opera, had heard the young singer a few months earlier in Budapest, where she studied singing at the local conservatory and took violin lessons with the composer Jenő Hubay. Schalk employed her immediately, without offering her a customary guest engagement and within a short time Rosette Anday became one of the leading mezzo-sopranos of the Vienna State Opera.

One of her teachers was the alto and mezzo soprano Mme. Charles Cahier who had sung Carmen at the Vienna Court Opera between 1907 and 1911. Funded by Schalk and Richard Strauss, she gave her first song recital in the Grand Musikverein in Vienna in the same season.

After her debut, she sang first as Cherubino in Mozart's opera Le nozze di Figaro, then as Dorabella in the opera Così fan tutte (in this role she also appeared in one of the first opera performances of the Salzburg Festival). Since her voice became increasingly voluminous in a very short time, she took more and more roles in French and Italian opera in her repertoire and sang in Verdi's opera Aida, the figure of Waltraute in Wagner's opera Götterdämmerung and the role of Brangäne in Tristan and Isolde. Five years after her debut at the Vienna State Opera, she sang the dream role of every mezzo soprano: The role of Dalila in Camille Saint-Saëns opera Samson et Dalila.

Afterwards she toured through all major opera houses in Europe, as well as through North and South America. Here she celebrated her greatest success in the role of Klytämnestra in the ostrich -Oper Elektra, but the Vienna State Opera was always closely connected.

In 1938, after the annexation of Austria, Rosette Anday was banned from performing because of her Jewish background, she lived in a "privileged mixed marriage", but had to hide from the deportations.

Shortly after the end of the war she started her new career at the Theater an der Wien.

Rosette Anday was one of the youngest chamber singer in history and one of the most dedicated opera singers ever. She won many prizes around the globe. From the Vienna State Opera her membership was transferred honorary. Extremely popular in Viennese society, she lived in her villa in Pressbaum ( St. Pölten-Land district ) in Rosette Anday Street until the end of her life. She died ten days after her 74th birthday and found her final resting place in a grave of honor (German: Ehrengrab) at the Vienna Central Cemetery (group 32 C, number 48).

== Honors ==
- 1955: Golden medal for services to the Republic of Austria
- In 1980, the Andayweg was named after her in Vienna Penzing (14th district) .

== Literature ==
- Anday, Rosette. In: Großes Sängerlexikon, 2000, S. 493ff.
