= Hermann Gallos =

Austrian opera singer (1886–1957)

- Born: 21 January 1886; Vienna, Austria
- Died: 20 February 1957 (aged 71); Vienna, Austria
- Burial place: Vienna Central Cemetery
- Education: University of Vienna; Vienna Music Academy
- Occupations: Operatic tenor; Academic voice teacher
- Organizations: Vienna State Opera; Salzburg Festival; Vienna Music Academy

Hermann Gallos (21 January 1886 – 20 February 1957) was an Austrian operatic tenor and academic teacher. He was a long-standing ensemble member of the Vienna State Opera and performed regularly at the Salzburg Festival from 1922 to 1950, in roles such as Pedrillo in Mozart's Die Entführung aus dem Serail and Valzacchi in Der Rosenkavalier by Richard Strauss.

== Life and career ==
Born in Vienna, Gallos first studied law at the University of Vienna, and then voice at the Vienna Music Academy. He sang predominantly buffo roles and was often heard in important tenor secondary roles. In 1922, the first year in which operas were performed at the Salzburg Festival, he appeared in Mozart operas, as Pedrillo in Die Entführung aus dem Serail and Don Curzio in Le nozze di Figaro, both conducted by Franz Schalk. He appeared at the festival until 1950. He was involved in several new productions after the reconstruction of the Kleines Festspielhaus: in 1927 and 1936 as Jaquino in Beethoven's Fidelio, from 1936 to 1938 as Augustin Moser in Wagner's Die Meistersinger von Nürnberg and often as Valzacchi in Der Rosenkavalier by Richard Strauss, between 1929 and 1946.

Gallos was for decades a member of the Vienna State Opera. He appeared as Scaramuccio in the first performance of the revised version of Ariadne auf Naxos on 4 October 1916, singing 112 performances in the role. He toured with the ensemble to the Paris Opera in 1928.

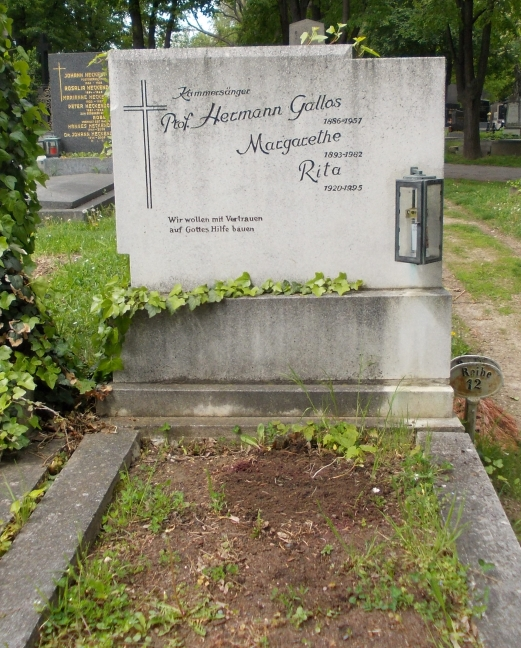
Grave of Hermann Gallos

Gallos also taught at the Vienna Music Academy. He was a teacher of Hans Braun and Walter Berry, among others.

Gallos died in Vienna at age 71. He is buried in the Vienna Central Cemetery (group 33F, row 12, number 8).

== Discography ==
Recordings with Gallos are held by the German National Library, including:

- 1933: Der Rosenkavalier (complete recording, Vienna)
- 1944: Fidelio (complete recording at Konzerthaus, Vienna)
- 1950–1951: Die Meistersinger von Nürnberg, conductor: Hans Knappertsbusch
- 1954: Salome, conductor: Clemens Krauss (Naxos Historical)
