= Elisabeth Radó =

- Born: 29 October 1899; Mostar, Condominium of Bosnia and Herzegovina, Austria-Hungary
- Died: 3 April 1986 (aged 86); Vienna, Austria

Elisabeth Radó (29 October 1899 – 3 April 1986) was a Yugoslavian singer and singing teacher from Bosnia and Herzegovina.

== Biography ==
Born in Mostar, Bosnia and Herzegovina, which in the days before World War I was still part of the Austro-Hungarian Empire. She studied singing with her adoptive mother, the singer Maria Rado, and like many singers, was attracted to the capital city of Vienna, where she started her career as a concert and opera singer in the 1920s. She began giving singing lessons in 1931 and became one of the most respected singing teachers in the city. From 1950–1966, she taught singing at the Academy (now: University) of Music and Performing Arts in Vienna. She died in Vienna, on 3 April 1986.

Elisabeth Radó was a woman with strong features, a rather square jaw, and a professorial demeanor. She was a teacher who obviously took her work quite seriously and was highly respected as a voice teacher in Vienna by such professional musicians as Mozart specialist Dr. Ernst Reichert. At one time, she had over 83 students singing in opera theaters throughout Germany, Switzerland and Austria.

Not only was Elisabeth Radó a well-known teacher, she also had an excellent reputation as the teacher of many famous singers, among them baritone Eberhard Waechter and tenors Fritz Uhl, Waldemar Kmentt and Werner Krenn, singers who were in great demand as leading men at the Wiener Staatsoper and in all the major German opera houses. South African baritone George Fourie was one of her students, as was mezzo-soprano Gertrude Jahn or soprano Dorit Hanak. She also taught the Americans Kieth Engen, Emile Belcourt, Frederick Guthrie, and Joseph Meyers. These last were part of the large groups of Americans who came to Vienna after World War II to study opera, both because of the high quality of education found in that city and the low cost compared to study in the United States, as well as the abundant opportunities to start a career by singing in one of the many opera houses in the German-speaking countries of Austria, Germany and Switzerland. All of these singers recommended her highly.
