= Hans Breuer (tenor) =

German tenor

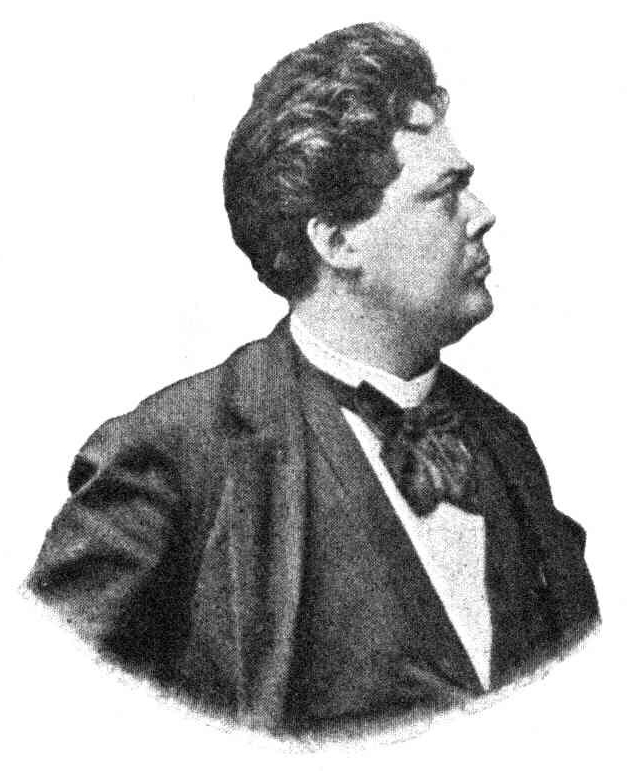
Breuer ca. 1896

Hans Breuer (27 April 1868, after other sources 1870 – 11 October 1929) was a German operatic tenor and opera director.

== Life ==
Born in Cologne, the son of the Cologne Cathedral sculptor Peter Breuer first began a commercial apprenticeship. He studied singing with Benno Stolzenberg in Cologne on the advice of the conductor Franz Wüllner then completed his studies at the Bayreuth school with Julius Kniese and Cosima Wagner.

Breuer made his debut in 1894 in small roles at the Bayreuth Festival. His breakthrough came in 1896 as the mime in Siegfried. Until 1914, he appeared regularly in this role at Bayreuth, and in 1899 also as David in Die Meistersinger von Nürnberg.

From 1896 to 1897, he sang at the Wrocław Opera, and in 1897 he undertook a guest performance tour of North America. From 1899 to 1900, he was a member of the ensemble at the Metropolitan Opera in New York City. His debut role here was that of the Steersman in The Flying Dutchman. In 1898 and 1900, he made guest appearances at the Royal Opera House in London, in 1901 as Mime at the Staatsoper Unter den Linden and in the same role in 1906 at the Bavarian State Opera.

From 1900 to 1929, he was a member of the Vienna State Opera (since 1918 State Opera). Here he was seen and heard as Melot in the New production of Tristan und Isolde conducted by Gustav Mahler in 1903. In 1909, he gave a guest performance as Mime at the Zurich Opera House, in 1910 at the Salzburg Mozart Festival as Monostatos in the magic flute. In 1922 and 1925 he appeared as Basilio in the marriage of Figaro at the Salzburg Festival.

On 10 October 1919, he staged the world premiere of the opera Die Frau ohne Schatten by Richard Strauss at the Vienna State Opera. He also took on directing duties at the Salzburg Festival on several occasions. Thus, in 1922, he directed all four operas performed at the Festival (it was the first year in which any operas were performed there). Later, Breuer was active as a pedagogue.

Breuer died in Perchtoldsdorf, where he was also buried at Perchtoldsdorfer Friedhof.

His son Siegfried Breuer (1906-1954) became a well-known actor.
