= Alfred Jerger =

Austrian opera singer

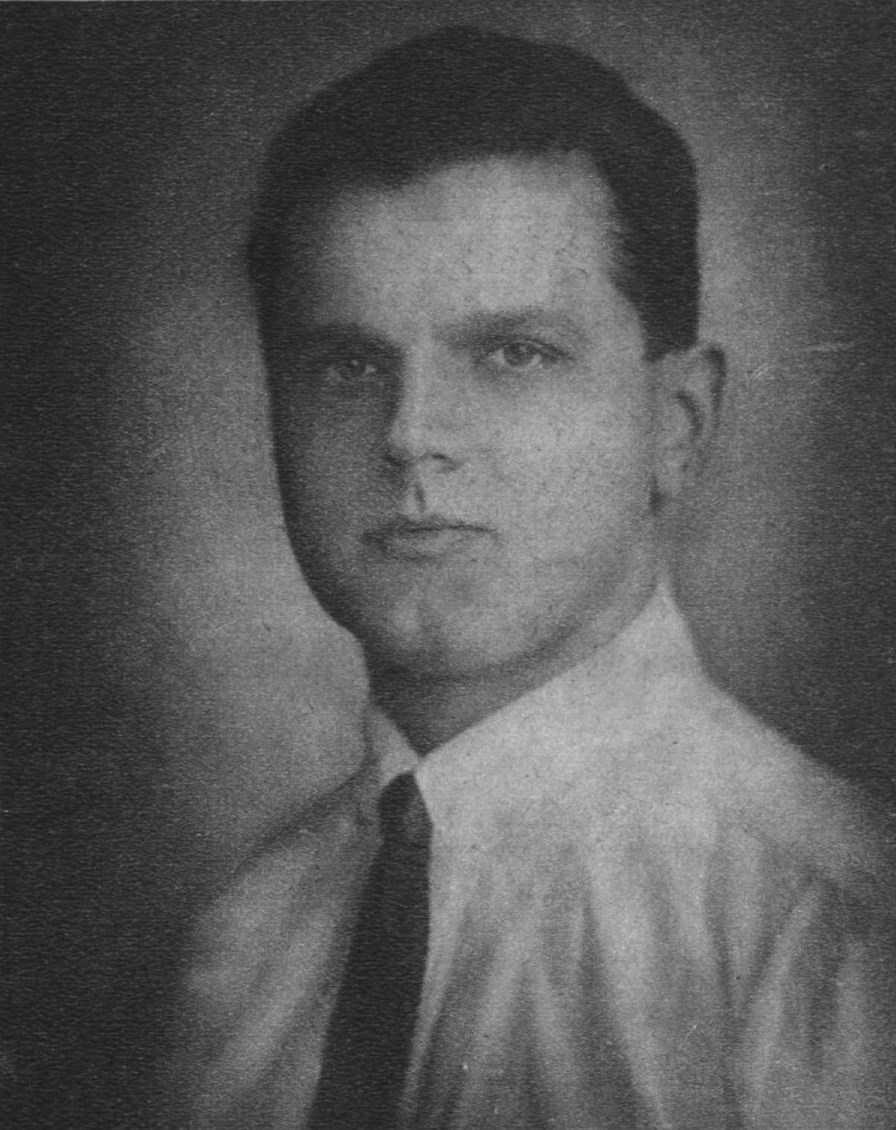
- Alfred Jerger, photo by Franz Xaver Setzer in Das interessante Blatt in 1922
- Born: Alois Wendelin; 9 June 1889; Brno
- Died: 18 November 1976 (aged 87); Vienna, Austria
- Occupation: Operatic bass

Alfred Jerger (9 June 1889 – 18 November 1976) was an Austrian operatic bass-baritone, who began his career as a conductor of operettas, and was also an interim director of the Vienna State Opera and a professor of the Vienna Music Academy. He appeared at the Salzburg Festival from 1922 to 1959, and created the leading role of Mandryka in Arabella by Richard Strauss, among others.

== Life and career ==
Born Alois Wendelin in Brno, he is said to have studied at the University of Music and Performing Arts Vienna. He became operetta-Kapellmeister at the Stadttheater Passau in the 1912/13 season. The next season saw him in Winterthur and Zurich in 1915, where he served as répétiteur. A year later he also appeared as an actor, and from the 1915/16 season only as actor and singer. In 1917, he appeared as Lothario in Mignon by Ambroise Thomas. He appeared in the world premiere of Busoni's Turandot the same year.

In 1919 he became a member of the Bavarian State Opera through the mediation of Richard Strauss. In 1921, he moved on to the Vienna State Opera, where he worked until 1953, performing 150 roles. He also dealt with new arrangement of librettos. Among others, he wrote new versions for Die Fledermaus by Johann Strauss and Donizeti's Don Pasquale for performances at the house. Jerger created the role of the Man in Schönberg's Die glückliche Hand at the Theater an der Wien in 1924. On 1 July 1933, he appeared in the leading role of Mandryka in the premiere of Arabella by Richard Strauss at the Semperoper in Dresden. Jerger performed opposite Viorica Ursuleac in the title role, with Clemens Krauss conducting.

From 1922 to 1959, Jerger often took part in the Salzburg Festival, where he made his debut in the title role of Mozart's Don Giovanni, with Richard Strauss as the conductor. He also appeared as Sixtus Beckmesser in Wagner's Die Meistersinger von Nürnberg, conducted by Wilhelm Furtwängler in 1938. He coached younger singers for their roles, such as George London for Don Giovanni and Eugene Onegin. In the film Immortal Melodies (1935) he was seen in the leading role of the waltz king Johann Strauss. In 1945, the ensemble of the Vienna State Opera made him the provisional artistic director. In 1947 he was appointed professor at the Vienna Music Academy. Among his students was Leonie Rysanek.

Jerger undertook numerous tours and left behind many recordings. In 1969, at the age of 80, he took part in a recording of Der Rosenkavalier in the role of the notary.

Jerger died in Vienna on 18 November 1976 at age 87. His grave is located at the Vienna Central Cemetery (group 40, number 46).

== Awards ==
Jerger was awarded the title Kammersänger in 1934, and received the Cross (Ritterkreuz I. Klasse) of the Austrian Decoration for Science and Art the same year. He became a knight of the Legion of Honour before 1936. On 8 June 1959 he was awarded the Ehrenmedaille der Bundeshauptstadt Wien, and was an honorary member of the Vienna State Opera from 1960.

== Sound samples ==
- Die Zauberflöte – Toscanini – Salzburg 1937 – 1. Act
- Die Zauberflöte – Toscanini – Salzburg 1937 – 2. Act with Alexander Kipnis (Sarastro), Julia Osváth (Queen of the night), Jarmila Novotná (Pamina), Helge Rosvaenge (Tamino), Willi Domgraf-Fassbaender (Papageno), Dora Komarek (Papagena), Alfred Jerger (narrator), William Wernigk (Monostatos) – live 30 July 1937 Salzburg Festival

== See also ==
- Salzburg Festival: history and repertoire, 1922–1926
