= Lotte Schöne =

Austrian opera singer

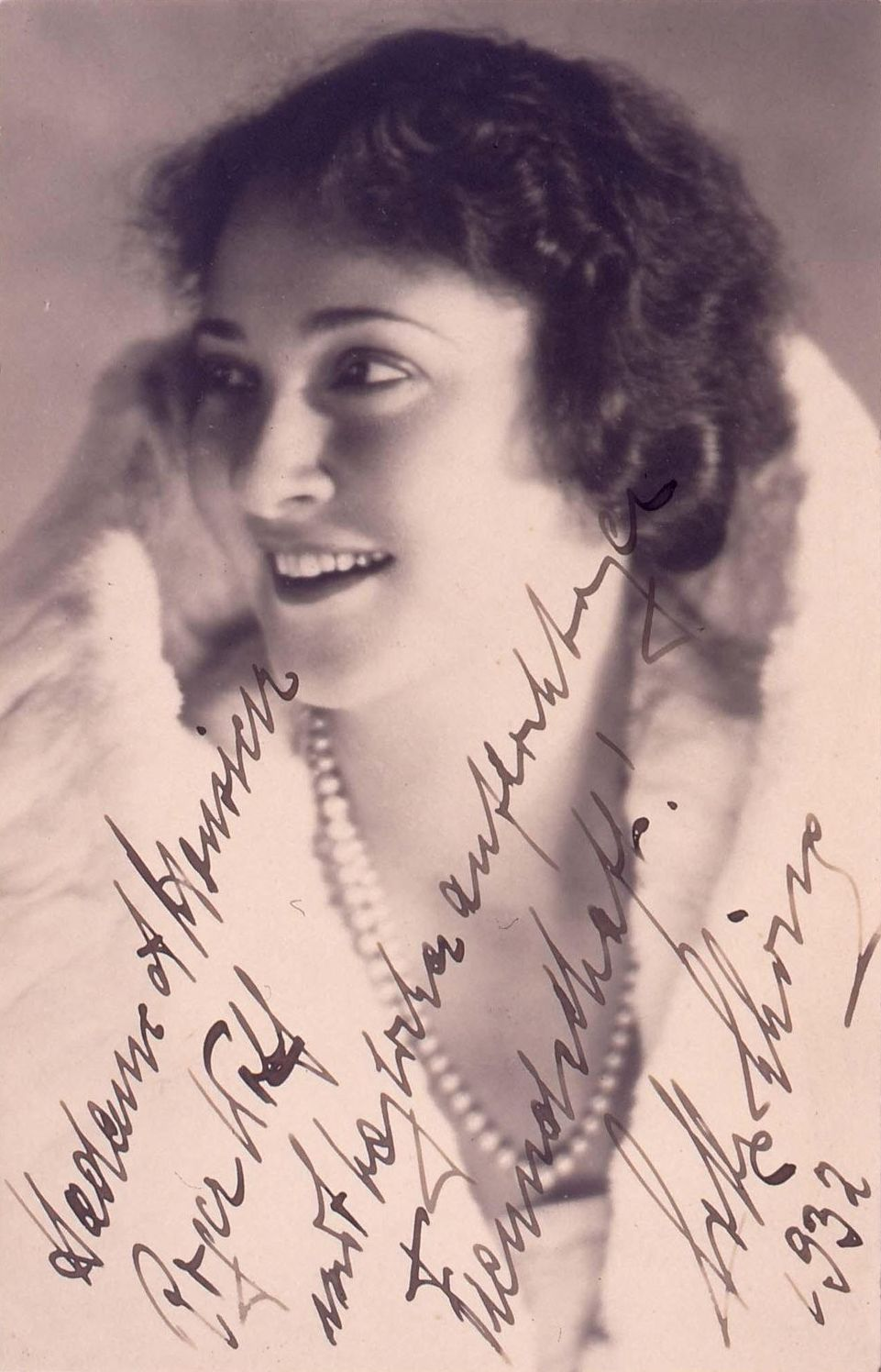
Lotte Schöne

Lotte Schöne, née Charlotte Bodenstein (December 15, 1891 – December 22, 1977) was an Austrian lyric coloratura soprano.

Born in Vienna, Schöne studied music in that city and made her debut in 1912 at the Vienna Volksoper as a bridesmaid in Der Freischütz. From 1917 until 1925 she was on the roster of the Vienna State Opera where she sang all the major light lyric parts. Between 1922 and 1934 she was also a regular at the Salzburg Festival, singing Zerlina, Blonde, and Despina. From 1925 to 1933 she also sang regularly at the Berlin State Opera in roles such as Manon, Mimi, and Cio-Cio-San. For London she created Liù in 1927, her only season at the Royal Opera House. With the rise of the Nazi Party, Schöne moved to Paris and joined the Opéra-Comique, where she was especially noted for her Mélisande. After performances as Marcellina and Zerlina under Bruno Walter at the Paris Opera in 1937, she retired almost completely from the stage. Schöne was of Jewish extraction, and was forced to hide during the German occupation of France during World War II. When she emerged, in 1945, she returned to singing, but almost exclusively in concerts. She retired for good in 1953 and became a voice teacher in Paris. She died in Bobigny.

Schöne was especially noted for her performances in the works of Mozart and Richard Strauss. She recorded a number of musical excerpts from both operas and operettas during her career, which may today still be heard on compact disc. Her complete recordings, including unpublished items, private recordings and broadcasts, are available as a set from Marston Records.
