= Maria Gerhart =

Austrian operatic soprano (1890–1975)

Maria Gerhart, also Marie Gerhart, married name Maria Gerhart-Gschwandtner (10 July 1890 – 2 November 1975) was an Austrian operatic soprano.

== Life ==
Born in Vienna, Gerhart completed her music education at the Vienna Conservatory. In 1918 she made her debut at the Volksoper Wien, in 1919 at the Wiener Staatsoper (the denomination of the institution opera throughout history official designation was then Opera theatre). From 1923 to 1939, she was a member of the ensemble of the Staatsoper, during which time she performed a total of 24 roles in 394 performances. At the Salzburg Festival, the artist sang leading roles from 1926 to 1933, especially the Queen of the Night, but also Konstanze and Fiordiligi in Mozart operas as well as Zerbinetta in Ariadne auf Naxos by Hugo von Hofmannsthal and Richard Strauss. As Konstanze, "after the 'martyrdom aria', [she] gained applause on the open scene", as the Neue Musikzeitung wrote in a festival report. In 1934, she was awarded the title Kammersängerin at the Vienna State Opera. From 1 November 1950 to 30 November 1934. September 1955 she taught at the University of Music and Performing Arts Vienna, among her students was the soprano Liselotte Maikl and Maria von Guggenberg-Barska. In 1970 the singer was appointed honorary member of the Vienna State Opera.

Gerhart shone in the classical coloratura parts – Donizetti's Lucia, Mozart's Constanze and Queen of the Night, Verdi's Gilda, Strauss' Sophie, Zerbinetta and Fiakermilli – but also sang lyrical parts, like Fiordiligi, Liu, Oscar and Adina in L'elisir d'amore.

Gerhart was married to the accompanist and conductor Rudolf Gschwandtner.

== Roles ==
Donizetti: Adina in L'elisir d'amore; Titelpartie in Lucia di Lammermoor; Norina in Don Pasquale; Gluck: Fatime in Le cadi dupé; Grosz: Dorimene in Sganarell; Halévy: Prinzessin Eudoxie in La Juive; Kienzl: Die Herzogin in Don Quixote; Leoncavallo: Nedda in Pagliacci; Meyerbeer: Marguerite von Valois in Les Huguenots; Ines in L'Africaine; Mozart: Konstanze in Die Entführung aus dem Serail; Fiordiligi in Così fan tutte; Queen of the nightKönigin der Nacht in The Magic Flute	Nicolai: Frau Fluth in The Merry Wives of Windsor; Pfitzner: Ighino und Engelsstimme in Palestrina; Puccini: Liù in Turandot; Richard Strauss: Sophie in Der Rosenkavalier; Zerbinetta in Ariadne auf Naxos; Die Fiakermilli in Arabella; Verdi: Oscar in Un ballo in maschera; Gilda in Rigoletto; Wagner: Klingsor's Magic Girl in Parsifal; Weber: Fatime in Abu Hassan

Sources for the list of roles:
