= Otto Wiener (baritone) =

Austrian baritone

Otto Wiener (February 13, 1911 – August 5, 2000) was an Austrian baritone, notable for his performances in the operas of Richard Wagner.

He was born in Vienna, joined the Vienna Boys' Choir at the age of six, and started his adult career as a concert singer before making his stage debut in 1953 at Graz in the title-role of Simon Boccanegra. He subsequently sang with the opera companies at Düsseldorf, Frankfurt and Berlin and performed at the Vienna State Opera from 1957 onwards and at the Bavarian State Opera from 1960. He appeared at the Salzburg Festival in 1955 and sang there in the stage première of Frank Martin's Le mystère de la Nativité.

Wiener first appeared at the Bayreuth Festival in 1957, and sang there until 1963 as Hans Sachs in Die Meistersinger von Nürnberg, Gunther in Götterdämmerung, Wotan/Wanderer in Der Ring des Nibelungen and in the title-role of Der fliegende Holländer. In 1962 he performed the role of Sachs at both the Royal Opera House, Covent Garden, and the Metropolitan Opera. In 1964, he appeared at the Glyndebourne Festival Opera in the role of La Roche in Capriccio.

Wiener was one of the highest and brightest of the successful heldenbaritones of the 1950s and 60s. He was cast in roles usually reserved for deeper, darker voices because his technique was so relaxed, well-projected, and free. Besides the above-listed roles, he is on record as Faninal in Der Rosenkavalier, the Heerrufer in Lohengrin, Ottavio in The Coronation of Poppea, and Wotan/Wanderer in The Ring of the Nibelung.

His non-opera recordings include Beethoven's Missa Solemnis and Ninth Symphony, Haydn's Seven Last Words of Christ, Bach's St. Matthew Passion, and Brahms' A German Requiem.

Wiener retired in 1976 and died in Vienna.

== Selected recordings ==
- Berlioz, Benvenuto Cellini, Edith Kermer (Teresa), Fritz Uhl (Cellini), Otto Wiener (Fieramosca), Leo Heppe, Grosses Wiener Rundfunkorchester, conducted by Kurt Tenner. (sung in german). Wallhall Eternity series CD-9737514 (1952)

== Sources ==
- New Grove Dictionary of Opera, vol 4, p. 1154.
- Rudolf Grossmaier: Otto Wiener: Der unvergessliche Hans Sachs, Wien 2014 ISBN 978-3-73577-935-9
