= Edytha Fleischer =

German opera soprano (1898–1957)

Edytha Fleischer-Engel (5 April 1898 – 1957) was a German soprano and voice teacher. She began her career as a principal artist at the Berlin State Opera and the Salzburg Festival.

She was a leading soprano at the Metropolitan Opera from 1926 to 1936, and at the Teatro Colón in Buenos Aires from 1934 until her retirement from the stage in 1949. Her husband, conductor Erich Engel, was the director of the latter institution.

Fleischer began teaching singing while living in Argentina. In 1949, she joined the voice faculty of the Vienna Conservatory. She later taught singing out of a private studio in Zürich.

== Life and career ==
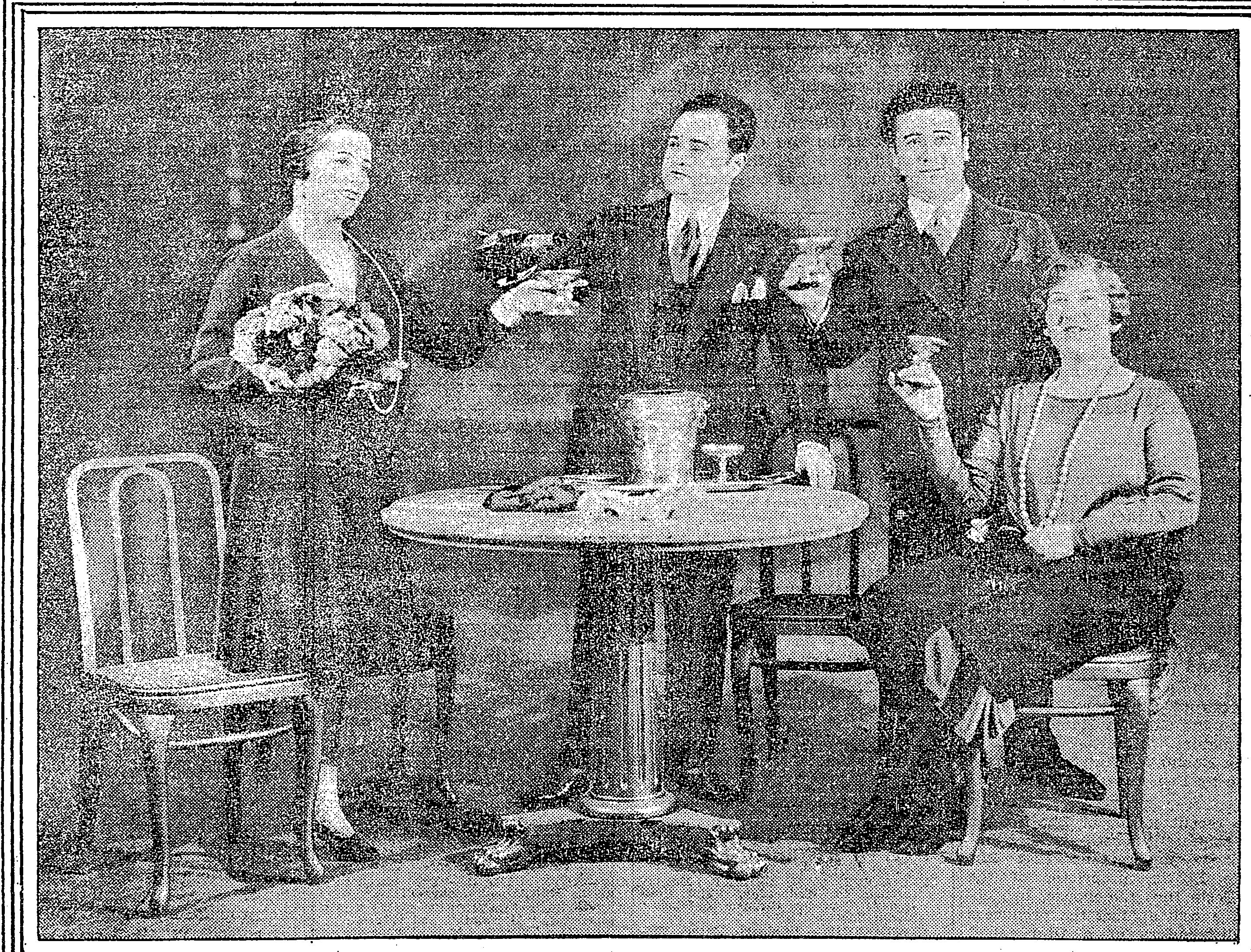
Fleischer at right during a rehearsal of La rondine in 1928

Edytha Fleischer was born in Falkenstein, Bavaria on 5 April 1898. She was the younger sister of tenor Hanns Fleischer. She studied singing with Lilli Lehmann. She made her debut in 1917 at the Berlin State Opera (BSO). At the BSO she had an early success as Konstanze in Mozart's Die Entführung aus dem Serail. She continued to excel in portrayals of heroines in Mozart operas at the BSO and at the Salzburg Festival; making her first appearances at the latter institution in 1922 as Susanna in The Marriage of Figaro and Zerlina in Don Giovanni.

From 1922 to 1924, Fleischer was a principal artist with a touring opera company which performed throughout North America. Roles she performed with that company included Adele in Die Fledermaus, Hansel in Hansel and Gretel, Marzelline in Fidelio, and Susanna. In 1925, she performed concerts on tour in Italy. She also worked for another touring opera company in America, the William Wade Hinshaw Company, in 1925–1926 with whom she mainly performed Mozart roles in English.

On 6 November 1926, she made her debut at the Metropolitan Opera as the First Lady in The Magic Flute under the baton of Artur Bodanzky. She performed for ten seasons at the Met in a total of 400 performances.

She appeared in several United States premieres at the Met, including Lisette in Puccini's La rondine (1928), Aithra in Richard Strauss' Die ägyptische Helena (1928), Yvonne in Ernst Krenek's Jonny spielt auf (1929), Volkhova in Nikolai Rimsky-Korsakov's Sadko (1930), and Sofia in Rossini's Il signor Bruschino. Other roles she sang for the company included Adina in L'elisir d'amore, Alice Ford in Falstaff, Ännchen in Der Freischütz, Berthe in Le prophète, Dorabella in Così fan tutte, Eva in Die Meistersinger von Nürnberg, Fiametta in Boccaccio, the Forest Bird in Siegfried, both Gutrune and the 3rd Norn in Götterdämmerung, Hänsel, Lauretta in Gianni Schicchi, Marguerite in Faust, Marzelline, Mathilde in William Tell, Micaela in Carmen, Musetta in La bohème, Nedda in Pagliacci, Ortlinde in Die Walküre, Pamina in The Magic Flute, Petrita in Suppé's Donna Juanita, Princess Eudoxie in La Juive, Serpina in La serva padrona, the Shepherd in Tannhäuser, Sophie in Der Rosenkavalier, Stéphano in Roméo et Juliette, Woglinde in Das Rheingold and Zerlina. Her last performance at the Met was as Woglinde in Götterdämmerung on March 21, 1936.

From 1934 until her retirement in 1949, Fleischer was a leading soprano at the Teatro Colón in Buenos Aires where her husband, conductor Erich Engel, was the director. She also appeared regularly in concert halls in Denmark, Germany, and New York during her career. She began teaching singing while living in Argentina where her pupils included soprano Nilda Hofmann and bass Carlos Feller.

In 1949, she joined the voice faculty of the Vienna Conservatory. She later taught singing out of a private studio in Zürich.

She died in 1957.
