= John Gläser =

German tenor

John Gläser (12 June 1888 – 27 May 1968) was a German operatic tenor, voice teacher and Theaterfunktionär. His career as a performer spanned from 1911 up until 1942, after which he became a singing teacher in his later years.

Born in Berlin, Gläser was already a soloist of the Hof- und Domchor before he began his real singing studies in Berlin. His stage career started in 1911 at Theater Ulm. After that, he was at the Landestheater Altenburg (Thuringia) and came to the Wrocław Opera in 1912. Five years later, he went to the Oper Frankfurt, where he stayed until the end of his career. In Frankfurt, he sang among others Elis on 21 January 1920 at the premiere of the opera Der Schatzgräber by Franz Schreker. Guest appearances took him to Berlin, Munich, Hamburg, Vienna and to the Salzburg Festival of 1926, where he sang Bacchus in Ariadne auf Naxos. p. 1750 On the occasion of his 25th anniversary in Frankfurt in 1942, he gave his last performance as "Canio" in Pagliacci. After that, he continued to work as a singing teacher. From 1961 to 1963, he was also honorary president of the Guild of the German Stage.
