= Hermine Kittel =

Austrian opera singer

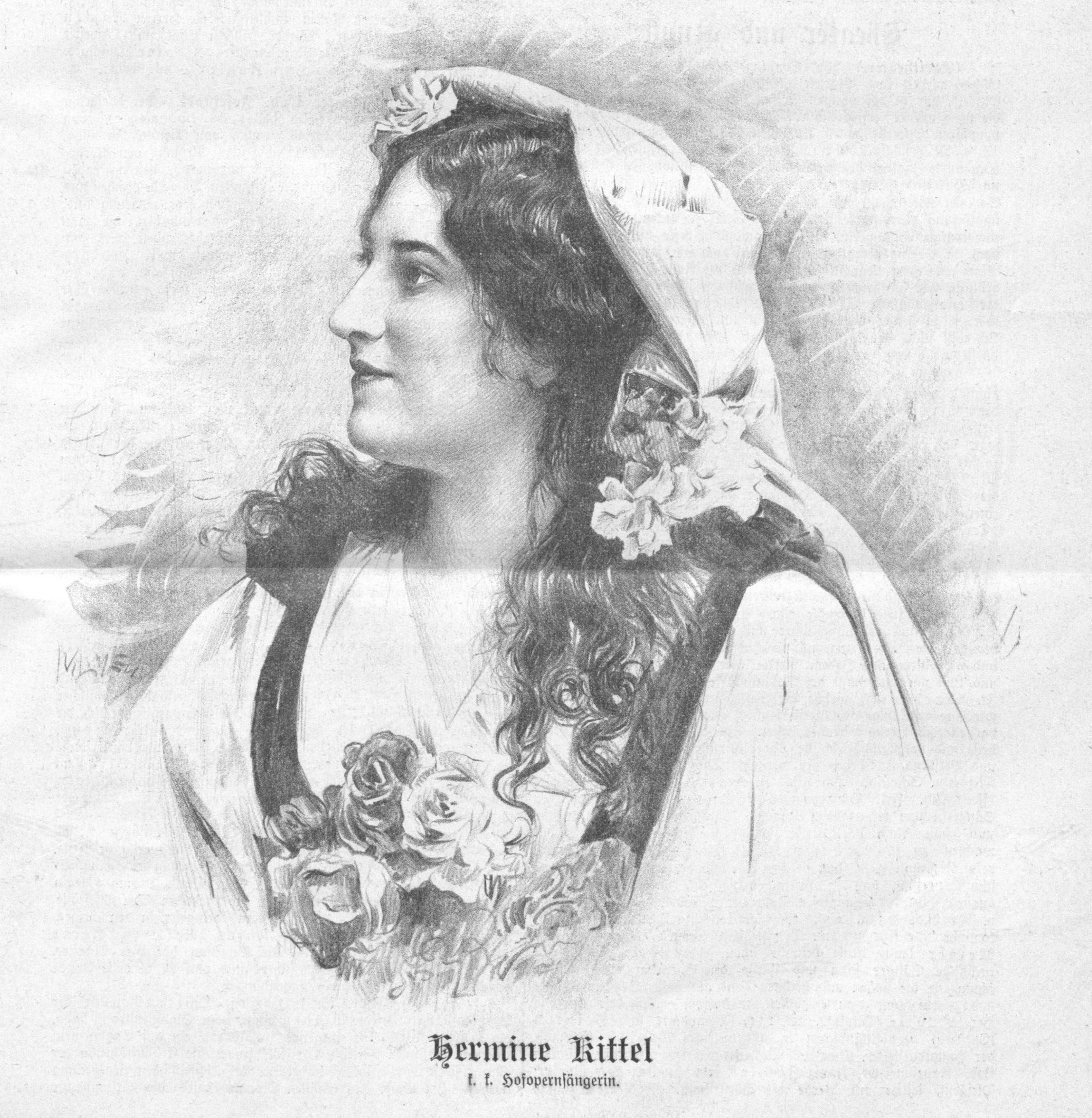
Hermine Kittel in 1902

Hermine Kittel (December 2, 1879 – April 7, 1948) was an Austrian contralto from Vienna. She studied singing with Amalie Materna in Vienna. She made her operatic debut in 1897 in Ljubljana. Kittel first sang under Gustav Mahler at the Vienna Hofoper (Vienna State Opera) and later premiered in a revision of Ariadne auf Naxos. She sang at the Bayreuth Festival in 1902 and 1908, where she sang Erda in Der Ring des Nibelungen. She also sang at the Salzburg Festival, where she often played Marcellina in The Marriage of Figaro.

She was married to opera singer Alexander Haydter. Her brother Karl Kittel was a conductor.

== Films ==
- 1941: Aufruhr im Damenstift
