= Felicie Hüni-Mihacsek =

Hungarian operatic soprano singer (1891-1976)

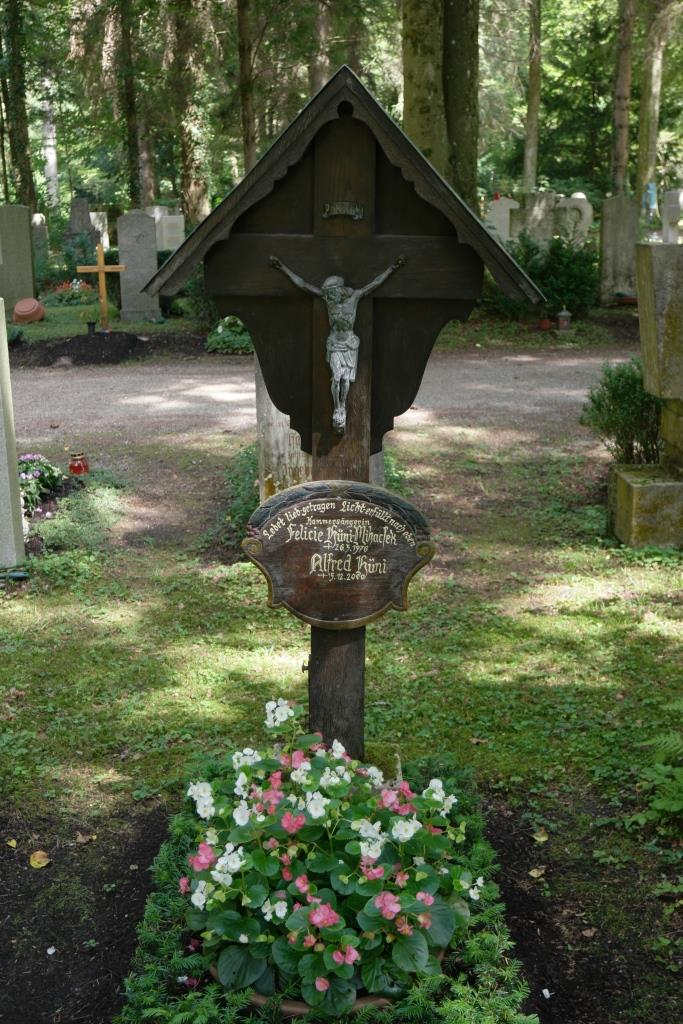
Grave of Felicie Hüni-Mihacsek at Waldfriedhof Solln in Munich

Felicie Hüni-Mihacsek (3 April 1891, Pécs – 26 March 1976, Munich) was a Hungarian operatic coloratura soprano, largely based in Germany and one of the greatest Mozart singers of the inter-war period.

She studied in Vienna with Rose Papier, and began her career at the Hamburg State Opera in 1916. She made her debut at the Vienna State Opera in 1919, where she took part in the creation of Richard Strauss's Die Frau ohne Schatten. She remained in Vienna until 1925, and then joined the Munich State Opera in 1926, where she remained until 1945. She also appeared at the Salzburg Festival, in Mozart roles such as Konstanze, Countess Almaviva, Donna Anna, Fiordiligi, both Pamina and the Queen of the Night.

She made guest appearances in Frankfurt, Dresden, Zurich, London, Prague, and Budapest, and she created Pfitzner's Das Herz, in Munich in 1931, other notable operatic roles included Eva and Die Marschallin.

After 1945, she appeared mostly in concert and began teaching. Her farewell performance was in Munich, as the Marschallin in 1953. Throughout her career, she was much admired for her vocal beauty and elegance, and impeccable technique.

She was married to Swiss industrialist Albert Hüni.

== Sources ==
- Operissimo.com
