= Hans Ewald Heller =

Austrian-American composer

- Born: Hans Edwald Heller; 17 April 1894; Vienna, Austria
- Died: October 1, 1966 (aged 72); New York City
- Occupation(s): Composer, music critic, teacher

Hans Ewald Heller (17 April 1894 – 1 October 1966) was an Austrian-American composer, music critic and teacher.

== Life ==
Heller studied with Camilla Horn and J. B. Foerster and received a doctorates from the University of Prague and the University of Vienna. He lived in Vienna where he worked as a music teacher and critic, editing several journals and magazines. He was an orchestrator for the Vienna Broadcasting System and taught classes on music for film. He was described in The New York Times as being the cousin of Albert Einstein.

In 1938, he moved to the United States and died in 1966.

== Selected compositions ==
=== Light operas ===
- Satan (Vienna, 1927)
- Messalina (Prague, 1928)
- Der Liebling von London (Vienna, 1930)

=== Overtures ===
- Carnival in New Orleans (1940)

=== Cantatas ===
- Ode to Our Women (1942)
