= Karola Jovanović =

Austrian soprano

Karola Jovanović (Serbian: Карола Јовановић; 1879 – January 1958 in Vienna) was an Austrian operatic soprano.

== Life ==
From 1904 to 1905 she was active as a singer in Moravia, at the city theatre of Olomouc. She then worked as a singer at the Oper Frankfurt until 1906 and then at the Graz Opera until 1911. After 1911, she went to the Vienna State Opera, where she had already made guest appearances in 1909 and 1911, and remained there until 1932, sometimes casting the role of the nymph Echo in the October 1916 premiere of the second version of Richard Strauss's opera Ariadne auf Naxos.

Guest appearances took her to the Bayerische Staatsoper in 1906 and 1907, to the Staatsoper Unter den Linden in 1908 and 1911, and to the Salzburg Festival in 1922, 1926 and from 1929 to 1934.

Other operatic roles included Marie in Der Waffenschmied by Albert Lortzing, Marzelline in Beethoven's only opera Fidelio, Anna in The Merry Wives of Windsor by Otto Nicolai, Gretel in Hänsel und Gretel and that of Cio-Cio-San in Madama Butterfly by Puccini.
