= Josef von Manowarda =

Austrian opera singer

Josef von Manowarda (3 July 1890 in Kraków – 24 December 1942 in Berlin) was an Austrian operatic singer (bass and Heldenbaritone).

== Life ==
Manowarda was born in Kraków, the son of the Austrian general Eberhard Manowarda von Jana. He first prepared himself for a diplomatic career in Vienna, but then studied philosophy in Graz. Early on he received violin lessons, in Graz and also speech and singing lessons.

In 1911–15 he was engaged in the Graz Opera, in 1915–18 at the Wiener Volksoper, and from 1919 to 1934 at the Wiener Staatsoper. According to the Salzburg Festival: history and repertoire, 1922-1926 he appeared at the Salzburg Festival. He was professor at the Vienna Music Academy.

Manowarda had joined the NSDAP together with his wife before 1933 and remained politically active even after the party ban in 1933 by distributing propaganda material to the staff of the Vienna State Opera and refusing to wear the badge of the Vaterländische Front despite threats of severe punishment. According to his own statements, this caused him political difficulties, which is why he moved to the Berlin State Opera under Clemens Krauss in 1935.

Already in 1931 he sang his way to great success at the Bayreuth Festival as the Landgrave in Tannhäuser under Arturo Toscanini. After his move to Berlin, Manowarda was particularly popular with Adolf Hitler and Joseph Goebbels and used this attention to propose in 1936 to Heinz Tietjen the unification of the Staatstheaters of Berlin and Kassel with the Burgtheater and the Vienna State Opera. However, the project was never realized due to internal power distribution struggles of the National Socialist leadership elite; further petitions to Hitler also remained unsuccessful. More appearances in Bayreuth followed until 1942, among them as Gurnemanz in the 1937 production of Parsifal.

Manowarda was married to the opera singer Cornelia "Nelly" Pirchhoff-Manowarda.

He is buried at the In den Kisseln cemetery in Berlin Bezirk Spandau.

== Awards ==
Manowarda was awarded the honorary title of Kammersänger in 1929.

After Manowarda's death, a funeral service was held at the Berlin State Opera in January 1943, attended by Goebbels and Hermann Göring. In Göring's speech, Manowarda was described as a "faithful, uncompromising and victory-believing henchman of the Führer". The coffin of the singer stood on the stage of the Berlin State Opera Unter den Linden on the orders of Hermann Göring at this funeral service.
