= Alfred Roller =

Austrian painter, graphic designer, and set designer

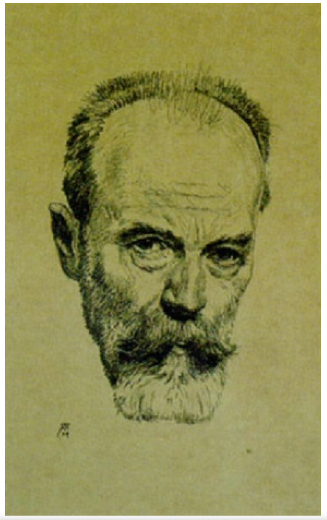
Self-portrait (1921)

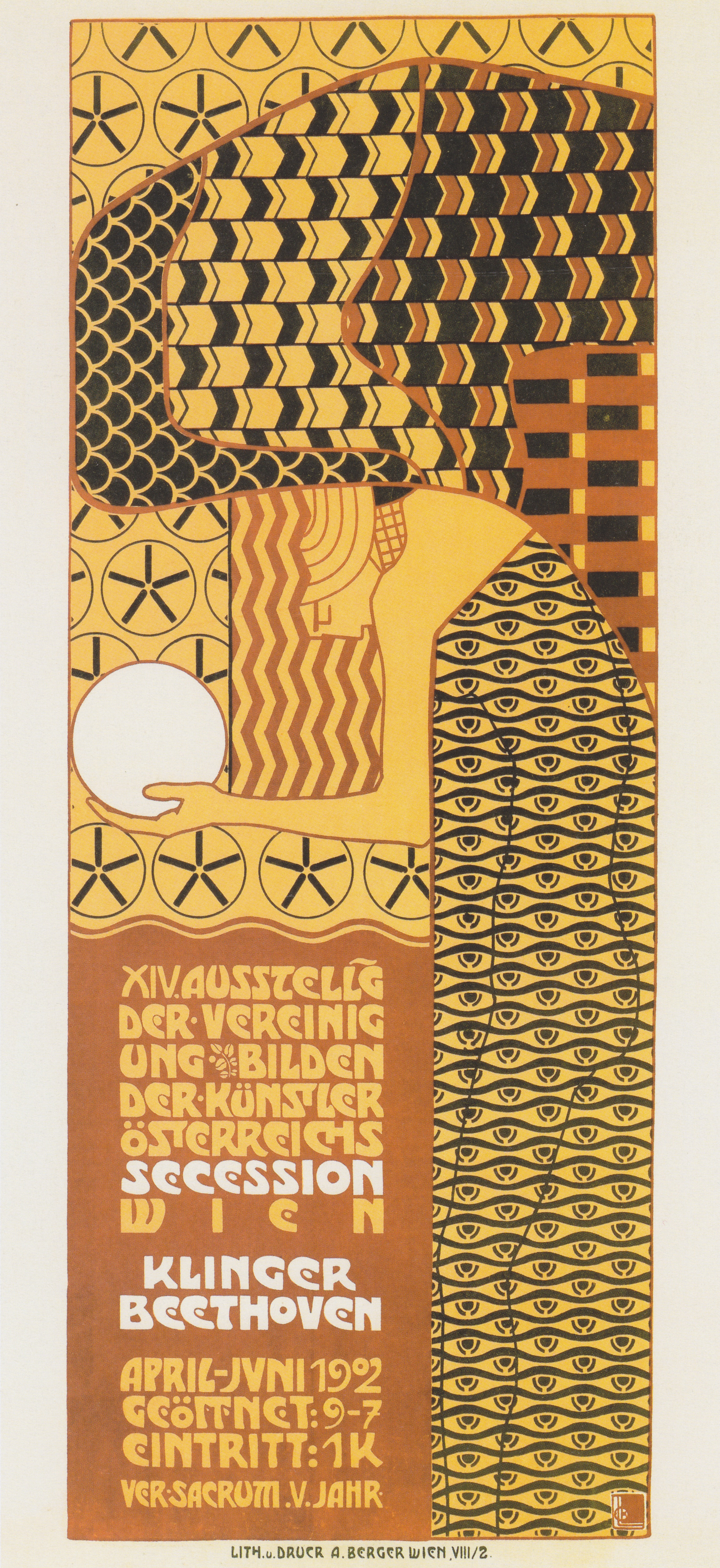
Alfred Roller (1902), poster for the 14th exhibition of the Viennese Secession

Alfred Roller (2 October 1864 – 21 June 1935) was an Austrian painter, graphic designer, and set designer. His wife was Mileva Roller and they were members of the Viennese Secession movement.

== Life and work ==
Roller was born in Brünn (Brno), Moravia. He at first studied painting at the Academy of Fine Arts in Vienna under Christian Griepenkerl and Eduard Peithner von Lichtenfels, but eventually became disenchanted with the Academy's traditionalism. In 1897 he co-founded the Viennese Secession with Koloman Moser, Joseph Maria Olbrich, Josef Hoffmann, Gustav Klimt, and other artists who rejected the prevalent academic style of art. He became a professor of drawing at the University of Applied Arts Vienna (Kunstgewerbeschule) in 1899, and president of the Secession in 1902.

In his early career, Roller was very active as a graphic designer and draughtsman. He designed numerous covers and vignettes for the pages of the Secessionist periodical Ver Sacrum, as well as the posters for the fourth, fourteenth, and sixteenth Secession exhibitions. He also designed the layout of the exhibitions themselves. Some of his work, particularly the lettering, influenced later psychedelic concert poster art.

In 1902 Roller was introduced to the composer Gustav Mahler by Carl Moll. Roller expressed an interest in stage design and showed Mahler several sketches he had made for Wagner's Tristan und Isolde. Mahler was impressed and decided to employ Roller to design the sets for a new production of the piece. The production, which premiered in February 1903, was a great critical success. Roller continued to design sets for Mahler's productions. In 1906 he married the Viennese Secession painter Mileva Roller and they had two sons: Dietrich (1909–2001) became a doctor, while Ulrich (1911–1941) became a stage designer and died in Stolpovo near Kaluga (in the Soviet Union) shortly after Christmas 1941.

Eventually, Roller left the Secession and his teaching post at the Kunstgewerbeschule to be appointed chief stage designer to the Vienna State Opera, a position he held until 1909. He died in Vienna in 1935.

Alfred Roller's brother-in-law was the World War I flying ace Raoul Stojsavljevic (1887–1930).
