= Dominik Peterlini =

Austrian musician and choir leader

Dominik Josef Peterlini (4 April 1875 – 8 April 1944) was an Austrian musician and choral conductor.

== Life ==
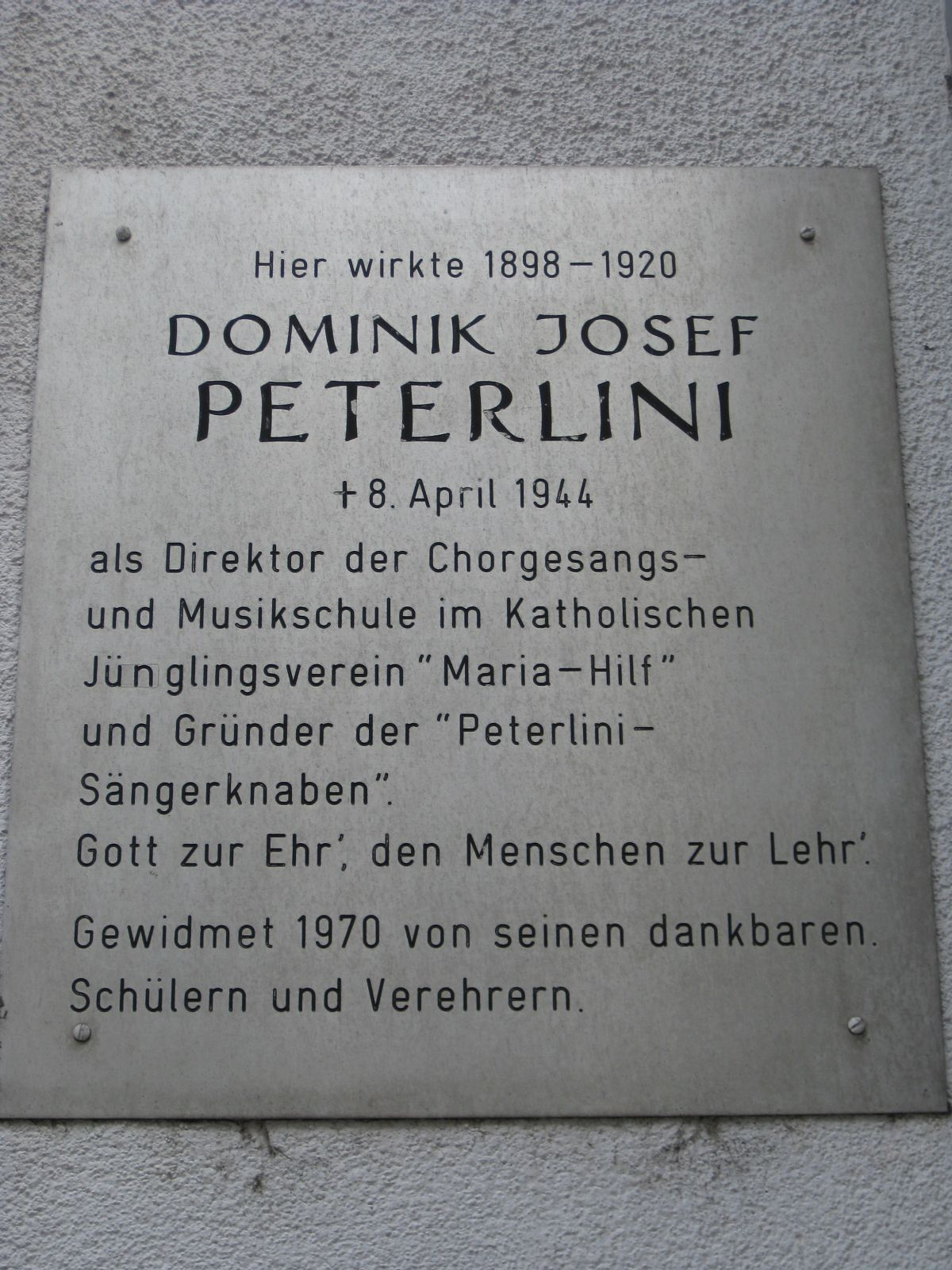
Memorial plaque for Dominik Peterlini at Westbahnstraße 40

Born in Vienna, Peterlini came from a family of South Tyrolean manufacturers and was born in the 7th district of Vienna, Mariahilfer Straße 6. He grew up in a wealthy family home, his father Andreas Peterlini was a cane and straw chair manufacturer, his mother Katharina (married Brandstetter) traded as a field and straw chair manufacturer. Peterlini received music lessons at an early age, initially violin lessons from his father, later completing his studies with Franz Xaver Haberl and Michael Haller in Regensburg as well as Albanus Schachleiter in Prague. Around 1890, Peterlini founded and conducted a small orchestra with students of the Vienna Conservatory. The Peterlini Boys' Choir, which he founded in 1895, was a boys' choir that later developed into the Vienna Boys' Choir. In 1919, Peterlini built a "rest home" for the Boys' Choir at his country estate in Mauer, Vienna. From 1925 to 1932, Peterlini was a professor at the Vienna Music Academy, during which time he also founded a children's singing school in Mauer. From the 1890s, he worked in Viennese churches as choir director, initially in the Capuchin Church and Altlerchenfelder Pfarrkirche, later in the Jesuit Church and Lazaristenkirche and finally until 1939 in the Laimgrubenkirche.

Peterlini died in Vienna at the age of 69 and was buried on 14 April 1944 at the Friedhof Mauer. In 1954, in his honour in the Liesing Mauer district, the Peterlinigasse was named after him; before that, the street was called Draschegasse, which is why it had to be renamed in the course of the redefinition and renumbering of the Liesing municipal district to avoid street name redundancies, as a Draschestraße already existed in the Inzersdorf district. At Westbahnstraße 40 in the district of Neubau, a memorial plaque commemorates Peterlini's work as "director of the choir singing and music school in the Catholic Boys' Association "Maria-Hilf" and founder of the "Peterlini Boys' Choir". There is also a commemorative plaque at Lange Gasse 96 in Mauer, where Peterlini last lived. His estate is in the music collection of the Austrian National Library.

== Awards ==
- Große Goldene Salvatormedaille der Stadt Wien
