= Richard Mayr =

Austrian opera singer (1877–1935)

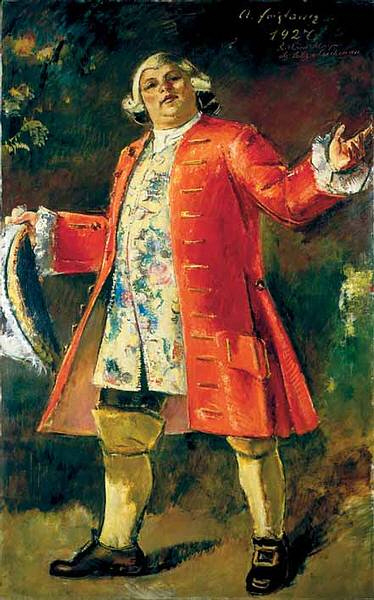
Richard Mayr im Kostüm des Ochs auf Lerchenau - A 1927 portrait of Mayr by Anton Faistauer at the Museum der Moderne Rupertinum.

Richard Mayr (18 November 1877, in Henndorf – 1 December 1935, in Vienna) was an Austrian operatic bass-baritone who was particularly admired for his performances in works by Wolfgang Amadeus Mozart, Richard Wagner and Richard Strauss. He notably created the role of Barak, the Dyer in the world premiere of Strauss's Die Frau ohne Schatten.

== History ==
Mayr studied medicine in Vienna before being persuaded by Gustav Mahler to pursue a career as a singer. After studying at the Vienna Music Academy for several years, he made his professional opera début to critical acclaim at the Bayreuth Festival in 1902 as Hagen in Wagner's Götterdämmerung. This led to his being engaged as a principal singer at the Vienna Hofoper by Mahler where he enjoyed a highly successful career that lasted for three decades. His first role in Vienna was Silva in Giuseppe Verdi's Ernani. Mayr also sang at the Royal Opera, London from 1911 to 1913 and again from 1924 (when he made his second début at the house in 1924 in one of his signature roles, Baron Ochs in Der Rosenkavalier) to 1931. He sang for three consecutive seasons at the Metropolitan Opera in New York City, making his Met début as Pogner in Die Meistersinger von Nürnberg in 1927. He was also a mainstay at the Salzburg Festival, appearing every year there from 1921 until his retirement from the stage in 1934.

He is buried at St. Peter cemetery in Salzburg.

== Roles created ==
- Quasimodo in Notre Dame by Franz Schmidt (Vienna, 1 April 1914)
- Barak in Die Frau ohne Schatten by Richard Strauss (Vienna, 10 October 1919)
