= Franz Schalk =

Austrian conductor

External audio
- Shellac recordings with Franz Schalk in the Online Archive of the Österreichische Mediathek

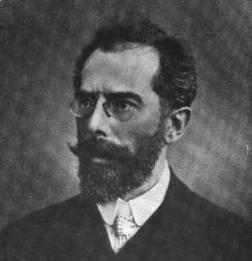
Franz Schalk

Franz Schalk (27 May 1863 – 3 September 1931) was an Austrian conductor. From 1918 to 1929 he was director of the Vienna State Opera, a post he held jointly with Richard Strauss from 1919 to 1924. He was later involved in the establishment of the Salzburg Festival.

== Life and career ==
Born in Vienna, he studied under composer Anton Bruckner. From 1900, he was first kapellmeister of the Vienna Court Opera (Hofoper). Between 1904 and 1921, he was head of the Gesellschaft der Musikfreunde in Vienna. In 1918 he became director of the Vienna State Opera (Staatsoper, successor to the Hofoper), but from 1919 shared the directorship with Richard Strauss, with the well-known composer considered "blatantly (though unofficially) the 'greater equal' of the pair" (despite Schalk's recorded renditions of the Beethoven and Schubert 8th Symphonies virtually as distinguished as Strauss' versions of the last three Mozart symphonies, Beethoven's 5th & 7th, and some of the best-known German overtures). Tensions resulting from unclear division of responsibility between the two men eventually led to Strauss's resignation.

Schalk's most famous quote is "Every theatre is an insane asylum, but an opera theatre is the ward for the incurables."

Today, he is best known for his association with Anton Bruckner. He gave the premiere of Bruckner's Symphony No. 5 in 1894, but with numerous cuts and alterations thought by most authorities to have been made without Bruckner's approval. (The composer was too ill to attend the premiere.) Schalk's version of the Fifth Symphony was the one chosen for first publication, and was the only version heard by audiences for almost forty years. While many critics have attacked him for his alterations of the original versions of many of Bruckner's most important symphonies, others credit him for popularizing great works which might otherwise have remained unknown. Present-day conductor Leon Botstein is a prominent advocate of Schalk's versions of Bruckner's music, as was Hans Knappertsbusch.

Schalk was also involved in the early publication of Mahler's Symphony No. 10. Schalk gave the premiere of Richard Strauss's opera Die Frau ohne Schatten in 1919.

He died in 1931, aged 68. Some of his work as a conductor has been preserved and is available on CD. Schalk's elder brother Joseph was also a prominent conductor and musician.
