= Claire Born =

German opera singer (1898–1965)

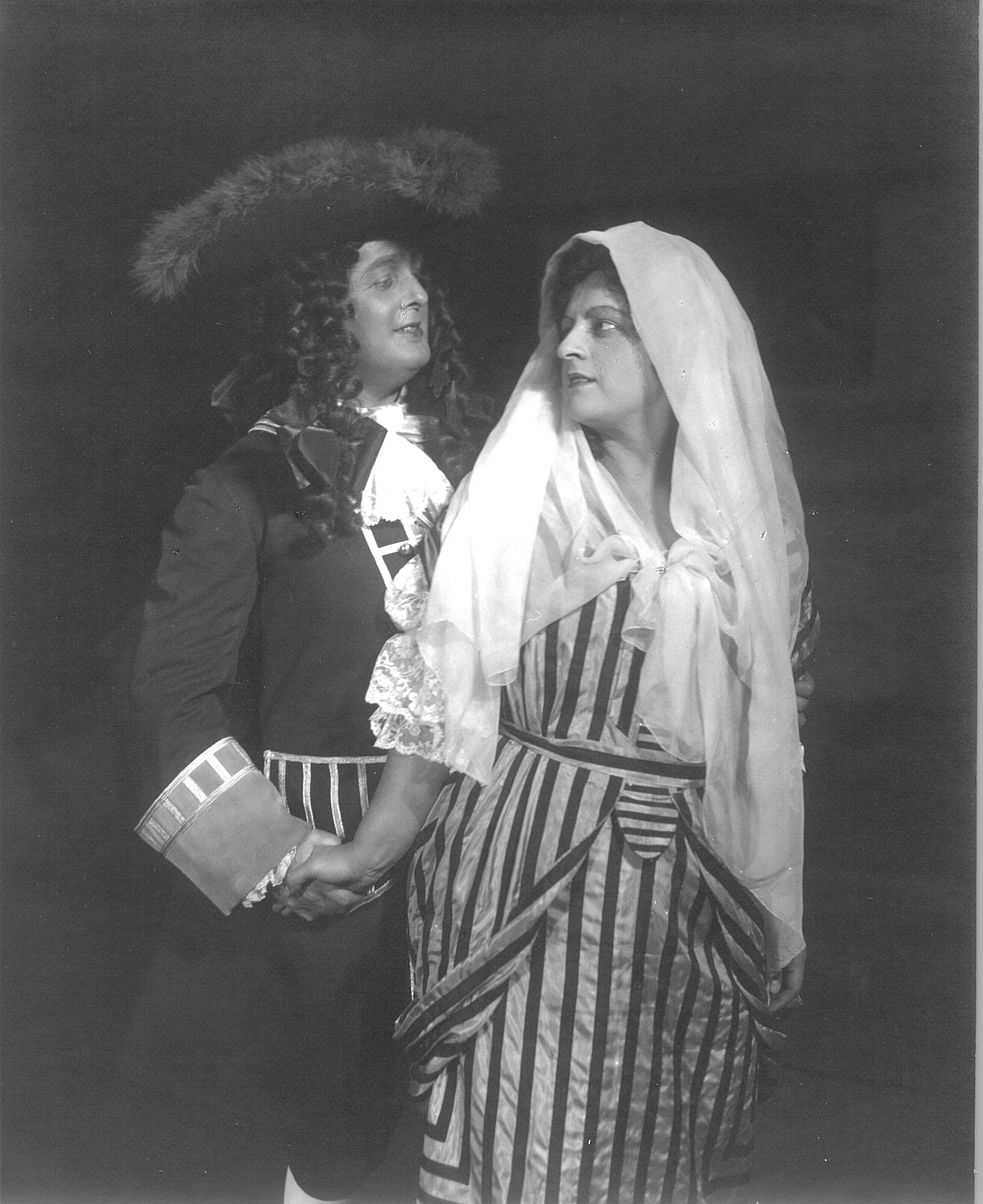
- Cardillac in 1926. Max Hirzel as the Officer and Born as Cardillac's daughter
- Born: 17 February 1898; Bayreuth, Bavaria
- Died: 28 December 1965 (aged 67); Vienna, Austria
- Occupations: Operatic soprano; Voice teacher
- Organizations: Vienna State Opera; Semperoper

Claire Born (17 February 1898 – 28 December 1965) was a German operatic soprano. A long-term member of the Vienna State Opera and the Semperoper in Dresden, she appeared at leading international opera houses and festivals, in roles such as Donna Elvira in Mozart's Don Giovanni, Eva in Wagner's Die Meistersinger von Nürnberg and the title role of Ariadne auf Naxos. She performed in world premieres including Hindemith's Cardillac and Othmar Schoeck's Vom Fischer un syner Fru.

== Career ==
Born in Bayreuth, Born received her voice training in Chemnitz and Vienna. She began her artistic career in 1917 at the Theater Chemnitz where she worked until 1920. From 1920 to 1929 she belonged to the Vienna State Opera. She was especially successful with roles of the lyric-dramatic soprano repertoire, such as the Countess in Mozart's Le nozze di Figaro, Pamina in his Die Zauberflöte, Agathe in Weber's Der Freischütz, and Rosalinde in Die Fledermaus by Johann Strauss.

She appeared with the Vienna State Opera in Amsterdam in 1924 in the title role of Ariadne auf Naxos by Richard Strauss, In 1925, she was Donna Elvira in Mozart's Don Giovanni at the Paris Opera. She made her Bayreuth Festival debut that year, as Eva in Die Meistersinger von Nürnberg and as Gutrune in Götterdämmerung. She performed at the Salzburg Festival, as the Countess in Figaro between 1922 and 1929, as Donna Elvira between 1922 and 1927, and as Ariadne in 1926.

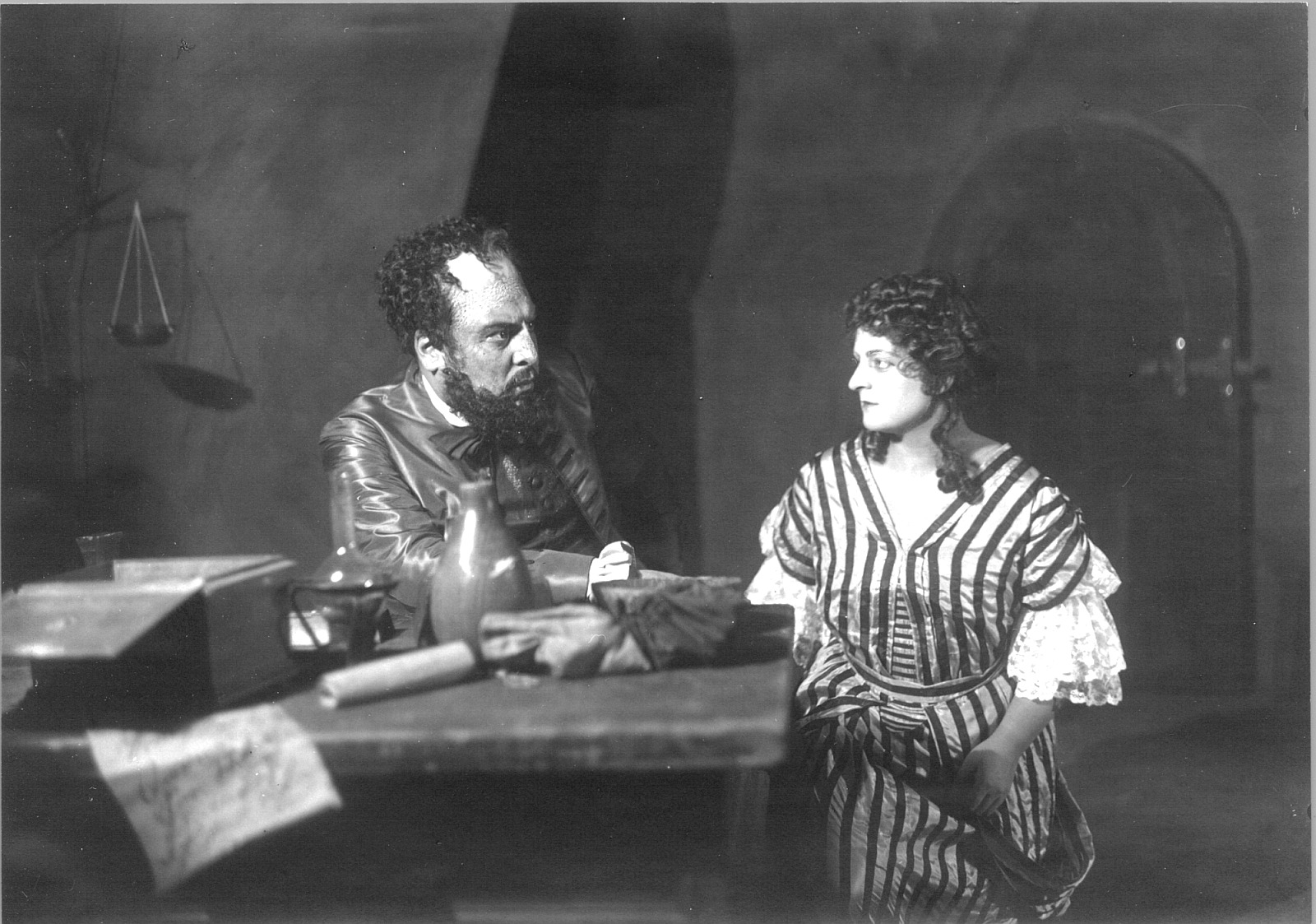
Cardillac, 1926. Robert Burg as Cardillac and Born as his daughter

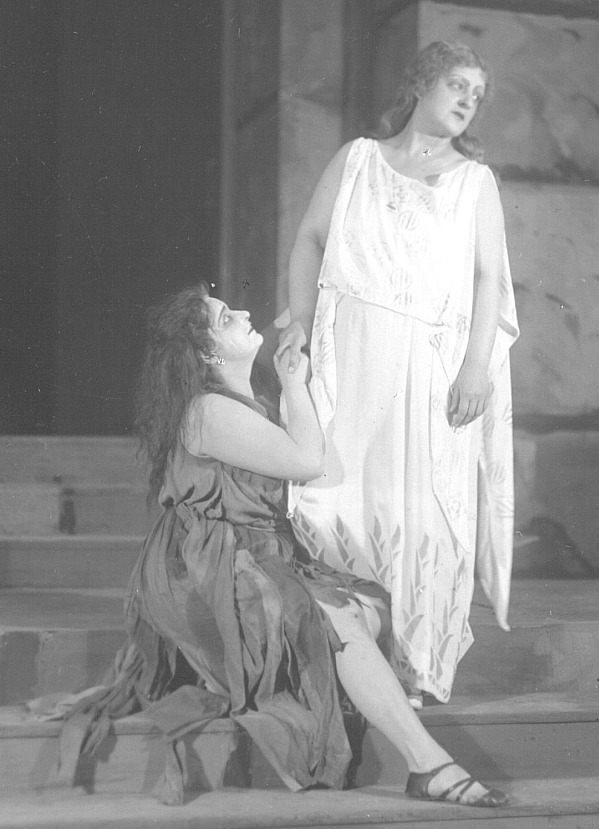
Elektra, 1927. Anna Wolf-Ortner, left, as Elektra and Born as Chrysothemis

From 1926 to 1932, Born was a member of the Dresden Semperoper as one of the leading singers. She performed in the premiere of Hindemith's Cardillac on 9 November 1926 as the Daughter, and in the premiere of Othmar Schoeck's Vom Fischer un syner Fru on 3 October 1930 as Ilsebill, a title character. In 1924 she appeared at the Deutsche Oper Berlin, and in 1935 at the Graz Opera.

Her roles also included Dorabella in Mozart's Così fan tutte, Micaela in Bizet's Carmen, Alice Ford in Verdi's Falstaff, Irene in Wagner's Rienzi, Senta in his Der fliegende Holländer, Elsa in his Lohengrin and both Freia and Fricka in his Das Rheingold, Minneleide in Pfitzner's Die Rose vom Liebesgarten, the Duchess of Parma in Busoni's Doktor Faust, Nedda in Leoncavalo's Bajazzo, Maddalena in Giordano's Andrea Chénier, Lauretta in Puccini's Gianni Schicchi and Suzel in Mascagni's L'amico Fritz.

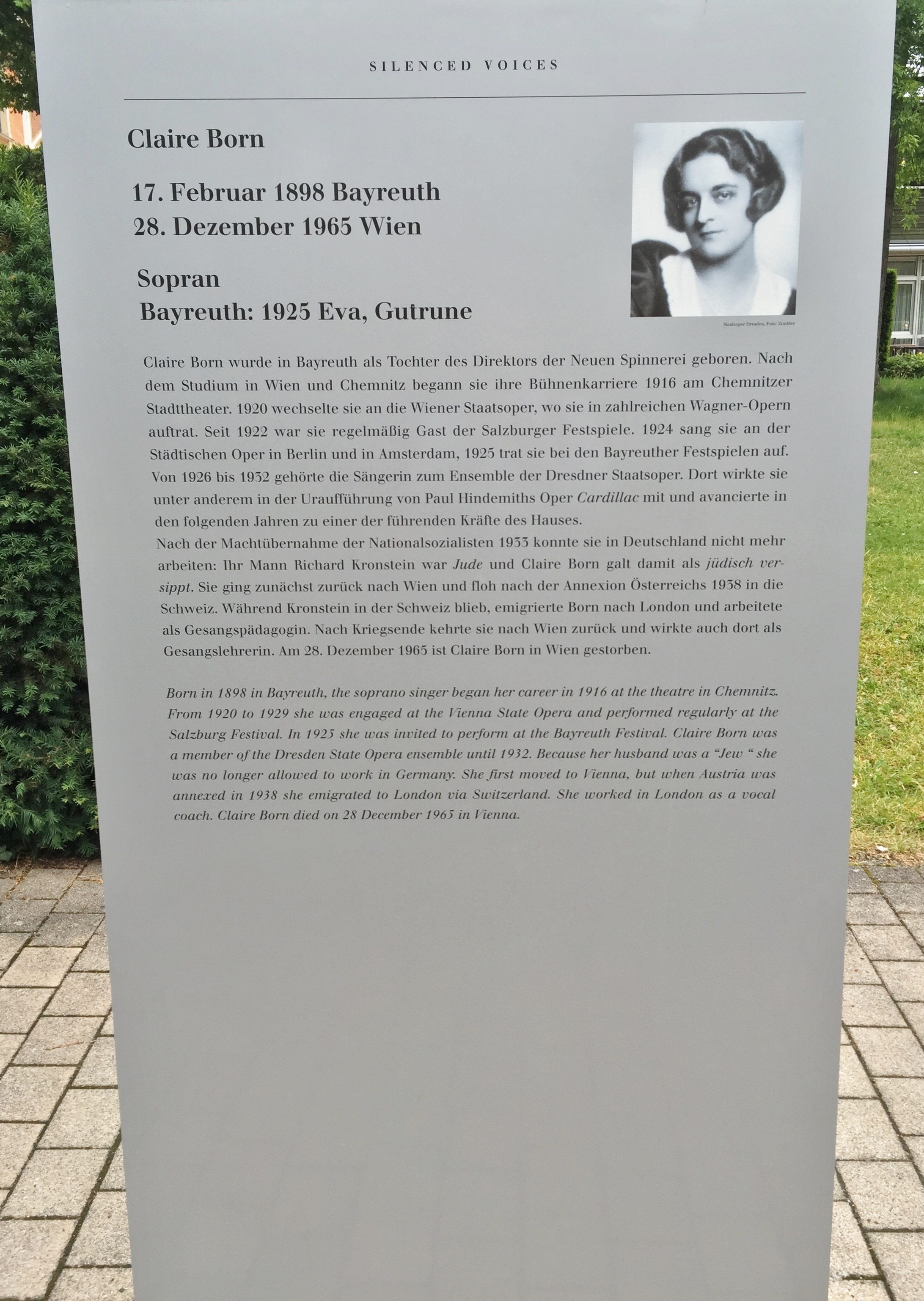
Plaque for Claire Born in Bayreuth

Born was married to the banker Richard Kronstein. Because of her Jewish origin, she had to leave Germany in 1933, and after the Anschluss in 1938 also Austria. She moved to Switzerland and then to London, where she worked as a singing teacher. After the war, she returned to Vienna, where she taught voice from 1946 to 1948. She died there on 18 December 1965.

== See also ==
- Salzburg Festival: history and repertoire, 1922–1926
