= Robert Burg =

German baritone

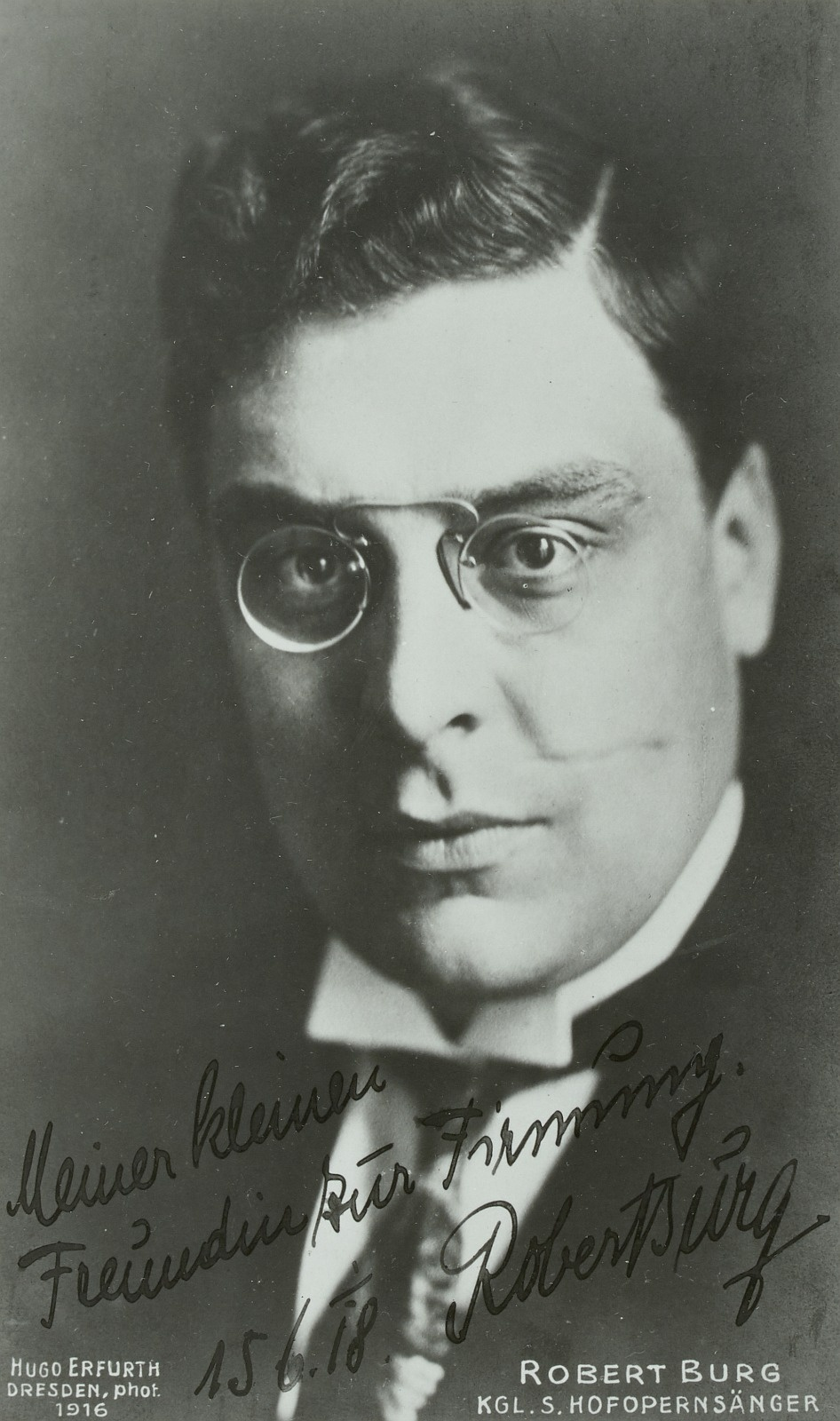
- Signed photograph of Burg, by Hugo Erfurth, 1916
- Born: Robert Bartl; 29 March 1890; Prague
- Died: 9 February 1946 (aged 55); Radebeul, Germany
- Occupation: Operatic baritone
- Organizations: Semperoper; Bayreuth Festival

Robert Burg (29 March 1890 – 9 February 1946), real name Robert Bartl, was a German baritone in opera, concert and recital. He belonged to the opera in Dresden for almost three decades, where he shaped the revival of Verdi operas. He performed in world premieres including the title roles of Busoni's Doktor Faust and Hindemith's Cardillac. Burg also appeared regularly at the Bayreuth Festival and gave international guest performances.

== Life ==
Robert Bartl was born in Prague as the son of a pianist. During his studies of mathematics there, he took singing lessons with the baritone Hans Pokorny. He was a member of the Burschenbunds-Convent "Saxonia Prag" while he studied.

He made his stage debut in Aussig in 1914 as Valentin in Gounod's Faust. In the 1915–16 season, he performed at the German Theatre in Prague and at the Theater Augsburg. He moved the following season to the Dresden court opera (later: Staatsoper Dresden) in 1918, and remained there until it was closed during the Second World War in 1944.

In the 1920s, Burg contributed to the Verdi revival of Fritz Busch at the house. When he appeared in the title role of Mussorgsky's Boris Godunov in 1923, the opera was finally established in the repertoire of German opera houses. He performed in many world premieres at the house, notably in the title roles of Busoni's Doktor Faust in 1925 and Hindemith's Cardillac in 1926. He was awarded the title Kammersänger.

Between 1933 and 1942, Burg appeared at the Bayreuth Festival, especially as Alberich in Der Ring des Nibelungen. He gave guest performances in Berlin and Munich as well as in Amsterdam, Budapest, Prague, Vienna and Zürich, and also gave recitals in towns in Saxony. After the Second World War, Burg gave concerts in the destroyed Dresden and the surrounding area from July 1945. He died the evening before his 32nd stage anniversary, in his dressing room following a lieder recital in Radebeul at age 55.

Burg in operatic roles

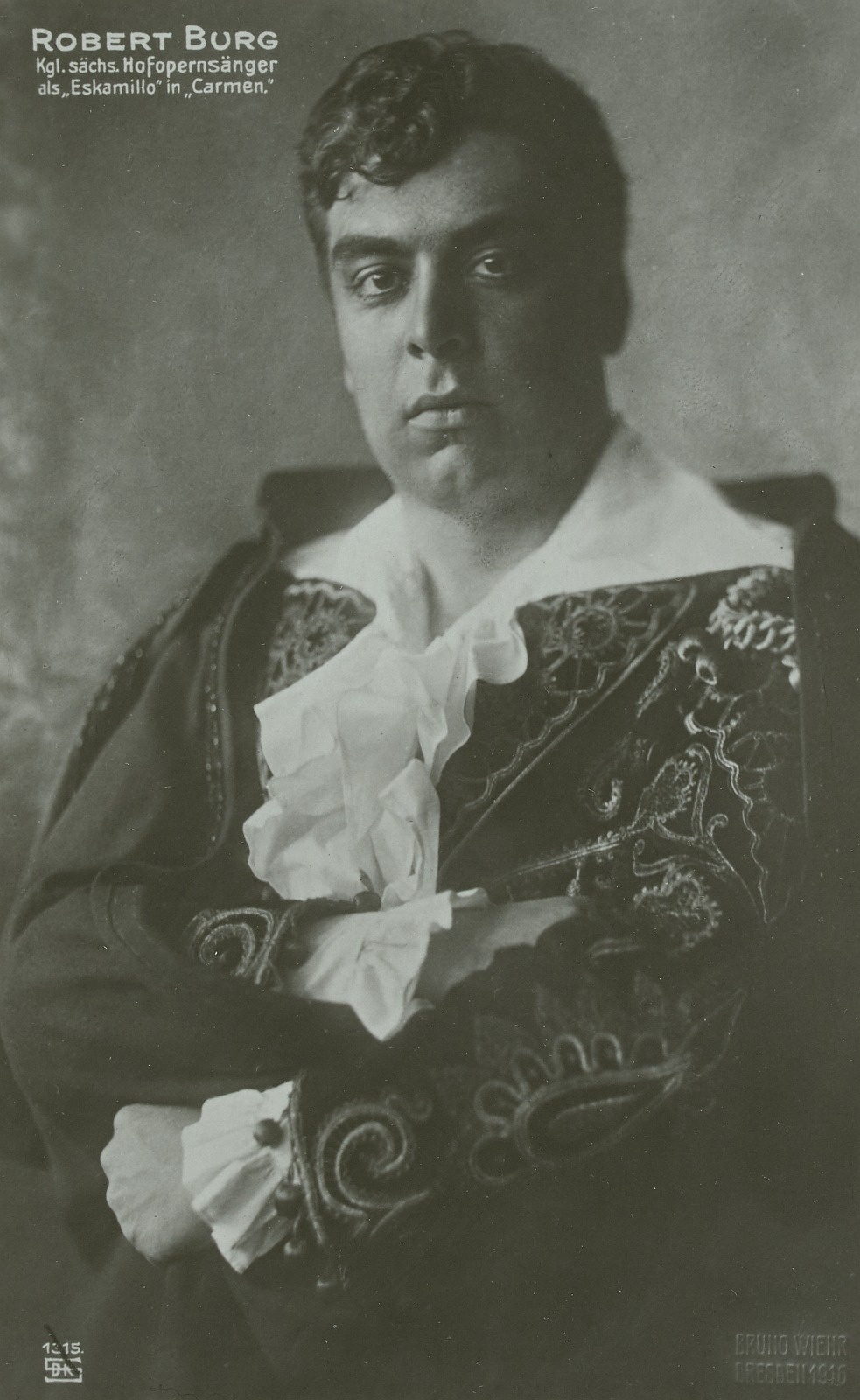
As Escamillo in Carmen, 1916

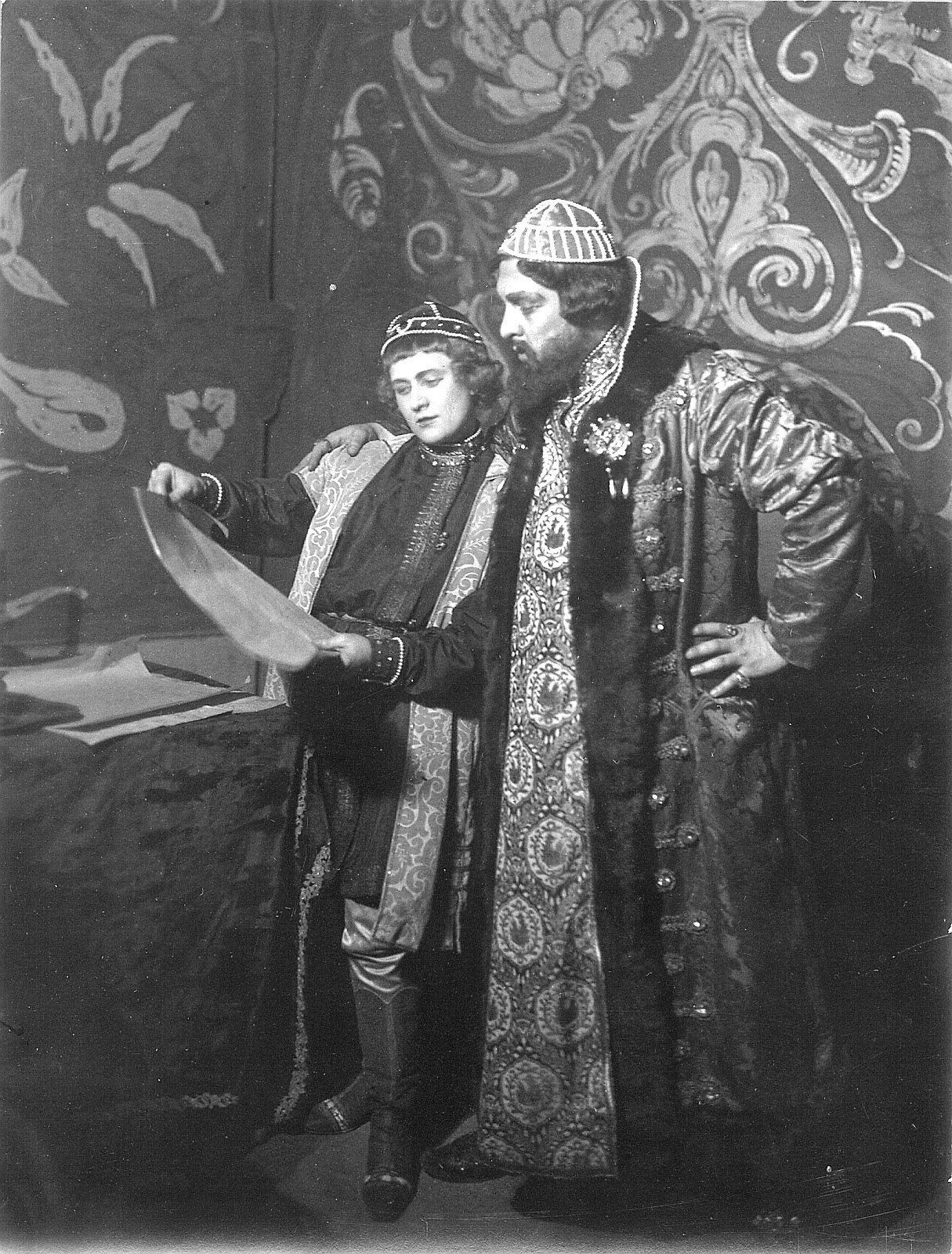
As Boris Godunov, with Grete Merrem-Nikisch as his son Feodor, 1923

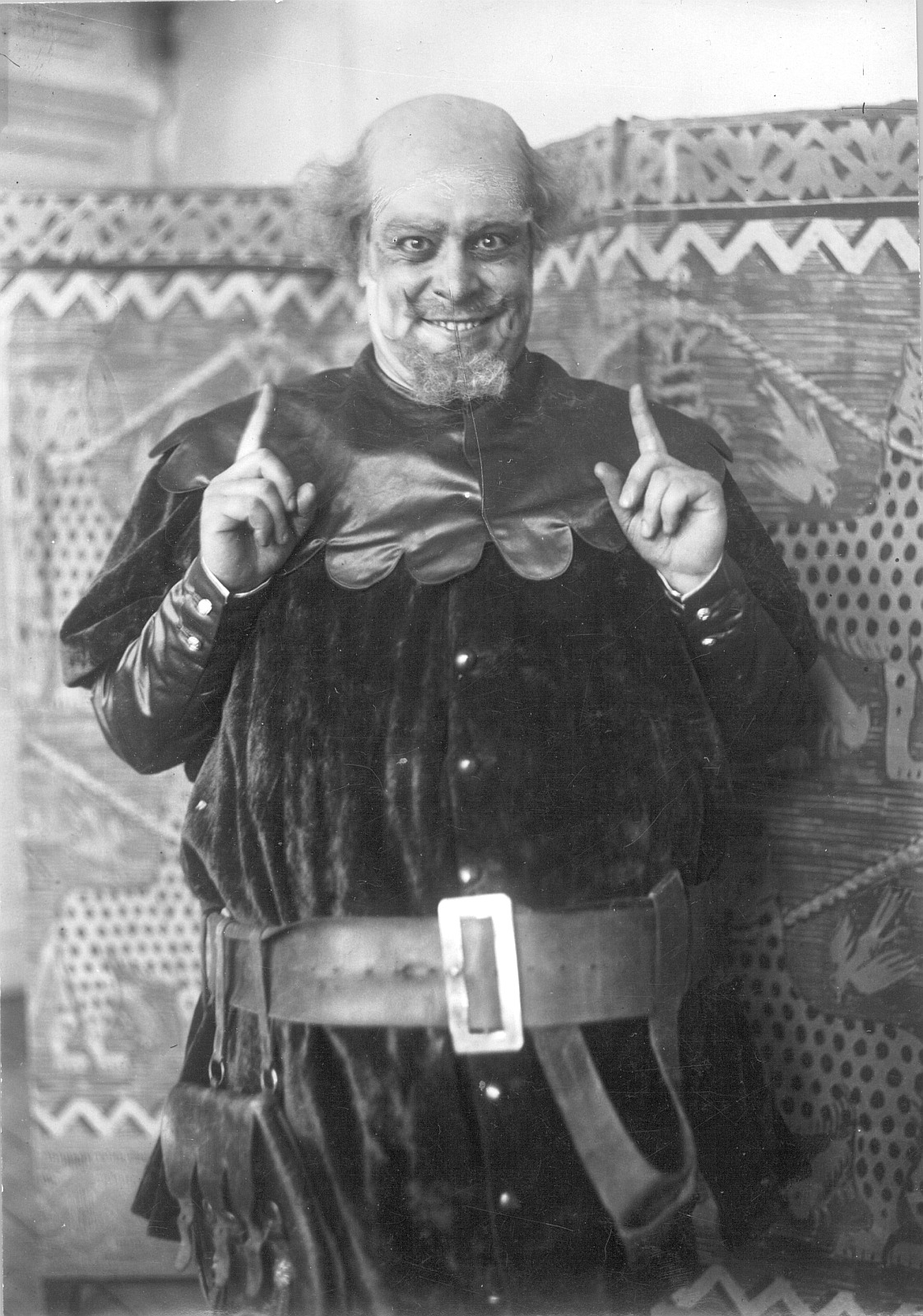
As Falstaff, 1924

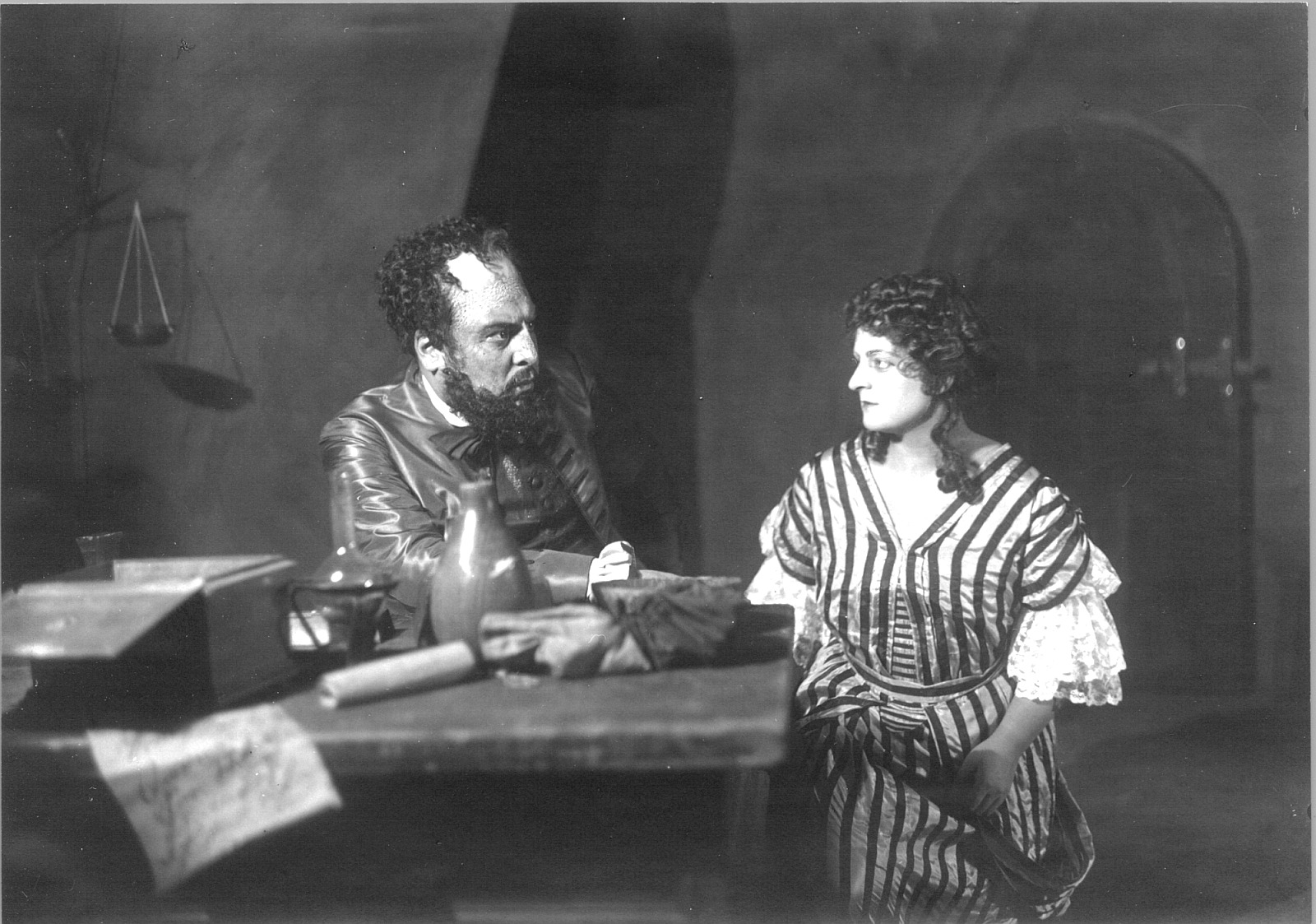
As Cardillac in 1926, with Claire Born as his daughter
