= Maria de Francesca-Cavazza =

German opera singer

Maria de Francesca-Cavazza, born Maria Teresa Cavazza, (born August 1, 1937) is an Italian-born German operatic soprano and voice teacher who grew up in the United States.

== Life and career ==
Maria de Francesca-Cavazza was born with the name Maria Teresa Cavazza in Trieste, Italy on August 1, 1937. She immigrated with her family to the United States in her early childhood. Raised in America, she is a graduate of the Sherwood Conservatory of Music at the Columbia College Chicago where she was a pupil of Maria Hussa-Greve and Garvin Williamson. In 1961, she won the Metropolitan Opera National Council Auditions. Shortly thereafter, she moved to Germany to pursue further studies at the Hochschule für Musik Köln with Margarete Düren.

Francesca-Cavazza made her professional opera debut in 1962 at the Cologne Opera in a minor role, and the following year performed her first leading role with that company as Tsaritsa Militrisa in Nikolai Rimsky-Korsakov's The Tale of Tsar Saltan. She then appeared as a leading soprano at several German opera houses, working as a member of the Opernhaus Wuppertal (1964–1965), the Kiel Opera House (1965–1967), the Staatsoper Nürnberg (1967–1976), and the Staatsoper Stuttgart (1976–1986). As a guest artist, she has made appearances at the Bavarian State Opera, the Bayreuth Festival and the Vienna State Opera, among others. She can be heard and seen in the role of the Cardillac's daughter in Hindemith's opera Cardillac, conducted by Wolfgang Sawallisch, on a 1985 Munich DVD issued by Deutsche Grammophon. De Francesca-Cavazza has taught on the music faculties of conservatories in Munich and Nuremberg.
