= Cardillac =

Opera by Paul Hindemith

- Opera by Paul Hindemith
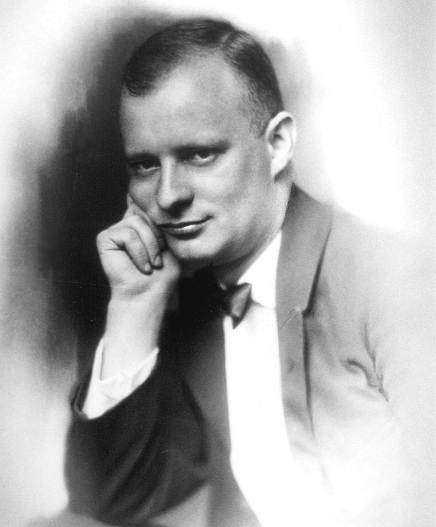
- Hindemith in 1923
- Librettist: Ferdinand Lion
- Language: German
- Based on: Das Fräulein von Scuderi by E. T. A. Hoffmann
- Premiere: 9 November 1926; Staatsoper, Dresden

Cardillac, Op. 39, is an opera by Paul Hindemith in three acts and four scenes. Ferdinand Lion wrote the libretto based on characters from the short story Das Fräulein von Scuderi by E. T. A. Hoffmann. The premiere of the first version at the Staatsoper in Dresden on 9 November 1926 was conducted by Fritz Busch, with Robert Burg in the title role and Claire Born as his daughter.

== Performance history ==
The premiere was at the Staatsoper, Dresden, on 9 November 1926. It was promptly performed throughout Germany. Clarence Raybould led the BBC Symphony Orchestra in a concert performance at the Queen's Hall, London, on 18 December 1936, with Miriam Licette as Cardillac's daughter. The opera's Italian premiere took place in 1948 at the Venice Biennale as part of the Venice Festival of Contemporary Music XI.

Hindemith revised both the score and the text, for the reason that, according to Ian Kemp, the musical idiom "seemed crude and undisciplined". This second version was first performed at the Zürich Stadttheater on 20 June 1952. Hans-Ludwig Schilling has published a comparison of the two versions. After 1953, Hindemith sanctioned only the 1952 revised version for theatrical performances. However, after Hindemith's death in 1963, the original version became available again for production.

The American premiere took place at the Santa Fe Opera in 1967 using a staging by director Bodo Igesz. The New Opera Company presented the first staged UK performances in March 1970 at Sadler's Wells.

== Roles ==
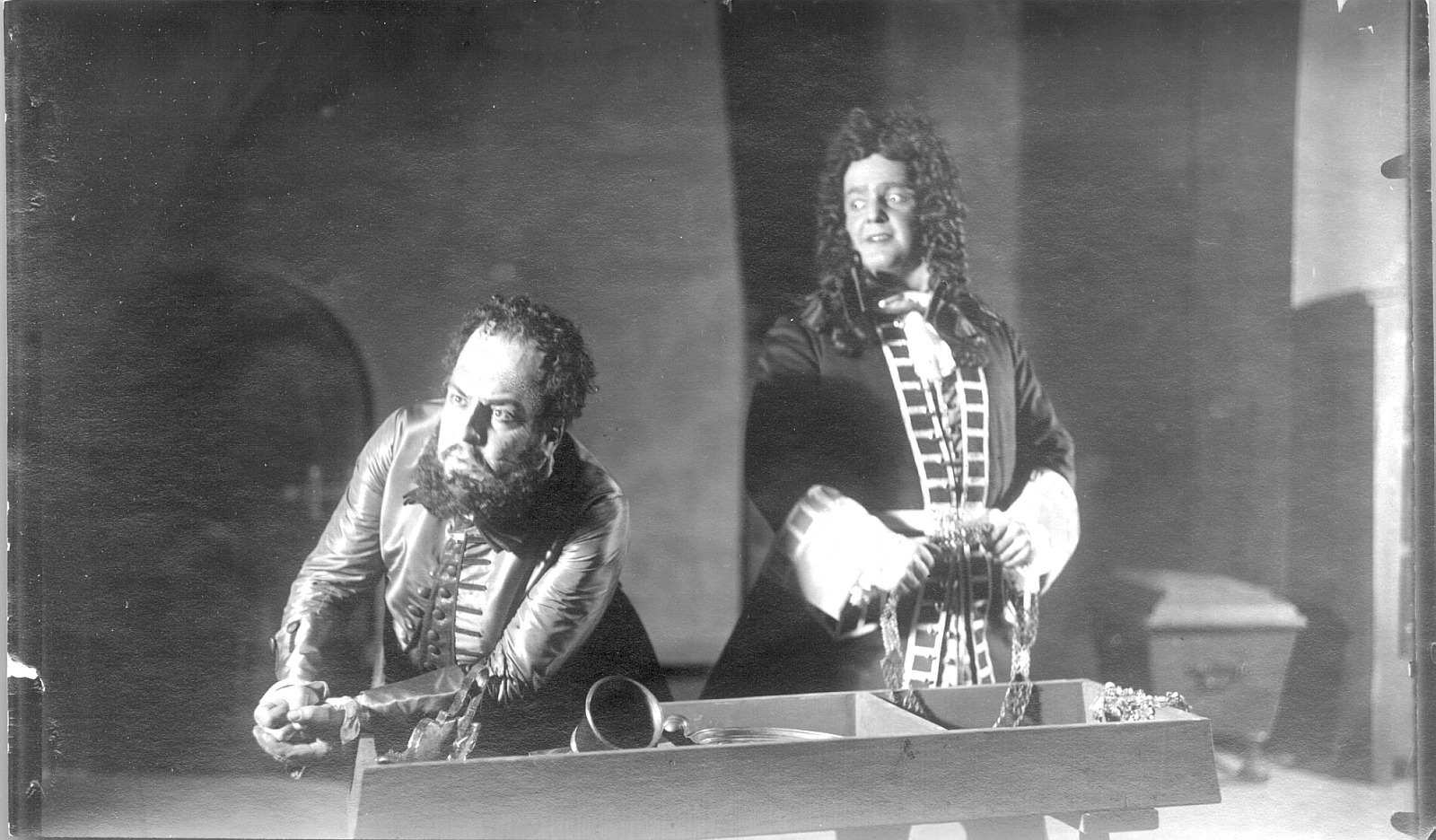
Act 3. Robert Burg as Cardillac and Max Hirzel as the officer

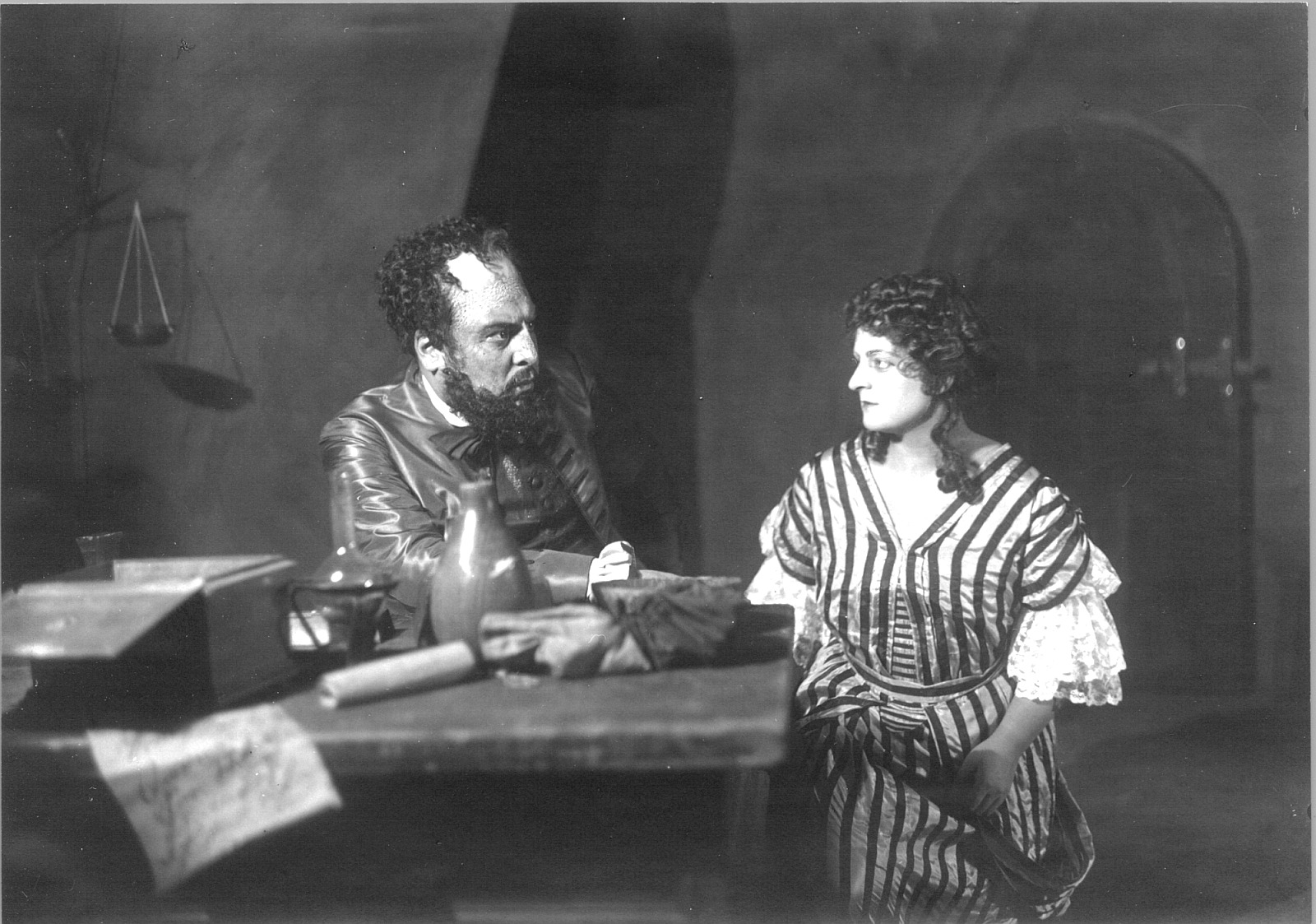
Act 2. Robert Burg as Cardillac and Claire Born as his daughter

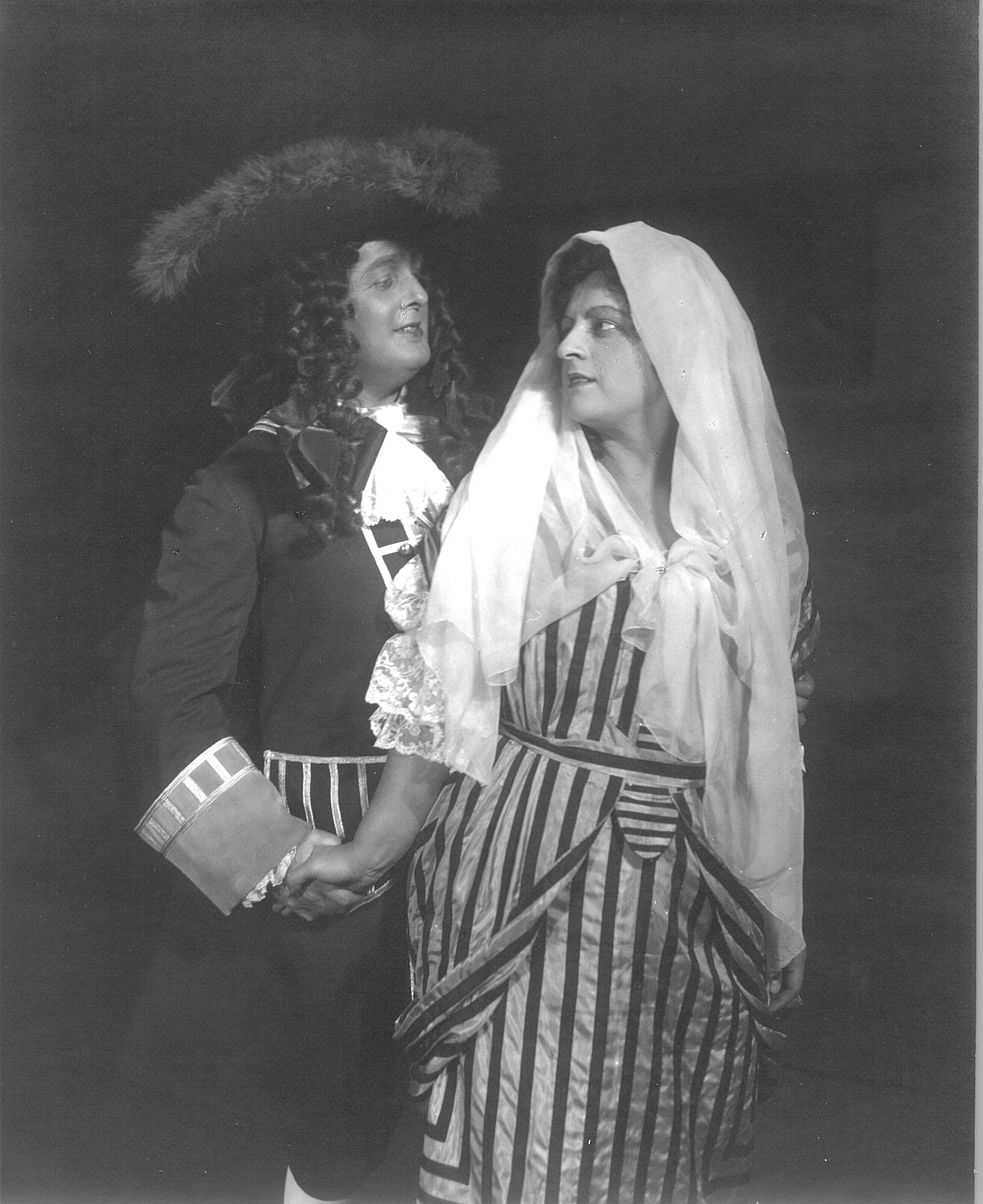
Act 3. Max Hirzel and Claire Born

Roles, voice types, premiere cast
Role	Voice type	Premiere cast, 9 November 1926 Conductor: Fritz Busch
Cardillac, the goldsmith	baritone	Robert Burg
Cardillac's daughter	soprano	Claire Born
The officer	tenor	Max Hirzel
The gold merchant	bass	Adolph Schoepfin
The courtier (cavalier)	tenor	Ludwig Max Eybisch
The lady	soprano	Grete Merrem-Nikisch
Provost marshal	bass	Paul Schöffler

== Synopsis ==
The setting is Paris in the 17th century.

=== Act 1 ===
Scene 1

The crowd is agitated about a series of recent mysterious murders. The police calm the crowd. The goldsmith Cardillac enters the scene and the atmosphere becomes hushed. The Lady asks the Cavalier about the goldsmith Cardillac, and the Cavalier tells of the goldsmith and his priceless jewelry. The Lady promises the Cavalier a tryst that evening if he can bring her Cardillac's most beautiful work.

Scene 2

The Lady and the Cavalier enjoy their tryst and the Cavalier delivers one of Cardillac's belts. A masked figure steals into the bedroom and fatally stabs the Cavalier. The Lady faints and the mysterious figure leaves with the belt.

=== Act 2 ===
The Gold Merchant mentions to Cardillac the latest murder that involved the theft of a recent work of Cardillac. The Gold Merchant has his suspicions about the identity of the murderer. Cardillac orders his daughter to watch over his work. She does so and awaits her lover, the Officer. Cardillac returns, and it becomes clear that he values the articles he has crafted more than he does his daughter. He then meets the King and offers to create his greatest work of art for him. The Officer enters to ask Cardillac for his daughter's hand in marriage, and Cardillac consents. Though the Officer realizes how much Cardillac values his creations over his own daughter, he offers money for one of the goldsmith's chains. After the Officer leaves, Cardillac indicates that he himself is the murderer.

=== Act 3 ===
In a tavern, the Officer wears the chain, presenting himself as a target for the murderer. Cardillac enters and wounds the Officer, but the Officer beats back the attack and holds on to the chain. He advises Cardillac to flee. The Gold Merchant then brings on a crowd and accuses Cardillac of the murders. Cardillac is brought in, followed by his daughter. The Officer defends Cardillac, rebuts the Gold Merchant's accusation, and accuses the Gold Merchant of being the murderer's accomplice. In the ensuing ensemble, Cardillac's daughter realizes her father is the murderer. The crowd sings Cardillac's praises, but as they continue, his words make them wonder about the identity of the murderer. Finally, Cardillac reveals to the crowd that he is the murderer. They demand he repent his crimes, but he makes no such gesture. The crowd then lynches Cardillac. With his final gesture before dying, he reaches out for the chain around the Officer's neck, not his daughter. The Officer and Cardillac's daughter swear mutual devotion.

== Recordings ==
=== Audio ===
- June 19, 1968, live in Cologne: Joseph Keilberth, conductor; Dietrich Fischer-Dieskau, Leonore Kirschstein, Donald Grobe, Karl-Christian Kohn, Eberhard Katz, Elisabeth Söderström, Willi Nett; Cologne Radio Choir; Cologne Radio Symphony Orchestra; (Deutsche Grammophon). This recording is of the original 1926 version.
- 1988; studio recording at Jesus-Christus-Kirche, Berlin, Feb 10-13 and April 8-13: Gerd Albrecht, conductor; Siegmund Nimsgern, Verena Schweizer, Robert Schunk, Harald Stamm, Josef Protschka, Gabriele Schnaut, Andreas Schmidt; backed-up RIAS Chamber Choir; Berlin Radio Symphony Orchestra; (Wergo, (1988)). This recording is of the original 1926 version.
- October 13, 2013, live at Prinzregententheater, Munich: Stefan Soltész, conductor; Juliane Banse, Michaela Selinger, Torsten Kerl, Oliver Ringelhahn, Jan-Hendrik Rootering, Prague Philharmonic Choir, Münchner Rundfunkorchester; issued on CD by BR Klassik in 2023. This recording is of the original 1926 version.

=== Video ===
- 1985: Wolfgang Sawallisch, conductor; Donald McIntyre, Robert Schunk, Maria de Francesca-Cavazza, Hans Günther Nöcker; Chorus of the Bavarian State Opera, Bavarian State Orchestra; Staged and designed by Jean-Pierre Ponnelle; DVD (2008). This recording is of the original 1926 version.
- 2005: Kent Nagano, conductor; Alan Held, Angela Denoke, Christopher Ventris, Hannah Esther Minutillo, Charles Workman; orchestra and chorus of the Opera National de Paris; Bel Air Classiques, (2007). This recording is of the original 1926 version.
