= Das Christ-Elflein =

1917 opera by Hans Pfitzner

- Opera by Hans Pfitzner
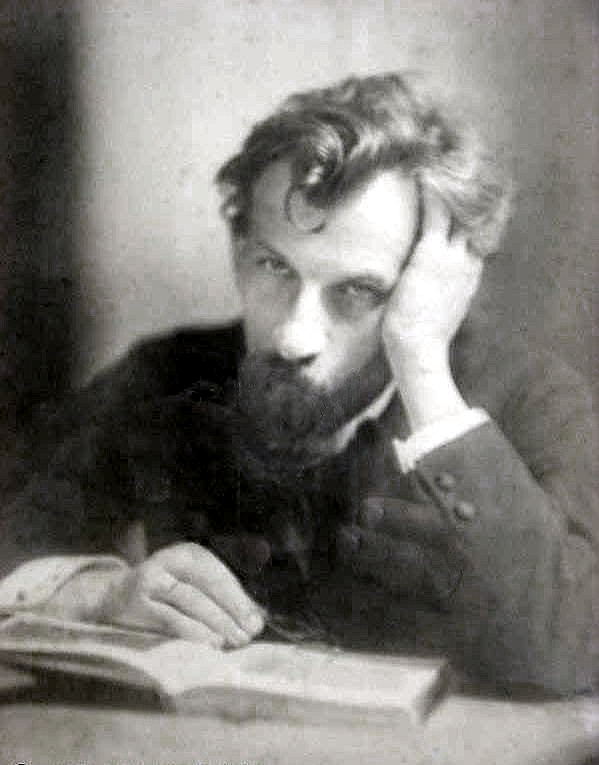
- Hans Pfitzner, the composer of the opera, by Wanda von Debschitz-Kunowski, ca 1910
- Librettist: Hans Pfitzner; Ilse von Stach
- Language: German
- Premiere: 11 December 1917; Königlich-Sächsisches Hoftheater, Dresden

Das Christ-Elflein (The Little Elf of Christ) is an opera in two acts by Hans Pfitzner to a German-language libretto by Pfitzner and Ilse von Stach. The work was originally premiered in 1906 as a Christmas play by von Stach with incidental music by Pfitzner. It was later revised by the composer into a two-act opera (the version performed today) which premiered in Dresden on 11 December 1917.

== Background and performance history ==
Das Christ-Elflein began life as incidental music by Pfitzner for a Christmas fairy-tale play by the German writer Ilse von Stach (Pfitzner's lover at the time). This version premiered on 11 December 1906 at the Royal Theatre in Munich conducted by Felix Mottl with the actress Maja Reubke in the title role.

The premiere was not a success. The German critic Eduard Wahl wrote:

It would fain be simple and childlike; it is childish. It would fain be religious; it is sentimental. ... It would fain be serious; it is in bad taste, it is ridiculous.

During the summer of 1917 Pfitzner revised the work as a two-act Spieloper (comic opera). He adapted and shortened the play and turned some of the speaking and silent roles into ones for singers. The revised version premiered on 11 December 1917 at the Königlich-Sächsisches Hoftheater in Dresden conducted by Fritz Reiner with Richard Tauber as Frieder and Grete Merrem-Nikisch in the title role. Otto Klemperer was an admirer of the work, but Bruno Walter was more dismissive and spoke of it as a "Lernaean serpent [the librettist] who had slain Hercules [the composer]".

The revised version continues to be performed occasionally in German-speaking countries, e.g. by the Hochschule für Musik und Theater Hamburg in 2008, and was heard in Boston for the first time in 1954 when it was given a concert performance in Jordan Hall by the New England Conservatory of Music. The opera was broadcast on German television NWDR in 1955, conducted by Wilhelm Schüchter with Anneliese Rothenberger in the title role, and has subsequently had two more full-length recordings.

== Roles ==
- Christ-Elflein, the little Christ-Elf (soprano)
- Das Christkindchen, the little Christ Child (soprano)
- Tannengreis, "Old Fir Tree", Christ-Elflein's friend (bass)
- Knecht Ruprecht (bass)
- Herr von Gumpach (baritone)
- Frieder, his son (tenor)
- Franz, a servant of Gumpach (bass)
- Jochen, a servant of Gumpach (tenor)
- Trauchten, Frieder's sister (spoken role)
- The village doctor (spoken role)
- Frau von Gumpach, Frieder and Trauchten's mother (silent role)
- Sankt Petrus, Saint Peter (silent role)
- Choruses of village children and angels

== Synopsis ==
Act 1

A forest in midwinter

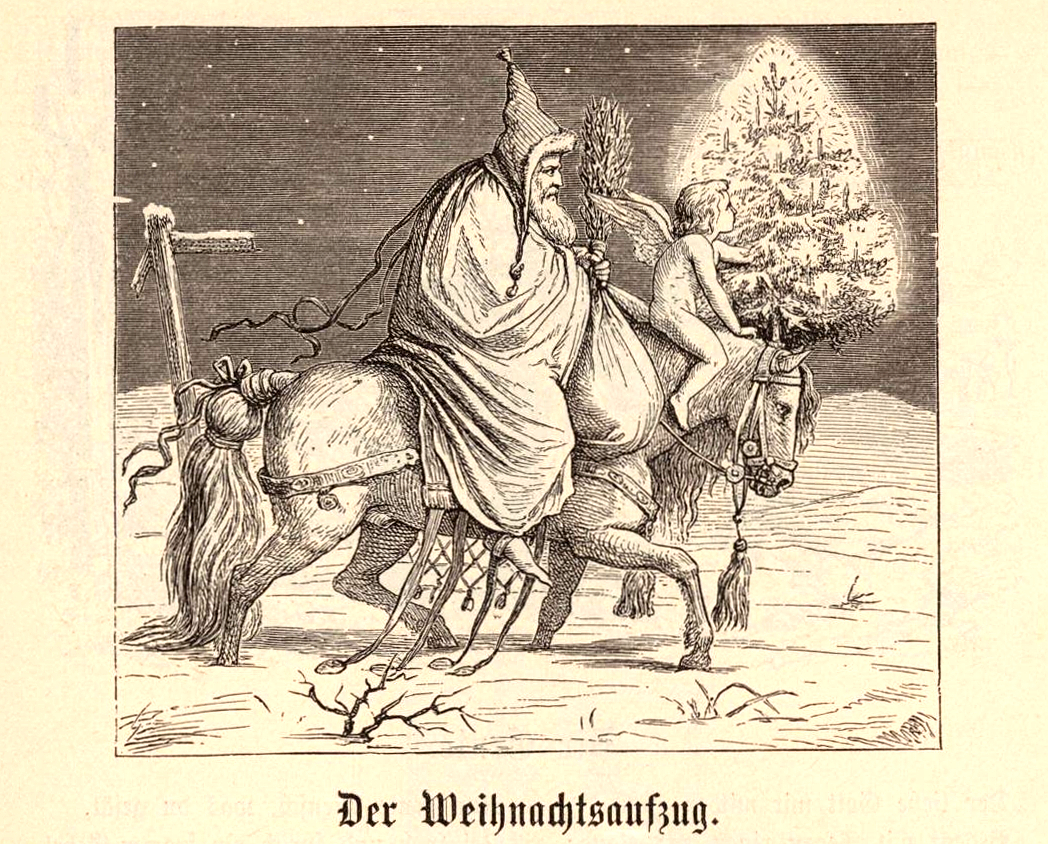
Knecht Ruprecht with the Christ Child

Elflein, a little elf living in the forest, asks his friend Tannengreis, an old tree spirit, why humans ring bells and sing at Christmas and what it all means. Tannengreis expresses his dislike and mistrust of humans. Frieder appears in the forest on his way to the village doctor. His sister Trautchen is dying and he no longer believes in God. He tells the elf that he too has no time for his questions about Christmas.

Franz and Jochen, servants of Frieder and Trautchen's father, enter the forest to cut down a Christmas tree and end up having an encounter with Knecht Ruprecht whom they initially assume is a toy seller and then a warlock.

The Christ Child appears and announces that he will bring Trautchen the Christmas tree this year. Elflein is fascinated by him, but Tannengreis warns him to stay away from humans and their religion. After a dance by young men and forest maidens prevents the servants from cutting down a tree, angels appear to announce that it is Christmas Eve, a holy night. The Christ Child leaves for the von Gumpach house. Elflein goes with him.

Act 2

The von Gumpach house on Christmas Eve

Herr von Gumpach scolds Franz and Jochen for not having returned with a Christmas tree. They protest that they have seen the living Christ Child, but he doesn't believe them and Frieder openly mocks them. Tannengreis comes looking for the little elf and is hidden behind the stove by Frieder. Trautchen is brought into the room, and Knecht Ruprecht arrives with village children to explain the tradition of the Christmas tree.

The Christ Child appears with the little elf bringing the tree for Trautchen but tells everyone that he has also come to bring the sick child to heaven. The elf takes pity on Trautchen and offers to take her place. The Christ Child agrees, grants the elf a soul, and gives permission for him come back to earth every Christmas to visit Tannengreis. His new name will be "Christ-Elflein" (Christ's Little Elf).

Christ-Elflein is brought up to heaven by the angels. Trautchen is cured, Frieder regains his belief in God, and Tannengreis is reconciled to humans. All present join in the Christmas celebrations.

== Recordings ==
- Das Christ-Elflein (with dialogue) – Rundfunkorchester Hamburg conducted by Wilhelm Schüchter with Anneliese Rothenberger as Christ-Elflein (1955) Label: NDR
- Das Christ-Elflein (dialogue replaced with text narrative by Alois Fink) – Münchner Rundfunkorchester conducted by Kurt Eichhorn with Helen Donath as Christ-Elflein, Janet Perry as the Christ Child, and Alexander Malta as Tannengreis (recorded live 30 November 1979, released 1999). Label: Orfeo
- Das Christ-Elflein (dialogue replaced with text narrative by Alois Fink) – Münchner Rundfunkorchester conducted by Claus Peter Flor with Marlis Petersen as Christ-Elflein, Martina Rüping as the Christ Child, and Friedmann Rohlig as Tannengreis (2004). Label: cpo
