= Karl-Christian Kohn =

German opera singer

Karl-Christian Kohn (21 May 1928 in Losheim am See – 20 January 2006) was a German opera singer (bass).

== Life ==
After his education at the Hochschule für Musik Saar from 1949 to 1952 Kohn made his debut at the Stadttheater Saarbrücken (today Saarländisches Staatstheater) in 1952 and afterwards had engagements at the Deutsche Oper am Rhein and in Berlin. In 1958 he became a member of the Bayerische Staatsoper in Munich. He was considered a pillar of the ensemble and appeared in over 2,500 performances. He was honoured by the Bavarian State Opera with the title of Kammersänger.

After the end of his stage career in 1991, he was professor for singing at the Mozarteum in Salzburg until 1998.

He died at the age of 77 in Munich as a result of an injury.

== Stage roles ==
He sang Figaro in Mozart's The Marriage of Figaro more than 400 times all over Europe, including in 1958 for the festive reopening of the Cuvilliés-Theater in Munich, was considered to be his signature role. As a guest he sang, at the Vienna State Opera, the Hamburg State Opera and the Deutsche Oper Berlin as well as with other opera companies. He also gave guest performances in other European countries, e.g. at the Paris Opera, the Gran Teatre del Liceu in Barcelona, where he received the Spanish Critics' Prize, in Brussels and Edinburgh.

He was successful in many great bass roles in Munich; among others he sang Sarastro in Mozart's The Magic Flute, Leporello and the Commendatore in Don Giovanni, Rocco in Beethoven's Fidelio, Philip II. in Verdi's Don Carlos, Hunding in Wagner's The Valkyrie, Escamillo in Bizet's Carmen, Ochs in Richard Strauss' Der Rosenkavalier and Count Waldner in Strauss' Arabella. In a 1958 recording he sang the Grand Inquisitor in Verdi's Don Carlos alongside Gottlob Frick.

Kohn also sang in contemporary operas, including the world premiere of Werner Egk's Die Verlobung von San Domingo nach Heinrich von Kleist.

== Concert repertoire ==
Kohn was also active as a concert singer. Among other things, he was a permanent guest at the concerts of the Münchener Bach-Chor under the direction of Karl Richter, who at his time was the leading Bach interpreter in the Federal Republic of Germany. Kohn was a regular guest at the then popular Munich Sunday concerts.

== Recordings ==
Some of Kohn's opera roles are documented on recordings, including Leporello in Mozart's Don Giovanni (DG), Kaspar in Weber's Der Freischütz (EMI), Tolomeo in Handel's Giulio Cesare (at Melodram), Ariodate in Handel's Serse (at Orfeo), Calendar in Gluck's La rencontre imprévue (at the Hamburg Archive), Kühleborn in Hoffmann's Undine, Wagner in Busoni's Doktor Faust (at DG), Herr Schwarz in Egk's Verlobung in San Domingo (at Orfeo), Gold trader in Hindemith's Cardillac (at DG), Doctor in the first studio recording of Berg's Wozzeck (conductor: Karl Böhm) (at DG), Priest in Carl Orff's Oedipus the Tyrant (at DG). Several of his concert parts have also been published on records, including recordings of Bach's oratorios as well as the bass parts in Haydn's Paukenmesse und Mozart's Requiem.

- CD-Edition KARL CHRISTIAN KOHN – 3 sets with 8 CDs. Hamburger Archiv für Gesangskunst
- Werner Egk: Die Verlobung in San Domingo, with Fritz Wunderlich, Margarethe Bence, Richard Holm, Karl-Christian Kohn; conductor: Werner Egk, Bayerisches Staatsorchester, Orfeo, live recording of the 1963 premiere.
