= Ilse von Stach =

German playwright, novelist and poet

Ilse von Stach (originally Stach von Goltzheim) (17 February 1879 – 22 August 1941) was a German writer.

== Life ==
Born near Borken, von Stach was the daughter of a Lutheran Protestant estate owner. After the early death of her mother, she was raised by relatives in Aurich and in a convent in Altenburg. She then studied in Berlin to become a teacher. After two failed marriages – the second in 1902 to the polar explorer Theodor Lerner, with whom she had two sons (Klaus and Thomas) – she moved to Rome in 1905. There she took a critical look at her Protestant faith and converted to Catholicism in 1908. In the same year she met her third husband, art critic Martin Wackernagel. They married in 1912, settling first in Planegg and later in Leipzig. This union produced theater director Peter Wackernagel (1913–1958) and Maria Elisabeth (born 1919). From 1921 onward the couple lived in Münster where she died at the age of 62.

== Works ==
Von Stach wrote plays, novels, fairy tales, and lyric poetry. Her most famous work, a Christmas play, Das Christ-Elflein (The Christmas Elf), dates to 1906, and shows the literary influence of naturalist writer Gerhart Hauptmann. In the same year, composer Hans Pfitzner set the work to music in an opera of the same title and it was premiered at the Bavarian State Opera.

- Wer kann dafür, daß seines Frühlings Lüfte weh'n (Poems, 1898)
- Das Christ-Elflein (Christmas Tale, 1906)
- Der heilige Nepomuk (Drama, 1909)
- Die Sendlinge von Voghera (Novel, 1910)
- Missa poetica (Poems, 1912)
- Die Beichte (Novella, 1913)
- Haus Elderfing (Novel, 1915)
- Requiem (Poems, 1917)
- Genesius (Tragedy, 1919)
- Tharsicius (Festival Play, 1921)
- Weh' dem, der keine Heimat hat (Novel, 1921; Revised 1931 as Non serviam)
- Griseldis (Drama, 1921)
- Melusine (Drama, 1922)
- Petrus (Comedy, 1924)
- Der Rosenkranz (Gedichte, 1929)
- Die Frauen von Korinth (Dialogues, 1929)
- Der Petrussegen. Erinnerungen und Bekenntnisse (1940)
- Wie der Sturmwind fährt die Zeit (Poems, 1948)
