= Grete Merrem-Nikisch =

German opera singer

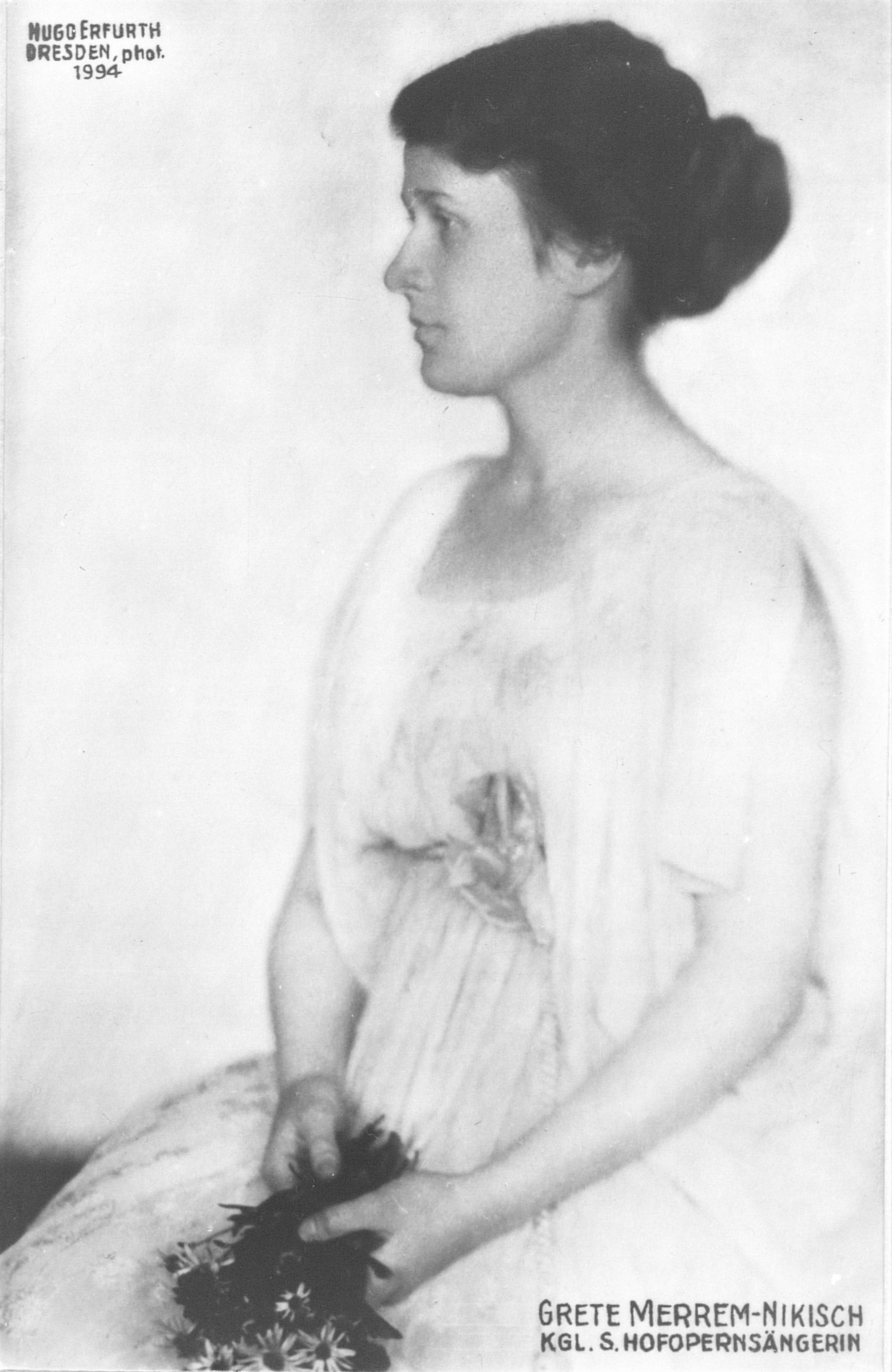
Merrem-Nikisch in 1918

Margarete "Grete" Karoline Merrem, better known by her married name Grete Merrem-Nikisch, (7 July 1887 – 12 March 1970) was a German operatic soprano.

== Life ==
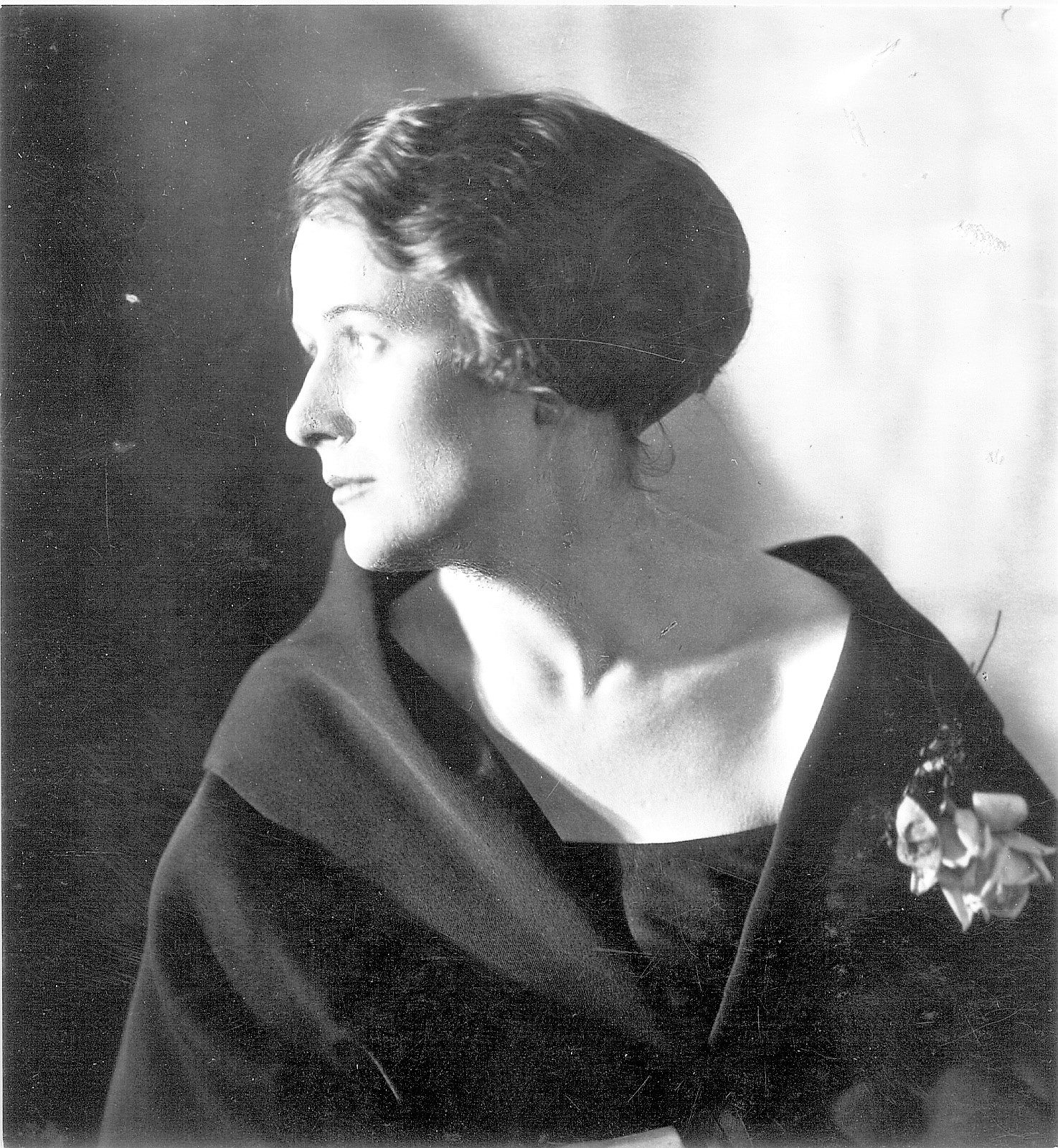
Nikisch in 1930

Born Margarete Karoline Merrem in Düren on 7 July 1887, Grete Merrem was persuaded to pursue a career as a singer after being encouraged to do so by Elena Gerhardt who was the first to recognize her natural gifts as a vocalist. She received her earliest singing lessons from Rudolf Schulz-Dornburg in Cologne and then at the renowned Leipzig Conservatory in Leipzig where she was a pupil of Marie Hedmondt, the wife of tenor E C Hedmondt.

In 1910, Merrem made her professional opera debut at the Leipzig Opera and was a resident singer at the opera house for the next three years. She notably portrayed Sophie in Leipzig's fist staging of Richard Strauss's Der Rosenkavalier in 1911. That same year, she appeared as a guest artist at the Berlin State Opera as the Goose-Girl in Engelbert Humperdinck's opera Königskinder. In 1914 she married the lawyer and jurist Arthur Philipp Nikisch who was the eldest son of conductor Arthur Nikisch and the brother of pianist Mitja Nikisch. After this she performed under the name Grete Merrem-Nikisc.

In 1913, Merrem-Nikisc joined the roster of principal artists at the Semperoper in Dresden; remaining with that company as a resident artist for the next 17 years. She created roles in several world premieres at that operas house; including the parts of the slave Arsinoë in Albert's opera Die toten Augen (1916), the title role in Hans Pfitzner's opera Das Christ-Elflein (1917), Gertraude in Paul Graener's Schirin and Gertraude (1920), and the Lady in Hindemith's Cardillac (1926). In 1924, she replaced an ailing Lotte Lehmann as Christine Storch in the original production of Richard Strauss's Intermezzo; performing the part in the opera's second performance. Her most celebrated parts at the Semperoper were the roles of Eva in Richard Wagner's Die Meistersinger von Nürnberg and Sophie in Der Rosenkavalier. Other roles in her repertoire included Dorabella in Mozart's Così fan tutte, Irene in Wagner's Rienzi, Susanna in Mozart's Le nozze di Figaro, Zerlina in Mozart's Don Giovanni, and the title roles Lehar's The Merry Widow and Puccini's Madama Butterfly. Her last appearance on the opera stage was given at the Semperoper in 1930 when portrayed the part of Veronika in Jan Brandts-Buys's Die Schneider von Schönau.

While primarily active in Dresden, Merrem-Nikisc periodically performed as a guest artist with other European opera houses. In 1914, she performed the role of Eva in Die Meistersinger von Nürnberg for her debut at the Royal Opera House in Covent Garden with her father-in-law conducting. She repeated that role at the New German Theatre in Prague in 1919. Her father-in-law also served as her accompanist in numerous recitals.

Recordings were made with well-known Dresden and Berlin artists such as Karin Branzell, Meta Seinemeyer and Richard Tauber. She can be heard in an acoustic Polydor production of Strauss' autobiographical opera Intermezzo.

Merren-Nikisch died in Kiel on 12 March 1970.

Merrem-Nikisch in dramatic roles

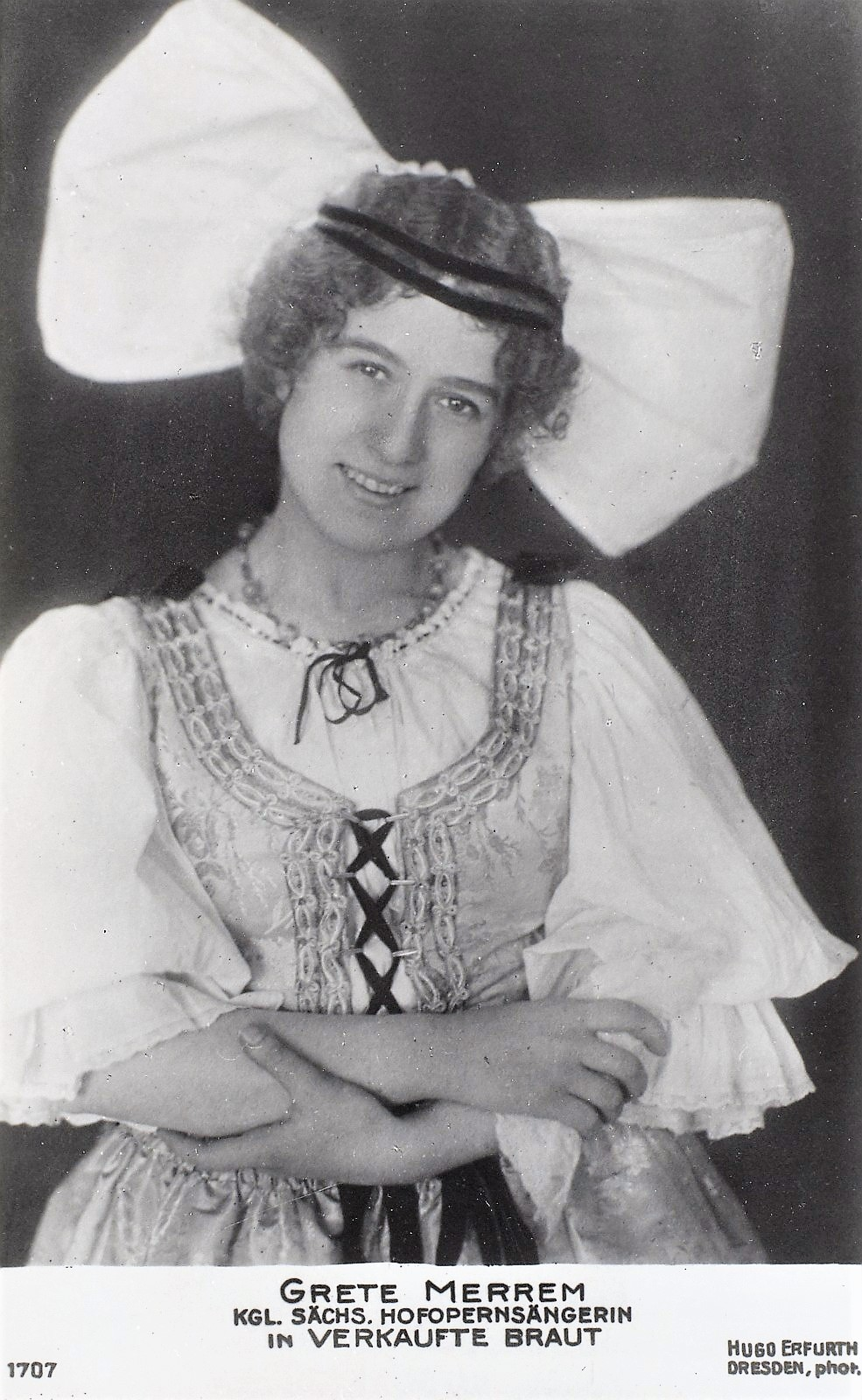
As Marie in The Bartered Bride, 1917

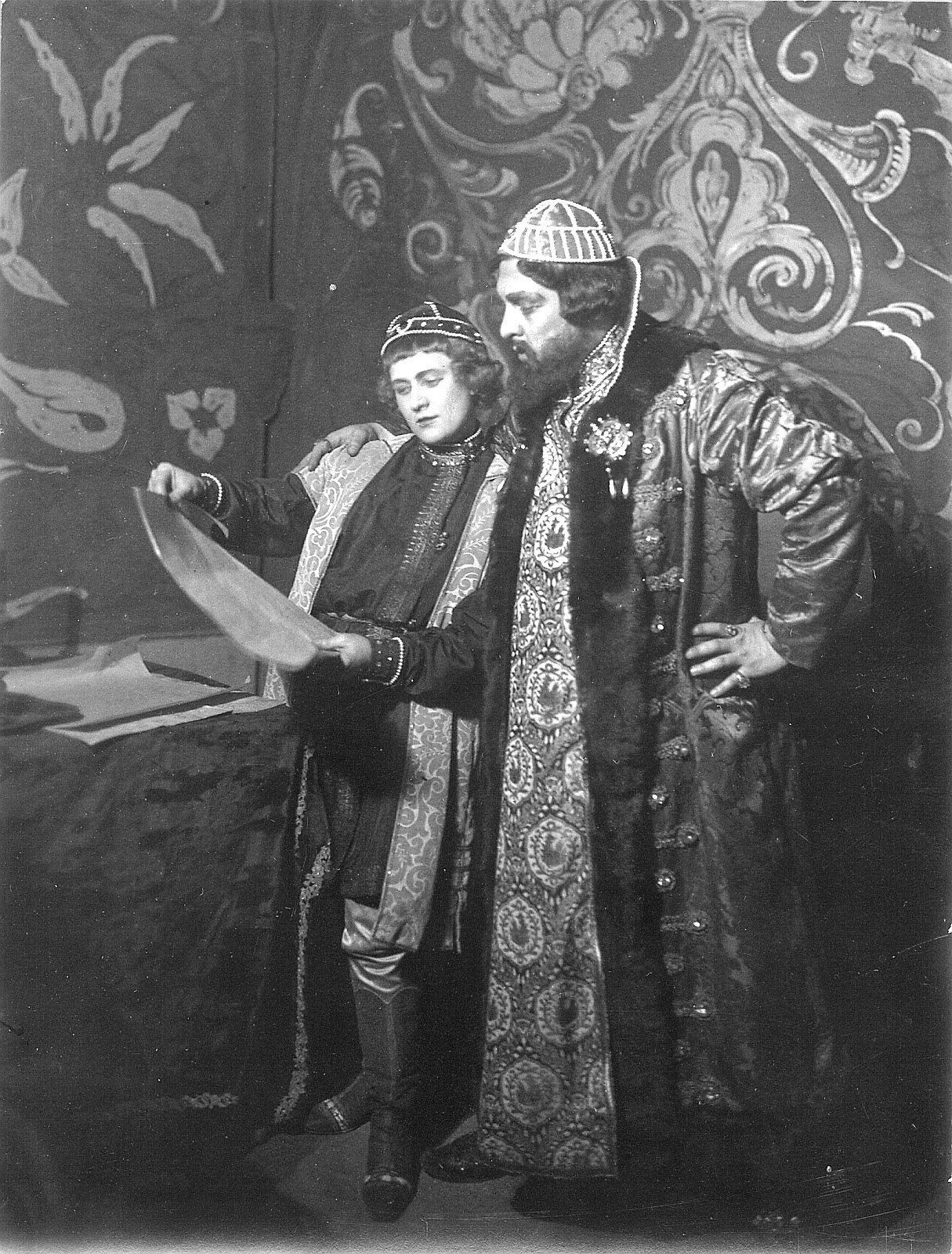
As Feodor, male role, in Boris Godunov, with Robert Burg, 1923

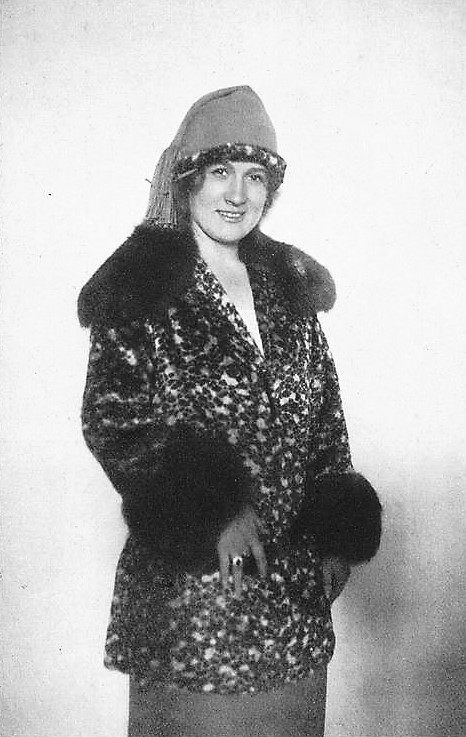
As Christine in Intermezzo, 1924

== Bibliography ==
- Karl-Josef Kutsch, Leo Riemens: Merrem-Nikisch, Grete. In Großes Sängerlexikon. 3rd edition, München 1997–2000, vol. 3, p. 2337
- Elizabeth Forbes: Grete Merrem-Nikisch. In Laura Williams Lacy (editor): The Grove Book of Opera Singers. Oxford University Press, Oxford 2008, p. 319 ()
