= Ruth Ann Swenson =

American soprano (born 1959)

- Born: August 25, 1959 (age 65); Bronxville, New York, U.S.
- Occupation: Operatic soprano
- Years active: 1981–2010
- Spouse: David Burnakus

Ruth Ann Swenson (born August 25, 1959) is an American soprano who is renowned for her coloratura roles.

== Early years ==
Born in Bronxville, New York and raised in Commack, New York on Long Island, Swenson studied at the Academy of Vocal Arts in Philadelphia and briefly at Hartt College of Music in West Hartford, Connecticut. In the early 1980s she joined the Merola Opera Program at the San Francisco Opera and toured the country as Gilda in Western Opera Theatre's Rigoletto.

== Career ==
Swenson made her San Francisco Opera debut in 1983, as Despina in Mozart's Così fan tutte. But her breakthrough role was Dorinda the shepherdess in Handel's Orlando opposite mezzo Marilyn Horne. Her Metropolitan Opera debut came in 1991, as Zerlina in Mozart's Don Giovanni. In 1993, she won the Richard Tucker Music Foundation Award.

Swenson has appeared on many opera stages, including the Opéra National de Paris, the Royal Opera House at Covent Garden, the Metropolitan Opera, the Berlin State Opera, the Grand Théâtre de Genève, the Hamburg State Opera, the Bavarian State Opera and the Chicago Lyric Opera.

Roles she has played include Liù in Turandot, Rosina in The Barber of Seville, the Four Heroines in The Tales of Hoffmann, Elvira in I Puritani, Zerbinetta in Ariadne auf Naxos, Gilda in Rigoletto (49 performances at the Met alone), Juliette in Roméo et Juliette and Giulietta in I Capuleti e i Montecchi, Violetta in La traviata, Lucia in Lucia di Lammermoor, Adina in L'elisir d'amore, Marguerite in Faust, the Countess in The Marriage of Figaro, and Rodelinda in Rodelinda.

Swenson received an honorary doctorate degree in April 2006 from the San Francisco Conservatory of Music, where she has taught master classes.

In March 2007, she returned to the stage of the Metropolitan Opera, singing the role of Marguerite in Faust. The March 17 performance was broadcast internationally. On April 21, 2007, she performed the role of Cleopatra in Handel's Giulio Cesare at the Met. However, Swenson was unhappy with Metropolitan's General Manager Peter Gelb's apparent decision not to use her as much as his predecessor Joseph Volpe had. Swenson stated: "It’s hurtful. I’m a New Yorker. I’ve sung here for many, many years. I’ve had great success. I’ve never let them down. It’s so stressful to get up onstage and realize that the top guy doesn’t like you, and there’s nothing I can do about it. Nothing."

In May 2007 she again sang Marguerite at the Cincinnati Opera, and sang the role of Hannah Glawari in the Dallas Opera's The Merry Widow in November–December 2007 opposite Rod Gilfry.

In June 2008 she sang Ginevra in Handel's Ariodante opposite mezzo Susan Graham at the San Francisco Opera, a production that marked Swenson's 25th anniversary with the company. Also in 2008, she sang Violetta at the Metropolitan Opera.

On July 6, 2008, Swenson was awarded the San Francisco Opera Medal, the company's highest artistic honor. According to David Gockley, General Director of the San Francisco Opera, "Swenson has had a long and illustrious history with this Company, and we are thrilled to honor her significant contributions to San Francisco Opera and the performing arts in this way."

She returned to the Met in 2010 as Musetta in La bohème.

== Personal life ==
Swenson was diagnosed with breast cancer and underwent surgery in October 2006 at Memorial Sloan-Kettering Cancer Center. She received chemotherapy treatment as a precautionary measure following surgery.

Swenson is married to baritone David Burnakus.

== Discography ==
- Marilyn Horne: Divas in Song, RCA Victor Red Seal CD
- Ruth Ann Swenson: Positively Golden, EMI Classics CD
- Gounod: Roméo et Juliette, RCA Victor CD

== Videography ==
- James Levine's 25th Anniversary Metropolitan Opera Gala (1996), Deutsche Grammophon DVD, B0004602-09
