= Marilyn Horne: Divas in Song =

- RCA Victor Red Seal CD 09026 62547 2

Live album by Marilyn Horne
- Released: 1994
- Studio: Carnegie Hall, New York City
- Genre: Classical vocal
- Length: 77:57
- Language: English, French, German, Italian and Spanish
- Label: RCA Victor Red Seal
- Producer: John Pfeiffer

Marilyn Horne: Divas in Song: A 60th Birthday Celebration is a 77-minute live album of art and popular songs performed by Olafur Bjarnason, Montserrat Caballé, Helen Donath, Renée Fleming, Samuel Ramey, Frederica von Stade, Ruth Ann Swenson and Marilyn Horne herself, with piano accompaniment by Manuel Burgueras, Klaus Donath, Warren Jones, Martin Katz and James Levine. It was released in 1994.

== Background ==
The album is made up of excerpts from a gala benefit concert that was held both to honour Horne and to raise money for the Marilyn Horne Foundation, a charity dedicated to preserving the tradition of the classical vocal recital.

== Recording ==
The album was digitally recorded on 16 January 1994 in Carnegie Hall, New York City.

== Packaging ==
The cover of the album, designed under the art direction of Judy Teener, features a photograph of its artists taken by J. Henry Fair.

== Critical reception ==
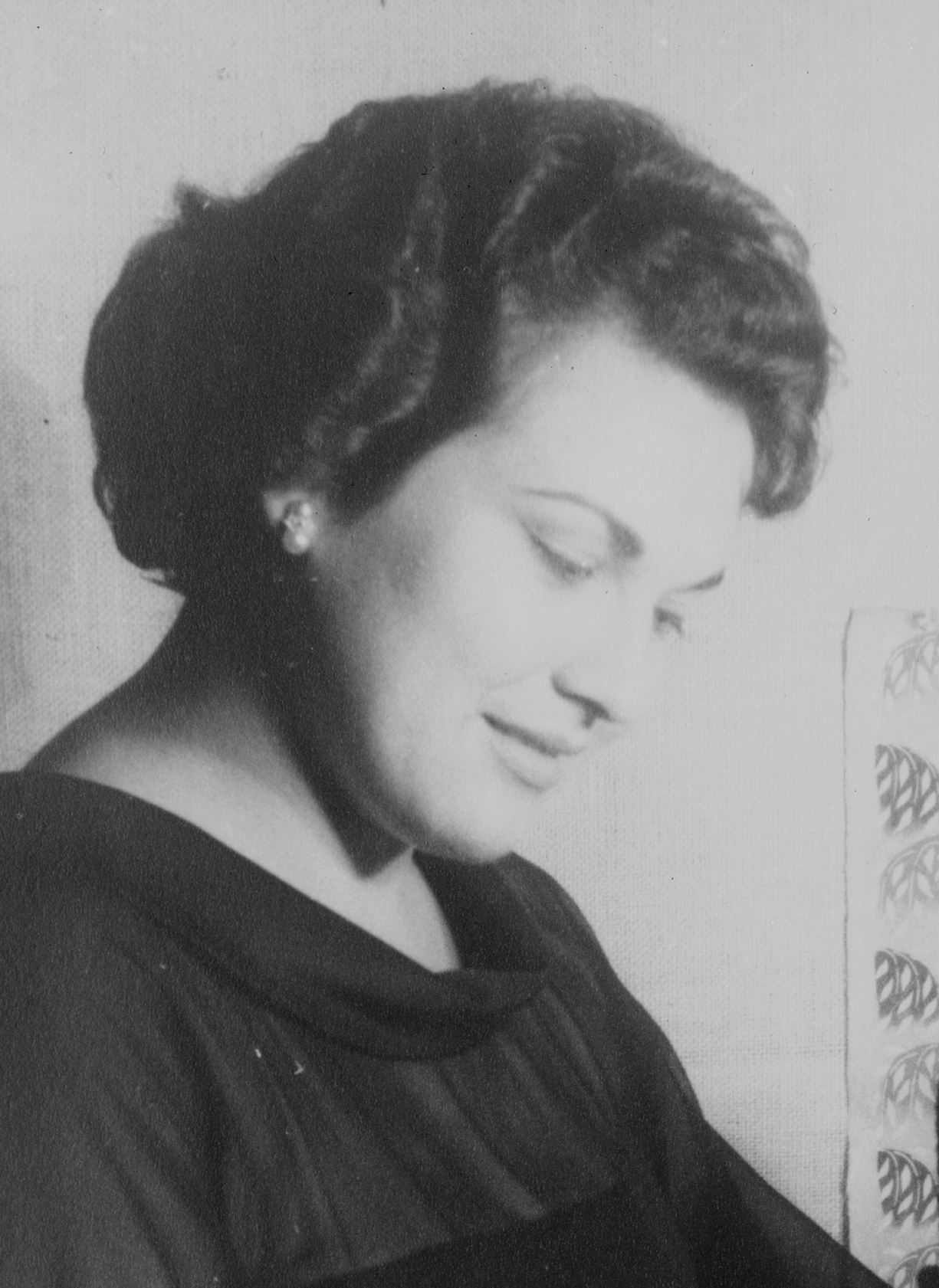
Marilyn Horne photographed by Carl Van Vechten in 1961

Bernard Holland reviewed the concert at which the album was recorded in The New York Times on 18 January 1994. Although Marilyn Horne was in the descending phase of her career, he wrote, her decline was "graceful and dignified", and she still sang "extremely well". Although it was true that her pitch sometimes fell a few Hertz short of what it should have been, she remained an artist who was judicious, skilled in vocal gymnastics and a faithful servant of her poets. The concert's other veteran was very impressive too. Montserrat Caballé might be "giggling and mugging her way toward retirement", but her "glorious blast of soprano sound" was at least some compensation for the "senseless prattle" of her prefatory remarks. The ranks of middle-aged divas were represented by Helen Donath and Frederica von Stade. "Addled and overexcited introductions and unfortunate gyrations around the stage" meant that Donath's presence was "trying", but she brought exemplary diction to her eclectic choice of German items. Von Stade, singing Schubert's "Der Musensohn" and one of Schoenberg's cabaret numbers, projected "high spirits and dark wit" by dint of a similar expertise with words.

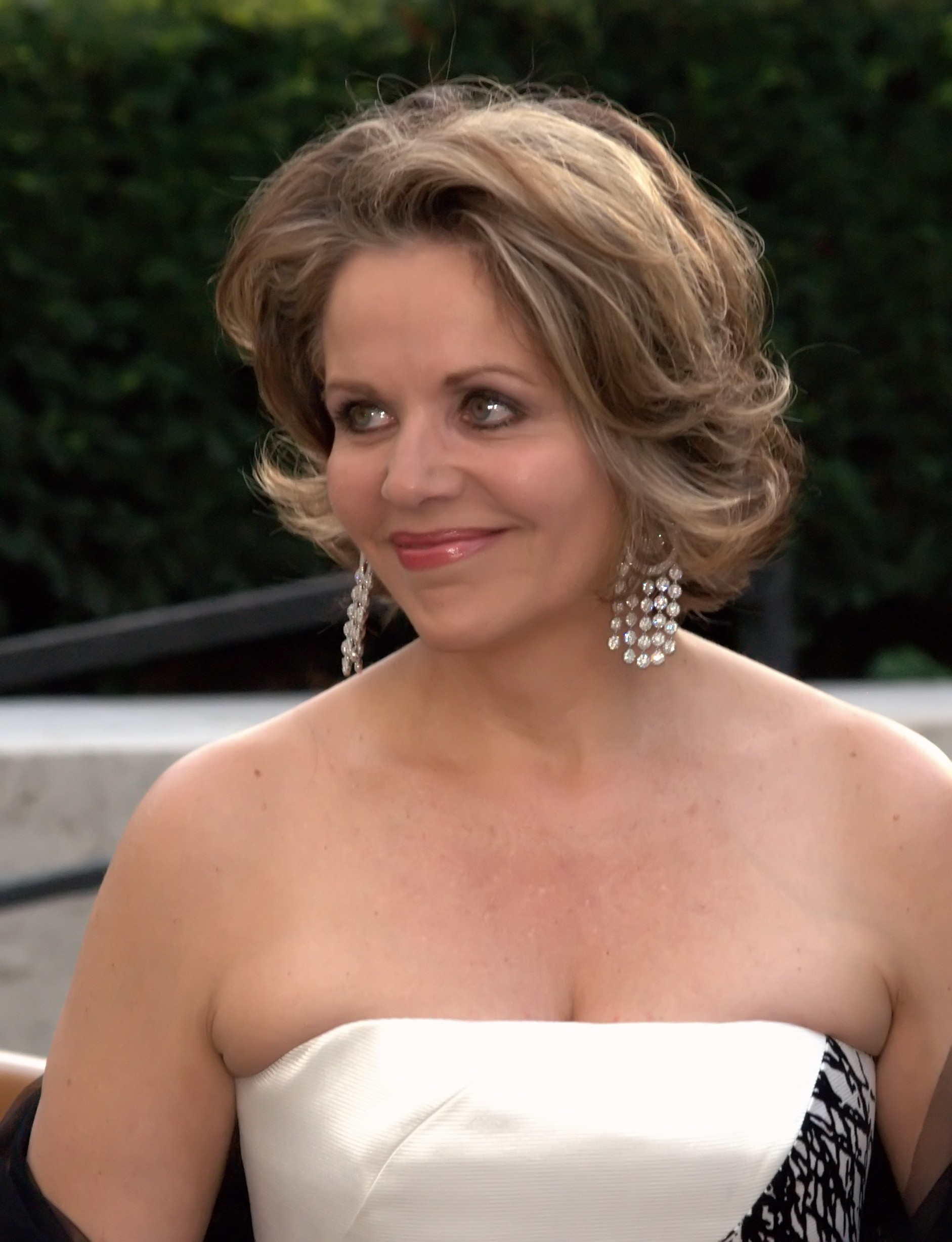
Renée Fleming photographed by David Shankbone in 2009

The concert's younger stars were willing to sacrifice textual clarity on the altar of sheer gorgeousness of sound, and both of them did indeed rise to marvellous heights of beauty. Ruth Ann Swenson "was in astonishing vocal health", with "lovely tone, agility and absolute security amid big complications". Renée Fleming was the day's outstanding performer in a "breathtaking" rendition of Benjamin Britten's "Let the florid music praise", with "music of many moods, movements and colours moving from one to the other with stately confidence and power". All the accompanists played well, Martin Katz and Warren Jones particularly.

J. B. Steane reviewed the album in Gramophone in January 1995. Noting the coincidence that Montserrat Caballé had been born within a few days of the moment at which Marilyn Horne had been conceived, he rejoiced that the two sixty-year-olds could still "bring a glow with them", not least in Horne's performance of "At the river". Helen Donath, Samuel Ramey and Frederica von Stade represented the middle cadre of opera stars with "plenty of life and some style about them". Renée Fleming and Ruth Ann Swenson sang splendidly too. But Steane felt ambivalent about the album as a whole. It was obvious that the charity gala at which it had been recorded had been "warm-hearted". Those who had attended the concert would probably never forget it, and for them, the CD would be a treasurable memento. But the merciless scrutiny of the laser beam exposed flaws in the older singers' contributions that would not have been evident to someone sitting in Carnegie Hall and caught up in the spirit of the occasion. Listening to the album at home, one enjoyed the concert up to a point, but one's pleasure was "mainly [of] a theoretical kind" - "'You can tell they loved that', and so forth". "The disc may come down from the shelves from time to time."

== CD track listing ==
Benjamin Britten (1913-1976), with a text by Wystan Hugh Auden

- 1 (3:49) On this Island, Op. 11: "Let the florid music praise" (Renée Fleming, Warren Jones)

Franz Schubert (1797-1828), with a text by Johann Wolfgang von Goethe

- 2 (1:57) "Der Musensohn", D. 764 (Frederica von Stade, Martin Katz)

Sergei Rachmaninov (1873-1943)

- 3 (4:57) "Vocalise", Op. 34 No. 14 (Ruth Ann Swenson, Warren Jones)

Gustav Mahler (1860-1911), with a traditional text

- 4 (2:40) Lieder aus Des Knaben Wunderhorn: "Lob des hohen Verstands" (Marilyn Horne, Martin Katz)

Enrique Granados (1867-1916), with a text by Fernando Periquet y Zuaznabar

- 5 (7:17) Goyescas: "Quejas, ó la maja y el ruiseñor" (Montserrat Caballé, Manuel Burgueras)

Richard Strauss (1864-1949), with a text by Hermann von Grim

- 6 (1:35) "Zueignung", Op. 10 No. 1 (Helen Donath, Klaus Donath)

Johannes Brahms (1833-1897), with a text by Josef Wenzig

- 7 (4:31) "Vor ewiger Liebe", Op. 43 No. 1 (Marilyn Horne, Martin Katz)

Richard Strauss, with a text by Adolf Friedrich von Schack

- 8 (2:29) "Ständchen", Op. 17 No. 2 (Renée Fleming, Warren Jones)

Arnold Schoenberg (1874-1951), with a text by Emanuel Schikaneder

- 9 (3:38) Cabaret Songs: Arie aus dem Spiegel von Arkadien: "Seit ich so viele Weiber sah" (Frederica von Stade, Martin Katz)

Johann Strauss II (1825-1899), with a text by Italo Celeste (or Celesti)

- 10 (4:24) Frühlingsstimmen, Op. 410: "Comparvero le rondini" (Ruth Ann Swenson, Warren Jones)

Stephen Foster (1826-1864), with a text by George Cooper

- 11 (3:02) "If you've only got a moustache" (Marilyn Horne, Martin Katz)

Joaquín Turina (1882-1949), with a text by Ramón de Campoamor

- 12 (2:20) Cantares, Op. 19 No. 3: "Más cerca de mí te siento" (Montserrat Caballé, Manuel Burgueras)

Franz Lehár (1870-1948), with a libretto by Viktor Léon and Leo Stein

- 13 (5:07) Die lustige Witwe: "Es lebt eine Vilja" (Helen Donath, Klaus Donath)

John Kander (b. 1927), with a text by Sullivan Ballou

- 14 (7:32) "A letter from Sullivan Ballou" (Renée Fleming, Warren Jones)

Jean-Paul-Égide Martini (1741-1816), with a text by Jean-Pierre Claris de Florian

- 15 (4:40) "Plaisir d'amour" (Marilyn Horne, Martin Katz)

Franz Lehár, with a libretto by Ludwig Herzer and Fritz Löhner-Beda

- 16 (3:09) Das Land des Lächelns: "Dein ist mein ganzes Herz" (Olafur Bjarnason, Warren Jones)

Richard Rodgers (1902-1979), with a text parodying lyrics by Oscar Hammerstein II

- 17 (3:05) Oklahoma!: "Oh, what a beautiful mornin'" (Helen Donath, Klaus Donath)

Jerome Kern (1885-1945), with lyrics by Oscar Hammerstein II

- 18 (3:37) Show Boat: "Ol' man river" (Samuel Ramey, James Levine)

William Bolcom (b. 1938), with a text by Arnold Weinstein

- 19 (3:08) Cabaret Songs: "Amor" (Frederica von Stade, Martin Katz)

Aaron Copland (1900-1990), with a text by Robert Lowry

- 20 (3:19) Old American Songs, Set 2: "At the river" (Marilyn Horne, Martin Katz)

Patty Hill and Mildred J. Hill (attrib.), with a text by Preston Ware Orem and Mrs R. R. Forman (attrib.)

- 21 (1:24) "Happy birthday to you" (Olafur Bjarnason, Montserrat Caballé, Helen Donath, Renée Fleming, Samuel Ramey, Frederica von Stade, Ruth Ann Swenson, Martin Katz, Warren Jones)

== Personnel ==
=== Musical ===
- Montserrat Caballé, soprano
- Helen Donath, soprano
- Renée Fleming, soprano
- Ruth Ann Swenson, soprano
- Marilyn Horne, mezzo-soprano
- Frederica von Stade, mezzo-soprano
- Olafur Bjarnason, tenor
- Samuel Ramey, bass
- Manuel Burgueras, piano
- Klaus Donath, piano
- Warren Jones, piano
- Martin Katz, piano
- James Levine, piano

=== Other ===
- John Pfeiffer, producer
- Leszek Wojcik, balance engineer
- Marian Conaty, editing engineer

== Release history ==
In 1994, RCA Victor Red Seal released the album on CD (catalogue number 09026 62547 2), with a 40-page booklet including the texts of all the songs in their original languages, translations into English, French and German and notes in English, French and German by Jane Scovell, co-author of Horne's autobiography.
