= Doktor Faust =

Opera by Ferruccio Busoni

- Opera by Ferruccio Busoni
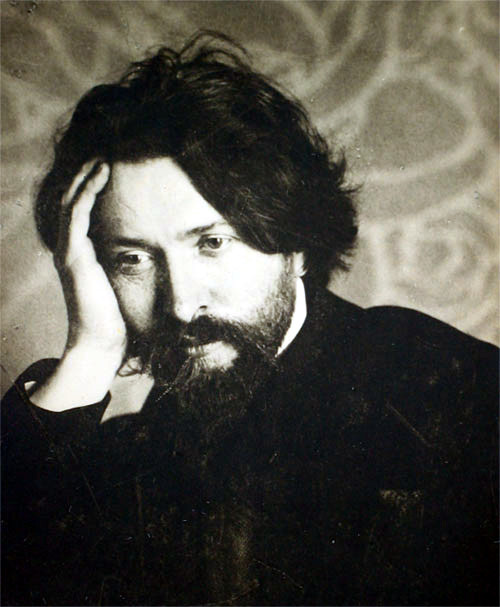
- Ferruccio Busoni in 1897
- Librettist: Ferruccio Busoni
- Language: German
- Based on: Faust
- Premiere: 21 May 1925; Sächsisches Staatstheater, Dresden

Doktor Faust is an opera by Ferruccio Busoni with a German libretto by the composer, based on the myth of Faust. Busoni worked on the opera, which he intended as his masterpiece, between 1916 and 1924, but it was still incomplete at the time of his death. His pupil Philipp Jarnach finished it. More recently, in 1982, Antony Beaumont completed the opera using sketches by Busoni that were previously thought to have been lost. Nancy Chamness published an analysis of the libretto to Doktor Faust and a comparison with Goethe's version.

== Performance history ==
Doktor Faust was given its world premiere at the Sächsisches Staatstheater, Dresden on 21 May 1925 using the version completed by Philipp Jarnach. The premiere was conducted by Fritz Busch, produced by Alfred Reucker, and designed by Karl Danneman. Over the next few years the opera was performed in many of the opera houses of Germany including those in Dortmund, Duisburg, Karlsruhe, Weimar, and Hanover in 1925; Hanover and Wiesbaden in 1926; and Stuttgart, Dortmund, Hanover, Cologne, Leipzig, Hamburg, and Frankfurt in 1927. The opera finally reached Berlin on 27 October 1927 with a performance at the Staatsoper am Platz der Republik. The work was performed again in Hanover and in Prague, the first performance outside of Germany, in June 1928.

Its first performance in England was on 17 March 1937 in a concert version presented at Queen's Hall, London, conducted by Sir Adrian Boult. The opera was sung in the English translation prepared by Edward J. Dent, produced by Edward Clark, and starred Dennis Noble as Faust and Parry Jones as Mephistopheles. A second concert version was presented at the Royal Festival Hall, London, on 13 November 1959, again conducted by Boult, with Dietrich Fischer-Dieskau in the title role and Richard Lewis as Mephistopheles. The UK stage premiere did not occur until 1986, when it was mounted in London at the English National Opera beginning on 25 April with conductors Mark Elder and Antony Beaumont. Thomas Allen sang Faust and Graham Clark, Mephistopheles. The performance was sung in Dent's translation and used the new ending by Antony Beaumont.

The opera received its Italian premiere at the Maggio Musicale Fiorentino on 28 May 1942 under the baton of Fernando Previtali and starring Enzo Mascherini as Faust, Renato Gigli as Mefistofele, and Augusta Oltrabella as the duchess. Previtali conducted another notable production of the opera at that house in 1964 with Renato Cesari as Faust, Herbert Handt as Mefistofele, and Luisa Maragliano as the duchess. La Scala staged the opera for the first time on 16 March 1960 under conductor Hermann Scherchen with Dino Dondi in the title role, Aldo Bertocci as Mefistofele, and Margherita Roberti as the duchess.

The first performance of Doktor Faust in France occurred at the Théâtre des Champs-Élysées on 19 June 1963. Shortly thereafter, the work had its United States premiere on 1 December 1964 in a concert format presented by the American Opera Society at Carnegie Hall. The production was conducted by Jascha Horenstein and starred Dietrich Fischer-Dieskau in the title role with George Shirley as Mephistopheles and Ingrid Bjoner as the Duchess of Parma. The first United States staged performance of the work was given on 25 January 1974 in Reno, Nevada, by the Nevada Opera Company conducted by Ted Puffer at the Pioneer Center for the Performing Arts. The opera was given in an English translation by Ted and Deena Puffer and starred Daniel Sullivan as Faust and Ted Rowland as Mephistopheles.

Although certainly not one of the most frequently performed operas, Doktor Faust has been produced a number of times over the last twenty-five years. Companies which have staged the work include: Opernhaus Graz, Austria, (1965), the Teatro Comunale di Bologna (1985), the Palais Garnier (1989), La Scala (1989), the New York City Opera (1992), the Salzburg Festival (presented by the Opéra National de Lyon, 1999), the Staatsoper Unter den Linden (2006), and the Berlin State Opera (2008) among others. The Metropolitan Opera mounted its first production of the work in 2001 with Thomas Hampson in the title role, Robert Brubaker as Mephistopheles, and Katarina Dalayman as the duchess. The San Francisco Opera performed the work for the first time in a co-production with the Staatsoper Stuttgart in 2004 with Rodney Gilfry in the title role, Chris Merritt as Mephistopheles, and Hope Briggs as the duchess. A 2006 performance of the opera at the Zurich Opera was filmed live and released on DVD. The production starred Thomas Hampson in the title role and was conducted by Philippe Jordan (see additional details here).

== Roles ==
Role	Voice type	Premiere Cast, 21 May 1925 (Conductor: Fritz Busch)
The Poet	spoken	Erich Ponto (Note: Erich Ponto appeared as a baritone in the premiere of Kurt Weill's The Threepenny Opera, and as an actor in films, including Die Feuerzangenbowle, Kleider machen Leute, No Greater Love, Sauerbruch – Das war mein Leben, and The Third Man.)
Doktor Faust	baritone	Robert Burg
Wagner, his famulus, later Rector magnificus	bass	Willy Bader
Mephistopheles, sixth voice, a man dressed in black, a monk, a herald, court chaplain, courier, night-watchman	tenor	Theo Strack
The Duke of Parma	tenor or baritone	Josef Correck
The Duchess of Parma	soprano	Meta Seinemeyer
Master of Ceremonies	bass	Adolf Schoepflin
The girl's brother, a soldier	tenor or baritone	Rudolf Schmalnauer (Note: Rudolf Schmalnauer also performed in the premiere of Die schweigsame Frau.)
A lieutenant	tenor	Ludwig Eybisch (Note: Ludwig Eybisch also performed in the premiere of Arabella.)
First student from Cracow	tenor	E. Meyerolbersleben
Second student from Cracow	tenor	Paul Schöffler
Third student from Cracow	bass	Wilhelm Moy
Theologian	baritone	Robert Büssel (Note: Robert Büssel also performed in the premieres of Arabella and Die toten Augen)
Law student	baritone	Wilhelm Moy
Natural scientist	baritone	Heinrich Hermanns
First student from Wittenberg	tenor	Heinrich Tessmer (Note: Heinrich Tessmer also performed in the recording of The Bartered Bride conducted by Thomas Beecham.)
Second student from Wittenberg	tenor	E. Meyerolbersleben
Third student from Wittenberg	tenor	Ludwig Eybisch
Fourth student from Wittenberg	baritone	Paul Schöffler
Gravis, (Note: Gravis and Levis are Latin antonyms meaning "heavy" and "light." Smith, pp. 484 and 633.) first spirit voice	bass	Heinrich Hermanns
Levis, second spirit voice	bass	Robert Büssel
Asmodus, third spirit voice	baritone	Paul Schöffler
Beelzebuth, fourth spirit voice	tenor	Heinrich Kuppinger
Megäros, (Note: Megäros, a son of Zeus and a Nymphe, escaped the flood in the time of Deukalion, by ascending Mount Gerania. - Pausanias, Guide to Greece 1.40.1, accessed on 5 February 2009.) fifth spirit voice	tenor	Ludwig Eybisch
Voices from on high	soprano soprano alto alto tenor tenor bass bass	Erna Berger; Irmgard Quitzow; Adelma von Tinty; Elfriede Haberkorn; Ludwig Eybisch; E. Meyerolbersleben; Paul Schöffler; Heinrich Hermanns
Chorus: churchgoers, spirit voices, soldiers, courtiers, Catholic and Lutheran students, huntsmen, peasants; Dancers: fencing pages

== Instrumentation ==
The orchestra consists of: 3 flutes, piccolo, 3 oboes, English horn, 3 clarinets (bass clarinet, 3 bassoons, contrabassoon; 5 French horns, 3 trumpets, 3 trombones, tuba; timpani, triangle, snare drum, field drum, 1 pair of crash cymbals, suspended cymbal, tam-tam, xylophone, bass drum, glockenspiel, celesta; organ; 2 harps, 16 1st violins, 16 2nd violins, 12 violas, 12 cellos, and 8 double basses.

Stage band: 2 French horns, 6 trumpets, 2 trombones; timpani, 2 snare drums, thunder machine, 3 heavy liturgical bells in C, F, and G; violin, viola, cello.

== Synopsis ==
The opera contains two prologues, an intermezzo, and three scenes.

=== Symphonia ===
Orchestral introduction: Easter Vespers and Augurs of Spring. The orchestra begins with bell imitations; later the chorus, behind the curtain, sings the single word: "Pax".

=== The poet speaks ===
In front of the curtain the poet speaks to the spectators explaining why he abandoned his earlier ideas of using Merlin and Don Juan as subject matter in favor of Faust. This spoken introduction emphasizes the play's origins in puppet theater. (This section is often omitted.)

=== Prologue 1 ===
Wittenberg, Germany, during the Middle Ages.

Faust is Rector Magnificus of the university. While he is working on an experiment in his laboratory, Wagner, his pupil, brings word of three students from Kraków, who have arrived unannounced to give Faust a book on black magic, Clavis Astartis Magica (The Key to the Magic of Astarte). Faust reflects on the power that will soon be his. The students come on stage, and tell him that this book is for him. When Faust asks what he must give in return, they say only "Later". He then asks whether he will see them again, and they respond "Perhaps." They then depart. Wagner reappears, and after questioning from Faust, tells his teacher that he saw no one enter or leave. Faust concludes that these visitors were supernatural.

=== Prologue 2 ===
Midnight that same evening.

Faust opens the book and follows its directions. He makes a circle on the floor, steps into it and calls upon Lucifer to appear. A pale light is seen around the room, and then unseen voices materialize. Faust then wishes, as his 'Will', for spirits at his beck and call. Five flames appear, servants of Lucifer, but Faust is not impressed at their claims of speed. The sixth flame/voice, Mephistopheles, claims that "I am as swift as the thoughts of man" ("als wie des Menschen Gedanke"). Faust then accepts Mephistopheles as a servant. He demands that all his wishes be granted, to have all knowledge and the power of genius. Mephistopheles, in return, says that Faust must serve him after death, which Faust recoils from at first. Mephistopheles reminds Faust that his creditors and enemies are at the door. With Faust's approval, Mephistopheles causes them to fall, dead. Then, with the chorus in the distance singing a 'Credo' on Easter morning, Faust signs the pact in blood, wondering what has become of his 'Will'. He faints upon realizing that he has forfeited his soul. Mephistopheles gleefully takes the contract in hand.

=== Intermezzo ===
By this point, Faust has seduced the maiden Gretchen. At a chapel, her brother, a soldier, prays to find and punish the violator of his sister's honour. Mephistopheles points out the soldier to Faust, who wants to kill him, but not with his own hands. Mephistopheles disguises himself as a monk and offers to hear the Soldier's confession. A military patrol, surreptitiously directed by Mephistopheles, enters and kills the Soldier, claiming that the soldier had murdered their captain. The soldier's death is then to weigh on Faust's conscience.

=== Hauptspiel [Principal Action] ===
==== Scene 1 ====
The Ducal Park of Parma, Italy

The wedding ceremony for the Duke and Duchess of Parma is in process. The Master of Ceremonies announces a guest, the famous magician Dr. Faust. Faust enters with his herald (Mephistopheles). The Duchess is immediately smitten with Faust; the Duke surmises that "Hell has sent him here." Faust alters the atmosphere to night to be able to perform his magic feats. The first, at the Duchess' request, is vision of King Solomon and Queen Balkis, who respectively resemble Faust and the Duchess. Second is Samson and Delilah. Third is John the Baptist with Salome. An Executioner (looking like the Duke) threatens the Baptist (resembling Faust), but the Duchess cries out that the Baptist must be saved. In an aside, Faust asks the Duchess to run off with him, but she is hesitant, if willing. The Duke declares the magic show concluded and announces supper. Mephistopheles warns Faust to flee, since the food is poisoned. The Duchess returns to tell Faust that she will accompany him. Mephistopheles, disguised as a court chaplain, returns with the Duke and advises him against chasing down Faust and the Duchess. Instead, he advises the Duke to marry the sister of the Duke of Ferrara, who is threatening war on the Duke of Parma.

==== Symphonic intermezzo ====
In modo d'una Sarabanda [In the style of a Sarabande]

==== Scene 2 ====
At a tavern in Wittenberg

Some students talk of Plato and metaphysics, with Faust present. After Faust has responded to a question by saying that "Nothing is proven, and nothing is provable", with a citation of Martin Luther, the Catholic and Protestant students break into quarrel. Once that has subsided, Faust recalls his affair with the Duchess. Mephistopheles, disguised as a courier, brings the news that she has died and sent a gift to Faust. This is a baby's corpse, and Mephistopheles tosses it at Faust's feet. Mephistopheles tells the students of Faust's seduction of the Duchess, and subsequent abandonment. Mephistopheles then changes the dead infant into a bundle of straw and sets fire to it, from which comes a vision of Helen of Troy. The students recoil, and Mephistopheles departs. Faust attempts to embrace the vision, but it eludes him. In her place instead, the three Kraków students materialize, to demand the return of the magic book. Faust tells them that he has destroyed it. The students then tell him that he will die at the stroke of midnight.

==== Scene 3 ====
A Wittenberg street, in the snow, outside the church.

Mephistopheles, in disguise as a Night Watchman, announces that it is eleven o'clock. Wagner, the successor to Faust as university Rector and now resident in Faust's former home, says good-night to a group of students. Faust enters, alone, and sees his old home. Voices from the church sing of judgment and salvation. Faust wants to try to redeem himself with one final good deed. He sees a beggar woman with a child, and realizes that she is the Duchess. She hands him the child, tells him that there is still time to complete his work before midnight, then vanishes. Faust then tries to enter the church, but the Soldier (from the Intermezzo) materializes to block his path. Faust tries to pray, but cannot remember the words. From the light of the Night Watchman's lamp, Faust sees the figure of the crucified Christ metamorphose into that of Helen of Troy. "Gibt es keine Gnade?" ["Is there no mercy?"], he sings. (At this point in the Beaumont version Faust sings "Euch zum Trotze ... die wir nennen böse.... An dieser hohen Einsicht meiner Reife bricht sich nun eure Bosheit und in der mir errungnen Freiheit erlischt Gott und Teufel zugleich." ["I defy you ... whom we call evil.... Your malice breaks on the superior insight of my maturity, and in the freedom gained by me, God and the Devil together cease to exist."]) In parallel with Prologue I, Faust forms a circle on the ground. He then steps into it with the child's body and, with one last supreme effort, he transfers his life-force to the child. The Night Watchman calls out the midnight hour; Faust falls dead; a naked youth arises with a blossoming branch in his right hand and steps forth into the night. The Night Watchman, now revealed as Mephistopheles, sees Faust's body on the ground, and asks "Sollte dieser Mann verunglückt sein?" ["Has this man met with some misfortune?"]. In the Beaumont ending Mephistopheles throws Faust's body onto his shoulders and walks off; distant voices repeat Faust's final words: "Blut meines Blutes, Glied meines Gliedes, dir vermach' ich mein Leben, ich, Faust, ich, Faust, ein ewiger Wille." ["Blood of my blood, limb of my limb, I bequeath to thee my life, I, Faust, I, Faust, one eternal will."]

=== Epilogue ===
The poet speaks to the spectators. This section is often omitted.

== Recordings ==
Audio recordings

- 1959: Dietrich Fischer-Dieskau (Faust), Richard Lewis (Mephistopheles), Heather Harper (Duchess of Parma), John Cameron (Duke of Parma), Ian Wallace (Wagner); London Philharmonic Orchestra, Royal Academy of Music Chorus; Sir Adrian Boult, conductor (Jarnach version with about 20 minutes of music omitted; complete radio broadcast, 205 minutes [includes 1954 Glyndebourne Arlecchino]: Immortal Performances IPCD 1017–3; abridged recording of the radio broadcast, 74 minutes: LPO 0056).
- 1969: Dietrich Fischer-Dieskau (Faust), William Cochran (Mephistopheles), Hildegard Hillebrecht (Duchess of Parma), Anton de Ridder (Duke of Parma), Karl-Christian Kohn (Wagner); Bavarian Radio Symphony Orchestra and Chorus; Ferdinand Leitner, conductor (Deutsche Grammophon; Jarnach version, a studio performance for radio broadcast by Bavarian Radio with European Union funding, from first edition liner notes, with cuts to the score; see additional details here).
- 1998: Dietrich Henschel (Faust), Kim Begley (Mephistopheles), Torsten Kerl (Duke of Parma)), Eva Jenisova (Duchess of Parma), Markus Hollop (Wagner/The Master of Ceremonies), Detlef Roth (The girl's brother), Dietrich Fischer-Dieskau (speaker); Orchestre et Choeur de l'Opéra National de Lyon; Kent Nagano, conductor (Erato; Beaumont edition, with choice of Jarnach or Beaumont final scene via CD player programming; (Grammy Award for Best Opera Recording of 2001); see additional details here).

Video recording

- 2006: Thomas Hampson (Faust), Gregory Kunde (Mephistopheles), Sandra Tratmigg (Duchess of Parma); Zurich Opera House Chorus and Orchestra; Philippe Jordan, conductor (Arthaus Musik DVD and Blu-ray Disc; Jarnach version, taken from live performances, with cuts to the score; see additional details here).
