= Helen Donath =

American opera singer (born 1940)

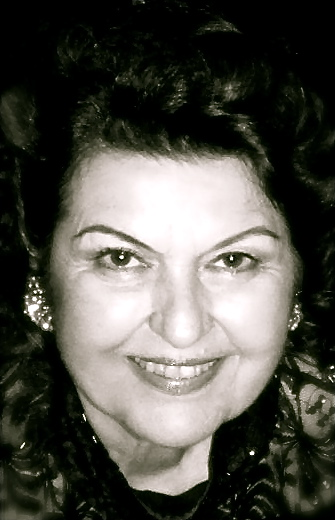
- Born: Helen Jeanette Erwin; July 10, 1940 (age 86); Corpus Christi, Texas, U.S.
- Occupation: Soprano singer
- Years active: 1958–present
- Spouse: Klaus Donath

Helen Jeanette Donath (née Erwin; born July 10, 1940) is an American soprano with a career spanning fifty years.

== Biography ==
Helen Erwin was born in Corpus Christi, Texas and studied there at Del Mar College. Later she studied in New York with Paola Novikova. She debuted as a concert and Lieder singer in New York in 1958. In 1961, she became a member of the Opernstudio at the Cologne Opera. She sang from 1963 until 1968 at the Staatsoper Hannover where she met her future husband, choir master and conductor Klaus Donath. Their son, Alexander Donath, is a stage and opera director. In 2000, all three were involved in Michigan Opera Theatre's production of Der Rosenkavalier where Donath sang the Marschallin.

In 1967, she sang Pamina in Mozart's The Magic Flute at the Salzburg Festival, which began a long association with the festival. From 1970 until 1990, she was a regular member of the Vienna State Opera. She has performed all over the world including at the Vienna State Opera, Metropolitan Opera, Salzburg Festival, Covent Garden, La Scala, Barcelona, Paris, Florence, Tokyo, Berlin, Munich. In 2006, she had performances as Despina in Così fan tutte at the Vienna State Opera, Salzburg Festival and other places.

Donath performed works of Bach, Mozart, Haydn, Schumann, Wagner, Richard Strauss, and has worked and recorded under Herbert von Karajan, Karl Richter, Wolfgang Sawallisch, Rafael Kubelík, Antal Doráti, Leonard Bernstein, Georg Solti, Giuseppe Patanè, Daniel Barenboim, Nikolaus Harnoncourt, Neville Marriner, Helmuth Rilling, Colin Davis, Eugen Jochum, Riccardo Muti, Zubin Mehta, Eliahu Inbal, and James Judd. She was awarded in 2005 the Verdienstkreuz I. Klasse des Niedersächsischen Verdienstordens (Cross of Merit 1st Class of Lower Saxony), in 1990 the Niedersachsenpreis and made Kammersängerin of Bavaria. She is Doctor honoris causa of the University of Miami.

== Recordings ==
Donath has made many opera and operetta recordings with various companies. Her finest moments on disc include her Eva in Wagner's Die Meistersinger von Nürnberg and Sophie in Strauss's Der Rosenkavalier.

- Beethoven: Fidelio (as Marzelline), with Helga Dernesch, Jon Vickers, Zoltán Kelemen, Karl Ridderbusch, José van Dam, Chorus of the Deutsche Oper, Berlin and Berliner Philharmoniker, (con.) Herbert von Karajan (EMI)
- Gluck: Orfeo ed Euridice (as Amor), with Marilyn Horne, Pilar Lorengar, and Royal Opera House Orchestra, (con.) Sir Georg Solti (Decca)
- Puccini: Gianni Schicchi (as Lauretta), with Rolando Panerai, Vera Baniewicz, Peter Seiffert, Munich Radio Symphony Orchestra, and Bavarian Radio Chorus, (con.) Giuseppe Patanè (RCA)
- Lehár: The Land of Smiles (as Lisa), with Martin Finke, Klaus Hirte, Siegfried Jerusalem, Brigitte Lindner, Chor des Bayerischen Rundfunks, and Münchner Rundfunkorchester, (con.) Willi Boskovsky (EMI)
- Strauss, R: Arabella (as Zdenka), with Júlia Várady, Dietrich Fischer-Dieskau, Walter Berry, Helga Schmidt, Elfriede Hobarth, Adolf Dallapozza, and Bavarian State Orchestra and Opera Chorus, (con.) Wolfgang Sawallisch (Orfeo)
- Strauss, R: Der Rosenkavalier (as Sophie), with Régine Crespin, Yvonne Minton, Manfred Jungwirth, Vienna Philharmonic Orchestra, and Sir Georg Solti (Decca)
- Verdi: Un ballo in maschera (as Oscar), with Luciano Pavarotti, Sherrill Milnes, Renata Tebaldi, Regina Resnik, and Orchestra dell'Accademia Nazionale di Santa Cecilia, (con.) Bruno Bartoletti (Decca)
- Mozart: The Magic Flute (as Pamina), with Günther Leib, Peter Schreier, Leipzig Radio Chorus Orchestra, Staatskapelle Dresden Orchestra (RCA)
- Monteverdi: L'incoronazione di Poppea (as Poppea), with Elisabeth Söderström, Cathy Berberian, Paul Esswood, and Concentus Musicus Wien, (con.) Nikolaus Harnoncourt (Teldec)
- Wagner: Die Meistersinger von Nürnberg (as Eva), with René Kollo, Theo Adam, Peter Schreier, Geraint Evans, Karl Ridderbusch, Chor der Staatsoper Dresden, Chor des Leipziger Rundfunks and Staatskapelle Dresden, (con.) Herbert von Karajan (EMI)
- Haydn: L'anima del filosofo, with Robert Swensen, Sylvia Greenberg, Thomas Quasthoff, Paul Hansen, Azuko Suzuki, Bavarian Radio Chorus and Munich Radio Orchestra, (con.) Leopold Hager (Orfeo)
- Humperdinck: Hänsel und Gretel, with Anna Moffo, Christa Ludwig, Dietrich Fischer-Dieskau, Charlotte Berthold, Arleen Auger, Lucia Popp, the Münchner Rundfunkorchester, Tölzer Knabenchor, and Kurt Eichhorn as conductor. RCA 1999
- Hindemith Sancta Susanna, as Susanna with Gabriele Schnaut (Klementia) and Gabriele Schreckenbach (Alte Nonne), Janis Martin, Damen des RIAS Kammerchors, Radio-Symphonie-Orchester Berlin, Gerd Albrecht, conductor

Other recordings

- Bach: Christmas Oratorio / Schreier
- Bach: Cantatas BWV 41 / Rilling
- Bach: Cantatas BWV 119–121 / Rilling
- Bach: Easter Cantatas / Rilling
- Bach: Magnificat / Gönnenwein
- Bach: St Matthew Passion / K. Richter (DVD)
- Bach: St John Passion / K. Richter (DVD)
- Beethoven: Fidelio / Leonard Bernstein
- Beethoven: Missa solemnis / Kubelik
- Beethoven: Symphony No. 9 / Celibidache
- Beethoven: Symphony No 9 / Kubelik
- Blendinger: Media in Vita, Sawallisch, with Hermann Becht, Bayerisches Staatsorchester
- Bizet: Carmen / Lorin Maazel
- Debussy: Pelléas et Mélisande / Kubelik
- Flotow: Alessandro Stradella/ Wallberg, Schartner
- Gluck: Orfeo ed Euridice / Solti
- Handel: Messiah / K. Richter
- Haydn: La vera costanza / Doráti
- Haydn: The Creation, The Seasons / Koch
- Humperdinck: Königskinder / Wallberg
- Lehár: The Merry Widow (as Valencienne), with Bavarian Radio Chorus and Munich Radio Orchestra, Heinz Wallberg conducting (EMI)
- Mahler: Symphony No. 4 / Inbal
- Mozart: Così fan tutte / Honeck (DVD)
- Mozart: Great Mass in C minor, Mass in C major, Requiem / C. Davis
- Mozart: The Magic Flute / Suitner
- Mozart: Don Giovanni / Barenboim
- Mozart: La finta semplice / Hager
- Mozart: The Marriage of Figaro / C. Davis
- Mozart: Lucio Silla / Hager
- Mozart: Unknown Arias for Soprano / Donath
- Nicolai: The Merry Wives of Windsor / Klee
- Pfitzner: Das Christ-Elflein / Eichhorn
- Pfitzner: Palestrina / Kubelik
- Schubert: Sacred Works / Sawallisch
- Schubert: "The Shepherd on the Rock" / Donath
- Schubert: Masses, etc. / Sawallisch
- Schubert: Cantata Lazarus with Wolfgang Sawallisch, Bavarian Radio Orchestra
- Schumann: Requiem, etc. / Klee,
- Schumann: Der Rose Pilgerfahrt, Op. 112, Sawallisch
- Wagner: Der Ring des Nibelungen / Karajan, Berlin
- Weber: Der Freischütz / Sawallisch

== See also ==
- Marilyn Horne: Divas in Song
