= Die toten Augen =

Opera by Eugen d'Albert

- Opera by Eugen d'Albert
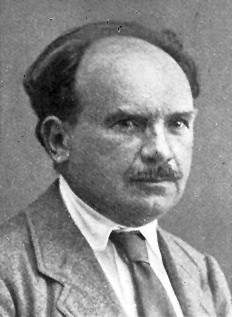
- Eugen d'Albert in 1904
- Translation: The Dead Eyes
- Librettist: Hanns Heinz Ewers; Marc Henry
- Language: German
- Based on: Les yeux morts by Marc Henry
- Premiere: 16 March 1916; Court Opera, Dresden

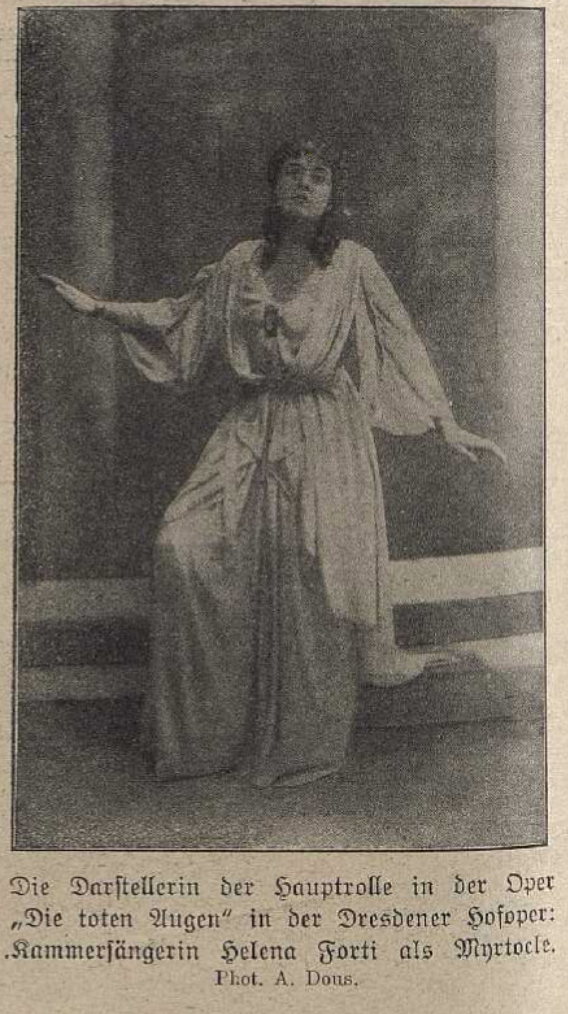
Helena Forti as Myrtocle in Die toten Augen

Die toten Augen (The Dead Eyes) is an opera (called a Bühnendichtung or 'stage poem' by the composer) with a prologue and one act by Eugen d'Albert to a libretto in German by Hanns Heinz Ewers and Marc Henry (Achille Georges d'Ailly-Vaucheret) after Henry's own 1897 play Les yeux morts.

== Performance history ==
Die toten Augen was first performed on 5 March 1916 at the Hofoper in Dresden conducted by Fritz Reiner. During the opening run of seven performances (March–May 1916), the role of Aurelius Galba was sung on two occasions, and that of Der Hirt on four occasions, by Richard Tauber.

== Roles ==
Roles, voice types, premiere cast
| Role | Voice type | Premiere cast, 5 March 1916 Conductor: Fritz Reiner |
|---|---|---|
| Arcesius, Roman envoy to Jerusalem | baritone | Friedrich Plaschke |
| Myrtocle, his blind wife | soprano | Helena Forti |
| Aurelius Galba, a Roman captain | tenor | Curt Taucher |
| Arsinoe, Myrtocle's slave | mezzo-soprano | Grete Merrem-Nikisch |
| Ktesiphar, an Egyptian doctor | tenor | Robert Büssel |
| Jesus (Worte Christi) | tenor (off-stage) | |
| Mary Magdalen | contralto | Anka Horvat |
| Shepherd (der Hirt) | tenor | |
| Shepherd boy | soprano | |
| Reaper | baritone | |
| Rebecca, a Jewish woman | soprano | |
| Ruth, a Jewish woman | soprano | |
| Esther, a Jewish woman | soprano | |
| Sarah, a Jewish woman | soprano | |
| A sick woman | soprano | |
Arcesius' male and female slaves, reapers etc.

== Synopsis ==
Set in biblical times, Die toten Augen is a tragic drama involving a Roman envoy called Arcesius, his beautiful but blind wife Myrtocle and Aurelius Galba, a handsome Roman captain.

A review by Michael Oliver in Gramophone enlarges upon this:

The plot, set in Jerusalem on the first Palm Sunday, concerns the beautiful Myrtocle, blind since birth, who longs for sight mainly so that she may see her deeply loved husband Arcesius, whom she believes to be as handsome as Apollo. She is given her sight by Christ who (his single, off-stage line) predicts that before the sun sets she will curse him. A man as handsome as Apollo indeed appears, and Myrtocle falls into his arms: it is Galba, her husband's friend, who has loved her for years. Arcesius kills him and Myrtocle, realising his love and his suffering, blinds herself again by staring at the sun. The action is framed by a Prologue and Epilogue in which a Shepherd goes in search of a lost lamb and, in the Epilogue, finds it.

== Recordings ==
- 1997: Dagmar Schellenberger, Norbert Orth, Hartmut Welker, Olaf Bär; Dresden Philharmonic, Dresden Philharmonic Choir, conductor: Ralf Weikert; March 1997, CPO - B000042OED (CD)

There is another recording, deriving from a 1951 Stuttgart radio production, on Cantus Classics CACD 5.00231 F. It is conducted by Walter Born, and the main singers are Marianne Schech, Wolfgang Windgassen, Franz Fehringer and Hetty Plümacher.
