= Carlos Kleiber discography =

Conductor discography

- Studio recordings: 9
- Live audio recordings: 75
- Live video recordings: 18
- Compilations: 2
- Posthumous documentaries: 2

The Austrian conductor Carlos Kleiber (1930–2004) only released nine studio recordings over the course of his five-decade career. He was famous for his elusiveness, often canceling concerts on short notice and appearing in only 96 orchestral concerts as well as about 620 opera performances. Equally as hesitant with recordings, Kleiber stated that "every unproduced record is a good record", and was described as not being able to "bear the thought of listeners sitting at home with a score in their hands… identifying every mistake". His nine studio recordings are of four operas and five symphonies published by Deutsche Grammophon, as well as a single piano concerto with EMI. Each became critically acclaimed in its own right, with those of Beethoven's 5th and 7th symphonies hailed as among the most outstanding classical music recordings ever made. Following his abandonment of the studio in 1982, Kleiber is represented by 75 live audio and 18 live video recordings, many of which are bootlegs; those of Der Rosenkavalier and the Vienna New Year's Concerts have been especially admired. Kleiber's contributions in the studio and stage have secured his place as one of the most important 20th century conductors.

Kleiber's first two studio recordings were abandoned before completion: a 1975 recording of Beethoven's Piano Concerto No. 5 with Arturo Benedetti Michelangeli and a 1979 recording of Puccini's La bohème at La Scala. His first success came in 1973 when he recorded von Weber's Der Freischütz with Staatskapelle Dresden, followed by recordings with the Vienna Philharmonic (VPO) of Beethoven's Symphony No. 5 in 1975 and No. 7 in 1976. Both symphonies received much praise, with one reviewer commenting on the former that "it was as if Homer had come back to recite the Iliad". Around the mid-1970s Kleiber became closely associated with the Bavarian State Orchestra (BSO), and although they did not complete a recording of Berg's Wozzeck and Dvořák's Symphony No. 9, they released acclaimed recordings of Johann Strauss's Die Fledermaus in 1976 and Verdi's La traviata in 1977. Also in 1977, he released a recording of Dvořák's Piano Concerto with the BSO and the pianist Sviatoslav Richter, making this his first and only studio recording with a soloist. Kleiber returned to the VPO in late 1978, and released recordings of Schubert's Symphony Nos. 3 and 8 the following year. He began recording both Brahms's Symphony No. 4 with the VPO and Wagner's Tristan und Isolde with Staatskapelle Dresden in 1980. While the former would be released in 1981, the latter would continue recording until April 1982 when Kleiber walked out for unknown reasons. However, enough had been recorded to allow its release later that year; it was highly praised, particularly for the surprising but successful pick of the young Welsh soprano Margaret Price as Isolde.

His earliest surviving recording is a 1960 live performance with the NDR Symphony Orchestra of the Suite in B flat major by Georg Philipp Telemann and the Cello Concerto in B flat major by Carl Philipp Emanuel Bach. As a whole, his recordings represent a limited repertoire, with many featuring the same pieces. Among these are nine recordings of both Beethoven's 4th and 7th symphonies and Der Rosenkavalier; eight recordings of Tristan und Isolde; six recordings of La bohème; and five recordings of the overture from Der Freischütz. Deutsche Grammophon released two collections in 2010 and 2014 of Kleiber's recordings under their label. Two posthumous documentaries on Kleiber were also released in 2010 and 2011.

== Discography ==
Private live recording Video not commercially available

Discography
Date	Composer: Work(s)	Orchestra (chorus: chorus master)	Soloist(s)	Release(s) (Note: For studio recordings, the first LP and CD releases are listed, for the live recordings the earliest release is listed. (Note: When the earliest release is not the official release, this is noted and the official is substituted.))	
Date	Composer: Work(s)	Orchestra (chorus: chorus master)	Soloist(s)	Year	Label Cat (Medium)
=== Studio recordings ===
22 January – 6 February 1973	Weber: Der Freischütz	Staatskapelle Dresden (MDR: Horst Neumann)	Janowitz (Note: Bernd Weikl (Ottokar); Siegfried Vogel (Cuno); Gundula Janowitz (Agathe); Edith Mathis (Ännchen); Theo Adam (Kaspar); Peter Schreier (Max); Franz Crass (Ein Eremit); Günther Leib (Kilian); Renate Hoff, Brigitte Pfretzchner, Renate Krahmer & Ingeborg Springer (Four bridesmaids))	1973	DGG 2720 071 (2 LPs)
22 January – 6 February 1973	Weber: Der Freischütz	Staatskapelle Dresden (MDR: Horst Neumann)	Janowitz	1986	DGG 415 432-2 (2 CDs)
29, 30 March, 4 April 1974	Beethoven: Symphony No. 5	Vienna Philharmonic Orchestra	–	1975	DGG 2530 516 (1 LP)
29, 30 March, 4 April 1974	Beethoven: Symphony No. 5	Vienna Philharmonic Orchestra	–	1984	DGG 415 861-2 (1 CD)
26–29 November 1975, 16 January 1976	Beethoven: Symphony No. 7	Vienna Philharmonic Orchestra	–	1976	DGG 2530 706 (1 LP)
26–29 November 1975, 16 January 1976	Beethoven: Symphony No. 7	Vienna Philharmonic Orchestra	–	1984	DGG 415 862-2 (1 CD)
9–14, 28 October 1975	Strauss II: Die Fledermaus	Bavarian State Orchestra (& chorus: Wolfgang Baumgart)	Prey (Note: Hermann Prey (Gabriel von Eisenstein); Julia Varady (Rosalinde); Benno Kusche (Frank); Iwan Rebroff (Prince Orlofsky); René Kollo (Alfred); Bernd Weikl (Max); Ferry Gruber (Dr Blind); Wolfgang Brendel (Dr Falke); Lucia Popp (Adele); Evi List (Ida); Franz Muxender (Frosch); Nikolai Lugowoi (Ivan))	1976	DGG 2707 088 (2 LPs)
9–14, 28 October 1975	Strauss II: Die Fledermaus	Bavarian State Orchestra (& chorus: Wolfgang Baumgart)	Prey	1986	DGG 415 646-2 (2 CDs)
14–21 May 1976, 26 January, 25-26 June 1977	Verdi: La traviata	Bavarian State Orchestra (& chorus: Wolfgang Baumgart)	Cotrubaș (Note: Ileana Cotrubas (Violetta Valéry); Plácido Domingo (Alfredo Germont); Sherrill Milnes (Giorgio Germont); Stefania Malagú (Flora Bervoix); Helena Jungwirth (Annina); Walter Gullino (Gastone de Letorières); Bruno Grella (Barone Douphol); Alfredo Giacomotti (Marchese d'Obigny); Giovanni Foianai (Dottore Grenvil); Walter Gullino (Giuseppe); Paul Friess (Flora's servant); Paul Winter (Commissioner))	1977	DGG 2707 103 (2 LPs)
14–21 May 1976, 26 January, 25-26 June 1977	Verdi: La traviata	Bavarian State Orchestra (& chorus: Wolfgang Baumgart)	Cotrubaș	1985	DGG 415 132-2 (1 CD)
18–21 June 1976	Dvořák: Piano Concerto	Bavarian State Orchestra	Richter	1977	EMI 5 66947 2 (1 LP)
18–21 June 1976	Dvořák: Piano Concerto	Bavarian State Orchestra	Richter	1987	EMI CDC 7 47967 2 (1 CD)
11–15 September 1978	Schubert: Symphony Nos. 3 & 8	Vienna Philharmonic Orchestra	–	1979	DGG 2531 124 (1 LP)
11–15 September 1978	Schubert: Symphony Nos. 3 & 8	Vienna Philharmonic Orchestra	–	1984	DGG 415 601-2 (1 CD)
12, 15 March, 1980	Brahms: Symphony No. 4	Vienna Philharmonic Orchestra	–	1981	DGG 2532 003 (1 LP)
12, 15 March, 1980	Brahms: Symphony No. 4	Vienna Philharmonic Orchestra	–	1998	DGG 457 706-2 (1 CD)
August 1980 – April 1982	Wagner: Tristan und Isolde	Staatskapelle Dresden (MDR: Gernhard Richter)	Kollo & Price (Note: René Kollo (Tristan); Margaret Price (Isolde ); Kurt Moll (King Marke); Dietrich Fischer-Dieskau (Kurwenal); Werner Götz (Melot); Brigitte Fassbaender (Brangäne); Anton Dermota (Shepherd); Wolfgang Hellmich (Helmsman); Eberhard Büchner (Sailor))	1982	DGG 2741 006 (5 LPs)
August 1980 – April 1982	Wagner: Tristan und Isolde	Staatskapelle Dresden (MDR: Gernhard Richter)	Kollo & Price	1986	DGG 413 315-2 (4 CDs)
=== Live audio recordings ===
7 December 1960	Telemann: Suite in B flat major	NDR Symphony Orchestra	–	2011 (Note: The We love Carlos Society (WLC 1-709) released a private recording of the Telemann in 1999 and the Cult of Classical Music (COCOM1014) in 2001 but Profil is the official release.)	Profil PH11031
7 December 1960	C.P.E. Bach: Cello Concerto in B flat major	NDR Symphony Orchestra	Güdel	2011	Profil PH11031
1 December 1962	Offenbach: "Die kleine Zauberflöte" (Le fifre enchanté, ou Le soldat magicien)	Deutsche Oper am Rhein Orchestra	Diekmann (Note: Karl Diekmann (Monsieur); Gabrielle Treskow (Madame); Eva Kasper (Das Zimmermädchen der Robin); Alfons Holte (Soldat))	2013	Profil PH12066
1 December 1962	Offenbach: "Die Verlobung bei der Laterne" (Le mariage aux lanternes)	Deutsche Oper am Rhein Orchestra	Wien (Note: Erika Wien (Catharine); Eva Kasper (Denise); Ditha Sommer (Fanchette); Alfons Holte (Pierre))	2013	Profil PH12066
1 December 1962	Offenbach: "Die Insel Tulipatan" (L'île de Tulipatan)	Deutsche Oper am Rhein Orchestra	Ollendorff (Note: Sonders Schier (Cacatois XXII); Eva Kasper (Alexis); Fritz Ollendorff (Romboïdal); Anni Körner (Theodorine); Alfons Holte (Hermoso))	2013	Profil PH12066
5 March 1964	Verdi: I due Foscari	Deutsche Oper am Rhein Orchestra (& chorus)	Polakoff (Note: Abe Polakoff (Francesco Foscari); Eugene Talley-Schmidt (Jacopo Foscari); Anna Green (Lucrezia Contarini); Neagu (Jacopo Loredano); Wegmann (Barbarigo); Borisch (Pisana))	2014	Classical Video Rarities (Note: No catalogue number exists for this release.)
4 March 1965	Verdi: Falstaff	Zurich Opera Orchestra (& chorus)	Mittelmann (Note: Norman Mittelmann (Sir John Falstaff); William Justus (Ford); Gerry de Groot (Alice Ford); Lucille Kailer (Nannetta); Ellen Kunz (Meg Page); Erika Wien (Mistress Quickly); Ernst-August Steinhoff (Fenton); Paul Späni (Dr Caius); Richard van Vrooman (Bardolfo); Heiz Borst (Pistola))	2009	Classical Video Rarities
7 June 1967	Mahler: Das Lied von der Erde	Vienna Symphony Orchestra	Ludwig & Kmentt	2014 (Note: Many earlier recordings exist, with Nuova Era (2224) in 1988 as the first; The 2014 Wiener Symphoniker edition (007) is the official release.)	Wiener Symphoniker 007
7 June 1967	Mozart: Symphony No. 33	Vienna Symphony Orchestra	–	1989	Nuova Era 2296
29 November 1969	Weber: Der Freischütz (Overture)	Stuttgart Radio Symphony Orchestra	–	? (Note: Year of release unknown)	SDR TST-77 331-2
27 January 1970	Weber: Der Freischütz (Overture)	Stuttgart Radio Symphony Orchestra	–	1996	Toshiba-EMI TOLW-3751/4; Released as an LD in 1996
27 January 1970	Strauss II: Die Fledermaus (Overture)	Stuttgart Radio Symphony Orchestra	–	1993	Capanella 001; Released as an LD in 1996
22 April 1970	Weber: Der Freischütz (Overture)	Stuttgart Radio Symphony Orchestra	–	1996	Toshiba EMI TOLW-3751/4
27 November 1970	Berg: Wozzeck	Bavarian State Orchestra (& chorus)	Adam (Note: Theo Adam (Wozzeck); Wendy Fine (Marie); Narika Krauth (Marie's son); Georg Paskuda (Captain); Jieth Engender (Doctor); Fritz Uhl (The Drum Major); Friedrich Lenz (Andres); Gudrun Wewezow (Margret); Max Proebstl (First Apprentice); Carl Hoppe (Second Apprentice); Walter Carnuth (Madman); Unknown (A Soldier))	2007	Opera Depot 10250-2
24 January 1971	Verdi: Otello	Staatsorchester Stuttgart (& chorus)	Windgassen (Note: Wolfgang Windgassen (Otello); Elisabeth Löw-Szöky (Desdemona); Camillo Megbor (Iago); Ursula Sutter (Emilia); James Harper (Cassio); Toni Krämer (Roderigo); Stefan Kosso (Lodovico); Klaus Bertram (Montano); Unknown (A herald))	2012	Premiere Opera CD 8196-2
17 June 1971	R. Strauss: Elektra	Staatsorchester Stuttgart (& chorus)	Steger (Note: Ingrid Steger (Elektra); Marion Lippert (Chrysothemis); Martha Mödl (Klytaemnestra); Unknown (Her confidante); Unknown (Her trainbearer); Unknown (A young servant); Unknown (An old servant); William Wildermann (Orest); Unknown (Orest's tutor); Wolfgang Windgassen (Aegisth); Unknown (An overseer); Unknown (First maid); Unknown (Second maid); Unknown (Third maid); Unknown (Fourth maid); Unknown (Fifth maid))	1999	Golden Melodram 6.0011
20 April 1972	R. Strauss: Der Rosenkavalier (Scenes from Act II & III)	Bavarian State Orchestra (& chorus)	Jones (Note: Gwyneth Jones (Note: Orfeo incorrectly listed The Marschallin as Claire Watson.) (The Marschallin); Brigitte Fassbaender (Octavian); Karl Ridderbusch (Baron Ochs auf Lerchenau); Lucia Popp (Sophie von Faninal); Benno Kusche (Herr von Faninal); Anneliese Waas (Marianne); David Thaw (Valzacchi); Margarethe Bence (Annina); Hans Wilbrink (A notary); Gerhard Unger (An Italian singer); Unknown (Three noble orphans); Unknown (A milliner); Unknown (A vendor of pets); Unknown (Faninal's Major-Domo); Albrecht Peter (A police inspector); Unknown (The Marschallin's Major-Domo); Lorenz Fehenberger (An innkeeper); Unknown (Four lackeys); Unknown (Flutist); Unknown (Noble Widow); Unknown (Hairdresser); Unknown (Leupold))	2003	Orfeo C 580 031 B
27 May 1972	Haydn: Symphony No. 94	WDR Symphony Orchestra Cologne	–	1992	Meteor MCD-001
27 May 1972	Berg: Wozzeck (excerpts)	WDR Symphony Orchestra Cologne	Fine	1993	Artists FED 045.46
27 May 1972	Beethoven: Symphony No. 7	WDR Symphony Orchestra Cologne	–	1993	Artists FED 018
24 July 1972	Wagner: Tristan und Isolde ("Prelude" & "Liebestod") (Note: The orchestral arrangement by Wagner himself)	Stuttgart Radio Symphony Orchestra	–	2006	Golden Melodram 4.0081
12 December 1972	Borodin: Symphony No. 2	Stuttgart Radio Symphony Orchestra	–	1996 (Note: Many earlier recordings exist, with Nuova Era (HR4410) in 1991 as the first; The 1996 Mediaphon edition (75.103) is the first official release, with the 2004 Hänssler edition (93.116) as the second.)	Mediaphon 75.103
22 April 1973	Wagner: Tristan und Isolde	Staatsorchester Stuttgart (& chorus)	Windgassen & Ligendza (Note: Wolfgang Windgassen (Tristan); Catarina Ligendza (Isolde); Gottlob Frick (King Marke); Gustav Neidlinger (Kurwenal); Gustav Grefe (Melot); Grace Hoffman (Brangäne); Alfred Pfeilfle (Shepherd); Kurt-Egon Opp (Helmsman); Toni Krämer (Sailor))	2003	Living Stage LS-1052
13 July 1973	R. Strauss: Der Rosenkavalier	Bavarian State Orchestra (& chorus)	Watson (Note: Claire Watson (The Marschallin); Brigitte Fassbaender (Octavian); Karl Ridderbusch (Baron Ochs auf Lerchenau); Lucia Popp (Sophie von Faninal); Benno Kusche (Herr von Faninal); Annelie Waas (Marianne); David Thaw (Valzacchi); Margarethe Bence (Annina); Hans Wilbrink (A notary); Gerhard Unger (An Italian singer); Evi List, Doris Linswe, Daphne Evangelatos (Three noble orphans); Isoldé Elchlepp (A milliner); Wolfgang Pirke (A vendor of pets); Franz Klarwein (Faninal's Major-Domo); Albrecht Peter (A police inspector); Georg Paskuda (The Marschallin's Major-Domo); Lorenz Fehenberger (An innkeeper); Rudolf Schwab, Walter Brem, Werner Liebl, Artur Horn (Four lackeys); Reinhard Schmidt (Flutist); Elizabeth von Ihering (Noble Widow); Karl Schrader (Hairdresser); Hans Mursch (Leupold))	1992	Exclusive EX92T49/51
7 October 1973	Wagner: Tristan und Isolde	Vienna Philharmonic (& chorus: Norbert Balatsch)	Hopf & Ligendza (Note: Hans Hopf (Tristan); Catarina Ligendza (Isolde ); Hans Sotin (King Marke); Gustav Neidlinger (Kurwenal); Hans Helm (Melot); Ruža Pospiš-Baldani (Brangäne); Horst Nitsche (Shepherd); Georg Tichy (Helmsman); Anton Dermota (Sailor))	1992	Exclusive EX93T18/20
15 June 1974	R. Strauss: Der Rosenkavalier	Royal Opera House orchestra (& chorus)	Dernesch (Note: Helga Dernesch (The Marschallin); Yvonne Minton (Octavian); Jules Bastin (Baron Ochs auf Lerchenau); Teresa Cahill (Sophie von Faninal); Derek Hammond-Stroud (Herr von Faninal); Gwyneth Price (Marianne); John Dobson (Valzacchi); Gillian Knight (Annina); Paul Hudson (A notary); Ermanno Mauro (An Italian singer); Unknown (Three noble orphans); Unknown (A milliner); Unknown (A vendor of pets); Edward Byles (Faninal's Major-Domo); Eric Garrett (A police inspector); Malcohn Campbell (The Marschallin's Major-Domo); Adrian de Peyer (An innkeeper); Unknown (Four lackeys); Unknown (Flutist); Unknown (Noble Widow); Unknown (Hairdresser); Unknown (Leupold))	2012	Classical Video Rarities (Note: No catalogue number exists for this release.)
25 July 1974	Wagner: Tristan und Isolde	Bayreuth Festival orchestra (& chorus)	Brilioth & Ligendza (Note: Helge Brilioth (Tristan); Catarina Ligendza (Isolde ); Kurt Moll (King Marke); Donald McIntyre (Kurwenal); Herbert Steinbach (Melot); Yvonne Minton (Brangäne); Unknown (Shepherd); Unknown (Helmsman); Heinz Zednik (Sailor))	1996	Hypnos HYP254/6
31 December 1974	Strauss II: Die Fledermaus	Bavarian State Orchestra (& chorus)	Wächter (Note: Eberhard Wächter (Gabriel von Eisenstein); Gundula Janowitz (Rosalinde); Benno Kusche (Frank); Brigitte Fassbaender (Prince Orlofsky); Waldemar Kmentt (Alfred); Unknown (Max); Lorenz Fehenberger (Dr Blind); Wolfgang Brendel (Dr. Falke); Carol Malone (Adele); Unknown (Ida); Unknown (Frosch); Unknown (Ivan))	1996	Hypnos HYP252/3
26 April 1975	Verdi: La traviata	Bavarian State Orchestra (& chorus)	Cotrubaș (Note: Ileana Cotrubaș (Violetta Valéry); Giacomo Aragall (Alfredo Germont); Wolfgang Brendel (Giorgio Germont); Doris Linser (Flora Bervoix); Helena Jungwirth (Annina); Will Brokmeir (Gastone de Letorières); Hans Wilbrink (Barone Douphol); Kar Hoppe (Marchese d'Obigny); Max Probstl (Dottore Grenvil); Unknown (Giuseppe); Unknown (Flora's servant); Paul Winter (Commissioner))	2004	Memories ME-1014/5
4 August 1975	Wagner: Tristan und Isolde	Bayreuth Festival orchestra (& chorus: Norbert Balatsch)	Brilioth & Ligendza (Note: Helge Brilioth (Tristan); Catarina Ligendza (Isolde ); Kurt Moll (King Marke); Donald McIntyre (Kurwenal); Heribert Steinbach (Melot); Yvonne Minton (Brangäne); Heinz Zednik (Shepherd); Nikolaus Hillebrand (Helmsman); Heinz Zednik (Sailor))	1992	Exclusive EX92T54/56
4 May 1976	R. Strauss: Der Rosenkavalier	La Scala orchestra (& chorus)	Lear (Note: Evelyn Lear (The Marschallin); Brigitte Fassbaender (Octavian); Karl Ridderbusch (Baron Ochs auf Lerchenau); Lucia Popp (Sophie von Faninal); Raymond Wolanky (Herr von Faninal); Silvana Zanolli (Marianne); Franco Casteliana (Valzacchi); Stefania Malagu (Annina); Unknown (A notary); Antonio Savastano (An Italian singer); Unknown (Three noble orphans); Unknown (A milliner); Unknown (A vendor of pets); Walter Gullino (Faninal's Major-Domo); Alfredo Giacomotti (A police inspector); Aronne Ceroni (The Marschallin's Major-Domo); Unknown (An innkeeper); Unknown (Four lackeys); Unknown (Flutist); Unknown (Noble Widow); Unknown (Hairdresser); Unknown (Leupold))	2000	Myto 3MCD002.218
30 July 1976	Wagner: Tristan und Isolde	Bayreuth Festival orchestra (& chorus)	Wenkoff & Ligendza (Note: Spas Wenkoff (Tristan); Catarina Ligendza (Isolde ); Karl Ridderbusch (King Marke); Donald McIntyre (Kurwenal); Heribert Steinbach (Melot); Yvonne Minton (Brangäne); Heinz Zednik (Shepherd); Heinz Feldhoff (Helmsman); Heinz Zednik (Sailor))	1989	Legendary LR196-4
7 December 1976	Verdi: Otello	La Scala orchestra (& chorus: Romano Gandolfi)	Domingo (Note: Plácido Domingo (Otello); Mirella Freni (Desdemona); Piero Cappuccilli (Iago); Jone Jori (Emilia); Giuliano Ciannella (Cassio); Dano Raffanti (Roderigo); Luigi Roni (Lodovico); Orazio Mori (Montano); Giuseppe Morresi (A herald))	1978	Bruno Walter Society IGI-302; Released as a VHS in 1996
6/14 May 1977 (Note: Toru Hirasawa records 14 May 1977 while Barber 2013, p. 305 records 6 May 1977.)	R. Strauss: Elektra	Royal Opera House orchestra (& chorus)	Nilsson (Note: Birgit Nilsson (Elektra); Gwyneth Jones (Chrysothemis); Marta Szirmay (Klytaemnestra); Unknown (Her confidante); Unknown (Her trainbearer); Unknown (A young servant); Unknown (An old servant); Donald McIntyre (Orest); Unknown (Orest's tutor); Charles Craig (Aegisth); Unknown (An overseer); Unknown (First maid); Unknown (Second maid); Unknown (Third maid); Unknown (Fourth maid); Unknown (Fifth maid))	1999	Golden Melodram 6.0001
16 June 1977	Verdi: La traviata	Bavarian State Orchestra (& chorus)	Maliponte (Note: Adriana Maliponte (Violetta Valéry); Benita Maresca (Alfredo Germont); Wolfgang Brendel (Giorgio Germont); Doris Linser (Flora Bervoix); Helene Jungwirth (Annina); Friedrich Lenz (Gastone de Letorières); Hans Wilbrink (Barone Douphol); Gerhard Auer (Marchese d'Obigny); Max Probstl (Dottore Grenvil); Rusolf Chizzali (Giuseppe); Markus Goritzky (Flora's servant); Hermann Sapell (Commissioner))	1999	Golden Melodram 6.000
15 July 1977	R. Strauss: Der Rosenkavalier	Bavarian State Orchestra (& chorus)	Jones (Note: Gwyneth Jones (The Marschallin); Brigitte Fassbaender (Octavian); Karl Ridderbusch (Baron Ochs auf Lerchenau); Lucia Popp (Sophie von Faninal); Benno Kusche (Herr von Faninal); Anneliese Waas (Marianne); David Thaw (Valzacchi); Gudrun Wewezow (Annina); Hans Wilbrink (A notary); Gerhard Unger (An Italian singer); Jana Schmid-Hutova, Ruth Folkert, Helena Jungwirth (Three noble orphans); Unknown (A milliner); Unknown (A vendor of pets); Franz Wilbrink (Faninal's Major-Domo); Albrecht Peter (A police inspector); Georg Paskuda (The Marschallin's Major-Domo); Lorenz Fehenberger (An innkeeper); Unknown (Four lackeys); Kirst Rix Forsman (Flutist); Unknown (Noble Widow); Unknown (Hairdresser); Unknown (Leupold))	?	Legendary LR179-4/LRCD1014-3
31 July 1977	R. Strauss: Der Rosenkavalier	Bavarian State Orchestra (& chorus)	Dernesch (Note: Helga Dernesch (The Marschallin); Brigitte Fassbaender (Octavian); Kurt Moll (Baron Ochs auf Lerchenau); Lucia Popp (Sophie von Faninal); Benno Kusche (Herr von Faninal); Anneliese Waas (Marianne); David Thaw (Valzacchi); Gudrun Wewezow (Annina); Hans Wilbrink (A notary); Gerhard Unger (An Italian singer); Unknown (Three noble orphans); Unknown (A milliner); Unknown (A vendor of pets); Franz Klarwein (Faninal's Major-Domo); Albrecht Peter (A police inspector); Georg Paskuda (The Marschallin's Major-Domo); Lorenz Fehenberger (An innkeeper); Unknown (Four lackeys); Kirst Rix Forsman (Flutist); Unknown (Noble Widow); Unknown (Hairdresser); Unknown (Leupold))	2003	Living Stage LS1040
31 October 1977	Verdi: Otello	Bavarian State Orchestra (& chorus)	Cossutta (Note: Carlo Cossutta (Otello); Julia Varady (Desdemona); Piero Cappuccilli (Iago); Gudrun Wewezow (Emilia); Benito Maresca (Cassio); Norbert Orth (Roderigo); Nikolaus Hillebrand (Lodovico); Hans Wilbrink (Montano); Unknown (A herald))	2006	Golden Melodram GM 5.0061
12 April 1978	Wagner: Tristan und Isolde	La Scala orchestra (& chorus)	Wenkoff & Ligendza (Note: Spas Wenkoff (Tristan); Catarina Ligendza (Isolde ); Kurt Moll (King Marke); Siegmund Nimsgern (Kurwenal); Gianpaolo Corradi (Melot); Ruža Pospiš-Baldani (Brangäne); Prero de Palma (Shepherd); Giovanno Foiani (Helmsman); Walter Gulling (Sailor))	1999	Myto 3MCD993.208
? April 1978 (Note: While listed as a recording from 5 April 1978, it is thought to be from a later date, either the 19, 23 or 26 April 1978.)	Wagner: Tristan und Isolde	La Scala orchestra (& chorus)	Wenkoff & Ligendza	2016	PremiereOpera PO30439
12 June 1978	Verdi: La traviata	Bavarian State Orchestra (& chorus: Hermann Sapell)	Cotrubaș (Note: Ileana Cotrubaș (Violetta Valéry); Giacomo Aragall (Alfredo Germont); Renato Bruson (Giorgio Germont); Doris Linser (Flora Bervoix); Helene Jungwirth (Annina); Friedrich Lenz (Gastone de Letorières); Hans Wilbrinck (Barone Douphol); Gerhard Auer (Marchese d'Obigny); Max Probstl (Dottore Grenvil); Rudolf Chizzali (Giuseppe); Markus Goritzky (Flora's servant); Unknown (Commissioner))	1993	Artists FED045/6
12 October 1978	Weber: Der Freischütz (Overture)	Chicago Symphony Orchestra	–	1990	Recitative 116
12 October 1978	Beethoven: Symphony No. 5	Chicago Symphony Orchestra	–	1990	Recitative 116
12 October 1978	Schubert: Symphony No. 3	Chicago Symphony Orchestra	–	1992	Exclusive EX92T21
9 December 1978	Bizet: Carmen	Vienna Philharmonic (& chorus: Norbert Balatsch)	Obraztsova (Note: Elena Obraztsova (Carmen); Plácido Domingo (Don José); Yuri Mazurok (Escamillo); Isobel Buchanan (Micaëla); Kurt Rydl (Zuniga); Hans Helm (Moralès); Cheryl Kanfoush (Frasquita); Axelle Gall (Mercédès); Unknown (Lillas Pastia); Paul Wolfrum (Le Dancaïre); Heinz Zednik (Le Remendado); Unknown (A guide))	1992	Exclusive EX92T11/12; Released as a DVD in 2004
22 March 1979	Puccini: La bohème	La Scala orchestra (& chorus)	Pavarotti & Cotrubaș (Note: Luciano Pavarotti (Rodolfo); Ileana Cotrubaș (Mimì); Piero Cappuccilli (Marcello); Lucia Popp (Musetta); Giorgio Giorgetti (Schaunard); Evghenij Nesterenko (Colline); Claudio Giombi (Benoît); Alfredo Giacomotti (Alcindoro); Regolo Romani (Parpignol); Carlo Meliciani (A customs Sergeant); Giuseppe Morresi (A customs officer))	1992	Exclusive EX92T01/2
30 March 1979	Puccini: La bohème	La Scala orchestra (& chorus)	Pavarotti & Cotrubaș	1990 (Note: The date of a Legendary (LR162-2) release is uncertain so it may be earlier than the Recitative (115) release.)	Recitative 115; Released as a VHS in 1997
7 November 1979	Puccini: La bohème	Royal Opera House orchestra (& chorus)	Aragall & Cotrubaș (Note: Giacomo Aragall (Rodolfo); Ileana Cotrubaș (Mimì); Jonathan Summers (Marcello); Sona Ghazarian (Musetta); John Rawnsley (Schaunard); Gwynne Howell (Colline); Eric Barett (Benoît); John Dobson (Alcindoro); Robert Bowman (Parpignol); Unknown (A customs Sergeant); Unknown (A customs officer))	1999	We love Carlos Society WLC 2-703
16 December 1979	Weber: Der Freischütz (Overture)	Vienna Philharmonic	–	1992	Exclusive EX92T25
16 December 1979	Mozart: Symphony No. 33	Vienna Philharmonic	–	1992	Casanova CA-002
16 December 1979	Brahms: Symphony No. 4	Vienna Philharmonic	–	1992	Casanova CA-002
February 1980 (Note: The exact date is unknown.)	Verdi: Otello (Act I Dress rehearsal)	Royal Opera House orchestra (& chorus: Romano Gandolfi)	Domingo (Note: Plácido Domingo (Otello); Mirella Freni (Desdemona); Piero Cappuccilli (Iago); Jone Jori (Emilia); Giuliano Ciannella (Cassio); Dano Raffanti (Roderigo); Luigi Roni (Lodovico); Orazio Mori (Montano); Giuseppe Morresi (A herald))	2013	Classical Video Rarities
19 February 1980	Verdi: Otello	Royal Opera House orchestra (& chorus: Romano Gandolfi)	Domingo	2001	Golden Melodram 5.0028
2 March 1981	Strauss II: "Thunder and Lightning"	Bavarian State Orchestra	–	1999	We love Carlos Society WLC 1-710
2 September 1981	Verdi: Otello	La Scala orchestra (& chorus); Tokyo Bunka Kaikan	Domingo (Note: Plácido Domingo (Otello); Anna Tomowa-Sintow (Desdemona); Silvano Carroli (Iago); Stefania Malagu (Emilia); Enzio Di Cesare (Cassio); Ermanno Lorenzi (Roderigo); Luigi Roni (Lodovico); Orazio Mori (Montano); Giuseppe Morresi (A herald))	1993	Artists FED020/21; Video recording exists
15 September 1981	Puccini: La bohème	La Scala orchestra (& chorus: Romano Gandolfi); Tokyo Bunka Kaikan	Dvorsky & Freni (Note: Peter Dvorsky (Rodolfo); Mirella Freni (Mimì); Lorenzo Saccomani (Marcello); Margherita Guglielmi (Musetta); Antonio Salvadori (Schaunard); Paolo Washington (Colline); Claudio Giombi (Benoît); Alfredo Giacomotti (Alcindoro); Saverio Porzano (Parpignol); Giuseppe Morresi (A customs Sergeant); Carlo Meliciani (A customs officer))	1993	Artists FED015/16; Video recording exists
28 February 1982	Haydn: Symphony No. 94	Vienna Philharmonic	–	1992	Exclusive EX91T13 or EX92T13
28 February 1982	Beethoven: Symphony No. 7	Vienna Philharmonic	–	1992	Exclusive EX91T25
3 May 1982	Beethoven: Symphony No. 4	Bavarian State Orchestra	–	1984	Orfeo C 100 841 A
3 May 1982	Beethoven: Symphony No. 7	Bavarian State Orchestra	–	2006	Orfeo C 700 051 C
7 November 1983	Haydn: Symphony No. 94	Bavarian State Orchestra	–	2000	We love Carlos Society WLC 1-712
7 November 1983	Beethoven: Symphony No. 6	Bavarian State Orchestra	–	2000	We love Carlos Society WLC 1-712
2 June 1983	Butterworth: English Idyll No. 1	Chicago Symphony Orchestra	–	1993	Artists FED 045.46
2 June 1983	Mozart: Symphony No. 33	Chicago Symphony Orchestra	–	2001	Passion & Concentration PACO1021
2 June 1983	Brahms: Symphony No. 2	Chicago Symphony Orchestra	–	2001	Passion & Concentration PACO1021
9 December 1984	Verdi: La traviata	Orchestra del Maggio Musicale Fiorentino (& chorus: Roberto Gabbiani)	Gasdia (Note: Cecilia Gasdia (Violetta Valéry); Peter Dvorski (Alfredo Germont); Giorgio Zancanaro (Giorgio Germont); Edith Martelli (Flora Bervoix); Giuliana Matteini (Annina); Maurizio Barbacini (Gastone de Letorières); Guido Mazzini (Barone Douphol); Giorgio Giorgetti (Marchese d'Obigny); Leonardo Monreale (Dottore Grenvil); Ottavio Taddei (Giuseppe); Mario Frosini (Flora's servant); Augusto Frati (Commissioner))	1992	Exclusive EX92T42/43
20 December 1984	Verdi: La traviata	Orchestra del Maggio Musicale Fiorentino (& chorus: Roberto Gabbiani)	Gasdia	2014	Maggio Live OF004
18 January 1985	Puccini: La bohème (Scenes from Act IV)	Vienna Philharmonic (& chorus)	Pavarotti & Freni (Note: Luciano Pavarotti (Rodolfo); Mirella Freni (Mimì); Wolfgang Brendel (Marcello); Margarita Guglielmi (Musetta); Orazio Mori (Schaunard))	2010	Orfeo C 806 1021
10 March 1986	Butterworth: English Idyll No. 1	Bavarian State Orchestra	–	2007	Vibrato VLL 217
10 March 1986	Schubert: Symphony No. 3	Bavarian State Orchestra	–	2000	We love Carlos Society WLC 1-713
10 March 1986	Brahms: Symphony No. 4	Bavarian State Orchestra	–	2000	We love Carlos Society WLC 1-713
19 May 1986 (Note: According to Barber: "The spring of 1986 was wholly occupied by concert music and in taking the Bavarian State Opera Orchestra on tour. ... Its repertoire consisted of Beethoven, Symphony No. 4 and No. 7; Brahms, Symphony No. 4; Butterworth, English Idyll No. 1; Schubert, Symphony No. 3; and Weber, Der Freischütz Overture. At the end of April the whole group flew to Japan. They gave the same programs, slightly re-ordered, in Tokyo (five times), ... On 19 May, at Hitomi Memorial Hall, ... two encores. Carlos and his orchestra toured Japan from 9 to 19 May that year, the only such tour they would undertake together." (emphasis added). For the concert on 19 May 1986 in Hitomi Memorial Hall, see also Toru Hirasawa's page on Kleiber's concert agenda for May 1986. When listing the recordings made on 19 May in Hitomi Memorial Hall, Barber, in Appendix B, pp. 309–314, mentions 1985 as year these recordings were made. Toru Hirasawa's website has "May 19, 1986" on the page dedicated to recordings of the concert, which is the date followed in the current listing.)	Beethoven: Symphony No. 4	Bavarian State Orchestra; Hitomi Memorial Hall, Tokyo	–	1994	Topazio 2604.10; Video recording exists
19 May 1986	Beethoven: Symphony No. 7	Bavarian State Orchestra; Hitomi Memorial Hall, Tokyo	–	1994	Topazio 2604.10; Video recording exists
19 May 1986	Strauss II: Die Fledermaus (Overture)	Bavarian State Orchestra; Hitomi Memorial Hall, Tokyo	–	1994	Topazio 2604.10; Video recording exists
19 May 1986	Strauss II: "Thunder and Lightning"	Bavarian State Orchestra; Hitomi Memorial Hall, Tokyo	–	1994	Topazio 2604.10; Video recording exists
5 February 1987	Verdi: Otello	La Scala orchestra (& chorus); Tokyo Bunka Kaikan	Domingo (Note: Domingo: Plácido Domingo (Otello); Mirella Freni (Desdemona); Renato Bruson (Iago); Gloria Banditelli (Emilia); Ernesto Gavazzi (Cassio); Gianfranco Manganotti (Roderigo); Luigi Roni (Lodovico); Angelo Nosotti (Montano); Silvestro Sammaritano (A herald))	1999	We love Carlos Society WLC 2-706
20 September 1987	Mozart: Symphony No. 36	Bavarian State Orchestra; Teatro Grande (Pompei)	–	1993	Artists FED 019
20 September 1987	Brahms: Symphony No. 2	Bavarian State Orchestra; Teatro Grande (Pompei)	–	1993	Artists FED 019
1 February 1988	Puccini: La bohème	Metropolitan Opera orchestra (& chorus)	Pavarotti & Freni (Note: Luciano Pavarotti (Rodolfo); Mirella Freni (Mimì); Jonathan Summers (Marcello); Barbara Daniels (Musetta); Thomas Hampson (Schaunard); Gwynne Howell (Colline); Mario Giombi (Benoît & Alcindoro); Saverio Porzano (Parpignol); Unknown (A customs Sergeant); Unknown (A customs officer))	2003	Lyrica LR59
20 March 1988	Mozart: Symphony No. 36	Vienna Philharmonic	–	1992	Exclusive EX92T13
20 March 1988	Brahms: Symphony No. 2	Vienna Philharmonic	–	1992	Exclusive EX92T10
1 January 1989 (Note: Since the concert began in the late evening of 31 December 1988, technically the dates are 31 December 1988 – 1 January 1989)	Vienna New Year's Concert (Various pieces) (Note: The 1 January 1989 Vienna New Year's Concert program was: Strauss II: "Accelerationen"; Strauss II: "Bauern-Polka"; Strauss II: "Bei uns z'Haus"; Josef Strauss: "Die Libelle"; Strauss II: Die Fledermaus (Overture); Strauss II: "Künstlerleben"; Josef Strauss: "Moulinet-Polka"; Strauss II: "Éljen a Magyar!"; Strauss II: "Im Krapfenwald'l"; Strauss II: "Frühlingsstimmen"; Josef Strauss & Johann Strauss II: "Pizzicato Polka"; Strauss II: Ritter Pázmán: Csardas; Josef Strauss: "Plappermäulchen"; Josef Strauss: "Jockey-Polka"; Strauss II: "An der schönen, blauen Donau"; Strauss I: Radetzky March)	Vienna Philharmonic	–	1989	Sony Classical MK2 45564; Released as a LD in 1989
9 March 1989	Mozart: Symphony No. 36	Berlin Philharmonic	–	1999	We love Carlos Society WLC 1-709
19 March 1990	Verdi: Otello	Metropolitan Opera orchestra (& chorus)	Domingo (Note: Plácido Domingo (Otello); Katia Ricciarelli (Desdemona); Justino Díaz (Iago); Sondra Kelly (Emilia); Barry McCauley (Cassio); Charles Anthony (Roderigo); Paul Plishka (Lodovico); Vernon Hartman (Montano); Unknown (A herald))	2013	Classical Video Rarities
17, 20 October 1990	R. Strauss: Der Rosenkavalier	Metropolitan Opera orchestra (& chorus: John Keenan)	Lott (Note: Felicity Lott (The Marschallin); Anne Sofie von Otter (Octavian); Aage Haugland (Baron Ochs auf Lerchenau); Barbara Bonney (Sophie von Faninal); Gottfried Hornik (Herr von Faninal); Juliana Gondek (Marianne); Anthony Laciura (Valzacchi); Sarah Walker (Annina); James Courtney (A notary); Stanford Olsen (An Italian singer); Beverly Withers, Linda Mays, Jean Rawn (Three noble orphans); Deborah Saverance (A milliner); John Harriot (A vendor of pets); Michael Best (Faninal's Major-Domo); Jeffrey Wells (A police inspector); Nico Castel (The Marschallin's Major-Domo); Charles Anthony (An innkeeper); Arthur Apy, Frank Coffey, John Bills, Donald Peck (Four lackeys); Unknown (Flutist); Elizabeth Anguish (Noble Widow); Sam Cardea (Hairdresser); Ross Crolius (Leupold))	1993	Exclusive EX93T69/71
1 January 1992 (Note: Since the concert began in the late evening of 31 December 1991, technically the dates are 31 December 1991 – 1 January 1992)	Vienna New Year's Concert (Various pieces) (Note: The 1 January 1992 Vienna New Year's Concert program was: Nicolai: Die lustigen Weiber von Windsor; Strauss II: "Stadt und Land"; Josef Strauss: "Dorfschwalben aus Österreich"; Josef Strauss: "Feuenfest!"; Strauss II: "Vergnungszug"; Strauss II: Der Zigeunerbaron (Overture); Strauss II: "Tausend und eine Nacht"; Strauss II: "Neue Pizzicato Polka"; Strauss II: "Persischer Marsch"; Strauss II: "Tritsch-Tratsch-Polka"; Josef Strauss: "Sphärenklaege"; Strauss II: "Unter Donner und Blitz"; Josef Strauss: "Jockey-Polka"; Strauss II: "An der schönen, blauen Donau"; Strauss I: Radetzky March)	Vienna Philharmonic	–	1992	Sony Classical SK 48 376; Released as a LD in 1992
16 May 1993	Mozart: Symphony No. 33	Vienna Philharmonic	–	1997	First Classics FC-116.7
16 May 1993	R. Strauss: Ein Heldenleben	Vienna Philharmonic	–	1997	Dumka DCD-30-1
28 June 1994	Beethoven: Coriolan Overture	Berlin Philharmonic	–	1999	We love Carlos Society WLC 1-704
28 June 1994	Mozart: Symphony No. 33	Berlin Philharmonic	–	1999	We love Carlos Society WLC 1-704
28 June 1994	Brahms: Symphony No. 4	Berlin Philharmonic	–	1999	We love Carlos Society WLC 1-704
7 October 1994	R. Strauss: Der Rosenkavalier	Vienna Philharmonic (& chorus); Tokyo Bunka Kaikan	Lott (Note: Felicity Lott (The Marschallin); Anne Sofie von Otter (Octavian); Kurt Moll (Baron Ochs auf Lerchenau); Barbara Bonney (Sophie von Faninal); Gottfried Hornik (Herr von Faninal); Unknown (Marianne); Unknown (Valzacchi); Unknown (Annina); Unknown (A notary); Unknown (An Italian singer); Unknown (Three noble orphans); Unknown (A milliner); Unknown (A vendor of pets); Unknown (Faninal's Major-Domo); Unknown (A police inspector); Unknown (The Marschallin's Major-Domo); Unknown (An innkeeper); Unknown (Four lackeys); Unknown (Flutist); Unknown (Noble Widow); Unknown (Hairdresser); Unknown (Leupold))	2004	Curtain Call CCCD-1001/3
5 April 1996	Beethoven: Coriolan Overture	Bavarian State Orchestra	–	1999	We love Carlos Society WLC 1-707
5 April 1996	Mozart: Symphony No. 33	Bavarian State Orchestra	–	1999	We love Carlos Society WLC 1-707
5 April 1996	Brahms: Symphony No. 4	Bavarian State Orchestra	–	1999	We love Carlos Society WLC 1-707
21 October 1996	Beethoven: Coriolan Overture	Bavarian State Orchestra	–	1997	Dumka DCD-30-02; Released as a DVD in 2004
21 October 1996	Mozart: Symphony No. 33	Bavarian State Orchestra	–	1997	Dumka DCD-30-02; Released as a DVD in 2004
21 October 1996	Brahms: Symphony No. 4	Bavarian State Orchestra	–	1997	Dumka DCD-30-02; Released as a DVD in 2004
6 June 1997	Brahms: Symphony No. 4	Slovenian Philharmonic Orchestra	–	1999	Link 600-1
18 June 1997	Brahms: Symphony No. 4	Bavarian State Orchestra	–	1999	We love Carlos Society WLC 1-710
7 January 1999	Beethoven: Symphony No. 4	Bavarian Radio Symphony Orchestra	–	1999	We love Carlos Society WLC 1-701
7 January 1999	Beethoven: Symphony No. 7	Bavarian Radio Symphony Orchestra	–	1999	We love Carlos Society WLC 1-701
9 January 1999	Beethoven: Symphony No. 4	Bavarian Radio Symphony Orchestra	–	1999	We love Carlos Society WLC 1-702
9 January 1999	Beethoven: Symphony No. 7	Bavarian Radio Symphony Orchestra	–	1999	We love Carlos Society WLC 1-702
20 February 1999	Beethoven: Symphony No. 4	Bavarian Radio Symphony Orchestra	–	1999	We love Carlos Society WLC 1-705
20 February 1999	Beethoven: Symphony No. 7	Bavarian Radio Symphony Orchestra	–	1999	We love Carlos Society WLC 1-705
24 February 1999	Beethoven: Symphony No. 4	Bavarian Radio Symphony Orchestra	–	1999	We love Carlos Society WLC 1-708
24 February 1999	Beethoven: Symphony No. 7	Bavarian Radio Symphony Orchestra	–	1999	We love Carlos Society WLC 1-708
26 February 1999	Strauss II: Die Fledermaus (Overture)	Bavarian Radio Symphony Orchestra	–	2006	Memories ME-1071
26 February 1999	Beethoven: Symphony No. 4	Bavarian Radio Symphony Orchestra	–	1999	We love Carlos Society WLC 1-711
26 February 1999	Beethoven: Symphony No. 7	Bavarian Radio Symphony Orchestra	–	1999	We love Carlos Society WLC 1-711
=== Live video recordings ===
27 January 1970	Weber: Der Freischütz: (Overture) (& January rehearsal)	Stuttgart Radio Symphony Orchestra	–	1996	Toshiba-EMI TOLW-3751/4 (LD)
27 January 1970	Strauss II: Die Fledermaus (Overture) (& January rehearsal)	Stuttgart Radio Symphony Orchestra	–	1996	Toshiba-EMI TOLW-3751/4 (LD)
1974 – 1976	Wagner: Tristan und Isolde (excerpts)	Bayreuth Festival orchestra (& chorus)	Unknown cast (Note: Perhaps one of the various casts from Bayreuth performances in 1974, 1975 or 1976.)	–	Unknown (Note: Not commercially available; Barber 2013, p. 312 notes that recordings are available at Stanford University's archives and online.)
7 December 1976	Verdi: Otello	La Scala orchestra (& chorus: Romano Gandolfi)	Domingo	1996	Bel Canto Society BCS-0676 (VHS)
9 December 1978	Bizet: Carmen	Vienna State Opera orchestra (& chorus: Norbert Balatsch)	Obraztsova (Note: Elena Obraztsova (Carmen); Plácido Domingo (Don José); Yuri Mazurok (Escamillo); Isobel Buchanan (Micaëla); Kurt Rydl (Zuniga); Hans Helm (Moralès); Cheryl Kanfoush (Frasquita); Axelle Gall; Unknown (Lillas Pastia); Paul Wolfrum (Le Dancaïre); Heinz Zednik (Le Remendado); Unknown (A guide))	2004	TDK DVCS-CLOPCAR (DVD) (Note: Many earlier recordings exist, with Bel Canto Society BCS-0696 (VHS) in 1999 as the first; TDK DVCS-CLOPCAR (DVD) is the official release.)
30 March 1979	Puccini: La bohème	La Scala orchestra (& chorus)	Pavarotti & Cotrubaș	1997	Opera Video 101 (VHS)
? May, June 1979	R. Strauss: Der Rosenkavalier	Bavarian State Orchestra (& chorus: Josef Beischer)	Jones (Note: Gwyneth Jones (The Marschallin); Brigitte Fassbaender (Octavian); Manfred Jungwirth (Baron Ochs auf Lerchenau); Lucia Popp (Sophie von Faninal); Benno Kusche (Herr von Faninal); Anneliese Waas (Marianne); David Thaw (Valzacchi); Gudrun Wewezow (Annina); Hans Wilbrink (A notary); Francisco Araiza (An Italian singer); Evi List, Doris Linswe, Judith Auer (Three noble orphans); Isoldé Elchlepp (A milliner); Osamu Kobayashi (A vendor of pets); Friedrich Lenz (Faninal's Major-Domo); Albrecht Peter (A police inspector); Georg Paskuda (The Marschallin's Major-Domo); Norbert Orth (An innkeeper); Rudolf Schwab, Walter Brem, Werner Liebl, Artur Horn (Four lackeys); Unknown (Flutist); Elizabeth von Ihering (Noble Widow); Unknown (Hairdresser); Ross Crolius (Leupold))	2005	DG 072 605-1 (LD)
25, 27 April 1981	Beethoven: Coriolan Overture	Vienna Philharmonic; Teatro Juárez	–	–	GTO: (TV: 25, 27 April)
25, 27 April 1981	Strauss II: Die Fledermaus (Overture)	Vienna Philharmonic; Teatro Juárez	–	–	GTO: (TV: 25, 27 April)
25, 27 April 1981	Beethoven: Symphony No. 5	Vienna Philharmonic; Teatro Juárez	–	–	GTO: (TV: 25, 27 April)
25, 27 April 1981	Strauss II: "Thunder and Lightning"	Vienna Philharmonic; Teatro Juárez	–	–	GTO: (TV: 25, 27 April)
2 September 1981	Verdi: Otello	La Scala orchestra (& chorus); Tokyo Bunka Kaikan	Domingo	–	NHK (TV: 2 September)
15 September 1981	Puccini: La bohème	La Scala orchestra (& chorus: Romano Gandolfi); Tokyo Bunka Kaikan	Dvorsky & Freni	–	NHK (TV: 15 September)
19, 20 October 1983	Beethoven: Symphony No. 4	Royal Concertgebouw Orchestra	–	1988	Philips 070 300-1 (LD)
19, 20 October 1983	Beethoven: Symphony No. 7	Royal Concertgebouw Orchestra	–	1988	Philips 070 300-1 (LD)
19 May 1986	Beethoven: Symphony No. 4	Bavarian State Orchestra; Hitomi Memorial Hall, Tokyo	–	–	NHK (TV: 19 May)
19 May 1986	Beethoven: Symphony No. 7	Bavarian State Orchestra; Hitomi Memorial Hall, Tokyo	–	–	NHK (TV: 19 May)
19 May 1986	Strauss II: Die Fledermaus (Overture)	Bavarian State Orchestra; Hitomi Memorial Hall, Tokyo	–	–	NHK (TV: 19 May)
19 May 1986	Strauss II: "Thunder and Lightning"	Bavarian State Orchestra; Hitomi Memorial Hall, Tokyo	–	–	NHK (TV: 19 May)
30, 31 December 1986	Strauss II: Die Fledermaus	Bavarian State Orchestra (& chorus: Udo Mehrpohl)	Wächter (Note: Eberhard Wächter (Gabriel von Eisenstein); Pamela Coburn (Rosalinde); Benno Kusche (Frank); Brigitte Fassbaender (Prince Orlofsky); Josef Hopferwieser (Alfred); Wolfgang Brendel (Max); Ferry Gruber (Dr Blind); Janet Perry (Adele); Irene Steinbeisser (Ida); Franz Muxeneder (Frosch); Ivan Unger (Ivan))	2005	DG 072 500-1 (LD)
1 January 1989	Vienna New Year's Concert	Vienna Philharmonic	–	1989	DG 072 246-1 (LD)
6–7 October 1991	Mozart: Symphony No. 36	Vienna Philharmonic	–	1992	Philips 070 261-1 (LD)
6–7 October 1991	Brahms: Symphony No. 2	Vienna Philharmonic	–	1992	Philips 070 261-1 (LD)
1 January 1992	Vienna New Year's Concert	Vienna Philharmonic	–	1992	Philips 070 352-1 (LD)
23 March 1994	R. Strauss: Der Rosenkavalier	Vienna Philharmonic (& chorus: Dietrich D. Gerpheide); Tokyo Bunka Kaikan	Lott (Note: Felicity Lott (The Marschallin); Anne Sofie von Otter (Octavian); Kurt Moll (Baron Ochs auf Lerchenau); Barbara Bonney (Sophie von Faninal); Gottfried Hornik (Herr von Faninal); Olivera Miljaković (Marianne); Heinz Zednik (Valzacchi); Anna Gonda (Annina); Wolfgang Bankl (A notary); Keith Ikaia-Purdy (An Italian singer); Felicitas Equiluz, Marianne Sattmann, Elida Zurmann (Three noble orphans); Lotte Leitner (A milliner); Ulrich Großrubatscher (A vendor of pets); Franz Kasemann (Faninal's Major-Domo); Peter Wimberger (A police inspector); Waldemar Kmentt (The Marschallin's Major-Domo); Peter Jelosits (An innkeeper); Robert Werner, Werner Kamenik, Karl Nebenführ, Josef Pogatschnig (Four lackeys); Unknown (Flutist); Ingeborg Piffl (Noble Widow); Heinz Totzler (Hairdresser); Jörg Schneider (Leupold))	2001	DG 072 643-1 (LD)
21 October 1996	Beethoven: Coriolan Overture	Bavarian State Orchestra	–	2004	DG 00440 073 4017 (DVD)
21 October 1996	Mozart: Symphony No. 33	Bavarian State Orchestra	–	2004	DG 00440 073 4017 (DVD)
21 October 1996	Brahms: Symphony No. 4	Bavarian State Orchestra	–	2004	DG 00440 073 4017 (DVD)
? December 1996	R. Strauss: Der Rosenkavalier	Vienna Philharmonic (& chorus)	Lott (Note: Felicity Lott (The Marschallin); Anne Sofie von Otter (Octavian); Kurt Moll (Baron Ochs auf Lerchenau); Barbara Bonney (Sophie von Faninal); Unknown (Herr von Faninal); Unknown (Marianne); Unknown (Valzacchi); Unknown (Annina); Unknown (A notary); Unknown (An Italian singer); Unknown (Three noble orphans); Unknown (A milliner); Unknown (A vendor of pets); Unknown (Faninal's Major-Domo); Unknown (A police inspector); Unknown (The Marschallin's Major-Domo); Unknown (An innkeeper); Unknown (Four lackeys); Unknown (Flutist); Unknown (Noble Widow); Unknown (Hairdresser); Unknown (Leupold))	–	3sat (TV: December)

== Compilations ==
Compilations
Year	Title	Contents	Discs
2010	Complete Recordings on Deutsche Grammophon	Weber: Der Freischütz (1973) - SD; Beethoven: Symphony No. 5 (1975) - VPO; Beethoven: Symphony No. 7 (1976) - VPO; Strauss II: Die Fledermaus (1976) - BRSO; Verdi: La traviata (1977) - BRSO; Dvořák: Piano Concerto (1977) - BRSO; Schubert: Symphony Nos. 3 & 8 (1979) - VPO; Brahms: Symphony No. 4 (1981) - VPO; Wagner: Tristan und Isolde (1982) - SD	12 CDs
2014	Complete Orchestral Recordings on Deutsche Grammophon	Beethoven: Symphony No. 5 (1975) - VPO; Beethoven: Symphony No. 7 (1976) - VPO; Schubert: Symphony Nos. 3 & 8 (1979) - VPO; Brahms: Symphony No. 4 (1981) - VPO	4 CDs

== Posthumous documentaries ==
Posthumous documentaries
Year	Title	Director	Features	Production
2010	Carlos Kleiber – I Am Lost to the World	Georg Wübbolt	Ileana Cotrubas; Michael Gielen; Riccardo Muti; Otto Schenk; Ioan Holender; Peter Jonas	C Major Entertainment 715304
2011	Carlos Kleiber – Traces to Nowhere	Eric Schulz	Plácido Domingo; Brigitte Fassbaender; Michael Gielen; Manfred Honeck; Veronika Kleiber; Otto Schenk	Arthaus Musik 101553
