= Vienna Philharmonic discography =

This is an undated alphabetical list of audio and video recordings by the Vienna Philharmonic orchestra. Founded in 1842, the orchestra has a long history of recording music dating back to 1905. The orchestra has made numerous critically acclaimed recordings, of which several have been ranked as the greatest classical recordings of all time, such as Beethoven's Symphonies Nos. 5 & 7 with Carlos Kleiber and Wagner's complete Ring des Nibelungen with Sir Georg Solti. The orchestra has primarily made recordings with the Deutsche Grammophon, EMI and Decca labels.

== Audio recordings ==
- Beethoven : Complete Piano Concertos (this cycle was recorded with Vladimir Ashkenazy, Alfred Brendel, Maurizio Pollini and Krystian Zimerman).
- Beethoven : Symphony No. 3 conducted by Felix Weingartner, also conducted by Erich Kleiber
- Beethoven, Symphony No. 5, Symphony No. 7 conducted by Carlos Kleiber
- Beethoven : Complete Symphonies conducted by Karl Böhm; this cycle was also recorded with Leonard Bernstein, Hans Schmidt-Isserstedt, Claudio Abbado, Simon Rattle and Christian Thielemann
- Berg : the Wozzeck and Lulu operas, conducted by Christoph von Dohnányi
- Berlioz : Symphonie fantastique, conducted by Sir Colin Davis, also conducted by Valery Gergiev and Bernard Haitink
- Bernstein : Candide, conducted by Zubin Mehta
- Borodin : Symphony No. 2 conducted by Rafael Kubelík
- Brahms : Symphony No. 2 conducted by Wilhelm Furtwängler
- Brahms : Symphony No. 4 conducted by Carlos Kleiber
- Brahms : Complete Symphonies conducted by Karl Böhm; this cycle was also recorded with John Barbirolli, István Kertész, James Levine, Carlo Maria Giulini and Leonard Bernstein
- Brahms : Ein Deutsches Requiem conducted by Herbert von Karajan, also recorded by Carlo Maria Giulini, Otto Klemperer, Bernard Haitink and Nikolaus Harnoncourt
- Brahms : Complete Concertos, with Krystian Zimerman, piano, Gidon Kremer, violin and Mischa Maisky, cello, conducted by Leonard Bernstein. The Orchestra has also recorded the Brahms piano concertos with Maurizio Pollini, with Karl Böhm conducting in No. 1 and Claudio Abbado conducting in No. 2
- Bruckner : Symphony No. 4 conducted by Karl Böhm
- Bruckner : Symphony No. 7 and 8 conducted by Karl Böhm, Herbert von Karajan and Georg Solti
- Bruckner : Symphonies Nos. 7, 8 and 9 conducted by Carlo Maria Giulini
- Bruckner : Symphonies Nos. 8 and 9 conducted by Carl Schuricht
- Bruckner : Symphonies Nos. 3, 4, 5, 8 and Te Deum conducted by Bernard Haitink
- Bruckner : Symphonies Nos. 5 and 9 conducted by Nikolaus Harnoncourt
- Bruckner : Symphony No. 8 conducted by Pierre Boulez
- Dvořák : Symphonies Nos. 7, 8 and 9, conducted by Lorin Maazel, recordings of nos. 8 & 9 were also made under Herbert von Karajan and Seiji Ozawa. The Orchestra has also recorded Nos. 7 & 9 with Rafael Kubelík
- Dvořák : Symphony No. 9 conducted by Kirill Kondrashin
- Dvořák : Symphonies Nos. 6 and 8, conducted by Myung-whun Chung
- Elgar : Enigma Variations conducted by Sir Georg Solti, also conducted by Sir John Eliot Gardiner
- Glass : Violin Concerto No. 1 with Gidon Kremer, violin, conducted by Christoph von Dohnányi
- Holst : The Planets, conducted by Herbert von Karajan
- Khachaturian : excerpts from Spartacus and Gayane conducted by Aram Khachaturian
- Mahler : The Song of the Earth (Das Lied von der Erde) with Kathleen Ferrier (contralto), conducted by Bruno Walter, also conducted by Leonard Bernstein with James King and Dietrich Fischer-Dieskau, Pierre Boulez with Michael Schade and Violeta Urmana, and Carlo Maria Giulini with Francisco Araiza and Brigitte Fassbaender
- Mahler : Complete Symphonies (1–9 plus the Adagio of Symphony No. 10) conducted by Lorin Maazel and Leonard Bernstein (on DVD, except Symphony No. 2)
- Mahler : Symphony No. 2 conducted by Pierre Boulez, also recorded with Claudio Abbado, Zubin Mehta, James Levine and Gilbert Kaplan
- Mahler : Symphony No. 3 conducted by Pierre Boulez, also recorded with Claudio Abbado and Bernard Haitink
- Mahler : Symphony No. 5 conducted by Pierre Boulez, also recorded with Leonard Bernstein
- Mahler : Symphony No. 6 conducted by Pierre Boulez, also recorded with Leonard Bernstein
- Mahler : Symphony No. 9 conducted by Claudio Abbado, also recorded with Simon Rattle
- Mendelssohn : Complete Symphonies conducted by Christoph von Dohnányi
- Mendelssohn : Symphony No. 5 and another works conducted by Franz Welser-Möst and Fabio Luisi
- Mozart : Symphonies Nos. 25, 29, 35, 36 conducted by Leonard Bernstein, also recorded with István Kertész
- Mozart : Symphonies Nos. 33, 39, 40 conducted by István Kertész
- Mozart : Symphonies Nos. 38-41 conducted by Karl Böhm, also recorded with Leonard Bernstein
- Mozart : Symphonies Nos. 1-41 conducted by James Levine
- Mozart : Die Entführung aus dem Serail, conducted by Josef Krips (two recordings), also recorded with Georg Solti
- Mozart : The Marriage of Figaro conducted by Erich Kleiber, also recorded with Herbert von Karajan (two recordings), Erich Leinsdorf, Claudio Abbado and Riccardo Muti
- Mozart : Don Giovanni conducted by Josef Krips, also recorded with Erich Leinsdorf and Riccardo Muti
- Mozart : Così fan tutte conducted by Karl Böhm, also recorded with James Levine
- Mozart : Die Zauberflöte, conducted by Sir Georg Solti (two recordings); the orchestra has also recorded the opera under Karl Böhm, Herbert von Karajan and James Levine
- Mozart : Requiem conducted by Herbert von Karajan, also recorded with István Kertész, Karl Böhm and Georg Solti
- Mussorgsky : Pictures at an Exhibition (arr. Ravel), conducted by Valery Gergiev, also recorded with André Previn, Gustavo Dudamel
- Orff : Carmina Burana, conducted by André Previn
- Prokofiev : Peter and the Wolf, with Hermione Gingold, conducted by Karl Böhm
- Rimsky-Korsakov : Scheherazade, conducted by Seiji Ozawa, also conducted by André Previn
- Arnold Schoenberg : Erwartung, Op.17, conducted by Christoph von Dohnányi
- Schoenberg : Gurre-Lieder, conducted by Claudio Abbado
- Schubert : Symphony No. 8 conducted by Carl Schuricht
- Schubert: Symphony No. 9 conducted by Josef Krips, also conducted by Sir Georg Solti and John Eliot Gardiner
- Schubert : Complete Symphonies conducted by István Kertész
- Schumann : Complete Symphonies, Cello & Piano Concertos conducted by Leonard Bernstein with Mischa Maisky and Justus Frantz
- Sibelius : Complete Symphonies conducted by Lorin Maazel
- Sibelius : Symphonies Nos. 1, 2, 5 and 7, conducted by Leonard Bernstein
- Smetana : Má vlast conducted by James Levine, also conducted by Rafael Kubelík
- Johann Strauss II and Strauss family, works recorded at the traditional New Year's Day concert conducted by Herbert von Karajan, Claudio Abbado, Carlos Kleiber, Nikolaus Harnoncourt, Riccardo Muti etc. (See also: The New Year Concert of the Vienna Philharmonic Orchestra)
- Richard Strauss : Eine Alpensinfonie, conducted by Seiji Ozawa, also conducted by Hans Knappertsbusch, André Previn and Christian Thielemann
- Richard Strauss : Also sprach Zarathustra, conducted by Herbert von Karajan, also conducted by Lorin Maazel, Clemens Krauss and André Previn
- Richard Strauss : Ein Heldenleben, conducted by Clemens Krauss, also conducted by Georg Solti, Christian Thielemann, André Previn and Karl Böhm
- Richard Strauss : Der Rosenkavalier, conducted by Erich Kleiber, also conducted by George Szell, Clemens Krauss, Hans Knappertsbusch, Robert Heger, Leonard Bernstein, Sir Georg Solti, Christoph von Dohnányi, Herbert von Karajan, Semyon Bychkov
- Igor Stravinsky : The Firebird, conducted by Christoph von Dohnányi
- Igor Stravinsky : Petrushka, conducted by Christoph von Dohnányi, also recorded with Lorin Maazel
- Igor Stravinsky : Le Sacre du printemps, conducted by Zubin Mehta, also recorded with Lorin Maazel
- Tchaikovsky : Ballet Suites conducted by James Levine, also recorded with Herbert von Karajan
- Tchaikovsky: Symphonies Nos. 4–6 conducted by Valery Gergiev, also recorded with Rafael Kubelík, Lorin Maazel and Herbert von Karajan
- Verdi : Requiem conducted by Georg Solti, also recorded with Nikolaus Harnoncourt, Herbert von Karajan, Claudio Abbado and Fritz Reiner
- Wagner : Die Walküre, first act, conducted by Bruno Walter
- Wagner : Die Walküre (complete), conducted by Wilhelm Furtwängler
- Wagner : Der Ring des Nibelungen, conducted by Georg Solti, voted by Gramophone as the century's finest classical record.
- Williams : arrangements of music from "Star Wars", "Raiders of the Lost Ark", "Close Encounters of the Third Kind", and other film scores, including arrangements for violin and orchestra, with Anne-Sophie Mutter performing as the soloist. Conducted by Williams.
