= Carlos Kleiber =

German-born Austrian conductor (1930–2004)

- Born: Karl Ludwig Bonifacius Kleiber; 3 July 1930; Berlin, Germany
- Died: 13 July 2004 (aged 74); Konjšica, Municipality of Litija, Slovenia
- Occupation: Conductor
- Parents: Erich Kleiber (father); Ruth Goodrich (mother)

Carlos Kleiber (3 July 1930 – 13 July 2004) was a German-born Austrian conductor, who is widely regarded as among the greatest conductors of all time. The son of the conductor Erich Kleiber, he was particularly known for the Romantic repertoire. John Rockwell writes: "A fabled perfectionist, he demanded long hours of rehearsal as his reputation grew and allowed him to obtain such concessions. But he made all that work pay off in performances that blended exactitude with impassioned spontaneity." He disliked making recordings, and his discography is small compared to his contemporaries.

== Early life ==
Kleiber was born as Karl Ludwig Bonifacius Kleiber in Berlin in 1930, the son of the eminent Austrian conductor Erich Kleiber and American Ruth Goodrich (née Baumgardner, 1900 – 1967), from Waterloo, Iowa. In 1935, the Kleiber family emigrated to Buenos Aires and Karl was renamed Carlos. As a youth, he had an English governess and grew up in English boarding schools. He also composed, sang, and played piano and timpani. While his father noticed his son's musical talents, he nevertheless dissuaded Carlos from pursuing a musical career: "What a pity the boy is musically talented", wrote Erich to a friend.

Carlos first studied chemistry at ETH Zurich but soon decided to dedicate himself to music. He was répétiteur at the Gärtnerplatz Theatre in Munich in 1952 and made his conducting debut with the operetta Gasparone at Potsdam theatre in 1954. From 1958 to 1964 he was Kapellmeister at the Deutsche Oper am Rhein in Düsseldorf and Duisburg, and then at the Opera in Zurich from 1964 to 1966. Between 1966 and 1973 he was first Kapellmeister in Stuttgart, his last permanent post. During the following years, he often conducted at the Bavarian State Opera in Munich.

During his time at Düsseldorf his operatic repertoire included Giuseppe Verdi's La traviata, Rigoletto, I due Foscari and Otello, Giacomo Puccini's La bohème and Madama Butterfly, Richard Strauss' Daphne and Der Rosenkavalier, Jacques Offenbach's Les Contes d'Hoffmann plus several of his operettas, Franz Lehár's The Merry Widow, Engelbert Humperdinck's Hansel and Gretel, Igor Stravinsky's Oedipus Rex and Ruggero Leoncavallo's Edipo re. At Zurich he conducted Verdi's Falstaff and Bedřich Smetana's The Bartered Bride for the first time.

== Mature career ==
During his freelance career, Kleiber restricted his conducting appearances to select occasions. He made his British debut in 1966 with a performance at the Edinburgh Festival of Alban Berg's Wozzeck, a work whose premiere his father had conducted in 1925. Kleiber's repertoire at the Royal Opera House included Der Rosenkavalier, Elektra, La bohème and Otello. He made his Bayreuth debut in 1974 conducting Richard Wagner's Tristan und Isolde.

His American debut came in 1978 with the Chicago Symphony Orchestra, where he again conducted in 1983, his only US orchestra appearances. His Metropolitan Opera debut was in 1988, conducting La bohème with Luciano Pavarotti and Mirella Freni. In 1989, following Herbert von Karajan's resignation from the Berlin Philharmonic, Kleiber was offered, but declined, the opportunity to succeed him as music director. He returned to the Met in 1989 to conduct La traviata, and in 1990 for Otello and Der Rosenkavalier.

Kleiber kept out of the public eye and apparently gave one interview in his lifetime, contrary to reports that he never gave any. After he resigned from the Bavarian State Opera, his appearances became less frequent and he made only a few recordings.

Most of these studio recordings are highly regarded; they include Ludwig van Beethoven's fifth and seventh symphonies with the Vienna Philharmonic, Johannes Brahms's Symphony No. 4 and Franz Schubert's third and eighth ("Unfinished") symphonies, also with the Vienna Philharmonic, recordings of Dvořák's Concerto for piano and orchestra with Sviatoslav Richter, Carl Maria von Weber's Der Freischütz, Johann Strauss' Die Fledermaus and Giuseppe Verdi's La traviata. His last studio recording was Richard Wagner's Tristan und Isolde with the Staatskapelle Dresden. Recording sessions began in 1980. Kleiber left before they were completed, but since a musically complete performance had been set down, Deutsche Grammophon released it, much to Kleiber's anger.

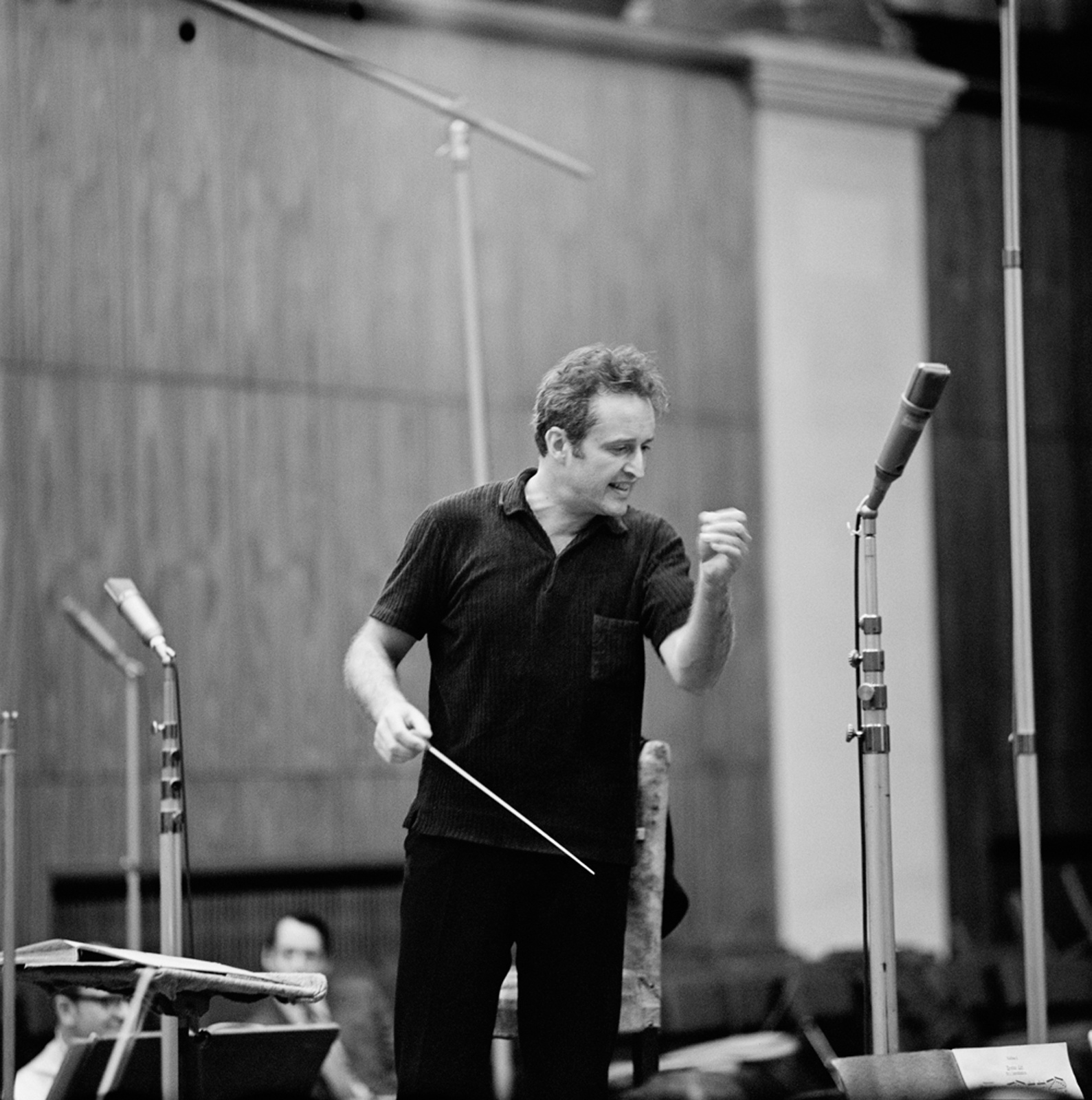
Kleiber in 1973, conducting Staatskapelle Dresden for a recording

Kleiber's small studio discography has been increased by a number of releases of live recordings, often sourced from broadcast relays. These have included his two Vienna New Year's Concerts, performances of Beethoven's Fourth and Seventh Symphonies with the Concertgebouw Orchestra and the Sixth with the Bavarian State Orchestra. The Sixth is especially notable as the only occasion on which Kleiber conducted the work; in this instance the source came not from a radio broadcast but a C-90 compact cassette recorded for his son.

== Later years ==
Kleiber retired from concert life in the early 1990s, occasionally reappearing for private or benefit concerts. For one such event in Ingolstadt, part of his payment consisted of a new Audi made to his specifications. His performances were painstakingly rehearsed, but often seemed spontaneous and inspired. In the opinion of many of his colleagues and audiences, he was an eccentric genius whom some placed among the greatest conductors of all time despite the paucity of his appearances.

He was buried in the Slovenian village of Konjšica near Litija, where he died in 2004, next to his wife Stanislava Brezovar, a ballet dancer, who had died seven months earlier. They had two children, a son Marko and a daughter Lillian.

== Preserved performances ==
Kleiber's unique conducting style is preserved on video in a number of performances: Beethoven's Symphony No. 4 and Symphony No. 7 from the Concertgebouw in Amsterdam, Johann Strauss's Die Fledermaus from Munich, Richard Strauss's Der Rosenkavalier from both Munich and Vienna, Wolfgang Amadeus Mozart's 36th symphony and Brahms's second symphony from the Musikverein in Vienna; Beethoven's Coriolan Overture, Mozart's 33rd and Brahms' fourth symphonies from Munich and Bizet's Carmen again from Vienna. He conducted the New Year's Concert of the Vienna Philharmonic in 1989 and 1992, which are both preserved on video.

== Legacy ==
=== Documentary tributes ===
In 2008 Rai Radio 3 (Italian National Radio channel 3), inside its evening program Radio3 Suite, broadcast a 10-episode program dedicated to Kleiber's legacy: Il Sorriso della Musica: un Ritratto di Carlos Kleiber ("The Smile of Music: A Portrait of Carlos Kleiber"), organized and hosted by Andrea Ottonello, with participation by Claudio Abbado, Mirella Freni, Maurizio Pollini, and above all Carlos Kleiber's sister, Veronica. In his interview, Abbado termed Kleiber "one of the greatest, if not the greatest, conductors of the 20th century" ("Carlos è stato uno dei più grandi, se non il più grande, direttore del Novecento").

On 26 September 2009, BBC Radio 3 transmitted a documentary, Who Was Carlos Kleiber?. Produced by Paul Frankl and presented by Ivan Hewett with research by Ruth Thomson, this feature was based on interviews with four who knew Kleiber well: tenor and conductor Plácido Domingo, music administrator and intendant Sir Peter Jonas, music journalist and critic Christine Lemke-Matvey and conductor–pianist Charles Barber.

His gifts—musical and dramatic insights, analytical abilities, technique, methods of explaining himself—make him the greatest conductor of our day. When I work with him, I feel that he knows why the composer wrote every note, treated every phrase, conceived of every bit of orchestral color in a particular way...If he were to become the permanent conductor of a major orchestra, he could turn it into the greatest ensemble in history.

— Plácido Domingo about his friend and colleague Carlos Kleiber, 1983

Beginning in July 2014, upon the tenth anniversary of his death, a syndicate of public broadcasters in Canada, Great Britain and the United States aired a two-hour documentary, Carlos Kleiber: A Conductor Unlike Any Other, about Kleiber as remembered by his colleagues. Producer Jon Tolansky, who himself played for Kleiber at the Royal Opera House Covent Garden, interviewed singers Ileana Cotrubaș, Thomas Hampson, Dame Felicity Lott, the late Dame Margaret Price and Jonathan Summers, members of the Chicago Symphony, Royal Opera House, London Symphony and Vienna Philharmonic orchestras, conductor and Kleiber friend Charles Barber, administrators Sir Peter Jonas and Sir John Tooley, and recording executive Costa Pilavachi. This audio essay incorporated numerous excerpts from Kleiber's most important recordings, including Beethoven's fifth and seventh symphonies, Verdi's La traviata, Richard Strauss' Der Rosenkavalier, and Weber's Der Freischütz.

=== Honors and posthumous evaluation ===
On 21 June 2010, the city of Ljubljana celebrated Carlos Kleiber's 80th birthday with a concert by the Vienna Philharmonic directed by Kleiber's friend Riccardo Muti. BBC Music Magazine announced on 17 March 2011 that Kleiber had been selected as "the greatest conductor of all time." Some 100 current conductors, including Sir Colin Davis, Gustavo Dudamel, Valery Gergiev and Mariss Jansons, participated in the BBC poll. Kleiber, who conducted just 96 concerts and around 400 operatic performances in his 74 years, was voted ahead of Leonard Bernstein and Claudio Abbado, who took second and third places respectively.

Susanna Mälkki, music director, ensemble intercontemporain, and one of the conductors polled, commented: "Carlos Kleiber brought an incredible energy to music... Yes, he did have about five times as much time to rehearse than conductors do today, but he deserved it because his vision was remarkable, he knew what he wanted, and his attention to detail was truly inspiring."

Jeremy Pound, Deputy Editor of BBC Music Magazine, added: "Asking 100 of today's conducting greats to name their idols and inspirations was a fascinating experience. Not least when so many named Carlos Kleiber, who in the course of his whole lifetime conducted fewer concerts than most of them direct in just a couple of years. Kleiber's incredible attention to detail, sheer enthusiasm for music, and astonishingly accomplished level of performance could never be doubted – perhaps 'less is more' is the real path to true greatness?"

According to Charles Barber, biographer, friend and pen-pal of Kleiber, another factor contributed to his legendary and unusual career. "Uniquely, Carlos Kleiber combined the rigors of German analysis, form and discipline with the expressive vitality of Latin dance, pulse and joy. For nearly twenty years at the formative outset, a conductor baptized Karl gradually became Carlos. He never turned his back on that fascinating cultural biochemistry. It would shape everything he did."

Kleiber was voted into the Gramophone Hall of Fame in 2012. Clemens Hellsberg (Gramophone, May 2012) said:

What was it that propelled Carlos Kleiber to near mystical heights? It was the unforgettable experience of surpassing one's own boundaries, yet also the utter helplessness when he stormed off in the last minutes of a final rehearsal. This was not pretension but rather the expression of deepest despair, even though the orchestra had performed at the highest level – or perhaps for that very reason. Extreme contradictions characterised his personality: one constantly feared catastrophe, yet he was always available to musicians for private conversations. He had a vast repertoire, yet restricted himself to a very few works. His outbursts of rage could be directed at anyone, yet his interaction with children was characterised by a precious and fragile tenderness. In art there are no upward limits. Yet each generation needs at least one artist who exemplifies this. Kleiber reached to the stars for us; even when he broke down in his efforts, he still proved that they exist.

== Honours and awards ==
- Cultural Honor Prize of the City of Munich (1978)
- Knight Commander's Cross of the Order of Merit of the Federal Republic of Germany (1980)
- Pour le Mérite for Science and Art (Germany, 1990)
- Austrian Decoration for Science and Art (1990)
- Golden Baton of La Scala (Milan, 1995)
- German Record Prize
- Bavarian Order of Merit (1995)
- Bavarian Maximilian Order for Science and Art (1998)

== See also ==
- List of Austrians in music

== Filmography ==
- September 2009 BBC Radio program: Who Was Carlos Kleiber?
- Documentary Spuren ins Nichts – Der Dirigent Carlos Kleiber, Deutschland, Slowenien, Österreich, 2010, 52 Min., director Eric Schulz, Centauri, EuroArts Music International.Servus TV, 2010
- TV documentary I am lost to the World, directed by Georg Wübbolt, BFMI, ZDF, 3sat, C major Ent. March 2011
