= Blaž Arnič =

Slovenian composer

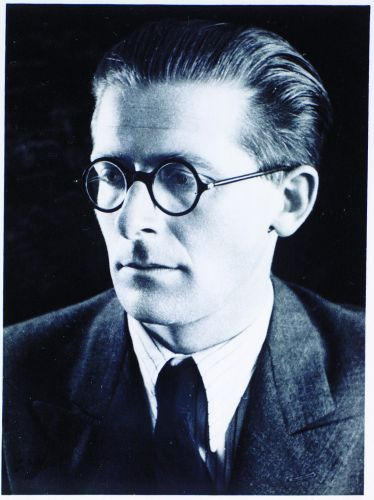
Blaž Arnič in the 1930s

Blaž Arnič (31 January 1901 – 1 February 1970) was a Slovenian symphonic composer.

Born in Luče, Lower Styria, Austria-Hungary, Arnič grew up on an isolated farmstead near Mount Raduha in the Kamnik Alps. He taught himself how to play the accordion, and at the age of nineteen moved to Ljubljana to study music.

== Life ==
Arnič studied composing at the Ljubljana Conservatory, and later (1930-1932) at the New Vienna Conservatory, under the tutelage of Professor Rudolf Nilius, with advanced composition in Warsaw, Kraków and Paris (1938-1939). He taught music at Bol on the island of Brač, Croatia (1934-1935) and in Ljubljana in Yugoslavia (1940-1943).

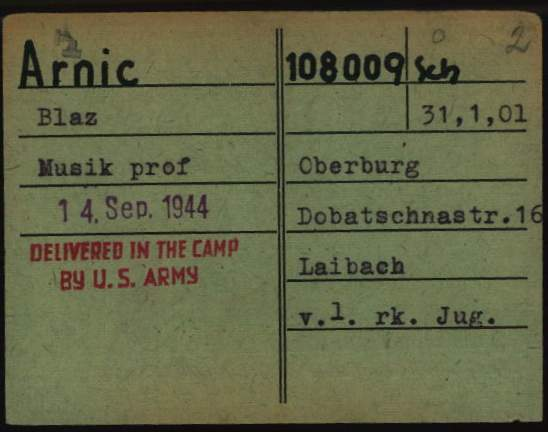
Registration card of Blaž Arnič as a prisoner at Dachau Nazi Concentration Camp

Arnič joined the Communist Party in 1941 and started collaborating with the Liberation Front. In 1943 Arnič was arrested for his political views, and in 1944 he was sent to the Dachau concentration camp, where he became seriously ill (eventually causing him to go blind in one eye). After World War II, he was appointed full professor of composing at the Academy of Music in Ljubljana, where he taught until his death in a car crash. He fell out of favor with the Communist Party after the war (and was expelled from the party in 1949), but his illness prevented him from being prosecuted in the show trials connected with the Informbiro period and in the Dachau trials.

Arnič wrote choral pieces, lieder, piano and chamber pieces and even film music, but he is particularly well known for his nine symphonies. The Society of Slovene Composers considers him one of the great Slovenian symphonic masters of the 20th century, "whose musical language is deeply connected to the spirit of the native soil." His music has been compared to that of Bruckner and classified as "neo-romantic realism." Arnič developed from a neo-romantic base, but avoided the dissonance of the Expressionists.

The first film for which Arnič wrote music was Partizanske bolnice v Sloveniji in 1948, a documentary about a partisan infirmary. In 1955, Milan Kumar of Triglav Film made a 452-minute film entitled Ples čarovnic starring ballerina Stanislava Brezovar which featured Arnič's symphonic poem by the same name.

In 2001, Slovenia issued a postage stamp in his honor.

== Principal works ==
- Piano Trio (1929)
- Overture to a Comic Opera for symphony orchestra (1932)
- Symphony No. 3 – DUMA for orchestra, bass and mixed choir (1933)
- Symphony No. 5 – PARTIKULARNA (1941)
- Symphony No. 6 – SAMORASTNIK for symphony orchestra (1950)
- Ples čarovnic (The Dance of the Witches), symphonic poem (1936)
- Pesem planin (Song of the Highlands), symphonic poem (1940)
- Gozdovi pojejo (The Forests Sing), symphonic poem (1945)
- Divja jaga (Wild Chase), symphonic poem (1958–1965)
- Pastoral Symphonic Poem for violoncello and orchestra (1960)
- Concerto for viola and orchestra, Op.75 (1967)
- Concerto for violin and orchestra No. 3 (1969)
