= Teresa Cahill =

English soprano (born 1944)

- Born: Teresa Mary Cahill; 30 July 1944 (age 82); Maidenhead, Berkshire, England
- Occupation: Opera singer

Teresa Cahill (born 30 June 1944) is an English soprano from South London. She is particularly known for performing the works of Richard Strauss and Sir Edward Elgar, as well as for her performance of Gustav Mahler's Symphony No. 8.

== Early life ==
Cahill was born in Berkshire, England, and raised in South London. Her mother was a factory worker in London, and her father, a stevedore, died when she was five years old. After spending two years in a sanatorium due to a diagnosis of tuberculosis, she was formally trained in the piano, and eventually earned a scholarship to the Guildhall School of Music and Drama.

== Career ==
Her opera career began at Glyndebourne with the song First Lady in Die Zauberflöte and then Alice Ford in Falstaff. Cahill has performed over 100 songs at Covent Garden Opera House which include Der Rosenkavalier (Sophie) with Carlos Kleiber, Don Giovanni (Zerline and Elvira) and La Clemenza di Tito (Servilia), which she also sang at La Scala, Milan.

Having received the Peter Stuyvesant scholarship to the London Opera Centre at the age of twenty, she debuted in The Marriage of Figaro, conducted by Otto Klemperer. Over the course of her career, she performed over one hundred operas at Covent Garden, including , Boris Godunov, and the premiering performance of We Come to the River by Hans Werner Henze.

Her concerts include Symphony no. 8 by Mahler with the Chicago Symphony Orchestra and Georg Solti, with Michael Gielen at the Vienna Festival, then with Riccardo Chailly in the 1987 Berlin Festival open; Beethoven's Missa Solemnis with Colin Davis and the Boston Symphony Orchestra; and Shostakovich's Symphony no.14 with Dietrich Fischer-Dieskau and the WDR Cologne Orchestra under Gary Bertini.

She also sang Vienna Webern cantatas at the Vienna Symphony Orchestra Mahler's Second Symphony with Gennadi Rozhdestvensky, Mahler's Fourth with Klaus Tennstedt, Mahler's Eighth with Eliahu Inbal and Henze's Elegy for Young Lovers in Frankfurt, London and Gutersloh as part of the composer's 60th birthday celebrations. Teresa also performed in Texas at Michael Tippett's 80th birthday concert performance of A Child of our Time in Houston, and she also performed Tippett's Third Symphony.

== Awards and recognition ==
In 2017, Teresa Cahill was awarded the Elgar Medal and the Sir Charles Santley Gift, both of which are considered lifetime achievement awards.

== See also ==
- NMC Recordings
