= Stanislava Brezovar =

Slovenian ballet dancer (1937–2003)

Stanislava Brezovar, ballerina

Stanislava Brezovar (7 November 1937 – 18 December 2003), married name Kleiber, was a Slovenian ballerina. She was also known as Stanka Brezovar.

Born in Zagorje ob Savi, Slovenia, she studied to be a Germanist, but her primary love was ballet. She studied ballet in Düsseldorf. It was there that she met and married the German-born Austrian conductor Carlos Kleiber.

In 1955, at the age of 18, she starred in the movie Ples čarovnic (Dance of The Witches), a Triglav Film production in Slovenian. The movie was a tour-de-force, 452 minutes of ballet to the Ples čarovnic symphonic poem by Blaž Arnič with choreography by Pia and Pino Mlakar.

Brezovar is buried together with Carlos Kleiber in the Slovenian village of Konjšica near Litija.
