= Konjšica =

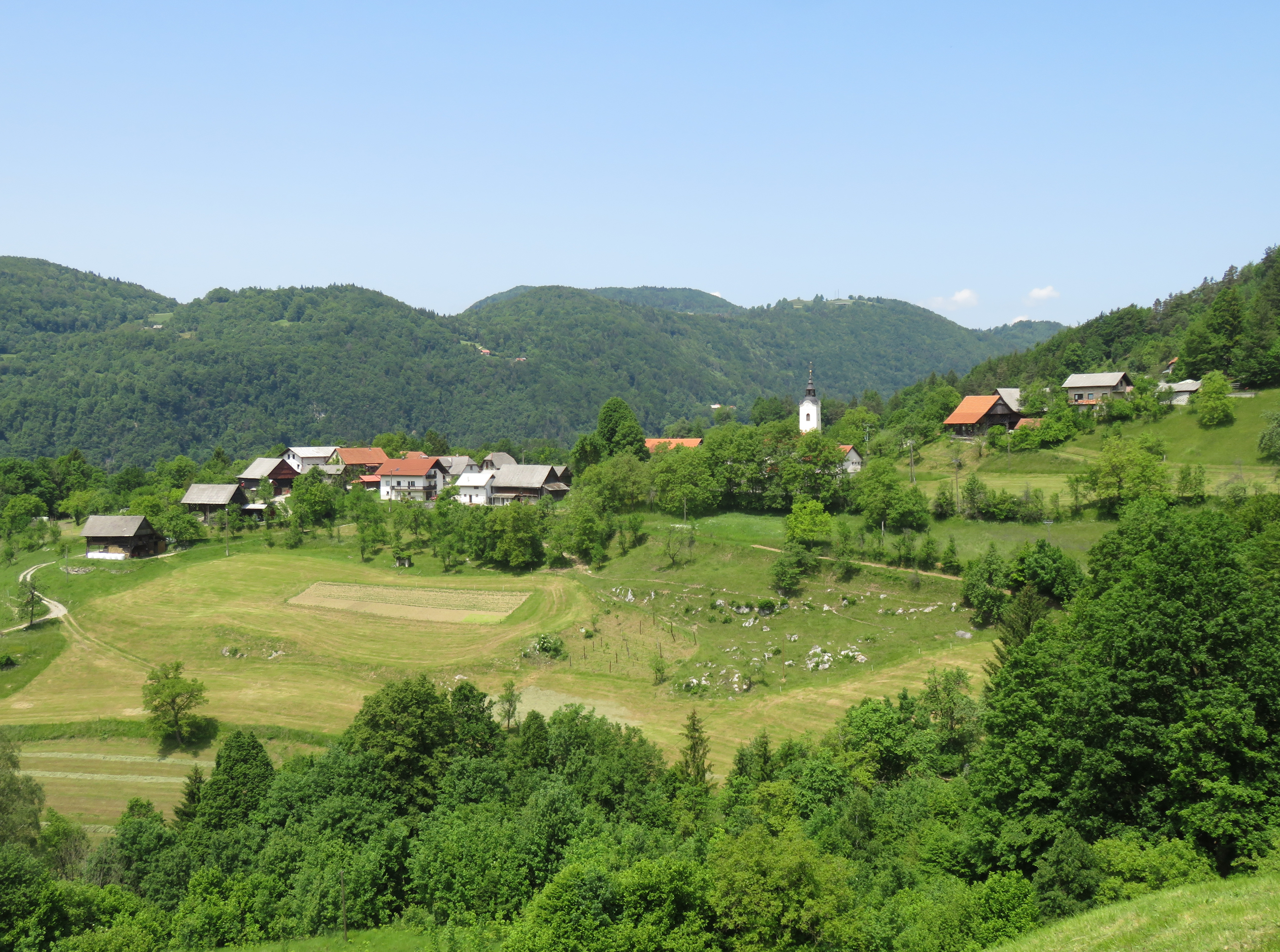

- Location in Slovenia
- Coordinates: 46°5′50.45″N 14°58′18.96″E
- Country: Slovenia
- Traditional region: Lower Carniola
- Statistical region: Central Sava
- Municipality: Litija, Zagorje ob Savi

Area
  - Total: 7.29 km^{2} (2.81 sq mi)
- Elevation: 490 m (1,610 ft)

Population (2002)
  - Total: 143
- Postal code: 1272

Konjšica (pronounced [ˈkoːnʃitsa]; in older sources also Košica, German: Koschza) is a settlement in the hills on the right bank of the Sava River in the Municipality of Litija in central Slovenia. A small part of the settlement also lies in the Municipality of Zagorje ob Savi. The area is part of the traditional region of Lower Carniola. It is now included with the rest of the municipality in the Central Sava Statistical Region; until January 2014 the municipality was part of the Central Slovenia Statistical Region.

== Church ==
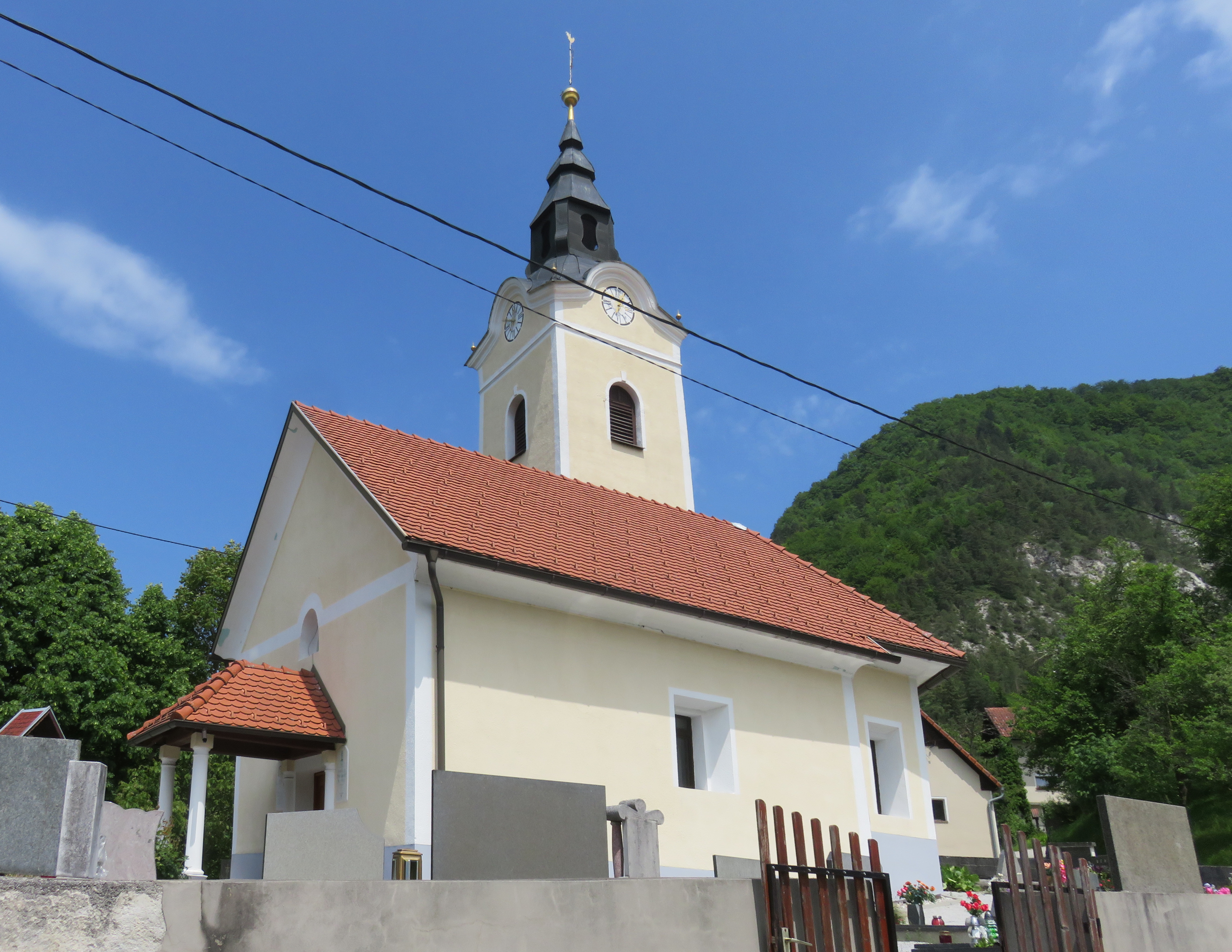
Saint Bartholomew's Church

The local church is dedicated to Saint Bartholomew (Slovene: sveti Jernej) and belongs to the Parish of Podkum. It dates to 1780.

== Notable people ==
The conductor Carlos Kleiber and his wife Stanislava Brezovar are buried at the local cemetery.
