= Barry McCauley =

American opera singer

Barry McCauley (June 25, 1950 – October 10, 2001) was an American operatic tenor. He sang leading roles with major opera companies throughout the world, including the Metropolitan Opera and the Paris Opera.

McCauley was born in Altoona, Pennsylvania. He received his BA from Eastern Kentucky University, his MA from Arizona State University. He was a member of the San Francisco Opera Merola Program for two summers, and made his professional debut as Don José with the San Francisco Spring Opera in 1977. The following year he sang the title role in Faust with the San Francisco Opera. Other roles in San Francisco included Edgardo in Lucia di Lammermoor, Ruggero in La Rondine and Pierre in Prokofiev’s War and Peace, conducted by Valery Gerghiev.

His New York City Opera debut came in 1980 with the title role in Gounod’s Faust. Additional roles with the company included Rodolfo in La Bohème, Alfredo in La Traviata, Roberto Dudley in Maria Stuarda, Nadir in Les Pêcheurs de Perles, Pinkerton in Madama Butterfly, Ruggero in La Rondine and Gerald in Lakmé. His performance of Edgardo in Lucia di Lammermoor was telecast nationwide on “Live From Lincoln Center” during the 1981-82 season.

He made his Metropolitan Opera debut in 1986 as Jaquino in Fidelio. He also sang the painter in Lulu, and Cassio in Otello in a gala performance conducted by Carlos Kleiber.

His Santa Fe Opera debut was as Wilhelm in Mignon opposite Frederica von Stade. His Lyric Opera of Chicago debut was as Gerald in Lakmé He returned there as Ruggerio in La Rondine with Ileana Cotrubas, and as Loge in Das Rheingold, conducted by Zubin Mehta.

McCauley also had a major European career. For the Opéra de Paris he sang Boris in Katya Kabanova, Belmonte in Die Entführung aus dem Serail, Lensky in Eugene Onegin, Admete in Alceste, and des Grieux in Manon. At the Netherlands Opera he debuted in La Damnation de Faust, later returning to sing the title role in Parsifal and Hegenback in Catalani’s La Wally.

Other important European appearances included Salzburg Festival performances such as Filka Morosov/Luka Kuzmic in From the House of the Dead, conducted by Claudio Abbado, and as Aegisth in Elektra (a role he repeated in concert with the Berlin Philharmonic); a portrayal of Alwa in Köln Opera’s production of Lulu; Andres and the Drum Major in Wozzeck, both at the Teatro la Fenice in Venice; Gregor in The Makropoulos Affair at the Teatro Communale in Bologna; Don Ottavio in Don Giovanni for his debut at Aix-en-Provence; Boris in Katya Kabanova and Don José in Carmen at the Glyndebourne Festival; Idamante in Idomeneo and Belfiore in La finta giardiniera in Brussels; Wilhelm Meister for the Maggio Musicale in Florence; and Hoffmann for the Grand Théâtre de Genève.

He was the recipient of the prestigious Richard Tucker Award in 1980.

His singing career was cut short due to lung cancer, of which he ultimately died, in Oradell, New Jersey.
