= Wolfgang Brendel =

German opera singer (born 1947)

Wolfgang Brendel (born 20 October 1947, in Munich) is a German opera singer (baritone), and a professor of voice at the Jacobs School of Music at Indiana University. He has performed throughout Europe, Asia, and North America.

== Biography ==
Wolfgang Brendel grew up in Wiesbaden, where he took singing lessons with Rolff Sartorius during his time at the conservatory. In 1971, he debuted at the Pfalztheater in Kaiserslautern as Guglielmo in Così fan tutte. His artistic home for the greater part of his career was the Bayerische Staatsoper in Munich, where in 1977 he became the youngest Kammersänger in the company's history.

In some sense taking up the mantle of Josef Metternich, who had retired in 1971, Brendel established his primacy as the star Munich baritone of his era across an extraordinary range of roles, from Mozart (not only Guglielmo but Count Almaviva in Le nozze di Figaro, Papageno in Die Zauberflöte, the title role in Don Giovanni) to Verdi (Germont in La traviata, Posa in Don Carlo, Renato in Un ballo in maschera, Carlo in La forza del destino, and di Luna in Il trovatore) and beyond. Already in 1973, he achieved acclaim as Pelléas in a new production by Jean-Pierre Ponnelle of Debussy's Pelléas et Mélisande. Sabine Tomzig wrote in the Hamburger Abendblatt: "A discovery: the 25-year-old Munich baritone as Pelleas, a Gallic figure with that lightness and brightness of timbre that predestines him for a part that is usually sung by tenors" ("Eine Entdeckung: der 25jährige Münchener Bariton Wolfgang Brendel als Pelleas, ein romanischer Typ mit jener Leichtigkeit und Helligkeit des Timbres, das ihn für diese meist von Tenören gesungene Partie prädestiniert"). Early on the conductor Carlos Kleiber selected him to sing Germont, conducting him also in other roles (for example, Falke in Die Fledermaus; in later years, Brendel would graduate to Eisenstein). In these early years he also sang a variety of other roles, including Silvio in Pagliacci.

Brendel began his Wagner career with Wolfram von Eschenbach in Tannhäuser. Over the years he would take on heavier Wagner roles (Amfortas in Parsifal, Holländer in Der fliegende Holländer), eventually singing Hans Sachs in Die Meistersinger von Nürnberg and adding Kurwenal in Tristan und Isolde to his repertoire in 2005. Other Verdi baritone roles included Ford in Falstaff, Miller in Luisa Miller, and the title roles in Simon Boccanegra, Nabucco and Macbeth. He performed the title role in Tchaikovsky's Eugene Onegin frequently but became perhaps most closely associated with a series of baritone roles in Richard Strauss operas—Mandryka in Arabella and Barak in Die Frau ohne Schatten – that were particularly well-suited to him. (He has also performed the Music Master in Ariadne auf Naxos, Orest in Elektra, the Count in Capriccio, and Altair in Die ägyptische Helena). He has also sung Puccini: Marcello in La bohème, Sharpless in Madama Butterfly, Rance in La fanciulla del West, and, most recently, Scarpia in Tosca.

Brendel has performed on all the major opera stages in Germany (Hamburg State Opera, both the Deutsche Oper and the Staatsoper in Berlin, Dresden) and throughout Europe (Vienna, Milan, London, Paris, Bayreuth, Dresden, Amsterdam, Lisbon, Madrid), in Tokyo, and in the United States (New York, Chicago, San Francisco, Los Angeles, Dallas). Since Brendel's debut at the Metropolitan Opera in 1975, age 27, as Count Almaviva, he has sung 91 performances there through 2007 in Mozart (Papageno), Verdi (Germont, Miller), Wagner (Amfortas), Puccini (Sharpless), J. Strauß (Dr. Falke and Eisenstein), and R. Strauss (Mandryka, Barak, Count in Capriccio, Music Master, Altair). In his Andante on-line review of Brendel's Barak in the new production of Die Frau ohne Schatten in 2001, Paul Griffiths catches the essence of the baritone in so many of his roles: "Wolfgang Brendel is extraordinarily resourceful. With his subtle control of color and phrasing, he can suggest a man fiercely resolute, tired or ironically self-dismissive, yet always good and trustworthy. He sings with melodious ease: the entire part comes across as the man's natural mode of expression."

Brendel, for many years a professor of voice at the Munich Hochschule für Musik und Theater, as of fall, 2011, is Professor of Practice at the Jacobs School of Music, Indiana University, Bloomington, Indiana. In 1997 he was awarded the Cross of the Order of Merit of the Federal Republic of Germany. His most recent appearances have been as Scarpia, Mandryka, Sachs, Eisenstein, and Holländer.

== Recordings ==
While most of the studio recordings Brendel made are not currently available (e.g., I pagliacci, a German-language La bohème), a few are: Die Fledermaus (Previn, 1999), in which he is the Eisenstein, Schumann's Das Paradies und die Peri (Giulini, 1974), Brahms’ Deutsches Requiem (Sinopoli), highlights of Die Zauberflöte (Haitink; the complete recording is out of print), and two discs of arias (Orfeo).

A good number of his live performances are documented on DVD and CD. He can be seen as the High Priest in Samson et Dalila (San Francisco, 1981), Papageno (Munich, 1983), Eugene Onegin (Chicago, 1985), Dr. Falke (Munich, 1987), Wolfram (Bayreuth, 1989), Sachs (Deutsche Oper Berlin, 1995), Mandryka (MET, 1995), and the Music Master in "Ariadne auf Naxos" (MET, 2003); there are also DVDs of his Posa (Barcelona, 1985) and Germont (Madrid, 1990) in limited circulation.

He was featured in made-for-televisions films of two J. Strauss operettas: Eine Nacht in Venedig (1975) and Der Zigeunerbaron (1976). CDs in circulation of complete live performances – some quite rare – include: his Germont under Kleiber from at least two different Munich performances (1975 and 1977), a youthful Wolfram (Perugia, 1972) and Guglielmo (Munich, 1978), both under Sawallisch, Posa (Munich, 1977; San Francisco, 1979; Munich, 1983), Count Almaviva (Munich, 1983), Onegin (Vienna, 1988), Enrico (London, 1988), Amfortas (Milan, 1991; New York, 1995), di Luna (Munich, 1992), and Mandryka (Munich, 2001). A CD exists of a Deutsches Requiem with the Bavarian Radio Symphony Orchestra under Kubelik (1978).
