= Neue Pizzicato Polka =

Polka composed by Johann Strauss II

Johann Strauss II's Neue Pizzicato-Polka (English: New Pizzicato Polka), Op. 449, was composed in early 1892 for concerts in Hamburg under Eduard Strauss. It was titled in contradistinction to the old 1869 Pizzicato-Polka jointly composed by Johann Strauss and his brother Josef and in reference to its scoring for string orchestra marked pizzicato throughout. It is in ternary form with an ad libitum glockenspiel solo in the trio. Strauss later used this music for the ballet between the second and third acts of his operetta Fürstin Ninetta.
