= Beethoven: Symphonies Nos. 5 & 7 (Kleiber recording) =

1955 studio album by Carlos Kleiber

Studio album by Carlos Kleiber
- Released: 1975, 1976
- Studios: Musikveriensaal, Vienna
- Genre: Symphony
- Length: 72:08
- Label: Deutsche Grammophon
- Producers: Werner Mayer (no. 5), Dr. Hans Hirsch (no. 7)

Beethoven: Symphonies Nos. 5 & 7 comprises 1975 and 1976 studio recordings of Beethoven's Symphonies no. 5 and 7 with the Vienna Philharmonic under the direction of Carlos Kleiber with the Deutsche Grammophon label. Early critics praised the sense of electricity, freshness and urgency of the Kleiber's reading. The recording, especially the fifth symphony, is considered a classic reference recording, is noted for setting new standards and has been ranked among the greatest classical recordings of all time. In 1995, Deutsche Grammophon rereleased the two symphonies on one disc under The Originals - Legendary Recordings from the Deutsche Grammophon Catalogue series.

== Track listing ==
Symphony No. 5 In C Minor

- 1. Allegro Con Brio 7:22
- 2. Andante Con Moto 10:00
- 3. Allegro 5:09
- 4. Allegro 10:51

Symphony No. 7 In A Minor

- 1. Poco Sostenuto – Vivace 13:36
- 2. Allegretto 8:09
- 3. Presto 8:15
- 4. Allegro Con Brio
