= Gerhard Unger =

German opera singer

Gerhard Unger (26 November 1916 – 4 July 2011) was a German lyric tenor. Born in Bad Salzungen, he studied in Berlin and began singing concerts and oratorios in 1945, once the war was over.

Unger made his debut as an opera singer in 1947 in Weimar. From 1949 to 1961, he sang with the Berlin State Opera. When the Berlin Wall was erected, he left for Stuttgart. After 1951 Unger sang regularly at the Bayreuth Festival. One of his signature roles was David from Die Meistersinger von Nürnberg, which is documented on several recordings, including with Herbert von Karajan (1951), Rudolf Kempe (1951 and 1956), Hans Knappertsbusch (1952), Hans Rosbaud (1955), and Rafael Kubelík (1968), as well as a DVD of a 1970 performance conducted by Leopold Ludwig. Equally known was his Pedrillo in Mozart's Die Entführung aus dem Serail, notably in the 1965 Salzburg Festival production staged by Giorgio Strehler and designed by Luciano Damiani, which was conducted by Zubin Mehta, and was kept in the festival's repertory for 10 years and was also shown at Milan's La Scala. Unger's other Salzburg Festival roles included Monostatos in two different stagings of The Magic Flute (1967, 1968 and 1970, staged by Oscar Fritz Schuh and conducted by Wolfgang Sawallisch; 1974 staged by Strehler and conducted by Karajan, and Valzacchi in Richard Strauss' Der Rosenkavalier (1969, staged by Rudolf Hartmann, designed by Teo Otto, and conducted by Karl Böhm). He occasionally played Mime, for example in La Scala's 1975 production staged by Luca Ronconi, designed by Pier Luigi Pizzi, and conducted by Sawallisch.

His other commercial recordings include the Otto Klemperer recording of The Magic Flute (1963), as Monastatos, and the Georg Solti Decca recording of Elektra.
