= Catarina Ligendza =

Swedish soprano opera singer (born 1937)

Catarina Ligendza (born 18 October 1937) is a Swedish soprano opera singer.

Originally Katarina Beyron, she was born in Stockholm, the daughter of the soprano Brita Hertzberg and the tenor Einar Beyron. She studied at the University of Music and Performing Arts, Vienna, then from 1959 to 1963, at the Hochschule für Musik Würzburg, and finally with Josef Greindl at the Hochschule für Musik Saar.

In 1965 she made her debut as the Countess in Mozart's Le nozze di Figaro in Linz. Afterwards she sang in Braunschweig and Saarbrücken and then at the Deutsche Oper Berlin in 1969, engagements followed in Stuttgart and Hamburg and in 1971 she took the role of Leonore in Fidelio at the Metropolitan Opera, New York City.

As a dramatic soprano, she was prominent in the Wagner repertoire and appeared at the Bayreuth Festival from 1971-1977 and in 1986 and 1987 as Isolde and as Elsa in 1987. Probably the best known of her recordings is the Meistersinger production of 1976 for Deutsche Grammophon, conducted by Eugen Jochum, in which she sings the role of Eva. She also sang at La Scala, the Royal Opera House in London, in Munich and Vienna. She retired in 1988.
