= Luigi Roni =

Italian singer (1942–2020)

- Born: 22 February 1942; Vergemoli, Italy
- Died: 26 March 2020 (aged 78); Lucca, Italy
- Occupation: Singer

Bass Luigi Roni (22 February 1942 – 26 March 2020) was an Italian opera singer.

== Biography ==
Roni studied singing in Lucca alongside Adriana Pizzorusso. He made his singing debut at age 22 at the Spoleto Festival USA with the opera Faust, in which he played Mephistopheles. His singing partners included Montserrat Caballé, Luciano Pavarotti, Plácido Domingo, and José Carreras. He sang at multiple opera halls, including La Scala, the Vienna State Opera, and the Metropolitan Opera House. In France, he performed alongside other opera singers at the Chorégies d'Orange and at the Paris Opera. In 2004, Roni founded the Il Serchio delle muse summer opera festival, held in the Serchio valley.

Roni's final role was in April 2019, when he played Simone in Gianni Schicchi at the Teatro Carlo Felice in Genoa. Roni died in Lucca on 26 March 2020, at the age of 78 due to COVID-19.

== Operas ==
- The Barber of Seville (1973)
- Zaira (1976)
- Otello (1976)
- Aida (1977)
- Don Carlos (1978)
- I Lombardi alla prima crociata (1984)
- Don Carlos (1984)
- I due Foscari (1988)
- William Tell (1988)
- La fanciulla del West (1991)
- Fedora (1993)
- Manon Lescaut (1998)
- Falstaff (2001)
- La traviata (2005)
- Falstaff (2006)
- La traviata (2007)
- La traviata (2012)
