= Ruža Pospiš-Baldani =

Croatian operatic mezzo-soprano (born 1942)

Ruža Pospiš-Baldani (Croatian pronunciation: [rǔːʒa pɔ̂spiːʃ baldǎni]; born 25 July 1942) is a Croatian operatic mezzo-soprano.

Baldani was born in Varaždinske Toplice and made her professional opera debut in 1961 at the Croatian National Theatre in Zagreb as Konchakovna in Alexander Borodin's Prince Igor. She remained active at that theatre and at the National Theatre in Belgrade throughout the 1960s. In 1965 she made her debut at the Metropolitan Opera in New York City as Maddalena in Giuseppe Verdi's Rigoletto. From 1970 to 1978 she was committed to the Bavarian State Opera. Between 1973 and 1987 she was a frequent guest artist at the Vienna State Opera; drawing particular acclaim there as Brangäne in Richard Wagner's Tristan und Isolde. In 1976 she made her debut at the Paris Opera as Amneris in Verdi's Aida, and made her first appearance at the Opéra de Monte-Carlo in the title role of Georges Bizet's Carmen. She has since appeared as a guest artist at the Cologne Opera. the Edinburgh Festival, the Greek National Opera, the Hamburg State Opera, the Houston Grand Opera, the Hungarian State Opera House, La Scala, the Liceu, the Lyric Opera of Chicago, the National Opera of Sofia, the Salzburg Festival, the San Francisco Opera, the Savonlinna Opera Festival, the Teatro dell'Opera di Roma, the Teatro di San Carlo, and the Teatro Municipal in Rio de Janeiro among others.
