= Helena Jungwirth =

Swedish opera singer (1945–2023)

- Helena Jungwirth, in the 1960s
- Born: 21 March 1945; Stockholm, Sweden
- Died: 27 January 2023 (aged 77); Planegg, Bavaria, Germany
- Occupation: Operatic mezzo-soprano
- Title: Kammersängerin
- Spouse: Claes-Håkan Ahnsjö
- Children: 3

Helena Jungwirth (21 March 1945 — 27 January 2023) was a Swedish mezzo-soprano opera singer. While training at the Music and Drama School in Stockholm, in 1969 she married the tenor Claes-Håkan Ahnsjö. In 1972, she made her debut at the Drottningholm Palace Theatre as Dorabella in Mozart's Così fan tutte. The following year, together with her husband she was engaged by the Bavarian State Opera in Munich where she went on to perform with success in a wide repertoire. In 1987, at the Berlin State Opera she sang the title role in Rossini's La Cenerentola. She was honoured with the title of Bavarian Kammersängerin in 1996.

== Life and career ==
Born in Stockholm on 21 March 1945, Jungwirth studied opera at Stockholm's Music and Drama School (Statens musikdramatiska skola) from 1969 to 1972. In 1969, she married the successful Swedish tenor Claes-Håkon Ahnsjö.

Jungwirth made her debut in 1972 at the Drottningholm Palace Theatre as Dorabella in Mozart's Così fan tutte in a production directed by Götz Friedrich, alongside her husband as Ferrando. From 1972 to 1973, she performed at the Royal Swedish Opera where she sang the title role in the premiere of Lars Johan Werle's opera Tintomara which was presented in connection with the company's 200th anniversary in 1973.

In 1973, as a result of her husband's engagement at the Bavarian State Opera in Munich, she also joined the company where she enjoyed considerable success. The couple performed the company's wide repertory for many years. Jungwirth's roles included Marcellina in Mozart's Le nozze di Figaro, Zulma in Rossini's L'italiana in Algeri, Ines in Verdi's Il trovatore and Siegrune in Wagner's Die Walküre. She also appeared as Olga in Tchaikovsky's Eugene Onegin, Siebel in Gounod's Faust, Alisa in Donizetti's Lucia di Lammermoor, and Eurydike in Orff's Antigonae.

Jungwirth performed the role of Cherubino in Le nozze di Figaro at the Glyndebourne Festival in 1974. In 1987, she was a guest performer at the Berlin State Opera in the title role of Rossini's La Cenerentola. She also performed at the Hamburg State Opera, the Bayreuth Festival and at London's Royal Opera House.

Helena Jungwirth died in the Planegg district of Munich on 27 January 2023. She is survived by her husband, her three sons Fredrik, Mattias, Sven, and their families.

== Awards ==
In December 1996, Jungwirth was honoured with the title of Bayerische Kammersängerin. In presenting the award, the Bavarian minister of culture Hans Zehetmair recognized how in more than 1,400 performances over a period of 23 years, Jungwirth had impressed her audiences in her many roles with her stage presence, her dramatic flexibility and her confident vocal delivery.
