= Triglav Film =

Triglav Film is a Slovenian film studio based in Ljubljana. Established in 1947, it is the second studio founded in post-World War II Yugoslavia. It is named after Triglav, the highest mountain in Slovenia, which is also the name of a pagan deity.
