= Symphony No. 33 (Mozart) =

1779 composition by Wolfgang Amadeus Mozart

- by W. A. Mozart
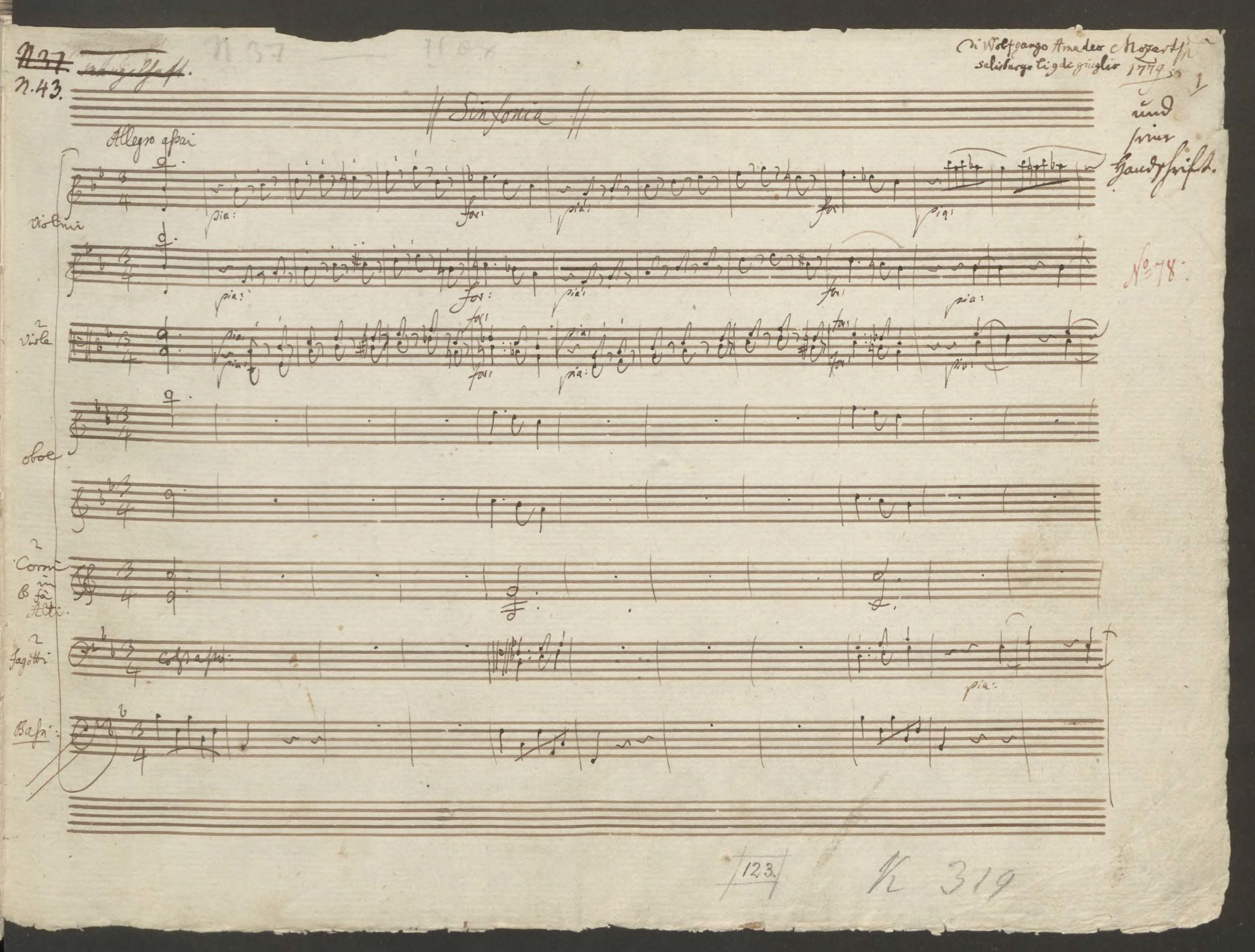
- First page of the autograph manuscript
- Key: B♭ major
- Catalogue: K. 319
- Composed: 1779, revised 1782 or 1785
- Published: 1785, Vienna
- Publisher: Artaria
- Movements: 4
- Scoring: Orchestra

The Symphony No. 33 in B♭ major, K. 319, was written by Wolfgang Amadeus Mozart, and dated on 9 July 1779.

== Structure ==
Symphony No. 33 performed by the New York Classical Players in 2021

The symphony is scored for two oboes, two bassoons, two horns, and strings, the smallest orchestral force employed in his last ten symphonies.

It has four movements:

1. Allegro assai, 3/4, in sonata form
2. Andante moderato in E♭ major, 2/4, in modified sonata form
3. Menuetto, 3/4, in ternary form
4. Finale: Allegro assai, 2/4, in sonata form

The development section of the first movement is based on a theme that does not appear in the exposition: the four-note figure that is the principal theme of the Jupiter Symphony.

The order of the first and second subjects in the second movement are reversed in the recapitulation.

The autograph score is today preserved in the Biblioteka Jagiellońska, in Kraków.
