= Symphony No. 4 (Brahms) =

Symphony by Johannes Brahms

- by Johannes Brahms
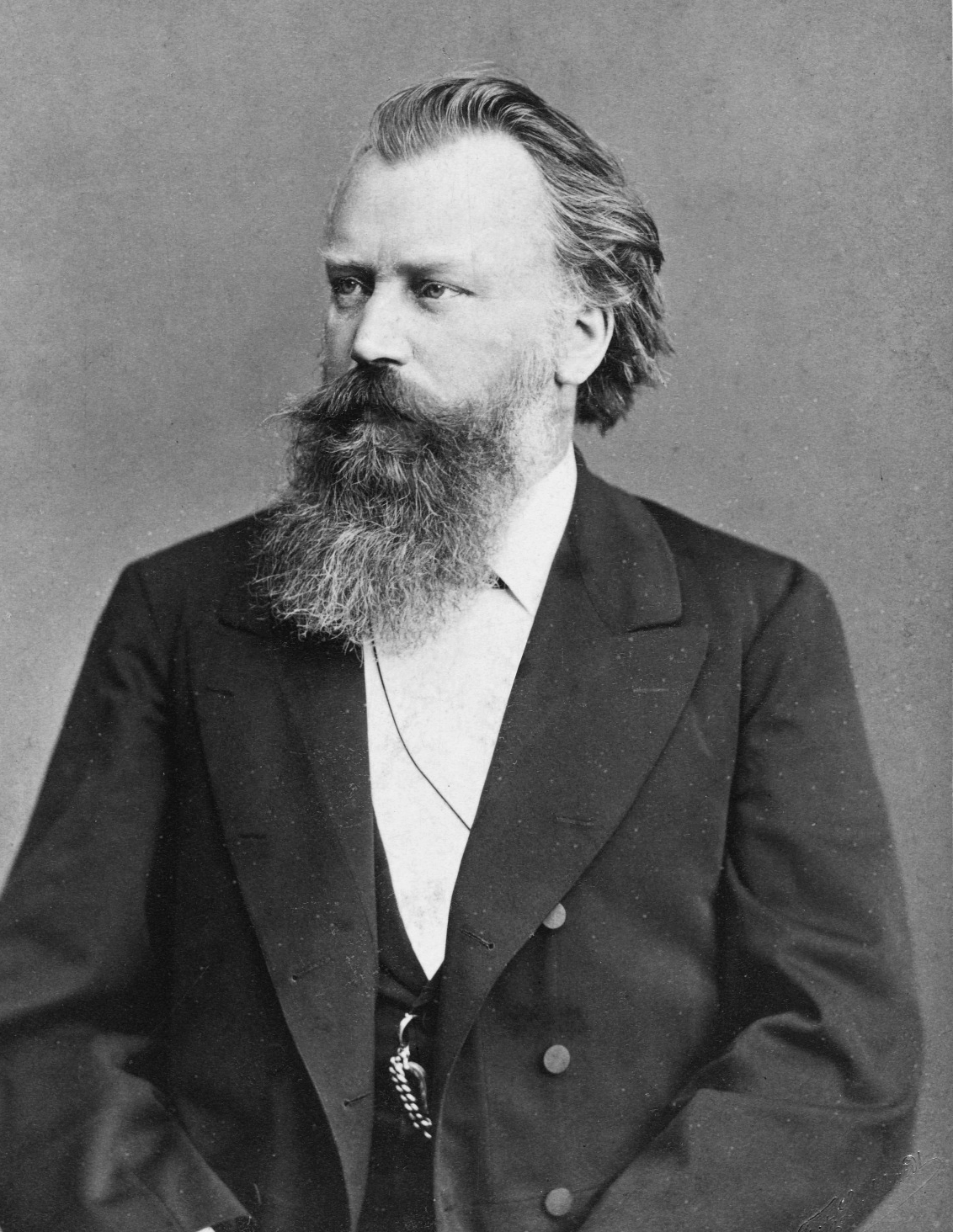
- Brahms in 1885
- Key: E minor
- Opus: 98
- Composed: 1884
- Duration: c. 40 minutes
- Movements: 4
- Scoring: Orchestra

Premiere
- Date: 25 October 1885
- Location: Meiningen, Germany
- Conductor: Johannes Brahms
- Performers: Meiningen Court Orchestra

The Symphony No. 4 in E minor, Op. 98 by Johannes Brahms, is the last of his symphonies. Brahms began working on the piece in Mürzzuschlag, then in the Austro-Hungarian Empire, in 1884, just a year after completing his Symphony No. 3. Brahms conducted the Court Orchestra in Meiningen, Germany, for the work's premiere on 25 October 1885.

== Instrumentation ==
The symphony is scored for two flutes (one doubling on piccolo in the third movement only), two oboes, two clarinets, two bassoons, contrabassoon (third and fourth movements), four horns, two trumpets, three trombones (fourth movement only), timpani (two in first and second movements, three in third and fourth movements), triangle (third movement only), and strings.

== Movements ==
I. Allegro non troppo (12:41)

II. Andante moderato (11:14)

III. Allegro giocoso (6:19)

IV. Allegro energico e passionato (11:08)

The symphony is divided into four movements with the following tempo markings:

1. Allegro non troppo (E minor)
2. Andante moderato (E major)
3. Allegro giocoso (C major)
4. Allegro energico e passionato (E minor)

This is the only one of Brahms' four symphonies to end in a minor key. A typical performance lasts about 40 minutes.

== Analysis ==
=== I. Allegro non troppo ===
This movement is in sonata form, although it features some unique approaches to development. For instance- alone amongst the first movements of his four symphonies- there is no repeat of the exposition; according to Malcolm MacDonald, the music is so "powerfully organic and continuously unfolding" that such a repeat would hinder forward progress.

The opening theme has often been associated with the tenor acclamation “Er kommt, er kommt, der Bräutgam kommt” from Johann Sebastian Bach’s cantata Wachet auf, ruft uns die Stimme, BWV 140. Its melodic construction is based on a chain of descending thirds, transformed at the opening into an expressive rising sixth. The theme’s fragmented, syncopated profile creates an underlying tension which Brahms develops as a fundamental motivic force throughout the movement. Later, the descending thirds emerge more explicitly in the musical foreground. A fateful transformation of this material returns at the climax of the finale, embedded within the chaconne variations.

Bar	Section	Key	Description
1	Primary theme	E minor	Starts with pick-up note. This relatively fragmented melody forms a descending sequence in the upper instruments in dialogue with the lower instruments. The notes (taken out of register) outline a row of descending circle of thirds – B, G, E, C, A, F♯, D♯, B – a unifying motif for this work.
19	Transition modulation to second theme	Goes from E minor to the dominant B minor	Starts by fragmenting the primary theme
53	Transition motif		Transition motif: a rhythmic pattern in the woodwinds
57	Secondary theme period 1	B minor	Initially in the cellos, then passed up into the violins with intermittent play with transition motif.
95	Secondary theme period 2	B major – parallel major of B minor	In the woodwinds.
107	Closing section	B major	Using transition motif pp to ff.
137	Transition modulation to development	Lead from B major into E minor	Using primary theme material
145	Development	Various	Starts with a statement of the primary theme before leading away into a development
247	Recapitulation	E minor -> E major	Slow version of primary theme in the upper instruments (initially in C major harmony) with intermittent use of transition motif followed by lengthy recapitulation of secondary theme block now transposed to the tonic key.
394	Coda	E minor	Final climactic statement of the primary theme in ff.

=== II. Andante moderato ===
Featuring a theme in E Phrygian, heard at the beginning unaccompanied and at the end with a lush orchestral accompaniment in the dominant scale, this movement has a modified sonata form with no development section (akin to binary form), though there is a development-like section in the recapitulation.

Bar	Section	Key	Description
1	Introduction	E Phrygian	Introduction to the principal theme by horns
5	Principal theme	E major	Several statements of the principal theme
36	Transition theme	B major	Dominated by the wind sections
41	Secondary theme	B major	Initially in the cellos, then passed up into the violins
50	Secondary theme cadence and transition theme	B major	Using transition motif pp to ff.
64	Recapitulation	E major	Recapitulation quite similar in structure to the exposition
106	Coda	E Phrygian dominant	Free play of themes with frequent use of arpeggios

=== III. Allegro giocoso ===
This movement is the only one with the character of a scherzo to be found in Brahms' symphonies, as well as the only one with additional percussion alongside the timpani (the triangle). It is not in typical scherzo form, however, being in 2/4 time and in sonata form, without a trio. The sonata form itself is modified further, with a foreshortened recapitulation and with the secondary theme nearly absent in the development and coda.

Bar	Section	Key	Description
1	Primary theme	C major and E♭ major	Primary theme consisting of three different periods (ordered 1–2–3–1)
46	Transition to secondary theme	Transition to G major	Based on the first period of the primary theme
52	Secondary theme	G major	Secondary theme followed by elements of a transition to the development
89	Development	Various keys	Based on the primary theme block with a slow trio-like section based on the second period of the first theme.
181	Transition to recapitulation	Modulation from D♭ major to C major	
199	Recapitulation	C and G key areas	Restatement of primary theme starting with the second period (2–3–1) followed by restatement the secondary theme and then transition theme leading to coda
282	Coda	C and G key areas	Final statement of the period 1 and 2 of the primary theme block (in the order 1–2–1)

=== IV. Allegro energico e passionato ===
This last movement is notable as a rare example of a symphonic passacaglia, which is similar to a chaconne with the slight difference that the subject can appear in more voices than the bass. For the repeating theme, Brahms adapted the chaconne theme in the closing movement of Johann Sebastian Bach's cantata, Nach dir, Herr, verlanget mich, BWV 150. The main theme is 8 bars long and is heard at the very start of the movement. Brahms then repeats the theme in different variations precisely 30 times always 8 bars long, until he deviates from this pattern just before the coda which begins in bar 253 at "Piu Allegro". 4 bars before the coda Brahms changes for the first time during the whole movement the 8 bar pattern and creates a 4 bar long transition into the coda.

An analysis of this last movement by Walter Frisch provides yet further interpretation to Brahms' structure of this work, by giving sections sonata form dimensions.

Arnold Schoenberg, in his essay Brahms the Progressive (Brahms is often characterized as a conservative composer), pointed out several thematic relationships in the score, as does Malcolm MacDonald in his biography of the composer. The first half of the chaconne theme is anticipated in the violins during the coda at an important point of the preceding movement; and the first movement's descending thirds, transposed by a fifth, appear in counterpoint during one of the final variations of the chaconne, immediately before the coda.

Bar	Section	Key	Description
1	Theme	E minor	Statement of theme and main chordal structure
9	Variations 1–11	Mostly in E minor and C major key areas as well as in other keys	Variations match the bar count and chordal structure (though in some variations transposed to different key). 3/4 time
97	Variations 12–15	E minor (12) and E major (13-15) key areas	Variations match the bar count (though with bars lasting twice as long) and chordal structure (though transposed to different key areas). 3/2 time
129	Variations 16–23	E minor and C major key area	Variations match the bar count and chordal structure (though transposed to different key areas). 3/4 time
193	Variations 24–26	Mostly in E minor and C major key area	Structurally variation 24 is similar to variation 1, variation 25 is similar to variation 2 and variation 26 is similar to variation 3. 3/4 time
217	Variations 27–30	Mostly in E minor and C major key area	Variations match the bar count and chordal structure (though transposed to different key areas). 3/4 time
249	Transition to coda	E major and C major key area	Extension of the last variation (variation 30).
253	Coda	Many different key areas	Playing on material from the variations with intermittent quasi-variations
297	Final statement of theme	E minor	Compressed statement of theme and final cadence

== Reception ==
The work was given its premiere in Meiningen on 25 October 1885, with Brahms himself conducting. The piece had earlier been given to a small private audience in a version for two pianos, played by Brahms and Ignaz Brüll. Brahms' friend and biographer Max Kalbeck, reported that the critic Eduard Hanslick, acting as one of the page-turners, exclaimed on hearing the first movement at this performance: "For this whole movement I had the feeling that I was being given a beating by two incredibly intelligent people." Hanslick, however, wrote also that "[for] the musician, there is not another modern piece so productive as a subject for study. It is like a dark well; the longer we look into it, the more brightly the stars shine back."

The musicologist Donald Tovey praises the work as “one of the greatest orchestral works since Beethoven”, and singles out the end of the first movement, which “bears comparison with the greatest climaxes in classical music, not excluding Beethoven”. The symphony is rich in allusions, most notably to various Beethoven compositions. The symphony may well have been inspired by the tragedies of Sophocles, which Brahms had been researching at the time.

== Notes ==
Sources

- Frisch, Walter (2003). Brahms: The Four Symphonies. New Haven: Yale University Press. ISBN 9780300099652.
