= Symphony No. 36 (Mozart) =

1783 composition by W. A. Mozart

- Linz
- by W. A. Mozart
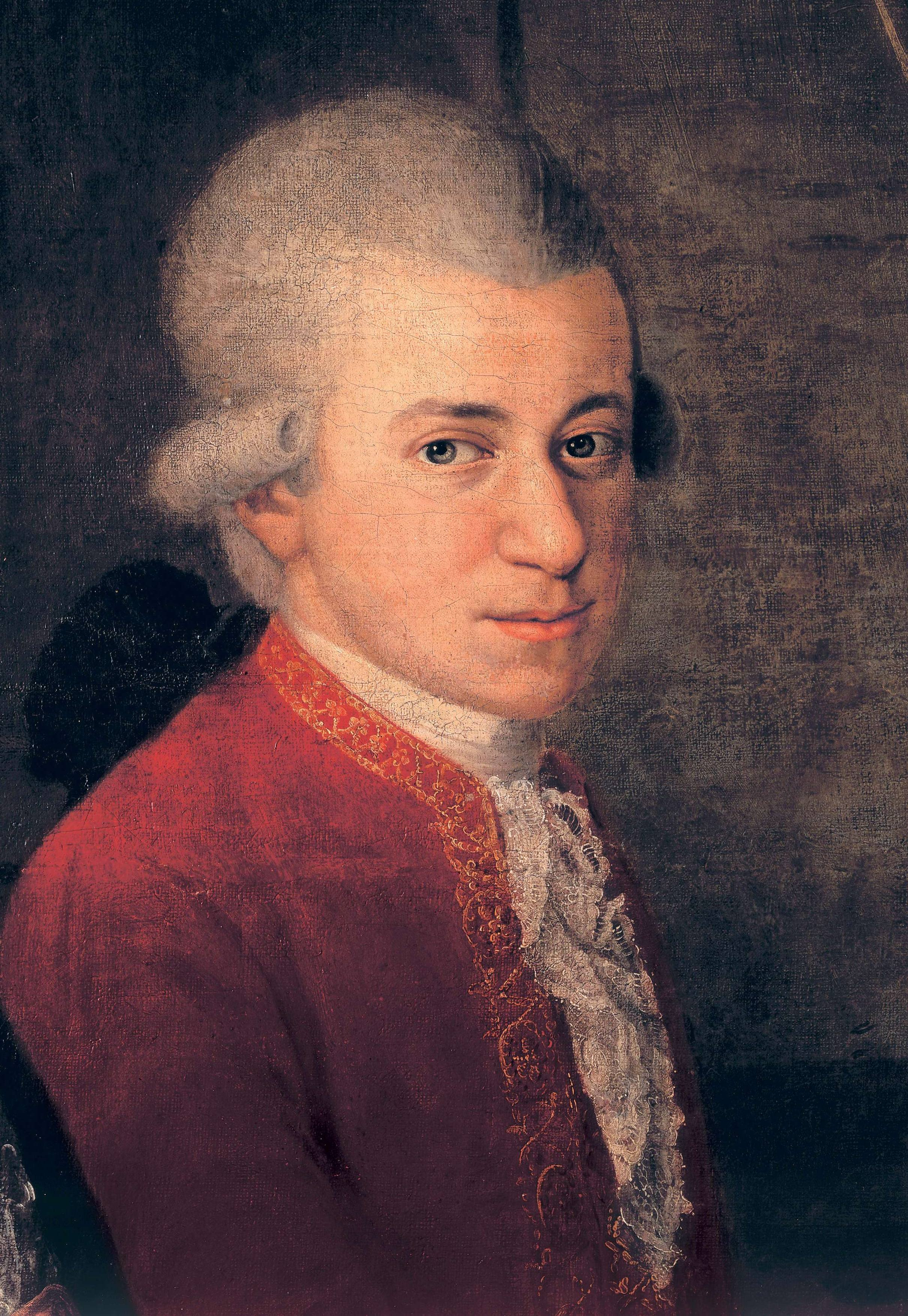
- Detail of Wolfgang from the 1780–81 Portrait of the Mozart Family
- Key: C major
- Catalogue: K. 425
- Style: Classical period
- Composed: 1783
- Performed: 4 November 1783
- Duration: c. 30 minutes
- Movements: 4
- Scoring: Orchestra

Symphony No. 36
I. Adagio – Allegro spiritoso

II. Andante con moto

III. Menuetto

IV. Presto
Performed by the Tsumugi Orchestra conducted by Takashi Inoue (2013)

Mozart's Symphony No. 36 in C major, K. 425, also known as the Linz Symphony, was written over four days in November 1783 when the composer and his wife Constanze stopped in Linz on their way home to Vienna after a trip to Salzburg. When Johann Joseph Anton, the Count of Thun, heard of the composer's arrival, he announced a concert. The symphony premiered in Linz on 4 November 1783, and was later performed in Vienna on 1 April 1784. The autograph score of the symphony was not preserved, but sections sold by Mozart to the Fürstenberg court at Donaueschingen in 1786 survive.

== Structure ==
The symphony is scored for 2 oboes, 2 bassoons, 2 horns, 2 trumpets, timpani and strings.

There are four movements:

1. Adagio, 3/4 – Allegro spiritoso, 4/4
2. Andante in F major, 6/8
3. Menuetto – Trio, 3/4
4. Presto, 2/4

Every movement except the minuet is in sonata form.

The first movement briefly quotes the famous Hallelujah Chorus from Handel's Messiah in the exposition.

The slow movement has a siciliano character and meter which was rare in Mozart's earlier symphonies (only used in one of the slow movements of No. 31) but would appear frequently in later works such as No. 38 and No. 40.
