= Symphony No. 2 (Brahms) =

- by Johannes Brahms
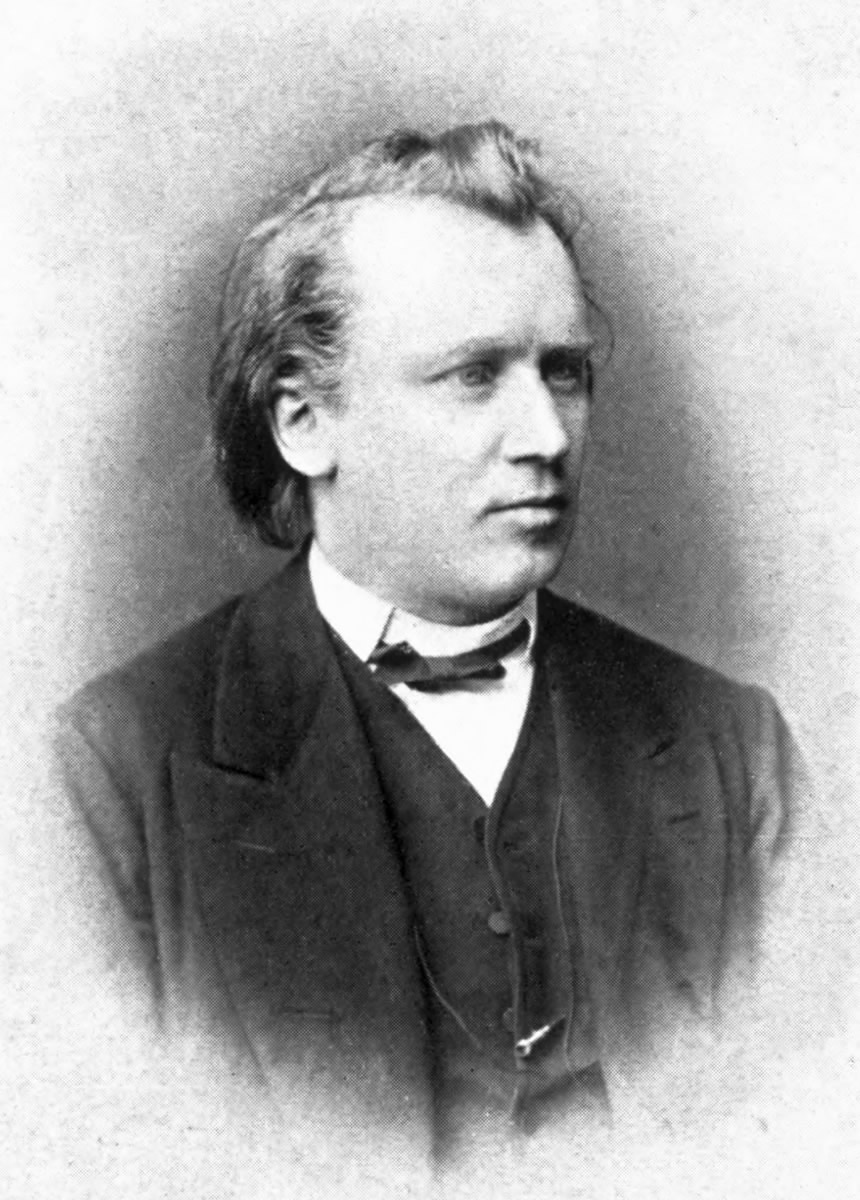
- The composer c. 1872
- Key: D major
- Opus: 73
- Composed: 1877
- Duration: c. 45 minutes
- Movements: 4
- Scoring: Orchestra

Premiere
- Date: 30 December 1877
- Location: Vienna
- Conductor: Hans Richter
- Performers: Vienna Philharmonic

Symphony No. 2 in D major, Op. 73, was composed by Johannes Brahms in the summer of 1877, during a visit to Pörtschach am Wörthersee, a town in the Austrian province of Carinthia. Its composition was brief in comparison with the 21 years it took him to complete his First Symphony.

The cheery and almost pastoral mood of the symphony often invites comparison with Beethoven's Sixth Symphony, but, perhaps mischievously, Brahms wrote to his publisher on 22 November 1877 that the symphony "is so melancholy that you will not be able to bear it. I have never written anything so sad, and the score must come out in mourning."

The premiere was given in Vienna on 30 December 1877 by the Vienna Philharmonic under the direction of Hans Richter; Walter Frisch notes that it had originally been scheduled for 9 December, but "in one of those little ironies of music history, it had to be postponed [because] the players were so preoccupied with learning Das Rheingold by Richard Wagner." A typical performance lasts between 40 and 50 minutes, depending significantly on whether the first movement repeat is taken.

== Instrumentation ==
The symphony is scored for two flutes, two oboes, two clarinets, two bassoons, four horns, two trumpets, three trombones, tuba, timpani, and strings.

== Movements ==
Symphony No. 2 in D major, Op. 73
I. Allegro non troppo

II. Adagio non troppo

III. Allegretto grazioso

IV. Allegro con spirito

In the Second Symphony, Brahms preserved the structural principles of the classical symphony, in which two lively outer movements frame a slow second movement followed by a short scherzo:

1. Allegro non troppo (D major)
2. Adagio non troppo (B major)
3. Allegretto grazioso (quasi andantino) (G major)
4. Allegro con spirito (D major)

=== I. Allegro non troppo ===
The cellos and double-basses start the first-movement sonata form in a tranquil mood and "serene" mood by introducing the first phrase of the principal theme, which is continued by the horns. The woodwinds develop the section and other instruments join in. A new melody, based on the three opening notes, appears in the violins, imitated by the woodwind. This gradually progresses to a full-bodied forte (at bar 58). At bar 82, the violas and cellos introduce the movement's second "Lullaby" theme in F♯ minor, which eventually moves to A major.

The development begins with a restatement of the opening theme, which modulates through several keys. A fugal passage follows, based on a fragment of this theme. It is interrupted by the three-note motive from the first bar, first in the woodwind and brass, then in diminished form in the strings. This gives way to mysterious statements of the violin melody in minor keys, interspersed with the opening figure of the horn theme. The music builds to a climax, with the orchestra playing this two-note figure fortissimo, before dying away unexpectedly.

The recapitulation begins at bar 302 in D minor, with the second theme returning at bar 350. The principal theme and violin melody are played simultaneously, before the transition to the second theme. Towards the conclusion of the movement, Brahms marked bar 497 as in tempo, sempre tranquillo, and it is this mood which pervades the remainder of the movement as it closes in the home key of D major.

The second theme's opening bars are recognizable for their passing resemblance to Wiegenlied, Op. 49, the tune commonly referred to as "Brahms's Lullaby". It is introduced at bar 82 and is continually brought back, reshaped and changed both rhythmically and harmonically.

=== II. Adagio non troppo ===
This movement is characterised by the use of developing variation. A brooding theme introduced by the cellos from bars 1 to 12, with a counter-melody in the bassoons, begins the second movement. A second theme, marked L'istesso tempo, ma grazioso, appears in bar 33. After a brief development section, the recapitulation of the first theme (the second theme is absent) is highly modified. The movement then finishes with a coda-like section in which the main theme is reintroduced in the end.

=== III. Allegretto grazioso (quasi andantino) ===
The third movement minuet opens with pizzicato cellos accompanying a lilting oboe melody in G major. A contrasting section in 2/4 time marked Presto ma non assai begins in the strings, and this theme is soon taken over by the full orchestra (minus trumpets). Bar 107 returns to the main tempo and gentle mood, but the idyll setting is again disrupted in bar 126 when the earlier Presto marking makes a re-entry, this time in a 3/8 variation. Brahms yet again diverts the movement back into its principal tempo (bar 194) and thereafter to its peaceful close.

The third movement contains very light articulated sections, very similar in character to the Slavonic Dances of Brahms' contemporary, Dvořák. This lighter element provides a contrast to the previous two movements.

=== IV. Allegro con spirito ===
Mysterious sotto voce strings open the final Allegro con spirito, again in sonata form. The full orchestra suddenly announces the arrival of the main theme, unveiling "...the blazing sunrise of the most athletic and ebulliently festive movement Brahms ever wrote". As the initial excitement fades, violins introduce a new subject in A major marked largamente (to be played broadly). The wind instruments repeat this until it develops into a climax. Bar 155 of the movement repeats the symphony's first subject again, but instead of the joyful outburst heard earlier, Brahms introduces the movement's development section. A mid-movement tranquillo section (bar 206, and reappearing in the coda) elaborates earlier material and slows down the movement to allow a buildup of energy into the recapitulation. The first theme comes in again (bar 244) and the familiar orchestral forte is played. The second theme also reappears in the tonic key. Towards the end of the symphony, descending chords and a mazy run of notes by various instruments of the orchestra (bars 395 to 412) sound out the second theme again but this time drowned out in a blaze of brass instruments as the symphony ends in a triumphant mood.

== See also ==
- Symphony No. 1 (Brahms)
- Symphony No. 6 (Beethoven)
- Symphony No. 6 (Dvořák)
