= Die Walküre discography =

This is a partial discography of Richard Wagner's opera Die Walküre. It was first performed at the National Theatre Munich on 26 June 1870.

== Recordings ==
Year	Cast Siegmund Sieglinde Wotan Brünnhilde Hunding Fricka	Conductor, Opera house and orchestra	Label/Notes
1929	Walter Kirchhoff; Olga Schramm-Tschörner; Ludwig Weber; Henriette Gottlieb	Franz von Hoesslin; Orchestre Walter Staram	CD: Gebhardt; Cat: JGCD 0016-3; Excerpts
1935	Lauritz Melchior; Lotte Lehmann; Emanuel List	Bruno Walter; Vienna Philharmonic Orchestra	78rpm: His Master's Voice; Act 1 and Act 2: Scenes 3 and 5 only, Mono
1935	Paul Althouse; Kirsten Flagstad; Emanuel List	Artur Bodanzky; Metropolitan Opera	CD: Archipel; Cat: ARPCD 0039-3; Act 1 only
1936	Lauritz Melchior; Lotte Lehmann; Friedrich Schorr; Kirsten Flagstad; Emanuel List; Kathryn Meisle	Fritz Reiner; San Francisco Opera Orchestra	CD: Music & Arts CD-1272; Act 2 only, Mono, Live
1940	Lauritz Melchior; Marjorie Lawrence; Julius Huehn; Kirsten Flagstad; Emanuel List; Karin Branzell	Erich Leinsdorf; Metropolitan Opera orchestra & chorus	CD: Sony Classical; Cat: 88765-42717-2; Mono, Live
1941	Lauritz Melchior; Astrid Varnay; Friedrich Schorr; Helen Traubel; Alexander Kipnis; Kerstin Thorborg	Erich Leinsdorf; Metropolitan Opera orchestra & chorus	CD: Naxos; Cat: 8.110058-60; Mono, Live
1944	Lauritz Melchior; Rose Bampton; Helen Traubel; Herbert Janssen; Alexander Kipnis; Kerstin Thorborg	George Szell; Metropolitan Opera orchestra & chorus	CD: MYTO; Cat: 022.H065; Mono, Live
1945	Irene Jessner; Herbert Janssen; Helen Traubel	Artur Rodzinsky; New York Philharmonic	CD: PACO180; Act three only
1949	Max Lorenz; Rose Bampton; Joel Berglund; Helen Traubel; Lyobumir Videnov; Kerstin Thorborg	Fritz Stiedry; Metropolitan Opera orchestra & chorus	CD: Archipel; Mono, Live
1949	Günther Treptow; Hilde Konetzni; Ferdinand Frantz; Helena Braun; Herbert Alsen; Rosette Anday	Rudolf Moralt; Vienna Philharmonic	CD: Myto
1950	Günther Treptow; Hilde Konetzni; Ferdinand Frantz; Kirsten Flagstad; Ludwig Weber; Elisabeth Höngen	Wilhelm Furtwängler; Teatro alla Scala orchestra & chorus	CD: Opera d'Oro; Cat: OPD1501 (complete Ring) Mono, Live
1951	Torsten Ralf; Helene Werth; Ludwig Hofmann; Gertrude Grob-Prandl; Herbert Alsen; Georgine von Milinkovic	Robert F. Denzler; Orchestre de la Suisse Romande	CD: Walhall; Cat: WLCD 0134; Mono, Live
1951	Leonie Rysanek; Sigurd Björling; Astrid Varnay	Herbert von Karajan; Bayreuth Festival Orchestra	CD: EMI; Act 3 only
1951	Ludwig Suthaus; Maria Müller; Josef Herrmann; Paula Buchner; Josef Greindl; Margarete Klose	Ferenc Fricsay; Deutsche Oper Berlin	CD: Myto
1953	Ramon Vinay; Regina Resnik; Hans Hotter; Astrid Varnay; Josef Greindl; Ira Malaniuk	Clemens Krauss; Bayreuth Festival Orchestra & chorus	CD: Gala Records; Cat: GL 100.652; Mono, Live
1953	Wolfgang Windgassen; Hilde Konetzni; Ferdinand Frantz; Martha Mödl; Gottlob Frick; Elsa Cavelti	Wilhelm Furtwängler; Orchestra Sinfonica e Coro della RAI	CD: EMI; Cat: CHS 7 63045 2 Mono, Studio
1954	Ludwig Suthaus; Leonie Rysanek; Ferdinand Frantz; Martha Mödl; Gottlob Frick; Margarete Klose	Wilhelm Furtwängler; Vienna Philharmonic	CD: EMI; Cat: CHS 7 63045 2 Mono, Studio
1954	Max Lorenz; Martha Mödl; Hans Hotter; Astrid Varnay; Josef Greindl; Georgine von Milinkovic	Joseph Keilberth; Bayreuth Festival Orchestra & chorus	CD: Archipel; Cat: CHS 7 63045 2 Mono, Live
1955	Ramón Vinay; Gré Brouwenstijn; Hans Hotter; Astrid Varnay; Josef Greindl; Georgine von Milinkovic	Joseph Keilberth; Bayreuth Festival Orchestra & chorus	CD: Testament; Cat: SBT41391; Stereo, Live
1956	Wolfgang Windgassen; Gré Brouwenstijn; Hans Hotter; Astrid Varnay; Josef Greindl; Georgine von Milinkovic	Hans Knappertsbusch; Bayreuth Festival Orchestra	CD: Orfeo
1957	Ramón Vinay; Sylvia Fisher; Hans Hotter; Birgit Nilsson; Friedrich Dalberg; Georgine von Milinkovic	Rudolf Kempe; Royal Opera House orchestra & chorus	CD: Testament; Cat: SBT131426 (complete Ring) Mono, Live
1959	Ramón Vinay; Amy Shuard; Hans Hotter; Astrid Varnay; Kurt Böhme; Ursula Boese	Franz Konwitschny; Royal Opera House orchestra & chorus	CD: Walhall; Cat: WLCD 0316; Mono, Live
1961	Jon Vickers; Gré Brouwenstijn; George London; Birgit Nilsson; David Ward; Rita Gorr	Erich Leinsdorf; London Symphony Orchestra	CD: Decca; Cat: 430 391-2; Stereo, Studio
1965	James King; Régine Crespin; Hans Hotter; Birgit Nilsson; Gottlob Frick; Christa Ludwig	Georg Solti; Vienna Philharmonic	CD: Decca; Cat: 414 105-2; Stereo, Studio 1967 Grammy Award for Best Opera Recording
1966	Jon Vickers; Gundula Janowitz; Thomas Stewart; Régine Crespin; Martti Talvela; Josephine Veasey	Herbert von Karajan; Berlin Philharmonic	CD: Deutsche Grammophon; Cat: 415 145-2; Stereo, Studio
1967	Jess Thomas; Helga Dernesch; Theo Adam; Anja Silja; NN; Grace Hoffman	Thomas Schippers; Bayreuth Festival Orchestra (at Osaka International Festival)	DVD: Premiere Opera; Cat: 5853; Live
1973	James King; Leonie Rysanek; Theo Adam; Birgit Nilsson; Gerd Nienstedt; Annelies Burmeister	Karl Böhm; Bayreuth Festival Orchestra & chorus	CD: Philips; Cat: 412 478-2; Stereo, Live
1975	Alberto Remedios; Margaret Curphey; Norman Bailey; Rita Hunter; Clifford Grant; Ann Howard	Reginald Goodall; English National Opera	CD: Chandos
1980	Peter Hofmann; Jeannine Altmeyer; Donald McIntyre; Gwyneth Jones; Matti Salminen; Hanna Schwarz	Pierre Boulez; Bayreuth Festival Orchestra & chorus	CD: Philips; Cat: 434 422-2; Stereo, Studio
1981	Siegfried Jerusalem; Jessye Norman; Theo Adam; Jeannine Altmeyer; Kurt Moll; Yvonne Minton	Marek Janowski; Staatskapelle Dresden orchestra & chorus	CD: Eurodisc / RCA; Cat: RCA 7 4321 45417 2 (complete Ring) Stereo, Studio
1987	Gary Lakes; Jessye Norman; James Morris; Hildegard Behrens; Kurt Moll; Christa Ludwig	James Levine; Metropolitan Opera orchestra & chorus	CD: Deutsche Grammophon; Cat: 423 389-2; Stereo, Studio
1988	Reiner Goldberg; Cheryl Studer; James Morris; Éva Marton; Matti Salminen; Waltraud Meier	Bernard Haitink; Bavarian Radio Symphony Orchestra	CD: EMI; Cat: CDS 7 49534 2 Stereo, Studio
1989	Robert Schunk; Julia Varady; Robert Hale; Hildegard Behrens; Kurt Moll; Marjana Lipovšek	Wolfgang Sawallisch; Bavarian State Opera orchestra & chorus	CD: EMI; Cat: 724357273121 (complete Ring) Stereo, Live
1992	Poul Elming; Nadine Secunde; John Tomlinson; Anne Evans; Matthias Hölle; Linda Finnie	Daniel Barenboim; Bayreuth Festival Orchestra & chorus	CD: Teldec; Cat: 4509-91186-2; Stereo, Live
1997	Poul Elming; Alessandra Marc; Robert Hale; Gabriele Schnaut; Alfred Muff; Anja Silja	Christoph von Dohnányi; Cleveland Orchestra	CD: Decca; Cat: 440 371-2; Stereo, Studio
1995	Edward Cook; Gabriele Maria Ronge; John Wegner; Carla Pohl; Frode Olsen; Zlatomira Nikolova	Günter Neuhold; Badische Staatskapelle	CD: Brilliant Classics; Cat: 99801 (complete Ring) Stereo, Live
2002	Peter Seiffert; Waltraud Meier; John Tomlinson; Gabriele Schnaut; Kurt Rydl; Mihoko Fujimura	Zubin Mehta; Bavarian Radio Symphony Orchestra	CD: Farao; Cat: A 108088; Stereo, Live
2002–2003	Robert Gambill; Angela Denoke; Jan-Hendrik Rootering; Renate Behle; Attila Jun; Tichina Vaughn	Lothar Zagrosek; Staatsoper Stuttgart orchestra & chorus (Recordings at Württembergische Staatsoper)	CD: Naxos Records; Cat: 8.660172-74; DVD: TDK "Mediactive"; Cat: DV-OPRDNW; Stereo (SACD), Live
2003–2004	Richard Berkeley-Steele; Linda Watson; Falk Struckmann; Deborah Polaski; Eric Halfvarson; Lioba Braun	Bertrand de Billy; Orquestra Simfònica del Gran Teatre del Liceu	DVD: Opus Arte; ASIN: B000IFRPY6; Surround Sound, Live
2004	Stuart Skelton; Deborah Riedel; John Bröcheler; Lisa Gasteen; Richard Green; Elizabeth Campbell	Asher Fisch; Adelaide Symphony Orchestra	CD: Melba; Cat: MR 301091-94; Stereo (SACD), Live
2006	Robert Gambill; Eva-Maria Westbroek; Willard White; Eva Johansson; Mikhail Petrenko; Lilli Paasikivi	Simon Rattle; Berlin Philharmonic	DVD: Bel Air Classiques
2006	Stig Fogh Andersen; Gitta-Marie Sjöberg; James Johnson; Iréne Theorin; Stephen Milling; Randi Stene	Michael Schønwandt; Royal Danish Orchestra	DVD: Decca
2008	Stuart Skelton; Yvonne Naef; Falk Struckmann; Deborah Polaski; Mikhail Petrenko; Jeanne Piland	Simone Young; Philharmoniker Hamburg	CD: Oehms Classics; CAT: OC 929; Stereo, Live
2009	Endrik Wottrich; Eva-Maria Westbroek; Albert Dohmen; Linda Watson; Kwangchul Youn; Michelle Breedt	Christian Thielemann; Bayreuth Festival Orchestra & chorus	CD: Opus Arte; Cat: OACD9000BD (complete Ring) Stereo, Live
2010	Jonas Kaufmann; Eva-Maria Westbroek; Bryn Terfel; Deborah Voigt; Hans-Peter König; Stephanie Blythe	James Levine; Metropolitan Opera orchestra	DVD: Deutsche Grammophon; Cat: 073 4855; Blu-ray DVD, Live
2010	Simon O'Neill; Waltraud Meier; Vitaliji Kowaljow; Nina Stemme; John Tomlinson; Ekaterina Gubanova	Daniel Barenboim; Teatro alla Scala Orchestra and Chorus	DVD: Arthaus Musik; Cat: 101694; Blu-ray DVD, Live
2011	Stig Fogh Andersen; Yvonne Howard; Egils Siliņš; Susan Bullock; Clive Bayley; Susan Bickley	Mark Elder; The Hallé	CD: Hallé; Cat: CD HLD 7531; Stereo, Live
2011	Frank van Aken; Eva-Maria Westbroek; Terje Stensvold; Susan Bullock; Ain Anger; Martina Dike	Sebastian Weigle; Frankfurt Opera orchestra	CD: Oehms; Cat: OC 936; Stereo Live
2011	Christopher Ventris; Eric Halfvarson; Albert Dohmen; Waltraud Meier; Katarina Dalayman; Janina Baechle	Christian Thielemann; Orchestra of the Vienna State Opera	CD: Deutsche Grammophon; Cat: 0289 479 1560 7 (complete Ring) Stereo, Live
2012	Jonas Kaufmann; Anja Kampe; René Pape; Nina Stemme; Mikhail Petrenko; Ekaterina Gubanova	Valery Gergiev; Mariinsky Theatre Orchestra	CD: Mariinsky Label; Cat: MAR0527; Stereo (4 x Hybrid SACD)
2013	Robert Dean Smith; Melanie Diener; Tomasz Konieczny; Petra Lang; Timo Riihonen; Iris Vermillion	Marek Janowski; Berlin Radio Symphony Orchestra; Berlin Radio Choir	SACD: Pentatone; Cat: PTC 5186407; Stereo (SACD), Live
2014	Stuart Skelton; Margaret Jane Wray; Greer Grimsley; Alwyn Mellor; Andrea Silverstrelli] Stephanie Blythe	Asher Fisch; Seattle Symphony Orchestra; Seattle Opera Chorus	CD: Avie Records; Cat: AV2313 (complete Ring) Stereo, Live
2016	Stuart Skelton; Heidi Melton; Matthias Goerne; Petra Lang; Falk Struckmann; Michelle DeYoung	Jaap van Zweden, Hong Kong Philharmonic	CD: Naxos; Cat: 866039497; Stereo, Live
2019	Michael Weinius; Sarah Ferede; James Rutherford; Linda Watson; Łukasz Konieczny; Katarzyna Kuncio	Axel Kober; Duisburg Philharmonic	CD: cAvi
2020	Stuart Skelton; Emily Magee; John Lundgren; Nina Stemme; Ain Anger; Sarah Connolly	Antonio Pappano, Royal Opera House orchestra, Keith Warner, stage director	DVD:Opus Arte; Cat:OA1308D
2020	Stuart Skelton; Eva-Maria Westbroek; James Rutherford; Iréne Theorin; Eric Halfvarson; Elisabeth Kulman	Simon Rattle, Orchester des Bayerischen Rundfunks	CD:BR-Klassik; Cat:900177
