= William Wernigk =

German-born Austrian tenor (1894–1973)

- Born: 5 February 1894; Chemnitz, German Empire
- Died: 21 January 1973 (aged 78); Vienna, Austria
- Occupation: Operatic tenor
- Organizations: Vienna State Opera

William Wernigk (5 February 1894 – 21 January 1973) was an Austrian operatic tenor, who was a member of the ensemble of the Vienna State Opera for 44 years, in roles such as Pedrillo in Mozart's Die Entführung aus dem Serail and Monostatos in Die Zauberflöte, Cassio in Verdi's Otello and Goro in Puccini's Madama Butterfly, as well as many comprimario roles. He appeared as a guest around Europe and performed at the Salzburg Festival both in concert and on stage, taking part in the world premiere of Gottfried von Einem's Dantons Tod there in 1947. He performed in early complete opera recordings such as Der Rosenkavalier by Strauss with Robert Heger in 1933, and Mozart's Die Zauberflöte with Arturo Toscanini in 1937.

== Life ==
Wernigk was born in Chemnitz. During his school years, Wernigk became a member of the Schülerverbindung Nibelungia Wien. He was drafted into military service in 1914 and seriously wounded in Russia in 1915. From 1915, he lived in Vienna and trained as an opera singer, mainly self-taught. In 1919, he was engaged by the Vienna State Opera, where he remained a member of the ensemble until his retirement in 1963. Wernigk was a versatile spieltenor with good acting skills. He appeared in roles such as Pedrillo in Mozart's Die Entführung aus dem Serail and Monostatos in Die Zauberflöte, and Wenzel in Smetana's Die verkaufte Braut. His Italian repertoire included Cassio in Verdi's Otello, Goro in Puccini's Madama Butterfly and Altoum and Pong in Turandot. He appeared as Dr. Falke in Die Fledermaus by Johann Strauss 85 times. As a comprimario actor, he became a mainstay of the Vienna State Opera ensemble, also taking on very minor roles such as servant, doorman, sailor, tailor, messenger, executioner, hotel manager and other service providers, the First prisoner in Beethoven's Fidelio and the First armoured man in Die Zauberflöte. He also performed musically intricate ensemble roles such as the Second Jew in Salome. In Der Rosenkavalier by Richard Strauss, and in four roles in which he appeared between 1920 and 1956: 215 times as the Servant to Faninal, 176 times as the Innkeeper, 8 times as Valzacchi and 4 times as the Servant to the Feldmarschallin, sometimes in two roles the same evening, including when the ensemble performed at the Internationale Maifestspiele Wiesbaden and in Brussels in 1953.

From 1927 to 1949, he was a regular guest at the Salzburg Festival, where he also appeared in the Domkonzerte concert series, including Bruckner's Messe No. 3 in 1933, and Mozart's Mass in C major, K. 337, in 1936. On stage, he performed many of his Vienna roles. In 1947, he took part in the world premiere of Gottfried von Einem's Dantons Tod there, conducted by Ferenc Fricsay and alongside Paul Schöffler in the title role, Julius Patzak as Desmoulins, and Maria Cebotari as Lucile.

He appeared as guest at the Semperoper in Dresden in 1927, in Milan, in Paris in 1928 and 1936, at the Vienna Volksoper in 1940 and at the Maggio Musicale Fiorentino in 1935.

Wernigk died in Vienna at the age of 80.

== Roles ==
=== Premieres ===
- 1935: Die Dame im Traum by Franz Salmhofer, Vienna State Opera (26 December) – Hotel director
- 1947: Dantons Tod by Gottfried von Einem, Salzburg Festival, (8 August) – First executioner

=== Repertoire ===
Wernigk appeared in many roles at the Vienna State Opera, including:

Beethoven: First prisoner in Fidelio; Berg: Jester in Wozzeck; Bizet: Dancairo / Remendado in Carmen; Giordano: Abbé / Incroyable in Andrea Chénier; Humperdinck: Witch in Hänsel und Gretel; Korngold: Victorin / Count Albert in Die tote Stadt; Lehár: Pierrino / Street singer in Giuditta; Lortzing: Georg in Der Waffenschmied; Pankratius in Der Wildschütz; Officer in Zar und Zimmermann; Meyerbeer: Cossé / Tavannes in Les Huguenots; Door keeper in L'Africaine; Mozart: Pedrillo / Klaas / Leader of the guards in Die Entführung aus dem Serail; Don Curzio / Don Basilio in Le nozze di Figaro; Monostatos / First priest / First armoured man in The Magic Flute; Nicolai: Junker Spärlich / Waiter in The Merry Wives of Windsor; Offenbach: Andrès / Cochenille / Frantz / Pitichinaccio in Les Contes d'Hoffmann; Pfitzner: Bishop of Budoja / Master of the art of sound / Chapel singer of St. Maria in Palestrina	Puccini: Alcindoro in La bohème; Spoletta in Tosca; Goro / Sharpless in Madama Butterfly; Harry / Joe in La fanciulla del West; Gherardo in Gianni Schicchi; Altoum / Pong / Pang in Turandot; Johann Strauß II.: Dr. Falke / Alfred / Frank / Murray in Die Fledermaus; Richard Strauss: Narraboth / Second Nazarene / Second Jew / Third Jew in Salome; Young servant in Elektra; Servant to Faninal / Servant to the Feldmarschallin / Valzacchi / Innkeeper in Der Rosenkavalier; Brighella / Scaramuccio / Wigmaker / Officer in Ariadne auf Naxos; Count Elemér in Arabella; Servant in Capriccio; Verdi: Hauptmann in Simon Boccanegra; Borsa in Rigoletto; Judge in Un ballo in maschera; Tebaldo in Don Carlos; Messenger in Aida; Cassio in Otello; Wagner: Helmsman in Der fliegende Holländer; Brabant nobleman in Lohengrin; David / Augustin Moser / Balthasar Zorn in Die Meistersinger von Nürnberg; Mime in Das Rheingold; Mime in Siegfried; Weinberger: Executioner / Devil's Famulus in Schwanda the Bagpiper; Wolf-Ferrari: Filipeto in I quatro rusteghi

== Recordings ==
Wernigk's recordings include:

Complete recordings

- Mozart: Le nozze di Figaro, conductor: Bruno Walter (1937) – as Don Basilio
- Mozart: Die Zauberflöte, conductor: Arturo Toscanini (1937) – as Monostatos
- Richard Strauss: Der Rosenkavalier, conductor: Robert Heger (1933) – as the Innkeeper

Individual scenes from archive recordings of the Vienna State Opera

- David in Wagner's Die Meistersinger von Nürnberg
- Mime in Wagner's Der Ring des Nibelungen (1948)
