= Walter Berry (bass-baritone) =

Austrian opera singer (1929-2000)

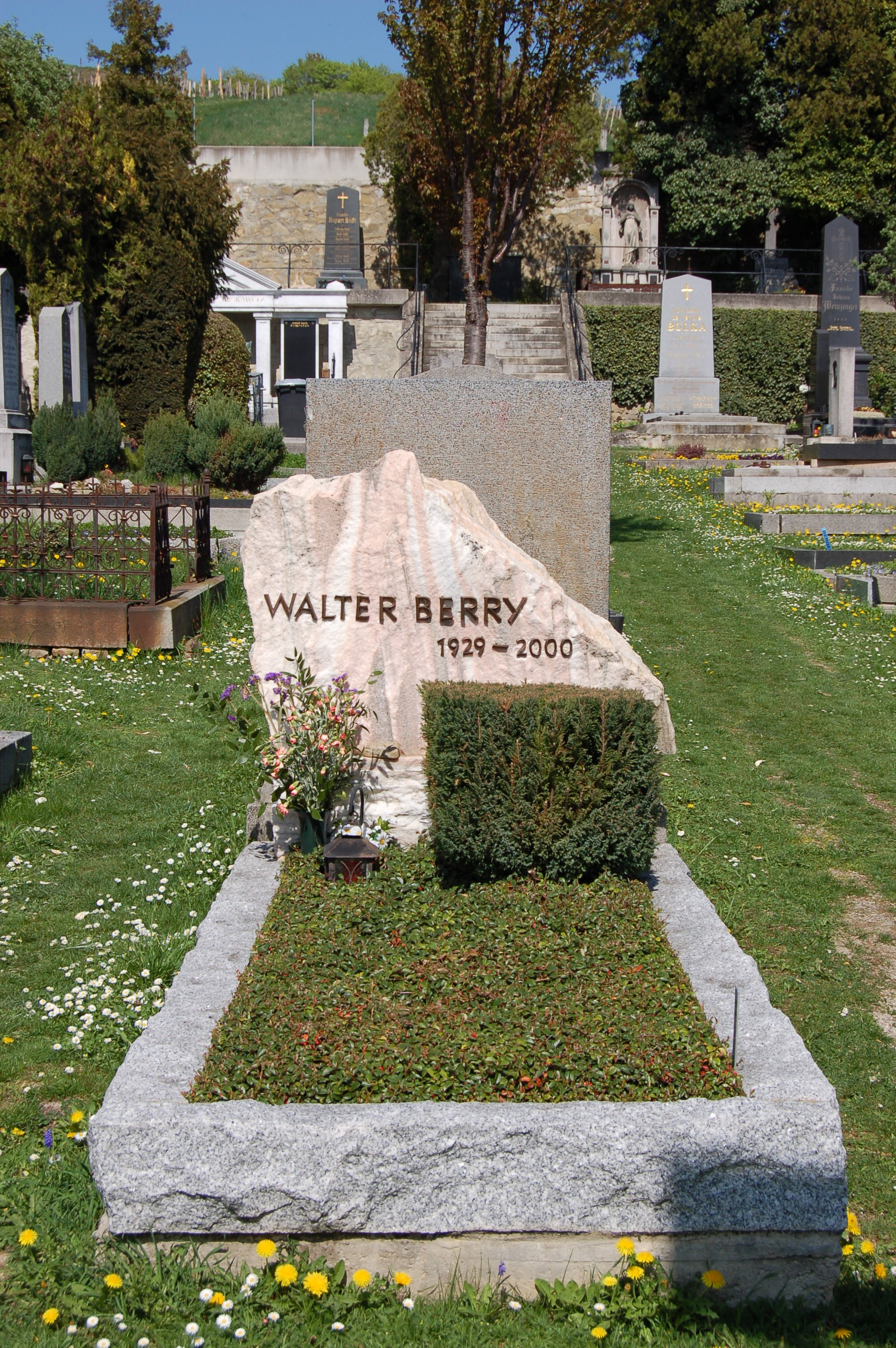
- Grave in the Heiligenstädter Friedhof cemetery
- Born: 8 April 1929; Vienna, Austria
- Died: 27 October 2000 (aged 71); Vienna, Austria
- Education: University of Music and Performing Arts Vienna
- Occupation: Opera singer
- Years active: 1949–1998
- Spouse: Christa Ludwig (m. 1957; div. 1970)
- Children: Wolfgang

Walter Berry (8 April 1929 – 27 October 2000) was an Austrian lyric bass-baritone who enjoyed a prominent career in opera. He has been cited as one of several exemplary operatic bass-baritones of his era.

== Professional career ==
Walter Berry was born in Vienna. He studied voice at the Vienna Music Academy and made his stage debut with the Vienna State Opera in 1947. He became a permanent member of the company in 1950, remaining with that ensemble for his entire career, although he undertook frequent guest appearances elsewhere in Europe and in the UK.

In 1952, Berry made his first appearance at the Salzburg Festival, where he subsequently performed on a regular basis. While in Salzburg, he collaborated with Herbert von Karajan conducting the Vienna Philharmonic Orchestra in a production of Mozart's opera Don Giovanni with Leontyne Price and Elisabeth Schwarzkopf. While appearing in Vienna and Salzburg, Berry interpreted an extensive operatic repertoire which included over one hundred roles. He received high praise for his interpretations of the lieder of Franz Schubert as well as songs by Gustav Mahler. Included among his acclaimed renditions of sacred works were: Johann Sebastian Bach's "Passions" and Beethoven's Missa Solemnis.

Berry made many memorable appearances at the Metropolitan Opera in New York City during the 1960s and 1970s in such roles as Barak in Die Frau ohne Schatten, Telramund in Lohengrin, Wotan in Die Walküre, Baron Ochs in Der Rosenkavalier, Don Pizarro in Fidelio, Don Alfonso in Così fan tutte, the Music Master in Ariadne auf Naxos and Leporello in Don Giovanni. He sang his last Barak on 18 November 1984.

Berry's other signature roles include Papageno in Mozart's The Magic Flute, Figaro in Mozart's Marriage of Figaro and Bluebeard in Bartók's Bluebeard's Castle. He was also a noted interpreter of lieder and was accompanied often at recitals by the German pianist Sebastian Peschko. Berry also appeared in choral works. Performing in light-hearted operettas, particularly Die Fledermaus, was one of his pleasures.

Berry married mezzo-soprano Christa Ludwig in 1957 and collaborated with her both on stage and in several recordings. They were divorced in 1970.

=== Death ===
Walter Berry died in 2000 at the age of 71 in Vienna following a heart attack. He was entombed in the Heiligenstädter Friedhof cemetery (Part A, Group 1, Number 263) in Vienna.

== Recordings ==
External audio
- Berry in Mozart's Requiem with Herbert von Karajan conducting the Vienna Philharmonic Orchestra, and Leontyne Price, Hilde Rössel-Majdan, Fritz Wunderlich and Eberhhard Wächter in 1960 Here on archive.org

Berry was a prolific recording artist and participated in many highly acclaimed opera recordings, including the classic Otto Klemperer recordings of The Magic Flute (as Papageno) and Fidelio (as Don Pizarro), both for EMI Records. He also recorded Johann Sebastian Bach's sacred oratorio St. Matthew Passion for Columbia Records with Otto Klemperer and the Philharmonia Orchestra in 1961 and years later for Deutsche Grammophon with Herbert von Karajan and the Berlin Philharmonic in 1972.

Also included among his recorded performances are: Béla Bartók's Bluebeard's Castle (Decca Records), Beethoven's Missa solemnis (Deutsche Grammophone), Joseph Haydn's The Creation (Deutsche Grammophon), Mozart's Cosi Fan Tutte and Marriage of Figaro (both EMI), and Mozart's Bastien und Bastienne (Philips).

Critics at Billboard magazine noted that his collaboration with his wife Christa Ludwig in a recording of Bartók's Bluebeard's Castle was delivered with dramatic force and strength. In 1967, Billboard's critics also praised his recording with Ludwig of scenes from Richard Strauss's Elektra, Die Frau ohne Schatten and Der Rosenkavalier issued in the United States on the RCA Victrola label, as outstanding and worthy of Strauss' best traditions. Berry's definitive recordings have earned him the distinction of being cited as one of the truly exemplary bass baritones and basses in opera.

Berry recorded on DVD as Don Pizarro, opposite Ludwig, James King, and Josef Greindl; and as Papageno with Pilar Lorengar as Pamina; also as Leporello opposite Dietrich Fischer-Dieskau in the title role and Josef Greindl, in a performance in German of Don Giovanni.

== Discography ==
External audio
- Berry as Dr. Falke in Johann Strauss II's Die Fledermaus with Herbert von Karajan conducting the Vienna Philharmonic and Ettore Bastianini, Teresa Berganza, Jussi Björling, Hilde Gueden, Birgit Nilsson, Leontyne Price, Renata Tebaldi, Joan Sutherland, Eberhhard Wächter and Ljuba Welitsch in the mid 1960s Here on archive.org

A partial listing of Walter Berry's recordings includes:

- Don Giovanni (Wolfgang Amadeus Mozart): Dimitri Mitropoulos conducting the Vienna Philharmonic with Fernando Corena and Cesare Siepi (1956) (Sony)
- Die Fledermaus (Johann Strauss II): Herbert von Karajan conducting the Vienna Philharmonic with Hilde Gueden (1960) (Decca)
- Requiem K. 546 (Wolfgang Amadeus Mozart): Herbert von Karajan conducting the Berlin Philharmonic with Wilma Lipp (1962) (Deutsche Grammophon)
- Così fan Tutte (Wolfgang Amadeus Mozart): Karl Böhm conducting the Philharmonia Orchestra with Elisabeth Schwarzkopf and Christa Ludwig (1962) (EMI)
- Symphony No. 9 (Ludwig van Beethoven): Herbert von Karajan conducting the Berlin Philharmonic with Gundula Janowitz (1963) (Deutsche Grammophon).
- Die Zauberflöte (Wolfgang Amadeus Mozart): Otto Klemperer conducting the Philharmonia Orchestra with Gundula Janowitz and Nicolai Gedda (1964) (EMI)
- Bluebeard's Castle (Béla Bartók): István Kertész conducting the London Symphony Orchestra with Christa Ludwig (1966)(Decca).
- Wozzeck (Alban Berg): Pierre Boulez conducting the Orchestra of the National Paris Opera with Isabel Strauss and Fritz Uhl (1967) (Columbia Masterworks)
- The Creation (Joseph Haydn): Herbert von Karajan conducting the Berlin Philharmonic (1969) (Deutsche Grammophon)
- Die Zauberflöte (Wolfgang Amadeus Mozart): Wolfgang Sawallisch conducting the Orchestra of the Bavarian State Opera Munich with Edda Moser and Peter Schreier (1973) (EMI)
- Die Frau ohne Schatten (Richard Strauss): Karl Böhm conducting the Vienna State Opera Orchestra with Birgit Nilsson and James King (1985) (Deutsche Grammophon)
- Aida (Giuseppe Verdi) in German: Clemens Krauss conducting the Orchester des Bayerischen Rundfunks München with Leonora Lafayette (Aida), Josef Gostic (Radames), Georgine von Milinkovic (Amneris), Ferdinand Frantz (Amonasro), Gottlob Frick (Ramfis), Walter Berry (Il Re), Karl Ostertag (Bote), Elisabeth Lindermeier (Tempelsängerin), 1953 (2005 AfHO/Line Music GmbH - Cantus Classics 2005)

== See also ==
- List of Austrians in music
