= Leonora Lafayette =

American soprano

Leonora Gwendolyn Lafayette (born July 8, 1926, in Baton Rouge, Louisiana; died October 23, 1975) was an African American soprano with a significant career in Europe during the 1950s and 1960s.

== Biography ==
Leonora Lafayette was born to Howard and Lena Lafayette. In the 1930s, she grew up in a progressive and cohesive African American community known as "Old South Baton Rouge." She pursued her career while facing substantial racial, cultural, and economic barriers. She died of cancer at the age of 49.

== Education ==
Lafayette was denied admission to Louisiana State University due to segregation. However, she received a scholarship to study at the Juilliard School with Dusolina Giannini and won the John Hay Whitney Fellowship for study abroad. After graduating from Juilliard, she went to Basel.

== Career ==
In her early career in Switzerland, Lafayette won the Geneva Competition and debuted at Theater Basel on May 27, 1951, as Aida, a role she performed hundreds of times along with Madama Butterfly. She was the first Black artist to perform at Covent Garden, conducted by Sir John Barbirolli. On May 5, 1953, she sang Aida at the Prinzregententheater in Munich under Clemens Krauss. She performed at the Vienna State Opera on September 18, 1956, as Aida, and on February 11 and 14, 1958, as Madama Butterfly. Lafayette sang mainly in Europe at venues such as the Vienna State Opera, Bavarian State Opera in Munich, Hamburg State Opera, Nederlandse Opera in Amsterdam, Hessisches Staatstheater Wiesbaden, and in cities like Belgrade, The Hague, Dortmund, Düsseldorf, Glasgow, Graz, Hannover, Nashville, New York, Vienna, Wiesbaden, Zagreb, and at the Zürich Opera House. Despite her success in Europe, she was never able to establish herself in her home country.

== Selected discography ==
=== Giuseppe Verdi ===
- Aida in German: Leonora Lafayette (Aida), Josef Gostic (Radames), Georgine von Milinkovic (Amneris), Ferdinand Frantz (Amonasro), Gottlob Frick (Ramfis), Walter Berry (Il Re), Karl Ostertag (Messenger), Elisabeth Lindermeier (Temple Singer), Bavarian Radio Chorus and Orchestra, Clemens Krauss (Conductor), 1953 (2005 AfHO/Line Music GmbH - Cantus Classics 2005)

=== Frederick Delius ===
- Koanga : Lawrence Winters (Koanga), Leonora Lafayette (Palmyra), Stanford Robinson (Conductor), BBC Chorus & Orchestra

=== Giacomo Puccini ===
- Puccini Love Duets: Leonora Lafayette and Richard Lewis (Tenor) - Sir John Barbirolli (Conductor), The Hallé Orchestra, 1959 (Pye Records – CCL 30142 – LP), 1988 (Nixa - NIXCD 6005 - CD)

== Literature ==
- Karl-Josef Kutsch, Leo Riemens: Großes Sängerlexikon. Munich, 2000. Vol. 33 (Leonora Lafayette)
