= Ariadne auf Naxos =

1912 opera by Richard Strauss

- Opera by Richard Strauss
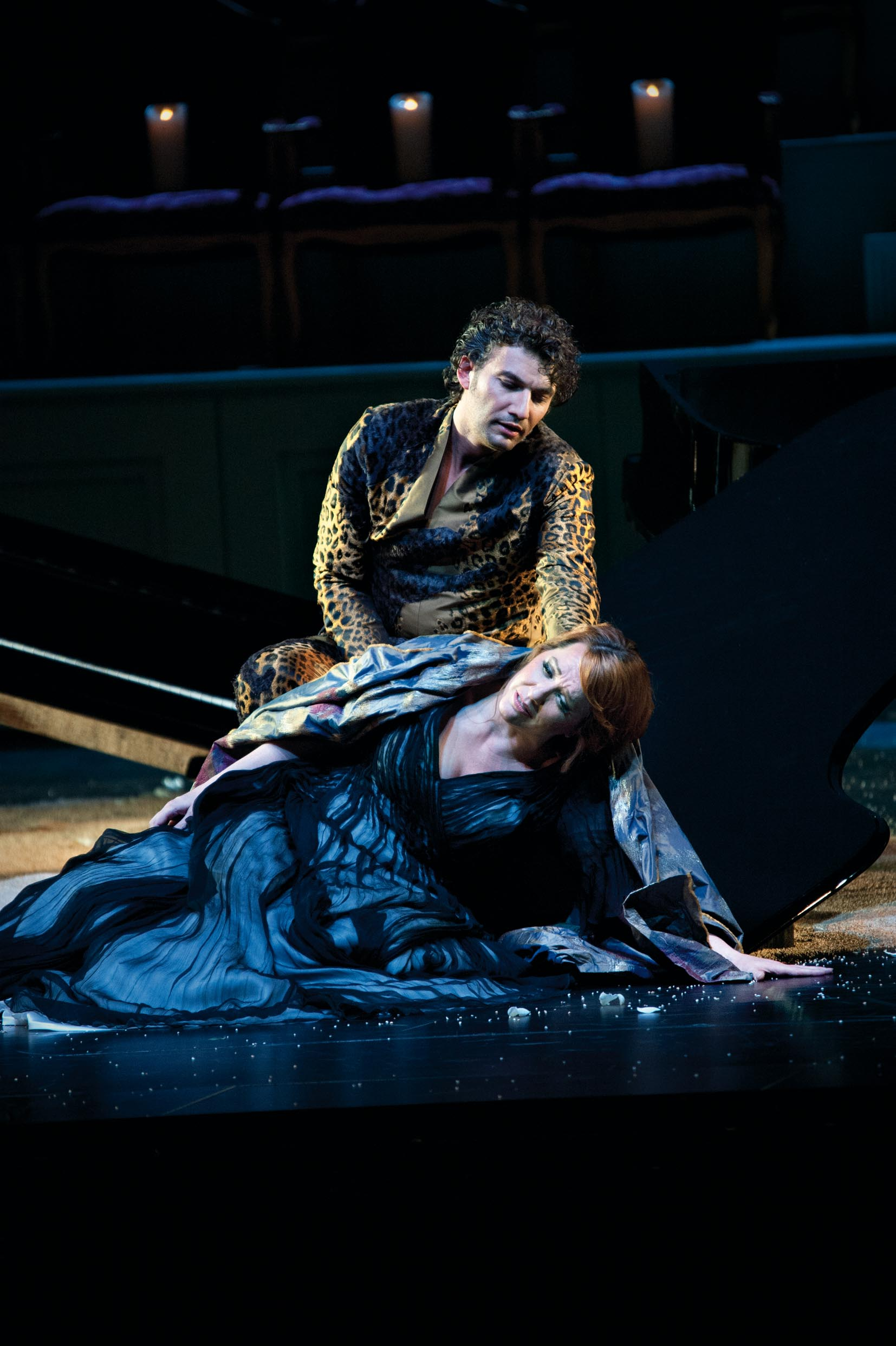
- Emily Magee as Ariadne and Jonas Kaufmann as Bacchus, Salzburg Festival 2012
- Librettist: Hugo von Hofmannsthal
- Language: German
- Premiere: 25 October 1912; Staatsoper Stuttgart

Ariadne auf Naxos (Ariadne on Naxos), Op. 60, is a 1912 opera by Richard Strauss with a German libretto by Hugo von Hofmannsthal. The opera's unusual combination of elements of low commedia dell'arte with those of high opera seria points up one of the work's principal themes: the competition between high and low art for the public's attention.

== First version (1912) ==
The opera was originally conceived as a 30-minute divertissement to be performed at the end of Hofmannsthal's adaptation of Molière's play Le Bourgeois gentilhomme. Besides the opera, Strauss provided incidental music to be performed during the play. In the end, the opera occupied ninety minutes, and the performance of play plus opera occupied over six hours. It was first performed at the Hoftheater Stuttgart on 25 October 1912, directed by Max Reinhardt. The combination of the play and opera proved to be unsatisfactory to the audience: those who had come to hear the opera resented having to wait until the play finished.

The opera-and-play version was produced in Zürich on 5 December 1912 and Prague on 7 December 1912. The Munich premiere followed on 30 January 1913 in the old Residenztheater, a venue which was inferior for the presentation of opera, both acoustically and due to lack of space for the musicians. Hofmannsthal overruled the conductor Bruno Walter's preference for the Hoftheater, on the grounds that the smaller theatre was more suitable for a work of this kind. The cast included the American Maude Fay as Ariadne, Otto Wolf as Bacchus, and Hermine Bosetti as Zerbinetta.

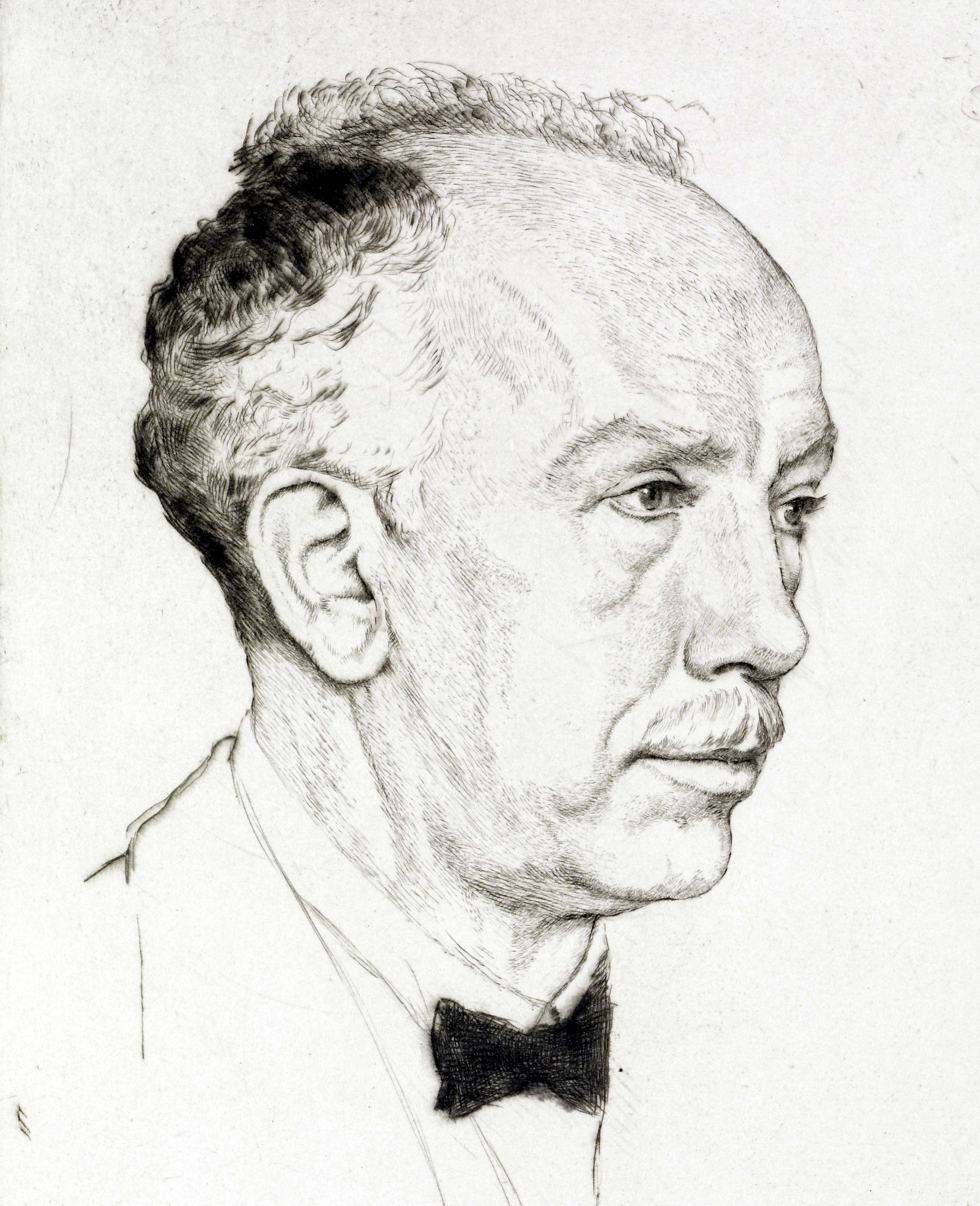
Richard Strauss, 1917, by Emil Orlík

Strauss, being a native son, had a close association with Munich and was held in high regard, but had to miss the performance as he was on a concert tour in Russia. The audience openly expressed its disapproval of the piece by hissing after the first act. For the succeeding performances, Walter introduced cuts and moved the production to the Hoftheater, and the attendance began to improve. The 1912 version was also produced in Berlin beginning on 27 February 1913 and in Amsterdam in 1914.

In London the early version was given eight times at His Majesty's Theatre beginning on 27 May 1913. The Hofmannsthal adaptation of Molière's play was presented in an English translation by W. Somerset Maugham under the title The Perfect Gentleman. The opera was sung in German with Eva von der Osten, Hermine Bosetti and Otakar Marák, conducted by Thomas Beecham. The reviewer in The Musical Times found the incidental music for the play to be more attractive than that for the opera, which nevertheless had "many strong emotional appeals." However, the orchestration of the opera was thought to be "peculiar", and in the finale, the love-making of Bacchus and Ariadne, tedious.

== Second version (1916) ==
1916 vocal score

After these initial performances, it became apparent that the work as it stood was impracticable: it required a company of actors as well as an opera company, was thus very expensive to mount, and its length was likely to be a problem for audiences. So in 1913, Hofmannsthal proposed to Strauss that the play should be replaced by a prologue, which would explain why the opera combines a serious classical story with a comedy performed by a commedia dell'arte group. He also moved the action from Paris to Vienna. Strauss was initially reluctant, but he composed the prologue (and modified some aspects of the opera) in 1916, and this revised version was first performed at the Vienna State Opera on 4 October of that year. This is the version that is normally staged today, although the original play-plus-opera has been occasionally performed, such as at the 1997 Edinburgh International Festival and at the 2012 Salzburg Festival.

The most important aria in either version is Zerbinetta's Großmächtige Prinzessin (High and mighty princess). Other important pieces of the opera are the arias of Ariadne Wo war ich? (Where was I?), Ein Schönes war (There was something beautiful) and Es gibt ein Reich (There is a realm). Also of note is the Composer's aria Sein wir wieder gut! (Let's be friends again).

=== Performance history of the second version ===
After its premiere in Vienna, the second version was first performed in Berlin on 1 November 1916, followed by Zürich on 28 January 1917 (in a production by the Mannheim Opera). It was first presented in Budapest on 19 April 1919 (in a Hungarian translation by Z. Harsányi), and in German in Graz on 12 March 1920, Amsterdam in January 1924, and London at the Royal Opera House on 27 May 1924 with Lotte Lehmann as Ariadne, Maria Ivogün as Zerbinetta (in her debut with the company), Elisabeth Schumann as the Composer, Karl Fischer-Niemann as Bacchus, and Carl Alwin conducting. Despite the stellar cast, the production was not successful, with one of the lowest box office returns of the season. It was repeated only once.

It was first performed in Italy in Turin at the Teatro di Torino on 7 December 1925 (in an Italian translation by Ottone Schanzer); in Sweden in Stockholm on 27 November 1926 (in Swedish); in Brussels on 17 March 1930 (in a French translation by P. Spaak); in Helsinki on 12 May 1931 (in a Finnish translation by A. af Enehjelm); in Rome at the Teatro Reale on 28 March 1935 (in German); Antwerp on 28 September 1935 (in Flemish); and in Paris at the Théâtre des Champs-Élysées on 10 September 1937 (in German).

The United States premiere of the opera was given in German by the Philadelphia Civic Opera Company at the Academy of Music on 1 November 1928. Conducted by Alexander Smallens, the cast included Alma Peterson as the Primadonna/Ariadne, Charlotte Boykin as Zerbinetta, Irene Williams as the Composer, and Judson House as the Tenor/Bacchus. It was presented by the Juilliard School in New York City in English in a translation by A. Kalisch on 5 December 1934 with a cast of students including Josephine Antoine as Zerbinetta, Mack Harrell as Truffaldino, and Risë Stevens as Dryad. The opera was performed for the first time in Canada by the New York City Opera on tour at the Montreal Festivals in 1946.

=== Productions in Vienna and Salzburg ===
The original production at the Vienna State Opera from 1916 was performed 93 times until 1934. Amongst others, the title role was sung by Claire Born, Fanny Cleve, Charlotte Dahmen, 33 times by Maria Jeritza, 25 times by Lotte Lehmann, Germaine Lubin, Maria Nemeth, Vera Schwarz, Lucie Weidt and Paula Windheuser.

In 1926, the opera was first presented at the Salzburg Festival, staged by Lothar Wallerstein in Viennese settings, twice conducted by Clemens Krauss and once by Richard Strauss himself. Lotte Lehmann was Salzburg's first Ariadne. Wallerstein was also the stage director of the second Viennese production in 1935, with settings by Oskar Strnad and costumes by Ladislaus Czettel. Josef Krips conducted. There were 38 performances until September 1943. Three months later a new production by Heinz Arnold was presented, with settings by Wilhelm Reinking and conducted by Karl Böhm. The cast featured Maria Reining as Ariadne, Max Lorenz as Bacchus, Alda Noni as Zerbinetta, Irmgard Seefried as composer, Paul Schöffler as Musiklehrer, Erich Kunz as Harlekin and Emmy Loose as Najade. Due to the war this production could only be shown seven times.

In 1947, Lothar Wallerstein, Robert Kautsky (stage settings and costumes) and Josef Krips presented a new production of the Vienna State Opera at the Theater an der Wien. The cast included Maria Reining, Max Lorenz, Irmgard Seefried, Elisabeth Schwarzkopf, Alfred Poell, Erich Kunz, Peter Klein, Marjan Rus, Dagmar Hermann, Elisabeth Rutgers and Emmy Loose. This production was performed 20 times, also with Maria Cebotari, Lisa Della Casa, Anny Konetzni and Hilde Zadek as Ariadne, and with Peter Anders, Josef Gostic, Julius Patzak and Helge Rosvaenge as Bacchus.

In 1954, the opera premiered at the Salzburg Festival Hall, staged by Josef Gielen with settings and costumes by Stefan Hlawa. Karl Böhm conducted the Vienna Philharmonic, Lisa Della Casa and Rudolf Schock sang Ariadne and Bacchus, Irmgard Seefried was the composer and Hilde Güden represented Zerbinetta. The production was repeated during the following summer, and then went to Vienna, where it premiered in 1956 with a new cast: Hilde Zadek and Josef Gostic as Ariadne and Bacchus, Christa Ludwig as composer and Erika Köth as Zerbinetta.

In 1964, Günther Rennert staged a new production in Salzburg, again conducted by Karl Böhm. Sena Jurinac (composer), Jess Thomas (Bacchus), Reri Grist (Zerbinetta) and Christa Ludwig (Ariadne) were the most prominent cast members, supported by Lisa Otto, Lucia Popp, Paul Schöffler, David Thaw and Gerhard Unger in smaller roles. This production was also repeated the following summer.

In 1976, again Karl Böhm conducted a new Vienna State Opera production, this time designed and staged by Filippo Sanjust, with Gundula Janowitz as Ariadne, James King als Bacchus, Agnes Baltsa as composer and Edita Gruberová as Zerbinetta, supported by Erich Kunz, Walter Berry, Heinz Zednik, Barry McDaniel, Kurt Equiluz, Axelle Gall and Sona Ghazarian. Janowitz sang the Ariadne 48 times in Vienna, followed by Lisa Della Casa (40 performances), Anni Konetzni (34), Maria Jeritza (33), Leonie Rysanek (30), Lotte Lehmann (25), Gwyneth Jones (14), Maria Reining and Anna Tomowa-Sintow (both 12 performances each), Christel Goltz and Claire Watson (both 10).

From 1979 to 1982, the Salzburg Festival showed a new staging by Dieter Dorn, settings and costumes by Jürgen Rose, again conducted by Karl Böhm, with a cast headed by Hildegard Behrens and James King, with Trudeliese Schmidt, Edita Gruberová, Walter Berry, Kurt Equiluz, Murray Dickie and Olivera Miljaković.

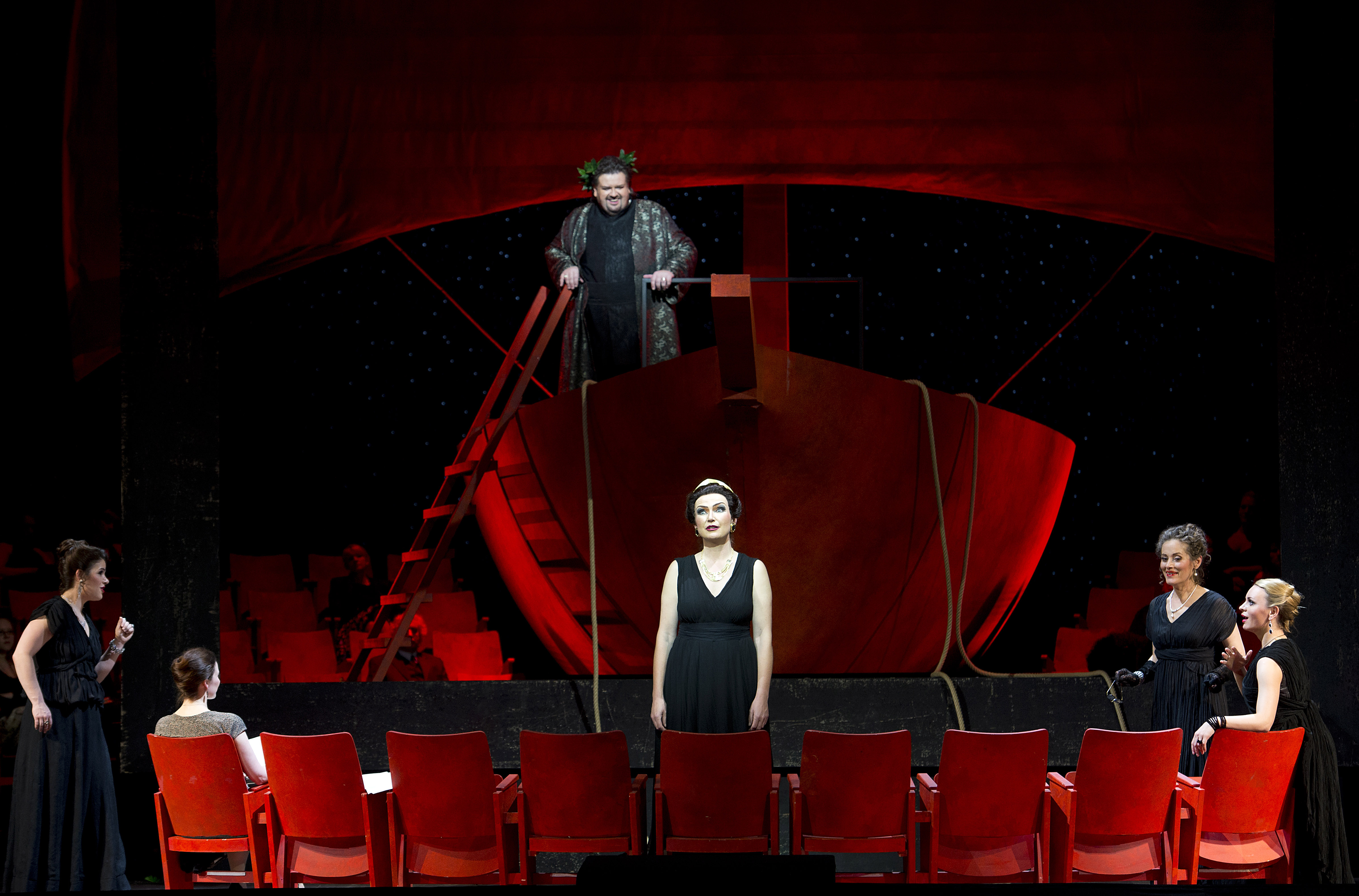
Anne Schwanewilms (Ariadne) and Johan Botha (Bacchus), Hamburg State Opera 2012

In 2012, the Salzburg Festival revived the first version, staged by Sven-Eric Bechtolf, and sung by Emily Magee, Elena Moșuc and Jonas Kaufmann, with conductor Daniel Harding.

=== Metropolitan Opera performances ===
The opera was first performed at the Metropolitan Opera in New York City on 29 December 1962 with Rysanek as Ariadne, Jess Thomas as Bacchus, Gianna D'Angelo as Zerbinetta, Kerstin Meyer as the Composer, Walter Cassel as the Music Master, and Karl Böhm conducting. As of 20 February 2010 it had been performed there a total of 88 times with revivals of the original production in 1963–4, 1970, 1976, 1979, 1984–5, and 1987–8, and a new production, directed by Elijah Moshinsky, first presented in 1993, followed by revivals in 1994, 1996–7, 2001, 2003, 2005, and 2010. The opera is a favorite of the Met's former music director James Levine, who conducted it a total of 44 times from 1976 to 2003. Interpreters of the role of Ariadne at the Met have included Jessye Norman (22 appearances from 1984 to 1993) and Deborah Voigt (17 appearances from 1993 to 2003). The role of the Composer has been sung there most often by a mezzo-soprano (at least 64 times), including, besides Kerstin Meyer, who sang the role 6 times, Tatiana Troyanos (19 appearances from 1976 to 1988), Susanne Mentzer (20 appearances from 1993 to 2003), Susan Graham (5 appearances in the fall of 2005), Sarah Connolly (5 appearances in the winter of 2010), and Joyce DiDonato (3 appearances in the spring of 2011). Soprano interpreters of the Composer have included Irmgard Seefried, Teresa Stratas (9 appearances: 4 in 1963–4; 1 in 1970; and 4 in the spring of 1994), Evelyn Lear (4 appearances in March 1970), and Maria Ewing (8 appearances in 1984–5). Singers of the coloratura soprano role of Zerbinetta have included, besides Gianna D'Angelo, who sang it 7 times, Roberta Peters (7 appearances in 1963–4), Kathleen Battle (9 appearances in 1987–8), and Natalie Dessay (12 appearances: 7 in the fall of 1997 and 5 in the spring of 2003).

== Roles ==
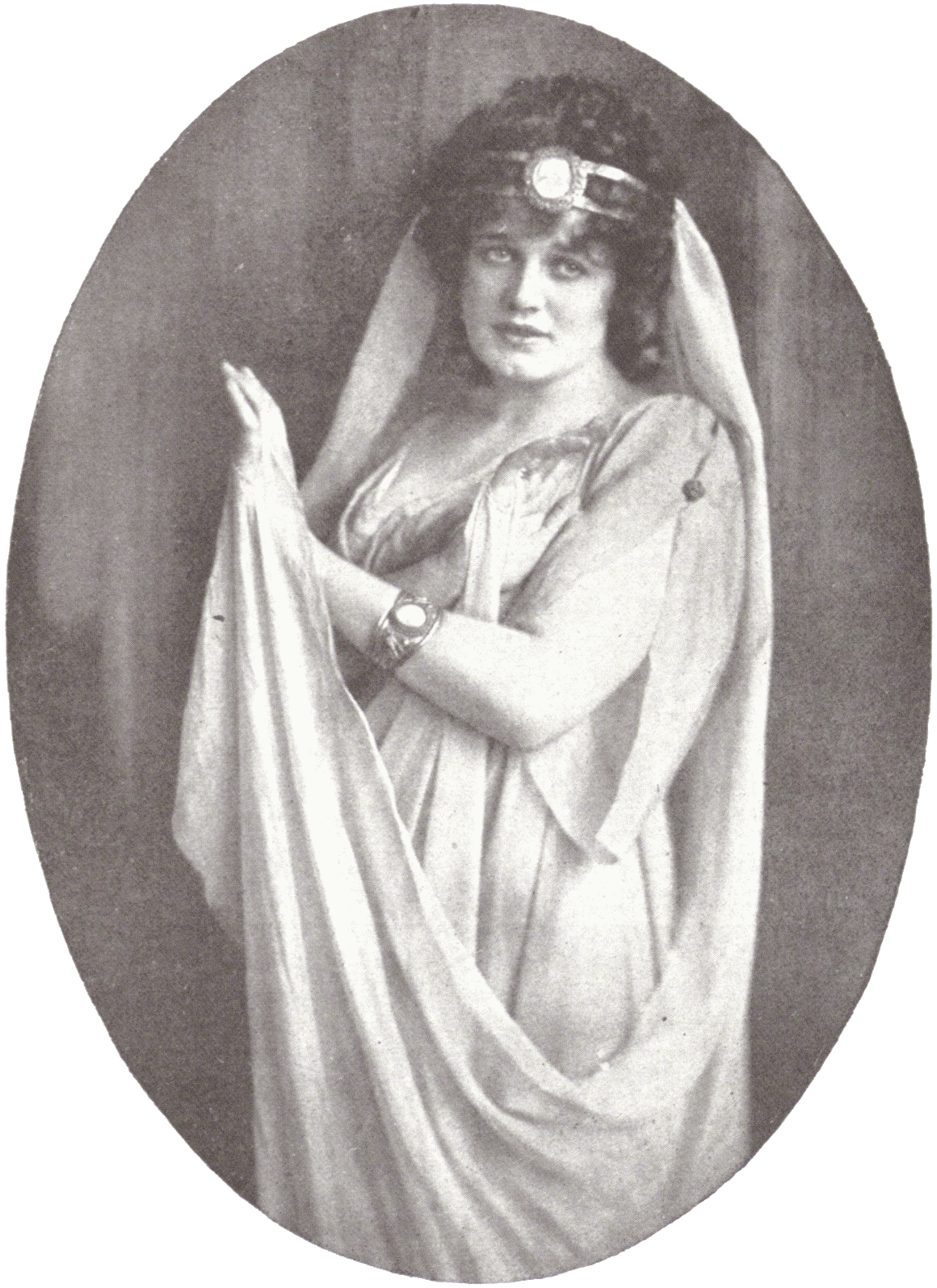
Maria Jeritza as Ariadne, 1917

Roles, voice types, premiere casts
Role		Voice type	Stuttgart premiere, 25 October 1912 (Conductor: Richard Strauss)	Vienna premiere, 4 October 1916 (revised version) (Conductor: Franz Schalk)
Prologue	Opera	Voice type	Stuttgart premiere, 25 October 1912 (Conductor: Richard Strauss)	Vienna premiere, 4 October 1916 (revised version) (Conductor: Franz Schalk)
The prima donna	Ariadne	dramatic soprano	Maria Jeritza	Maria Jeritza
The tenor	Bacchus	tenor	Herman Jadlowker	Béla von Környey
Zerbinetta		coloratura soprano	Margarethe Siems	Selma Kurz
Harlequin, a player		bass-baritone	Albin Swoboda Jr.	Hans Duhan
Scaramuccio, a player		tenor	Georg Maeder	Hermann Gallos
Truffaldino, a player		bass	Reinhold Fritz	Julius Betetto
Brighella, a player		tenor	Franz Schwerdt	Adolph Nemeth
The composer		soprano or mezzo-soprano (en travesti)		Lotte Lehmann, replacing Marie Gutheil-Schoder
His music master		baritone		Hans Duhan
The dancing master		tenor		Georg Maikl
A wigmaker		baritone		Gerhard Stehmann
A lackey		bass		Viktor Madin
An officer		tenor		Anton Arnold
The Major-Domo		spoken		Anton August Stoll
	Naiad, a nymph	soprano	M. Junker-Burchardt	Charlotte Dahmen
	Dryad, a nymph	contralto	Sigrid Onégin	Hermine Kittel
	Echo, a nymph	soubrette	Erna Ellmenreich	Carola Jovanovic
Servants

== Synopsis ==
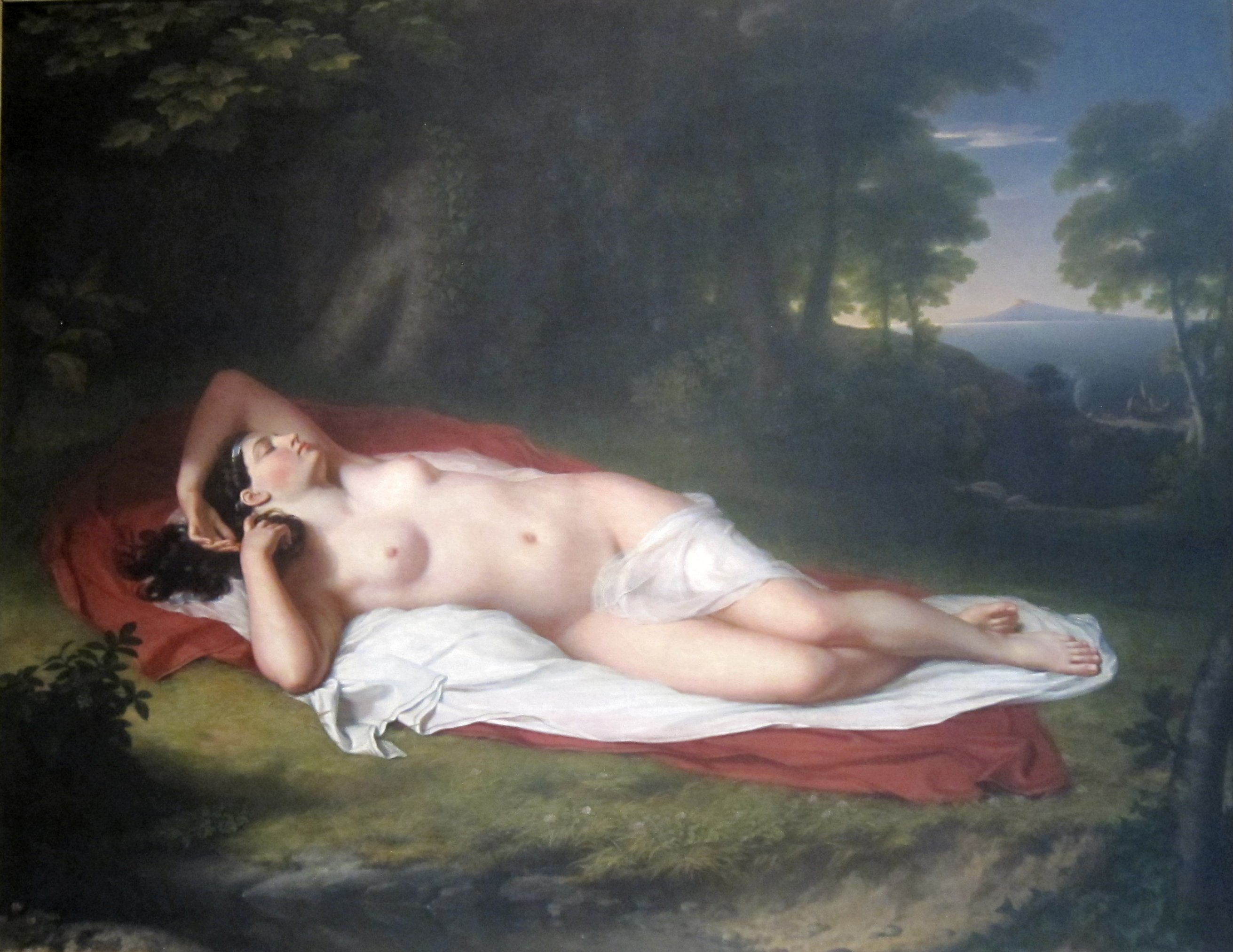
The Sleeping Ariadne in Naxos by John Vanderlyn

Ariadne auf Naxos is in two parts, called the Prologue and the Opera. The first part shows the backstage circumstances leading up to the second part, which is in fact an opera within an opera.

=== Prologue ===
At the home of the richest man in Vienna, preparations for an evening of music are under way. Two troupes of musicians and singers have arrived. One is a burlesque group, led by the saucy comedienne Zerbinetta. The other is an opera company, who will present an opera seria, Ariadne auf Naxos, the work of the Composer. Members of the two companies quarrel over which performance should be presented first. However, the preparations are thrown into confusion by an announcement by the Major-domo. The dinner for the assembled guests has run longer than planned. Therefore, both performances must take place at the same time as they have been ordered and paid for. The performances must not run one minute later than scheduled, despite the late start, since at nine o'clock there will be fireworks in the garden.

At first, the impetuous young Composer refuses to discuss any changes to his opera. But his teacher, the Music Master, points out that his pay depends on accepting the situation, and counsels him to be prudent, and Zerbinetta turns the full force of her charm on him, so he drops his objections. The cast of the opera seria intrigue against each other, each demanding that his arias be not cut while the other performers' parts are cut instead. A dancing master introduces Zerbinetta into the plot, which she understands from her very own perspective, and she gets ready for the performance. The Composer realizes what he has assented to, plunges into despair and storms out.

=== Opera ===
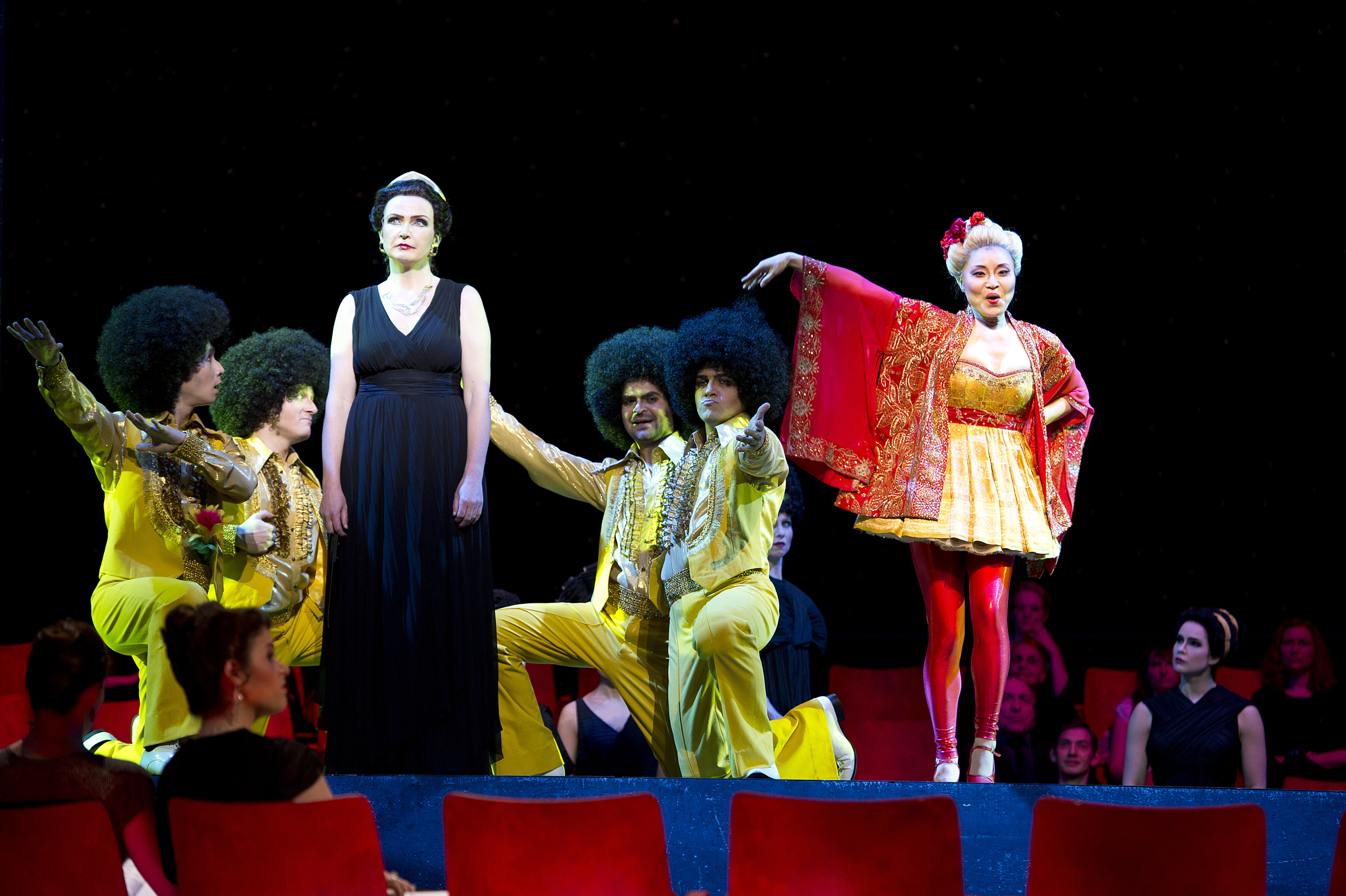
Ariadne auf Naxos at the Hamburg State Opera 2012: the thespians attempt to cheer up Ariadne

Ariadne is shown abandoned by her former lover, Theseus, on the desert island of Naxos, with no company other than the nymphs Naiad, Dryad, and Echo. Ariadne bewails her fate, mourns her lost love, and longs for death. Zerbinetta and her four companions from the burlesque group enter and attempt to cheer Ariadne by singing and dancing, but without success. In a sustained and dazzling piece of coloratura singing, Zerbinetta tells the Princess to let bygones be bygones and insists that the simplest way to get over a broken heart is to find another man. In a comic interlude, each of the clowns pursues Zerbinetta. Eventually, she chooses Harlequin, a baritone, and the two sing a love duet together while the other clowns express frustration and envy.

The nymphs announce the arrival of a stranger on the island. Ariadne thinks it is Hermes, the messenger of death, but it is the god Bacchus, who is fleeing from the sorceress Circe. At first they do not understand their mistaken identification of each other. Bacchus eventually falls in love with Ariadne, who agrees to follow him to the realm of death to search for Theseus. Bacchus promises to set her in the heavens as a constellation. Zerbinetta returns briefly to repeat her philosophy of love: when a new love arrives, one has no choice but to yield. The opera ends with a passionate duet sung by Ariadne and Bacchus.

== Instrumentation ==
The instrumentation of the work is unusual, as its complement of 'double woodwind' is accompanied by significantly reduced brass and string forces on the one hand, and by a generous percussion section on the other.

- Woodwind: 2 flutes, 2 piccolos, 2 oboes, 2 clarinets, bass clarinet, 2 bassoons
- Brass: 2 horns, trumpet, trombone
- Percussion: timpani, glockenspiel, tambourine, triangle, snare drum, 1 pair of crash cymbals, suspended cymbal
- Keyboards: harmonium, celesta, piano
- Strings: 6 violins, 4 violas, 4 cellos, 2 double basses, 2 harps

== Orchestral suite ==
Music was extracted from both versions of the opera by D. Wilson Ochoa in 2011 for a purely orchestral arrangement: Ariadne auf Naxos Symphony-Suite, published by Boosey & Hawkes and Schott Music. The 7 continuous sections combine into a 38-minute continuous suite that functions like a symphony: the Prologue introduces all the major musical themes, while each subsequent excerpt serves to "develop" each of those themes. Richard Strauss' original instrumentation was retained, except for having the 2nd Oboe now doubling on English horn, to be used in covering some vocal lines. This suite was premiered by Giancarlo Guerrero and the Nashville Symphony in October 2011, and recorded by JoAnn Falletta and the Buffalo Philharmonic Orchestra in 2016.

== Differences between 1912 and 1916 versions ==
1912 version	1916 version
Opera is preceded by Der Bürger als Edelmann, Hofmannsthal's translation of Molière's Le Bourgeois gentilhomme, with incidental music by Strauss; " Du Venus' Sohn" (You, son of Venus) is sung by an unnamed singer	Opera is preceded by prologue; the only music retained from Der Bürger als Edelmann is "Du Venus' Sohn" which is sung by the Composer
Jourdain interjects various spoken comments during the opera, particularly during the opening	no comments are made during the opera
Grossmächtige Prinzessin: The end of "Noch glaub' ich" (before "So war es mit Pagliazzo") continues with an instrumental repetition of the tune and ends on a B major chord	"Noch glaub' ich" cuts off and ends on an A major chord
Grossmächtige Prinzessin: "So war es mit Pagliazzo" begins in E major	"So war es mit Pagliazzo" begins in D major
Grossmächtige Prinzessin: "Als ein Gott kam jeder gegangen" begins in E major	"Als ein Gott kam jeder gegangen" begins in D major
Grossmächtige Prinzessin: After the 2nd repetition of "Als ein Gott" the aria continues to develop, including a long accompanied cadenza, ending in E major	The aria is cut down and ends in D major
After Zerbinetta's "Wie er feurig sich erniedert!" there is a short passage continuing the quartet for her, Brighella, Scaramuccio and Truffaldin beginning with the words "Wie der Druck den Druck erwidert"	After Zerbinetta's "Wie er feurig sich erniedert!" she continues "mach ich ihn auf diese neidig"
Before Zerbinetta and Harlekin sing together in octaves "Hand und Lippe, Mund und Hand!" there is a short passage of 8 measures during which Harlekin sings "Wie der Druck den Druck erwidert!"	From Zerbinetta's utterance of "Hand und Lippe" sing "ai, ai, ai, ai" and immediately goes into the duet between Zerbinetta and Harlekin
After Zerbinetta and Harlekin sing together in octaves "Hand und Lippe, Mund und Hand!" there are several pages continuing the quartet	After Zerbinetta and Harlekin sing together the quartet continues
After Ariadne sings "Die deiner lange harret, nimm sie dahin!" Zerbinetta has an aria "Prinzessin! Welchen Botenlohn hab ich verdient?"; Naiad, Dryad, and later Ariadne have interjections during the aria	After Ariadne's "Die deiner lange harret, nimm sie dahin!" she sees Theseus and cries out his name; there is no aria for Zerbinetta
After Zerbinetta's aria "Prinzessin! Welchen Botenlohn hab ich verdient?", Ariadne has a few lines invoking her mother; thereafter follows an orchestral passage, at the end of which she sees Theseus and cries his name	There is no corresponding passage
After the final duet between Ariadne and Bacchus, Zerbinetta returns with an aria combining motives from "Komm der neue Gott gegangen" and "So war's mit Pagliazzo und Mezzetin!"; Harlekin, Truffaldin, Brighella and Scaramuccio eventually join in	The opera ends after the Ariadne-Bacchus duet with a big orchestral conclusion
At the end of the Zerbinetta and company's final number, a lackey enters and tells Jourdain that the fireworks are beginning; he reflects on what people think of him and what he sees in himself; the work ends with music associated with Jourdain	There is no corresponding passage
