= Linda Watson (soprano) =

American operatic soprano (born 1956)

- Born: 1956 (age 69–70); San Francisco, California, U.S.
- Education: New England Conservatory; Vienna Academy of Music
- Occupations: Operatic dramatic soprano; Academic voice teacher
- Organizations: Deutsche Oper am Rhein; Music and Arts University of the City of Vienna
- Title: Kammersängerin
- Website: lindawatson.net

Linda Watson (born 1956) is an American dramatic soprano and academic voice teacher. She made her career based in Germany where she studied and began as a mezzo-soprano at the Theater Aachen. She has performed worldwide, including at the Vienna State Opera, La Scala, the Metropolitan Opera and the Bayreuth Festival. She focused on dramatic roles by Wagner, including Brünnhilde and Isolde, and Strauss, including Ariadne and the Dyer's Wife. She was awarded the title Kammersängerin in Germany in 2004 and in Austria in 2020.

== Life and work ==
Born in San Francisco, Watson was introduced to singing by her mother who conducted a church choir. She began voice training at age 15 in California, and then studied voice but also piano and conducting at the New England Conservatory in Boston, graduating in 1978. After working as an investment advisor for four years, she decided to pursue her voice studies, and continued at the Vienna Academy of Music, with teachers including Erik Werba, Waldemar Kmentt, and privately with Carol Blaickner-Mayo; and in Berlin with Hanne-Lore Kuhse. In Vienna, she performed in the ensemble in Bernstein's A Quiet Place, conducted by the composer. She made her stage debut in 1986 with the Wiener Vocal Ensemble.

Watson began her stage career as a mezzo-soprano at the Theater Aachen in 1992, followed by a guest contract at the Aalto Theatre in Essen in 1995, and then as an ensemble member at the Leipzig Opera, where she performed Wagnerian roles such as Brangäne in Tristan und Isolde and Venus in Tannhäuser. She became a member of the Deutsche Oper am Rhein in 1997. The same year, she first appeared as Venus at the Vienna State Opera, and a year later as Kundry in Parsifal at the Bayreuth Festival, conducted by Giuseppe Sinopoli. From 2000 to 2005, she portrayed Ortrud in Lohengrin at Bayreuth.

Watson's first dramatic soprano role was Sieglinde in Wagner's Die Walküre in Essen in 1995. During her engagement at the Deutsche Oper am Rhein, she was able to develop a large repertoire in the soprano range. There, she sang a number of Wagner roles (Ortrud, Kundry), Leonore in Beethoven's Fidelio, the Marschallin in Der Rosenkavalier, the title role in Ariadne auf Naxos and other Strauss roles. In the 2004–05 season, she made her role debut as Brünnhilde in Die Walküre in Tokyo. From 2006 to 2010, she sang all three Brünnhilde roles in Der Ring des Nibelungen at the Bayreuth Festival, and also performed these roles in the new production at the Vienna State Opera. She subsequently appeared as Brünnhilde at many of the world's great opera houses, including at the Teatro Colón in Buenos Aires, even in a nine-hour compilation of all the Ring in one day. She added more dramatic roles to her repertoire, including Isolde, Elektra, and both the Dyer's Wife and the Nurse in Die Frau ohne Schatten. The credibility of her portrayals and her vocal bravura led to engagements worldwide, in Munich, Berlin, Paris, Madrid and Barcelona, at La Scala in Milan, Florence, Bologna, Amsterdam, Los Angeles and at the Metropolitan Opera in New York City. She has worked with a conductors including Claudio Abbado, Bertrand de Billy, Daniele Gatti, Valery Gergiev, Hartmut Haenchen, James Levine, Zubin Mehta, Kent Nagano, Antonio Pappano, Esa-Pekka Salonen and Christian Thielemann. In 2013 and 2014, the singer returned to the ensemble of the Deutsche Oper am Rhein to perform as Marschallin, Elektra, Ariadne and Brünnhilde. At the Vienna State Opera, she was appointed Kammersängerin in January 2020. At La Scala in Milan, Linda Watson could be seen and heard in the 2020/21 season as Herodias in Salome.

Watson is also successful as a concert singer, performing in Verdi's Messa da Requiem, and also pieces of the Second Viennese School such as Alban Berg's Seven Early Songs and Schönberg's Gurre-Lieder. A special focus of her concert repertoire are the vocal works of Gustav Mahler, his Second and Third Symphonies, Das Lied von der Erde, Kindertotenlieder, Lieder eines fahrenden Gesellen and Rückert Lieder. She made numerous recordings and recordings, especially as Brünnhilde. In an interview, she said that she was most proud of the Ring recording from Vienna that was nominated for a Grammy Award.

Watson is a professor of voice at the Music and Arts University of the City of Vienna.

== Roles ==
Beethoven:

- Leonore in Fidelio

Prokofiev:

- Babulenka in The Gambler

Puccini:

- Title role in Turandot

Strauss:

- Herodias in Salome
- Title role in Elektra
- Marschallin im Der Rosenkavalier
- Title role in Ariadne auf Naxos
- Dyer's Wife and Nurse in Die Frau ohne Schatten

Wagner:

- Elisabeth and Venus in Tannhäuser
- Ortrud in Lohengrin
- Sieglinde and Brünnhilde in Die Walküre
- Brünnhilde in Siegfried
- Brünnhilde in Götterdämmerung
- Brangäne and Isolde in Tristan und Isolde
- Kundry in Parsifal

== Awards ==
- 2004: German Kammersängerin
- 2014: Nomination for a Grammy Award for Brünnhilde in Der Ring des Nibelungen
- 2020: Austrian Kammersängerin
