= Dantons Tod (opera) =

Opera by Gottfried von Einem

- Opera by Gottfried von Einem
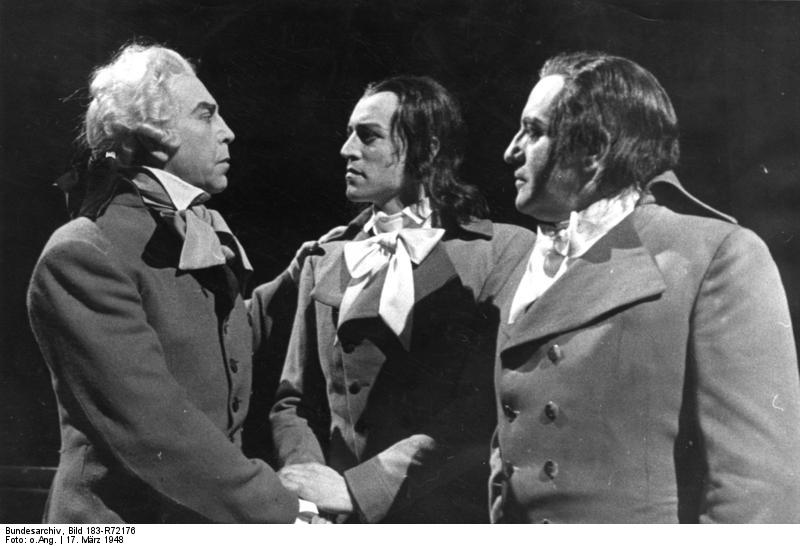
- A scene in the first performance in Germany at the Hamburg State Opera in 1948
- Translation: Dantons Death
- Librettist: Boris Blacher; von Einem
- Language: German
- Based on: Danton's Death by Georg Büchner
- Premiere: 6 August 1947; Salzburg Festival

Dantons Tod (German for Danton's Death) is an opera by Gottfried von Einem to a libretto by Boris Blacher and Gottfried von Einem after Georg Büchner's 1835 play of the same name. Its first performance took place in Salzburg on 6 August 1947. It was revised in 1955.

The successful premiere of Gottfried von Einem's opera Dantons Tod at the 1947 Salzburg Festival and its quick staging by European houses were due to more than the strong drama of Einem's score. This was a first step toward the rehabilitation of German musicians after World War II; an opera by a young Austrian composer who had not collaborated in the former regime's cultural policies. Dantons Tod dramatizes legalized governmental terror, a plague which the world at the time realized had not been eradicated with the end of the war.

== Roles ==
Roles, voice types, premiere cast
Role	Voice type	Premiere cast 6 August 1947 Conductor: Ferenc Fricsay
Georges Danton	baritone	Paul Schöffler
Camille Desmoulins	tenor	Julius Patzak
Lucile	soprano	Maria Cebotari
Hérault de Séchelles	tenor	Peter Klein
Robespierre	tenor	Josef Witt
Saint-Just	bass	Ludwig Weber
Simon	bass	Georg Hann
Julie	mezzo-soprano	Gisela Thury
Hermann	bass	Herbert Alsen
Simon's wife	contralto	Rosette Anday
Young man	tenor	Erwin Nowaro
Two executioners	tenor, bass	William Wernigk, Wilhelm Felden
Woman	soprano	Trude Ballasch
Chorus (SATB)

== Synopsis ==
Dantons Tod was adapted from Georg Büchner's play by von Einem and his teacher, composer Boris Blacher. The protagonist is Georges Danton, a leader in the French government during the Revolution. When he turned against Robespierre's tactics—including terror—he was guillotined in April 1794. The opera's first act establishes Danton's confrontation with Robespierre. In the first scene Danton and Camille Desmoulins express their desire for an end of the daily executions to a group of their friends playing cards. Scene two introduces the volatile crowd. Robespierre enters and in an aria sways the crowd and promises more executions. Danton confronts him. After Danton leaves, Robespierre and his colleague Saint-Just decide that he and Camille must be killed. In the last scene of the act Danton announces to Camille and his wife Lucile that he is to be arrested, but he refuses to flee.

Act 2 depicts Danton's trial and death. Two scenes before the Revolutionary Tribunal are separated by one with Danton and Camille in prison. Lucile comes to see Camille; she has lost her reason. In the trial scenes the crowd swings between demanding Danton's death and falling under the spell of his eloquent oratory. At the end, in the Place de la Révolution, the condemned prisoners sing "La Marseillaise" in counterpoint to the crowd dancing the Carmagnole. Danton and Camille are guillotined. After the crowd disperses, Lucile enters and sits on the steps of the guillotine. She cries Es lebe der Konig (Long live the king) and is arrested as the curtain falls.

Von Einem revised the score slightly after the premiere, replacing an orchestral prelude with the chords that now open the opera, cutting an orchestral passage after Danton's death, and revising the final scene with Lucile.

== Recordings ==
- Paul Schöffler as Danton, Julius Patzak as Desmoulins and Maria Cebotari as Lucile. This is a live recording taken from the premiere in Salzburg on August 6, 1947 with the Vienna Philharmonic and Vienna State Opera Chorus conducted by Ferenc Fricsay. A recording is available on Allegro Corporation's Opera D'Oro label.
- Theo Adam, Werner Hollweg, Horst Hiestermann, Krisztina Laki, ORF Chorus and Orchestra, Lothar Zagrosek Orfeo 1983
