= Georgine von Milinkovič =

Georgine von Milinkovič (July 7, 1913, Prague - February 26, 1986, Munich) was a Croatian operatic mezzo-soprano, particularly associated with Wagner and Strauss roles.

After vocal studies in Zagreb and Vienna, she sang at the Zurich Opera from 1937 to 1940, then in Hilversum and later in Prague from 1945 until 1948. She made her debut at the Munich State Opera and the Vienna State Opera in 1948, where the major part of her career was to take place. She also appeared at the Salzburg Festival, where she created the role of Alkmene in Richard Strauss's Die Liebe der Danae, in 1952.

She sang at the Bayreuth Festival from 1954, in roles such as Fricka, Magdalene, Grimgerde, Second Nom, etc.

She made guest appearances at the Edinburgh Festival and the Holland Festival, and the Royal Opera House in London.

She was also admired in Strauss's Die schweigsame Frau and Elektra (as Clytemnestra), as well as in Verdi roles such as Eboli, Amneris, and Bizet's Carmen.

== Selected recording ==
- Georges Bizet - Carmen - Georgine von Milinkovič, Rudolf Schock, Elisabeth Grümmer, James Pease - Bavarian Radio Chorus and Orchestra, Eugen Jochum - (1954)
- Richard Strauss - Der Rosenkavalier - Viorica Ursuleac, Georgine von Milinkovic, Adele Kern, Ludwig Weber, and Georg Hann; conductor: Clemens Krauss, Symphonieorchester des Bayerischen Rundfunks, complete recording in Munich, 1942, Preiser Records.
- Giuseppe Verdi - Aida in German - Leonora Lafayette (Aida), Josef Gostic (Radames), Georgine von Milinkovic (Amneris), Ferdinand Frantz (Amonasro), Gottlob Frick (Ramfis), Walter Berry (The King), Karl Ostertag (Messenger), Elisabeth Lindermeier (Priestess), Choir and Orchestra of the Bavarian Radio Munich, conducted by Clemens Krauss, 1953 (2005 AfHO/Line Music GmbH - Cantus Classics 2005).

== Sources ==
- Operissimo.com
