= Ain Anger =

Estonian opera bass

Ain Anger (born 17 June 1971) is an Estonian opera bass.

== Life and career ==
Born in Kihelkonna, Anger grew up on the Estonian island Saaremaa. He commenced his vocal training at Tallinn's Academy of Music in 1996. After initial professional experience in Estonia, he broadened his repertoire with Leipzig Opera before joining the Ensemble of the Vienna State Opera in the 2004/2005 season. Since his house debut as Monterone (Rigoletto) he has sung over 40 roles on Vienna's main stage including Sarastro (Die Zauberflöte), Philippe II (Don Carlos), Sparafucile (Rigoletto), Titurel (Parsifal), Daland (Der fliegende Holländer), Pogner (Die Meistersinger von Nürnberg), Varlaam (Boris Godunov), Padre Guardiano (La forza del destino), Heinrich (Lohengrin), Zaccaria (Nabucco), Fiesco (Simone Boccanegra), Hermann (Tannhäuser) and Hunding (Die Walküre). Guest engagements have taken Anger to Berlin, Munich, Paris and Tokyo (on tour with the Vienna State Opera) as well as to the Savonlinna, Helsinki, Bergen and Lucerne festivals.

Anger made his Bayreuth Festival debut in 2009 as Fafner in both Das Rheingold and Siegfried with Christian Thielemann, and it was under Lorin Maazel that he made his US debut in 2002 in the title part of Rodion Shchedrin's The Enchanted Wanderer with the New York Philharmonic. Equally at home on the concert platform, recent seasons have seen Anger's debut with the San Francisco Symphony in Beethoven's Missa Solemnis (under Michael Tilson Thomas) and in Verdi's Requiem (James Conlon) as well as Orest in Strauss' Elektra with the Philadelphia Orchestra (Charles Dutoit) and Mahler's Symphony No. 8 with the Bavarian Radio Symphony Orchestra (Mariss Jansons). Anger has also appeared as guest soloist with orchestras in New York, Cleveland, Saint Louis, Stockholm and Tokyo and has worked with renowned conductors including Lorin Maazel, Christian Thielemann, Seiji Ozawa, Zubin Mehta, Riccardo Muti and Esa-Pekka Salonen. 2013 he made his debut at Milan's Scala.

Anger will make his Edinburgh International Festival debut in August 2019 in Wagner's Götterdämmerung with the Royal Scottish National Orchestra under Sir Andrew Davis.

2013 he was rewarded the Order of the White Star. On 12 June 2020 he was rewarded in Vienna with the title Kammersänger.

In 2025, Anger performed a highly appreciated (by both critique and audience) role of Hagen in Pierre Audi's production of Götterdämmerung in Brussel's Theatre Royal de la Monnaie, setting himself high in the rank of the best-acclaimed Wagnerian basses.
