= Paul Schöffler =

German opera singer

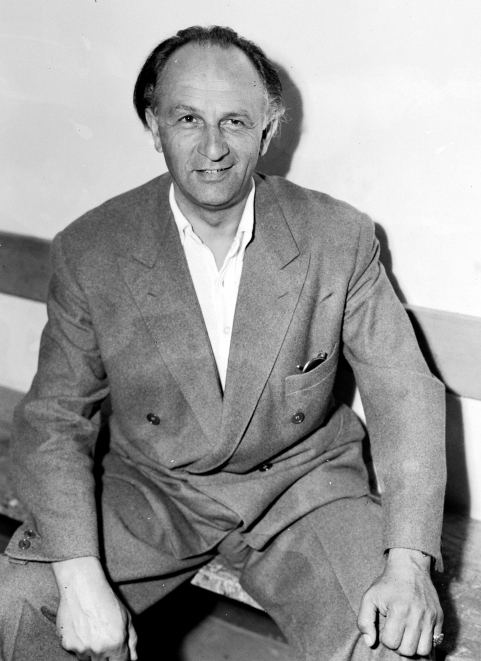
Paul Schöffler, German operatic baritone, in the wardrobe during the Salzburg Festival 1947.

Paul Schöffler (15 September 1897 – 21 November 1977) was a German operatic baritone, particularly associated with Mozart, Wagner, and Strauss roles.

Born in Dresden, he studied at the Music Conservatory there with Rudolf Schmalmauer and Waldemar Staegemann, and later in Milan with the Italian baritone Mario Sammarco. He was a member of the Semperoper in Dresden from 1925 to 1937, and then joined the Vienna State Opera. He was also a regular at the Bayreuth Festival and the Salzburg Festival, establishing himself in roles such as Figaro, Don Giovanni, Alfonso, The Speaker of the Temple, Pizarro, Holländer, Wolfram, Kurwenal, Hans Sachs, Wotan, Amfortas, Orest, and Barak. He took part in the creation of Gottfried von Einem's Dantons Tod in 1947, and Richard Strauss's Die Liebe der Danae in 1952, both in Salzburg.

He made guest appearances at the Royal Opera House in London, the Paris Opéra, the Aix-en-Provence Festival, La Scala in Milan, the Teatro Colón in Buenos Aires, the Metropolitan Opera in New York, also appearing in San Francisco and Chicago.

He also enjoyed considerable success in a few Italian roles notably Iago and Scarpia, and eventually moved to character roles (Music Teacher, Antonio), singing well into his 70s.

Paul Schöffler died in Amersham, England, aged 80.

== Sources ==
- Operissimo.com
