= Gré Brouwenstijn =

Dutch soprano singer

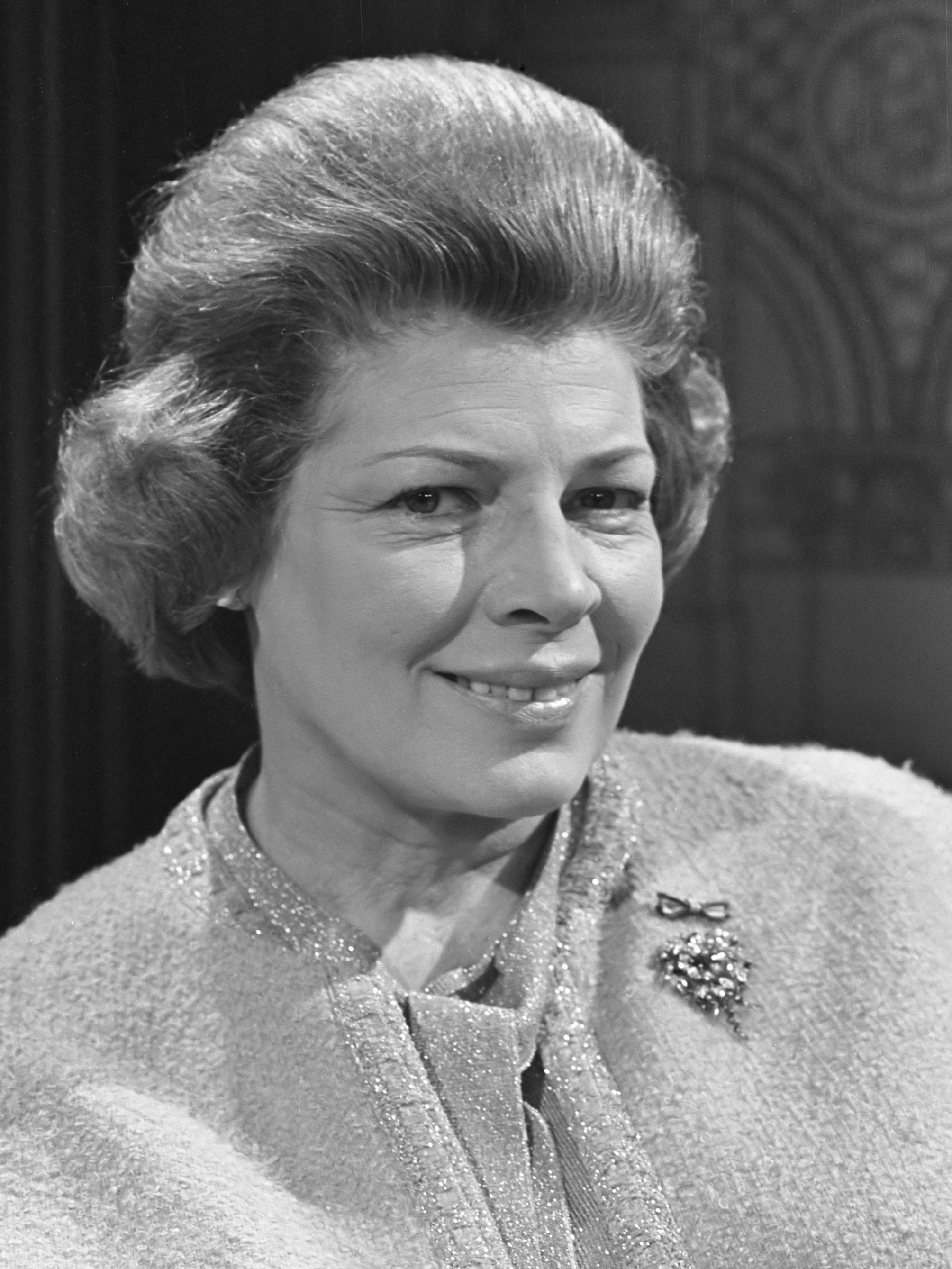
Gré Brouwenstijn (1968)

Gré Brouwenstijn (born Gerda Demphina: 26 August 1915 in Den Helder – 14 December 1999 in Amsterdam) was a Dutch soprano singer whose stage career spanned from the early 1940s to the mid-1970s.

== Career ==
She studied voice at the Amsterdam Muzieklyceum, with Jaap Stroomenbergh, Boris Pelsky and Ruth Horna. She made her operatic début in 1940 as the First Lady in The Magic Flute. Brouwenstijn then became a member of the Hilversum Radio Choir, later performing as a soloist in operatic broadcasts. In 1946, she joined the Netherlands Opera, where she made her debut as Giulietta in Les contes d'Hoffmann.

In 1949, Brouwenstijn made her debut at the Holland Festival as Leonora in Il Trovatore, the beginning of a long association. In subsequent years, she sang Reiza (Oberon), Jenůfa, Amelia, Donna Anna, Desdemona, the Countess, Tatyana, Leonora (La forza del destino), Senta, Iphigénie (Iphigénie en Tauride), and Leonore (Fidelio) at the Festival.

Brouwenstijn was above all associated with the role of Leonore in Beethoven's Fidelio. Considered one of the finest Leonores of her time, she performed the role to great acclaim at the Vienna State Opera, the Paris Opera, Stuttgart, Berlin, Amsterdam, Buenos Aires, London, and Glyndebourne.

In 1951, Brouwenstijn made her debut at the Royal Opera House, Covent Garden as Aida (in English), conducted by Sir John Barbirolli. Her Berlin debut in 1954 caused "something of a sensation"; the critic praised her "phrasing in Italian opera". In 1955, under Rafael Kubelík, she sang Desdemona. In 1958, she sang Elisabetta in a famous production of Don Carlos designed by Luchino Visconti and conducted by Carlo Maria Giulini. In 1958 she sang Leonore at the Teatro Colón in a production of Fidelio conducted by Thomas Beecham.

From 1954 to 1956, she appeared at Bayreuth, as Elisabeth, Freia, Sieglinde, Gutrune and Eva. Two Wagnerian roles she performed elsewhere, Senta and Elsa, she never performed there, however, due to a breach in 1957 with the Wagner family.

Brouwenstijn's roles at La Monnaie in Brussels were Chrysothemis in Elektra, the Marschallin in Der Rosenkavalier, Elisabeth in Tannhäuser and Sieglinde in Die Walküre. At the Paris Opera she appeared as Leonore in Fidelio in 1955 and Elisabeth in Don Carlos in 1960. In 1959, she made her American debut as Jenůfa at the Lyric Opera of Chicago.

She made her farewell appearance singing Leonore, with the Netherlands Opera in 1971.

Brouwenstijn was married twice; from 1948 to 1953 to tenor Jan van Mantgem, and from 1954 until her death to former tennis player and TV doctor Hans van Swol. Gré Brouwenstijn died in 1999 at age 84 in Amsterdam and was buried at Zorgvlied cemetery.

== Recording ==
Of published opera recordings, many are taken from live performances; her studio recordings include Un ballo in maschera (excerpts), Der Freischütz (excerpts), Tiefland and Die Walküre, beside Beethoven's 9th Symphony with the Berlin Philharmonic Orchestra under André Cluytens. Tove in Gurre-Lieder is preserved as part of an Edinburgh performance in 1961 under Leopold Stokowski.

== Quote ==
Dutch music critic Paul Korenhof wrote of Brouwenstijn:

Her gifts were even more evident in seemingly passive roles such as Verdi’s two Leonoras (Il Trovatore and La Forza del destino) and Desdemona. When Gré Brouwenstijn sang these roles, she was more than a soprano who sang her arias beautifully but was otherwise little more than a decorative element in the drama being presented by the tenor and baritone. As a contemporary of Callas, Olivero, Rysanek, Varnay and Mödl and influenced by many great conductors and directors of the fifties, she realized that beautiful singing alone did not make an opera, but that the singing must emanate from the character being portrayed.
