= Stig Fogh Andersen =

Danish operatic tenor

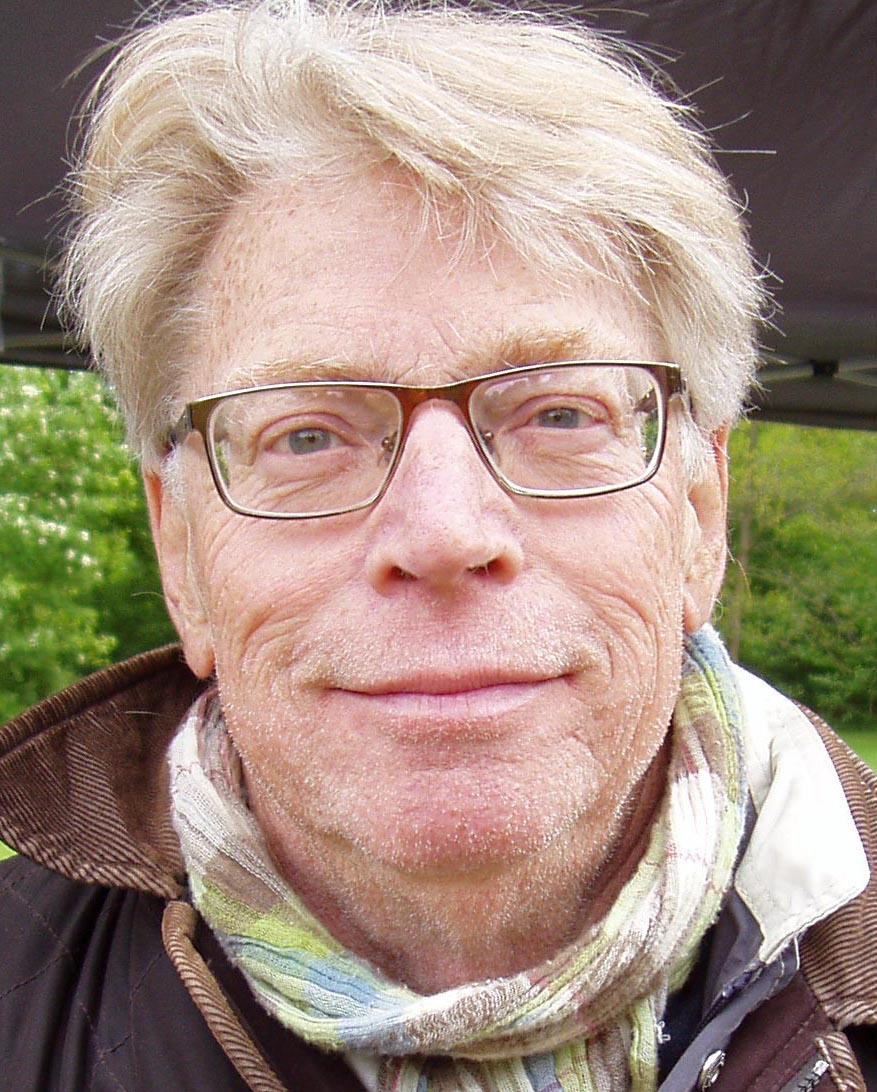
Sir Stig Fogh Andersen

Sir Stig Fogh Andersen (February 24, 1950 in Hørsholm) is a Danish operatic tenor. He is considered one of the most famous Wagner-tenors, "one of the leading Siegfrieds in the world today". He was married to Tina Kiberg, who is also an opera singer. He now lives in Jutland.
