= Ladislaus Czettel =

Hungarian costume designer

Ladislaus Czettel (born Fülop László Donath; 12 March 1895 – 5 March 1949) was a Hungarian fashion designer, draughtsman and costume designer for stage and film.

== Life ==
Born in Budapest, Czettel began working as a fashion designer shortly after the end of the First World War. Early activities took him from Budapest to Paris and Vienna. There he made his first contacts as a costume designer (and sketch artist) in the theatre, especially in cabarets and vaudeville. Along the way, Ladislaus Czettel also designed costumes for the first time for (Austrian) films (Miss Hobbs, Das Spielzeug von Paris). From 1923 onwards, he appeared as a costume designer for revues at the Viennese Ronacher and Berlin's Theater des Westens venues. As artistic advisor to the Deutsches Theater in Berlin (1931/32) and its pendant in Munich (1932/33), he also collaborated with Max Reinhardt, whose production of Jacques Offenbach's La belle Hélène he designed with costumes at Berlin's Theater am Kurfürstendamm in 1931. In 1930, Czettel was also involved in the costume designs for the UFA film Burglars with Lilian Harvey and Willy Fritsch.

Ostracised as a Jew in Germany in 1933, Czettel returned to Austria and continued his theatre activities in Vienna (Theater in der Josefstadt, Vienna State Opera, Burgtheater and the Salzburg Festival until 1937. He also taught as a professor at Vienna's Max Reinhardt Seminar from 1935 to 1938. In 1935, he was commissioned once again for a film, of which an Italian version was also produced.

As a result of the Anschluss in March 1938, Czettel fled abroad to the West. In London, where he had already designed at the London Palladium theatre in 1937, he still designed the costumes for Gabriel Pascal's lavish film version of George Bernard Shaw's Pygmalion in 1938. In mid-1938, Czettel travelled on to the US. There he worked again as a teacher, this time at the Dramatic Workshop of New School for Social Research. At Broadway in New York, Czettel designed the costumes for operettas such as Die Fledermaus (alias Rosalinda, 1942) and Helen Goes to Troy (1944). One week before his 54th birthday, Czettel committed suicide.

== Filmography ==
- 1921: Miss Hobbs
- 1925: Das Spielzeug von Paris
- 1930: Burglars
- 1935: Tagebuch der Geliebten
- 1938: Pygmalion
