= Elisabeth Lindermeier =

German operatic soprano (1923–1998)

- Born: 17 February 1923; Munich, Germany
- Died: 19 February 1998 (aged 75); Munich, Germany
- Other names: Elisabeth Lindermeier-Kempe
- Education: Musikhochschule München
- Occupation: Operatic soprano
- Organizations: Bavarian State Opera
- Spouse: Rudolf Kempe

Elisabeth Lindermeier (also Elisabeth Kempe-Lindermeier; 17 February 1923 – 19 February 1998) was a German operatic soprano. A member of the Bavarian State Opera, she performed internationally, including at the Royal Opera House in London in the English premiere of Die Liebe der Danae by Richard Strauss. She appeared in recordings and films.

== Life and career ==
Born in Munich on 17 February 1923, Lindermeier initially worked as a bank clerk. She began her vocal studies at the Musikhochschule München. Supported by Kammersänger Hans Hotter, she joined the ensemble of the Prinzregententheater. In 1946, she made her debut at the Bavarian State Opera as Sandmännchen in Humperdinck's Hänsel und Gretel. She remained a member of the ensemble until 1958 and appeared as a guest until 1962.

Internationally, Lindermeier first appeared at the Zürich Opera House in 1950 as Susanna in Mozart's Le nozze di Figaro; she also appeared in 1953 as Leda in the Swiss premiere of Die Liebe der Danae by Richard Strauss, and in 1955 as Pamina in Mozart's Die Zauberflöte. She performed as Wellgunde and the Second Norne in Wagner's Der Ring des Nibelungen in Rome in 1953, also singing Wellgunde at the Maggio Musicale Fiorentino in 1956.

At the Royal Opera House in London, Lindermeier appeared in 1953 as Europa in the English premiere of Die Liebe der Danae, alongside Leonie Rysanek in the title role. She appeared there as Freia and Gutrune in Der Ring des Nibelungen, recorded in 1957. The performances were conducted by Rudolf Kempe, with Hans Hotter as Wotan, Birgit Nilsson as Brünnhilde, Wolfgang Windgassen as Siegfried, and Joan Sutherland as Wellgunde. In 1958 she took part in a staged performance at the Royal Opera House of Handel's oratorio Saul. In 1956, she appeared as Leonora in Verdi's Il trovatore at both the Staatsoper Berlin and the Staatsoper Dresden. The same year, she performed as Donna Elvira in Mozart's Don Giovanni at the Glyndebourne Festival.

Lindermeier was married to the conductor Rudolf Kempe. She ended her career in favour of her husband's at the end of the 1960s. She died in Munich on 19 February 1998.

== Recordings ==
Lindermeier made recordings with orchestras such as the Berliner Philharmoniker, Bayerisches Staatsorchester and WDR Sinfonieorchester Köln. Her recordings are held by the German National Library, including:

- 1954: Hänsel und Gretel – Münchner Philharmoniker conducted by Fritz Lehmann, Boys' choir of the Wittelsbacher Gymnasium Munich, Choir of the Bayerischer Rundfunk, with Hänsel – Gisela Litz, Gretel – Rita Streich, Peter – Horst Günter, Gertrud – Marianne Schech, Knusperhexe – Res Fischer, Sandmännchen – Elisabeth Lindermeier, Taumännchen – Bruno Brückmann (complete recording, DG 449 378-2)
- 1954: Madama Butterfly – Symphonieorchester des Bayerischen Rundfunks conducted by Rudolf Alberth, Elisabeth Lindermeier, Richard Holm, Hertha Töpper, Marcel Cordes, Label: Line (2008)
- 1956: Mahler – Symphony No. 4 – Symphonieorchester des Bayerischen Rundfunks conducted by Otto Klemperer, Elisabeth Lindermeier – soprano, Label: Golden Melodram (2007)
- 1957: Der Ring des Nibelungen – complete live recording, Orchestra of the Royal Opera House, Rudolf Kempe Label: Testament, reissued 2008
- 1957: Fidelio, as Marzelline, with Leonie Rysanek as Leonore, Ferdinand Frantz as Jacquino, Ludwig Weber as Rocco, Orchestra Sinfonica di Roma della RAI conducted by Eugen Jochum

== Filmography ==
- The Falling Star, playing a singer, Germany 1950, director: Harald Braun
- Die Kluge, television film, Germany 1955, director: Gustav Rudolf Sellner
