= James Rutherford (baritone) =

British bass-baritone opera singer (born 1972)

James Duncan Montrose Rutherford (born 29 May 1972) is a British bass-baritone opera singer who has performed leading roles with UK and other European and North American opera companies. He also appears as a soloist in concert and oratorio. In 1997 he won second prize in the Kathleen Ferrier Awards and in 2006 won the Seattle Opera International Wagner Competition.

Rutherford was born in Norwich, England. After completing his studies in theology at Durham University he studied singing at the Royal College of Music and the National Opera Studio. He made his stage debut in September 1999 singing the title role of Verdi's Falstaff with the British Youth Opera at London's Peacock Theatre and was engaged by Opera North for his company debut the following Spring.

Since 2009 he has appeared frequently with Graz Opera where he made his role debut as Hans Sachs in Die Meistersinger von Nürnberg and at Frankfurt Opera where he made his role debut as Wotan in Der Ring des Nibelungen. He also sang Hans Sachs for his Bayreuth Festival debut in 2010 and his return in 2011.

== Recordings ==
Rutherford has released two solo recordings on the BIS Records label:

- Most Grand To Die (2012) – James Rutherford (baritone), Eugene Asti (pianist).
- Rutherford Sings Wagner (2014) – James Rutherford (baritone), Bergen Philharmonic Orchestra, Andrew Litton, (conductor).
