= Die Liebe der Danae =

1952 opera by Richard Strauss

- Opera by Richard Strauss
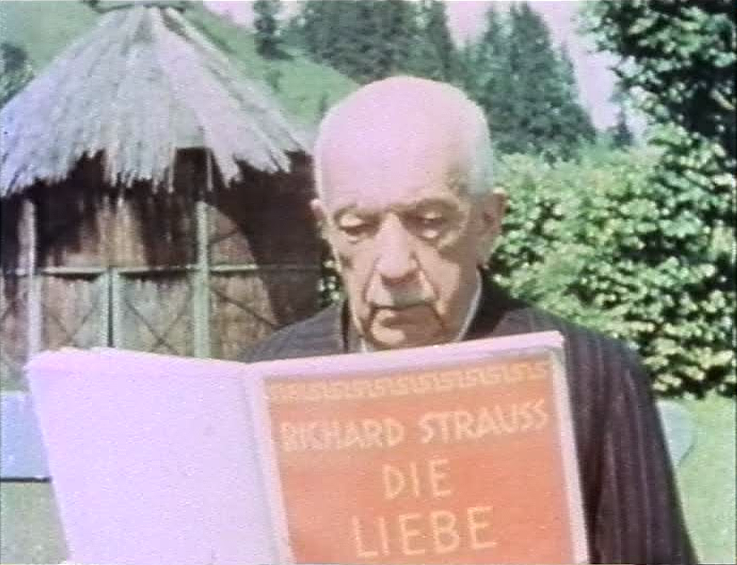
- The composer reading the score, in 1945
- Librettist: Joseph Gregor
- Language: German
- Based on: Hugo von Hofmannsthal sketch "Danae, or The Marriage of Convenience" (1920)
- Premiere: 14 August 1952; Kleines Festspielhaus, Salzburg Festival

Die Liebe der Danae (The Love of Danaë) is an opera in three acts by Richard Strauss to a German libretto by Joseph Gregor, loosely based on a sketch written in 1920 in the style of Jacques Offenbach's satirical works, "Danae, or The Marriage of Convenience", by Hugo von Hofmannsthal.

Strauss worked on the score in 1937, 1938 and into 1939, although he was pre-occupied with completing Daphne, developing ideas with Gregor and finally replacing him as librettist for Capriccio, and then succumbed to illness, which caused postponement for several months into 1940. The opera was finally finished on 28 June 1940.

The work is an ingenious mixture of comedy and Greek mythology, and the final act "contains the opera's finest music, a fact recognized by Strauss."

== Performance history ==
For a variety of reasons, including Strauss' perception that the initial failure of Die Frau ohne Schatten was caused by having been "put on in German theatres too soon after the last war", the composer initially refused to allow Clemens Krauss, to whom he had guaranteed the right to conduct the first performances, to stage it until after the end of World War II. Contradicting his original thoughts, it appears that, as early as November 1942, Strauss had granted Krauss permission to perform the opera as part of the Salzburg Festival. In a letter to the composer, Krauss states that "I shall then bring the work to its first performance in celebration of your 80th birthday" which would take place on 11 June 1944.

Arrangements were made for mid-August performances in 1944, but, following the 20 July plot to assassinate Hitler, Joseph Goebbels declared "total war" and closed all theatres within the Third Reich, resulting in the work not being allowed a public staging. The Nazis did, however, permit a single dress rehearsal in Salzburg, conducted by Clemens Krauss on 16 August, in order that Strauss and an invited audience could hear the work performed. During an orchestral rehearsal before the private presentation, Strauss walked down to the orchestral rail in order to listen closely to the beautiful final interlude in the last act. Rudolf Otto Hartmann, the opera's original producer, wrote of the incident:

Towards the end of the second scene (act 3) Strauss stood up and went down to the front row of stalls. His unmistakeable head stood out in lonely silhouette against the light rising from the pit. The Viennese were playing the wonderful interlude before the last scene ('Jupiter's renunciation', Strauss once called it) with an unsurpassably beautiful sound. Quite immobile, totally oblivious to all else, he stood listening.

Hartmann went on to describe how, as the performance continued, those who witnessed the scene, (were)

profoundly moved and stirred to our depths, sensed the almost physical presence of our divinity, art... Several moments of profound silence followed after the last notes died away... Krauss spoke a few sentences outlining the significance of these last days in Salzburg. Strauss looked over the rail of the pit, raised his hands in a gesture of gratitude and spoke to the orchestra in a voice choked with tears: 'Perhaps we shall meet again in a better world'. He was unable to say any more... Silent and deeply moved, everyone present remained still as he left the auditorium.

The first public performance, also under Krauss, was at the Kleines Festspielhaus during the Salzburg Festival on 14 August 1952, after Strauss' death in 1949. The opera was then given at the Royal Opera House in London on 16 September 1953, under Rudolf Kempe. The first American performance was at the University of Southern California in Los Angeles on 10 April 1964. A new production was presented as part of the 1982 and 1985 summer festival seasons by The Santa Fe Opera, conducted by company founder and lifelong Strauss enthusiast John Crosby. The Semperoper in Dresden gave three performances of the opera in March 2009. In 2006 Renée Fleming recorded the final interlude and Danae's aria from act 3 with the Orchestra of the Mariinsky Theatre conducted by Valery Gergiev for a Decca CD entitled Homage: The Age of the Diva. The Bard SummerScape Festival mounted a new production of the full opera in 2011 with Meagan Miller in the title role, with the American Symphony Orchestra under the baton of Leon Botstein and directed by Kevin Newbury; it was also recorded and released commercially in digital format.

Over the decades, the opera has received relatively few performances in comparison to Strauss's more popular works, mainly on account of its considerable vocal demands and the complexity of its stage directions. Nevertheless, Strauss connoisseurs tend to have a special regard for the work. The eminent critic and Strauss biographer, Michael Kennedy, has written:

The treatment of the many themes and motifs is amazingly inventive, the orchestral colours glow and shine – with Greek gold and mediterranean sunlight... Die Liebe der Danae does not deserve its neglect. Its third act alone lifts it into the category of first-rank Strauss.

== Roles ==
Roles, voice types, premiere casts
| Role | Voice type | Premiere cast 16 August 1944 (dress rehearsal) Conductor: Clemens Krauss | Public premiere cast 14 August 1952 Conductor: Clemens Krauss |
|---|---|---|---|
| Jupiter | baritone | Hans Hotter | Paul Schöffler |
| Merkur (Mercury) | tenor | Franz Klarwein | Josef Traxel |
| Pollux, King of Eos | tenor | Karl Ostertag | László Szemere |
| Danae, his daughter | soprano | Viorica Ursuleac | Annelies Kupper |
| Xanthe, her servant | soprano | Irmgard Handler | Anny Felbermayer |
| Midas, King of Lydia | tenor | Horst Taubmann | Josef Gostic |
| Four Queens: Semele; Europa; Alkmene; Leda | soprano soprano mezzo-soprano contralto | Maud Cunitz; Stefania Fratnik; Maria Cornelius; Anka Jelacic | Dorothea Siebert; Esther Réthy; Georgine von Milinkovič; Sieglinde Wagner |
| Four Kings, nephews to Pollux | 2 tenors, 2 basses | Josef Trojan-Regar; Walter Carnuth; Georg Wieter; Franz Theo Reuter | August Jaresch; Erich Majkut; Harald Pröglhöf; Franz Bierbach |
| Four guards | basses | | |
Creditors, servants and followers of Pollux and Danae, people

== Synopsis ==
Danae, whose father King Pollux is bankrupt and beset by creditors, dreams of a wealthy husband in terms of a shower of golden rain. Royal envoys return with news that Midas, who can turn all to gold, has agreed to woo Danae, and his arrival at the harbour is announced. Danae receives a stranger who is Midas in disguise as his own servant. Strangely drawn to each other, they proceed to the harbour where the supposed King Midas (actually Jupiter in pursuit of another female conquest) greets Danae. Jupiter prepares for his marriage to Danae but, fearing discovery by his wife Juno, forces Midas to deputise for him at the ceremony. When Danae and Midas embrace, she is turned into a golden statue and Jupiter claims her as his divine bride. However, her voice calls for the mortal Midas, she is returned to life, and the lovers disappear into the darkness. Jupiter announces that she will be cursed with poverty. Midas, returned to his former existence as a donkey-driver, reveals to Danae his broken pact with Jupiter, but Danae admits that it was love rather than his golden cloak that won her heart. Jupiter pays off Pollux's creditors with a shower of gold and, realising that Danae is far more than a passing amorous fancy, makes one desperate last attempt to win her back. However, she gives him a hair-clasp, her last golden possession, and the god accepts his loss with a moving farewell.

== Recordings ==
| Year | Cast: Jupiter, Midas, Pollux, Danae | Conductor, Opera house and orchestra | Label |
|---|---|---|---|
| 1952 | Paul Schöffler, Josef Gostic, László Szemere, Annelies Kupper | Clemens Krauss, Vienna Philharmonic and the Vienna State Opera Chorus (Recording of a performance from the Salzburg Festival, 14 August) | CD: Melodram; Cat: 37061; Orfeo; Cat: C 292 923 |
| 2000 | Peter Coleman-Wright, Hugh Smith, William Lewis, Lauren Flanigan | Leon Botstein, American Symphony Orchestra and the Concert Chorale of New York (Recording of a concert performance in Avery Fisher Hall, New York, 16 January) | CD: Telarc; Cat: CD 80570 |
| 2003 | Franz Grundheber, Robert Chafin, Paul McNamara, Manuela Uhl | Ulrich Windfuhr, Kiel Philharmonic Orchestra and the Kiel Opera Chorus (Recording of two concert performances in Kieler Schloss, Kiel, 2 and 11 April) | CD: cpo Cat: 999967-2 |
| 2006 | Norman Bailey, Kenneth Woollam, John Dobson, Arlene Saunders | Charles Mackerras, BBC Symphony Orchestra and BBC Opera Chorus (Live radio broadcast, 2 April 1980 - NB. source was an unofficial off-air recording, and contains instances of interference) | CD: Gala; Cat: GL 100.794 |
| 2011 | Mark Delavan, Matthias Klink, Burkhard Ulrich, Manuela Uhl | Andrew Litton, Orchestra and Chorus of Deutsche Oper Berlin, (Recorded at a performance in Berlin. Stage director Kirsten Harms) | DVD: Arthaus Musik, Cat: 101 580; Blu-ray: Arthaus Musik, Cat: 108 032 |
