= Mikhail Petrenko =

Russian opera singer (born 1976)

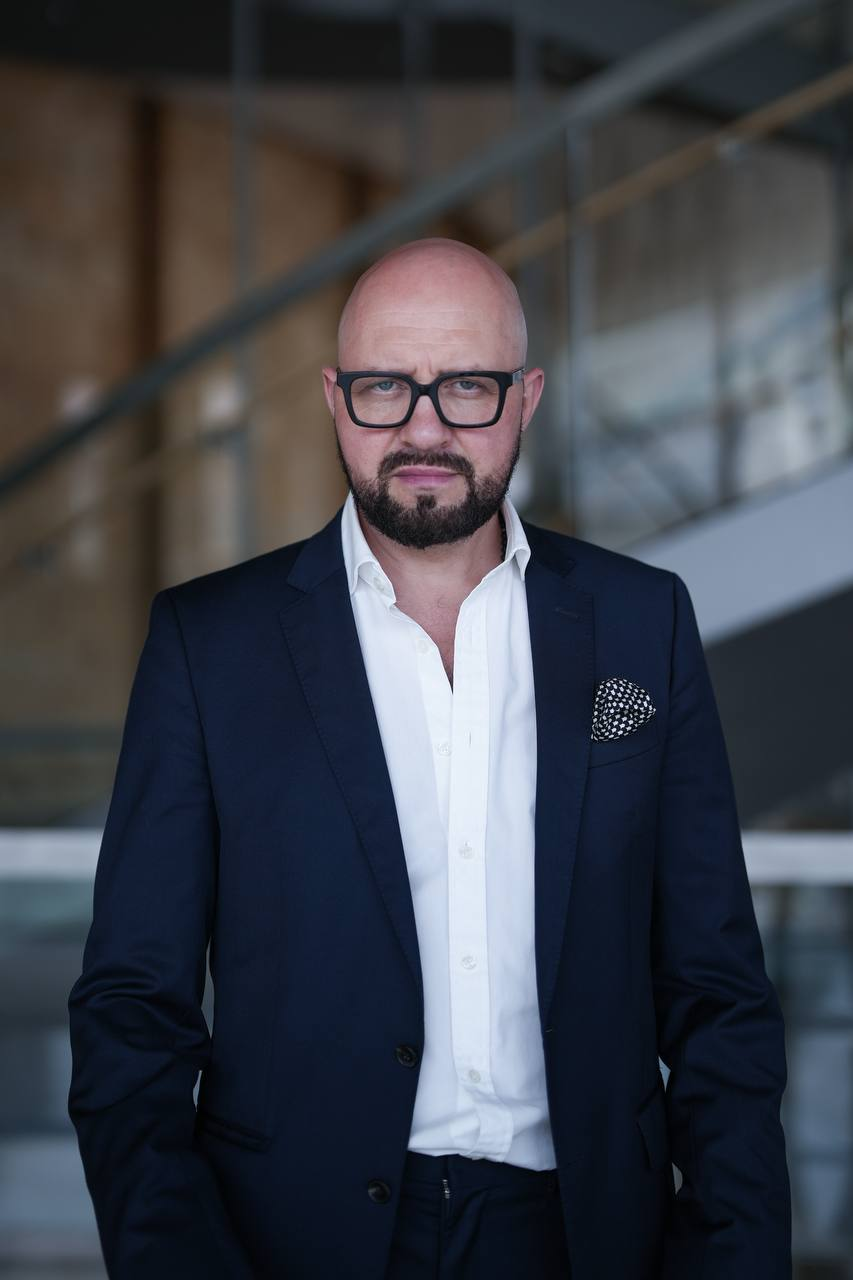

Background information
- Born: 1976 (age 49–50); Leningrad, Soviet Union
- Genre: Opera
- Occupation: Singer
- Instrument: Vocals
- Years active: 1998–present
- Labels: Naxos; Opus Arte; Mariinsky; Bel Air Classiques; Mezzo; Medici

Mikhail Petrenko (born 1976 in Leningrad, Soviet Union) is an opera singer who sings bass. His extensive opera and concert repertoire includes bass parts by both Russian and foreign composers: Glinka, Tchaikovsky, Borodin, Mussorgsky, Rimsky-Korsakov, Prokofiev, Rachmaninov, Shostakovich, Mozart, Beethoven, Verdi, Gounod, Berlioz, Wagner, Richard Strauss and Bartok.

== Biography ==
Petrenko was born in Leningrad. In 1998, as a student at the Saint Petersburg Conservatory at the vocal faculty, he was invited to the Academy of Young Singers of the Mariinsky Theater. In the same year, he made his debut on the stage of the Mariinsky Theater in Sergei Prokofiev's opera Semyon Kotko, where he performed the main role under the direction of Valery Gergiev. Already at the beginning of his solo career, Petrenko was able to win awards at international vocal competitions, including Operalia in Los Angeles, where he won the Grand Prix, as well as at the Maria Callas competitions in Athens, Elena Obraztsova in Moscow and N. A. Rimsky-Korsakov in Saint Petersburg.

Petrenko's international debut took place in 2002 in New York, at the Metropolitan Opera House. Valery Gergiev and Andrei Konchalovsky presented Sergei Prokofiev's opera War and Peace. He played the role of Marshal Davout, and his performance was met with great delight. The next significant stage in Petrenko's career was his debut on the stage of the Berlin State Opera in 2004. With Daniel Barenboim conducting, he performed the role of Hunding in Richard Wagner's opera Die Walküre.

Highlights in the 2013/14 season included: a return to the Metropolitan Opera for Prince Galitsky (Prince Igor) and Netherlands Opera for Gounod's Faust. He also sang the role of Grand Inquisitor (Don Carlo) for the Verbier Festival. In January 2015, Petrenko returned to the Metropolitan Opera in the title role of a new production of Bluebeard's Castle. He has also performed in concerts with the Bamberg Symphony, Finnish Radio Symphony Orchestra, and Swedish Radio Symphony Orchestra.

Today, his professional career spans the leading opera stages of Europe and America. He performs at the Paris Opera, the Metropolitan Opera in New York, at La Scala in Milan, the Bavarian State Opera in Munich, the Royal Opera House in London, the Grand Theater of Geneva, the Vienna State Opera and the Theater an der Wien in Vienna, the Dutch National Opera in Amsterdam, the Berlin State Opera, the Hamburg State Opera, the Bilbao Opera, the Teatro Carlo Felice in Genoa, the Cologne Opera, as well as at the opera festivals in Salzburg, Aix-en-Provence and at the BBC Proms music festivals in London and Verbier.

Over the years, Petrenko has collaborated with such outstanding conductors as Valery Gergiev, Daniel Barenboim, Pierre Boulez, Lorin Maazel, Zubin Mehta, Riccardo Muti, Yannick Nézet-Séguin, Simon Rattle, Esa-Pekka Salonen, Daniel Harding, Christoph Eschenbach, Vladimir Yurovsky, Marc Minkowski, Jonathan Nott, Charles Dutoit and Jeong Myung-hoon.

Recordings featuring Petrenko have been released on classical labels such as Naxos, Opus Arte, Mariinsky, Bel Air Classiques, Mezzo and Medicci. In 2024, Petrenko was awarded the Russian Opera Award Casta Diva in the nomination Singer of the Year.

== Theatrical roles ==
- Ruslan (Ruslan and Lyudmila)
- Konchak, Prince Galitzky (Prince Igor)
- Prince Gremin (Eugene Onegin)
- King René (Iolanta)
- Pimen, Boris Godunov (Boris Godunov)
- Prince Ivan Khovansky (Khovanshchina)
- Prince Nikolai Bolkonsky, Marshal Davout (War and Peace)
- Malyuta Skuratov (The Tsar's Bride)
- Leporello (Don Giovanni)
- Bass (stage version of Verdi's Requiem)
- King Marke (Tristan und Isolde)
- Daland (Der fliegende Holländer)
- King Heinrich (Lohengrin)
- Fafner (Das Rheingold, Siegfried)
- Hunding (Die Walküre)
- Hagen (Götterdämmerung)
- Klingsor, Titurel (Parsifal)
- Hans Sachs (Die Meistersinger von Nürnberg)

In November 2011, he performed the role of Ruslan (Ruslan and Lyudmila) at the reopening of Moscow's historic Bolshoi Theatre.

== Filmography ==
- Metropolitan Opera Live in HD
  - Bluebeard's Castle (2015) ... Bluebeard
  - Prince Igor (2014) ... Prince Galitsky
  - Boris Godunov (2010) ... Pimen
- Götterdämmerung (2013 TV movie) ... Hagen
- Don Giovanni Juan (2010) ... Leporello
- Otello (2008 TV movie) ... Lodovico
- Benvenuto Cellini (2007 TV movie) ... Pope Clemens VII
