= Emanuel List =

Austrian opera singer (1888–1967)

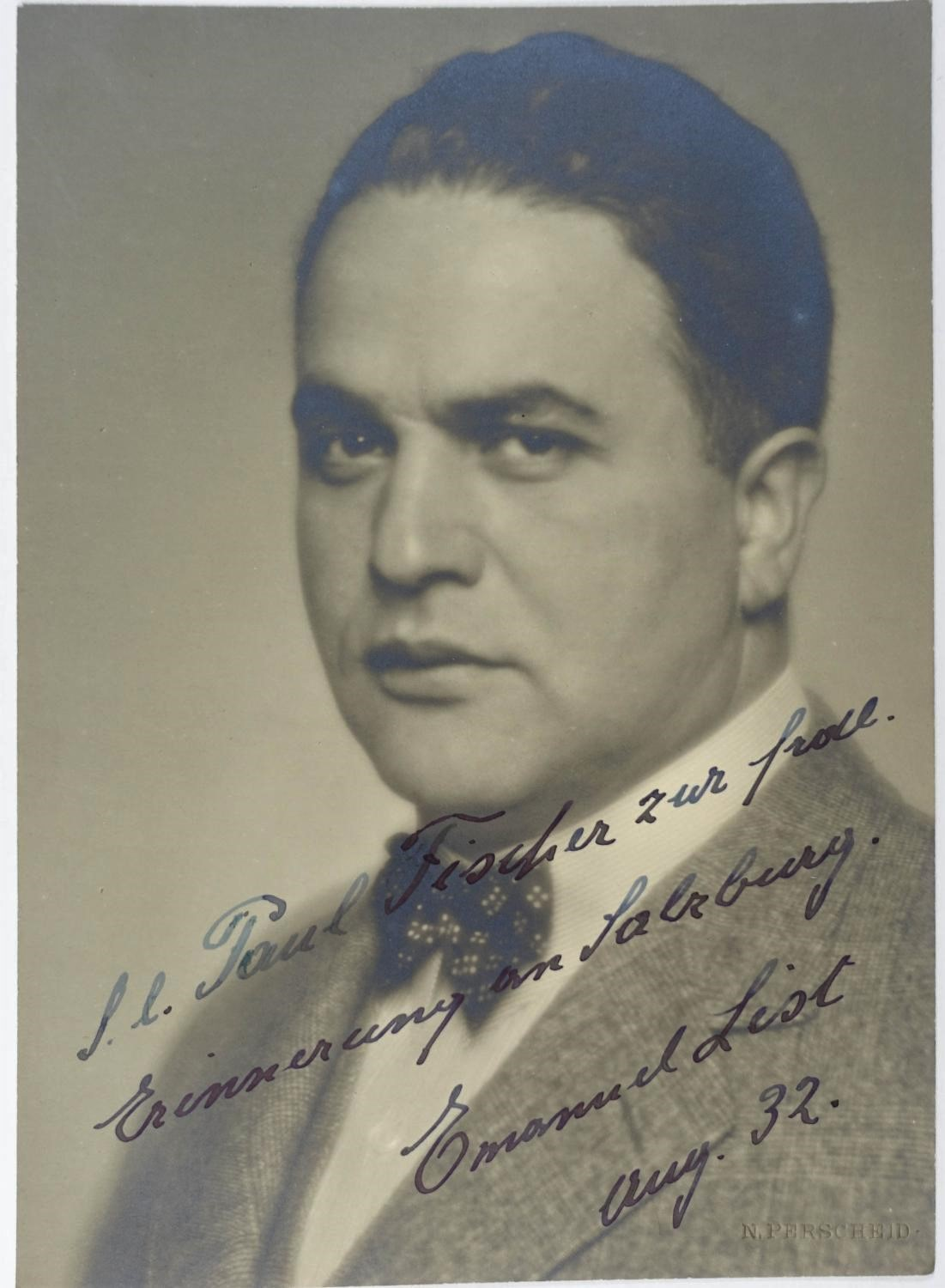
Emanuel List by Nicola Perscheid

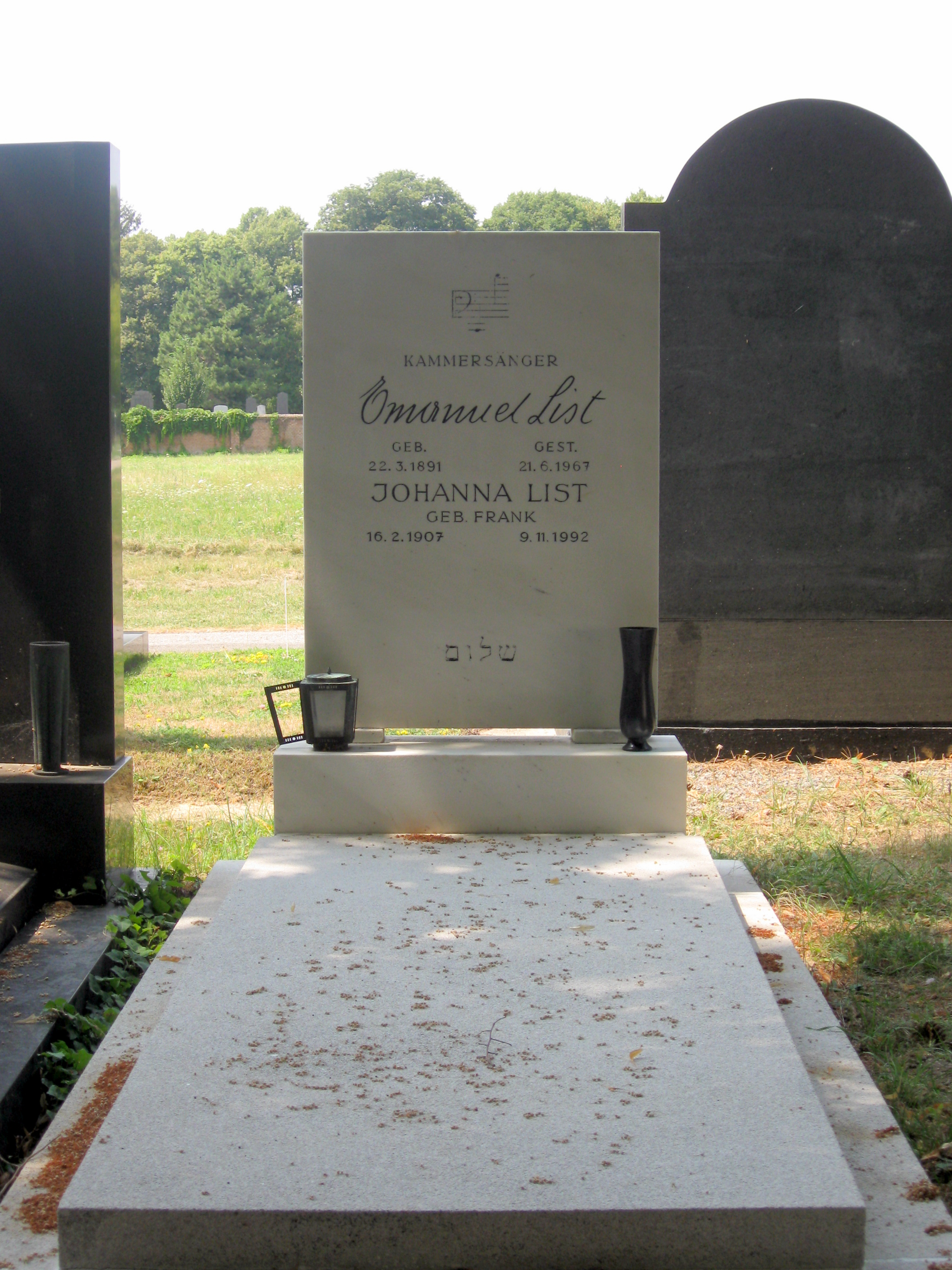
Grave of Emanuel List and his wife Johanna in the Jewish section of the Zentralfriedhof in Vienna

Emanuel List (March 22, 1888, in Vienna – June 21, 1967, in Vienna) was an Austrian-American opera bass. He is best remembered for his performances in Wagnerian operas.

== Career ==
List first began singing as a boy soprano in a Vienna choir, and also sang in the musical theater there. When his family moved to America, he sang in vaudeville. In 1920, he returned to Vienna for additional training; his first opera role was at the Volksoper in 1922, as Mephistopheles in Charles Gounod's Faust. In 1923 he was offered a role in a production at the Charlottenburg opera company in Berlin, and two years later he joined the Berlin State Opera. That year he debuted in the role of Pogner in Wagner's Die Meistersinger, and went on to portray King Mark in Tristan und Isolde, Hunding in Die Walküre and Hagen in Götterdammerung, as well as Ramfis in Giuseppe Verdi's Aida and Baron Ochs in Richard Strauss's Der Rosenkavalier.

At the Salzburg Festival in Austria, List reprised his performance as King Mark and also played the roles of Osmin in Mozart's Die Entführung aus dem Serail and Commendatore in Don Giovanni, as well as Rocco in Beethoven's Fidelio. He did the entire Ring Cycle at the 1933 Bayreuth Festival, singing Hunding, Hagen, and Fafner.

List's Jewish heritage led him to leave Germany in 1933 for America; later that year he played the Landgrave in Wagner's Tannhäuser at the Metropolitan Opera, and remained in the company until 1950. He became an American citizen, and sang in San Francisco, Chicago, and Buenos Aires in addition to New York. In 1950, he made his first appearance in Berlin since he had left the country, and retired in 1952. He died in 1967.

List Hall at the Metropolitan Opera House is named in his honor.
