= Stuart Skelton =

Australian operatic heldentenor (born 1968)

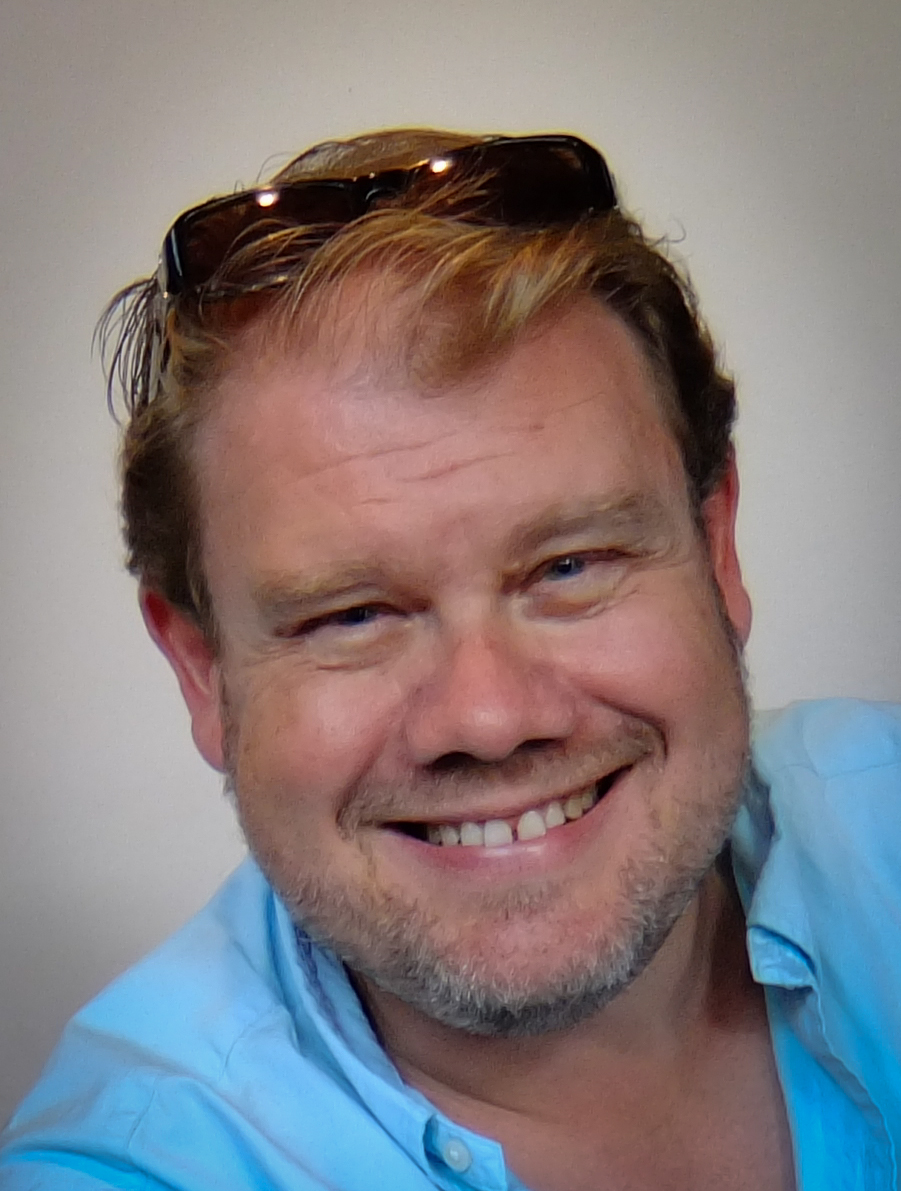
- Stuart Skelton in August 2013
- Born: 1968 (age 57–58); Sydney, Australia
- Occupation: Opera singer (tenor)
- Website: stuartskelton.com

Stuart Skelton (born 1968 in Sydney) is an Australian operatic heldentenor. In 2016 he opened the Metropolitan Opera season with Nina Stemme in Wagner's Tristan und Isolde.

== Discography ==
Studio concert recordings

- 2008: Mahler – Das Lied von der Erde, with conductor Michael Tilson Thomas and the San Francisco Symphony
- 2010: Mahler – Das Lied von der Erde, with conductor Vladimir Ashkenazy and the Sydney Symphony Orchestra
- 2011: Lancino – Requiem, with conductor Eliahu Inbal and the Orchestre philharmonique de Radio France, Naxos
- 2020: Peter Grimes, with conductor Edward Gardner and the Bergen Philharmonic Orchestra, Chandos

Live opera recordings

- 2009: Siegmund in Wagner's Die Walküre, with conductor Simone Young in Hamburg, Oehms Classics

== Awards ==
Skelton won the Best Male Performer in a Supporting Role in an Opera at the 5th Helpmann Awards in 2005 for his Siegmund in Wagner's Ring Cycle at the State Opera of South Australia, and the Helpmann Award for Best Male Performer in an Opera in 2010 for his title role in Peter Grimes for Opera Australia.

=== International Opera Awards ===
The International Opera Awards is an annual awards ceremony honouring excellence in opera around the world.

Year	Nominee / work	Award	Result
2014	himself	Male Singer of the Year	Won

=== AIR Awards ===
The Australian Independent Record Awards (commonly known informally as AIR Awards) is an annual awards night to recognise, promote and celebrate the success of Australia's Independent Music sector.

Year	Nominee / work	Award	Result
2020	Asher Fisch – Tristan und Isolde	Best Independent Classical Album	Nominated
