= Poul Elming =

Danish opera singer (born 1949)

Poul Elming (born 21 July 1949, Ålborg) is a Danish opera singer. He began his career as a baritone; making his professional debut in 1979 as a member of the Jutland Opera in Århus. He then pursued studies at the Juilliard School in New York City where his voice was re-trained in the tenor repertoire. In 1989, he made his debut as a tenor at the Royal Danish Theatre as the title hero in Richard Wagner's Parsifal. He has since sung leading roles with major opera companies and festivals throughout the world, including the Bayreuth Festival, the Berlin State Opera, the Liceu, the Lyric Opera of Chicago, the Royal Opera, London, the San Francisco Opera, and the Vienna State Opera among others.

He would appear at the Bayreuth Festival from 1990 to 2001, mainly singing the title role of Parsifal plus Siegmund (Die Walküre), plus Melot and the Young Seaman in Tristan und Isolde.
