= Josef Gostic =

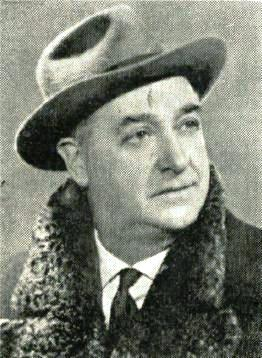
Jože Gostič

Josef Gostic (March 5, 1900 – December 25, 1963) was a Slovene operatic tenor.

Born Josip Gostič in Stara Loka, Slovenia, he studied at the Ljubljana Conservatory, making his debut there in 1929. He became first tenor at the Zagreb Opera in 1937, and began making guest appearances at the opera houses of Vienna, Prague, Berlin, and Dresden.

He created the role of Midas in Richard Strauss's Die Liebe der Danae at the Salzburg Festival in 1952, then sang the role at La Scala in Milan and the Paris Opéra in 1953. That same year he made his London debut at the Stoll Theatre, as Ero in Jakov Gotovac's Ero s onoga svijeta (Ero the Joker), his greatest role, and in 1958, appeared at the Royal Opera House, as Grigori in Boris Godunov.

His strong, bright-toned voice was also heard to good advantage in Verdi roles including Manrico, Radames, Otello.

== Sources ==
- Grove Music Online, Elizabeth Forbes, May 2008.
