= Der Rosenkavalier discography =

This is a discography of Der Rosenkavalier, an opera in three acts with music by Richard Strauss to a German-language libretto by Hugo von Hofmannsthal. Der Rosenkavalier was first performed at the Königliches Opernhaus in Dresden on 26 January 1911 under the direction of Max Reinhardt.

== Audio recordings ==
Year	Cast (Marschallin, Octavian, Sophie, Ochs, Faninal, Italian singer)	Conductor Orchestra, chorus	Label
1933	Lotte Lehmann, Maria Olszewska, Elisabeth Schumann, Richard Mayr; Viktor Madin	Robert Heger; Vienna Philharmonic, Vienna State Opera Chorus	Naxos "Historical"; Cat: 8.110191-92 (abridged version; no selections with Faninal or the Italian Singer)
1942	Viorica Ursuleac, Georgine von Milinkovič, Adele Kern, Ludwig Weber, Georg Hann, Franz Klarwein	Clemens Krauss; Munich State Opera (Broadcast performance of June 1942)	Vox Records; Cat: PL 7774 (Concert Version)
1949	Eleanor Steber, Rise Stevens, Erna Berger, Emanuel List, Hugh Thompson, Giuseppe di Stefano	Fritz Reiner; Metropolitan Opera Orchestra and Chorus (Recording of a live performance, 21 November 1949)	Naxos; Cat: 8.110277-79
1949	Maria Reining, Jarmila Novotná, Hilde Güden, Jaro Prohaska, Georg Hann, Helge Rosvaenge	George Szell; Vienna Philharmonic; Chorus of the Vienna State Opera (live recording, 12 August 1949, Salzburg Festival)	Andante; Cat: AND 3985
1954	Maria Reining, Sena Jurinac, Hilde Gueden, Ludwig Weber, Alfred Poell, Anton Dermota	Erich Kleiber; Vienna Philharmonic Orchestra; Vienna State Opera Chorus	Decca Legends; Cat: 289 467-111-2 (CD reissue)
1955	Maria Reining, Sena Jurinac, Hilde Gueden, Kurt Böhme, Alfred Poell, Karl Terkal	Hans Knappertsbusch; Orchestra of the Vienna State Opera; Vienna State Opera Chorus (Recorded live, 16 November 1955, Vienna State Opera)	RCA; Cat: 69431
1956	Elisabeth Schwarzkopf, Christa Ludwig, Teresa Stich-Randall, Otto Edelmann, Eberhard Waechter, Nicolai Gedda	Herbert von Karajan; Philharmonia Orchestra; Philharmonia Chorus	EMI; Cat: 77357
1958	Marianne Schech, Irmgard Seefried, Rita Streich, Kurt Böhme, Dietrich Fischer-Dieskau, Rudolf Francl	Karl Böhm; Sächsische Staatskapelle Dresden; Chorus of the Staatsoper Dresden	Deutsche Grammophon; Cat: SLPM 138 040/43
1960	Lisa della Casa, Sena Jurinac, Hilde Gueden, Otto Edelmann, Erich Kunz, Giuseppe Zampieri	Herbert von Karajan; Vienna Philharmonic; Chorus of the Vienna State Opera (Recorded live, 26 July 1960, Salzburg Festival, Großes Festspielhaus)	Deutsche Grammophon; Cat: 289 453-200-2
1965	Montserrat Caballé, Teresa Zylis-Gara, Edith Mathis, Otto Edelmann, John Modenos, Jon Andrew	John Pritchard; London Philharmonic Orchestra; Chorus of Glyndebourne Opera (live recording from 30 May 1965)	Glyndebourne; Cat: GFOCD010-65
1968/69	Régine Crespin, Yvonne Minton, Helen Donath, Manfred Jungwirth, Otto Wiener, Luciano Pavarotti	Sir Georg Solti; Vienna Philharmonic Orchestra; Chorus of the Vienna State Opera	Decca; Cat: 475 9988
1969	Christa Ludwig, Tatiana Troyanos, Edith Mathis, Theo Adam, Anton de Ridder	Karl Böhm; Vienna Philharmonic Orchestra (Live recording 27 July, Salzburg Festival)	Deutsche Grammophon; Cat: 445 338-2
1971	Christa Ludwig, Gwyneth Jones, Lucia Popp, Walter Berry, Ernst Gutstein, Plácido Domingo	Leonard Bernstein; Vienna Philharmonic Orchestra; Chorus of the Vienna State Opera	Sony; Cat: M3K 42546
1973	Claire Watson, Brigitte Fassbaender, Lucia Popp, Karl Ridderbusch, Benno Kusche, Gerhard Unger	Carlos Kleiber; Bavarian State Orchestra; Chorus of the Bavarian State Opera (live recording, 13 July 1973)	Orfeo d'Or; Cat: C581083
1976	Evelyn Lear, Frederica von Stade, Ruth Welting, Jules Bastin, Derek Hammond-Stroud, José Carreras	Edo de Waart; Rotterdam Philharmonic; Chorus of Netherlands Opera	Philips; Cat: 289 442 338-2 (CD reissue)
1984	Anna Tomowa-Sintow, Agnes Baltsa, Janet Perry, Kurt Moll, Gottfried Hornik, Vinson Cole	Herbert von Karajan; Vienna Philharmonic; Chorus of the Vienna State Opera	Deutsche Grammophon; Cat: 423850
1985	Anna Pusar-Joric, Ute Walther, Margot Stejskal, Theo Adam, Rolf Haunstein, Klaus König	Hans Vonk; Staatskapelle Dresden; Chorus of the Dresden State Opera (live recording, February 1985, Semperoper, Dresden)	Denon; Cat: C37 7482/4
1990	Kiri Te Kanawa, Anne Sofie von Otter, Barbara Hendricks, Kurt Rydl, Franz Grundheber, Richard Leech	Bernard Haitink; Staatskapelle Dresden, Staatsopernchor Dresden; Knaben des Dresdner Kreuzchores	EMI; Cat: CDCC 7 54259 2
1995	Anna Tomowa-Sintow, Ann Murray, Barbara Bonney, Kurt Moll, Alan Opie, Bonaventura Bottone	Andrew Davis, Chorus and Orchestra of the Royal Opera House, Covent Garden (live performance from 1995)	Opus Arte; Cat: OACD9006D
2009	Renée Fleming, Sophie Koch, Diana Damrau, Franz Hawlata, Franz Grundheber, Jonas Kaufmann	Christian Thielemann; Münchner Philharmoniker; Philharmonia Chor Wien	Decca 289 478-150-7
2017	Camilla Nylund, Paula Murrihy, Hanna-Elisabeth Muller, Peter Rose, Martin Gantner, Yosep Kang	Marc Albrecht; Netherlands Philharmonic Orchestra; Chorus of Dutch National Opera	Challenge Classics; Cat: CC72741

== Video recordings ==
Year	Cast (Marschallin, Octavian, Sophie, Ochs, Faninal, Italian singer)	Conductor, Orchestra, Chorus (Production details)	Label
1960	Elisabeth Schwarzkopf, Sena Jurinac, Anneliese Rothenberger, Otto Edelmann, Erich Kunz, Giuseppe Zampieri	Herbert von Karajan, Vienna Philharmonic, Vienna State Opera Chorus (Film of the 1960 Salzburg Festival production; film director: Paul Czinner; stage director: Rudolf Hartmann)	Blu-ray/DVD: Kultur Video; Cat: D4686 (Blu-ray)
1979	Gwyneth Jones, Brigitte Fassbaender, Lucia Popp, Manfred Jungwirth, Benno Kusche, Francisco Araiza	Carlos Kleiber, Bavarian State Opera Orchestra and Chorus (Staged and directed by Otto Schenk; recorded in May, National Theatre, Munich)	DVD: Deutsche Grammophon; Cat: 073 4072 GH2
1982	Kiri Te Kanawa, Tatiana Troyanos, Judith Blegen, Kurt Moll, Derek Hammond-Stroud, Luciano Pavarotti	James Levine, Metropolitan Opera Orchestra and Chorus (Production: Nathaniel Merrill; designer: Robert O'Hearn; recorded live 7 October)	DVD: The Metropolitan Opera; Streaming video: Met Opera on Demand
1984	Anna Tomowa-Sintow, Agnes Baltsa, Janet Perry, Kurt Moll, Gottfried Hornik, Vinson Cole	Herbert von Karajan, Vienna Philharmonic Orchestra, Vienna State Opera Chorus (Stage director: Herbert von Karajan; recorded live, 1984 Salzburg Festival)	DVD: Sony; Cat: 88697296039
1985	Kiri Te Kanawa, Anne Howells, Barbara Bonney, Aage Haugland, Jonathan Summers, Dennis O'Neill	Georg Solti, Orchestra and Chorus of the Royal Opera House, Covent Garden (Stage director: John Schlesinger; recorded live, 14 February)	DVD: Opus Arte; Warner Vision; Cat: 0630 19391-2
1994	Felicity Lott, Anne Sofie von Otter, Barbara Bonney, Kurt Moll, Gottfried Hornik, Keith Ikaya-Purdy	Carlos Kleiber, Vienna Philharmonic Orchestra, Vienna State Opera Chorus (Stage director: Otto Schenk; recorded live in March, Vienna State Opera)	DVD: Deutsche Grammophon; Cat: 073 008-9
2004	Adrianne Pieczonka, Angelika Kirchschlager, Miah Persson, Franz Hawlata, Franz Grundheber, Piotr Beczała	Semyon Bychkov, Vienna Philharmonic Orchestra, Vienna State Opera Chorus (Stage director: Robert Carsen)	DVD: TDK; Cat: DVWW OPROKA
2004	Nina Stemme, Vesselina Kasarova, Malin Hartelius, Alfred Muff, Adrian Eröd, Boiko Zvetanov	Franz Welser-Möst, Orchestra and Chorus of Zurich Opera (Stage director: Sven-Eric Bechtolf)	DVD: EMI; Cat: 5 44258 9
2009	Renée Fleming, Sophie Koch, Diana Damrau, Franz Hawlata, Franz Grundheber, Jonas Kaufmann	Christian Thielemann, Münchner Philharmoniker, Philharmonia Chorus Vienna (Production: Herbert Wernicke; recorded 31 January, Festspielhaus Baden-Baden)	Blu-ray/DVD/CD: Decca; Cat: 0044007433409
2010	Renée Fleming, Susan Graham, Christine Schäfer, Kristinn Sigmundsson, Thomas Allen, Eric Cutler	Edo de Waart, Metropolitan Opera Orchestra and Chorus (Production: Nathaniel Merrill; designer: Robert O'Hearn; stage director: Robin Guarino; recorded live 1 January)	HD video: Met Opera on Demand
2010	Cheryl Barker, Catherine Carby, Emma Pearson, Manfred Hemm, Warwick Fyfe, Henry Choo	Andrew Litton, Opera Australia (Director: Brian FitzGerald; recorded 13 and 19 October, Sydney Opera House)	Blu-ray/DVD/CD: Opera Australia; OPOZ56027BD; OPOZ56026DVD; OPOZ56028CD
2014	Kate Royal, Tara Erraught, Teodora Gheorghiu, Lars Woldt, Michael Kraus, Andrej Dunaev	Robin Ticciati, London Philharmonic Orchestra, Glyndebourne Festival Chorus (Stage director: Richard Jones; recorded live, 5 and 8 June, Glyndebourne Opera House)	Blu-ray/DVD: Opus Arte; Cat: OA1170D; Streaming: Glyndebourne Encore
2014	Krassimira Stoyanova, Sophie Koch, Mojca Erdmann, Günther Groissböck, Adrian Eröd, Ștefan Pop	Franz Welser-Möst, Vienna Philharmonic, (Stage director: Harry Kupfer; recorded live in August, Salzburg Festival, Großes Festspielhaus)	Blu-ray/DVD: C Major (Naxos); Cat: 719404
2017	Renée Fleming, Elīna Garanča, Erin Morley, Günther Groissböck, Markus Brück, Matthew Polenzani	Sebastian Weigle, Metropolitan Opera Orchestra and Chorus (Production: Robert Carsen; recorded live 13 May)	HD video: Met Opera on Demand; Blu-ray/DVD: Decca; Cat: 004400743945
2020	Camilla Nylund, Michele Losier, Nadine Sierra, Gunther Groissbock, Atalla Ayan, Roman Trekel	Zubin Mehta, Staatskapelle Berlin, Chorus of the Berlin State Opera (Stage director: André Heller; recorded live in February, Staatsoper Unter den Linden, Berlin)	Blu-ray/DVD: Arthaus Musik; Cat: 109446
2023	Lise Davidsen, Samantha Hankey, Erin Morley, Günther Groissböck, Brian Mulligan, René Barbera	Simone Young, Metropolitan Opera Orchestra and Chorus (Production: Robert Carsen; recorded live, 15 April)	HD video: Met Opera on Demand
