= Hildegard Ranczak =

Austrian opera singer

Hildegard Ranczak (Vítkovice, 20 December 1895 - Vienna, February 1987) was a Bohemian operatic soprano, particularly associated with Richard Strauss roles, and largely based in Germany. She married German baritone Fritz Schaetzler.

She studied in Vienna with Irene Schlemmer-Ambros and her debut in Düsseldorf in 1919, as Pamina. After engagements in Cologne (1923–25), Stuttgart (1926–28), she became a member of the Munich State Opera, where under the direction of Clemens Krauss she often appeared in operas by Richard Strauss, creating Clairon in Capriccio, other notable roles included Octavian, Zdenka, Aithra, Die Farberin.

In 1944 she played Tosca recorded with the Berliner Rundfunk-Sinfonie-Orchester under conductor Leopold Ludwig.

She made guest appearances in Vienna, Paris, London, Rome, Dresden. Her last performance was as Carmen in Munich, in 1945.

== Selected recordings ==
- Die Boheme - Trude Eipperle, Alfons Fugel, Hildegard Ranczak, Carl Kronenberg, Georg Hann, Georg Wieter - Munich State Opera Chorus and Orchestra, Clemens Krauss - Cantus Classic (1940)
- Tosca - Hildegard Ranczak, Helge Rosvaenge, Georg Hann - Berlin Radio Chorus and Orchestra, Leopold Hager - Cantus Classic (1944)

== Sources ==
- Grove Music Online, David Cummings, May 2008.
