= Klarwein =

Klarwein is a surname. Notable people with the surname include:

- Franz Klarwein (1914–1991), German tenor
- Jason Klarwein (born c. 1976), Australian actor, director and producer
- Mati Klarwein (1932–2002), French painter
- Michaela Klarwein (born 1943 or 1946), German actress
- Ossip Klarwein (1893–1970), Polish-born German-Israeli architect
