= Allerseelen (band) =

Australian music project

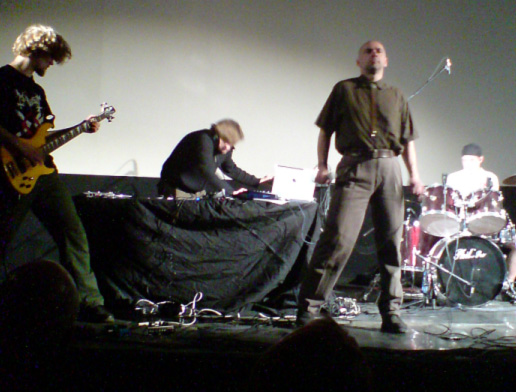
- Allerseelen on stage in Nizhny Novgorod with members of Sal Solaris

Background information
- Origin: Austria
- Genres: Neofolk, Martial industrial, Experimental
- Years active: 1987–today
- Label: Aorta/Ahnstern
- Members: Gerhard "Kadmon" Petak

Allerseelen is an Austrian experimental music project since 1987, named for the Catholic festival of All Souls' Day and also for the song by Richard Strauss and a chapter in Blue of Noon by George Bataille.

It became a solo project in 1989 that is ultimately continued by the Austrian musician Gerhard Petak, also known as Gerhard "Kadmon" or Gerhard "Hallstatt.". Since then he has been responsible for all lyrics while collaborating with different groups for performances. His music is experimental, sometimes post-industrial and military pop and has often fallen into the neo-folk and pagan rock categories. Many recordings explicitly take up themes of Nazi history.

== Band History ==
=== Background ===
Until the experimental music group disbanded after several concerts due to internal differences, Allerseelen originally consisted of four members: Clemens Spanninger, Leopold Graf, Gerd Holoubek and Gerhard Petak, the current music group leader.

In the 1980s Petak played drums for Michael DeWitt's Zero Kama and at one appearance of Hermann Nitsch's Orgien Mysterien Theater. He used the name "Kadmon" from the kabbalistic Adam Kadmon until 2001.

=== 1989 -2000 ===
Petak reactivated the band in 1989 and developed it as his solo project. Numerous demo recordings and cassette albums exist from these two periods.

After a series of cassettes, in 1993 Petak released his first CD, Cruor, a purely instrumental compilation of work since 1989 with a Mithraic and shamanistic focus and cover art of an underground temple. He described his work then as "technosophic music" and its style drew on Tibetan ritual music as well as bands including Throbbing Gristle; instruments used in the album include bone flutes, violin, and metallic percussion. Zillo reviewed the work as "a good mixture of folk-influenced and more experimental songs".

The 1995 album Gotos=Kalanda is a setting of a cycle of twelve love-poems by the Nazi esoteric philosopher and SS officer Karl Maria Wiligut on the subject of the Germanic months, and depicts on its cover the black sun mosaic from the SS fortress Wewelsburg, which Allerseelen have also used as an emblem. The album gave Allerseelen a reputation for glorifying Nazism. Allerseelen have also released records in collaboration with Storm, the right-wing musician Michael Moynihan's label. Petak has said that he was undermining the lyrics on Gotos=Kalanda with dissonant settings, and in the 2005 reissue on LP, added a setting of Ernst Busch's "Lied der Gefangenen" (Prisoners' Song), which was supposedly circulated among the concentration camp prisoners who worked under Himmler renovating the Wewelsburg.

Sturmlieder, Allerseelen's next album, appeared in 1997 and in addition to "In Stahlgewittern", inspired by Ernst Jünger's memoir of the First World War, includes "Leichenfarbne Dämmerung", which quotes from Nietzsche's Thus Spake Zarathustra, "Heiliges Blut", inspired by Alejandro Jodorowsky's film Santa Sangre, and "Sturmlied", sung by Ostara, which quotes the poem of the same name by Ricarda Huch and was a hit. The cover picture is of a sculpture of Odin by Bernhard Hoetger, an Expressionist whose work was suppressed by the Nazis.

In the following album, Stirb und Werde, issued in 1999, the guest singer was Sabine, who became a long-term collaborator with Allerseelen. Some of the tracks were reissues, including "Alle Lust will Ewigkeit", from a 7" record published in homage to Leni Riefenstahl's film The Blue Light, and "Feuertaufe", from a French Mithraic compilation. Others were inspired by or pay homage to Jünger, Nietzsche, Julius Evola, and Igor Stravinsky; the printed material quotes the French philosopher Jean Baudrillard and includes images from the occult film Lucifer Rising.

=== Since 2000 ===
With Neuschwabenland (2000, named for an expedition to the Antarctic carried out by the Nazi regime in 1938–39) Petak announced a shift from dissonance to "fin de siècle military pop", which has been credited as the first use of the term. Tracks are based on or refer to among others Jünger (who is quoted on the cover), Hermann Hesse and his wife Ninon Hesse, the Icelandic heathen poet Sveinbjörn Beinteinsson, the tango composer Astor Piazzolla, and in titles, a book on esoteric Hitlerism by Miguel Serrano and Where the Wild Things Are by Maurice Sendak.

Venezia, Allerseelen's 2001 album, includes lyrics by Nietzsche (his poem "Venedig") as well as Rainer Maria Rilke, Ezra Pound, and Jean Cocteau.

In 2002 Allerseelen issued Abenteuerliches Herz, again drawing on Jünger, including for its title, but described by Petak as harking back to the French poètes maudits he enjoyed in his youth. The album includes a new version of "Santa Sangre" and a neo-folk adaptation of Iggy Pop's "Shoeshine Girl", to new lyrics by Petak. It has Spanish colour in the musical treatments and was the result of collaboration with Spanish groups: Circe and the Catalan musician Demian's project Ô Paradis. There is also percussion by the Moroccan group Rubbayat. The cover photo of a Megalithic monument in Spain is by the Vienna erotic photographer Helmut Wolech. At this time Petak backed up Demian on the album Serpiente de Luna, Serpiente de Sol, which appeared on Aorta, and adopted the professional name Gerhard.

Flamme, released in 2003, incorporates classical strings and includes lyrics by Friedrich Hölderlin, Novalis, and Juan Ramón Jiménez as well as the rune-mystic Friedrich Bernhard Marby, and another song was inspired by an alchemical work by Serrano. The album's cover quote is again from Nietzsche.

Also in 2003 Petak released Wir rufen deine Wölfe, a collaboration with Moynihan's band Blood Axis, Ô Paradis, and Waldteufel based on work by the German mystic and anti-Nazi Friedrich Hielscher.

Heimliche Welt and Gefiederte Träume were 2004 reissues on LP of Allerseelen music first issued as far back as 1989.

Edelweiss, issued in December 2005, is a compilation of tracks, many reworked in less harsh style, with Rosa, Gaya, Josef, and M. Precht as guest vocalists. A reviewer noted that Petak's newer compositions were often inspired by Megalithic monuments.

In 2007 Allerseelen released Hallstatt, Petak's first album of substantially new music since Abenteuerliches Herz. Using only male voices, and except for one song in English, only German, with lyrics by Goethe, Hermann von Gilm, Christian Friedrich Hebbel, Hermann Hesse, Friedrich Hölderlin, Alfred Kubin, and Nietzsche, it has an Austrian focus; the cover photo is of skulls in the chapel at Hallstatt. A reviewer noted that Petak was now calling his music krautpop or "industrial Folklore", and criticised his over-repetition of samples from "obscure recordings" to build atmosphere and for rhythmic purposes. With this album, Petak began using the name Gerhard Hallstatt.

The 2010 album Rauhe Seelen struck a reviewer as more romantic than previous Allerseelen releases, with a less jagged use of electronic sampling. The reviewer also noted that frequent collaborators with Allerseelen such as Dimo Dimov of the Bulgarian group Svarrogh and Marcel P. of the German group Miel Noir were in effect coalescing into a band.

Allerseelen's following album, Terra Incognita, so named according to Petak because he did not know at the outset how it would turn out, was released in 2015 and includes reworkings of old tracks as well as new material, with lyrics by Nietzsche, Goethe, and Richard Wagner and several guest artists: John Haughm of Agalloch, Jörg B. of Der Blutharsch, Daniel P. of Arnica, Alexander Wieser of Hrefnesholt, and Robert N. Taylor of Changes. The album is illustrated with mountain photographs by Petak; the cover image is of a memorial chapel to Empress Elisabeth of Austria.

Dunkelgraue Lieder, released in 2017, consists of digitally remastered, shortened versions of the tracks from Sturmlieder with the addition of the original and new versions of two songs that Allerseelen recorded for Agalloch's 2011 album Whitedivisiongrey, and three other new songs. The album is illustrated with photographs that Petak took in Oregon in 2010.

The album Chairete Daimones (Ancient Greek for "Welcome, daemons") was released in 2019 and titled for a libation invocation revived by Nietzsche in 1871. In addition to Nietzsche, Wiligut, and Ninon Hesse, it includes lyrics by Elisabeth of Austria, Aleister Crowley, Walter Flex, Yrjö von Grönhagen, Yves Kéler, Gotthold Ephraim Lessing, Anaïs Nin, Ferdinand Raimund, Knud Rasmussen, Isabelle Sandy, and Petak's girlfriend, Aida de Acosta. A reviewer noted that the coalescence of Allerseelen into a group continued, with Marcel P. and Estella Plunket of Miel Noir appearing once more, together with other guest artists including Thomas Bøjden of Die Weisse Rose, Aki Cederberg of Halo Manash, and the Algerian singer Faye R.

== Other media ==
Petak has also published writings in periodical form as Ahnstern, previously Aorta. Issues have included studies of cultural figures of the Nazi era including Wiligut, Riefenstahl, Otto Rahn, and Evola, and in one Petak praised the Romanian Iron Guard as a "spiritual movement with the objective of combating mechanistic materialism (Panzermaterialismus) and all world views that elevate the material over the spiritual". A 1993 issue covers the supposed magical defence of England from the Luftwaffe by English witches, which is also the unifying theme of Sturmlieder. Ahnstern suspended publication after 29 issues; a compilation of material was published in English as Blutleuchte in 2010, and in French in 2011.

He also contributed to right-wing publications such as the German newspaper Staatsbriefe, and along with other European neo-pagan musicians including Moynihan, to a 2001 issue of Philippe Randa's right-wing French journal Dualpha dedicated to Evola. He has praised musicians who pursue a "Nordic Nietzscheanism", thus making Black Metal music into a "pagan avant-garde, a Nordic 'occulture'".

== Controversy ==
Early in the 21st century, the Bremen anti-right-wing project Grufties gegen Rechts Bremen evaluated Petak's writings, use of symbolism and sources in his music, and collaborations and judged him to be "an innovative right-wing culture warrior who should be taken seriously", but with a "self-contained" and "ethnically pluralistic" view of the world, neither a "fascist bully-boy" nor a "nostalgic fan of Hitler".

In a statement, Petak distanced himself from far-right ideology:

“We believe in the consciousness-expanding power of art. Our influences are Surrealism, Symbolism, and the art of the Pre-Raphaelites. The focus is on the artwork itself, its form and power, and the personality. We have set poems by Rainer Maria Rilke, Ninon, and Hermann Hesse to music. Ricarda Huch, whose beautiful poem “Sturmlied” we have set to music several times, most recently in a flamenco version, was a vehement critic of the Third Reich. For All Souls' Day, we have another flamenco piece, “Sonne golthi-ade,” which is based on a rune poem by Friedrich Bernhard Marby—this poet was imprisoned for several years in various concentration camps during the Nazi era. It is precisely our love for small countries and regions like the Basque Country, Catalonia, Corsica, Austria, South Tyrol, and Slovenia that prevents us from glorifying totalitarian or authoritarian structures and systems.

== Discography ==
Allerseelen's recordings have been issued on the private label "Aorta", with various distributors, and since 2004 on "Ahnstern", a collaboration with "Steinklang" - a Salzburg imprint. Album design is by Stefan Alt, known as Salt; several have cover art by the Bulgarian artists HaateKaate.

=== Albums and EPs ===
Year	Title	Format, Special Notes
1989	Autdaruta	Cassette
1989	Requiem	Cassette
1990	Autdaruta	Cassette
1990	Requiem	Cassette
1992	Auslese	Cassette
1994	Cruor	CD
1995	Gotos=Kalanda	CD
1995	Walked In Line/Ernting	7"
1996	Sturmlieder	CD
1998	Käferlied/Brian Boru	7", split with Blood Axis
1999	Alle Lust Will Ewigkeit/Traumlied	7"
1999	Stirb Und Werde	CD
2000	Neuschwabenland	CD
2000	Nornar Nagli/Panzergarten	7"
2001	Canco De Somni/Marques De Pubol	7"
2001	Venezia	CD
2002	Abenteuerliches Herz	CD
2002	Knistern/Löwin	7"
2003	Archaische Arbeiten	2xLP, limited to 600 copies.
2003	Flamme	2xLP
2003	Funke/El Astro Rey	7", limited to 1,000 copies. Split with the group Ô Paradis.
2003	Pedra	CD5", limited to 500 copies. DVD case.
2004	Flamme	CD
2004	Gefiederte Träume	LP
2004	Heimliche Welt	2xLP, limited to 600 copies. Gatefold sleeve.
2004	Sturmlieder	2xLP, limited to 600 copies. Gatefold sleeve.
2005	Gotos=Kalanda	2xLP, limited to 600 copies. Gatefold sleeve.
2005	Knospe	7", limited to 600 copies.
2005	Edelweiss	CD
2007	Hallstatt	CD
2010	Rauhe Schale	CD
2015	Terra Incognita	CD
2017	Dunkelgraue Lieder	CD
2019	Chairete Daimones	CD/LP/MC
