= Zueignung =

Lied composed by Richard Strauss

- Lied by Richard Strauss
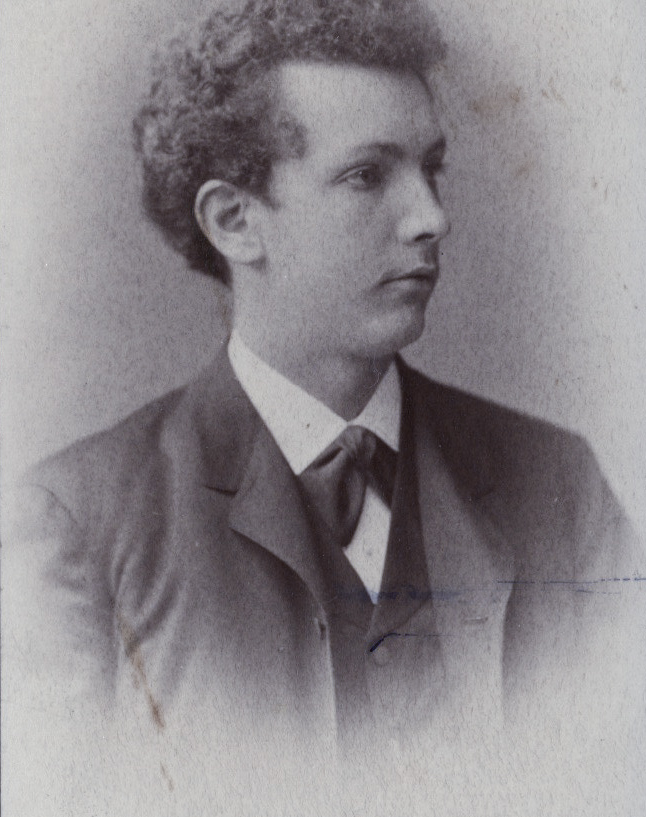
- The composer in 1886
- English: Dedication
- Opus: 10
- Text: Poem by Hermann von Gilm
- Language: German
- Composed: 1885
- Dedication: Heinrich Vogl
- Scoring: Voice and piano

"Zueignung" (translated as "Dedication" or "Devotion") is a Lied composed by Richard Strauss in 1885 (completed 13 August), setting a poem by the Austrian poet Hermann von Gilm. It was included in Strauss's first published collection of songs, as Op. 10 in 1885. Originally scored for voice and piano, the song was orchestrated in 1932 by the German conductor Robert Heger and in 1940 by Strauss himself. It is one of the composer's best-known songs.

== History ==
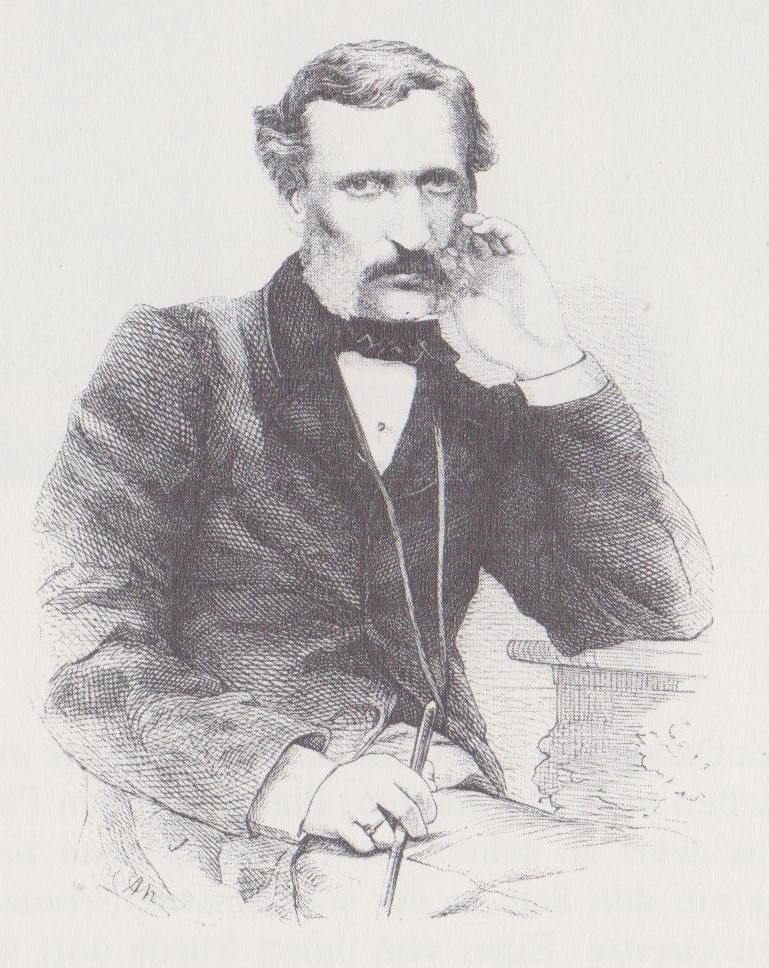
Hermann von Gilm, the author of the lyrics. Engraving by Adolf Neumann

In 1882, his friend Ludwig Thuile introduced Strauss to the poetry of Gilm contained in the volume Letzte Blätter (last leaves), published in the year of the poet's death (and the composer's birth) 1864. However, the original Gilm poem was not contained in this volume, and the original title of Gilm's poem was the refrain "Habe Dank" ("have thanks" or "take thanks"). The Opus 10 songs were all written for the tenor voice, which caused some trouble in the Strauss family, since his father Franz wanted him to write his first published songs for his Aunt Johanna as thanks for all of her help with his musical development. The song was dedicated to the principal tenor of the Munich Court Opera, Heinrich Vogl. Strauss promised to later write some songs for Aunt Johanna. "Zueignung" was the first of eight songs by Strauss published as Op. 10, which were all settings of Gilm's poems. In 1885, they were the first songs Strauss ever published. The song was given its first public performance at Meiningen in a chamber concert on 5 March 1886 (along with three other Opus 10 songs "Nichts", "Allerseelen", and "Georgine") sung by the tenor Rudolf Engelhardt.

In 1897, John Bernhoff wrote an English version of the lyrics, which were published as a bilingual “Universal Edition” by his publishers (Joseph Aible Verlag, Leipzig).

The song was orchestrated by the German conductor Robert Heger in 1932. In June 1940, Richard Strauss orchestrated the song for Viorica Ursuleac. Strauss altered the music slightly and also added an extra line "Du wunderbare Helena" (you wonderful Helena), referring to her singing of the title role in his opera Die ägyptische Helena at the Salzburg Festival in 1933. The Strauss orchestration was premiered at Rome on 4 July 1940 with Ursulaec singing and her husband Clemens Krauss conducting.

Strauss recorded the song three times with himself on the piano; in 1919 with the baritone Heinrich Schlusnus and twice in 1942 from Vienna for wartime radio broadcasts with soprano Maria Reining and tenor Anton Dermota.

== Lyrics ==
Zueignung

Ja, du weißt es, teure Seele,
Daß ich fern von dir mich quäle,
Liebe macht die Herzen krank,
Habe Dank.

Einst hielt ich, der Freiheit Zecher,
Hoch den Amethysten-Becher,
Und du segnetest den Trank,
Habe Dank.

Und beschworst darin die Bösen,
Bis ich, was ich nie gewesen,
heilig, heilig an's Herz dir sank,
Habe Dank.

Devotion

Ah, thou know'st, sweet, all mine anguish,
In thine absence, how I languish
Love brings sorrow to the heart!
Thanks, sweet heart!

Once, when merry songs were ringing
I to liberty was drinking,
Thou a blessing didst impart.
Thanks, sweet heart!

Thou didst lay those wanton spirits;
Comfort, peace my soul inherits,
Joy and bliss shall thy love impart.
Thanks, sweet heart!

Dedication (Note: Fairly literal translation)

Well you know, o dearest soul,
That far from you I torment myself,
Love doth make the heart grow sick,
Have my thanks.

Revelling in freedom, once I held
Aloft the goblet made of amethyst,
And you gave that drink a blessing,
Have my thanks.

And therein you conjured bad times,
Till I, (where I had never been before)
Sank, holy, holy, into your embrace,
Have my thanks.

== Orchestral arrangements ==
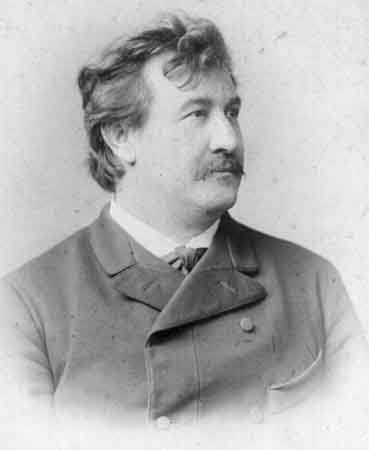
Heinrich Vogl in 1886, the tenor to whom the song was dedicated

The 1940 orchestration by Strauss was completed at Garmisch on 19 June 1940. The following instrumentation is employed.

- Two flutes, two oboes, two clarinets, three bassoons
- Four french horns, three trumpets
- Timpani
- Two harps
- Strings

The 1932 orchestration by Heger has the following instrumentation:

- Two flutes, two oboes, two clarinets, bass clarinet, two bassoons
- Four french horns, two trumpets, one trombone
- Timpani
- One harp
- Strings
