= Die Nacht (Strauss) =

- Lied by Richard Strauss
- The Starry Night by Vincent van Gogh, 1889
- English: The Night
- Catalogue: TrV 141
- Opus: 10
- Text: Poem by Hermann von Gilm
- Language: German
- Composed: 1885
- Dedication: Heinrich Vogl
- Scoring: Voice and piano

"Die Nacht" ("The Night") is an art song composed by Richard Strauss in 1885, setting a poem by the Austrian poet Hermann von Gilm. It was included in the first collection of songs Strauss ever published, as Op. 10 in 1885 (which also included "Zueignung"). The song is written for voice and piano.

== Composition history ==
In 1882, his friend Ludwig Thuile introduced Strauss to the poetry of Gilm contained in the volume Letzte Blätter (last leaves), published in the year of the poet's death (and the composer's birth) 1864, which contained the poem Die Nacht. The Opus 10 songs were all intended for the tenor voice. Alan Jefferson wrote:

Die Nacht is a song of trembling and yearning, a song tinged with fear that the night, which takes away the familiar shapes of daylight, will also steal the beloved...Strauss manages to convey the manner in which the all-embracing power of night is stealing so mercilessly over everything: first by the a powerful (though gentle) rhythmic beat; and then by the minor seconds (two adjacent black and white notes put down together) which create the effect of merging two objects into one until they resolve into something else, musically as well as visually...Die Nacht is a supreme example of Strauss's art.

Norman Del Mar notes that the opening musical phrase for the line "Aus dem Walde tritt die Nacht" is very similar to the "wonderful oboe solo from Don Juan, to be composed five years later".

Strauss recorded the song twice with himself at the piano: in 1919 with the Baritone Heinrich Schlusnus, and again for a 1942 wartime radio broadcast from Vienna with tenor Anton Dermota.

== Lyrics ==
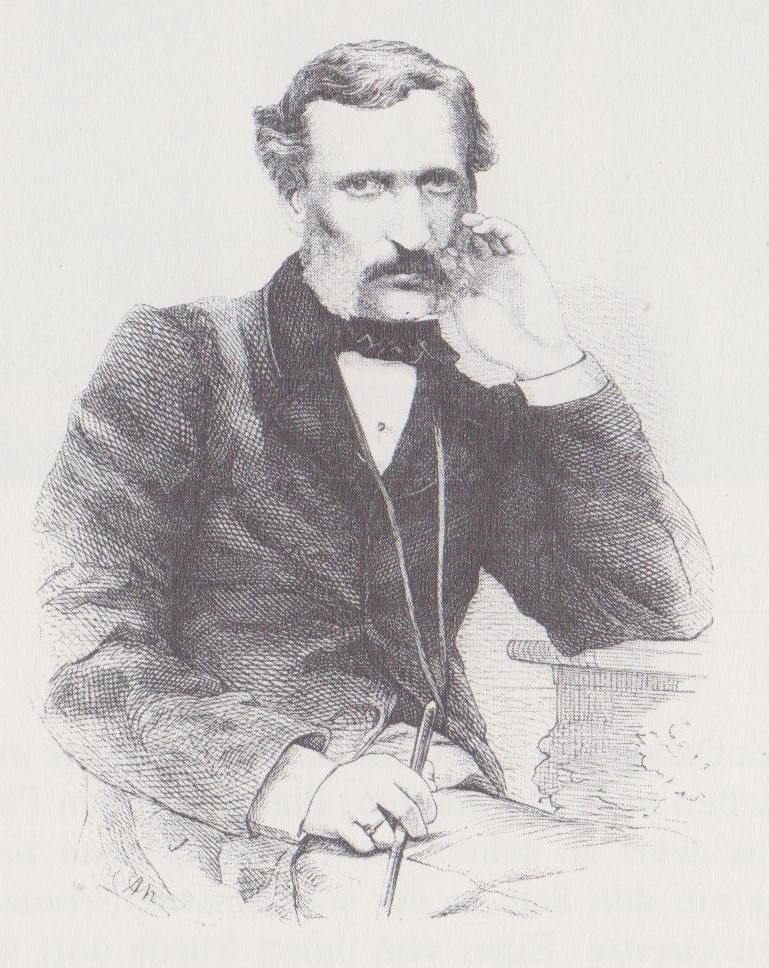
Hermann von Gilm, the author of the lyrics

Die Nacht

Aus dem Walde tritt die Nacht,
Aus den Bäumen schleicht sie leise,
Schaut sich um in weitem Kreise,
Nun gib acht.

Alle Lichter dieser Welt,
Alle Blumen, alle Farben
Löscht sie aus und stiehlt die Garben
Weg vom Feld.

Alles nimmt sie, was nur hold,
Nimmt das Silber weg des Stroms,
Nimmt vom Kupferdach des Doms
Weg das Gold.

Ausgeplündert steht der Strauch,
Rücke näher, Seel an Seele;
O die Nacht, mir bangt, sie stehle
Dich mir auch.

The Night

Out of the forest steps Night,
Out of the trees she softly steals,
Looks around her in a wide arc,
Now beware..

All the lights of this world,
All flowers, all colors
She extinguishes, and steals the sheaves
From the field.

She takes everything that is dear,
Takes the silver from the stream,
and from the Cathedral's copper roof,
She takes the gold.

The bushes are left, stripped naked,
Come closer, soul to soul;
Oh, I fear that the night will also steal
You from me.
