= Trude Eipperle =

German operatic soprano

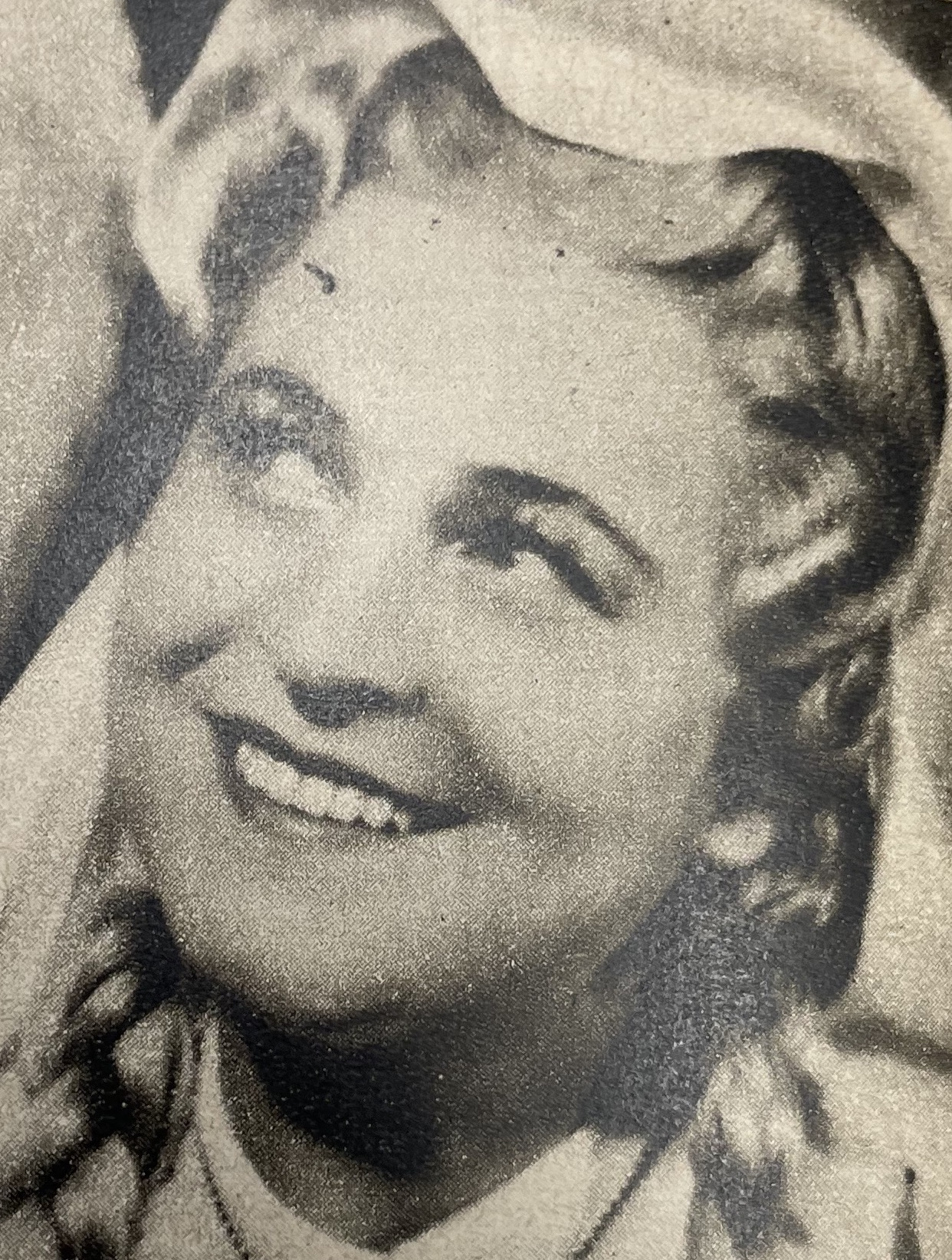
Image of Trude Eipperle

Trude Eipperle (27 January 1908 – 18 October 1997) was a German operatic soprano.

== Life ==
Born in Stuttgart, Eipperle studied at the Musikhochschule in her native Stuttgart, and made her stage debut in Wiesbaden, in 1930. She sang in Nuremberg (1930–34), Brunswick (1934–37), Munich (1938–44), Cologne (1945–51), and Stuttgart from 1951 onwards. She also appeared at the Salzburg Festival in 1942.

She made guest appearances in Vienna, Milan, Barcelona, Lisbon, Brussels, Monte Carlo, Paris and London.

Her repertory included Countess Almaviva, Pamina, Agathe, Elisabeth, Elsa, Eva, Marschallin, Arabella, Empress/Kaiserin (Die Frau ohne Schatten), but she was also admired as Desdemona in Verdi's Otello, Mimi in La boheme, and Cio-Cio-San in Madama Butterfly.

== Selected discography ==
- Lohengrin – Peter Anders, Trude Eipperle, Helena Braun, Carl Kronenberg, Josef Greindl, Gunther Ambrosius, Cologne Radio Chorus and Orchestra, Richard Kraus; Cantus Classics (1951)
- Die Boheme – Trude Eipperle, Karl Terkal, Wilma Lipp, Alfred Poell, Hans-Hermann Nissen, Georg Wieter, Munich Radio Chorus and Orchestra, Clemens Krauss; Cantus Classics (1951)

== Sources ==
- Grove Music Online, Elizabeth Forbes, May 2008.
