= Kadmon =

Kadmon may refer to:

- Adam Kadmon, in Kabbalah
- Kadmon Corporation
- Kadmon, an Austrian musician, see Allerseelen (band)

== See also ==
- Kadmonites
- Cadmus, also spelled Kadmos
