= Allerseelen (Strauss) =

Lied by Richard Strauss

- Lied by Richard Strauss
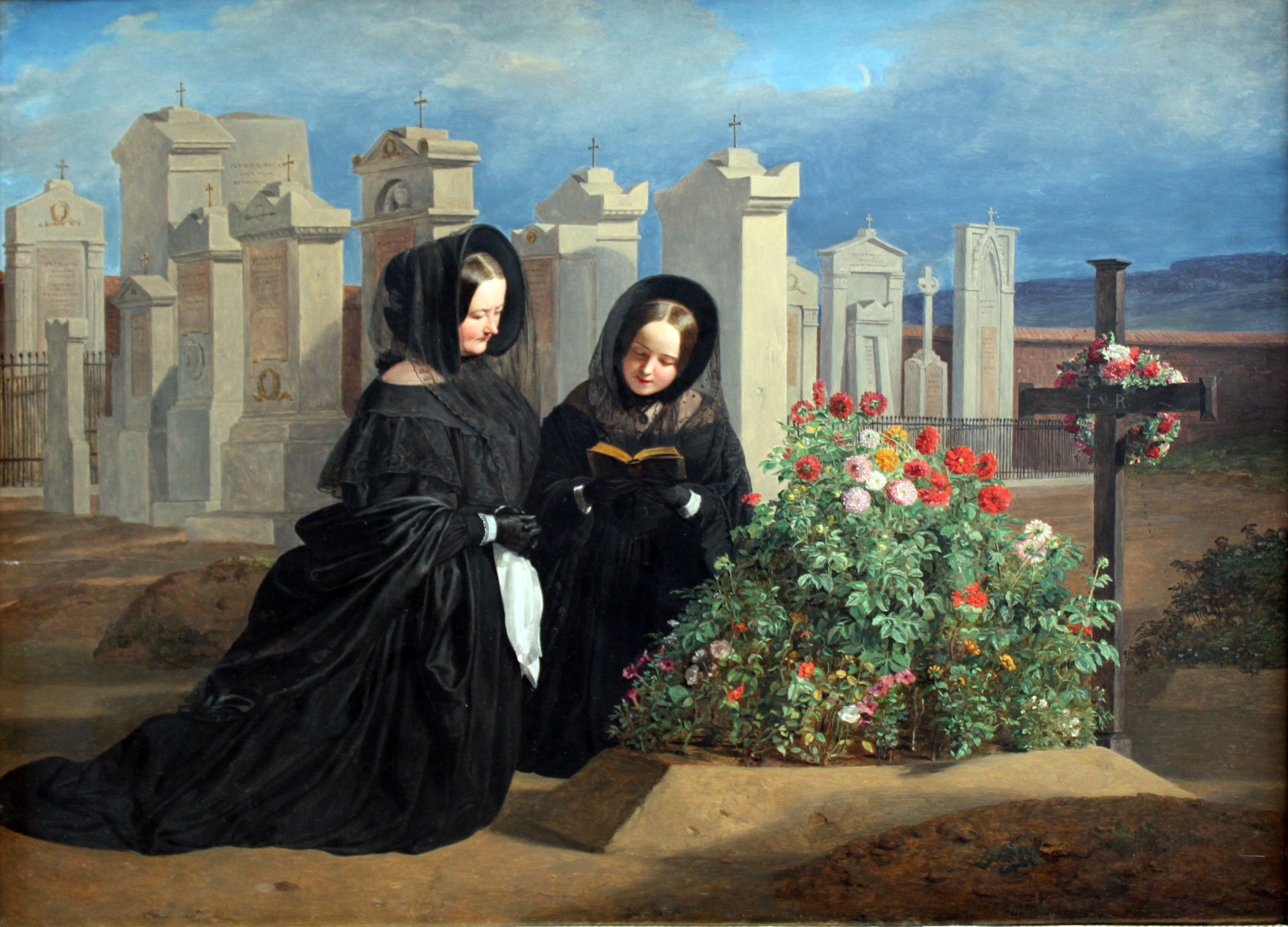
- Am Allerseelentag, by Ferdinand Georg Waldmüller, 1839
- English: All Souls' Day
- Catalogue: TrV 141
- Opus: 10, No. 8
- Text: Poem by Hermann von Gilm
- Language: German
- Composed: 31 October 1885
- Dedication: Heinrich Vogl
- Scoring: Voice and piano

"Allerseelen" ("All Souls' Day") is an art song for voice and piano composed by Richard Strauss in 1885, setting a poem by the Austrian poet Hermann von Gilm from his collection Letzte Blätter (Last Pages). It is the last in a collection of eight songs which were all settings of Gilm poems from the same volume entitled Acht Lieder aus Letzte Blätter (Eight Songs from Last Pages), the first collection of songs Strauss ever published as Op. 10 in 1885, also including "Zueignung" (Dedication) and "Die Nacht" (The Night). The song was orchestrated in 1932 by German conductor Robert Heger.

== Composition history ==
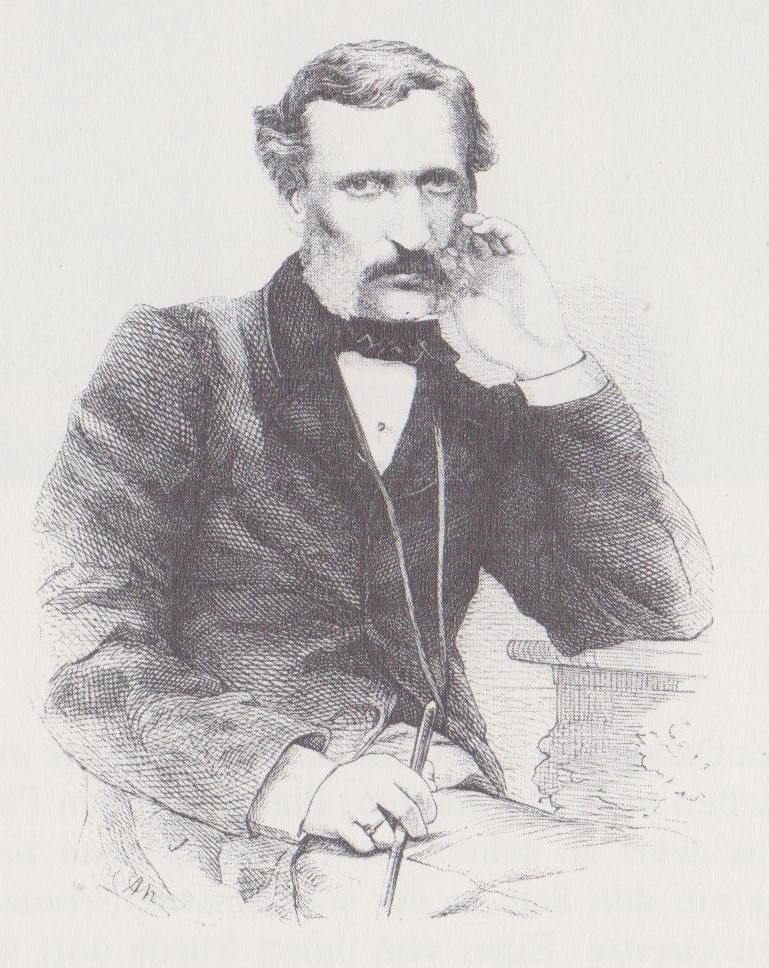
Hermann von Gilm, the author of the lyrics

In 1882, Strauss' friend, Ludwig Thuile, introduced Strauss to the poetry of Gilm contained in the volume Letzte Blätter (Last Pages), published in the year of the poet's death, (and the composer's birth), 1864, which contained the poem, Allerseelen. The Opus 10 songs were all intended for the tenor voice and were dedicated to the principal tenor of the Munich Court Opera, Heinrich Vogl. Gilm's poem Allerseelen was well known in Germany; Eduard Lassen had set it several years previously. Strauss completed the song on 3 October 1885, whilst at Meiningen, where he had started his first job as conductor under Hans von Bülow. The song was given its first public performance at Meiningen in a chamber concert on 5 March 1886, (along with three other Opus 10 songs ("Zueignung" ("Dedication"), "Nichts" ("Nothing"), and "Die Georgine" ("The Dahlia")), sung by the tenor Rudolf Engelhardt. Although Strauss originally conceived of the song for a tenor voice, he did perform it as accompanist to his wife, Pauline in two concerts in Brussels, in November 1896, and other concerts around Germany in 1898 and 1899. In 1921, during his US tour, he also performed it with the soprano Elena Gerhardt. Strauss conducted the song for a live radio concert recorded with Soprano Annette Brun and the Orchestra della Svizzera Italiana on 11 June 1947.

Interpretations of the poem are various. All Souls' Day, 2 November, is the day of the year when people commemorate and recall those dear to them who have died. Alan Jefferson argues that "...the singer's character is trying to take advantage of the day to revive an old love affair which, it seems, has also died." Others see it more as a supernatural encounter: either the dead lover is communicating with the person setting the table or the singer is communicating with a departed lover. Norman Del Mar, when discussing the Opus 10 collection, states that "Lastly comes the ever-popular Allerseelen... a broad effusion of Strauss' growing lyricism".

== Lyrics ==
Allerseelen

Stell auf den Tisch die duftenden Reseden,
Die letzten roten Astern trag herbei,
Und laß uns wieder von der Liebe reden,
Wie einst im Mai.

Gib mir die Hand, daß ich sie heimlich drücke
Und wenn man's sieht, mir ist es einerlei,
Gib mir nur einen deiner süßen Blicke,
Wie einst im Mai.

Es blüht und duftet heut auf jedem Grabe,
Ein Tag im Jahre ist ja den Toten frei,
Komm an mein Herz, daß ich dich wieder habe,
Wie einst im Mai.

All Souls Day

Place on the table the fragrant mignonettes,
Bring in the last red asters,
and let us talk of love again,
as once we did in May.

Give me your hand, so that I may secretly press it;
and if someone sees, it's all one to me.
Just give me one of your sweet glances,
as once you did in May.

Flowers bloom and spread their fragrance today on every grave;
one day in the year is sacred for the dead.
Come close to my heart, so that I can have you again,
as once I did in May.

== Orchestral arrangements ==
The 1932 orchestration by Heger has the following instrumentation:

- Two flutes, two oboes, two clarinets, bass clarinet, two bassoons
- Four french horns, two trumpets, one trombone
- Timpani
- One harp
- Strings

"Heger's version was acceptable to Strauss, and indeed he conducted it at his own concerts". In 1947 he made a live recording with this version.

There are instrumental arrangements for Brass band, including one by Stephen Roberts published in 2006.
