= Louise Cook =

Louise Cook may refer to:

- Louise Cook (rally driver)
- Louise Cook (humanitarian)
