= Gwyneth Jones (soprano) =

Welsh soprano (born 1936)

Dame Gwyneth Jones DBE
- Jones in Paris, 2002
- Born: 7 November 1936 (age 90); Pontnewynydd, Monmouthshire, Wales
- Education: Royal College of Music; Accademia Musicale Chigiana
- Occupation: Dramatic soprano
- Organizations: Zurich Opera; Royal Opera House; Vienna State Opera; Bayreuth Festival
- Title: Kammersängerin
- Awards: Order of Merit of the Federal Republic of Germany; Ordre des Arts et des Lettres

Dame Gwyneth Jones (born 7 November 1936) is a Welsh dramatic soprano, widely regarded as one of the greatest Wagnerian sopranos of the second half of the 20th century. Her powerful dramatic soprano voice was joined to a vivid stage presence and finely developed acting ability. She appeared at major opera houses of the world, and had a long relationship with the Bayreuth Festival where she developed a more human, vulnerable, and womanly image for Wagner's leading characters. She is best known for her rendition of Brünnhilde in the 1976 Jahrhundertring at Bayreuth, staged to commemorate the festival's centenary.

== Life and career ==
Jones was born in Pontnewynydd, Monmouthshire, Wales, on 7 November 1936. She sang in local choirs in the alto section. Before becoming a professional singer, she worked as a secretary at the Pontypool foundry. She studied voice, as a mezzo-soprano, at the Royal College of Music in London with Arnold Smith and Ruth Packer, supported by a scholarship from her county. She studied further at the Accademia Musicale Chigiana in Siena, at the Opera Centre of Herbert Graf in Zurich, and with Maria Carpi in Geneva.

Jones became a member of the Zurich Opera, making her stage debut in 1962 as Annina in Der Rosenkavalier by R. Strauss. She also appeared as Orfeo in Gluck's Orfeo ed Euridice and as Magdelene in Wagner's Die Meistersinger von Nürnberg. She portrayed Lady Macbeth in Verdi's Macbeth at the Welsh National Opera in 1963. The same year, she took part in the world premiere of Rudolf Kelterborn's Die Errettung Thebens in Zurich, as Manto. Her voice teacher in Zurich and Nello Santi, then music director of the opera, thought that she had a soprano voice, and she tried singing soprano. Her first major soprano role was Amelia in Verdi's Un ballo in maschera in 1964.

She became a member of the Royal Opera House in London in 1964, engaged by Georg Solti. She rose to prominence there when she stood in for Leontyne Price as Leonora in Verdi's Il trovatore. There she performed roles including the title roles in Der Rosenkavalier and Leonore in Beethoven's Fidelio. In 1965, she first tackled a Wagner role there, Sieglinde in Die Walküre. Her voice then had volume and projection, without the "steel" of many Wagnerian sopranos, but round and soft.

She first performed at the Vienna State Opera in 1966, also becoming a member of the organisation. In the first year there she portrayed Leonore in Fidelio, Amelia, Desdemona in Verdi's Otello, and Senta in Wagner's Der fliegende Holländer. In the following years she appeared there as Verdi's Aida, the title role of Der Rosenkavalier, Elisabetta in Verdi's Don Carlo, and as Puccini's Tosca. In the 1970s she performed there as Donna Anna in Mozart's Don Giovanni, and in Strauss roles, the title roles of Salome, Die ägyptische Helena and Ariadne auf Naxos, as Chrysothemis in Elektra and as the Marschallin in Der Rosenkavalier.

From 1966 she appeared frequently as a guest, in Rome as a soloist in Verdi's Requiem, in Geneva as Desdemona, at the Bavarian State Opera and the Deutsche Oper Berlin. She appeared at the Dallas Opera as Lady Macbeth, and in the title role of Cherubini's Médée for the American Opera Society. She first performed at La Scala in Milan as Leonora in Il trovatore on 4 April 1967.

=== Bayreuth ===
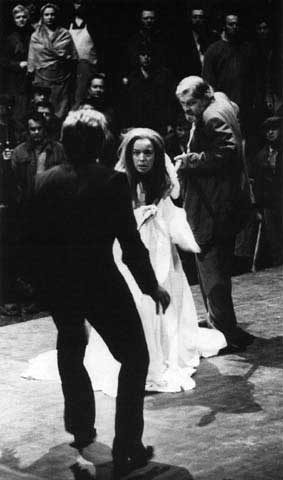
Gwyneth Jones at the Bayreuth Festival as Brünnhilde in the Jahrhundertring, first shown in 1976 and filmed in 1980

One of her most noted achievements was her portrayal of Brünnhilde in the Bayreuth Festival's Jahrhundertring (Centenary Ring) in 1976, celebrating the centenary of both the festival and the first performance of the complete cycle, conducted by Pierre Boulez and staged by Patrice Chéreau. Jones had sung her first Brünnhilde at Bayreuth in 1974, and her first complete Ring cycle there in 1975, both as preparation for the new production. Originally controversial, the production was later celebrated and was recorded and filmed for commercial release in 1979 and 1980. It was also broadcast on European television stations, which brought her performance to wide audiences. The recording won a Grammy Award for Best Opera Recording in 1983. Volkmar Fischer noted that she played the character with a grace suggesting sadness, dignity, confusion and tenderness. Jens Malte Fischer wrote for the Frankfurter Allgemeine Zeitung that she expressed the different stages of the character with tireless intensity, leaving a reference interpretation for singers of Brünnhilde to come.

Her career at Bayreuth Festival, to which she was frequently invited, is as follows:

- 1966: Sieglinde in Die Walküre
- 1968: Eva in Die Meistersinger von Nürnberg
- 1969: Senta in Der fliegende Holländer, Kundry in Parsifal
- 1970: Sieglinde, Senta, Kundry
- 1971: Sieglinde, Senta
- 1972: Elisabeth and Venus in Tannhäuser, Sieglinde
- 1973: Elisabeth and Venus, Sieglinde
- 1974: Elisabeth and Venus, Brünnhilde in Götterdämmerung
- 1975: Brünnhilde in Der Ring des Nibelungen
- 1976: Brünnhilde (Jahrhundertring)
- 1977: Brünnhilde, Elisabeth and Venus
- 1978: Brünnhilde
- 1979: Brünnhilde
- 1980: Brünnhilde
- 1982: Senta

=== Later career ===
At the Bavarian State Opera, Jones portrayed the Marschallin in Der Rosenkavalier with conductor Carlos Kleiber in 1972, directed by Otto Schenk, with Brigitte Fassbaender in the title role and Lucia Popp as Sophie. The conductor helped her to understand and express the ambivalence of the character between cheerful laughter and tears. She returned to the house as Leonora in Il trovatore, Aida, Lady Macbeth, Helena and Turandot.

On 24 November 1972, Jones made her debut at the Metropolitan Opera (Met) of New York City as Sieglinde in Die Walküre. Until her last appearance at the Met on 22 April 1995, as Kundry in Parsifal, she sang 11 roles in 10 operas in 93 performances at the Met, including Leonore in Fidelio, Isolde in Wagner's Tristan und Isolde, and the title roles of Salome and Puccini's Turandot; her most frequent role was the Marschallin in Der Rosenkavalier, performed 20 times.

Jones performed as Poppea in Monteverdi's L'incoronazione di Poppea at the Paris Opéra in 1977. In August 1979, she made her debut at the Salzburg Festival as the Marschallin. She portrayed Elisabetta in Don Carlos at the Cologne Opera. In 1980 she appeared there as the Dyer's Wife in Die Frau ohne Schatten in a production by Jean-Pierre Ponnelle, conducted by John Pritchard, with Walter Berry as the Dyer, Róbert Ilosfalvy as the Emperor, Siv Wennberg as the Empress, and Helga Dernesch as the Nurse. She returned to the house in 1984 for the title role of Elektra, another of her later signature roles. In a 1985 performance in Zurich of Die Frau ohne Schatten, she was planned to appear as the Dyer's wife, but when the singer of the Empress cancelled, performed that role in addition at the same performance.

In 1984 Jones first performed as Turandot, in Los Angeles with the ensemble of the Royal Opera House. It became one of the roles she successfully took to other venues, such as the festival at the Baths of Caracalla in Rome, at the opening performance of the Pittsburgh Opera in 1987, at the Royal Opera House in 1990, and in Vienna. She appeared in Vienna also as Leonora in Il trovatore, Puccini's Madama Butterfly, the Dyer's Wife, Elektra, Santuzza in Mascagni's Cavalleria rusticana, and as Isolde.

Jones performed at the Dresden State Opera in 1996 as Kostelnicka in Janáček's Jenůfa. The same year she first portrayed Bellini's Norma. In 1997, she performed as Ortrud in Wagner's Lohengrin at the Royal Opera House, and as Gertrud in Humperdinck's Hänsel und Gretel at the Théâtre du Châtelet in Paris. At the 1998 Salzburg Festival she performed as Widow Begbick in Weill's Rise and Fall of the City of Mahagonny. She portrayed Brünnhilde in a Ring cycle at the Royal Opera House in 1991. The same year, she first portrayed Minnie in Puccini's La fanciulla del West, at the Orange County Performing Arts Center alongside Plácido Domingo. In February 2008 she sang the role of Herodias in Stephen Langridge's production of Salome at Malmö Opera. She performed the role at the Vienna State Opera in May 2012. In March 2016, she made her debut as the Countess in Tchaikovsky's The Queen of Spades in a new production of the opera at the Staatstheater Braunschweig. In April 2017, she took on the speaking part of the Narrator in Richard Strauss's Enoch Arden in a concert in Landsberg.

=== Concerts and film ===
Jones performed in concerts and lieder recitals, television and radio broadcasts and participated in several film projects, including the epic television series Wagner, in which she played the first Isolde, Malvina Schnorr von Carolsfeld. She has also devised for herself a couple of music-theatrical shows – Oh Malvina! and Die Frau im Schatten – which are inspired by real historical characters, namely, Malvina Schnorr von Carolsfeld and Pauline de Ahna (wife of Richard Strauss). The soprano part in the Symphony No. 9, titled "Vision of Eternity", by Welsh composer Alun Hoddinott was written for and premiered by her. In June 2007, she created the role of the Queen of Hearts in the world premiere of Unsuk Chin's Alice in Wonderland at the Bavarian State Opera. In August 2010 she sang the role of Herodias in Salome, alongside the Salome of Deborah Voigt, in a concert performance at the Verbier Festival. She took part in a piece of musical theatre about the women of the Wagner clan and their influences on the Bayreuth Festival entitled Wagnerin. Ein Haus der Kunstmusik, directed by Sven Holm at the 2012 Munich Opera Festival, playing Cosima Wagner.

=== Other activities ===
In 2003, Jones made her debut as director and costume designer in a stage production of Der fliegende Holländer in Weimar, Germany. She has also given master classes for young singers at notable venues and colleges of music, and acted as an adjudicator in international vocal competitions, including the 2009 BBC Cardiff Singer of the World competition, the 2017 season of the operatic singing competition on the Russia-Kultura TV Channel, "The Big Opera" (the whole series of competition now being available for viewing on YouTube), and, more recently, the International Vocal Competition in 's-Hertogenbosch 2024. She has been the President of the Wagner Society of Great Britain since 1990.

Jones made a guest appearance in Quartet, a film by Dustin Hoffman, based on the comedy by Ronald Harwood about several retired opera singers planning to put on a concert to celebrate Verdi's birthday. She takes on the role of Anne Langley, a former operatic rival to Jean Horton, played by Dame Maggie Smith. The film was premiered to largely favourable reviews on 9 September at the 2012 Toronto International Film Festival, and Jones's performance was critically acclaimed.

=== Personal life ===
Jones married the stage director Till Haberfeld in 1966; they had one child.

=== Awards ===
She was made Commander of the Order of the British Empire (CBE) in 1976 and was promoted to Dame Commander of the Order of the British Empire (DBE) in 1986. She is also the recipient of numerous musical/cultural awards and honours from many different countries and organisations, including the Order of Merit of the Federal Republic of Germany, the Golden Medal of Honour in Vienna, the Austrian Cross of Honour First Class, the Shakespeare Prize and the Puccini Award.

Jones is a Kammersängerin at both the Vienna State Opera and the Bavarian State Opera She has been made a Commandeur de L'Ordre des Arts et des Lettres in France. She has been conferred honorary doctorates by the University of Wales and the University of Glamorgan.

== Recordings ==
- Gwyneth Jones: Operatic Recital (Classic Recitals series). Arias from Fidelio, Médée, Der fliegende Holländer, Il trovatore and La forza del destino, plus Beethoven's concert aria "Ah! perfido". Vienna Opera Orchestra, cond. Argeo Quadri (Decca/Philips 475 6412 6 DM), originally Decca 1967 OCLC 634493471
- Gwyneth Jones: Scenes from Verdi: Arias from Aida, Don Carlo, Macbeth, Otello. Orchestra of the Royal Opera House. cond. Edward Downes. Decca 1969. OCLC 1274693280
- Gwyneth Jones sings Strauss Lieder: including "Zueignung", "Die Nacht", "Allerseelen", "Cäcilie", pianist Geoffrey Parsons. Capriccio 1989. OCLC 767866007
- Gwyneth Jones sings Strauss: Vier letzte Lieder. Tokyo Symphony Orchestra, cond. Roberto Paternostro. Koch Schwann 1991. OCLC 25539538
- Gwyneth Jones sings Wagner: Scenes from Tannhäuser, Lohengrin, Tristan und Isolde, Götterdämmerung. WDR Symphony Orchestra Cologne, cond. Paternostro. Chandos 1991. OCLC 811239874
- Beethoven, Symphony No. 9: Wiener Philharmoniker, cond. Karl Böhm. Deutsche Grammophon 1970 OCLC 725272953
- Beethoven, Symphony No. 9: Konzertvereinigung Wiener Staatsopernchor, Wiener Philharmoniker, cond. Leonard Bernstein. Deutsche Grammophon 1979 OCLC 1192476304
- Mahler, Symphony No. 8: London Symphony Orchestra, cond. Bernstein. Sony Classical 1966 OCLC 1268542821
- Sibelius, Tone Poems and Songs: London Symphony Orchestra, Scottish National Orchestra, Wiener Philharmoniker, BBC Symphony Orchestra, cond. Antal Doráti, Alexander Gibson, Sir Malcolm Sargent. EMI 1969 (this included the world premiere recording of Sibelius's Luonnotar, sung by Jones) OCLC 1183774246
- Mendelssohn, Elijah: New Philharmonia Orchestra, cond. Rafael Frühbeck de Burgos. EMI 1968 OCLC 815764685
- Operafest – A Gala Concert at the Zurich Opera House: Zurich Opera House, cond. Ferdinand Leitner, Ralf Weikert, Andre Presser. Video Artists International (DVD) OCLC 1176032604
- Gwyneth Jones in Concert (live concert 23.8.88) VAI DVD. VAI OCLC 62792290
- 10,000 Voices: The World Choir and others, cond. Owain Arwel Hughes. EMI OCLC 1581728249
- Le Donne di Puccini: Munich Radio Orchestra, cond. García Navarro. Nightingale OCLC 1183630975
- L'Art du Chant: Les Sopranes: DVD. Le Coulisses de L'Opera OCLC 493985600
- Wagner, Götterdämmerung (Act 3): Orchestra of the Royal Opera House, cond. Georg Solti. Testament OCLC 1393363559

=== Complete opera recordings (commercially released) ===
- Fidelio (Böhm / DG (DVD)) OCLC 723971127
- Fidelio (Böhm / DG (cd)) OCLC 1183763714
- Leonore (1805) (Melles / Orfeo (cd)) OCLC 1255717650
- Macbeth (Kuhn / Sine qua non (cd)) OCLC 1056778335
- Aïda (Muti / Bella Voce (cd)) OCLC 914790526
- Otello (Barbirolli / EMI (cd)) OCLC 820477091
- Salome (Böhm / DG (cd)) OCLC 839040621
- Elektra (Tate / Claves (cd)) OCLC 237044249
- Der Rosenkavalier (Kleiber / DG (DVD)) OCLC 62060801
- Der Rosenkavalier (Bernstein / Sony (cd)) OCLC 1575848350
- Die ägyptische Helena (Doráti / DG (cd)) OCLC 1184705039
- Die ägyptische Helena (Krips / RCA Victor(cd)) OCLC 163293741
- Der fliegende Holländer (Böhm / DG (cd)) OCLC 1183744619
- Lohengrin (Kubelík / DG (cd)) OCLC 1183577932
- Tannhäuser (Davis / DG (DVD)) OCLC 260005326
- Tristan und Isolde (Kout / ArtHaus (DVD)) OCLC 610663300
- Der Ring des Nibelungen (Boulez / DG (DVD), Philips (cd)) OCLC 1027523933
- Götterdämmerung (Solti / Decca (cd)) OCLC 1393363559
- Parsifal (Boulez / DG (cd)) OCLC 248432558
- Notre Dame (Perick / Capriccio (cd)) OCLC 704918765
- Hänsel und Gretel (Davis / Philips (cd)) OCLC 745399952
- La fanciulla del West (Viotti / Sine qua non (cd)) OCLC 633738300
- Aufstieg und Fall der Stadt Mahagonny (Russell Davies / ArtHaus (DVD)) OCLC 912883623
- Médée (Gardelli / Decca (cd)) OCLC 644154720
- Alice in Wonderland (Nagano / Medici Arts (DVD)) OCLC 852795951
- Die Meistersinger von Nürnberg (Böhm / Orfeo (cd)) OCLC 990058584
- Il Trovatore (Giulini / Royal Opera House Heritage Series (cd)) OCLC 555479268
