= Therese Vogl =

German operatic soprano

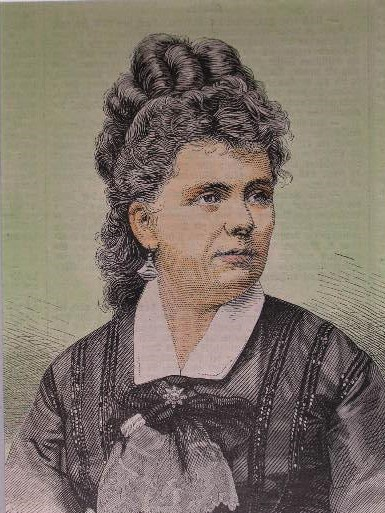
- Therese Vogl (1877)
- Born: Therese Thoma; November 12, 1845; Tutzing, Bavaria, Germany
- Died: September 29, 1921 (aged 75); Munich, Germany
- Occupation: operatic soprano
- Years active: 1865–1892
- Spouse: Heinrich Vogl

Therese (Thoma) Vogl (12 November 1845 – 29 September 1921) was a German operatic soprano, the first Wellgunde in Wagner's Das Rheingold, and the first Sieglinde in his Die Walküre.

== Life ==
Vogl was born Therese Thoma in Tutzing, Bavaria, where she also spent the last years of her life. In 1868, she married the leading dramatic tenor Heinrich Vogl and they henceforth appeared on stage together on many occasions. She died in Munich in 1921, having outlived her husband by more than 20 years. They are buried together in Tutzing.

== Career ==
Vogl studied at the Munich Conservatoire and made her operatic debut at the Karlsruhe Hoftheater in 1865. Her operatic debut at Munich came the following year, in the role of Casilda in a performance of Daniel Auber's La part du diable. She played the role of Sieglinde in Richard Wagner's Die Walküre at the Munich Court Opera on 26 June 1870, with husband Heinrich playing the role of Siegmund opposite her. She also undertook the role of Wellgunde in Wagner's Das Rheingold at Munich on 22 September 1869 – a performance in which her husband played the role of Loge.

She sang Munich's first Siegfried Brünnhilde on 10 June 1878, while her husband took the title role.

Therese and Heinrich Vogl were among the first performers to play the title parts in Tristan und Isolde, being highly regarded in those roles. She was also the first performer to play the role of Brünnhilde in the UK – at a performance of Ring cycle staged at London's Her Majesty's Theatre, with Anton Seidl conducting and her spouse singing Loge and Siegfried.

On the basis of these "Ring" performances in London, the influential critic Herman Klein described her voice as being a light dramatic soprano, similar to Christine Nilsson's, with a very clear head register and elegant phrasing and diction. Klein also described her final scene as Brünnhilde in Götterdämmerung as "thrilling". According to Klein, she was one of the finest artists among the early crop of Wagnerian dramatic sopranos but her and her husband's opportunities to appear at the Bayreuth Festival dried up after they quarreled with the Wagner family.

She retired from the operatic stage in 1892 as her voice had begun showing signs of deterioration. Her final performance was as Isolde, in Munich.
