= Maria Reining =

Austrian opera singer

Maria Reining (August 7, 1903 in Vienna – March 11, 1991 in Deggendorf) was an Austrian soprano, honored with the title Kammersängerin.

At first, Reining worked in a Viennese bank, and she did not begin her singing career until the age of 28, at the Vienna State Opera, mainly in soubrette roles. Two years later, she moved to Darmstadt, then to the Munich State Opera, where she made her debut as Elsa in Lohengrin, under Hans Knappertsbusch. In 1937, she followed Knappertsbusch to the Vienna State Opera, where she sang Elsa again.

Reining was a member of the Vienna State Opera ensemble between 1931 and 1933 and again between 1937 and 1957. Between 1937 and 1941, she sang at the Salzburg Festival with great success, conducted, among others, by Arturo Toscanini.

Reining predominantly sang roles by Mozart, Wagner and Richard Strauss. As a guest, she appeared at the leading European opera houses; among others, she sang at the Royal Opera House in London and at La Scala in Milan. Reining also appeared as Ariadne and as the Marschallin at New York City Opera.

Reining died in 1991 in the Lower Bavarian town of Deggendorf, and was buried in Dornbach in Vienna.

There are a number of recordings of Reining: her Arabella (Salzburg, 1947, under Karl Böhm), Daphne (Vienna, 1944, Böhm), Ariadne (Vienna, 1944, Böhm), Eva in Die Meistersinger (Vienna, 1937, Toscanini), the Marschallin in Der Rosenkavalier (Salzburg, 1949, George Szell; Salzburg, 1953, Clemens Krauss; Vienna, 1954 (studio), Erich Kleiber; Vienna, 1955, Knappertsbusch) are all on disc. Reining also recorded the last scene of Die Walküre Act 1 as Sieglinde with Max Lorenz as Siegmund in Berlin in 1941 for Deutsche Schallplatten, conducted by Artur Rother: a fast-paced account full of energy and passion, and with impeccable diction from both singers. Reining recorded several Richard Strauss songs with the composer at the piano in Vienna during 1942, including "Zueignung", "Traum durch die Dämmerung" and "Cäcilie".

== Selected filmography ==
- Vienna Blood (1942)

== Sources ==
Most of the information in this article is taken from the German Wikipedia article.
