= Karl Terkal =

Austrian opera singer

Karl Terkal (7 October 1919 - 12 August 1996) was an Austrian operatic tenor, particularly associated with lyric roles of the German repertory, both opera and operetta.

Born in Vienna, Terkal was working as a furniture carpenter in Vienna, while taking voice lessons with Valerie Wilhelm. He later entered the Vienna Music Academy, where he was a pupil of Hermann Gallos. He made his stage debut in Graz, as Don Ottavio, in 1950, and remained there until 1952. He made his debut at the Vienna State Opera in 1951, again as Don Ottavio, under Clemens Krauss, and began a long association with that theatre that would last some thirty years. He also sang frequently at the Vienna Volksoper, where he became a great favorite in operetta. He was also a guest at the Bregenz Festival and Salzburg Festival.

He also made appearances in London, Rome, Milan, Naples, Palermo, Lisbon, etc. He excelled in lyric parts in opera by Mozart, Wagner, Strauss, Verdi and Puccini, as well as operetta by Johann Strauss, Franz Lehár, etc.

== Selected recordings ==
- 1951 - La bohème - Trude Eipperle, Karl Terkal, Wilma Lipp, Alfred Poell - Bavarian Radio Chorus and Orchestra, Clemens Krauss - Cantus Classic (sung in German)
- 1952 - Gräfin Mariza - Sena Jurinac, Karl Terkal, Anneliese Rothenberger, Rupert Glawitsch, Rundfunkorchester Hamburg, Wilhelm Stephan - Gala
- 1953 - La traviata - Teresa Stich-Randall, Karl Terkal, Robert Blasius - Cologne Radio Chorus and Orchestra, Mario Rossi - Cantus Classic (sung in German)
- 1956 - Die Frau ohne Schatten - Leonie Rysanek, Christel Goltz, Emmy Loose, Elisabeth Hongen, Hans Hopf, Karl Terkal, Paul Schöffler, Vienna Philharmonic, Karl Boehm - London
- 1959 - Die Fledermaus - Gerda Scheyer, Wilma Lipp, Christa Ludwig, Karl Terkal, Anton Dermota, Eberhard Wachter, Walter Berry - Philarmonia Chorus and Orchestra, Otto Ackermann - EMI Classics

== Sources ==
- Operissimo.com
