= The Duchess's Community High School =

Location
- Taylor Drive; Alnwick; Northumberland, NE66 2DH; England; 55.399629°N 1.700499°W

Information
- Type: Community school
- Established: 1809
- Founder: Duchess Julia Percy
- Local authority: Northumberland
- Department for Education URN: 122362 Tables
- Ofsted: Reports
- Headteacher: Mr James Wilson
- Gender: Co-educational
- Age: 11 to 18
- Enrolment: 1441 as of November 2019
- Capacity: 1651
- Website: http://www.dchs-alnwick.org/

The Duchess's Community High School is a co-educational secondary school and sixth form located in Alnwick in the English county of Northumberland. It is a community school administered by Northumberland County Council.

== History ==
In 1809, the Duchess of Northumberland, Julia opened a small private school for twenty girls, in one of her husband's houses in Walkergate, Alnwick. The numbers grew, so with 50 on roll, in 1820 it moved to larger premises on Canongate. In 1888 it move again to its home on Bailiffgate. It was a fee paying private school. In 1903 it was recognised by the Northumberland County Council as a County Secondary School. The school continued to expand and then named The Duchess’s Girls’ Grammar School. It moved in 1965 into newly built premises on Howling Lane.

In 1979, at the time of secondary reorganisation, the school became both comprehensive and co-educational as it incorporated the Duke’s Boys’ Grammar School, Alnwick Secondary Modern School, Seahouses Secondary Modern School, Glendale County Secondary School and St Mary’s RC Secondary Modern School.

The 940 pupil comprehensive needed to occupy both the 1965 Howling Lane building and the former building on Bailiffgate. In 2000 the school was designated a Technology College under the Specialist schools programme which allowed a widening of the curriculum and significant investment in ICT. Ofsted inspections in 2003, 2007 and 2012 reported positively. Because of the achievements the school was able to apply for a Second Specialism of Music and English College as well as continuing to offer Technology. It became a Full Service Extended School. In September 2016, and in September 2017 widened its age range, admitting pupils from the age of 11.

== The Site ==
Despite being one of the top-performing establishments in the county, by 2011, the buildings were aging. Being a split site was not ideal.

In May 2013, the Government announced that a new school would be funded through the £2 billion Priority School Building Programme, and is included in the first phase of the scheme. The leader of the county council, vowed that the authority would make up any shortfall. It opened in 2017.

Again the land for the Ńew Build was long-leased on a pepper-corn rent, by the Percy family, Dukes of Northumberland, maintaining their two century old connection with the school. The 20 acres (8.1 ha) site is valued at over £8 million- with it are a further 20 acres (8.1 ha) destined for sports fields and a sports centre for the town.

== Academics ==
The Duchess's Community High School offers GCSEs and BTEC qualifications as programmes of study for pupils, while students in the sixth form have the option to study from a range of A-levels and further BTECs.

=== Year 7, 8, 9 (Key Stage 3) ===
In Key Stage 3, all students study English, Mathematics, Science, IT, Technology, History, Geography, Art, Textiles, Drama, Music, PE, French and/or Spanish, RE and Life Studies.

=== Years 10 & 11 (Key Stage 4) ===
In Key Stage 3, students continue with English, English Literature, Mathematics, Science, Life Studies and PE. There are four options. Students are guided onto different academic routes and will choose an EBacc subject from History, Geography, French and Spanish, then three courses from a list that includes: The GCSE subjects, French, Spanish, Art, Photography, Geography, History, PE, RE, Computer Science, Film Studies, Drama, Music, Or BTEC Level 1 subjects, Business, Health & Social Care, IT, Engineering, Child Development & Care, Public Services, Hair & Beauty, Food Preparation & Nutrition, Materials Technology and Fashion & Textiles.

Many students continue into The Duchess’s Community High School Sixth Form.

=== Extra-curricular activities ===
- Sports.
- Creative Writing Club, Mass Debating & Magistrates Court, Extra Languages, French Puppet Theatre,
- Year 10/11 Extra Revision Morning sessions All Subjects,
- Textiles, Conservation Club, Key Project Fund, VEX Robotics, LEGO Robotics, Science Club
- Celidh Band, Dance, Set design, Capella Choir, Choir, Band Workshops.
- Theatricals an annual senior school play and the annual school musical with the performing on stage and in the technical lighting or sound side, stage management or publicity and photography.
- Maths Drop ins, Homework Club.

== Notable former pupils ==
- Lucy Bronze, footballer
- Ida Cook (pen name Mary Burchell) and Louise Cook, British Heroes of the Holocaust
- Laura Weightman, middle-distance runner
- Lucy Staniforth, footballer
- Cyrus Ramone Pattinson, boxer
