= Capriccio (opera) =

Opera by Richard Strauss

- Opera by Richard Strauss
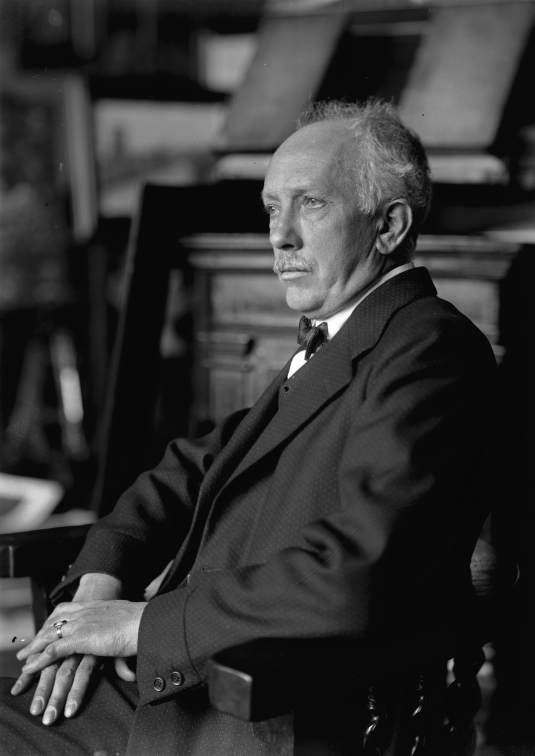
- The composer in 1922 (Photographer Schmutzer)
- Librettist: Clemens Krauss; Richard Strauss
- Language: German
- Premiere: 28 October 1942; Nationaltheater München

Capriccio, Op. 85, is the final opera by German composer Richard Strauss, subtitled "A Conversation Piece for Music". It received its premiere performance at the Nationaltheater München on 28 October 1942. Strauss and Clemens Krauss wrote the German libretto, but its genesis came from Stefan Zweig in the 1930s, and Joseph Gregor further developed the idea several years later. Strauss then took it on, but finally recruited Krauss as his collaborator. Most of the final libretto is by Krauss.

The opera originally consisted of a single act lasting close to two and a half hours. This, in combination with the work's conversational tone and emphasis on text, has prevented it from achieving great popularity. But at Hamburg in 1957, Rudolf Hartmann, who directed the opera at its premiere in Munich, inserted an interval at the point when the Countess orders chocolate, and other directors have often followed suit, including performances at Glyndebourne Festival Opera. The final scene for Countess Madeleine is often heard as an excerpt. Capriccio received its American professional premiere at The Santa Fe Opera in 1958 after the Juilliard School staged it in 1954 with Gloria Davy and Thomas Stewart as the aristocratic siblings.

== Roles ==
Role	Voice type	Premiere, 28 October 1942 (Conductor: Clemens Krauss)
The Countess	soprano	Viorica Ursuleac
Clairon, an actress	contralto	Hildegard Ranczak
Flamand, a musician	tenor	Horst Taubmann
Olivier, a poet	baritone	Hans Hotter
The Count, the Countess's brother	baritone	Walter Höfermayer
La Roche, director of a theatre	bass	Georg Hann
Monsieur Taupe	tenor	Karl Seydel
Italian singer	soprano	Irma Beilke
Italian singer	tenor	Franz Klarwein
The Major-Domo	bass	Georg Wieter
Musicians and servants

== Synopsis ==
The theme of the opera can be summarized as "Which is the greater art, poetry or music?" This was a topic of discussion at the time of the setting, as in a 1786 Salieri opera named for the issue, Prima la musica e poi le parole (First the Music and Then the Words). This question is dramatized in the story of a Countess torn between two suitors: Olivier, a poet, and Flamand, a composer.

Place: A château near Paris
Time: About 1775

At the Countess Madeleine's château, a rehearsal of Flamand's newly composed sextet is in progress. (This sextet is played in concert form as a piece of chamber music, and before the curtain rises.) Olivier and Flamand debate the relative powers of words and music. They engage in a rather furious argument which is semi-spoken rather than sung in definable arias. The theatre director La Roche wakes from a nap, and reminds them both that impresarios and actors are necessary to bring their work to life. Olivier has written a new play for the Countess's birthday the next day, which La Roche will direct, with the Count and the famous actress Clairon performing. La Roche, Olivier and Flamand proceed to a rehearsal.

The Count, the Countess's brother, teases his sister about her two suitors, Flamand and Olivier, and tells her that her love of music is due in part to the attention Flamand pays her. She in turn tells her brother that his love of words is in keeping with his attraction to the actress Clairon. The Countess admits that she cannot decide which of her suitors she prefers. Clairon arrives, and she and the Count read a scene from Olivier's play, which culminates in a love sonnet. They leave to join La Roche at the rehearsal.

Olivier tells the Countess that he means the sonnet for her. Flamand then sets the sonnet to music, while Olivier declares his love for the Countess. Flamand sings them his new composition, accompanying himself on the harpsichord. Olivier feels that Flamand has ruined his poem, while the Countess marvels at the magic synthesis of words and music. Olivier is asked to make cuts to his play and leaves for La Roche's rehearsal. Flamand declares his love for the Countess and asks her which she prefers, poetry or music. She asks him to meet her in the library the next morning at 11, when she will give him her decision. She orders chocolate in the drawing room. [At this point, some directors bring down the curtain for an interval.]

The actors and La Roche return from their rehearsal and the Count declares himself bewitched by Clairon. Madeleine tells him of her reluctance to choose between her two suitors, and the brother and sister gently tease each other again. Refreshments are served as dancers and two Italian singers entertain the guests. The Count, Countess, Flamand, Olivier, Clairon and La Roche reflect on the respective merits of dance, music and poetry. The discussion is lively, even aggressive. The Count declares, "opera is an absurd thing".

La Roche describes his planned two-part birthday entertainment for the Countess, the "Birth of Pallas Athene" followed by the "Fall of Carthage". The guests laugh and mock his extravagant ideas, but La Roche, in a monologue, attacks what he sees as the weakness of these contemporary youngsters, whose creations fail to reach the heart; he defends his faith in the theatre of the past and his own work as a mature director and a preserver of the great artistic traditions. He challenges Flamand and Olivier to create new masterworks that will reveal real people in all their complexity. The Countess manages to reconcile the three, urging them to make peace, pointing out how their arts are interdependent; she commissions the pair to collaborate on an opera. They search for a plot and it is the Count, who, according to his sister, "isn't very musical; he prefers military marches", who hits on the bold idea of an opera depicting the very events of that afternoon, the characters to be real people "like us", just as La Roche wishes.

The Count and Clairon depart for Paris with the theatre company. As they clean up the room after the guests have left, the servants comment on how absurd it would be to portray servants in an opera. "Soon everyone will be an actor", they sing. They deride their employers for 'playing' at the theatre and discuss who the Countess might be in love with. The Major-Domo discovers the prompter, Monsieur Taupe, who has fallen asleep and has been left behind. Taupe explains that it is actually he who is the most important person in the theatre, since without him, there would be no entertainment. The Major-Domo listens patiently and then arranges for food and his transport home.

As evening falls, the Countess returns, having dressed for supper, and learns from the Major-Domo that her brother has gone to Paris with Clairon, leaving her to dine alone. The Major-Domo tells her that Olivier wishes her to provide him with an ending to the opera in the library the next morning at 11. Alone, and still undecided about both the ending of the opera and her choice of lover, she sings of the inseparability of words and music. In like manner she tells herself that if she chooses one she will win him but lose the other. She consults her image in the mirror, asking "Is there any ending that isn't trivial?" The Major-Domo announces that "Dinner is served" and the Countess slowly leaves the room.
