= Fritz Schaetzler =

German opera singer

Fritz Schaetzler (13 May 1898 – 3 February 1994) was a German baritone and Kammersänger. He studied under Anna Bahr-Mildenburg. From 1919 to 1922, he was engaged at the Nationaltheater München; from 1922 to 1947, he was engaged at the Staatsoper Stuttgart. Concealing physical disabilities, including an amputated leg and a paralyzed hand, that resulted from injuries suffered during the Second Battle of Flanders, he performed throughout Europe (Prague, Bordeaux, Oslo et al.). Over the course of his career, he collaborated with prominent conductors and composers of the era (Hans Knappersbusch, Clemens Krauss, Bruno Walter, Wilhelm Furtwaengler, Richard Strauss, Hans Pfitzner, Carl Orff, Ernst Krenek et al.). Roles included Wolfram, Beckmesser, Figaro, Rigoletto, Tonio.

His autobiography, "Nun erst recht!" was published in 1943 (Deutscher Verlag, Berlin) and later adapted for the screen "Sieg des Willens" (Berlin, circa 1944/45) with Schaetzler portraying himself. Although of "non-aryan" heritage, and in spite of being an outspoken critic of the regime, Schaetzler survived the Nazi era through the personal intervention of Emmy Göring, a former theater colleague and wife of Hermann Göring, as well as through the tacit shielding of other high-ranking party members.

Schaetzler married and divorced Hildegard Ranczak, leading Strauss soprano (Clarion, Capriccio premiere, 28 October 1942, Nationaltheater München), later marrying soprano Egidia Bonessi (German-Italian Culture Exchange, La Scala, Parma et al.).

After World War II, Schaetzler served as baritone soloist for the American Forces Network (his wife succeeded Grace Moore as soprano soloist after Moore's death in 1947). Over a two and a half year period, Schaetzler and Bonessi hosted their own radio program, broadcast over AFN. With the support of Generals Dwight D. Eisenhower and George S. Patton, Schaetzler emigrated to the United States. He resided in Hollywood, California, where he was active as a vocal coach for the film industry. Students included Keith Larsen, Vera Miles, Hugh O'Brian, Ruth Roman, John Saxon, and Jay Silverheels. In the early 1950s, Schaetzler became an American citizen. He died in La Habra, California.
