= Michaela Klarwein =

German actress

Michaela Klarwein (1946 or 1943 in Munich) is a German actress.

== Life ==
Klarwein was born as daughter of the opera singer Franz Klarwein in Schwabing. She attended the Rudolf-Steiner-Schule in Munich and then a grammar school in Hamburg. Afterwards she began her studies at the acting school in Hamburg under Hildburg Frese. Half a year before her final exam she got a contract at the Hamburger theater 53 and played there in Carl Sternheim's Die Hose. From Hamburg she went for two and a half seasons to the Hessisches Staatstheater Wiesbaden. She continued her career at the Deutsches Theater Buenos Aires. With the theater she went not only as an actress, but also as an assistant director on tours in Argentina, Brazil and Chile. After her stay in South America she was engaged in Nuremberg and then went to the Theater Oberhausen in 1968. This was followed by firm and individual contracts in Hamburg, Hanover, Munich, Bern, Stuttgart, Krefeld, Bregenz, Bonn, Nuremberg, Cologne and Düsseldorf. She was part of several tour productions and took part in the summer games in Wunsiedel and Feuchtwangen. On television she had guest appearances in Lindenstraße, Der Fahnder, Die Anrheiner, 7 Tage Glück and in the feature film Engel & Joe. She also synchronizes and speaks radio commercials.

== Performances ==
- She was an opera singer under the direction of Herbert Junker in 1965 in Puccini's Madama Butterfly as Kate Linkerton.
- On 16 October 1965, she made an appearance on the Saturday night TV show Einer wird gewinnen.
- She had a part in the series Der Kommissar, episode 54 Blinde Spiele (1972).
- Among her various theatre performances is the work premiered of Aller Tage Abend at the Landestheater Linz in 1989.
- In the play Barefoot in the Park she played Ethelle Banks.
- After an appearance at the Gandersheimer Domfestspiele she received in 1997 the "Roswitha-Ring".
- 2010 she played the nun Severitas at the side of Kalle Pohl in the play Denn sie wissen nicht, was sie erbeben.
- 2014 she worked among others at the side of Andrea Spatzek, Gudrun Gabriel and Marijke Amado under the direction of Helmuth Fuschl in Kalender Girls.
- She was one of the German dubbing actors of the Japanese cartoon Summer Wars.
