= Aage Haugland =

Danish singer

Aage Haygland thinking

Aage Haugland (1 February 1944 – 23 December 2000) was a Danish operatic bass.

== Life and career ==
Haugland was born in Copenhagen on 1 February 1944. As a boy he was a soloist with the Copenhagen Boys’ Choir. He initially pursued a career in medicine; training to be a physician at the University of Copenhagen. He abandoned his medical training to study singing with Mogens Woeldike and Kristian Riis in his native city. He made his professional debut at the Norwegian National Opera in 1968 in Martinů's Comedy on the Bridge. He returned frequently to that theatre thereafter.

From 1970 to 1973, he was based in Bremen, and appeared at Den Jyske Opera in Aarhus in 1972. In 1973, he became a member of the Royal Danish Opera as the company's prima basso. In 1985 he was made a Kammersanger.

His engagements outside Denmark included roles at La Scala, Milan, The Metropolitan Opera, New York City, the Royal Opera House, Covent Garden, the Bayreuth and Salzburg Festivals, the Opéra National de Paris and the Bavarian State Opera in Munich.

In 1989, he was honoured as "Person of the Year" by the Danish-American Society of New York.

On December 23, 2000, at age 56, he died of cancer in Lillerød, Denmark.

== Roles ==
His operatic roles included Fasolt, Hunding and Hagen in Der Ring des Nibelungen, Varlaam, Pimen and Boris in Boris Godunov, King Marke in Tristan und Isolde, Klingsor in Parsifal, Prince Ivan Khovansky in Khovanshchina and the Doktor in Wozzeck. In 2000, he played the role of the Commander in the première of Poul Ruders' The Handmaid's Tale. Baron Ochs in Der Rosenkavalier was perhaps his most famous role.

== Non-operatic work ==
In 1994, Haugland premièred the role of Atlas in the musical Atlantis by Østre Gasværk. He also appeared in two Danish films, Sirup and Flamberede hjerter.

He also performed and recorded Mussorgsky's Songs and Dances of Death, and lieder by Ibert, Kilpinen, and other composers.

== Recordings ==
- Richard Wagner: The Twilight of the Gods, conductor Reginald Goodall (Chandos CHAN 3060(5))
- Modest Mussorgsky: Khovanshchina, conductor Claudio Abbado (CD: Deutsche Grammophon, Cat:429 758-2)
- Modest Mussorgsky: Mussorgsky Complete Songs (CHANDOS DIGITAL, CHAN 9336-8.) Includes the Songs and Dances of Death.
- Carl August Nielsen: Saul og David, 0p. 25 conductor Neeme Järvi (Chandos CHAN 9811/12), The Danish National Radio Symphony Orchestra, 1990
- Igor Stravinsky: The Soldier's Tale, conductor Neeme Järvi (Chandos CHAN 9189), Royal Scottish National Orchestra, 1993
- Dmitri Shostakovich: Lady Macbeth of the Mtsensk District, Bastille Orchestra, conductor Myung-Whun Chung, (Deutsche Grammophon, ASIN B000001GI1)

== Video ==
- Richard Strauss: Der Rosenkavalier, conductor Georg Solti, with Kiri te Kanawa and Barbara Bonney.
- Alban Berg: Wozzeck. Haugland plays the Doktor. Conductor Claudio Abbado, with Franz Grundheber, Hildegard Behrens and Heinz Zednik.

== Filmography ==
- Role of Klingsor in Parsifal by Hans-Jürgen Syberberg (1982).
