= Manfred Jungwirth =

Austrian opera singer (1919–1999)

- Jungwirth in 1982

Background information
- Born: June 14, 1919 (age 107); St. Pölten, Austria
- Died: October 23, 1999 (aged 80) Passau, Lower Bavaria, Germany
- Genres: Opera
- Occupation: Opera singer

Manfred Jungwirth (4 June 1919 – 23 October 1999) was an Austrian opera singer in the bass vocal range.

== Career ==
Born in St. Pölten, Jungwirth first worked as a choirboy in the Sankt Pölten Cathedral. In his hometown he was taught by Alice Goldberg, in Vienna by Emilie Auer-Weißgerber, in Bucharest by Albert d'Andrée, in Munich by Rudolf Großmann and in Berlin by Josef Burgwinkel.

An engagement of Jungwirth in the Stadttheater Klagenfurt did not come about because he had to do military service. Therefore he had his debut at the Romanian National Opera, Bucharest. Still in 1942 and then again from the end of the war until 1949 he was engaged at the Tyrolean State Theatre, where he also studied musicology and obtained his doctorate in this discipline in 1948. From 1949 to 1954 as well as 1958 to 1961 and then 1971 to 1982 he was a permanent guest at the Zurich Opera House. In between 1956/57 also in Staatstheater Wiesbaden, from 1960 to 1968 in Oper Frankfurt and 1967 to 1985 at the Wiener Staatsoper.

He mainly sang the bassbuffo parts, including operas by Domenico Cimarosa, Peter Cornelius, Friedrich von Flotow, Albert Lortzing, W. A. Mozart, Richard Strauss, Otto Nicolai, Gioacchino Rossini and Bedřich Smetana. He also took on roles like Rocco in Beethoven's Fidelio, but also some of the roles of Giuseppe Verdi, Richard Wagner and Carl Maria von Weber.

Already at the age of 30 he took over the part of Ochs von Lerchenau in Richard Strauss' der Rosenkavalier, which he first sang in Zurich in 1951/52 and then impersonated on all important stages. At the Grand Théâtre de Genève in 1974 he appeared as Osmin in Die Entführung aus dem Serail, in other Swiss theatres as van Bett in Zar und Zimmermann.

But he could also be seen in Berlin, at the Deutsche Oper am Rhein (Düsseldorf/Duisburg), Hamburg, Cologne, London, Milan, Munich, New York, Paris, Rome, San Francisco, Stuttgart and at the Bregenz Festival, Maggio Musicale Fiorentino, Glyndebourne Festival and Salzburg Festival.

Jungwirth died in Passau at age 80.

== Filmography ==
- Fidelio, with Gundula Janowitz, Lucia Popp, René Kollo, Hans Sotin, Adolf Dallapozza, director: Otto Schenk, conductor: Leonard Bernstein, Wiener Philharmoniker
- Der Rosenkavalier, with Benno Kusche, Brigitte Fassbaender, Gwyneth Jones, Lucia Popp, Anneliese Waas, David Thaw, Gudrun Wewezow, Francisco Araiza, director: Otto Schenk, conductor: Carlos Kleiber, Orchester und Chor der Bayerischen Staatsoper (Bayerische Staatsoper 1979)
