= Isabelle Sandy =

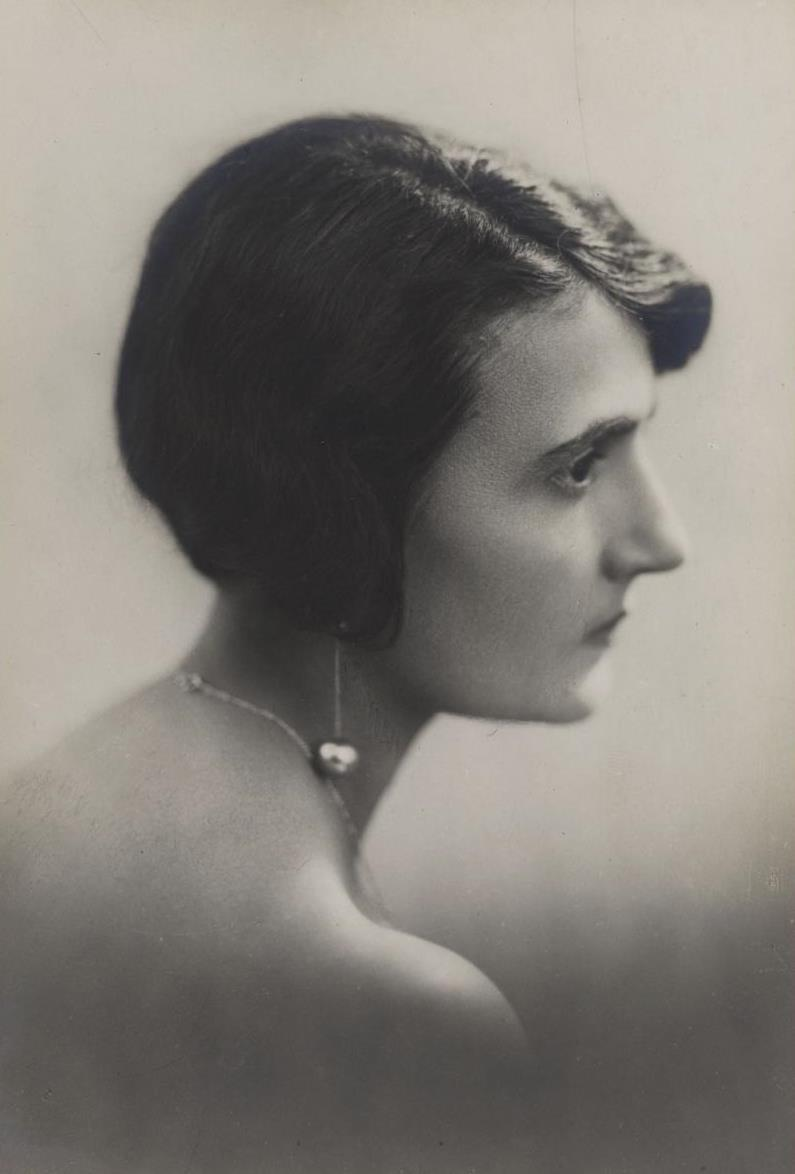
Isabelle Sandy before 1928

Isabelle Sandy (a pseudonym; 15 June 1884, Cos, Ariège – 8 May 1975) was a French poet, writer and radio presenter, best known for her regionalism. She was awarded the Prix Montyon by the Académie française for Chantal Daunoy. It has been noted that she was one of the few women writers in the interwar period.

== Bibliography ==
- L'Ève douloureuse, 1912
- Chantal Daunoy, 1917
- Maryla. Roman d'une polonaise, 1922
- Andorra ou Les hommes d’airain, 1923. American edition: Andorra: A Novel, Boston, Houghton Mifflin Company, 1924 (translated by Mathilde Monnier & Florence Donnell White; introduction by Rudyard Kipling. British edition: Andorra, London, Geoffrey Bles, 1925
- L'homme et la sauvageonne, 1925
- Llivia ou Les cœurs tragiques, 1926. American edition: Wild Heart, Boston, Houghton Mifflin Company, 1926 (translated by Charles Miner Thompson
- Les soutanes vertes, 1927
- Kaali, 1931
- La vierge au collier, 1931
- L'homme qui fabriquait de l'or, 1932
- Un homme à la mer, 1932
- La soutane sanglante, 1935
- L'enchantement, 1938
- Sang et or ou La paix par les femmes, 1945
- Printemps de feul, 1946
- Les grandiose visions d'Anne-Catherine Emmerich, 1948
- La tempête sur l'amour, 1948
- La maison des femmes seules, 1949
- Trencabel, pyrénéen, 1955
- De granit et de pourpre : le Cardinal Saliège, 1957 (with Marguerite Dufaur)
- Je n'ai jamais vu Dieu, 1959
- Montségur temple cathare : son histoire, son message, 1962
- Madonne aux cheveux blancs
