= Louise Cook (humanitarian) =

English humanitarian

Mary Louise Cook
- Born: 19 June 1901; Sunderland, England
- Died: 27 March 1991 (aged 89); London, England
- Relatives: Mary Burchell (sister)
- Honours: Righteous Among the Nations (1964); British Hero of the Holocaust (2010)

Mary Louise Cook (19 June 1901 – 27 March 1991) was an English humanitarian who, along with her sister Ida Cook (1904–1986), helped Jews escape Nazi Germany in the 1930s.

In 1965, the Cook sisters were honoured as Righteous Among the Nations by Yad Vashem in Israel. In 2010 she was recognised as a British Hero of the Holocaust with her sister.

== Early life and education ==
Cook was born on 19 June 1901 in Sunderland, County Durham, England. She was christened Mary Louise Cook after her mother. She attended The Duchess's School in Alnwick.

== Career ==
Louise and her sister, Ida Cook, worked as typists in the UK civil service.

== Personal life ==
Cook and her sister Ida resided together.

The two shared a love of opera and travelled to Austria and Germany to listen to performances. In order to hear Italian opera singer Amelita Galli-Curci perform in a full opera, Louise and Ida went without lunch and walked to work for two years, so as to be able to afford the trip from London to the Metropolitan Opera in New York City.

== Humanitarian efforts ==
During the 1930s, the Romanian singer Viorica Ursuleac and her Austrian husband Clemens Krauss, a conductor of operas, were involved in helping Jewish people involved in the opera to escape the Nazi regime. The Cook sisters befriended Krauss, and they became involved with smuggling Jewish refugees' jewellery and other valuables out of Germany and Austria, so that the refugees could meet the financial requirements needed to emigrate. The Cook sisters also housed refugees in England and lectured and advocated for Jews who needed help. By 1939, the Cook sisters had assisted over two dozen refugees in escaping from the Holocaust.

== Demise ==
Louise Cook died on 27 March 1991 in London.

== Recognition and media coverage ==
Cook was recognized as Righteous Among the Nations in 1964. She posthumously received the British Hero of the Holocaust in 2010.

Louise and Ida Cook have been the subject of several articles and books, including Ida's memoir We Followed Our Stars (reissued as Safe Passage), a 2007 essay in Granta entitled Ida and Louise, and Isabel Vincent's Overture of Hope: Two Sisters' Daring Plan that Saved Opera's Jewish Stars from the Third Reich.

== See also ==
- Jewish refugees from German-occupied Europe in the United Kingdom
