= Franz Klarwein =

German opera singer

- Born: 8 March 1914; Garmisch-Partenkirchen, Bavaria, Germany
- Died: 16 September 1991 (aged 77); Grünwald, Bavaria, Germany
- Education: Musikhochschule Frankfurt; Musikhochschule Berlin
- Occupation: Operatic tenor
- Organizations: Bavarian State Opera
- Title: Kammersänger

Franz Klarwein (8 March 1914 – 16 December 1991) was a German operatic lyric tenor and later character tenor. He was a member of the Bavarian State Opera from 1942 to 1977 and also appeared at international opera houses and festivals, especially in roles by Richard Strauss. Scheduled to sing in the 1944 world premiere of Die Liebe der Danae at the Salzburg Festival, which did not take place, he performed in both the English premiere at the Royal Opera House in London and the Swiss premiere at the Zürich Opera House. He sang in world premieres such as Capriccio in 1942, Hindemith's Die Harmonie der Welt in 1957, and Ján Cikker's Das Spiel von Liebe und Tod in 1969.

== Life ==
Klarwein was born in Garmisch-Partenkirchen. He met Richard Strauss when he was a boy, and the composer noticed his talent. Klarwein studied voice with Fritz Kertzmann, then at the Musikhochschule Frankfurt and the Musikhochschule Berlin. He made his operatic debut in 1937 at the Volksoper Berlin and remained with the company until 1942, when he became a member of the ensemble of the Bavarian State Opera. There, he appeared on 28 October 1942 in the world premiere of Capriccio by Richard Strauss, as the Italian singer. In 1944, he sang the role of the Steersman in Wagner's Der fliegende Holländer in a complete recording for the broadcaster Bayerischer Rundfunk, with Hans Hotter in the title role and Viorica Ursuleac as Senta, conducted by Hans Knappertsbusch. He sang the title role in the German premiere of Heinrich Sutermeister's opera Raskolnikoff in 1949. He was awarded the title Kammersänger in 1956. He performed in the world premiere of Hindemith's Die Harmonie der Welt on 11 August 1957. The performance, conducted by the composer, was recorded, with Kieth Engen as Rudolph II. On 1 August 1969, Klarwein performed as Timoleon in the premiere of Ján Cikker's Das Spiel von Liebe und Tod (Hra o láske a smrti).

From 1942 to 1943, Klarwein appeared at the Salzburg Festival as Elemer in Arabella, and there also sang the tenor solo in Beethoven's Ninth Symphony. Arabella was recorded, with Ursuleac in the title role, Hans Reinmar as Mandyka, and conducted by Clemens Krauss. Klarwein participated in Salzburg, in the role of Merkur, in the dress rehearsal for the world premiere of Die Liebe der Danae by Strauss, which had to be postponed. While he did not sing in the Salzburg premiere in 1952, he performed the role in 1953 at both the English premiere at the Royal Opera House in London and the Swiss premiere at the Zürich Opera House.

Klarwein's voice developed more and more into a character tenor. He performed as a guest at major European opera houses. In 1947, he appeared as Aeghist in Elektra by Strauss at the Maggio Musicale Fiorentino. The performance, with Martha Mödl as Klytämnestra, Anny Konetzni in the title role, and Hans Braun as Orest, and conducted by Dimitri Mitropoulos, was recorded. In 1951, he was Lenski in Tchaikovsky's Eugene Onegin in Zürich. In 1977, he retired from the opera stage as the Haushofmeister in Der Rosenkavalier by Strauss.

In 1949, Klarwein was the speaker and singer for the German version of the 1939 American film Gulliver's Travels, replacing voice actor Jack Mercer and singer Lanny Ross in the role of King Little (Prince Unverzagt).

Klarwein married the soprano Sári Barabás in 1956. He died in Grünwald near Munich at age 77 and was buried in the Waldfriedhof Grünwald.

== Discography ==
- Franz Klarwein. Ein Sängerporträt, Label: UraCart
- Der fliegende Holländer (complete recording of 1944), Label: Cantus-Lin
