= Georg Hann =

Austrian opera singer

Georg Hann (January 30, 1897 – December 9, 1950) was an Austrian operatic bass-baritone, particularly associated with the comic (singspiel) German repertoire.

Born in Vienna, he studied at the Music Academy there with Theodor Lierhammer. He joined the Munich State Opera in 1927, and remained with this theatre until his death. He also appeared regularly at the Vienna State Opera and the Salzburg Festival, quickly establishing himself as a leading buffo interpreter, notably in roles such as Leporello, Falstaff, Kecal, Ochs, La Roche (role he created in 1942), etc.

He made guest appearances at the Berlin State Opera, La Monnaie in Brussels, the Paris Opéra, the Royal Opera House in London, La Scala in Milan.

He did not limit himself to comic roles but also sang Sarastro, Pizzaro, Gunther, Amfortas, Daland and tackled a few Italian roles as well notably Wurm, Alfio, Tonio, as well as Mefistophele in Gounod's Faust.

Hann died in Munich aged only 53.

== Selected recordings ==
- Luisa Miller - Maria Cebotari, Hans Hopf, Helena Rott, Josef Herrmann, Georg Hann, Kurt Böhme - Dresden State Opera Chorus and Orchestra, Karl Elmendorf - Cantus Classic (1944)
- Faust - Helge Rosvaenge, Margarete Teschemacher, Georg Hann, Hans-Hermann Nissen, Carla Spletter - Stuttgart Radio Chorus and Orchestra, Joseph Keilberth - Cantus Classic (1937)

== Sources ==
- Operissimo.com
