= Georg Wieter =

German opera singer

Georg Wieter (10 March 1896 – 20 March 1988) was a German operatic and concert bass singer.

== Life ==
Born in Hannover, Wieter completed his singing studies in Hanover. In 1922 he began his stage career at the Landestheater Gotha. From 1924 to 1935 he was engaged at the Staatstheater Nürnberg where he took part in the world premiere of the opera Der Tag im Licht by Hans Grimm in 1930. In 1935 he was engaged as a permanent member of the ensemble at the Bavarian State Opera, to which he belonged until his stage farewell in 1967.

Wieter, the first to play bass and bass-buffo in the opera Der Friedenstag (1938), Capriccio (1942) by Richard Strauss as well as Der Mond (1939) by Carl Orff in Munich. Wieter was also a sought-after concert singer.

He sang and acted the role of Rocco in Walter Felsenstein's Fidelio film 1956

Wieter died in Munich at age 92.

== Awards ==
- 1964: Bavarian Order of Merit
