= Viorica Ursuleac =

Romanian soprano (1894 – 1985)

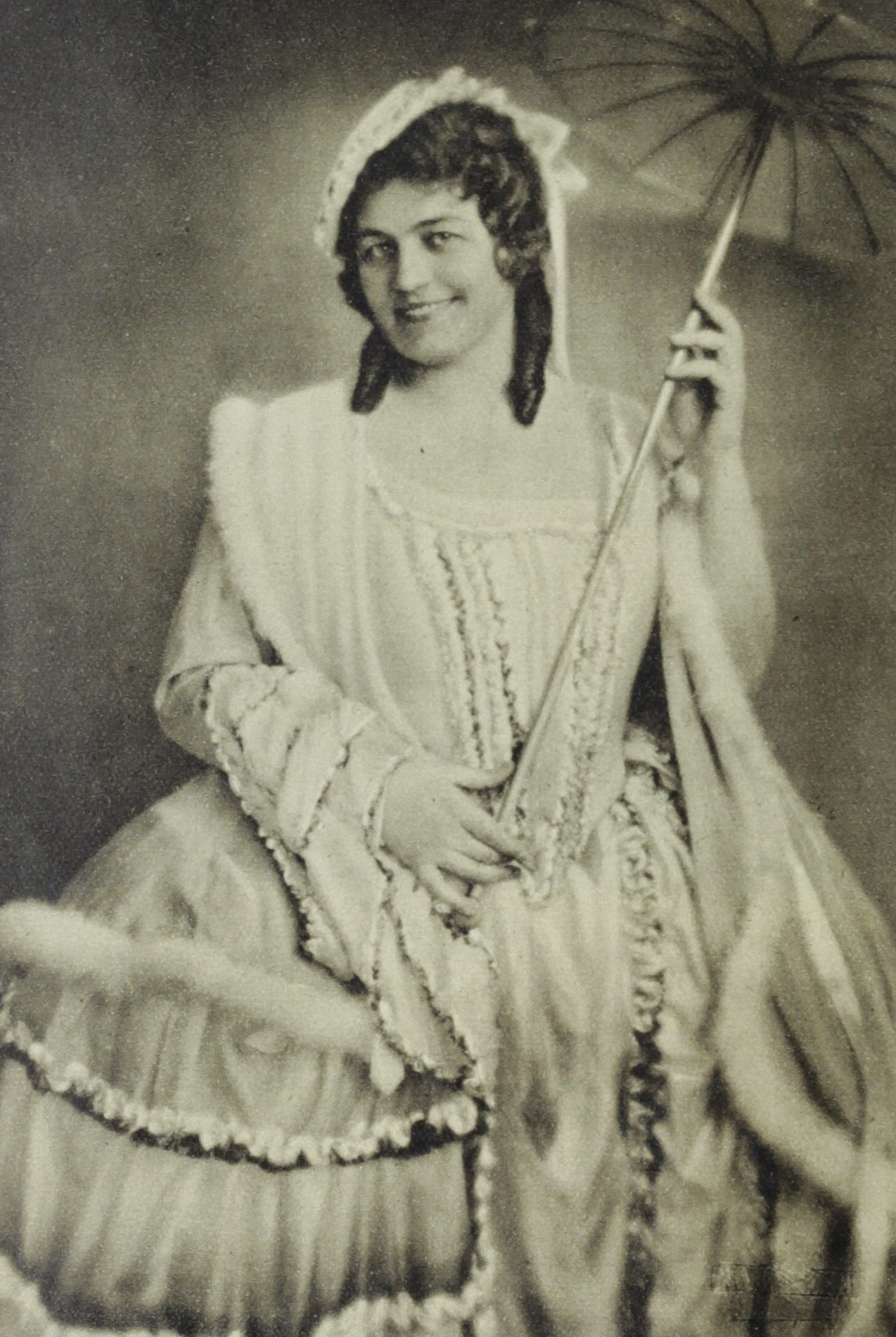
Ursuleac as Fiordiligi, Così fan tutte, Salzburg 1932

Viorica Ursuleac (26 March 1894 – 22 October 1985) was a Romanian operatic dramatic soprano.

== Life and career ==
Ursuleac was born the daughter of a Greek Orthodox archdeacon, in Chernivtsi, which is now in Ukraine, on 26 March 1894. Following training in Vienna, she made her operatic debut in Zagreb (Agram), as Charlotte in Massenet's Werther, in 1922. The soprano then appeared at the Vienna Volksoper (1924–1926), Frankfurt Opera (1926–1930), Vienna State Opera (1930–1935), Berlin State Opera (1935–1937), and Bavarian State Opera (1937–1944). She met and later married the Austrian conductor Clemens Krauss in Frankfurt during her time there. Ursuleac was Richard Strauss's favorite soprano, and he called her die treueste aller Treuen ("the most faithful of all the faithful"). She sang in the world premieres of four of his operas: Arabella (1933), Friedenstag (which was dedicated to Ursuleac and Krauss, 1938), Capriccio (1942), and the public dress-rehearsal of Die Liebe der Danae (1944).

Ursuleac appeared at the Salzburg Festival (1930–1934 and 1942–1943) and in one season at Covent Garden (1934) where she sang in the first performances in the UK of Jaromír Weinberger's Schwanda the Bagpiper and Arabella (her favorite role). She also appeared as Desdemona in Verdi's Otello at Covent Garden opposite Lauritz Melchior in the title role, with Sir Thomas Beecham conducting.

Ursuleac sang at La Scala in Strauss's Die Frau ohne Schatten (as the Empress), and Elektra (as Chrysothemis), Mozart's Così fan tutte, and Wagner's Die Walküre (as Sieglinde). Her only American appearances were at the Teatro Colón in Buenos Aires, as Brangäne in Wagner's Tristan und Isolde, opposite Kirsten Flagstad, in 1948. Also in her repertory were the Countess Almaviva (The Marriage of Figaro), Donna Elvira (Don Giovanni), Leonore (Fidelio), Senta (Der fliegende Holländer, with Hans Hotter), Amelia Grimaldi (Simon Boccanegra), Amelia (Un ballo in maschera), Leonora (La forza del destino), Élisabeth de Valois (Don Carlos), Tosca, Minnie (La fanciulla del West), Suor Angelica (opposite Luise Willer), Turandot (opposite Erna Berger's Liù), Der Rosenkavalier, Ariadne auf Naxos (first as the Composer, then as Ariadne), Die ägyptische Helena, etc.

Ursuleac was awarded the title of an Austrian Kammersängerin in 1934, a Prussian Kammersängerin in 1935. She gave her farewell in 1953 in Wiesbaden in Der Rosenkavalier. She was appointed professor at the Salzburg Mozarteum in 1964. The soprano recorded for Deutsche Grammophon in 1933, 1936, and 1943, with excerpts from Arabella, Le nozze di Figaro, Tosca, Turandot, Der Rosenkavalier, Il trovatore, and Capriccio, as well as two Lieder of Strauss. She was included in Volume III of EMI's The Record of Singing, in an excerpt from Arabella (1933).

Ursuleac's voice was not of great beauty, at least as recorded, but she was considered to be an accomplished musician and actress. In the words of one colleague, the soprano Hildegard Ranczak, "Although she had a lovely, facile top, I was constantly amazed at the two hours' vocalizing she went through before each performance. Hers was, in my opinion, a marvelously constructed, not really natural voice which she used with uncanny intelligence".

During the 1930s, Ursuleac and her husband were involved in helping Jews escape from Germany. After befriending British opera fans, the novelist Ida Cook and her sister Louise Cook, they instigated their rescue operation which began after Ursuleac asked the Cooks to assist a Jewish friend leave Germany. Krauss gave cover to their smuggling operation by arranging Munich Opera performances around the times and cities that the Cooks needed to make contact with escapees. At least 29 Jewish families were saved by this operation.

Ursuleac died on 22 October 1985 at the age of 91 in the village of Ehrwald in Tyrol where she had resided since before the death of her husband, Clemens Krauss, in 1954.

Ursuleac is interviewed on the 1984 documentary, Richard Strauss Remembered, narrated by Sir John Gielgud.

== Selected discography ==
- Strauss: Ariadne auf Naxos [without Prologue] (Berger, Rosvaenge; Krauss, 1935) [live]
- Strauss: Friedenstag (Hotter; Krauss, 1939) [live]
- Strauss: Arabella (Krauss, 1942) [live]
- Strauss: Capriccio: excerpts (Schock, Braun, Schmitt-Walter, Töpper; Krauss, 1942) [live]
- Wagner: Der fliegende Holländer (Hotter; Krauss, 1944) [live]
- Strauss: Der Rosenkavalier (Kern, Milinkovič, Weber; Krauss, 1944) [live]
- Wagner: Tristan und Isolde [as Brangäne] (Flagstad, Svanholm, Hotter; Erich Kleiber, 1948) [live]
- Strauss: Lieder (Krauss, 1952)

== Bibliography ==
- Safe Passage, by Ida Cook, Harlequin, 1950/76/08. ISBN 978-0-373-89201-3
- Richard Strauss und seine Sänger, by Signe von Scanzoni, Munich, 1961.
- The Last Prima Donnas, by Lanfranco Rasponi, Alfred A. Knopf, 1982. ISBN 0-394-52153-6
- "Viorica Ursuleac", by Ulrich Dahmen; "The Recordings of Viorica Ursuleac," by Richard Copeman, The Record Collector, November/December 1990.
