= Heinrich Vogl =

German opera singer

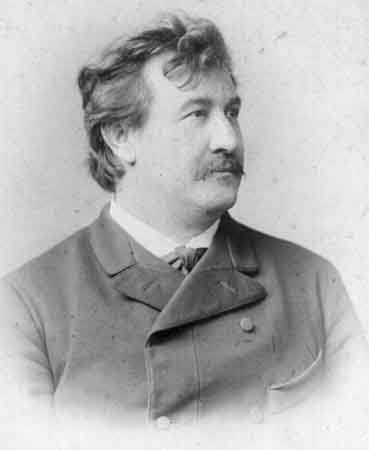
- Born: 15 January 1845
- Died: 21 April 1900 (aged 55)
- Occupation: operatic heldentenor
- Years active: 1869–1890
- Spouse: Therese Vogl

Heinrich Vogl (15 January 1845 – 21 April 1900) was a German operatic heldentenor.

He played the role of Loge in Richard Wagner's Das Rheingold at Munich Court Opera on 22 September 1869, with his wife, Therese Vogl, playing the role of Wellgunde. He also played the role of Siegmund in Wagner's Die Walküre, also at Munich, on 26 June 1870. Therese Vogl played the role of Siegmund's sister and lover Sieglinde in the same performance. His Munich debut was as Max in Weber's Der Freischütz. He sang at Bayreuth, Berlin, London and the Metropolitan Opera in New York City. At Bayreuth, he played the role of Loge in the first complete Ring cycle on 13 August 1876.

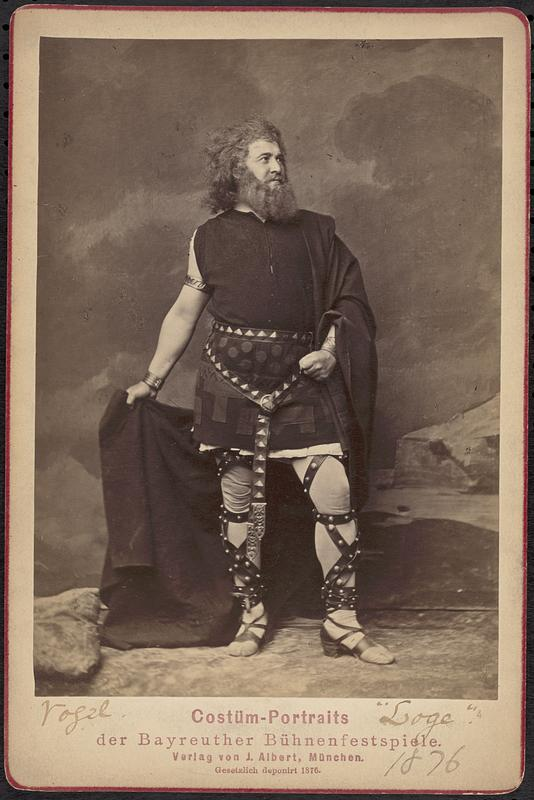
Heinrich Vogl played Loge in the August 1876 Bayreuth performance of "Das Rheingold.", 1876, Cabinet Card Collection, Boston Public Library

His performance in the role caused fellow singer Lilli Lehmann to comment that he was born for the part and that his Loge had never been equalled. His debut at the Metropolitan Opera was in the title role of Lohengrin on 1 January 1890; he also sang Loge, Siegmund, the title role of Tannhäuser, Tristan in Tristan und Isolde, and Siegfried in both Siegfried and Götterdämmerung at the Met. Heinrich Vogl was also the first performer to play the roles of Loge and Siegfried in London, which he did in the first Ring cycle in London at Her Majesty's Theatre, with Anton Seidl conducting and his wife playing the role of Brünnhilde.

His Wagner repertoire included all the leading tenor roles except Walther in Die Meistersinger von Nürnberg, for which Wagner rejected him for the 1868 premiere on the grounds that, at the age of 23, Vogl was "totally incompetent". He and his wife Therese were among the first performers to sing the lead roles in Tristan und Isolde, and were highly regarded in these roles. His non-Wagner roles included the title role in Verdi's Otello, Canio in Leoncavallo's Pagliacci, Aeneas in Berlioz's Les Troyens and the title role of Berlioz's Benvenuto Cellini. He was known for his vocal power and stamina, which allowed him to perform Loge, Siegmund and both Siegfrieds from Wagner's Ring cycle on consecutive evenings multiple times.

Heinrich Vogl is buried beside his wife in Tutzing, Bavaria.
