= Hermann von Gilm =

Austrian lawyer and poet (1812–1864)

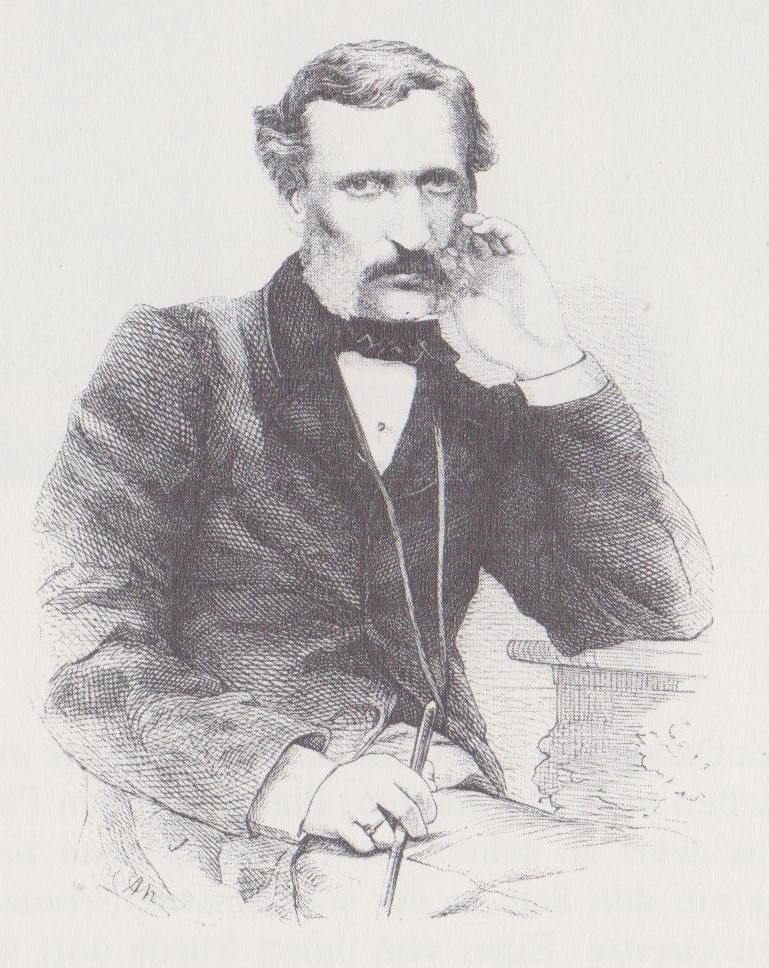
Hermann von Gilm zu Rosenegg

Hermann von Gilm, officially Hermann Gilm von Rosenegg (1 November 1812 – 31 May 1864) was an Austrian lawyer and poet.

Born in Innsbruck, he studied law there. He worked from 1840 as a public official in Schwaz, Bruneck and Rovereto. From 1846 he worked in Vienna.

Richard Strauss set several of his Sophienlieder to music. Von Gilm died in Linz.

== Selected publications ==
- Märzveilchen (1836)
- Sommerfrischlieder aus Natters (1839)
- Sophienlieder (1844)
- Tiroler Schützen-Leben. Festgabe zur Feier der fünfhundertjährigen Vereinigung Tirols mit dem österreichischen Herrscherhause. Wagner, Innsbruck 1863. – Volltext online.
- Gedichte. Zwei Bände. Gerold, Wien 1864-65.
  - Band 1. – Volltext online.
  - Band 2. – Volltext online.
- Nachtrag (1868)
- Jakob Stainer. Dichtung. In: Jakob Stainer, der Geigenmacher von Absam in Geschichte und Dichtung. Wagner, Innsbruck 1992, S. 137–143. — Volltext online.
- Gedichte. Liebeskind, Leipzig 1894. – Volltext online.

== Literature ==
- Johann Georg Obrist: Der Dichter Hermann von Gilm: Eine Biographie, 1874
- Arnold von der Passer: Hermann vom Gilm – sein Leben und seine Dichtungen. Liebeskind, Leipzig 1889, OBV.
- Anton Schlossar (1904). "Gilm, Hermann von" . Allgemeine Deutsche Biographie (in German). Vol. 49. Leipzig: Duncker & Humblot. pp. 359–364.
- Hermann von Gilm, Moritz Necker (Hrsg.): Hermann von Gilms Familien- und Freundesbriefe. Schriften des Literarischen Vereins in Wien, Band 17, ZDB-ID 513493-6. Literarischer Verein, Wien 1912, OBV.
- Walther Neuwirth: Herrmann von Gilm. Dissertation. Universität Wien, Wien 1920, OBV.
- Anton Dörrer: Hermann von Gilm und die Jesuiten – ein altes Tiroler Kampfkapitel, nach unbeachteten Briefen und Gedichten. Innsbruck (ca.) 1924, OBV.
- Anton Dörrer, Hermann von Gilm: Hermann von Gilms Weg und Weisen. Tyrolia, Innsbruck 1924, OBV.
- "Gilm zu Rosenegg Hermann von". In: Österreichisches Biographisches Lexikon 1815–1950 (ÖBL). Vol. 1, Austrian Academy of Sciences, Vienna 1957, p. 441.
- Hermann von Gilm, Alois Großschopf (Hrsg.): Aus bergkristallener Schale. Stiasny-Bücherei, Band 24, ZDB-ID 1067853-0. Stiasny, Graz (u.a.) 1958, OBV.
- Alois Großschopf (1964). "Gilm zu Rosenegg, Hermann v.". Neue Deutsche Biographie (in German). Vol. 6. Berlin: Duncker & Humblot. pp. 400–401. (full text online).
