= Clemens Krauss =

Austrian conductor and opera impresario (1893 - 1954)

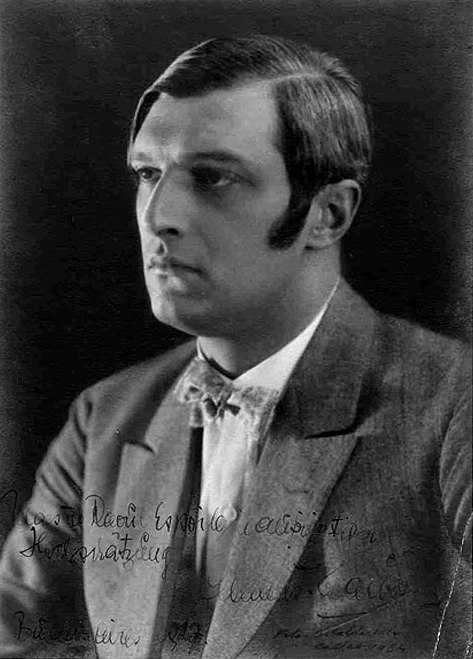
Clemens Krauss, 1915

Clemens Heinrich Krauss (31 March 1893 – 16 May 1954) was an Austrian conductor and opera impresario, particularly associated with the music of Richard Strauss, Johann Strauss and Richard Wagner. He founded the New Year's Concert of the Vienna Philharmonic and conducted it until 1954.

== Family and early life ==
Krauss was born in Vienna to Clementine Krauss, then a 15-year-old dancer in the Vienna Imperial Opera Ballet, later a leading actress and operetta singer, niece of the prominent nineteenth-century operatic soprano Gabrielle Krauss. His natural father, Chevalier Hector Hector Baltazzi (1851-1916), came from a family of wealthy Phanariot bankers resident in Vienna. Baltazzi's older sister Helene was married to Baron Albin von Vetsera and was the mother of Baroness Mary Vetsera, who was accordingly Clemens Krauss' first cousin.

Krauss sang in the Hofkapelle (Imperial Choir) as a Vienna Choir Boy because of his ″extraordinarily beautiful soprano voice". He graduated from the Vienna Conservatory in 1912, after studying composition with Hermann Graedener and theory with Richard Heuberger there. He was then appointed chorus master in the Brünn Theatre, Moravia, (1912-1913), where he made his conducting debut in 1913.

He was first married to soprano Margarethe Abraham (1889–1963). They had two sons, Octavian and Oliver. The Romanian soprano Viorica Ursuleac, who often sang under him, became his second wife in August 1945.

== Career ==
Krauss made the rounds of regional centers, conducting in Riga (1913–1914), Nuremberg (1915) and Stettin (1916–1921) in Pomerania, Germany. The latter appointment gave him ample opportunity to travel to Berlin to hear Arthur Nikisch conduct the Berlin Philharmonic, a major influence. He then returned to Austria as director of the opera and symphony concerts in Graz. In 1922, he was invited by Richard Strauss to join the conducting staff of the Vienna State Opera and teacher of the conducting class in the Vienna Singakademie. He conducted the Vienna Tonkünstler concerts from 1923 to 1927, and was Intendant of the opera in Frankfurt and director of the Museum concerts there from 1924 to 1929.

In 1926, Krauss made his debut at the Salzburg Festival. In 1929, he visited the United States where he guest-conducted the Philadelphia Orchestra and New York Philharmonic. Also in 1929, he was appointed director of the Vienna State Opera, conducting several operas by Richard Strauss and other contemporaries, among them Alban Berg's avant-garde atonal opera Wozzeck and Jaromir Weinberger's Schwanda the Bagpiper, both performed for the first time in Vienna in 1930. The orchestra of the Vienna State Opera, whose members formed an independent concert entity known as the Vienna Philharmonic, appointed him its music director in 1930. Krauss also conducted regularly at the Salzburg Festival from 1929 to 1934. In Vienna and Salzburg, his closest collaborator was stage director Lothar Wallerstein. In 1933, he took over the world premiere of Richard Strauss's opera Arabella in Dresden after the departure of conductor Fritz Busch to England.

In 1933-34, Krauss had to give up his positions in Vienna. His commitment to contemporary music had caused financial losses at the Philharmoniker's subscription concerts therefore the orchestra abolished the position of a permanent conductor. Since 1933, the orchestra itself programmed its concerts. At the State Opera he became the victim of several intrigues, so that the minister offered a new contract just for one year. The Nazis invited Krauss to direct the Berlin State Opera in 1935 after Erich Kleiber had resigned in protest against National Socialist government policies. Although Krauss was never a member of the Nazi party, he had several meetings with high ranking representatives of the regime, including Hitler and Göring. Throughout the 1930s, Krauss and his wife, soprano Viorica Ursuleac were involved in helping Jews escape from Germany. After befriending British novelist Ida Cook and her sister Louise Cook, both opera fans, he instigated their rescue operation which began after his wife asked the Cooks to assist a Jewish friend in leaving Germany. Krauss gave cover to their smuggling operation by arranging performances by the Munich Opera around the times and cities that the Cooks needed to make contact with escapees. At least 29 Jews were saved by this operation.

Krauss was appointed Intendant of the National Theatre Munich following the resignation of Hans Knappertsbusch in 1937. Krauss had become a close friend of Richard Strauss, and even wrote the libretto for his opera Capriccio which he premiered in Munich in 1942. He also conducted the premieres of Strauss's operas Friedenstag (1938 in Munich) and Die Liebe der Danae (1944/1952 in Salzburg). During the early 1940s, he taught at the Mozarteum University of Salzburg where among his pupils was composer Roman Toi.

After the Munich opera house had been destroyed by Allied bombing, Krauss returned to conduct the Vienna Philharmonic in 1944-45 until it ceased activities shortly before the end of World War II. After the war, Allied officials investigated his career and forbade him from appearing in public until 1947. Krauss then resumed conducting many of the Vienna Philharmonic's concerts, including its famous annual New Year's Day pops concerts featuring Johann and Josef Strauss waltzes, overtures and polkas, many of which were recorded for Decca along with other studio recordings of mostly Johann, Josef and Richard Strauss.

In 1951, Krauss returned to Covent Garden in London where he had directed the first British performances of Arabella in 1934. In 1953, he was for the first time invited to the Bayreuth Festival, conducting an impressive Wagner Ring cycle now available on CD, starring Astrid Varnay as Brünnhilde. He also recorded a highly regarded Parsifal at Bayreuth, starring Martha Mödl as Kundry, in 1953, at the height of Mödl's brief prime.

Krauss died in 1954 in Mexico City, after a concert with the National Symphony Orchestra of Mexico. He is buried in Ehrwald, Austria alongside his wife, Viorica Ursuleac, who died in 1985.

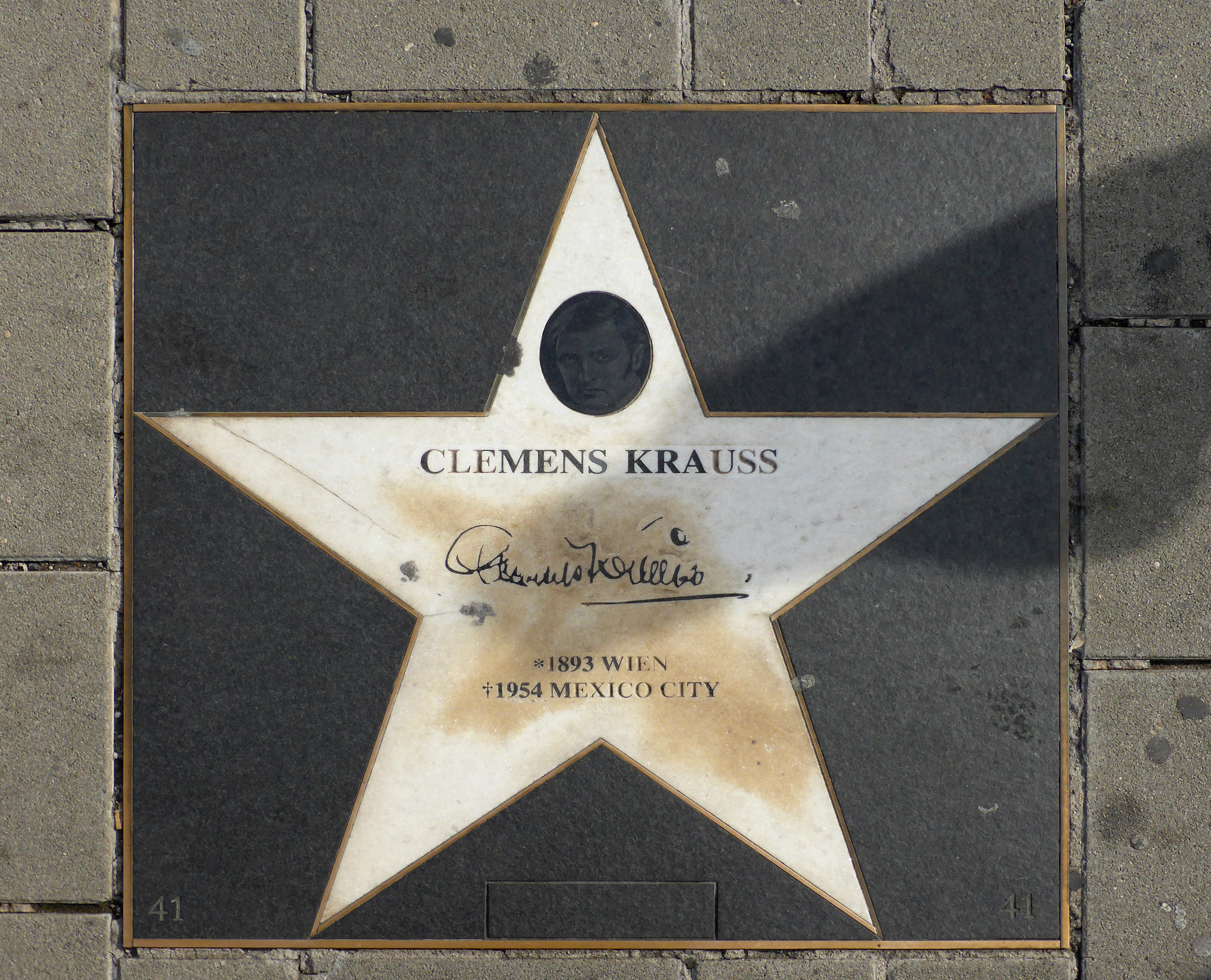
Walk of Fame Vienna

Krauss made relatively few recordings; they include his 1950 Decca recording of Johann Strauss II's Die Fledermaus, with the Vienna Philharmonic and State Opera star soloists (not including any of the dialogue; only the second complete recording after a pre–World War I acoustical 78 set made in Berlin). His 1953 live performance of Richard Wagner's Ring Cycle from Bayreuth has been released on disc. A recording with the Vienna Symphony of Beethoven's Choral Fantasy, reissued on several budget labels after its original release by Vox, is also one of the few recordings featuring pianist Friedrich Wührer. All three have been reissued on compact disc.

Krauss' relationship with English sisters Ida and Louise Cook and his support to them for saving German Jews of the Holocaust during the Third Reich is the subject of the novel "El último concierto de Viena" (2025), "Last concert in Vienna" of the Spanish writer Martín Llade, published by Ediciones B, Penguin Random House.

== Bibliography ==
- Maschat, Erik (1971). “Clemens Krauss,” trans. Peter Hutchison, Recorded Sound, No. 42-43, 740-746
- Joseph Gregor, Clemens Krauss: Seine Musikalische Sendung (Munich, 1953)
- G. K. Kende and Signe Scanzoni, Der Prinzipal: Clemens Krauss-Fakten, Vergleiche, Rückschlüsse (Berlin, 1988) ISBN 3-7952-0549-2

Cultural offices
Preceded by Erich Kleiber	Music Director, Staatsoper Unter den Linden; 1935-1936	Succeeded by Herbert von Karajan
