= Markus Schirmer =

Austrian pianist (born 1963)

Markus Schirmer

Markus Schirmer (born 10 June 1963) is an Austrian pianist.

Schirmer is a professor at the University of Music and Performing Arts, Graz, where he teaches concert piano. He was awarded the Music Manual Award at the international Music Convention EUROMUSIC and the Karl-Böhm-Interpretationspreis, an award for Austrian artists.

== Discography ==
- Pictures & Reflections (Maurice Ravel: Miroirs, Modest Mussorgsky: Pictures at an Exhibition) Tacet 2005, T 132
- Ludwig van Beethoven: Early Piano Sonatas, Op. 13 Pathétique; Op. 2, No. 2 and Op. 2, No. 3; Tacet 2003, T 128
- W. A. Mozart: The Piano Quartets, Tacet 2002
- Franz Schubert: Piano sonatas D 625 F minor, D 845 A minor, Lotus Records
- Joseph Haydn: Piano Sonatas Vol. 1, Lotus Records
- Markus Schirmer and Wolfram Berger – Engel im Kopf
- Scurdia – Risgar Koshnaw: My songs from Kurdistan
- Ludwig van Beethoven: Piano Sonatas: Nos. 13, 14 (Moonlight), 19, 20. Piano Sonatinas: in G, in F. Variations on a Swiss Song, Tacet 2011, T194
- W. A. Mozart: The Mozart Sessions: Concerto No. 12, K. 414, Concerto No. 13, K. 415, Church Sonata, K. 336; Paladino 2012
