= Sonatina =

Musical form, miniature of sonata

A sonatina (French: “sonatine”, German: “Sonatine") is a small sonata. As a musical term, sonatina has no single strict definition; it is rather a title applied by the composer to a piece that is in basic sonata form, but is shorter and lighter in character, or technically more elementary, than a typical sonata. The term has been in use at least since the late baroque; there is a one-page, one-movement harpsichord piece by Handel called "Sonatina". It is most often applied to solo keyboard works, but a number of composers have written sonatinas for violin and piano (see list under violin sonata), for example the Sonatina in G major for Violin and Piano by Antonín Dvořák, and occasionally for other instruments, for example the Clarinet Sonatina by Malcolm Arnold.

== Term ==
Clementi: Sonatina in C major, Op. 36, No. 1
I. Allegro

II. Andante

III. Vivace

The title "Sonatina" was used occasionally by J. S. Bach for short orchestral introductions to large vocal works, as in his cantata Gottes Zeit ist die allerbeste Zeit, BWV 106, a practice with precedent in the work of the earlier German composer Nicolaus Bruhns. This is the only sense in which Bach used the term sonatina, although he composed many chamber and solo sonatas for various instruments.

As with many musical terms, sonatina is used inconsistently. The most common meaning is a short, easy sonata suitable for students, such as the piano sonatinas of Clementi. However, by no means are all sonatinas technically undemanding, for example the virtuoso sonatinas of Busoni and Alkan, and the Sonatine of Ravel, whose title reflects its neo-classical quality. On the other hand, some sonatas could equally have been called sonatinas: for example Beethoven's Op. 49, titled by the composer "Zwei Leichte Sonaten für das Pianoforte" ("Two Easy Sonatas for Piano") comprise only two short movements each, a sonata-allegro and a short rondo (No. 1) or minuet (No. 2), all well within the grasp of the intermediate student. However, other works titled "Sonatina", such as the Sonatinas in G and in F major, have been attributed to Beethoven.

== Form ==
In general, a sonatina will have one or more of the following characteristics: brevity; fewer movements than the four of the late classical sonata; technical simplicity; a lighter, less serious character; and (in post-romantic music) a neo-classical style or a reference to earlier music. Muzio Clementi's sonatinas op. 36 are very popular among students.

The first (or only) movement is generally in an abbreviated sonata form, with little or no development of the themes. For this reason, a sonatina is sometimes defined, especially in British usage, as a short piece in sonata form in which the development section is quite perfunctory or entirely absent: the exposition is followed either immediately by a brief bridge passage to modulate back to the home key for the recapitulation or the start of recapitulation itself without a bridge. Subsequent movements (at most two) may be in any of the common forms, such as a minuet or scherzo, a slow theme-and-variations, or a rondo.

== Composers ==
=== For solo piano ===
- Alexander Borodin
- Alexander Goedicke
- Alexandre Tansman
- Anton Diabelli
- Aram Khachaturian (1959)
- Béla Bartók – Sonatina (1915)
- Ludwig van Beethoven – Sonatina in G major (Anh.5 No.1, attributed)
- Ludwig van Beethoven – Sonatina in F major (Anh.5 No.2, attributed)
- Camargo Guarnieri
- Charles-Valentin Alkan – Sonatina in A minor, Op.61 (1861)
- Carl Czerny
- Carl Philipp Emanuel Bach
- Charles Koechlin
- Erik Satie
- Ferruccio Busoni
- Francisco Mignone
- Francisco Pulgar Vidal
- Frank Lynes
- Franz Joseph Haydn
- Friedrich Kuhlau
- Fritz Spindler
- Geghuni Chitchian — Sonatina (1987)
- Georg Benda
- George Frideric Handel
- Heinrich Lichner
- Ignaz Pleyel
- Jan Ladislav Dussek
- Jean Sibelius
- John Ireland – Sonatina (1926–27)
- Lars-Erik Larsson — Sonatina No. 1, Op. 16 (1938)
- Lars-Erik Larsson — Sonatina No. 2
- Lars-Erik Larsson — Sonatina No. 3, Op. 41 (1950)
- Maurice Ravel- Sonatine (Ravel)(1905)
- Mikis Theodorakis – Sonatina
- Muzio Clementi
- Osvaldo Lacerda
- Stephen Heller
- Swan Hennessy (Op. 43, 1911)
- Tigran Mansurian — Sonatina No. 1 (1963)
- Tigran Mansurian — Sonatina No. 2 (1987)
- Wolfgang Amadeus Mozart – "Six Viennese Sonatinas" (1805)
- York Bowen Piano sonatina op.144

=== For instrumental duos ===
- Antonín Dvořák – Sonatina for violin and piano (1893)
- Zdeněk Fibich - Violin Sonatina, Op. 27
- Bohuslav Martinů – Sonatina for clarinet and piano (1956)
- Walter Piston – Sonatina for violin and harpsichord (1945)
- Mikis Theodorakis – 2 Sonatinas for violin and piano

=== Other sonatinas ===
- Pyotr Ilyich Tchaikovsky Serenade for Strings, 1st movement "Pezzo in forma di sonatina" (1880)
