= Piano Sonata No. 19 =

Piano Sonata No. 19 may refer to:

- Piano Sonata No. 19 (Beethoven)
- Piano Sonata No. 19 (Mozart)
- Piano Sonata No. 19 (Schubert)
