= Piano Sonata No. 20 =

Piano Sonata No. 20 may refer to:

- Piano Sonata No. 20 (Beethoven)
- Piano Sonata in B-flat major, K. 498a, formerly considered Piano Sonata No. 20 by Mozart
- Piano Sonata No. 20 (Schubert)
