= Erik Werba =

Austrian composer and pianist

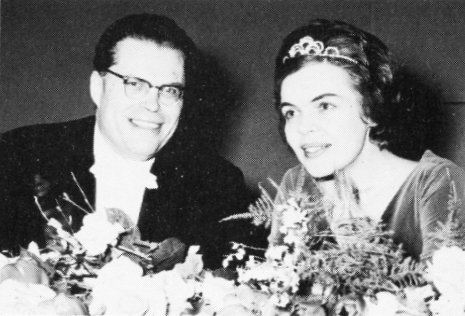
- Erik Werba (left) with Raili Kostia in Helsinki, 1960
- Born: 23 May 1918; Baden bei Wien, Austro-Hungarian Empire
- Died: 9 April 1992 (aged 73); Hinterbrühl, Austria
- Education: Akademie für Musik und darstellende Kunst; University of Vienna
- Occupations: Classical pianist; Academic teacher; Conductor; Composer; Writer; Music critic
- Organizations: Mozartgemeinde; Wiener Musikakademie; Akademie für Musik und darstellende Kunst, Graz

Erik Werba (23 May 1918 – 9 April 1992) was an Austrian classical pianist who is especially known as an accompanist of singers. He was also a music critic, conductor, composer, author and academic teacher.

== Career ==
Werba was born in Baden bei Wien, the son of Ludwig Werba (1884–1945), who was born in Graz and became a composer, music director and vice-president of the Österreichisch-ungarischer Musikerverband, founded in 1896. Ludwig Werba died in a bombing raid on 2 April 1945.

Werba completed the Matura at the Baden Gymnasium in 1936. He then studied at both the Akademie für Musik und darstellende Kunst in Vienna and the University of Vienna, where he earned a PhD in 1940. He worked as a music critic and teacher, and directed the Mozartgemeinde after World War II. Werba was Kapellmeister at the Stadttheater Baden from 1945 to 1946. As a pianist, he focused on accompanying lieder singers. He collaborated with Irmgard Seefried, Christa Ludwig, Walter Berry, Kim Borg, Brigitte Fassbaender, Peter Schreier and Nicolai Gedda, appearing internationally.

Werba was a professor of lied and oratorio at the Wiener Musikakademie from 1949 to 1990, and from 1964 to 1971 also at the Akademie für Musik und darstellende Kunst in Graz. As a book author, he received a lukewarm, if not cold reception; thus his 1971 monograph of the composer Hugo Wolf was charged for "a remarkable lack of insight into the actual problems of Hugo Wolf′s work and its reception history". He was more successful as a journalist, working for the newsletters of the Mozartgemeinde, the Wiener Figaro, the Österreichische Musikzeitschrift and the periodical Musikerziehung. As a composer, he wrote incidental music, chamber music and lieder, often performed during his lifetime.

Werba died on 9 April 1992 in Hinterbrühl. He is buried at the Maria Enzersdorf cemetery.

== Compositions ==
Werba composed lieder, including:

- "Ich bin...", for high voice and piano (1936)
- "Neige dein Köpfchen", for high voice and piano (1936)
- "Ich saß vor dunklem Walde", for high voice and piano (1936)

== Publications ==
- Richard Strauss zum 85. Geburtstag, 1949
- Tenoralbum, 1951
- Bariton-Baß-Album, 1953
- Josef Marx, eine Studie, 1962
- Hugo Wolf oder – Der zornige Romantiker, 1971
- Erich Marckhl, 1972
- Hugo Wolf und seine Lieder, 1984

== Awards ==
- 1960: Mozartmedaille awarded by the Mozart Society of Vienna
