= Andreas Großbauer =

Andreas Großbauer (born 1974) is an Austrian classical violinist. From September 2014 to September 2017 he was chairman of the Vienna Philharmonic.

== Life ==
Born in Graz, Großbauer received his first violin lessons at the age of five. At the age of twelve he was admitted to the University of Music and Performing Arts Graz. He then studied with the Vienna Philharmonic Alfred Staar in Oberschützen and Vienna.

In May 2001, after winning an audition, he became first violinist with the Wiener Symphoniker. Furthermore he became a member of the Philharmonia Schrammeln Vienna; he belonged to this ensemble for ten years. In September 2005 he was accepted into the orchestra of the Vienna State Opera. Since 2008 he has been a member of the Vienna Philharmonic Association.

In the summer of 2007 he was elected by the plenum of the Vienna Philharmonic Orchestra to the position of Ballchef, since then he has organised the annual Philharmoniker Ball in the Vienna Musikverein. On 11 June 2014 Großbauer was elected as the new president of the Vienna Philharmonic Orchestra by the orchestra's assembly. On 1 September 2014 he succeeded Clemens Hellsberg in this function. On 1 September 2017, Großbauer was replaced by Daniel Froschauer as Chairman of the Vienna Philharmonic Orchestra.

His wife Maria Großbauer is the successor of Desirée Treichl-Stürgkh, organizer of the Vienna Opera Ball and since November 2017 Member of the National Council.
