= Erich Marckhl =

Austrian musicologist and composer

Erich Marckhl (3 February 1902 in Celje – 8 July 1980 in Graz) was an Austrian musicologist and composer.

== Life ==
Erich Marckhl received his doctorate from the University of Vienna in 1925 . From 1926 to 1936 he worked as an educator at the Bundes-Erziehungsanstalt Wien XIII, formerly a cadet school, but was dismissed for political reasons (membership in the illegal NSDAP ). He then taught from 1937 to 1939 at the teacher training college in Dortmund . In 1939 he became "Specialist Inspector for Music at Higher Schools" in Vienna. In 1940–45 professor for music education at the Vienna State Academy of Music (today University of Music and Performing Arts Vienna ). At the music academies in Vienna he held a seminar for music education and a provisional teacher examination board.

Due to his National Socialist past, he initially remained unemployed in 1945 and lived with the support of the Gottfried von Einem family in Ramsau am Dachstein (1945/46) and in Plomberg am Mondsee (1946–48). In 1948 he became director, 1949-52 director of the Municipal Music School in Kapfenberg. In 1948, Marckhl was given the newly established small seminar for music education at the Johann Joseph Fux Conservatory in Graz . In 1963, Marckhl, became the President of University of Music and Performing Arts Graz in addition to that of being a professor. In 1965, Marckhl founded a cultural and university center in Oberschützen in Burgenland.

== Awards ==
- Great Austrian State Prize for Music (1968)
- Mozart Medal (Mozartgemeinde) by the Mozart Society Vienna (1971)
- Joseph Marx Music Prize from the State of Styria (1972)
