= K54 =

K54 or K-54 may refer to:

- K-54 (Kansas highway), a state highway in Kansas
- K-54 (pistol)
- Piano Sonata in F major, K. 547a, by Wolfgang Amadeus Mozart
- Potassium-54, an isotope of potassium
- Teller Airport, in Alaska
