= University of Music and Performing Arts Graz =

Public university in Graz, Austria

Coordinates: 47°04′21″N 15°27′01″E

University of Music and Performing Arts Graz / Kunstuniversität Graz (KUG)
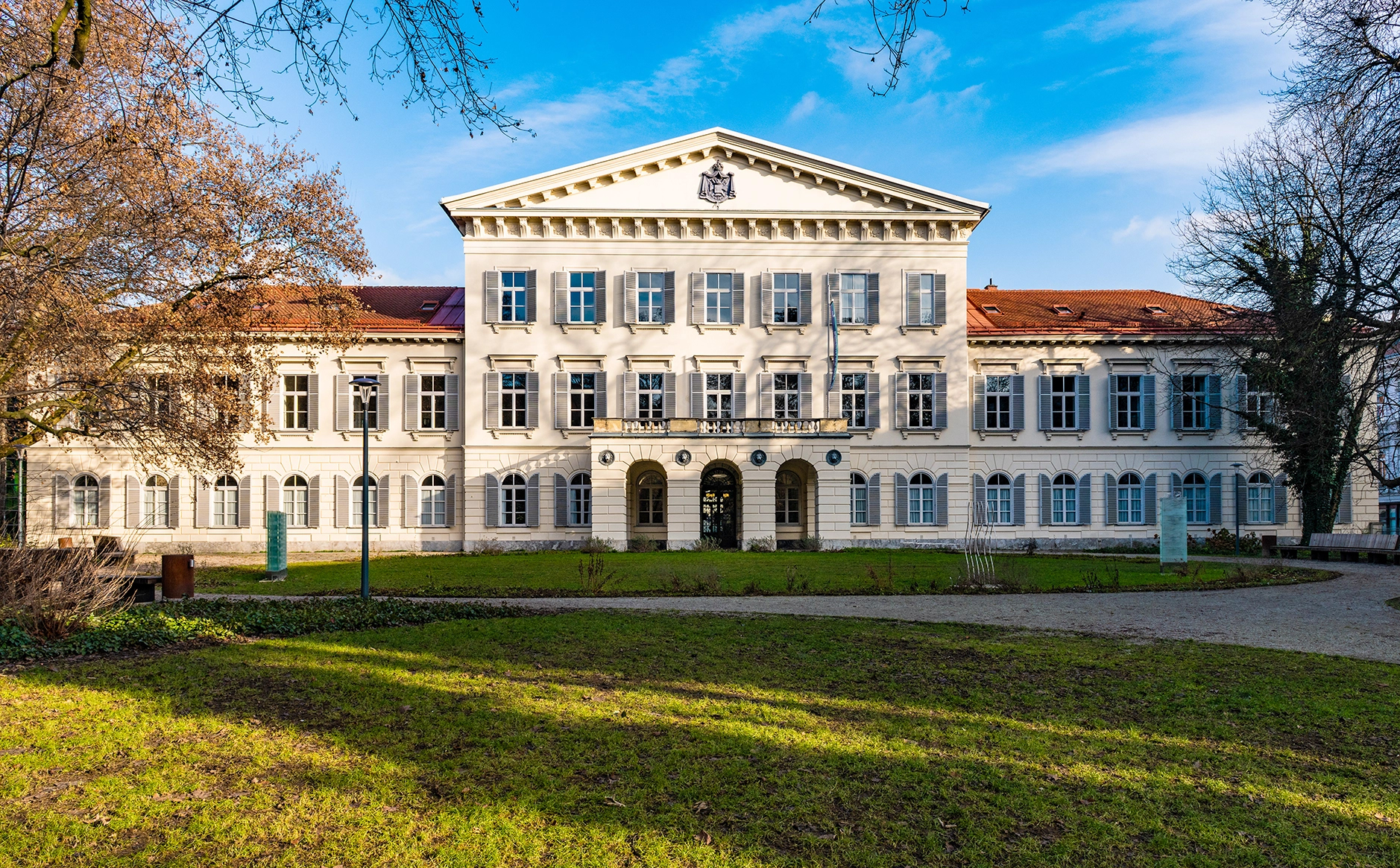
- Established: 1963 (predecessor 1816)
- Head: Georg Schulz
- Academic staff: Professors 117 / 105.1
- Students: 2199 (incl. "official co-registration" on courses offered in partnership with another institution and non-degree students)
- Location: Graz, Styria, Austria
- Website: www.kug.ac.at

The University of Music and Performing Arts Graz, also known as Kunstuniversität Graz (KUG) is an Austrian university. Its roots can be traced back to the music school of the Akademischer Musikverein founded in 1816, making it the oldest university of music in Austria.

== History ==
In 1963 the Conservatoire of the Province of Styria was elevated to an Austrian state institution – the Academy of Music and Performing Arts in Graz. Its president (1963–1971) was Erich Marckhl. As a result of the 1970 Kunsthochschulorganisationsgesetz [Universities of the Arts Organisation Act] the academy became the Hochschule für Musik und darstellende Kunst in Graz. Friedrich Korcak was appointed as the first rector in 1971.

A concert series was set up as early as 1982, in collaboration with the Association of Friends of the Hochschule für Musik und darstellende Kunst Graz, which at the time include three different series: the main concert series, abo@MUMUTH and the concert series for young audiences.

In 1983, KUG (at that time still a Hochschule) was granted the authority to award degrees. The first doctoral degree programme was offered in 1986, and the first graduation ceremony was held on 21 June 1991. KUG received its current name in 1998, when the Federal Act on Organisation of Universities of the Arts (KUOG 98) came into effect and all Austrian art academies were renamed "universities".

In September 2009, academic and artistic doctoral schools were established at the University of Music and Performing Arts Graz. With its Dr.artium programme, KUG became the first university in Austria (and according to the university itself, the first institution in the German-speaking countries), to offer an artistic doctorate degree. This academic doctoral school replaced the previous inter-university philosophy and science doctoral degrees. The first artistic doctoral degree was completed at KUG in 2013.

In the winter semester 2019/2020 there were 1903 students taking degree courses at KUG (1512 primarily registered at KUG and 391 taking courses offered in partnership with another institution and primarily registered at the partner institution under "official co-registration"), plus 296 non-degree students. The proportion of women was 47%. The proportion of foreign students was 50% (for students taking degree courses and primarily registered at KUG), or just below 52% (taking into account "official co-registration" and non-degree students, particularly the programmes for promotion of emerging talent, and for children and young people).

Since 1989, KUG has held an Franz Schubert and Modern Music Competition every three years.

== Leadership ==
- 1963–1971: Erich Marckhl (founding president)
- 1971–1979: Friedrich Korcak (first appointed rector)
- 1979–1987: Otto Kolleritsch
- 1987–1991: Sebastian Benda
- 1991–2007: Otto Kolleritsch
- 2007–2012: Georg Schulz
- 2013–2014: Robert Höldrich (Executive Vice-Rector, interim)
- 2014–2018: Elisabeth Freismuth
- 2018–2020: Eike Straub
- Since 1 March 2020: Georg Schulz

It was announced that Georg Schulz would return as rector in October 2018. Due to an appeal by the Equal Opportunities Committee relating to alleged discrimination against Rector Freismuth (who was still in office) on the basis of gender, age and ideology, from 1 October 2018 an interim rectorship was instated under the leadership of Executive Vice-Rector Eike Straub. At the start of the summer semester 2020 Georg Schulz took up the rectorship again. His team consists of Vice-Rectors Gerd Grupe (Research, Gender and Diversity), Barbara Simandl (Finance and HR administration), Constanze Wimmer (Academic and international Affairs) and Marie-Theres Holler (Infrastructure and Digitalisation). Alongside his statutory duties as rector, Georg Schulz is also responsible for art and quality management.

== Campus ==
The Palais Meran has been the main building of the University of Music and Performing Arts Graz since 1963 and is used not only as a venue for events, but also by several institutes and administrative bodies. It was built between 1841 and 1843 in the late classical style by Georg Hauberisser senior on the grounds of a former Meierhof, (a building occupied by the estate administrator) and was the residence of Styrian Habsburg Archduke Johann.

The MUMUTH project took first prize in an international competition won by Dutch architect Ben van Berkel in 1998. It was opened in 2009 and is dominated by steel, concrete and glass in various combinations and superimpositions. As well as the large György-Ligeti-Saal, a concert space with an elaborate system of variable acoustics, it offers an orchestra rehearsal space and a rehearsal stage, plus additional studios, workshops and theatre infrastructure. In 2010 MUMUTH was awarded the Fischer von Erlach Prize and the Urban Land Institute Award for its architecture.

The Neubau [New Building] was constructed between 1988 and 1993 based on plans by Viennese architect, Klaus Musil. It is also known as the "Piano", because of its footprint. The first floor holds ensemble and seminar rooms, while the extended top floor boasts 83 rooms for individual tuition. On the ground floor are the canteen and the Aula (auditorium). The neighbouring building, erected in 1998, houses the library and the archive.

The Theater im Palais (T.i.P.) is home to the Institute of Drama and its rehearsal spaces and stage areas. The building, which is separated from the palace itself by the courtyard, was originally used as a cart shed and stables. In 2013/14 the building was renovated based on plans by architect Johannes Wohofsky, and extended with a new glass foyer giving a view of the old facade. The exterior shell in front of the facade, made from gold-coloured, perforated aluminium sheet creates a visual design feature and provides shade from the sun.

The Reiterkaserne, which is a listed building, was built in the 1840s to accommodate cavalrymen, and served as barracks for around 100 years. It has been renovated since 2005 on the basis of plans by Graz-based architect Josef Hohensinn. The building encloses a courtyard, and a new structure has been added facing onto Leonhardstrasse. Since 2007 it has housed teaching rooms and office space (particularly for the Institute of Music Education), concert halls and the workshops of the Institute of Stage Design.

The former Palais Schwarzenberg, which originates from the 16th century, contains the Institute of Church Music and Organ, together with its Centre for Organ Research, on two floors. The historic arcade courtyard is one of the outstanding architectural treasures of the old town of Graz. The institute's rooms include rehearsal spaces, a recording studio and offices, plus a total of nine pipe organs of different constructions, a digital electronic organ and other related instruments.

Other KUG facilities can be found at Brandhofgasse 18, Elisabethstrasse 11, Moserhofgasse 34 and 39–41, Heinrichstrasse 78, Inffeldgasse 10 and 12, Leonhardstrasse 18 and 21, Lichtenfelsgasse 21, Maiffredygasse 12b, Merangasse 38, Mozartgasse 3 and Petersgasse 116.[35] There is also a campus in Oberschützen (Burgenland). There is also a campus in Oberschützen (Burgenland).

== Artistic-Scientific Facilities ==
- Institute 1 Composition, Theory of Music, History of Music and Conducting
- Institute 2 Piano
- Institute 3 Strings
- Institute 4 Wind and Percussion Instruments
- Institute 5 Music in Society: Pedagogy – Mediation – Therapy
- Institute 6 Church Music and Organ
- Institute 7 Vocal Studies
- Institute 8 Jazz
- Institute 9 Drama
- Institute 10 Opera
- Institute 11 Stage Design
- Institute 12 Oberschützen
- Institute 13 Ethnomusicology
- Institute 14 Aesthetics of Music
- Institute 15 Early Music and Performance Practice
- Institute 16 Jazz and Popular Music Research
- Institute 17 Electronic Music and Acoustics
- Doctoral School for Scholarly Doctoral Studies
- Artistic Doctoral School
- Centre for Gender Studies
- Centre for Artistic Research

== Fields of Study ==
- Catholic and Protestant Church Music
- Composition and Music Theory: Composition, Opera Composition, Music Theory and Education in Composition and Music Theory
- Computer Music and Sound Art
- Conducting: Choral Conducting, Opera Repetiteur Work, Orchestral Conducting and Choral Conducting Education
- Doctoral Programmes: Doctoral Programme in Artistic Research (Dr.artium), Scholarly Doctoral Programme (PhD)
- Early Music
- Education in Choral Conducting
- Education in Composition and Music Theory
- Electrical Engineering and Audio Engineering (in collaboration with Graz University of Technology)
- Instrumental Studies Classical, Performance Practice in Contemporary Music (PPCM)
- Jazz: Vocals, Instruments, Jazz Composition and Arrangement
- Mediation of Music and Theatre
- Music Education - Voice and Instruments (IGP)
- Musicology (in collaboration with the University of Graz)
- Music therapy
- Performing Arts (Drama)
- Performance Practice in Contemporary Music (PPCM)
- Sound Design: Communication, Media, Sound and Interaction Design – (in partnership with the Fachhochschule Joanneum)
- Stage design
- Teacher Education Programme: Instrumental Music Education, Music Education, Technical and Textile Design (Lehramtsverbund Süd-Ost), Art Education (Lehramtsverbund Süd-Ost)
- Voice: Voice, Concert Singing, Opera Performance, Performance Practice in Contemporary Music (PPCM) – Vocal

Almost all courses are offered under the Bologna system, with three or four year bachelor's degrees, two year master's degrees and three year doctoral degrees. Exceptions to this are Stage Design and Performing Arts, both of which are four-year diploma courses.

== Honorary members ==
(brackets: year of award)

- Joseph Marx (1882–1964), Austrian composer (1963)
- Henri Gagnebin (1886–1977), Swiss composer (1963)
- Johann Nepomuk David (1895–1977), Austrian composer (1963)
- Karl Böhm (1894–1981), Austrian conductor (1964)
- Frank Martin (1890–1974), Swiss composer (1966)
- Zoltán Kodály (1882–1967), Hungarian composer (1966)
- Egon Wellesz (1885–1974), British-Austrian composer (1968)
- Darius Milhaud (1892–1974), French composer (1968)
- Luigi Dallapiccola (1904–1975), Italian composer (1969)
- Ernst Moravec, Austrian violinist (1969)
- Ernst Krenek (1900–1991), Austrian-born American composer (1969)
- Alfred Brendel (* 1931), Austrian pianist (1981)
- Andrés Segovia (1893–1987), Spanish guitarist (1985)
- Gundula Janowitz (* 1937), Austrian singer (1986)
- Jenő Takács (1902–2005), pianist (1987)
- Christa Ludwig (1928–2021), German singer (1988)
- György Ligeti (1923–2006), Hungarian composer (1989)
- Nikolaus Harnoncourt (1929–2016), Austrian conductor and music researcher (1995)
- Art Farmer (1928–1999), American jazz trumpeter (1998)
- Hans Werner Henze (1926–2012), German composer (1999)
- Josef "Joe" Zawinul (1932–2007), Austrian jazz musician (2002)
- Otto Kolleritsch (* 1934), KUG Rector Emeritus (2004)
- Sheila Jordan (* 1928), American jazz musician (2015)

== Honorary doctorate ==
- Phil Collins (* 1951), British musician (2019)

== Notable professors ==
- Julian Argüelles (* 1966), jazz saxophonist
- Ulf Bästlein (* 1959), singer
- Ida Bieler (* 1950), violinist
- Alex Goodman (* 1987), jazz guitarist
- Luis Bonilla (* um 1965), jazz trombonist
- Joseph Breinl, pianist and vocal accompanist
- Petrit Çeku, guitarist
- Marko Ciciliani, composition and multimedia
- Milana Chernyavska, pianist
- Chia Chou, pianist
- Howard Curtis, jazz drummer
- Dena DeRose (* 1966), jazz singer
- André Doehring (* 1973), musicologist (jazz and popular music)
- Andreas Dorschel (* 1962), philosopher
- Julius Drake (* 1959), vocal accompanist
- Beat Furrer (* 1954), composer
- Erich Kleinschuster (1930–2018), jazz trombonist and composer
- Yair Kless, (* 1940), violinist
- Gerd Kühr (* 1952), composer
- Boris Kuschnir (* 1948), violinist
- Klaus Lang (* 1971), composer
- Silvia Marcovici, violinist
- Marc Piollet (* 1962), conductor
- Franz Karl Praßl (* 1954), theologian, church musician und composer
- Gerald Preinfalk (* 1971), saxophonist
- Peter Revers (* 1954), musicologist
- Markus Schirmer (* 1963), pianist
- Olivier Tambosi (* 1963), opera director
- Peter Verhoyen, piccolo player
- Wolfgang Wengenroth, conductor

== Former students and graduates ==
- Mirca Župnek Sancin (1901–1970), Slovenian composer and pianist
- Peter Simonischek (* 1946), Austrian actor
- Marjana Lipovšek (* 1946), Slovenian singer
- Mathias Rüegg (* 1952), Swiss composer and jazz pianist
- August Schmölzer (* 1958), Austrian actor
- Fabio Luisi (* 1959), Italian conductor
- Martin Kušej (* 1961), Austrian director
- Marion Mitterhammer (* 1965), Austrian actor
- Klaus T. Steindl (* 1966), Austrian director
- Norbert Trawöger (* 1971), Austrian flautist
- Andreas Großbauer (* 1974), Austrian violinist
- Nenad Vasilić (* 1975), Serbian-born Austrian jazz bass player and composer
- Andreas Reize (* 19 May 1975), organist and conductor, Thomaskantor
- Martina Tomčić (* 1975), Croatian opera singer
- Annette Dasch (* 1976), German opera singer
- Ľuboš Šrámek (born 1977), Slovak composer, jazz pianist, teacher and music producer
- Evelin Novak (* 1985), Croatian opera singer
- Mirga Gražinytė-Tyla (* 1986), Lithuanian conductor
- Paula Šūmane (* 1989), Latvian violinist
- Katia Ledoux (* 1990), French opera singer
- Diana Tishchenko (* 1990), Ukrainian violinist
- Patrick Hahn (* 1995), Austrian conductor
- Sabine Grofmeier (* 1999), German classical clarinetist
