= Radovan Tariška =

- Born: 14 August 1979 (age 46); Levice, Slovakia
- Genres: Jazz, post-bop, bebop
- Occupations: Musician, composer, bandleader
- Instrument: saxophone
- Website: radovantariska.com

Radovan Tariška (born 14 August 1979) is a Slovak jazz saxophonist.

== Biography ==
Radovan Tariška was born in Levice, Slovakia on 14 August 1979. He started to play music at the age of 5, after being encouraged by his grandfather, who played saxophone and clarinet. At the age of 12, Tariška started to study clarinet at Primary art school in Tlmače. He is a 1998 graduate of Conservatory of Zilina, where he studied alto saxophone. As a member of The Slovak Young Swing Generation Big Band, he performed at Bratislava Jazz Days festival in 1997.

Tariška has been a member of Gustav Brom Big Band since 2001. In 2002 he was honoured with a prize The Jazzman of the Year by the Slovak Jazz Society for his outstanding instrumental performance.

In 2006, Tariška recorded Elements, his first album as a bandleader, for the Music Centre label as a duo with a pianist Ondrej Krajnak. This album was nominated for the jazz and blues album of the year at the Aurel Awards for 2006.

In 2005 he put together an international sextet with Ryan Carniaux (trumpet, US), Ondrej Stveracek (tenor saxophone, Czech Republic), Ondrej Krajnak (piano, Slovakia), Tomas Baros (double bass, Czech Republic), Marian Sevcik (drums, Slovakia). With his international sextet, he released his second album, Radovan Tariška Sextet, in 2009 on the Music Centre label.

Tariška recorded the album Folklore To Jazz, alongside Essiet Okon (bass), Benito Gonzalez (piano), David Hodek (drums) and others. In 2013, the album was nominated for a Radiohead Award and an Esprit Award as the best jazz album of the year.

In 2015, Tariška was nominated for the Crystal Wing Awards.

== Discography ==
=== As Leader ===
- Elementy (Hudobne centrum, 2006)
- Radovan Tariška Sextet (Hudobne centrum, 2009)
- Folklore to Jazz (Hunnia Records & Film Production, 2013)

=== As sideman ===
- Peter Lipa: Beatles in Blue(s), (East West, 2002)
- Gabo Jonáš Quartet: Live (Slovak Radio Records, 2002)
- Miki Skuta: Identity (DS Consult, 2002)
- Libiaková Dáša: To nič (Allegro, 2002)
- Matúš Jakabčic Quartet (2002)
- Fuse Jazz: Labytint (Hudobny fond, 2003)
- Hot House: Live (Hudobný fond, 2003)
- Oskar Rózsa Sextet (Hevethia,2003)
- Kabelková Žofie: Žiju (Indies Records, 2003)
- Olga Škrancová: When I Fall in Love (Amplion Records, 2003)
- Luboš Šrámek and His Five Reasons With Guests: Correspondance (Hudobný Fond, 2005)
- Erik Rothenstein & his Rainbow Project: Prater Menuet (Hudobné centrum, 2005)
- Pavol Bodnár & InterJAZZional Band: Ecce Jazz (Hevhetia, 2007)
- Hanka Gregušvá: Reflections of my Sloul (Hudobny fond, 2007)
- Matúš Jakabčic CZ/SK Big Band featuring Harry Sokal (Orf, 2007)
- Juraj Bartoš: Hot House / Jazz na hradě (Multisonic, 2009)
- Dávid Hodek Quartet: The First (Hudobné centrum, 2010)
- Matúš Jakabčic CZ-SK Big Band (Multisonic, 2010)
- Hanka Gregusova: Essence (Hevhetia, 2014)
