= Daniel Froschauer =

Austrian violinist

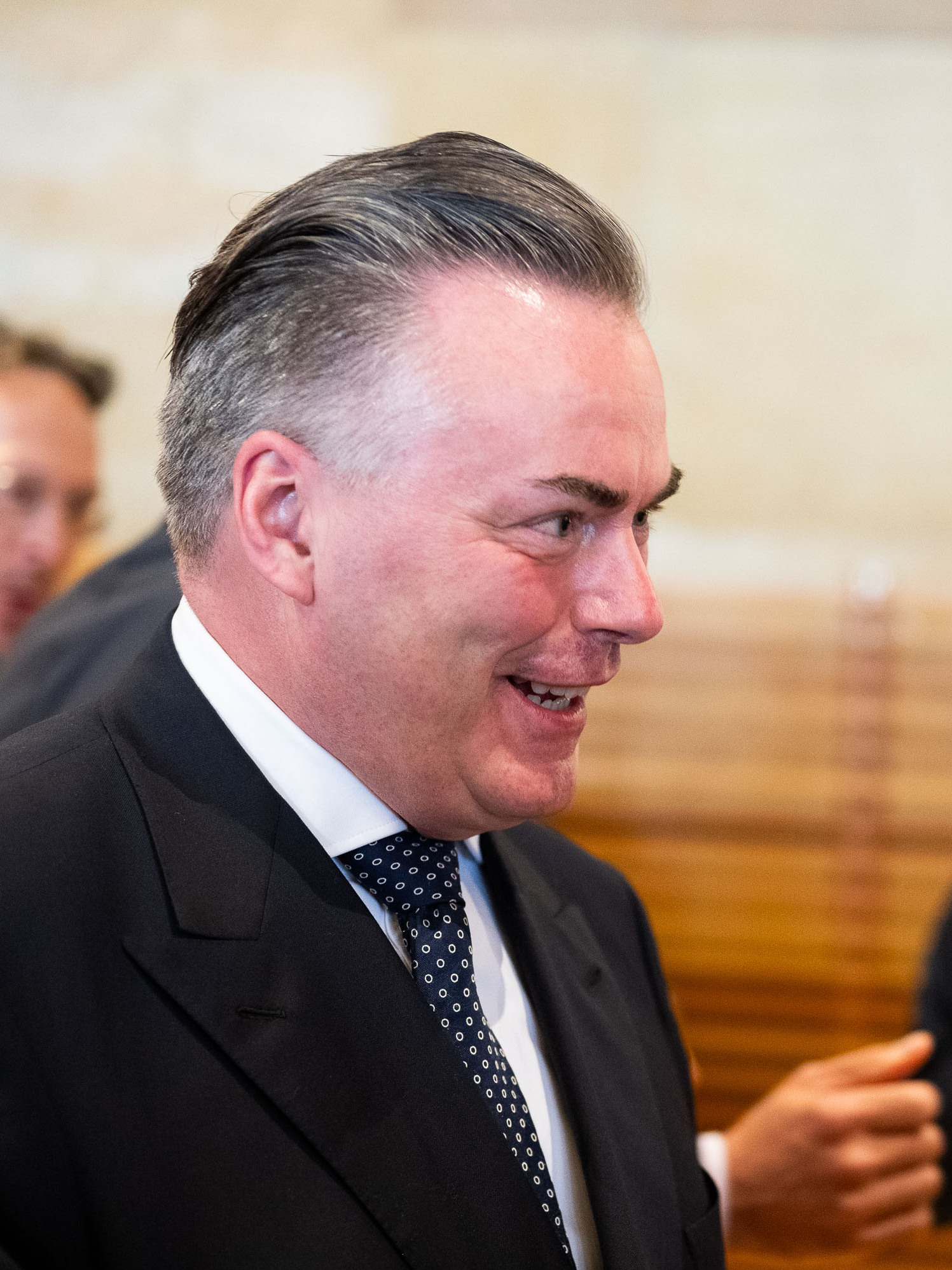
2023 Image of Daniel Froschauer

Daniel Froschauer (born 30 December 1965) is an Austrian classical violinist and member of the board of directors of the Vienna Philharmonic.

== Career ==
Born in Vienna, Froschauer was born the son of the conductor and choir director of the Vienna State Opera, Helmuth Froschauer. He studied at the Juilliard School in New York with Dorothy DeLay and Masao Kawasaki. He received his education from Pinchas Zukerman as well as from the professors Alfred Staar and Alfred Altenburger in Vienna.

In 1990, Froschauer received the Young Artist Award from Musical America in New York. In 1997, he won the Pierre Lantier international competition in Paris. As a soloist, Froschauer played with the Mozarteum Orchestra Salzburg and the New York Symphonic Ensemble. As a soloist he made his debut in 1993 with a sonata evening in the Brahms Hall of the Wiener Musikverein.

In 1998, Froschauer joined the group of first violins in the State Opera Orchestra and the Orchestra of the Vienna Philharmonic, of which he has been the principal violinist since 2004. Froschauer plays the violin "Ex Benvenuti, ex Halphen" by Antonio Stradivari from 1727 on loan from the Angelika Prokopp Foundation.

On 1 September 2017, he replaced Andreas Großbauer in the function of chairman of the Board of the Philharmonic Orchestra.
