= Marion Mitterhammer =

Austrian actress (born 1965)

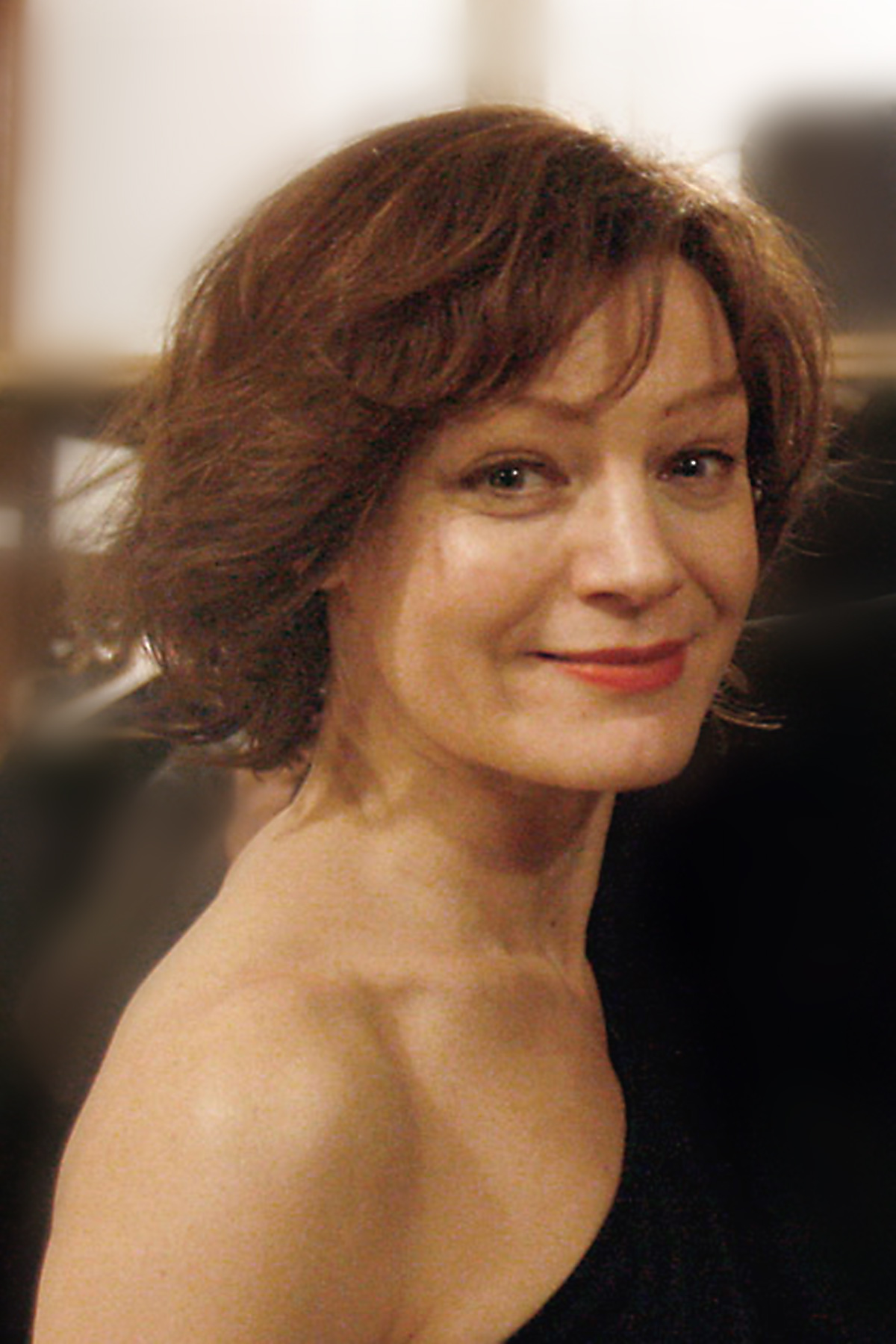
- Born: 8 August 1965 (age 60); Bruck an der Mur

Marion Mitterhammer (born 8 August 1965) is an Austrian actress.

== Biography ==
Marion Mitterhammer was born in Bruck an der Mur in 1965. Mitterhammer studied acting at the University of Music and Performing Arts Graz. Her first roles were at Theater Baden-Baden and at the Salzburg Festival where she worked with Jürgen Flimm and Thomas Langhoff. In 1990 Mitterhammer toured with a production of Anton Chekhov. Mitterhammer then worked for two years in Vienna. She started working on television in 1992 and was awarded Young actress of the Year by the Austrian film jury for 1994. She was awarded the 2017 Austrian Film Award for Best Female Supporting Role.

== Personal life ==
Mitterhammer is married to the German film director and cameraman Hans-Günther Bücking. Mitterhammer shared that she has Alopecia areata, first noticed when she was 16. Since then her hair came and went until 1990 when her hair finally failed entirely.
