= Werner Resel =

German classical cellist (born 1935)

Werner Resel (born 22 June 1935) is a German cellist. From 1987 to 1997, he was chairman of the Vienna Philharmonic.

== Life ==
Born in Essen, from 1949 Resel studied cello with Richard Krotschak at the Vienna Music Academy. From 1955 to 1959, he was solo cellist of the Tonkünstler Orchestra.

In 1959, Walter Weller, Josef Kondor, Helmut Weis and Resel founded the Weller Quartet. In 1959, Resel became a member of the Vienna State Opera and in 1962 a member of the Vienna Philharmonic Orchestra, of which he was its managing director from 1982 to 1986. In 1987, he succeeded Alfred Altenburger (born 1927) as Chairman of the Vienna Philharmonic, being replaced in this role by Clemens Hellsberg in 1997. In 2006, he retired as cellist of the Vienna Philharmonic.

Resel is vice president of the Johann Strauss-Gesellschaft Wien. In 1995, he was a guest on the ORF show Phettbergs Nette Leit Show.

== Discography ==
- Weller Quartet: Kammermusik Für Waldhorn Und Streicher, Amadeo
- Chamber Music Of The Late 18th Century, Mace Records 1970
- Franz Schmidt: Quintette, Preiser Records 1964

== Honours ==
- 1992: Wiener Ehrenmedaille in Gold.
- 1993: Golden Medal of Honour of the Johann Strauss Society Vienna.
- 1995: Österreichisches Ehrenzeichen für Wissenschaft und Kunst 1st class.
- 2001: Doyen and honorary member of the Vienna State Opera.
- Berufstitel Professor
