= Waltraud Meier =

German opera singer (born 1956)

Waltraud Meier (born 9 January 1956) is a German retired dramatic soprano and mezzo-soprano singer. She is particularly known for her Wagnerian roles as Kundry, Isolde, Ortrud, Venus, Fricka, and Sieglinde, but has also had success in the French and Italian repertoire appearing as Eboli, Amneris, Carmen, and Santuzza. She resides in Munich.

Meier has performed in the world's famed opera houses (including La Scala, Covent Garden, Metropolitan Opera, the Vienna State Opera, the Bavarian State Opera, Lyric Opera of Chicago, and Colón Theater). She performed Wagner at the Mecca of Wagner performance, the Bayreuth Festspielhaus. She has performed under the batons of conductors including Riccardo Muti, Daniel Barenboim, Claudio Abbado, James Levine, Lorin Maazel, Zubin Mehta, and Giuseppe Sinopoli. She has been named a "Kammersängerin" by both the Bavarian State Opera in Munich and the Vienna State Opera, and "Commandeur" of the Ordre des Arts et des Lettres by the French Government.

== Education, vocal training and early career ==
Waltraud Meier was born in Würzburg, West Germany. She sang in various choral groups during her younger years. Upon finishing her secondary education, she began graduate studies in English and Romance Languages while also taking voice lessons. She studied singing with Professor Dietger Jacob. In 1976, she decided to concentrate on a singing career and soon thereafter debuted at the Würzburg Opera as Lola in Cavalleria rusticana. Over the next several years she performed regularly at the opera house in Mannheim (1976–78).

== 1980s ==
She made her international debut in 1980 at the Teatro Colón in Buenos Aires, appearing as Fricka in Die Walküre. She continued to appear regularly in West Germany at the opera houses in Dortmund (1980–1983), Hanover (1983–1984) and Stuttgart (1985–88). Following a success as Kundry in Wagner's Parsifal at the 1983 Bayreuth Festival, Meier's international career gained momentum, and she had debuts at Covent Garden (1985) and the Metropolitan Opera (1987) (as Fricka, with James Levine conducting his first Das Rheingold at the Met).

She also had debuts at La Scala, the Opéra National in Paris, the Vienna State Opera and the Bavarian State Opera in Munich. She continued to appear regularly at Bayreuth as Kundry between 1983 and 1992.

== 1990s ==
In addition to appearing as Kundry at Bayreuth, Meier continued to appear elsewhere in the role during the 1990s, including a 1991 production at La Scala under the baton of Riccardo Muti and at the Théâtre du Châtelet in Paris, in a version staged by Klaus Michael Grüber and conducted by Semyon Bychkov. In 1992, she appeared for the first time as Kundry at the Metropolitan Opera, opposite Siegfried Jerusalem as Parsifal, with James Levine conducting. The New York Times reported: "Waltraud Meier, bringing her acclaimed performance as Kundry to the Met for the first time, was seductive and gentle in her first approach to Parsifal, holding in reserve a strength and determination that gave her singing an eerie calm." The following year, Meier returned to the Met as Santuzza in Cavalleria rusticana. Of that performance, The New York Times wrote:

As Santuzza in "Cavalleria", Waltraud Meier was superb at the first performance on Friday evening, singing clearly and evenly throughout her range, carrying lines smoothly and coloring her tone richly. She gradually worked an incisive, telling edge into her voice without sacrificing its basic beauty; even her shrieks were musical. And she projected a riveting dramatic presence, convincingly fragile as well as ferocious.

During the 1990s, Meier also moved into roles within the dramatic soprano repertoire. Between 1993 and 1999, she appeared at Bayreuth as Isolde in Tristan und Isolde staged by Heiner Müller and conducted by Daniel Barenboim. In 1998 she added additional dramatic soprano roles, debuting as Leonore in Fidelio with the Chicago Symphony Orchestra, again under the direction of Barenboim, and also appearing as Ortrud in a new Lohengrin production at the Bavarian State Opera.

== 2000s ==
In 2000, Meier appeared again at Bayreuth, performing the role of Sieglinde in Die Walküre in the "Millennium Ring" at the 2000 festival staged by Jürgen Flimm and conducted by Giuseppe Sinopoli with Plácido Domingo. She also appeared that year as Isolde at the Salzburg Festival, with Lorin Maazel conducting. In 2001 at the opening of the Munich Opera Festival, the singer made her debut in the role of Didon in Hector Berlioz's Les Troyens with Zubin Mehta conducting. In 2003 Meier shared a Grammy Award for Best Opera Recording for her contributions as Venus in Tannhäuser under the direction of Daniel Barenboim. She devoted her 2003–2004 season exclusively to recitals and concerts. She performed in Bach's St Matthew Passion and toured throughout Europe, Russia and the United States with a recital program featuring works by Brahms, Schubert and Hugo Wolf.

She returned to the opera stage in 2004–2005, including appearances as Carmen in a new production at the Semper Oper in Dresden directed by Katarina Lauterbach. In 2005, she appeared again as Isolde, this time in a new production at the Opéra Bastille in Paris, staged by Peter Sellars and conducted by Esa-Pekka Salonen. She also returned to the Vienna State Opera as Kundry in Parsifal. She returned as Kundry in the Met's Parsifal in 2006, appearing opposite Ben Heppner. The New York Times wrote:

The role of Kundry is that of a lone woman surrounded by men, but Waltraud Meier made it the star turn of the evening. Known as volatile both onstage and off, Ms. Meier is suited to the part, propelling herself into it like a wide-bore, high-explosive cannon shell. This was singing of fierceness and fearlessness, all of it pertinent to the persona she represented. Ms. Meier gives all and takes risks, and her audience went crazy for her.

Meier's 2007 performances include appearances as Isolde (Japan, Berlin, Munich, Milan), Leonore (Munich), Ortrud (Milan, Paris). A CD featuring Meier and Breinl performing works by Franz Schubert and Richard Strauss, with her song accompanist Joseph Breinl was released in late 2007. Meier and Breinl are performing numerous recitals in 2007–08 in Japan, Germany, France, Austria, and Spain.

In July 2008, Meier appeared as Venus in a production of Tannhäuser in Baden-Baden, directed by Nikolaus Lehnhoff, conducted by Philippe Jordan, and also starring Robert Gambill (Tannhäuser), Stephen Milling (Herrmann), and Camilla Nylund (Elisabeth). The New York Times reported that "Ms. Meier, a musician with deep reserves of force and a gift for madness, was the perfect Venus." On 22 August 2009, she appeared in a televised concert performance of Fidelio at a Henry Wood Promenade Concert in London's Albert Hall in which she also spoke a narration. This was reported as her 2,000th professional engagement. It was conducted by Daniel Barenboim with the West-Eastern Divan (orchestra).

In the London Daily Telegraph Rupert Christiansen wrote:

She looked wonderfully elegant and was in good voice – some wild top notes seemed a small price to pay for her total musical and dramatic involvement in Leonore's fate. What a true star and a trouper she is.

In 2023, after a five decade long career, Meier announced she would retire from the stage. She gave her final performance on 20 October 2023 at the Berlin State Opera as Klytämnestra in Strauss' Elektra.

== Videography ==
- James Levine's 25th Anniversary Metropolitan Opera Gala (1996), Deutsche Grammophon DVD, B0004602-09 OCLC 894896498

== Sources ==
- Liese, Kirsten, Wagnerian Heroines. A Century Of Great Isoldes and Brünnhildes, English translation: Charles Scribner, Edition Karo, Berlin, 2013. OCLC 844683799
