= Hanna Ludwig =

German contralto

- Born: 10 January 1918; Lauterach, Bavaria
- Died: 11 March 2014 (aged 96); Salzburg, Austria
- Occupations: Operatic contralto; Operatic mezzo-soprano; Academic teacher
- Organizations: Deutsche Oper am Rhein: Cologne Opera; Mozarteum

Hanna Ludwig (10 January 1918 – 11 March 2014) was a German contralto and mezzo-soprano and an academic voice teacher. She participated in several roles at the first Bayreuth Festival after World War II and performed leading roles at major European opera houses, such as the title role of Der Rosenkavalier at the Vienna State Opera. She toured the world as a lieder singer. After retiring from the stage she turned to teaching in Ankara and, from 1971, at the Mozarteum.

== Life ==
Born in Lauterach, Bavaria, Ludwig received voice lessons in Munich from Luise Willer and Rudolf Hartmann, and also from Franziska Martienssen-Lohmann. She made her stage debut at the Theater Koblenz in 1949. From 1951 to 1952, she worked at the Stadttheater Freiburg.

In 1951, she was invited by Wieland Wagner to perform at the first Bayreuth Festival after World War II. She appeared as Fricka, Rossweiße and Wellgunde in Der Ring des Nibelungen and as a flower maiden as well as a squire in Parsifal. The following year, she was Waltraute in Die Walküre instead of Fricka.

Her next engagement was at the Deutsche Oper am Rhein, where she was engaged from 1952. At La Scala in Milan, she appeared as Waltraute in Die Walküre in 1955 and as a page in Salome in 1956. At the Vienna State Opera, she gave guest performances from 1956 to 1962, as Octavian in Der Rosenkavalier and as the composer in Ariadne auf Naxos, both by Richard Strauss, and as Iocasta in Stravinsky's Oedipus Rex. Further guest performances led her to the Teatro San Carlo (1952), at La Fenice in Venice, to Amsterdam, Zurich (1955 as Clairon in Capriccio), Barcelona, Dublin, and Geneva. In 1958 she gave a guest performance in Ariadne auf Naxos at the Holland Festival.

From 1959 to 1968, she belonged to the ensemble of the Cologne Opera. On 23 November 1959, she took part in the world premiere of Nicolas Nabokov's Rasputin's End. Guest performances took her to the opera houses of Washington, D.C. and the Teatro Lirico Giuseppe Verdi, among others. Roles in Ludwig's repertoire were Dorabella in Mozart's Così fan tutte, Orfeo in Gluck's Orfeo ed Euridice, Cherubino in Mozart's Le nozze di Figaro, Ortrud in Wagner's Lohengrin, Brangäne in Tristan und Isolde, Kundry in Parsifal, Clairon in Capriccio by Richard Strauss, Baroness Grünwiesel in Henze's Der junge Lord, Eboli in Verdi's Don Carlos, the title role in Bizet's Carmen, and Nicklausse in Offenbach's Hoffmann's Erzählungen.

In concert, she sang the alto solo in Mozart's Requiem at the Salzburg Festival in 1963. She was known as a lieder singer worldwide, touring the Americas and Japan and other parts of Asia.

Ludwig retired from the stage in 1968. She then taught at the Ankara Academy of Music and from 1971 at the Mozarteum in Salzburg, where she was appointed professor in 1983. In 1987, she held master classes in Manila and Hong Kong.

Ludwig died in Salzburg at the age of 96.
