= Franziska Martienssen-Lohmann =

- Franziska Martienssen-Lohmann, c. 1920
- Born: Carolina Wilhelmine Franziska Meyer-Estorf; 6 October 1887; Bromberg
- Died: 2 February 1971 (aged 83); Düsseldorf, Germany
- Occupations: Soprano; Voice teacher; Writer
- Organizations: Robert Schumann Konservatorium
- Awards: Mozart Medal

Franziska Martienssen-Lohmann, née Meyer-Estorf (6 October 1887 – 2 February 1971) was a German soprano who focused on Lieder singing, and a voice teacher who gave master classes internationally, in collaboration with her husband. She wrote books about teaching singing which have remained standards in the field.

== Life ==
She was born Carolina Wilhelmine Franziska Meyer-Estorf in Bromberg in northern Poland, where she received vocal training. She studied piano in Leipzig with Robert Teichmüller, graduating in 1911. The following year, she married Carl Adolf Martienssen, a pianist and piano teacher. She studied voice in Berlin with Johannes Messchaert, and first appeared in concert in 1914.

She became known as a lieder singer in Germany and abroad. Divorced in 1927, she became a teacher at the Akademie der Tonkunst in Munich. She met Paul Lohmann (1894–1981), who became her closest colleague, and they married. From 1930 to 1945, she worked at the Akademie für Kirchen- und Schulmusik in Berlin, from 1945 to 1949 at the Musikhochschule Weimar, and from 1950 at the Robert Schumann Konservatorium in Düsseldorf. Together with her husband, she gave master classes in Potsdam, Salzburg, Lucerne and Scandinavia.

Her books about singing and voice training have remained standard textbooks. Ausbildung der Gesangsstimme (The development of the singing voice) presented guidance, rather than rules, for singing. In three parts, it provides information about singing technique for beginners, a case history exemplifying points, and use of the voice in songs. Der wissende Sänger – Gesangslexikon in Skizzen (The cognisant singer / Lexicon of singing in sketches) first appeared in Zürich in 1956 published by Atlantis Musikbuch, and was republished in 2010 by Schott. As its sub-title indicates, its 312 entries are ordered alphabetically. Lieder singer Dietrich Fischer-Dieskau wrote in his "Introduction" that he was "tempted to memorize whole sections of it for inspiration". He expressed a wish that non-musicians would also read it in order to become more aware of the "height and depth" of the singer's experience of singing. A review in English considered that the book was "very readable" with a "pleasant style", and recommended it to the general reader "interested in learning more about the complexities of the 'human' instrument."

Martienssen-Lohmann died in Düsseldorf aged 83. Sigrid Gloede and Ruth Grünhagen wrote a biography Franziska Martienssen-Lohmann – Ein Leben für die Sänger (... a life for the singers), published in 1993. Among her students are the contralto Hanna Ludwig and the tenor Hermin Esser.

== Works ==
Publications by Martienssen-Lohmann are held by the German National Library, including books about lieder singing, but also poems.

- Die echte Gesangskunst. 1914.
- Das bewußte Singen: Grundlegung des Gesangstudiums. 1926. "C. F. Kahnt, now at C. F. Peters"
- Landschaft – Menschen – Ich. Gedichte. 1925. "poems, with a preface by Ricarda Huch"
- Stimme und Gestaltung. 1927. "C. F Kahnt, now Peters"
- Berufung und Bewährung des Opernsängers. 1943. "now titled Der Opernsänger, Schott Music)"
- Ausbildung der Gesangsstimme. 1950. "Rud. Erdmann Musikverlag- first in 1937 titled Ausbildung der menschlichen Stimme"
- Der wissende Sänger. 1956. "Atlantis Musikbuch"
- Gestern und immer. Gedichte. 1966. "poems, Atlantis Verlag"

== Awards ==
- 1958: Mozart Medal of the Mozart Society of Vienna
