= Piano Sonata No. 16 (Mozart) =

1788 composition by W. A. Mozart

- Sonata facile
- by W. A. Mozart
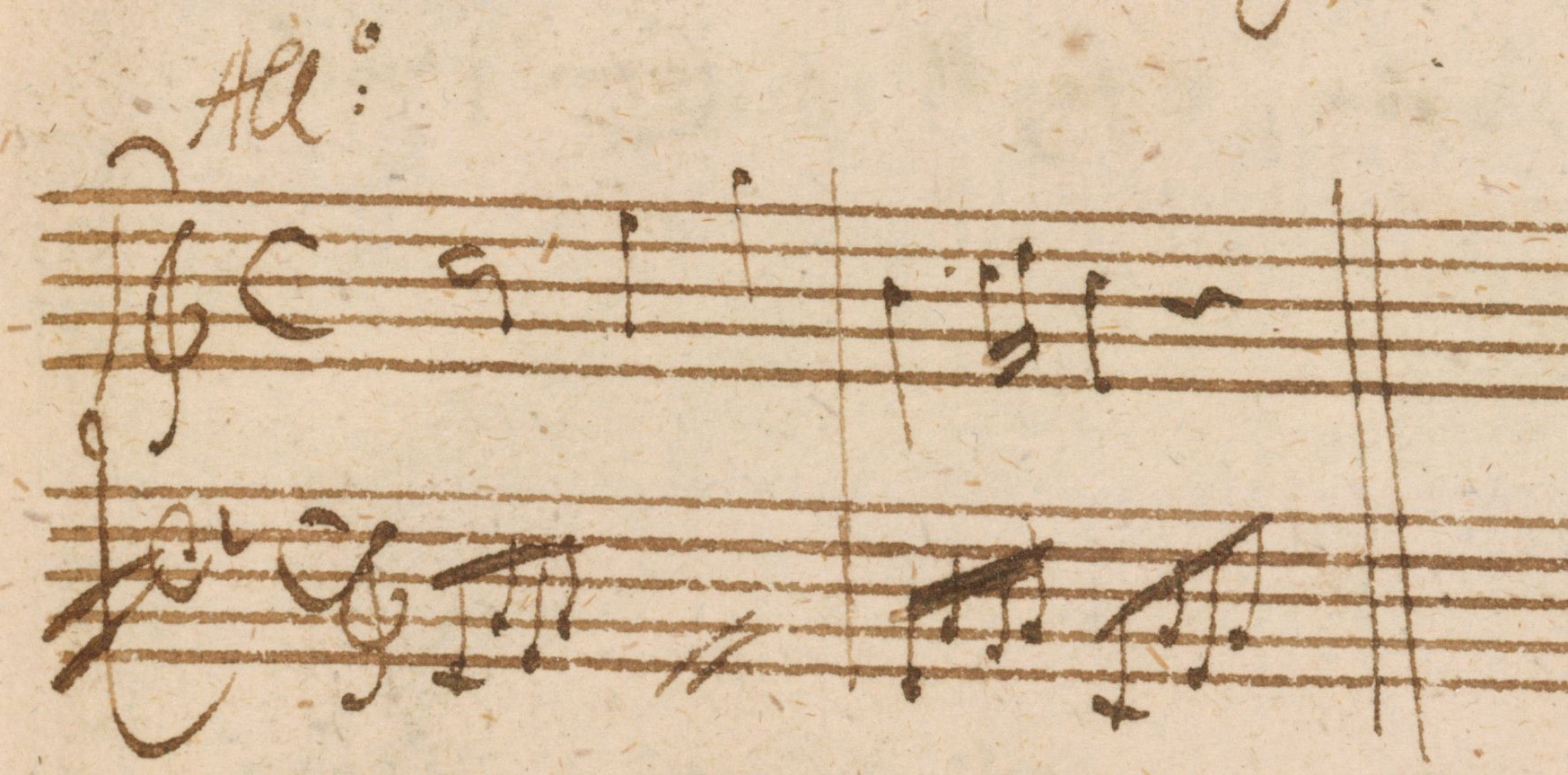
- First two bars from Mozart's own catalogue works
- Other name: Sonata semplice
- Key: C major
- Catalogue: K. 545
- Style: Classical period
- Composed: 1788
- Published: 1805
- Movements: Three (Allegro, Andante, Rondo)

The Piano Sonata No. 16 in C major, K. 545, by Wolfgang Amadeus Mozart was described by Mozart in his own thematic catalogue as "a little piano sonata for beginners" (Eine kleine klavier Sonate für anfänger). It is commonly known by the nickname Sonata facile or Sonata semplice.

Mozart added the work to his catalogue on June 26, 1788, the same date as his Symphony No. 39. The exact circumstances of the work's composition are unknown. Although the piece is well known today, it was not published in Mozart's lifetime and first appeared in print in 1805. A typical performance takes about 11 minutes.

== The music ==
The work has three movements:

1. Allegro,
2. Andante, 3/4 in G major
3. Rondo: Allegretto, 2/4

=== I. Allegro ===
I. Allegro

The first movement is written in sonata form and is in the key of C major. The familiar opening theme is accompanied by an Alberti bass, played in the left hand.

A bridge passage composed of scales follows, arriving at a cadence in G major, the key in which the second theme is then played. A codetta follows to conclude the exposition, then the exposition is repeated. The development starts in G minor and modulates through several keys. The recapitulation begins, unusually, in the subdominant key of F major. The Alberti bass that began as a C major triad at this point becomes an F major triad, followed by a left hand F major scale pattern which emulates the rhythm of the previous right hand A minor scale.

According to Charles Rosen, the practice of beginning a recapitulation in the subdominant was "rare at the time [the sonata] was written", though the practice was later taken up by Franz Schubert.

=== II. Andante ===
II. Andante
performed by Bernd Krueger

The second movement is in the key of G major, the dominant key of C major. The music modulates to the dominant key of D major, and then back to G major in which the exposition is heard again. For the development, the music modulates to G minor, then B♭ major, then C minor, then G minor and finally back to G major, at which point the recapitulation occurs followed by a short coda.

=== III. Rondo: Allegretto ===
III. Rondo allegretto
performed by Bernd Krueger

The third movement is in Rondo form and is in the tonic key, C major. The first theme is lively and sets the mood of the piece. The second theme is in G major and contains an Alberti bass in the left hand. The first theme appears again and is followed by a third theme. The third theme is in a minor key and modulates through many different keys before modulating into C major. The first theme appears again followed by a coda and finally ends in C major.

The finale was transposed to F major and combined with a solo piano arrangement of the second movement of the violin sonata in F major to form the posthumously compiled and thus spurious Piano Sonata in F major, K. 547a.

== Other arrangements ==
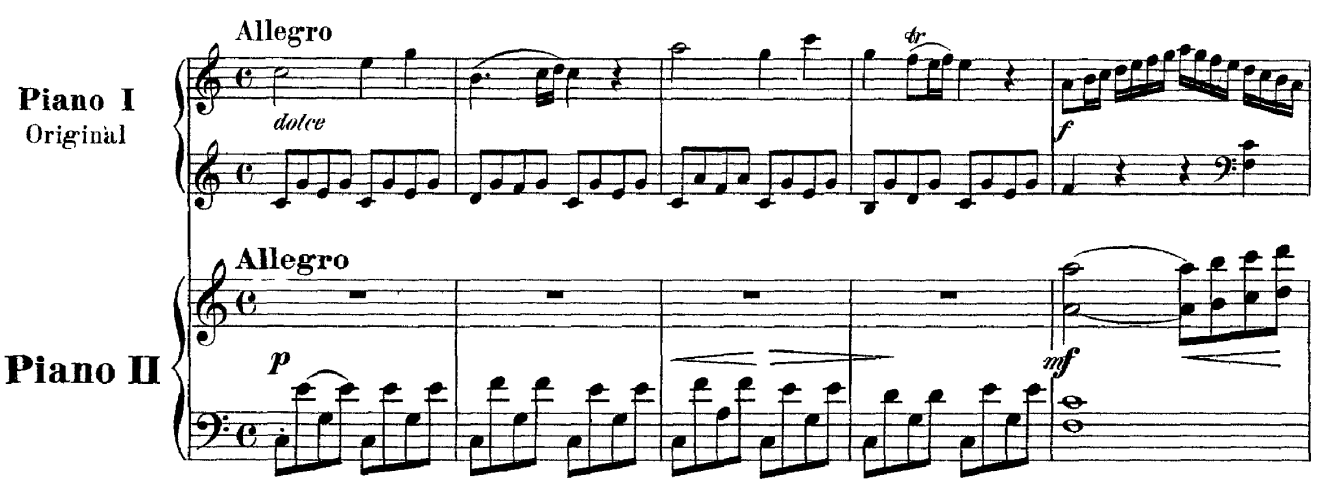
First line of Grieg's arrangement

In 1876–1877, Edvard Grieg arranged this sonata for two pianos, by adding further accompaniment on the second piano part, whilst the first piano part plays the original as Mozart wrote it. Grieg's intent was to "impart to several of Mozart's sonatas a tonal effect appealing to our modern ears".

The jazz musician Raymond Scott adapted the opening theme of the first movement for his piece "In an Eighteenth Century Drawing Room".
