= Freystadt =

- Town
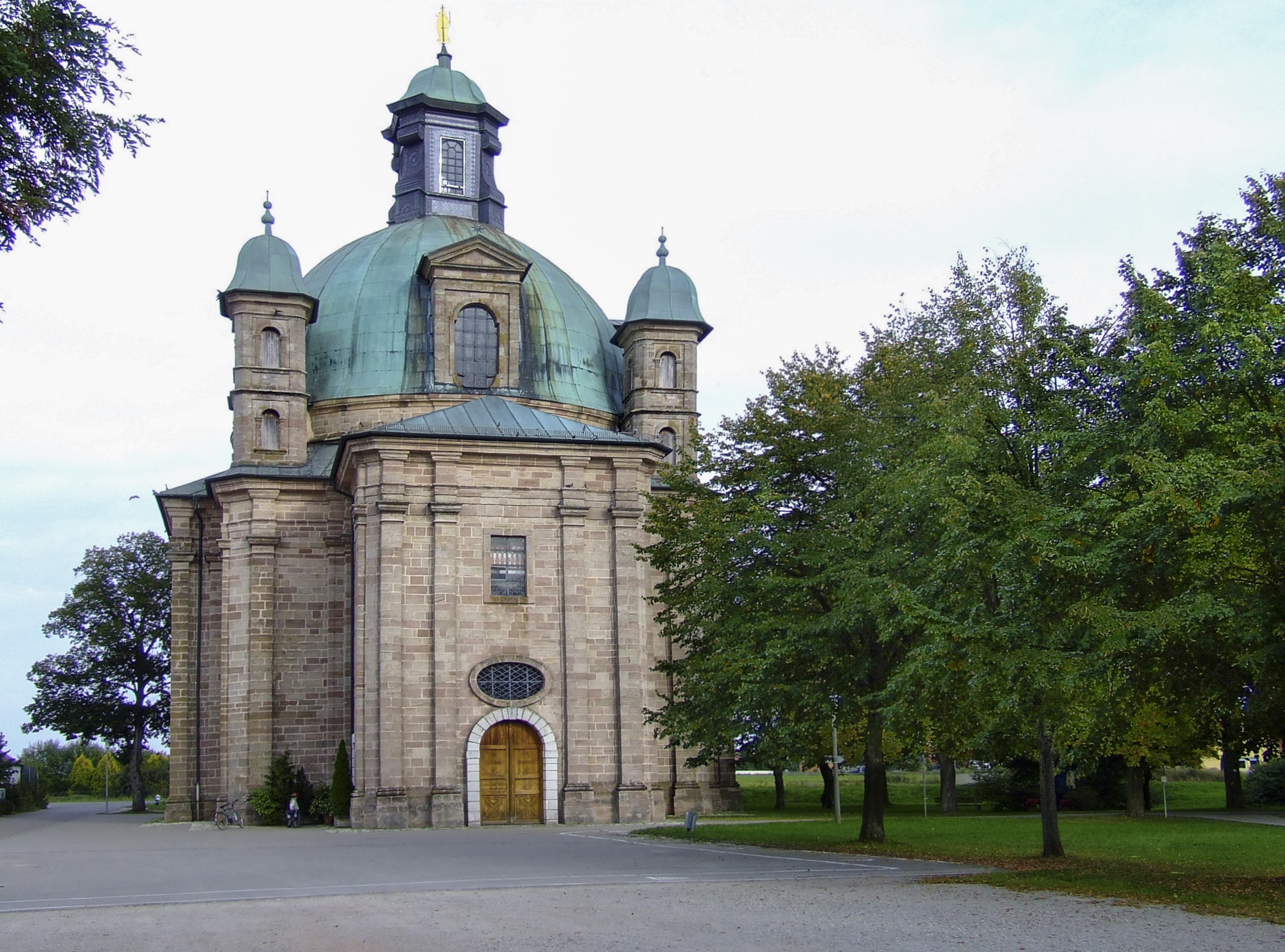
- Church of Our Lady of Help

- Coat of arms

- Location of Freystadt within Neumarkt in der Oberpfalz district
- Interactive map of Freystadt
- Location within Germany Location within Bavaria
- Coordinates: 49°12′N 11°19′E
- Country: Germany
- State: Bavaria
- Admin. region: Oberpfalz
- District: Neumarkt in der Oberpfalz
- Subdivisions: 15 Ortsteile

Government
  - Mayor (2020–26): Alexander Dorr (CSU)

Area
  - Total: 80.56 km^{2} (31.10 sq mi)
- Elevation: 410 m (1,350 ft)

Population (2025-12-31)
  - Total: 9,097
  - Density: 112.9/km^{2} (292.5/sq mi)
- Time zone: UTC+01:00 (CET)
  - Summer (DST): UTC+02:00 (CEST)
- Postal codes: 92342
- Dialling codes: 09179
- Vehicle registration: NM
- Website: freystadt.de

"Freystadt" is also the German names for Kisielice and Kożuchów, Poland.

Freystadt (German pronunciation: [ˈfʁaɪʃtat]; Northern Bavarian: Freystod) is a town in the district of Neumarkt in Bavaria. It is situated near the Rhine-Main-Danube Canal, 14 km southwest of Neumarkt in der Oberpfalz, and 33 km southeast of Nuremberg.

== Sons and daughters of the city ==
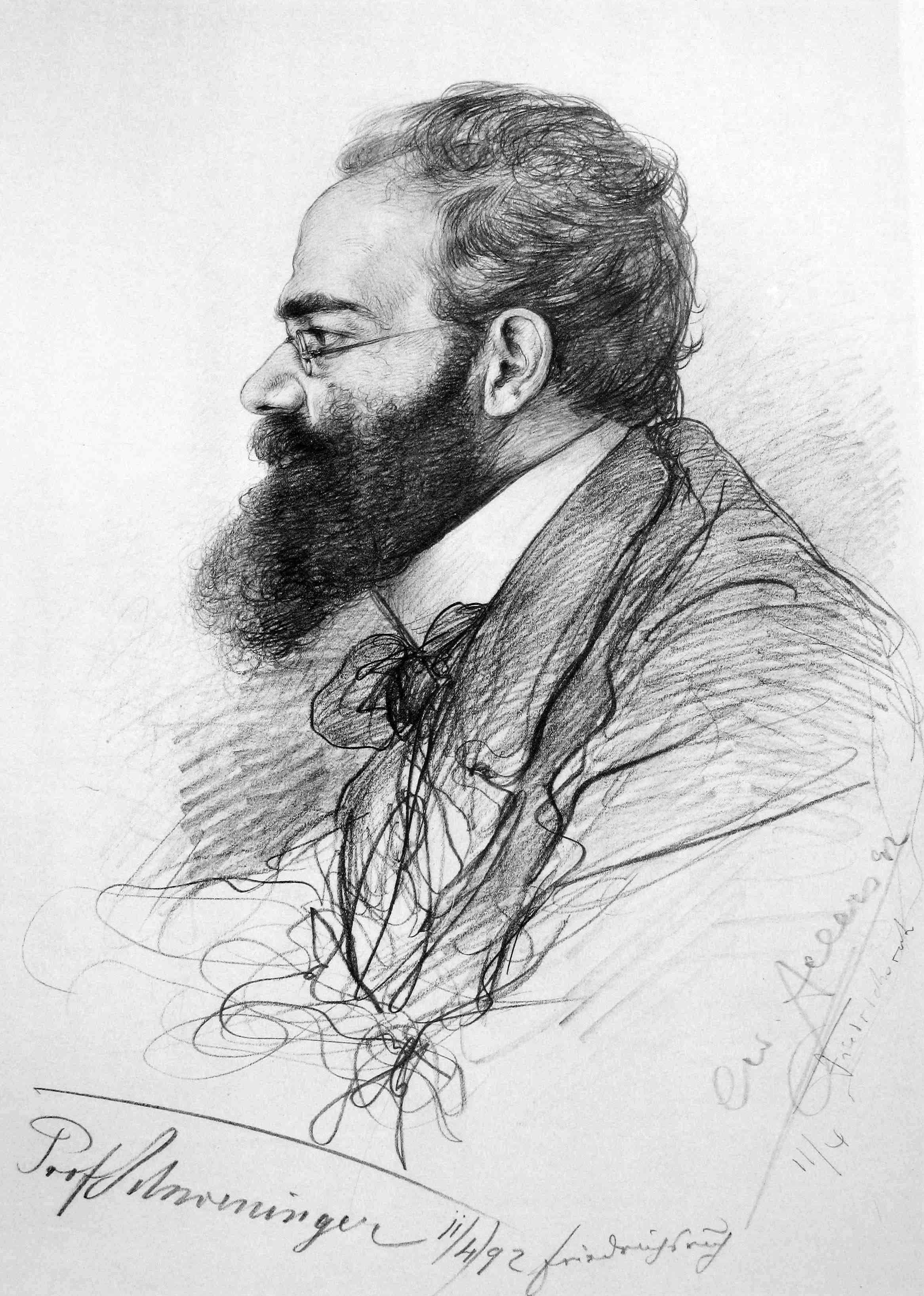
Ernst Schweninger 1892

- Jean Paul Egide Martini (1741-1816), German-French composer
- Ernst Schweninger (1850-1924), German physician and medical historian, physician of Otto von Bismarck.
- Hanna Ludwig (1918–2014), contralto and mezzo-soprano, and academic voice teacher
