= André Doehring =

German musicologist

André Doehring (born in 1973) is a German musicologist, who is active in pop music and jazz research.

== Work ==
Born in Uelzen, Doehring studied musicology and sociology. Since 2005 he worked as a research assistant at the Institute for Musicology and Music Pedagogy at the University of Gießen, where he earned his doctorate in 2010 with a thesis on pop music journalism. After a teaching assignment in Vienna, he was appointed professor for jazz and popular music research at the University of Music and Performing Arts Graz in 2016. There he heads the Institute for Jazz Research. His research interests include topics in popular music, sociomusicology and musical analysis.

He is also on the Scientific Advisory Board of the Gesellschaft für Popularmusikforschung and the International Society for Jazz Research. He is co-editor of samples.de and from 2017 of the two series published in Graz Beiträge zur Jazzforschung / Studies In Jazz Research as well as Jazzforschung / Jazz Research.

== Publications ==
- Musikkommunikatoren: Berufsrollen, Organisationsstrukturen und Handlungsspielräume im Popmusikjournalismus Bielefeld: Transcript Verlag 2011; ISBN 978-3-8376-1898-3
- Ralf von Appen, André Doehring, Dietrich Helms, Allan F. Moore (edits.) Song Interpretation in 21st-Century Pop Music. London, New York: Routledge 2015; ISBN 978-1-4724-2800-4
- Ralf von Appen / André Doehring (edits.) Pop weiter denken: Neue Anstöße aus Jazz Studies, Philosophie, Musiktheorie und Geschichte. Bielefeld: Transcript Verlag 2018; ISBN 978-3-8376-4664-1
- The Shape of Jazz Studies to Come? Überlegungen zu Anforderungen, Inhalten und Zielen der Ausbildung von JazzforscherInnen. In Martin Pfleiderer, Wolf-Georg Zaddach (edit.): Jazzforschung heute. Themen, Methoden, Perspektiven. Berlin: Edition Emvas 2019, p. 235–268
