= Clemens Hellsberg =

Austrian violinist and director of the Vienna Philharmonic (1997–2014)

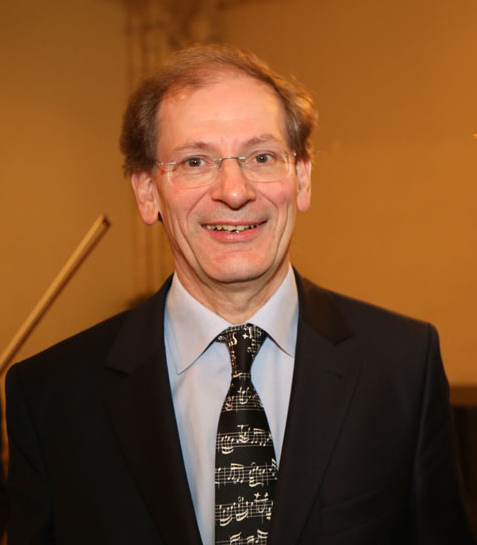
Clemens Hellsberg (2013)

Clemens Hellsberg (born 28 March 1952) is an Austrian violinist and from 1997 to 2014 was director of the Wiener Philharmoniker.

== Life ==
Born in Linz, after attending the Schottengymnasium in Vienna, Hellsberg studied musicology and ancient history at the University of Vienna, where he received his doctorate in 1980. At the same time he studied violin at the University of Music and Performing Arts Vienna. He was a special forces soldier, a member of the Jagdkommando with the Bundesheer. In 1976 he was employed by the orchestra of the Vienna State Opera, and from 1978 played as first violinist in the orchestra of the same opera house. The Philharmonic recorded him in 1980. From 1997 to 2014 he succeeded Werner Resel on the board of directors. In September 2014, Andreas Großbauer succeeded him in this function. In 2016 he went into retirement.

Hellsberg also gained fame through his book Democracy of the Kings, published in 1992. The Austrian Green party published this history of the Vienna Philharmonic because of what they saw as omissions, from the official narrative, of elements of Nazism in the past of the Vienna Philharmonic.

He has been a member of the Catholic student fraternity KÖStV Rudolfina Wien of the Österreichischer Cartellverband since 1974.

== Publications ==
- 1992: Demokratie der Könige: Die Geschichte der Wiener Philharmoniker. Musikverlag Schott, Mainz 1992, ISBN 978-3795702366
- 2015: Philharmonische Begegnungen 1: Die Welt der Wiener Philharmoniker als Mosaik. Braumüller Verlag, Vienna 2015, ISBN 978-3-99100-161-4
- 2016: Philharmonische Begegnungen 2: Die Welt der Wiener Philharmoniker als Mosaik. Braumüller Verlag, Vienna 2016, ISBN 978-3-99100-188-1

== Honours ==
- 1999: Komtur des Order of St. Gregory the Great.
- 2002: Berufstitel Professor
- 2011: Ehrenzeichen des Landes Salzburg.
- 2012: Marietta and Friedrich Torberg Medal of the Israelitische Kultusgemeinde Wien.
- 2013: Goldenes Ehrenzeichen für Verdienste um das Land Wien.
- 2014: Order of the Rising Sun.
- 2014: Order pro Merito Melitensi.
- 2015: Chevalier de l'Ordre des Arts et des Lettres.
