= Elisabeth Höngen =

German opera singer (1906–1997)

- Höngen, in c. 1940
- Born: 7 December 1906; Gevelsberg, Germany
- Died: 7 August 1997 (aged 90); Vienna, Austria
- Education: University of Berlin
- Occupations: Operatic mezzo-soprano; Academic teacher
- Organizations: Vienna State Opera; Wiener Musikakademie
- Awards: Mozart Medal

Elisabeth Höngen (7 December 1906 – 7 August 1997) was a German operatic mezzo-soprano and singing-actress. She was particularly associated with Wagner and Strauss roles, and with Verdi's Lady Macbeth. From 1947 onward she was one of the Vienna State Opera's most prominent artists for nearly 30 years.

== Career ==
Höngen was born on 7 December 1906 in Gevelsberg. She publicly performed as a violinist at age 15. She studied German and music at the University of Berlin and the Berlin State School of Music. Her voice teacher was Hermann Weißenborn in Berlin, the same teacher who trained Marga Höffgen's voice 15 years later. In 1933, Höngen made her debut at the Stadttheater Wuppertal. From 1935–1940 she sang at the Düsseldorf Opera including two guest performances in the Netherlands in 1934 and 1938. In 1937, she participated in the world premiere of the opera Magnus Fahlander by Fritz von Borries. From 1940 until 1943 she was a member of the Dresden opera. In 1943, she was invited to the Vienna State Opera where she stayed until her retirement.

In 1947 and 1959–60 Höngen performed at La Scala in Milan, the Royal Opera House in London, the Teatro Colón in Buenos Aires, the Grand Opéra in Paris, in Amsterdam, Zürich, Berlin und Munich. From 1951–52 she worked at the Metropolitan Opera in New York. She sang at the Edinburgh Festival, and performed as both Fricka and Waltraute in Wagner Der Ring des Nibelungen at the Bayreuth Festival in 1951, as well as the Maggio Musicale Fiorentino in Florence.

In 1957, she accepted a position as a professor at the Wiener Musikakademie while at the same time continuing her stage career. In 1965, she performed in Vienna, and at the Salzburger Festspiele. She left the Vienna State Opera in 1971.

Höngen died in Vienna on 7 August 1997 at the age of 90.

== Performances and roles ==
Höngen appeared at the Salzburg Festival and the Bayreuth Festival, quickly establishing herself in Wagner roles such as Venus in Tannhäuser, Ortrud in Lohengrin, Fricka in Die Walküre, Erda in Siegfried, Waltraute in Götterdämmerung, and Strauss roles such as Herodias in Salome, Klytemnestra in Elektra, Nurse in Die Frau ohne Schatten, and Clairon in Capriccio. She won considerable acclaim as Verdi Lady Macbeth, Eboli in Don Carlos, Amneris in Aida, and as Bizet's Carmen. She also performed the title role of Britten's The Rape of Lucretia, and Baba the Turk in Stravinsky's The Rake's Progress.

She made guest appearances at the Munich State Opera, the Royal Opera House in London, the Paris Opéra, La Scala in Milan, the Teatro Colón in Buenos Aires, and the Metropolitan Opera in New York.

== Recognition ==
Conductor Karl Böhm called her "the world's greatest tragedienne".

In 1964 she was awarded the Mozartmedaille by the Mozart community of Vienna.

Her voice has been described as "rich, beautifully formed, with dramatic delivery and strength and feeling for style exciting admiration" ("Umfangreiche, schön gebildete Stimme, deren dramatische Ausdruckskraft und deren Stilgefühl Bewunderung erregten").

== Recordings ==
- 1943 – Macbeth – Mathieu Ahlersmeyer, Elisabeth Höngen, Josef Witt, Herbert Alsen – Vienna State Opera Chorus and Orchestra, Karl Böhm – Cantus Classic (sung in German)
- 1954 – Johannes Brahms, Alto Rhapsody, Ferdinand Leitner conducting the Berlin Philharmonic Orchestra (DGG 16105 LP)
- Electrola (9th Symphony by L.v. Beethoven), Philips
- DGG (Elektra, Lied cycle Frauenliebe und –leben by R. Schumann)
- Columbia (Lieder), Seraphim (Hänsel und Gretel), UORC (Frau ohne Schatten by R. Strauss)
- Urania (Macbeth by Verdi)
- Decca (Frau ohne Schatten)
- Bruno Walter Society (complete Der Ring des Nibelungen)
- Murray Hill (Erda in Siegfried, Fricka in Rheingold and Walküre), (Marcellina in Le Nozze di Figaro),
- Cetra Opera Live (Aida)
- Rococo (Elektra in the role of Klytämnestra)
- Melodram (F minor Mass by Bruckner, Verdi’s Requiem)
