= Hermin Esser =

German operatic tenor

- Esser as Erik in Der fliegende Holländer
- Born: 1 April 1928; Rheydt, Germany
- Died: 17 April 2009 (aged 81); Wiesbaden, Hesse, Germany
- Education: Robert-Schumann-Konservatorium
- Occupation: Operatic tenor
- Organizations: Komische Oper Berlin; Hessisches Staatstheater Wiesbaden; Bayreuth Festival

Hermin Esser (1 April 1928 – 17 April 2009) was a German operatic tenor who focused on roles by Richard Wagner, which he performed at the Bayreuth Festival and internationally.

== Career ==
Born in Rheydt to a musical family, Esser was first a graphic designer and then began to study architecture. He studied voice at the Robert-Schumann-Konservatorium in Düsseldorf with Franziska Martienssen-Lohmann. He made his debut at the Stadttheater Krefeld in 1954 and moved via Gelsenkirchen as a lyrical tenor to the Komische Oper Berlin in 1957, where he worked with Walter Felsenstein.

When the Berlin Wall was built, he moved to the Hessisches Staatstheater Wiesbaden. His broad repertoire included Mozart's Die Zauberflöte, Radames in Verdi's Aida, Rodolfo in Puccini's La Bohème, operas by Janáček (Jenůfa, Káťa Kabanová and Aus einem Totenhaus), Alban Berg's Wozzeck and Aribert Reimann's Lear. He focused on stage works by Richard Wagner, which he also performed as a guest internationally.

Esser first sang at the Bayreuth Festival in 1966, on an invitation by Wieland Wagner, as Froh in Das Rheingold. In 1967, he appeared as Walther von der Vogelweide in Tannhäuser. In Die Meistersinger von Nürnberg, he was David from 1967 to 1970 and Walther von Stolzing in 1975. He appeared as Erik in Der fliegende Holländer in 1970, 1971 and 1979. He sang the title role of Tannhäuser in 1972, 1974 and 1977. The last role in Bayreuth, of 14 roles in eight stage works, was Tristan in 1981.

Esser performed as a guest at major European opera houses, including the Vienna State Opera, where he appeared as Tristan in Wagner's Tristan und Isolde, Siegfried in Der Ring des Nibelungen, and in the title role of Parsifal. He performed at the Hungarian State Opera House, the Grand Theatre in Warsaw, the Croatian National Theatre in Zagreb, and the Opernhaus Zürich, among others. In 1988, he appeared at the Staatsoper Dresden as Herod in Salome by Richard Strauss.

Esser died in Wiesbaden on 17 April 2009.
