= Fritz Spindler =

German pianist and composer

Fritz Spindler.

Fritz Spindler (24 November 1817 – 26 December 1905) was a German pianist and composer, especially of works for the piano.

== Biographical sketch ==
Born in Wurzbach, Spindler's output of more than 400 opus numbers includes salon pieces, chamber music, symphonies and other large forms, and over 300 piano pieces. But he is best remembered, if at all today, for a much-anthologized sonatina. He published almost 350 compositions.

He died in Niederlößnitz/Radebeul, near Dresden.

== Publications ==
- Berthold Tours, Fritz Spindler: Novello, Ewer and Co.'s Pianoforte Albums. Nos. 17, 18, and 19. Compositions by Fritz Spindler, in: The Musical Times and Singing Class Circular, vol. 27, no. 524 (1 Oct. 1886), p. 611
- Otto Wagner: "Das rumanische Volkslied", in: Sammelbände der Internationalen Musikgesellschaft, vol. 4, no. 1. (November 1902), pp. 164–169.
