= Wolfgang Wengenroth =

German conductor

Wolfgang Wengenroth (born 15 November 1975 in Bonn, Germany) is a German conductor.

== Biography ==
Wolfgang Wengenroth studied piano and conducting at the University of Music and Performing Arts in Graz, Austria, as well as at the University of Music Saar in Saarbrücken, Germany. He graduated in the year 2000. In 2002 he started working as solo-repetiteur at the Komische Oper in Berlin. Two years later the general music director at the time, Kirill Petrenko, appointed him his assistant and director of studies. From 2006 to 2016, Wengenroth worked as Kapellmeister at the Theater for Lower Saxony Hildesheim-Hanover, at the Hessian State Theater Wiesbaden as well as at the Mannheim National Theatre. In 2013 Kirill Petrenko engaged him again. This time as his assistant for the Ring der Nibelungen performances in the anniversary year of the Bayreuth Festival. Since 2016, Wengenroth has been working as an artistic freelancer. Guest appearances led him to engagements e.g., at the Berlin State Opera, the Ruhrtriennale, the Bremen Theater, at the Oldenburg and Baden State Theater Karlsruhe, to performances with the Bern Symphony Orchestra, the Bremen Philharmonic, the Carinthian Symphony Orchestra, the Northwest German Philharmonic, at the Teatro Colón, Buenos Aires, with the Shizuoka Symphony Orchestra, South Korea, the Gewandhaus Orchestra and the Leipzig Opera. He regularly conducts at Scandinavian houses, including the operas in Copenhagen, Stockholm, Gothenburg and Malmö, where he enjoyed great success with A Midsummer Night's Dream in October/November 2021. Wolfgang Wengenroth is committed to young musicians worldwide. In 2022, trips took him to Iran, among other places, for workshops with young musicians and concerts with the Tehran Symphony Orchestra. He then worked with youth orchestras in Bolivia and Argentina and gave master classes in Santa Cruz de la Sierra and Buenos Aires. He also returned to Santa Fe for a concert and made his debut at the Teatro del Bicentenario in San Juan, Argentina. Wolfgang Wengenroth has a vast opera, ballet and concert repertoire and has a great interest in new music. He conducted e.g., works by Alban Berg, Olivier Messiaen, Erwin Schulhoff, Igor Stravinsky, Edgar Varèse and Kurt Weill.

== Teaching ==
During his permanent positions, Wengenroth took on teaching assignments for accompaniment, study of parts, direction of the wind orchestra or choir studies at the University of Graz, the UdK Berlin, the University of Applied Sciences in Hanover and the Wiesbaden Music Academy. In 2016 he was appointed professor at the University of Music and Performing Arts in Graz.
