= Klaus Lang =

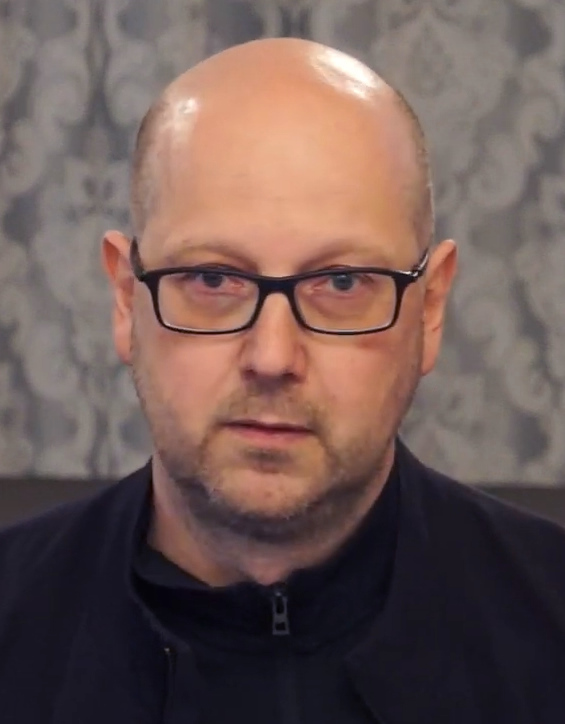
- Lang in 2019
- Born: 26 April 1971 (age 55); Graz
- Occupations: Composer; Concert organist; Improviser; Academic teacher.
- Organization: University of Music and Performing Arts, Graz
- Awards: Andrzej-Dobrowolski-Preis

Klaus Lang (born 26 April 1971 in Graz) is an Austrian composer, concert organist, improviser, and academic teacher.

His opera Die Architektur des Regens (The Architecture of Rain) after the Noh play Shiga by Zeami was premiered at the Munich Biennale in 2008.

In 2006, Lang was appointed Professor of composition at the University of Music and Performing Arts, Graz. In 2010 he was awarded the Andrzej-Dobrowolski-Preis of the Steiermark.

He was commissioned by Katharina Wagner to write an opera, The Vanished Wedding, to be premiered at Bayreuth, although not at the Festspielhaus and not part of the Bayreuth Festival. It is claimed to be the first world premiere at Bayreuth since the premiere of Wagner's Parsifal in 1882. The Vanished Wedding was premiered at the Reichshof, a disused Bayreuth cinema, on 23 July 2018, the day before the start of the 2018 Bayreuth Festival.
