= Mozart Medal (Mozartgemeinde) =

Austrian music award

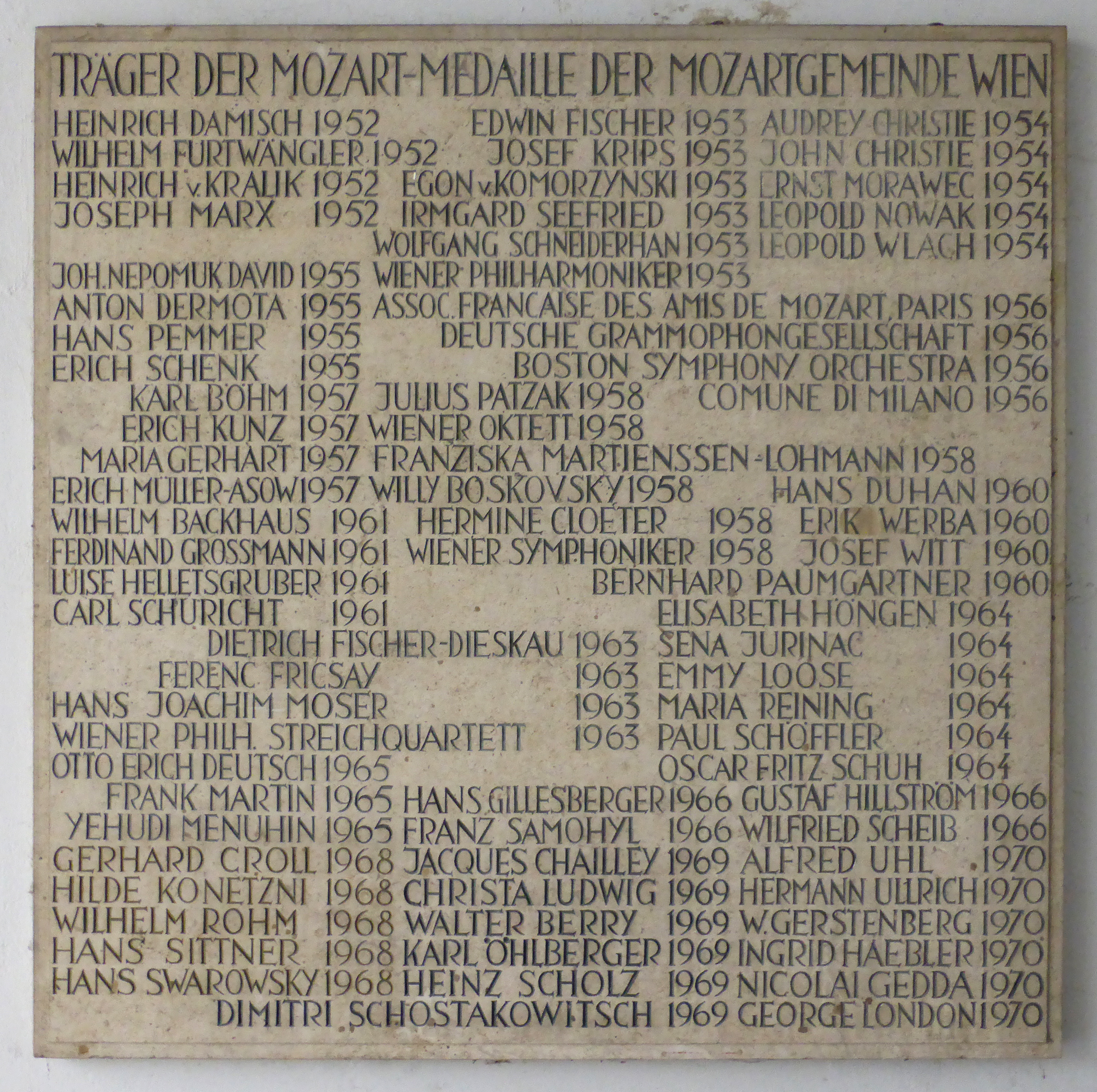
Mozartgemeinde Wien – Recipients of the Mozart Medal – Deutschordenshof

The Mozart Medal of the Mozartgemeinde Wien was a music award named after Wolfgang Amadeus Mozart.

== Recipients ==
- Heinrich Damisch, 1952
- Wilhelm Furtwängler, 1952
- Heinrich von Kralik, 1952
- Joseph Marx, 1952
- Edwin Fischer, 1953
- Egon von Komorzynsky, 1953
- Irmgard Seefried, 1953
- Wiener Philharmoniker, 1953
- Audrey Christie, 1954
- John Christie, 1954
- Ernst Moravec, 1954
- Leopold Nowak, 1954
- Leopold Wlach, 1954
- Johann Nepomuk David, 1955
- Anton Dermota, 1955
- Hans Pemmer, 1955
- Erich Schenk, 1955
- Amis de Mozart Paris, 1956
- Boston Symphony Orchestra, 1956
- Comune di Milano, 1956
- Deutsche Grammophon Gesellschaft, 1956
- Karl Böhm, 1957
- Maria Gerhart, 1957
- Erich Kunz, 1957
- Erich Müller-Asow, 1957
- Willy Boskovsky, 1958
- Franziska Martienssen-Lohmann, 1958
- Julius Patzak, 1958
- Wiener Oktett, 1958
- Wiener Symphoniker, 1958
- Hans Duhan, 1960
- Bernhard Paumgartner, 1960
- Erik Werba, 1960
- Josef Witt, 1960
- Wilhelm Backhaus, 1961
- Ferdinand Grossmann, 1961
- Wise Helletsgruber, 1961
- Carl Schuricht, 1961
- Dietrich Fischer-Dieskau, 1963
- Ferenc Fricsay, 1963
- Hans Joachim Moser, 1963
- Wiener Phil. Streichquartett, 1963
- Elisabeth Höngen, 1964
- Sena Jurinac, 1964
- Emmy Loose, 1964
- Maria Reining, 1964
- Paul Schöffler, 1964
- Oscar Fritz Schuh, 1964
- Otto Erich Deutsch, 1965
- Frank Martin, 1965
- Yehudi Menuhin, 1965
- Gustav Hillström, 1966
- Wilfried Scheib, 1966
- Franz Samohyl, 1966
- Gerhard Croll, 1968
- Hilde Konetzni, 1968
- Wilhelm Rohm, 1968
- Hans Sittner, 1968
- Hans Swarowsky, 1968
- Christa Ludwig, 1969
- Jacques Chailley, 1969
- Karl Öhlberger, 1969
- Walter Berry, 1969
- Heinz Scholz, 1969
- Dmitri Shostakovich, 1969
- Nicolai Gedda, 1970
- Walter Gerstenberg, 1970
- Ingrid Haebler, 1970
- Egon von Komorzynsky, 1970
- George London, 1970
- Alfred Uhl, 1970
- Erich Marckhl, 1971
- Manuel Capdevila, 1971
- Norbert Sprongl, 1971
- Henryk Szeryng, 1971
- Erich Valentin, 1971
- Claudio Abbado, 1973
- Friedrich Gehmacher, 1973
- Alexander Weinmann, 1973
- Fritz Heindl, 1974
- Walter Senn, 1974
- Otto Strasser, 1974
- Hans Zwölfer, 1974
- Amadeus Quartet, 1975
- Karl Pfannhauser, 1975
- Keisei Sakka, 1975

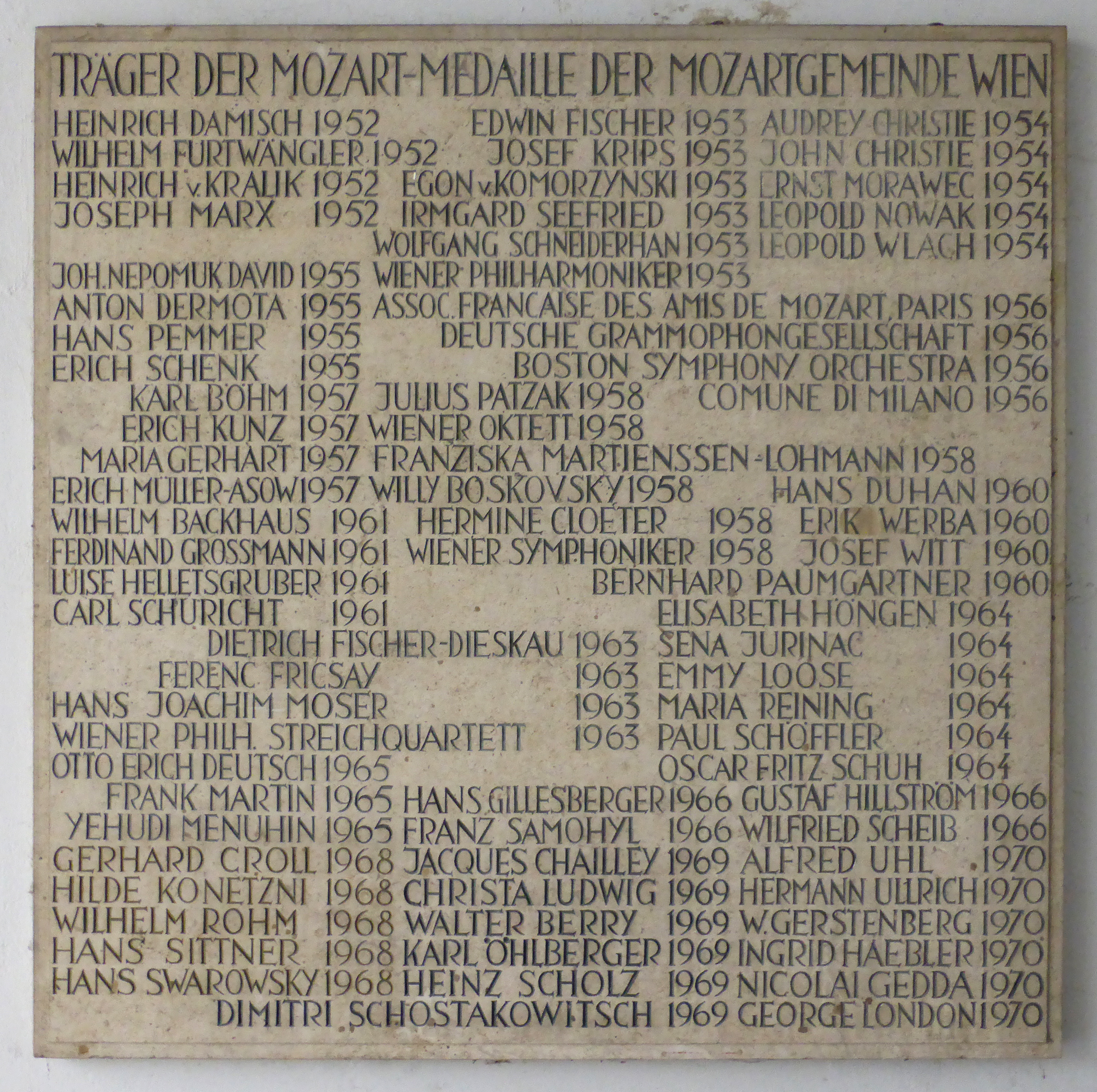
Recipients Mozart Medal – Deutschordenshof, Vienna

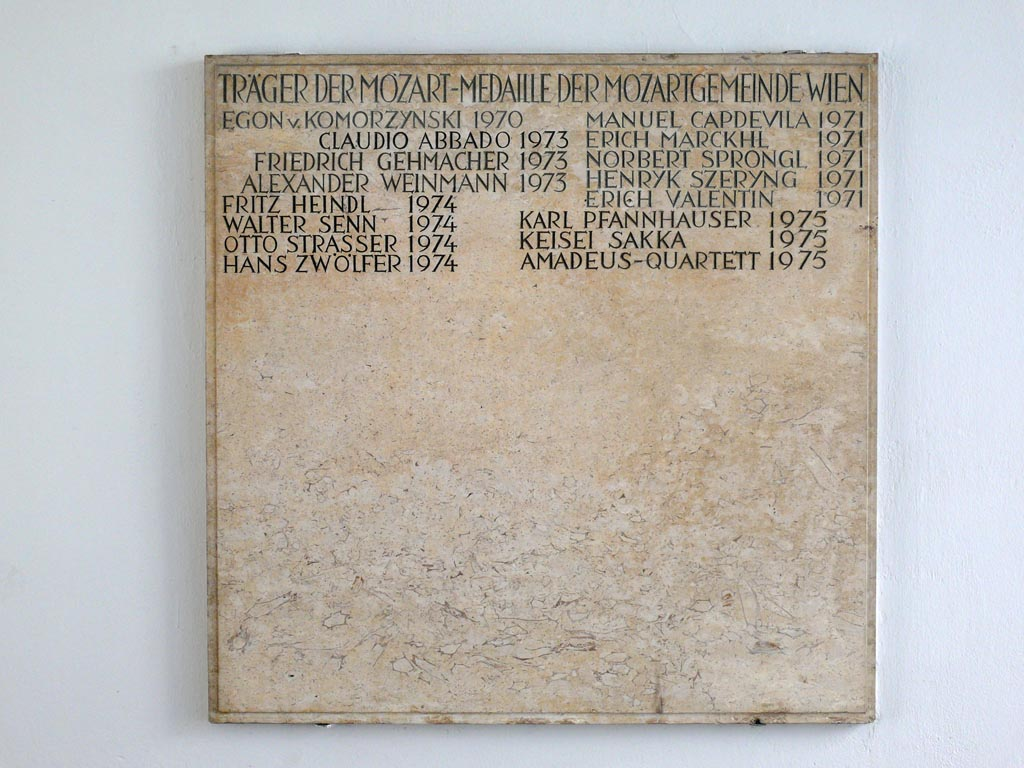
Recipients Mozart Medal II – Deutschordenshof, Vienna
