= Violin Sonata No. 36 (Mozart) =

- Für Anfänger
- by W. A. Mozart
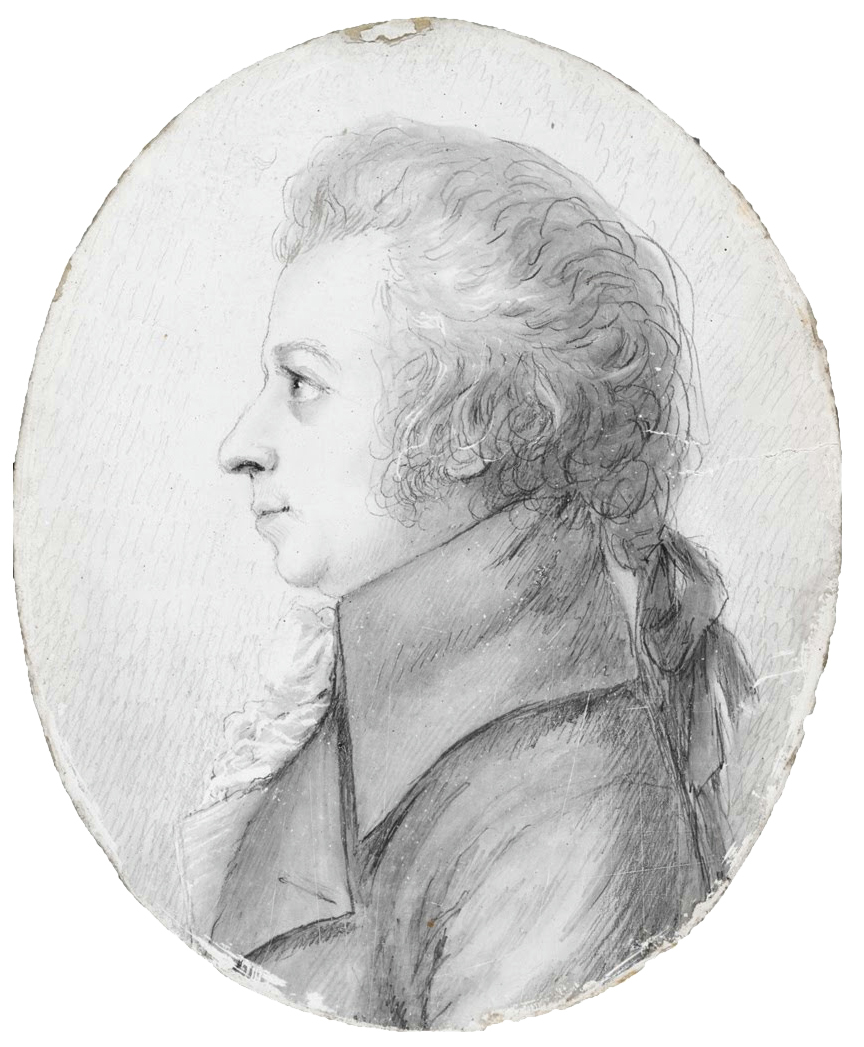
- Doris Stock's 1789 miniature of Mozart
- Key: F major
- Catalogue: K. 547
- Composed: Vienna, 1788
- Duration: c. 20 minutes
- Movements: 3
- Scoring: Violin and piano

The Sonata in F for Violin and Keyboard, K. 547, was completed in Vienna on July 10, 1788 by Wolfgang Amadeus Mozart. The sonata is often nicknamed "Für Anfänger" (For Beginners) and was completed two weeks after the similarly nicknamed piano sonata in C major, K. 545. Unlike the previous few keyboard sonatas, where the violin played an equal role, this sonata is dominated by the keyboard part. In that regard, only the violin part is easy and the keyboard part is not "for beginners".

There are three movements all in the tonic key of F major:

1. Andante cantabile
2. Allegro
3. Andante con variazioni

The movements are ordered in a non-standard manner with the "slow" movement first and the expansive Allegro in sonata form placed second. There is significant dialogue between the violin and keyboard in the opening movement, but the keyboard dominates the latter two. The sonata ends with a set of six variations on a simple theme. The fourth variation is the only variation to feature the violin prominently and the fifth variation is in F minor for keyboard alone.

The second movement was arranged for solo piano along with a transcription of the finale of the piano sonata in C, K. 545 to form the Piano Sonata in F major, K. 547a.
