= Joseph Breinl =

German musician

Joseph Breinl (born 5 November 1974 in Munich, Germany) is a German pianist and accompanist.

== Education ==
Awarded a scholarship by the renowned Studienstiftung des Deutschen Volkes, Joseph Breinl studied solo piano in Munich with Karl-Hermann Mrongovius and Gitti Pirner. After graduation in Munich, Breinl continued his studies at the Conservatorium van Amsterdam working on solo piano, song accompaniment and Cembalo with Willem Brons, Rudolf Jansen and Therese de Goede. Breinl also worked closely with Udo Reinemann and Graham Johnson, who have both remained important musical influences in his career.

Joseph Breinl earned a degree in economics from the FernUniversität Hagen in the fall of 2024. His academic focus was on monetary theory and monetary policy in economics, as well as on controlling, organization, and management theory (business administration).

== Venues ==
He performed at the Munich Opera Festival, the Klavier-Festival Ruhr, the Beethovenfest Bonn, the Schubertiade Vorarlberg, the Delft Chamber Music Festival and the Schleswig-Holstein Musik Festival.

Venues in Europe include the National Theatre Munich, the Concertgebouw Amsterdam, Wigmore Hall London, the Mozarteum concert hall Salzburg, the Théâtre des Champs-Élysées and Salle Pleyel in Paris, the Musikverein Vienna, the Stockholm Concert Hall, the Festspielhaus Baden-Baden, the La Monnaie Bruxelles, La Scala in Milan and the Palais des Beaux Arts in Brussels.

In the United States, Breinl performed at New York's Carnegie Hall in 2006 and 2010, Washington D.C.'s Kennedy Center in 2010 and at many other venues.

In Japan, he gave concerts at Suntory Hall and Tokyo Bunka Kaikan in Tokyo and Festival Hall, Osaka.

== Accompanist ==
Breinl regularly works with Dutch mezzo-soprano Christianne Stotijn. Besides, he has performed with artists including Waltraud Meier, Michelle Breedt, Audun Iversen, Miah Persson, Udo Reinemann and Sylvia Schwartz.

He also accompanied renowned instrumentalists including Liza Ferschtman, Antoine Tamestit, Carolin Widmann, Tabea Zimmermann and gives classes around the world.

== Trivia ==
Invited by German chancellor Angela Merkel, Waltraud Meier and Joseph Breinl performed songs of Richard Strauss at the 41st G7 summit 2015 in Germany.

== Professorship ==
Since 2010, Joseph Breinl has been professor of song accompaniment at the university of music and performing arts in Graz, Austria.
