= Ľuboš Šrámek =

Slovak composer, jazz pianist, teacher and music producer (born 1977)

Ľubomír Šrámek (born 24 June, 1977), professionally known as Ľuboš Šrámek (also Luboš Šrámek) is a Slovak composer, jazz pianist, teacher and music producer.

Šrámek educated at the Bratislava Conservatory (piano, from 1993 to 1999) and in the University of Music and Performing Arts Graz, Graz, Austria (jazz studies, from 1999 to 2003).

== Awards ==
- 2015: Radio Head Awards: Record of the Year in the Jazz Music category (Ľuboš Šrámek & His EEArtsemble ft. Peter Erskine - White Dream)
- 2019: Main Esprit Award for the best Slovak jazz album ( Perforomances, with nanoSymphonic Artsemble)
- 2022: Radio Head Awards: Record of the Year in the Jazz Music category (Nikitin, Šrámek, Altar Ensemble — Directions & Connections)
