= Piano Sonata in B-flat major, K. 498a =

1798 work purportedly composed by Mozart or Muller

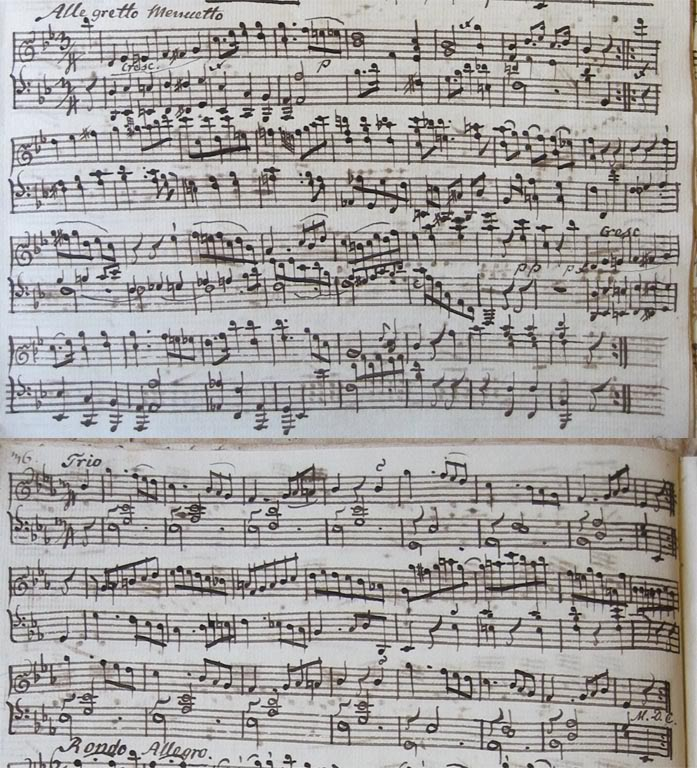
The Menuetto and Trio from this sonata

The Piano Sonata in B♭ major, K. 498a (Anh. 136), is a piano sonata in four movements. It was first printed in 1798 by P. J. Thonus in Leipzig on behalf of Breitkopf & Härtel and attributed to Wolfgang Amadeus Mozart; an edition printed in c. 1805 already credited it as opus 26 of the Thomascantor August Eberhard Müller (1767–1817). Some publications still attribute it to Mozart, often as Piano Sonata No. 20.

== Form ==
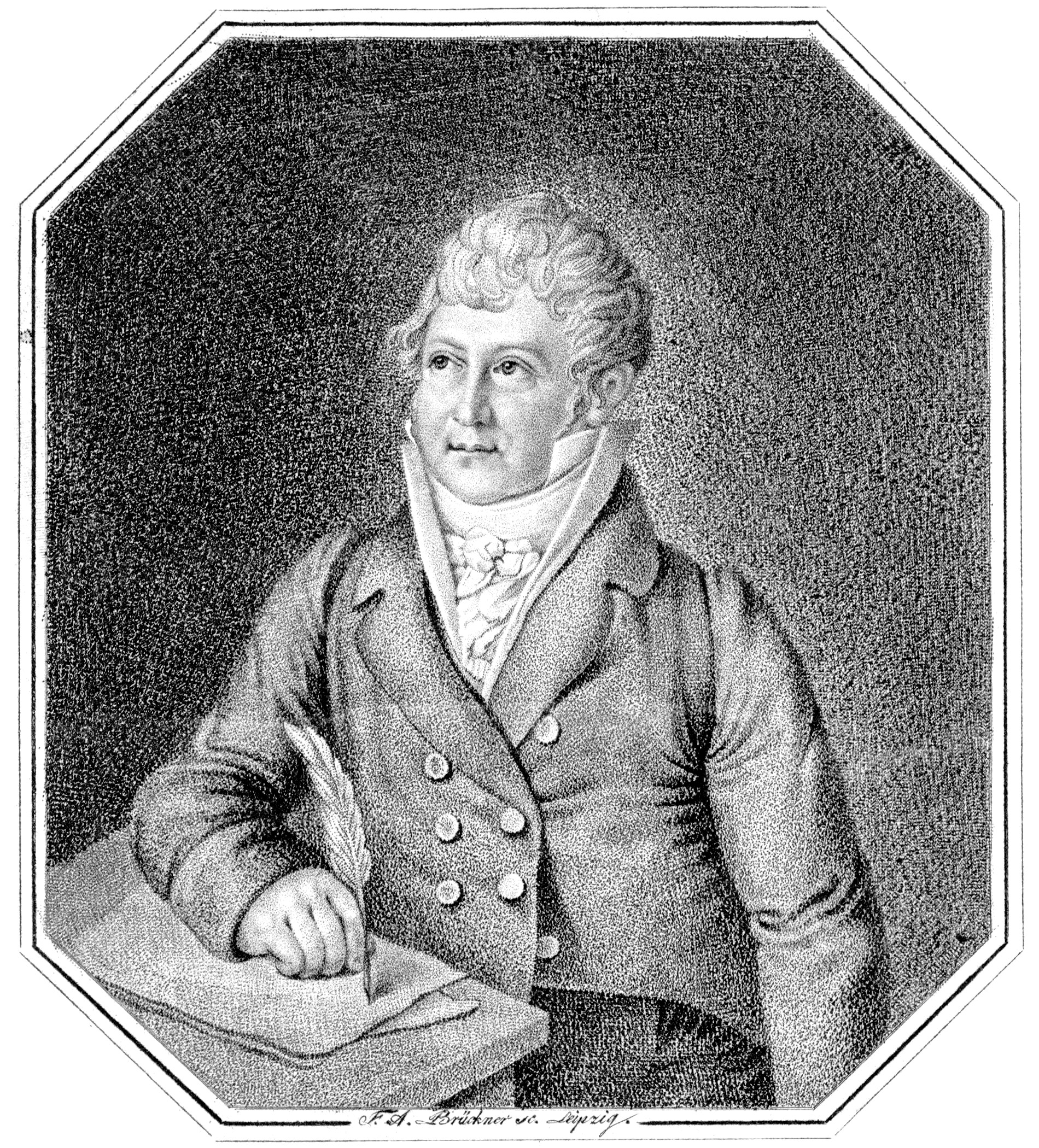
August Eberhard Müller

A typical performance lasts for about 19 minutes. The movements are:

1. Allegro (in B♭ major, common time, 132 bars)
2. Andante (in E♭ major, 3/8 time, 67 bars)
3. Menuetto
  Allegro (in B♭ major, 3/4 time, 35 bars)
  Trio (in E♭ major, 3/4 time, 24 bars)
4. Rondo – Allegro (B♭ major, 6/8 time, 235 bars)

The musicologist Alfred Einstein suggested that the Menuetto from this work might be a piano arrangement of the "missing movement" of Mozart's Eine kleine Nachtmusik, K. 525 (1787).

The Andante is an arrangement of the variations movement of the concerto K. 450 in B♭ major, and the Rondo incorporates arrangements of passages from the finales of the B♭ concerti K. 450, K. 456, and K. 595.

== Recordings ==
- Vincenzo Balzani: Pagine rare per pianoforte / Wolfgango Amadeo Mozart (1980), Ducale CD 349/350
- Transcription for chamber string orchestra recorded by the Hanover Band, Nimbus CD NI5228

== See also ==
- Piano Sonata in F major, K. 547a (Mozart)
