= Sonatina in F major (attributed to Beethoven) =

Musical composition attributed to Ludwig van Beethoven

The Sonatina in F major is a composition for solo piano in two movements, attributed to Ludwig van Beethoven (listed as Anh. 5 No. 2 in the Kinsky–Halm Catalogue)

== Structure ==
The composition is in two movements:

1. Allegro assai
2. Rondo: Allegro

Both movements are in 2/4 time. Most of the first movement is in sixteenth notes and the second movement is in eighth notes.
