= Sonatina in G major (attributed to Beethoven) =

Musical composition

The Sonatina in G major is a composition for solo piano attributed to Ludwig van Beethoven (listed as Anh. 5 No. 1 in the Kinsky–Halm Catalogue). The work was published in Hamburg, Germany, after Beethoven's death.

== Structure ==
The composition is in two movements:

1. Moderato
2. Romance

The first movement is in 4/4 time; the second movement is titled Romance and is in 6/8 time.

== Authorship ==
Modern scholars now consider Beethoven's authorship of the work unlikely. There is no proof that Beethoven himself composed the work; however, it was found amongst his papers after he died. Some people believe it was written by one of his pupils.
