= Piano Sonata in F major, K. 547a =

Piano Sonata K. 547a

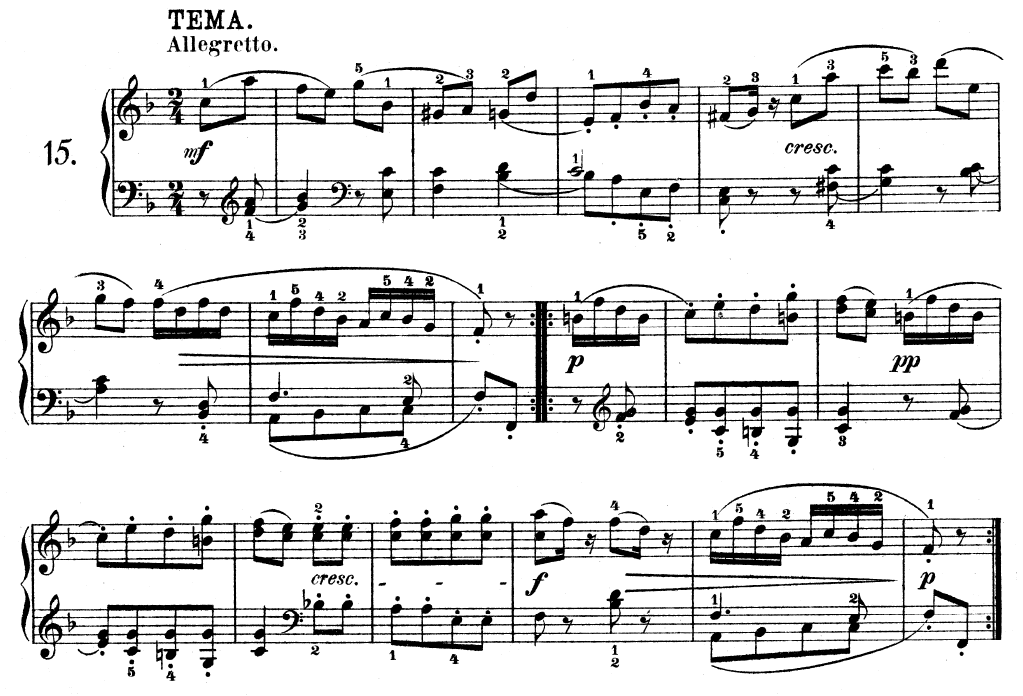
Theme from the variations, K. 54/547b, sometimes played as an additional third movement to this piece. This score has many additional editorial markings not written by Mozart himself.

Wolfgang Amadeus Mozart's Piano Sonata in F major, K. 547a (Anh. 135) is a sonata in two movements. It was originally published as an original sonata by Breitkopf and Härtel in 1799 but was soon found to be an amalgam of movements culled from other compositions. It is sometimes called Mozart's Piano Sonata No. 19.

== Movements ==
The work has two movements:

1. Allegro (a solo-piano transcription of the second movement of the violin sonata, K. 547)
2. Allegretto (a transposition of the finale to the C major "Sonata Facile" into F major)

The set of six keyboard variations on an original Andante, KV 54/547b/Anh.138a are sometimes played as an additional third movement to this piece. These variations are themselves also transcribed from the same violin sonata (K. 547) as the Allegro with its fourth variation (which was violin-centric in the original) re-written.

== See also ==
- Piano Sonata in B-flat major, K. 498a (Mozart)
