= Oberschützen =

- Municipality
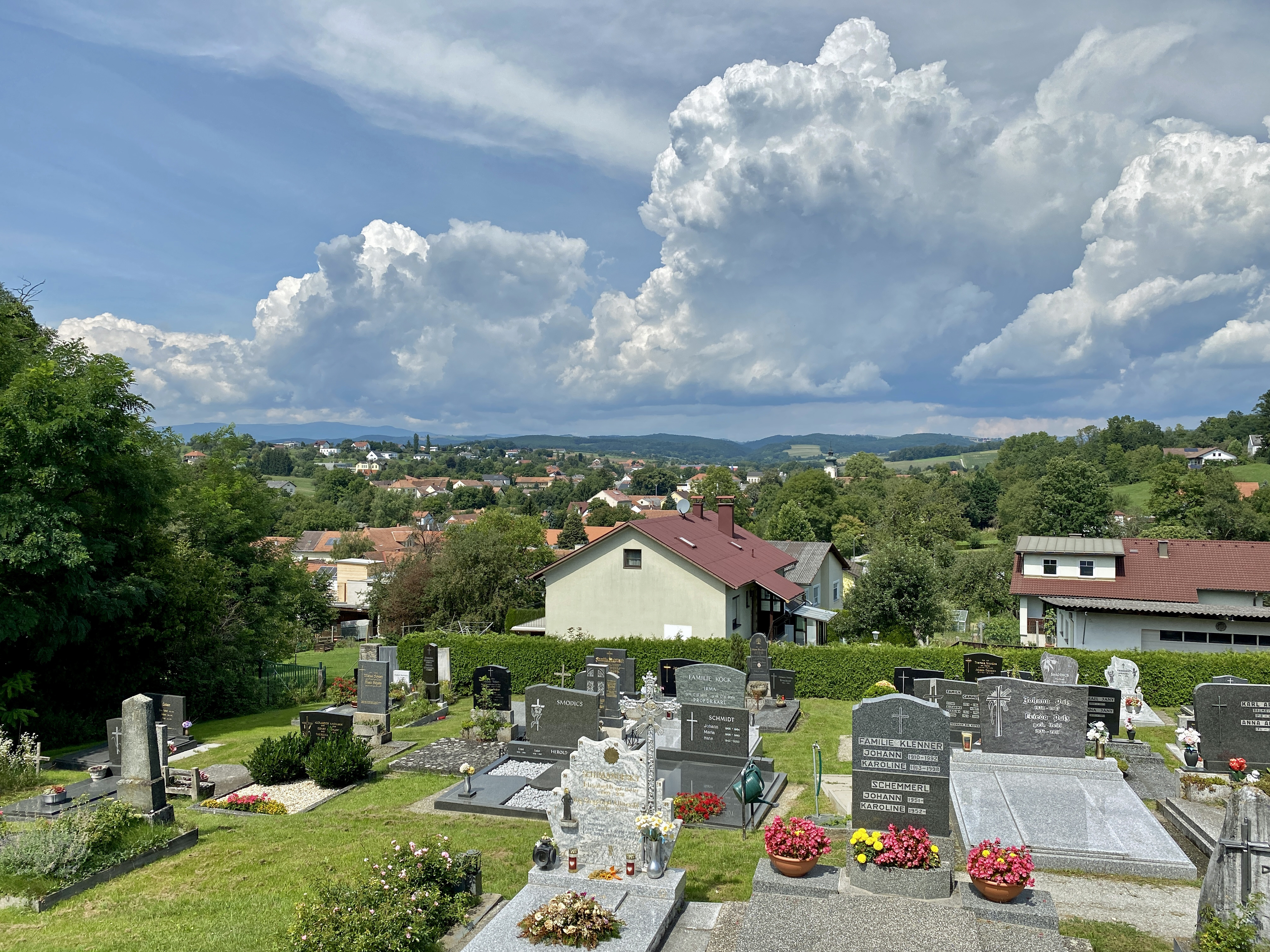
- View of Oberschützen

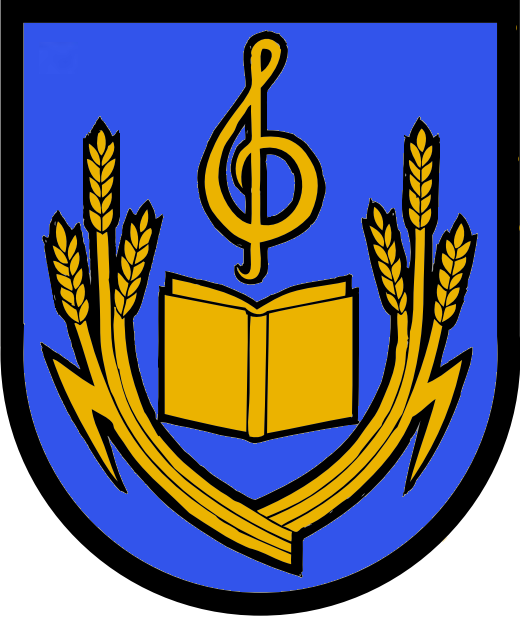
- Coat of arms

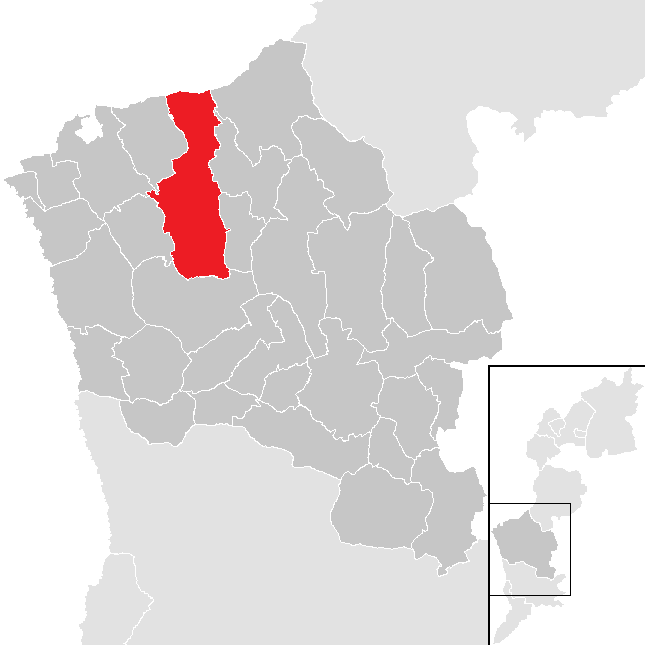
- Location within Oberwart district

- Location within Austria
- Coordinates: 47°21′N 16°13′E
- Country: Austria
- State: Burgenland
- District: Oberwart

Government
  - Mayor: Hans Unger

Area
  - Total: 44.39 km^{2} (17.14 sq mi)
- Elevation: 355 m (1,165 ft)

Population (2018-01-01)
  - Total: 2,429
  - Density: 54.72/km^{2} (141.7/sq mi)
- Time zone: UTC+1 (CET)
  - Summer (DST): UTC+2 (CEST)
- Postal code: 7432
- Website: www.oberschuetzen.at

Oberschützen (Hungarian: Felsőlövő, Felső-Lövő derived from "Felső"=upper, "Lövő"=shooter) is a town in the district of Oberwart in the Austrian state of Burgenland.

== Subdivisions ==
- Aschau im Burgenland
- Oberschützen
- Schmiedrait
- Unterschützen
- Willersdorf

== Population ==
Historical population
Year	Pop.	±%
1869	3,134	—
1880	3,395	+8.3%
1890	3,464	+2.0%
1900	3,179	−8.2%
1910	3,096	−2.6%
1923	2,961	−4.4%
1934	3,185	+7.6%
1939	2,998	−5.9%
1951	2,577	−14.0%
1961	2,424	−5.9%
1971	2,414	−0.4%
1981	2,486	+3.0%
1991	2,411	−3.0%
2001	2,289	−5.1%
2011	2,358	+3.0%

== Twin town ==
- Sárospatak, Hungary (2024)

== See also ==
- Lövő (German: Schützen), a town in Hungary
