= Piano Sonatas Nos. 19 and 20 (Beethoven) =

Piano sonatas written by Beethoven

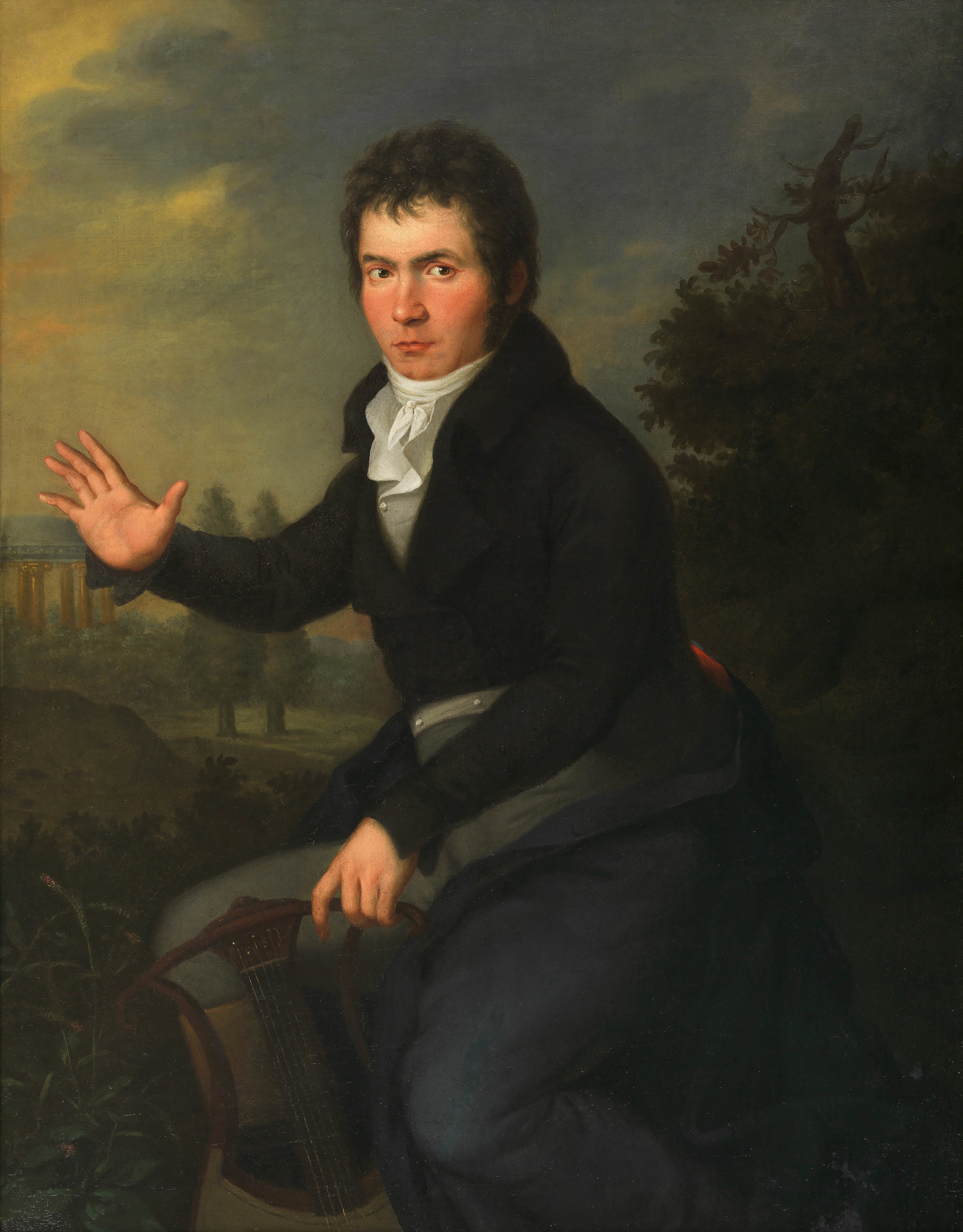
Portrait of Ludwig van Beethoven (age 33) by Joseph Willibrord Mähler (c. 1804)

The Piano Sonata No. 19 in G minor, Op. 49, No. 1, and Piano Sonata No. 20 in G major, Op. 49, No. 2, are short sonatas by Ludwig van Beethoven, published in 1805 (although the works were actually composed a decade earlier in early to mid 1797). Both works are approximately eight minutes in length, and are split into two movements. These sonatas are referred to as the Leichte Sonaten to be given to his friends and students. They are his first two numbered piano sonatas with only two movements rather than three or four.

These two sonatas were possibly written around the time Beethoven composed the Third and Fourth sonatas, but because they were published in Vienna in 1805, nearly a decade after they were actually written, they were assigned then-current opus and sonata numbers, which classified them alongside works from the composer's middle period. Very similar circumstances caused Beethoven's Piano Concerto No. 2 to appear as his second, even though it predated the first.

Beethoven often suppressed works in his early years, either revising them later for publication or determining that they were not fit. In fact, he withheld many early works from publication for life. In the case of these two sonatas, it was Kaspar van Beethoven, the composer's brother, who decided they were worthy of publication. Against the composer's will, he presented them to a publishing house, thus allowing posterity to hear works that might otherwise have been lost or destroyed.

== Sonata No. 19 ==
Charles Rosen, while noting the sonata's lack of technical challenges, states that it is a "deeply affecting and distinguished work".

I. Andante

II. Allegro
Performed by Artur Schnabel in 1932

The work has two movements:

1. Andante
2. Rondo: Allegro

=== I. Andante ===

The first movement is written in standard sonata-allegro form. After the first and second theme, it moves into the recapitulation with very little development. After restating the theme in the bass with new counterpoint in the treble, the work closes with a brief coda, ending with a Picardy third.

=== II. Rondo: Allegro ===

Beethoven skips the slow movement and dance movement and moves directly to the finale, which is a six-part sonata-rondo (A-B-A-C-B-A) in G major. The three contrasting episodes are in B-flat major, C major, and G major. This sonata has been notably performed by Sviatoslav Richter and Daniel Barenboim.

== Sonata No. 20 ==
This sonata is a relatively simple work, featuring less sophistication than most of the other piano sonatas. Strangely, there are no dynamic indications in the autograph or first edition. It is considered the easier of the two "easy sonatas", and is also considered the easiest of all the Beethoven piano sonatas.

I. Allegro ma non troppo

II. Tempo di menuetto
Performed by Artur Schnabel in 1932

Both movements are in G major, making the sonata homotonal.

1. Allegro ma non troppo, 2/2
2. Tempo di Menuetto, 3/4

=== I. Allegro ma non troppo ===
The first movement involves two themes, starting with a stately theme based heavily on a G major triad and moving on to a more playful and lively second theme in D major, also based on the triad of D major. Both themes undergo only minimal development in the keys of D minor, A minor, and E minor before the recapitulation with the themes presented in the tonic G major and its subdominant C major, making for a simplified sonata form. The work features, for the pianist, extreme triplet technique in both hands and the balance between the hands is most critical.

=== II. Tempo di Menuetto ===
The second movement of the Piano Sonata No. 20 shares a melodic theme with the Minuet of the Op. 20 Septet. Because the Septet was the later piece (1799–1800), Beethoven's suppression of the sonata and reuse of one of its themes suggests that he perhaps planned to scrap the piano work altogether. But the composer was known to recycle melodies, in some instances several times (for example, the Eroica Variations). This movement is cast in the form of a rondo, with the main rondo theme being, essentially, a minuet; the minuet features a charming melody that, along with its accompanying material, is repeated several times, varying somewhat in appearance, but remaining simple and unsophisticated.

== Sources ==
- Woodstra, Chris; Gerald Brennan; Allen Schrott (2005). All music guide to classical music: The Definitive Guide to Classical Music at Google Books, p. 111. Hal Leonard Corporation. ISBN 0-87930-865-6.
