= Le nozze di Figaro (Kleiber recording) =

1955 studio album by Erich Kleiber

Studio album by Erich Kleiber
- Released: 1955
- Studios: Redoutensaal, Vienna
- Genre: Opera
- Length: 172:28
- Language: Italian
- Label: Decca
- Producers: Victor Olof, Peter Andry

Le nozze di Figaro is a 1955 studio recording of Wolfgang Amadeus Mozart's opera of the same name released by the Decca label with the Vienna Philharmonic and Choir of Vienna State Opera conducted by Erich Kleiber. The cast of singers include Lisa Della Casa as the Countess, Hilde Güden as Susanna, Suzanne Danco as Cherubino, Cesare Siepi as Figaro and Alfred Poell as the Count, as well as Hilde Rössel-Majdan, Fernando Corena and Murray Dickie.

The recording was released in 1955 and received critical acclaim for its conducting, singing and orchestra playing. Critics noted the immersive drama of the performance, the beauty, elegance, and unvarnished nature of the singing. Regarding the piece as a whole, critics praised the flow, balance, cohesion, and blend of the parts. Hilde Güden garnered particular praise for her performance, while music critics viewed the recording as a sincere representation of Mozart's music.

A winner of France's Grand Prix du Disque and Diapason d'Or, the recording was unusual for its playful, punchy, and lively tone and elements of dramatic acting, aspects of which foreshadowed period-instrument recordings. It was the first recording of the opera to include all the recitatives. A gramophone classic, the recording is often cited as one of the most authoritative interpretations of the opera and has been ranked among the top classical music recordings. Decca rereleased the recording as part of its Legends – Legendary Performances series in 1999.

== Background ==
Erich Kleiber started making recordings for London Records in 1948 until 1955, a year before his death. Before the Le nozze di Figaro recording, Kleiber made recordings of Beethoven and Tchaikovsky symphonies and Mozart Symphony No. 40. From May 29 to June 28, 1954, Kleiber recorded Richard Strauss' Der Rosenkavalier with the Vienna Philharmonic and Vienna State Opera, which Decca released to critical acclaim. In October of the same year, Kleiber recorded Mozart's 6 Dances K. 600 with the Kölner Rundfunk-Sinfonie-Orchester. In April 1955, Kleiber recorded Beethoven's Symphony No. 3 with the Vienna Philharmonic in Vienna, which Decca only released in 1959. Kleiber's recording of Le nozze di Figaro would be his only Decca recording of a Mozart opera.

Kleiber's Le nozze di Figaro followed more than 30 recordings of the opera. The first recording of the opera was with Fritz Busch at the Glyndenbourne Festival in 1934, a recording which helped to reintroduce Figaro into the repertoire. Other early recordings included conductors such as Ettore Panizza (1940), Herbert von Karajan (1950), Vittorio Gui (1955), and Hans Rosbaud (1955), as well as Bruno Walter, Karl Böhm, Erich Leinsdorf, Ferenc Fricsay, and Wilhelm Furtwängler, among others. The Vienna Philharmonic had already recorded the opera six times, once with Karajan (1950) and once with Furtwängler (1953). Also, during this time, the Metropolitan Opera had made approximately 10 recordings with various conductors.

== Recording and release ==
Decca 1999 reissue cover design with Lisa Della Casa left (Louis Melançon, Metropolitan Opera Archives) and Erich Kleiber right (Popperfoto)

The stereo recording occurred in the Redoutensaal, Vienna, Austria, from June 21 to 27, 1955. A Decca-built mixer was used with Neumann M50 and KM56 microphones on BTR 1 recording tape. To capture the sound of the orchestra, the Decca recording team employed the famous "Decca tree," a stereo recording system with three microphones.

London Records released the opera recording as a box set on 4 LP records with a libretto in 1955, using the "ffrr" Full Frequency Range Recording technique. Decca re-released the recording under the catalog series Stereophonic in 1959. In 1989, Decca remastered and reissued the opera set as 3 CDs with a libretto under the Grand Opera series. In 1999, Decca printed a 3-CD set with libretto as part of the Decca Legends – Legendary Performances series. The new release included a 96 kHz 24-bit super digital stereo transfer from the original analog and it received the 466 369-2 catalog number. The booklet contains 100 pages with librettos in English, French, German, and Italian, translated by Avril Bardoni and with notes by Warwick Thompson.

== Reception ==
In the same year of its release, James Hinton Jr. of High Fidelity commended the recording, writing "The cardinal virtue of the new London Figaro is precisely that it is not a string of arias, presented rock-candy fashion, but a unified, consistent, and in most respects, extraordinarily fine performance of Le nozze di Figaro – every last bit of it." Hinton further points out the singers' "high degree of integration into the ensemble without loss of personality". He particularly praised the singing of Lisa Della Casa, Hilde Güden, and Suzanne Danco and the beautiful blend of the "Sull'aria" duet between Della Casa and Güden. The review concludes, "As a representation of the score, this is a superb set, with no present competition, and its excellencies are such that it will exceedingly hard to displace. Very highly recommended."

A review from 1956 in the Opera Spotlight section of The American Record Guide gave Kleiber’s recording the following assessment, “The late Fritz Busch was as successful as any on this score, but of the others, only Erich Kleiber with his warm-hearted Viennese characteristics lends an enchantment to the orchestral sequences that remains in mind after the last bar of the music is heard. Kleiber’s artistry is closest to the heart of Mozart, in my estimation. His tempos are never rushed like von Karajan’s, nor leisurely. His flow of music is smooth with infinitely subtle melodic detailing.” The reviewer pointed out the rich tonal sounds of the large orchestra of the Vienna Philharmonic and the excellence of Decca’s sound recording. The review characterized Seipi’s voice as rich and sensuous and Güden's as “light and gracious” with a “vivid personality.” The viewer described Della Casa as “a lovely artist with consistent vocal beauty” and regarded Danco’s singing as cool but smooth, elegant, and subtle.

Writing in the "Best of the Month" section of HiFi/Stereo Review, a reviewer gave the following appraisal, "Since its monophonic release nearly three years ago, this performance has taken its place as one of the most perfect recordings ever made. The late Kleiber's guiding hand produces an unforgettable experience in re-creative magic. And every singer in the cast must have been transfixed by Kleiber's overwhelming authority and complete mastery of every element of the score, for every member of the cast is a revelation in his or her part." The reviewer goes on to describes Güden as "an incomparable Susanna," Siepi "the ideal Figaro" and Danco "an unbelievably good Cherubino." The reviewer further points out the high quality of the stereophonic sound produced by Decca's remastering of the original mono recording.

In a 1961 review from Hi-Fi/Stereo Review, one reviewer gave the performance a superlative rating and reviewed the recording as first-rate, commenting: "Only the most sensitive and unerring musicianship on the part of singers, orchestra and above all, conductor, can do this masterpiece Le nozze di Figaro justice and the 1955 London recording conducted by the late Erich Kleiber does just that." The reviewer claimed that Kleiber's recording captured the "Mozartian essence" of the piece better than later recordings by Giulini and Leinsdorf. The review describes Danco's performance as Cherubino as "colorless" and a "minor weak point" in the recording.

Stanley Sadie of Gramophone magazine has called this recording a classic "beautifully played by the Vienna Philharmonic, conducted with poise and vitality and a real sense of the drama unfolding through the music." Sadie praised Güden for being "impeccably graceful and perfectly timed" and noted the balance among the male singers. Regarding the singing, Sadie wrote, "Everything is truly sung: the singers are never allowed, even had they wanted to, to skimp on the music to convey the drama, and they have rather to use the music to convey it."

Philip Hope-Wallace, writing in the Gramophone gave an equally positive review, noting "it is relaxed, beautifully musical and never whipped up … With the meaningful recitative, steady 'level' of the recording, beautiful silent surface and clear balance even in the thickest ensembles, a truly engulfing experience of this opera of operas is imparted." Hope-Wallace described the recititative as "beautifully acted" with leisure and grace.

In a review from Classics Today, Robert Levine gave the recording a rating of 8 out of 10 for artistic quality and wrote: "This justly famous 1955 recording has not lost its power to impress. Erich Kleiber's leadership is golden–witty and warm, with plenty of breathing space for the singers, a knowing hand in the ensembles, and an always-true sense of proportion." Concerning the performers, Levine praised the complimentary nature of Seipi and Poell. He especially lauded Gueden's performance, writing, "Hilde Gueden may be the best Susanna on discs." Levine criticized the performance of Lisa Della Casa as "too cool" and that of Suzanne Danco as uneventful.

== Accolades ==
- Grand Prix du Disque from Académie Charles Cros
- Diapason magazine's Diapason d'Or
- Sound & Vision magazine's "Best of the Month" (1959) and Recording of Special Merit (1961)

== Significance and legacy ==
Erich Kleiber's Le nozze de Figaro was the opera's first recording with the complete recitative. The recording caused a sensation due to its unconventional playfulness, zest, wit, and energy that differentiated the recording from the classic repertoire. The recording contains dramatic elements of acting infused into opera, a combination that was not universally accepted at the time of the recording. The performance has been characterized as having a Viennese flair of "punchiness" that predates the style of period instruments. According to the German Klassike Akeznte, Kleiber did not allow embellishments and focused entirely on the music. The recording set a new standard for the opera in its immersive, unfiltered and dramatic singing and playing style.

The recording is considered a gramophone classic and has been called a benchmark and landmark recording. Seven years after its release, David Hall of Hi-Fi Stereo noted that Kleiber's Figaro "remains one of the great recordings of the century." More recently, the BBC Music Magazine ranked the recording 38 among the top 50 greatest classical recordings of all time. Gramophone Magazine included the recording among the top 50 Mozart recordings and selected it as one of a few recordings among over 150 recordings of Le nozze di Figaro. The magazine called the recording "a classic of the classics of the gramophone." The Penguin Guide included Kleiber's Figaro in its selection of the 1000 finest classical recordings.

The Metropolitan Opera guide writes, "From Vienna at the dawn of stereo came a Figaro–the first to be presented complete–that remains to this day one of the most authoritative, persuasive and lovable accounts on record." Regarding a CD release of the recording, the Austrian newspaper Die Presse wrote, "The recording is more than half a century old – and is still considered by connoisseurs to be the best complete performance of Mozart's Le nozze di Figaro on record." The newspaper continues, "The Vienna Philharmonic captivates the listener right from the start. Even the first bars of the overture sound like a festival performance, far removed from any repertoire routine. And much of what was supposedly "invented" later by pioneers of period instruments is already prefigured here: Mozart, fresh, lively, sometimes racy, always psychological and full of wonderful stage temperament."

== Track listing ==
CD 1 (289 466 370-2)

- 1-1 Ouverture – 4:09

Act 1

- 1-2 Cinque...dieci...venti...trenta... – 3:25
- 1-3 Se a caso madama – 4:00
- 1-4 Bravo signor padrone!...Se vuol ballare – 4:19
- 1-5 La vendetta – 3:46
- 1-5 Via, resti servita – 4:12
- 1-7 Non so più cosa son – 5:54
- 1-8 Cosa sento! tosto andate – 10:32
- 1-9 Non più andrai – 3:46

Act 2

- 1-10 Porgi amor – 8:10
- 1-11 Voi che sapete – 3:51
- 1-12 Venite, inginocchiatevi – 5:48
- 1-13 Che novita! – 1:12
- 1-14 Susanna, or via, sortite – 4:03
- 1-15 Aprite, presto aprite – 1:39

Total time: 68 minutes, 51 seconds

CD 2 (289 466 371-2)

- 2-1 Tutto e como il lasciai – 1:19
- 2-2 Esci omai, garzon malnato – 8:43
- 2-3 Signore, di fuori – 9:19
- 2-4 Voi signor, che giusto siete – 3:50

Act 3

- 2-5 Che imbarazzo e mai questo! – 2:20
- 2-6 Crudel! perché finora – 3:20
- 2-7 Hai già vinto la causa!...Vedrò, mentr'io sospiro – 6:35
- 2-8 Riconosci in questo amplesso – 6:33
- 2-9 E Susanna non vien!...Dove Sono i bei momenti – 6:39
- 2-10 Cosa mi narri?...Canzonetta sull'aria – 7:42
- 2-11 Ecco la marcia – 6:23

Total time: 62 minutes, 49 seconds

CD 3 (289 466 372-2)

Act 4

- 3-1 L'ho perduta, me meschina! – 4:37
- 3-2 Il capro e la capretta – 5:31
- 3-3 In quegl'anni, in cui val poco – 4:07
- 3-4 Tutto è disposto...Aprite un po' quegli'occhi – 5:26
- 3-5 Giunse alfin il momento...Deh vieni, non tardar – 4:49
- 3-6 Pian pianin le andrò più presso – 11:41
- 3-7 Gente, gente! All'armi, all'armi! – 4:38

Total time: 40 minutes, 48 seconds

== Personnel ==
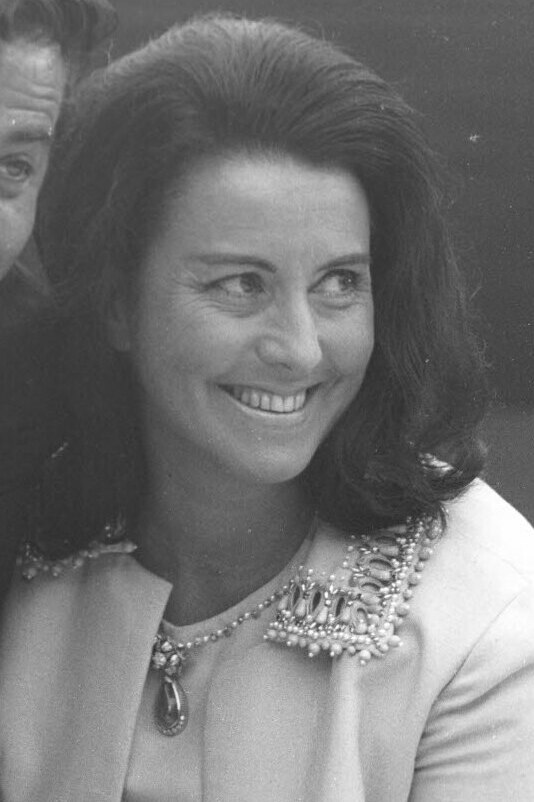
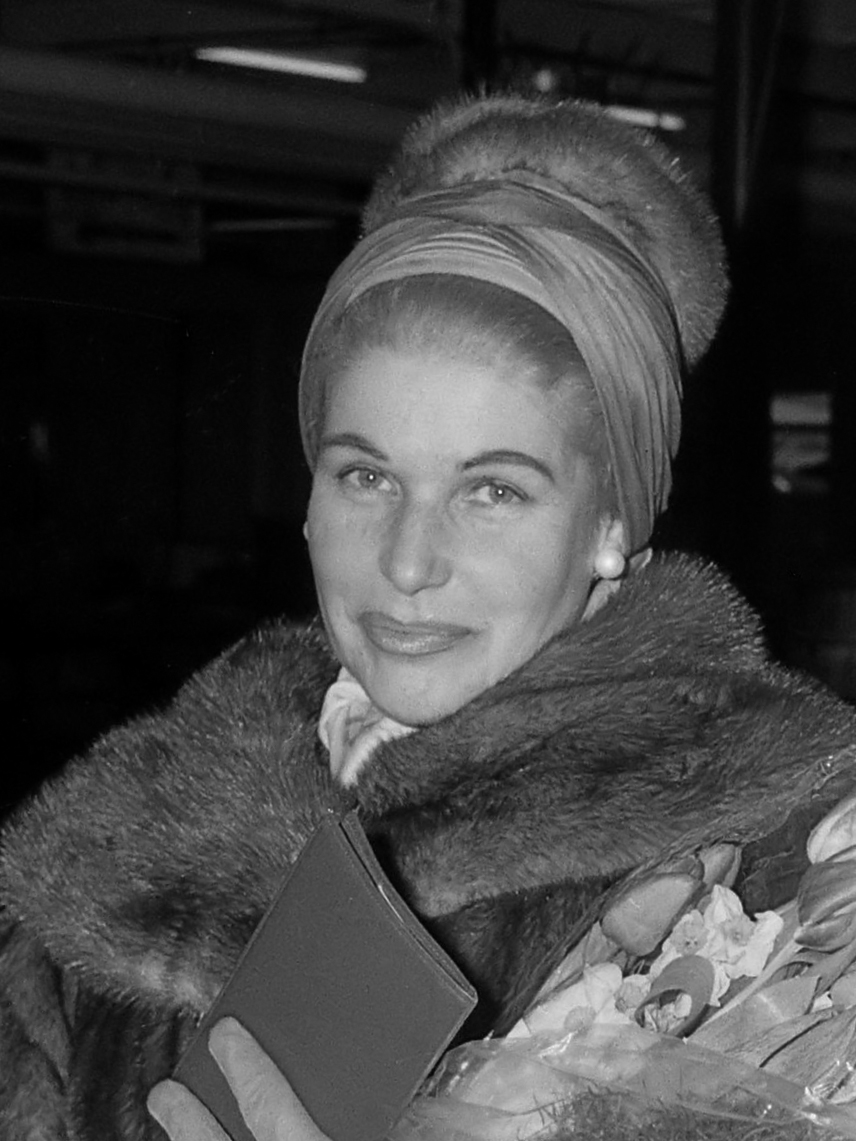
Lisa Della Casa (top) and Hilde Güden (bottom) both received praise for their singing.

=== Musical ===
- Erich Kleiber, conductor
- Vienna Philharmonic & Vienna State Opera Chorus
- Alfred Poell (baritone), Count Almaviva
- Lisa della Casa (soprano), Countess Almaviva
- Hilde Güden (soprano), Susanna
- Cesare Siepi (bass), Figaro
- Suzanne Danco (soprano), Cherubino
- Hilde Rössel-Majdan (mezzo-soprano), Marcellina
- Fernando Corena (bass), Doctor Bartolo
- Murray Dickie (tenor), Don Basilio
- Hugo Meyer-Welfing (tenor), Don Curzio
- Anny Felbermayer (soprano), Barbarina
- Harald Pröglhof (bass), Antonio
- Suzanne Danco (soprano), girl
- Anny Felbermayer (soprano), girl

=== Other ===
- Victor Olof, producer
- Peter Andry, producer
- James Brown, engineer
- Cyril Windebank, engineer
- Andrew Wedman, remastering
- Mark Millington, art direction

== See also ==
- Le nozze di Figaro (Giulini 1959 recording)
- Le nozze di Figaro (Georg Solti recording)
