= Le nozze di Figaro (Georg Solti recording) =

- Decca CD: 410 150 2

Studio album by Georg Solti
- Released: 1982
- Studios: Kingsway Hall, London
- Genre: Opera
- Length: 168:14
- Language: Italian
- Label: Decca
- Producer: Christopher Raeburn

Le nozze di Figaro is a 168-minute studio recording of Wolfgang Amadeus Mozart's opera of the same name, performed by a cast of singers headed by Sir Thomas Allen, Jane Berbié, Yvonne Kenny, Philip Langridge, Kurt Moll, Lucia Popp, Samuel Ramey, Frederica von Stade, Robert Tear and Dame Kiri Te Kanawa with the London Philharmonic Orchestra under the direction of Sir Georg Solti. It was released by Decca in 1982.

Upon release of the album, critics highly praised the singing of the cast, especially that of Kiri Te Kanawa, Lucia Popp, Frederica von Stade, and Thomas Allen. The Metropolitan Opera Guide considers Te Kanawa's performance the highlight of the recording and notes that the role brought her fame. The recording is marked by contrasting tempos between the orchestra and vocal parts, which has led to some criticism. Nevertheless, the recording won a Grammy Award in 1983 and has been ranked among the greatest recordings of all time.

== Background ==
In accordance with the musicological consensus that held sway at the time of its making, the recording follows the traditional ordering of the numbers in the opera's third act, with the Countess's aria "Dove sono" placed after the sextet "Riconosci in questo amplesso". Marcellina's and Basilio's arias, sometimes dropped, are both included.

The opera is performed with non-period instruments.

== Recording and release ==
The album was digitally recorded in June and December 1981 in the Kingsway Hall, London.

In 1982, Decca and London Records released the album as a quadruple LP with a libretto, translations and notes (catalogue numbers D267D4 in Europe and LDR 74001 in the US). It was also issued on cassette (catalogue number Decca K26742) In 1984, Decca and London issued the album as a triple CD (catalogue number 410 150 2) with a 368-page booklet including a libretto, translations and notes by Stanley Sadie.

The cover art shared by the LP, cassette and CD editions of the album is The Gardens of the Villa d'Este at Tivoli by Jean-Honoré Fragonard (1732–1806), a painting in the Wallace Collection, London.

== Critical reception ==
=== Reviews ===
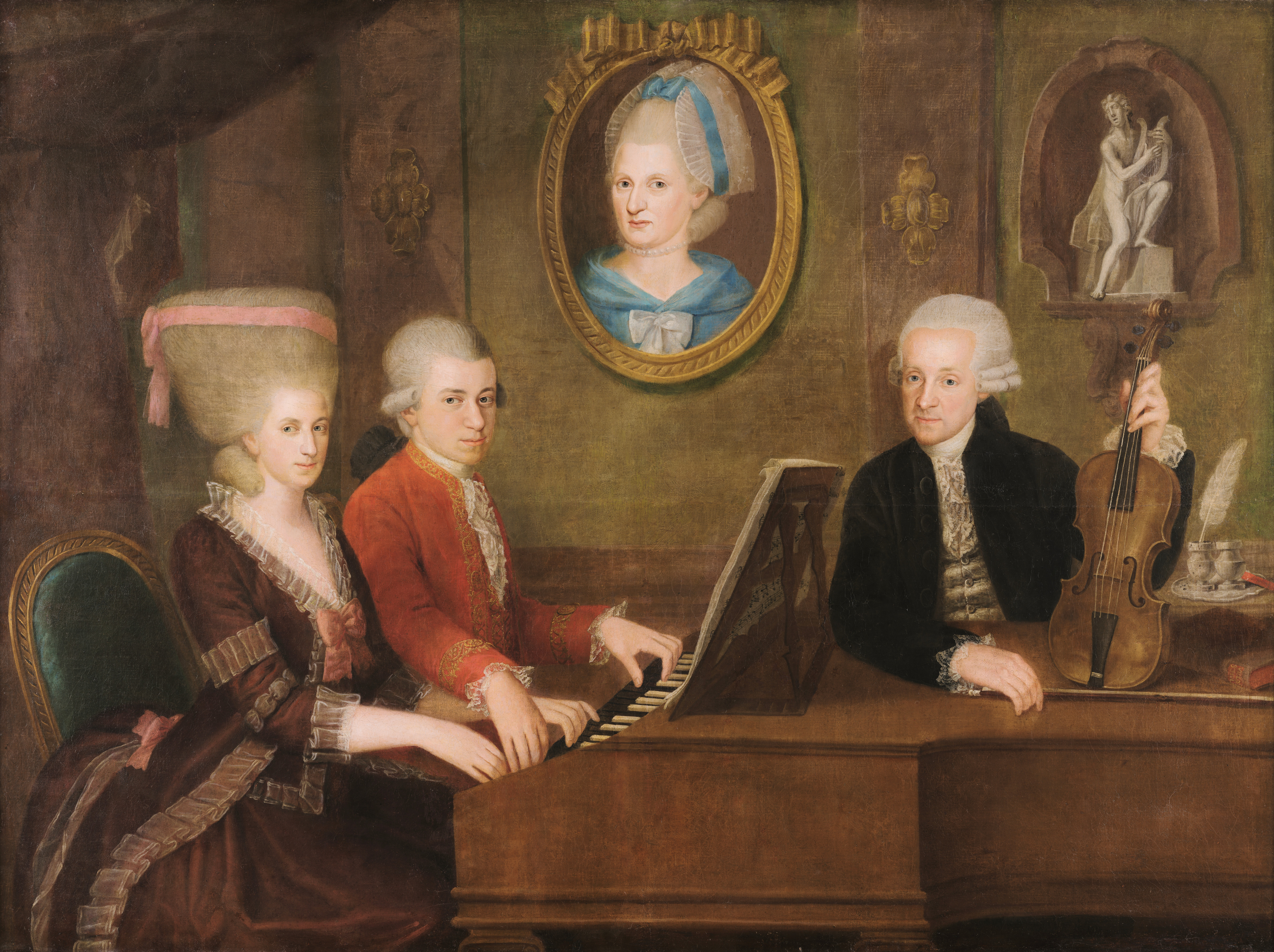
Maria Anna, Wolfgang and Leopold Mozart painted by Johann Nepomuk della Croce in 1780

Alan Blyth reviewed the album on LP in Gramophone in November 1982. Its cast, he wrote, was the finest company ever to have performed the opera in a recording studio. Kiri Te Kanawa, precise in recitatives and a bright golden thread in the tapestry of her ensembles, sang the Countess's music with "her familiarly warm, soft tone unimpaired and a much greater understanding than in the past [of how to achieve] the maximum with the text". Lucia Popp was the recitatives' "life and soul", a clever, amusing, "spirited [Susanna] very much at the centre of affairs". Frederica von Stade was "the very epitome of restless, ardent youthfulness" as Cherubino, seemingly more at ease with Solti than she had been a few years earlier when recording the role for Herbert von Karajan (see Le nozze di Figaro (Herbert von Karajan April 1978 recording). Jane Berbié, on the other hand, a "lively" Marcellina who had sung for Karajan too, had delivered her showpiece aria better for the latter. The album's male singers were as impressive as its women. Thomas Allen's Count was as potent a figure as Allen had made him on stage, with its "cutting edge undiminished, its sexual dimension evident in every bar", his recitatives, arias and ensembles equally infused with the Count's angry, jealous lust for his valet's fiancée. Samuel Ramey's Figaro had a voice more like his master's than was ideal, but was "a formidable rival to the Count", forceful in his resentful defiance, "a servant full of indignation, ... no prancing barber but an incipient revolutionary". The most enjoyable performance in a minor role was that of Giorgio Tadeo as a "garlicky, rip-roaring" ancestor of Gaffer Gamgee. But there was also much pleasure to be had from Kurt Moll's immaculate, "rollicking" Bartolo and Robert Tear's serpentine Basilio – a performance so elaborately crafted that even the character's tedious act 4 aria became interesting. The London Philharmonic Orchestra played well, although not as well as they had on other occasions. The only musician on the album who was open to serious criticism was its conductor. Georg Solti took recitatives faster than was dramatically realistic, and drove most of the opera forward at a "peremptory" pace that added to the excitement of its finales but subtracted from its warmth elsewhere. Solti's was a reading of "brusque rhythm and very precise detail", but "rather too little humanity in its unsmiling features". Decca's production made intelligent use of the stereo soundstage, but had two definite weaknesses – the opera was recorded in an acoustic too reverberant to suit the libretto's private, domestic settings, and the digital recording process has placed the musicians in a "glassy no-man's-land". In sum, the album could "certainly not be improved on today", but older versions of the opera conducted by Carlo Maria Giulini and Sir Colin Davis were even better.

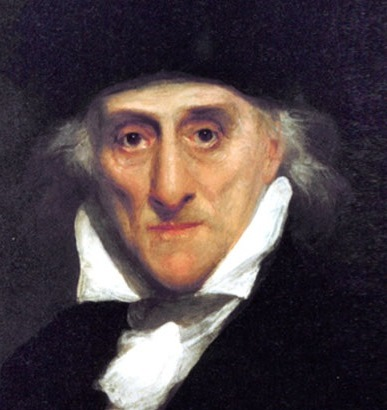
Lorenzo da Ponte painted by Samuel Morse, circa 1830

George Jellinek reviewed the album on LP in the "Best Recordings of the Month" pages of Stereo Review in January 1983. Kiri Te Kanawa's Countess, he wrote, was "exquisite, though with a subdued quality that does not project a strong enough profile for the role". The Countess's climactic declaration of forgiveness in act 4 was "thrown away" by the manner in which Georg Solti conducted it. As Susanna and Cherubino respectively, Lucia Popp and Frederica von Stade were "perfectly in character and admirably vocalized", although, again because of Solti, von Stade's "Non so più" lacked the appeal and expressiveness with which she usually invested it. As Marcellina, Jane Berbié sounded "frayed". Thomas Allen took Jellinek by surprise: as well as presenting the Count with the "right kind of imperious elegance", he brought a vocal weight to the role which the critic had imagined to be beyond his resources. As Figaro, Samuel Ramey was "ideal" – "vigorous, dynamic and youthful sounding, characterizing the role with the right combination of cunning and defiance". The best of the remainder of the cast was Giorgio Tadeo, "solid" as the gardener, Antonio. Kurt Moll's Bartolo was sung with "remarkable sonority" but unimaginatively, and Robert Tear's rather nasal voice, while good at conveying Basilio's oiliness, was not very pleasant to listen to. Solti's conducting was on balance disappointing. After a sprint through the overture, he chose tempi that were mostly successful, and his overall interpretation of the score had a praiseworthy self-consistency. But his reading was not as closely focused as it might have been, and was "rather short on charm". The opera's best loved passages were performed without some of their usual magic. Nevertheless, the excellence of the album's five principal soloists was such that overall, the set was the best Le nozze di Figaro of the stereo era.

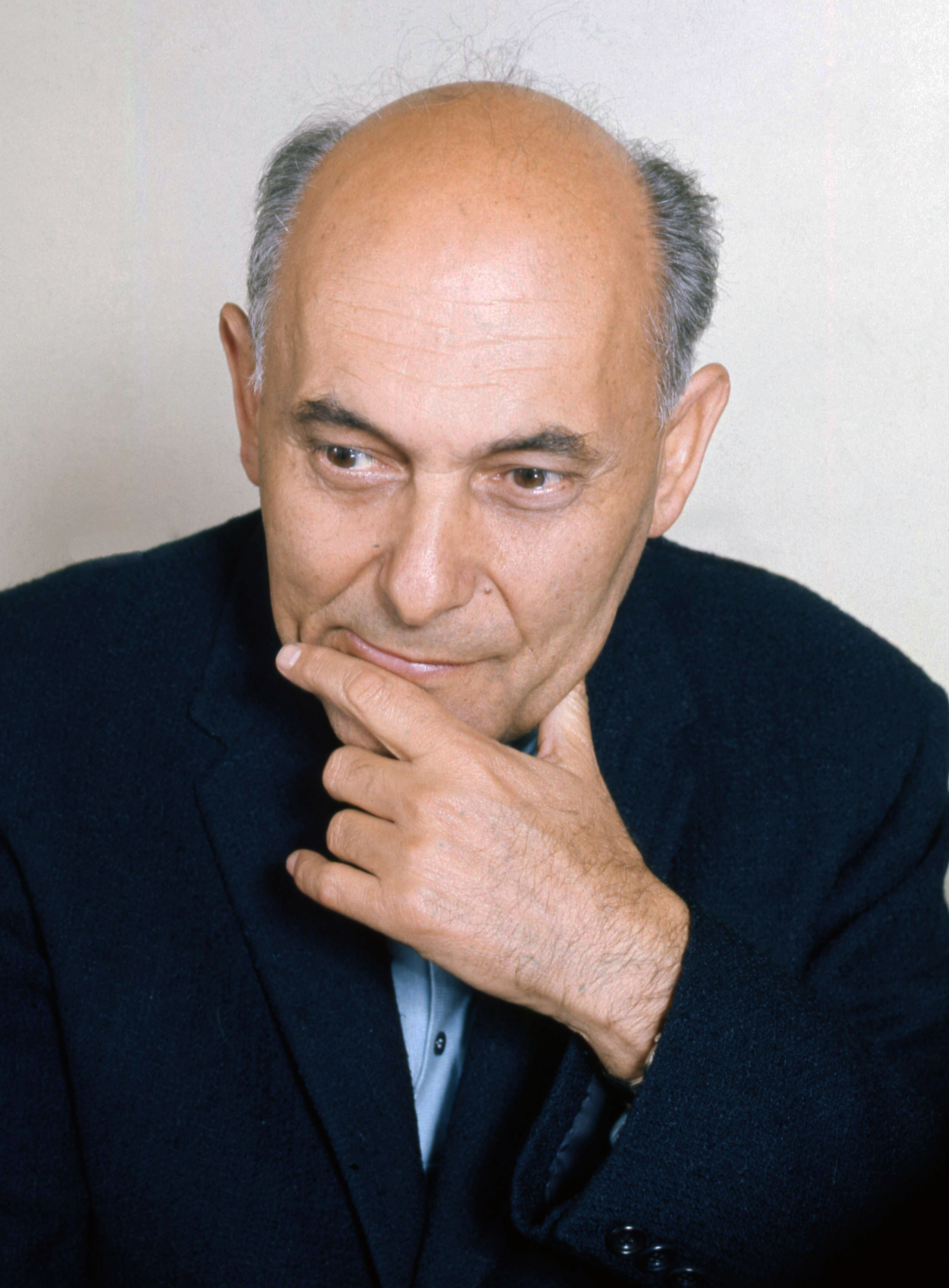
Sir Georg Solti photographed by Allen Warren in 1975

J. B. Steane reviewed the album on LP in Gramophone in April 1983. "In this Figaro", he wrote, "all is well and much is magnificent". Never, in all his many years of opera-going, had he heard a Countess as good as Kiri Te Kanawa's. Lucia Popp's Susanna was "delicious", and Frederica von Stade as Cherubino was as "delectable" as her colleagues. Thomas Allen's Count had "plenty of amorous honey" in his voice, and the tone of Samuel Ramey's Figaro had commendable "firmness and body" from his lowest notes to his highest. The chorus was "fresh voiced and precise", the London Philharmonic Orchestra "alert and sensitive" and the engineering first class.

The audio expert Geoffrey Horn reviewed the album in Gramophone in April 1984. Like his musical colleagues, he was impressed by the quality of Solti's cast, and like Blyth and Jellinek, slightly less impressed by Solti's conducting. The London Philharmonic Orchestra sounded "racily forced" and often weary. His chief complaint repeated a point that Blyth had made. The reverberant acoustic of Decca's Kingsway Hall made it difficult for listeners to imagine that the action of the opera was truly taking place in the domestic settings decreed by the librettist,

Richard Lawrence included the album in a survey of the discography of the opera in Gramophone's 2011 Awards issue. Its cast, he wrote, was "glittering". Kiri Te Kanawa's Countess was "meltingly beautiful", Yvonne Kenny's Barbarina "touchingly worried" in her search for her lost pin, Thomas Allen "quite simply superb" as the Count and Samuel Ramey "round-toned" and "forceful" as Figaro. He was surprised that in Basilio's aria, the London Philharmonic's horns had played an octave lower than the canonical edition of the score required. His ultimate verdict on the album was that somehow it didn't quite satisfy.

=== Accolade ===
In the year after its release, the album won the Grammy award for the best operatic recording of 1983.

== Track listing, CD 1 ==
Wolfgang Amadeus Mozart (1756–1791)

Le nozze di Figaro, opera comica in quattro atti (Vienna, 1786), K. 492, with a libretto by Lorenzo da Ponte (1749–1838) after Pierre Beaumarchais (1732–1799)

- 1 (3:51) Sinfonia

Act One

- 2 (3:24) No. 1 Duetto "Cinque...dieci...venti" (Figaro, Susanna); recitativo "Cosa stai misurando" (Susanna, Figaro)
- 3 (4:01) No. 2 Duetto "Se a caso madama" (Figaro, Susanna); recitativo "Or bene, ascolta, e taci" (Susanna, Figaro)
- 4 (4:21) Recitativo "Bravo, signor padrone" (Figaro); No. 3 Cavatina "Se vuol ballare" (Figaro); recitativo "Ed aspettaste il giorno" (Bartolo, Marcellina)
- 5 (3:47) No. 4 Aria "La vendetta" (Bartolo); recitativo "Tutto ancor non ho perso" (Marcellina, Susanna)
- 6 (3:49) No. 5 Duetto "Via resti servita" (Marcellina, Susanna); recitativo "Va là, vecchia pedante" (Susanna, Cherubino)
- 7 (5:59) No. 6 Aria "Non so più" (Cherubino); recitativo "Ah, son perduto" (Cherubino, Susanna, Conte, Basilio)
- 8 (9:29) No. 7 Terzetto "Cosa sento!" (Conte, Basilio, Susanna); recitativo "Basilio, in traccia tosto" (Conte, Susanna, Cherubino, Basilio); No. 8a Coro "Giovanni liete" (Chorus); recitativo "Evviva" (Figaro, Susanna, Basilio, Cherubino, Conte)
- 9 (3:33) No. 9 Aria "Non più andrai" (Figaro)

Act Two

- 10 (9:09) No. 10 Cavatina "Porgi, amor, qualche ristoro" (Contessa); recitativo "Vieni, cara Susanna" (Contessa, Susanna, Figaro, Cherubino)
- 11 (3:54) No. 11 Canzona "Voi che sapete" (Cherubino); recitativo "Bravo! che bella voce" (Contessa, Susanna, Cherubino)
- 12 (5:21) No. 12 Aria "Venite, inginocchiatevi" (Susanna); recitativo "Quante buffonerie" (Contessa, Susanna, Cherubino, Conte)

== Track listing, CD 2 ==
Act Two, continued

- 1 (1:18) Recitativo "Che novità!" (Conte, Contessa)
- 2 (3:49) No. 13 Terzetto "Susanna or via sortite" (Conte, Contessa, Susanna); recitativo "Dunque, voi non aprite" (Conte, Contessa)
- 3 (2:40) No. 14 Duettino "Aprite, presto, aprite" (Susanna, Cherubino); recitativo "O guarda il demonietto" (Susanna, Conte, Contessa)
- 4 (7:41) No. 15 Finale, Part 1: "Esci, ormai, garzon malnato" (Conte, Contessa, Susanna)
- 5 (8:42) No. 15 Finale, Part 2: "Signori, di fuori son già" (Figaro, Conte, Contessa, Susanna, Antonio)
- 6 (3:46) No. 15 Finale, Part 3: "Voi signor, che giusto siete" (Marcellina, Basilio, Bartolo, Conte, Susanna, Contessa, Figaro)

Act Three

- 7 (2:30) Recitativo "Che imbarazzo è mai questo" (Conte, Contessa, Susanna)
- 8 (3:30) No. 16 Duetto "Crudel! perchè finora" (Conte, Susanna); recitativo "E perchè fosti meco" (Conte, Susanna, Figaro)
- 9 (6:48) No. 17 Recitativo "Hai già vinta la causa?" ed Aria "Vedrò, mentr’io sospiro" (Conte); recitativo "È decisa la lite" (Curzio. Marcellina, Figaro, Conte, Bartolo)
- 10 (6:30) No. 18 Sestetto "Riconosci in questo amplesso" (Marcellina, Figaro, Bartolo, Curzio, Conte, Susanna); recitativo "Eccovi, o caro amico" (Marcellina, Bartolo, Susanna, Figaro, Barbarina, Cherubino)

== Track listing, CD 3 ==
Act Three, continued

- 1 (7:33) No. 19 Recitativo "E Susanna non vien" ed Aria "Dove sono i bei momenti" (Contessa); recitativo "Io vi dico" (Antonio, Conte)
- 2 (7:23) Recitativo "Cosa mi narri" (Contessa, Susanna); No. 20 Duetto "Sull'aria ... che soave zeffiretto" (Contessa, Susanna); recitativo "Piegato è il foglio" (Susanna, Contessa); No. 21 Coro "Ricevete, o padroncina" (Chorus); recitativo "Queste sono, Madama" (Barbarina, Contessa, Susanna, Antonio, Conte, Cherubino, Figaro)
- 3 (5:58) No. 22 Finale: "Ecco la marcia" (Figaro, Susanna, Conte, Contessa, Chorus)

Act Four

- 4 (4:32) No. 23 Cavatina " L'ho perduta, me meschina" (Barbarina); recitativo "Barbarina, cos'hai" (Figaro, Barbarina, Marcellina)
- 5 (5:22) No. 24 Aria "Il capro e la capretta" (Marcellina); recitativo "Nel padiglione a manca" (Barbarina, Figaro, Bartolo, Basilio)
- 6 (3:55) No. 25 Aria "In quegli anni in cui val poco" (Basilio)
- 7 (4:45) No. 26 Recitativo "Tutto è disposto" ed Aria "O Aprite un po' quegli occhi" (Figaro); recitativo "Signora ella mi disse" (Susanna, Marcellina, Contessa, Figaro
- 8 (5:14) No. 27 Recitativo "Giunse alfin il momento" ed Aria "Deh vieni, non tardar" (Susanna); recitativo "Perfida" (Figaro, Cherubino, Contessa)
- 9 (10:34) No. 28 Finale, Part 1: "Pian pianin le andrò più presso" (Cherubino, Contessa, Conte, Susanna, Figaro)
- 10 (5:06) No. 28 Finale, Part 2: " Gente! gente! all'armi! all'armi!" (Conte, tutti)

== Personnel ==
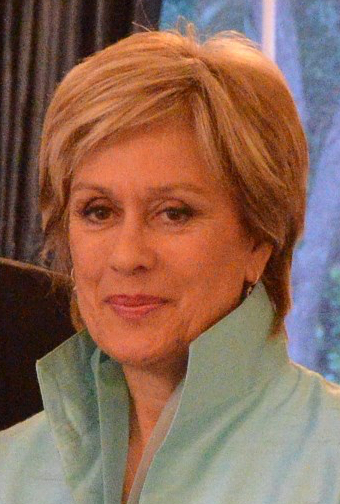
Dame Kiri Te Kanawa

=== Musical ===
- Sir Thomas Allen (baritone), Count Almaviva
- Dame Kiri Te Kanawa (soprano), Countess Almaviva
- Lucia Popp (1939-1993, soprano), Susanna
- Samuel Ramey (baritone), Figaro
- Frederica von Stade (mezzo-soprano), Cherubino
- Jane Berbié (mezzo-soprano), Marcellina
- Kurt Moll (1938-2017, bass), Doctor Bartolo
- Robert Tear (1939-2011, tenor), Don Basilio
- Philip Langridge (1939-2010, tenor), Don Curzio
- Yvonne Kenny (soprano), Barbarina
- Giorgio Tadeo (bass), Antonio
- Lynda Russell (soprano), girl
- Anne Mason (soprano), girl
- Sir Jeffrey Tate (1943-2017), harpsichord
- London Opera Chorus
- London Philharmonic Orchestra
- Sir Georg Solti (1912-1997), conductor

=== Other ===
- Christopher Raeburn (1928-2009), producer
- Michael Haas, assistant producer
- John Dunkerley, engineer
- Colin Moorfoot, engineer

== See also ==
- Le nozze di Figaro (Kleiber Recording)
- Le nozze di Figaro (Giulini 1959 recording)
