= Le nozze di Figaro (Giulini 1959 recording) =

EMI studio album by Carlo Maria Giulini

- 2013 reissue cover

Studio album by Carlo Maria Giulini
- Released: 1961
- Studio: Kingsway Hall, Holborn, London
- Genre: Opera
- Length: 153:06
- Language: Italian
- Label: EMI; Angel
- Producer: Walter Legge

Le nozze di Figaro is a 1959 EMI studio recording of Mozart's opera of the same name with the Philharmonia Orchestra and Chorus under Carlo Maria Giulini. The cast includes Elisabeth Schwarzkopf as the Countess, Anna Moffo as Susanna, Eberhard Wächter as the Count, Giuseppe Taddei as Figaro and Fiorenza Cossotto as Cherubino. The recording, made at Kingsway Hall, London, was first released on EMI in 1961 with Walter Legge as producer.

Critics have praised the richness, beauty, timing, dramatic effect, vocal texture, clarity and detail of the recording and noted the superior cast. The recording was nominated for a Grammy Award for Best Opera Recording in 1962. Since its first release, the recording has remained a popular classic in the gramophone catalog. Due to its popularity, EMI has rereleased the album several times, but the transfer to two CDs that interrupted the longest uninterrupted piece of music Mozart ever wrote, the 20-minute finale of act 2, met some criticism, as did the omission of the arias for Marcellina and Basilio in Act 4.

== Background ==
During the 1950s, Giulini served as the music director of La Scala for several years and made recordings of works of various Baroque and Romantic composers, including Verdi’s La traviata with Renata Tebaldi in 1952 (Milan RAI) and Maria Callas in 1955 (La Scala). Under his baton, several recordings were released with EMI Columbia Records and the Philharmonia Orchestra. By the end of the 1950s, Giulini had established himself as a conductor of grand opera. Giulini’s 1959 recording of Don Giovanni received widespread critical acclaim and remains the classic reference recording for the opera.

== Track listing ==
CD 1 (7 63267 2)

- 1-1 "Overture"

Act 1

- 1-2 "Cinque... dieci... venti"
- 1-3 "Se a caso madama"
- 1-4 "Or bene; ascolta e taci"
- 1-5 "Se vuol ballare"
- 1-6 "Ed aspettaste il giorno"
- 1-7 "La vendetta, oh, la vendetta"
- 1-8 "Tutto ancor non ho perso"
- 1-9 "Via resti servita, Madama brillante"
- 1-10 "Va là, vecchia pedante"
- 1-11 "Non so più cosa son, cosa faccio"
- 1-12 "Ah, son perduto!"
- 1-13 "Cosa sento!"
- 1-14 "Basilio, in traccia tosto di Figaro volate"
- 1-15 "Giovani liete, fiori spargete"
- 1-16 "Cos'è questa commedia"
- 1-17 "Evviva!... Evviva!"
- 1-18 "Non più andrai farfallone amoroso"

Act 2

- 1-19 "Porgi, amor"
- 1-20 "Vieni, cara Susanna"
- 1-21 "Quanto duolmi, Susanna"
- 1-22 "Voi, che sapete che cosa è amor"
- 1-23 "Bravo! che bella voce!"
- 1-24 "Venite, inginocchiatevi"
- 1-25 "Quante buffonerie!"
- 1-26 "Che novità!"
- 1-27 "Susanna, or via sortite"
- 1-28 "Dunque voi non aprite?"
- 1-29 "Aprite, presto aprite"
- 1-30 "Tutto è come il lasciai"
- 1-31 "Esci ormai, garzon malnato"
- 1-32 "Signore! cos'è quel stupore?"

CD 2 (7 63268 2)

- 2-1 "Conoscete, signor Figaro"
- 2-2 "Voi, signor, che giusto siete"

Act 3

- 2-3 "Che imbarazzo è mai questo"
- 2-4 "Crudel! perchè finora farmi languir così?"
- 2-5 "E perchè fosti meco"
- 2-6 "Hai già vinta la causa!"
- 2-7 "E' decisa la lite"
- 2-8 "Riconosci in quest'amplesso"
- 2-9 "Eccovi, o caro amico"
- 2-10 "E Susanna non vien? ... Dove sono"
- 2-11 "Io vi dico, signor"
- 2-12 "Canzonetta sull'aria..."
- 2-13 "Ricevete, oh padroncina"
- 2-14 "Amanti constanti"

Act 4

- 2-15 "L'ho perduta... me meschina!"
- 2-16 "Tutto è disposto"
- 2-17 "Signora! ella mi disse..."
- 2-18 "Giunse alfin il momento"
- 2-19 "Perfida! e in quella forma meco mentia?"
- 2-20 "Pian, pianin, le andrà più presso"
- 2-21 "Tutto è tranquillo e placido"
- 2-22 "Pace, pace, mio dolce tesoro"
- 2-23 "Gente, gente, all'armi, all'armi!"

== Personnel ==
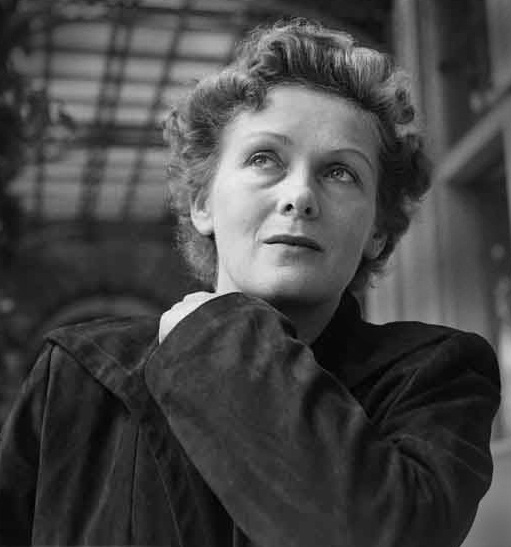
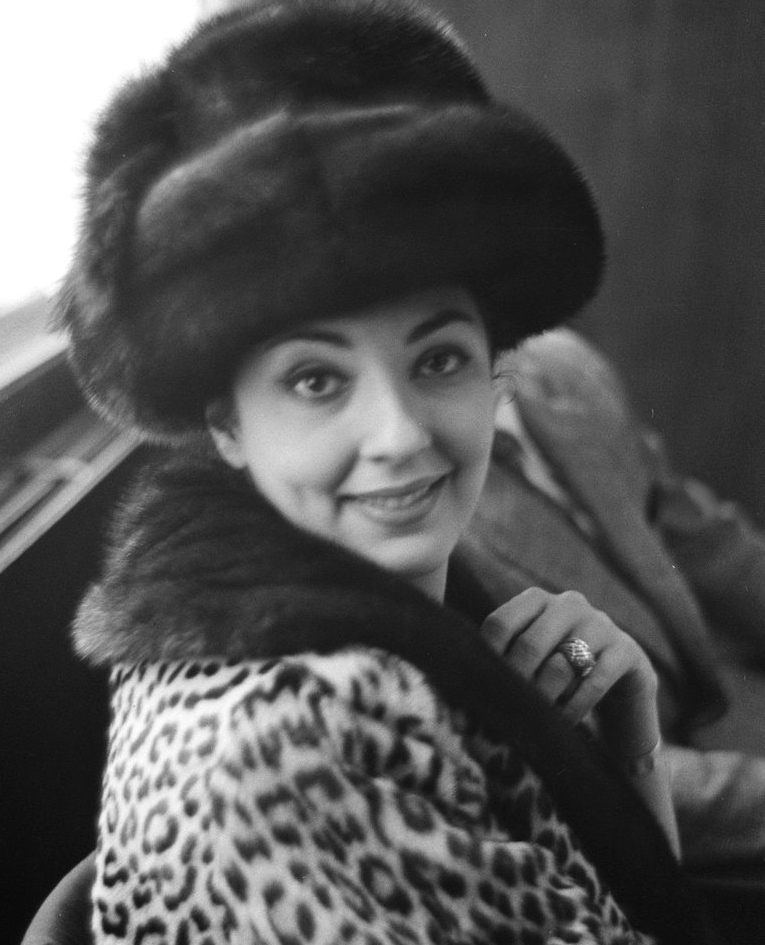
Both Elisabeth Schwarzkopf (top) and Anna Moffo (bottom) were at the peak of their careers, when this recording was made.

=== Musical ===
- Carlo Maria Giulini – conductor
- Philharmonia Orchestra – orchestra
- Philharmonia Chorus – chorus
- Roberto Benaglio – chorus master
- Elisabeth Schwarzkopf (soprano) – Countess Almaviva
- Anna Moffo (soprano) – Susanna
- Fiorenza Cossotto (mezzo-soprano) – Cherubino
- Eberhard Wächter (baritone) – Count Almaviva
- Giuseppe Taddei (baritone) – Figaro
- Piero Cappuccilli (baritone) – Antonio
- Ivo Vinco (bass) – Bartolo
- Elisabetta Fusco (soprano) – Barberina
- Dora Gatta (soprano) – Marcellina
- Renato Ercolani (tenor) – Don Basilio / Don Curzio
- Diana Gillingham, Gillian Spencer – young girl
- Heinrich Schmidt – harpsichord

=== Other ===
- Walter Legge – producer, art director
- Douglas Larter – engineer
- William Mann – liner notes
- William R. Gann – liner notes and libretto translation

== See also ==
- Le Nozze di Figaro (Kleiber Recording)
- Le nozze di Figaro (Georg Solti Recording)
