= Lisa Della Casa =

Swiss soprano

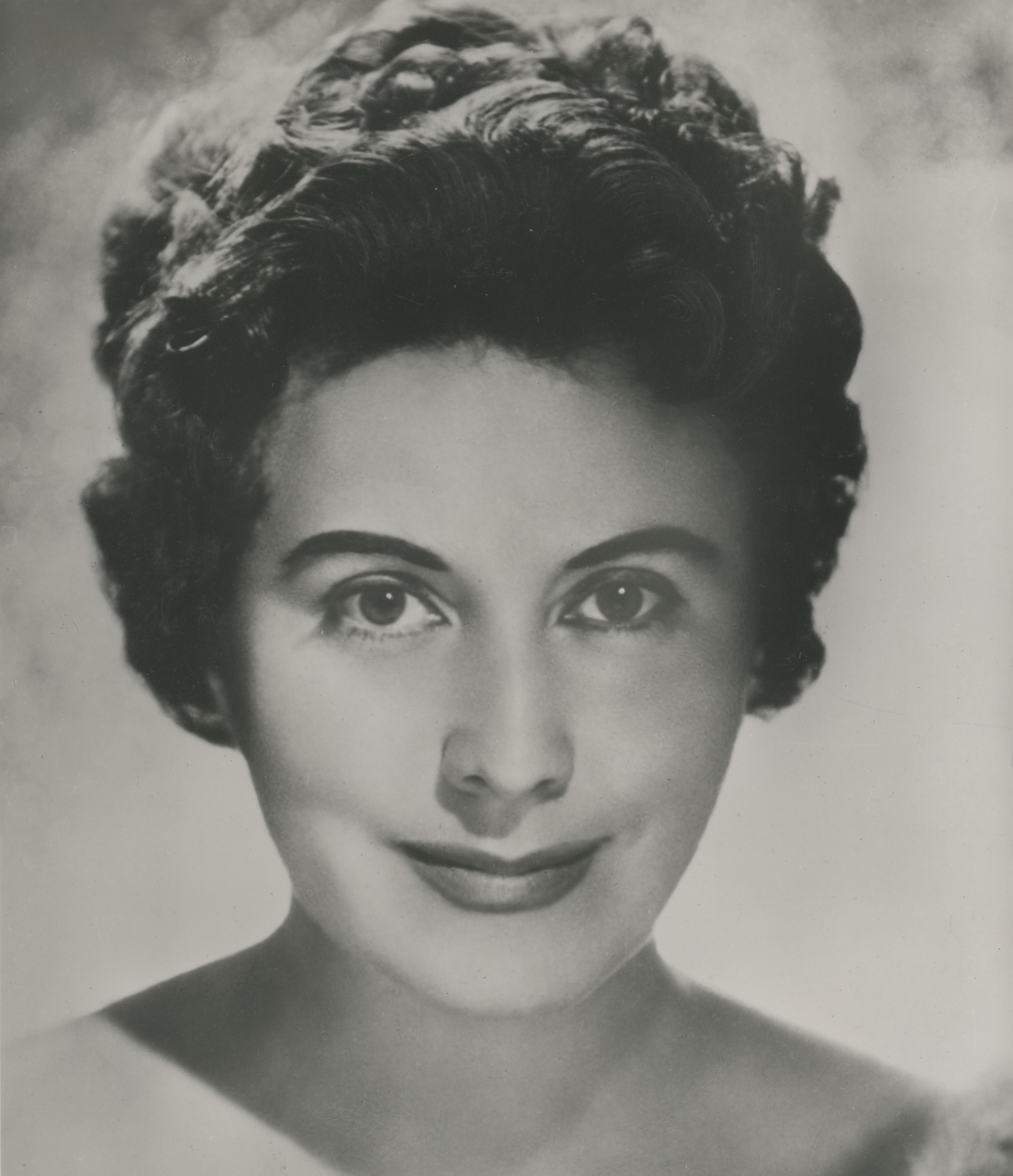
- Born: 2 February 1919; Burgdorf, Switzerland
- Died: 10 December 2012 (aged 93); Münsterlingen, Switzerland
- Occupation: Soprano singer
- Years active: 1940–1974
- Organisation(s): Zürich Opera House; Vienna State Opera
- Spouses: Ernst Geiser (m. 1944; div. 1949) Dragan Debeljevic (m. 1949)

Lisa Della Casa (2 February 1919 – 10 December 2012) was a Swiss soprano most admired for her interpretations of major heroines in operas by Wolfgang Amadeus Mozart and Richard Strauss, and of German lieder. She was also described as “the most beautiful woman on the operatic stage”.

== Life and career ==
=== Early years ===
Della Casa was born in Burgdorf, Switzerland to an Italian-Swiss father, Francesco Della Casa, and a German mother, Margarete Mueller. She began studying singing at the age of 15 at the Zurich Conservatory, and her teachers included Margarete Haeser.

She made her operatic debut in the title role of Puccini's Madama Butterfly at Solothurn-Biel Municipal Theater in 1940. She joined the ensemble of Zurich Municipal Opera House in 1943 (staying there until 1950) and sang various parts, from the Queen of the Night in Mozart's The Magic Flute to Dorabella in Così fan tutte. Later she sang Fiordiligi. She sang the part of Zdenka in the performance of Richard Strauss's Arabella at Zurich Municipal Opera House alongside Maria Cebotari's Arabella in 1946. Cebotari recognized her talent and introduced her at the Salzburg Festival in 1947, where she sang Zdenka again in a production starring Maria Reining and Hans Hotter. After the premiere performance, Strauss himself commented, "The little Della Casa will one day be Arabella!" ("Die Kleine Della Casa wird eines Tages Arabella sein!"). That same year on 18 October, she made her debut at the Vienna State Opera House, singing the part of Nedda in Leoncavallo's Pagliacci. Soon she moved to Vienna and joined the ensemble of the Vienna State Opera House. In 1949, she made her debut at La Scala in Milan as Sophie in Strauss's Der Rosenkavalier and Marzelline in Beethoven's Fidelio. Victor de Sabata, the musical director of La Scala at that time, tried to persuade her to move to La Scala, but she chose to remain in Vienna.

In 1944, she married Ernst Geiser from Langenthal. After the divorce in 1949, she married Yugoslavian-born journalist and violinist Dragan Debeljevic (1921-2014), with whom she had a daughter, Vesna.

=== Mid-career ===
Della Casa made her British debut singing the part of Countess Almaviva in Mozart's The Marriage of Figaro at the Glyndebourne Festival. She went on to sing the title role in Arabella for the first time, at the Bavarian State Opera House in Munich in 1951. It became her signature role. She sang Eva in Wagner's Die Meistersinger von Nürnberg at the Bayreuth Festival in 1952, in what proved to be her only appearance at Bayreuth.

In 1953, Della Casa sang Arabella in the Bavarian State Opera Company's performances at the London Royal Opera House, and sang the part of Octavian in Der Rosenkavalier for the first time, at the Salzburg Festival. On 20 November 1953, she made her debut at the Metropolitan Opera House in New York (the Met) as the Countess Almaviva in The Marriage of Figaro. Since her debut, she sang a total of 173 complete opera performances at the Met until her last performance there on 9 December 1967 as Countess Almaviva. Her repertoire at the Met was as follows:

- The Marriage of Figaro: Countess Almaviva (47 performances)
- Don Giovanni: Donna Elvira (34 performances)
- Die Meistersinger von Nürnberg: Eva (23 performances)
- Der Rosenkavalier: Die Feldmarschallin (17 performances) and Octavian (8 performances)
- Der Zigeunerbaron: Saffi (17 performances)
- Arabella: Arabella (16 performances)
- Ariadne auf Naxos: Ariadne (4 performances)
- Lohengrin: Elsa (4 performances)
- Madama Butterfly: Cio-Cio-San (2 performances)
- La bohème: Mimì (1 performance)

In 1955, she sang the part of the Marschallin in Richard Strauss's Der Rosenkavalier for the first time; this was in a series of performances to celebrate the opening of the restored Vienna State Opera House. As a result, she had sung all three parts - the Marschallin, Octavian, Sophie - in Der Rosenkavalier as well as a single performance as Annina replacing an indisposed singer in Zurich. The Salzburg Festival was one of the most important venues in her career. She sang Ariadne in Strauss's Ariadne auf Naxos and Donna Elvira in Mozart's Don Giovanni in 1954, (once again) Donna Elvira in 1956, Chrysothemis in Strauss's Elektra and Countess Almaviva in 1957 (she also gave a recital at the Festival in the same year which has been preserved as a recording) and Arabella in 1958. Colleague Inge Borkh stated emphatically: "She was THE Arabella!" ("Sie war DIE Arabella!)"

Della Casa sang Pamina in The Magic Flute in 1959. On 26 July 1960, the newly built Großes Festspielhaus in Salzburg opened with a performance of Der Rosenkavalier under Herbert von Karajan. She sang the part of the Marschallin in this performance with Sena Jurinac as Octavian and Hilde Güden as Sophie. Originally, Karajan and film director Paul Czinner planned to make a film of the performance and asked her to perform her role in the film, which she gladly accepted. But due to Walter Legge, well-known recording producer of EMI and husband of Dame Elisabeth Schwarzkopf, Della Casa was replaced by Schwarzkopf for the film (a reverse of the 1954 Salzburg Festival production of Mozart's Don Giovanni, where Schwarzkopf sang in the performances, but was replaced by Della Casa for the film production). Shocked, although she sang the scheduled performances of the season (the Marschallin and Countess Almaviva in The Marriage of Figaro), she would never sing there again. When asked several times subsequently to do so, she declined, replying: "No, sir, Salzburg für mich ist gestorben." ("No, sir, for me, Salzburg is dead.")

She surprised her audiences by singing the title role in Salome at the Bavarian State Opera House in Munich in 1961. Colleague Inge Borkh said that Della Casa was "very sexy ... because she did not seek to be so!" ("Sie war sehr sexy... unbewusst!")

From this time onward, she took few dramatic parts in Italian operas, succeeding notably as Desdemona in Verdi's Otello and the title role in Puccini's Tosca, but finally returned to lyric parts in Mozart and Richard Strauss operas. In 1964, when Elisabeth Schwarzkopf (now both her colleague and rival at the Vienna State Opera House) made her debut at the Metropolitan Opera of New York as the Marschallin in Der Rosenkavalier, Della Casa sang Octavian. Anneliese Rothenberger and Rolf Gerard attested that, contrary to Bing's and the public's desire for scandal, no hard feelings between the two sopranos were apparent during this period. Gerard, who was working at the time with famous Met director Rudolf Bing, called the latter a "publicity genius". Other significant roles were Cleopatra in Handel's [Julius Caesar], the Countess in Strauss's Capriccio, Ilia in Mozart's Idomeneo, and the female roles in Gottfried von Einem's Der Prozess.

=== Later years ===
Della Casa admitted she did not like the "music business", with its intrigues and vanities. Dietrich Fischer-Dieskau said of her that after hearing a performance he was astonished and wanted to congratulate her, but she was still so involved in her role that she never heard his compliments. She smoked during her career, with defiance: "Why not?" ("Warum nicht?") In a 1963 BBC television interview conducted in English, when the soprano was in mid-career, she was asked if smoking were not bad for her health. She replied: "You know, while in Vienna, I went to a special singers' doctor [who told me] 'it is the singing which is more dangerous than the smoking', and I smoke longer than I sing."

In the mid-1960s, her taste for the operatic stage began to decline and she gave fewer performances. In 1970, her daughter Vesna Debeljevic, then 20 years old, suffered an aneurysm, after which Della Casa began to limit her engagements. Vesna had surgery and survived the operation, but with complications. Della Casa devoted more time to her daughter's recovery, even buying a house in Spain where the family could gather undisturbed most of the year, and gave fewer and fewer performances until her final performance at the Wiener Staatsoper, as Arabella on 25 October 1973. In 1974, she announced her retirement, aged 55. She was considered to have been at the height of her career and left her fans bewildered: "no explanations, no comeback, no masterclasses, no interviews, no private appearances". Vesna spoke movingly of her mother's "unceasing, limitless love" ("eine Liebe ohne Ende").

Della Casa died on 10 December 2012 in Münsterlingen, Switzerland. The Große Festspielhaus flew a black flag on news of her death.

== Legacy ==
Della Casa made several complete opera recordings mainly for the Decca label: her interpretations of Countess Almaviva in The Marriage of Figaro (Erich Kleiber) and the title role in Arabella (by Sir Georg Solti) are regarded as among the finest recorded. For more information on the Figaro recording, see Le nozze di Figaro (Kleiber recording). She made the first commercial recording of Richard Strauss's Four Last Songs (Karl Böhm) in 1953 for Decca, and many classical music lovers claim this recording to be the greatest available. Her Elvira, sung to perhaps the greatest Don Giovanni of his time, Cesare Siepi, is available both on CD and DVD. She recorded a memorable Countess under the direction of Erich Leinsdorf at the Met, starring the American bass-baritone Giorgio Tozzi in the title role.

As an interpreter of lieder, she often performed with the German pianist Sebastian Peschko and Hungarian Árpád Sándor. She made several appearances in the acclaimed US television edition of the Bell Telephone Hour and appeared regularly on Swiss television, giving interviews and performances, as well as participating in game shows. In October 2007 and November 2008, Della Casa, members of her family and her colleagues agreed to be interviewed as part of a Liebe einer Diva (Loves of a Diva), a German documentary film by Thomas Voigt and Wolfgang Wunderlich about Della Casa's life and career. The film was last shown on 5 April 2010 on 3sat and has ample footage of Della Casa's career, as well as rare television footage.

== Decorations and awards ==
- Austrian Cross of Honour for Science and Art, 1st class (1969)
- Gold Medal of the City of Vienna,
- Hans Reinhart Ring
- Golden Opera Medal
- Austrian and Bavarian Chamber Singer (Kammersängerin)
- Honorary member of the Vienna State Opera
- Commandeur of the Order of Arts and Letters (France, July 2012)

== Sources ==
- Lisa Della Casa: Liebe einer Diva, Porträt der Sopranistin, German documentary film by Thomas Voigt and Wolfgang Wunderlich, producers Bavaria Media GmbH, BBC Motion Gallery, Sony BMG Music (Germany) GmbH, Wunderlich Medien GbR, United GmbH & Co. KG, Privatarchiv Lisa Della Casa, 2008. This film is currently unavailable.
- Lisa Della Casa: Von der Arabella zur Arabellissima, by Gunna Wendt & Monika Faltermeier- Prestl, Huber, Zurich, Switzerland, 1 Oktober 2008
- Ich komm vom Theater nicht los ...: Erinnerungen und Einsichten by Inge Borkh, Books on Demand Gmbh, Stuttgart, 2002
- The Last Prima Donnas, by Lanfranco Rasponi, Alfred A Knopf, 1982; ISBN 0-394-52153-6
- Ein Leben mit LISA DELLA CASA oder "In dem Schatten ihrer Locken", by Dragan Debeljevic, Atlantis Musikbuch-Verlag Zürich, 1975; ISBN 3-7611-0474-X
