= Kurt Moll =

German operatic bass (1938–2017)

Background information
- Born: 11 April 1938; Buir, Germany
- Died: 5 March 2017 (aged 78) Cologne, Germany
- Occupation: Opera singer
- Instrument: Voice (bass)
- Years active: 1958–2006

Kurt Moll (11 April 1938 – 5 March 2017) was a German operatic bass singer who enjoyed a widely renowned international career.

His voice was notable for its range, a true basso profondo, including full, resonant low and very-low notes with relaxed vibrato; also for its unusual combination of extreme volume-capacity and a purring, contrabassoon-like timbre. (Note: According to Vladimir Miller he would have been appropriately fitted to sing Russian liturgical parts for basso profondi (Octavists)) Although he had a powerful voice and stamina adequate for the most demanding parts, he was not a thunderer, and never performed as Wagner's vocally athletic, bellowing bassos Hagen, Hans Sachs, nor Wotan. His interpretations tended to be restrained and intelligent, even in comedic roles like Osmin in Mozart's Die Entführung aus dem Serail and Baron Ochs in Strauss's Der Rosenkavalier.

== Career ==
Moll was born in Buir, near Cologne, Germany. As a child, he played the cello and hoped to become a great cellist. He sang in the school choir whose conductor encouraged him to concentrate on singing. He studied voice at the Musikhochschule Köln. He joined the Cologne Opera at age 20 and remained a member of the ensemble until 1961. He then sang for three years at the Mainz Opera and five years at the Wuppertal Opera. In 1969, he accepted an engagement with the Hamburg State Opera, and then performed in major opera houses of Europe.

He made his Bayreuth Festival debut in 1968 as the nightwatchman in Die Meistersinger von Nürnberg, and sang there for several years as Fafner in Der Ring des Nibelungen, Marke in Tristan und Isolde and Pogner in Die Meistersinger.

He made his American debut with the San Francisco Opera as Gurnemanz in Wagner's Parsifal in 1974, a role he reprised with the company in 2000. He made his debut at the Metropolitan Opera on the opening night of the 1977–78 season, appearing as the Landgrave in Wagner's Tannhäuser. He also sang there as Rocco in Beethoven's Fidelio and Sparafucile in Verdi's Rigoletto.

He made many recordings of opera, sacred music, Charpentier's Te deum H.146, Magnificat H.74 in 1990 with Neville Mariner and lieder. Moll can be heard as Ochs in seven complete recordings of Der Rosenkavalier, as Sarastro in six recordings of Mozart's Die Zauberflöte, as Marke in six sets of Wagner's Tristan und Isolde, and as the Archangel Raphael in three recordings of Haydn's Die Schöpfung. His recording for the Orfeo label of Schubert's philosophical "Lieder für Bass" set a new standard for these songs; he also recorded Schubert's song-cycle Winterreise, and an album of dramatic/heroic ballads by Carl Loewe. Besides German, Italian, and Latin, he recorded a few roles in Russian, including Pimen in Boris Godunov and the Old Convict in Lady Macbeth of Mtsensk by Shostakovich. He can be seen in many roles on commercial video, including Sarastro (twice), Osmin, the Commendatore, Bartolo, Hunding in Wagner's Die Walküre (three times), Fafner in Das Rheingold and Siegfried, in Gurnemanz in Parsifal, and Ochs (three times).

== Awards and honors ==
He won three Grammy Awards (1981, 1985, and 1989) for various opera CDs, and a Primetime Emmy Award for Outstanding Individual Achievement in Classical Music/Dance for his performance as Hunding on the PBS television series Live from the Metropolitan Opera (also known as The Metropolitan Opera Presents), in 1991. In Germany he held the prestigious title Kammersänger. Moll was Bayerischer, Hamburger und Wiener Kammersänger.

== Retirement ==
Moll retired from the stage in 2006, after singing the Nightwatchman at the Bavarian State Opera in Munich. He gave a master class in January 2011 at Carnegie Hall.

Moll lived in Cologne with his family until his death.

== Film ==
- Kurt Moll – Ein Mann, ein Bass. portrait, Germany 2000, 60 min., directed by Eckhart Schmidt, produced by Raphaela Film GmbH and Preview Release GmbH in coproduction with Bayerischer Rundfunk

== See also ==
- Mozart: Le nozze di Figaro (Georg Solti recording)
