= Hilde Güden =

Austrian opera singer (1917-1988)

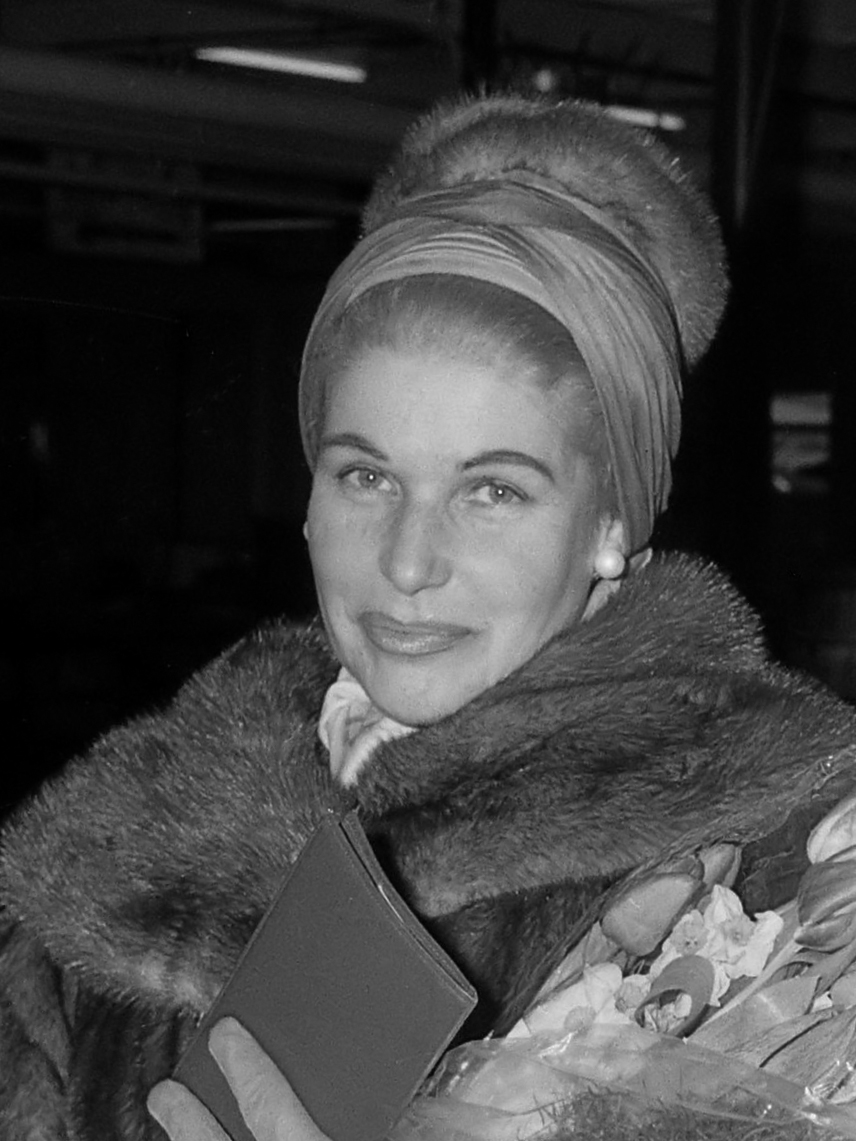
Hilde Güden in 1962

Hilde Güden (or Gueden; 15 September 1917 – 17 September 1988) was an Austrian soprano who was one of the most appreciated Straussian and Mozartian sopranos of her day. Her youthful and lively interpretations made her an ideal interpreter of roles such as Zerbinetta in Ariadne auf Naxos and Susanna in Le nozze di Figaro.

== Early life ==
Born Hulda Geiringer in Vienna, she studied singing with Otto Iro, piano with Maria Wetzelsberger, and dancing at the Vienna Music Academy. She debuted, as Hulda Gerin, in 1937 in Benatzky's operetta Herzen im Schnee at the Vienna Volksoper. Her operatic debut came in 1939, when she sang Cherubino in Le nozze di Figaro at the Zurich Opera.

In 1941, the famous conductor Clemens Krauss engaged her for the Munich State Opera, where she sang with much success. From this time she used Hilde Güden as her stage name.

== Post-war career ==
In Italy, Tullio Serafin invited her to sing Sophie (Der Rosenkavalier) in Rome and Florence. From then on, she gained great successes in Paris, Milan, London, Venice, Glyndebourne, and other major cities. She made her debut at Salzburg Festival in 1946 by singing Zerlina in Mozart's Don Giovanni in 1946. In 1947, she started a long membership with the Vienna Staatsoper, where she was still of the greatest stars up to 1973. In December 1951, she debuted at the Metropolitan Opera as Gilda in Rigoletto. In 1953, she sang Ann Trulove in the first U.S. performance of Stravinsky's The Rake's Progress at the Metropolitan Opera.

From late 1950s, she moved from light roles to lyric ones in the same operas; from Susanna to Countess Almaviva (Le nozze di Figaro), from Zerlina to Donna Elvira (Don Giovanni), from Despina to Fiordiligi (Così fan tutte), from Nannetta to Alice Ford (Falstaff), and from Musetta to Mimi (La bohème). She was also praised for her performances of Violetta in La traviata, Marguerite in Faust, and Micaëla in Carmen.

Besides her usual Mozart and Richard Strauss, she was also an operetta singer. Her Rosalinde in Die Fledermaus is considered one of her best roles. In the bel canto repertoire, she became a famous Gilda in Rigoletto and Adina in L'elisir d'amore. She was also noted for her Lieder and oratorio work.

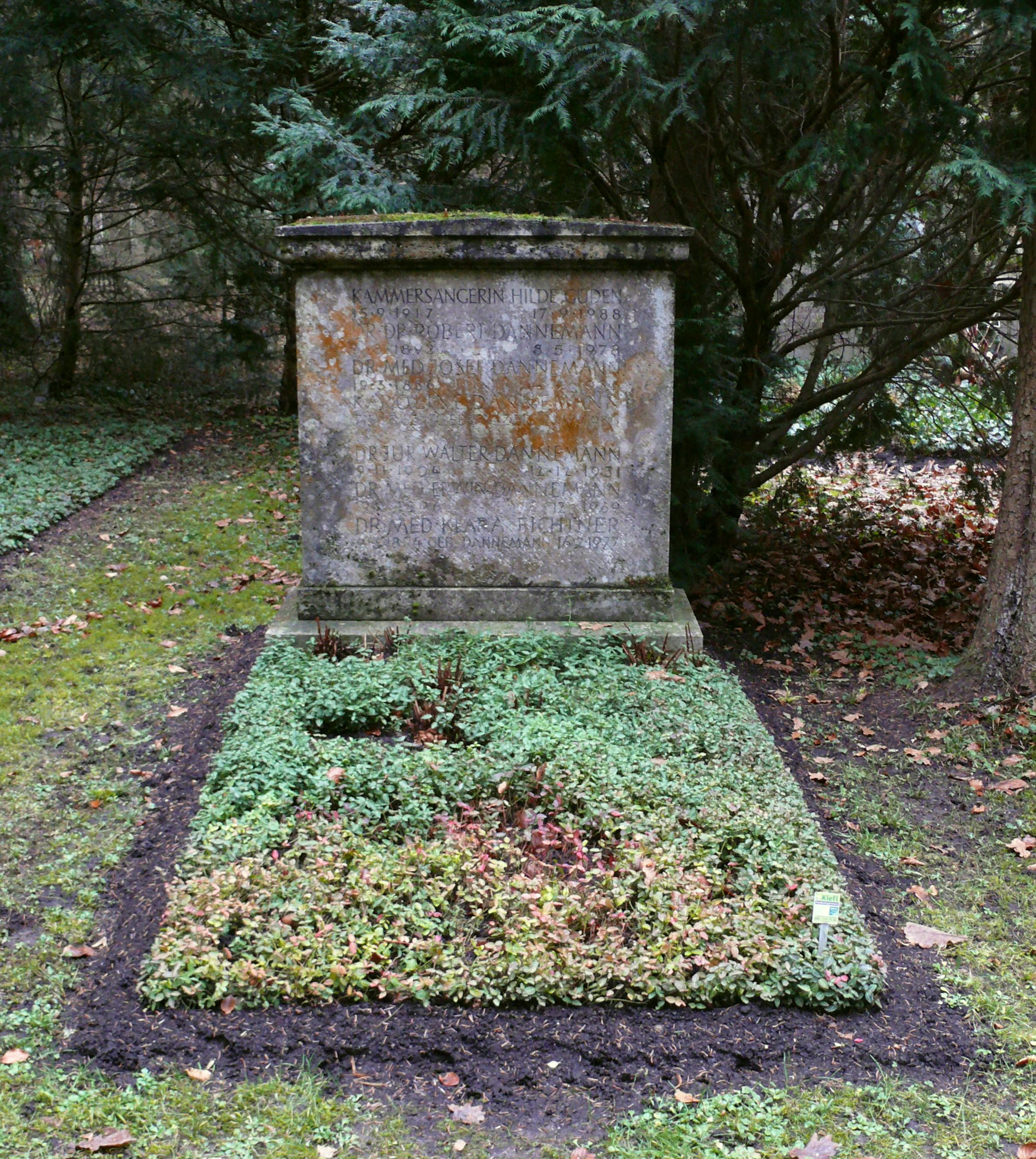
Her grave in Munich

She died, aged 71, in Klosterneuburg, and was buried in Munich 's Waldfriedhof Cemetery. (Tenor Fritz Wunderlich is also buried there.)

== Recordings ==
During the 1950s and 1960s, Hilde Güden made dozens of recordings with the best artists of her generation, especially for the Decca/London label. Following is a selection of her recorded works:

1. Mozart: Le nozze di Figaro (as Susanna) with Lisa della Casa, Cesare Siepi, and Erich Kleiber (conductor); Vienna State Opera Chorus and Vienna Philharmonic Orchestra; rec.1955 (Decca). For more details, see Le nozze di Figaro (Kleiber recording).

2. Mozart: Don Giovanni (as Zerlina) with Lisa della Casa, Cesare Siepi, Walter Berry, Suzanne Danco and Josef Krips (cond.); Chorus and Orchestra of the Vienna State Opera; rec.1955 (Decca)

3. Mozart: Die Zauberflöte (as Pamina) with Wilma Lipp, Leopold Simoneau, Kurt Boehme and Karl Böhm (cond.); Chorus and Orchestra of the Vienna State Opera; rec.1955 (Decca)

4. Johann Strauss: Die Fledermaus (as Rosalinde) with Wilma Lipp, Anton Dermota, Julius Patzak and Clemens Krauss (cond.); Chorus and Orchestra of the Vienna State Opera; rec.1950 (London Gramophone LLP 305, Decca, now only available in various "public domain" versions)

5. Johann Strauss: Die Fledermaus (as Rosalinde) with Erika Köth, Walter Berry, Regina Resnik and Herbert von Karajan (cond.); Chorus and Orchestra of the Vienna State Opera; rec.1960 (Decca)

6. Johann Strauss: Der Zigeunerbaron (as Saffi) with Karl Terkal, Walter Berry, Anneliese Rothenberger and Heinrich Hollreiser (cond.); Chorus and Orchestra of the Vienna State Opera; rec.1959 (EMI)

7. Richard Strauss: Daphne (as Daphne) with Fritz Wunderlich, James King, Paul Schoffler and Karl Böhm (cond.); Chorus and Orchestra of the Vienna State Opera; rec.1964/live (DG)

8. Richard Strauss: Der Rosenkavalier (as Sophie) with Maria Reining, Sena Jurinac and Erich Kleiber (cond.); Chorus and Orchestra of the Vienna State Opera; rec.1954 (Decca)

9. Richard Strauss: Die schweigsame Frau with Hermann Prey, Fritz Wunderlich, Hans Hotter, and Karl Böhm (cond.); Chorus and Orchestra of the Vienna State Opera; rec.1959/live-Salzburg Festival (DG)

10. Richard Strauss: Ariadne auf Naxos (as Zerbinetta) with Lisa della Casa, Irmgard Seefried, Rudolph Schock and Karl Böhm (cond.); Chorus and Orchestra of the Vienna State Opera; rec.1954/live-Salzburg Festival (DG)

11. Richard Wagner: Die Meistersinger von Nürnberg (as Eva) with Paul Schöffler, Günther Treptow, Karl Dönch, Anton Dermota and Hans Knappertsbusch (cond.); Chorus and Orchestra of the Vienna State Opera; rec.1950–51 (Decca)

12. Giacomo Puccini: La bohème (as Musetta) with Renata Tebaldi, Giacinto Prandelli, Fernando Corena and Alberto Erede (cond.); Orchestra e coro dell'Accademia di Santa Cecilia, Roma; rec.1950 (Decca)

13. Giuseppe Verdi: Rigoletto (as Gilda) with Aldo Protti, Mario Del Monaco, Cesare Siepi and Alberto Erede (cond.); Chorus and Orchestra of the Accademia di Santa Cecilia, Rome; rec.1954 (Decca)

14. Franz Lehár's ‘Giuditta Decca’ Ace of Diamond, GOS583-4, 1959, Rudolf Moralt. Vienna State Opera Orchestra and Chorus, Hilde Gueden, Waldemar Kmentt, Emmy Loose, Murray Dicek, Oskar Czerwenda, and Walter Berry

== Video ==
- As the Countess in Le nozze di Figaro, in a live performance with Dietrich Fischer-Dieskau, Geraint Evans, Graziella Sciutti, and Evelyn Lear, conducted by Lorin Maazel, from the Salzburg Festival, 1963. The DVD is published by Video Artists International, Inc. Catalog number VAI DVD 4519.
- Arias from Don Pasquale and Die Fledermaus on Golden Age of Singing, Vol. 1, published by Video Artists International, Inc. Catalog number VAI DVD 4701.
- "Vilia" from The Merry Widow on Golden Age of Singing, Vol. 2, published by Video Artists International, Inc. Catalog number VAI DVD 4702.
