= Alfred Poell =

Austrian operatic baritone

Alfred Poell (18 March 1900 – 30 January 1968) was an Austrian operatic baritone.

Poell was born in Linz, Austria and studied medicine at the University of Innsbruck and obtained his doctorate there. He practised for a time as a neck specialist. He then turned to vocal studies at the Vienna Music Academy with Philip Forsten and Joseph von Manowarda.

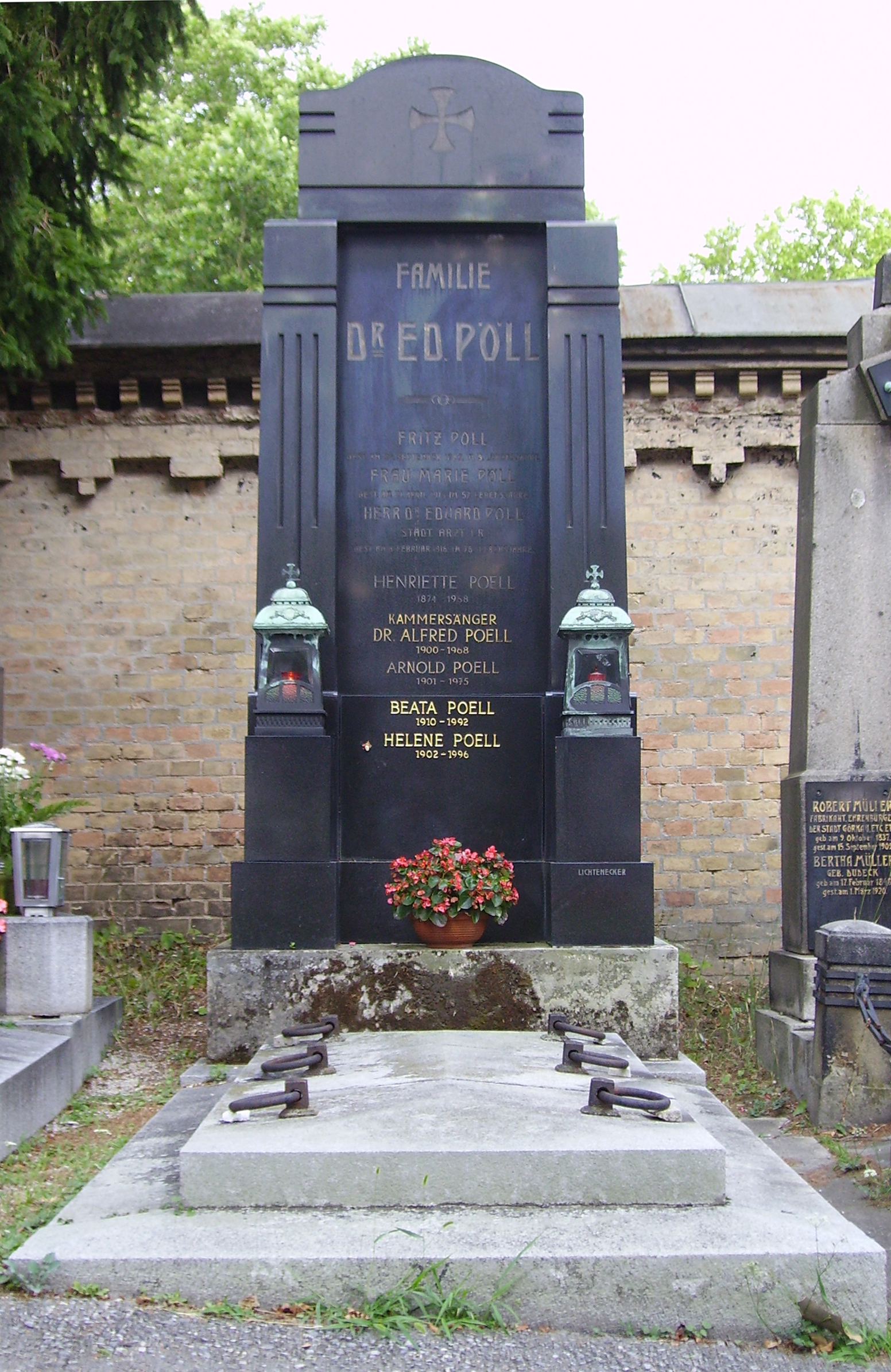
The Poell family's grave site, Vienna

He made his operatic debut at the Deutsche Oper am Rhein in Düsseldorf in 1929, where he sang for ten years and where he took part in the premiere of Ludwig Maurick's work Simplicius Simplicissimus, on 23 March 1938. He joined the Vienna State Opera in 1940, where he sang until the end of his career. He also became a regular guest at the Salzburg Festival and the Glyndebourne Festival, where he was especially admired for his Mozart singing. He made guest appearances at La Scala in Milan, the Royal Opera House in London. the Palais Garnier in Paris and other major European stages.

Besides Mozart roles, he performed in works such as Fidelio, Der Freischütz, Ariadne auf Naxos, Der Rosenkavalier, Die Frau ohne Schatten, Arabella, Die Meistersinger von Nürnberg, Götterdämmerung, Palestrina, The Rape of Lucretia, Die Fledermaus, etc.

He took part in the stage premiere of Frank Martin's Le Vin herbé at the Salzburg Festival in 1948, Strauss's Die Liebe der Danae in 1952, and Gottfried von Einem's Der Prozeß in 1953. He also enjoyed a successful career as a concert and Lieder singer.

His performance in 1950 of Bach's Mass in B minor conducted by Herbert von Karajan, alongside Elisabeth Schwarzkopf, Kathleen Ferrier, Walther Ludwig and Paul Schöffler, was recorded live.

Poell was awarded the title Kammersänger. He died in Vienna, Austria.

== See also ==
- Le nozze di Figaro (Kleiber recording)

== Sources ==
- Alfred Poell, bach-cantatas.com
- Mass in B minor BWV 232 / Conducted by Herbert von Karajan, bach-cantatas.com
