= Cesare Siepi =

Italian bass (1923–2010)

Siepi in the 1950s

Cesare Siepi (10 February 1923 – 5 July 2010) was an Italian operatic bass, generally considered to have been one of the finest basses of the post-war period. His voice was characterised by a deep, warm timbre, a full, resonant, wide-ranging lower register with relaxed vibrato, and a ringing, vibrant upper register. Although renowned as a Verdian bass, his tall, striking presence and the elegance of phrasing made him a natural for the role of Don Giovanni. He can be seen in that role on Paul Czinner's 1954 film of the opera made during an edition of the Salzburg Festival under the baton of Wilhelm Furtwängler.

== Early career ==
Born in Milan (his year of birth is debated between 1919 and 1923, though 1923 is given as official), he began singing as a member of a madrigal group. He often claimed to have been largely self-taught, having attended the music conservatory in his home city for just a short time. His operatic career was interrupted by World War II. After his debut in 1941 (in Schio, near Vicenza, as Sparafucile in Rigoletto), Siepi, an opponent of the fascist regime, fled to Switzerland.

After the end of the war his career immediately took off. Success as Zaccaria in Nabucco at La Fenice in Venice was followed by the first of many engagements at La Scala, Milan. His early engagements there were in the Verdi bass roles, the title role in Boito's Mefistofele under Arturo Toscanini, as Colline in La bohème, and in La Gioconda, La favorite, and I puritani.

== International success ==
Siepi debuted abroad in 1947, at the Liceu in Barcelona in Donizetti's Anna Bolena, but his international reputation was established in 1950, when Sir Rudolf Bing brought him to the Metropolitan Opera in New York to open the 1950 season as King Philip II in Don Carlos. He was to remain principal bass at the Met until 1974, adding roles such as Boris Godunov (in English) and Gurnemanz in Parsifal (in German), and singing all the major roles of the bass repertoire.

His debut at the Royal Opera House, Covent Garden, was in 1950, and he appeared there regularly until the mid-1970s.

In 1953, Siepi debuted at the Salzburg Festival with a legendary production of Don Giovanni conducted by Wilhelm Furtwängler, staged by Herbert Graf, and designed by Clemens Holzmeister. He made an immediate impact in the title role of the opera, which became perhaps his best known role, as it had been for the most famous Italian bass of the generation before, Ezio Pinza. This performance has been released on CD, and a 1954 mounting of this production was filmed in color and released in 1955.

Siepi was a frequent guest at the Vienna State Opera. In 43 performances he sang Don Giovanni, more often than any other singer in modern times except for Eberhard Wächter. In 1967 Siepi was Don Giovanni in a controversially received production staged by Otto Schenk and designed by Luciano Damiani that showed Mozart's masterpiece in the light of the commedia dell'arte, emphasizing the comic and ironic elements of this opera (conductor Josef Krips strongly opposed this production's concept). In Vienna he also sang Basilio (Il barbiere di Siviglia), Colline (La bohème), Fiesco (Simon Boccanegra), Figaro (Le nozze di Figaro), Padre Guardiano (La forza del destino 1974 in a new production conducted by Riccardo Muti), Gurnemanz (Parsifal), Méphistophélès (Faust), Filippo II (Don Carlos), and Ramphis (Aida). His final performance at Vienna was in Norma (Oroveso) at the Austria Center Vienna in 1994.

He performed as recital artist in Community Concerts under Columbia Artist Management, and was known as an interpreter of German Lieder. He married Met ballerina Louellen Sibley and they had two children.

Siepi enjoyed a long career, and performed regularly until the 1980s, including lead roles in the ill-fated Broadway musicals Bravo Giovanni and Carmelina. In addition to his studio recordings, there are also many live recordings of performances of his major roles.

Siepi's formal farewell to the operatic stage occurred at the Teatro Carani in Sassuolo on 21 April 1989. Indeed, Capon's List shows live recordings made as late as 1988.

Siepi's last studio recording was as the old King Archibaldo in RCA's 1976 taping of Italo Montemezzi's L'amore dei tre re, with Anna Moffo and Plácido Domingo in the cast.

Siepi died at Piedmont Hospital in Atlanta, Georgia, on 5 July 2010, after suffering a stroke more than a week earlier. He was 87.

== Repertoire ==
Operatic roles
Role	Opera	Composer
Conte Rodolfo	La sonnambula	Bellini
Oroveso	Norma	Bellini
Sir Giorgio	I Puritani	Bellini
Mefistofele	Mefistofele	Boito
Enrico VIII	Anna Bolena	Donizetti
Raimondo Bidebent	Lucia di Lammermoor	Donizetti
Marin Faliero	Marin Faliero	Donizetti
Baldassarre	La Favorita	Donizetti
Méphistophélès	Faust	Gounod
Le Cardinal de Brogni	La Juive	Halévy
Giulio Cesare	Giulio Cesare in Egitto	Handel
Marcel	Les Huguenots	Meyerbeer
Archibaldo	L'amore dei tre re	Montemezzi
Figaro	Le nozze di Figaro	Mozart
Don Giovanni; Leporello	Don Giovanni	Mozart
Sarastro	The Magic Flute	Mozart
Boris Godunov	Boris Godunov	Mussorgsky
Dosifei	Khovanshchina	Mussorgsky
Alvise Badoero	La Gioconda	Ponchielli
Colline	La bohème	Puccini
Don Basilio	The Barber of Seville	Rossini
Mosè	Mosè	Rossini
Il vecchio ebreo	Sansone e Dalila	Saint-Saëns
Lothario	Mignon	Thomas
Zaccaria	Nabucco	Verdi
Don Ruy Gomez de Silva	Ernani	Verdi
Attila	Attila	Verdi
Roger	Jérusalem	Verdi
Sparafucile	Rigoletto	Verdi
Giovanni da Procida	I vespri siciliani	Verdi
Jacopo Fiesco	Simon Boccanegra	Verdi
Padre Guardiano	La forza del destino	Verdi
Filippo II; Grande Inquisitore	Don Carlo	Verdi
Ramfis	Aida	Verdi
Pistola	Falstaff	Verdi
Pogner	Die Meistersinger von Nürnberg	Wagner
Gurnemanz	Parsifal	Wagner

== Videography ==
- Mozart: Don Giovanni (Grümmer, della Casa, Berger, Dermota, Edelmann; Furtwängler, Graf, 1954) VAI
- "Six Great Basses" [aria from Don Carlos, 1970] Bel Canto Society

== See also ==
- Le nozze di Figaro (Kleiber recording)
