= Non più andrai =

Aria in Mozart's The Marriage of Figaro

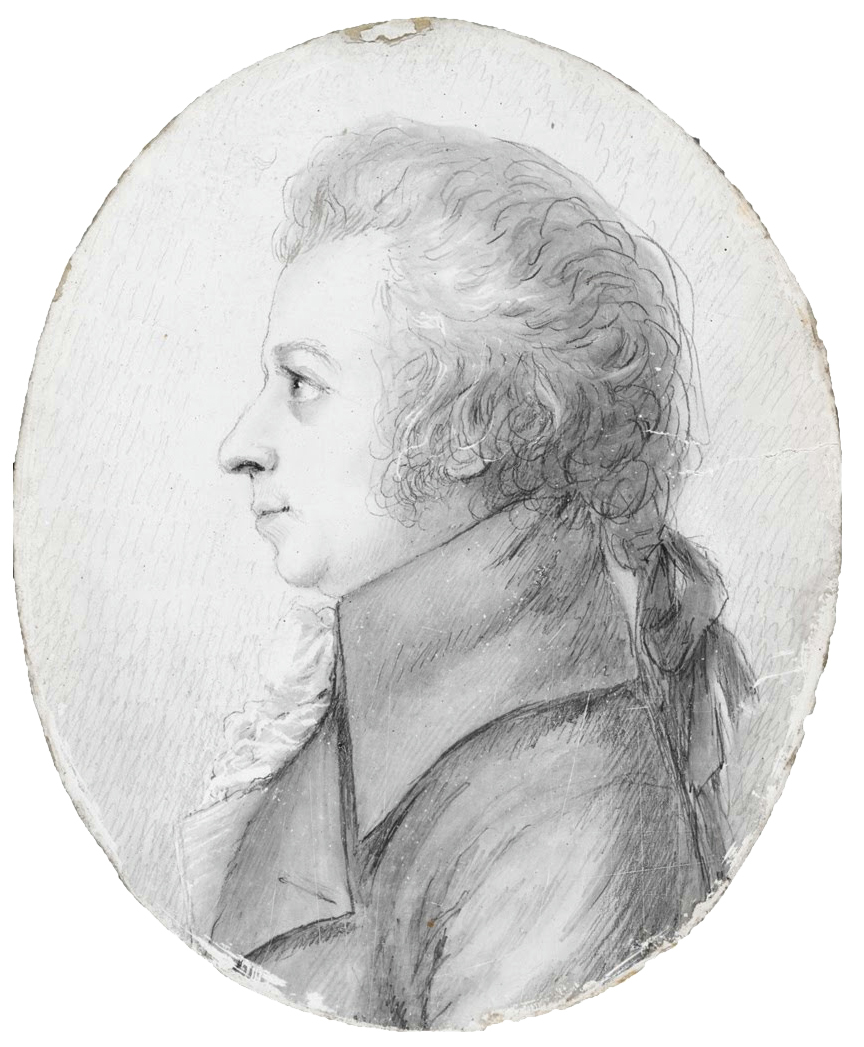
Stock's 1789 miniature of Mozart

"Non più andrai"
Performed by Renato Capecchi, 1961

"Non più andrai" (You shall go no more) is an aria for bass from Mozart's 1786 opera The Marriage of Figaro, K. 492. The Italian libretto was written by Lorenzo Da Ponte based on a stage comedy by Pierre Beaumarchais, La folle journée, ou le Mariage de Figaro (1784). It is sung by Figaro at the end of the first act.

== Context ==
At the end of the first act, Count Almaviva finds Cherubino hiding in Susanna's quarters. The Count was already suspicious that Cherubino had designs on his wife, Countess Rosina, and overall disapproves of his loose lifestyle. However, he cannot punish Cherubino, as he himself was only in Susanna's quarters to proposition her. The Count sends Cherubino away instead, to his regiment in Seville. In this aria, Figaro teases Cherubino about his Spartan military future, in stark contrast with the pleasant and flirtatious life he has enjoyed in the Count's palace.

== Libretto ==
The libretto of Le nozze di Figaro was written by librettist Lorenzo Da Ponte, who collaborated with Mozart on two other operas, Così fan tutte and Don Giovanni.

Non più andrai, farfallone amoroso,
notte e giorno d'intorno girando;
delle belle turbando il riposo
Narcisetto, Adoncino d'amor.

Non più avrai questi bei pennacchini,
quel cappello leggero e galante,
quella chioma, quell'aria brillante,
quel vermiglio donnesco color.

Tra guerrieri, poffar Bacco!
Gran mustacchi, stretto sacco.
Schioppo in spalla, sciabla al fianco,
collo dritto, muso franco,
un gran casco, o un gran turbante,
molto onor, poco contante!
Ed invece del fandango,
una marcia per il fango.

Per montagne, per valloni,
con le nevi e i sollioni.
Al concerto di tromboni,
di bombarde, di cannoni,
che le palle in tutti i tuoni
all'orecchio fan fischiar.
Cherubino alla vittoria:
alla gloria militar!

You shall go no more, lustful butterfly,
Day and night flitting to and fro;
Disturbing ladies in their sleep
Little Narcissus, Adonis of love.

No longer will you have these beautiful feathers,
That light, romantic cap,
That hair, that glowing countenance,
That rosy, womanly complexion.

Among soldiers, by Jove!
A big moustache, a little kit.
With a rifle on your shoulder, and a sabre on your flank,
Standing up straight, hard faced,
A big helmet, or a big turban,
Plenty of honour, little pay!
And instead of dancing the fandango,
A march through the mud.

Through mountains, through valleys,
With snow and with the sun beating down.
To the beat of the bugle,
Of bombs, of cannons,
Whose thunderous report
Makes your ears ring.
Cherubino, to victory:
To glory in battle!

The meter of the verse is anapestic trimeter for the first two stanzas, trochaic tetrameter for the remainder. The intricate rhyme scheme is [ABAC] [DEEC] [FF GG HH II] [JJJJJK LK], where the long series of -oni rhymes ([J]) supports the patter song describing the soldier's miseries.

== Music ==
The aria is set in C major, in common time and is in the style of a military march. It is 114 bars long and takes about four minutes to perform. Its vocal range and tessitura covers C_{3} to E_{4}. The melody often mimics the sound of a military bugle by concentrating on the natural harmonics (C–E–G–C). This effect is strengthened when horns are prominent several times in the orchestra. The final 14 bars are played entirely by the orchestra as the characters (in productions respecting the original stage direction Partono tutti alla militare) march off the stage in military fashion.

== Reception ==
The catchy tune and stirring military accompaniment have made this aria popular from the very beginning; indeed at the rehearsals of the premiere the performers burst spontaneously into bravos for the composer (for details see article on Francesco Benucci, who created the role). Mozart later quoted his own tune, played by a stage band as part of a medley sequence, in his opera Don Giovanni (1787) – evidently aware that the audience would instantly recognize it (the character Leporello, in Don Giovanni's Vienna premiere also sung by Benucci, ironically sings, Questa poi la conosco pur troppo – "Now that tune I know too well"). Mozart further reused this aria in the first of his Five Contredanses, K. 609 (1791).

Harris calls "Non più andrai" "the most famous aria in the opera", continuing: "this is simply a great tune, a great comic piece ... Mozart at his most playful and entertaining."

The march was formerly the ceremonial march of the Fanagoriysky Grenadier Regiment of the Imperial Russian Army. The march is currently the regimental slow march of the Coldstream Guards in the United Kingdom and the Governor General's Foot Guards in Canada. It is also the march of St John Ambulance in England.
