= Se vuol ballare =

Aria from Mozart's 1786 opera "The Marriage of Figaro"

"Se vuol ballare"
Performed by Renato Capecchi, 1961

The cavatina "Se vuol ballare" is an aria for Figaro from the first act of the opera The Marriage of Figaro by Wolfgang Amadeus Mozart. The libretto was written by Lorenzo Da Ponte based on a stage comedy by Pierre Beaumarchais, La folle journée, ou le Mariage de Figaro (1778). The Italian title means "If you want to dance". Figaro's voice type is given as bass in the score, but in modern performance practice is sung by a bass-baritone.

Susanna has told her fiancé Figaro that the count intends to exercise his newly reasserted feudal Droit du seigneur, the ius primae noctis, to sleep with her before their marriage. Figaro sings of how he will unravel the count's schemes and thwart him.

== Libretto ==
Italian
Se vuol ballare, signor contino,
se vuol ballare, signor contino,
il chitarrino le suonerò
il chitarrino le suonerò, sì,
le suonerò, sì,
le suonerò.

Se vuol venire nella mia scuola
la capriola le insegnerò,
se vuol venire nella mia scuola
la capriola le insegnerò, sì,
le insegnerò, sì,
le insegnerò.

Saprò, saprò, saprò, saprò, saprò,
ma piano, piano, piano, piano, piano, piano,
meglio ogni arcano,
dissimulando scoprir potrò.

L'arte schermendo, l'arte adoprando,
di qua pungendo, di là scherzando,
tutte le macchine rovescierò, rovescierò.
tutte le macchine rovescierò, rovescierò.

Se vuol ballare, signor contino,
se vuol ballare, signor contino,
il chitarrino le suonerò,
il chitarrino le suonerò, sì,
le suonerò, sì,
le suonerò..

Literal translation
If you want to dance, my little count,
If you want to dance, my little count,
I'll play the little guitar for you,
I'll play the little guitar for you, yes,
I'll play for you, yes,
I'll play for you.

If you want to come to my school
I'll teach you the capriole,
If you want to come to my school
I'll teach you the capriole, yes,
Teach you, yes,
Teach you.

I'll know, I'll know, I'll know, I'll know, I'll know,
but slowly, slowly, slowly, slowly, slowly, slowly, slowly;
Sooner every dark secret
by dissembling I shall uncover.

Artfully fencing, artfully working,
stinging here, joking there,
all of your schemes I'll turn inside out.
all of your schemes I'll turn inside out.

If you want to dance, my little count,
If you want to dance, my little count,
I'll play the little guitar for you,
I'll play the little guitar for you, yes,
I'll play for you, yes,
I'll play for you.

Singable translation
So, little master, you're dressed to go dancing,
dressed in your best to go strutting and prancing.
I'll put an end to your fun pretty soon;
you may go dancing but I'll call the tune, yes,
I'll call the tune, yes,
I'll call the tune.

If you want dancing, I'll be your master;
faster and faster, dance till you drop.
If you want dancing, I'll be your master;
faster and faster, dance till you drop, yes,
dance till you drop, yes,
dance till you drop.

You'll see, you'll see,
be careful, Figaro, be careful!
Stay under cover,
then you'll discover what he's about.

I will be cunning, slyly deceiving,
cutting and running, ducking and weaving.
He may be clever but he's met his match.
I can undo any scheme he can hatch.

So, little master, you're dressed to go dancing,
dressed in your best to go strutting and prancing.
I'll put an end to your fun pretty soon;
you may go dancing but I'll call the tune, yes,
I'll call the tune, yes,
I'll call the tune.

== Variations ==
Beethoven wrote a series of 12 variations for piano and violin, WoO 40, on the theme of "Se vuol ballare".
