= Dove sono =

Soprano aria from Mozart's opera "Le nozze di Figaro"

- Aria by W. A. Mozart
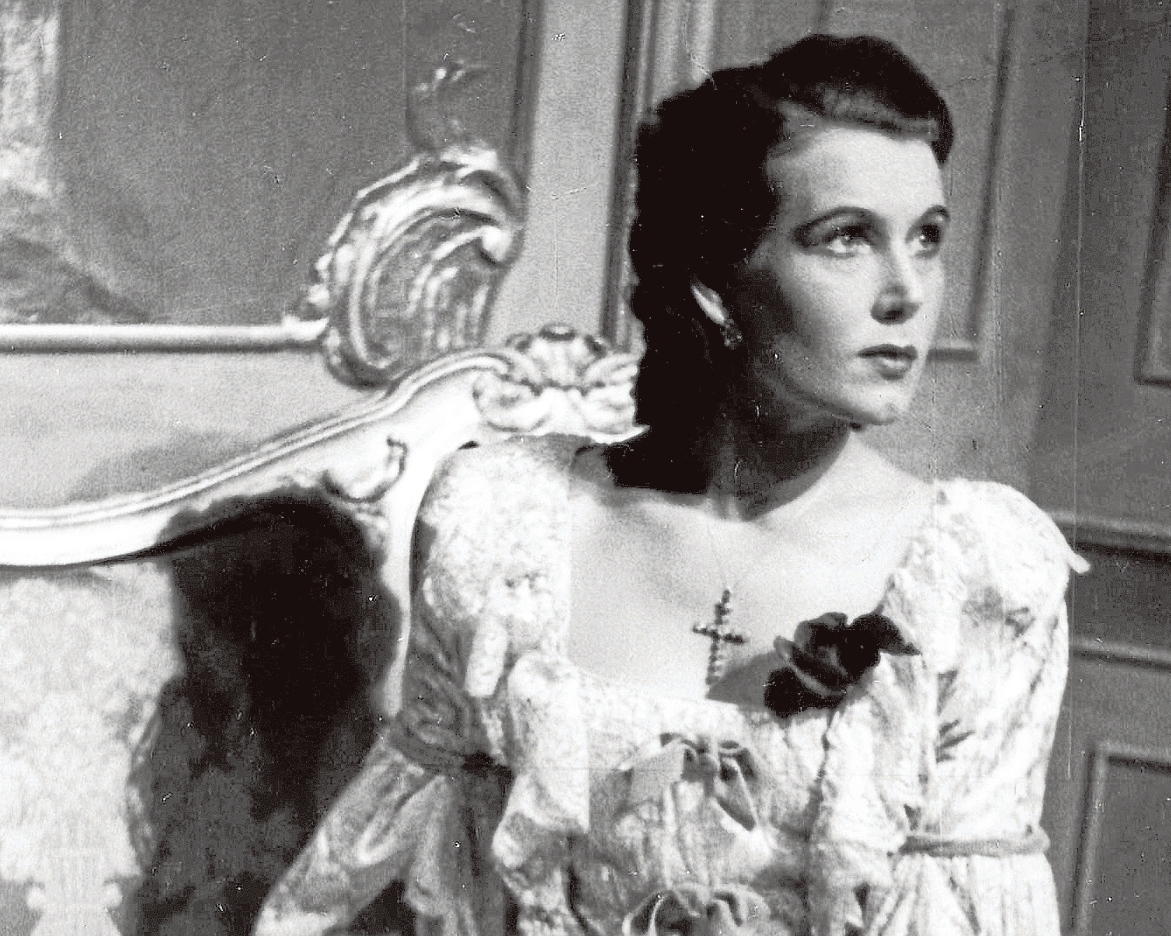
- Aulikki Rautawaara as the Countess in the 1950s
- English: Where are [those happy moments]
- Key: C major
- Related: Le nozze di Figaro
- Text: Lorenzo Da Ponte
- Language: Italian
- Composed: 1786
- "E Susanna non vien!" "Dove sono i bei momenti" Maria Stader, Deutsches Symphonie-Orchester Berlin, Ferenc Fricsay (1960)

"Dove sono" (Where are [those happy moments]) is an aria in Italian for lyric soprano from the third act of Mozart's 1786 opera Le nozze di Figaro (The Marriage of Figaro). Part of the music to the aria was "recycled" from the earlier "Agnus dei" from Mozart's Coronation Mass (1779). In this aria, Countess Almaviva laments, in an initial recitative, that her husband has become a philanderer, and that she must rely on assistance from her maid to manipulate him. In the aria, she calmly remembers moments of love, and hopes, with increasing agitation, that her persistence may make him love her again. It is frequently performed in recitals and featured in anthologies of vocal music for lyric soprano.

== Context ==
Mozart composed Le nozze di Figaro in 1786, in his first collaboration with Lorenzo Da Ponte, based on the play La folle journée, ou le Mariage de Figaro (The Mad Day, or The Marriage of Figaro) by Beaumarchais. "Dove sono" is an aria of Countess Rosina from the third act, preceded by a recitative, "E Susanna non vien!" (Susanna's not come!).

Alone on stage, the Countess regrets in the recitative that her husband, Count Almaviva, who had wooed her energetically (see: Beaumarchais' The Barber of Seville) and loved her ardently, has become an indiscriminate, overbearing philanderer; and that she must rely on assistance from her domestic staff in order to manipulate him. In the aria, she misses the tender moments of love that she remembers, and finally hopes that her persistence and fidelity may make him love her again.

In Mozart's score, the aria follows the sextet in act 3 where Figaro and his enemies (Dr. Bartolo and Marcellina) learn that he is actually their long-lost son ("Riconosci in questo amplesso"). In some performances (e.g. Gardiner 1993), it precedes the sextet and follows the Count's aria "Vedro mentr'io sospiro". Moberly and Raeburn argued in 1965 that this is a more logical order, and that the order in the score was necessary so that the singer who doubled in the roles of Bartolo and Antonio in the premiere, Francesco Bussani, could change clothes. Ian Woodfield cites Alan Tyson's inspection of the autograph retrieved in 1977 from the Jagiellonian Library in Kraków which found no hint of such a reshuffle, but concedes that the hypothesis by Moberly and Raeburn was not disproved, only uncorroborated.

== Music ==
The recitative is accompanied by strings, and the orchestra in the aria features oboes and bassoons prominently. The recitative, "E Susanna non vien! Sono ansiosa di saper come il Conte accolse la proposta" (Susanna's not come! I'm impatient to know what the Count said to her proposal.) is marked Andante. Strings move with lively motifs when she pauses.

The melody of the aria, "Dove sono i bei momenti di dolcezza e di piacer" (Where are those happy moments of sweetness and pleasure?) begins similarly to the Agnus Dei from Mozart's Coronation Mass, K. 317, written in 1779. While in F major and in 3/4 time in the mass, it is in C major and 2/4 time in the opera. Compared to the Countess's first aria, "Porgi amor" in act 2, the structure of "Dove sono" is more complex. The first two stanzas, in the tempo of Andante, are in A–B–A′ da capo format, sung softly, with little melodic movement, while oboes and bassoons fill her rests with expressive motifs which she later picks up. In the B-section, the music modulates to G major and G minor. The recapitulation in the A′ section has some significant changes in harmonization and orchestration. She alone begins the Allegro section of the third stanza, in common time, singing in increasing movement, and with increasing instrumental support, of her hope for a change in her husbands heart. The third stanza contains the same number of bars as the first two together. The aria concludes with an eight-bar postlude which musically resemble the introduction to "Porgi amor". Waldoff and Webster argue that "Dove sono" is musically related to the Countess's dramatic relationship with Susanna; specifically exemplified by similarities in the voice/wind instrument interaction in the Letter Duet and "Deh vieni".

== Text ==
Recitative
E Susanna non vien! Sono ansiosa
di saper come il Conte
accolse la proposta: alquanto ardito
il progetto mi par, e ad uno sposo
sì vivace e geloso...
Ma che mal c'è? Cangiando i miei vestiti
con quelli di Susanna e i suoi co' miei...
al favor della notte... Oh cielo, a qual
umil stato fatale io son ridotta
da un consorte crudel che, dopo avermi
con un misto inaudito
d'infedeltà, di gelosia, di sdegni
prima amata, indi offesa e alfin tradita,
fammi or cercar da una mia serva aita!

Aria
Dove sono i bei momenti
di dolcezza e di piacer,
dove andaro i giuramenti
di quel labbro menzogner?

Perché mai se in pianti e in pene
per me tutto si cangiò,
la memoria di quel bene
dal mio sen non trapassò?

Ah se almen la mia costanza,
nel languire amando ognor,
mi portasse una speranza
di cangiar l'ingrato cor!

And Susanna doesn't come! I'm anxious
to know how the Count
took the proposal. The scheme seems
too bold to me, and to a husband
so wild and jealous...
But what harm is there? Changing my clothes
with those of Susanna and hers with mine...
shielded by the night... oh heavens, to what
humble and dangerous state am I reduced
by a cruel husband, who, after marrying me
with an unheard of mixture
of infidelity, jealousy and disdain
first loved, then offended and at last betrayed me,
now makes me seek my maid for help!

Where are the beautiful moments
of sweetness and pleasure,
where are the promises gone
of that deceitful tongue?

Why has everything changed
into tears and pain for me,
why has the memory of that happiness
never left my breast?

Ah! If only my devotion
in longing for his love
could give me some hope
of changing that ungrateful heart!

== Usage ==
The journalist Bruce Scott considers that "Dove sono" is one of the best known and most loved arias in the operatic repertoire. Beyond performances of the opera, it is frequently performed in recitals and featured in anthologies of vocal music for lyric soprano, often with the preceding recitative.
