= The Marriage of Figaro =

1786 opera by Wolfgang Amadeus Mozart

Le nozze di Figaro The Marriage of Figaro
- Opera by W. A. Mozart
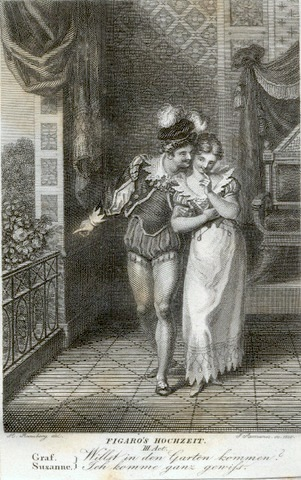
- Early 19th-century engraving depicting Count Almaviva and Susanna in act 3
- Native title: Le nozze di Figaro
- Librettist: Lorenzo Da Ponte
- Language: Italian
- Based on: La folle journée, ou le Mariage de Figaro by Beaumarchais
- Premiere: 1 May 1786; Burgtheater, Vienna

The Marriage of Figaro (Italian: Le nozze di Figaro, pronounced [le ˈnɔttse di ˈfiːɡaro]), K. 492, is a commedia per musica (opera buffa) in four acts composed in 1786 by Wolfgang Amadeus Mozart, with an Italian libretto written by Lorenzo Da Ponte. It premiered at the Burgtheater in Vienna on 1 May 1786. The opera's libretto is based on the 1784 stage comedy by Beaumarchais, La folle journée, ou le Mariage de Figaro ("The Mad Day, or The Marriage of Figaro"). It tells how the servants Figaro and Susanna succeed in getting married, foiling the efforts of their philandering employer Count Almaviva to seduce Susanna and teaching him a lesson in fidelity.

Considered one of the greatest operas ever written, it is a cornerstone of the repertoire and appears consistently among the top ten in the Operabase list of most frequently performed operas. In 2017, BBC News Magazine asked 172 opera singers to vote for the best operas ever written. The Marriage of Figaro came in first out of the 20 operas featured, with the magazine describing it as being "one of the supreme masterpieces of operatic comedy, whose rich sense of humanity shines out of Mozart's miraculous score".

== Composition history ==
Beaumarchais's earlier play The Barber of Seville had already made a successful transition to opera in a version by Paisiello. Beaumarchais's Mariage de Figaro, with its frank treatment of class conflict, was at first banned in Vienna: Emperor Joseph II stated that "since the piece contains much that is objectionable, I therefore expect that the Censor shall either reject it altogether, or at any rate have such alterations made in it that he shall be responsible for the performance of this play and for the impression it may make", after which the Austrian Censor duly forbade performing the German version of the play. Mozart's librettist Lorenzo Da Ponte managed to get official approval from the emperor for an operatic version, which eventually achieved great success.

The opera was the first of three collaborations between Mozart and Da Ponte, followed by Don Giovanni and Così fan tutte. It was Mozart who originally selected Beaumarchais's play and brought it to Da Ponte, who turned it into a libretto in six weeks, rewriting it in poetic Italian and removing all of the original's political references. In particular, Da Ponte replaced Figaro's climactic speech against inherited nobility with an equally angry aria against unfaithful wives. The libretto was approved by the Emperor before any music was written by Mozart.

The Imperial Italian opera company paid Mozart 450 florins for the work; this was three times his meagre yearly salary when he had worked as a court musician in Salzburg. Da Ponte was paid 200 florins.

== Roles ==
The voice types that appear in this table are those listed in the critical edition published in the Neue Mozart-Ausgabe. In modern performance practice, Cherubino and Marcellina are usually assigned to mezzo-sopranos, and Figaro to a bass-baritone.

Roles, voice types, and premiere cast
Role	Voice type	Premiere cast, 1 May 1786 Conductor: W. A. Mozart
Count Almaviva	baritone	Stefano Mandini
Countess Rosina Almaviva	soprano	Luisa Laschi
Susanna, the countess's maid	soprano	Nancy Storace
Figaro, personal valet to the count	bass	Francesco Benucci
Cherubino, the count's page	soprano (breeches role)	Dorotea Bussani
Marcellina, Doctor Bartolo's housekeeper	soprano	Maria Mandini
Bartolo, doctor from Seville, also a practising lawyer	bass	Francesco Bussani
Basilio, music teacher	tenor	Michael Kelly
Don Curzio, judge	tenor	Michael Kelly
Barbarina, Antonio's daughter, Susanna's cousin	soprano	Anna Gottlieb
Antonio, the count's gardener, Susanna's uncle	bass	Francesco Bussani
Chorus of peasants, villagers, and servants

== Instrumentation ==
The Marriage of Figaro is scored for two flutes, two oboes, two clarinets, two bassoons, two horns, two clarini, timpani, and strings; the recitativi secchi are accompanied by a keyboard instrument, usually a fortepiano or a harpsichord, often joined by a cello. The instrumentation of the recitativi secchi is not given in the score, so it is up to the conductor and the performers. A typical performance lasts around three hours.

== Synopsis ==
The Marriage of Figaro continues the plot of The Barber of Seville several years later, and recounts a single "day of madness" (la folle journée) in the palace of Count Almaviva near Seville, Spain. Rosina is now the countess. Dr. Bartolo is seeking revenge against Figaro for thwarting his plans to marry Rosina himself, and Count Almaviva has degenerated from the romantic youth of Barber, (a tenor in Paisiello's 1782 opera), into a scheming, bullying, skirt-chasing baritone. Having gratefully given Figaro a job as head of his servant-staff, he is now persistently trying to exercise his droit du seigneur – his right to bed a servant girl on her wedding night – with Figaro's bride-to-be, Susanna, who is the countess's maid. He keeps finding excuses to delay the civil part of the wedding of his two servants, which is arranged for this very day. Figaro, Susanna, and the countess conspire to embarrass the count and expose his scheming. He retaliates by trying to compel Figaro legally to marry a woman old enough to be his mother, but it turns out at the last minute that she really is his mother. Through the clever manipulations of Susanna and the countess, Figaro and Susanna are finally able to marry.

Place: Count Almaviva's estate, Aguas-Frescas, three leagues outside Seville, Spain.

=== Overture ===
Overture
Performed by Musopen Symphony (4:00)

"Cinque, dieci, venti"
Renato Capecchi, Deutsches Symphonie-Orchester Berlin, Ferenc Fricsay (1960)

"Se a caso madama la notte ti chiama"
Renato Capecchi, Irmgard Seefried

The overture is in the key of D major; the tempo marking is presto; i.e. quick. The work is well known and often played independently as a concert piece.

=== Act 1 ===
A partly furnished room, with a chair in the centre.

Figaro happily measures the space where the bridal bed will fit while Susanna tries on her wedding bonnet (which she has sewn herself) in front of a mirror. (Duet: "Cinque, dieci, venti" – "Five, ten, twenty"). Figaro is quite pleased with their new room; Susanna far less so (Duettino: "Se a caso madama la notte ti chiama" – "If the countess should call you during the night"). She is bothered by its proximity to the count's chambers: it seems he has been making advances toward her and plans on exercising his droit du seigneur, the feudal right of a lord to bed a servant girl on her wedding night before her husband can have sex with her. The count had the right abolished when he married Rosina, but he now wants to reinstate it. The countess rings for Susanna and she rushes off to answer. Figaro, confident in his own resourcefulness, resolves to outwit the count (Cavatina: "Se vuol ballare, signor contino" – "If you want to dance, Sir Count").

Figaro departs, and Dr. Bartolo arrives with Marcellina, his old housekeeper. Figaro had previously borrowed a large sum of money from her, and in lieu of collateral, had promised to marry her if unable to repay at the appointed time; she now intends to enforce that promise by suing him. Bartolo, seeking revenge against Figaro for having facilitated the union of the count and Rosina (in The Barber of Seville), agrees to represent Marcellina pro bono, and assures her, in comical lawyer-speak, that he can win the case for her (aria: "La vendetta" – "Vengeance").

Bartolo departs, Susanna returns, and Marcellina and Susanna exchange very politely delivered sarcastic insults (duet: "Via resti servita, madama brillante" – "After you, brilliant madam"). Susanna triumphs in the exchange by congratulating her rival on her impressive age. The older woman departs in a fury.

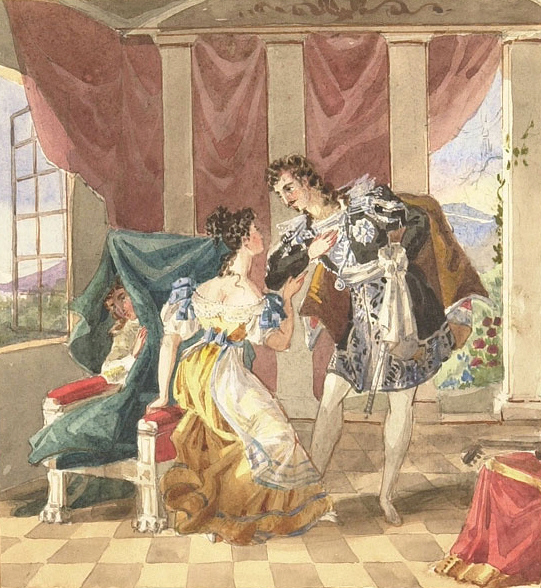
Act 1: Cherubino hides behind Susanna's chair as the count arrives.

Cherubino then arrives and after describing his emerging infatuation with all women, particularly with his "beautiful godmother" the countess, (aria: "Non so più cosa son" – "I don't know anymore what I am") asks for Susanna's aid with the count. It seems the count is angry with Cherubino's amorous ways, having discovered him with the gardener's daughter, Barbarina, and plans to punish him. Cherubino wants Susanna to ask the countess to intercede on his behalf. When the count appears, Cherubino hides behind a chair, not wanting to be seen alone with Susanna. The count uses the opportunity of finding Susanna alone to step up his demands for favours from her, and offers to pay money if she will submit to him. As Basilio, the music teacher, arrives, the count, not wanting to be caught alone with Susanna, hides behind the chair. Cherubino leaves that hiding place just in time, and jumps onto the chair while Susanna scrambles to cover him with a dress.

When Basilio starts to gossip about Cherubino's obvious attraction to the countess, the count angrily leaps from his hiding place (terzetto: "Cosa sento!" – "What do I hear!"). He disparages the "absent" page's incessant flirting and describes how he caught him with Barbarina under the kitchen table. As he lifts the dress from the chair to illustrate how he had lifted the tablecloth to find Cherubino with Barbarina, he finds the very same Cherubino in the hiding spot. The count is furious, but is reminded that the page overheard the count's advances on Susanna, information that the count wants to keep from the countess. The young man is ultimately saved from punishment by the entrance of the peasants of the count's estate, a preemptive attempt by Figaro to make the count commit to a formal gesture symbolising his promise that Susanna would enter into the marriage unsullied. The count evades Figaro's plan by postponing the gesture. The count says that he forgives Cherubino, but he dispatches him to his own regiment in Seville for army duty, effective immediately. Figaro gives Cherubino mocking advice about his new, harsh, military life from which all luxury, and especially women, will be totally excluded (aria: "Non più andrai" – "No more gallivanting").

=== Act 2 ===
A handsome room with an alcove, a dressing room on the left, a door in the background (leading to the servants' quarters) and a window at the side.

"Porgi, amor"
Provided by Musopen (3:36)

The countess laments her husband's infidelity (aria: "Porgi, amor, qualche ristoro" – "Grant, love, some comfort"). Susanna comes in to prepare the countess for the day. She responds to the countess's questions by telling her that the count is not trying to seduce her; he is merely offering her a monetary contract in return for her affection. Figaro enters and explains his plan to distract the count with anonymous letters warning him of adulterers. He has already sent one to the count (via Basilio) indicating that the countess has a rendezvous of her own that evening. They hope that the count will be too busy looking for imaginary adulterers to interfere with Figaro and Susanna's wedding. Figaro additionally advises the countess to keep Cherubino around. She should dress him up as a girl and lure the count into an illicit rendezvous where he can be caught and embarrassed. Figaro leaves.

"Voi che sapete cosa è amor"
Performed in 1910 by Nellie Melba (3:24)

Cherubino arrives, sent in by Figaro. Susanna urges him to sing the song he wrote for the countess (aria: "Voi che sapete che cosa è amor" – "You ladies who know what love is, is it what I'm suffering from?"). After the song, the countess, seeing Cherubino's military commission, notices that the count was in such a hurry that he forgot to seal it with his signet ring (thus omitting that which would make it an official document).

Susanna and the countess then begin with their plan. Susanna takes off Cherubino's cloak, and she begins to comb his hair and teach him to behave and walk like a woman (aria of Susanna: "Venite, inginocchiatevi" – "Come, kneel down before me"). Then she leaves the room through a door at the back to get the dress for Cherubino, taking his cloak with her.

While the countess and Cherubino are waiting for Susanna to come back, they suddenly hear the count arriving. Cherubino quickly hides in the closet and locks the door. The countess reluctantly lets the count into her room. The count hears a noise from the closet. The countess tells him that Susanna is in the closet and that she cannot come out because she is trying on her wedding dress. At this moment, Susanna re-enters from another room, quickly realises what is going on, and hides before anyone can see her (Trio: "Susanna, or via, sortite" – "Susanna, come out!"). The count shouts through the closet door for her to identify herself by her voice, but the countess orders her to be silent. Furious and suspicious, the count leaves with the countess, in search of tools to force the closet door open. As they leave, he locks all the bedroom doors to prevent the intruder from escaping. Cherubino and Susanna emerge from their hiding places, and Cherubino escapes by jumping through the window into the garden. Susanna then takes Cherubino's place in the closet, vowing to make the count look foolish (duet: "Aprite, presto, aprite" – "Open the door, quickly!").

Act 2 finale
"Esci omai, garzon malnato"

"Signore, cos'è quel stupore"

"Signore di fuori"

"Ah! signore ... Cosa è stato"

"Voi Signor, che giusto siete"
Ferenc Fricsay, Deutsches Symphonie-Orchester Berlin, 1960 (cast: discography)

The count and countess return. The countess, thinking herself trapped, desperately admits that Cherubino is hidden in the closet. The enraged count draws his sword, promising to kill Cherubino on the spot, but when the closet door is opened, to their astonishment, they find only Susanna (Finale: "Esci omai, garzon malnato" – "Come out of there, you ill-born boy!"). The count demands an explanation; the countess tells him it is a practical joke to test his trust in her. Shamed by his own jealousy, the count pleads for forgiveness. When the count presses about the anonymous letter, Susanna and the countess reveal that the letter was written by Figaro, and then delivered by Basilio. Figaro then arrives and tries to start the wedding festivities, but the count berates him with questions about the anonymous note. Just as the count is starting to run out of questions, Antonio the gardener arrives, complaining that a man has jumped out of the window and damaged his carnations while running away. Antonio adds that he tentatively identified the running man as Cherubino, but Figaro claims it was he himself who jumped out of the window, and pretends to have injured his foot while landing. Figaro, Susanna, and the countess attempt to discredit Antonio as a chronic drunkard whose constant inebriation makes him unreliable and prone to fantasy, but Antonio brings forward a paper, which, he says, was dropped by the escaping man. The count orders Figaro to prove he was the jumper by identifying the paper (which is, in fact, Cherubino's appointment to the army). Figaro is at a loss, but Susanna and the countess manage to signal the correct answers, and Figaro triumphantly identifies the document. His victory is, however, short-lived: Marcellina, Bartolo, and Basilio enter, bringing charges against Figaro and demanding that he honour his contract to marry Marcellina, since he cannot repay her loan. The count happily postpones the wedding in order to investigate the charge.

=== Act 3 ===
A rich hall, with two thrones, prepared for the wedding ceremony.

"Crudel! perchè finora"
Dietrich Fischer-Dieskau, Irmgard Seefried, Deutsches Symphonie-Orchester Berlin, Ferenc Fricsay (1960)

"Vedro mentr'io sospiro"
Fischer-Dieskau, Fricsay (1960)

"Riconosci in questo amplesso"
Deutsches Symphonie-Orchester Berlin, Fricsay (1960) (cast: discography)

"Dove sono i bei momenti"
Maria Stader, Fricsay (1960)

The count mulls over the confusing situation. At the urging of the countess, Susanna enters and gives a false promise to meet the count later that night in the garden (duet: "Crudel! perchè finora" – "Cruel girl, why did you make me wait so long"). As Susanna leaves, the count overhears her telling Figaro that he has already won the case. Realising that he is being tricked (recitative and aria: "Hai già vinta la causa! ... Vedrò, mentr'io sospiro" – "You've already won the case!" ... "Shall I, while sighing, see"), he resolves to punish Figaro by forcing him to marry Marcellina.

Figaro's hearing follows, and the count's judgement is that Figaro must marry Marcellina. Figaro argues that he cannot get married without his parents' permission, and that he does not know who his parents are, because he was stolen from them when he was a baby. The ensuing discussion reveals that Figaro is Raffaello, the long-lost illegitimate son of Bartolo and Marcellina. A touching scene of reconciliation occurs. During the celebrations, Susanna enters with a payment to release Figaro from his debt to Marcellina. Seeing Figaro and Marcellina in celebration together, Susanna mistakenly believes that Figaro now prefers Marcellina to her. She has a tantrum and slaps Figaro's face. Marcellina explains, and Susanna, realising her mistake, joins the celebration. Bartolo, overcome with emotion, agrees to marry Marcellina that evening in a double wedding (sextet: "Riconosci in questo amplesso" – "Recognise in this embrace").

All leave before Barbarina, Antonio's daughter, invites Cherubino back to her house so they can disguise him as a girl. The countess, alone, ponders the loss of her happiness (aria: "Dove sono i bei momenti" – "Where are they, the beautiful moments"). Meanwhile, Antonio informs the count that Cherubino is not in Seville, but in fact at his house. Susanna enters and explains to her mistress the plan to trap the count. The countess dictates a love letter for Susanna to send to the count, which suggests that he meet her (Susanna) that night, "under the pines". The letter instructs the count to return the pin that fastens the letter (duet: "Sull'aria ... che soave zeffiretto" – "On the breeze... What a gentle little zephyr").

A chorus of young peasants, among them Cherubino disguised as a girl, arrives to serenade the countess. The count arrives with Antonio and discovering the page, is enraged. His anger is quickly dispelled by Barbarina, who publicly recalls that he had once offered to give her anything she wanted in exchange for certain favours, and asks for Cherubino's hand in marriage. Thoroughly embarrassed, the count allows Cherubino to stay.

The act closes with the double wedding, during the course of which Susanna delivers her letter to the count (Finale: "Ecco la marcia" – "Here is the procession"). Figaro watches the count prick his finger on the pin, and laughs, unaware that the love-note is an invitation for the count to tryst with Figaro's own bride Susanna. As the curtain drops, the two newlywed couples rejoice.

=== Act 4 ===
The garden, with two pavilions. Night.

"L'ho perduta"
Rosl Schwaiger, Ferenc Fricsay, RIAS-Symphonie-Orchester, 1960

Following the directions in the letter, the count has sent the pin back to Susanna, giving it to Barbarina. However, Barbarina has lost it (aria: "L'ho perduta, me meschina" – "I have lost it, poor me"). Figaro and Marcellina see Barbarina, and Figaro asks her what she is doing. When he hears the pin is Susanna's, he is overcome with jealousy, especially as he recognises the pin as the one that fastened the letter to the count. Thinking that Susanna is meeting the count behind his back, Figaro complains to his mother, and swears to be avenged on the count and Susanna, and on all unfaithful wives. Marcellina urges caution, but Figaro will not listen. Figaro rushes off, and Marcellina resolves to inform Susanna of Figaro's intentions. Marcellina sings an aria lamenting that male and female wild beasts get along with each other, but rational humans cannot (aria: "Il capro e la capretta" – "The billy-goat and the she-goat"). (This aria and the subsequent aria of Basilio are mostly not performed; however, some recordings include them.)

"Aprite un po' quegli occhi"
Renato Capecchi

"Deh vieni, non tardar"
Irmgard Seefried

Act 4 finale
"Pian pianin le andrò più presso"

"Tutto è tranquillo e placido"

"Pace, pace, mio dolce tesoro"

"Gente, gente, all'armi"

Motivated by jealousy, Figaro tells Bartolo and Basilio to come to his aid when he gives the signal. Basilio comments on Figaro's foolishness and claims he was once as frivolous as Figaro was. He tells a tale of how he was given common sense by "Donna Flemma" ("Dame Prudence") and learned the importance of not crossing powerful people, (aria: "In quegli anni" – "In those years"). They exit, leaving Figaro alone. Figaro muses bitterly on the inconstancy of women (recitative and aria: "Tutto è disposto ... Aprite un po' quegli occhi" – "Everything is ready ... Open those eyes a little"). Susanna and the countess arrive, each dressed in the other's clothes. Marcellina is with them, having informed Susanna of Figaro's suspicions and plans. After they discuss the plan, Marcellina and the countess leave, and Susanna teases Figaro by singing a love song to her beloved within Figaro's hearing (aria: "Deh vieni non tardar" – "Oh come, don't delay"). Figaro is hiding behind a bush and, thinking the song is for the count, becomes increasingly jealous.

The countess arrives in Susanna's dress. Cherubino shows up and starts teasing "Susanna" (really the countess), endangering the plan. (Finale: "Pian pianin le andrò più presso" – "Softly, softly I'll approach her"). The count strikes out in the dark at Cherubino, but his punch hits Figaro and Cherubino runs off.

The count now begins making earnest love to "Susanna" (really the countess), and gives her a jewelled ring. They go offstage together, where the countess dodges him, hiding in the dark. Onstage, meanwhile, the real Susanna enters, wearing the countess's clothes. Figaro mistakes her for the real countess, and starts to tell her of the count's intentions, but suddenly he recognises his bride in disguise. He plays along with the joke by pretending to be in love with "my lady", and inviting her to have sex right then and there. Susanna, fooled, loses her temper and slaps him many times. Figaro finally lets on that he has recognised Susanna's voice, and they make peace, resolving to conclude the comedy together ("Pace, pace, mio dolce tesoro" – "Peace, peace, my sweet treasure").

The count, unable to find "Susanna", enters frustrated. Figaro gets his attention by loudly declaring his love for "the countess" (really Susanna). The enraged count calls for his people and for weapons: his servant is seducing his wife. (Ultima scena: "Gente, gente, all'armi, all'armi" – "Gentlemen, to arms!") Bartolo, Basilio and Antonio enter with torches as, one by one, the count drags out Cherubino, Barbarina, Marcellina and the "Countess" from behind the pavilion.

All beg him to forgive Figaro and the "Countess", but he loudly refuses, repeating "no" at the top of his voice, until finally the real countess re-enters and reveals her true identity. The count, seeing the ring he had given her, realises that the supposed Susanna he was trying to seduce was actually his wife. He kneels and pleads for forgiveness, ("Contessa perdono!" – "Countess, forgive me!"). The countess replies that she does forgive him ("Più docile io sono e dico di sì" – "I am kinder [than you], and I say yes"). Everyone declares that they will be happy with this ("A tutti contenti saremo cosi"), and set out to celebrate.

== Musical numbers ==
- Overture – Orchestra

Act 1

- 1. Cinque... dieci... venti... – Susanna, Figaro
- 2. Se a caso madama la notte ti chiama – Susanna, Figaro
- 3. Se vuol ballare, signor Contino – Figaro
- 4. La vendetta, oh la vendetta! – Bartolo
- 5. Via resti servita, madama brillante – Susanna, Marcellina
- 6. Non so più cosa son, cosa faccio – Cherubino
- 7. Cosa sento! tosto andate – Susanna, Basilio, Count
- 8. Giovani liete, fiori spargete – Chorus
- 9. Non più andrai, farfallone amoroso – Figaro

Act 2

- 10. Porgi amor qualche ristoro – Countess
- 11. Voi che sapete che cosa è amor – Cherubino
- 12. Venite inginocchiatevi – Susanna
- 13. Susanna or via sortite – Countess, Susanna, Count
- 14. Aprite presto aprite – Susanna, Cherubino
- 15. Esci omai, garzon malnato – Susanna, Countess, Marcellina, Basilio, Count, Antonio, Bartolo, Figaro

Act 3

- 16. Crudel! perché finora – Susanna, Count
- 17. Hai già vinta la causa – Vedrò mentr'io sospiro – Count
- 18. Riconosci in questo amplesso – Susanna, Marcellina, Don Curzio, Count, Bartolo, Figaro
- 19. E Susanna non vien – Dove sono i bei momenti – Countess
- 20. Canzonetta sull'aria – Susanna, Countess
- 21. Ricevete, o padroncina – Farm girls
- 22. Ecco la marcia, andiamo – Susanna, Countess, Count, Figaro; Chorus

Act 4

- 23. L'ho perduta... me meschina – Barbarina
- 24. Il capro e la capretta – Marcellina
- 25. In quegl'anni in cui val poco – Basilio
- 26. Tutto è disposto – Aprite un po' quegl'occhi – Figaro
- 27. Giunse alfin il momento – Deh vieni non tardar – Susanna
- 28. Pian pianin le andrò più presso – Susanna, Countess, Barbarina, Cherubino, Marcellina, Basilio, Count, Antonio, Figaro, Bartolo

== Frequently omitted numbers ==
Two arias from act 4 are often omitted: one in which Marcellina regrets that people (unlike goats, sheep, or wild beasts) abuse their mates (Il capro e la capretta); and one in which Don Basilio tells how he saved himself from several dangers in his youth by using the skin of a donkey for shelter and camouflage (In quegli anni).

Mozart wrote two replacement arias for Susanna when the role was taken over by Adriana Ferrarese in the 1789 revival. The replacement arias, "Un moto di gioia" (replacing "Venite, inginocchiatevi" in act 2) and "Al desio di chi t'adora" (replacing "Deh vieni non tardar" in act 4), in which the two clarinets are replaced with basset horns, are normally not used in modern performances. A notable exception was a series of performances at the Metropolitan Opera in 1998 with Cecilia Bartoli as Susanna.

== Performance history ==
Figaro premiered at the Burgtheater in Vienna on 1 May 1786, with a cast listed in the "Roles" section above. Mozart himself conducted the first two performances, conducting seated at the keyboard, the custom of the day. Later performances were conducted by Joseph Weigl. The first production was given eight further performances, all in 1786.

Although the total of nine performances was nothing like the frequency of performance of Mozart's later success, The Magic Flute, which for months was performed roughly every other day, the premiere is generally judged to have been a success. The applause of the audience on the first night resulted in five numbers being encored, seven on 8 May. Emperor Joseph, in charge of the Burgtheater, was concerned by the length of the performance and directed his aide Count Orsini–Rosenberg as follows:

To prevent the excessive duration of operas, without however prejudicing the fame often sought by opera singers from the repetition of vocal pieces, I deem the enclosed notice to the public (that no piece for more than a single voice is to be repeated) to be the most reasonable expedient. You will therefore cause some posters to this effect to be printed.

The requested posters were printed up and posted in the Burgtheater in time for the third performance on 24 May.

The newspaper Wiener Realzeitung carried a review of the opera in its issue of 11 July 1786. It alludes to interference probably produced by paid hecklers, but praises the work warmly:

Mozart's music was generally admired by connoisseurs already at the first performance, if I except only those whose self-love and conceit will not allow them to find merit in anything not written by themselves.

The public, however ... did not really know on the first day where it stood. It heard many a bravo from unbiased connoisseurs, but obstreperous louts in the uppermost storey exerted their hired lungs with all their might to deafen singers and audience alike with their St! and Pst; and consequently opinions were divided at the end of the piece.

Apart from that, it is true that the first performance was none of the best, owing to the difficulties of the composition.

But now, after several performances, one would be subscribing either to the cabal or to tastelessness if one were to maintain that Herr Mozart's music is anything but a masterpiece of art.

It contains so many beauties, and such a wealth of ideas, as can be drawn only from the source of innate genius.

The Hungarian poet Ferenc Kazinczy was in the audience for a May performance, and later remembered the powerful impression the work made on him:

[Nancy] Storace [see below], the beautiful singer, enchanted eye, ear, and soul. – Mozart conducted the orchestra, playing his fortepiano; but the joy which this music causes is so far removed from all sensuality that one cannot speak of it. Where could words be found that are worthy to describe such joy?

Joseph Haydn appreciated the opera greatly, writing to a friend that he heard it in his dreams. In summer 1790 Haydn attempted to produce the work with his own company at Eszterháza, but was prevented from doing so by the death of his patron, Nikolaus Esterházy.

=== Other early performances ===
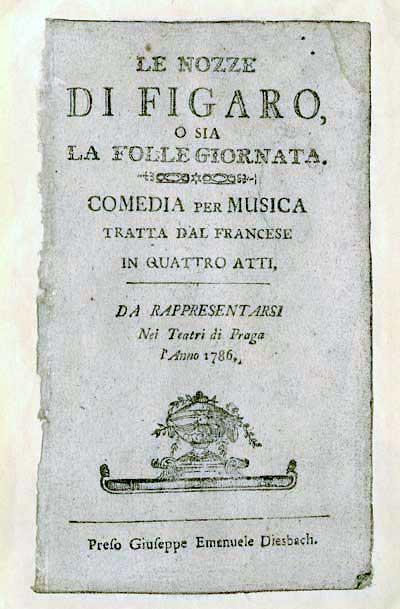
Printed libretto for the Prague production of 1786

The Emperor requested a special performance at his palace theatre in Laxenburg, which took place in June 1786.

The opera was produced in Prague starting in December 1786 by the Pasquale Bondini company. This production was a tremendous success; the newspaper Prager Oberpostamtszeitung called the work "a masterpiece", and said "no piece (for everyone here asserts) has ever caused such a sensation." Local music lovers paid for Mozart to visit Prague and hear the production; he listened on 17 January 1787, and conducted it himself on the 22nd. The success of the Prague production led to the commissioning of the next Mozart/Da Ponte opera, Don Giovanni, premiered in Prague in 1787 (see Mozart and Prague).

The work was not performed in Vienna during 1787 or 1788, but starting in 1789 there was a revival production. For this occasion Mozart replaced both arias of Susanna with new compositions, better suited to the voice of Adriana Ferrarese del Bene who took the role. To replace "Deh vieni" he wrote "Al desio di chi t'adora" – "[come and fly] To the desire of [the one] who adores you" (K. 577) in July 1789, and to replace "Venite, inginocchiatevi" he wrote "Un moto di gioia" – "A joyous emotion", (K. 579), probably in mid-1790.

== Critical discussion ==
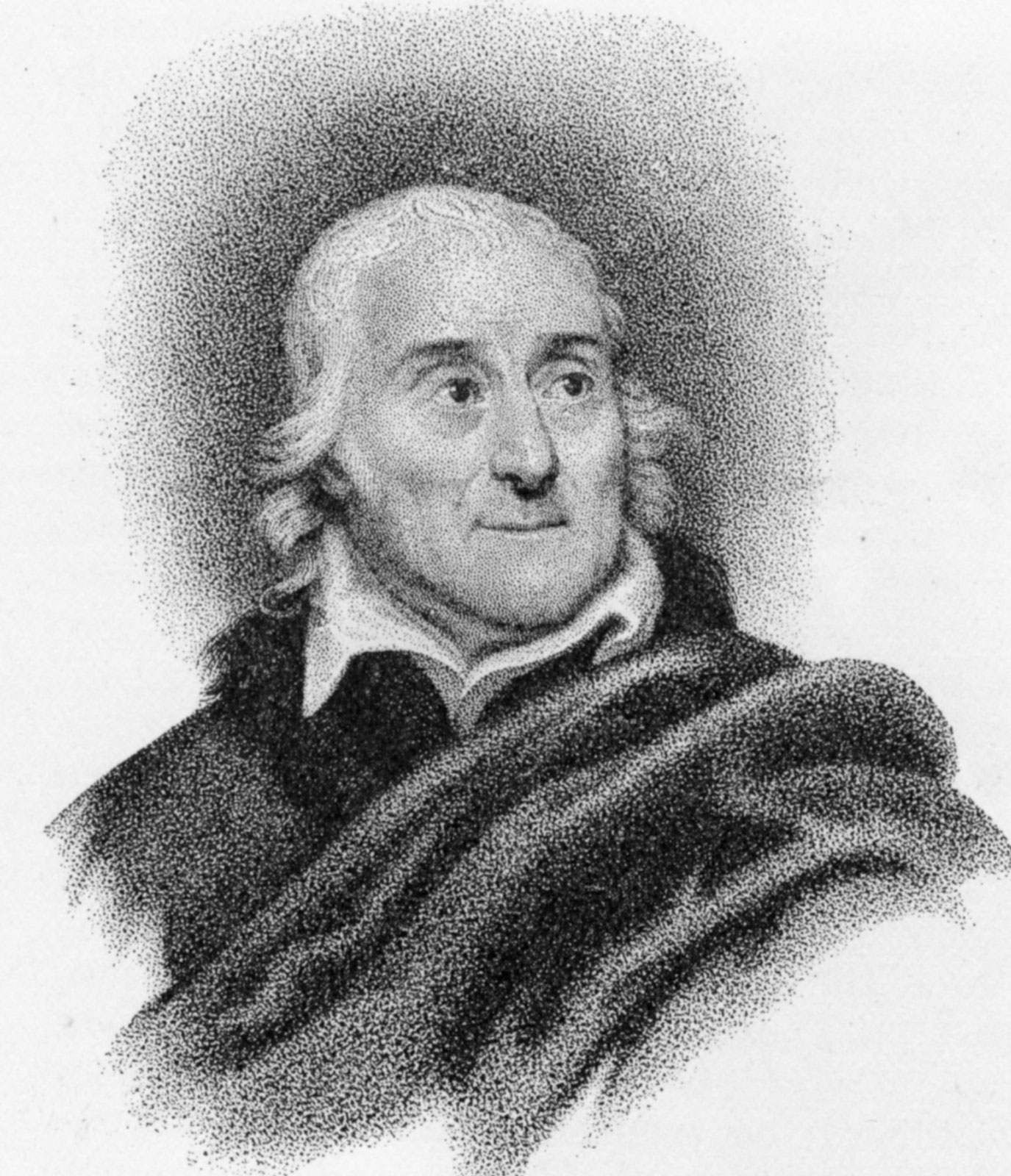
Engraving of Lorenzo da Ponte by Michele Pekenino, after a portrait by the American painter Nathaniel Rogers (1788–1844)

Lorenzo Da Ponte wrote a preface to the first published version of the libretto, in which he boldly claimed that he and Mozart had created a new form of music drama:

In spite ... of every effort ... to be brief, the opera will not be one of the shortest to have appeared on our stage, for which we hope sufficient excuse will be found in the variety of threads from which the action of this play [i.e. Beaumarchais's] is woven, the vastness and grandeur of the same, the multiplicity of the musical numbers that had to be made in order not to leave the actors too long unemployed, to diminish the vexation and monotony of long recitatives, and to express with varied colours the various emotions that occur, but above all in our desire to offer as it were a new kind of spectacle to a public of so refined a taste and understanding.

Charles Rosen, in The Classical Style, proposes to take Da Ponte's words quite seriously, noting the "richness of the ensemble writing", which carries forward the action in a far more dramatic way than recitatives would. Rosen also suggests that the musical language of the classical style was adapted by Mozart to convey the drama; many sections of the opera resemble sonata form. By movement through a sequence of keys, they build up and resolve musical tension, providing a natural musical reflection of the drama. As Rosen writes:

The synthesis of accelerating complexity and symmetrical resolution which was at the heart of Mozart's style enabled him to find a musical equivalent for the great stage works which were his dramatic models. The Marriage of Figaro in Mozart's version is the dramatic equal, and in many respects the superior, of Beaumarchais's work.

This is demonstrated in the closing numbers of all four acts: as the drama escalates, Mozart eschews recitativi altogether and opts for increasingly sophisticated writing, bringing his characters on stage, revelling in a complex weave of solo and ensemble singing in multiple combinations, and climaxing in seven- and eight-voice tutti for acts 2 and 4. The finale of act 2, lasting 20 minutes, is one of the longest uninterrupted pieces of music Mozart ever wrote. Eight of the opera's 11 characters appear on stage in its more than 900 bars of continuous music.

Mozart uses the sound of two horns playing together to represent cuckoldry in the act 4 aria "Aprite un po' quegli occhi". Verdi later used the same device in Ford's aria in Falstaff.

Johannes Brahms said "In my opinion, each number in Figaro is a miracle; it is totally beyond me how anyone could create anything so perfect; nothing like it was ever done again, not even by Beethoven."

== Other uses of the melodies ==
A musical phrase from the act 1 trio of The Marriage of Figaro (where Basilio sings Così fan tutte le belle) was later reused by Mozart in the overture to his opera Così fan tutte. Mozart also quotes Figaro's aria "Non più andrai" in the second act of his opera Don Giovanni. Further, Mozart used it in 1791 in his Five Contredanses, K. 609, No. 1. Mozart reused the music of the "Agnus Dei" of his earlier Krönungsmesse (Coronation Mass) for the countess's "Dove sono", in C major instead of the original F major. Mozart also reused the motif that begins his early bassoon concerto in another aria sung by the countess, "Porgi, amor". Beethoven wrote Variations on 'Se vuol ballare', WoO 40, for violin and piano on Figaro's cavatina. Ferdinand Ries used music from the opera in his Fantasies on Themes from 'Le Nozze di Figaro', Op. 77. Moscheles used the duettino "Crudel! perchè finora" in his Fantaisie dramatique sur des Airs favoris, Bijoux à la Malibran for piano, Op. 72/4. Johann Nepomuk Hummel quoted it in his Fantasia über 'Le nozze di Figaro', Op. 124. Franz Liszt quoted the opera in his Fantasy on Themes from Mozart's Figaro and Don Giovanni S. 697.

In 1819, Henry R. Bishop wrote an adaptation of the opera in English, translating from Beaumarchais's play and re-using some of Mozart's music, while adding some of his own.

In his 1991 opera, The Ghosts of Versailles, which includes elements of Beaumarchais's third Figaro play (La Mère coupable) and in which the main characters of The Marriage of Figaro also appear, John Corigliano quotes Mozart's opera, especially the overture, several times.

== See also ==
- List of operas by Mozart
