= Figaro =

Figaro may refer to:

== Literature ==
- Figaro, the central character in:
  - The Barber of Seville (play), a 1775 play by Pierre Beaumarchais
    - The Barber of Seville (Paisiello), a 1782 opera by Paisiello based on the play
    - The Barber of Seville, an 1816 opera by Rossini based on the play
    - Figaro qua, Figaro là, 1950 Italian comedy film directed by Carlo Ludovico Bragaglia
  - The Guilty Mother, a 1792 play by Beaumarchais
    - La mère coupable, a 1966 opera by Milhaud based on the play
  - The Marriage of Figaro (play), a 1784 play by Beaumarchais
    - The Marriage of Figaro, a 1786 opera by Mozart based on the play
- Figaro, a comic strip character in The Topper

=== Publications ===
- Le Figaro, the oldest extant newspaper in France
- Figaro in London, an early Victorian comic magazine published in England
- London Figaro, a late Victorian satirical magazine published in England
- Queensland Figaro, a weekly newspaper published from 1883 to 1936 in Australia
- Figaro (Vienna), a Viennese satirical magazine published 1857–1919
- Figaro (New Orleans), a weekly magazine published from 1883 to 1884

== Entertainment ==
- The Crazy Day or The Marriage of Figaro, a 2004 comedy musical staged by Russian and Ukrainian television channels NTV (Russia) and Inter
- Figaro (Disney), a fictional kitten created by The Walt Disney Company who first appeared in the 1940 film Pinocchio and later becomes Minnie Mouse's pet cat
- Figaro, a kingdom in the video game Final Fantasy VI
- Galileo Figaro, character from the stage musical We Will Rock You
- MDR Figaro, German broadcaster Mitteldeutscher Rundfunk's cultural radio channel
- Figaro, a 1929 French silent historical comedy film
- Figaro, movie production company of Joseph L. Mankiewicz
- The Abduction of Figaro, an opera parody by Peter Schickele
- Figaro, a 2008 French TV movie directed by Jacques Weber
- Falling for Figaro, a 2021 romantic comedy about aspiring opera singers

=== Music ===
- "Figaro" (song), a 1978 UK number-one song by Brotherhood of Man
- "Figaro", a song by Madvillain from their 2004 album Madvillainy
- "Figaro", a song by Nine Muses from their 2012 album Sweet Rendezvous

== People ==
- Pen-name of Henry Clapp, Jr. editor of The Saturday Press
- Figaro, nickname of Spanish author Mariano José de Larra

== Other ==
- Figaro chain, a type of chain used in jewelry
- Figaro Coffee Company, a chain of coffee shops in Philippines
- Figaro (shark), a genus of catsharks
- Nissan Figaro, a retro-styled compact car produced by Nissan in a limited production run in 1991
- Bénéteau Figaro, a design of sailing yacht used for French Offshore Racing
- Bénéteau Figaro 2, a design of sailing yacht used for French Offshore Racing
- Bénéteau Figaro 3, a design of sailing yacht used for French Offshore Racing
- Solitaire du Figaro, a sailing race, taking place every summer between France, England, Ireland, and Spain
