= Clavigo =

Clavigo may refer to:

- Clavigo (play), a 1774 play by Goethe
- Clavigo (film), a 1970 movie based on Goethe's play
- Clavigo, a 1999 ballet by Roland Petit
- Clavigo, a 1999 ballet by Tim Rushton
