= José Fajardo =

José Fajardo may refer to:

- José Fajardo (footballer) (born 1993), Panamanian footballer
- José Fajardo (musician) (1919–2001), Cuban musician
- José Fajardo, Guatemalan footballer

== See also ==
- José Clavijo y Fajardo
