= Figari (disambiguation) =

Figari is a commune in the Corse-du-Sud department of France on the island of Corsica.

Figari may also refer to:

- Antonio Bey Figari (1804–1870), Italian pharmacist and naturalist
- Eduardo Figari, Peruvian Maoist political leader
- Luis Fernando Figari (born 1947), Peruvian Catholic leader
- Pedro Figari (1861–1938), Uruguayan artist, lawyer, writer, and politician
- Figari Award, a Uruguayan art award, named for Pedro Figari

== See also ==
- Club Capitán Figari, a football club based in Lambaré, Paraguay
- Figaro (disambiguation)
