= Arnaud Marzorati =

Arnaud Marzorati (born ca. September 1969) is a French classical Baroque baritone singer and the founder of the musical ensemble Clique des Les Lunaisiens.

== Biography ==
Marzorati studied singing at the Centre de Musique Baroque de Versailles (CMBV - Centre of Baroque Music Versailles) and earned a premier prize in singing from the Conservatoire de Paris (Paris National Conservatory of Music and Dance (CNSMDP)). He Performed prominent roles like Papageno and Figaro with major opera houses and collaborated with renowned early music groups like Les Arts Florissants and founded Les Lunaisiens over two decades ago to revive traditional French historical songs, political literature, and popular poetry supported by the Royaumont Foundation. In 2015, he created La Guerre des théâtres and premiered the Atys en Madness at the Teatro Manoel in Valletta, Malta in partnership with the CMBV. In 2019, he entered a residency with Les Lunaisiens at the Festival des Abbayes en Lorraine and became an “associated artist” at La Barcarolle in Saint-Omer. He has release compilation CDs of Brassens, Boris Vian, the Napoleonic epic with Sabine Devieil, Molière and La Fontaine published by La Joie de Lire.

== Repertory ==
- The Muslim Pope and other songs (Le Pape Musulman & Autres Chansons) by Pierre-Jean de Béranger with Yves Rechsteiner, Freddy Eichelberger
- La Bouche et l'oreille by Gustave Nadaud
- "1789" with Jean-François Novelli (Alpha) and Révolutions (Paraty) with Les Lunaisiens
- Brassens, Boris Vian, the Napoleonic epic with Sabine Devieil
- Molière and La Fontaine by La Joie de Lire.
- "Vote for me!" (2017) at the Aparté label in partnership with the Palazzetto Bru Zane in Venice, the Baroque Music Center of Versailles (CMBV), France Musique, the national scene of Dunkirk
- Merd' v'la l'Hiver appears, with Stéphanie d'Oustrac at Alpha-Outhere (2023)
