= Éric Tappy =

Swiss operatic tenor (1931–2024)

- Éric Tappy, in the 1970s
- Born: 19 May 1931; Lausanne, Switzerland
- Died: 11 June 2024 (aged 93)
- Education: Conservatoire de Musique de Genève; Mozarteum
- Occupations: Operatic tenor; Academic teacher
- Organizations: Grand Théâtre de Genève; Opéra National de Lyon; Conservatoire de Genève
- Awards: Edison Award; Ordre des Arts et des Lettres

Éric Tappy (19 May 1931 – 11 June 2024) was a Swiss operatic tenor. He performed internationally, both in opera, known as a Mozart tenor, and in concert, especially as the Evangelist in Bach's Passions. He focused on teaching from 1981.

Tappy was a member of the Grand Théâtre de Genève from 1962 to 1974, where his wide repertoire included major Mozart roles and world premieres such as Darius Milhaud's La Mère coupable. He has been regarded as legendary for portraying Monteverdi's Orfeo, Tamino in Mozart's Die Zauberflöte and Debussy's Pelléas, with a voice of exemplary clarity and diction.

== Life and career ==
Tappy was born in Lausanne on 19 May 1931, to Constant Albert Tappy, a metal worker, and his wife Cécile Emile née Apothéloz. He received early musical instructions in violin and choral singing from his cousin André Charlet.

After Tappy became a teacher in 1951, he studied voice at the Conservatoire de Musique de Genève with Fernando Carpi. He studied further at the Salzburg Mozarteum with Ernst Reichert, at the Conservatorium van Hilversum with Eva Liebenberg, and in Paris with Nadia Boulanger. Concert activities began in 1956, and increased when he was awarded a prize in 1958, with concerts in Switzerland and abroad; he therefore abandoned his teaching position in 1959. He first performed the role of the Evangelist in Bach's St Matthew Passion in Strasbourg in 1959. He created the tenor part in Frank Martin's oratorio Mystère de la Nativité in Geneva in December 1959.

=== Opera ===
When the Grand Théâtre de Genève was reopened in 1962, Tappy appeared as Count de Lerme in Verdi's Don Carlos. He joined the company and performed there for twelve years a wide repertoire, including major Mozart roles and roles in new works such as Martin's Monsieur de Pourceaugnac and La Tempête; he took part in the world premiere of Darius Milhaud's La Mère coupable.

He appeared as a guest internationally, in Rameau's Zoroastre in Bordeaux and in Paris, in the title role of Monteverdi's L'Orfeo at the Drottningholm Palace Theatre, and as Nerone in L'incoronazione di Poppea at the Staatsoper Hannover. In August 1970, he was impressive as Tamino in Mozart's Die Zauberflöte at the Salzburg Festival, followed by the same role and also the title role of Mozart's La clemenza di Tito at the Aix-en-Provence Festival.

After he appeared as Nerone in L'incoronazione di Poppea at the Zürich Opera in 1979, directed by Jean-Pierre Ponnelle and conducted by Nikolaus Harnoncourt, alongside Rachel Yakar in the title role, the production was also shown at the Edinbourg Festival and La Scala in Milan, and was filmed. Tappy first appeared at the Royal Opera House in London in Mozart's La clemenza di Tito in 1974.

Tappy retired from the stage in 1981; his last performances on stage were Mozart's Lucio Silla in Zürich and Nerone at the San Francisco Opera.

=== Teaching ===
After his retirement Tappy worked as stage director and focused on teaching. He founded an opera studio, the Atelier d'interprétation vocale et dramatique, at the Opéra National de Lyon and directed it. He taught at the Conservatoire de Musique de Genève from 1984 to 1999.

=== Personal life ===
Tappy was married to Denise Guggenheim in 1953; they had two daughters. He died on 11 June 2024, at the age of 93.

== Recordings ==
Tappy recorded L'Orfeo in 1968. He recorded Debussy's Pelléas et Mélisande twice, in 1969 a live recording in Geneva conducted by Jean-Marie Auberson, with Erna Spoorenberg, Gérard Souzay, and the Orchestre de la Suisse Romande, and in 1979 conducted by Armin Jordan, with Yakar, Philippe Huttenlocher, and Chœurs et Orchestre National de L'Opéra Monte Carlo. A reviewer noted his "fine, lean voice", more virile and assertive than some colleagues, "powerful in his protestations of love", but "inclined to turn hard of tone when pushed". Tappy performed as Tamino in a recording of Die Zauberflöte taken in 1980 from the Salzburg Festival performance, alongside Ileana Cotrubaș as Pamina and Zdzisława Donat as the Queen of Night, conducted by James Levine. Tappy was also featured in two films by Ponnelle: L'incoronazione di Poppea in 1979 and La clemenza di Tito, alongside Tatiana Troyanos and Carol Neblett, in 1980. He recorded the oratorio L'Enfance du Christ by Berlioz, conducted by Colin Davis, and Clairières dans le ciel, a song cycle by Lili Boulanger.

== Awards ==
Tappy was awarded the gold medal of the Drottningholm Theatre for his portrayal of Monteverdi's Orfeo in 1966. Two years later he received the Edison Award for his recording of the same role. He became an officer of the Ordre des Arts et des Lettres in 1994. In 2007 he was awarded the Prix culturel de la Fondation Leenaards and the Médaille d'or of Lausanne.
