= Gustave Nadaud =

French composer and chansonnier

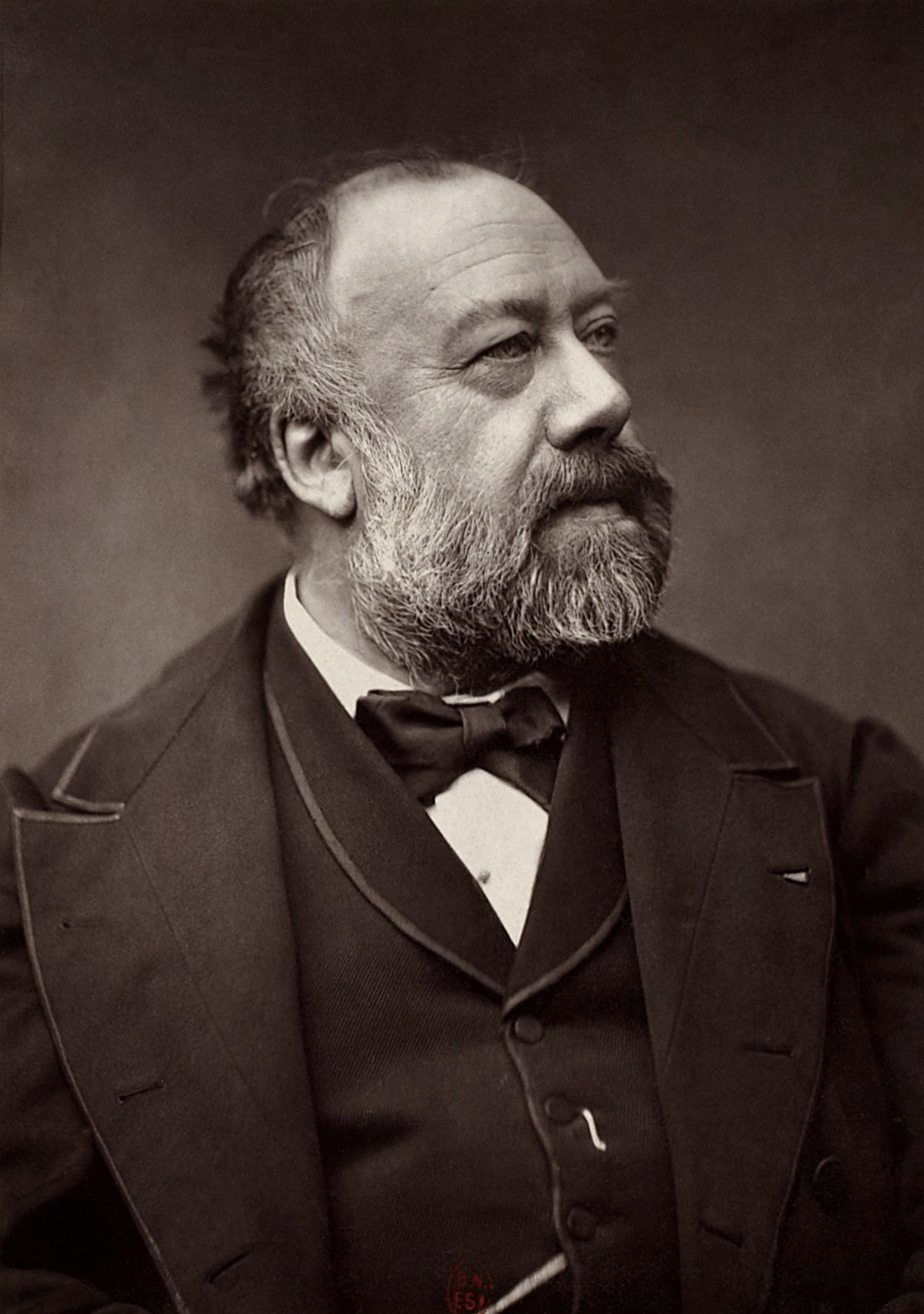
Gustave Nadaud

Gustave Nadaud (20 February 1820 – 28 April 1893) was a French composer and chansonnier.

== Career ==
Born in Roubaix, Nadaud's first career was as an accountant; he took up songwriting as a hobby at age 28. His friends encouraged him, and he submitted his work for publication in L'Illustration and Le Figaro. This genre of songwriting followed on from writers of the previous generation such as Pierre-Jean de Béranger.

Many of his songs were political; his Pandore and Soldat du Marsala were both forbidden under the Second French Empire. Others were like simple folk songs, such as Carcassonne, which is the lament of a peasant who was never able to visit Carcassonne, a city on the Aude River near the Pyrenees, famous for its medieval fortress.

Although Nadaud wrote over 300 songs, he died in poverty. A college in Wattrelos in northern France is named after him.

He died in Passy, near Paris.

== Recordings ==
- Gustave Nadaud, Bouche à l'oreille et les autres nouveautés Arnaud Marzorati, Daniel Isoir (Alpha CD, 2010).
