= Fernando Carpi =

Italian opera singer

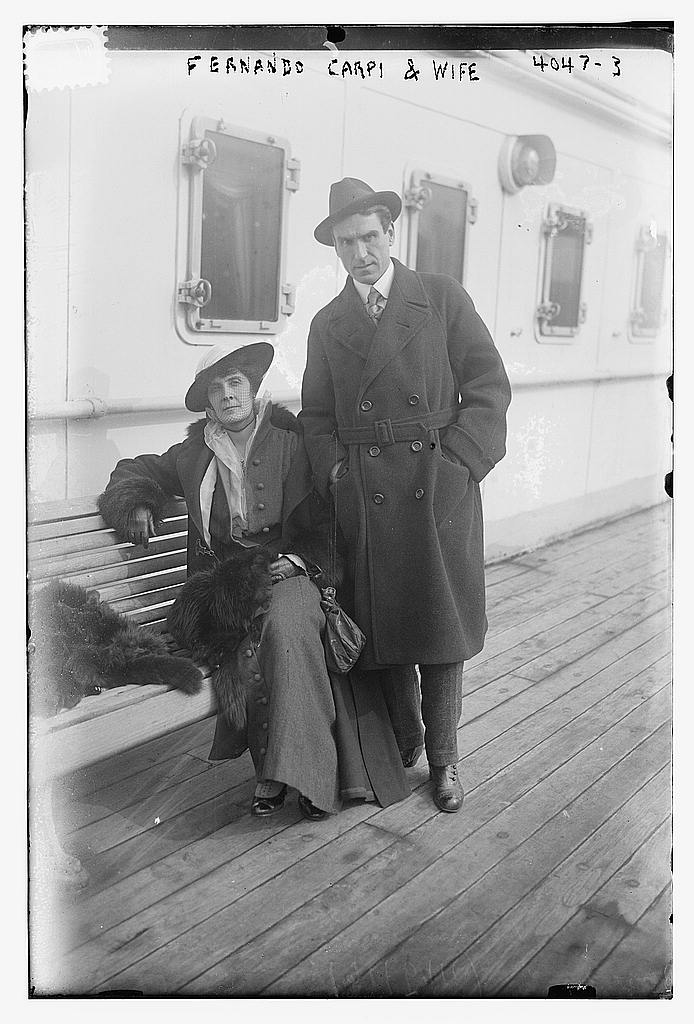
- Fernando Carpi and wife in 1916
- Born: 22 January 1876; Florence, Italy
- Died: 3 August 1959 (aged 83); Geneva, Switzerland
- Occupations: Opera singer (tenor); Professor of singing
- Years active: 1905–1954

Fernando Carpi (22 January 1876 – 3 August 1959) was an Italian operatic tenor and later professor of singing.

== Life and career ==
Carpi was born in Florence, Italy in 1876. and made his operatic debut in Lecce in 1898. In 1905 he was in the cast of Leoncavallo' Zazà of at the Teatro de Novedades in Barcelona and in June of that year sang the role of Ernesto in Don Pasquale at the Theatre of Liege. In 1907, he appeared as Walther von Stolzing in Die Meistersinger von Nürnberg at the Teatro Costanzi in Rome. By 1908, he was appearing at London's Royal Opera House in the title role of Gounod's Faust along with Pauline Donalda and Marcel Journet. In 1909 and in 1910, he sang at the Teatro Nacional de São Carlos in Lisbon.

After singing in Russia for two years, he returned to Italy in 1910, where he sang again at the Teatro Costanzi in Don Pasquale, alongside Giuseppe Kaschmann, Giuseppe De Luca and Rosina Storchio and in several other Italian opera houses. In March 1911, he sang the role of Enzo in Ponchielli's La Gioconda In 1913, he sang Elvino in Bellini's La sonnambula at the Teatro Regio di Torino with Rosina Storchio in a production conducted by Ettore Panizza. In May 1914, he appeared as at the Teatro Regio di Parma as Count Almaviva in The Barber of Seville, with Riccardo Stracciari, Graziella Pareto and Gaudio Mansueto. That same year he sang Alfredo in La traviata at the Teatro Comunale di Trieste, with Rosina Storchio as Violetta and Gabriele Santini conducting.

In February 1916 Carpi sang at the Paris Opera, again as Ernesto in Don Pasquale, with William Niola, Giuseppe Danise, and Elvira de Hidalgo. On 5 June 1916, he sang in The Barber of Seville at the Teatro Verdi in Pisa alongside Carlo Galeffi, Fanny Anitua, Joseph Kaschmann (Don Bartolo) and Nazzareno De Angelis (Don Basilio). He also sang at La Scala, Milan, with Titta Ruffo, Elvira de Hidalgo and Nazzareno De Angelis.

1916 also saw Carpi's debut at the Metropolitan Opera in New York singing Alfredo in La traviata. In 1917 he appeared there in the role of Tonio in La fille du régiment, with soprano Frieda Hempel and baritone Antonio Scotti and took part in gala concerts at the Met, with, among others, the soprano Claudia Muzio and the bass Jose Mardones. In 1918, still at the Met, sang Rodolfo in La bohème, with Frances Alda and Pinkerton in Madama Butterfly with Geraldine Farrar. In 1919, he gave recitals in New York City, and in 1920 gave recitals in New York City, and in New Rochelle. During that time, he also sang in Venezuela and on tour in South America in The Barber of Seville, with Amelita Galli Curci and Riccardo Stracciari.

In his later years Carpi became a noted singing teacher, first in Prague where his pupils Zinka Milanov, Suzanne Danco, Gwyneth Jones, and the baritone Rudolf Jedlicka, and then at the Geneva Conservatory where he was a professor of singing and taught Ernst Haefliger. He later returned to Italy to teach at the Conservatory of Genoa (among his pupils was the tenor Eric Tappy) and then in Milan where he continued to teach privately.

Carpi died on 3 August 1959 in Geneva, Switzerland.
