= The Barber of Seville (Paisiello) =

1782 opera by Giovanni Paisiello

Il barbiere di Siviglia
- Opera by Giovanni Paisiello
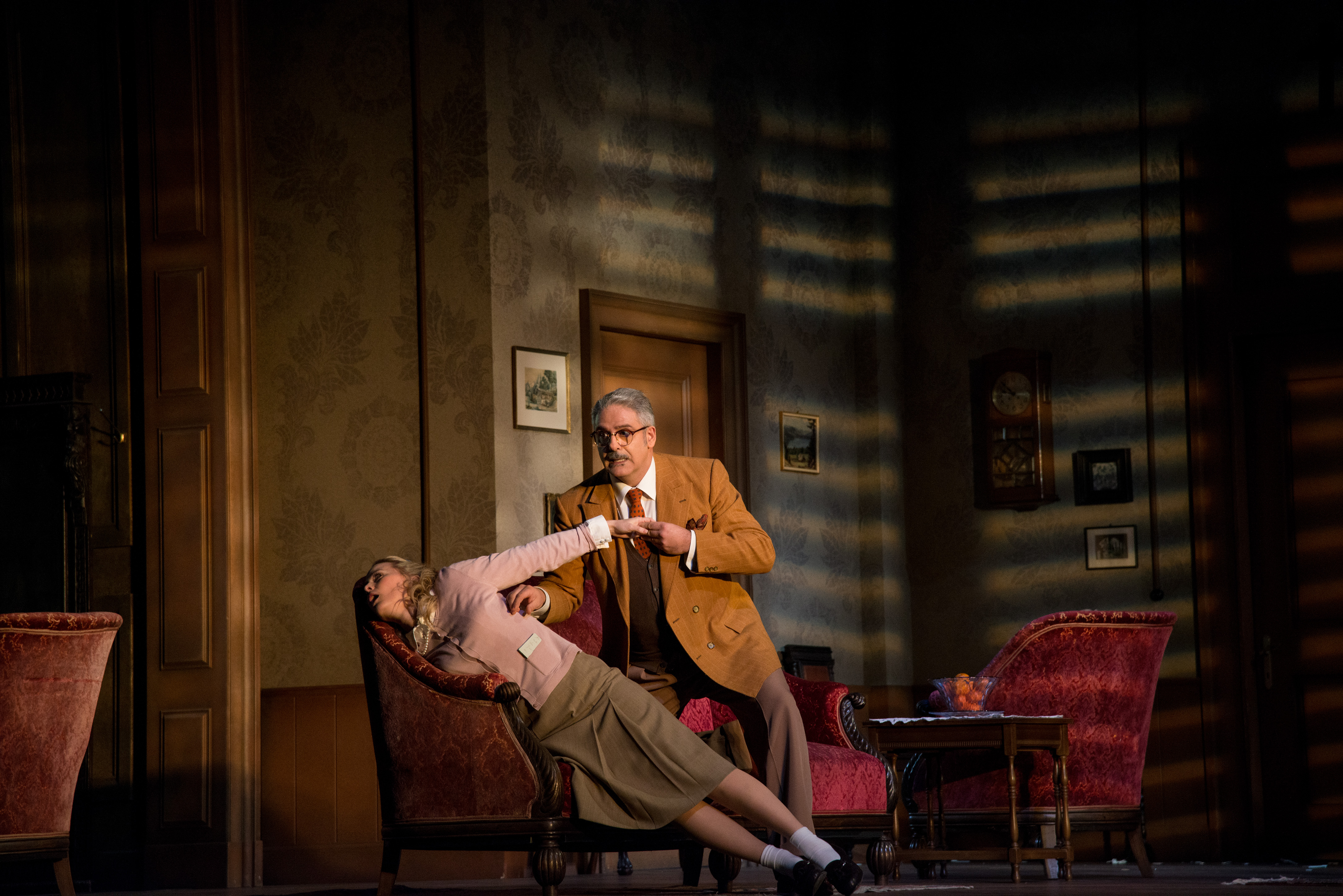
- A 2015 production at the Theater an der Wien, with Mari Eriksmoen and Pietro Spagnoli
- Description: dramma giocoso
- Translation: The Barber of Seville
- Librettist: Giuseppe Petrosellini
- Language: Italian
- Based on: Le Barbier de Séville by Pierre Beaumarchais
- Premiere: 26 September 1782; Imperial Court, Saint Petersburg

Il barbiere di Siviglia, ovvero La precauzione inutile (The Barber of Seville, or The Useless Precaution) is a comic opera by Giovanni Paisiello to a libretto by Giuseppe Petrosellini, even though his name is not identified on the score's title page.

The opera was first performed on 26 September [O.S. 15] 1782 at the Imperial Court, Saint Petersburg. It was adapted from the 1775 play Le Barbier de Séville of Pierre Beaumarchais. The full title for the opera reads: Il barbiere di Siviglia, ovvero La Precauzione inutile, dramma giocoso per musica tradotto liberamente dal francese, da rappresentarsi nel Teatro Imperiale del corte, l'anno 1782 (Trans: "The Barber of Seville, or The Useless Precaution, comical drama with music freely translated from the French, presented at the Imperial Court Theater, the year 1782").

The story essentially follows the original Beaumarchais play, and in some places directly translates songs and dialogue. The plots of the Paisiello and the Rossini versions very closely resemble each other, with subtle differences.

== Performance history ==
Several musical adaptations of Il barbiere di Siviglia predated the version by Paisiello, but Paisiello's comic opera was the first to achieve widespread success. It was subsequently staged in several cities in the years immediately following its premiere, including Vienna, where Il barbiere played at five venues from 1783 until 1804, both in Italian and German, and received nearly 100 performances, and Naples (1783); Warsaw, Prague, Versailles (1784); Kassel, Pressburg, Mannheim (1785); Liège, Cologne (1786); Madrid and Barcelona (1787); for the 1787 production in Naples at the Teatro dei Fiorentini, the opera was reduced to three acts and Paisiello wrote three new numbers: "La carta che bramate" for Rosina, "Serena il bel sembiante" for Almaviva, and a finale for act one. In 1788 the opera was given in Berlin, followed by London and Paris (1789); Lisbon (1791); Brussels (1793); Stockholm (1797); and New Orleans (1801).

In 1789, Mozart dedicated the aria "Schon lacht der holde Frühling" (K. 580) to his sister-in-law Josepha Hofer as a substitute for Rosina's original act 3 aria ("Già riede primavera"). Although it is missing only the closing ritornello, the incomplete orchestration suggests it was never used.

The opera proved to be Paisiello's biggest success. Even after the tumultuous 1816 premiere of Rossini's own version, Paisiello's version continued to be more popular by comparison. With time, however, that situation changed. As Rossini's version gained in popularity, Paisiello's diminished in parallel, to the point where it fell from the repertoire.

Paisiello's version did receive revival in later years, including Paris (1868); Turin (1875); Berlin (1913); and Monte Carlo (1918). Associate Artists Opera gave the first Boston performances in 1972 with David Evitts as Figaro, Alexander Stevenson as Almaviva, Kenneth Bell as Bartolo, Jo Ella Todd as Rosina, and Ernest Triplett as Basilio. The director was Nicholas Deutsch and the conductor was Robert Willoughby Jones. In 2005 Bampton Classical Opera gave performances of Paisiello's opera in English.

== Roles ==
Roles, voice types, premiere cast
Role	Voice type	Premiere cast, 26 September 1782
Count Almaviva	tenor	Guglielmo Jermolli
Rosina	soprano	Anna Davia de Bernucci
Don Bartolo	buffo	Baldassare Marchetti
Figaro	baritone	Giovanni Battista Brocchi
Don Basilio	bass	Luigi Pagnanelli
Giovinetto ('Youth', Bartolo's aged servant)	tenor	
Svegliato ('Vigilance', a sleepy servant)	bass	
Notary	bass	
Warden	tenor	
Quartets of Alguazili (constables) and servants

== Recordings ==
- Mercury SR 2-9010: Graziella Sciutti, Nicola Monti, Rolando Panerai, Renato Capecchi, Mario Petri; Virtuosi di Roma; Renato Fasano, conductor. Recorded at the Teatro Grande di Brescia, August 6-15, 1959
- Hungaroton SLPD MZS-27: Dénes Gulyas, Krisztina Laki, József Gregor, István Gáti, Sándor Sólyom-Nagy, Csaba Réti, Miklós Mersei, Gábor Vághelyi, Attila Fülöp; Hungarian State Orchestra; Ádám Fischer, conductor. 1985
- Frequenz 3-DAE: Lella Cuberli, Piero Visconti, Alessandro Corbelli, Enzo Dara, Delfo Menicucci; Romanian Philharmonic Orchestra; Bruno Campanella, conductor. Recorded at the Festival della Valle d’Itria, Martina Franca, July 22-26, 1982
- Dynamic S417: Stefano Consolini, Pietro Spagnoli, Anna Maria Dell'Oste, Angelo Nardinocchi, Luciano Di Pasquale; Orchestra del Teatro Lirico G.Verdi di Trieste; Giuliano Carella, conductor. 2000

== In popular culture ==
- The Count's serenade (cavatina) "Saper bramate" is used in Stanley Kubrick's period film Barry Lyndon (1975).
