= Clavigo (film) =

1970 film

- Based on: Clavigo by Goethe
- Written by: Fritz Kortner
- Directed by: Marcel Ophüls
- Starring: Thomas Holtzmann and Rolf Boysen
- Original language: German

Production
- Cinematography: Karlheinz Wüst
- Running time: 128 minutes

Original release
- Release: 1970

Clavigo is a West German 1970s television movie directed by Marcel Ophüls, based on the 1774 play Clavigo by Goethe. It is the film version of a play staged and directed by Fritz Kortner.

== Plot ==
The film follows the titular Clavigo, a young writer whose engagement to a French noblewoman allows the publication of his weekly magazine. His success leads him to fail to honor this engagement, and he suffers the consequences.

== Cast ==
- Thomas Holtzmann as Clavigo
- Rolf Boysen as Carlos
- Friedhelm Ptok as Beaumarchais
- Kyra Mladeck as Sophie
- Hans Hackermann as Guilbert
