= Figaro (New Orleans) =

American weekly magazine, 1883–1884

Figaro was an American weekly magazine published from 1883 to 1884 in New Orleans, with a focus on theater and politics. C. Vann Woodward notes that the magazine was "hostile to the unions".

There have been two later iterations of a magazine of that name in New Orleans. From 1972 to 1981, there was an alternative magazine under that name published by the Mercury Press, which covered entertainment, politics, and did investigative journalism. It was compared to the later Gambit Weekly. That magazine was slated to return as a quarterly in 1988.
