= The Barber of Seville (play) =

French play by Pierre Beaumarchais

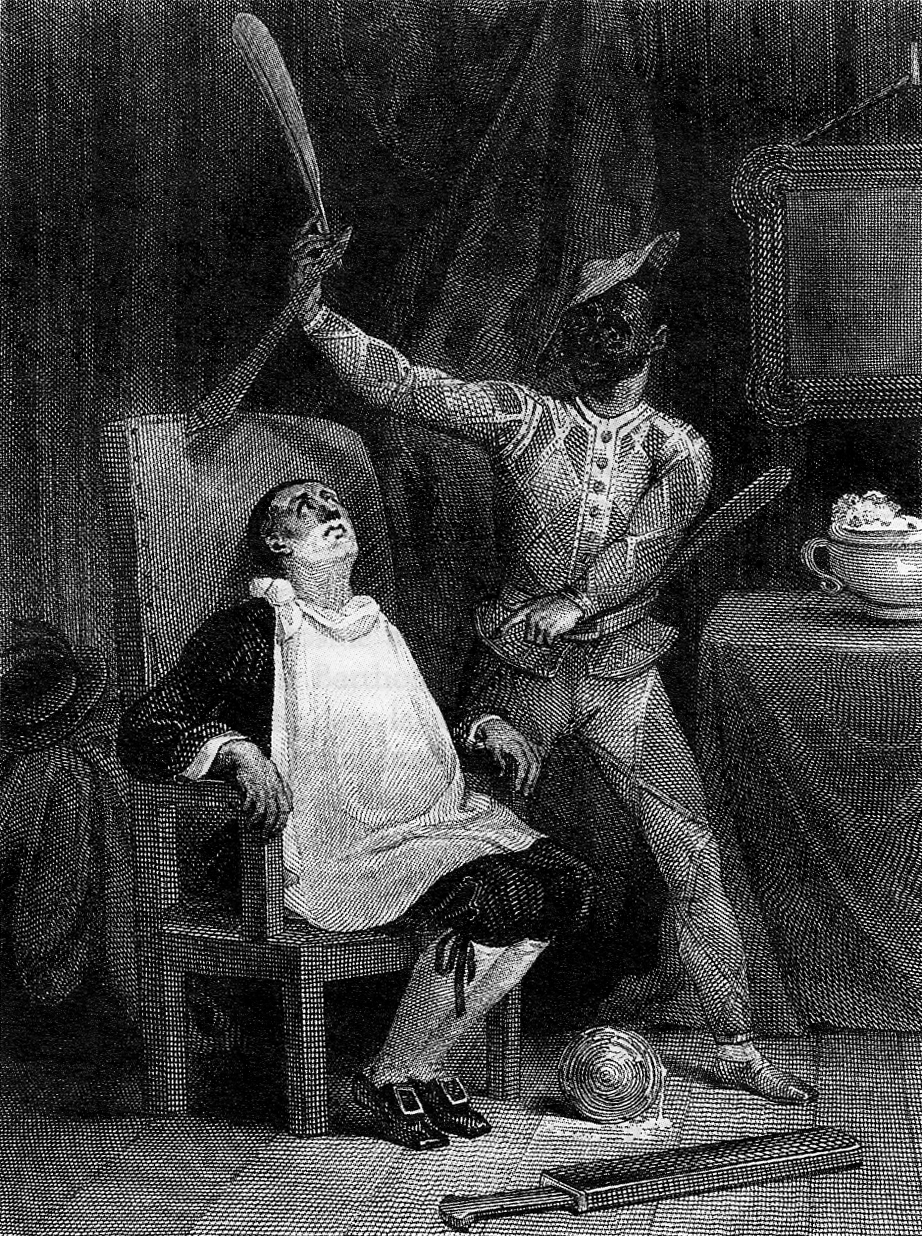
A scene from a 19th-century version of The Barber of Seville. Its origins in the commedia dell'arte are shown in this picture, which portrays Figaro dressed in the costume and mask of Harlequin.

The Barber of Seville or the Useless Precaution (French: Le Barbier de Séville ou la Précaution inutile) is a French play by Pierre Beaumarchais, with original music by Antoine-Laurent Baudron. It was initially conceived as an opéra comique, and was rejected as such in 1772 by the Comédie-Italienne. The play as it is now known was written in 1773, but, due to legal and political problems of the author, it was not performed until February 23, 1775, at the Comédie-Française in the Tuileries. It is the first play in a trilogy of which the other constituents are The Marriage of Figaro and The Guilty Mother.

Though the play was poorly received at first, Beaumarchais worked some fast editing of the script, turning it into a roaring success after three days. The play's title might be a pun on Tirso de Molina's earlier play El Burlador de Sevilla (The Trickster of Seville).

Mozart wrote a set of 12 variations, K. 354, on one of Baudron's songs, "Je suis Lindor".

== Synopsis ==
The story follows a traditional commedia dell'arte structure, with many characters seemingly based on famous stock characters. The plot involves a Spanish count, called simply The Count, although "Almaviva" appears as an additional name (whether it is a first name or a surname is not clear), who has fallen in love at first sight with a girl called Rosine. To ensure that she really loves him and not just his money, the Count disguises himself as a poor college student named Lindor, and attempts to woo her. His plans are foiled by Rosine's guardian, Doctor Bartholo, who keeps her locked up in his house and intends to marry her himself. The Count's luck changes, however, after a chance reunion with an ex-servant of his, Figaro, who is currently working as a barber and therefore has access to the Doctor's home. After being promised money, and afraid the Count will seek revenge on him if he refuses, Figaro devises a variety of ways for the Count and Rosine to meet and talk, first as Lindor, then as Alonzo, a fellow student of the same music master, Bazile. The story culminates in the marriage of the Count and Rosine.

== Characters ==
- Count Almaviva, a Spanish grandee who is in love with Rosine
- Figaro, barber of Seville
- Rosine, Don Bartholo's ward
- Don Bartholo, a doctor and Rosine's guardian
- Don Bazile, an organist who is Rosine's singing teacher
- La Jeunesse (Youth), Bartholo's elderly servant
- L'Éveillé (Livelihood), another servant of Bartholo who is very lazy
- A Notary
- An Alcalde

=== Act 1 ===
Scene: the street in front of Dr. Bartholo's house in Seville. The Count, disguised as a poor university student, waits in hope of catching a glimpse of Rosine, whom he encountered in Madrid and has followed to Seville. To this point they have never spoken to each other. Figaro happens to come down the street, singing a song ("Bannissons le chagrin"); he and the Count recognize each other. While the two men talk, Dr. Bartholo and Rosine come to a window of the house. Rosine pretends to drop a piece of sheet music from her window inadvertently. While the doctor is coming down the stairs to retrieve it, Rosine instructs the Count to pick up the sheet himself. He does, and finds a note from Rosine hidden inside it; in the note she asks him to explain who he is and why he has followed her to Seville, by way of singing his answer to the tune of the song. Figaro tells the Count that Rosine is the ward of Dr. Bartholo, and adds that as he is the doctor's barber and apothecary, he frequents the house. He proposes a plan to smuggle the Count into the house by disguising him as a drunken soldier in need of lodging.

The two are interrupted when they overhear Dr. Bartholo making plans to secretly marry Rosine during the night, before he leaves to see his friend Bazile, who is to make the arrangements. Afterwards, the Count sings to Rosine ("Vous l'ordonnez, je me ferai connaître... Je suis Lindor"), introducing himself as a poor man named Lindor who is in love with her. From inside the house, Rosine sings a verse to the tune of Maître en droit, requiting his affections, before she is caught by someone else inside and is forced to retreat. Figaro and the Count go their separate ways, agreeing to meet again to put their plan in action.

=== Act 2 ===
In Dr. Bartholo's house, Rosine writes a note to "Lindor". When Figaro drops in, she asks if he will deliver the note. Figaro agrees. The moment he steps out, Dr. Bartholo comes in, complaining that Figaro has given incapacitating medical treatments to all the servants. He notices ink stains on Rosine's fingers; suspicious, he demands to know what she wrote. When she continues to deny writing anything, he accuses Figaro of having seduced her. Rosine leaves. Figaro is shown to be hiding in a cabinet. He listens as Bartholo and Bazile discuss the inquiries Count Almaviva has been making all over town about Rosine. They hatch a plan to spread malicious gossip about the Count so that if he ever should find her, she will be too disgusted with him to want to form a relationship.

They leave. Figaro goes to Rosine and warns her that Bartholo plans to force her to marry him before morning. At this point the Count enters disguised as an inebriated soldier, and sings a song to the tune of "Vive le vin". He presents a forged lodging billet. The doctor explains he is exempted from the law that requires people to lodge soldiers. When he goes to find the paperwork that certifies this, the Count slips a note to Rosine. The doctor returns and sends the Count away. He sees Rosine with the note and demands she show it to him; but she is able to switch it with an innocent letter that extinguishes Bartholo's fears. Rosine reads the actual note, which contains instructions for her to start a fight with Bartholo.

=== Act 3 ===
The Count comes to the house again, disguised this time as a teacher. He tells Bartholo that Bazile is sick and has sent him as a substitute to give Rosine her music lesson for the day. Rosine enters pretending to be quite angry, having chosen the music lesson as an excuse to pick a fight with Bartholo. She recognizes the Count ("Lindor") and becomes calm. The Count accompanies Rosine on the piano as she sings ("Quand, dans la plaine"). Lulled by the music, Bartholo keeps falling asleep; each time he does so the Count begins kissing Rosine, the music stops and the Doctor wakes up, forcing Rosine and the Count to scurry back to their music, and the lazzo repeats. After the lesson, the doctor sings his own song to Rosine ("Veux-tu, ma Rosinette"). Figaro arrives and tries to distract Dr. Bartholo by shaving him so that Rosine and the Count will be alone together, but Bartholo catches on, especially when Bazile arrives to give Rosine her music lesson. The Count discreetly hands Bazile a bag of money, bribing him to play along, and they are able to settle the doctor's fears once more. The Count tells Rosine he will return at night to visit.

=== Act 4 ===
The stage is dark and music suggesting a lightning storm is played. Bazile admits to Bartholo what happened earlier in the day, and speculates that the man in the house may have been the Count. He advises against Bartholo's plan to force a marriage with Rosine, but Bartholo takes no heed. Rosine then comes out, looking for the Count; Bartholo goes to her and tells her that the man in the house was working for a notorious womanizing count named Almaviva, who plans to have his agents kidnap her. Rosine believes this story and becomes outraged. She agrees to marry Bartholo, and he goes out to find a judge to perform the marriage ceremony. Rosine runs to lock herself in Marceline's room to avoid the impending abduction she expects.

Figaro and the Count break into the house, discussing the Count's plan to propose marriage to Rosine, and worrying about how to break the news that he is really a count. Rosine comes back out to yell at him, and tell him she knows all about his horrible scheme to kidnap her: she notices that Figaro keeps addressing him as "my lord", however, and inquires as to the reason. The Count then reveals his true identity, and Rosine forgives him. The Judge enters, and the Count takes him and has him draw up a marriage contract between himself and Rosine. Bartholo comes in just a moment after it is signed, and after making some futile arguments against the contract's validity, resigns himself. As a consolation he is given Rosine's dowry money to keep.

== Operas ==
Beaumarchais's play has been adapted into several operas, most of them forgotten today. Giovanni Paisiello's The Barber of Seville, dramma giocoso in four acts first performed in 1782, is probably the earliest opera adaptation still occasionally heard in the repertoire. The most famous opera adaptation is Gioachino Rossini's The Barber of Seville, commedia in two acts premiered in 1816. Despite the opera’s disastrous premiere, its popularity even overshadows Beaumarchais' original play. Other lesser-known adaptions include those by Alexander Reinagle and Samuel Arnold, both in 1794, Nicolas Isouard in 1796, and Francesco Morlacchi in 1816.

== Character of Figaro ==
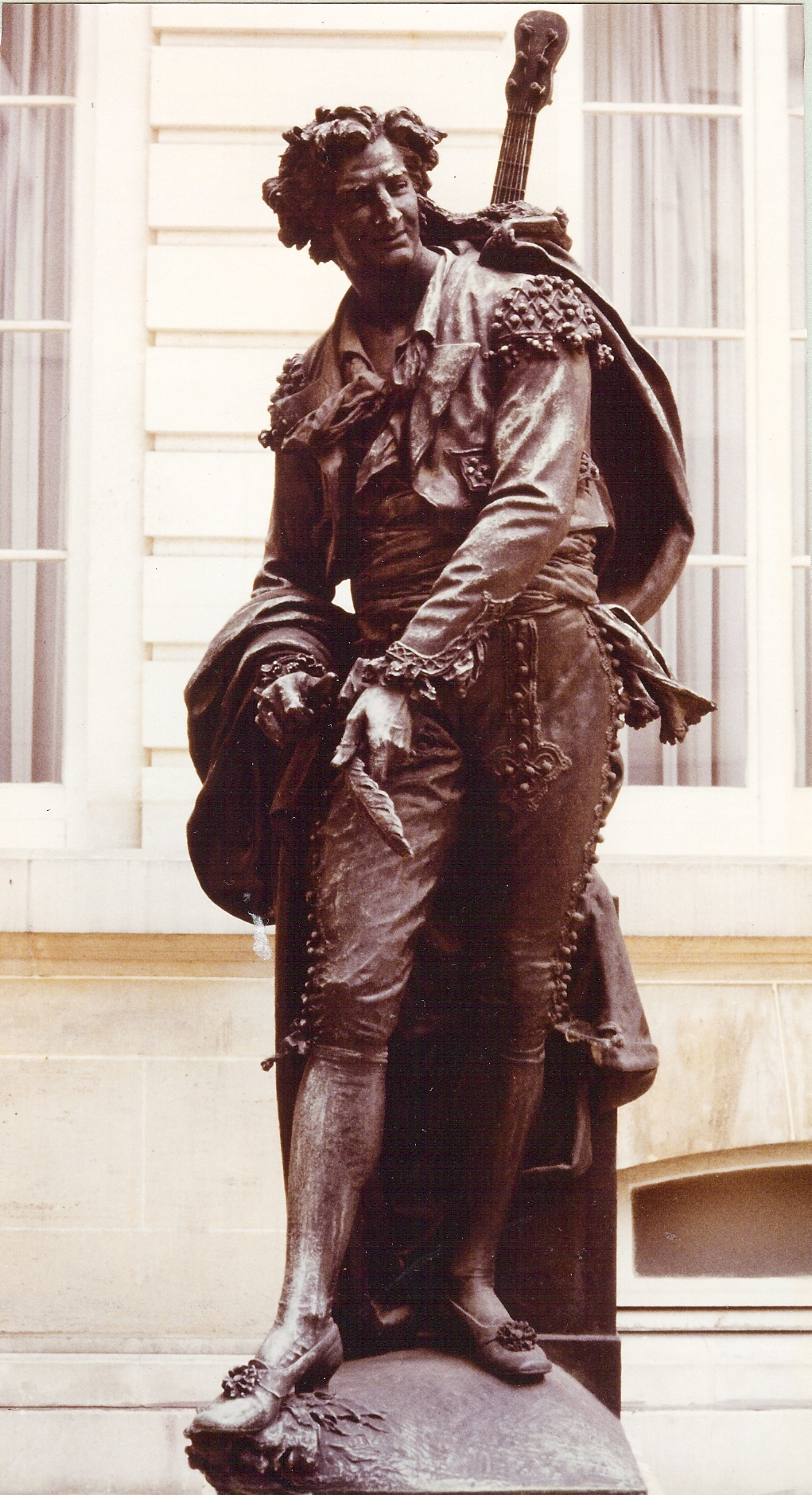
Statue of Figaro (1873) by Jean Barnabé Amy

Figaro is inspired by the commedia dell'arte character of Brighella, and like his predecessor he is a clever liar; moral and yet unscrupulous; good humored, helpful and brave, though somewhat embittered and cynical. As he says in The Barber of Seville: "I must force myself to laugh at everything lest I be obliged to weep." Though he is normally calm, collected and intelligent, he can be irrational when angered. The name "Figaro" was invented by Beaumarchais for this character, and it has been theorized by Frédéric Grendel that it is made from a phonetic transcription of the words "fils Caron" (Caron having been the given surname of the playwright).

The role was created in The Barber of Seville by Beaumarchais's friend Préville. When The Marriage of Figaro went into production almost a decade later, however, he felt himself too old to repeat the part and turned it over to fellow actor Jean Dazincourt.

According to the information Figaro gives at various points throughout the plays, his life story appears to be thus: he was the illegitimate son of Dr. Bartholo and his maid Marceline, and presumably therefore given his mother's family name, was born Emmanuel de Verte-Allure. He was kidnapped as a baby and raised by gypsies, who are probably the ones that renamed him Figaro. After he grew "disgusted with their ways" he left to become a surgeon, and apparently took up a short-term job in the household of Count Almaviva during this time to support himself. Though the Count referred to him as a "rather bad servant," he was pleased enough with Figaro to write him a recommendation to the Bureau in Madrid, where he was given a job as an assistant veterinary surgeon, much to his disappointment. While working there, he began dabbling in a literary career, apparently with great success. He was fired from the Bureau but stayed on in Madrid for a time trying to work as a publisher and playwright. He angered the censors with several of his works, and was briefly imprisoned. Eventually he gave up writing, and set himself up as a barber surgeon. After "pensively proceeding through the two Castilles, la Mancha, Extremadura, the Sierra Morena, and Andalusia" he set up shop in Seville, where he became reacquainted with Count Almaviva, and after assisting him with some romantic troubles, was hired as the Count's personal valet. He evidently retains this position for the remainder of his life. It is after he returns to work for the Count that he marries Suzanne, though at what point he met her is unclear. Given that Suzanne's uncle Antonio works for the Count, it seems likely she was hired on his recommendation when the Countess moved into the palace and a maid was needed for her, in which case she and Figaro would have met after the events of The Barber of Seville.

In The Barber of Seville, Rosine claims that Figaro has a daughter, but because this is never mentioned again by any other characters or in the other plays, and because it comes up during a lie Rosine tells to conceal her relationship with the Count, it is probable that she made this up. In The Guilty Mother, the children of the Count and Countess are named, but no offspring from Figaro or Suzanne are referenced, which suggests they remain childless.

== Sources ==
- The Figaro Trilogy: a new translation by David Coward, Oxford World's Classics
- The Barber of Seville and The Marriage of Figaro, Penguin Classics
- The Italian Comedy, Dover
- Opera and the Enlightenment, Cambridge University Press
