= The Marriage of Figaro (play) =

French play by Pierre Beaumarchais

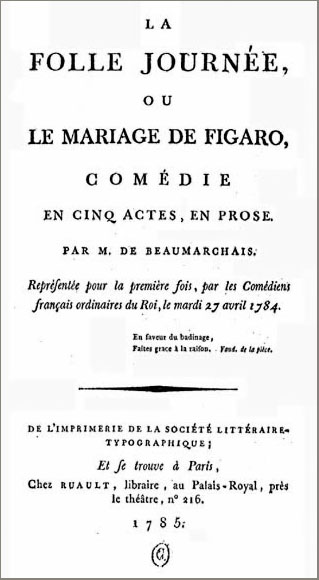
- Title page from the first edition of The Marriage of Figaro
- Original language: French
- Written by: Pierre-Augustin de Beaumarchais
- Characters: Figaro; Count Almaviva; The Countess; Suzanne; Marceline; Chérubin; Antonio; Fanchette; Bartholo
- Genre: Romantic comedy
- Setting: The Count's castle near Seville

Premiere
- Date: 1784
- Place: France

The Marriage of Figaro (French: La Folle Journée, ou Le Mariage de Figaro ("The Mad Day, or The Marriage of Figaro")) is a comedy in five acts, written in 1778 by Pierre-Augustin de Beaumarchais. This play is the second in the Figaro trilogy, preceded by The Barber of Seville and followed by The Guilty Mother.

In the first play, The Barber, the story begins with a simple love triangle in which a Spanish count has fallen in love with a girl called Rosine. He disguises himself to ensure that she will love him back for his character, not his wealth. But this is all foiled when Rosine's guardian, Doctor Bartholo, who wants her hand in marriage, confines her to the house. The Count runs into an ex-servant of his (now a barber), Figaro, and pressures him into setting up a meeting between the Count and Rosine. He succeeds and the lovers are married to end the first part of the trilogy.

The Marriage was written as a sequel to The Barber. In his preface to the play, Beaumarchais says that Louis François, Prince of Conti, had requested it. The play's denunciation of aristocratic privilege has been characterised as foreshadowing the French Revolution. The revolutionary leader Georges Danton said that the play "killed off the nobility"; in exile, Napoleon Bonaparte called it "the Revolution already put into action."

Thanks to the great popularity of its predecessor, The Marriage of Figaro opened to enormous success; it was said to have grossed 100,000 francs in the first twenty showings, and the theatre was so packed that three people were reportedly crushed to death in the opening-night crowd.

The play formed the basis for an opera with a libretto by Lorenzo Da Ponte and music by Mozart, also called The Marriage of Figaro (1786). In 1799, another opera based on the same play, La pazza giornata, ovvero Il matrimonio di Figaro, was produced in Venice with a libretto by Gaetano Rossi and music by Marcos Portugal.

== Summary ==
The Marriage of Figaro picks up three years following the end of The Barber of Seville as Figaro is engaged to be married to Suzanne; both characters are among the Count's staff in his household. In the three years since Figaro helped forge the marriage of the Count and Rosine, the Count has already grown bored with his marriage and is taking notice of Suzanne. The Count looks to re-engage the act of primae noctis, in which he would consummate the marriage with the bride-to-be prior to Figaro's honeymoon.

== Production history ==
The scholar and translator John Wood writes that the play was probably completed in more or less its existing form by 1778. It was accepted for production by the management of the Comédie Française in 1781, after which three years elapsed before it was publicly staged. Initially the text was approved, with minor changes, by the official censor, but at a private reading before the French court the play so shocked King Louis XVI that he forbade its public presentation. Beaumarchais revised the text, moving the action from France to Spain, and after further scrutiny by the censor the piece was played to an audience including members of the Royal Family in September 1783. The censors still refused to license the play for public performance, but the king personally authorised its production.

Under the title of La Folle Journée, ou Le Mariage de Figaro, the play opened at the Théâtre Français on 27 April 1784 and ran for 68 consecutive performances, earning higher box-office receipts than any other French play of the eighteenth century. The author gave his share of the profits to charity.

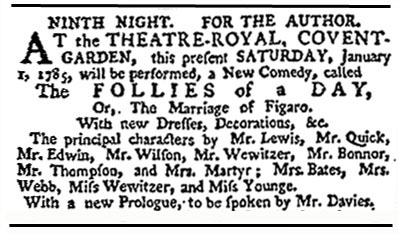
Advertisement for the first English production, which opened in December 1784

The play was translated into English by Thomas Holcroft, and under the title of The Follies of a Day – Or The Marriage of Figaro it was produced at the Theatre Royal, Covent Garden in London in late 1784 and early 1785. In France the play has held its place in the repertory, and leading companies have played it in the original language to audiences in Europe and America. In 1960 a Comédie Française production was filmed, under the direction of Jean Mayer, with Jean Piat as Figaro.

In the twentieth century the play continued to be staged in translation by foreign companies. In 1927 Constantin Stanislavski staged the work at the Moscow Art Theatre; (Note: Stanislavsky relocated the action in pre-Revolutionary France and trimmed its five-act structure to eleven scenes, employing a revolve to quicken scene-changes. Aleksandr Golovin designed the production. It was a great success, garnering ten curtain calls on opening night. Thanks to the cohesive unity and rhythmic qualities of the production, it is recognised as one of Stanislavski's major achievements.) in 1974 the British National Theatre company presented a version by John Wells, directed by Jonathan Miller.

Beaumarchais' comedy was adapted into One Mad Day! a "screwball comedy" in Three Acts by William James Royce. The play premiered at the Norton Clapp Theatre on 24 October 2008. In 1984 BBC Radio 3 broadcast a production of Beaumarchais' play in John Wells's translation; in December 2010 the same station transmitted a new version, adapted and directed by David Timson.

== Characters ==
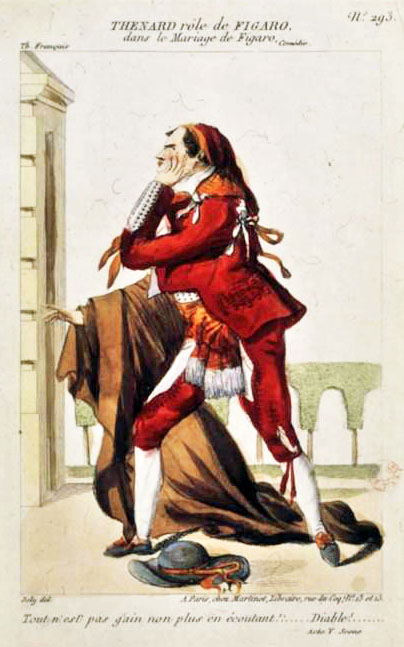
Costume design for Figaro (1807 production)

- :Count Almaviva, Governor of Andalusia
- :Countess Rosine, his wife
- :Figaro, the Count's valet and major-domo; engaged to Suzanne
- :Suzanne, the Countess' maid; engaged to Figaro
- :Marceline, the housekeeper; in love with Figaro, unknowingly Figaro's mother
- :Antonio, gardener of the castle; uncle of Suzanne, father of Fanchette
- :Fanchette, daughter of Antonio, girlfriend to many
- :Chérubin, the Count's page, the Countess' godson; in love with every woman
- :Bartholo, a doctor from Seville; unknowingly Figaro's father
- :Bazile, music master to the Countess
- :Don Guzman Brid'oison, a judge.
- :Doublemain, clerk to Don Guzman Brid'oison
- :Gripe-Soleil, a shepherd lad
- :Pedrillo, the Count's huntsman
- :An usher
- :A shepherdess
- :An alguazil
- :A magistrate
- :Servants, valets, peasants, and huntsmen

Beaumarchais wrote detailed notes on the characters, printed in the first published text of the play, issued in 1785. The author prescribed that Figaro must be played without any suggestion of caricature; the Count with great dignity yet with grace and affability; the Countess with restrained tenderness; Suzanne as intelligent and lively but without brazen gaiety; Chérubin as a charming young scamp, diffident only in the presence of the Countess. Chérubin is traditionally played as a trouser role by a woman. Beaumarchais said that in the original company, there were no boys available who were both the right age and who could understand all the subtleties of the role: most of the character's comic traits come from the view of an adult looking back on puberty with amusement.

The ridiculous character of Don Guzman was a jab at a judge, Louis Valentin Goëzman, whom Beaumarchais had—in vain—tried to bribe once, offering jewels to his wife and money to his secretary. Beaumarchais gained public acclaim for directly challenging the judge in a series of pamphlets collectively published as Mémoires dans l'affaire Goëzman. Beaumarchais was hailed as a hero of the people with the public embarrassment he brought upon Goëzman. (Note: In the aftermath of these events Beaumarchais was stripped of his civil rights in 1773. He eventually regained them by pledging allegiance to Louis XV and Louis XVI and carrying out secret missions for the government. His rights were restored in 1778)

Fanchette is around twelve years old. At the time, the age of consent throughout most of Europe was around that same age; hence, the revelation that she and the adult Count are sleeping together was not meant to be quite as shocking as it is often perceived these days.

== Synopsis ==
The play is set at the castle of Aguas Frescas, three leagues from Seville.

=== Act I ===
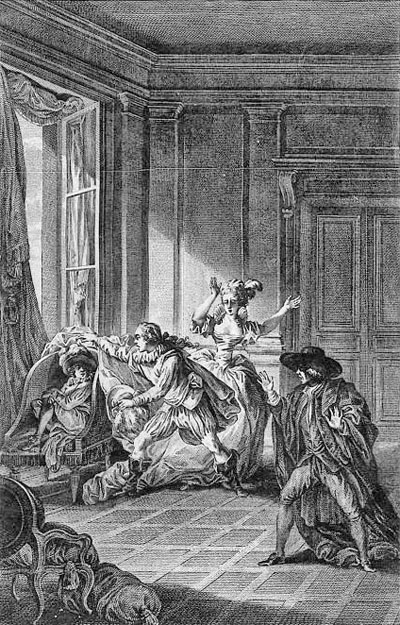
1785 print showing the Count discovering Chérubin in Suzanne's bedroom

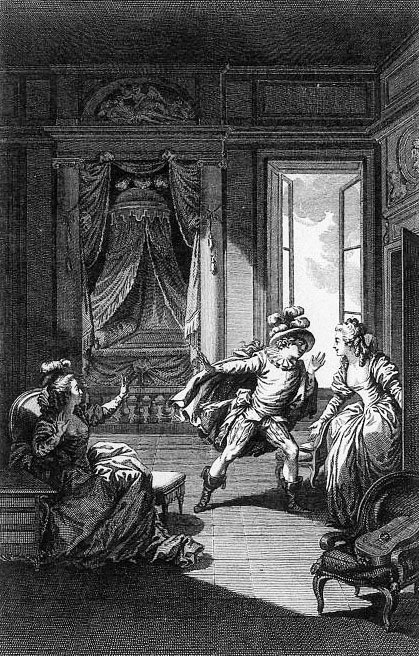
The Countess, Chérubin and Suzanne in Act II

The play begins in a room in the Count's castle—the bedroom to be shared by Figaro and Suzanne after their wedding, which is set to occur later that day. Suzanne reveals to Figaro her suspicion that the Count gave them this particular room because it is so close to his own, and that the Count has been pressing her to begin an affair with him. Figaro at once goes to work trying to find a solution to this problem. Then Dr. Bartholo and Marceline pass through, discussing a lawsuit they are to file against Figaro, who owes Marceline a good deal of money and has promised to marry her if he fails to repay the sum; his marriage to Suzanne will potentially void the contract. Bartholo relishes the news that Rosine is unhappy in her marriage, and they discuss the expectation that the Count will take Figaro's side in the lawsuit if Suzanne should submit to his advances. Marceline herself is in love with Figaro, and hopes to discourage Suzanne from this.

After a brief confrontation between Marceline and Suzanne, a young pageboy named Chérubin comes to tell Suzanne that he has been dismissed for being caught hiding in the bedroom of Fanchette, the gardener's daughter. The conversation is interrupted by the entrance of the Count, and since Suzanne and Chérubin do not want to be caught alone in a bedroom together, Chérubin hides behind an armchair. When the Count enters, he propositions Suzanne (who continues to refuse to sleep with him). They are then interrupted by Bazile's entrance. Again, not wanting to be found in a bedroom with Suzanne, the Count hides behind the armchair. Chérubin is forced to throw himself on top of the armchair so the Count will not find him, and Suzanne covers him with a dress so Bazile cannot see him. Bazile stands in the doorway and begins to tell Suzanne all the latest gossip. When he mentions a rumour that there is a relationship between the Countess and Chérubin, the Count becomes outraged and stands up, revealing himself. The Count justifies his firing Chérubin to Bazile and the horrified Suzanne (now worried that Bazile will believe that she and the Count are having an affair). The Count re-enacts finding Chérubin behind the door in Fanchette's room by lifting the dress covering Chérubin, accidentally uncovering Chérubin's hiding spot for the second time. The Count is afraid that Chérubin will reveal the earlier conversation in which he was propositioning Suzanne, and so decides to send him away at once as a soldier. Figaro then enters with the Countess, who is still oblivious to her husband's plans. A troupe of wedding guests enters with him, intending to begin the wedding ceremony immediately. The Count is able to persuade them to hold it back a few more hours, giving himself more time to enact his plans.

=== Act II ===
The scene is the Countess's bedroom. Suzanne has just broken the news of the Count's action to the Countess, who is distraught. Figaro enters and tells them that he has set in motion a new plan to distract the Count from his intentions toward Suzanne by starting a false rumour that the Countess is having an affair and that her lover will appear at the wedding; this, he hopes, will motivate the Count to let the wedding go ahead. Suzanne and the Countess have doubts about the effectiveness of the plot; they decide to tell the Count that Suzanne has agreed to his proposal, and then to embarrass him by sending out Chérubin dressed in Suzanne's gown to meet him. They stop Chérubin from leaving and begin to dress him, but just when Suzanne steps out of the room, the Count comes in. Chérubin hides, half dressed, in the adjoining dressing room while the Count grows increasingly suspicious, especially after having just heard Figaro's rumour of the Countess's affair. He leaves to get tools to break open the dressing room door, giving Chérubin enough time to escape through the window and Suzanne time to take his place in the dressing room; when the Count opens the door, it appears that Suzanne was inside there all along. Just when it seems he calms down, the gardener Antonio runs in screaming that a half-dressed man just jumped from the Countess's window. The Count's fears are settled again once Figaro takes credit to being the jumper, claiming that he started the rumour of the Countess having an affair as a prank and that while he was waiting for Suzanne he became frightened of the Count's wrath, jumping out the window in terror. Just then Marceline, Bartholo and the judge Brid'oison come to inform Figaro that his trial is starting.

=== Act III ===
Figaro and the Count exchange a few words, until Suzanne, at the insistence of the Countess, goes to the Count and tells him that she has decided that she will begin an affair with him, and asks he meet her after the wedding. The Countess has actually promised to appear at the assignation in Suzanne's place. The Count is glad to hear that Suzanne has seemingly decided to go along with his advances, but his mood sours again once he hears her talking to Figaro and saying it was only done so they might win the case.

Court is then held, and after a few minor cases, Figaro's trial occurs. Much is made of the fact that Figaro has no middle or last name, and he explains that it is because he was kidnapped as a baby and doesn't know his real name. The Count rules in Marceline's favour, effectively forcing Figaro to marry her, when Marceline suddenly recognizes a birthmark (or scar or tattoo; the text is unclear) in the shape of a spatule (lobster) on Figaro's arm—he is her son, and Dr. Bartholo is his father. Just then Suzanne runs in with enough money to repay Marceline, given to her by the Countess. At this, the Count storms off in outrage.

Figaro is thrilled to have rediscovered his parents, but Suzanne's uncle, Antonio, insists that Suzanne cannot marry Figaro now, because he is illegitimate. Marceline and Bartholo are persuaded to marry in order to correct this problem.

=== Act IV ===
Figaro and Suzanne talk before the wedding, and Figaro tells Suzanne that if the Count still thinks she is going to meet him in the garden later, she should just let him stand there waiting all night. Suzanne promises, but the Countess grows upset when she hears this news, thinking that Suzanne is in the Count's pocket and is wishing she had kept their rendezvous a secret. As she leaves, Suzanne falls to her knees, and agrees to go through with the plan to trick the Count. Together they write a note to him entitled "A New Song on the Breeze" (a reference to the Countess's old habit of communicating with the Count through sheet music dropped from her window), which tells him that she will meet him under the chestnut trees. The Countess lends Suzanne a pin from her dress to seal the letter, but as she does so, the ribbon from Chérubin falls out of the top of her dress. At that moment, Fanchette enters with Chérubin disguised as a girl, a shepherdess, and girls from the town to give the Countess flowers. As thanks, the Countess kisses Chérubin on the forehead. Antonio and the Count enter—Antonio knows Chérubin is disguised because they dressed him at his daughter's (Fanchette's) house. The Countess admits to hiding Chérubin in her room earlier and the Count is about to punish him. Fanchette suddenly admits that she and the Count have been having an affair, and that, since he has promised he will give her anything she desires, he must not punish Chérubin but give him to her as a husband. Later, the wedding is interrupted by Bazile, who had wished to marry Marceline himself; but once he learns that Figaro is her son he is so horrified that he abandons his plans. Later, Figaro witnesses the Count opening the letter from Suzanne, but thinks nothing of it. After the ceremony, he notices Fanchette looking upset, and discovers that the cause is her having lost the pin that was used to seal the letter, which the Count had told her to give back to Suzanne. Figaro nearly faints at the news, believing Suzanne's secret communication means that she has been unfaithful and, restraining tears, he announces to Marceline that he is going to seek vengeance on both the Count and Suzanne.

=== Act V ===
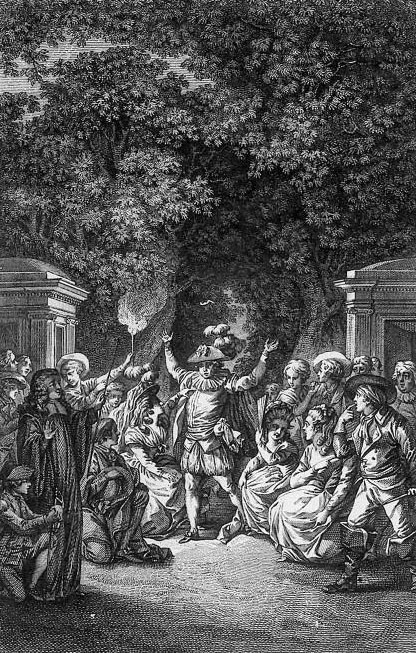
1785 print showing Act V of the play

In the castle gardens beneath a grove of chestnut trees, Figaro has called together a group of men and instructs them to call together everyone they can find: he intends to have them all walk in on the Count and Suzanne in flagrante delicto, humiliating the pair and also ensuring ease of obtaining a divorce. After a tirade against the aristocracy and the unhappy state of his life, Figaro hides nearby. The Countess and Suzanne then enter, each dressed in the other's clothes. They are aware that Figaro is watching, and Suzanne is upset that her husband would doubt her so much as to think she would ever really be unfaithful to him. Soon afterward the Count comes, and the disguised Countess goes off with him. Figaro is outraged, and goes to the woman he thinks is the Countess to complain; he realises that he is talking to his own wife Suzanne, who scolds him for his lack of confidence in her. Figaro agrees that he was being stupid, and they are quickly reconciled. Just then the Count comes out and sees what he thinks is his own wife kissing Figaro, and races to stop the scene. At this point, all the people who had been instructed to come on Figaro's orders arrive, and the real Countess reveals herself. The Count falls to his knees and begs her for forgiveness, which she grants. After all other loose ends are tied up, the cast breaks into song before the curtain falls.

=== Figaro's speech ===
One of the defining moments of the play—and Louis XVI's particular objection to the piece—is Figaro's long monologue in the fifth act, directly challenging the Count:

No, my lord Count, you shan't have her... you shall not have her! Just because you are a great nobleman, you think you are a great genius—Nobility, fortune, rank, position! How proud they make a man feel! What have you done to deserve such advantages? Put yourself to the trouble of being born—nothing more. For the rest—a very ordinary man! Whereas I, lost among the obscure crowd, have had to deploy more knowledge, more calculation and skill merely to survive than has sufficed to rule all the provinces of Spain for a century!

[...]
I throw myself full-force into the theatre. Alas, I might as well have put a stone round my neck! I fudge up a play about the manners of the Seraglio; a Spanish author, I imagined, could attack Mahomet without scruple; but immediately some envoy from goodness-knows-where complains that some of my lines offend the Sublime Porte, Persia, some part or other of the East Indies, the whole of Egypt, the kingdoms of Cyrenaica, Tripoli, Tunis, Algiers and Morocco. Behold my comedy scuppered to please a set of Mohammedan princes—not one of whom I believe can read—who habitually beat a tattoo on our shoulders to the tune of "Down with the Christian dogs!" Unable to break my spirit, they decided to take it out on my body. My cheeks grew hollowed: my time was out. I saw in the distance the approach of the fell sergeant, his quill stuck into his wig.
[...]

I'd tell him that stupidities acquire importance only in so far as their circulation is restricted, that unless there is liberty to criticize, praise has no value, and that only trivial minds are apprehensive of trivial scribbling.

== Awards and nominations ==
=== Original Broadway production ===
Year	Award	Category	Nominee	Result
1986	Tony Award	Best Scenic Design	Beni Montresor	Nominated
1986	Tony Award	Best Costume Design	Beni Montresor	Nominated

== Notes and references ==
Notes

== Sources ==
- Beaumarchais, Pierre. "Preface to The Marriage of Figaro", The Tulane Drama Review 2.2 (1958) (subscription required)
- Benedetti, Jean (1999). Stanislavski: His Life and Art. London: Methuen. ISBN 0-413-52520-1.
- Coward, David (trans and intro) (2003). The Figaro Trilogy. Oxford: Oxford University Press. ISBN 0192804138. (online version contains no page numbering)
- Fehér, Ferenc (1990). The French Revolution and the Birth of Modernity. Berkeley: University of California Press. ISBN 0520068793.
- Fisher, Burton D (2001). "Introduction." The Marriage of Figaro. Baton Rouge, FL: Opera Classics Library. ISBN 1930841825.
- Holden, Joan (2006). The Marriage of Figaro. New York: Dramatists Play Service. ISBN 0822221330.
- John, Nicholas, ed. (1983). The Marriage of Figaro/Le Nozze di Figaro – Volume 17 of English National Opera Guides. London: John Calder. ISBN 0714537713.
- Las Cases, Emmanuel-Auguste-Dieudonné, Comte de (1855). Memoirs of the Life, Exile, and Conversations of the Emperor Napoleon, Volume 3. New York: Redfield. OCLC 603091252.
- Nagler, Alois Maria (1959). A Source Book in Theatrical History. Mineola NY: Dover. OCLC 221870855.
- Wilson, Edwin; Alvin Goldfarb (2008). Living Theatre: History of the Theatre. Boston: McGraw-Hill. ISBN 978-0822221333.
- Wood, John (trans and intro) (1964). The Barber of Seville and The Marriage of Figaro. Harmondsworth: Penguin Classics. OCLC 58897211.
