= The Guilty Mother =

French play by Pierre Beaumarchais

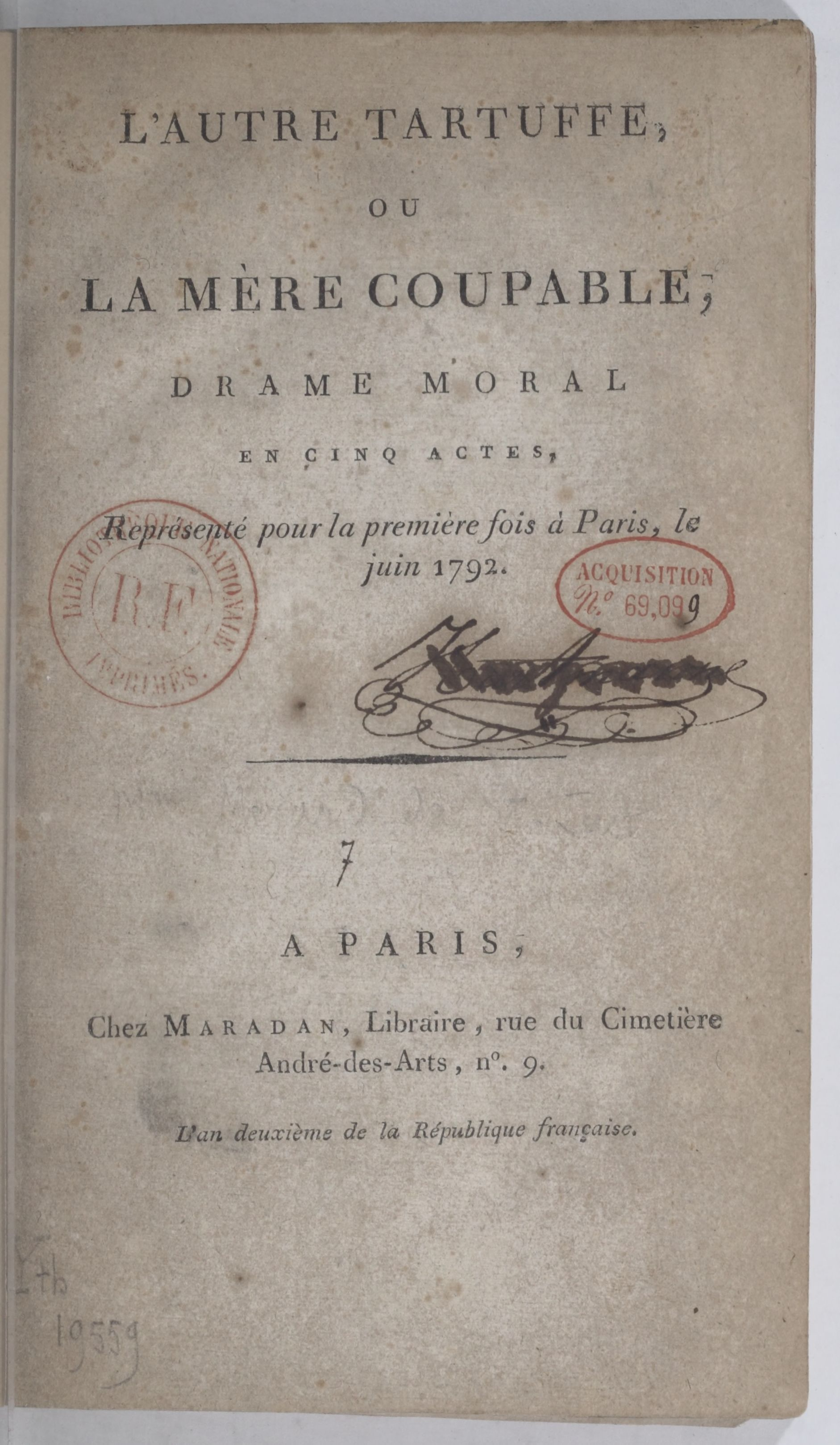
Title page of the Bibliothèque nationale de France copy of the first published edition of the play, 1793

The Guilty Mother (French: La Mère coupable, pronounced [la mɛʁ kupabl]), subtitled The Other Tartuffe, is a drame moral, the third play of the Figaro trilogy by Pierre Beaumarchais; its predecessors were The Barber of Seville and The Marriage of Figaro. Like the earlier plays of the trilogy it has been turned into operatic form, but it has not entered the general opera repertoire. This was the author's last play.

== Background ==
The characters of Figaro and his associates were so popular that other dramatists had written sequels to The Barber of Seville and The Marriage of Figaro, most notably Alexandre Delon, who brought out Le Mariage de Cherubin in 1785 and Le Mariage de Fanchette the following year. In the preface to the first published edition of The Marriage of Figaro, Beaumarchais had declared his intention of writing a sequel.

The Tartuffe figure referenced in the subtitle, who insinuates himself into the household for his own enrichment, is called Bégearss. Like Molière's original, he gains such influence over the head of the household that even when the latter finally understands the deception, the intruder is so firmly in control of the family's affairs that is only with difficulty that he is defeated. (Note: The original Tartuffe is brought down by the (offstage) intervention of the king as a deus ex machina; Bégearss's downfall is brought about by clever trickery on the part of Figaro and Suzanne.) Bégearss is almost certainly based on one of Beaumarchais's enemies, a lawyer called Nicolas Bergasse, with whom the author had been embroiled in an acrimonious legal case in the last days of the Ancien Régime.

Beaumarchais completed the play early in 1791. It was to have been staged by the Comédie-Française, but the author fell out with the management over authors' rights. Instead the piece was premiered at the new Théâtre du Marais on 26 June 1792, and ran for fifteen performances across six weeks. Soon after this, Beaumarchais went into voluntary exile for political reasons. In his absence his friends arranged for the text of the play to be published, in the hope of preventing unauthorised editions by opportunistic publishers. They made some changes to comply with the prevailing orthodoxy of the French Revolution: most particularly they suppressed the Almavivas' aristocratic titles "Count" and "Countess". By 1796 Beaumarchais had returned to Paris and the play was finally presented at the Comédie-Française in 1797 and again in 1799–1800. The work thereafter fell out of the general repertoire, but was revived successfully at the Comédie-Française in 1990.

== Characters ==
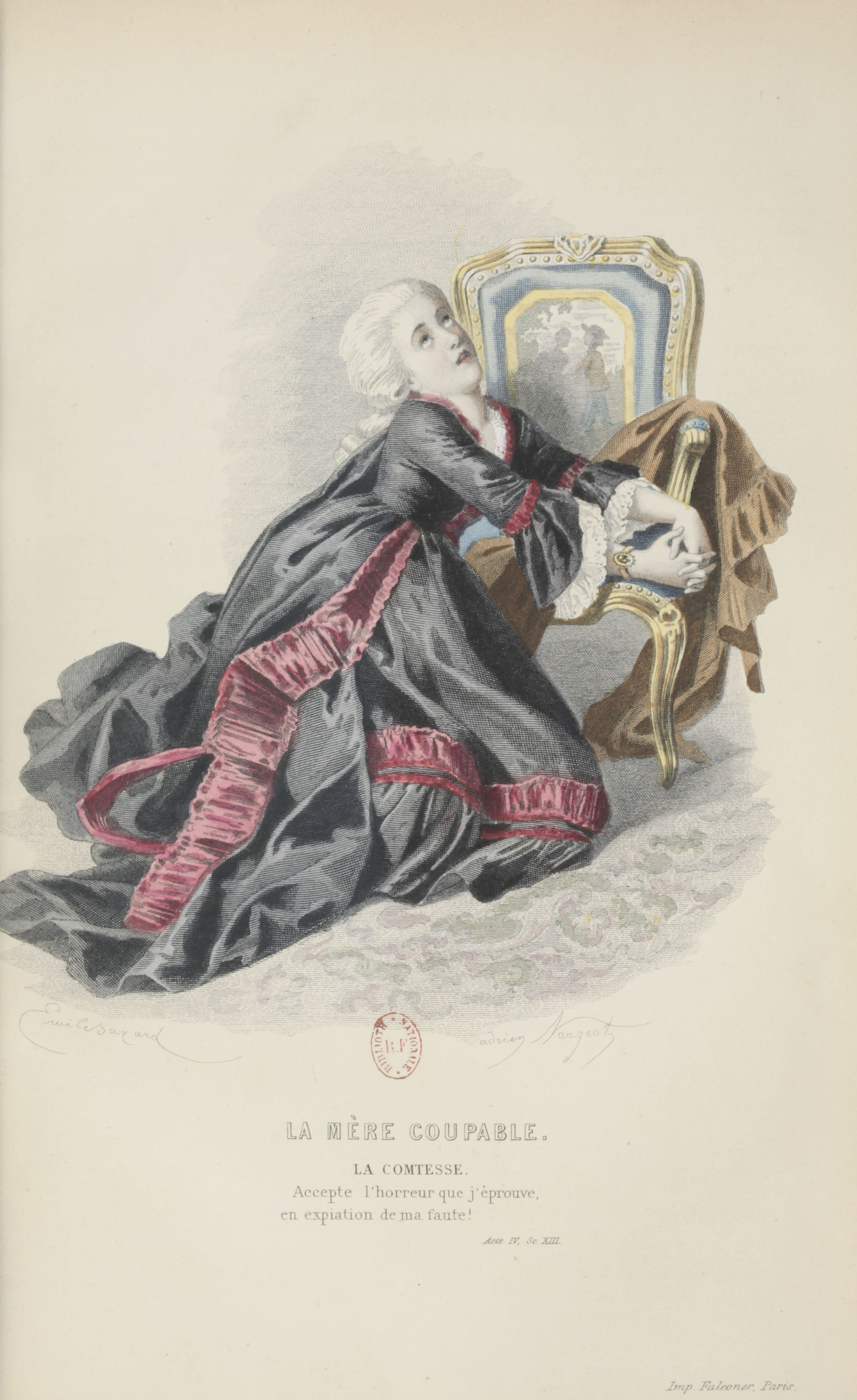
Illustration of Countess Almaviva by Émile Bayard (1876)

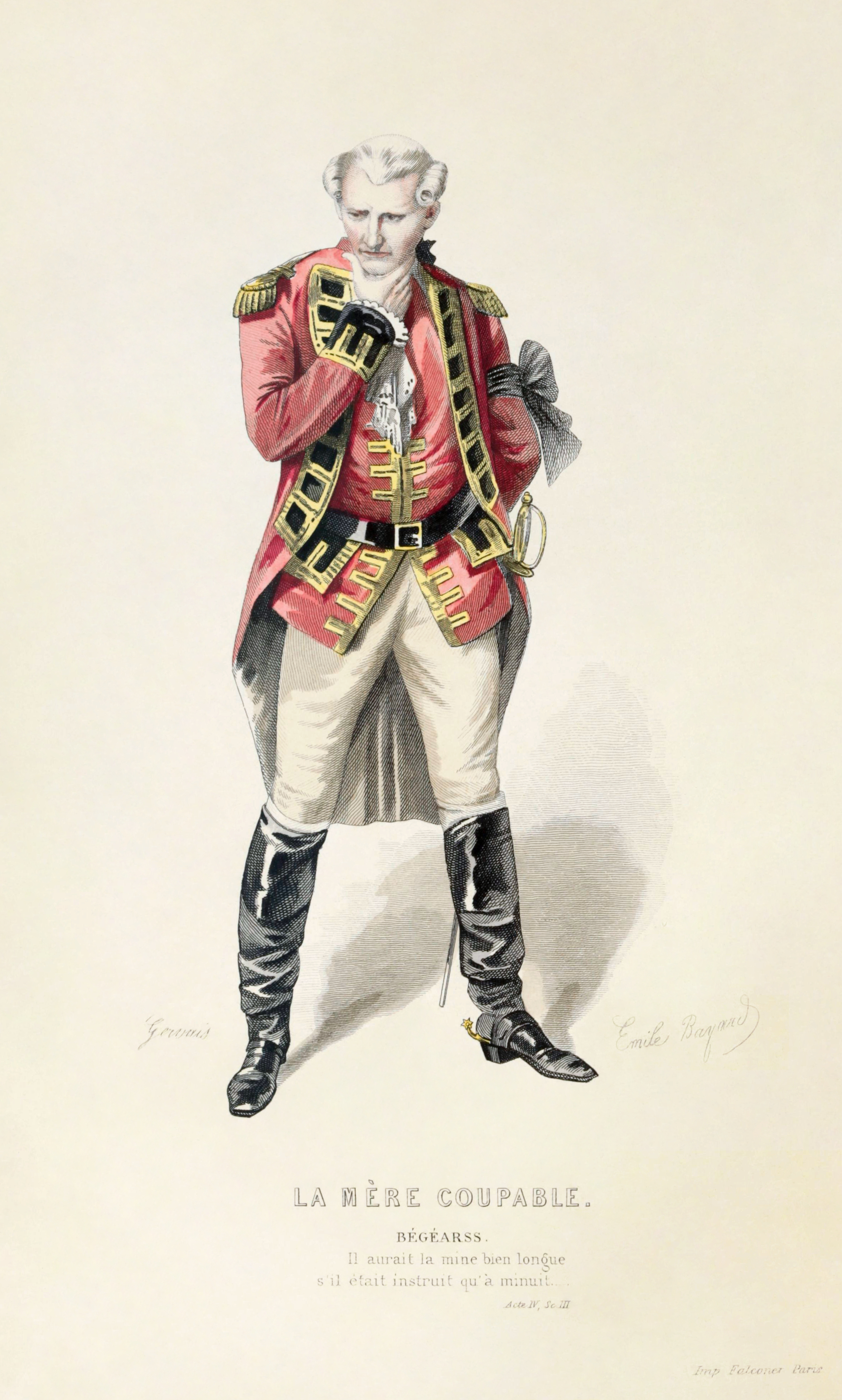
Illustration of Bégearss by Émile Bayard (1876)

The characters, as described by Beaumarchais's characterisations, are:

- Count Almaviva, a Spanish lord with noble pride but not vanity.
- Countess Almaviva, very melancholy, and with the piety of an angel.
- Chevalier Léon, their son (actually, the son of the Countess and Chérubin, who died in battle); young man obsessed with freedom, like all ardent new souls.
- Florestine, ward of Count Almaviva; a young person full of compassion.
- Bégearss, Irishman, a Major in the Spanish military, an old secretary to the Count when he was ambassador; a very deep man, and great schemer of intrigues, accomplished in the art of troublemaking.
- Figaro, servant and confidant of the Count; a man formed by worldly experience and events.
- Suzanne, maid and confidant of the Countess; wife of Figaro; excellent woman, devoted to her mistress and having left behind the illusions of youth.
- M. Fal, the Count's notary; a precise and honest man.
- Guillaume, German valet to M. Bégearss; a man too gentle for such a master.

== Plot ==
=== Synopsis ===
The action takes place twenty years after the previous play in the trilogy, The Marriage of Figaro. The story's premise is that several years ago, while the Count was away on a long business trip, the Countess and Chérubin spent a night together. When the Countess told Chérubin that what they did was wrong and that she could never see him again, he went away to war and intentionally let himself be mortally wounded on the field. As he lay dying, he wrote a final letter to the Countess, declaring his love and regrets, and making mention of all the things they had done. The Countess did not have the heart to throw away the letter, and instead had a special box supplied by an Irishman called Bégearss, with a secret compartment in which to store the incriminating note, so the Count would never find it. Soon after, to her dismay, the Countess discovered herself pregnant with Chérubin's child.

The Count has been suspicious all these years that he is not the father of Léon, the Countess's son, and so he has been rapidly trying to spend his fortune to ensure the boy will not inherit any of it, even having gone so far as to renounce his title and move the family to Paris; but he has nevertheless held some doubts, and therefore has never officially disowned the boy or even brought up his suspicions to the Countess.

Meanwhile, the Count has an illegitimate child of his own, a daughter named Florestine. Bégearss wants to marry her, and to ensure that she will be the Count's only heir, he begins to stir up trouble over the Countess's secret. Figaro and Suzanne, who are still married, must once again come to the rescue of the Count and Countess; and of their illegitimate children Léon and Florestine, who are secretly in love with each other.

=== Detailed plot ===
Act I

Figaro and his wife Suzanne are still in the service of Count Almaviva and his wife Rosine, but the household has all moved to France. The Count is there with the intention of dissipating his large fortune, not wishing to leave it to his heir, Léon. The piece begins on Saint Leo's day, the birthday of the son the Countess has had with the former page, Chérubin. Ever since the Count and Countess's only son died in a duel, the Count has been hostile to Léon, who he suspects is the fruit of the Countess's adultery. Monsieur Bégearss, an Irishman, is introduced to the household. Figaro and Suzanne suspect him of wanting to betray them. He wants to marry Florestine, the ward of the Count, and to move Léon—who also wants to marry Florestine—away to Malta, accompanied by Figaro. Bégearss calls the Count's attention to a letter that Chérubin wrote to the Countess, which confirms the Count's suspicions about his wife's infidelity and Léon's parentage.

Act II

Having read the letter the Count is infuriated, finding at last substantiation of his suspicions. He consents to Bégearss marrying Florestine. Bégearss tells the household that Florestine is in fact the Count's daughter, and that she therefore cannot marry León. She dissolves into tears and León is grief-stricken.

Act III

The Countess is persuaded that it will be in Florestine's best interests to marry Bégearss; the Count is prepared to give a substantial part of his fortune to Begearss as part of the marriage settlement. At the insistence of Bégearss, the Countess tearfully burns the letters she has kept from Chérubin. The marriage ceremony is to take place that evening.

Act IV

The Countess promises Léon she will appeal to the Count. She makes an eloquent plea, but the Count rebukes her over her adultery. The Countess faints, and the Count hastens to summon help. Suzanne and Figaro uncover Bégearss's plot, and are determined that he must be prevented from marrying Florestine and getting hold of the Count's fortune.

Act V

Figaro and Suzanne convince the Count and Countess that Bégearss is a bad man who is plotting against them. The disclosure of Bégearss's treachery brings the Count and Countess together. Almaviva, overwhelmed by relief at seeing Florestine saved from marrying Bégearss, is ready to forgo his fortune; Figaro, on the other hand, has no intention of letting the villain get away with the Count's money.

The Countess adopts Florestine as her daughter and tells her not to marry Bégearss; the Count adopts Léon as his son. Bégearss returns from a notary, now in a strong legal position over the Count's money. By complicated trickery led by Figaro, Bégearss is finally outwitted and sent away empty-handed and furious. As it is now established that Léon is the Countess's son but not the Count's, and Florestine is the Count's daughter but not the Countess's, there is demonstrably no consanguinity, and they are free to marry one another.

== Operas ==
As with the other Figaro plays, there are operatic versions; as with the play itself, they are not nearly as well known as those made from the two earlier plays; and unlike the operas based on the earlier plays, adaptations of The Guilty Mother are rarely performed in the modern repertoire. The first proposal to turn The Guilty Mother into an opera was by André Grétry, but the project came to nothing. Darius Milhaud's La mère coupable (1966) was the first to be completed, and Inger Wikström made an adaptation called Den Brottsliga Modern (1990). In John Corigliano's The Ghosts of Versailles, there is a subplot in which the ghost of Beaumarchais, as an entertainment for the ghost of Marie Antoinette (with whom he is in love), conjures up a performance of the play as an opera: A Figaro for Antonia, claiming that by doing so he will change history and that Marie Antoinette will not be executed. In April 2010, the opera L'amour coupable by Thierry Pécou to a libretto by Eugène Green based on the Beaumarchais play received its world premiere at L'Opéra de Rouen. Most recently, the play has been adapted by Icelandic singer, composer and librettist dr. Þórunn Guðmundsdóttir into the opera Hliðarspor, which is entirely in Icelandic. The title is a double entendre for stepping to the side and having an extramarital affair. All three operas were staged, the earlier two pieces in new Icelandic translations, in succession in December 2024 - March 2025 with numerous singers taking part in more than one of them.

== Notes and references ==
Notes

== Sources ==
- Beaumarchais, Pierre Augustin Caron de (1794). L'autre Tartuffe, ou La Mère coupable, drame moral en cinq actes (in French). Paris: Maradan. OCLC 23643607.
- Howarth, William D (2012). Beaumarchais and the Theatre. London: Routledge. ISBN 978-1134985913.
