= La Mère coupable =

Opera by Darius Milhaud

- Opera by Darius Milhaud
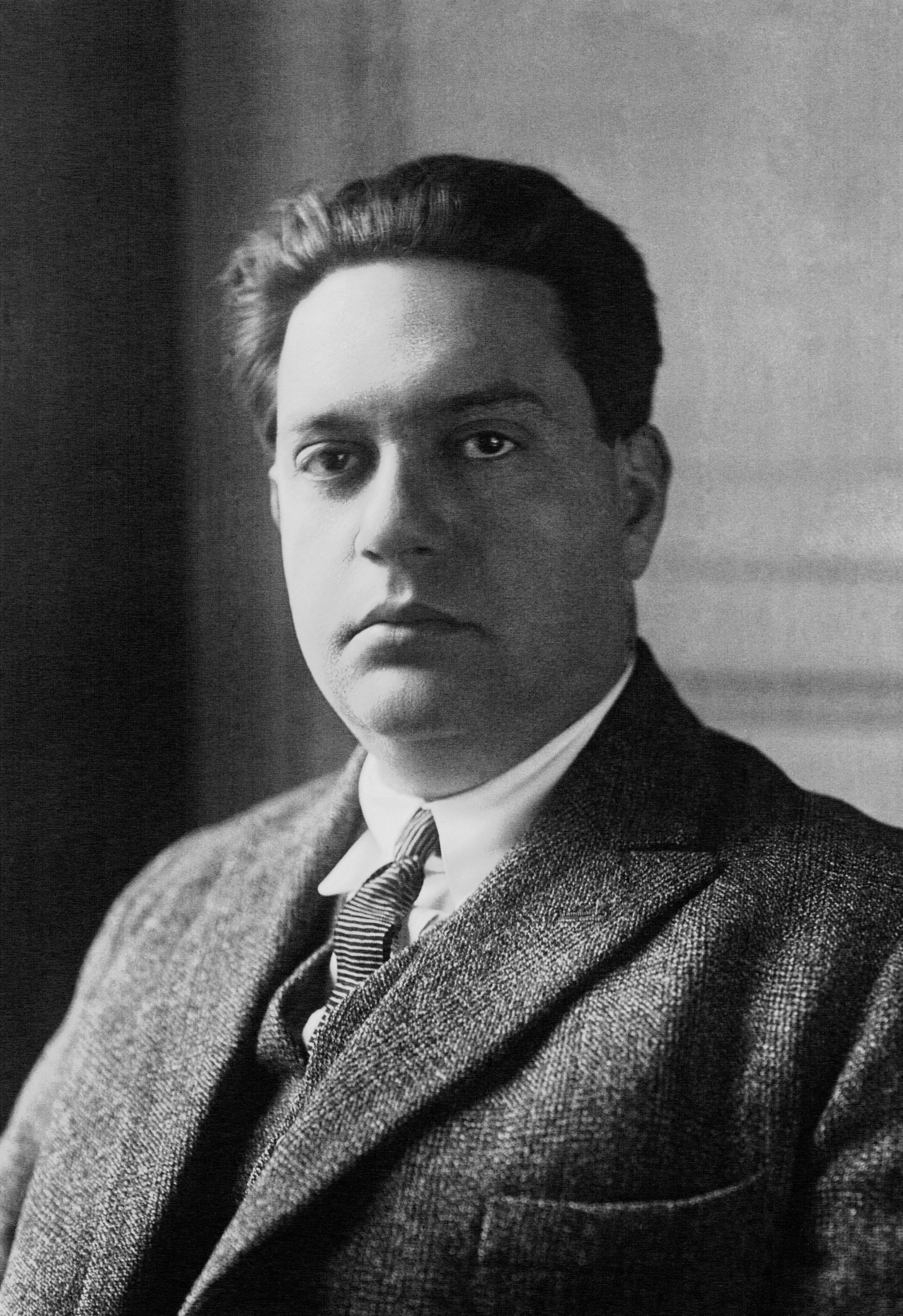
- Milhaud in 1923
- Librettist: Madeleine Milhaud
- Language: French
- Based on: The Guilty Mother
- Premiere: 13 June 1966; Grand Théâtre de Genève

La Mère coupable (The Guilty Mother) is an opera in three acts, Op. 412, by Darius Milhaud to a libretto by Madeleine Milhaud after the 1792 play, the third in Beaumarchais' Figaro trilogy. It premiered at the Grand Théâtre de Genève on 13 June 1966.

== Roles ==
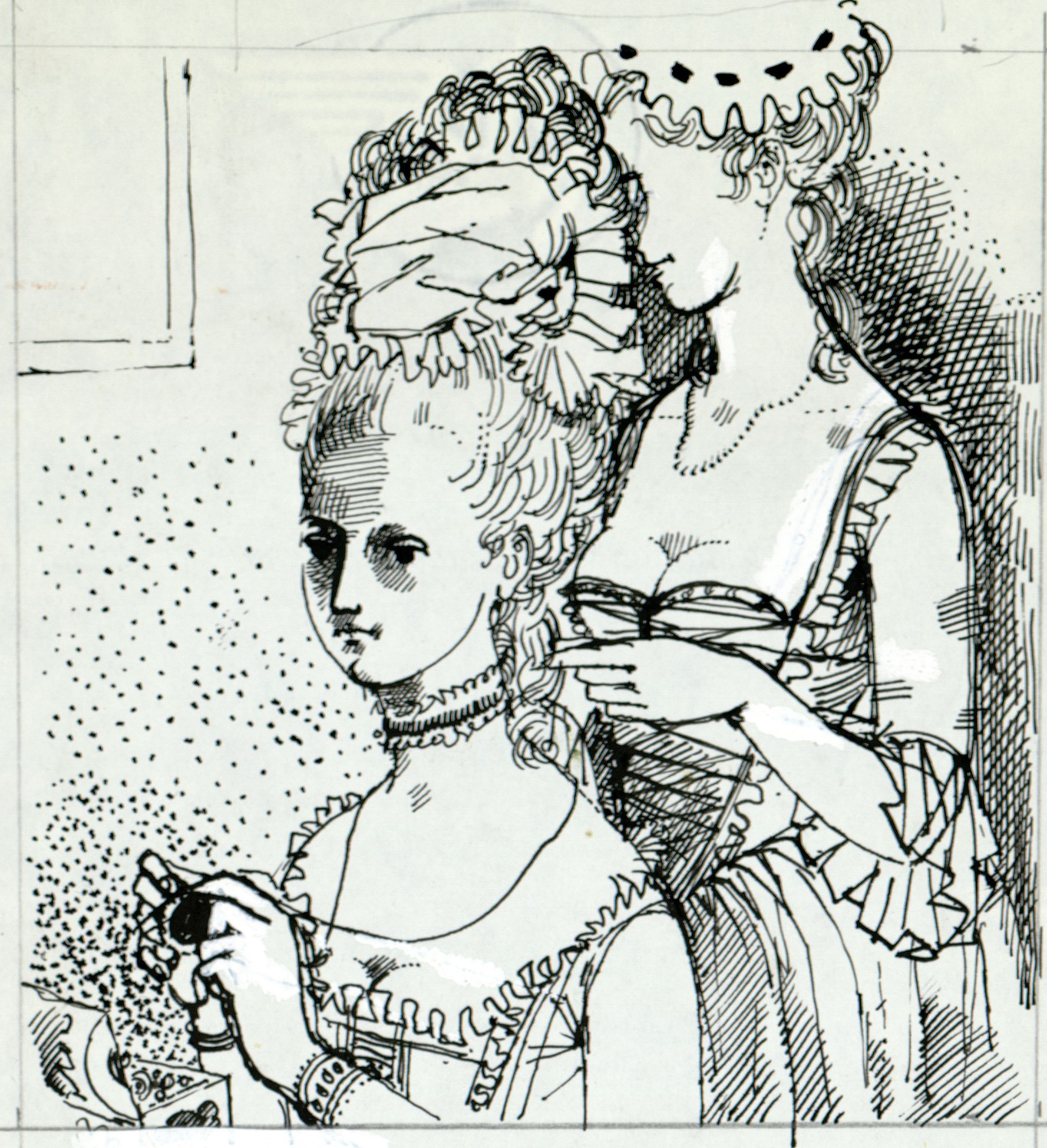
Drawing for La Mère coupable (undated).

Role	Voice type	Premiere Cast, 13 June 1966 (Conductor: Serge Baudo)
Count Almaviva	baritone	Louis Quilico
Rosine, the Countess	soprano	Phyllis Curtin
Chevalier Léon, her son	tenor	Eric Tappy
Florestine, ward of Count Almaviva	coloratura soprano	Anne-Marie Sanial
Bégearss, an Irish schemer	baritone	Jacques Doucet
Figaro, Almaviva's valet	baritone	Jean-Christophe Benoît
Suzanne, his wife	mezzo-soprano	Cora Canne-Meyer
Master Fal	bass	José van Dam
