= Clavigo (play) =

Clavigo is a five-act tragedy written by Johann Wolfgang von Goethe in 1774. The lead role is taken by Pierre Beaumarchais. The play was written in just eight days in May 1774. It was published by July 1774 and is the first printed work to which Goethe put his own name, although the play was received with disfavour.

The first performance of the play was by the Ackermannschen Gesellschaft in Hamburg on 23 August 1774.

It is based on the offer of marriage that the Canarian writer José Clavijo y Fajardo made to the sister of Beaumarchais.

During the 1970s, Clavigo was adapted as a TV movie.
