= Figaro Coffee =

Philippine coffee company and coffeehouse chain

- Formerly: "F" store (1993)
- Type: Subsidiary
- Traded as: PSE: FCG
- Industry: Coffee shop
- Founded: November 1993; 32 years ago Makati, Philippines
- Headquarters: Mandaluyong, Philippines
- Number of locations: 63 (2019)
- Products: Coffee beverages; Fine meals; Pastries; Dessert
- Parent: The Figaro Coffee Group Inc.
- Website: figarocoffee.com

Figaro Coffee Systems Inc. (Figaro Coffee) is a Philippine coffee company and coffeehouse chain that works on the franchise model. As of September 2013, it had 63 outlets in Philippines, Qatar, Saudi Arabia and Papua New Guinea. As of 2020, Figaro Coffee had a total of 90 outlets worldwide.

== History ==
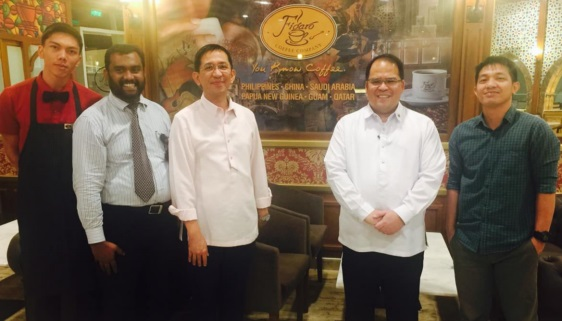
Philippine Ambassador to Qatar Wilfredo C. Santos (2nd from right) and Cultural Attaché John Danilo G. Jiao (3rd from left), together with the Filipino and expatriate staff members of Figaro in Qatar during the 2016 opening of a Figaro Coffee Shop in Doha.

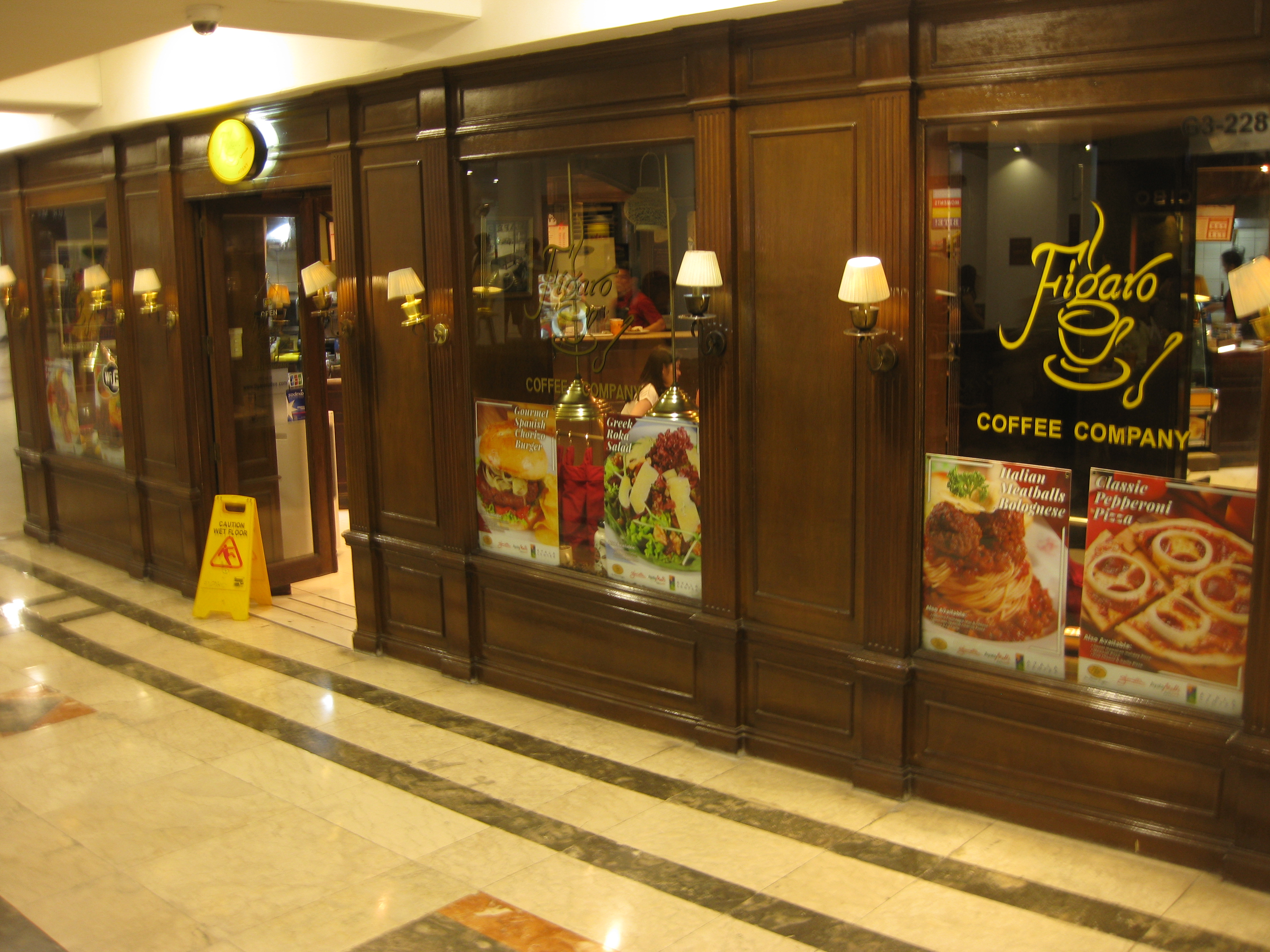
First Figaro Coffee Shop in todays Glorietta in Makati 2017

Figaro Coffee was established in November 1993 by seven college friends, including Pacita "Chit" Juan and Reena Francisco, as a small kiosk in Quad mall (now Glorietta) in Makati. Juan and Francisco were classmates at the University of the Philippines Diliman, where Juan had studied Hotel and Restaurant Administration. Juan, then involved in her family business, decided to start a coffee shop, something that she had earlier set out with while still in college.

The first outlet was called "the F store" and employed one managing partner and two employees. The shop had coffee and tea paraphernalia including fresh ground coffee beans. After a few trying initial months, the owners decided to give the coffee shop a name. In April 1994, the founders chose the name "Figaro", inspired by the opera Barber of Seville. Juan and her friends wanted to set up a place where "Filipinos can get the perfect coffee and all the necessary accoutrements for coffee making”.

Juan subsequently became the CEO of Figaro Coffee, a position she retained until 2008. Jose Fernando Alcantara became CEO in 2008, followed by CrisMel Verano in 2009. Francisco was the COO until 2008.

In 1998, Juan met Rev. Fr. Roger Bagao, a coffee farmer and Catholic priest from Tagaytay City who headed a farmers' coffee cooperative. In 1999, Figaro Coffee introduced Cafe Barako, as part of the "Save the Barako" campaign. Around the same time, the Figaro Foundation was set up, to help coffee farmers grow coffee profitably.

In 2002, while at Figaro Coffee, Juan became the President of the National Coffee Development Board (now Philippine Coffee Board Inc). After Figaro Coffee, she went on to set up ECHOstore.

In 2005, Figaro Coffee opened its first overseas outlet in Shanghai. By mid-2006, Figaro had grown to 53 outlets, most of which were in Metro Manila, with two in Baguio and one in Davao. In 2006 (and again in 2009), Figaro Coffee voiced plans on an IPO in Makati Stock Exchange; however, those did not materialize. In December 2006, Figaro Coffee opened its first branch in Cebu city, and opened another 12 stores in 2007.

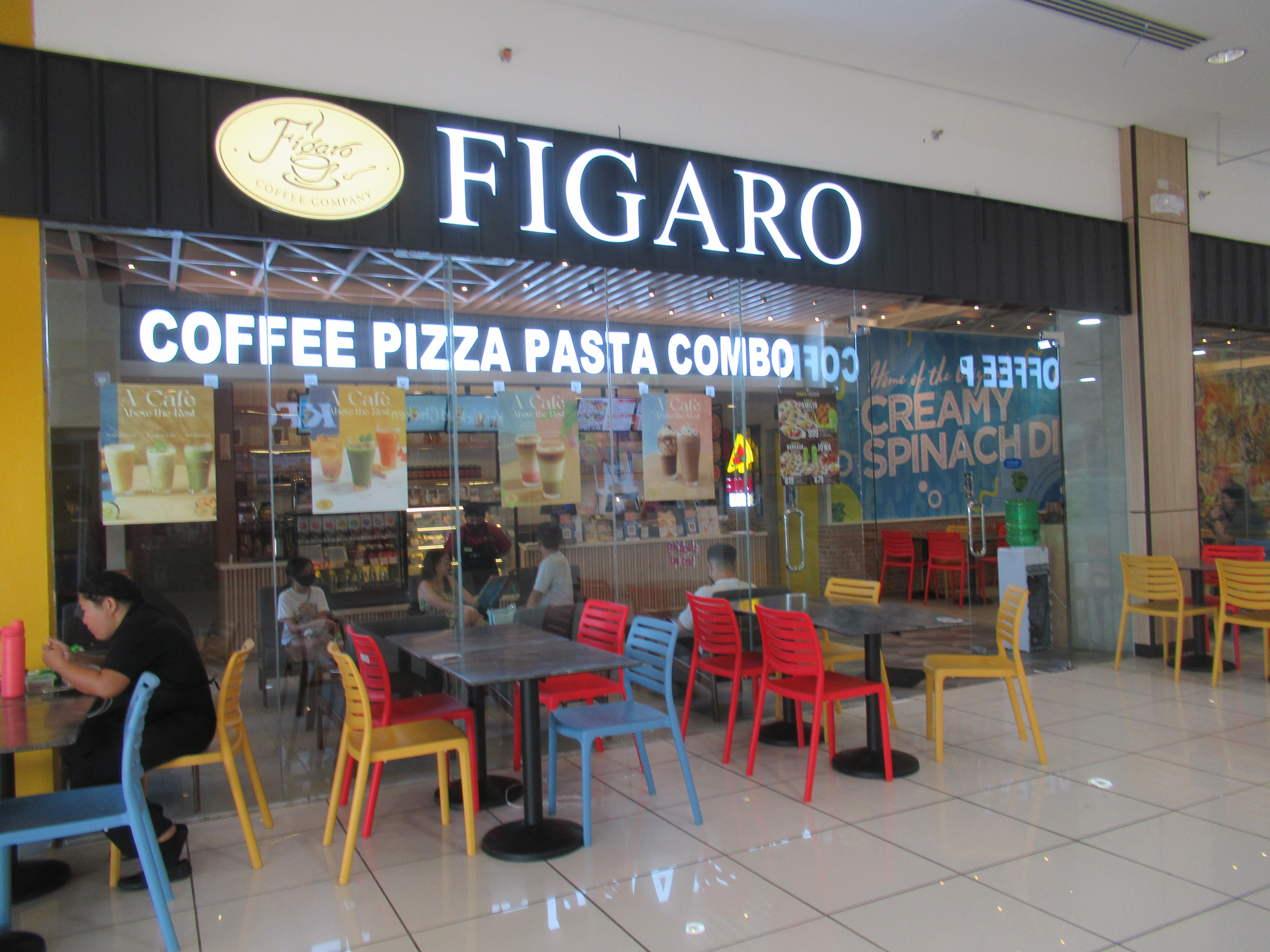
Figaro Coffee branch at Walter Mart Baliwag, Baliwag, Bulacan, Philippines

The year 2008 marked a turning point for Figaro Coffee as Juan and Francisco sold their shares in F Coffee Holdings Corporation (then-parent company of Figaro Coffee) to the Tanseco family. Juan and Francisco also relinquished management control of the Figaro Coffee. It is also reported that businessman Jerry Liu bought into Figaro Coffee in the same year. In 2009, the company underwent financial restructuring and closed some of its overseas branches. At this time, some trademarks of Figaro Coffee continued to be owned by Juan and were contested in court. In the same year, Figaro Coffee began to experiment in retailing and exporting organic coffee. As of February 28, 2012, the trademark dispute has been settled between the parties in favor of Figaro Coffee.

In April 2013, the franchisee manager of Figaro Coffee, Mike Barret, announced their intent to open outlets in Fiji and Vietnam.

On June 21, 2021, ownership of Figaro Coffee Systems, Inc. was transferred from F Coffee Holdings Corporation to The Figaro Coffee Group Inc. (PSE: FGC). FGC also owns and operates other concepts such as Angel's Pizza and Tien Ma's, a Taiwanese cuisine restaurant.

== See also ==
- List of coffeehouse chains
