= José Clavijo y Fajardo =

Spanish journalist (1726–1806)

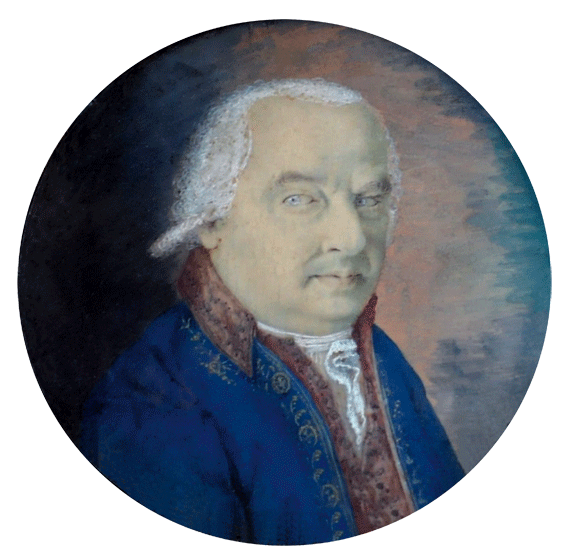
José Clavijo y Fajardo

José Clavijo y Fajardo (19 March 1726 in Teguise, Lanzarote – 3 November 1806) was a Spanish journalist.

== Life ==
He was born on Lanzarote (Canary Islands). He settled in Madrid, became editor of El Pensador, and by his campaign against the public performance of autos sacramentales, secured their prohibition in 1765. In 1770 he was appointed director of the royal theatres, a post which he resigned in order to take up the editorship of the Mercurio Histórico y Político de Madrid. At the time of his death in 1806 he was secretary to the Cabinet of Natural History.

He had in abundance the courage, perseverance and gift of pungent expression which form the equipment of the aggressive journalist, but his work would long since have been forgotten were it not that it put an end to a peculiarly national form of dramatic exposition, and that his love affair with one of Pierre Beaumarchais' sisters suggested the theme of Goethe's first publication, Clavigo.
