= Madeleine Milhaud =

French actress and librettist

- Born: 22 March 1902; Paris, France
- Died: 17 January 2008 (aged 105); Paris, France
- Occupations: Stage actress Librettist
- Spouse: Darius Milhaud (m. 1925; died 1974)
- Children: 1

Madeleine Milhaud Milhaud (22 March 1902 – 17 January 2008) was a French actress and librettist. She was both cousin to and wife of composer Darius Milhaud.

== Biography ==
Madeleine Milhaud was born in Paris to Michel and Maria Milhaud. Her father was from Aix-en-Provence, and her mother from Brussels. She began acting at a young age, and had a long career as an actress and reciter.

Madeleine married her cousin, Darius Milhaud, in 1925. The couple had one son, Daniel (1930–2014), a painter. Darius' piano suite La Muse Menagère (The Household Muse) is dedicated to her, and depicts their daily life together. She wrote the libretti for his operas Médée, Bolivar, and La Mère coupable.

The family fled France when the Germans were within range of Paris in May 1940. They reached Lisbon and from there sailed to America, where they and their 10-year-old son stayed for the remainder of the war. Darius taught at Mills College (in California) and Madeleine taught American students about French and French theatre. They returned to France in 1946.
