= Irische Legende =

Opera by Werner Egk

- Opera by Werner Egk
- Librettist: Egk
- Language: German
- Based on: The Countess Cathleen by W. B. Yeats
- Premiere: 17 August 1955; Salzburg Festival

Irische Legende (Irish Legend) is a 1955 opera by Werner Egk who also wrote the libretto after the 1892/1899 verse drama The Countess Cathleen by W. B. Yeats. It premiered at the Salzburg Festival on 17 August 1955.

== History ==
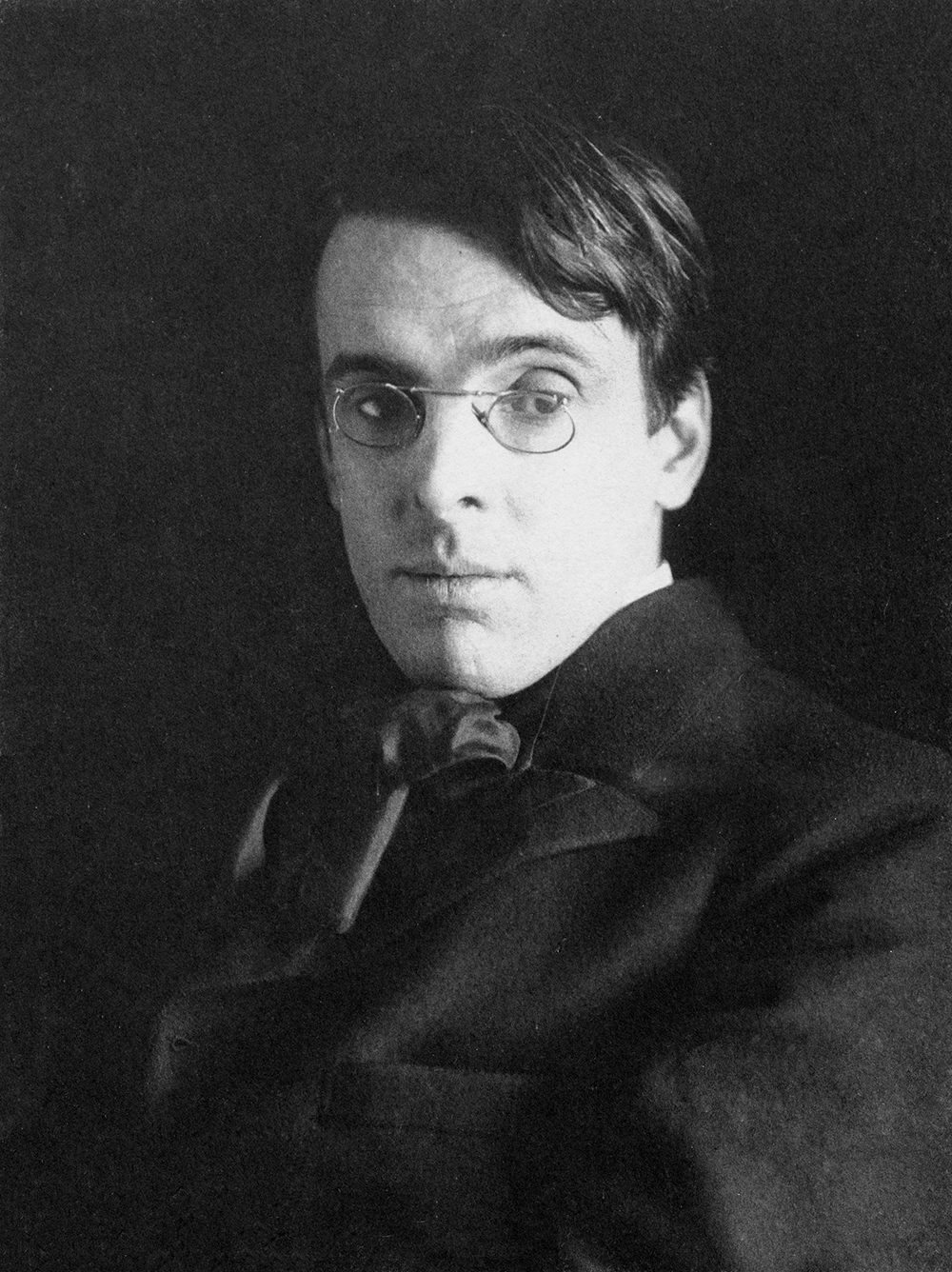
W. B. Yeats, on whose story the opera is based, in 1903

Irische Legende was the first opera that Egk composed after World War II. He had studied with Carl Orff in Munich, and was successful in the 1930s with Die Zaubergeige, Peer Gynt and Columbus: Bericht und Bildnis. He was invited to compose an opera for the 1955 Salzburg Festival. The project was supported by Wilhelm Furtwängler. Egk wrote his own libretto based on The Countess Cathleen by Yeats which has elements of Irish mysticism from both heathen and Christian roots.

Irische Legende was premiered at the Salzburg Festival on 17 August 1955, conducted by George Szell and directed by Oscar Fritz Schuh, with Inge Borkh and the young Walter Berry in leading roles. The premiere performance was broadcast by international radio stations. The premiere received international recognition. The Salzburg Festival presented nine premieres between 1947 and 1957, including von Einem's Dantons Tod, Orff's Antigone, Blacher's Romeo und Julia and Die Liebe der Danae by Richard Strauss. Egk revised the opera in 1975.

== Plot ==
Ireland suffers a famine. Two messengers of the devil, disguised as merchants, promise food to the hungry in return for selling their souls. Many despaired give in and end in hell. The countess Cathleen offers her soul to save the others. Egk explained that he liked the concept that one person could try, against all odds, to stand up for others in a seemingly hopeless situation ("dass ein Einzelner in scheinbar hoffnungsloser Lage – der eigenen Verantwortung bewusst und gegen alle Wahrscheinlichkeit – einen Ausbruch aus der Hoffnungslosigkeit unternimmt").

== Roles ==
Role	Voice type	Premiere cast, 17 August 1955 Conductor: George Szell
Cathleen	soprano	Inge Borkh
Der Dichter Aleel (Aleel, the poet)	baritone	Kurt Böhme
Die Amme Oona (Oona, the nurse)	contralto	Margarete Klose
Der Verwalter (The Administrator)	baritone	Franz Bierbach
Zwei Hirten (two Shepherds)	tenor, bass	Waldemar Kmentt, Theo Baylé
Der Tiger (The Tiger)	baritone	Walter Berry
Zwei Eulen (two Owls)	soprano, contralto	Chloe Owen, Lilian Benningsen
Der Geier (The Vulture)	tenor	Laszlo Szemere
Die Schlange	dancer	Maria Litto
Zwei Hyänen in Gestalt von Kaufleuten (Two Hyenas in the appearance of merchants)	tenor, baritone	Max Lorenz, Oskar Czerwenka
Fausts Erscheinung (Apparition of Faust)	bass	Gottlob Frick
Stimme hinter der Szene (Satanas) (Voice behind the scene, Satan)	bass	Gottlob Frick
Seele (Soul)		Patricia Brinton
Die leeren Seelen, Engel, Hirten, Knechte, Volk (The empty souls, angels, shepherds, servants, crowd

The story takes place in Ireland in legendary time.

== Recording ==
- Irische Legende Inge Borkh, Kurt Böhme, Walter Berry, Max Lorenz, Gottlob Frick, Waldemar Kmentt, chorus of the Wiener Staatsoper, Wiener Philharmoniker, George Szell
