= Hans Schimmerling =

Hans Schimmerling (born Hanus Aldo Schimmerling; 5 September 1900 – 19 October 1967) was a Czech-American pianist, composer, teacher, musicologist and writer.

== Life and education ==
Schimmerling was born on 5 September 1900 in Brno, Moravia, Austria-Hungary (now the Czech Republic). He was born to Hugo Schimmerling, a dentist, and Eugenie (Jennie) Grossman. Both parents fell victims to the Holocaust in 1944. Hans Schimmerling grew up speaking both Slovak and German, later learning Italian and English. He started to study the piano at age six, adding the cello at age eleven and music theory at fourteen. He gave his first public recital at thirteen and was teaching at seventeen. He received degrees in both law and music from the University of Vienna and the Conservatory of Vienna respectively, and later graduated from the Composers and Conductors Department of the Academy of Music in Prague.

== Personal life and death ==
Schimmerling married his wife, Mathylda, in 1932 and lived in Vienna from 1928 to 1938. He went into the hospital in New York City in 1967 for a minor operation and unexpectedly died on 19 October 1967, at the age of 67.

== Work ==
Immediately after graduation, Schimmerling became the coach and conductor at the German Opera in Prague for a year and a half. He was then invited to go to the United States as the accompanist for a Berlin opera star, and spent a year and a half at the Metropolitan Opera in New York City. After touring the East, South and Midwest of the United States, Schimmerling went to Paris, where he enrolled in a summer course at the Sorbonne. He returned to the United States in 1926 as accompanist for Michael Bohnen, then the leading Metropolitan Opera bass. In 1937, he wrote a newspaper serial called, "Lerne Deutsch in 120 Jahren!" (Learn German in 120 years!) with cartoons drawn by Beate Wiesner. Hans left Vienna for Brno just before Hitler's invasion of Vienna. He took a course at a teacher's college and taught music, German and European history at the Massaryk High School. In 1939, he and his wife went to Prague; then to Trieste, Italy, and sailed to the U.S aboard the Vulcania, landing in New York City. Schimmerling became an American citizen in 1944. He stayed in New York City for about eleven years, composing, conducting, teaching and writing articles for magazines. He was connected with the Cathedral of St. John the Divine, the Opera Workshop at Hunter College, the Czechoslovak Choral Society and, in the 1950s, was the director of the Opera and Music Theory Department of the Chatham Square Music School.

Schimmerling wrote eighty-five publications on the subject of music. In the field of research on Slavonic music, his book Folk Dance Music of the Slavic Nations earned him two honorary degrees. The two major pieces among his choral works are "Memories of Czechoslovakia," written in 1945, and his satire for a male chorus, "Elegy," which has had more than 1000 radio and other performances. His sacred music, especially the cycle of ten anthems, A Millennium of Earliest Known Christian Hymn Writing, is sung by choral groups throughout the United States. Schimmerling wrote an autobiography which remains unpublished.

In the 1950s, Schimmerling bought a home in Woodstock, New York and spent most of his time there. He was employed by the Board of Cooperative Services (BOCES) in Ulster County, New York. He taught music in Woodstock, Kingston and Tillson, New York, and also gave private piano lessons. He taught until 1960, when he officially retired. During his elementary school teaching, he introduced new features in classroom teaching as well as school performances. His school programs, such as Musical Journey to Europe, From Sophocles to Rodgers & Hammerstein, and especially The American Parade (a combination of studies in music, American history and geography) were widely acclaimed. The American Parade is a two-part pageant for children. Part I is "History on Parade, from Sir Walter Raleigh to Thomas Edison," and Part II is "A Parade of the Fifty States from Virginia to Hawaii." After his retirement, Schimmerling made frequent trips to Europe, visiting schools in Austria, Switzerland, Germany, Italy, and the Scandinavian countries, comparing different methods of teaching.

Schimmerling wrote over 1,200 articles for local and other papers and magazines. Many of Schimmerling's compositions have been performed throughout the U.S. and Europe. A few of them are "Te Deum", "First Symphony", "Cantus Contra Bella", and a cantata for a baritone solo and chorus, "Humphrey Potter", composed in 1943. In 1996. a choral concert program by the Texas Tech ninety-voice chorus included a Schimmerling capella, "Kde Su Kravy Moje".

== Compositions ==
- Song cycle Pierrot marie (1920)
- Oriental symphony for orchestra, organ, choir and solo Der Fluch der Kröte (1921)
- Six miniatures, for chamber orchestra (1922)
- Lyrische Kammermusik, for strings, piano, clarinet and voice (1923)
- Symphonic poem for baritone and orchestra Die Kirschblüte op.11 (1924)
- Burleske, for orchestra (1925)
- Piano trio op.12
- Lustige Ouvertüre, for orchestra op.16
- Sinfonietta parisienne, for orchestra and voice op.18 (1926)
- 40 songs for voice and piano or orchestra
- Song cycle Der Gesang vom rollenden Globus, for men's choir and piano (1937)
- Tumult in Tamberg, musical grotesque (1938)
- Viola sonata in C major (1939)
- String trio in G major (1939)
- Cantata for baritone, choir and orchestra Ballade von der goldenen Schwelle
- Cantata for baritone, choir and piano Humphrey Potter
- Frankie and Johnny, musical play op.39 (1941)
- Te Deum, for soli, chorus and orchestra (1944)
- Opera Silvio Pellico
- Symphony No.1 (1949)
- Toccata und Fuga chromatica, for organ (1949)
- Slavonian Rhapsody Concerto (1949)
- Requiem for solo, choir and orchestra (1950)
- Serenade for string quartet, piano and 3 female voices (1952)
