= Clara Ebers =

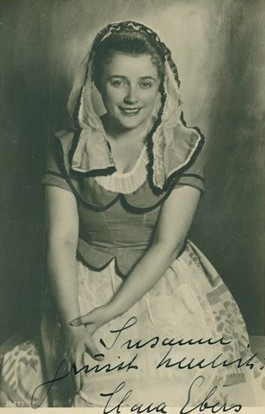
- As Susanna in The Marriage of Figaro
- Born: December 26, 1902; Karlsruhe, German Empire
- Died: February 7, 1997 (aged 94); Hamburg, Germany
- Occupations: Soprano, voice teacher

Clara Ebers (December 26, 1902 – February 7, 1997) was a German soprano and voice teacher. She worked as an opera and concert soprano from 1924 until her retirement in 1965. She was a resident soprano at Theater Mönchengladbach (1925-1926), Opernhaus Düsseldorf (1926-1928), Oper Frankfurt (1928-1945), Kiel Opera (1945-1947), and the Hamburg State Opera (1947-1965). She also sang as a guest artist with opera houses throughout Europe. In her later life she worked as a teacher of singing in Hamburg both out of a private studio and on the faculty of the Staatliche Hochschule für Musik Hamburg.

== Early life and career ==
Clara Ebers was born in Karlsruhe on December 26, 1902. She studied singing in her native city with the Austrian baritone Eduard Erhard. She began her career as an apprentice artist at the Landestheater Karlsruhe in 1924 where she refined her operatic training as a coloratura soprano for one year. In 1925-1926 she was a resident artist at Theater Mönchengladbach. Here her early assignments included Donna Elvira in Mozart's Don Giovanni, Mimí in Puccini's La bohème, and Olympia in Offenbach's The Tales of Hoffmann. From 1926 to 1928 she was committed to the Opernhaus Düsseldorf.

== Oper Frankfurt and mid career performances ==
After this she had a long career as a prima donna at Oper Frankfurt where she was a resident artist from 1928 to 1945. Here she was the successor of Adele Kern; taking on many of the parts previously played by that soprano such as Despina in Così fan tutte, Gilda in Rigoletto, Susanna in The Marriage of Figaro, Zerbinetta in Ariadne auf Naxos, and the title role in Daphne. On January 13, 1942 Ebers portrayed Queen Isabella in the world premiere of the first stage version of Werner Egk's Columbus: Bericht und Bildnis at the Städtische Bühnen Frankfurt with Franz Konwitschny conducting. She also performed in the world premiere of Hermann Reutter's Odysseus in Frankfurt in 1942.

Some of the other roles Ebers sang while with Oper Frankfurt included Donna Anna in Don Giovanni, Elisabetta in Don Carlos, The Fiakermilli in Arabella, Ighino in Palestrina, Konstanze Die Entführung aus dem Serail, Lisa in The Land of Smiles, the Queen of the Night in The Magic Flute, Rosina in The Barber of Seville, Violetta in La traviata, and the title role in Madama Butterfly. She also appeared as a guest artist with the Dutch National Opera as Sophie in Der Rosenkavalier in 1934 and as Helmwige in Die Walküre at the Maggio Musicale Fiorentino in 1938. She made her only foray into Wagnerian repertoire for performances as Eva in Die Meistersinger von Nürnberg given in Detmold in 1939 and 1944. Other guest appearances included performances at the Zurich Opera (1934), the Staatsoper Dresden (1935), and the Vlaamse Opera (1937 & 1938).

== Later performance career ==
Ebers was a member of the Kiel Opera from 1945 to 1947. She was a resident soprano at the Hamburg State Opera (HSO) from 1947 until her retirement from the stage in 1965. Her repertoire at the HSO included Agathe in Der Freischütz, the Countess in Capriccio, Desdemona in Otello, The Empress in Die Frau ohne Schatten, Euridice in Orfeo ed Euridice, Leonora in both Il trovatore and La forza del destino, Maddalena in Andrea Chénier, The Marschallin in Der Rosenkavalier, Pamina in The Magic Flute, and all four of the lead soprano roles in The Tales of Hoffmann. She created the part of the Countess in the world premiere of Klebe’s Figaro läßt sich scheiden at the HSO in 1963.

In 1950 Ebers portrayed Violetta in La traviata at the Royal Opera House in London, and appeared as Countess Almaviva in The Marriage of Figaro at Glyndebourne Festival Opera. She also sang the latter role at the Edinburgh Festival, and made guest appearances at the Aix-en-Provence Festival (1949), the Bavarian State Opera, La Monnaie, La Scala, Opéra de Nice, and the Teatro Nacional de São Carlos among several other European opera houses. She performed regularly with the Berlin State Opera from 1955 to 1961; aiding in the rebuilding of the company after the destruction of the opera house during World War II. In 1963 she portrayed The Marschallin at the Vienna State Opera.

== Later life and death ==
After retiring from the stage Ebers had a second career as a voice teacher. From 1964 to 1971 she was a professor of singing at the Staatliche Hochschule für Musik Hamburg. She contined to teach privately in Hamburg in the later years of her life.

Ebers died in Hamburg on February 7, 1997.
