= Lilian Benningsen =

Austrian opera singer

- Born: 17 July 1924; Vienna
- Died: 12 June 2014 (aged 89); Munich, Bavaria, Germany
- Occupations: Operatic mezzo-soprano; Contralto; Voice teacher
- Organizations: Bavarian State Opera
- Title: Kammersängerin
- Awards: Bavarian Order of Merit

Lilian Benningsen (17 July 1924 – 12 June 2014) was an Austrian operatic mezzo-soprano and contralto. She made an international career based at the Bavarian State Opera for decades, where she first appeared as Eboli in Verdi's Don Carlos. She created several roles, such as Carolina in Henze's Elegie für junge Liebende at the 1961 Schwetzingen Festival. Her recordings include both operas and concerts.

== Life and career ==
Born in Vienna, Benningsen was trained as a singer in Vienna by Elisabeth Radó and Anna Bahr-Mildenburg. She had her first great success in 1947 when the 23-year-old won first prize in the singing competition of the Gesellschaft der Musikfreunde in Vienna. About a year later, Benningsen made her debut at the Salzburger Landestheater, as Bostana in Der Barbier von Bagdad by Peter Cornelius. She moved on to the Deutsches Theater Göttingen and the Cologne Opera, where she sang from 1950 to 1952.

Her breakthrough came in 1951 when she appeared as a guest at the Bavarian State Opera in Munich as Eboli in Verdi's Don Carlos. She was engaged at the State Opera and remained a member of the ensemble for almost three decades. She sang alongside Erika Köth, Leonie Rysanek, Marianne Schech, Josef Metternich, Kurt Böhme and Hans Hopf, among others. She appeared as Marzelline in Mozart's Le nozze di Figaro on 14 June 1958 for the reopening of the Cuvilliés-Theater. Among her roles were Marcellina in Rossini's Der Barbier von Sevilla, Dorabella in Mozart's Così fan tutte, and Fricka in Wagner's Der Ring des Nibelungen. Among her signature roles was the title role of Bizet's Carmen. In 1959, she appeared as Achille in Handel's Deidamia, sung in German and conducted by Meinhard von Zallinger.

Benningsen made guest appearances at great European opera houses and festivals, including the Salzburg Festival, Lisbon and Athens. At the Vienna State Opera, she appeared as Amneris in Verdi's Aida, the title role in Der Rosenkavalier by Richard Strauss, and as the Buriya in Janáček's Jenůfa. She took part in the UK premiere of Die Liebe der Danae by Richard Strauss at the Royal Opera House in London in 1953. She created the role of the Zweite Eule in Werner Egk's Irische Legende at the Salzburg Festival on 17 August 1955. The production, with Inge Borkh in the leading role and conducted by George Szell, was recorded the same year. Benningsen created the role of Countess Carolina in Henze's Elegie für junge Liebende at the Schwetzingen Festival, on 20 May 1961, alongside Dietrich Fischer-Dieskau in the central role of the Poet.

Benningsen had also an important career as a lieder and concert singer, and she taught singing. Among her students was Jan Zinkler. She was awarded the title Kammersängerin and received the Bavarian Order of Merit in 1970.

She died in Munich at age 89. Her grave is in the Waldfriedhof in Gauting.

== Recordings ==
Benningsen was involved in numerous recordings. Complete opera recordings include:

- Zweite Eule in Werner Egk's Irische Legende, conducted by George Szell
- Magdalene in Die Meistersinger von Nürnberg, conducted by Joseph Keilberth
- Larina in Eugene Onegin

She performed and recorded Bach cantatas with the Münchener Bach-Chor, conducted by Karl Richter, including Es ist euch gut, daß ich hingehe, BWV 108, which she sang with Peter Pears and Kieth Engen. A reviewer wrote: "Lilian Benningsen offers an extremely successful and attractive interpretation which displays Bach's undoubted genius for word painting."
