= Hans Beirer =

Austrian operatic tenor

Hans Beirer (23 June 1911 – 24 June 1993, in Berlin) was an Austrian tenor. In his early career he worked as a lyric tenor but as he aged his voice developed into Heldentenor which enabled him to become a celebrated performer in the operas of Richard Wagner. He was a resident artist of the Deutsche Oper Berlin for more than forty years. He also concurrently worked as a resident artist at the Hamburg State Opera (1958) and Vienna State Opera (1962-1987), and made numerous appearances as a guest artist at opera houses internationally, including La Scala, the Paris Opera, the Royal Opera House in London, the Teatro Colón, La Monnaie, the New York City Opera, and the Bayreuth Festival among others.

== Early life and education ==
Hans Beirer was born in Wiener Neustadt, Austria, on 23 June 1911. He initially studied medicine in Vienna with the intent of becoming a physician. He abandoned his medical training after deciding to pursue a career as a singer. He trained as a tenor at the Vienna Music Academy where he was a pupil of Tino Pattiera and Paul Neuhaus.

== Early career ==
Beirer made his professional opera debut at the Linz State Theatre in 1936; performing the role of Hans in Bedřich Smetana's The Bartered Bride. He was active with Theater Basel and Theater St. Gallen from 1937 through 1939. In the early years of World War II (WWII) he was in Hanover, Germany as a resident artist at the Mellini Theatre where he starred in operettas from 1939 until 1941 when he was conscripted into military service. While working for the military he was still able to perform periodically in operettas in Berlin at the Neues Schauspielhaus where his repertoire included the roles of Danilo in The Merry Widow and Barinkay in The Gypsy Baron. He also made just one appearance at the Deutsche Oper Berlin (DOB) during the war; making his debut at that opera house as Nando in Tiefland in 1943.

== Deutsche Oper Berlin ==
After the end of WWII, Beirer was a resident artist at the DOB for more than forty years with his residency beginning in the 1945-1946 season. His early roles with the company were in lyric tenor parts; performing such roles as Babinský in Schwanda the Bagpiper, Count Almaviva in The Barber of Seville, Don José in Carmen, the Duke of Mantua in Rigoletto, Hans in The Bartered Bride, Rodolfo in La bohème, and Turiddu in Cavalleria rusticana. His voice blossomed from a mid-sized lyric voice into a much larger heldentenor and he became one of the most celebrated Wagnerian tenors of the 20th century. Wagner parts he assailed included Siegfried in both Götterdämmerung and Siegfried, Siegmund in Die Walküre, Tristan in Tristan und Isolde, Walther von Stolzing in Die Meistersinger von Nürnberg, and the title roles in Tannhäuser and Parsifal.

In 1948 Beirer starred in the world premiere of Werner Egk's Circe at the DOB. Other roles he performed from the dramatic tenor repertoire at the DOB included Bacchus in Ariadne auf Naxos, Florestan in Fidelio, Pedro from Tiefland, Radames in Aida, and Vasco da Gama in L'Africaine. In 1972 he performed the role of Aldred in the operetta Die Fledermaus at the DOB. He was seriously injured on the stage of the DOB after a fall during a performance of the title role in Siegfried in 1981; although he managed to complete that evening's performance. His last appearances with the DOB was when he performed the role of Herod in Richard Strauss's Salome on the occasion of his 75th birthday in 1986.

== Other work ==
While working at the DOB, Beirer worked concurrently as a resident artist at the Hamburg State Opera in 1958, and at the Vienna State Opera (VSO) from 1962-1987; performing much of the same repertoire that he performed in Berlin. In 1971 he created the role of the Lord Mayor in Gottfried von Einem’s Der Besuch der alten Dame at the VSO, and five years later performed in the premiere of Einem's Kabale und Liebe. His final appearance in Vienna was as Aegisthus in Strauss's Elektra in 1987.

Beirer worked extensively as a guest artist in opera houses internationally. In 1949 he made his debut at the Teatro di San Carlo as the Drum Major in Alban Berg's Wozzeck, and sang the title role in Parsifal with Maria Callas and Cesare Siepi as his co-stars. He later returned to Rome as Siegmund (1952, 1953, 1957, and 1966) and Tristan (1955 and 1965).

In 1950 he made his American debut at the New York City Opera as Walther von Stolzing. He performed at La Scala in 1950-1951 in the roles of Tannhäuser and Parsifal; repeating the latter role for his debut at the Teatro dell'Opera di Roma in 1951. He later returned to La Scala in 1952 to sing the part of Walther von Stolzing under conductor Wilhelm Furtwängler, and was again heard at that opera house as Tristan (1957) and Tannhäuser (1967).

In 1951 Beirer appeared at the Salzburg Festival as the Drum Major in Wozzeck and as Tamino in The Magic Flute. He made his debut at the Royal Opera House, Covent Garden in 1953 as Siegmund. In 1955 he starred in the Paris Opera's presentation of the complete Ring Cycle in which he sang the part of Siegfried. He returned to Paris many times, performing such parts as the title role in Otello (1957), Tannhäuser (1957), Tristan (1958 and 1968), Erik in The Flying Dutchman (1960), Florestan (1961), Samson in Samson et Dalila (1961), and Siegmund (1968).

In 1957 Beirer portrayed Siegfried at the Teatro Comunale di Bologna. He appeared at the Bayreuth Festival from 1958 through 1962, as Parsifal (1958 and 1962), Tristan (1959), and Tannhäuser (1961). He sang Samson for his debut at the Teatro Nacional de São Carlos in 1961, and appeared in several productions at La Monnaie in 1962-1963. He performed Tristan again for his debut at the Teatro Colón in Buenos Aires in 1963. In 1964 he performed Otello at the Théâtre du Capitole in Toulouse, and he performed in multiple operas at the Opéra National de Lyon in 1964-1965.

Other places he sang leading roles with during his career included the Bavarian State Opera, the Copenhagen Opera House, the Opéra de Marseille, the Staatsoper Stuttgart, and the Teatro Carlo Felice.

== Recordings and film ==
Beirer appeared in Götz Friedrich's films of Salome (1974) and Elektra (1981). He made two complete opera recordings of Parsifal (1958 and 1960), and also appears on complete opera recordings of Tannhäuser, Fidelio, The Magic Flute, Max von Schillings's Mona Lisa, and Der Besuch der alten Dame.
