= Irma Beilke =

German opera singer (1904–1989)

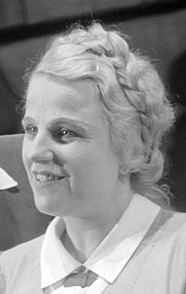
- As Marzelline in Fidelio in 1945, the first opera performance in Berlin after World War II
- Born: 24 August 1904; Berlin, Germany
- Died: 20 December 1989 (aged 85); Berlin, Germany
- Occupations: Operatic soprano; Academic
- Organizations: Städtische Oper Berlin; Vienna State Opera; Musikhochschule Berlin

Irma Beilke (24 August 1904 – 20 December 1989) was a German operatic soprano, concert singer and academic voice teacher. A member of the Städtische Oper Berlin for decades, and also a member of the Vienna State Opera, she appeared in leading roles of the coloratura soprano and lyric soprano repertoire at major opera houses and festivals internationally, such as Mozart's Blonde and Verdi's La traviata. She took part in world premieres, including Capriccio by Richard Strauss. In 1945, she appeared in the first opera performance in Berlin after World War II, as Marzelline in Beethoven's Fidelio.

== Life ==
Born in Berlin, the daughter of a businessman, Beilke received her musical education in Berlin from H. T. Dreyer and Gertrud Wirthschaft. She made her stage debut as a bridesmaid in Weber's Der Freischütz at the Städtische Oper Berlin in 1926, where she remained until 1928. She then moved to the Oldenburgisches Staatstheater and further in 1930 to the Leipzig Opera. Besides coloratura soprano roles, she took roles from the lyric soprano repertoire. In 1936, she returned to Berlin. She appeared in the opening performance after World War II, as Marzelline in Beethoven's Fidelio, conducted by Robert Heger, on 4 September at the Theater des Westens, where the Städtische Oper had to play because the opera house had been destroyed. She gave her final performance there in 1958 as Mimì.

Beilke had guest contracts with the Berlin State Opera, in Leipzig, with the Bavarian State Opera in Munich, and with the Vienna State Opera, where she appeared from 1941 to 1945. Her Vienna roles included Menotti's Amelia Goes to the Ball and Regina in Mathis der Maler in 1948.

As a guest, Beilke performed as Blonde in Mozart's Die Entführung aus dem Serail at the Glyndebourne Festival in 1936 and the Royal Opera House in London in 1938, where she also appeared as Papagena in Die Zauberflöte, Marzelline in Fidelio, and Sophie in Der Rosenkavalier. She also gave guest performances in Paris, Brussels, Antwerp, Milan, Florence, Barcelona, Zagreb and Belgrade. In 1950, she appeared in Dublin as Mimì in Puccini's La bohème and sang the title role of Verdi's La traviata.

She performed in world premieres, in Hans Stieber's Der Eulenspiegel in Leipzig in 1936, Julius Weismann's Die pfiffige Magd in 1939, the title role of Winfried Zillig's Die Windsbraut in 1941, as an Italian singer in Capriccio by Richard Strauss in 1942, and in Boris Blacher's Preußisches Märchen at the Berlin State Opera in 1952.

She appeared at the Salzburg Festival from 1939, as Blonde in Die Entführung aus dem Serail, Susanna in Mozart's Le nozze di Figaro in 1942, and Pamina in Die Zauberflöte in 1943, when she also sang the soprano solo in Beethoven's Ninth Symphony.

Beilke was also a concert singer and was engaged for roles in music films. Many of her performances were recorded on vinyl. From 1954, she gave private singing lessons. From 1958, after retiring from the stage, she was a professor at the Musikhochschule Berlin until 1968. She was appointed an honorary member of the Berlin State Opera in 1980.

Beilke died in Berlin.

== Other opera roles ==
Other roles of Beilke's repertoire included:

- Colombina in Arlecchino (Berlin, 1946)
- Despina in Così fan tutte
- Frau Fluth in Die lustigen Weiber von Windsor
- Title role in Undine
- Title role in Manon
- Rose Friquet in Les dragons de Villars
- Lola in Cavalleria rusticana
- Voice of the forest bird in Siegfried
- Norina in Don Pasquale
- Agnes in Der arme Heinrich
- Gilda in Rigoletto
- Oscar in Un ballo in maschera
