= The Countess Cathleen =

Play written by William Butler Yeats

The Countess Cathleen is a verse drama by William Butler Yeats in blank verse (with some lyrics). It was dedicated to Maud Gonne, the object of his affections for many years.

== Editions and revisions ==
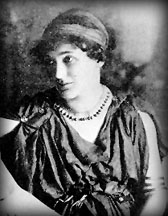
Florence Farr as "Aleel" in The Countess Cathleen

The play was first published in 1892 in The Countess Kathleen and Various Legends and Lyrics (the spelling was changed to "Cathleen" in all future editions). Its text underwent many changes until the final version performed in 1911 and published in 1912 ("a complete revision to make it suitable for performance at the Abbey Theatre" and "all but a new play", according to Yeats). The variorum editor, Russell K. Alspach, remarks, "The revision for the second printing, Poems (1895), was so drastic that intelligible collation was virtually impossible." The tendency of Yeats's changes between 1892 and 1911 has been summarized as a move "decidedly away from an almost farcical realism and tentatively toward the austere, suggestive mode of the dance plays."

== Synopsis ==
The play is set ahistorically in Ireland during a famine. The idealistic Countess of the title sells her soul to the devil so that she can save her tenants from starvation and from damnation for having sold their own souls. After her death, she is redeemed as her motives were altruistic and ascends to Heaven.

== Sources ==
Yeats based the play on a purported Irish legend, "The Countess Cathleen O'Shea", which had been printed in an Anglo-Irish newspaper in 1867. When he later attempted to trace its origins, the story appeared to have been adapted into English from a French story, "Les marchands d'âmes", whose protagonist was named "comtesse Ketty O'Connor". This original French version appeared in the anthology, Les matinées de Timothée Trimm, by Léo Lespès without further provenance.

== Performances ==
The play was first performed on 8 May 1899 as the Irish Literary Theatre's inaugural production, in the Antient Concert Rooms, Great Brunswick Street, Dublin.

On 21 February 1911, Yeats attended an "amateurish" performance of the play by the Dramatic Society of the Norwich High School Old Girls' Association.

The first performance at the Abbey Theatre, in the much-changed final version, took place on 14 December 1911.

It was performed in Frankfurt in a German translation in 1934 staged by Friedrich Bethge and featuring Paul Verhoeven; the city awarded Yeats its Goethe Plaque of the City of Frankfurt for it.

== Reception ==
=== Influence on Joyce ===
Oona's chanted song from Act II, "Who will go drive with Fergus now?" (removed from the 1911 version) made a deep impression on a seventeen-year-old James Joyce in Anna Mather's 1899 performance. Richard Ellmann reports that Joyce "set the poem to music and praised it as the best lyric in the world." According to Stanislaus Joyce, James sang the song at his dying brother George's request in 1902, to this chant of his own composition. In the opening episode of Ulysses, Buck Mulligan chants the song and Stephen Dedalus works several variations on it ("parodically", but "not simply ... parody").

Joyce also has Stephen Dedalus recall Cathleen's dying words ("Bend down your faces, Oona and Aleel...") in A Portrait of the Artist as a Young Man.

=== Anti-English ===
Frederick Sefton Delmer described the play in 1911 as anti-English: "The anti-English tendency underlying the play is evident, the merchant-demons being the English landlords."

=== Opera ===
Werner Egk wrote the libretto for his 1955 opera Irische Legende based on Yeats's work.
