= Michael Bohnen =

German opera singer (1887–1965)

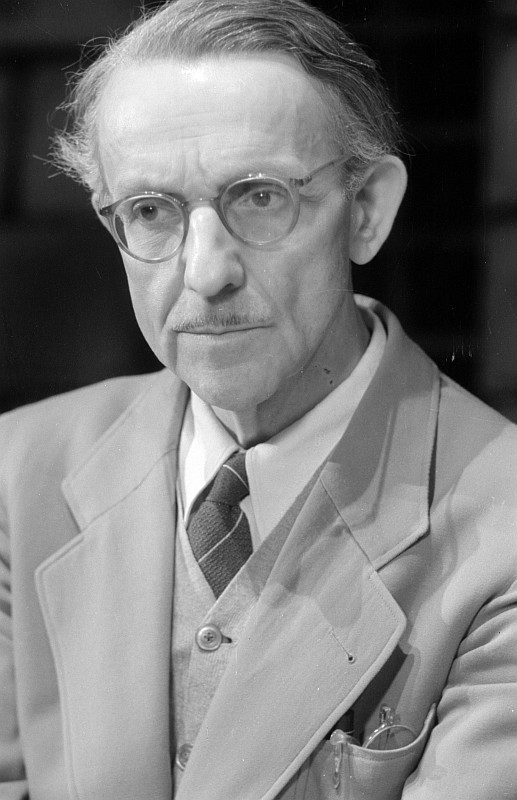
Michael Bohnen as intendent of the Deutsche Oper Berlin, 1945

Franz Michael Bohnen (2 May 1887 – 26 April 1965) was a German bass baritone opera singer and actor. Bohnen was very popular in the Roaring Twenties.

== Life ==
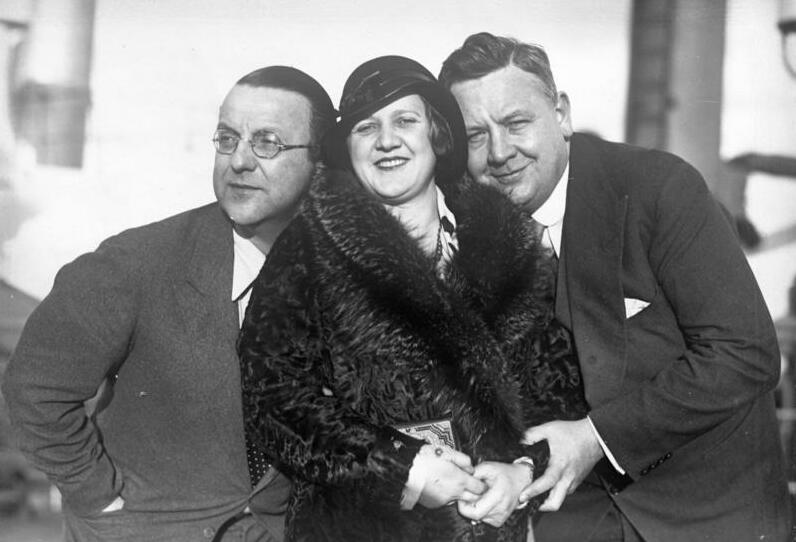
Michael Bohnen (left) with Elisabeth Rethberg and Lauritz Melchior en route to New York City, 1932

Michael Bohnen was born in Cologne. He trained in opera singing at the Hochschule für Musik Köln with composer and conductor Fritz Steinbach and Rudolf Schulz-Dornburg and with a private tutor, making his debut in 1910 at the Stadttheater Düsseldorf. In 1912, he appeared at the Hoftheater Wiesbaden. From 1912 onwards he was a member of the Hofoper Berlin and from 1914 onwards appeared regularly at the Bayreuther Festspiele. He served in the early years of the First World War, but was recalled to the Berliner Hofoper in 1916. In 1922 he sang at the Metropolitan Opera in New York. In 1925, he played Baron Ochs von Lerchenau in a film of the opera Der Rosenkavalier. After the war, Bohnen joined the Metropolitan Opera in New York in 1922, and spent 1933 to 1934 in Buenos Aires. He had an affair with La Jana and entered into a long correspondence with her, now held by his granddaughter.

In Germany, he also became popular as a spoken-word actor. In 1934, he returned to Berlin, first to the Staatsoper, then from 1935 to 1945 in the Deutschen Oper Berlin and after the end of the Second World War until 1947 as intendant of these halls (where he still sang until 1951) and as president of the Kammer der Kunstschaffenden. His time as intendant at the Städtischen Oper Berlin had to come to an end due to an accusation by his pupil, the tenor Hans Beirer, during the denazification process. His rehabilitation during the following years was slow, even though Beirer's accusation was quickly revealed as false. Bohnen thus died in complete poverty, with only a small wage from the city of Berlin. Bohnen died of acute heart failure in his Berlin apartment on 26 April 1965, at age 77. He is buried in the Friedhof Heerstraße.

== Partial filmography ==
- The Mistress of the World (1919, serial), as Consul Madsen
- President Barrada (1920)
- The Adventurer (1922), as Van Hamm
- Lowlands (1922), as Sebastiano
- Der Rosenkavalier (1926), as Baron Ochs von Lerchenau
- Heads Up, Charley (1927), as John Jacob Bunjes
- The Gypsy Baron (1927), as Kálmán Zsupán
- Sajenko the Soviet (1928), as Sajenko
- Casanova (1928) as Casanova
- Victoria and Her Hussar (1931), as John Cunlight
- Viennese Waltz (1932)
- Gold (1934), as John Wills
- The Private Life of Louis XIV (1935), as King Louis XIV
- The King's Prisoner (1935), as King Augustus the Strong
- Augustus the Strong (1936), as King Augustus the Strong
- Mother Song (1937)
- The Immortal Heart (1939), as Martin Behaim
- The Rothschilds (1940), as Wilhelm von Hesse
- Beloved Augustin (1940), as Emperor Leopold
- Münchhausen (1943), as Duke Charles of Brunswick

== Honours ==
- 1957 Großes Bundesverdienstkreuz via Prof. Theodor Heuss
- 1952 Goethe Preisträger
- Ehrenmitglied der Deutschen Oper Berlin
- Ehrenpensionär der Metropolitan Opera New York
- Ständige Ausstellung seines Familienwappenringes im Foyer der Metropolitan Opera New York
- Gedenktafel am Geburtshaus in Köln, Friesenwall 102
- Gedenktafel am Standort der alten Jugendstil Oper in Köln, Habsburgerring 13
- Gedenktafel am langjährigen Wohnhaus in Berlin, Kurfürstendamm 50
- Würdigung mit der Widmung der Straße Michael-Bohnen-Ring in the High-Deck-Siedlung, Neukölln, Berlin
- Ehrengrab auf dem Prominentenfriedhof Berlin Heerstraße.
