= The Adventurer (1922 film) =

1922 film directed by Lothar Mendes

- Directed by: Lothar Mendes
- Produced by: Michael Bohnen
- Starring: Michael Bohnen; Rudolf Forster; Olga Limburg
- Production companies: Michael Bohnen-Film; Ring-Film
- Distributed by: Orbis-Film
- Release date: 6 January 1922
- Country: Germany
- Languages: Silent; German intertitles

The Adventurer (German: Der Abenteurer) is a 1922 German silent film directed by Lothar Mendes and starring Michael Bohnen, Rudolf Forster and Olga Limburg.

== Cast ==
- Michael Bohnen as Van Hamm
- Rudolf Forster as Bergström
- Olga Limburg as Nelly Murdfield
- Robert Leffler as Joshua Hunter, Farmer
- Hanni Weisse as Maud, seine Tochter
- Herbert Stock as Walker, der Wirt
- Edith Meller as Lizzi, seine Tochter
- Maria Forescu as Peddy, seine Frau
- Georg John as der rote Johnny
- Alfred Viebach as Conte d'Avido
- Georg H. Schnell as Verwalter der Farm
- Paul Rehkopf as Wirt der Hafenkneipe

== Bibliography ==
- Quinlan, David (1983). The Illustrated Guide to Film Directors. London: Batsford. ISBN 978-0-7134-3780-5.
