= Oskar Czerwenka =

Austrian opera singer

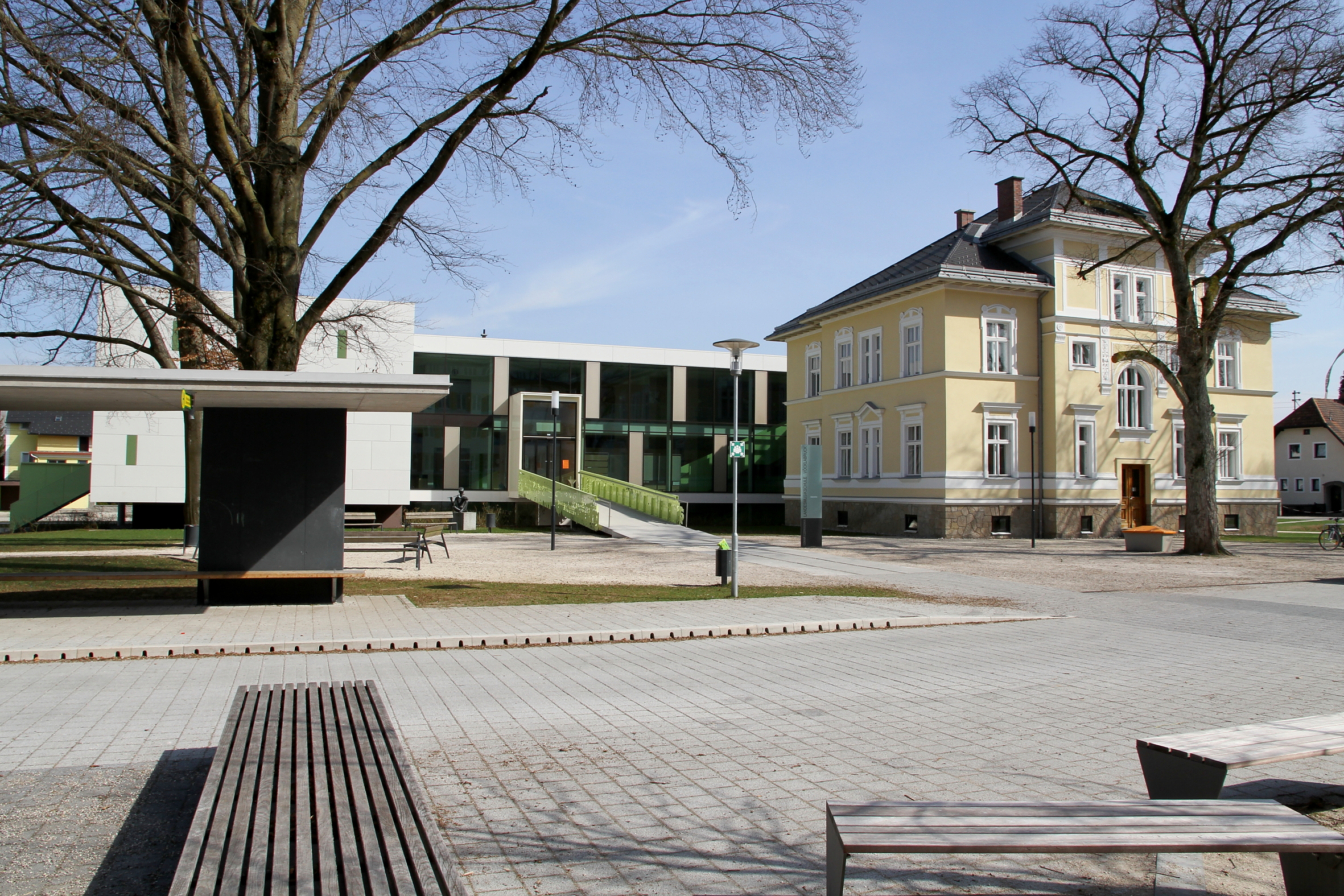
- The singer's villa was integrated in a state music school, which was named after him
- Born: 5 July 1924; Vöcklabruck
- Died: 1 June 2000 (aged 75)
- Occupations: Operatic bass; Academic teacher
- Organizations: Vienna State Opera
- Awards: Kammersänger; Honorary member of the Vienna State Opera; Honorary citizen of Vöcklabruck; State music school in his name

Oskar Czerwenka (5 July 1924 – 1 June 2000) was an Austrian operatic bass and academic teacher. He was a member of the Vienna State Opera from 1951 to 1986, performing in 75 roles, including his signature role as Ochs auf Lerchenau, and participated in premieres of new operas. In addition to his singing career, Czerwenka was an author, visual artist, and illustrator, and also performed in concerts. He received several awards during his lifetime, and the state music school in his hometown was named in his honor.

== Career ==
Born in Vöcklabruck, Czerwenka grew up there. He studied international commerce and then began private opera studies in Vienna with Otto Iro. He made his debut on stage at the Graz Opera in 1947. He became a member of the Vienna State Opera in 1951, where he stayed to 1986, appearing in 1084 performances at the house. He also appeared at the Volksoper Wien and at major opera houses worldwide. He performed at the Salzburg Festival from 1953 and made his debut at the Metropolitan Opera in 1959.

Czerwenka sang 75 operatic parts, including his signature role Ochs auf Lerchenau in Der Rosenkavalier by Richard Strauss. Other notable roles were Osmin in Mozart's Die Entführung aus dem Serail, Kezal in Smetana's Die verkaufte Braut, Graf Waldner in Arabella, and La Roche in Capriccio. He was Bartolo both in Rossini's Barber as in Mozart's. Czerwenka took part in opera premiere performances, such as Gottfried von Einem's Der Prozeß at the 1953 Salzburg Festival, Werner Egk's Irische Legende in 1955, and a title role in Giselher Klebe's Jacobowsky und der Oberst which premiered in Hamburg in 1965 and was also shown at the Metropolitan Opera. He took part in the premiere of Iván Erőd's opera Die Seidenraupen (The Silkworms) in 1968 during the Wiener Festwochen at the Theater an der Wien. He became known in the 1970s singing the part of Tevje in Anatevka (Fiddler on the Roof).

Czerwenka sang Lieder and oratorio in concert and for recordings. He died in his hometown.

== Artist, illustrator, writer ==
As a visual artist, Czerwenka held exhibitions in Graz, Munich, Salzburg, and Vienna. In 1963, he illustrated the book Kon-Figurationen, which featured texts by Ernst Pichler. He also authored several books, including his autobiography Jenseits vom Prater, published in 1998.

- Wo's mir schmeckt. Eine kulinarische Reise durch Oberösterreich und Salzburg. Stieglitz, Mühlacker 1982.
- Lebenszeiten. Ungebetene Briefe. Neff, Wien 1988, ISBN 3-7014-0260-4.
- Jenseits vom Prater. Erlebtes – Erlittenes – Empfundenes. Ueberreuter, Vienna 1998, ISBN 3-8000-3697-5.

== Awards ==
Czerwenka received several honours and awards, including:

- Title Kammersänger (1962)
- Title Professor (1976)
- Ehrenring and Girardi-Medal of Graz (1983)
- Ehrenring and Honorary membership of the Vienna State Opera (1983)
- Honorary citizen of Vöcklabruck (1999)

In 2008, the Landesmusikschule Vöcklabruck (state music school) of Upper Austria moved to the former residence of the singer and an additional new building, and was named after him: Oskar Czerwenka Landesmusikschule.

== Literature ==
- David M. Cummings (ed.): International Who’s Who in Music and Musicians Directory. 14. Auflage. Melrose Press Ltd., Cambridge, UK, ISBN 0-948875-71-2, p. 208.
- Peter Dusek, Volkmar Parschalk: Nicht nur Tenöre. Das Beste aus der Opernwerkstatt. Herausgegeben von den Freunden der Wiener Staatsoper. Jugend und Volk, Wien 1988, ISBN 3-224-16912-5 (Vol. 3).
- Oesterreichisches Musiklexikon. Éditions of the Austrian Academy of Sciences, Vienna 2002, ISBN 3-7001-3043-0 (volume 1) p. 294.
- The New Grove Dictionary of Music and Musicians. Macmillan, London 1980.
