= Francis Burt (composer) =

British composer

- Born: 28 April 1926; London, UK
- Died: 3 October 2012 (aged 86); Hartberg, Styria, Austria
- Education: Cambridge University; Royal Academy of Music; Musikhochschule Berlin
- Occupations: Composer; Academic teacher
- Organizations: Musikhochschule Wien
- Awards: Preis der Stadt Wien für Musik; Decoration of Honour for Services to the Republic of Austria

Francis Burt (28 April 1926 – 3 October 2012) was a British composer and academic teacher who spent most of his life in Austria. He was professor of composition at the Musikhochschule Wien, and organised the 1 Long Night of New Sounds concert series at the Vienna Konzerthaus. He composed the ballet Der Golem, operas, orchestral works, and music for ensembles and for voices.

== Life ==
Born in London, Burt attended St Edward's School in Oxford in 1944 and 1945 as part of an officer's training. He completed a course as an engineer at Cambridge University and served as a first lieutenant in Nigeria from 1946 to 1947. He studied at the Royal Academy of Music from 1948 to 1951, where he became a composition pupil of Howard Ferguson. He also attended the Summer School of Music at Bryanston and Dartington. Subsequently, he was a student at the Musikhochschule Berlin, studying composition with Boris Blacher.

After spending a year in Rome and London, Burt moved to Vienna in 1956 where he knew Gottfried von Einem. From 1973, Burt was professor of composition at the Musikhochschule Wien, where he also headed the Institute for Electroacoustics from 1989 to 1991. He was emerited in 1992. In 1987, Burt was the organiser of the 1 Long Night of New Sounds at the Vienna Konzerthaus.

Burt died in Hartberg, Styria, at the age of 86, and was buried at the Vienna Central Cemetery.

== Awards ==
- 1981: Preis der Stadt Wien für Musik
- 1992: Decoration of Honour for Services to the Republic of Austria.

== Work ==
Burt's compositions were inspired by African traditions, such as the drumming of Nigerian Ibo people. He focused on dance elements with rhythmic gestures, for example in his ballet Der Golem of 1963. The ballet was premiered at the Landestheater Hannover on 31 January 1965, choreographed by Yvonne Georgi and conducted by Günther Wich. It was performed at the Vienna State Opera in 1983, conducted by Stefan Soltesz.

In a 1976 song cycle with orchestra, Unter der blanken Hacke des Monds after poetry by Peter Huchel, Burt began to compose layers of sounds rather than rhythmic structures. Later, he was influenced by electronic music, but still with noticeable tonal centres. His compositions were published by Universal Edition.

Burt wrote works of many genres, including operas, choral and vocal compositions and works for instruments:

=== Stage works ===
- Volpone or The Fox, opera in four acts based on the play by Ben Jonson, op. 9 (1952–1961)
- Der Golem, ballet in one scene by Erika Hanka, Yvonne Georgi and Francis Burt, op. 11 (1959–1963)
- Barnstable oder Jemand auf dem Dachboden, opera in one act based on the play Barnstable by James Saunders in the translation by Hilde Spiel, op. 13 (1967–1969)
- Mahan, opera in seven scenes after a libretto by Richard Bletschacher (1996–2007)

=== Ensemble ===
- String Quartet No. 1, op. 2 (1951–1952)
- Musik für zwei Klaviere, for two pianos (1953)
- Duo, for clarinet and piano, op. 7 (1954)
- For William, for nine players (1988)
- Echoes, for nine players (1988–1989)
- Für Alfred Schlee, a postmodern birthday greeting for string quartet (1991)
- Hommage à Jean-Henri Fabre, a bucolic fantasy, for five players (1993–1994)
- String Quartet No. 2 (1993–1994)
- Bavarian Gentians, for chamber choir and six instrumental soloists (2001)
- Variationen eines alten Liedes, variations of an old song for clarinet, akkordion, viola and double bass (2012)

=== Orchestral ===
- Jamben, for orchestra (1953)
- The Skull, cantata for tenor and orchestra (revised), op. 6 (1955)
- Espressione Orchestrale, for orchestra (1958–1959)
- Fantasmagoria, for orchestra, op. 12 (1963)
- Unter der blanken Hacke des Monds, for baritone and orchestra, after poems by Peter Huchel (1974–1976)
- Und GOtt der HErr sprach, reflections after a Golden Wedding for mezzo-soprano, baritone, bass, two mixed choirs and large orchestra (1983)
- Morgana, five scenes for orchestra (1985–1986)
- Blind Visions, for oboe and small orchestra (1995)
- Mohn und Gedächtnis (for Paul Celan), for ensemble (2010)

=== Choral music ===
- Two songs of David, for choir a cappella, op. 1 (1951)
- Mariens Wiegenlied, for choir a cappella (2011)

=== Solo ===
- Three little piano pieces for J. J. (1949)
