= High-Deck Estate =

Housing estate in Berlin

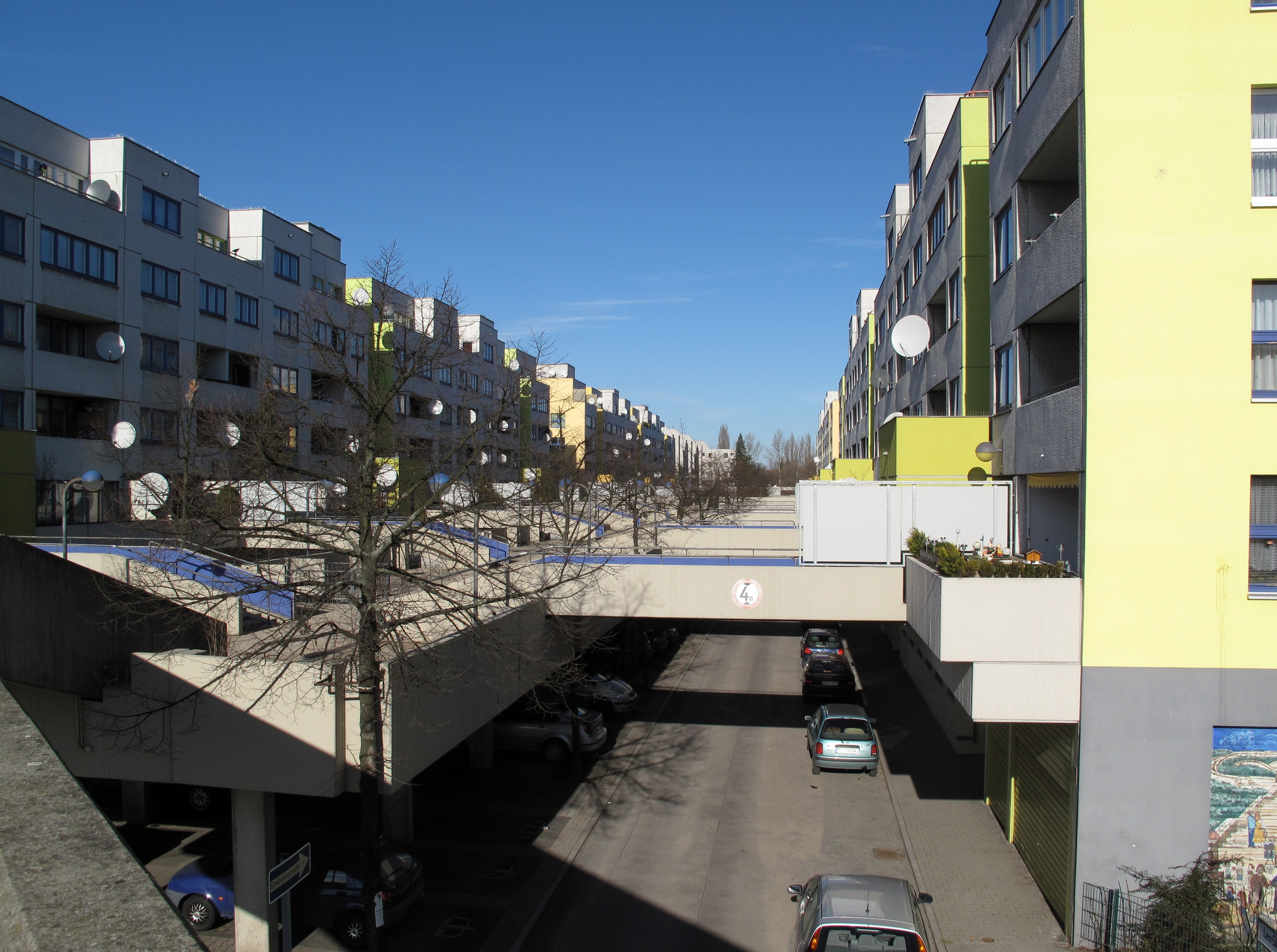
High deck on Leo-Slezak-Straße

The High-Deck Estate is a large housing estate with approximately 6,000 residents in the Berlin district of Neukölln. Constructed in the 1970s and 1980s as part of a social housing programme, the estate's urban planning concept diverged from the high-density, high-rise construction of estates like the Märkisches Viertel or Gropiusstadt. It prioritized the separation of pedestrian and motor traffic through elevated, landscaped walkways (the "high decks") connecting predominantly five- to six-storey buildings with around 2,400 flats. Roads and garages with over 1,000 parking spaces are located below these decks. Within 25 years of its construction, the innovative concept was widely regarded as unsuccessful.

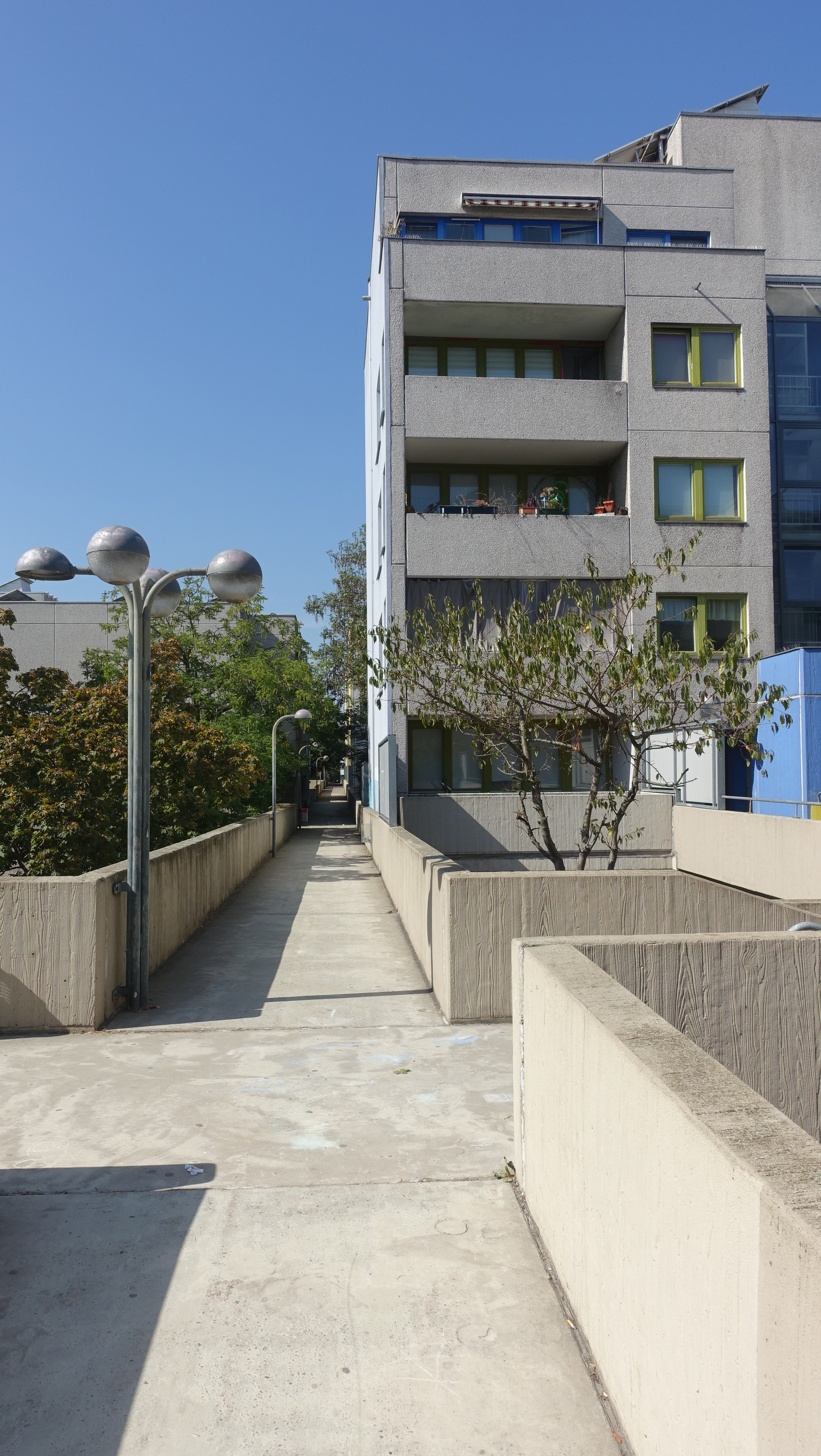
Cross-connection bridge of the decks, 2024

In the 1970s, the flats were highly sought after for their layout and location on the green outskirts of West Berlin, near the Berlin Wall bordering the East Berlin district of Treptow. After German reunification, the estate lost its quiet border location, becoming less attractive and evolving into a social hotspot in the 1990s due to segregation. The estate is primarily home to residents with a migration background from the Arab world. By 2007, over half of the residents relied on transfer payments. Berlin has implemented neighbourhood management programmes and social and art projects to revitalize the estate.

Since November 2020, the High-Deck Estate has been a listed building.

== Location and building site ==
The 32-hectare High-Deck Estate is situated on both sides of Sonnenallee in Berlin's Neukölln district. A bridge house constructed in 1982 over Sonnenallee, known as the "gateway to the estate", connects the two parts. Neuköllnische Allee borders the estate to the southwest, while Von-der-Schulenburg-Park on Hänselstraße and Herbert-Krause-Park, with the training centre of the Neukölln Nature Conservation and Green Space Office on Jupiterstraße, mark the northwest boundary. The Heidekampgraben green corridor, part of the Berlin Wall Trail, defines the eastern and northeastern boundary, separating Neukölln from the Baumschulenweg district in the Treptow-Köpenick borough. Until reunification, this corridor marked the border between West and East Berlin.

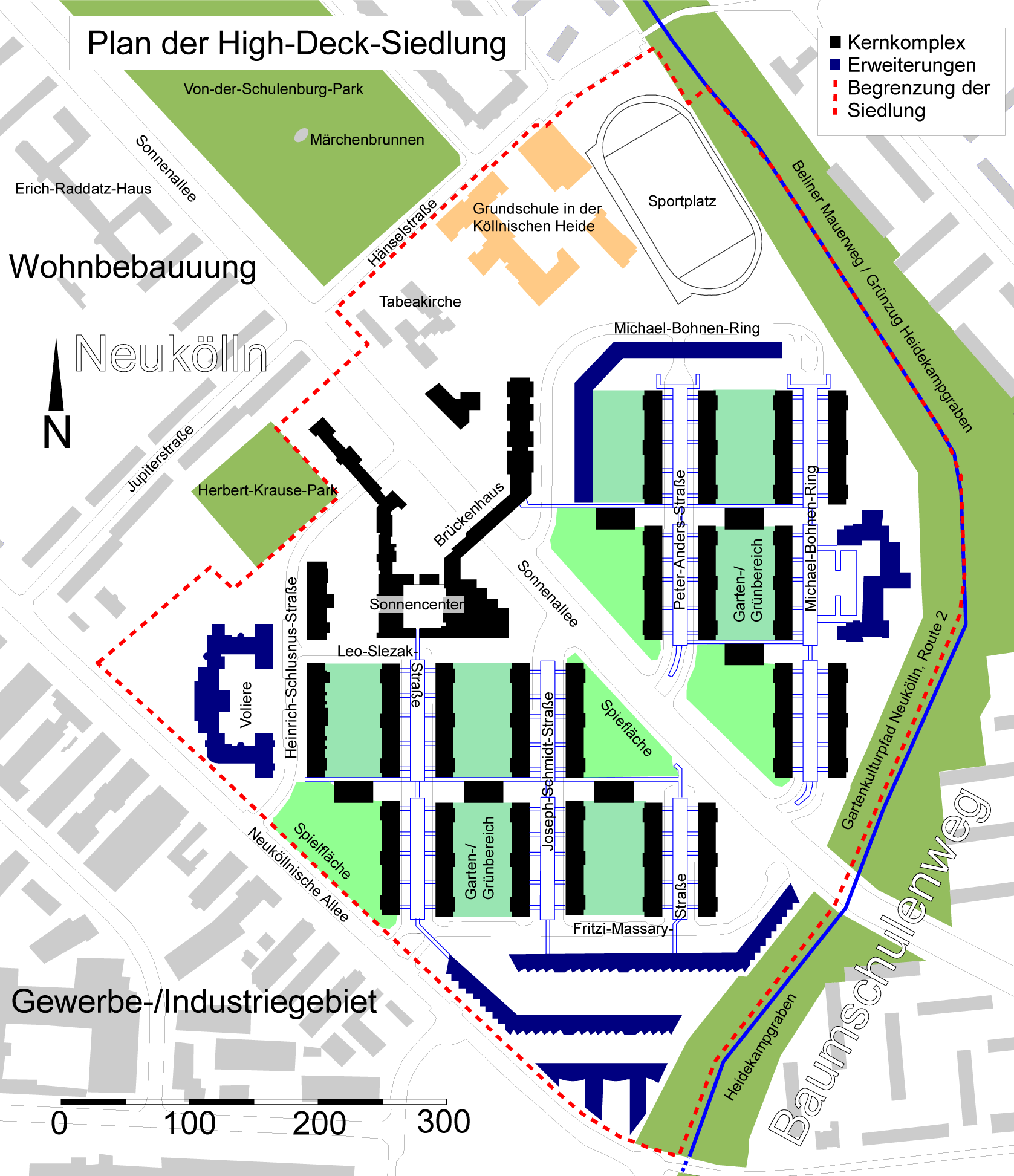
Location of the High-Deck Estate

The estate occupies part of the former Köllnische Heide, a once-extensive forest and meadow area in the Berlin glacial valley. The adjacent Königsheide, east of the Britzer Verbindungskanal, is a remnant of this forest. Since the 1950s, a church hall with a freestanding bell tower and a daycare centre for the Tabea congregation of the Protestant Church of Berlin-Brandenburg-Silesian Upper Lusatia have stood on the northwestern edge.

== Urban development concept ==
=== Background and competition ===
In 1970, the West Berlin Senate launched an urban planning competition for the High-Deck Estate. The choice of the Köllnische Heide site was politically motivated, as Berliner Fertigbau, partly owned by trade unions, faced a lack of orders after completing the Märkisches Viertel. To sustain the prefabricated construction industry, the Senate provided new opportunities through the tender. The competition jury, including Berliner Fertigbau representatives, evaluated designs for suitability for serial production.

=== Winning design – A departure from "Urbanity Through Density" ===
In 1970, architects Rainer Oefelein and Bernhard Freund's innovative design was selected. Unlike three-quarters of submissions that followed the high-rise, car-friendly model prevalent in Berlin, their design responded to criticism of such structures, proposing a self-sufficient, family- and child-friendly "city within the city." The concept balanced urban density with green, tranquil spaces, separating car traffic (lower level) from pedestrian areas (upper level) to create a multifunctional pedestrian zone.

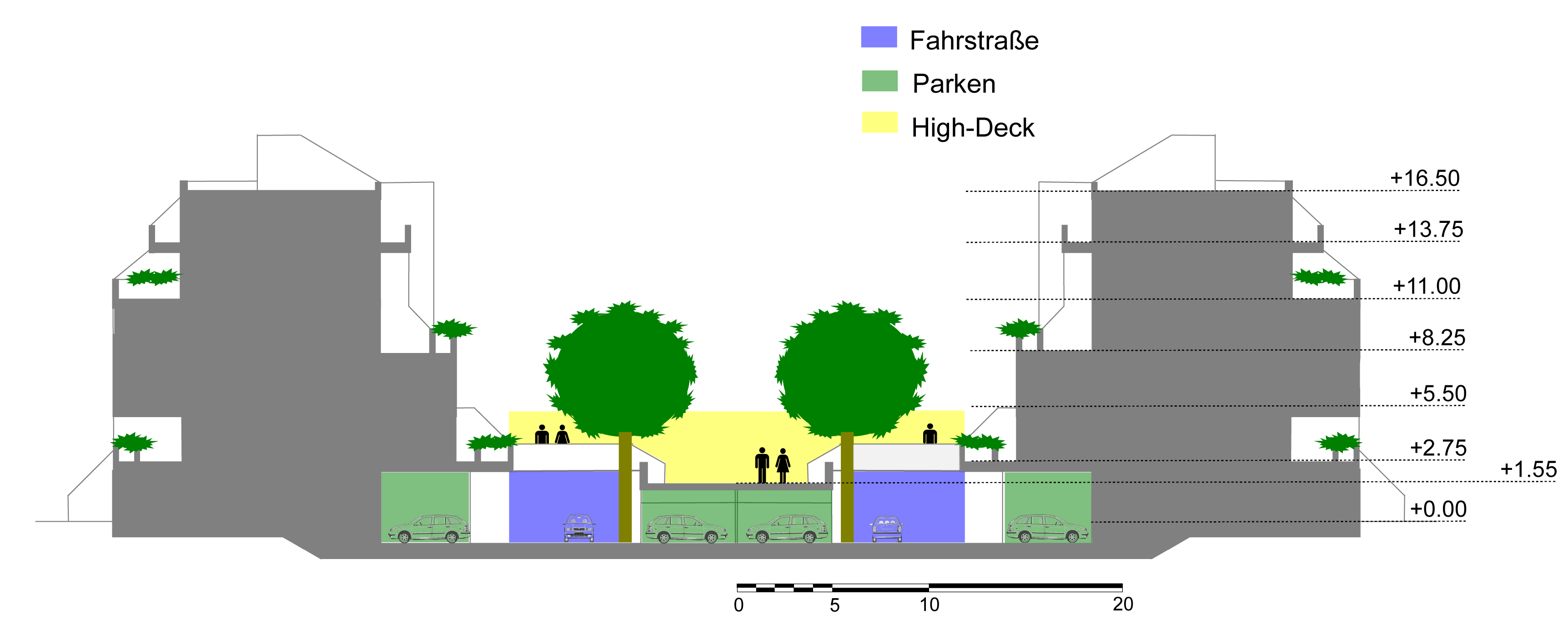
Cross-section based on the Oefelein/Freund design. The planned terracing was not implemented, and by 2011, trees had not reached the height needed for the intended avenue-like impression.

The design aimed to reconcile urban public spaces with private green areas, leveraging Sonnenallee's topography to separate traffic levels. However, Berliner Fertigbau's 1950s-era serial production limited architectural flexibility, preventing the planned terraced layout and restricting façades to exposed aggregate concrete or tile. Concerns about tile durability led to the use of exposed aggregate concrete. Cost constraints from Housing subsidies curtailed plans for staircases and ramps as communication and play areas, and plant troughs for balustrades were scrapped due to maintenance costs. Despite these compromises, the concept was initially praised as a typological innovation in European housing construction, inspired by English models of traffic separation.

== Construction ==
Built between 1975 and 1984, with initial occupancy in 1976, the estate was developed by Stadt und Land Wohnbauten-Gesellschaft mbH, a subsidiary of Gemeinnützige Siedlungs- und Wohnungsbaugesellschaft Berlin mbH (GSW), then city-owned. GSW managed construction, while Berliner Fertigbau handled execution. The estimated cost was 400 million marks (approximately 444 million euros in today's currency).

=== The High Decks ===
The estate features 414 parking spaces under the decks and 309 garage spaces in apartment basements by 2019. Elevated high decks, 3.33 meters high and 10 meters wide, serve as pedestrian walkways, accessible via ramps and stairs. Narrow bridge walkways, one meter higher, connect to apartment block entrances. Ten high decks were built—five north and five south of Sonnenallee—with two decks spanning three streets, three spanning one street, and one isolated deck, all connected by approximately 100 smaller footbridges.

=== Building structures and flats ===
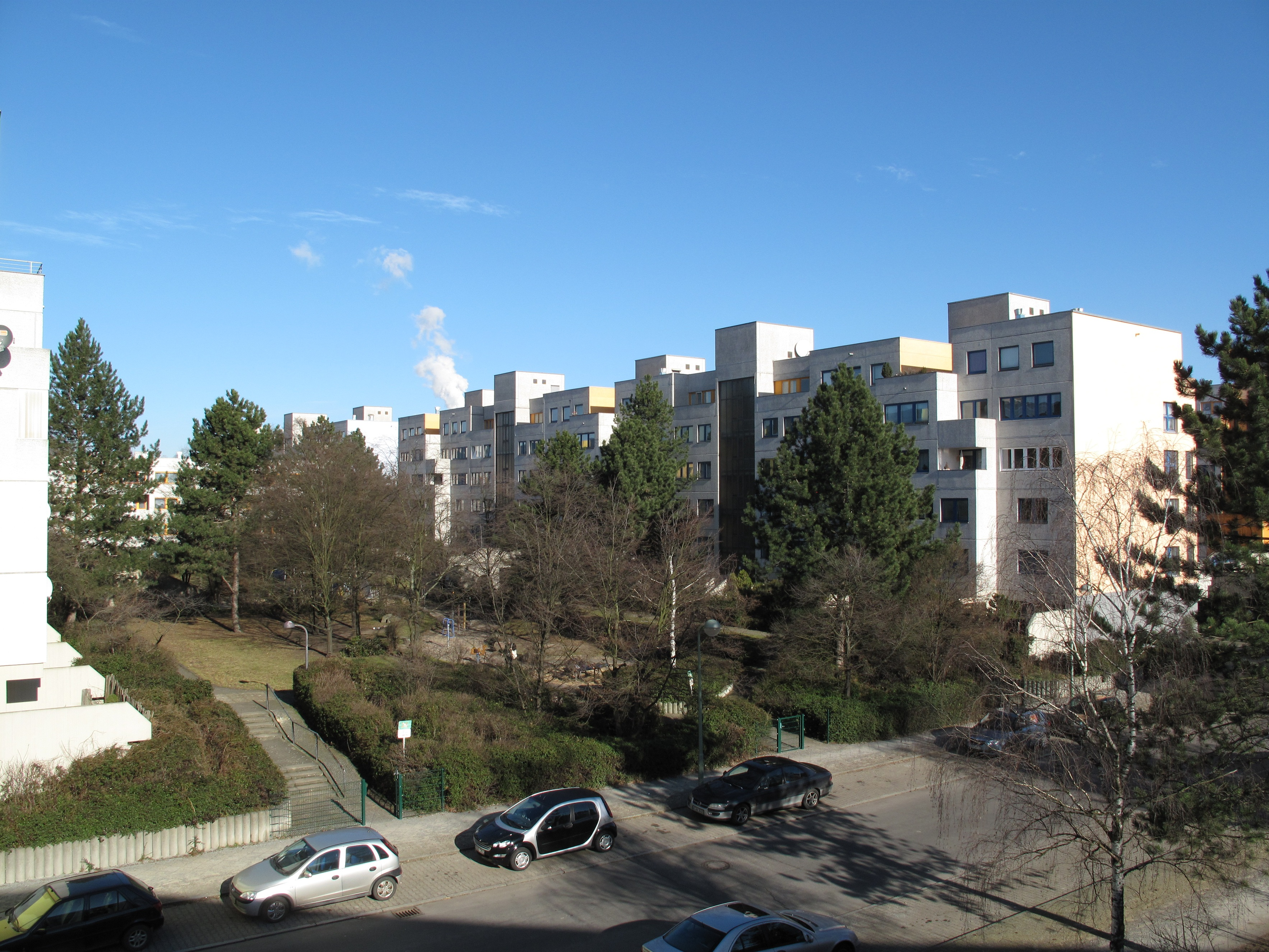
Garden courtyard between apartment blocks on Leo-Slezak-Straße/Heinrich-Schlusnus-Straße; Fritzi-Massary-Straße in the foreground

Three construction types were used:

- Five- to six-storey central buildings along the high decks.
- Rows resembling garden sheds, closing off green courtyards at cross-connections of the high-deck network.
- A westernmost row with street-level entrances, unconnected to the decks.

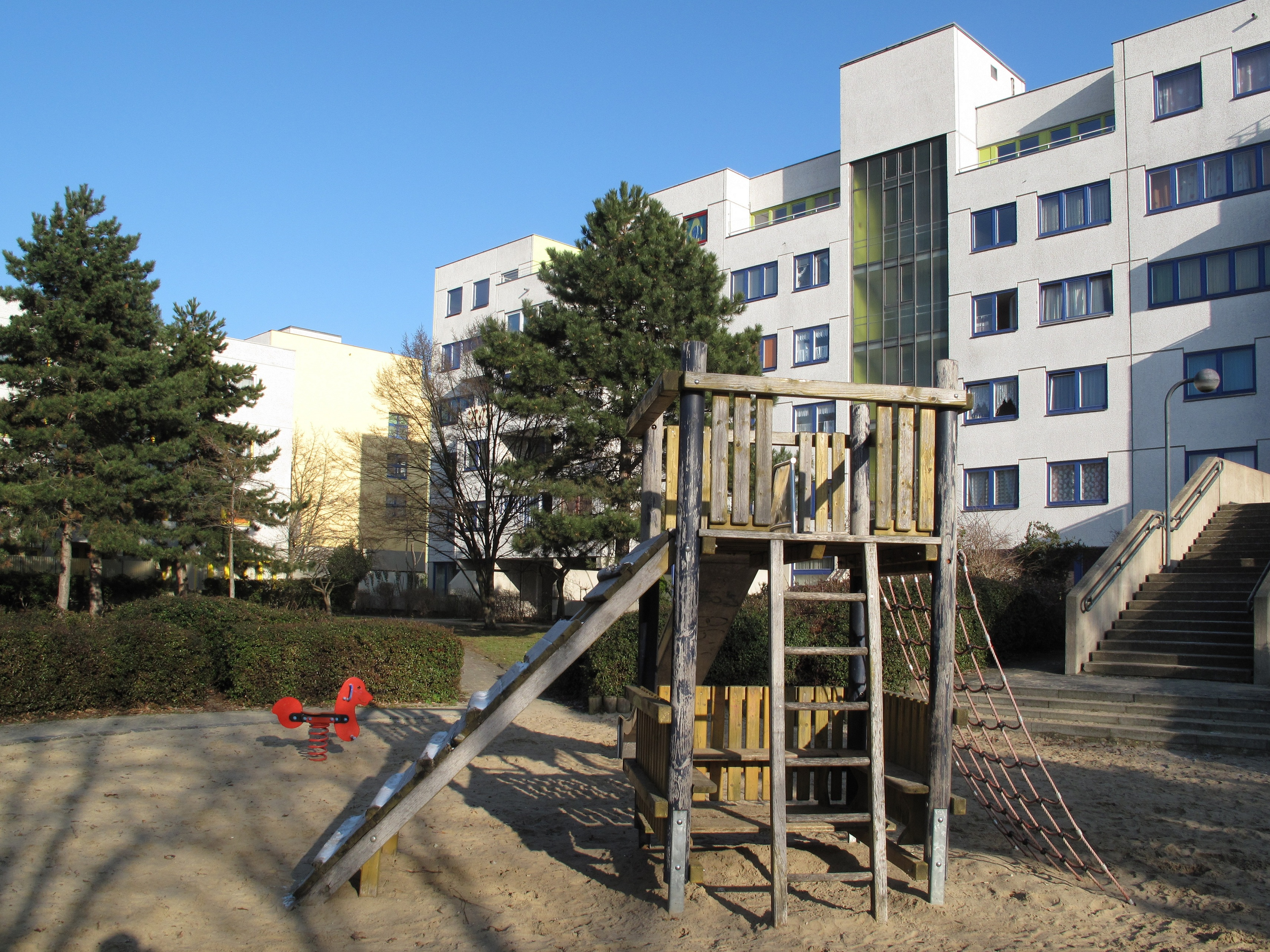
Playground at Heinrich-Schlusnus-Straße and Neuköllnische Allee

Flats are accessed via individual staircases and lifts, serving two or three units per floor (two- and three-room flats). Fifteen percent are 1.5-room flats (45 m^{2}), 20% are two-room (55–65 m^{2}) or 2.5-room (75 m^{2}) flats, 35% are three-room (85 m^{2}) or 3.5-room (109 m^{2}) flats, and 30% are four- or five-room flats (up to 116 m^{2}). Smaller flats for seniors face the courtyard, while others open to both sides. Flats include fitted kitchens, dining areas, living rooms, bedrooms, hallways, separate bathrooms/toilets, and conservatories, roof terraces, or loggias, with ample window space for good lighting.

=== Infrastructure, outdoor facilities, and green areas ===
Twenty internal rooms (40–60 m^{2}) along road axes were intended for hobby rooms, table tennis, saunas, or laundry but saw limited use. Some were converted into guest apartments, while others support neighbourhood management projects. In 1977, the estate gained an all-day school, daycare centre, sports facility, and the Sonnencenter shopping centre with 24 commercial units, including supermarkets, a bakery, hairdressing salon, drugstore, pharmacy, optician, flower shop, textile shop, physiotherapy practice, snack bar, and restaurants. The four-storey bridge building over Sonnenallee, built between 1980 and 1982, directs pedestrian traffic to the Sonnencenter.

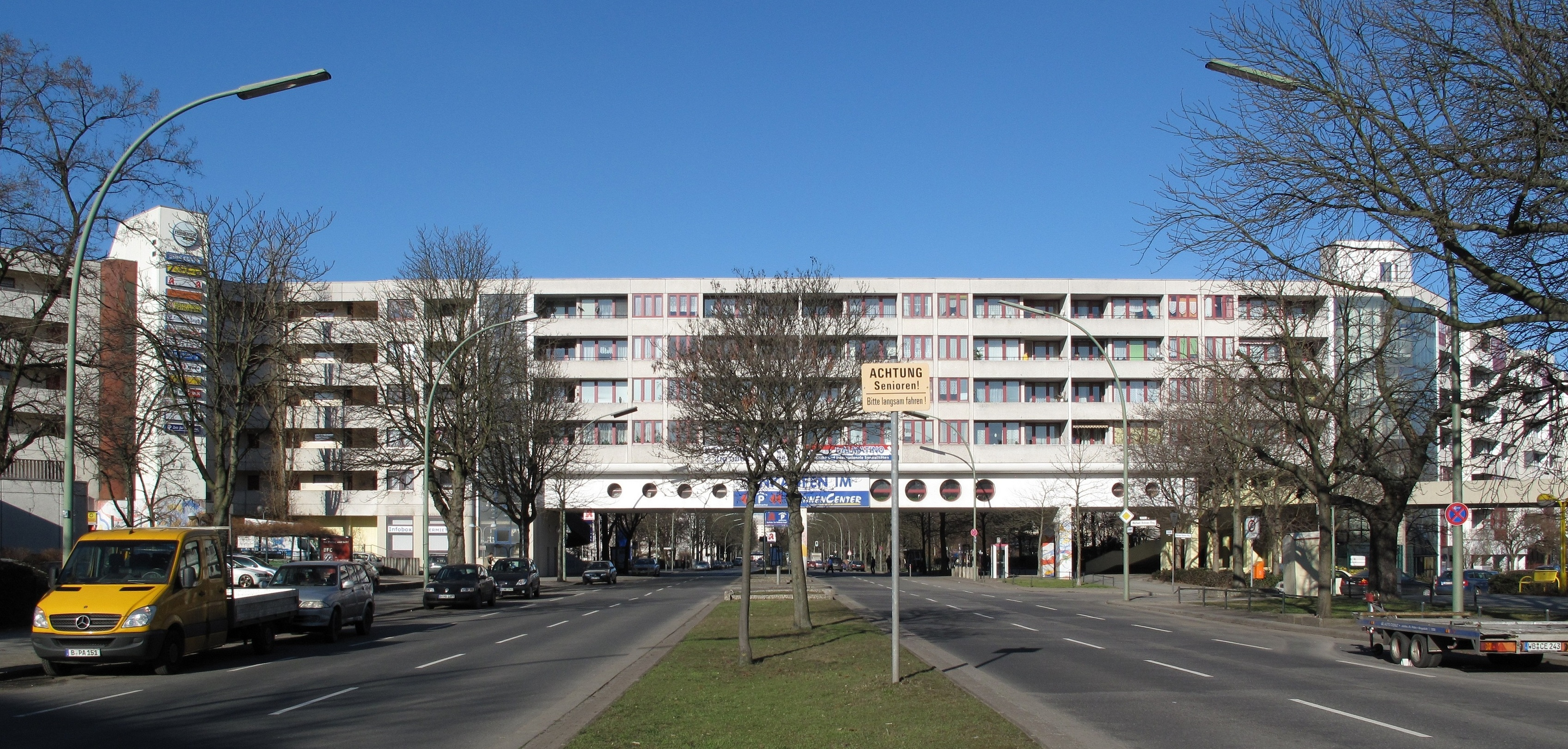
Bridge house over Sonnenallee, the estate's entrance gate

=== Roads and transport links ===
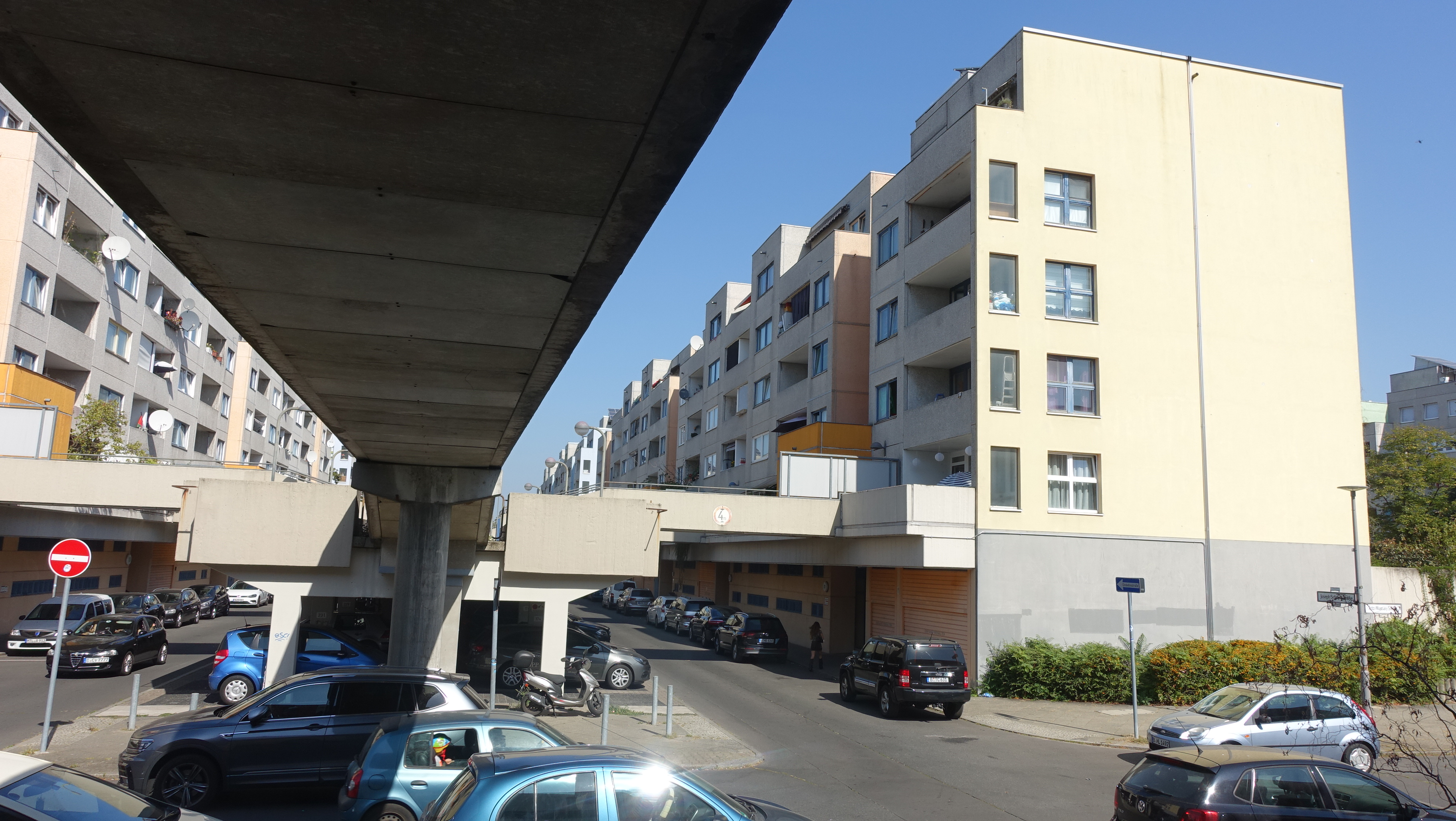
Under the decks, 2024

Six roads, named after opera and operetta stars, connect to Sonnenallee, divided by central parking zones into two-lane one-way streets:

- Michael Bohnen, Michael-Bohnen-Ring (streets 590, 592);
- Fritzi Massary, Fritzi-Massary-Straße (streets 597, 598);
- Heinrich Schlusnus, Heinrich-Schlusnus-Straße (street 593);
- Peter Anders, Peter-Anders-Straße (street 591);
- Joseph Schmidt, Joseph-Schmidt-Straße (street 596);
- Leo Slezak, Leo-Slezak-Straße (streets 594, 595);

The estate is well-integrated into Berlin's road and public transport networks. The A 100/A 113 motorways are accessible within 5–10 minutes via the Dreieck Neukölln or Späthstraße junctions.

=== Successor buildings, owners, and refurbishment ===
Additional buildings include an angled residential block by Erbbauverein Moabit, two four-storey blocks with maisonettes by Volker Theissen in 1981, a residential complex by Arwobau, and a 1984 retirement home on Heinrich-Schlusnus-Straße. In 1991, the estate expanded with a new building on Neuköllnische Allee. In 2007, 1,917 units and 24 commercial units were sold to Capricornus High-Deck Residential GmbH & Co KG, which commissioned High Deck Management GmbH for management. In 2013, Buwog acquired 1,916 units, later merging with Vonovia. In 2021, Howoge repurchased the estate under an agreement with Berlin to reclaim municipal flats.

== Criticism of the concept and settlement ==
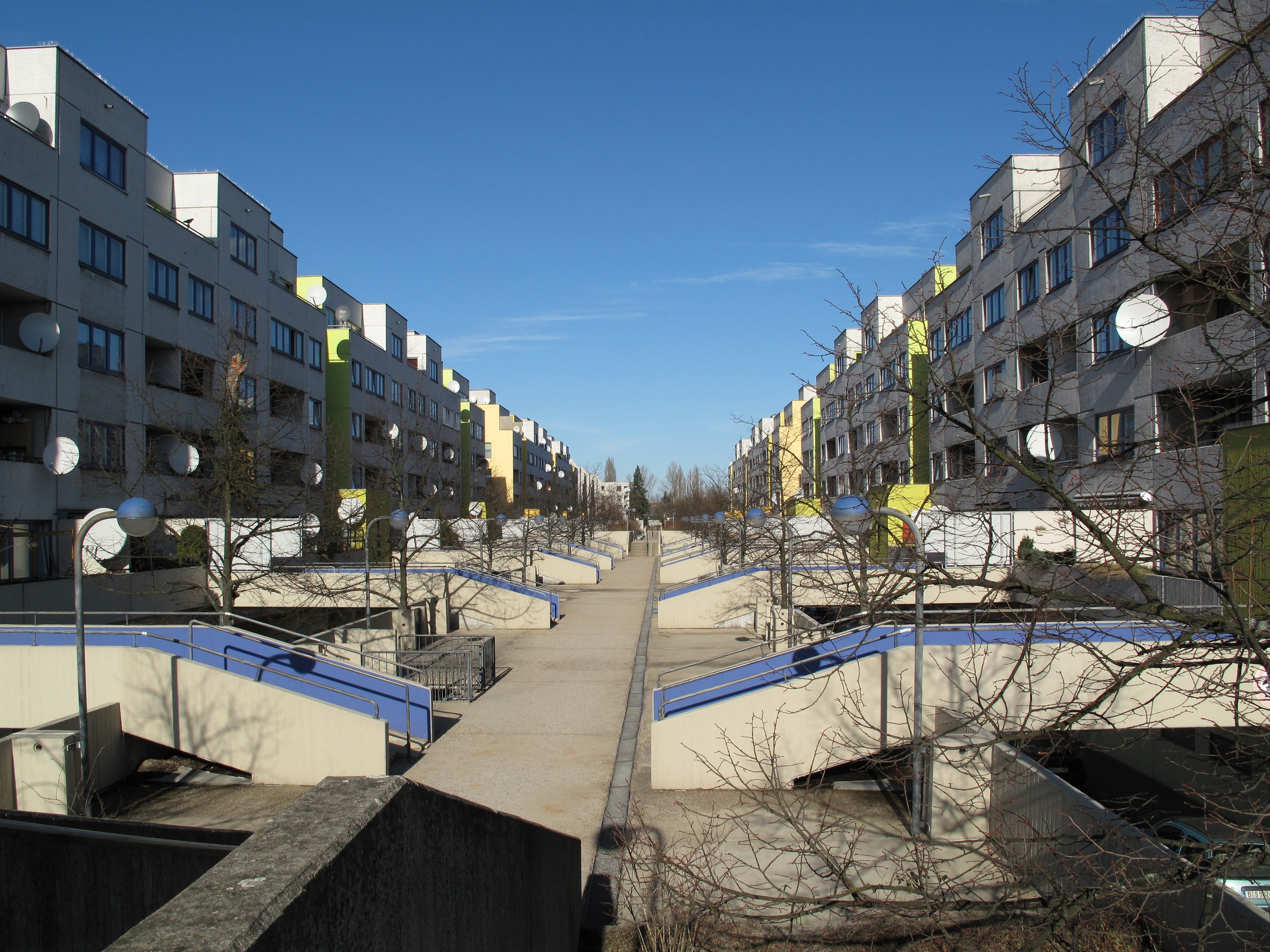
Deserted high deck, reduced to an elevated walkway

The High-Deck Estate's innovative concept was deemed a failure within 25 years. The separation of pedestrian and road areas failed to create a lively urban contact zone. The monotonous, car-dominated street levels inhibit neighbourly interaction, and the Sonnencenter's limited retail creates an insular character. Sonnenallee's barrier effect, exacerbated by few pedestrian crossings, divides the estate. The high decks, largely deserted, function only as elevated walkways, not as multifunctional spaces. The estate resembles a dormitory town, lacking urban integration and evoking a sense of placelessness.

== Sociographic data and development ==
Initially, the flats were highly sought after, attracting young working-class families from Kreuzberg and Neukölln. Waiting lists were common due to the estate's appeal as a peaceful, green residential area.

=== Population, fluctuation, and rent levels ===
In 1996, approximately 4,060 residents lived in the core buildings, increasing to 5,200 by 2005 and 6,117 by 2010, though neighbourhood management reported 4,883 in 2008. Tenant turnover is slightly below Neukölln and Berlin averages. By 2005, after subsidy changes, the basic rent was €4.34/m^{2}, with high heating costs raising a 75 m^{2} flat's total to €600. Post-2007 renovations reduced heating costs by up to 60% but increased rents by €0.68/m^{2}.

=== Social structure ===
In 1996, 22.9% of residents were under 19 (Berlin: 17.9%) and 15.8% over 65 (Berlin: 13.8%). In 1987, 17.4% had university entrance qualifications (Berlin: 37.8%), 5.1% had university degrees (Berlin: 10.4%), and 82.6% had secondary or intermediate school certificates (Berlin: 62.2%). Workers comprised 53% (Berlin: 40%). The foreign population grew from 5% at completion to 24% by 2005, with many German citizens of migrant background. In 1999, Turks comprised 15.2% of residents. By 2007, 51% of residents relied on transfer payments.

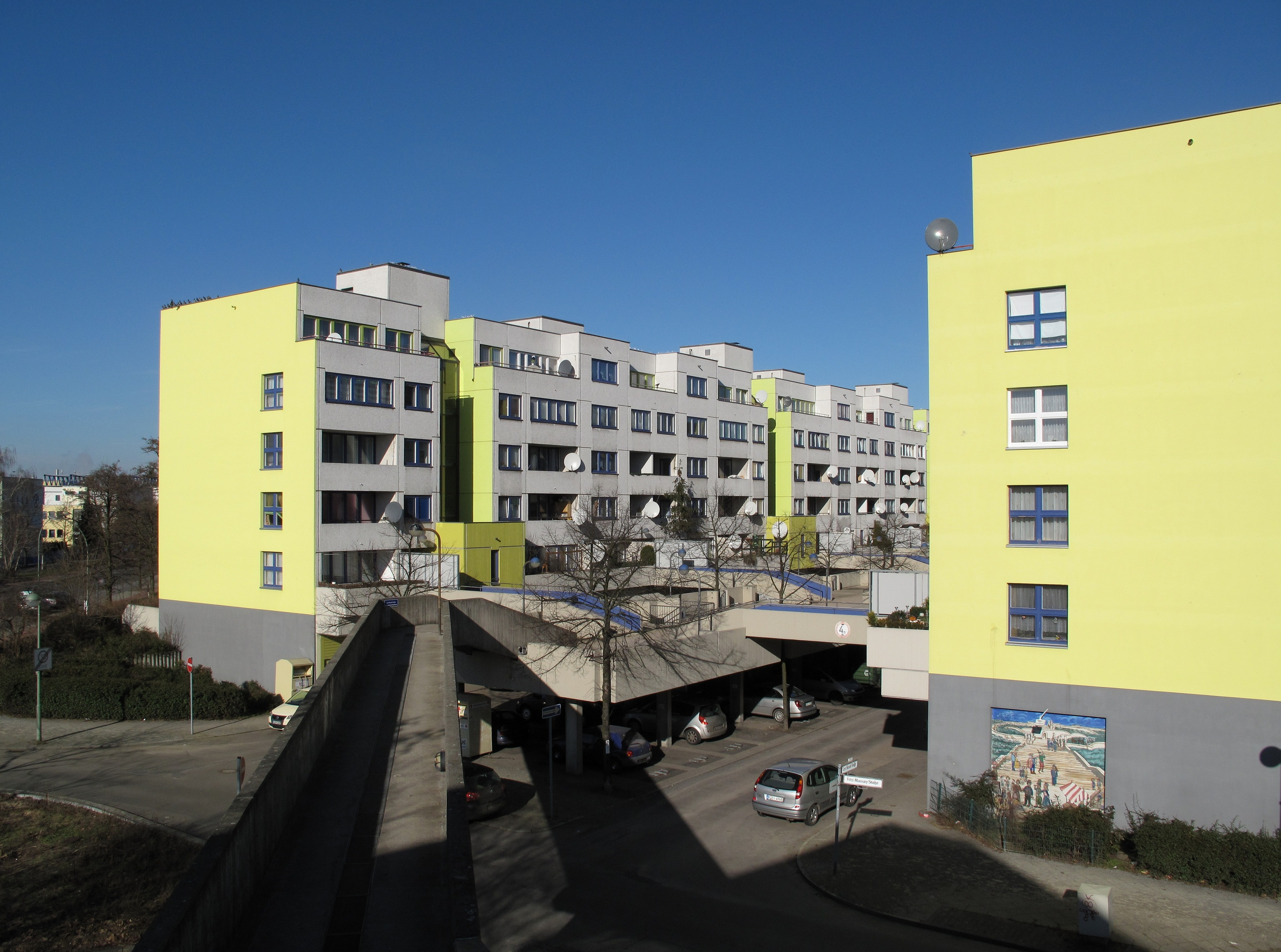
South deck of Leo-Slezak-Straße and connecting bridge to Neuköllnische Allee

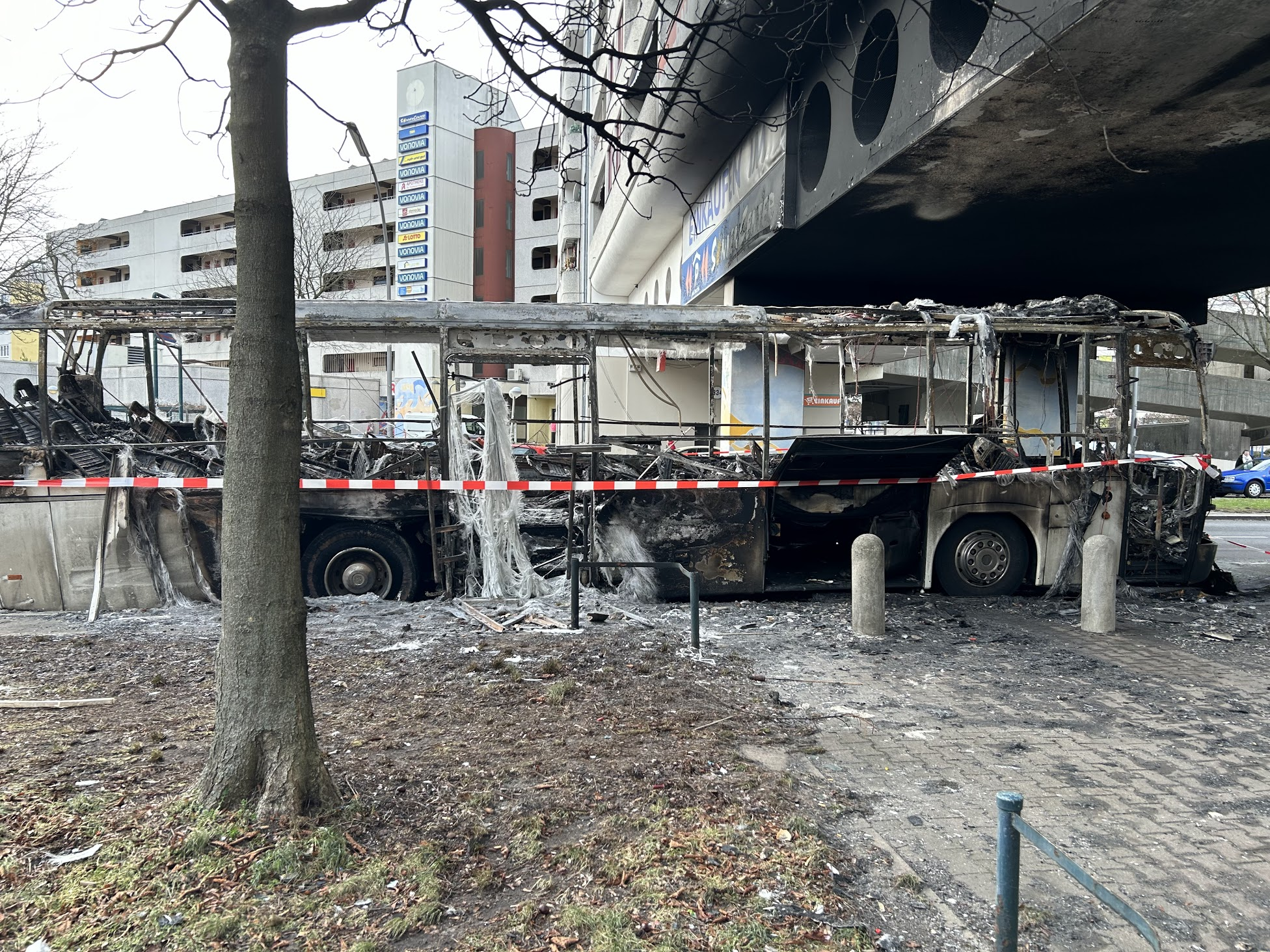
Burnt-out coach on New Year's Day after the 2022/23 riots

== Measures for upgrading ==
=== Neighbourhood management ===
In March 1999, Berlin established Quartiersmanagement (QM) to transform the High-Deck Estate into a sought-after, family-friendly area for diverse generations and cultures, investing €2.7 million by 2008. Goals include improving housing quality, social infrastructure, and job opportunities, fostering resident participation, integration, and education. Projects include a children's club, "Spielen im Kiez," a play bus, "Kleine Einsteine," a 40plus computer club, a sports club, and "Stadtteilmütter." The High-Deck-2012 project, opened in 2010, supports temporary employment and qualifications.

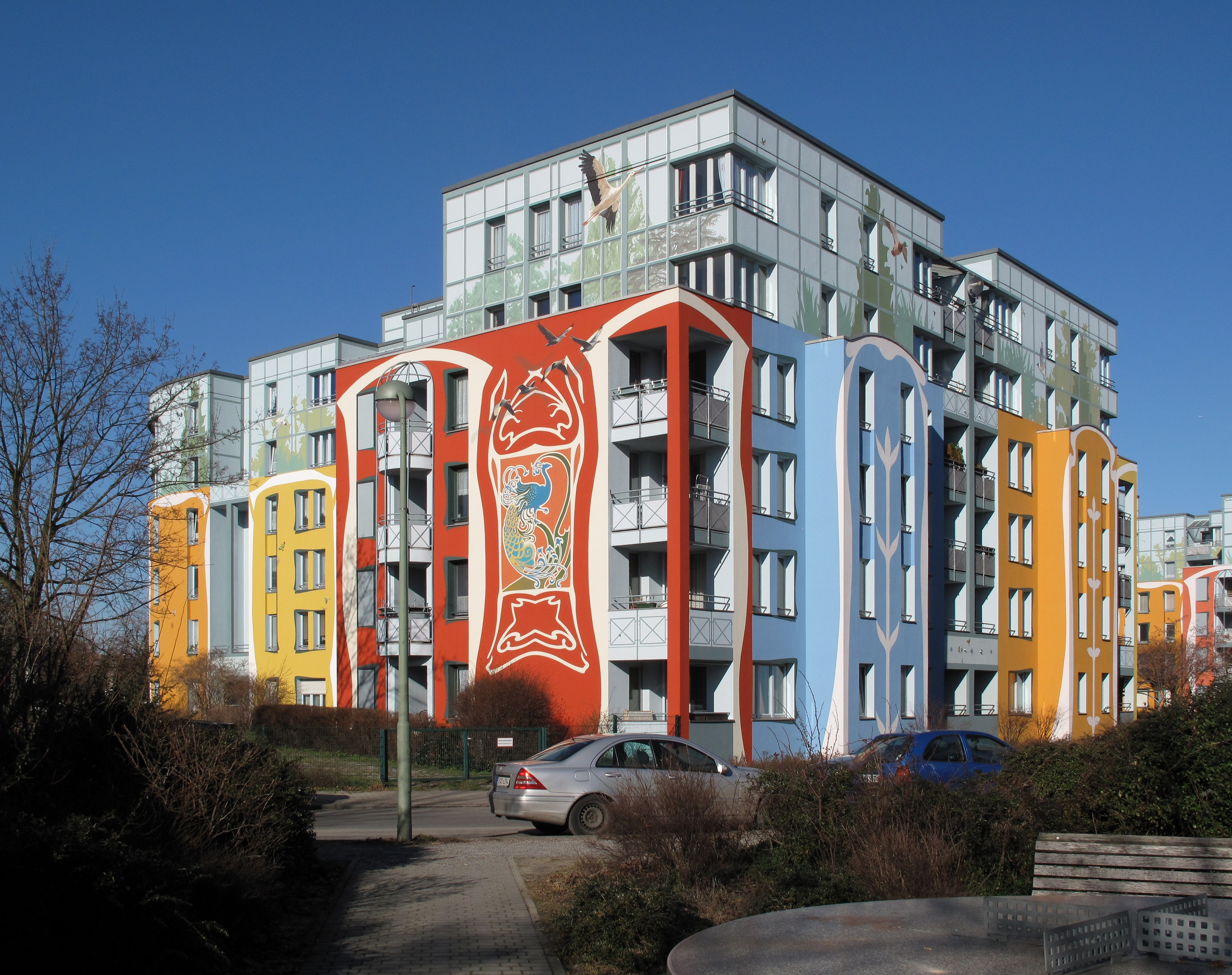
Aviary façade art by CitéCréation

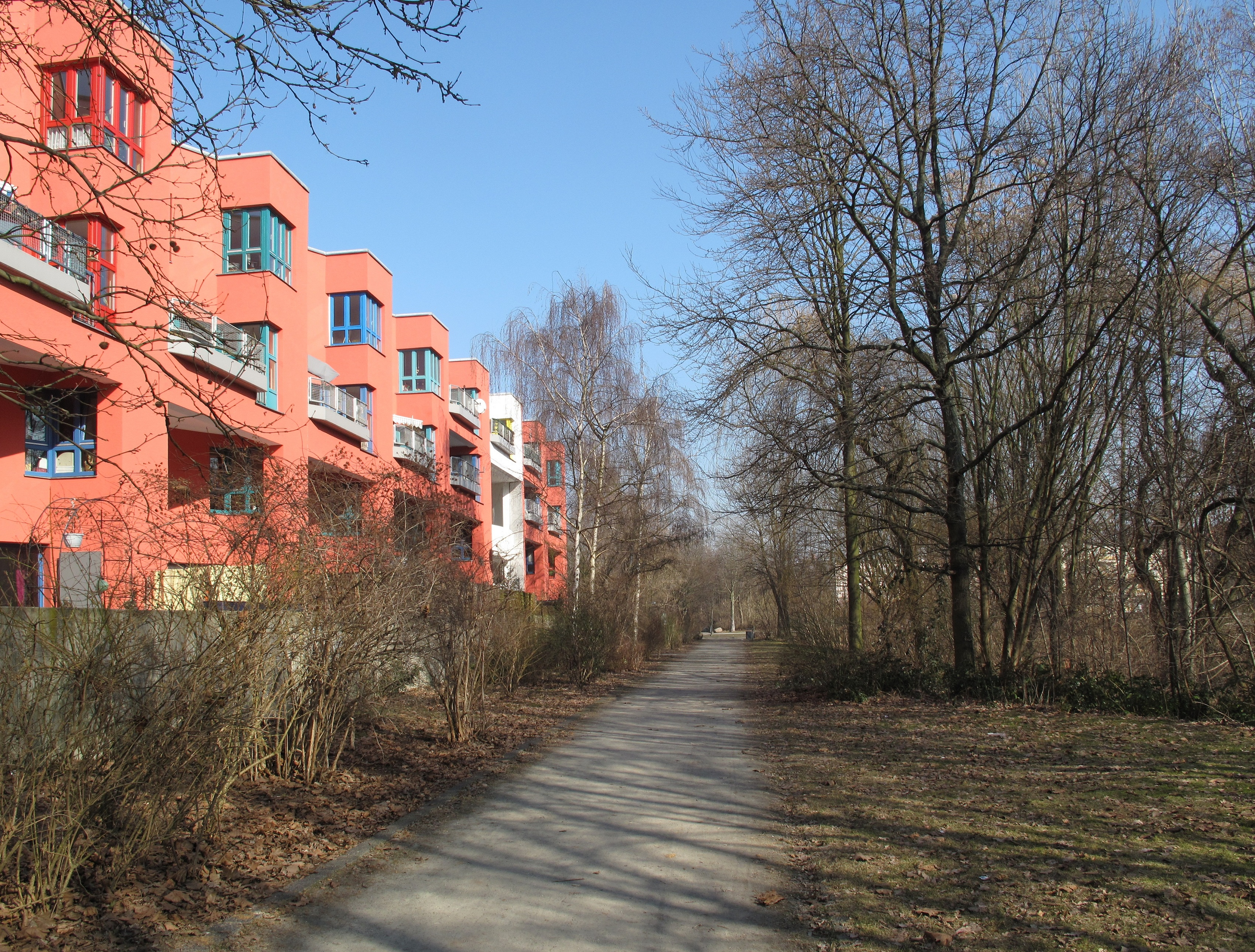
Apartment block on the Heidekampgraben green corridor

=== Heidekampgraben Qualification and Employment Initiative ===
In 2001, QM, Stattbau GmbH, and the Senate Department redesigned the Heidekampgraben green corridor, clearing vegetation and adding green spaces, benches, a playground, and a nature trail with input from local children. In 2005–2006, the Treptow side was renovated as part of the Berlin Wall Trail, costing €1.5 million.

== See also ==
- Wandbilder in Berlin

== Bibliography ==
- Haberle, Heiko (2013). "Highdeck Estate and Rollbergviertel – Two Housing Concepts of the 1970s". In Seidel, Matthias; Dame, Thorsten (eds.). weiterbauen 70. Berlin: Berlin University of the Arts, Faculty of Design, Architecture Program, Department of History, Theory and Criticism of Architecture. pp. 191–208. Archived from the original on 2012-06-26.
