= Der Revisor =

- comic opera by Werner Egk
- Librettist: Werner Egk
- Language: German
- Based on: The Government Inspector by Nikolai Gogol
- Premiere: 9 May 1957; Schwetzingen Festival

Der Revisor is a comic opera in five acts by Werner Egk, who was also the librettist. It is based on Nikolai Gogol's play The Government Inspector. The premiere on 9 May 1957 at the Schwetzingen Festival was conducted by the composer.

== Recording ==
- Der Revisor – Nasrawi, Galkin, Dries, Zink, Hauser, Perio, Augsburg PO, Bihlmaier, Oehms Classics
