= Circe (Egk) =

Opera by Werner Egk

- Opera by Werner Egk
- Librettist: Egk
- Language: German

Circe is a 1945 opera by Werner Egk after Pedro Calderón de la Barca, premiered 1948. Egk reworked it as an opera semibuffa as 17 Tage und 4 Minuten, 1966.
