= Boris Blacher =

German composer (1903–1975)

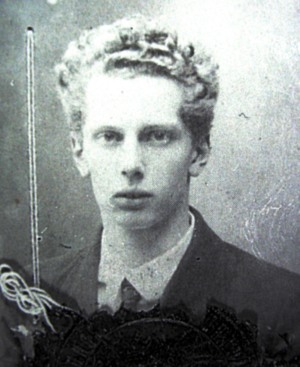
- Blacher, in a passport photo of 1922
- Born: 19 January 1903; Niuzhuang, Fengtian, Qing Empire (now Yingkou, Liaoning, China)
- Died: 30 January 1975 (aged 72); East Berlin, East Germany (now Germany)
- Occupations: Composer and librettist

Boris Blacher (19 January [O.S. 6 January] 1903 – 30 January 1975) was a German composer and librettist.

== Life ==
Blacher was born when his parents (of German-Estonian and Russian backgrounds) were living within a Russian-speaking community in the Manchurian town of Niuzhuang (Chinese: 牛庄镇) (hence the use of the Julian calendar on his birth record). He spent his first years in China and in the Asian parts of Russia, and in 1919, he eventually came to live in Harbin.

In 1922 he went to Berlin where he began to study first architecture, mathematics, and then music at the Berlin Hochschule fuer Musik. He found work arranging popular and film music.

Two years later, he turned to music and studied composition with Friedrich Koch.

His career was interrupted by National Socialism. He was accused of writing degenerate music and lost his teaching post at the Dresden Conservatory.

His career resumed after 1945, and he later became president of the Academy of Arts, Berlin, and is today regarded as one of the most influential music figures of his time. His students include Aribert Reimann, Isang Yun, Maki Ishii, Fritz Geißler, Giselher Klebe, Heimo Erbse, Richard Aaker Trythall, Klaus Huber, Francis Burt, Gottfried von Einem, Kalevi Aho and Richard Wernick. See: List of music students by teacher: A to B#Boris Blacher.

Blacher was married to the pianist Gerty Blacher-Herzog. They had four children including the German actress Tatjana Blacher and the international violinist Kolja Blacher. He died in Berlin in 1975, aged 72. He was buried in an Ehrengrab in the Waldfriedhof Zehlendorf, Berlin.

== Works ==
List of works:

- 1915-17: Visions fugitives, Op. 22 (arranged 1935)
- 1929: Habemeajaja, chamber opera, premiered 1987
- 1929: Jazz-Koloraturen, Op. 1 for coloratura soprano, alto saxophone and bassoon.
- 1930: String Quartet No. 1, Op. 11
- 1931: String Trio - Three Studies on Jewish folksongs
- 1931: Fünf Sinnsprüche Omars des Zeltmachers, Op. 3 for mezzo-soprano and piano
- 1931: Konzert-Ouvertüre
- 1931: Two Toccatas for piano
- 1932: Kleine Marschmusik, Op. 2 for orchestra
- 1933: Orchester-Capriccio über ein Volkslied, Op. 4 for orchestra
- 1934: Alla Marcia for orchestra
- 1935: Divertimento for string orchestra
- 1935: Etüde for string quartet
- 1935: Fest im Süden, Op. 6 Danse-drama in one act by Ellen Petz
- 1935: Fest im Süden - Suite for orchestra
- 1936: Divertimento for wind orchestra, Op. 7
- 1937: Concertante Musik, Op. 10 for orchestra
- 1938: Symphony, Op. 12
- 1938: Dance Scenes La Vie, ballet in one act
- 1938: Rondo for orchestra
- 1939: Harlekindae, Op. 13 ballet in one act with prologue and epilogue by Jens Keith
- 1940: Fürstin Tarakanowa (Princess Tarakanova), Op. 19 opera in three acts
- 1940: Fürstin Tarakanowa, Op. 19a - Suite for orchestra
- 1940: String Quartet No. 2, Op. 16
- 1940: Flute Sonata, Op. 15
- 1940: Concerto for String Orchestra, Op. 20
- 1940: Hamlet; Symphonic Poem, Op. 17 for orchestra
- 1940: Two Sonatinas, Op. 14 for piano
- 1940-41: Cello Sonata
- 1941: Violin Sonata, Op. 18
- 1942: Sonatina for Piano Four Hands
- 1942: Der Großinquisitor (The Grand Inquisitor), Op.21 - Oratorio after Dostoyevsky by Leo Borchard
- 1943: Three Pieces for piano, Op. 23
- 1943: Romeo und Julia, Op. 22 chamber opera, premiered Salzburg Festival 1950
- 1943: Drei Psalmen for baritone & piano (Psalms 142, 141 & 121). Arranged for chamber ensemble in 1966 by Beyer
- 1943: Piano Sonata No. 1, Op. 14/1
- 1943: Piano Sonata No. 2, Op. 14/2
- 1944: String Quartet No. 3, Op. 32
- 1944: Vier Chöre on texts by Francois Villon
- 1945: Partita for strings & 6 percussion, Op. 24a
- 1945: Concerto for Jazz Orchestra
- 1946: Chiarina, Op. 33 - ballet in one act by Paul Strecker
- 1946: Die Flut, Op. 24b radio opera
- 1946: Divertimento for trumpet, trombone and piano, Op. 31
- 1946: Die Flut (The Tide), Chamber opera in one act (text by Heinz von Cramer)
- 1947: Piano Concerto No. 1. Op. 28
- 1947: Orchestral Variations on a Theme by Paganini, Op.26
- 1947: Die Nachtschwalbe (The Night Swallow), Op. 27 Zeitoper in one act
- 1947: Four Songs, Op. 25 for soprano and piano. Text by Friedrich Wolf
- 1948: Violin Concerto, Op 29
- 1949: Hamlet, Op. 35 - ballet in a prologue and three scenes after Shakespeare by Tatjana Gsovsky
- 1949: Hamlet - Suite for orchestra
- 1949/52: Preußisches Märchen (A Prussian Fairytale) , ballet-opera in six scenes
- 1950: Ornamente, Sieben Studien über variable Metren", Op. 37 for piano
- 1950: Lysistrata, Op. 34 ballet in three scenes after Aristophanes
- 1950: Lysistrata - Suite, Op. 34a from ballet for orchestra
- 1950: Concerto for Clarinet, Bassoon, Horn, Trumpet and Harp, Op. 36.
- 1951: Piano Sonata No. 3, Op. 39
- 1951: Divertimento for four woodwinds, Op. 38
- 1951: Epitaph: In memory of Franz Kafka, (String Quartet No. 4), Op. 41
- 1951: Sonata for solo violin, Op. 40
- 1951: Dialog for flute, violin, piano and string orchestra
- 1951: Nebel, for voice and piano
- 1952: Piano Concerto No. 2 (in variable metres), Op. 42
- 1953: Orchester-Ornament, Op. 44
- 1953: Studie im Pianissimo, Op. 45 for orchestra
- 1953/57: Abstrakte Oper Nr. 1, Op. 43 experimental opera in one act
- 1954: Two Inventions, Op. 46 for orchestra
- 1954: Viola Concerto, Op. 48
- 1954: Francesca da Rimini, Op. 47 - fragment from Dante's Divina Commedia, for soprano and solo violin
- 1955: Der Mohr von Venedig, Op. 50 - ballet in 6 scenes and an epilogue after Shakespeare by Erika Hanka
- 1955: Träume vom Tod und vom Leben, Op. 49 - Cantata after a poem by Hans Arp for tenor, choir and orchestra
- 1956: Orchester-Fantasie, Op. 51
- 1956: Hommage à Mozart - Metamorphoses on a group of Mozart themes, for orchestra
- 1957: Music for Cleveland, Op. 53 for orchestra
- 1957: Two Poems, Op. 55 for jazz quartet
- 1957/64 Thirteen Ways of Looking at a Blackbird, Op. 54 for soprano and string quartet (or piano)
- 1958: Aprèslude, Op. 57 for voice and piano
- 1958: Songs of the Sea Pirate O'Rourke, Op. 56 for solo voices and orchestra
- 1958: Requiem, Op. 58
- 1959: Musica giocosa, Op. 59 for orchestra
- 1960: Rosamunde Floris, Op. 60 - opera (libretto by Gerhart von Westerman, based on the play by Georg Kaiser)
- 1961: Jüdische Chronik (A Jewish Chronicle), for chorus and orchestra
- 1961: Variations on a theme of Muzio Clementi, Op. 61 for piano and orchestra
- 1962: Five Negro Spirituals, for mezzo-soprano and ensemble
- 1962: Multiple Raumperperspektiven: piano and electronics
- 1963: Perpetuum Mobile for solo violin
- 1963: Konzertstück for wind quintet and strings
- 1963: Demeter, ballet in four scenes by Yvonne Georgi
- 1963: Demeter - Suite for orchestra
- 1963: Drei Chansons aus Shakespeare's Romeo und Juliet for voice and Piano.
- 1963: Fanfare for the Opening of the Philharmonie [Berlin]
- 1964: Cello Concerto, premiered by Siegfried Palm
- 1964: Zwischenfälle bei einer Notlandung (Incidents after a Crash-landing), electronic opera
- 1964: Skalen 2:3:4, electronic
- 1964/67: Four Studies for harpsichord
- 1965: Elektronische Impulse, electronic
- 1965: Octet for clarinet, bassoon, horn and strings
- 1965: Tristan, ballet in seven scenes by Tatjana Gsovsky
- 1966: Tristan - Suite for orchestra
- 1966: Virtuose Musik for solo violin, 10 winds, timpani, percussion and harp
- 1966: Plus Minus One for string quartet and jazz ensemble
- 1967: Spiel mit (mir), for 2 violins and recorder
- 1967: Ungereimtes, nach Kinderreimen komponiert for baritone/mezzo-soprano and piano
- 1967: String Quartet No. 5 Variationen über einen divergierenden c-moll-Dreiklang
- 1968: Ariadne, duodrama for two speakers and electronics
- 1968: Collage for orchestra
- 1969: Anacaona, six poems by Alfred Tennyson for mixed chorus a cappella about the Indian Queen Anacaona
- 1969: 200 000 Taler, opera after Sholem Aleichem's 1915 play "Dos groyse gevins"; premiered at the Deutsche Oper Berlin
- 1969: Vier Ornamente for violin and piano ad lib.
- 1970: Musik für Osaka, electronic
- 1970: Concerto for piccolo trumpet and string orchestra
- 1970: Piano Trio
- 1971: Clarinet Concerto
- 1972: Blues, Espagnola und Rumba philharmonica, for 12 solo cellos
- 1972: Stars and Strings, for jazz ensemble and strings
- 1972: Duo for flute and piano
- 1972: Sonata for two cellos and 11 instruments ad libitum
- 1973: Variationen über eine Tonleiter for solo violin
- 1973: Yvonne, Prinzessin von Burgund, opera in 4 acts. Libretto based on the play by Witold Gombrowicz
- 1973: For Seven = 3(6+x) for soprano and jazz ensemble
- 1973: Vokalisen for chorus a cappella
- 1973-74: Quintet for flute, oboe, violin, viola and cello
- 1974: 24 Preludes for Piano
- 1974: Poem for large orchestra (1974), dedicated to Tatjana Gsovsky
- 1974: Variationen über ein Thema von Tschaikowsky ("Rokoko-Variationen"), for cello and piano
- 1974: Pentagramm for 16 strings
- 1974: Poème for orchestra
- 1974: Prelude and Concert Aria for mezzo-soprano and orchestra
- 1975: Das Geheimnis des entwendeten Briefes (The Secret of the Stolen Letter), chamber opera
- 1975: Fragment for string quartet

Blacher wrote the libretto for Gottfried von Einem's operas Dantons Tod (1947) and Der Prozeß (1953).
