= Romeo und Julia (Blacher opera) =

1943 opera by Boris Blacher

Romeo und Julia is a 1943 opera by Boris Blacher.

== Recording ==
- In German: Hilde Güden, Richard Holm, Hermann Uhde, Sieglinde Wagner, Wiener Philharmoniker, Josef Krips 1950.
- In English: M. Tolaydo, N. Simpson, K. Wilson, L. Crawford, D. Robinson, I. Peterson, L. Vote, Chesapeake Chamber Orch., cond. Jeffrey Silberschlag 2008
