= Preußisches Märchen =

Preußisches Märchen (Prussian Legend) is a 1952 opera buffa with simultaneous ballet by Boris Blacher to a libretto by Heinz von Cramer based on the real life con-man Captain of Köpenick and Zuckmayer's play of the same title. The opera was the composer's first comic opera, premiered in West Berlin 23 September 1952.

== Recordings ==
- Lisa Otto (Vater Fadenkreutz), Ivan Sardi (Mutter Fadenkreutz), Manfred Röhrl (Wilhelm), Gerti Zeumer (Auguste), Donald Grobe (Assessor Birkhahn), Victor von Halem (Bürgermeister), 1974 Deutsche Oper Berlin Caspar Richter (conductor) & Winfried Bauernfeind (stage director) DVD
