= Kurt Böhme =

German opera singer

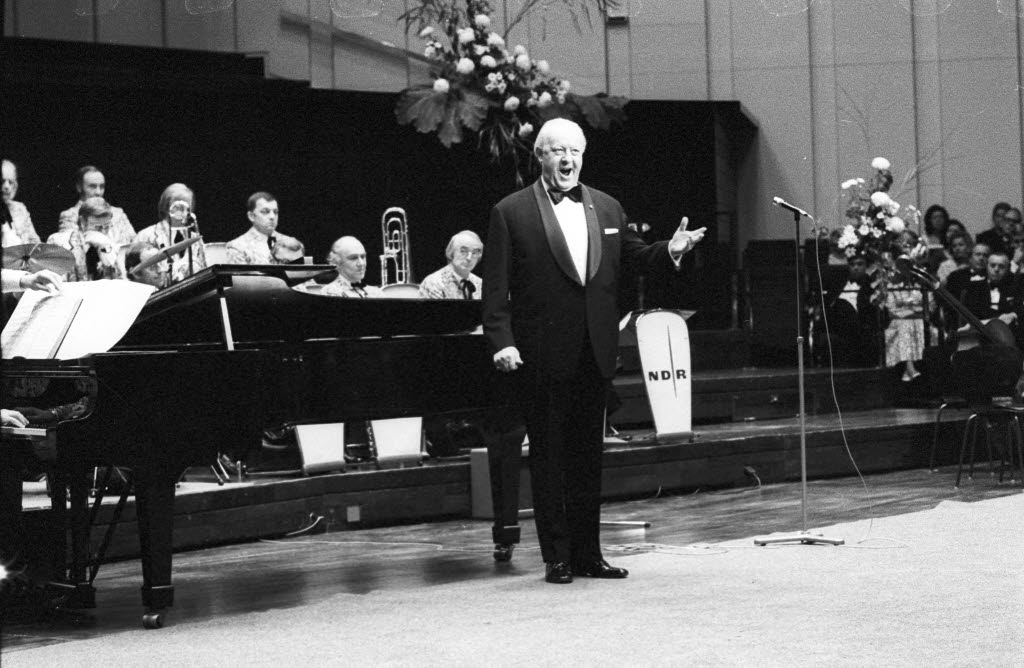
Kurt Böhme, 1974.

Kurt Böhme (5 May 1908 – 20 December 1989) was a German bass.

He was born in Dresden, Germany, where he studied with Adolf Kluge at the Dresden Conservatory. He made his debut in 1930 in Bautzen in Der Freischütz, singing both Kaspar (a signature role he was to perform roughly 350 times) and, following a 3-minute costume change, the Hermit. From 1930–1950, he was a member of the Dresden State Opera, 1949 he became a member of the Munich State Opera and in 1955 a member of the Vienna State Opera. In the 1950s and 1960s he became known worldwide because of his acting talents, performing the buffo role of Baron Ochs (more than 500 performances) as well as the 'heavies': Kaspar (1954 with Wilhelm Furtwängler), Fafner (1958–1964 with Georg Solti), and "Matteo" in Fra Diavolo (Dresden November 1944).

He was best known for his interpretations of Wagnerian roles, and Mozart's big bass roles (Osmin, Sarastro, and the Commendatore), and Baron Ochs von Lerchenau in Strauss' Der Rosenkavalier. His repertoire grew to 120 roles, including an impressive list of premieres that include Strauss' Arabella (1933) and Die schweigsame Frau (1935), Sutermeister's Romeo und Julia (1940) and Die Zauberinsel (1942), Werner Egk's Irische Legende (1955), Rolf Liebermann's Schule der Frauen (1957) und Isang Yun's Sim Tjon (1972).

He can be heard on numerous CDs, and seen on video in a speaking-only role (videotaped when he was 75 years old): the Third Priest in The Magic Flute (a performance from the Bayerischen Staatsoper, 1983, conducted by Wolfgang Sawallisch and featuring Lucia Popp, Francisco Araiza, and Kurt Moll). One of his earliest recorded performances, forty-two years earlier (1941), was in the role of the Speaker of the Temple of Wisdom in the same opera.
