= Columbus: Bericht und Bildnis =

Opera by Werner Egk

Columbus: Bericht und Bildnis, also known as Columbus, is an opera with both music and libretto by Werner Egk. Originally a radio opera that premiered in 1933, Egk revised it for the stage; a version which premiered in 1942. It was revised again by Egk for a second stage version which premiered in 1951. The opera takes place between the years 1486 and 1506 with scenes in Spain and the Americas. A biographical opera, it cover's Christopher Columbus's discoveries, conflicts, and death.

== History ==
Egk originally devised Columbus: Bericht und Bildnis in three parts. He conducted the opera for its premiere on Bavarian radio on July 13, 1933. The original version was also performed in a concert on April 4, 1934 at the TonHalle München. The Munich premiere was acclaimed in the press and joined the year's repertoire at the Freiburg Theatre, though some dissented. The lack of melody in the opera brought negative comment from Richard Strauss in comparison to Meyerbeer's grand opera on the life of the Portuguese explorer Vasco da Gama L'Africaine.

In 1941 Egk revised the opera for the stage, and it was given its premiere at the Städtische Bühnen Frankfurt on January 13, 1942 with a cast led by Clara Ebers as Queen Isabella, Hellmut Schweebs as Columbus, Jakob Sabel as King Ferdinand, and Franz Konwitschny conducting. Egk revised the stage work again, and the premiere of this second stage version was given on May 17, 1951 at the Berlin State Opera.

== Recording ==
- Columbus - Ernst Gutstein, Fritz Wunderlich, Hans Herbert Fiedler, Willy Ferenz, Georg Pappas, Chor des Bayerischen Rundfunks, Bavarian Radio Symphony Orchestra, Werner Egk
