= Werner Egk =

German composer

Werner Egk (German pronunciation: [ˈɛk], 17 May 1901 – 10 July 1983), born Werner Joseph Mayer, was a German composer.

== Early career ==
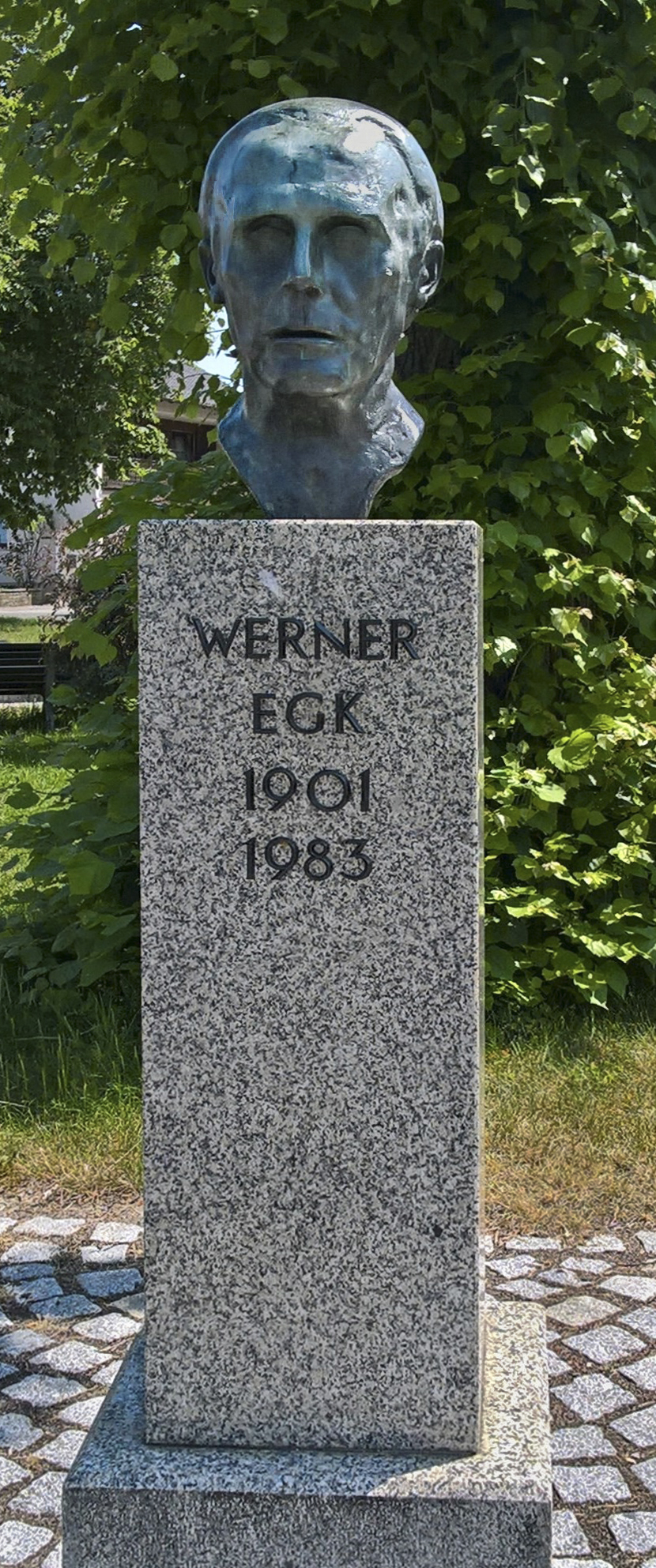
Egk memorial, Auchsesheim

He was born in the Swabian town of Auchsesheim, today part of Donauwörth, Germany. His family, of Catholic peasant stock, moved to Augsburg when Egk was six. He studied at a Benedictine Gymnasium (academic high school) and entered the municipal conservatory. Egk demonstrated talents as a composer, graphic artist, and writer, and he moved first to Frankfurt to improve his piano talents and then, in 1921, to Munich. There, working as a theater composer and playing in the pit, he married Elizabeth Karl, a violinist. He derived his pen name "Egk" from his wife's initials: Elisabeth, geborne Karl (Elisabeth, née Karl). His only son, Titus, was born in 1924.

Egk moved to Berlin in 1928, meeting composers Arnold Schoenberg and Hanns Eisler. He intended to become a cinema composer and accompanied silent films. When radio broadcasting became available to the public, Egk immediately realised its importance as a mass medium and developed operas and radio plays. He was introduced to Hans Fleisch, an important radio executive (also Paul Hindemith's brother-in-law and a Jew), by composer Kurt Weill. He received his first commission for broadcasting from Fleisch's company.

He returned to Munich in 1929 to work for the local radio station and settled in Lochham, a suburb. He became associated with musicians Fritz Büchtger, Karl Marx, and especially, Carl Orff, whom he had met in 1921. His music of the period shows a debt to the compositional style of Igor Stravinsky. He also became friends with new-music conductor Hermann Scherchen and the owners of the music publisher, Schott Music in Mainz. His career as a composer took off with the premiere of his radio opera, Columbus: Bericht und Bildnis, in July 1933 (staged in April 1934).

== Nazi era ==
Any composer working in Germany at the time had to deal with the Nazi regime coming to power in 1933. Michael H. Kater, professor of German studies at York University labels Egk "The Enigmatic Opportunist" in his portrait of Composers of the Nazi Era, and by far the most extensive evaluation of the composer's wartime connections in English. As a German of Catholic heritage, Egk was in no danger of falling into disfavor with the regime's racial policies; rather, the professional hardships for Jewish composers and others created opportunities for him. Egk's contact with Scherchen soon lapsed, and the composer developed a complicated relationship as well as a professional rivalry with Orff, whose works ultimately found more lasting success.

Initially, Munich's cultural administrators had doubts about the compatibility of Egk's Stravinskian style with a Nazi audience, and he encountered difficulty with Munich's representative for Alfred Rosenberg's Kampfbund für deutsche Kultur (Militant League for German Culture), Paul Ehlers.

In 1935, he premiered his first opera Die Zaubergeige (The Magic Violin) in Frankfurt am Main. The work channeled Bavarian folksong and a diatonic idiom far less modernist than his earlier, more angular Columbus: Bericht und Bildnis. This opera therefore matched Nazi artistic guidelines prescribing folk elements as being close to the people. Swiss composer Heinrich Sutermeister saw the stylistic change as "opportunistic." The success of the work led to a commission for ballet music related to the 1936 Summer Olympics (for which he received a gold medal in the Art Competition) and his appointment as conductor of the Berlin State Opera – a position he held until 1941. Egk's protector in Berlin was Heinz Tietjen, director of the Prussian state theaters and artistic director of the Bayreuth Festival.

November 1938 saw the première of his opera Peer Gynt based on Henrik Ibsen's play. Propaganda minister Joseph Goebbels wrote in his diary on 1 February 1939: "I am very enthusiastic and so is the Führer. A new discovery for the both of us". Oddly enough, Egk had returned to his more Stravinskian style in the work. More conservative critics found elements in the plot threatening to Nazi ideals of martial grandeur, and they also had difficulties with the reworking of the Nordic plot. One possible interpretation of the event lies in an argument Hitler had with his lieutenant Göring, who had warned Hitler not to go to the opera, "because none of your favorite singers were in it." It has been credibly suggested that Hitler and Goebbels decided to "like" the opera as a "taunt" to Göring for having the audacity to tell Hitler what he could and could not see.

As the thirties wore on, Egk was asked, or perhaps commanded, to make official pronouncements about German music, and he received a large commission (never fulfilled) for a large scale opera on Nazi themes. His next major work was the ballet Joan von Zarissa in 1940. In the following decade, it was common to pair the work with Orff's Carmina Burana. In general, Egk's music found much more success in Berlin, and Orff lost to Egk in the prize surrounding the Olympic games composition. Unlike Egk, who enjoyed regular income from his artistic directorship, Orff was also self-employed and much impoverished. This exposed Egk to attack from Orff's partisans, though Egk and his wife continued to see Orff socially. These rivalries impinged on the credibility of witnesses in Egk's trial after the war. From 1941 to 1945 Egk was the leader of the Composer division ("Leiter der Fachschaft Komponisten") in the State-Approved Society for the Exploitation of Musical Performing Rights (German: Staatlich genehmigte Gesellschaft zur Verwertung musikalischer Aufführungsrechte; STAGMA) which was then under the control of the Nazi Reichsmusikkammer (Reich Music Chamber).

Egk never joined the Nazi party and was exonerated in denazification tribunals held in 1947, but the trials were fraught with inaccuracies, including accounts of involvement with the Austrian resistance movement that were highly dubious. Among Egk's defenders were Gottfried von Einem and composer Boris Blacher. Initially his Nazi affiliations were held against him, though only briefly. There are various interpretations regarding the extent of his collaboration:

- Egk was never a Nazi, or
- Egk was never interested in unfair advantage for himself, or
- Egk was barely tolerated by the regime; or,
- Egk was an official musician of the Third Reich, who identified himself and his music with the ideals of the Nazis.

According to historian Michael Hans Kater, the truth is probably somewhere in the middle.

== Post-war ==
His major career began after the war. In Germany, Egk has been dubbed "Komponist des Wiederaufbaus" ("composer of the reconstruction", which followed World War II). Besides being a conductor and composer, he was head of the Berlin Musikhochschule (1950–1952) and important figure of the GEMA since 1950; he was also the first German president of the Confédération Internationale des Sociétés d'Auteurs et Compositeurs (CISAC). In 1954 he became conductor of the Bavarian State Opera with a 20-year contract.

His later years saw a constant string of premieres at major European festivals, beginning with Irische Legende in 1955, conducted by George Szell and featuring Dietrich Fischer-Dieskau. His opera Die Verlobung in San Domingo opened the National Theatre Munich in 1963 and features a libretto by Heinrich von Kleist, pleading for racial tolerance. His late works, however, were almost exclusively instrumental. Exceptional among them are works for winds, including the Divertissement for Ten Wind Instruments (1974) and the Five Pieces for Wind Quintet (1975).

Egk died on 10 July 1983 in Inning am Ammersee and is buried in Donauwörth.

== Selected works ==
=== Operas ===
- Columbus: Bericht und Bildnis. Radio Opera (1933) Revised (1942)
- Die Zaubergeige (after Count Franz Pocci, libretto by Ludwig Strecker) (1935; Revised 1954)
- Peer Gynt after Henrik Ibsen (1938)
- Circe (opera) after Pedro Calderón de la Barca (1945, Premiered 1948; Reworked as an Opera semibuffa as 17 Tage und 4 Minuten, 1966)
- Irische Legende after W. B. Yeats (1955; Revised 1975)
- Der Revisor after Nikolai Gogol (1957)
- Die Verlobung in San Domingo after Heinrich von Kleist (1963)

=== Ballets ===
- Joan von Zarissa for narrator, mixed chorus, soprano, baritone, and orchestra (1940)
  - two suites for orchestra, the second titled Triptych.
  - 3 chansons (Charles d'Orléans) for 10-part chorus
- Abraxas. Faust-ballet after Heinrich Heine (1948)
  - Concert suite
- Die chinesische Nachtigall after Hans Christian Andersen (1953)
  - Suite Divertissement for string orchestra
- Casanova in London (1969; Extracts as Englische Suite)

=== Orchestral works ===
- Kleine Symphonie (1926)
- Olympische Festmusik (1936; text from Carl Diem)
- Orchester-Sonate (1947/48)
- Französische Suite after Jean-Philippe Rameau (1949; reworked as a ballet 1952)
- Allegria (1952; Ballet 1953)
- Variationen über ein karibisches Thema (1959; Ballet Danza, 1960)
- 2. Sonate für Orchester (1969)
- Spiegelzeit (1979)
- Musik für eine verschollene Romanze. Overture (1980)
- Der Revisor. Concert suite for trumpet and string orchestra (1981)
- Die Zaubergeige. Overture arranged for wind ensemble (1981)
- Canzona for cello and orchestra (1982)
- Nachtanz (Opus postumus, Premiered 1985)

=== Vocal works ===
- Herrgott noch ein Stück Brot Chorus SSTT (1923)
- Furchtlosigkeit und Wohlwollen. Oratorio for tenor, mixed chorus, and orchestra; (1931; Revised 1959)
- La tentation de Saint Antoine d’après des airs et des vers du 18e siècle for alto, string quartet, and string orchestra (1952; ballet version 1969)
- Nachgefühl. Cantata for soprano and orchestra after Klabund (1975)

=== Singspiels (musical plays) ===
- Die Löwe und die Maus. Singspiel for children (1931)
- Der Fuchs und der Rabe. Singspiel for children (1932)
- Die Historie vom Ritter Don Juan aus Barcelona. After an old folk play (1932)

=== Film music ===
- Der Herr vom andern Stern (Film by Heinz Rühmann, 1948)

=== Writings ===
- 1953: Abstrakte Oper Nr. 1 – (Libretto for a work by Boris Blacher)
- 1958: Das Zauberbett – Comedy
- 1960: Musik, Wort, Bild – Essays
- 1973: Die Zeit wartet nicht – Autobiography
- Various essays in Melos, Das Orchester, Neue Zeitschrift für Musik, Österreichische Musikalische Zeitung.
