= Così fan tutte discography =

This is a partial discography of Mozart's opera, Così fan tutte.

== Recordings ==
Year	Cast (Fiordiligi, Dorabella Despina, Ferrando Guglielmo, Alfonso)	Conductor, opera house and orchestra (stage director)	Label
1935	Ina Souez; Luise Helletsgruber; Irene Eisinger; Heddle Nash; Willi Domgraf-Fassbaender; John Brownlee	Fritz Busch; Glyndebourne Festival Opera orchestra and chorus	CD: Naxos Records; Cat: 8.110280-81
1949	Suzanne Danco; Giulietta Simionato; Marysa Morel; Libero de Luca; Marcello Cortis; Mariano Stabile	Karl Böhm; Choeurs et Orchestre de la Suisse Romande (live Geneva, 14 January)	CD: Walhall; Cat: WLCD 0067
1951	Sena Jurinac; Alice Howland; Isa Quensel; Richard Lewis; Marko Rothmüller; Sesto Bruscantini	Fritz Busch; Glyndebourne Festival Opera orchestra and chorus (live 5 July)	CD: Immortal Performances; Cat: IPCD 1004-2
	Clara Ebers; Annelies Kupper; Maria Madlen Madsen; Franz Fehringer; Karl Schmitt-Walter; Georg Stern	Kurt Schröder; Chorus and Orchestra of the Hessischer Rundfunk (sung in German)	CD: Walhall; Cat: WLCD 0203
1952	Eleanor Steber; Blanche Thebom; Roberta Peters; Richard Tucker; Frank Guarrera; Lorenzo Alvary	Fritz Stiedry; Metropolitan Opera orchestra and chorus (sung in English)	CD: Sony Classical; Cat: MH2K 60652
1953	Suzanne Danco; Ira Malaniuk; Edith Oravez; Rudolf Schock; Horst Günter; Benno Kusche	Hans Schmidt-Isserstedt; Chorus and Symphony Orchestra of the Nordwestdeutscher Rundfunk (sung in German)	CD: Walhall; Cat:WLCD 0033
1954	Elisabeth Schwarzkopf; Nan Merriman; Lisa Otto; Léopold Simoneau; Rolando Panerai; Sesto Bruscantini	Herbert von Karajan; Philharmonia Orchestra and Chorus	CD: EMI Classics; Cat: 3 33789 2 For details, see Così fan tutte (Herbert von Karajan recording)
	Irmgard Seefried; Dagmar Hermann; Lisa Otto; Anton Dermota; Erich Kunz; Paul Schöffler	Karl Böhm; Vienna Philharmonic; Vienna State Opera chorus (live Salzburg Festival, 2 August)	CD: Orfeo; Cat: 357 942
1955	Lisa Della Casa; Christa Ludwig; Emmy Loose; Anton Dermota; Erich Kunz; Paul Schöffler	Karl Böhm; Vienna State Opera orchestra and chorus	CD: Decca Records; Cat: 455 476-2
	Teresa Stich-Randall; Ira Malaniuk; Graziella Sciutti; Waldemar Kmentt; Walter Berry; Dezső Ernster	Rudolf Moralt; Vienna Symphony; Vienna State Opera chorus	CD: Philips Records; Cat: 438 678-2
	Eleanor Steber; Blanche Thebom; Patrice Munsel; Cesare Valletti; Frank Guarrera; Lorenzo Alvary	Fritz Stiedry; Metropolitan Opera orchestra and chorus (live 17 December) (sung in English)	DVD: Andromeda; Cat: ANDRCD 9020
1956	Elisabeth Schwarzkopf; Nan Merriman; Graziella Sciutti; Luigi Alva; Rolando Panerai; Franco Calabrese	Guido Cantelli; Milan Scala orchestra and chorus (live 27 January)	CD: Opera D'oro; Cat: OPD 1208
1957	Teresa Stich-Randall; Teresa Berganza; Mariella Adani; Luigi Alva; Rolando Panerai; Marcello Cortis	Hans Rosbaud; Choeurs et Orchestre des Concerts du Conservatoire de Paris (live Aix-en-Provence Festival, 26 July)	CD: INA; Cat: 262015
	Annelies Kupper; Hertha Töpper; Erika Köth; Rudolf Schock; Horst Günter; Walter Berry	Eugen Jochum; Bayerischer Rundfunk symphony orchestra and chorus	CD: Walhall; Cat: WLCD 0210
1962	Elisabeth Schwarzkopf; Christa Ludwig; Graziella Sciutti; Waldemar Kmentt; Hermann Prey; Karl Dönch	Karl Böhm; Vienna Philharmonic; Vienna State Opera chorus (live Salzburg Festival, 8 August)	CD: Gala; Cat: GL 100.503
	Elisabeth Schwarzkopf; Christa Ludwig; Hanny Steffek; Alfredo Kraus; Giuseppe Taddei; Walter Berry	Karl Böhm; Philharmonia Orchestra and Chorus	CD: EMI Classics; Cat: 5 67382 2
	Irmgard Seefried; Nan Merriman; Erika Köth; Ernst Haefliger; Hermann Prey; Dietrich Fischer-Dieskau	Eugen Jochum; Berliner Philharmoniker; RIAS Kammerchor	CD: Deutsche Grammophon; Cat: 477 5669
1967	Leontyne Price; Tatiana Troyanos; Judith Raskin; George Shirley; Sherrill Milnes; Ezio Flagello	Erich Leinsdorf; Philharmonia Orchestra; Ambrosian Singers	CD: RCA Red Seal; Cat: GD 86677-2 1969 Grammy Award for Best Opera Recording
	Teresa Stich-Randall; Janis Martin; Adriana Martino; Werner Krenn; Victor Braun; Carlos Feller	Peter Maag; RAI Rome orchestra and chorus	CD: Arts; Cat: 43035-2
1968	Gundula Janowitz; Christa Ludwig; Olivera Miljakovic; Adolf Dallapozza; Walter Berry; Eberhard Waechter	Josef Krips; Vienna State Opera orchestra and chorus (live 22 September)	CD: Orfeo; Cat: 697 072
1969	Celestina Casapietra; Annelies Burmeister; Sylvia Geszty; Peter Schreier; Günther Leib; Theo Adam	Otmar Suitner; Berlin State Opera orchestra and chorus	CD: Berlin Classics; Cat: 0032992 BC
	Elizabeth Harwood; Janet Baker; Carol Ann Curry; Kurt Westi; Peter van der Bilt; John Shirley-Quirk	Alexander Gibson; Scottish National Orchestra; Scottish Opera chorus (live Glasgow, 8 May) (sung in English)	CD: Ponto; Cat: 1052
1971	Margaret Price; Yvonne Minton; Lucia Popp; Luigi Alva; Geraint Evans; Hans Sotin	Otto Klemperer; New Philharmonia Orchestra; John Alldis Choir	CD: EMI Records; Cat: 7 63845 2
1972	Gundula Janowitz; Brigitte Fassbaender; Reri Grist; Peter Schreier; Hermann Prey; Dietrich Fischer-Dieskau	Karl Böhm; Vienna Philharmonic; Vienna State Opera chorus (live Salzburg Festival, 30 July)	CD: Foyer; Cat: CF2066
1973-4	Pilar Lorengar; Teresa Berganza; Jane Berbié; Ryland Davies; Tom Krause; Gabriel Bacquier	Georg Solti; London Philharmonic Orchestra; Royal Opera House chorus	CD: Decca Records; Cat: 473 354-2
1974	Montserrat Caballé; Janet Baker; Ileana Cotrubaș; Nicolai Gedda; Wladimiro Ganzarolli; Richard Van Allan	Colin Davis; Royal Opera House orchestra and chorus	CD: Philips Records; Cat: 422 542-2
	Gundula Janowitz; Brigitte Fassbaender; Reri Grist; Peter Schreier; Hermann Prey; Rolando Panerai	Karl Böhm; Vienna Philharmonic; Vienna State Opera chorus (live Salzburg Festival, 28 August)	CD: Deutsche Grammophon; Cat: 429 874-2
	Enriqueta Tarrés; Kari Lövaas; Rotraud Hansmann; Erik Geisen; Philippe Huttenlocher; Klaus Hirte	Pierre Colombo; Opéra de Monte-Carlo orchestra Paris Opéra chorus	LP: Concert Hall; Cat: SMS 2933-5
1977	Kiri Te Kanawa; Frederica von Stade; Teresa Stratas; David Rendall; Philippe Huttenlocher; Jules Bastin	Alain Lombard; Orchestre philharmonique de Strasbourg; Deutsche Oper am Rhein chorus	CD: Erato Records; Cat: For details, see Così fan tutte (Alain Lombard recording)
1978	Margaret Price; Brigitte Fassbaender; Reri Grist; Peter Schreier; Wolfgang Brendel; Theo Adam	Wolfgang Sawallisch; Bayerische Staatsoper orchestra and chorus (live 25 February)	CD: Orfeo; Cat: 918 182
1981	Kiri Te Kanawa; Agnes Baltsa; Daniela Mazzucato; Stuart Burrows; Thomas Allen; Richard Van Allan	Colin Davis; Royal Opera House orchestra and chorus (live 27 January)	CD: Opus Arte; Cat: OA CD9005 D
1982	Margaret Marshall; Agnes Baltsa; Kathleen Battle; Francisco Araiza; James Morris; José van Dam	Riccardo Muti; Vienna Philharmonic; Vienna State Opera chorus (live Salzburg Festival, 8/15/22 August)	CD: EMI; Cat: 7 69580 2
1983	Margaret Marshall; Ann Murray; Kathleen Battle; Francisco Araiza; James Morris; Sesto Bruscantini	Riccardo Muti; Vienna Philharmonic; Vienna State Opera chorus (live Salzburg Festival)	DVD: Arthaus; Cat: 109100
1984	Rachel Yakar; Alicia Nafé; Georgine Resick; Gösta Winbergh; Tom Krause; Carlos Feller	Arnold Östman; Drottingholm Court Theatre orchestra and chorus	CD: L'Oiseau-lyre; Cat: 414 316-2
1985	Verena Schweizer; Martina Borst; Julie Kaufmann; Deon van der Walt; Andreas Schmidt; Hans Georg Ahrens	Wolfgang Gönnenwein; Ludwigsburg Festival orchestra and chorus (sung in German)	CD: EMI Electrola; Cat: 747 530 8
1986	Carol Vaness; Delores Ziegler; Lillian Watson; John Aler; Dale Duesing; Claudio Desderi	Bernard Haitink; London Philharmonic Orchestra; Glyndebourne Festival chorus	CD: EMI; Cat: 7 47727 8
	G. Chornoba; Olga Teruchnova; Natalia Pustovaya; Oleg Biktimirov; Vladislav Verestnikov; Anatoly Babikin	Mark Ermler; Bolshoi Theatre orchestra and chorus (in Russian) (live)	LP: Melodiya; Cat: C10 28837 006
1988	Kiri Te Kanawa; Ann Murray; Marie McLaughlin; Hans Peter Blochwitz; Thomas Hampson; Ferruccio Furlanetto	James Levine; Vienna Philharmonic; Vienna State Opera chorus	CD: Deutsche Grammophon; Cat: 423 897-2
	Edita Gruberová; Delores Ziegler; Teresa Stratas; Luis Lima; Ferruccio Furlanetto; Paolo Montarsolo	Nikolaus Harnoncourt; Vienna Philharmonic; Vienna State Opera chorus	DVD: Deutsche Grammophon; Cat: 073 4237
	Ratibael El Hefni; Awatef El Sharqawi; Afaf Radi; Hassan Kami; Raouf Zaidan; Reda Al Wakil	Yousef El Sisi; Polish National Radio Symphony Orchestra; Silesian Chamber Music Chorus sung in Arabic	CD: Sadek; Cat: 1001
1988-9	Karita Mattila; Anne Sofie von Otter; Elżbieta Szmytka; Francisco Araiza; Thomas Allen; José van Dam	Neville Marriner; Academy of St Martin in the Fields orchestra and chorus	CD: Philips Records; Cat: 422 381-2
1989	Lella Cuberli; Cecilia Bartoli; Joan Rodgers; Kurt Streit; Ferruccio Furlanetto; John Tomlinson	Daniel Barenboim; Berliner Philharmoniker; RIAS Kammerchor	CD: Erato Records; Cat: 2292-45475-2
	Daniela Dessì; Delores Ziegler; Adelina Scarabelli; Jozef Kundlák; Alessandro Corbelli; Claudio Desderi	Riccardo Muti; Teatro alla Scala orchestra and chorus	DVD: Opus Arte; Cat: OA 3006
1990	Susan Larson; Janice Felty; Sue Ellen Kuzma; Frank Kelley; James Maddalena; Sanford Sylvan	Craig Smith; Vienna Symphony; Arnold Schönberg Chor	DVD: Decca; Cat: 071 4139
	Anna Caterina Antonacci; Monica Bacelli; Laura Cherici; Richard Decker; Albert Dohmen; Sesto Bruscantini	Gustav Kuhn; Orchestra Filarmonica Marchigiana; Coro Lirico Marchigiano "Vincenzo Bellini" (live 3 August)	CD: Orfeo; Cat: 243 913
	Joanna Borowska; Rohangiz Yachmi; Priti Coles; John Dickie; Andrea Martin; Peter Mikulás	Johannes Wildner; Cappella Istropolitana; Slovak Philharmonic chorus	CD: Naxos; Car: 8.66008-10
1991	Charlotte Margiono; Delores Ziegler; Anna Steiger; Deon van der Walt; Gilles Cachemaille; Thomas Hampson	Nikolaus Harnoncourt; Royal Concertgebouw Orchestra; Dutch National Opera chorus	CD: Teldec; Cat: 9031-71381-2
1992	Amanda Roocroft; Rosa Mannion; Eirian James; Rainer Trost; Rod Gilfry; Carlos Feller	John Eliot Gardiner; English Baroque Soloists; Monteverdi Choir	CD: Deutsche Grammophon Archiv Produktion; Cat: 437 829-2
	Amanda Roocroft; Rosa Mannion; Eirian James; Rainer Trost; Rod Gilfry; Claudio Nicolai	John Eliot Gardiner; English Baroque Soloists; Monteverdi Choir	DVD: Deutsche Grammophon Archiv Produktion; Cat: 073 026-9
	Soile Isokoski; Monica Groop; Nancy Argenta; Markus Schäfer; Per Vollestad; Huub Claessens	Sigiswald Kuijken; La Petite Bande orchestra and chorus (live Franz Liszt Conservatory, Budapest, 7 October)	CD: Accent Records; Cat: ACC9296/98D
1993	Felicity Lott; Marie McLaughlin; Nuccia Focile; Jerry Hadley; Alessandro Corbelli; Gilles Cachemaille	Charles Mackerras; Scottish Chamber Orchestra; Edinburgh Festival Chorus	CD: Telarc; Cat: CD-80360
1994	Renée Fleming; Anne Sofie von Otter; Adelina Scarabelli; Frank Lopardo; Olaf Bär; Michele Pertusi	Georg Solti; Chamber Orchestra of Europe; London Voices	CD: Decca Records; Cat: 444 174-2
1995	Hillevi Martinpelto; Alison Hagley; Ann Murray; Kurt Streit; Gerald Finley; Thomas Allen	Simon Rattle; Chorus and Orchestra of the Age of Enlightenment	CD: EMI Classics; Cat: 5 56170 2
1996	Barbara Frittoli; Angelika Kirchschlager; Monica Bacelli; Michael Schade; Bo Skovhus; Alessandro Corbelli	Riccardo Muti; Vienna State Opera orchestra and chorus	DVD: Medici Arts; Cat: 2072368
	Sophie Fournier; Laura Polverelli; Sophie Marin-Degor; Simon Edwards; Nicolas Rivenq; Patrick Donnelly	Jean-Claude Malgoire; La Grande Écurie et la Chambre du Roy	CD: Auvidis; Cat: Astrée E 8658
1999	Véronique Gens; Bernarda Fink; Graciela Oddone; Werner Güra; Marcel Boone; Pietro Spagnoli	René Jacobs; Concerto Köln; Dresdner Kammerchor	CD: Harmonia Mundi; Cat: HMC 95 1663/5
	Michèle Lagrange; Liliana Nikiteanu; Laura Cherici; Domenicho Ghegghi; Nicola Ulivieri; Marcos Fink	Alain Lombard; Orchestra della Svizzera Italiana; Coro della Svizzera Italiana	CD: Forlane; Cat: 316809
2000	Cecilia Bartoli; Liliana Nikiteanu; Agnes Baltsa; Roberto Saccà; Oliver Widmer; Carlos Chausson	Nikolaus Harnoncourt; Zurich Opera chorus and orchestra (Jürgen Flimm)	DVD: Arthaus Musik; Cat: 100 012
	Regina Schörg; Heidi Brunner; Brigid Steinberger; Jeffrey Francis; Martin Gantner; Kwangchul Youn	Bertrand de Billy; Radio-Symphonieorchester Wien; Wiener Konzertchor	CD: Arte Nova; Car: 74321 85716 2
2001	Dorothea Röschmann; Katharina Kammerloher; Daniela Bruera; Werner Güra; Hanno Müller-Brachmann; Roman Trekel	Daniel Barenboim; Berlin State Opera orchestra and chorus	DVD: TDK; Cat: DV-OPCFT
2005	Erin Wall; Elīna Garanča; Barbara Bonney; Shawn Mathey; Stéphane Degout; Ruggero Raimondi	Daniel Harding; Mahler Chamber Orchestra; Arnold Schönberg Chor	DVD: Virgin Classics; Cat: 344 7169
2006	Miah Persson; Anke Vondung; Ainhoa Garmendia; Topi Lehtipuu; Luca Pisaroni; Nicolas Rivenq	Iván Fischer; Orchestra of the Age of Enlightenment; Glyndebourne Festival Opera chorus (live 27 June/1 July) (Nicholas Hytner)	DVD: Opus Arte; Cat: OA 0970 D
	Ana María Martínez; Sophie Koch; Helen Donath; Shawn Mathey; Stéphane Degout; Thomas Allen	Manfred Honeck; Vienna Philharmonic; Vienna State Opera chorus	DVD: Decca; Car: 047 3165
	Sally Matthews; Maite Beaumont; Danielle de Niese; Norman Shankle; Luca Pisaroni; Gary Magee	Ingo Metzmacher; De Nederlandse Opera orchestra and chorus	DVD: Opus Arte; Car: OA 3020B D
2007	Janice Watson; Diana Montague; Lesley Garrett; Toby Spence; Christopher Maltman; Thomas Allen	Charles Mackerras; Chorus and Orchestra of the Age of Enlightenment (sung in English)	CD: Chandos; Cat: CHAN 3152
2009	Malin Hartelius; Anna Bonitatibus; Martina Janková; Javier Camarena; Ruben Drole; Oliver Widmer	Franz Welser-Möst; Zurich Opera orchestra and chorus	DVD: Arthaus; Cat: 101 495
	Maria Bengtsson; Jurgita Adamonytė; Rebecca Evans; Pavol Breslik; Stéphane Degout; Thomas Allen	Thomas Hengelbrock; Royal Opera House orchestra and chorus	DVD: Opus Arte; Cat: OA 01331 D
	Miah Persson; Isabel Leonard; Patricia Petibon; Topi Lehtipuu; Florian Boesch; Bo Skovhus	Ádám Fischer; Vienna Philharmonic; Vienna State Opera chorus (live Salzburg Festival)	DVD: Unitel; Cat: A04001516
2012	Miah Persson; Angela Brower; Mojca Erdmann; Rolando Villazón; Adam Plachetka; Alessandro Corbelli	Yannick Nézet-Séguin; Chamber Orchestra of Europe; Vocalensemble Rastatt	CD: Deutsche Grammophon; Cat: 479 0641
2013	Anett Fritsch; Paola Gardina; Kerstin Avemo; Juan Francisco Gatell; Andreas Wolf; William Shimell	Sylvain Cambreling; Teatro Real orchestra and chorus, Madrid (Michael Haneke)	DVD: C Major; Cat: 714508
	Malin Hartelius; Marie-Claude Chappuis; Martina Janková; Martin Mitterrutzner; Luca Pisaroni; Gerald Finley	Christoph Eschenbach; Vienna Philharmonic; Vienna State Opera chorus (live Salzburg Festival, August)	DVD: EuroArts; Cat: 2072748
	Simone Kermes; Malena Ernman; Anna Kasyan; Kenneth Tarver; Christopher Maltman; Konstantin Wolff	Teodor Currentzis; MusicAeterna	CD: Sony; Cat: 88765466162
2014	Mari Eriksmoen; Katija Dragojevic; Elisabeth Kulman; Mauro Peter; Andrè Schuen; Markus Werba	Nikolaus Harnoncourt; Concentus Musicus Wien; Arnold Schönberg Chor	DVD: Unitel; Cat: 804108
2016	Corinne Winters; Angela Brower; Sabina Puértolas; Daniel Behle; Alessio Arduini; Johannes Martin Kränzle	Semyon Bychkov; Royal Opera House orchestra and chorus	DVD: Opus Arte; Cat: OA 1260 D
2017	Jaquelyn Wagner; Michèle Losier; Ginger Coster-Jackson; Frédéric Antoun; Philippe Sly; Paulo Szot	Philippe Jordan; Paris Opéra orchestra and chorus	DVD: Arthaus; Cat: 109 338
2018	Nazan Fikret; Héloïse Mas; Hamida Kristoffersen; Alexander Sprague; Biagio Pizzuti; Francesco Vultaggio	Laurent Pillot; Royal Liverpool Philharmonic; European Opera Centre	CD: Rubicon; Cat: RCD1026
2020	Elsa Dreisig; Marianne Crebassa; Lea Desandre; Bogdan Volkov; Andrè Schuen; Johannes Martin Kränzle	Joana Mallwitz; Vienna Philharmonic; Vienna State Opera chorus (live, Salzburg Festival)	DVD: Erato; Cat:
2021	Valentina Nafornița; Vasilisa Berzhanskaya; Benedetta Torre; Mattia Olivieri; Matthew Swensen; Thomas Hampson	Zubin Mehta; Maggio Musicale Fiorentino orchestra and chorus (live 28 March)	DVD: Naxos; Cat:
