= The Marriage of Figaro discography =

Partial discography of Mozart's The Marriage of Figaro

This is a partial discography of complete performances of Wolfgang Amadeus Mozart's opera The Marriage of Figaro. This opera was first performed at the Burgtheater in Vienna on 1 May 1786.

== Recordings ==
Year	Figaro Susanna Count Almaviva Countess Almaviva Cherubino Marcellina Bartolo	Conductor, Opera house and orchestra	Label
1934-35	Willi Domgraf-Fassbaender; Audrey Mildmay; Roy Henderson; Aulikki Rautawaara; Luise Helletsgruber; Constance Willis; Norman Allin	Fritz Busch; Glyndebourne Festival orchestra and chorus	78 rpm: His Master's Voice CD: Naxos Historical; Cat: 8.110186-87
1942	Erich Kunz; Irma Beilke; Hans Hotter; Helena Braun; Gerda Sommerschuh; Res Fischer; Gustav Neidlinger	Clemens Krauss; Vienna Philharmonia Orchestra; From the 1942 Salzburg Festival, sung in German translation	CD: Music and Arts
1943	Ezio Pinza; Bidu Sayão; John Brownlee; Jarmila Novotná; Marita Farell	Paul Breisach; Metropolitan Opera Orchestra and Chorus (Recording of a performance at the MET, 17 April)	CD: Guild Immortal Performances; Cat: GHCD 2203/5
1951	Erich Kunz; Hilde Güden; Paul Schöffler; Elisabeth Grümmer; Anny Schlemm; Lilian Benningsen; Wilhelm Schirp	Ferenc Fricsay; Orchester und Chor des Nordwestdeutschen Rundfunks Köln (German version)	CD: Cantus Classics; Cat: CACD 5.00822 F
1953	Erich Kunz; Irmgard Seefried; Paul Schöffler; Elisabeth Schwarzkopf; Hilde Güden; Sieglinde Wagner	Wilhelm Furtwängler; Vienna Philharmonic (German version after Hermann Levi); Live, Salzburg Festival, August 7, 1953	CD: EMI; Cat: 66080-2
1955	Cesare Siepi; Hilde Güden; Alfred Poell; Lisa Della Casa; Suzanne Danco; Hilde Rössel-Majdan; Fernando Corena	Erich Kleiber; Vienna Philharmonic and Vienna State Opera Chorus	CD: Decca Legends Cat: 466 369-2; Membran Cat: 222932-370; For details, see Le nozze di Figaro (Erich Kleiber recording)
1955	Sesto Bruscantini; Graziella Sciutti; Franco Calabrese; Sena Jurinac; Risë Stevens; Monica Sinclair; Ian Wallace	Vittorio Gui; Glyndebourne Festival orchestra and chorus	CD: EMI; Cat: 367710-2
1955	Rolando Panerai; Rita Streich; Heinz Rehfuss; Teresa Stich-Randall; Pilar Lorengar	Hans Rosbaud; Orchestre de la Société des Concerts du Conservatoire and the Chorale Elisabeth Brasseur (Recording of a performance at the Aix-en-Provence Festival)	CD: Walhall "Eternity Series"; Cat: WLCD 0167
1956	Walter Berry, Rita Streich, Paul Schöffler, Sena Jurinac, Christa Ludwig	Karl Böhm; Vienna Symphony and Vienna State Opera Chorus	CD: Philips; Cat: 438670
1957	Erich Kunz, Irmgard Seefried, Dietrich Fischer-Dieskau, Elisabeth Schwarzkopf, Christa Ludwig	Karl Böhm; Vienna Philharmonic; Chor der Vienna State Opera; Live, Salzburg Festival, 30 July 1957	CD: Orfeo; Cat: C 296 923 D
1958	Giorgio Tozzi, Roberta Peters, George London, Lisa Della Casa, Rosalind Elias, Sandra Warfield, Fernando Corena	Erich Leinsdorf, Vienna State Opera Chorus and Orchestra	CD: Decca; Cat: 444602
1959	Giuseppe Taddei; Anna Moffo; Eberhard Waechter; Elisabeth Schwarzkopf; Fiorenza Cossotto; Dora Gatta; Ivo Vinco	Carlo Maria Giulini; Philharmonia Orchestra; Producer: Walter Legge (Studio recording from 1959, released in 1961)	CD: EMI; Cat: 358602-2; For details, see Le nozze di Figaro (Giulini 1959 recording)
1960	Renato Capecchi; Irmgard Seefried; Dietrich Fischer-Dieskau; Maria Stader; Hertha Töpper; Lilian Benningsen; Ivan Sardi	Ferenc Fricsay; Deutsches Symphonie-Orchester Berlin	CD: Deutsche Grammophon; Cat: 437 671-2
1963	Geraint Evans; Mirella Freni; Tito Gobbi; Ilva Ligabue; Teresa Berganza	Georg Solti; Orchestra and Chorus of the Royal Opera House, Covent Garden (Recording of a performance at Covent Garden, 11 June 1963)	CD or MP3, operadepot.com
1963	Geraint Evans; Graziella Sciutti; Dietrich Fischer-Dieskau; Hilde Güden; Evelyn Lear	Lorin Maazel; Orchestra and Chorus of the Vienna Philharmonic (Recording of a performance at the Salzburg Festival, July)	DVD: Video Artists International; Cat: VAI DVD 4519
1964	Walter Berry; Anneliese Rothenberger; Hermann Prey; Hilde Güden; Edith Mathis; Annelies Burmeister; Fritz Ollendorff	Otmar Suitner; Staatskapelle Dresden, chorus of Staatsoper Dresden (Recorded in German as Die Hochzeit des Figaro, 17 to 24 June 1964 in Lukaskirche, Dresden)	CD: EMI; Cat: 7 69928 2 (69928–69931); Re-released on Berlin Classics
1968	Hermann Prey; Edith Mathis; Dietrich Fischer-Dieskau; Gundula Janowitz; Tatiana Troyanos; Patricia Johnson; Peter Lagger	Karl Böhm; Orchestra and Chorus of the Deutsche Oper Berlin	CD: Deutsche Grammophon; Cat: 449 728-2
1971	Wladimiro Ganzarolli; Mirella Freni; Ingvar Wixell; Jessye Norman; Yvonne Minton; Maria Casula; Clifford Grant	Sir Colin Davis; BBC Symphony Orchestra & Chorus	CD: Philips; Cat: 475 6111 8
1976	Hermann Prey; Mirella Freni; Dietrich Fischer-Dieskau; Kiri Te Kanawa; Maria Ewing; Heather Begg; Paolo Montarsolo	Karl Böhm; Vienna Philharmonic; Film directed by Jean-Pierre Ponnelle	DVD: Deutsche Grammophon; Cat: DG 073 4034
1976	Geraint Evans; Judith Blegen; Dietrich Fischer-Dieskau; Heather Harper; Teresa Berganza; Birgit Finnilä	Daniel Barenboim; English Chamber Orchestra and the John Alldis Choir	CD: EMI; Cat: CMS 7 63646-2 (3 CDs); Cat: 7243 5 85520 2 7 (Abbrev. 2 CDs)
1979	José van Dam; Ileana Cotrubaș; Tom Krause; Anna Tomowa-Sintow; Frederica von Stade; Jane Berbié; Jules Bastin	Herbert von Karajan; Vienna Philharmonic and the Vienna State Opera chorus	CD: Decca; Cat: 421 125-2; For details, see Le nozze di Figaro (Herbert von Karajan recording)
1981	Samuel Ramey; Lucia Popp; Thomas Allen; Kiri Te Kanawa; Frederica von Stade; Jane Berbié; Kurt Moll	Georg Solti; London Philharmonic Orchestra and the London Opera Chorus	CD: Decca; Cat: 410 150-2; For details, see Le nozze di Figaro (Georg Solti recording)
1985	José van Dam; Barbara Hendricks; Ruggero Raimondi; Lucia Popp; Agnes Baltsa; Felicity Palmer; Robert Lloyd	Sir Neville Marriner; Academy of St Martin in the Fields and Ambrosian Opera Chorus	CD: Philips; Cat: 416 370-2
1987	Thomas Allen; Kathleen Battle; Jorma Hynninen; Margaret Price; Ann Murray; Mariana Nicolesco; Kurt Rydl	Riccardo Muti; Vienna Philharmonic	CD: EMI; Cat: 72864 2
1988	Sanford Sylvan, Jeanne Ommerle, James Maddalena, Jayne West, Susan Larson, Sue Ellen Kuzma, David Evitts	Craig Smith; Vienna Symphony, Arnold Schoenberg Choir directed by Peter Sellars, set in Trump Tower	DVD: Decca Records; Cat: B0004243 (2 discs)
1990	Ferruccio Furlanetto; Dawn Upshaw; Thomas Hampson; Kiri Te Kanawa; Anne Sofie von Otter; Tatiana Troyanos; Paul Plishka	James Levine; Metropolitan Opera Orchestra and Chorus	CD: Deutsche Grammophon; Cat: 477 5614
1990	John Tomlinson; Joan Rodgers; Andreas Schmidt; Lella Cuberli; Cecilia Bartoli	Daniel Barenboim; Berlin Philharmonic and RIAS Kammerchor	CD: Erato; Cat: 2292-45501-2
1993	Bryn Terfel; Alison Hagley; Rod Gilfry; Hillevi Martinpelto; Pamela Helen Stephen; Susan McCulloch; Carlos Feller	John Eliot Gardiner; English Baroque Soloists and Monteverdi Choir (Recorded during performances in the Théâtre du Châtelet, Paris)	DVD: Deutsche Grammophon; Cat: 073 018-9
1994	Anton Scharinger; Barbara Bonney; Thomas Hampson; Charlotte Margiono; Petra Lang; Ann Murray; Kurt Moll	Nikolaus Harnoncourt; Royal Concertgebouw Orchestra	CD: Warner Classics; Cat: 2564 68829-8 (2009 re-issue)
1994	Lucio Gallo; Sylvia McNair; Bo Skovhus; Cheryl Studer; Cecilia Bartoli; Anna Caterina Antonacci; Ildebrando D'Arcangelo	Claudio Abbado; Vienna Philharmonic	CD: Deutsche Grammophon; Cat: 445 903-2
2001	Lorenzo Regazzo; Patrizia Ciofi; Simon Keenlyside; Véronique Gens; Angelika Kirchschlager	René Jacobs; Concerto Köln and Théâtre des Champs-Élysées Choir	CD: Premiere Opera Ltd. Cat: CDNO 1552-3
2006	Erwin Schrott; Miah Persson; Gerald Finley; Dorothea Röschmann; Rinat Shaham; Graciela Araya; Jonathan Veira	Antonio Pappano; Orchestra of the Royal Opera House, Royal Opera Chorus; Stage director: David McVicar; recorded live 10, 13, and 17 February	Blu-ray: Opus Arte
2006	Ildebrando D'Arcangelo; Anna Netrebko; Bo Skovhus; Dorothea Röschmann; Christine Schäfer; Marie McLaughlin	Nikolaus Harnoncourt; Vienna Philharmonic and Konzertvereinigung Vienna State Opera; Director: Brian Large; recorded live at the 2006 Salzburg Festival	CD: Deutsche Grammophon; Cat: DG 477 6710 DVD: Deutsche Grammophon; Cat: DG 073 4245
2007	Erwin Schrott; Martina Janková; Michael Volle; Malin Hartelius; Judith Schmid	Franz Welser-Möst; Zurich Opera Orchestra and Chorus	DVD: EMI classics Cat: 2344819
2011	Teddy Tahu Rhodes; Taryn Fiebig; Peter Coleman-Wright; Rachelle Durkin; Sian Pendry; Jacqueline Dark	Patrick Summers; Opera Australia Orchestra and Chorus; Director: Neil Armfield	Blu-ray: Opera Australia; Cat: OPOZ56002BD
2012	Christian Van Horn; Fanie Antonelou; Simone Kermes; Andrei Bondarenko; Mary-Ellen Nesi; Maria Forsstrom	Teodor Currentzis; Perm Opera Orchestra and Chorus	CD: Sony Classical; Cat: 88883709262
2016	Adam Plachetka; Martina Janková; Luca Pisaroni; Anett Fritsch; Margarita Gritskova; Ann Murray	Dan Ettinger; Vienna Philharmonic; Konzertvereinigung Wiener Staatsopernchor; Director: Sven-Eric Bechtolf	Blu-ray: EuroArts; Cat: 8024272951; DVD: EuroArts; Cat: 8024272958
2016	Luca Pisaroni; Christiane Karg; Thomas Hampson; Sonya Yoncheva; Angela Brower; Anne Sofie von Otter	Yannick Nézet-Séguin; Chamber Orchestra of Europe; Vocalensemble Rastatt; Concert performance at Baden-Baden Summer Festival	CD: Deutsche Grammophon; Cat: 028947959458

== Films ==
The Marriage of Figaro has been filmed as opera several times.

- 1949 film, East German production with actors and dubbed singing voices, except for Willi Domgraf-Fassbaender as Figaro
- 1960 film, Australian TV film, sung in English
- 1976 film, directed by Jean-Pierre Ponnelle (see above)
