= Elfriede Trötschel =

German soprano (1913–1958)

- Born: 11 December 1913
- Died: 20 June 1958 (aged 44); Berlin, Germany
- Occupation: soprano singer
- Known for: opera roles, recitalist

Elfriede Trötschel (11 December 1913 – 20 June 1958) was a German operatic soprano; she was a versatile singer with a wide-ranging repertoire.

She studied in her native Dresden with Sophie Kuhnau-Bernard and Paul Schoffler. Conductor Karl Böhm discovered her, and she made her stage debut at the Staatsoper Dresden in 1933 at the age of 20. She continued performing there until 1950. She made her debut at the Berlin State Opera and the Vienna State Opera in 1951. She made guest appearances in Florence, Naples, and Lisbon, and appeared at the Glyndebourne Festival, as Susanna, in 1953, and at the Royal Opera House in London, as Zdenka in 1953.

Her repertory included such diverse roles as Agathe in Der Freischütz, Marenka in The Bartered Bride, Antonia in the Tales of Hoffmann, the title role in Rusalka, Violetta in La traviata, Cio-Cio-San in Madama Butterfly, Hanna in The Merry Widow, etc.

She was also an admired recitalist. Her career was cut short by her sudden death by cancer in Berlin at the age of 44 while still at the height of her power.

== Selected recordings ==
- Smetana - Die Verkaufte Braut - Elfriede Trötschel, Richard Holm, Georg Stern, Frithof Sentpaul, Martha Geister - Frankfurt Radio Chorus and Orchestra, Karl Elmendorff - Cantus Classic (1953)
- Dvořák - Rusalka - Elfriede Trötschel, Helmut Schindler, Lisa Otto, Gottlob Frick - Dresden Radio Chorus and Orchestra, Joseph Keilberth - Relief (1948)
- Mahler - Symphony No 4 - RIAS Sinfonieorchester Berlin, Otto Klemperer (1956)

== Sources ==
- Operissimo.com
