= Andrè Schuen =

Italian opera singer

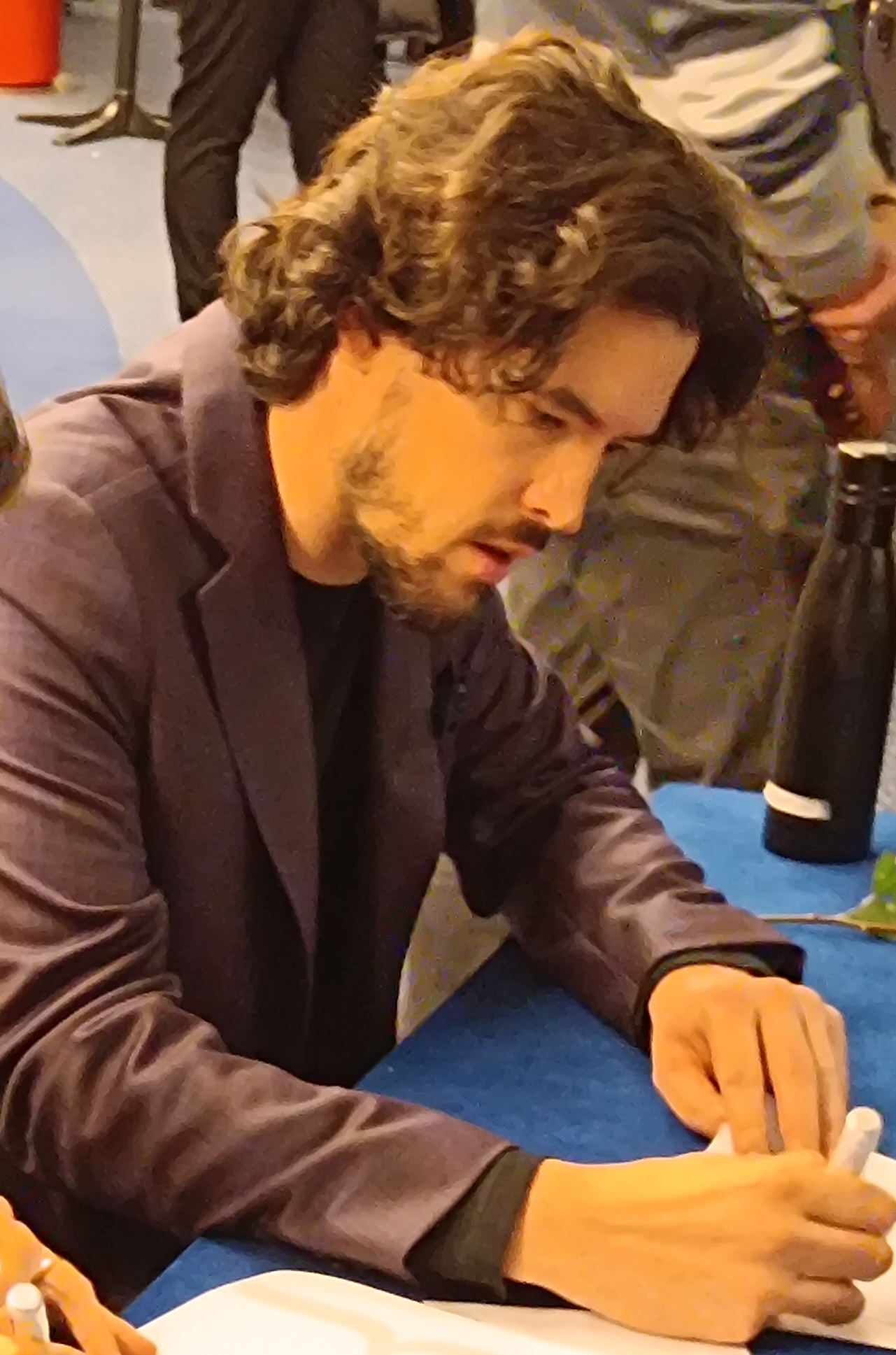
Schuen at the Oper Frankfurt 2023

Andrè Schuen (born 1984 in La Val, South Tyrol) is an Italian baritone in opera, concert and lied. After education at the Mozarteum University Salzburg, he has been an ensemble member of the Graz Opera.

== Life ==
=== Education ===
Andrè Schuen comes from a musical family of Ladin origins. His sisters Elisabeth and Marlene Schuen are members of the pop trio Ganes, which is closely linked to their local culture. He studied solo singing with Horiana Brănișteanu and lied and oratorio with Wolfgang Holzmair at the Mozarteum University Salzburg. He also attended a number of master classes, including with Sir Thomas Allen, Brigitte Fassbaender, Marjana Lipovsek and Olaf Bär. In 2009, Schuen was a prize winner at the Internationale Sommerakademie Mozarteum Salzburg and won first prize in the Walter and Charlotte Hamel Foundation singing competition. In 2010 he graduated with distinction and was awarded the Hanna Ludwig Prize and the Lilli Lehmann Medal.

=== Opera ===
Schuen appeared for the first time at the Salzburg Festival in 2006, he performed the role of the footman in Ariadne auf Naxos at the Haus für Mozart in January 2008 and finally appeared in the title role of Le nozze di Figaro at the Mozarteum. In 2009 he appeared at the Salzburg Festival in Al gran sole carico d'amore by Luigi Nono, and in 2010 he was accepted into the festival's Young Singers Project. At the Salzburg Easter Festival he took on smaller roles in Salome (2011) and Carmen (2012), both conducted by Sir Simon Rattle, at the Summer Festival 2011 he appeared in Macbeth, staged by Peter Stein and conducted by Riccardo Muti, performed and sang in concert in Stravinsky's Rossignol under Ivor Bolton.

From September 2010 to June 2014, Schuen was an ensemble member of the Graz Opera, where he was successful in the opera roles of Jeletzky, Masetto, Belcore, Ford, Heerrufer, and as Papageno.

In the 2011/12 season he appeared as Don Alvaro in Rossini's Il viaggio a Reims at the Flemish Opera in Antwerp and Ghent. Schuen sang the title role in Don Giovanni at the Opéra National de Montpellier in June 2013 and Guglielmo in Così fan tutte in December of the same year. In 2015 he made his debut as Ping in Puccini's Turandot at the Bregenz Festival.

From the 2015/16 to 2017/18 season, Schuen was an artist in the "Junge Wilde" series at the Konzerthaus Dortmund.

In 2023, Schuen appeared as Wolfram in Wagner's Tannhäuser at Berlin State Opera and as Count Almaviva in Mozart's Le nozze di Figaro at Salzburg Festival.

=== Oratorio ===
Schuen is a sought-after oratorio singer. In addition to numerous masses and cantatas, he has sung the bass parts in Bach's Christmas Oratorio, St. John Passion and Mass in B minor, Haydn's Creation, Handel's Messiah, Mozart's Requiem, in Brahms' German Requiem, and the Christ in Bach's St. Matthew Passion and the baritone solos in Fauré's Requiem with the Berlin Philharmonic under Sir Simon Rattle in Madrid and Barcelona.

=== Concerto ===
In the season 2022/2023, he performed in Beethoven's Symphony No. 9 under Andris Nelsons at Gewandhaus, Leipzig and in Mahler's Symphony No. 8 under Riccardo Chailly at La Scala, Milan.

=== Lieder ===
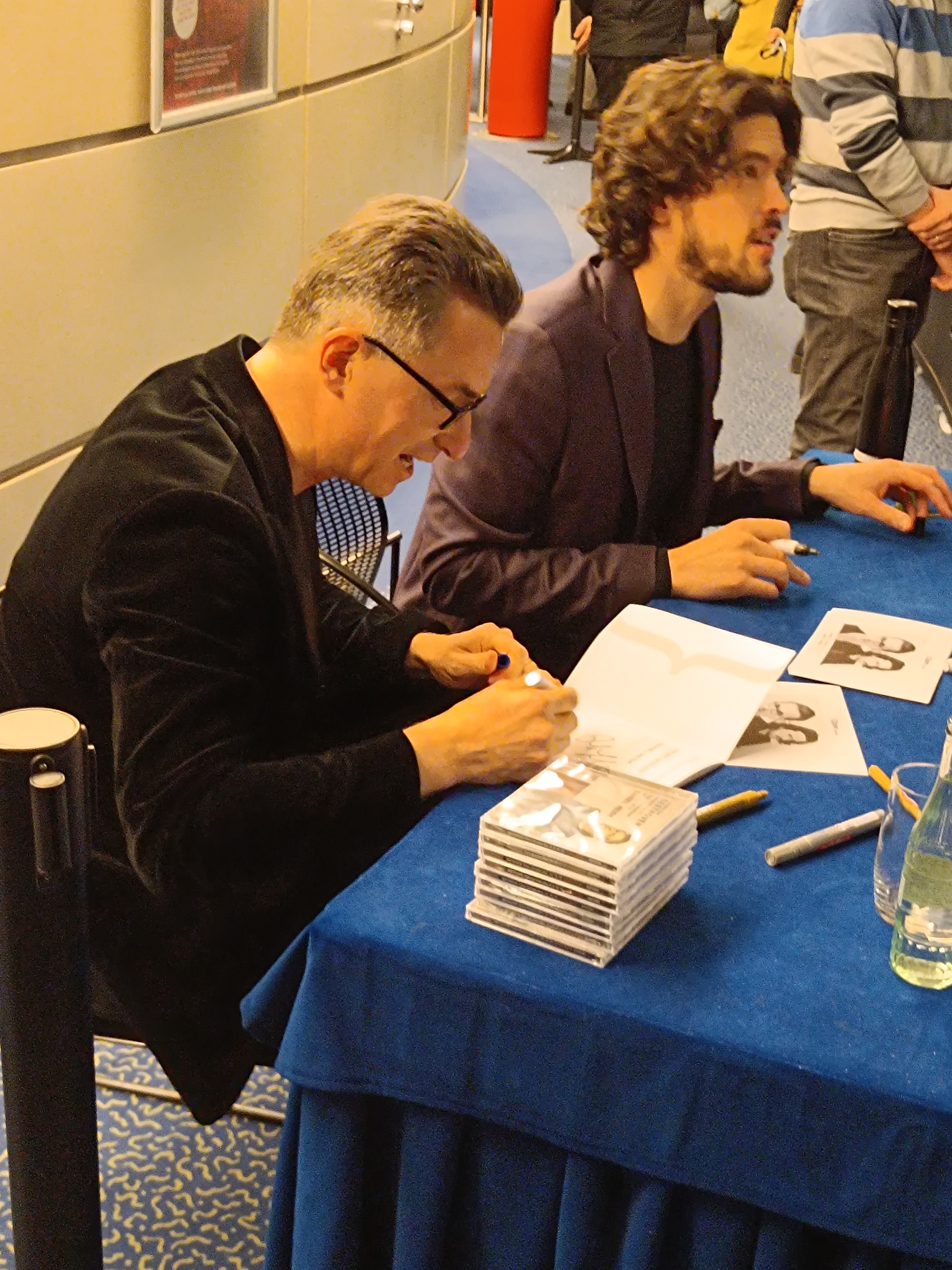
Schuen and Heide at Oper Frankfurt 2023

In the lied area he works with the pianist Daniel Heide. His repertoire includes Schubert's Winterreise and Mahler's Lieder eines fahrenden Gesellen. In 2009 he premiered Herbert Grassl's song cycle ... Bald ist mir nimmer kalt for voice and drums. In 2014 he made his debut with recitals at London's Wigmore Hall.

== Recordings ==
Schuen has been the exclusive recording artist for Deutsche Grammophon since 2021.

- Heine, Heinrich; Schumann, Robert; Goethe, Johann Wolfgang von; Wolf, Hugo; Martin, Frank; Hofmannsthal, Hugo von; Naxos Digital Services US (2015), Vocal Recital: Schuen Andre (baritone) - SCHUMANN, R., Hong Kong: Naxos Digital Services US Inc., OCLC 1180390644
- Beethoven, Ludwig van; Schuen, Andrè; Boulanger Trio (2017), Irish & Scottish songs, Cologne, Germany: CAvi-music, OCLC 1033675189
- Schubert, Franz; Schuen, Andrè; Heide, Daniel (2018), Wanderer (in German), CAvi-music, OCLC 1060575337
- Liszt, Franz; Heide, Daniel; Schuen, Andrè (2019), Sonetti del Petrarca 47, 104, 123 (in undetermined language), Avi-Service for Music, OCLC 1142098175
- Schubert, Franz; Heide, Daniel; Schuen, Andrè (2021), Die schöne Müllerin (in German), [Germany]: Deutsche Grammophon, OCLC 1251431768
- Larcher, Thomas; Schuen, Andrè; Lintu, Hannu; Radion sinfoniaorkesteri (2021), Symphony no. 2. "Kenotaph"; Die Nacht der Verlorenen (in German), Helsinki: Ondine, OCLC 1312273375
- Schubert, Franz; Heide, Daniel; Schuen, Andrè (2023), Schwanengesang (in German), Deutsche Grammophon, OCLC 1375989532, Opus Klassik 2023

== Awards ==
- 2014: Österreichischer Musiktheaterpreis, ORF III Publikumspreis
- 2026 Opus Klassik, Male singer of the year
