= Ganes (band) =

Italian female band

Ganes is a female pop trio from La Val, Italy founded in 2009 which sings in the Ladin language. The band consists of sisters Elisabeth Schuen, Marlene Schuen and their cousin Maria Moling.

On 14 August 2015, they performed together with Corin Curschellas, as well as Patricia Draeger and Barbara Gisler.

== Gallery ==
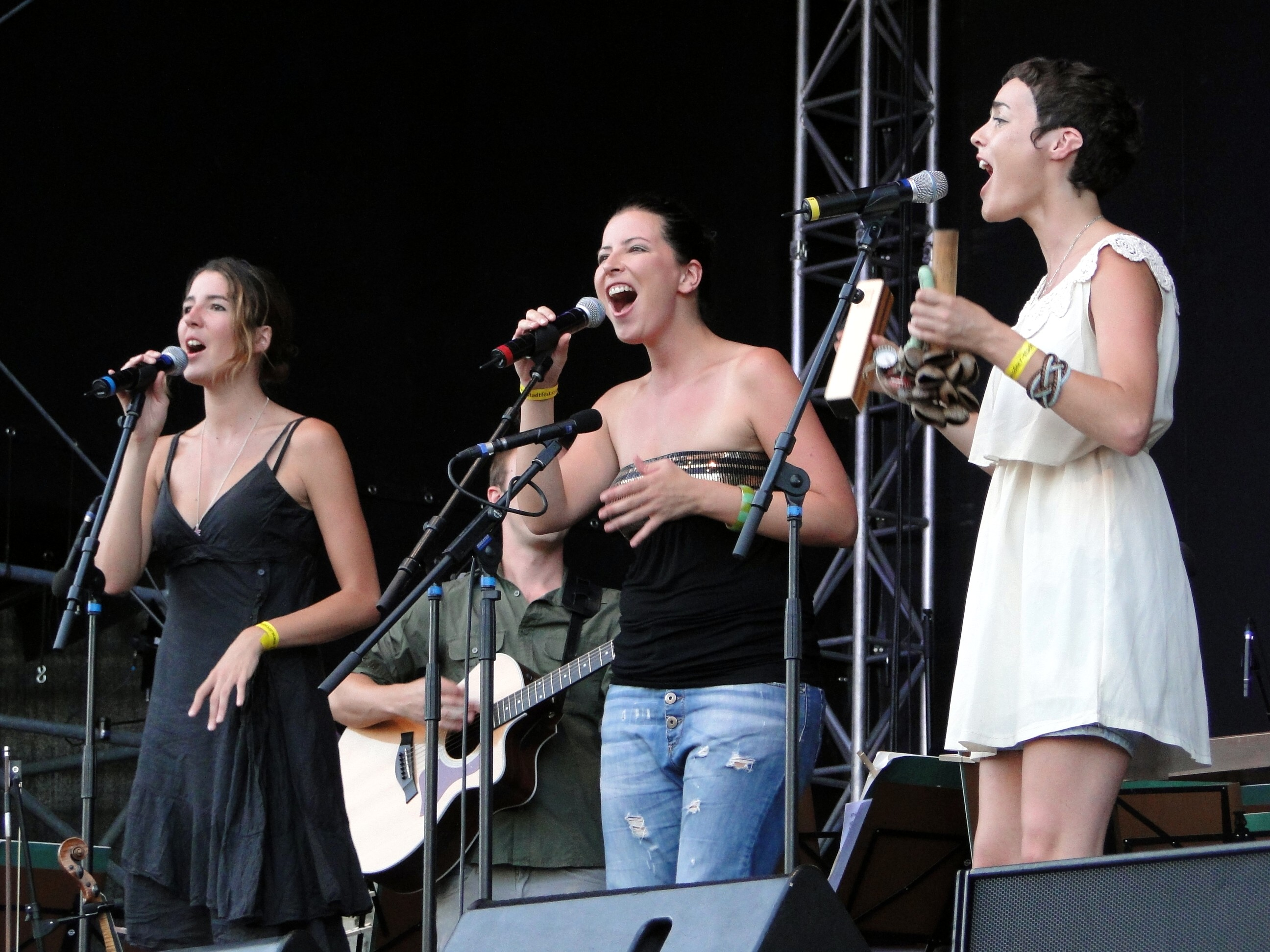
Ganes 2012

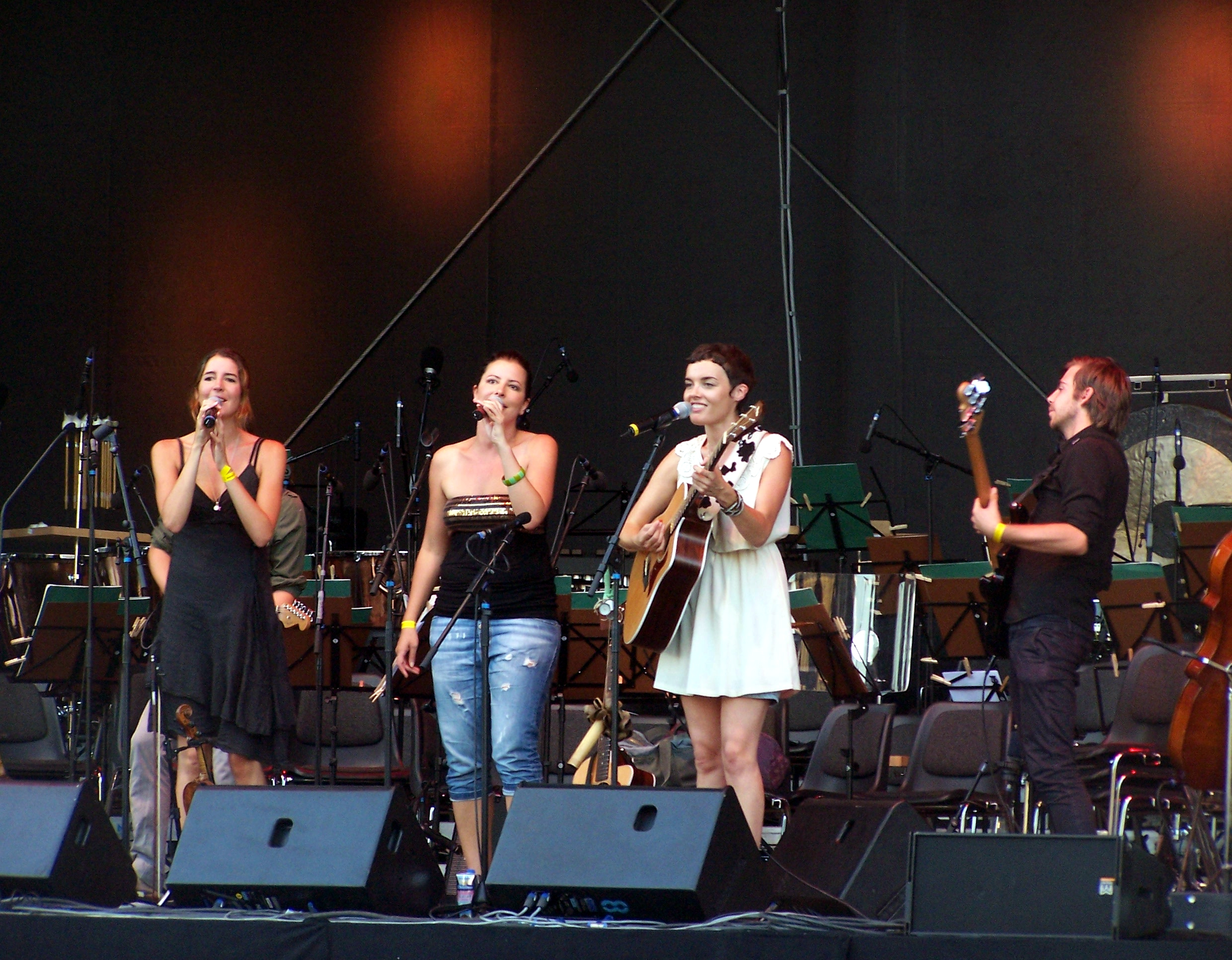
Ganes in 2012

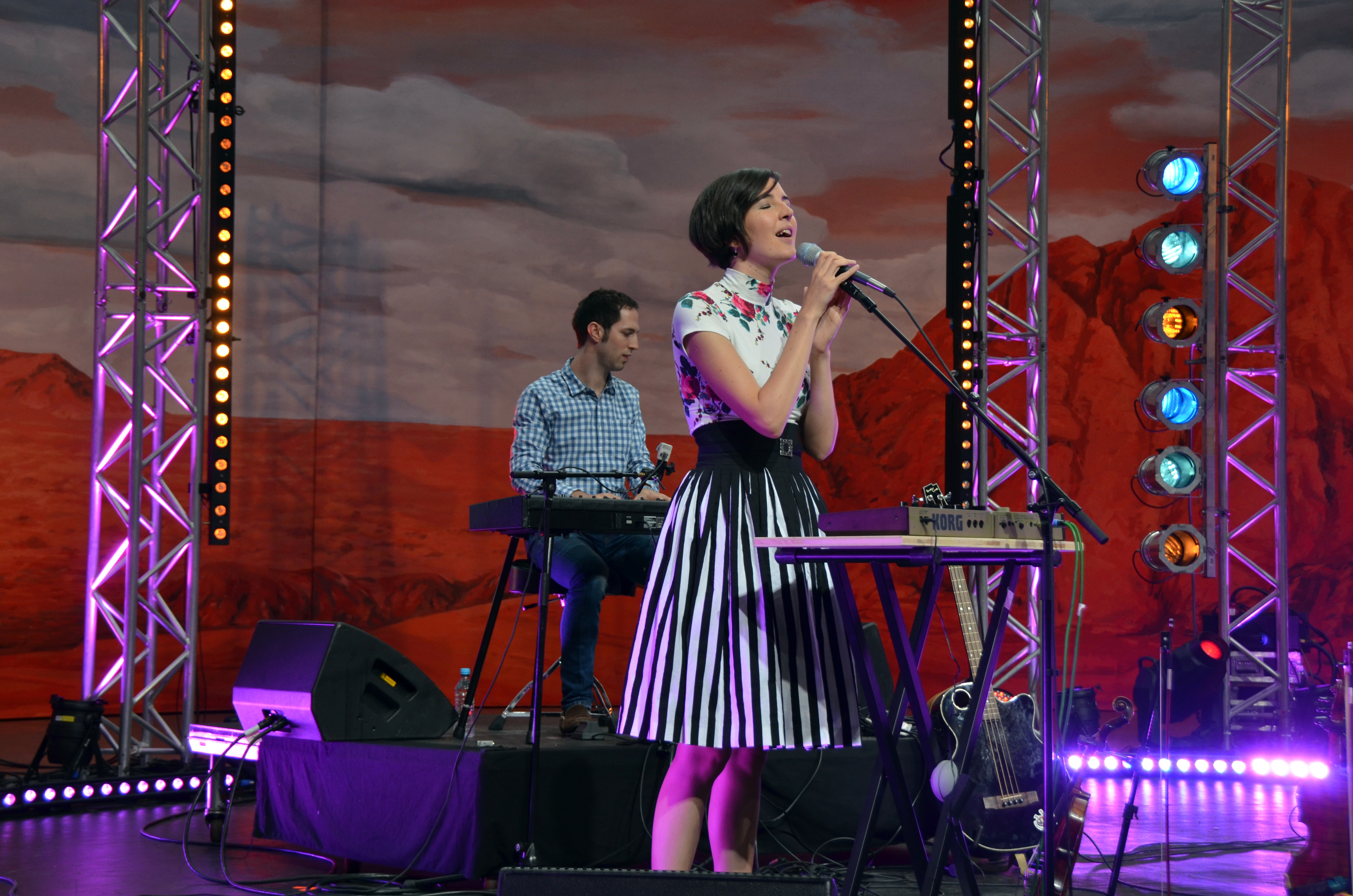
Heimatsound-Festival 2014 Ganes

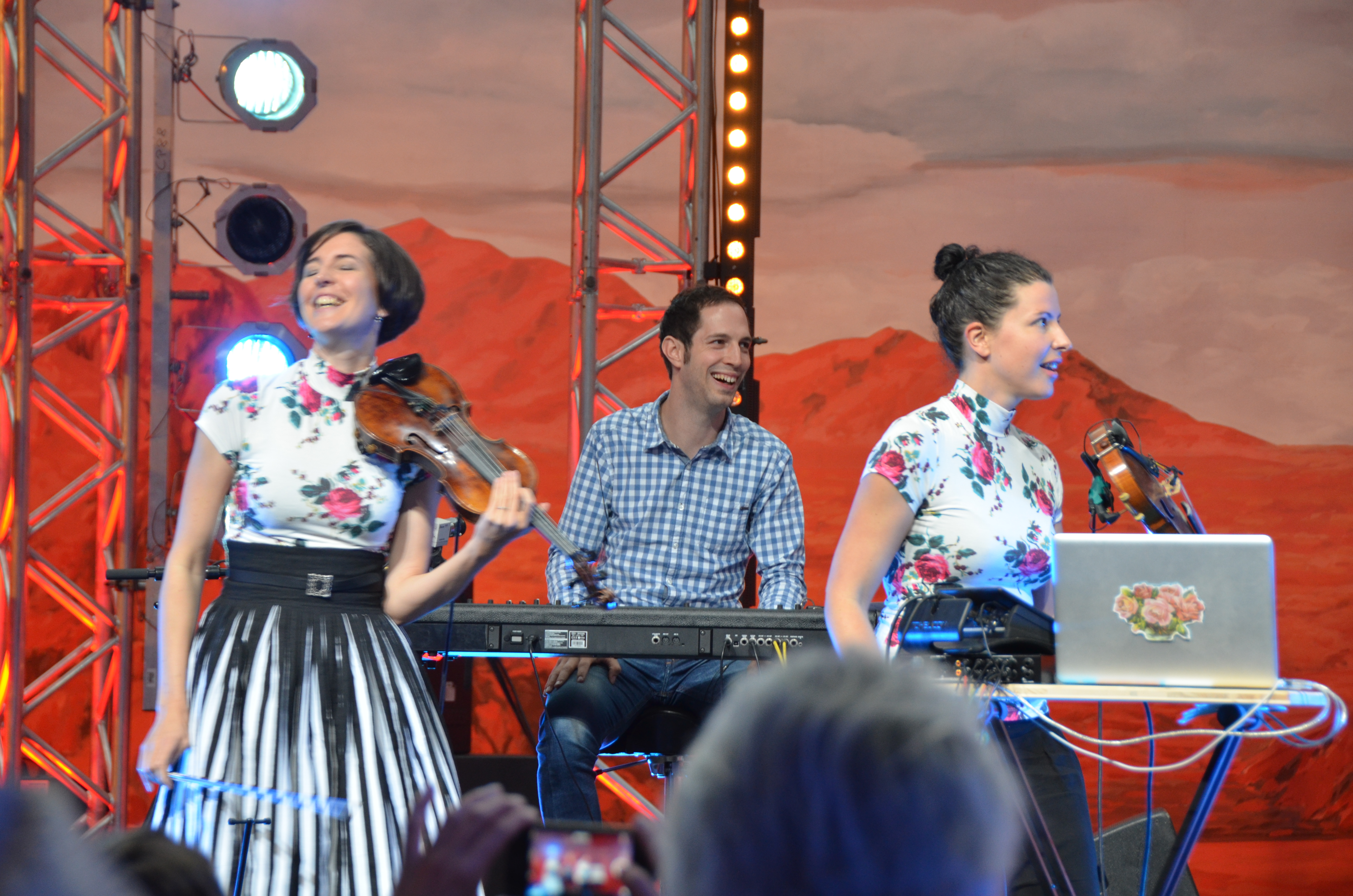
Heimatsound-Festival 2014 Ganes (2)

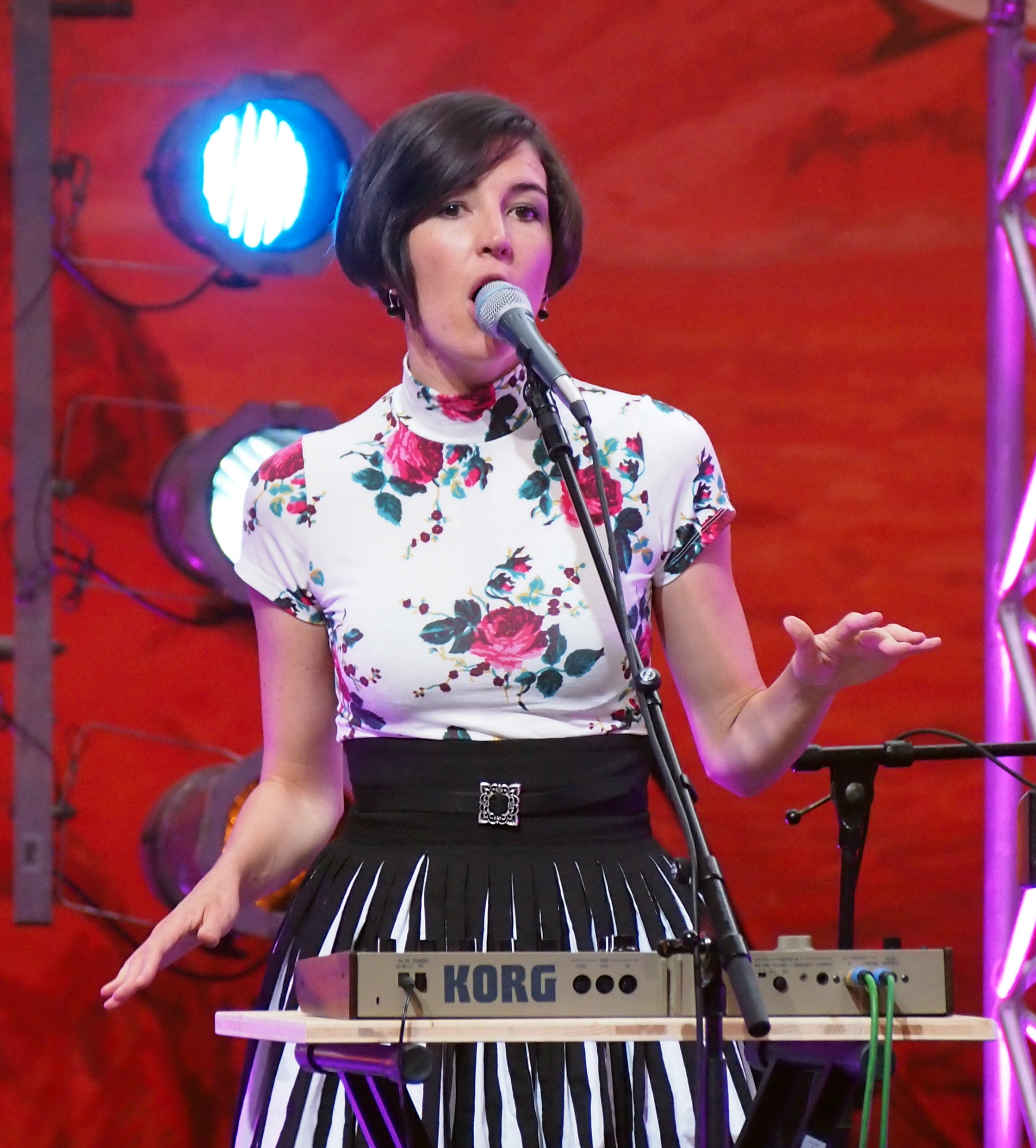
Heimatsound-Festival 2014 Ganes (3)

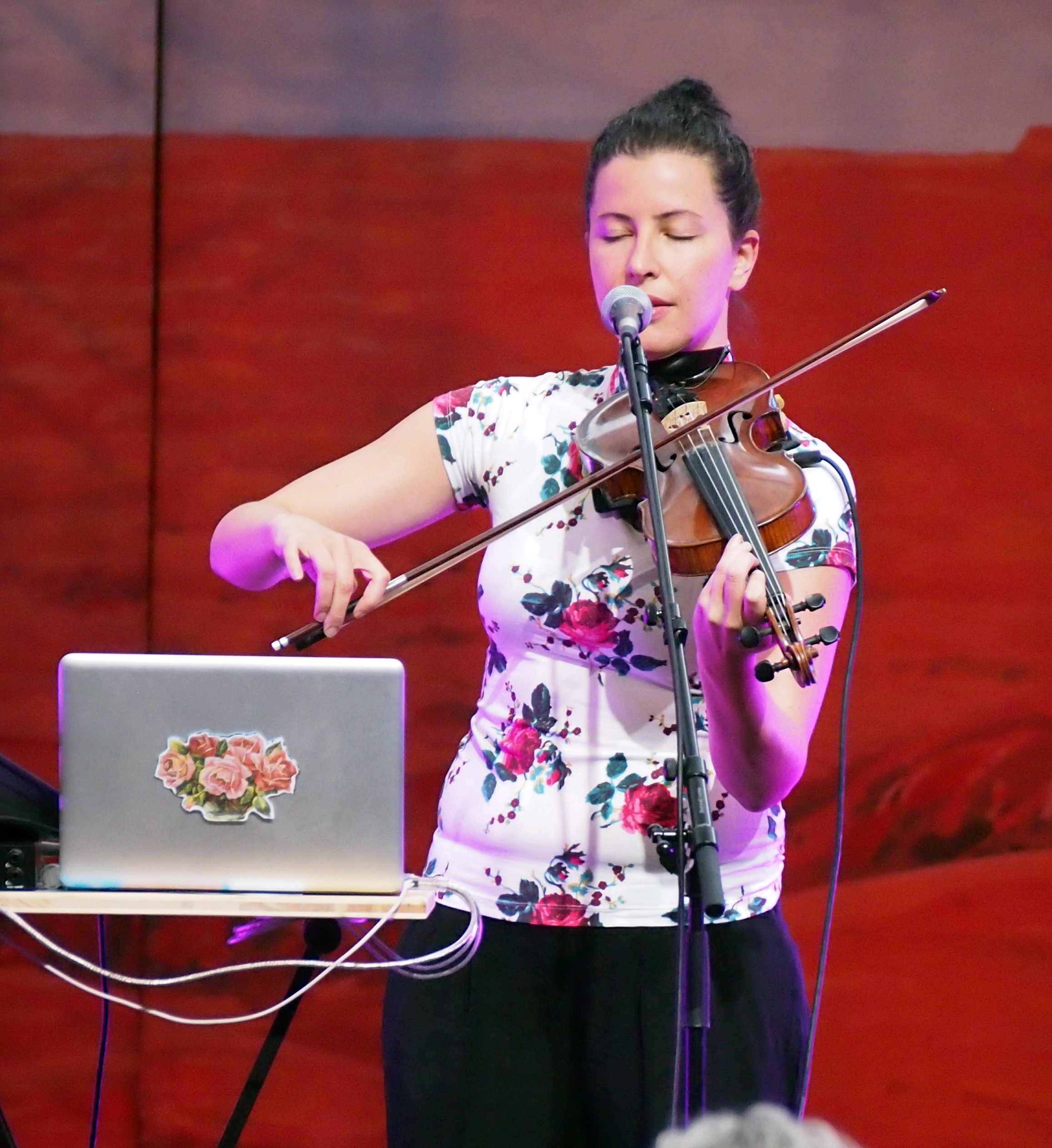
Heimatsound-Festival 2014 Ganes (4)

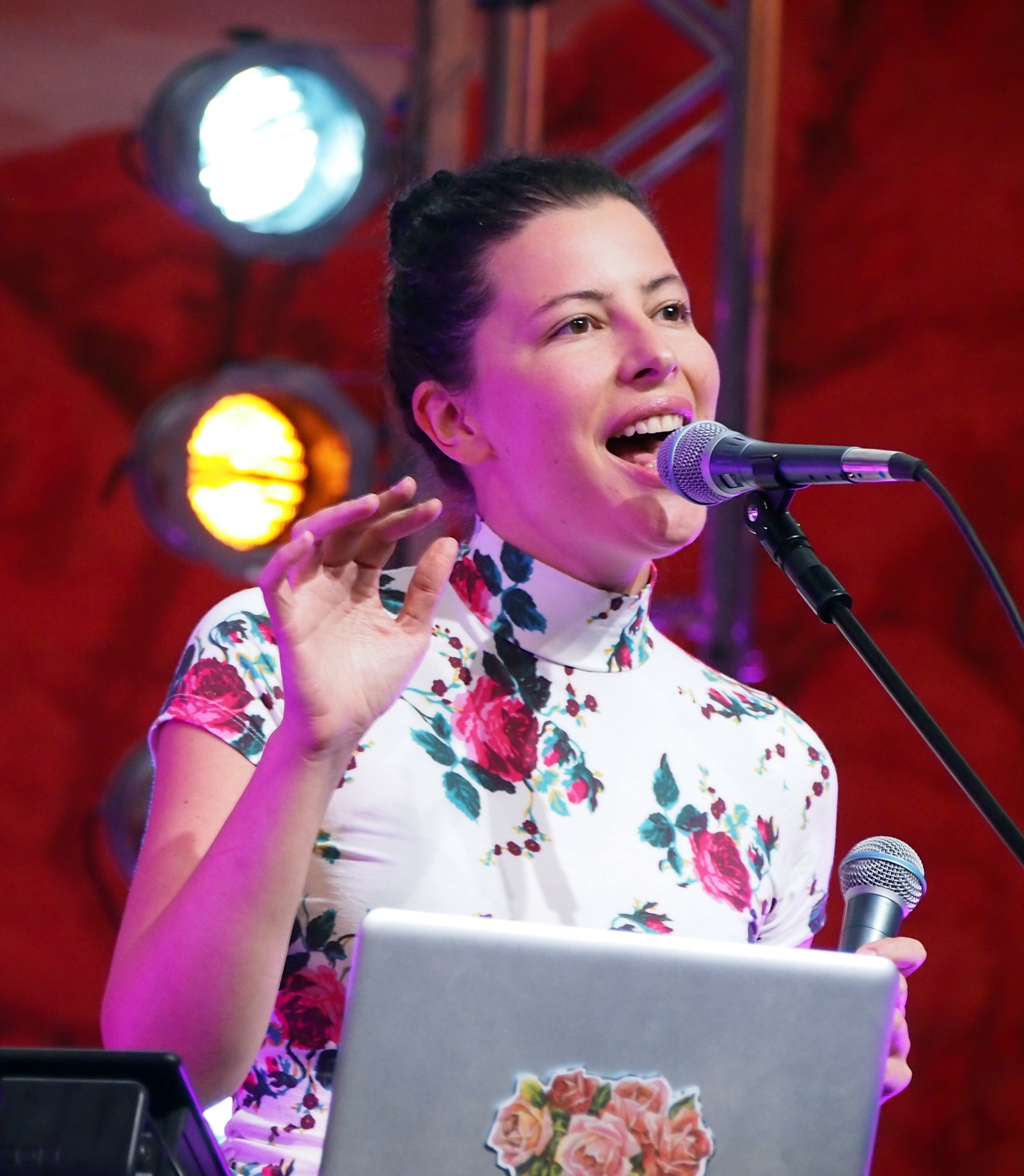
Heimatsound-Festival 2014 Ganes (5)

== Discography ==
Albums:

- 2010: Rai de sorëdl ("ray of sun"), Sony Music
- 2011: Mai guai ("no problem")
- 2012: Parores & Neores – with English bonus versions to some tracks
- 2014: Caprize – with English version of the single "Bang Bang"
- 2016: An Cunta Che
