= Anett Fritsch =

German opera singer

- Born: 1986 (age 38–39); Plauen, Germany
- Education: University of Music and Theatre Leipzig
- Occupation: Operatic soprano

Anett Fritsch (born 1986) is a German operatic soprano who has appeared at major opera houses and festivals, especially in Mozart roles.

== Life and career ==
Fritsch was born in Plauen in 1986. She attended the Adolph-Diesterweg-Gymnasium there. She sang in the choir of the Plauen Theatre from age 13, given her first solo role at age 15. She won the Internationaler Johann-Sebastian-Bach-Wettbewerb in 2001. Fritsch studied voice with Jürgen Kurth at the University of Music and Theatre Leipzig. She was coached by Ruth Ziesak and Anna Reynolds, and now works with Carol Vaness. She was successful at competitions between 2001 and 2007.

She was first a member ot the Leipzig Opera, where her roles included Giannetta in Donizetti's L'elisir d'amore and Frasquita in Bizet's Carmen. She appeared in lead roles such as Mimi in Puccini's La bohème at the Theater Bielefeld and Marzelline in Beethoven's Fidelio at the Tiroler Festspiele Erl. She was a member of the ensemble of the Deutsche Oper am Rhein from 2009 to 2015 where she performed some vital Mozart roles such as Pamina in Die Zauberflöte, Konstanze in Die Entführung aus dem Serail and Susanna in Le nozze di Figaro, and as Marie in Donizetti's La fille du régiment, Anne Trulove in Strawinsky's The Rake's Progress and Blanche in Poulenc's Dialogues des Carmélites.

Fritsch first appeared at the Glyndebourne Festival in 2011, as Almirena in Handel's Rinaldo, She performed as Merione in Gluck's Telemaco at the Theater an der Wien in 2012, conducted by René Jacobs, and as Fiordiligi in Mozart's Così fan tutte at the Teatro Real in Madrid in 2013. This production, directed by Michael Haneke, was also presented at La Monnaie in Brussels and the 2014 Wiener Festwochen. She sang Cherubino in Le nozze di Figaro on a 2013 concert tour of René Jacobs conducting the Freiburger Barockorchester to Paris, Lyon and Barcelona, among others. She first performed at the Salzburg Festival in 2014, as Donna Elvira in a new production of Mozart's Don Giovanni, directed by Sven-Eric Bechtolf and conducted by Christoph Eschenbach.

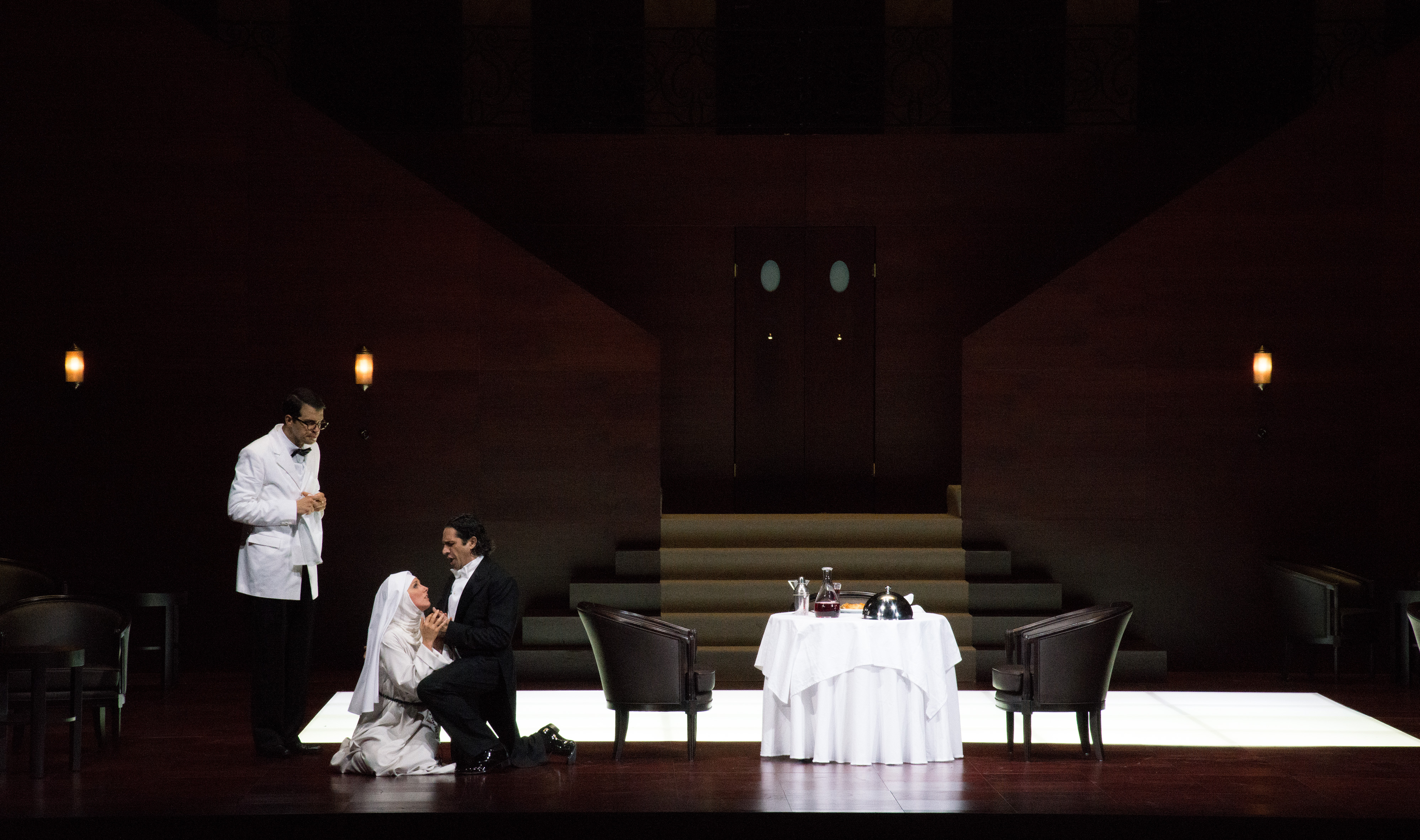
Fritsch with Luca Pisaroni in Don Giovanni, Salzburg Festival 2014

She first appeared as the Countess in Le nozze di Figaro in 2014 at the Teatro Real portraying the role also at the Theater an der Wien in 2015 and at the Salzburg Festival in another Bechtolf production. She played Cherubino on stage at the Bavarian State Opera in Munich in 2015, making her one of the singers who performed the three leading roles in this opera. She first appeared at the Lucerne Festival in 2018, singing Alban Berg's Altenberg Lieder with the Concertgebouw Orchestra conducted by Manfred Honeck.

Fritsch has been married to Sven-Eric Bechtolf since February 2016.

== Awards ==
- 2001 Internationaler Johann-Sebastian-Bach-Wettbewerb, First Prize
- 2006 and 2007 Kammeroper Schloss Rheinsberg competition, recipient
