= Ruben Drole =

Swiss operatic bass-baritone

Ruben Drole (born 1980) is a Swiss operatic bass-baritone.

== Life ==
Drole was born in Switzerland to a Slovenian father and a Spanish mother. He studied with Jane Thorner Mengedoht at the Zurich University of the Arts and won several singing competitions during his studies; he graduated with distinction.

In 2004, he was accepted into the International Opera Studio Zurich, and in 2005 into the ensemble of the Zurich Opera House. There he was immediately entrusted with larger roles, such as Lucio Cinna in Johann Christian Bach's Lucio Silla, Simone in Mozart's La finta semplice, Haly in Rossini's L'italiana in Algeri and Papageno in Nikolaus Harnoncourt's Magic Flute production by Martin Kušej, which was also released on DVD by Deutsche Grammophon. In the three Lorenzo Da Ponte operas staged by Sven-Eric Bechtolf and conducted by Franz Welser-Möst, Drole took on Guglielmo, Figaro and Leporello. He also sang the title role in Giovanni Paisiello's Il barbiere di Siviglia, Argante in Handel's Rinaldo under the conduct of William Christie and also the Worm in Verdi's Luisa Miller.

In the summer of 2006, he made a guest appearance as Haly at the Aix-en-Provence Festival, with the Cleveland Orchestra singing the three Da Ponte roles in concert, and in May and June 2011 he portrayed Papageno at the Spoleto Festival USA. Shortly afterwards, he made his debut as Kecal in Bedřich Smetana's The Bartered Bride at the Styriarte in Graz, conducted by Nikolaus Harnoncourt. In February 2012 he sang and performed Figaro in a production by Harald Schmidt with the Bochumer Symphoniker conducted by Steven Sloane.

At the Salzburg Whitsun Festival and Salzburg Festival 2012 he took over Achilla in Handel's Giulio Cesare in Egitto - with four countertenors, Cecilia Bartoli as Cleopatra and Giovanni Antonini on the podium. In 2013, he sang the role of the Duke of La Trémouille in a Concert performance by Walter Braunfels Szenen aus dem Leben der Heiligen Johanna in Salzburg. In late 2013/early 2014, he embodied the Minister in the Fidelio production by Andreas Homoki at the Zurich Opera House.

With the Concentus Musicus Wien under Harnoncourt, Drole completed a tour of Japan with the Requiem (Mozart) and the Messiah, sang Beethoven's Christ on the Mount of Olives at the Vienna Musikverein and the Lucerne Festival, as well as The Creation at the Styriarte Graz in July 2010 and Leporello in concert at the Theater an der Wien in March 2014. He also took the bass solos in Mozart's Coronation Mass with the Royal Concertgebouw Orchestra conducted by Ton Koopman and in Handel's Israel in Egypt with the Concerto Köln conducted by Emmanuelle Haïm. With the Cleveland Orchestra conducted by Franz Welser-Möst, he has made guest appearances in Cleveland, at Lincoln Center in New York, at the Alte Oper in Frankfurt and at the Salle Pleyel in Paris. Drole also regularly performs Liederabend.

== Awards ==
- 2004: Prix des amis du Festival d’art lyrique, Aix-en-Provence
- 2005: Cultural Award of the "Pro Europa" Foundation
- 2008: Carl-Heinrich-Ernst-Kunstpreis

== Discography ==
- Papageno in the magic flute
- Haly in L’italiana in Algeri
