= Lorenzo Alvary =

Hungarian-American operatic bass

Lorenzo Alvary, also Lorenz Alvari (20 February 1909 – 13 December 1996) was a Hungarian-American operatic bass.

== Life and career ==
Born in Debrecen, Alvary first studied law in Geneva and Budapest, then singing in Milan and Berlin. He made his opera debut in 1934 at the Royal Opera in Budapest. In 1937 he got an engagement at the Vienna State Opera. In 1938 he emigrated to the U.S., where he became an American citizen in 1944. He first performed there at the San Francisco Opera in 1939 as Ochs in Der Rosenkavalier, and returned regularly until 1977. In 1942 he got an engagement at the Metropolitan Opera in New York City until 1961, extended from 1962 to 1972 and again from 1977 to 1978, when he retired at the age of 69. He died there at age 87.
