= Graziella Sciutti =

Italian opera singer

- Graziella Sciutti (photo with dedication)
- Occupation: opera soprano singer

Graziella Sciutti (17 April 1927 – 9 April 2001) was an Italian soprano opera singer and later vocal teacher and opera producer.

== Career ==
Sciutti was born in Turin, Italy. Her parents were musical, her father being an organist; her mother was French. She studied privately with Ginevra Marinuzzi, then in Rome at the Accademia di Santa Cecilia under Rachele Margliano-Mori with the intention of making a career on the concert platform. From 1948 she participated in broadcasts on Italian Radio, her first being L'oca del Cairo.

Sciutti's concert debut was in 1949 in Venice, with 18th-century Italian songs. Her stage debut at Aix-en-Provence in 1951 singing Elisetta in Il matrimonio segreto and the woman in The Telephone and realized that she "was a person who could do opera". She appeared as Rosina in Rossini's The Barber of Seville in 1954. Later she appeared in London at the Royal Opera House, Covent Garden (debut 1956 as Oscar in Un ballo in maschera), at Salzburg, Vienna and in San Francisco.

Referred to as "The Callas of the Piccola Scala" Sciutti was renowned for her interpretation of Mozart's "soubrette" characters, Susanna, Despina, and perhaps especially for her singing in the role of Zerlina in the 1959 recording of Mozart's Don Giovanni, with the Philharmonia Orchestra under the direction of Carlo Maria Giulini. She created the title role in Sauguet’s Les caprices de Marianne in 1954.

In later years she turned her attention to teaching and operatic production. She produced Poulenc's La voix humaine at Glyndebourne in 1977, and Donizetti's L'elisir d'amore at the Royal Opera House, Covent Garden and San Francisco, and in 1985 Mozart's The Magic Flute at Koblenz. She taught at London's Royal College of Music, where her pupils included Anna Maria Panzarella. She died in Geneva.

== Recordings ==
In addition to pirate and radio recordings, Graziella Sciutti’s records include excerpts from Mozart (French HMV), Ines in Il Trovatore, Tebaldo in Don Carlo and Barbarina in Le nozze di Figaro (Cetra), Nanetta in Falstaff (CBS), Norina in Don Pasquale (Decca), Rita (Cetra), Mozart arias and concert arias (Decca), Rosina in Il barbiere di Siviglia (Delysé), Giulia in La scala di seta (RCA), Livietta in Livietta e Tracollo (Fonit), Carolina in Il matrimonio segreto (Columbia), Marzellina in Fidelio (Decca), Lisette in La Rondine (RCA), Amor in Orfeo ed Euridice (DG), Morgana in Alcina (Decca), Ginevra in Ariodante (RCA), Zerlina in Don Giovanni (Philips and HMV), Susanna in Le nozze di Figaro (HMV), and Despina in Così fan tutte (Philips).

== Video ==
- She can be seen on black-and-white video as Susanna in Le nozze di Figaro, in a live performance with Dietrich Fischer-Dieskau, Geraint Evans, Hilde Gueden, and Evelyn Lear, conducted by Lorin Maazel, from the Salzburg Festival, 1963. The DVD is published by Video Artists International, Inc. Catalog number DVD 4519.

== Sources ==
- Obituary in The Observer
- Kozinn, Allan (April 14, 2001). "Graziella Sciutti, 73, Soprano and Director". The New York Times.
