= Carlos Feller =

Opera singer (1923–2018)

- Born: Kalman Felberbaum; 30 July 1923; Złoczów, Second Polish Republic
- Died: 21 December 2018 (aged 95); Kempten, Germany
- Occupation: Operatic bass
- Organizations: Teatro Colón; Cologne Opera

Kalman Felberbaum (30 July 1923 – 21 December 2018) was an operatic bass singer who enjoyed an international career using the professional/stage name Carlos Feller. Of Polish descent, he grew up in Argentina, and made a career in Germany, based for decades at the Cologne Opera. He specialized in comedic supporting roles, especially bad-guys and strange, quirky characters. His signature role was Don Alfonso in Mozart's Così fan tutte.

== Early life ==
He was born near Lviv in the western part of Ukraine, but which was part of the Second Polish Republic at the time to a Jewish family. The family emigrated to Buenos Aires, Argentina, a few years later, and thereby avoided becoming casualties of the Holocaust. His parents originally wanted him to become a dentist; however, he soon began his vocal training at the opera school of the Teatro Colón. His stage career launched with the comprimario role of the doctor in Debussy's Pelléas et Mélisande there in 1946.

== Career ==
Feller stayed in Buenos Aires for more than ten years. He returned to Europe in 1958, when the Chamber Opera of Buenos Aires appeared at the World Exhibition in Brussels. He became a member of the Staatstheater Mainz, followed by engagements from 1960 at the Frankfurt Opera, and from 1962 at the Opernhaus Kiel. He appeared at the London Sadler's Wells Opera in 1958, in Cimarosa's Il maestro di cappella, and at the Edinburgh Festival as Dr. Bombasto in Busoni's Arlecchino.

Feller returned to Buenos Aires in 1966 for three years. From 1969 he was a member of the Cologne Opera for decades, where he performed a variety of roles, as an excellent actor as well as singer. He sang several Mozart roles in the cycle staged by Jean-Pierre Ponnelle: Leporello in Don Giovanni, Bartolo in Le nozze di Figaro, and Don Alfonso in his Così fan tutte. He also appeared in contemporary opera, as Doctor in Alban Berg's Wozzeck, and as Schigolch in his Lulu. He was a frequent guest at international opera houses and festivals, including the Bavarian State Opera in Munich, La Monnaie in Brussels, and the Glyndebourne Festival Opera. At the Salzburg Festival, he appeared in 1969 as Uberto in Pergolesi's La serva padrona, in 1979 as Dr. Bartolo in Le nozze di Figaro, in 1982 as Don Alfonso, and in 1984 as the notary in Der Rosenkavalier by Richard Strauss. In 1988, Feller made his debut at the Metropolitan Opera, New York City, as Don Alfonso, regarded as his signature role, and returned in 1990 as Dr. Bartolo in Rossini's Il Barbiere di Siviglia.

He retired after a final concert at the end of 2009. He died in December 2018 in the Bavarian town of Kempten.

== Recordings ==
Feller's audio recordings include complete operas, as Dr. Bartolo in both Mozart's Le nozze di Figaro and Rossini's Il barbiere di Siviglia, Alfonso in Mozart's Così fan tutte, the notary in Der Rosenkavalier by Richard Strauss, and roles in Rossini's La cambiale di matrimonio and Il signor Bruschino.

Performances are available on video as Dr. Bartolo (again both Rossini's, and Mozart's), Geronimo in Cimarosa's Il matrimonio segreto and Bardolfo in Salieri's Falstaff from the 1995 Schwetzingen Festival.
