= Susan Larson =

American soprano opera singer and author (born 1944)

Susan Larson (born 1944) is an American soprano opera singer and author. Larson was born in New Rochelle, New York and she graduated with a Bachelor of Music from Indiana University in 1965. She received a Master of Music from the New England Conservatory in 1969.

== Career highlights ==
- Charter member, Emmanuel Music, Boston
- Appearances with Santa Fe Chamber Music Festival, Ravinia, St. Louis and Bethlemehm Bach Festivals, Monadnock Music Festival, Pepsico SummerFare Festival, Theater der Welt Festival
- Member, Liederkreis Quartet (Naumburg Foundation Award for chamber music, 1980)
- Peter Sellars production of Mozart's Don Giovanni, Manchester NH 1980, role of Donna Elvira
- Peter Sellars production of Handel's Saul, 1981, role of Michal
- American Repertory Theater, Handel's Orlando, 1982, role of Dorinda
- American Repertory Theater, Rodgers & Hart's The Boys from Syracuse, 1983 (Best Actress in a Musical, Boston Theatre Critics Circle)
- Theater der Welt prize awarded for Sellars' production of Così fan tutte 1989
- Opera Company of Boston, Robert DiDomenica's "The Balcony," (role of Carmen) in Boston and at the Bolsoi in Moscow
- She has published two novels: Sam (a pastoral) and The Murder of Figaro
- Member, Board of Directors, Guerilla Opera

== Recordings ==
- London Records CDs of Così fan tutte (as Fiordiligi), Le nozze di Figaro (as Cherubino), and Giulio Cesare in Egitto as Cleopatra
- Liebeslieder Waltzer (Brahms) with Liederkreis Quartet, "A Samuel Chapter" (John Harbison)
- Emmanuel Music, Schütz motets

== Premiere performances ==
- "Mirabai Songs" (John Harbison)
- "On This Most Voluptuous Night" (Yehudi Wyner)
- Carmen, in Robert DiDomenica's operatic adaptation of Jean Genet's The Balcony, with the Opera Company of Boston (1990).

== Filmography ==
- Le nozze di Figaro (1990) (TV) Cherubino
- Giulio Cesare in Egitto (1990) (TV) Cleopatra
- Così fan tutte (1990) (TV) Fiordiligi

== Books ==
- Sam (a pastoral) (Savvy Press, 2012)
- The Murder of Figaro (Savvy Press, 2019)

== Sources ==
- Dyer, Richard (February 5, 1987). "Susan Larson A Bewitching Contradiction". Boston Globe. Boston, MA. Archived from the original on November 5, 2012 – via HighBeam Research.
- Oestreich, James. "Jean Genet's 'Balcony' Makes Debut as Opera". The New York Times, June 17, 1990
