= Alison Hagley =

English operatic soprano

Alison Hagley (born 9 May 1961) is an English opera singer.

== Life ==
She was born in London. The soprano learned her craft at the Guildhall School of Music from 1979 to 1984, and at the National Opera Studio London in 1987. She made her stage debut in 1985 as Rodelinda in Handel's opera at the Aldeburgh Festival. In addition, she performed the same year in Handel's Flavio at the Batignano Festival, in Mozart's La finta giardiniera in Camden in 1986, and as Clorinda in Rossini's La Cenerentola in 1987.

The Glyndebourne Festival Opera has been crucial for the course of her career, and she appeared there for many years. In 1988, she performed at the festival for the first time, starring in the opera L'enfant et les sortilèges. She returned as Papagena, Nanetta, Susanna and Zerlina and also joined at the Glyndebourne Touring Opera as Varvara and Despina.

In 1986, she made her debut as 1st flower girl in Richard Wagner's Parsifal at the Royal Opera House, Covent Garden, and appeared there in Peter Grimes and Falstaff.

She has appeared as Susanna in Mozart's Le nozze di Figaro in Paris, London, Munich, Toronto, Glyndebourne, Ludwigsburg and Venice, and has recorded this role on CD and DVD.

Pierre Boulez and director Peter Stein chose Alison Hagley to play Mélisande in their highly acclaimed production of Debussy's Pelléas et Mélisande for Welsh National Opera in 1992. This production was recorded on DVD.
