= Teresa Stich-Randall =

American opera singer (1927–2007)

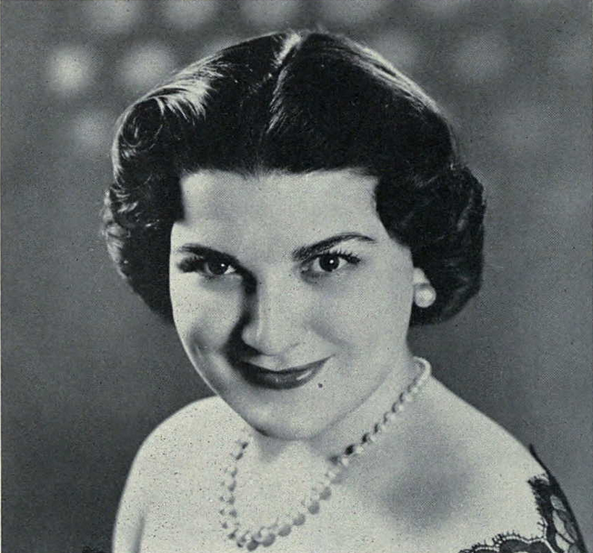
Stich-Randall at the University of Michigan, 1955-1956

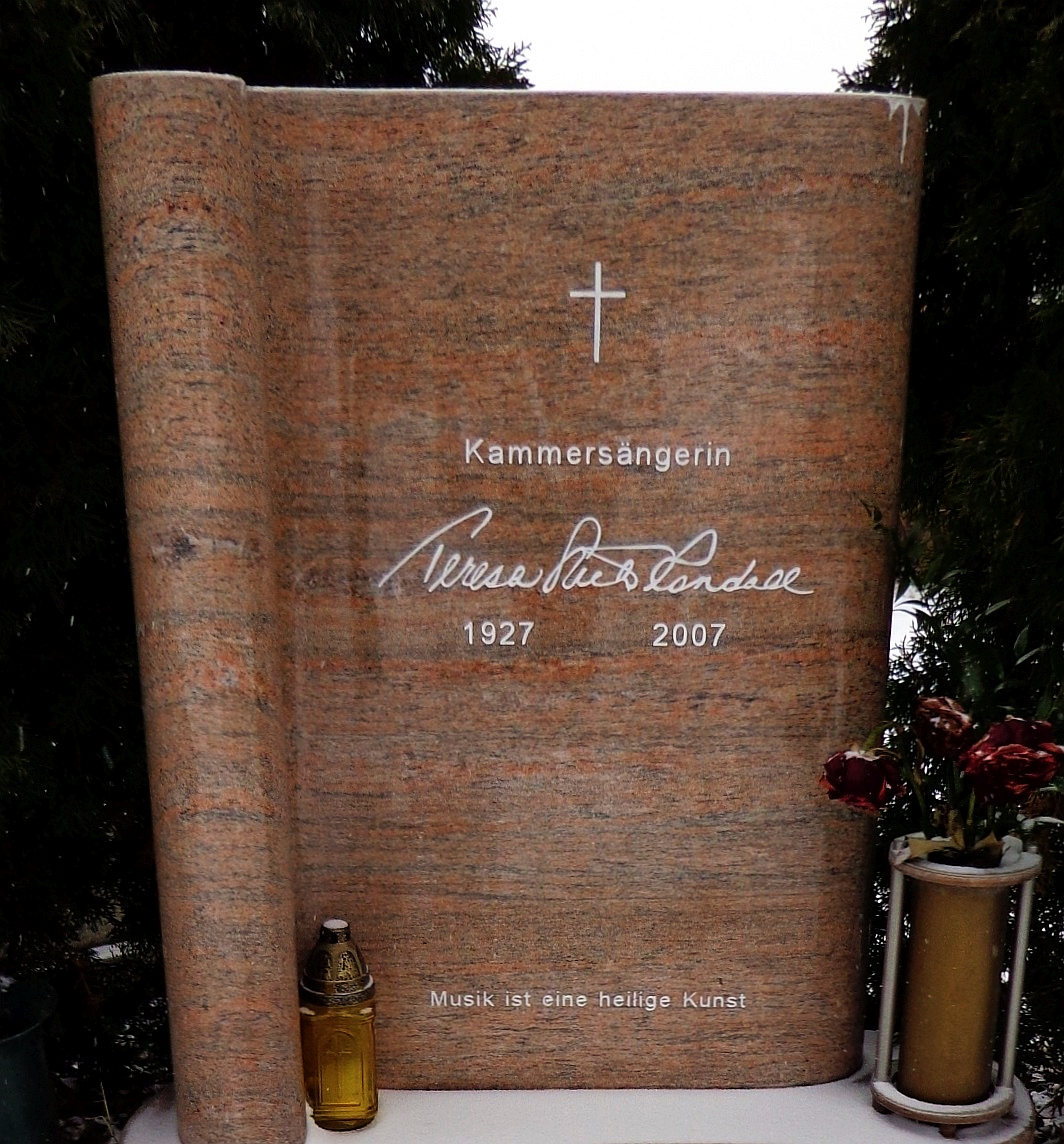
Feuerhalle Simmering, grave of Teresa Stich-Randall

Teresa Stich-Randall (née Stich; 24 December 1927 – 17 July 2007) was a European-based American soprano opera singer.

== Biography ==
Teresa Stich was born in West Hartford, Connecticut, to John Stich (1898–1957) and Mary Theresa (née Zils) Stich (1904–1986) on Christmas Eve, 1927. She had a brother, Edward. She studied at the Hartt College of Music under Ivan Velikanoff. She later studied music at Columbia University and at the University of Perugia. She made her operatic debut in the role of "Henrietta M." in Virgil Thomson's The Mother of Us All in 1947, and she sang the title role in Otto Luening's Evangeline in 1948.

She was discovered in the late 1940s, having adopted the name Randall to her surname (she reportedly said it was a favorite uncle's name), by Arturo Toscanini, who engaged her for a series of performances with his NBC Symphony Orchestra in New York City. Toscanini described her at the time as "the find of the century". She appeared as Nanetta in his two-part NBC radio broadcast of Verdi's Falstaff, in 1950, one of Toscanini's most acclaimed performances. It was also released on LP, 45-RPM, and CD.

Stich-Randall travelled on a Fulbright Scholarship to Europe, where she made her name as a singer. She made her European debut in Weber's Oberon in Florence in 1951; she played a mermaid and astonished the audience by singing while she swam in the fountain of the Boboli Gardens. She won a competition in Lausanne the following year. This led to appearances with the Basel Opera in Switzerland. She was a regular performer with the Vienna State Opera and at the Salzburg Festival. From 1955, she was a regular at summer events at Aix-en-Provence in France, where her portrayals of Donna Anna in Don Giovanni and the Countess in The Marriage of Figaro were highly esteemed.

In 1962, the Austrian Government awarded her the title of Kammersängerin, given to esteemed vocal artists. She made her debut at the Chicago Lyric Opera as Gilda in Rigoletto in 1955. She first sang at the Metropolitan Opera in New York City in Così fan tutte in 1961 and remained on their roster of singers until 1966. She made her Boston debut in 1963 for the Peabody Mason Concert series.

Stich-Randall appeared on a number of notable recordings including Falstaff, Der Rosenkavalier, The Marriage of Figaro and Orfeo ed Euridice.

Her career had largely ended by 1980 and she died in Vienna, aged 79, in 2007, of natural causes. She was cremated at Feuerhalle Simmering, where her ashes are buried.
