= Martina Janková =

Czech operatic soprano (born 1972)

Martina Janková (born 1972, Orlová) is a Czech operatic soprano. She has been successful in a number of opera contests, including winning first prize at the competition Neue Stimmen in Gütersloh. She has been a member of the Zürich Opera since 1998. She is particularly known for her portrayals in operas by Wolfgang Amadeus Mozart and George Frideric Handel.

== Biography ==
Janková began her musical training in Ostrava and then pursued further studies in opera at the City of Basel Music Academy. She has also studied in masterclasses with Carlo Bergonzi, Gustav Kuhn and Michael Eliassen. She began her career in the mid 1990s as a member of the International Opera Studio at the Zürich Opera and while in the program portrayed the roles of Rosina in Mozart’s La finta semplice, Karolka in Leoš Janáček’s Jenůfa under the baton of Franz Welser-Möst, and Gianetta in L'elisir d'amore with conductor Nello Santi. She also appeared in Carl Maria von Weber's Oberon under John Eliot Gardiner. She is currently studying with Antonie Denygrova in Prague.

Janková joined the roster of principal singers at the Zürich Opera in 1998 and has been a regular performer there ever since. Among the many roles she has portrayed there are Adele in Die Fledermaus, Almirena in Rinaldo, Amor in Gluck’s Orphée et Eurydice with conductor William Christie, Celia in Mozart’s Lucio Silla with conductor Nikolaus Harnoncourt, Echo in Ariadne auf Naxos, Lenio in The Greek Passion, Marzeline in Fidelio, Pamina in The Magic Flute, the Sand Man in Hänsel und Gretel, Serpetta in La finta giardiniera, the Shepherd in Richard Wagner’s Tannhäuser under the baton of Franz Welser-Möst, and Susanna in Le nozze di Figaro among others. Scheduled upcoming performances for Janková include Zerlina in Don Giovanni (September 2009), Angelica in Orlando (November 2009-January 2010), Despina in Così fan tutte (December 2009), and Servilia in La clemenza di Tito (March 2010).

In addition to her work in Zürich, Janková has also been active as a freelance artist. With the Prague State Opera she has sung Despina for conductor Gustav Kuhn, Sofia in Rossini’s Il Signor Bruschino, and Zerlina under the direction of Katherina Thalbach. At the Grand Théâtre de Genève she has appeared in the title role of Janáček’s The Cunning Little Vixen and as both Drusilla and Fortuna in Monteverdi’s L'incoronazione di Poppea. In March 2009 she made her first appearance in the United States as Susanna in The Marriage of Figaro with the Cleveland Orchestra and conductor Franz Welser-Möst.

Janková has also appeared numerous times at the Salzburg Festival in the last decade, portraying such roles as Echo with Christoph von Dohnanyi, Iphis in Jephtah, Karolka under John Eliot Gardiner, Prima Ancella in Cherubini’s Medea with Sir Charles Mackerras, and most recently Cherubino in The Marriage of Figaro at the 2009 festival. She has also performed the soprano solos in Mahler’s Symphony no. 8 under the baton of Franz Welser-Möst in Salzburg.

As a concert performer, Janková has appeared with orchestras in Poland, Austria, Switzerland, Germany, Italy and Japan. She also been active as an oratorio soloist, notably singing in Mendehlssohn's Elijah with the Israel Philharmonic Orchestra under conductor Wolfgang Sawallisch. She has also performed recitals of lieder at the Rheingau Musik Festival, Janáček Spring Festival, the Chopin Festival in Marienbad, the Martinu Festival, the Festival de Saintes, and concerts with Philippe Herreweghe in Gap and Chambéry to name just a few.
