= Erich Kunz =

Austrian baritone (1909–1995)

- Born: 20 May 1909; Vienna, Austria-Hungary
- Died: 8 September 1995 (aged 86) Vienna, Austria
- Education: Vienna Music Academy
- Occupations: Singer; baritone
- Years active: 1933–1970s

Erich Kunz (20 May 1909 – 8 September 1995) was an Austrian operatic baritone, particularly associated with the roles of Papageno and Beckmesser.

== Early life ==
Born in Vienna, Kunz was educated at the Vienna Music Academy where he was a student of Theo Lierhammer and Hans Duhan.

== Career ==
He made his stage debut in Opava, as Osmin, in 1933. He then sang in Plauen (1936–37) and Breslau (1937–41). In 1936 he was a member of the opera chorus at the Glyndebourne Festival Opera, not returning there again until 1950 when he portrayed Guglielmo in Mozart's Così fan tutte.

He made his debut at the Vienna State Opera in 1940, where he quickly established himself as a specialist of Mozart roles such as Figaro, Leporello, Guglielmo, Papageno, roles he also sang at the Salzburg Festival and Aix-en-Provence Festival. He was also renowned for his portrayal of Beckmesser, which he sang at the Bayreuth Festival in 1943 and 1951. In 1947 he performed the roles of Leporello, Guglielmo and Figaro at The Royal Opera, London. In 1948 he sang Guglielmo at the Edinburgh Festival.

He made guest appearances at the Paris Opéra, and sang at the Metropolitan Opera (Met) in New York (1952–54). He made his Met debut on November 26, 1952 as Leporello to Cesare Siepi's Don Giovanni with Fritz Reiner conducting. His other Met roles included Beckmesser, Faninal in Der Rosenkavalier, and Mozart's Figaro.

Considered a singer-actor with a superb sense of comedy, he also enjoyed success in operetta. Several recorded performances as Dr. Falke in Die Fledermaus are available.

He can be seen as Faninal in Paul Czinner's movie of Der Rosenkavalier with Elisabeth Schwarzkopf, conducted by Herbert von Karajan.

Kunz's final opera performances were at the Vienna State Opera in the mid 1970s.

== Later life and death ==
He lived in retirement in Vienna where he died on 8 September 1995.

== Bibliography ==
- Cornelia Szabó-Knotik, Herbert Prikopa: Erich Kunz. Ein Leben für die Oper. Löcker, Vienna 1994, ISBN 3-85409-239-3.
