= Tom Krause =

Finnish opera singer

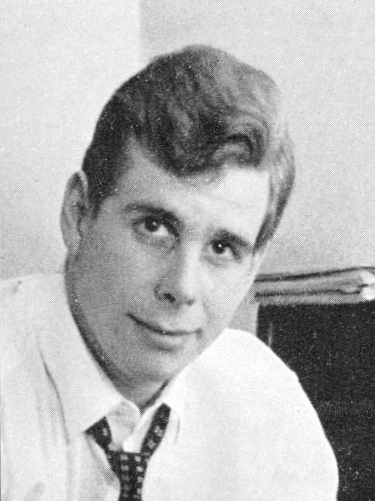
Tom Krause in c. 1965

Tom Gunnar Krause (5 July 1934 − 6 December 2013) was a Finnish operatic bass-baritone, particularly associated with Mozart roles.

== Early life ==
Born in Helsinki, Tom Krause studied medicine for three years with the intention of becoming a psychiatrist, while singing and playing the guitar in a jazz band, The Jamcats. His vocal talent led him to leave his medical studies for serious voice studies at the Vienna Music Academy. He studied with Margot Skoda, Sergio Nazor, Rudolf Bautz, and Vera Rózsa.

== Career ==
Krause made his operatic debut in Berlin, as Escamillo, in 1959, and quickly gained a reputation in opera and concert throughout Europe and the United States.

He was fluent in seven languages: English, German, French, Italian, Spanish, Swedish and Finnish. During a career spanning over 50 roles in the Italian, German, French, English, Finnish, Czech, Russian, and Swedish repertory including the Baroque, Classical, Romantic and Modern, Mr. Krause appeared in leading roles at most of the great opera houses of the world and regularly performed at the festivals of Bayreuth, Salzburg, Edinburgh, Glyndebourne, Savonlinna, and Tanglewood. A frequent guest soloist in concert, the baritone was heard regularly with the Philadelphia Orchestra, New York Philharmonic, Chicago Symphony, Cleveland Orchestra, Boston Symphony, Los Angeles Philharmonic, Montreal Symphony, Berlin Philharmonic, Vienna Philharmonic, Orchestre National de France, Amsterdam Concertgebouw, and others. Mr. Krause regularly shared the stage and recorded with singers as Plácido Domingo, Luciano Pavarotti, Jessye Norman, Kiri Te Kanawa, Joan Sutherland, Birgit Nilsson, Marilyn Horne, Margeret Price, Teresa Berganza, and Nicolai Gedda, and worked under the baton of Bernstein, Stravinsky, Solti, Von Karajan, Mehta, Ormandy, Shaw, Ozawa, Rostropovich, Eschenbach, Conlon, Salonen, Harnoncourt and Giulini, etc. He worked with stage directors such as Ponnelle, Strehler, Faggioni, Sellars, Dresen, Everding, Lieberman, Menotti, and Chereau.

He joined the Hamburg State Opera, where he sang mostly Mozart, Verdi, and Wagner roles, but also such rarities as Rossini's La pietra del paragone and Handel's Jephtha. He began making guest appearances in Munich, Amsterdam, and Brussels, and made his debut at the Bayreuth Festival, as the Herald in Lohengrin, in 1962.

In 1963, after having performed the Britten's War Requiem conducted by the composer, Tom Krause was chosen by Britten to sing the American premiere at the Tanglewood Summer Festival with the Boston Symphony. His English debut took place in 1963, at the Glyndebourne Festival as the Count in Capriccio. His 1967 debut, at the Metropolitan Opera as the Count in The Marriage of Figaro, received an ovation. From 1968 on, he appeared regularly at the Salzburg Festival, notably as Don Giovanni and Guglielmo. He took part in the premiere of Krenek's Der Goldene Bock in 1964, and of Searle's Hamlet, in 1968, both in Hamburg. In 1970, Krause was chosen by Eugene Ormandy for the American Premiere of the 13th Symphony by Shostakovich and in 1971, Samuel Barber composed his cantata The Lovers, for baritone solo and choir, with Krause in mind.

A renowned recital artist, he gave countless solo recitals throughout the U.S., Canada, Europe and Japan. He also appeared in numerous television and feature films. His works and recordings awarded him numerous distinctions and prizes during his 55-year career. In 1990, the Finnish State awarded Mr. Krause with the Order of the Finnish Lion – the highest award for cultural personalities in Finland. He was also given the title Kammersaenger in Hamburg for his achievements there. In recognition of his artistic contribution to his native Finland, Helsinki University awarded Mr. Krause the title of Doctor of Music Honoris Causa in 2003.

During the 1980s, Mr. Krause started giving master classes in the U.S. and Europe. From 1989 to 1990 he was guest professor at the Sibelius Academy in Helsinki, and from 1994 to 2001, a full professor at the Music Academy in Hamburg. In 2002, he added a full professorship at the Queen Sofia School of Music, Madrid, Spain, where he chaired the vocal department until his death in 2013. Because of his extensive experience in classical music and his interest in passing on his legacy of singing, Mr. Krause was in great demand for master classes around the world and was highly regarded as juror in the most important international singing competitions. He was frequently head of the Jury or Jury Member at the most prestigious International Singing competitions such as Mobil Song Quest, Auckland; the Queen Sonja International Singing Competition, Oslo; the Mirjam Helin International Singing Competition, Helsinki; Queen Elisabeth Singing Competition, Brussels; the ARD Competition, Munich; the Tschaikovsky Singing Competition, Moscow; International Competition of the Art of Lied, Stuttgart; the Singer of the World Competition, Cardiff; the Montreal International Singing Competition, Montreal, Canada; the Moniuszko Competition, Warsaw; etc. Mr. Krause regularly gave master classes at the Academy of Vocal Arts and the Curtis Institute of Music in Philadelphia, PA; CNIPAL, Marseille; Villecroze Academie Musicale, France; Chapelle Musicale Reine Elisabeth, Brussels; Mozarteum Summer Academy, Salzburg; Encuentro Musical, Santander; the Festival Music Academy, Savonlinna; Voksenåsen Summer Music Academy, Oslo; Kusatsu Music Festival, Kusatsu, Japan; etc. He has also given master classes at the San Francisco Opera, California; the Florida Grand Opera, Miami, Florida; Schleswig-Holstein Festival; the Fifth International Congress of Voice Teachers, Helsinki; Kunitachi School of Music, Tokyo; the Nagoya School of Music, Nagoya; Poland; Portugal, etc.

He was a National Patron of Delta Omicron, an international professional music fraternity. He died after a short illness in December 2013, aged 79.

== Discography ==
He can be heard in over 100 recordings. His recordings of Bach with Karl Münchinger and the Stuttgart Chamber Orchestra were awarded the Bach prize. His recording of Carmen with Marilyn Horne under Leonard Bernstein received a certificate for the best opera recording of 1973 by the National Academy of Recording Arts and Sciences. His recording of the complete Sibelius Songs received the Edison Prize, the Deutscher Schallplattenpreis and the Gramophone Classical Music Awards, among others.

== Sources ==
- Grove Music Online, J. B. Steane. Oxford University Press, 2008.
