= Georg Stern =

German opera singer

- Born: 1921
- Died: 1980; Frankfurt am Main, Germany
- Occupation: Operatic bass
- Years active: c. 1952–1980
- Known for: Salzburg Festival, La Scala, Cologne Opera

Georg Stern (1921 – 17 July 1980) was a German operatic bass.

== Life and career ==
Stern was born in Darmstadt. He began his artistic career in Frankfurt am Main. From 1946 to 1949 he was a member of the ensemble Staatstheater Darmstadt, then from 1949 to 1956 at Staatstheater Wiesbaden. From 1956 until his death he was a permanent member of the ensemble at Oper Frankfurt, only interrupted by a short stop at Cologne Opera. (1960–1962). In 1964 he appeared in Frankfurt in the premiere of Gerhard Wimberger's The Phantom Lady. In the 1965/1966 season he sang the "arrogantly-published gesticulating" advertisement editor at the Frankfurt Opera in the Frankfurt premiere of Shostakovich's The Nose.

Stern became famous especially for his embodiment of the bass roles in the music dramas of Richard Wagner: Daland in Der Fliegende Holländer, Biterolf in Tannhäuser, Veit Pogner in Die Meistersinger von Nürnberg, King Marke in Tristan und Isolde and Klingsor in Parsifal.

In 1952 he sang Klingsor at the Zurich Opera House. In 1956 he made a guest appearance at La Monnaie in Brussels as Figaro in Mozart's Le nozze di Figaro. Stern appeared several times at the Salzburg Festival: in 1957/1958 as Bartolo in Le nozze di Figaro, 1958 as Count Dominik in Arabella and in 1964/1965 as Truffaldin in Ariadne auf Naxos. As a member of the Cologne Opera ensemble he sang Leporello in Mozart's Don Giovanni. In 1960 he sang Klingsor at La Scala. Stern also gave a guest performance with this role at the Teatro San Carlo (1960, 1967), the Opera House in Rome (1963), the Teatro Comunale in Bologna (1963), the Deutsche Oper Berlin (1967) and at Teatro La Fenice in Venice (1970). In 1974 he sang the role of the Grand Inquisitor in Verdi's Don Carlos in The Hague.

Stern also appeared extensively as a concert singer (guest performance in Paris in 1972) and as a song interpreter. He was also seen on television (Vom Ersten das Beste, 1965). On 10 February 1968 he also appeared as a guest on the television show Einer wird gewinnen auf.

== Recordings ==
Stern's voice has been recorded on numerous audio documents. For Deutsche Grammophon he recorded Biterolf in a complete performance of Tannhäuser and Father Guardian in a section of Verdi's La forza del destino. The recently rediscovered live recording of the Cologne Don-Giovanni premiere was also reworked and restored by Deutsche Grammophon. In Frankfurt in 1956 he participated as Veit Pogner in a live recording of Wagner's Die Meistersinger von Nürnberg.

In the 1950s, several radio recordings of operas and operettas were made by Hessischer Rundfunk with Stern. In complete recordings, he sang among others Kezal in The Bartered Bride (1953) and Ollendorff in Der Bettelstudent (1952).

He also took see shanties such as Between Shanghai and St. Pauli, Once more to Bombay and When the accordion sounds on board. So he is also represented on the CD Rolling Home-Shanties & Seemannslieder with a musical contribution.

Stern died in Frankfurt am Main.
