= Charlotte Margiono =

Dutch operatic soprano (born 1955)

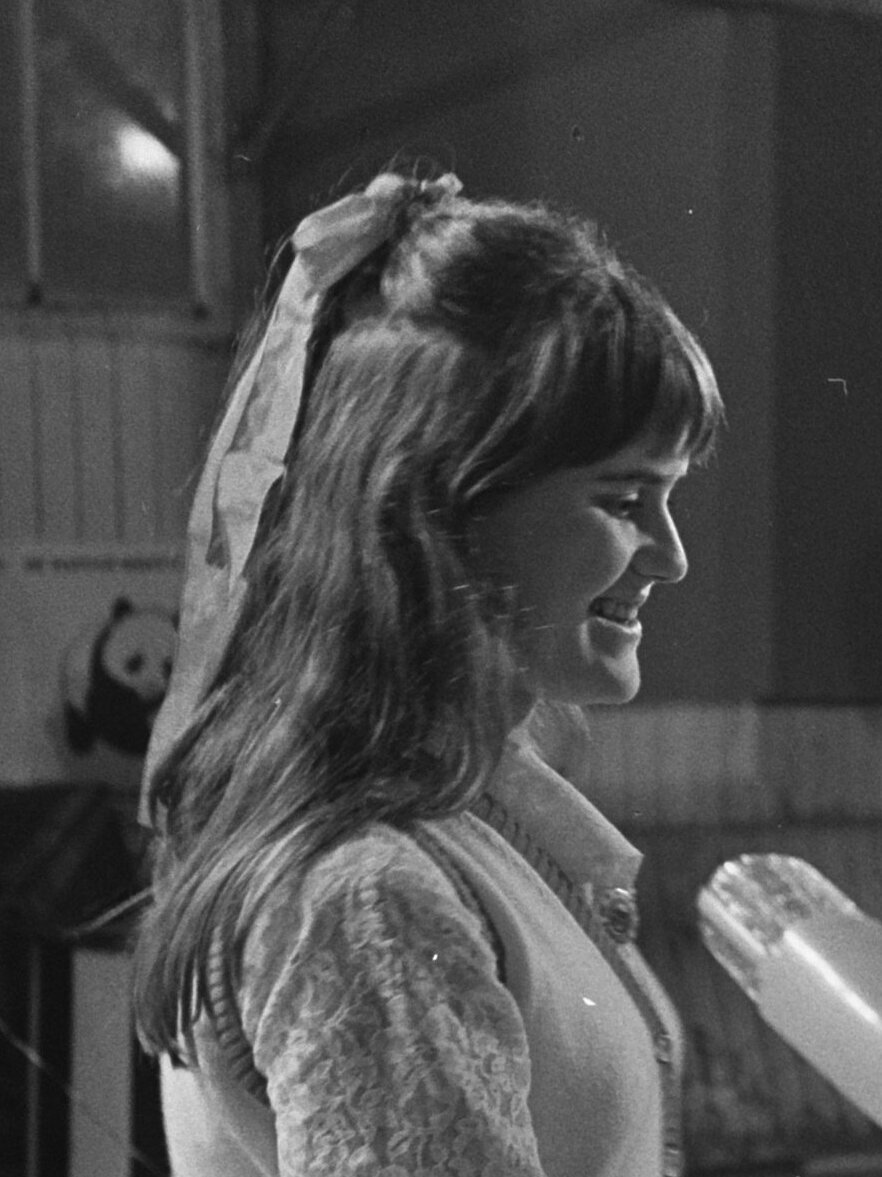
Charlotte Margiono (1968)

Charlotte Margiono (born March 24, 1955) is a Dutch operatic soprano.

== Life and career ==
Margiono (real name Charlotte Marie-Louise Heijdemann) was born in Amsterdam and studied at the Arnhem conservatoire with Aafje Heynis. She was originally a Mozart specialist, but gradually added a handful of later operas by Beethoven, Carl Maria von Weber, Verdi, Smetana, Puccini and Richard Strauss to her repertoire.

She has appeared in opera houses all over the world. After her international successes, she sang three lyric Wagner roles at the Netherlands Opera: Eva in Die Meistersinger von Nürnberg (2000), Elsa in Lohengrin (2002), and Sieglinde in Die Walküre (2004). She returned to Mozart for the controversial 2006-07 Netherlands Opera Da Ponte trilogy by Jossi Wieler and Sergio Morabito as Marcellina (Le nozze di Figaro), and Donna Elvira (Don Giovanni).

In 2008, she unexpectedly gave up opera, to better concentrate on Lieder, and on her concert work.

Margiono is famous for her interpretation of the Four Last Songs by Richard Strauss, which she recorded in 1993 with the Netherlands Radio Philharmonic Orchestra under Edo de Waart (Brilliant Classics).

Her beautiful voice is used intelligently, and with great artistry. She is a fine actress as well.

In 1998 she founded the Margiono Quintet, consisting of members of the Royal Concertgebouw Orchestra.

In December 2008 the Hogeschool voor de Kunsten Utrecht appointed Charlotte Margiono as a lecturer in "Communicating Music."
