= Irmgard Seefried =

German soprano (1919–1988)

External audio
- You may hear Irmgard Seefried singing in Wolfgang Amadeus Mozart's opera The Marriage of Figaro K. 492 with the RIAS Symphony Orchestra conducted by Ferenc Fricsay in 1961 Here on archive.org

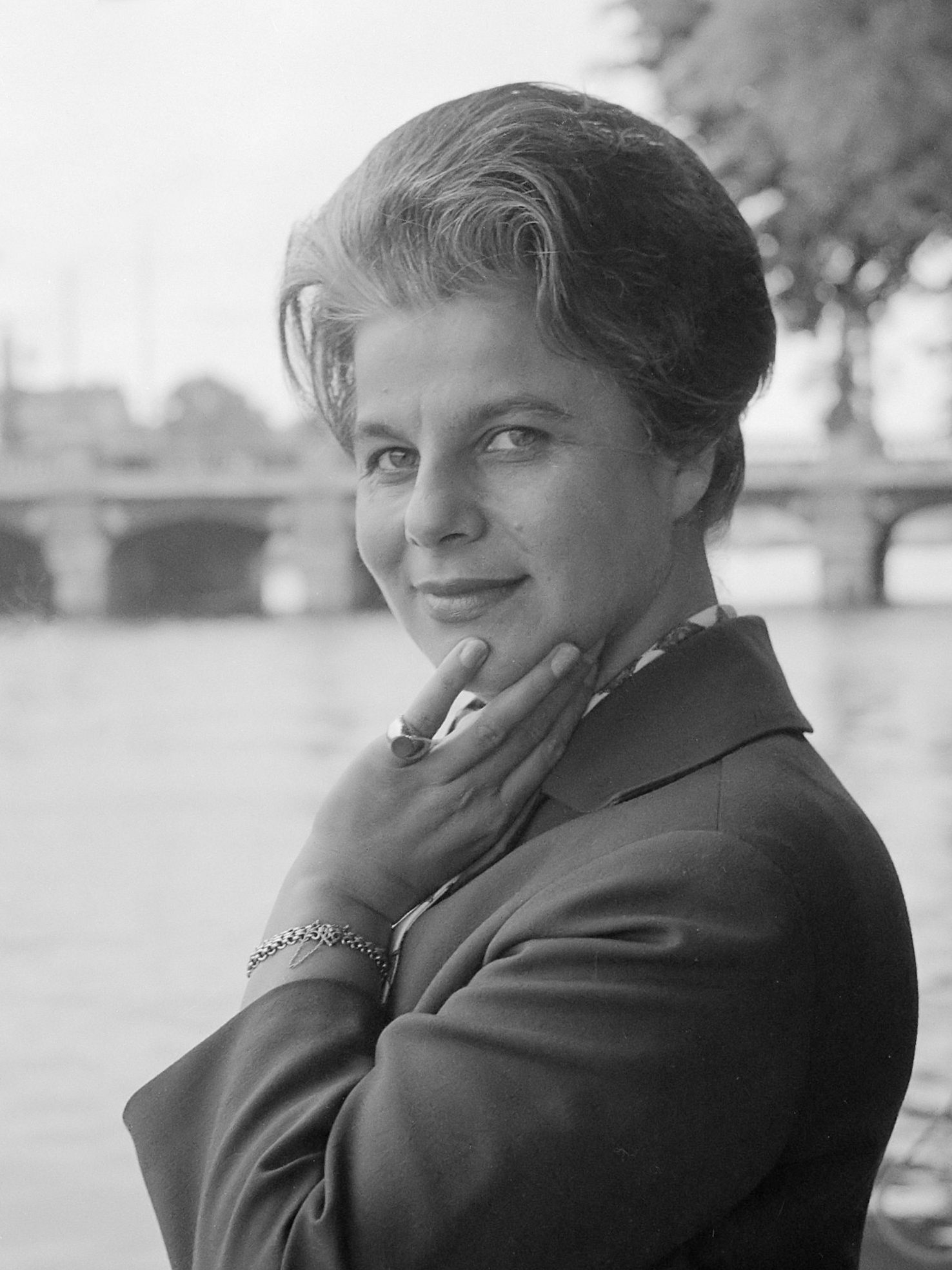
Irmgard Seefried (1962)

Irmgard Seefried (9 October 1919 – 24 November 1988) was a distinguished German soprano who sang opera, sacred music, and lieder.

Maria Theresia Irmgard Seefried was born on 9 October 1919 in Köngetried, near Mindelheim, Bavaria, Germany, the daughter of educated Austrian-born parents. Her father taught high school, and he began to give her piano lessons and vocal lessons when she was five years old. She studied at Augsburg University before making her debut in Aachen as the priestess in Verdi's Aida in 1940.

She began to sing leading parts in 1942 (Agathe in Weber's Der Freischütz in 1942, and the next year she made her debut at Vienna State Opera with Eva in Wagner's Die Meistersinger von Nürnberg conducted by Karl Böhm). From then on, she remained with the State Opera until her retirement in 1976.

She sang at the Salzburg Festival every year from 1946 to 1964 (except 1955, 1961 and 1962) in operas (Susanna in The Marriage of Figaro, Fiordiligi in Così fan tutte, Zerlina in Don Giovanni, Pamina in The Magic Flute, Marzelline in Fidelio and the Composer in Ariadne auf Naxos), concerts and recitals.

She appeared at the Royal Opera House, Covent Garden in London from 1947 to 1949, and also La Scala in Milan, the Edinburgh Festival, etc. She made her Metropolitan Opera in New York City debut in November 1953 as Susanna in Mozart's Nozze di Figaro and appeared there for only one season (1953–54), in five performances, all as Susanna.

One of the outstanding singers to emerge immediately after the Second World War, she was noted for her Mozart and Richard Strauss roles. But she also sang in other composers' operas; the title role in Puccini's Madama Butterfly, Marie in Alban Berg's Wozzeck, Eva in Meistersinger, Blanche in Poulenc's Dialogues des Carmélites, and the title role in Janáček's Káťa Kabanová. She was also a noted lieder singer, and a number of her Salzburg Festival recitals were recorded. She left many recordings of oratorio and sacred music by Bach, Mozart, Haydn (including at least four different renditions of the Archangel Gabriel in Die Schöpfung), Brahms, Fauré, Beethoven, Dvořák, Verdi and Stravinsky.

Although she was a high soprano, she performed, and recorded, both the trouser roles of the Composer and Octavian in Richard Strauss's Ariadne auf Naxos and Der Rosenkavalier, respectively. These roles are usually associated with weightier voices, and today are usually sung by mezzo-sopranos.

She often sang with Elisabeth Schwarzkopf, who said in interview that Seefried was naturally able to achieve results effortlessly which other singers, including Schwarzkopf herself, had to work hard to produce.

She can be seen singing Mahler on a DVD from EMI, with Schwarzkopf and Dietrich Fischer-Dieskau.

She was married to Austrian violinist Wolfgang Schneiderhan, one of the concertmasters of the Vienna Philharmonic, from 1948 until her death. They had three daughters, one of whom is actress Mona Seefried (born 1957).

After retirement, she taught students at the Vienna Academy of Music (Wiener Singakademie) and Salzburg Mozarteum. She died on 24 November 1988 in Vienna, aged 69.

== Bibliography ==
- The Last Prima Donnas, by Lanfranco Rasponi, Knopf, 1982. ISBN 0-394-52153-6
- Discography (Capon's Lists of Opera Recordings)
- Celebrated musicians' concert tours of Southern Africa 1953–1978: Irmgard Seefried, Austrian Soprano. Irmgard Seefried 1968, on first of two acclaimed tours of southern Africa
