= Angela Brower =

American operatic mezzo-soprano

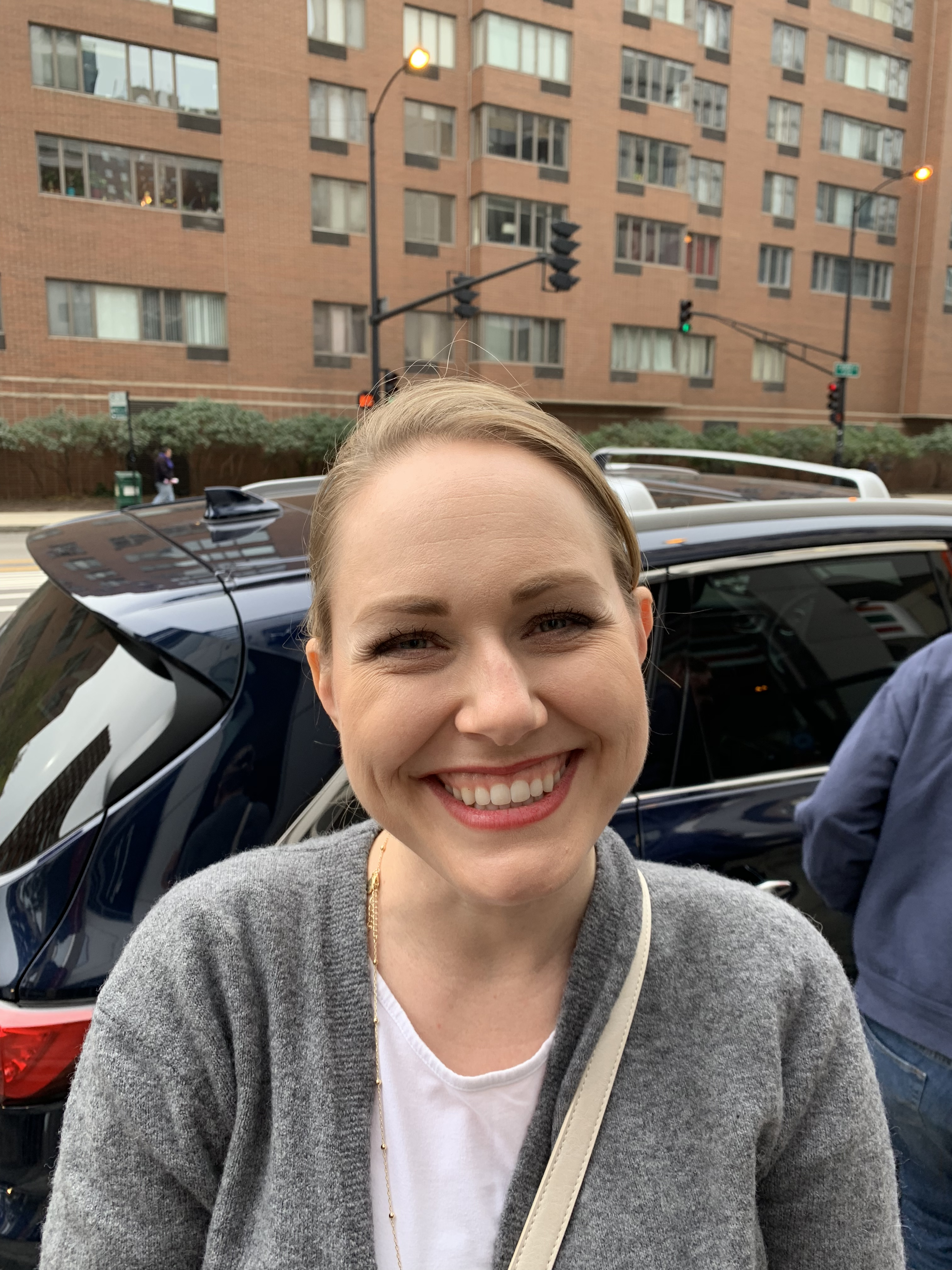
Brower in 2018

Angela Brower is an American mezzo-soprano opera singer from Arizona. She is known for performing trouser roles, such as the title role of Octavian in Der Rosenkavalier by Richard Strauss in the opera's Colombia premiere.

== Early life and education ==
Brower was born and raised in Arizona with five brothers. She is a 2006 Bachelor of Music in vocal performance graduate of the School of Music in Arizona State University's Herberger Institute for Design and the Arts. She also studied at Indiana University Jacobs School of Music.

== Music career ==
Brower began her career at the Glimmerglass Opera Young American Artists Programme in 2008. Although she passed up on the formal auditions for the Bavarian State Opera during her summer at Glimmerglass, her audition was requested by Florian Scholz (director of Stadttheater Klagenfurt). Brower joined the Bavarian State Opera in Munich in 2009 in its Opera Studio and then from 2010 through 2016 in its ensemble. In 2009, she earned the Munich Opera Festival Prize for her portrayal of Dorabella in Mozart's Così fan tutte. In her performance as Cherubino in his Le nozze di Figaro, she was part of a cast conducted by Yannick Nézet-Séguin that resulted in a 2017 Grammy Awards nomination in the Best Opera Recording category. Brower made her South American and Latin American debut on September 1, 2018, at the Teatro Mayor in the title role of Octavian in the Colombia premiere of Der Rosenkavalier by Richard Strauss. She had previously played Octavian several times, including a Carnegie Hall performance, and considers it her signature role. She is known for trouser roles.
