= Lisa Otto =

German operatic soprano

Lisa Otto (14 November 1919 – 18 September 2013) was a German operatic soprano, particularly associated with soubrette and light coloratura soprano roles.

Born in Dresden, she studied there at the Musikhochschule with Susanne Steinmetz-Prée. She made her debut, as Sophie in Der Rosenkavalier, in 1941 at the Silesian Opera in Beuthen, where she remained until 1944. She then sang in Nuremberg (1944–45), Dresden (1945–51), and joined the Berlin State Opera in 1951, where she was to remain until 1985.

She is best known for soubrette roles in Mozart's operas, such as Blondchen, Susanna, Zerlina, Despina, and Papagena. Other notables roles included the First Lady, Marzelline, Ännchen, Zerline, Echo, etc. She took part in the creation of Giselher Klebe's Alkmene and Hans Werner Henze's Der junge Lord. She made guest appearances at the Vienna State Opera, the Salzburg Festival, La Scala in Milan, the Paris Opera, and the Glyndebourne Festival Opera.

== Personal life and death ==
Otto was married to Dr Albert Bind. She died in Berlin on 18 September 2013, at the age of 93.

== Sources ==
- Operissimo.com
