= Luca Pisaroni =

Italian operatic bass-baritone (born June 8th,1975)

Luca Pisaroni (born 1975) is an Italian operatic bass-baritone, known for his roles in Mozart's operas, but who has steadily expanded his repertoire into the Baroque as well as moving beyond into Rossini.

== Early life ==
Although born in Ciudad Bolívar, Venezuela, Pisaroni's family moved to Busseto in Italy – the home of Giuseppe Verdi — when he was four years old. There, his father owned a car-repair firm and his mother was a teacher; it was in that town where he noted "you feel Verdi's spirit all over the place!" and where his love of opera began.

== Musical studies and training ==
In Busseto, he states that "as a kid, I used to go to the opera with my grandfather, and when I was 11, I already knew I wanted to be an opera singer." While not actually attending the musical academy run by the famous local tenor Carlo Bergonzi—he listened-in to his master classes after school— Pisaroni was influenced by the tenor:

I did not technically train with Bergonzi, because I was too young. I sang for him when I was 13 or 14 and he told me to wait until my voice would change and I would be able to start singing. While I did not technically work with him, I listened to his teaching almost every afternoon, and this really taught me a lot in terms of diction, phrasing and how to use your voice to communicate to an audience. I consider him one of my teachers because of that. The way he sang, phrased and used his instrument was unbelievable. His approach on singing was unique and made him one of the best Verdi tenors.

He began his training at the Conservatorio Giuseppe Verdi in Milan, where he was not comfortable, and so continued his studies for a year in Buenos Aires with Renato Sassola and Rozita Zozulya, and also in New York.

== Singing career ==
After his musical training in Milan, Buenos Aires and New York, Pisaroni's professional operatic debut was in the title role of Mozart's Le Nozze di Figaro in Klagenfurt, in 2001. That same year, he was awarded the Eberhard-Wächter-Medal as "Newcomer of the Season" by the Vienna State Opera. Pisaroni sang Masetto at the 2002 Salzburg Festival in Mozart's Don Giovanni. These early appearances led to engagements throughout the world in the major Mozart operas.

Pisaroni has since appeared in major opera houses and festivals across Europe and America. In 2002, he debuted at the Salzburg Whitsun Festival with Haydn's Nelson Mass, and at the Salzburg Festival as Masetto in Don Giovanni, where he has performed every summer since.

=== Opera ===
Apart from the aforementioned roles, Pisaroni also has an extensive list of onstage performances to his credit. These include many Mozart roles such as Publio (from La Clemenza di Tito) for the Salzburg Festival at the Aix-en-Provence Festival, as well as at the Metropolitan Opera. Leporello (from Don Giovanni) at the Teatro Real in Madrid and the Opéra Bastille followed, then Figaro again at The Santa Fe Opera as well as at the Met. At the Théâtre des Champs-Elysées he performed once more as Papageno in Die Zauberflöte. Guglielmo (from Così fan tutte) for the Netherlands Opera, the Glyndebourne Festival Opera, and the Salzburg Mozart Week were additions to his Mozart portrayals.

Pisaroni appeared as Alidoro in La Cenerentola in Santiago, Chile, and, in 2012, as the title character in Maometto II at The Santa Fe Opera, which presented the world premiere of the new critical edition prepared by Philip Gossett from the 1820 edition.

His Puccini roles have included Colline in La bohème.

Pisaroni's appearances in Handel roles such as Tiridate in Radamisto at the Houston Opera, in addition to Achilla in Giulio Cesare for Opera Colorado and Melisso from Alcina, have been distinguished, but regarding his attitude to singing more Baroque opera and, specifically, in response to a question as to whether he might do some Cavalli or some Vivaldi in addition, he stated:

To be honest with you, I find the Baroque very interesting both dramatically and vocally, but it is something that you need to let go after a while, if you want to develop your voice to do a certain "heavier" repertoire. Many Baroque singers only sing Baroque and this is not what I want to do. I enjoyed doing Baroque; [in addition to the roles named above] I did Rinaldo, Cavalli's Ercole Amante, and I did Ariodante but there is a moment when you say "if I want my voice to develop I need to explore other repertoire".

In a different vein, he sang Caliban in the baroque pasticcio The Enchanted Island at the Met in 2011 and he returned there in April/May 2014 for performances in La Cenerentola. He returned to the Met in 2015 as Leporello in the company's production of Don Giovanni.

=== Concerts ===
In concert performances, Pisaroni has sung Zebul in Händel's Jephtha with the Berlin Philharmonic, conducted by Nikolaus Harnoncourt.

He has also performed Michael Haydn's Requiem in C minor under Ivor Bolton, and Mozart's Mass in C Minor under Marc Minkowski, both at the Salzburg Festival.

Furthermore, Pisaroni also has Niccolò Piccinni's Iphigénie en Tauride with the Orchestre National de France, Mozart's Coronation Mass at the Théâtre des Champs-Elysées, and Vivaldi's Orlando Furioso in Toulouse and Brussels under his belt, the last two with Jean-Christophe Spinosi.

He has a keen interest in lieder, and has linked his living in Vienna with his love of Schubert. Among other composers represented in his song recitals are Beethoven, Reichardt, Brahms and Liszt.

== Personal life ==
It was through his 2002 appearance in Salzburg that Pisaroni met both the American baritone Thomas Hampson (who was singing the Don) and his daughter Cate. Cate and Pisaroni were subsequently married and made their home in Vienna..

== Discography ==
- Cavalli – Ercole Amante – Bolton, Netherlands Opera, Amsterdam (DVD)
- Haydn – Requiem – Bolton
- Handel – La Resurrezione – Haim
- Handel – Rinaldo (DVD)
- Martin y Soler – Il burbero di buon cuore – Rousset (DVD)
- Mozart – Cosi fan tutte – Fischer – Glyndebourne (DVD)
- Mozart – Cosi Fan Tutte – Metzmacher, Netherlands Opera (DVD)
- Mozart – Don Giovanni – Harding – Salzburg (DVD) (Masetto)
- Mozart – Don Giovanni – Jurowski – Glyndebourne (DVD) (Leporello)
- Mozart – Le nozze di Fígaro – Jacobs – París (DVD)
- Mozart – Le nozze di Fígaro – Metzmacher – Amsterdam (DVD)
- Mozart – La clemenza di Tito – Harnoncourt – Salzburg (DVD)
- Mozart – Mass in c minor – Langrée
- Rossini – La cenerentola – Zedda
